= List of Black Mirror episodes =

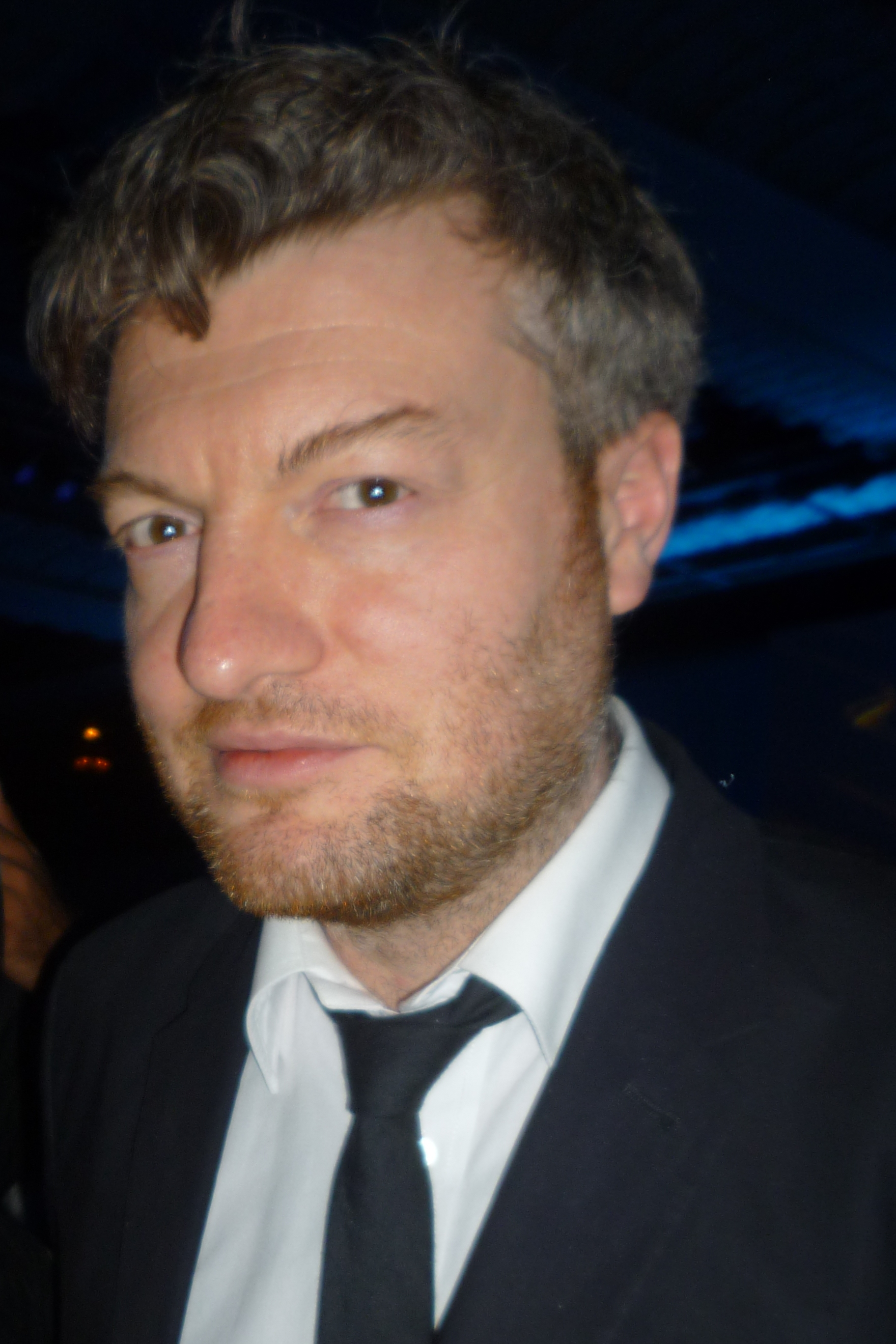
Charlie Brooker, creator of Black Mirror

Black Mirror is a British science fiction anthology series created by Charlie Brooker. The programme was inspired by The Twilight Zone and explores technology and its side-effects. It began on the British television network Channel 4 before moving to the American streaming platform Netflix and has run for seven series between 2011 and 2025. There are 33 episodes and one interactive film, Black Mirror: Bandersnatch. Episodes vary in length between 40 and 89 minutes and can be watched in any order. Actors rarely appear in more than one episode, though many installments make small references known as "Easter eggs" to previous episodes, such as through in-universe news channels and briefly-seen text. In 2025, the episode "USS Callister" received a sequel episode titled "USS Callister : Into Infinity", marking it as the first Black Mirror story to receive a continuation.

The first two series comprised three episodes each and ran on Channel 4 in December 2011 and February 2013. After discussions for a third series fell through, a special entitled "White Christmas" was commissioned and aired in December 2014. The following year, Netflix commissioned twelve episodes, later splitting this into two series of six episodes that were released on 21 October 2016 and 29 December 2017. The interactive film Bandersnatch was spun out from the fifth series due to its complexity, debuting on 28 December 2018, and the delayed fifth series of three episodes premiered on 5 June 2019. The sixth series was released on 15 June 2023 and consists of five episodes. A seventh series was announced in November 2023, and was released on 10 April 2025.

Episodes are usually dystopian, often with unhappy endings, and many are set in a futuristic world with advanced technology. The instalments have spanned a variety of genres including drama, psychological horror, political satire, and romantic comedy. Black Mirror has been met with positive reception from critics (Note: On Rotten Tomatoes, series 1 received a 98% rating, series 2 received an 87% rating and "White Christmas" received an 89% rating. Series 3 holds an 86% rating on Rotten Tomatoes and a score of 82 on Metacritic; series 4 holds an 86% rating on Rotten Tomatoes and a score of 72 on Metacritic. Bandersnatch holds a 74% rating on Rotten Tomatoes and a score of 61 on Metacritic. Series 5 holds a rating of 68% on Rotten Tomatoes and a score of 66 on Metacritic, while series 6 holds a rating of 78% on Rotten Tomatoes and a score of 68 on Metacritic.) and has received numerous awards and nominations, including three consecutive wins of the Primetime Emmy Award for Outstanding Television Movie. (Note: "San Junipero" won in 2017, "USS Callister" won in 2018, and Black Mirror: Bandersnatch won in 2019.)

== Series overview ==
Series	Episodes	Originally released		
Series	Episodes	First released	Last released	Network
1	3	4 December 2011	18 December 2011	Channel 4
2	3	11 February 2013	25 February 2013	Channel 4
Special		16 December 2014		Channel 4
3	6	21 October 2016		Netflix
4	6	29 December 2017		Netflix
Interactive film		28 December 2018		Netflix
5	3	5 June 2019		Netflix
6	5	15 June 2023		Netflix
7	6	10 April 2025		Netflix

== Episodes ==
=== Series 1 (2011) ===
No. overall	No. in series	Title	Directed by	Written by	Original release date	UK viewers (millions)
1	1	"The National Anthem"	Otto Bathurst	Charlie Brooker	4 December 2011	2.07
Princess Susannah, a British royal family member, is kidnapped. For her return, the kidnapper demands that the prime minister, Michael Callow, have sex with a pig on live television. The demands gather attention on social media and then national news. Backup plans to fabricate footage of the act are trialled by Callow's staff without his knowledge and lead to a change in public opinion when the kidnapper discovers and reveals the plan. A failed raid on a suspected location leads to the injury of a journalist, Malaika, who has been communicating with government staff. Callow reluctantly agrees to go forward with the broadcast to an audience of over a billion. However, the kidnapper—a famous artist—had released Susannah shortly before the broadcast and then hanged himself, facts which are kept from the public and Callow. A year later, Callow maintains good approval ratings but his relationship with his wife is damaged. Cast: Rory Kinnear and Lindsay Duncan
2	2	"Fifteen Million Merits"	Euros Lyn	Charlie Brooker & Kanak Huq	11 December 2011	1.52
Bing lives in a society where the majority of people ride stationary bikes, to generate power for the minority who don't. They are compensated with "merits" - a currency used to buy essentials and virtual entertainment. His bedroom is covered from floor to ceiling in screens and he watches another one as he rides the bike. One day, he hears Abi singing in the bathroom and convinces her to enter the talent show Hot Shot, paying almost his entire savings for her ticket. She sings "Anyone Who Knows What Love Is (Will Understand)" by Irma Thomas but the judges say they cannot hire another singer and she is instead coerced into becoming a pornographic performer. Later, Bing is unable to pay the merits to skip a pornographic advertisement starring Abi and is tormented by the images. He lives frugally until he can afford another ticket, for himself, and threatens to commit suicide when onstage. The judges give him a regular show in which he rails against the system he lives in, while becoming a part of it. Cast: Daniel Kaluuya, Jessica Brown Findlay, and Rupert Everett
3	3	"The Entire History of You"	Brian Welsh	Jesse Armstrong	18 December 2011	N/A (<1.53) (Note: Not reported in the weekly top 30 programmes for four-screen viewer ratings.)
With the implantation of a device called a "grain" behind their ear, people can replay their memories through their eyes or on a screen. At a dinner party, Liam is suspicious of his wife Ffion's behaviour towards her friend Jonas. Upon returning home, Ffion reveals a former relationship with Jonas, though some of her details are inconsistent. Liam drinks alcohol continually throughout the night and then heads to Jonas' house. On threat of glassing, Liam forces Jonas to delete every stored memory he has of Ffion. Liam crashes his car and when he regains consciousness, he replays his memories and notices one of Jonas's memories was of Ffion in bed. Liam confronts Ffion, who continues to lie, and forces her to show her memory of having sex with Jonas around the time her baby was conceived. Later, alone in the house, Liam uses a razor to try to remove his grain. Cast: Toby Kebbell and Jodie Whittaker

=== Series 2 (2013) ===
No. overall	No. in series	Title	Directed by	Written by	Original release date	UK viewers (millions)
4	1	"Be Right Back"	Owen Harris	Charlie Brooker	11 February 2013	2.01
After moving into a countryside home, Martha's boyfriend Ash is killed while returning a rental van. Discovering she is pregnant, Martha tries a service her friend enrolled her in that uses Ash's social media posts and online communications to create an artificial intelligence imitation of him. She interacts with the AI through instant messaging and video calls, conversing with it during walks and ignoring her sister's attempts to reach out. The next stage provides a physical android version of Ash, which unsettles Martha. During an argument, she takes the android to a cliff and orders it to jump, but is frustrated when it starts to obey such an order. Several years later, on her daughter's birthday, her daughter brings a slice of cake to the android Ash, which is stored in the attic and only allowed to be visited on weekends. Cast: Hayley Atwell and Domhnall Gleeson
5	2	"White Bear"	Carl Tibbetts	Charlie Brooker	18 February 2013	1.69
A woman wakes in a house with amnesia and finds that passersby silently record her with their phones. After being chased by a masked man, she meets Jem, who is also hiding from "hunters". Jem explains that the recording onlookers have been brainwashed by a strange signal, while the hunters remain unaffected and violent. The woman joins Jem in her plan to destroy the signal transmitter. In a forest, a hunter named Baxter holds them at gunpoint but is subdued by Jem. They reach the facility, where hunters attack. The woman wrestles a shotgun away but it shoots only confetti, revealing the entire day to have been a staged performance, with everyone except the woman, named Victoria Skillane, acting as either performers or audience members. Victoria had been an accomplice to the child murderer Iain Rannoch. She was sentenced to 100 years in White Bear Justice Park, where her memory is wiped daily so her punishment—reenacted as public entertainment—can repeat indefinitely. Cast: Lenora Crichlow and Michael Smiley
6	3	"The Waldo Moment"	Bryn Higgins	Charlie Brooker	25 February 2013	1.28
Jamie Salter controls a computer-animated bear named Waldo on a satirical show. Waldo pranks politicians by asking vulgar questions in interviews. After interviewing the Conservative Liam Monroe, Waldo is entered for a by-election in a Conservative safe seat where Monroe is standing. Jamie meets the Labour candidate Gwendolyn Harris and they have sex, but Harris is made to avoid further contact during the campaign. At a student-organised hustings, Waldo derides both Monroe and Harris. The event goes viral and Jamie meets with an American agent interested in using Waldo's image. After Harris rejects Jamie's apology, Jamie publicly reveals himself as the man behind Waldo and urges people not to vote for him. His executive Jack takes over Waldo and encourages the public to attack Jamie. In a hospital, he sees that Monroe won and Waldo came second. Later, a homeless Jamie is tasered by the secret police for throwing a bottle at a screen that displays Waldo, the face of the New World Order, on every channel. Cast: Daniel Rigby, Chloe Pirrie, Tobias Menzies and Jason Flemyng

=== Special (2014) ===
No. overall	Title	Directed by	Written by	Original release date	UK viewers (millions)
7	"White Christmas"	Carl Tibbetts	Charlie Brooker	16 December 2014	1.66
In a cabin, Matt and Joe talk about their past. Matt used to run an online group on the dark web who watched each other seduce women through "Z-Eyes" (mandatory implants that have replaced phones) that record vision and hearing. It ended after a mentally ill woman poisoned one of the attendees in a murder–suicide. Matt's former profession was training "cookies"—digital clones of people stored in an egg-shaped object—as personal assistants. Meanwhile, Joe's wife Beth "blocked" him with the Z-Eyes, so that he could not communicate with her after an argument over her planned abortion. Joe travelled to Beth's father's house each Christmas to spy on Beth and the child—whom she kept, but whom Joe also cannot see. After Beth's death, he was able to see the child, but he was not the father. Joe confronted Beth's father and killed him, leaving the daughter to freeze to death. Matt reveals that they are both in a cookie, and Joe has just confessed to his crimes. Joe will be imprisoned, while Matt is registered as a sex offender and blocked by everybody for life. Meanwhile, as punishment, a law enforcement officer sets the time inside Joe's cookie to run at 1,000 years per minute on an infinite loop. Cast: Jon Hamm, Rafe Spall, Oona Chaplin, and Natalia Tena

=== Series 3 (2016) ===
No. overall	No. in series	Title	Directed by	Written by	Original release date
8	1	"Nosedive"	Joe Wright	Story by : Charlie Brooker; Teleplay by : Rashida Jones & Mike Schur	21 October 2016
In a world where every social interaction is rated on a five-star scale through eye implants and mobile devices, a person's overall score dictates their socioeconomic standing. Lacie, rated 4.2, is keen to reach 4.5 to qualify for a better apartment. She eagerly accepts an invitation to be the maid of honour at her childhood friend Naomi's wedding. However, her flight there is canceled and her score is too low to book a replacement. After an argument with airport staff, she is penalized with “double damage", in which negative ratings have greater effect. With her new rating only affording a rundown car that breaks down, Lacie hitchhikes with a low-rated truck driver, Susan. Naomi uninvites Lacie due to her lower rating, but Lacie gatecrashes the wedding anyway and attempts to deliver her speech. Increasingly agitated, Lacie grabs a knife as guests give her low ratings, prompting security to arrest and imprison her. Now classified as "unratable" and stripped of her citizenship, Lacie and a fellow inmate revel in their newfound freedom from the rating system through unfiltered insults. Cast: Bryce Dallas Howard, Alice Eve, Cherry Jones, and James Norton
9	2	"Playtest"	Dan Trachtenberg	Charlie Brooker	21 October 2016
After Cooper's father dies, Cooper travels the world and avoids his mother's calls. He spends a night with Sonja in London and, after being victim to identity theft, finds a paid offer to playtest an experimental game. He tests an augmented reality version of Whac-A-Mole and meets Shou, the company's owner. In a mansion, Cooper tests a horror game where an artificial neural network learns from his fears. After fighting with a simulated Sonja, Katie tells Cooper that the technology should not cause him physical pain and leads him to a room where the test can be terminated. In the room, Cooper loses his memories and Katie and Shou say that the technology has advanced too far to be removed. Cooper then awakens in Shou's office, all subsequent events having been simulated. He returns home to find his mother unable to recognise him. However, Cooper's entire experience—from Whac-a-Mole onwards—was contained in the 0.04 second-long experiment. He died during the experiment when a phone call from his mother caused electrical interference. Cast: Wyatt Russell, Hannah John-Kamen, Wunmi Mosaku, and Ken Yamamura
10	3	"Shut Up and Dance"	James Watkins	Charlie Brooker & William Bridges	21 October 2016
A hacker records Kenny masturbating via his webcam and threatens to release it unless he follows their instructions. Kenny picks up a cake from another blackmailed individual and takes it to a hotel room where Hector was waiting to commit adultery with a sex worker. The hackers contact Hector, who complies with their commands to avoid losing custody of his children. Kenny and Hector drive to a bank and Kenny robs it at gunpoint. Hector drives Kenny to the woods to drop off the money and leaves to dispose of the car (to get rid of any evidence linking him and Kenny to the robbery). Another blackmailed person explains to Kenny that they must fight to the death over the money while filmed by a drone. Kenny tries to shoot himself, but the gun is empty. Later, staggering out of the woods, Kenny discovers that the hackers have released the footage. His distraught mother calls, having learned that he was masturbating to child pornography as armed police swarm the area. Cast: Alex Lawther and Jerome Flynn
11	4	"San Junipero"	Owen Harris	Charlie Brooker	21 October 2016
In 1987, the shy Yorkie meets the outgoing Kelly in a beach resort town named San Junipero. The next week, the pair meet again and have sex. Yorkie struggles to find Kelly afterwards, until a man suggests looking in a different time. She searches in multiple decades until finding Kelly in 2002, where Kelly confesses that she is dying, and wanted to avoid developing feelings for Yorkie. They have sex again. San Junipero is revealed as a simulated reality inhabited by the deceased and elderly, who interact through their younger bodies. In California, Kelly meets a paralysed Yorkie, soon to be euthanised so that she can live in San Junipero permanently. Kelly marries Yorkie to authorise the euthanasia. However, the pair argue when Kelly says she does not wish to stay in San Junipero when she dies: her husband, with whom she was together for 49 years, did not choose to join after their daughter died without the option to do so. After some time, Kelly changes her mind and happily reunites with Yorkie after her own euthanasia. Cast: Gugu Mbatha-Raw and Mackenzie Davis
12	5	"Men Against Fire"	Jakob Verbruggen	Charlie Brooker	21 October 2016
Soldiers are exterminating mutated humans called "roaches" in a foreign country with the help of MASS, an augmented reality implant which gives them data. Stripe encounters his first group of roaches and kills two of them, but one uses a strange device that interferes with his MASS interface. The next day, Stripe tries to save a frightened woman and her child when Hunter inexplicably tries to kill them. The mother explains to Stripe that MASS causes soldiers to see them as mutants, but they are normal and healthy. "Roaches" are an ethnic group against whom the military is committing genocide. Hunter kills the mother and child and knocks Stripe unconscious. In a cell, a psychologist, Arquette, gives Stripe the choice of indefinite imprisonment or a memory wipe. Later, Stripe is a decorated officer and approaches a beautiful house and partner he pictured in his dreams, but the scene is a figment of his MASS. Cast: Malachi Kirby, Madeline Brewer, Ariane Labed, Sarah Snook, and Michael Kelly
13	6	"Hated in the Nation"	James Hawes	Charlie Brooker	21 October 2016
To counteract near-extinction of bees, British environmental robotics company Granular has developed robotic bees called "Autonomous Drone Insects" (ADIs). DCI Karin Parke and Detective Blue Coulson, with the help of the National Crime Agency agent Shaun Li, discover that rogue ADIs caused the deaths of two people, both subjects of the "#DeathTo" hashtag after gathering recent hate on social media. The hashtag was spread by a person who is running a "Game of Consequences" where the person most-mentioned alongside the hashtag is killed each day. They try to save the new target, but ADIs swarm the safe house and kill her. The public and news media become aware of the game as Blue traces the hashtag to a former Granular employee Garrett Scholes. A hacking toolkit of Scholes' is found, which Li insists on using to deactivate the ADI system. However, as part of Scholes's plan, the deactivation code triggers the ADIs to execute some 400,000 people–everyone that participated in the game. Karin and Shaun appear in court to testify over the incident, while Blue–PKIA has tracked Scholes down abroad. Cast: Kelly Macdonald, Faye Marsay, and Benedict Wong

=== Series 4 (2017) ===
No. overall	No. in series	Title	Directed by	Written by	Original release date
14	1	"USS Callister"	Toby Haynes	William Bridges & Charlie Brooker	29 December 2017
Callister Inc. develops the multiplayer game Infinity, led by CEO James Walton and CTO Robert Daly, the game's designer who receives little recognition. Daly has secretly created a private server within the game modeled after his favorite series, in which the crew of the starship USS Callister are sentient digital clones of his coworkers, including Walton. After Daly adds a new programmer, Nanette Cole, to the server, she is distressed and confused, and resists his commands until he inflicts pain to demonstrate his control. During Daly's absence, Nanette plans an escape, though Walton is initially reluctant after remembering that Daly once uploaded a clone of his son and killed him in-game. Nanette manages to blackmail her real-life self into distracting Daly long enough for the crew to steal his in-game "omnicorder", which controls the server. Daly returns and chases them, but they escape, causing the server to collapse with Daly trapped inside and killing his real-life self. The crew transfers into Infinity's public servers as players. Cast: Jesse Plemons, Cristin Milioti, Jimmi Simpson, Michaela Coel, and Billy Magnussen
15	2	"Arkangel"	Jodie Foster	Charlie Brooker	29 December 2017
Marie briefly loses her three-year-old daughter Sara and decides to have her implanted with the Arkangel system, whereby Marie can track Sara's vision, hearing and health via a tablet computer. A filter censors Sara from seeing or hearing stressful situations. After nine-year-old Sara makes herself bleed, Marie deactivates the filter and puts the tablet in the attic. One night when Sara is fifteen, Marie discovers she is lying about her whereabouts and, in distress, retrieves the tablet. Marie sees Sara having sex for the first time with Trick. Marie begins using the tablet in secret; she forces Trick to avoid Sara after he gives her cocaine, and sneaks an emergency contraception pill into Sara's smoothie. Sara discovers Marie is using the tablet and beats her with it, causing the stress filter to be reactivated so that she cannot see the damage she is doing. When Marie regains consciousness, Sara is gone. Cast: Rosemarie DeWitt, Brenna Harding, and Owen Teague
16	3	"Crocodile"	John Hillcoat	Charlie Brooker	29 December 2017
While driving under the influence on a mountain road, Rob fatally collides with a cyclist. He and his friend Mia throw the body into a nearby lake. Fifteen years later, Rob, who has quit drinking, visits Mia to discuss sending an anonymous letter to the victim's wife. Afraid the letter would be traced, Mia kills Rob and disposes of his body. The following day, insurance investigator Shazia investigates an unrelated traffic accident. Using the "Recaller", a device that retrieves visual memories, she interviews witnesses whose recollections eventually lead her to Mia, who had witnessed the crash from her window. Shazia uses the Recaller on Mia and views her memories of the two murders, despite Mia's attempts to suppress them. Mia kills Shazia and uses the Recaller to confirm that Shazia's husband knows her whereabouts. Mia subsequently murders him at their home and kills their infant son to eliminate witnesses. Police use the Recaller on the family's pet guinea pig, allowing them to track Mia down to her son's school production. Cast: Andrea Riseborough, Kiran Sonia Sawar, Andrew Gower, Anthony Welsh, and Claire Rushbrook
17	4	"Hang the DJ"	Tim Van Patten	Charlie Brooker	29 December 2017
Frank and Amy use an electronic device called "Coach" which chooses their relationship partners and durations. Coach will eventually assign them lifelong partners, with a 99.8% success rate. They are matched for 12 hours, and then each given a match lasting several months. Amy's ends and she is given a series of 36-hour relationships; when Frank's ends, the pair are rematched. They get on well until Frank violates an agreement they had not to look at the expiry date—initially five years, but his action causes Coach to recalculate the period to 20 hours. Amy and Frank leave on bad terms but fail to enjoy future matches. The day before they are paired with their lifelong partners, they reunite and Amy encourages Frank to rebel. As they escape, the world fades away: it was a simulated reality used by a dating app to determine the real-life Frank and Amy's compatibility. Cast: Georgina Campbell and Joe Cole
18	5	"Metalhead"	David Slade	Charlie Brooker	29 December 2017
The episode is filmed in black and white. Bella journeys to a warehouse with Anthony and Clarke. A robotic guard known as a "dog" kills Anthony and chases the others as they drive away in separate cars. The dog jumps into Clarke's car and kills him, then pursues Bella in it. The dog enters Bella's car, and she exits as the car topples off the edge of a cliff. Via walkie-talkie, Bella leaves someone a brief message for her loved ones in case of death. The dog finds her and she climbs a tree to escape it, draining it of power by throwing things at it. As it recharges, she makes her way into a compound. When the dog tracks her down, she blinds it with paint and destroys it with a shotgun, but its shrapnel embeds trackers in her body, including one in her jugular vein. She says a final goodbye into a walkie-talkie, unsure if she can be heard. As she puts a knife to her throat, dogs swarm over the area, including the warehouse where Bella and her friends were trying to retrieve a box of teddy bears. Cast: Maxine Peake
19	6	"Black Museum"	Colm McCarthy	Charlie Brooker	29 December 2017
Nish visits the Black Museum run by Rolo Haynes, a former recruiter for experimental medical technologies. One exhibit features a device that allowed Dr. Peter Dawson to feel his patients' physical sensations to aid diagnoses. Dawson developed an addiction with pain and fell into a coma after killing a homeless man to experience death firsthand. Another exhibit displays a toy monkey containing the consciousness of a woman who fell into a coma; her mind was initially transferred into her husband's head, but after several arguments, she was moved into the toy, which her child soon abandoned. The museum's main attraction is a sentient hologram of Clayton Leigh, a man executed via electric chair for murder. Visitors can pull a lever to execute the hologram and receive a souvenir—a digital copy of Clayton trapped in a loop of electrocution. When Haynes suddenly becomes ill, Nish reveals she poisoned his water and is Clayton's daughter. She transfers Haynes' consciousness into the hologram and pulls the lever, releasing Clayton and killing Haynes, and takes a souvenir recording of Haynes' electrocution. Nish retrieves the still-conscious toy monkey before setting fire to the museum and driving away. She speaks to her deceased mother, whose consciousness resides in her mind. Cast: Douglas Hodge and Letitia Wright

=== Interactive film (2018) ===
Title	Directed by	Written by	Original release date
Bandersnatch	David Slade	Charlie Brooker	28 December 2018
Bandersnatch is an interactive film, where viewer choices affect the storyline. Stefan Butler, a young programmer, works on a video game adaptation of a "choose your own adventure" book, Bandersnatch. He successfully pitches it to Tuckersoft in a meeting with the head Mohan Thakur and the game developer Colin Ritman. Stefan becomes stressed while working from home and attends therapy. The viewer can see Stefan talking about his mother's death. Stefan can take hallucinogens with Colin and hear his alternate timeline theories. In many storylines, Stefan feels controlled by outside forces, as did the original author of Bandersnatch. Stefan may discover that his father and therapist are running an experiment on him, travel back through time and go with his mother onto the train that crashed and killed her, or kill his father and sometimes Mohan or Colin. The game's success upon release depends on the viewers' choices, as does whether Stefan is imprisoned and the game pulled. Some endings show Colin's daughter trying to adapt Bandersnatch into an interactive film. Cast: Fionn Whitehead, Craig Parkinson, Alice Lowe, Asim Chaudhry, and Will Poulter

=== Series 5 (2019) ===
No. overall	No. in series	Title	Directed by	Written by	Original release date
20	1	"Striking Vipers"	Owen Harris	Charlie Brooker	5 June 2019
Danny hosts a birthday party with his wife Theo. His old friend Karl introduces him to the latest Striking Vipers fighting game that they used to play together. The new game is experienced in virtual reality, allowing players to feel physical sensations through their characters. That night, Danny and Karl play as Lance and Roxette, respectively. After a round of fighting, their characters fall on each other and kiss, and the two begin having sex within the game. On their wedding anniversary, Theo confronts Danny about his withdrawn behavior and he ends his arrangement with Karl. At Danny's next birthday, Theo invites Karl, and despite initial arguing, Danny and Karl resume having virtual sex. They try kissing in real life, but agree there is no romantic connection between them. A physical fight results in their overnight arrest. Later, as part of an agreement, Danny plays Striking Vipers with Karl while Theo goes to a bar without her wedding ring and meets strangers. Cast: Anthony Mackie, Yahya Abdul-Mateen II, Nicole Beharie, Pom Klementieff, and Ludi Lin
21	2	"Smithereens"	James Hawes	Charlie Brooker	5 June 2019
At group therapy, Chris meets Hayley, whose daughter died by suicide. He has sex with her and watches her make her daily three attempts to log into her daughter's account on Persona. One day, Chris—a rideshare driver—abducts Jaden, an intern at the social media company Smithereen, at gunpoint. Police chase after them until Chris comes to a stop in a field. Chris contacts Jaden's superior and demands to speak to Smithereen's CEO, Billy Bauer, who is on a solitary retreat. Smithereen employees gather information on Chris while he forces the hostage negotiator to leave. After a final ultimatum from Chris, Billy agrees to speak to him. Chris explains that he was checking a Smithereen notification while driving when a drunk driver collided with him, killing the driver and Chris's fiancée. Chris makes clear his intention to kill himself, and as a favour Billy gets Persona's CEO to give Hayley her daughter's password. Jaden tries to force Chris's gun away from him to prevent his suicide, and a police sniper is ordered to shoot into the car. Cast: Andrew Scott, Damson Idris, and Topher Grace
22	3	"Rachel, Jack and Ashley Too"	Anne Sewitsky	Charlie Brooker	5 June 2019
Rachel and Jack live with their father, who is working on a mousetrap alternative. For her fifteenth birthday, Rachel gets an AI toy, Ashley Too, based on the pop star Ashley O. She dances to an Ashley O song at a school talent competition, but falls and leaves embarrassed. Meanwhile, Ashley O is beginning to rebel against Catherine—her controlling manager and aunt. Catherine puts medication in her food to render Ashley O comatose. When the Ashley Too doll learns of Ashley O's coma, it malfunctions. Jack uses her father's computer to remove a limiter on the doll, causing it to gain full consciousness, as it was made from a clone of Ashley O. Rachel and Jack go with the doll to Ashley O's house. While Jack poses as a mouse catcher, Rachel and Ashley Too unplug Ashley O from a medication drip and she regains consciousness. After rendering two of Catherine's staff unconscious, they crash a venue where Catherine is unveiling Ashley Eternal, a holographic Ashley O to perform on music tours, and reveal that Ashley O is awake. Later, Ashley O performs alternative music with Jack under the name "Ashley Fuckn O". Cast: Miley Cyrus, Angourie Rice, Madison Davenport and Susan Pourfar

=== Series 6 (2023) ===
For series six, Nielsen Media Research reported that Black Mirror was the most-watched television programme on streaming platforms in the United States during the week of its release, with an estimated 23 million hours watched. In the following weeks it ranked second and fifth, with a cumulative 40 million hours watched.

Netflix, which started releasing viewing figures after series five, stated that 60 million hours of Black Mirror's sixth series were watched worldwide during its week of release. According to Netflix's ranking method, it was second to Never Have I Ever's fourth series by viewer count. By the end of June, its hours of viewing reached 140 million, in addition to 110 million hours of other Black Mirror views. (Note: Hours watched for Bandersnatch: 2.9 million. For series 1 to 5, in order: 20.1 million, 15.9 million, 25.4 million, 24.2 million and 23.4 million.) This placed the sixth series 53rd in Netflix content across all views from January to June 2023.

No. overall	No. in series	Title	Directed by	Written by	Original release date
23	1	"Joan Is Awful"	Ally Pankiw	Charlie Brooker	15 June 2023
Joan finds that the events of her day are being retold in near-real time in a television programme, Joan Is Awful. The streaming service Streamberry is legally able to do so as she signed their terms and conditions; a quantum computer produces the show using computer-generated imagery (CGI). She is portrayed by a virtual actor version of Salma Hayek. To get Hayek's attention, Joan defecates in a church while dressed as a cheerleader. Joan and Hayek—who is unhappy with how her likeness is being used—break into Streamberry's office to destroy the quantum computer. They learn that they are in a simulated reality, and Joan is a likeness of Annie Murphy based on a Source Joan; both destroy their quantum computers, destroying the simulated realities. Source Joan is placed under house arrest alongside the real Annie Murphy and achieves her dream job by starting a coffee shop. Cast: Annie Murphy and Salma Hayek
24	2	"Loch Henry"	Sam Miller	Charlie Brooker	15 June 2023
Davis and Pia, partners who met in a film course, visit Davis's mother Janet in the Scottish countryside and meet Davis's friend Stuart, who owns the last remaining pub in Loch Henry. When Pia learns about Iain Adair, a local serial killer who tortured tourists, she convinces Davis to make a documentary about him. Pia, Davis, and Stuart break into Adair's basement to gather footage. While viewing Janet's old VHS tapes of Bergerac, Pia discovers that Janet and Davis's late father participated in Adair's crimes. She flees the house and evades Janet's pursuit but fatally falls into a river. Janet hangs herself beside evidence of her involvement. A BAFTA-winning true crime documentary about Loch Henry is released with Davis's involvement, reviving tourism at Stuart's pub. Alone in a hotel room, Davis rereads Janet's suicide note: "For your film. Mum." Cast: John Hannah, Samuel Blenkin, Myha'la Herrold, Daniel Portman, and Monica Dolan
25	3	"Beyond the Sea"	John Crowley	Charlie Brooker	15 June 2023
In an alternate history 1969, the astronauts Cliff and David can transfer their consciousness to replicas of their bodies on Earth when not needed on the spaceship. David is trapped on the ship after his family is killed and his replica destroyed by a cult. Cliff and his wife Lana allow David limited use of Cliff's replica. Lana embraces David, in Cliff's replica, when he cries in front of her. On Earth, David begins an oil painting of Cliff's family home. David becomes infatuated with Lana over their visits and makes sexual advances towards her while dancing to "La Mer". Lana ultimately rejects his advances and Cliff discovers David has been drawing her naked on the ship and punches David. When Cliff takes a spacewalk, David uses his replica to kill his family. Aboard the ship, David offers Cliff a seat. Cast: Aaron Paul, Josh Hartnett, and Kate Mara
26	4	"Mazey Day"	Uta Briesewitz	Charlie Brooker	15 June 2023
In 2006, paparazza Bo takes photos of a male celebrity's affair with a man, leading to his suicide. She decides to leave the industry but struggles to make ends meet. Meanwhile, the actress Mazey Day quits filming in the Czech Republic after a hit and run; $30,000 is offered for the first photographs of her. Motivated by the offer, Bo tracks Mazey down and pursues her to a New Age rehabilitation centre. She and three other paparazzi find Mazey tied up and take pictures. Bo releases her and Mazey transforms into a werewolf. The werewolf kills two paparazzi as Bo and the paparazzo Hector flee to a nearby restaurant, where a police officer is dining. Bo fails to convince the police officer of the situation's urgency. The werewolf kills all those in the diner except Bo, who manages to shoot her with the deceased officer's gun. Mazey returns to human form, bloodied and begging for death. Bo places the gun in her hand. Using Hector's camera, Bo prepares to take a photograph of Mazey holding the gun to her head. A gunshot is heard. Cast: Zazie Beetz, Clara Rugaard, and Danny Ramirez
27	5	"Demon 79"	Toby Haynes	Charlie Brooker & Bisha K. Ali	15 June 2023
A title card introduces the episode as a Red Mirror film. In 1979, Nida works at a department store, where she faces hostility from her colleagues, the National Front, and Conservative politician Michael Smart. She discovers a talisman that summons Gaap, a demon on his first assignment, who appears as Boney M.'s Bobby Farrell. Gaap tells Nida she must kill three people in as many days to stop the world from ending. She first kills a man who molests his daughter. Next, she murders a man who had killed his wife and also kills his brother, who arrives as she is leaving. Because the murderer's death is discounted, one target remains: Smart, who is shown in a vision to become Prime Minister with an ultra-nationalist agenda. Nida drives him off the road but is arrested before he dies. At midnight, as Nida is interrogated, nuclear war breaks out. Nida joins Gaap, who has been outcast by the demons, in an eternal void. Cast: Anjana Vasan and Paapa Essiedu

=== Series 7 (2025) ===
No. overall	No. in series	Title	Directed by	Written by	Original release date
28	1	"Common People"	Ally Pankiw	Teleplay by : Charlie Brooker; Story by : Charlie Brooker & Bisha K. Ali	10 April 2025
Teacher Amanda and welder Mike are a happy couple who want a child. After Amanda falls ill with a brain tumor, Mike agrees to a contract with the start-up Rivermind to restore her brain function remotely for a monthly fee. The company's servers wirelessly supplement her lost cognitive abilities. As a result, Amanda sleeps excessively and is unable to travel beyond Rivermind's service areas. She begins reciting advertisements involuntarily, causing issues at her job. Mike secretly funds an ad-free "Plus" version of the service by performing humiliating acts on a livestreaming platform. With excess money, he purchases a limited-time subscription for Rivermind "Lux", which allows them to alter sensory experiences through an app. After Mike is exposed for his online activities and assaults a coworker, he is fired, leaving them unable to afford the Plus subscription. They are also informed that Amanda's potential pregnancy would incur additional fees. A year later, Mike sells their unused crib and, at Amanda's request, smothers her with a pillow as she recites an advertisement. He enters his streaming room holding a box cutter and closes the door behind him. Cast: Rashida Jones, Chris O'Dowd, Tracee Ellis Ross
29	2	"Bête Noire"	Toby Haynes	Charlie Brooker	10 April 2025
Maria, an R&D food scientist for a confectionery company, recognizes former classmate Verity during a focus group test. After Verity is instantly hired for a research assistant position, Maria begins noticing subtle discrepancies in her life, such as the name of the fast-food chain her boyfriend worked at. She also finds similar inconsistencies in her work, like the absence of an ingredient she had specifically identified in a new product, and blames Verity, whom she remembers was bullied in school. Maria attempts to use security footage to accuse Verity of drinking a coworker's milk from the communal refrigerator; however, the footage reveals that Maria committed the act, leading to her termination. Later, Maria breaks into Verity's home and discovers she has built a quantum computer capable of manipulating reality. Controlling it through her pendant, Verity had been using it to exact revenge on her bullies, including Maria, who spread rumors about her in school. Maria kills Verity, seizes control of the computer and pendant, and manifests a reality where she is empress of the universe. Cast: Siena Kelly, Rosy McEwen, Ben Bailey Smith
30	3	"Hotel Reverie"	Haolu Wang	Charlie Brooker	10 April 2025
Hollywood star Brandy Friday is invited by the entertainment technology company ReDream, who agrees to remake a classic romantic film, Hotel Reverie, by immersing her consciousness into the story using AI-based virtual production technology. Brandy stars opposite a re-creation of actress Dorothy Chambers, and throughout the remaking, they fall further in love. However, the ReDream technology malfunctions, and everyone within the film, except Brandy and Dorothy, is frozen in time; the two spend countless romantic days together. The now self-aware Dorothy discovers that her "real" counterpart died of heartbreak due to not being able to be with her female lover. When the ReDream technology starts up again, time is reset to the moment the initial malfunction occurred, leaving Dorothy and Brandy heartbroken. The film concludes, and Brandy is extracted. Months later, ReDream sends Brandy a phone to talk to an AI simulacrum of Dorothy, with Dorothy telling Brandy she has "all the time in the world." Cast: Issa Rae, Awkwafina, Emma Corrin, Harriet Walter, Enzo Cilenti
31	4	"Plaything"	David Slade	Charlie Brooker	10 April 2025
Cameron Walker, a PC Zone reviewer, is arrested for shoplifting and the murder of an unidentified person. He recounts his past, detailing his encounter as a young man with eccentric programmer Colin Ritman and his unique life simulation game, Thronglets. Becoming deeply attached to the digital creatures, Cameron's connection intensifies after using LSD, seemingly allowing him to understand them and fostering their communication. When a houseguest, Lump, mistreats and "kills" the Thronglets, Cameron violently murders him and hides the body. Over the years, Cameron dedicates himself to enhancing the Thronglets' existence, even surgically creating a brain port for them to live within him. During interrogation, instead of identifying the body, Cameron transmits code via a graphic to the central government server. This code allows the Thronglets to hijack the emergency broadcast system, sending a signal intended to reprogram human brains for peace and eliminate conflict. As the signal ends, Cameron smiles, believing he has revolutionized human life. Cast: Peter Capaldi, Lewis Gribben, James Nelson-Joyce, Michele Austin, Asim Chaudhry, Will Poulter
32	5	"Eulogy"	Chris Barrett & Luke Taylor	Charlie Brooker & Ella Road	10 April 2025
Phillip is contacted by a company called Eulogy that collects immersive photo memories for memorials following the death of his ex-girlfriend Carol. Initially reluctant, he provides early photos where Carol's face is obscured, but technology allows him to "walk through" the photos with a woman only known as The Guide. He then reveals numerous defaced photos of Carol, revealing their strained relationship, which culminated in Carol discovering his infidelity, followed by his failed marriage proposal in London. The Guide reveals she is Carol's daughter, conceived during a one-night stand taken in retaliation. Phillip finds an undeveloped disposable camera from the trip, revealing a photo of a trashed room and an unread letter from Carol. In the letter, she asks Phillip to forgive her and meet her after her next shift if he is willing to move forward with her and the child she has chosen to keep. Having never seen the letter until now, Phillip is consumed with regret, realizing she had waited for him and he never came. He finally remembers Carol's face and attends her funeral in London, where her daughter plays the cello. Cast: Paul Giamatti, Patsy Ferran
33	6	"USS Callister : Into Infinity"	Toby Haynes	Charlie Brooker, Bisha K. Ali, William Bridges & Bekka Bowling	10 April 2025
The USS Callister crew, digital clones within the game Infinity, become space pirates to survive on stolen in-game credits while planning to hack the servers to create their own space. To do so, they require Walt, a respawned clone of CEO James Walton. In the real world, a reporter's questions about rogue players and Robert Daly's illegal cloning alert programmer Nanette, who enters the game with James to identify the clones. They and Nan (Nanette's clone) locate Walt. James kills a clone to avoid legal exposure and is removed from the game. Walt leads the crew to the Heart of Infinity, where they discover a digital clone of Robert and his cloning technology. Robert offers Nan a choice: merge her consciousness with the comatose real-world Nanette, erasing the crew in the process, or transfer the crew and another clone of Nan to a private server while keeping her behind to accompany him. Nan agrees to the private server but refuses to remain with Robert, angering him. James returns disguised as Walt and lures hostile players to attack the Callister. Nan kills Robert, triggering the game's self-destruct, and activates "copy and paste" to merge the crew with Nanette's consciousness. Infinity is wiped, James is arrested, and Nan and the crew are thrust into the real world. Cast: Cristin Milioti, Jesse Plemons, Jimmi Simpson, Billy Magnussen, Milanka Brooks, Osy Ikhile, Paul G. Raymond

== Home media ==
Home media release
Series	Release dates
Series	Region 2 / B
1	27 February 2012
2	6 May 2013
Special	9 February 2015
1, 2, Special	9 February 2015
3	27 November 2017
4	31 December 2018
