= List of awards and nominations received by Black Mirror =

Awards and nominations received by Black Mirror
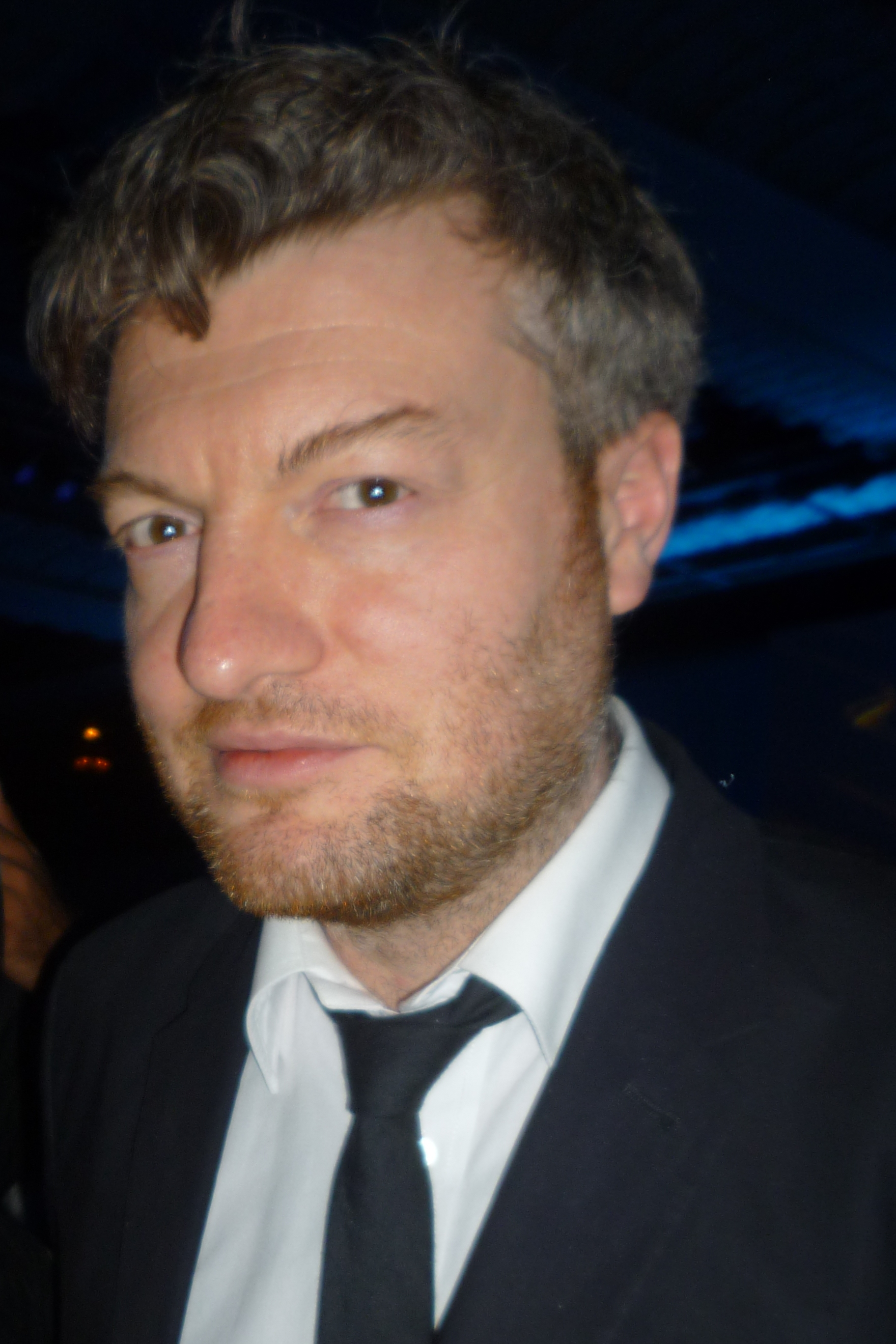
- Charlie Brooker is the series creator, and has received seven awards for his work on Black Mirror.
Awards and nominations
Award	Wins	Nominations
American Cinema Editors Awards	0	1
Art Directors Guild Awards	1	3
BAFTA Television Awards	4	24
British Society of Cinematographers Awards	0	1
Black Reel Awards	0	5
BPG TV & Radio Awards	1	1
Broadcast Awards	1	3
Casting Society of America Awards	0	1
Cinema Audio Society Awards	1	2
Costume Designers Guild Awards	0	1
Critics' Choice Super Awards	2	2
Dorian Awards	0	1
Emmy Awards	9	16
Fangoria Chainsaw Awards	0	2
GLAAD Media Awards	1	1
Golden Reel Awards	1	4
Golden Trailer Awards	1	1
Guild of Music Supervisors Awards	0	1
Hugo Awards	0	2
IGN Awards	1	2
Location Managers Guild Awards	0	1
Make-Up Artists and Hair Stylists Guild Awards	0	1
MTV Movie & TV Awards	0	1
NAACP Image Awards	0	1
Nebula Awards	1	1
Peabody Awards	1	1
People's Choice Awards	0	1
Producers Guild of America Awards	2	4
Rondo Hatton Classic Horror Awards	0	2
Rose d'Or Awards	1	1
RTS Awards	1	5
Satellite Awards	0	1
Saturn Awards	0	2
Screen Actors Guild Awards	0	1
Visual Effects Society Awards	0	2

Totals (Note: Certain award groups do not simply award one winner. They acknowledge several different recipients, have runners-up, and have third place. Since this is a specific recognition and is different from losing an award, runner-up mentions are considered wins in this award tally. For simplification and to avoid errors, each award in this list has been presumed to have had a prior nomination.)
- Wins: 29
- Nominations: 99

Black Mirror is a British science fiction anthology series created by Charlie Brooker. From 2011 to 2013, the first two series aired on British network Channel 4, as did the special "White Christmas" (2014); the following five series were released on the American streaming platform Netflix from 2016 to 2025. There are thirty-three episodes in the show's first seven series, and an additional interactive film Bandersnatch (2019). Inspired by The Twilight Zone, each episode of Black Mirror is standalone and explores the common theme of technology and its side-effects.

Black Mirror has received positive reception from critics (Note: On Rotten Tomatoes, series 1 received a 97% rating, series 2 received an 86% rating and "White Christmas" received a 93% rating. Series 3 holds an 86% rating on Rotten Tomatoes and a score of 82 on Metacritic; series 4 holds an 84% rating on Rotten Tomatoes and a score of 72 on Metacritic. Bandersnatch holds a 72% rating on Rotten Tomatoes and a score of 61 on Metacritic. Series 5 holds a rating of 68% on Rotten Tomatoes and a score of 66 on Metacritic.) and has been nominated for ninety-nine awards, winning twenty-nine of them. The most acclaimed episodes are "USS Callister", which won four Emmy Awards, and "San Junipero", which won two. Additionally, the interactive film Black Mirror: Bandersnatch won two Emmy Awards. As actors rarely appear in more than one episode, the only people to receive multiple awards for their work on the show are writer Charlie Brooker, who has won seven, and executive producer Annabel Jones, who has won four. The series has been nominated for twenty-four British Academy Television Awards, winning four, and fifteen Emmy Awards, winning nine.

== Statistics ==
=== Episodes ===
Nineteen of the show's twenty-seven episodes have received awards or nominations, including those given to specific people for their work on the episode. The interactive film Black Mirror: Bandersnatch has also received awards and nominations.

Number of awards and nominations by episode
Episode	Awards	Nominations
"The National Anthem"	0	1
"Fifteen Million Merits"	0	1
"Be Right Back"	0	1
"White Christmas"	0	4
"Nosedive"	0	6
"Playtest"	0	4
"San Junipero"	6	10
"Men Against Fire"	0	1
"USS Callister"	7	21
"Arkangel"	0	1
"Hang the DJ"	0	4
"Metalhead"	1	2
"Black Museum"	0	3
Black Mirror: Bandersnatch	5	12
"Striking Vipers"	0	3
"Smithereens"	0	2
"Rachel, Jack and Ashley Too"	0	1
"Joan Is Awful"	2	2
"Beyond the Sea"	0	4
"Demon 79"	4	2

=== People ===
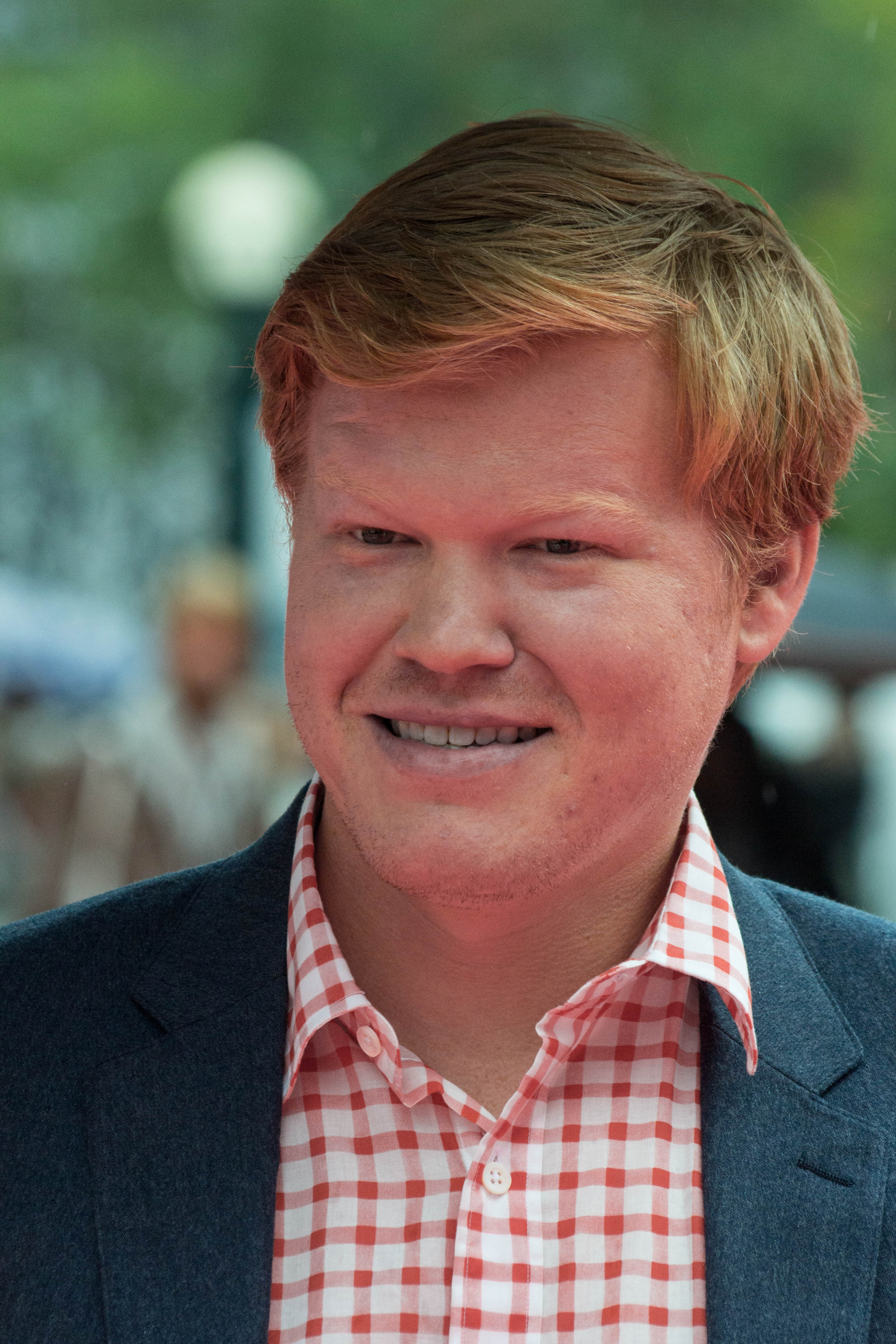
Jesse Plemons, appearing in series four episode "USS Callister", has been nominated for an Emmy Award and a Saturn Award.

Fifteen people have received two or more nominations for their work on Black Mirror.

Number of awards and nominations by person
Person	Role	Awards	Nominations
Charlie Brooker	Executive producer; writer	7	13
Annabel Jones	Executive producer	4	7
Joel Collins	Production designer	2	5
Kenny Clark	Sound editor	2	4
Russell McLean	Visual effects producer	2	4
Michael Maroussas	Dialogue editor	2	3
Tim Cavagin	Re-recording mixer	1	2
William Bridges	Writer	1	2
Tanya Lodge	Make-up designer	1	2
John Rodda	Sound mixer	1	2
Louise Sutton	Producer	1	2
Justin Hutchinson-Chatburn	Visual effects supervisor	0	2
Seamus McGarvey	Director of photography	0	2
Stephan Pehrsson	Director of photography	0	2
Jesse Plemons	Actor	0	2
Letitia Wright	Actor	0	2

== Art Directors Guild Awards ==
The Art Directors Guild present the ADG Excellence in Production Design Awards for American film, television and other media with outstanding production design.

Art Directors Guild Awards and nominations received by Black Mirror
Year	Category	Nominee(s)	Result	Ref.
2017	Excellence in Production Design for a Television Movie or Limited Series	Joel Collins, James Foster and Nicholas Palmer (Episodes: "Nosedive", "Playtest", "San Junipero")	Nominated	
2018	Excellence in Production Design for a Television Movie or Limited Series	Joel Collins (Episode: "USS Callister")	Won	
2020	Excellence in Production Design for a Television Movie or Limited Series	Anne Beauchamp (Episode: "Striking Vipers")	Nominated	
2026	Excellence in Production Design for a Television Movie or Limited Series	Miranda Jones (Episode: "USS Callister: Into Infinity")	Nominated	

== BAFTA Awards ==
The British Academy of Film and Television Arts (BAFTA) was founded in 1947 under the name British Film Academy to recognise excellence in the British film industry. In 1958, they merged with the Guild of Television Producers and Directors, and began to give awards to British television programmes. In 2000, television awards were split into the British Academy Television Awards, given for work in production, and the British Academy Television Craft Awards, presented for technical achievements.

=== BAFTA Television Awards ===
BAFTA Television Awards and nominations received by Black Mirror
Year	Category	Nominee(s)	Result	Ref.
2014	Best Single Drama	Black Mirror (Episode: "Be Right Back")	Nominated	
2018	Best Single Drama	"Hang the DJ"	Nominated	
2018	Best Actor	Joe Cole (Episode: "Hang the DJ")	Nominated	
2018	Best Supporting Actor	Jimmi Simpson (Episode: "USS Callister")	Nominated	
2019	Best Single Drama	Black Mirror: Bandersnatch	Nominated	
2024	Best Limited Drama	"Demon 79"	Nominated	
2024	Best Actress	Anjana Vasan (Episode: "Demon 79")	Nominated	

=== BAFTA Television Craft Awards ===
BAFTA Craft Awards and nominations received by Black Mirror
Year	Category	Nominee(s)	Result	Ref.
2012	Best Production Design	Joel Collins and Daniel May (Episode: "Fifteen Million Merits")	Nominated	
2017	Best Make Up and Hair Design	Tanya Lodge (Episode: "San Junipero")	Won	
2017	Best Special, Visual and Graphic Effects	Justin Hutchinson-Chatburn, Framestore, Glassworks, Baseblack (Episode: "Playtest")	Nominated	
2017	Best Costume Design	Susie Coulthard (Episode: "San Junipero")	Nominated	
2017	Best Photography and Lighting – Fiction	Seamus McGarvey (Episode: "Nosedive")	Nominated	
2018	Best Sound: Fiction	John Rodda, Tim Cavagin, Kenny Clark, Michael Maroussas (Episode: "USS Callister")	Nominated	
2018	Best Photography & Lighting: Fiction	Stephan Pehrsson (Episode: "USS Callister")	Nominated	
2018	Best Production Design	Joel Collins, Phil Sims (Episode: "USS Callister")	Nominated	
2018	Best Special, Visual Effects & Graphics	Dneg TV, Jean-clement Soret, Russell McLean, Joel Collins (Episode: "Metalhead")	Won	
2018	Best Writer: Drama	Charlie Brooker (Episode: "Hang the DJ")	Nominated	
2019	Best Special, Visual And Graphic Effects	Black Mirror: Bandersnatch	Nominated	
2019	Best Editing: Fiction	Tony Kearns (Episode: Black Mirror: Bandersnatch)	Nominated	
2024	Best Costume Design	Matthew Price (Episode: "Demon 79")	Nominated	
2024	Best Photography and Lighting: Fiction	Stephan Pehrsson (Episode: "Demon 79")	Won	
2024	Best Production Design	Udo Kramer (Episode: "Demon 79")	Nominated	
2024	Best Scripted Casting	Jina Jay (Episode: "Demon 79")	Nominated	
2024	Best Writer: Drama	Charlie Brooker, Bisha K. Ali (Episode: "Demon 79")	Won	
2026	Best Original Music: Fiction	Ariel Marx (Episode: "Hotel Reverie")	Nominated	
2026	Best Special, Visual and Graphic Effects	James MacLachlan, Josie Henwood, Union VFX, Stargate Studios Malta, Magic Lab, Sam Chynoweth (Episode: "USS Callister: Into Infinity")	Nominated	

== Black Reel Awards ==
Established in 2000 and presented by the Foundation for the Augmentation of African-Americans in Film, the Black Reel Awards are presented for African-American excellence in film and television. Initially limited to Hollywood, awards are now given to worldwide media.

Black Reel Awards and nominations received by Black Mirror
Year	Category	Nominee(s)	Result	Ref.
2018	Outstanding Television Movie or Limited Series	Charlie Brooker, Annabel Jones, Ian Hogan, Nick Pitt, Louise Sutton, Sanne Wohlenburg	Nominated	
2018	Outstanding Actress, TV Movie or Limited Series	Georgina Campbell (Episode: "Hang the DJ")	Nominated	
2018	Outstanding Supporting Actor, TV Movie or Limited Series	Babs Olusanmokun (Episode: "Black Museum")	Nominated	
2018	Outstanding Supporting Actress, TV Movie or Limited Series	Michaela Coel (Episode: "USS Callister")	Nominated	
2018	Outstanding Supporting Actress, TV Movie or Limited Series	Letitia Wright (Episode: "Black Museum")	Nominated	
2024	Outstanding Lead Performance in a TV Movie/Limited Series	Zazie Beetz (for "Mazy Day")	Nominated	

== Broadcast Awards ==
The Broadcast Awards, associated with the magazine Broadcast, are a series of awards given to British television programmes.

Broadcast Awards and nominations received by Black Mirror
Year	Category	Nominee(s)	Result	Ref.
2013	Best Single Drama	"The National Anthem"	Nominated	
2016	Best Single Drama	"White Christmas"	Nominated	
2018	Best Single Drama	"San Junipero"	Won	

== Cinema Audio Society Awards ==
These awards are presented by the American Cinema Audio Society for sound mixing in film and television.

Cinema Audio Society Awards and nominations received by Black Mirror
Year	Category	Nominee(s)	Result	Ref.
2017	Outstanding Achievement in Sound Mixing for a Television Movie or Mini-Series	Adrian Bell, Martin Jensen, Philip Clements, Rory de Carteret (Episode: "San Junipero")	Nominated	
2018	Outstanding Achievement in Sound Mixing for a Television Movie or Mini-Series	John Rodda, Tim Cavagin, Dafydd Archard, Will Miller, Nick Baldock and Sophia Hardman (Episode: "USS Callister")	Won	
2024	Outstanding Achievement in Sound Mixing for Non-Theatrical Motion Pictures or Limited Series	Richard Miller, James Ridgway, Daniel Kresco, James Hyde, Adam Mendez (Episode: "Beyond the Sea")	Nominated	
2026	Outstanding Achievement in Sound Mixing for Non-Theatrical Motion Pictures or Limited Series	Stuart Piggott, James Ridgway, Sam Okell, Mike Tehrani, Adam Mendez (Episode: "USS Callister: Into Infinity")	Nominated	

== Emmy Awards ==
Emmy Awards are given by the Academy of Television Arts & Sciences, an organisation founded in 1946, for television shows broadcast or available for download and streaming in America. The main award ceremony is the Primetime Emmy Award, whilst Creative Arts Emmy Awards are given in technical, creative and craft categories, and International Emmy Awards are presented to shows airing outside of the U.S.

Black Mirror won three consecutive awards in the Outstanding Television Movie category. In 2018, submissions were required to have a runtime of 75 minutes or more; Bandersnatch won with a nominal runtime of 90 minutes. Netflix also petitioned for "Smithereens" to be submitted in 2020, despite a 70-minute runtime. This was initially allowed, but it was later entered as Outstanding Drama Series instead. Critics for IndieWire disagreed that the series should have been eligible in the category as it is episodic; rule changes have been attributed to Black Mirror's success. In 2021, the Limited Series category expanded to include anthology series.

=== Emmy Awards ===
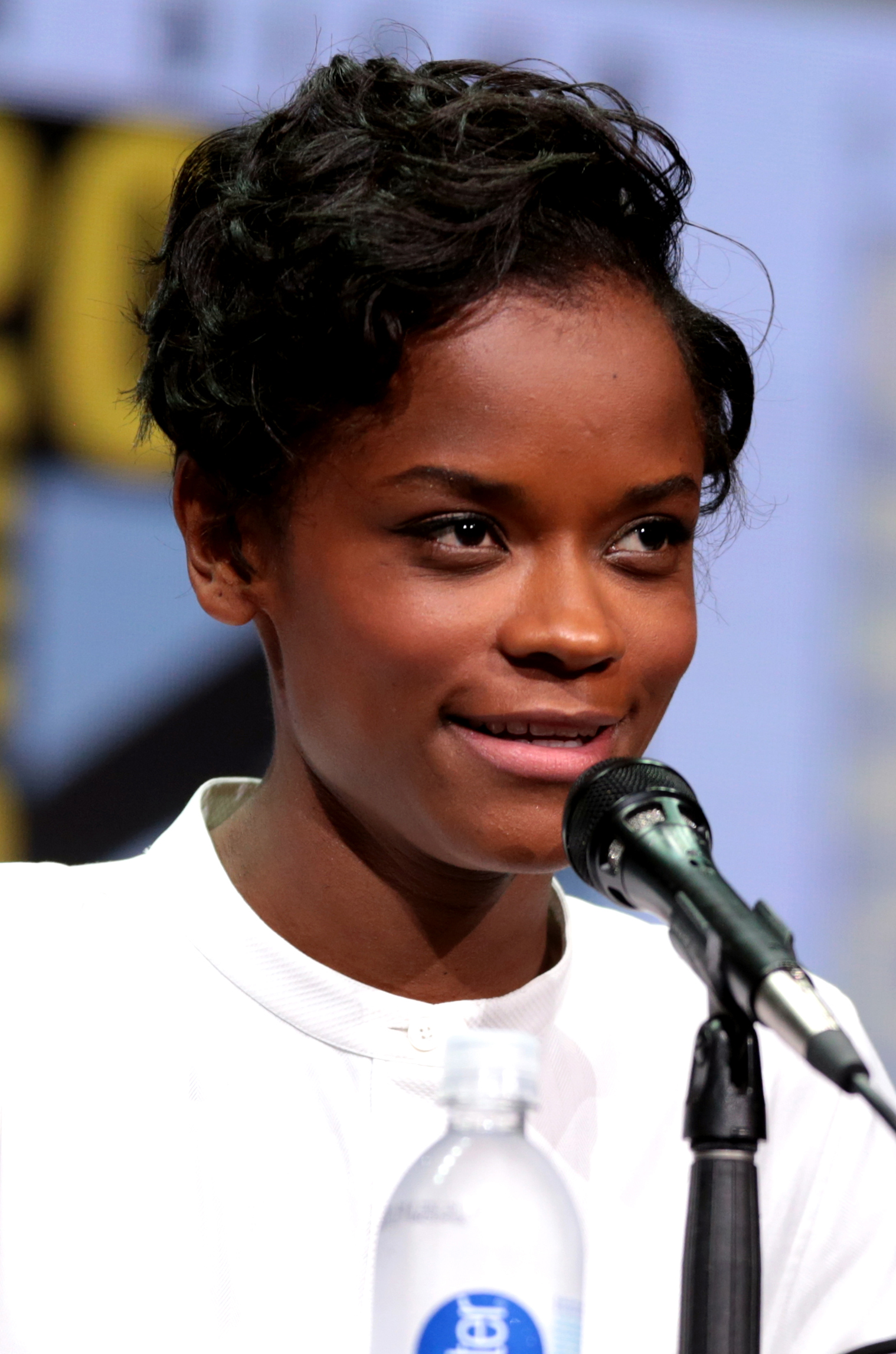
Letitia Wright, who appeared in series four episode "Black Museum" as Nish, was nominated for an Emmy.

Emmy Awards and nominations received by Black Mirror
Year	Category	Nominee(s)	Result	Ref.
2017	Outstanding Television Movie	"San Junipero" (Charlie Brooker, Annabel Jones, Laurie Borg)	Won	
2017	Outstanding Writing for a Limited Series, Movie, or Dramatic Special	Charlie Brooker (Episode: "San Junipero")	Won	
2017	Outstanding Cinematography for a Limited Series or Movie	Seamus McGarvey (Episode: "Nosedive")	Nominated	
2018	Outstanding Television Movie	"USS Callister" (Annabel Jones, Charlie Brooker, Louise Sutton)	Won	
2018	Outstanding Lead Actor in a Limited Series or Movie	Jesse Plemons (Episode: "USS Callister")	Nominated	
2018	Outstanding Writing for a Limited Series, Movie, or Dramatic Special	William Bridges and Charlie Brooker (Episode: "USS Callister")	Won	
2018	Outstanding Cinematography for a Limited Series or Movie	Stephan Pehrsson (Episode: "USS Callister")	Nominated	
2018	Outstanding Music Composition for a Limited Series, Movie, or Special	Daniel Pemberton (Episode: "USS Callister")	Nominated	
2018	Outstanding Single-Camera Picture Editing for a Limited Series or Movie	Selina MacArthur (Episode: "USS Callister")	Won	
2018	Outstanding Sound Editing for a Limited Series, Movie, or Special	Kenny Clark, Michael Maroussas, Dario Swade, Ricky Butt and Oliver Ferris (Episode: "USS Callister")	Won	
2018	Outstanding Supporting Actress in a Limited Series or Movie	Letitia Wright (Episode: "Black Museum")	Nominated	
2019	Outstanding Television Movie	Black Mirror: Bandersnatch (Annabel Jones, Russel McLean, Charlie Brooker)	Won	
2019	Outstanding Creative Achievement in Interactive Media Within a Scripted Program	Black Mirror: Bandersnatch	Won	
2020	Outstanding Guest Actor in a Drama Series	Andrew Scott (Episode: "Smithereens")	Nominated	
2024	Outstanding Writing for a Limited or Anthology Series or Movie	Charlie Brooker (Episode: "Joan Is Awful")	Nominated	
2024	Outstanding Picture Editing for a Limited or Anthology Series or Movie	Jon Harris (Episode: "Beyond the Sea")	Nominated	
2024	Outstanding Sound Mixing for a Limited or Anthology Series or Movie	James Ridgway, Richard Miller, Adam Méndez, and Daniel Kresco (Episode: "Beyond the Sea")	Nominated	
2025	Outstanding Limited or Anthology Series	Charlie Brooker, Jessica Rhoades, Annabel Jones, and Mark Kinsella	Nominated	
2025	Outstanding Lead Actress in a Limited or Anthology Series or Movie	Rashida Jones (Episode: "Common People")	Nominated	
2025	Outstanding Writing for a Limited or Anthology Series or Movie	Charlie Brooker and Bisha K. Ali (Episode: "Common People")	Nominated	
2025	Outstanding Casting for a Limited or Anthology Series or Movie	Jina Jay, Jeanie Bacharach, Corinne Clark and Jennifer Page	Nominated	
2025	Outstanding Music Composition for a Limited or Anthology Series, Movie or Special (Original Dramatic Score)	Ariel Marx (Episode: "Hotel Reverie")	Nominated	
2025	Outstanding Music Composition for a Limited or Anthology Series, Movie or Special (Original Dramatic Score)	Daniel Pemberton (Episode: "USS Callister: Into Infinity")	Nominated	
2025	Outstanding Sound Mixing for a Limited or Anthology Series or Movie	James Ridgway, Richard Miller, Adam Méndez, and Daniel Kresco (Episode: "USS Callister: Into Infinity")	Nominated	
2025	Outstanding Sound Editing for a Limited or Anthology Series, Movie or Special	Tom Jenkins, Alex Sawyer, James Hayday, Rob Davidson, Arthur Graley, Poppy Kavanagh, Oliver Ferris and Sue Harding (Episode: "USS Callister: Into Infinity")	Nominated	
2025	Outstanding Special Visual Effects in a Single Episode	James MacLachlan, Josie Henwood, Kübra Tanyel, David Schneider, Tallaulah Baker, Jane Paton, Jonathan Caruana, Filip Látal and Jamie Wood (Episode: "USS Callister: Into Infinity")	Nominated	
2025	Outstanding Fantasy/Sci-Fi Costumes	Matthew Price, Lisa Mitton, Alice Woodward, Jennifer Geach and Calum Watt (Episode: "USS Callister: Into Infinity")	Nominated	

=== International Emmy Awards ===
International Emmy Awards and nominations received by Black Mirror
Year	Category	Nominee(s)	Result	Ref.
2012	Best TV Movie/Miniseries	Black Mirror	Won	
2015	Best Performance by an Actor	Rafe Spall (Episode: "White Christmas")	Nominated	

== Fangoria Chainsaw Awards ==
The Fangoria Chainsaw Awards are given to horror and thriller films. In association with the fan magazine Fangoria, the awards have been given annually since 1992.

Fangoria Chainsaw Awards and nominations received by Black Mirror
Year	Category	Nominee(s)	Result	Ref.
2017	Best TV Series	Black Mirror	Nominated	
2019	Best Streaming Premiere Film	David Slade (Black Mirror: Bandersnatch)	Nominated	

== Golden Globe Awards ==
Golden Globe Awards and nominations received by Black Mirror
Year	Category	Nominee(s)	Result	Ref.
2026	Best Limited Series, Anthology Series, or Motion Picture Made for Television	Black Mirror	Nominated	
2026	Best Actor in a Limited Series, Anthology Series, or Motion Picture Made for Television	Paul Giamatti (Black Mirror: Eulogy)	Nominated	
2026	Best Actress in a Limited Series, Anthology Series, or Motion Picture Made for Television	Rashida Jones (Black Mirror: Common People)	Nominated	

== Golden Reel Awards ==
The Golden Reel Awards are presented by the Motion Picture Sound Editors, an American organisation founded in 1953. The awards are given for excellence in sound editing.

Golden Reel Awards and nominations received by Black Mirror
Year	Category	Nominee(s)	Result	Ref.
2018	Outstanding Achievement in Sound Editing — Episodic Long Form – Dialogue/ADR	Kenny Clark, Michael Maroussas (Episode: "USS Callister")	Won	
2018	Outstanding Achievement in Sound Editing — Episodic Long Form – Effects/Foley	Kenny Clark (Episode: "USS Callister")	Nominated	
2020	Outstanding Achievement in Sound Editing — Episodic Long Form – Effects/Foley	Steve Browell, Mathias Schuster, Barnaby Smyth (Episode: "Striking Vipers")	Nominated	
2024	Outstanding Achievement in Sound Editing – Non-Theatrical Feature	Antony Bayman, Alex Sawyer, Jane Lo, Adam Méndez, Rob Davidson, Sue Harding (Episode: "Beyond the Sea")	Nominated	

== Hugo Awards ==
The Hugo Awards are a series of science fiction awards which have been presented by the World Science Fiction Society since 1953. Formats recognised include literature, film and serial works.

Hugo Awards and nominations received by Black Mirror
Year	Category	Nominee(s)	Result	Ref.
2017	Best Dramatic Presentation, Short Form	Charlie Brooker, Owen Harris (Episode: "San Junipero")	Nominated	
2018	Best Dramatic Presentation, Short Form	William Bridges, Charlie Brooker and Toby Haynes (Episode: "USS Callister")	Nominated	

== IGN Awards ==
These awards are given by IGN Entertainment, an entertainment media company specialising in video games.

IGN Awards and nominations received by Black Mirror
Year	Category	Nominee(s)	Result	Ref.
2018	Best Streaming Exclusive	Black Mirror	Nominated	
2018	Best TV Episode	"San Junipero"	Won	

== Producers Guild of America Awards ==
The Producers Guild of America have held annual awards to recognise American film, television and new media since 1990.

Producers Guild of America Awards and nominations received by Black Mirror
Year	Category	Nominee(s)	Result	Ref.
2017	David L. Wolper Award for Outstanding Producer of Long-Form Television	Annabel Jones and Charlie Brooker	Nominated	
2018	David L. Wolper Award for Outstanding Producer of Long-Form Television	Annabel Jones and Charlie Brooker	Won	
2020	Outstanding Producer of Streamed or Televised Motion Pictures	Annabel Jones, Charlie Brooker and Kate Glover (Episode: "Striking Vipers")	Nominated	
2024	Outstanding Producer of Streamed or Televised Motion Pictures	Charlie Brooker, Jessica Rhoades and Annabel Jones (Episode: "Beyond the Sea")	Won	
2026	Outstanding Producer of Limited or Anthology Series Television	Charlie Brooker, Jessica Rhoades, Annabel Jones, Mark Kinsella (Episode: "Beyond the Sea")	Nominated	

== Royal Television Society Awards ==
Founded in 1927, the Royal Television Society—operating in the UK and Ireland—began awards ceremonies in 1975.

=== Royal Television Society Programme Awards ===
RTS Programme Awards and nominations received by Black Mirror
Year	Category	Nominee(s)	Result	Ref.
2016	Best Single Drama	"White Christmas"	Nominated	
2019	Best Single Drama	"USS Callister"	Nominated	

=== Royal Television Society Craft & Design Awards ===
RTS Craft & Design Awards and nominations received by Black Mirror
Year	Category	Nominee(s)	Result	Ref.
2015	Best Sound: Drama	Jim Goddard, Stuart Hilliker, Dan Green, Alastair Widgery (Episode: "White Christmas")	Nominated	
2017	Effects – Digital	Justin Hutchinson-Chatburn, Framestore, Glassworks, Painting Practice (Episode: "Playtest")	Nominated	
2017	Production Design – Drama	Joel Collins, James Foster (Episode: "Nosedive")	Won	

== Saturn Awards ==
The Academy of Science Fiction, Fantasy and Horror Films present the Saturn Awards for works of science fiction, fantasy and horror. Since 1973, the awards have been presented to American films, television programmes and other media.

Saturn Awards and nominations received by Black Mirror
Year	Category	Nominee(s)	Result	Ref.
2018	Best Guest Performance in a Television Series	Jesse Plemons (Episode: "USS Callister")	Nominated	
2018	Best New Media Television Series	Black Mirror	Nominated	
2023	Best Television Presentation	Black Mirror	Nominated	

== Visual Effects Society Awards ==
The American Visual Effects Society present the Visual Effects Society Awards to films, television shows, video games and commercials with outstanding visual effects.

Visual Effects Society Awards and nominations received by Black Mirror
Year	Category	Nominee(s)	Result	Ref.
2017	Outstanding Visual Effects in a Photoreal Episode	Justin Hutchinson-Chatburn, Russell McLean, Grant Walker, Christopher Gray (Episode: "Playtest")	Nominated	
2018	Outstanding Animated Character in an Episode or Real-Time Project	Steven Godfrey, Stafford Lawrence, Andrew Robertson, Lestyn Roberts (Episode: "Metalhead")	Nominated	

== Other awards ==
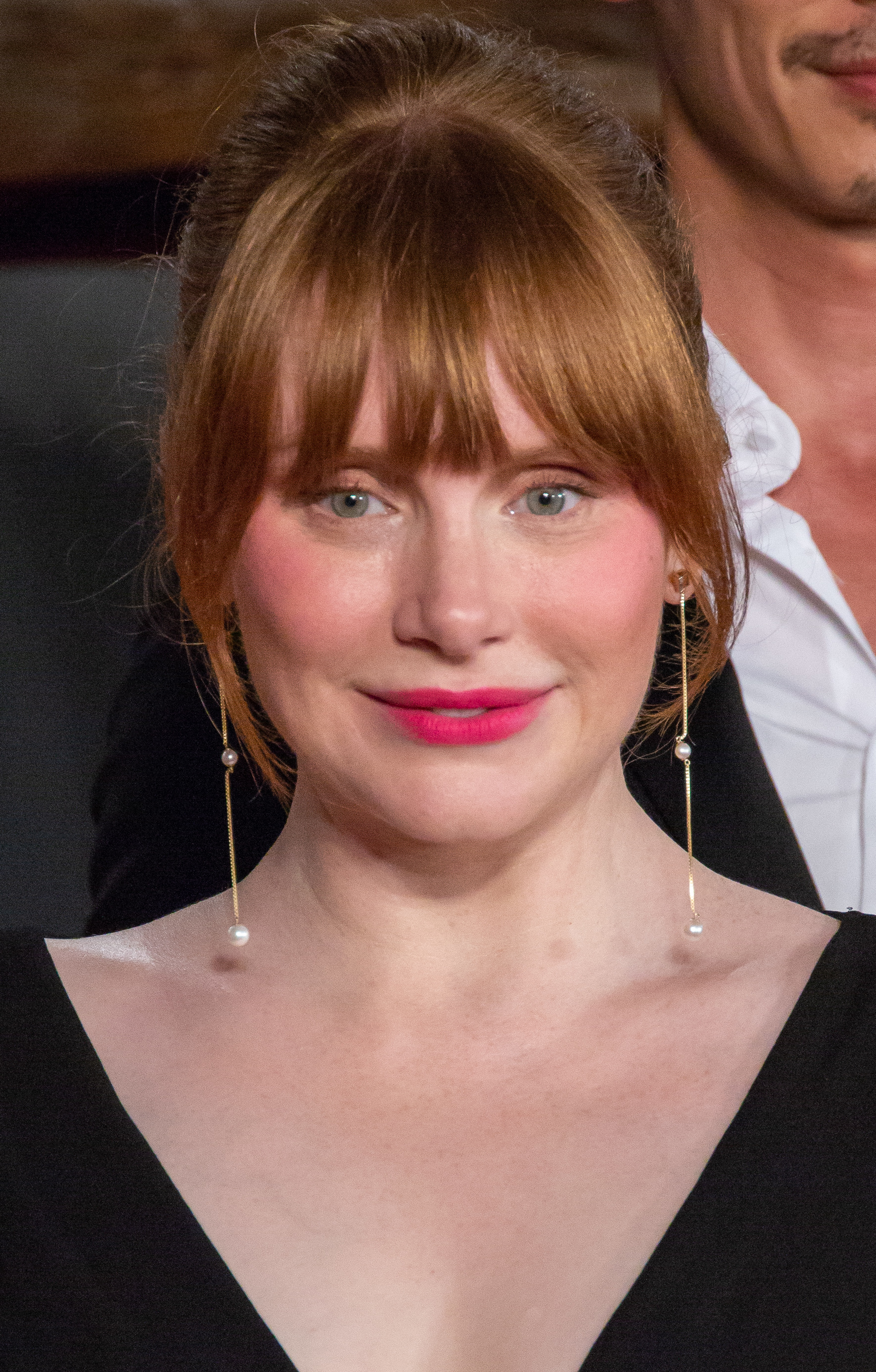
Bryce Dallas Howard was nominated for a Screen Actors Guild Award for appearing as the protagonist Lacie Pound in series three episode "Nosedive".

Other awards and nominations received by Black Mirror
Year	Award	Category	Nominee(s)	Result	Ref.
2012	Golden Rose	Comedy	Black Mirror	Won	
2014	Peabody Awards	Entertainment	Black Mirror	Won	
2017	Screen Actors Guild Awards	Outstanding Performance by a Female Actor in a Television Movie or Miniseries	Bryce Dallas Howard (Episode: "Nosedive")	Nominated	
2017	Satellite Awards	Best Television Series – Genre	Black Mirror	Nominated	
2017	NAACP Image Awards	Outstanding Writing in a Motion Picture – Television	Rashida Jones and Michael Schur (Episode: "Nosedive")	Nominated	
2017	GLAAD Media Awards	Outstanding Individual Episode (in a series without a regular LGBT character)	"San Junipero"	Won	
2017	Make-Up Artists and Hair Stylists Guild	Best Special Makeup Effects – Television Mini-Series or Motion Picture Made for Television	Kristyan Mallett and Tanya Lodge (Episode: "Men Against Fire")	Nominated	
2017	Dorian Awards	TV Drama of the Year	Black Mirror	Nominated	
2018	Costume Designers Guild Awards	Excellence in Fantasy Television Series	Maja Meschede (Episode: "USS Callister")	Nominated	
2018	Location Managers Guild Awards	Outstanding Locations in a Contemporary Television Series	Malcolm McCulloch (Episode: "Arkangel")	Nominated	
2018	MTV Movie & TV Awards	Most Frightened Performance	Cristin Milioti (Episode: "USS Callister")	Nominated	
2019	Broadcasting Press Guild TV and Radio Awards	Innovation Award	Black Mirror: Bandersnatch	Won	
2019	Rondo Hatton Classic Horror Awards	Best Television Presentation	Black Mirror: Bandersnatch	Nominated	
2019	Nebula Awards	Best Game Writing	Charlie Brooker (Black Mirror: Bandersnatch)	Won	
2019	Golden Trailer Awards	Best Drama/Action Poster for a TV/Streaming Series	Black Mirror: Bandersnatch	Won	
2020	Producers Guild Awards	Innovation Award	Black Mirror: Bandersnatch	Nominated	
2020	Casting Society of America	Film – Nontheatrical Release	Jina Jay (Black Mirror: Bandersnatch)	Nominated	
2020	Rondo Hatton Classic Horror Awards	Best Television Presentation	"Smithereens"	Nominated	
2020	Guild of Music Supervisors Awards	Song Written and/or Recorded for Television	Trent Reznor, Miley Cyrus and Amelia Hartley (Episode: "Rachel, Jack and Ashley Too")	Nominated	
2024	American Cinema Editors Awards	Best Edited Feature Film (Non-Theatrical)	Jon Harris (Episode: "Beyond the Sea")	Nominated	
2024	People's Choice Awards	The Sci-Fi/Fantasy Show of the Year	Black Mirror	Nominated	
2024	British Society of Cinematographers Awards	TV Drama Operators	Edward Clark (Episode: "Demon 79")	Nominated	
2024	Critics' Choice Super Awards	Best Science Fiction/Fantasy Series, Limited Series or Made-for-TV Movie	"Joan Is Awful"	Won	
2024	Critics' Choice Super Awards	Best Actress in a Science Fiction/Fantasy Series, Limited Series or Made-for-TV Movie	Annie Murphy (Episode: "Joan Is Awful")	Won	
2025	Golden Trailer Awards	Best Sound Editing (Trailer/Teaser) for a TV/Streaming Series	Netflix / Zealot (for "Season 7 Official Trailer")	Nominated	
2025	Golden Trailer Awards	Most Original (Trailer/Teaser) for a TV/Streaming Series	Netflix / Zealot (for "Season 7 Official Trailer")	Nominated	
2025	Golden Trailer Awards	Most Innovative Advertising for a TV/Streaming Series	Netflix / Zealot (for "Nubbin Entertainment")	Won	
2025	Critics' Choice Super Awards	Best Science Fiction/Fantasy Series, Limited Series or Made-for-TV Movie	Black Mirror	Nominated	
2025	Critics' Choice Super Awards	Best Actress in a Science Fiction/Fantasy Series, Limited Series or Made-for-TV Movie	Cristin Millioti (for "USS Callister: Into Infinity")	Nominated	
2025	Critics' Choice Super Awards	Best Villain in a Series, Limited Series or Made-for-TV Movie	Jesse Plemons (for "USS Callister: Into Infinity")	Nominated	
2025	Set Decorators Society of America Awards	Best Achievement in Décor/Design of a One Hour Contemporary Series	Ellie Shanks, Liz Ainley, Hannah Spice, Polly Davenport, Kate Marshall, Miranda Jones, Cristina Casali, Helen Scott, Robin Brown & Jennifer Morden	Nominated	
