= Do Not Disturb (2016 film) =

2016 British television comedy film

- Genre: Comedy
- Written by: Aschlin Ditta
- Directed by: Nigel Cole
- Starring: Catherine Tate; Miles Jupp; Sian Gibson; Steve Edge; Dylan Edwards; Milanka Brooks; Kierston Wareing; Colin Michael Carmichael; Penny Ryder
- Composer: Colin Towns
- Country of origin: United Kingdom
- Original language: English

Production
- Producer: Howard Ella
- Cinematography: John de Borman
- Editor: Laura Morrod
- Running time: 43 minutes
- Production company: Lonesome Pine Productions

Original release
- Network: Gold
- Release: 27 January 2016

Do Not Disturb is a 2016 British comedy-drama television film starring Catherine Tate and Miles Jupp as a couple who try to repair their marriage in a hotel room. Set in Stratford-upon-Avon, birthplace and burial place of playwright and poet William Shakespeare, the film premiered on Gold on 27 January 2016, coinciding with worldwide celebrations of the 400th anniversary of Shakespeare's death. It was written by Aschlin Ditta and directed by Nigel Cole.

The film became a reunion between Tate and Aschlin Ditta, who co-wrote the BBC sketch series The Catherine Tate Show (2004–2007).

== Cast ==
- Catherine Tate as Anna Wilson
- Miles Jupp as John Wilson
- Sian Gibson as Sheila
- Steve Edge as Neil
- Dylan Edwards as Luke
- Milanka Brooks as Svetlana
- Kierston Wareing as Julie
- Colin Michael Carmichael as Hungover Man
- Penny Ryder as Janet
