= Bekka Bowling =

British comedian and writer

- Born: c. 1988; Margate
- Occupations: comedian and writer

Bekka Bowling (born c. 1988) is a British stand-up comedian, actor and writer. Early in her career she was a runner-up at the Funny Women awards. She has acted for the BBC and she has been commissioned as a screenwriter. She has collaborated with Charlie Brooker to assist in writing the Netflix series Black Mirror.

== Life ==
Bowling was born about 1988 in Margate.

In 2011 she was runner up at the Funny Women awards. The competition was her first ever attempt at stand up comedy, and she dealt with edgy subjects like incest.

In 2016 she starred in the BBC Comedy "Limbo" as the pink-haired Neck with Ellie White and Sanjeev Bhaskar.

In 2019 she was a lead in the BBC's "Thanks for the memories" and the same year she led the ensemble of BBC film "Masters of Love" as the free-spirited Lily.

In 2020 she stepped back from acting to focus solely on her screenwriting after signing a development deal with a major US network.

In 2021 she was a writer and producer on David Weil's Solos, writing and creating Jenny's story for Constance Wu.

She was commissioned to adapt Beth O'Leary's novel The Switch into a screenplay for Amblin Partners in 2022.

She is credited along with William Bridges, Ella Road and Bisha K. Ali as co-writers of USS Callister: Into Infinity. This is the feature length episode of series seven of the Netflix series Black Mirror. Charlie Brooker is the lead writer and the episode was well received.
