= Cinema Audio Society Awards 2017 =

US film and television awards ceremony

54th CAS Awards

February 24, 2018

Motion Picture – Live Action:

Dunkirk

Motion Picture – Animated:

Coco

Motion Picture – Documentary:

Jane

The 54th Cinema Audio Society Awards will be held on February 24, 2018, in the Bunker Hill Ballroom of the OMNI Los Angeles Hotel at California Plaza, Los Angeles, honoring outstanding achievements in sound mixing in film and television of 2017.

== Winners and nominees ==
Outstanding Achievement in Sound Mixing for a Motion Picture – Live Action	Outstanding Achievement in Sound Mixing for a Motion Picture – Animated
Dunkirk – Production Mixer – Mark Weingarten, CAS; Re-recording Mixer – Gregg Landaker; Re-recording Mixer – Gary A. Rizzo, CAS; Scoring Mixer – Alan Meyerson, CAS; ADR Mixer – Thomas J. O’Connell; Foley Mixer – Scott Curtis; Baby Driver – Production Mixer – Mary H. Ellis, CAS; Re-recording Mixer – Julian Slater, CAS; Re-recording Mixer – Tim Cavagin; Scoring Mixer – Gareth Cousins, CAS; ADR Mixer – Mark Appleby; Foley Mixer – Glen Gathard; The Shape of Water – Production Mixer – Glen Gauthier; Re-recording Mixer – Christian T. Cooke, CAS; Re-recording Mixer – Brad Zoern, CAS; Scoring Mixer – Peter Cobbin; ADR Mixer – Chris Navarro, CAS; Foley Mixer – Peter Persaud, CAS; Star Wars: The Last Jedi – Production Mixer – Stuart Wilson, CAS; Re-recording Mixer – David Parker; Re-recording Mixer – Michael Semanick; Re-recording Mixer – Ren Klyce; Scoring Mixer – Shawn Murphy; ADR Mixer – Doc Kane, CAS; Foley Mixer – Frank Rinella; Wonder Woman – Production Mixer – Chris Munro, CAS; Re-recording Mixer – Chris Burdon; Re-recording Mixer – Gilbert Lake, CAS; Scoring Mixer – Alan Meyerson, CAS; ADR Mixer – Nick Kray; Foley Mixer – Glen Gathard	Coco – Original Dialogue Mixer – Vince Caro; Re-recording Mixer – Christopher Boyes; Re-recording Mixer – Michael Semanick; Scoring Mixer – Joel Iwataki; Foley Mixer – Blake Collins; Cars 3 – Original Dialogue Mixer – Doc Kane, CAS; Re-recording Mixer – Tom Meyers; Re-recording Mixer – Michael Semanick; Re-recording Mixer – Nathan Nance; Scoring Mixer – David Boucher; Foley Mixer – Blake Collins; Despicable Me 3 – Original Dialogue Mixer – Carlos Sotolongo; Re-recording Mixer – Randy Thom, CAS; Re-recording Mixer – Tim Nielson; Re-recording Mixer – Brandon Proctor; Scoring Mixer – Greg Hayes; Foley Mixer – Scott Curtis; Ferdinand – Original Dialogue Mixer – Bill Higley, CAS; Re-recording Mixer – Randy Thom, CAS; Re-recording Mixer – Lora Hirschberg; Re-recording Mixer – Leff Lefferts; Scoring Mixer – Shawn Murphy; Foley Mixer – Scott Curtis; The Lego Batman Movie – Original Dialogue Mixer – Jason Oliver; Re-recording Mixer – Michael Semanick; Re-recording Mixer – Gregg Landaker; Re-recording Mixer – Wayne Pashley; Scoring Mixer – Stephen Lipson; Foley Mixer – Lisa Simpson
Outstanding Achievement in Sound Mixing for a Motion Picture – Documentary	Outstanding Achievement in Sound Mixing for a Television Movie or Mini-Series
Jane – Production Mixer – Lee Smith; Re-recording Mixer – David E. Fluhr, CAS; Re-recording Mixer – Warren Shaw; Scoring Mixer – Derek Lee; ADR Mixer – Chris Navarro, CAS; Foley Mixer – Ryan Maguire; An Inconvenient Sequel: Truth to Power – Production Mixer – Gabriel Monts; Re-recording Mixer – Kent Sparling; Re-recording Mixer – Gary Rizzo, CAS; Re-recording Mixer – Zach Martin; Scoring Mixer – Jeff Beal; Foley Mixer – Jason Butler; Eric Clapton: Life in 12 Bars – Re-recording Mixer – Tim Cavagin; Re-recording Mixer – William Miller; ADR Mixer – Adam Mendez, CAS; Gaga: Five Foot Two – Re-recording Mixer – Jonathan Wales, CAS; Re-recording Mixer – Jason Dotts; Long Strange Trip – Production Mixer – David Silberberg; Re-recording Mixer – Bob Chefalas; Re-recording Mixer – Jacob Ribicoff	Black Mirror: USS Callister – Production Mixer – John Rodda, CAS; Re-recording Mixer – Tim Cavagin; Re-recording Mixer – Dafydd Archard; Re-recording Mixer – Will Miller; ADR Mixer – Nick Baldock; Foley Mixer – Sophia Hardman; Big Little Lies – "You Get What You Need" – Production Mixer – Brendan Beebe, CAS; Re-recording Mixer – Gavin Fernandes, CAS; Re-recording Mixer – Louis Gignac; Fargo – "The Narrow Escape Problem" – Production Mixer – Michael Playfair, CAS; Re-recording Mixer – Kirk Lynds, CAS; Re-recording Mixer – Martin Lee; Scoring Mixer – Michael Perfitt; Sherlock: The Lying Detective – Production Mixer –John Mooney, CAS; Re-recording Mixer – Howard Bargroff; Scoring Mixer – Nick Wollage; ADR Mixer – Peter Gleaves, CAS; Foley Mixer – Jamie Talbutt; Twin Peaks – "Part 8" – Production Mixer – Douglas Axtell; Re-recording Mixer – Dean Hurley; Re-recording Mixer – Ron Eng
Outstanding Achievement in Sound Mixing for Television Series – One Hour	Outstanding Achievement in Sound Mixing for Television Series – Half Hour
Game of Thrones – "Beyond the Wall" – Production Mixer – Ronan Hill, CAS; Production Mixer – Richard Dyer, CAS; Re-recording Mixer – Onnalee Blank, CAS; Re-recording Mixer – Mathew Waters, CAS; Foley Mixer – Brett Voss, CAS; Better Call Saul – "Lantern" – Production Mixer – Phillip W. Palmer, CAS; Re-recording Mixer – Larry B. Benjamin, CAS; Re-recording Mixer – Kevin Valentine; ADR Mixer – Matt Hovland; Foley Mixer – David Michael Torres, CAS; The Crown – "Misadventure" – Production Mixer – Chris Ashworth; Re-recording Mixer – Lee Walpole; Re-recording Mixer – Stuart Hilliker; Re-recording Mixer – Martin Jensen; ADR Mixer – Rory de Carteret; Foley Mixer – Philip Clements; The Handmaid's Tale – "Offred" – Production Mixer – John J. Thomson, CAS; Re-recording Mixer – Lou Solakofski|; Re-recording Mixer – Joe Morrow; Foley Mixer – Don White; Stranger Things – "Chapter Eight: The Mind Flayer" – Production Mixer – Michael P. Clark, CAS; Re-recording Mixer – Joe Barnett; Re-recording Mixer – Adam Jenkins; ADR Mixer – Bill Higley, CAS; Foley Mixer – Anthony Zeller, CAS	Silicon Valley – "Hooli-Con" – Production Mixer – Benjamin A. Patrick, CAS; Re-recording Mixer – Elmo Ponsdomenech; Re-recording Mixer – Todd Beckett; Ballers – "Yay Area" – Production Mixer – Scott Harber, CAS; Re-recording Mixer – Richard Weingart, CAS; Re-recording Mixer – Michael Colomby, CAS; Re-recording Mixer – Mitch Dorf; Black-ish – "Juneteenth, The Musical" – Production Mixer – Tom N. Stasinis, CAS; Re-recording Mixer – Peter J. Nusbaum, CAS; Re-recording Mixer – Whitney Purple; Modern Family – "Lake Life" – Production Mixer – Stephen A. Tibbo, CAS; Re-recording Mixer – Dean Okrand, CAS; Re-recording Mixer – Brian R. Harman, CAS; Veep – "Omaha" – Production Mixer – William MacPherson, CAS; Re-recording Mixer – John W. Cook II, CAS; Re-recording Mixer – Bill Freesh, CAS
Outstanding Achievement in Sound Mixing for Television Non Fiction, Variety or Music – Series or Specials
Rolling Stone: Stories from the Edge – Production Mixer – David Hocs; Production Mixer – Tom Tierney; Re-Recording Mixer – Tom Fleischman, CAS; American Experience: The Great War – "Part 3" – Production Mixer – John Jenkins; Re-Recording Mixer – Ken Hahn; Anthony Bourdain: Parts Unknown – "Oman" – Re-Recording Mixer – Benny Mouthon, CAS; Deadliest Catch – "Last Damn Arctic Storm" – Re-Recording Mixer – John Warrin; Who Killed Tupac? – "Murder in Vegas" – Production Mixer – Steve Birchmeier; Re-Recording Mixer – John Reese
