= Milanka Brooks =

English actress

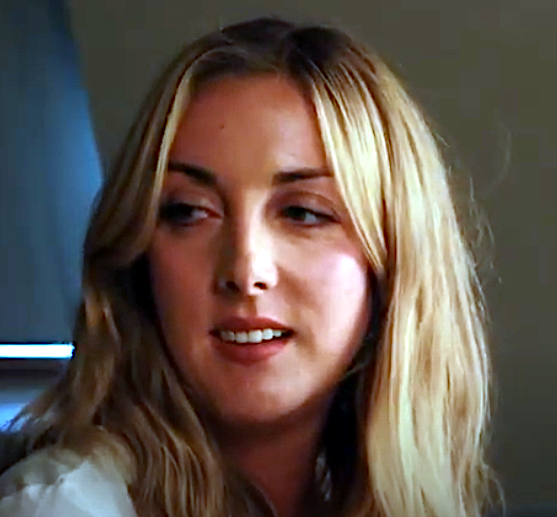
- Milanka Brooks in 2018, picture from comedy sketch with Nicôle Lecky
- Born: 12 September 1983 (age 42); London, England
- Occupation: Actress
- Years active: 2009–present

Milanka Brooks (born 12 September 1983) is an English actress, known for her roles as Ionela for two seasons of Benidorm (2015–2016), Elena Tulaska in the Black Mirror episode "USS Callister" (2017) and its 2025 sequel episode, and as Princess Svetlana in the Channel 4 British royal family parody The Windsors in 2020.

== Education ==
Milanka Brooks was born in London, England, on 12 September 1983, to her mother Mileva Brooks, who was a model, and father Harry Brooks Jr., an actor/writer. Brooks graduated from The Drama Centre London, Class of 2008/2009.

== Career ==
Brooks first appeared on screen in 2009 in two French films: Spy(ies) and King Guillaume. Her first appearance on British television was in 2011, and was in her role as Francesca in series 11 of the BBC TV sitcom My Family. In 2012, Brooks appeared as a model in episode 1 of Joanna Lumley's TV comedy series Little Crackers, and as Elena in the BBC comedy Boomers in 2014.

From 2015 to 2016, Brooks in the seventh and eighth series of ITV's Benidorm, portraying Ionela the fiancée of Geoff Maltby, who was played by Johnny Vegas. Brooks appeared as Svetlana in the Catherine Tate television film Do Not Disturb in 2016.

In 2017, Brooks portrayed a TV presenter in the SyndicateRoom funded film Gun Shy alongside Antonio Banderas. In December 2017 she appeared as the blue-skinned Elena Tulaska in "USS Callister", the first episode of series 4 of Black Mirror alongside Jesse Plemons. Milanka also appeared in the Disney feature film Patrick in 2018.

In 2019, Brooks had a role in the ITV drama Cleaning Up, and starred as Stasia in episode 3 of Four Weddings and a Funeral alongside Andie MacDowell and Jamie Demetriou in 2019. In 2020, she portrayed the role of Princess Svetlana in the series 3 episode 4 of the Channel 4 British royal family parody The Windsors.

In 2025, she returned to her role as blue-skinned Elena Tulaska in series 7 of Charlie Brooker's Black Mirror, in the episode: "USS Callister: Into Infinity".

== Filmography ==
=== Film ===
| Year | Title | Role |
|---|---|---|
| 2009 | King Guillaume | La traductrice |
| 2009 | Espion(s) | La vendeuse |
| 2011 | Diagnosis Superstar | Secretary |
| 2015 | Sonja's World-Inside Out | Sonja's Niece |
| 2015 | Draw on Sweet Night | Lady Arbella Stuart |
| 2015 | Billy the Kid | Mrs. Gill |
| 2016 | Do Not Disturb | Svetlana |
| 2017 | Gun Shy | TV Presenter |
| 2018 | Patrick | Suzanne |
| 2018 | Coulda Woulda Shoulda | Airline Rep |

=== Television ===
| Year | Title | Role | Notes |
|---|---|---|---|
| 2011 | My Family | Francesca | 2 episodes |
| 2012 | Little Crackers | Model | 1 episode |
| 2013 | The Intern | Laura | 1 episode |
| 2014 | Boomers | Elena | 1 episode |
| 2015, 2016 | Benidorm | Ionela | Series 7 and 8 |
| 2015 | Boy Meets Girl | Barwomen | 1 episode |
| 2017 | Black Mirror | Elena Tulaska | Series 4 Episode: "USS Callister" |
| 2018 | Nutritiously Nicola | Date 1 | 2 episodes |
| 2019 | Cleaning Up | Daniela | 2 episodes |
| 2019 | Four Weddings and a Funeral | Stasia | Episode 3 - We Broke |
| 2020 | The Windsors | Princess Svetlana | Series 3 - episode 4 |
| 2025 | Black Mirror | Elena Tulaska | Series 7 Episode: "USS Callister: Into Infinity" |

=== Podcast ===
| Year | Title | Role | Notes |
|---|---|---|---|
| 2023 | Doctor Who: The Ninth Doctor Adventures | Phil (voice) | Series 2 - episode 11 - "The Blooming Voice" |
