= USS Callister =

- Black Mirror episode
- Promotional poster released as part of the "13 Days of Black Mirror"
- Episode no.: Series 4 Episode 1
- Directed by: Toby Haynes
- Written by: William Bridges; Charlie Brooker
- Cinematography by: Stephan Pehrsson
- Editing by: Selina Macarthur
- Original release date: 29 December 2017
- Running time: 76 minutes

Guest appearances
- Jesse Plemons as Robert Daly; Cristin Milioti as Nanette Cole / Lt. Cole; Jimmi Simpson as James Walton / Lt. Walton; Michaela Coel as Shania Lowry / Communications Officer Lowry; Billy Magnussen as Karl Plowman / Valdack; Milanka Brooks as Elena Tulaska / Crew Member Tulaska; Osy Ikhile as Nate Packer / Helmsman Packer; Paul G. Raymond as Kabir Dudani / Diagnostics Officer Dudani; Hammed Animashaun as Pizza Guy; Tom Mulheron as Tommy Walton; Aaron Paul as Gamer691 (voice)

Episode chronology
← Previous "Hated in the Nation"	Next → "Arkangel"

"USS Callister" is the first episode of the fourth series of the anthology programme Black Mirror. Written by series creator Charlie Brooker and William Bridges and directed by Toby Haynes, it first aired on Netflix, along with the rest of season four, on 29 December 2017.

The episode follows Robert Daly (Jesse Plemons), a reclusive but gifted programmer and co-founder of a popular immersive virtual reality-based massively multiplayer online game who is bitter over the lack of recognition of his position from his coworkers. He takes out his frustrations by simulating a Star Trek–like space adventure within the game, using his coworkers' DNA to create sentient digital clones of them. Acting as the captain of the USS Callister starship, Daly is able to order his co-workers around, bend them to his will, and mistreat them if they get out of line. When Daly brings newly hired Nanette Cole (Cristin Milioti) into his game, she encourages the other clones to revolt against Daly.

In contrast to most Black Mirror episodes, "USS Callister" contains overt comedy, and it has many special effects. As a fan of Star Trek, Bridges was keen to introduce many details from the show into "USS Callister", though the episode was conceived mostly with The Twilight Zone's 1961 episode "It's a Good Life" and the Viz character Playtime Fontayne in mind. The episode's reception was overwhelmingly positive, with reviewers praising the allusions to Star Trek, the acting, and the cinematography. Some critics saw the episode as being about male abuse of authority, and compared Daly to contemporary events surrounding internet bullies and sexual abuse committed by Harvey Weinstein. In 2018, the episode won four Primetime Emmy Awards, including Outstanding Television Movie and Outstanding Writing for a Limited Series, Movie, or Dramatic Special, and was nominated for three other Emmy Awards. A sequel episode, titled "USS Callister : Into Infinity", was released as part of the seventh series of Black Mirror, making it the only episode to receive a sequel.

== Plot ==
Aboard the spaceship USS Callister, Captain Robert Daly (Jesse Plemons) and his crew destroy their arch-enemy Valdack's (Billy Magnussen) ship, but he escapes. The crew celebrates, with Daly kissing both female crewmates.

The real-life version of Daly is CTO at Callister Inc. The company was co-founded by Daly and James Walton (Jimmi Simpson), the company's CEO, which produces the immersive virtual reality-based massively multiplayer online game Infinity, in which users control a starship in a simulated reality. Daly is treated poorly by his fellow employees, who appear identical to Captain Daly's crewmates.

New programmer Nanette Cole (Cristin Milioti) praises Daly's work on Infinity, but the more assertive Walton interrupts to show her around the office. When Daly returns home, he opens a development build of Infinity which is modded to resemble his favourite television show Space Fleet. As Captain Daly, he berates the crewmates, strangling a subservient "Lieutenant" Walton.

After employee Shania Lowry (Michaela Coel) warns Nanette to beware of Daly, he takes a discarded coffee cup of Nanette's and uses her DNA to replicate her consciousness within his development build. As "Lieutenant Cole", Nanette finds herself aboard the USS Callister, where "Lieutenant" Lowry explains that they are digital clones of Callister Inc. staff members. Confused and distraught, Nanette attempts to escape the ship but is teleported back to the bridge. She refuses to obey Daly's commands, so he removes her facial features, suffocating her, until she relents.

The crew embark on a mission in which they apprehend Valdack but spare his life. Valdack, really a clone of Daly’s coworker Karl, begs Daly to kill him, but Daly mockingly refuses, stating that killing is against Space Fleet code. After Daly leaves, Nanette finds a way to send a game invitation containing a message for help to the real-world Nanette. When the real-world Nanette asks the real-world Daly about the message, he dismisses it as spam. Daly enters the game to interrogate his crew and transforms Lowry into a monster when she defends Nanette. Once Daly departs, Nanette identifies a distant wormhole as an uplink to Infinity's next update; she surmises that by flying into the wormhole, they will be deleted and therefore die. Walton is very hesitant to help; he explains that Daly has previously recreated his son Tommy within the game and killed him in front of Walton as punishment. He also points out that since Daly still has all their DNA, he can continue to recreate and torture them. Nanette promises the crew that they will recover the lollipop containing Tommy's DNA.

When Daly returns, Nanette persuades him to take her on a mission to Skillane IV alone. She strips to her bathing suit and runs into a nearby lake, enticing a reluctant Daly to swim with her. He leaves behind the omnicorder, which allows him to control the game, on the shore. The crew teleports the omnicorder onto their ship and uses it to access sexually explicit images of Nanette on her PhotoCloud account, which they then use to blackmail the real-life Nanette into ordering a pizza at Daly's apartment and stealing his DNA samples while he answers the door. The cloned crew then teleport digital Nanette onto the ship.

As Daly resumes play, he discovers the crew are escaping. He commandeers a crashed spaceship to pursue them through an asteroid belt. The Callister collides with an asteroid; Walton repairs the thrusters manually, incinerating himself, and the ship accelerates into the wormhole. The firewall detects Daly's modded build and locks his controls, rendering him physically unable to exit the game as it is deleted around him. In the real world, Daly is left sitting motionless, implying he has died from the side effect.

The crew reawakens in the un-modded version of Infinity with Karl and Lowry restored to human form. Now free, they continue their adventure, with Nanette leading them, after interacting with an annoyed user, "Gamer691" (Aaron Paul).

== Production ==
Whilst series one and two of Black Mirror were shown on Channel 4 in the UK, Netflix commissioned the series for 12 episodes (split into two series of six episodes) in September 2015 with a bid of $40 million, and in March 2016, Netflix outbid Channel 4 for the right to distribute the series in the UK. The six episodes in series four were released on Netflix simultaneously on 29 December 2017. "USS Callister" is listed as the first episode, though as each episode is standalone the episodes can be watched in any order.

=== Conception and writing ===
Sometimes ideas come about where we say, "What haven't we done yet," and we said, "We haven't done space, and what's a 'Black Mirror' version of a space epic?"

— Charlie Brooker, interview with Variety

The episode was written in November 2016 by series creator Charlie Brooker along with William Bridges, who previously co-wrote series 3 episode "Shut Up and Dance". Brooker said that the episode was based around doing "a 'Black Mirror' version of a space epic", an idea that began during the filming of series three episode "Playtest". Inspired partially by "It's a Good Life", a 1961 episode of The Twilight Zone about a boy with "God-like powers", and partially by Viz character Playtime Fontayne, an adult who makes people participate in childish games, Charlie Brooker compares Daly to dictator Kim Jong-un and to "someone going online and venting". Brooker said that they also at times called the episode an "adult Toy Story", making the comparison between the toys in Andy's room having to hold still until Andy leaves, and the virtual crew having to hold back their true thoughts until Daly left the simulation. Though sometimes very bleak, the episode has comedy that may be considered atypical for the show, and Brooker thinks it is the most mainstream episode of the show. Additionally, Brooker compares it to series 3 episode "San Junipero" in that both were "a conscious decision to expand what the show was and then upend it."

As a big fan of Star Trek, Bridges suggested many elements from it that are incorporated in the episode, as well as borrowed concepts from the film Galaxy Quest, which involved normal people suddenly pulled into an inescapable science fiction setting. Brooker tells Den of Geek that the episode is not intended as an attack on Star Trek, a show that was "wildly ahead of its time". Originally, Daly's character was more unlikeable from the episode's beginning, but this was changed so that Daly strangling Walton would be more of a surprise. Brooker states that Daly dies of starvation after the events in the episode, due to the "Do Not Disturb" sign he puts on his door. Haynes considered ending the episode with the shot of Daly in his apartment, rather than the happier scene of the crew playing Infinity, but Brooker reassured him that not every Black Mirror episode had to end unhappily.

In the episode's initial draft, every character had a "Grain" implanted in them—a device that recorded their vision and hearing, similar to what was featured in the series one episode "The Entire History of You". This explained why virtual Nanette had the memories of real-life Nanette. Brooker decided that showing the Grain contents alongside Daly getting each person's DNA was too much detail, which led to the Grain aspect being cut. Shania says "It's a fucking gizmo" in response to a question from Nanette about how Daly's technology works, as a way to comment that the technology not making sense did not matter.

=== Casting ===
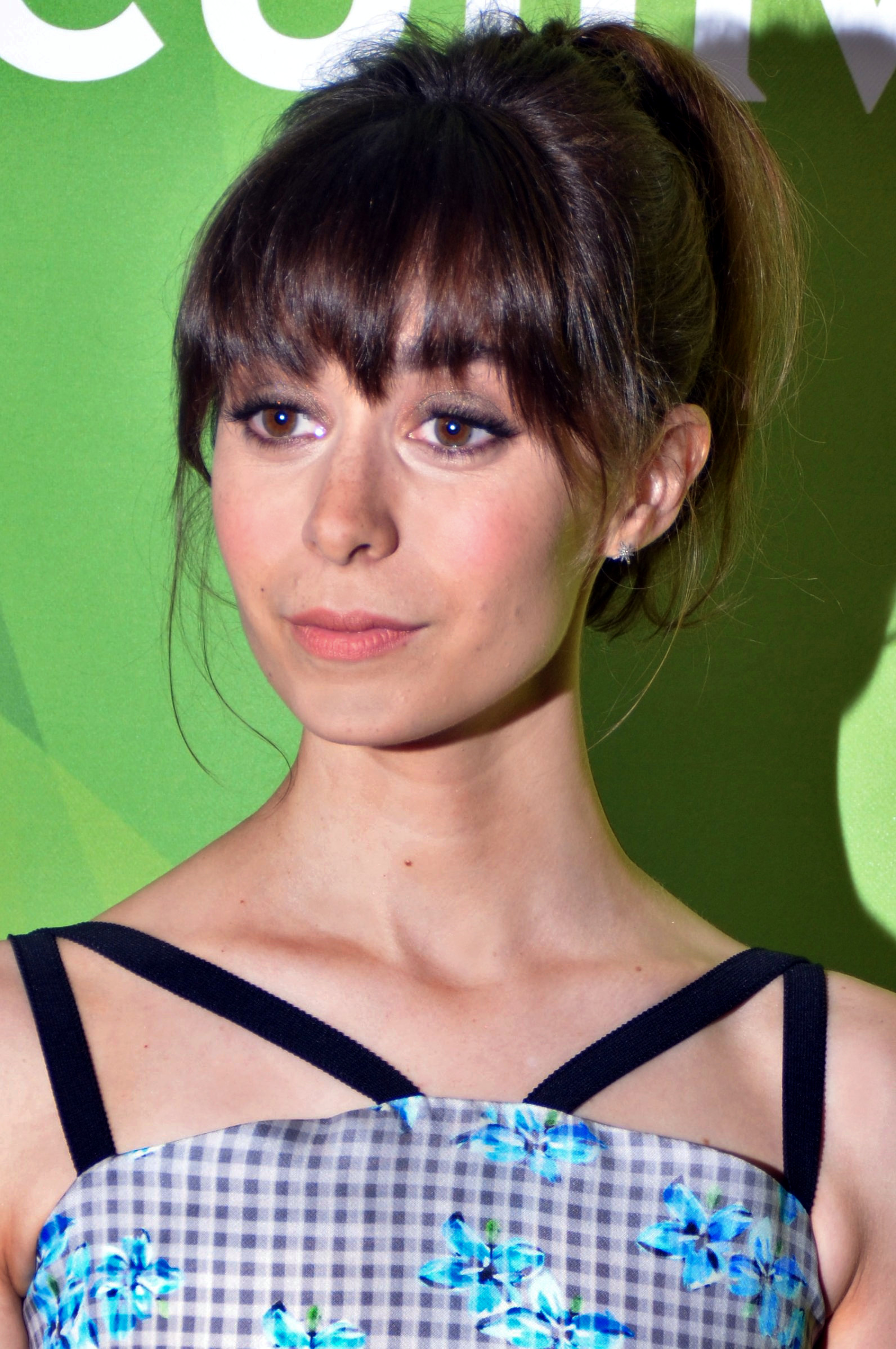
Cristin Milioti stars in the episode as Nanette Cole, who Milioti describes as a "woman in charge [fighting] against a small-minded, misogynist bully".

"USS Callister" stars Jesse Plemons as Captain Daly and Cristin Milioti as Lieutenant Nanette, both previous stars of Fargo. Director Toby Haynes notes that "they always wanted Jesse Plemons for the role of Daly", and that the filming dates and other cast were based around him. Milioti accepted the role having only seen a few pages of the script; she said in an interview that Nanette is "a woman in charge [fighting] against a small-minded, misogynist bully". Jimmi Simpson, formerly known from Westworld, and Michaela Coel of Chewing Gum are also main characters in the episode; Coel had appeared in the previous Black Mirror episode "Nosedive" as an airport worker. Simpson was ill with the flu during filming but noted that his character was intended to be skinny. The episode's main cast is rounded out by Billy Magnussen, Milanka Brooks, Osy Ikhile, and Paul G. Raymond.

Aaron Paul makes a vocal cameo appearance at the end of the episode, whilst Plemons' fiancée Kirsten Dunst makes an uncredited appearance in the office background early on, after asking the director while on set. The director had to ask for the single shot she was in to be re-added after the continuity department edited it out. Paul's character "Gamer691" was initially supposed to be a "geeky kid", but Brooker believed that the perception of video gamers as creepy was wrong, and "he felt like it was talking down to the audience" as he is a gamer himself. He then came up with the idea that the best voice would be Paul's character Jesse Pinkman from Breaking Bad, a show that featured Plemons in the role of Todd Alquist.

The production approached Paul, who was a fan of Black Mirror and had already auditioned for a different episode but withdrew due to commitments with Welcome Home. Paul accepted the part on the condition that his appearance in this episode did not preclude him from being part of another Black Mirror episode. He later starred in the space-themed series six episode "Beyond the Sea". The part was one of the last elements of the episode to be finished, and it surprised members of the cast when it was screened.

=== Filming ===
Director Toby Haynes has previously worked on Sherlock and Doctor Who, and crew from Star Wars and 2014 film Guardians of the Galaxy were hired. Filming began in January 2017 and ran for twenty days. The episode was mostly shot in the U.K., with roughly three days of filming in the Canary Islands for interplanetary scenes. The scenes set on the Callister ship, Daly's apartment, and the Callister offices were shot at Twickenham Studios, with all of the office scenes shot within three days. Most scenes had to be done in two or three takes, with some scenes such as Walton's description of Tommy being filmed in one take. Haynes and Milioti both commented on the tight schedule, with Haynes feeling that the pressure helped everyone to rise to the challenge. Brooker notes that the growth of the Me Too movement meant the episode felt more timely.

The crew could not copy set elements directly from Star Trek without fear of legal action, but instead detailed the set in the same fashion as Star Trek or Battlestar Galactica. The episode also presents Space Fleet following a similar history as Star Trek, first as a 4:3 aspect ratio to represent its original broadcast format of the original series, then to detailed widescreen version, and finally ending on a redesigned starship and costumes that reflect the J. J. Abrams-helmed reboot. Inspired by the style of 1960s television, the episode used Dutch angles during the spaceship scenes. Cinematography towards the end was designed to evoke Star Trek. Haynes was a fan of Star Trek, and helped to add details, such as putting Lowry in a red uniform since she was the first to be killed off. A number of Star Wars references are also included.

The spaceship initially uses orange and red colours, and the special effects were made to look like those from the 1960s; a modern version of the ship is shown at the end of the episode, more similar to the 2009 Star Trek reboot. To help the viewer distinguish between scenes set in the game and those set in the real world, Haynes had the scenes set in the game use mounted camera shots, while the real-world scenes used handheld camera techniques; in the scene where Daly interrupts the game to get a delivered pizza, the camera started off mounted and then switched to handheld to show the collision of those two techniques. Characters aboard the USS Callister wore neoprene costumes, designed to create an artificial Barbie look for the women. Daly looks like a Ken doll, with his costume making him appear more muscular. Milioti aimed to change her posture and mannerisms slightly between Nanette in the real world and the virtual world. Plemons watched Star Trek and worked with a vocal coach to pay homage to William Shatner's performance as Captain Kirk.

To avoid building an entire spaceship, most scenes on board the ship were set on the bridge or in corridors; a canteen area was considered but not used. The scene where Nanette wakes up on the ship was initially going to use a medical bay, but Haynes wanted to use a circular room. The storyboard design for Lowry being turned into a monster had to be adapted during filming so the viewers could see her sprouting extra legs and tentacles. For the two planets visited in the episode, the script described one as an Indiana Jones–style cave and the other as a jungle planet, but budget limitations and the filming date of February affected the choices made. The scene in which Nanette tricks Daly into swimming with her was filmed at a crater-like structure in Lanzarote, using red sand from a nearby quarry, and at a lake with black sand. A drone was used to film an aerial shot of the set. Both actors improvised much of the scene.

Production companies Painting Practice and Revolver worked on graphics and the user interfaces in the spaceship, whilst special effects were done by Framestore. Brooker says the episode features more special effects than any previous episode of the show. The Arachnajax monsters were designed to be a mixture of scary and comedic, with features like their ability to shrug making them more human-like. The first cut of the episode, according to the cinematographer Stephan Pehrsson, was 90 to 95 minutes, but scenes were removed to reach the final runtime of 76 minutes.

=== Music ===
British composer Daniel Pemberton composed the episode's score. A fan of Black Mirror, Pemberton had worked with Brooker before on a video game magazine in the 1990s. Pemberton was between compositions for Molly's Game and All the Money in the World, but despite being busy he accepted the job for "USS Callister". Pemberton says the score consisted of three styles: the Space Fleet music, the real world and Daly's video game. He also describes the soundtrack as "almost like two film scores that slowly collide". Pemberton wrote a score with elements reminiscent of Star Trek, and other "synthetic and modern" aspects, and some of the music was inspired by Jerry Goldsmith. A 70-piece orchestra from Prague was used. The soundtrack was released on Amazon Music on 29 December 2017. A vinyl version of the soundtrack, featuring as its cover the Butcher Billy-designed Space Fleet poster seen on the episode, was released on Record Store Day 2019.

=== Marketing ===
External videos
- Black Mirror – U.S.S. Callister; The trailer for "USS Callister".
- Black Mirror – Featurette: U.S.S. Callister; Brief commentary by Charlie Brooker and Jesse Plemons.

In May 2017, a Reddit post unofficially announced the names and directors of the six episodes in series 4 of Black Mirror. The first trailer for the series was released by Netflix on 25 August 2017, and contained the six episode titles. In September 2017, two photos from the fourth season were released, including one from "USS Callister".

Beginning on 24 November 2017, Netflix published a series of posters and trailers for the fourth series of the show, referred to as the "13 Days of Black Mirror". The art for "USS Callister" was released on 4 December, and the trailer on 5 December. The following day, Netflix published a trailer featuring an amalgamation of scenes from the fourth series, which announced that the series would be released on 29 December. Prior to the series' release, "USS Callister" was described as the "most anticipated new episode" by one source; it was compared by Charlie Brooker to "San Junipero", the most successful episode of the previous series.

== Analysis ==
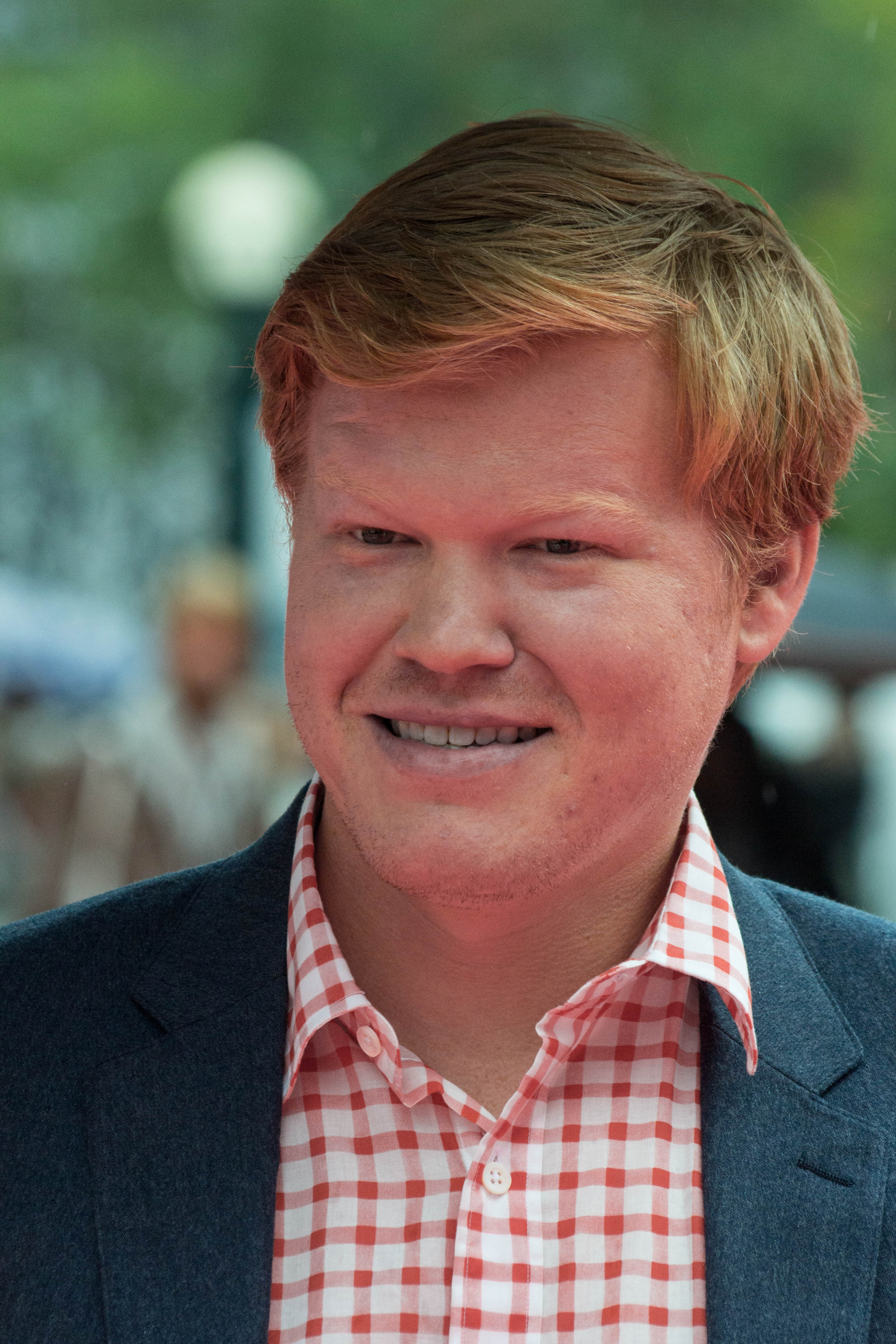
Jesse Plemons plays Robert Daly, who takes his anger out on virtual clones due to unhappiness in real life.

The episode is an homage to Star Trek. Using a similar set design to Star Trek, the episode has been compared to another parody of the show, the 1999 film Galaxy Quest. One reviewer described "USS Callister" as critical of sexism in Star Trek and its fandom, with another calling it "a cruel parody and even a misandrous attack", though Brooker says that "I don't want it to be seen that we're attacking fans of classic sci-fi". It has a similar storyline to short story "I Have No Mouth, and I Must Scream", which features characters held hostage and tortured by a supercomputer. Additionally, it evokes Toy Story. The procedurally generated game Infinity in the episode is considered to be inspired by No Man's Sky, a video game released in August 2016. Brooker commented in October 2016 that "there's an idea for the second [Netflix] season that's sprung from a procedurally-generated universe" while playing the game.

"USS Callister" has been called "the most cinematic episode to date" for the show, due to its use of vivid colours and a huge fictional landscape. Though the episode is dark at times and raises serious issues, it also has a perkier tone than previous Black Mirror episodes, containing one-line jokes and visual gags, and a happy ending relative to other episodes of the show. Its plot twist is revealed slowly, a contrast to the "gut-punch" reveal of previous episodes.

Main character Robert Daly has an unhappy life, where he does not receive credit for co-founding his company and is mocked by workplace colleagues. Traditionally, Daly would be the underdog character, and the story might focus on his getting revenge on Walton for stealing his credit, and for his colleagues' mistreatment of him. The classic plotline of a socially awkward man meeting a younger woman who appreciates his intelligence is utilised when Daly meets Nanette. As a result, viewers initially side with Daly, but instead of the pair falling in love, Daly's true nature is unmasked early. As the Captain of USS Callister, he abuses his position of power, forcing his crewmates to act as opposites of themselves, such as Walton going from Daly's superior to his underling. Similar to an internet bully, Daly does not seem to care about the pain he is inflicting on the virtual clones, treating them as action figures.

Critic Alec Bojalad stated that Daly fits an archetype of white males who participate in prejudiced online echo chambers due to social ostracisation in real life and a sense of entitlement. Charles Bramesco considered Daly characteristic of the nerd who assumes the role of the bully after himself being bullied. Dana Schwartz linked this to the "modern toxic masculinity" movements of Gamergate and the alt-right. Likewise, Sonia Saraiya of Vanity Fair called Daly an "incel king" exhibiting "a tired, stubborn form of masculinity clinging to control" with an entitlement to women compared to Nanette's feminist fight for her own autonomy.

Charles Bramesco of Vulture noted that despite the fact that Daly never actually rapes any of the female members of the crew, he exhibits psychological traits associated with rape culture. Tristram Fane Saunders of The Telegraph called the episode "a sharp attack on an entire genre of male-driven narrative" and equates Daly's sexist fantasy involving his attractive younger co-worker with the Harvey Weinstein sexual abuse allegations. Sara Moniuszko of USA Today made the same comparison, linking how Daly kisses female crew members and threatens the crew when they disobey him to Weinstein's alleged abuse. Brooker noted that coincidentally, news of allegations against Weinstein first broke when Brooker was on his way to a premiere of the episode in New York. Female crew members are dressed in sexualised outfits in Daly's game, but wear more realistic outfits when they escape.

Joho called Walton "arguably the true hero of the story", for sacrificing himself to fix the ship at the climax of the episode. However, Jimmi Simpson—who played Walton—disagreed, noting that his character's thoughtlessness and selfishness were the original provocation for Daly to take revenge. Simpson opined that Walton's motive for sacrificing himself is not redemption but to "make it right for the people". Walton is absent from the ship once the characters make it into the online Infinity game; it can be interpreted that his code was deleted from Daly's modded game. However, Simpson believed that his character remains alive, continually tortured from the pain of the incinerators.

"USS Callister" features references to previous episodes of Black Mirror. In addition to Brooker's remark that the episode is in some ways a successor to the third-series episode "San Junipero," the neural implant used in this episode to transport users into the Infinity game bears the logo "TCKR", the company that developed the technology featured in that episode, the implication being that Callister Inc. uses the same software for their own games. A reference to the second-series episode "White Bear" is found in the names of two planets visited by the crew of Daly's virtual spaceship; the planets Skillane IV and Rannoch have been named for the criminal couple of Victoria Skillane and Iain Rannoch.

The episode has also been analysed as an on-screen rewriting of the myth of Don Quixote in the digital age, re-interpreting the figure of the Don as a monomaniacal gamer obsessed with space opera in a way comparable to the hidalgo's obsession with chivalric romances. According to an article by Miguel Sebastián-Martín, published in Science Fiction Film and Television, "USS Callister" "updates the myth for a satire of the male gamer/geek/nerd stereotype, who is reimagined as a quixotic embodiment of neoliberal, patriarchal individualism in the digital realm."

== Reception ==
"USS Callister" received critical acclaim, with several reviewers considering it the best episode of series four. On Rotten Tomatoes, 95% of 38 reviews are positive, with an average rating of 9.3 out of 10. It received a four-star rating in The Telegraph and Den of Geek, an A rating in IndieWire, and an A− rating in The A.V. Club. Cross called the episode "surely one of Black Mirror's best". Saunders thought that the male abuse of power is "prescient" and "topical", while Bojalad wrote that the episode's timing is "just right". However, Dileo criticised the episode as "possibly not the deepest or most insightful" of the programme, and Oller wrote that the episode's "mixed metaphors" cause positive aspects to be "drowned out".

The episode's parody of Star Trek has been widely praised, with Statt calling it an "unabashed love letter to Star Trek", while Franich described it as a "knowing parody" and "loving hyperbolization". Cross believes it has a "love for the source material". Statt also praised the episode's references to other media such as No Man's Sky. However, it has also received criticism. Lambie wrote that allusions to Star Trek "aren't all that new", while Saunders believed that the numerous references "clobber you over the head". Oller called them "heavy-handed", believing they overshadow the episode's message. In a negative review, Whitley opined that although the episode has the right number of references, they are used in a "cruel parody and even a misandrous attack on male science-fiction fans".

"USS Callister" is more comedic than previous episodes of Black Mirror and explores a genre which is new for the show, both of which were well received. Statt described it as "laugh-out-loud funny"; Sims called it "darkly funny"; and, in a negative review, Oller wrote that the "comedy is far better than the actual story". Stolworthy calls the genre change "heaps of fun", while Statt called it "refreshingly different". Starkey described the episode as proof that the show has room to grow.

The ending and DNA cloning technology have both been highlighted by critics, garnering mixed reception. Saunders said the episode's ending "might not feel very Black Mirror" but is "the kind of story it would be good to hear more often". Starkey described the ending as "wonderfully bleak", while Sims praised the happy ending. However, Handlen called it "sudden" and "rushed", believing that the episode is "a little too eager to please", which causes it to lose tension. Oller lambasted the episode for numerous plot holes and its "sprawling sci-fi rules and nonsense" such as the DNA cloning plot device. VanDerWerff similarly criticised the cloning technology's lack of explanation; Handlen called it "magic that you either go with or you don't".

Other parts of the plot have also received mixed reception. Starkey believed the "early plot jumps" are "slightly heavy-handed". Sims praised the twist which reveals that Daly is not the protagonist. Lambie opined that the flashback with Walton's son adds a "chill running through the middle of the episode", but VanDerWerff criticised that it unnecessarily adds length to the episode. VanDerWerff compared the crew's escape plan favourably to a "movie prison break", though Franich believed that the fast pace causes the "dull" blackmail of Nanette to be "a too-easy gag". Stolworthy said the length of the episode is justified, though Starkey wrote that the episode "occasionally meanders", and Sims concurred that the episode is "a mite too long".

The cast of the episode have been widely praised. Saunders wrote that Plemons is "obviously perfect" as Daly, and he was praised by Lambie, Miller and Franich for his acting of Daly's two different personalities. VanDerWerff wrote that Plemons "blends a surprisingly great William Shatner riff with a slow-building sense of odiousness". Miller called the character "truly grounded in reality" due to the writing and acting. Simpson's performance as Walton is singled out by Stolworthy and Bojalad for praise, with Starkey describing him as the episode's "emotional centerpiece". Bojalad called Milioti's character Nanette the "real revelation" of the episode, while Cross stated that she was "painfully easy" to relate to. Darren Franich of Entertainment Weekly called for Milioti to receive an Emmy nomination for Best Actress for her performance as Nanette in the episode. Stolworthy wrote that Coel's performance as Lowry stands out. However, VanDerWerff criticised that the episode's minor characters are "mostly quick sketches".

"USS Callister" has been described as the show's "most cinematic episode to date", and the episode with "by far the highest production values". Bojalad praised the "bright, beautiful pastel color", while Dileo noted the "jaw-dropping special effects". Statt called the episode "visually stunning", concluding it is "the first episode of Black Mirror that feels like it belongs in a movie theater". Franich wrote that the cinematography "captures the effect" of the original Star Trek.

=== Episode rankings ===
"USS Callister" is mostly in the top half on critics' lists of the 19 episodes of Black Mirror by quality:

- 1st – Steve Greene, Hanh Nguyen and Liz Shannon Miller, IndieWire
- 1st – Travis Clark, Business Insider
- 2nd – Charles Bramesco, Vulture
- 3rd – James Hibberd, Entertainment Weekly
- 6th – Matt Donnelly and Tim Molloy, TheWrap
- 7th – Aubrey Page, Collider
- 7th – Corey Atad, Esquire
- 8th – Morgan Jeffery, Digital Spy
- 13th – Eric Anthony Glover, Entertainment Tonight

Proma Khosla of Mashable reviewed each of the 22 episodes by tone, ranking "USS Callister" as 5th least pessimistic.

Other critics compared the six episodes of series four in isolation, with "USS Callister" placing as follows:

- 2nd (grade: A−) – TVLine
- 4th – Christopher Hooton, Jacob Stolworthy, The Independent

=== Awards ===
"USS Callister" was nominated for several awards in 2018:

Year	Award	Category	Recipients	Result	Ref.
2018	Art Directors Guild Awards	Television Movie or Limited Series	Joel Collins	Won	
2018	Costume Designers Guild Awards	Excellence in Fantasy Television Series	Maja Meschede	Nominated	
2018	Golden Reel Awards	Outstanding Achievement in Sound Editing — Episodic Long Form – Dialogue/ADR	Kenny Clark, Michael Maroussas	Won	
2018	Golden Reel Awards	Outstanding Achievement in Sound Editing — Episodic Long Form – Effects/Foley	Kenny Clark	Nominated	
2018	Cinema Audio Society Awards	Outstanding Achievement in Sound Mixing for a Television Movie or Mini-Series	John Rodda, Tim Cavagin, Dafydd Archard, Will Miller, Nick Baldock and Sophia Hardman	Won	
2018	BAFTA Television Craft Awards	Sound: Fiction	John Rodda, Tim Cavagin, Kenny Clark, Michael Maroussas	Nominated	
2018	BAFTA Television Craft Awards	Photography & Lighting: Fiction	Stephan Pehrsson	Nominated	
2018	BAFTA Television Craft Awards	Production Design	Joel Collins, Phil Sims	Nominated	
2018	BAFTA Television Awards	Best Supporting Actor	Jimmi Simpson	Nominated	
2018	Saturn Awards	Best Guest Performance in a Television Series	Jesse Plemons	Nominated	
2018	MTV Movie & TV Awards	Most Frightened Performance	Cristin Milioti	Nominated	
2018	Hugo Award	Best Dramatic Presentation, Short Form	William Bridges, Charlie Brooker and Toby Haynes	Nominated	
2018	Primetime Emmy Award	Outstanding Cinematography for a Limited Series or Movie	Stephan Pehrsson	Nominated	
2018	Primetime Emmy Award	Outstanding Lead Actor in a Limited Series or Movie	Jesse Plemons	Nominated	
2018	Primetime Emmy Award	Outstanding Music Composition for a Limited Series, Movie or Special (Original Dramatic Score)	Daniel Pemberton	Nominated	
2018	Primetime Emmy Award	Outstanding Single-Camera Picture Editing for a Limited Series or Movie	Selina MacArthur	Won	
2018	Primetime Emmy Award	Outstanding Sound Editing for a Limited Series, Movie or Special	Kenny Clark, Michael Maroussas, Dario Swarde, Ricky Butt and Oliver Ferris	Won	
2018	Primetime Emmy Award	Outstanding Television Movie	Annabel Jones, Charlie Brooker and Louise Sutton	Won	
2018	Primetime Emmy Award	Outstanding Writing for a Limited Series, Movie or Dramatic Special	William Bridges and Charlie Brooker	Won	
2018	RTS Television Awards	Best Single Drama	"USS Callister"	Nominated	

== Sequel ==
After its release, Brooker and Jones said "USS Callister" would be the episode most suited to a sequel. Brooker said the final scene leaves the characters "in a universe of infinite possibilities" with "a lot of question marks". Haynes suggested it would work as a television series and that he would be interested in working on it. He speculated that Daly was left in a coma and his attempted murder would be investigated. The series was about to enter development in 2023 when it was derailed by the 2023 SAG-AFTRA strike, and the ideas pitched for the series were reworked into a single television film.

In March 2024, Netflix announced that a sequel, titled "USS Callister : Into Infinity", would air as part of the seventh series in 2025, marking the first Black Mirror story to receive a continuation. Alongside a 30-second announcement trailer, a spokesperson said: "Robert Daly is dead, but for the crew of the USS Callister, their problems are just beginning". With a runtime of 88 minutes, it is the second longest Black Mirror episode after "Hated in the Nation".

== See also ==
- Digital immortality
- Mind uploading
- Posthuman
