= USS Callister: Into Infinity =

- Black Mirror episode
- Promotional poster
- Episode no.: Series 7 Episode 6
- Directed by: Toby Haynes
- Written by: Charlie Brooker; Bisha K. Ali; William Bridges; Bekka Bowling
- Cinematography by: Stephan Pehrsson
- Editing by: Tony Kearns
- Original air date: 10 April 2025
- Running time: 90 minutes

Guest appearances
- Cristin Milioti as Nanette Cole / Captain Cole; Jimmi Simpson as James Walton / Lt. Walton; Billy Magnussen as Karl Plowman / Valdack; Osy Ikhile as Nate Packer / Helmsman Packer; Milanka Brooks as Elena Tulaska / Crew Member Tulaska; Paul G. Raymond as Kabir Dudani / Diagnostics Officer Dudani; Jesse Plemons as Robert Daly; Gwion Glyn as Mohawk; Helder Fernandes as Space Cowboy; Ebenezer Gyau as Ninja; Bilal Hasna as Kris El Masry; Iolanthe as Pixie Bunkin; Rita Estevanovich as Doctor Garcia; Dan Middleton as DanTDM (uncredited); Thomas Simons as TommyInnit (uncredited)

Episode chronology
| ← Previous "Eulogy" | Next → — |

"USS Callister : Into Infinity" is the sixth and final episode in the seventh season of the British science fiction anthology television series Black Mirror and also the sequel to the fourth season episode "USS Callister". Several of the cast of USS Callister return to reprise their roles, including Cristin Milioti, Jimmi Simpson, Billy Magnussen, Milanka Brooks, Osy Ikhile, and Paul G. Raymond, while Jesse Plemons portrays a digital clone version of Robert Daly. Written by series creator and showrunner Charlie Brooker, Bisha K. Ali, William Bridges, and Bekka Bowling, and directed by Toby Haynes, it premiered on Netflix on 10 April 2025, with the rest of series seven. The episode received positive reviews.

== Plot ==
Three months after the events of "USS Callister", the digitally cloned crew of real people, led by Captain Nanette, have been surviving in the Infinity game universe by robbing players. Due to not having gamer tags, players think they are cheaters or glitches and complain about them on the game's forum. After an encounter that nearly kills them, Nanette concludes that they need to access the game's source code to send themselves into a private server to ensure long term survival. To do so, they need to get back Lt. Walton who had died in a previous event.

In the real world, an investigative reporter questions Callister Inc. CEO James Walton about the players without gamer tags and Robert Daly's use of an illegal DNA cloning device. Nanette Cole, the real-life counterpart of Captain Nanette, spies on the interview. She offers to help Walton look into the rogue players. After investigation, she concludes the rogue players are cloned co-workers.

Both the crew and Nanette are able to locate the planet that Lt. Walton is on. Nanette and Walton enter the game at the same time Captain Nanette enters the planet. The two groups encounter each other, retrieve Lt. Walton, and reboard the USS Callister. While Captain Nanette explains the situation to Nanette and Walton, Walton shoots the clones, killing clone Karl Plowman. Captain Nanette kills Walton, temporarily disconnecting him, and orders Nanette to stop him from respawning. Nanette disconnects herself and attempts to prevent Walton from re-entering. After fleeing the building, pursued by Walton, Nanette is suddenly hit by a car, leaving her in a coma.

Lt. Walton explains the truth behind the "Heart of Infinity": to procedurally generate planets for the game, Walton used the illegal DNA cloning device to create a clone of Daly in the Heart, forcing him to update and expand Infinity indefinitely, in isolation. The crew travels to the Heart and Captain Nanette teleports inside it. Inside, she meets the Daly clone, who is willing to help the crew after she explains the situation. He then shows her he has access to Nanette's body in the hospital via cerebral implant. He offers a choice: he can merge her consciousness with Nanette's to revive her and allow her to re-enter the real world, but doing so would erase the crew, or he can create a private server for the crew. After Captain Nanette chooses the latter, Daly says she passed his test and he can actually do both options, and starts to copy and paste her. However, she realizes this would leave a copy of herself to be Daly's companion, and demands he cut and paste instead. Infuriated that she plans on leaving him to be alone again, Daly's clone attacks her.

Meanwhile, Walton enters the game and ambushes his digital clone, knocking him out in his quarters and posing as Lt. Walton. Too late, the crew realise he is an imposter, and he sends out an invite to all the players the crew had robbed before exiting the game. The crew struggles to defend themselves from scores of angry players.

Captain Nanette manages to kill Daly's clone, and his death triggers a dead man's switch that slowly deletes the game. She manages to run the cut and paste right before the game is destroyed, and wakes up in the hospital in control of the real Nanette. Confoundingly, she finds she is co-inhabited by the Callister crew, who can experience the real world through her senses and communicate with her via cell phone.

Walton finds that the whole of Infinity and all backups have been wiped from the server. Three months later, he is arrested by the FBI on numerous charges. Nanette and the crew inside her watch the news, and, when they complain about their predicament, she assures them she is working on a solution. Reluctantly, she plays the latest episode of The Real Housewives of Atlanta, allowing them to watch through her eyes.

== Production ==
The episode is a sequel to the Black Mirror episode "USS Callister". Director Toby Haynes returned to direct the episode. Originally, Brooker and Haynes planned to develop the sequel to "USS Callister" as a series, which was about to enter development in 2023 when the plans were derailed by the 2023 SAG-AFTRA strike. The ideas for the series were then reworked into a single television film.

While most of the returning cast from "USS Callister" was announced prior to the release of the episode, Brooker kept Jesse Plemons's return as a clone of Robert Daly a secret. Michaela Coel, another actor from "USS Callister", had schedule conflicts and did not return for this episode. Her character was reported as being killed during an earlier mission.

== Reception ==
Reviews were mostly positive. Alec Bojalad of Den of Geek rated the episode 4.5 out of 5 stars.

=== Episode rankings ===
"USS Callister: Into Infinity" ranked below average on critics' lists of the 34 installments of Black Mirror, from best to worst:

- 11th – Jackie Strause and James Hibberd, The Hollywood Reporter
- 18th – Lucy Ford, Jack King and Brit Dawson, GQ
- 18th – Ed Power, The Daily Telegraph
- 20th – James Hibbs, Radio Times
- 25th – Charles Bramesco, Vulture
- 31st – James Hibberd, Christian Holub, and Randall Colburn, Entertainment Weekly

IndieWire listed the 33 episodes, excluding Bandersnatch, where "USS Callister: Into Infinity" placed 16th. Wired rated it the best of the six episodes in series seven. Instead of by quality, Mashable ranked the episodes by tone, concluding that "USS Callister: Into Infinity" was the ninth-least pessimistic episode of the show.
