= Eulogy (Black Mirror) =

- Black Mirror episode
- Promotional poster
- Episode no.: Series 7 Episode 5
- Directed by: Chris Barrett; Luke Taylor
- Written by: Charlie Brooker; Ella Road
- Cinematography by: Álvaro Gutiérrez
- Editing by: Selina Macarthur
- Original air date: 10 April 2025
- Running time: 47 minutes

Guest appearances
- Paul Giamatti as Phillip Connarty; Patsy Ferran as The Guide / Kelly Royce; Declan Mason as Young Philip Connarty; Hazel Monaghan as Young Carol Hartman Royce

Episode chronology
← Previous "Plaything"	Next → "USS Callister: Into Infinity"

"Eulogy" is the fifth episode in the seventh series of the British science fiction anthology television series Black Mirror. Written by Ella Road and series creator and showrunner Charlie Brooker and directed by Chris Barrett and Luke Taylor, it premiered on Netflix on 10 April 2025, with the rest of season seven.

In the episode, a lonely man revisits his memories and photographs of an old girlfriend who has recently died, in order to send his memories of her to her family. Through the experience, he learns more about her and the relationship. The episode has received critical acclaim, with many reviewers calling it the best episode of series 7, and one of the best Black Mirror episodes.

== Plot ==
Technology company Eulogy informs an American man named Phillip (Paul Giamatti) that his ex-girlfriend Carol, who he has not seen in decades, has died. Eulogy requests Phillip's contribution via his memories through photos he took to help Carol's family create a memorial. Initially hesitant, he agrees to contribute and is sent a kit, after which he is walked through the process by The Guide (Patsy Ferran). Via the kit's technology, he is able to virtually enter a photo and explore the location. All of Phillip's photos are unusable as he had defaced Carol in them following their breakup, in addition to destroying the letters she had written.

Phillip and The Guide nevertheless explore the photos, which reveal that his relationship with Carol was strained, especially when she temporarily moved to London to play the cello in a West End production. Calling Phillip on his birthday, she learned that he had been unfaithful when his colleague answered the phone. Months later, Phillip attempted to apologize by flying to London and surprising Carol with a marriage proposal at a fancy restaurant, but she left the restaurant. The Guide reveals herself as a digital avatar of Carol's daughter Kelly, the result of a one-night stand Carol had after learning of Phillip's infidelity, and informs him that Carol was pregnant when he proposed to her.

Phillip has an epiphany and discovers a disposable camera he bought on the London trip. There is only one picture, that of the hotel room that he had trashed after she walked out from dinner. He finds a folded letter from Carol but is unable to pick it up and read it as it is part of the photo. He later finds it among other literature from the trip. In the letter, Carol admitted to Phillip her infidelity and her pregnancy but revealed that she still loved Phillip and wanted him back. He weeps as he realises he missed an opportunity to reconcile.

A distraught Phillip searches through his desk to find and play a cassette recording of a piece Carol wrote, and is finally able to remember her face by revisiting a photo of him standing in a hallway, watching her happily play the piece on her cello. He later attends her funeral in London, walking in as Kelly plays Carol's piece on the cello during the ceremony. She nods at him.

== Production ==
Brooker and Road were inspired by the docuseries The Beatles: Get Back which utilized technology to make video and audio of the Beatles more lively.

== Reception ==
The episode received mostly positive reviews. Alec Bojalad of Den of Geek rated the episode a perfect 5 out of 5 stars.

=== Episode rankings ===
"Eulogy" ranked average on critics' lists of the 34 installments of Black Mirror, from best to worst:

- 3rd – Lucy Ford, Jack King and Brit Dawson, GQ
- 8th – Jackie Strause and James Hibberd, The Hollywood Reporter
- 12th – Charles Bramesco, Vulture
- 18th – James Hibbs, Radio Times
- 23rd – James Hibberd, Christian Holub, and Randall Colburn, Entertainment Weekly
- 32nd – Ed Power, The Daily Telegraph

IndieWire listed the 33 episodes, excluding Bandersnatch, where "Eulogy" placed 18th. Wired rated it second-best of the six episodes in series seven. Instead of by quality, Mashable ranked the episodes by tone, concluding that "Eulogy" was the eleventh-least pessimistic episode of the show.
