= Loch Henry =

- Black Mirror episode
- Promotional poster
- Episode no.: Series 6 Episode 2
- Directed by: Sam Miller
- Written by: Charlie Brooker
- Cinematography by: David Raedeker
- Editing by: Mark Davies
- Original air date: 15 June 2023
- Running time: 54 minutes

Guest appearances
- Samuel Blenkin as Davis McCardle; Myha'la Herrold as Pia Koreshi; Daniel Portman as Stuart King; John Hannah as Richard King; Monica Dolan as Janet McCardle; Gregor Firth as Kenneth McCardle; Ellie White as Kate Cezar; Tom Crowhurst as Iain Adair

Episode chronology
← Previous "Joan Is Awful"	Next → "Beyond the Sea"

"Loch Henry" is the second episode of the sixth series of the anthology series Black Mirror. It was written by the series creator Charlie Brooker and directed by Sam Miller. Alongside the rest of the sixth series, it premiered on Netflix on 15 June 2023. The episode follows Davis (Samuel Blenkin) and Pia (Myha'la Herrold) as they make a true crime documentary in Davis's run-down hometown in Scotland.

Brooker reflected on the cinematic style of true crime documentaries and how he and his wife had considered traveling to Scotland after seeing its depiction in a documentary. "Loch Henry" was the first episode set in Scotland, as the setting of "Crocodile" was changed to Iceland; 18 locations in Scotland were used for filming. The episode criticises the effects of true crime media on victims and highlights dissonant attitudes of the creators and consumers of true crime media. The episode references other Black Mirror events through newspapers and other text; its themes were compared to "Joan Is Awful", which is also about streaming television.

The episode placed around the middle of critics' lists of Black Mirror installments by quality, though most reviews aggregated by Rotten Tomatoes were positive. Reviewers wrote negatively of the episode's moral but positively about the characters and acting. Critics were ambivalent towards the plot twist.

== Plot ==
Davis McCardle (Samuel Blenkin) visits his childhood home in Loch Henry, Scotland, with his American girlfriend Pia Koreshi (Myha'la Herrold). They met in a film course and are pursuing Davis's idea for a documentary about an amateur conservationist in Rùm who prevents illegal egg collecting. Davis's mother Janet (Monica Dolan) cooks for them, but she and Pia are uneasy around each other.

Davis introduces Pia to his friend Stuart King (Daniel Portman), who runs the only remaining pub in Loch Henry, the Lochside Inn. Stuart's father Richard (John Hannah) is an alcoholic. The former tourist haven is run down because, in the 1990s, resident Iain Adair (Tom Crowhurst) made national headlines as a serial killer. Davis's policeman father Kenneth (Gregor Firth) was called to Adair's home after Adair made drunken comments about missing tourists. Adair shot his parents, Kenneth, and himself. Wounded in the shoulder, Kenneth acquired MRSA in hospital and died when Davis was eight.

Pia proposes a true crime documentary about Adair. Davis is worried about its local impact, but Stuart believes the film will bring in tourism, and Janet is happy to voice her anger about Adair's responsibility for Kenneth's death. They pitch it to the producer Kate Cezar (Ellie White), who wants new information uncovered. Davis, Pia and Stuart break into Adair's abandoned home and find evidence of torture in the basement. They film footage with an old camera, taping over Janet's Bergerac VHS cassettes. Returning home, they get in a car accident. Davis has to stay overnight in hospital, where Richard—recovering from a fall down the stairs—voices opposition to the documentary.

Pia discovers that Janet's cassettes contain recordings of Janet and Kenneth alongside Adair, torturing his victims. Pia flees the house, unable to get phone service. Janet realises what Pia has discovered and pursues her. Pia hits her head while fleeing through a stream in darkness and dies. Janet returns to the house, leaves a note next to evidence of her crimes, and hangs herself.

Davis assists on a Streamberry documentary about his parents' criminal activity. An interview shows that Richard suspected Janet and Kenneth's involvement after unnerving sexual activity with the couple. Kenneth killed the Adair family and wounded himself so it appeared that Iain worked alone.

Stuart is delighted as tourists fill the Lochside Inn and the series wins a BAFTA award that Cezar dedicates to Davis. After the awards ceremony, Davis returns unhappily to his hotel room and re-reads his mother's suicide note: "For your film. Mum."

== Production ==
Black Mirror went on hiatus after its fifth series was released in 2019. Its executive producers, Charlie Brooker and Annabel Jones, departed from the production company House of Tomorrow and joined Broke and Bones, leading to negotiations for production rights. During this time, Brooker took a break from Black Mirror and worked on more comedic projects. In May 2022, Netflix announced that a sixth Black Mirror series was in development. Broke and Bones produced the series, while House of Tomorrow's parent company, Banijay, retained ownership.

"Loch Henry" is the second episode of the sixth series, which was released on 15 June 2023. As Black Mirror is an anthology, each instalment can be watched in any order. It was written by the series creator Charlie Brooker. He said the episode was about turning "horrible things" into "a sumptuous form of entertainment". Historical technology is key to the episode, such as the VHS recordings of Bergerac (1981–1991). Brooker remarked that the "texture of old media" had become fetishised.

Brooker was inspired by true crime documentaries, noticing how the genre's increasingly cinematic and art house style gave an air of being "somber, serious" and "important". He believed this masked its perverse, "rubbernecking" nature. He and his wife Konnie Huq had thought about holidaying in Scotland after seeing landscape footage of it in a true crime documentary. He thought the genre used such scenery to fill space due to a lack of crime-related footage.

=== Casting and filming ===
An April 2023 announcement named Samuel Blenkin, Myha'la Herrold, Daniel Portman, John Hannah, and Monica Dolan as cast members in the sixth series. Kirsty Wark presents Blenkins's character with a BAFTA; Weruche Opia also plays herself, at a BAFTA event. The episode was directed by Sam Miller. Herrold and Blenkin said that the episode shows the victims' perspective and puts viewers in Davis's position. Blenkin opined that Davis would struggle to deal with his trauma due to its public nature, and that it could lead him to "become really cynical". Hannah discovered that the episode had more than the "straightforward horror found footage tale" he initially thought it was, as this narrative is deconstructed. Portman said he had "never laughed out loud so much" when first reading a script.

Dolan had previously played true crime roles such as Rose West and Anne Darwin. She also played an unrelated character—a police officer—in the Black Mirror episode "Smithereens". Dolan used a Scottish Highlands accent for Janet that she continued between takes, saying "if you suddenly go into that accent it's a bit like suddenly doing a very strenuous gym exercise without warming up". As she still owned a VHS, her knowledge of its features was useful on set.

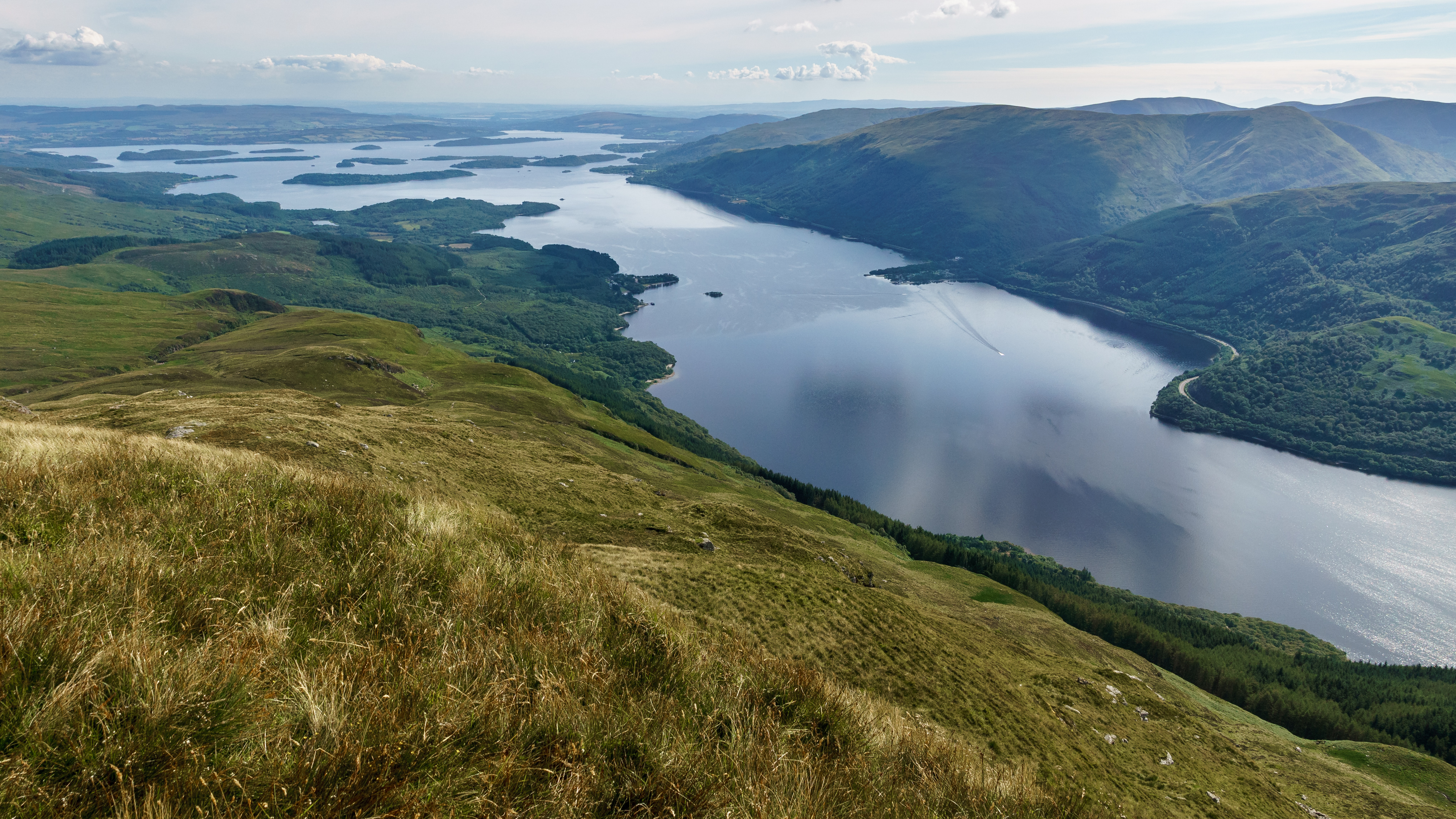
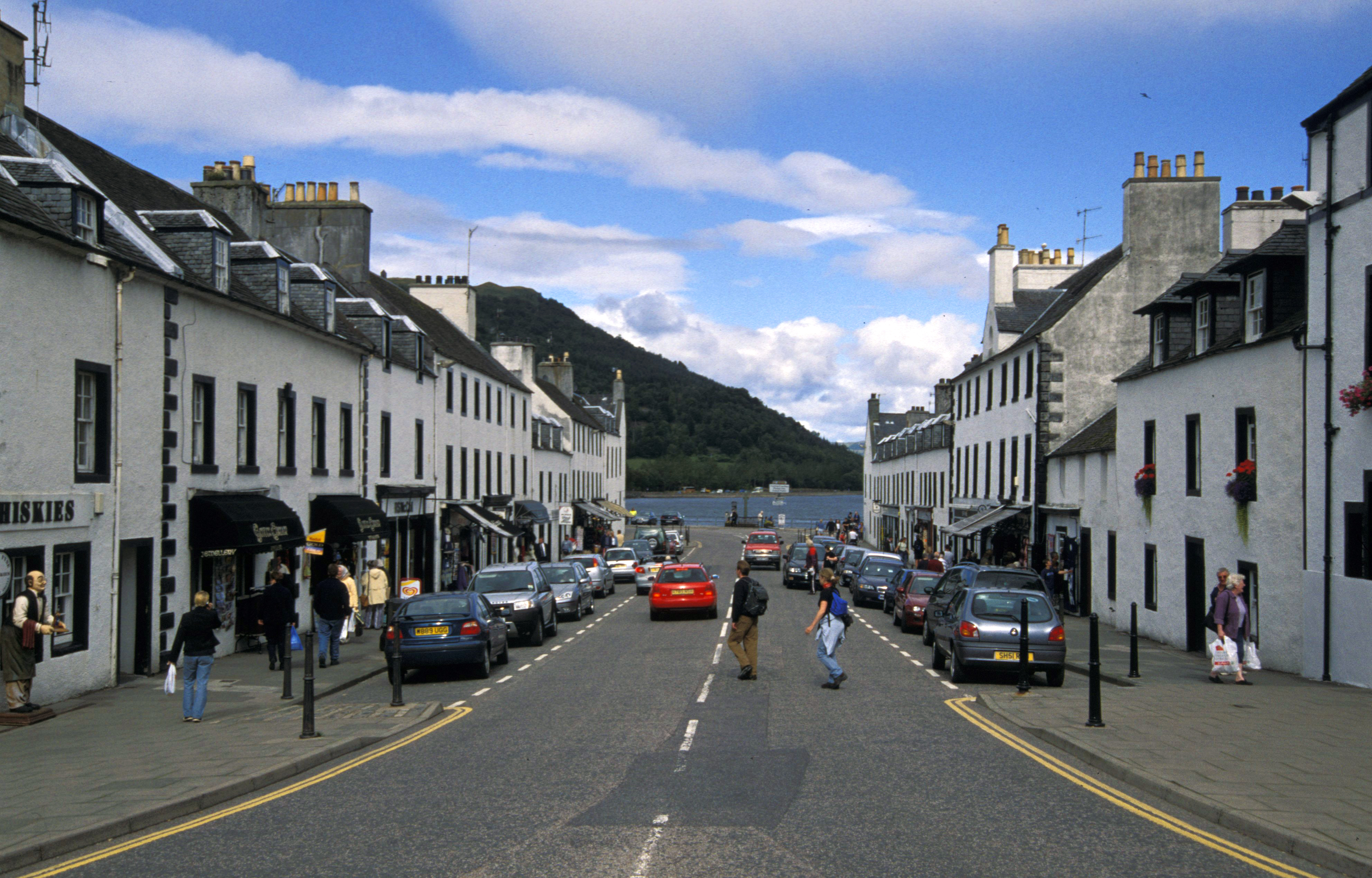
In Scotland, the production crew used Loch Lomond (top) as a base and redesigned Main Street, Inveraray (bottom), for scenes set in the 1990s.

"Loch Henry" is the first Black Mirror episode located in Scotland, though the Iceland-based "Crocodile" was originally set in Scotland. "Loch Henry" was always intended to be set in Scotland; Brooker said it had an "unsentimental strand of humour" that the episode tried to draw on. The crew used Loch Lomond as a base and filmed in 18 locations, which were selected by their Scottish location scout, Liam Irving. Udo Kramer designed sets for all series six episodes. STV News reported in September 2022 that the main street of Inveraray had been adapted for filming with 1990s-style cars, bunting and signs. A scene where Pia falls into a river took place near the Falls of Falloch. Herrold said the "creepy" and "eerie atmosphere" made Pia's escape from Janet a highlight of the filming process, although she had to contend with midges in the water.

The visual effects company NVIZ worked on the montage where Davis and Pia cut a trailer for their documentary, which included adding VHS effects on footage, recreating scanning software and replicating old tabloid newspapers. The episode's soundtrack was composed by Adam Janota Bzowski and released on 21 July 2023.

== Analysis ==
Neil Armstrong of BBC Culture suggested the episode was the most disturbing of the sixth series; critics identified it as a slow-paced mystery fiction with elements of folk horror. The episode critiques true crime; according to i's Emily Baker, it reveals the genre as "pointless" and "empty". Den of Geek's Louisa Mellor wrote that it was rare for Black Mirror to give clear answers to moral questions, but that "Loch Henry" does so in its portrayal of true crime.

Davis, Pia and Stuart speak flippantly about Iain Adair's murders. A montage shows the "tonal dissonance" in their attitudes. The characters get into a car crash because they are distracted by singing a comedy song about Adair torturing his victims. Davis and Stuart are initially excited, "not disgusted or saddened", to tell Pia about the murders, according to Mellor. Pia's death can be seen as retribution for her delight in the unpleasant stories about Adair or for taking advantage of Davis's family tragedy. Like characters in the Blair Witch franchise, which is referenced in dialogue, Davis investigates a story and becomes its subject.

A red masquerade mask worn by Janet in the snuff video that Pia watches is a recurring symbol. Janet is seen putting it on again before hanging herself. Tourists in the Lochside Inn wear similar masks as costumes. The episode ends with a visual of a mask, on the BAFTA award that Davis wins. A similar recurring symbol is a butterfly pin badge worn by murder victim Dawn Challis, which is seen in a keepsake box opened by Janet just before her hanging herself. According to Vulture's Ben Rosenstock, the note that Janet leaves Davis is a "little sign of his mother's love", despite her sadism. Davis has to reinterpret his parents' love in light of their actions. Janet has a collection of Bergerac recordings—according to Marie Claire's Quinci LeGardye, the BBC detective series showcased "inoffensive crimes", making it an apt choice for a mother's favourite series.

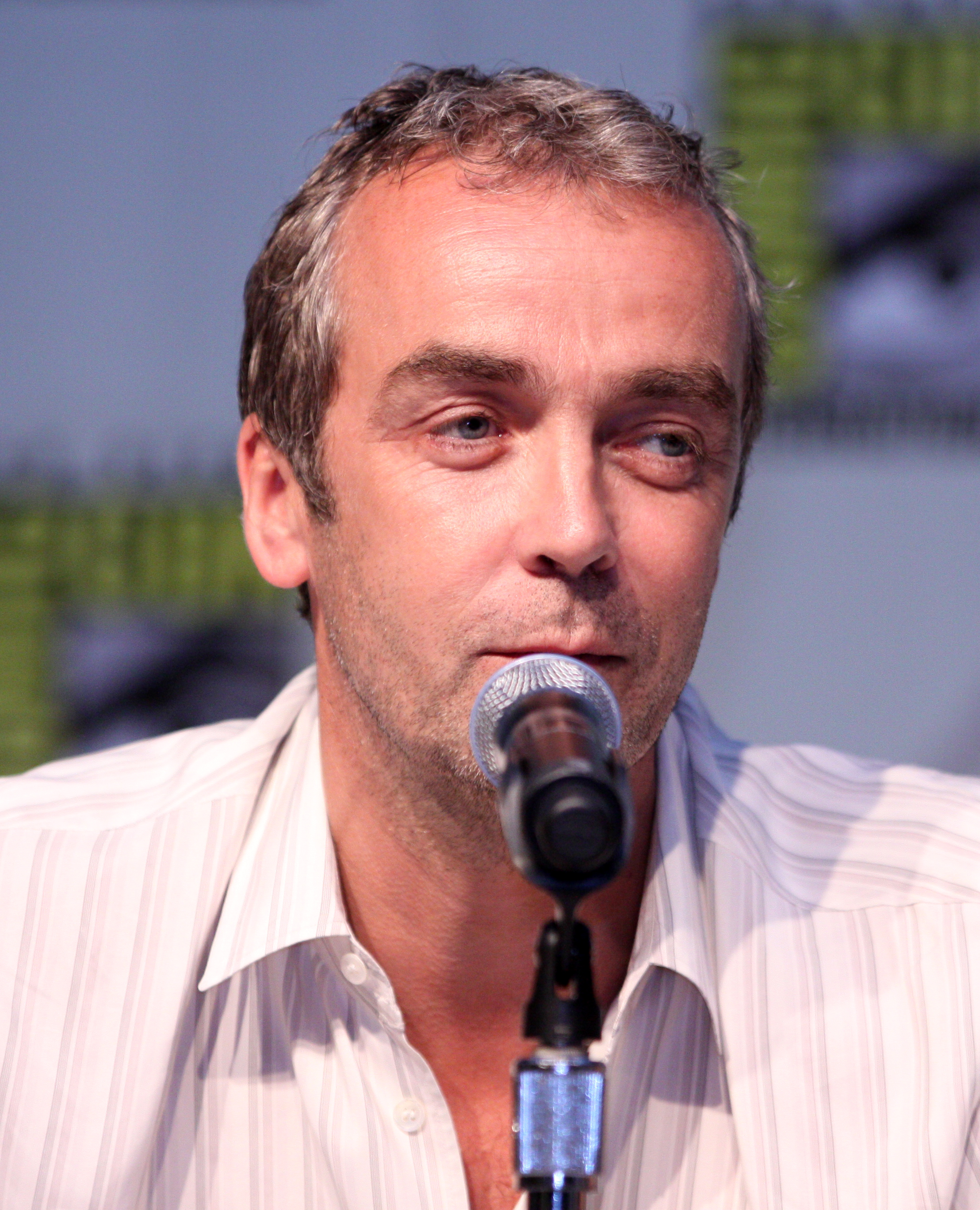
Richard King is played by John Hannah.

Stuart's father Richard King owns the Lochside Inn. He objects to the documentary's creation on the grounds that it is opportunistic. This is a red herring that suggests his involvement; he had additional knowledge but did not take part in criminality. Like the Lochside Inn, Shannon Connellan of Mashable noted, establishments associated with serial killers—the Ten Bells, The Last Resort and L&L Tavern—attract tourism.

Comparisons to other series six episodes were made by critics. Streaming services such as Netflix and the fictional Streamberry—both mentioned in "Loch Henry"—are also the subject of "Joan Is Awful", in which the title character's life is adapted in real-time into a television programme. The documentary Loch Henry: Truth Will Out can be seen on Joan's Streamberry account. "Loch Henry", like "Mazey Day", criticises mass media and sees inquisitive characters led into danger by their profession. Pia is subject to racism, a central theme of "Demon 79". The episode was also seen as thematically similar to series one's "Fifteen Million Merits", which shows commodification and talent show television impacting human empathy.

Additionally, the episode makes Easter egg references to other Black Mirror events through newspapers, news tickers and BAFTA-nominated documentaries. Referenced events include: Michael Smart of "Demon 79" launching his new political party; Cooper of "Playtest" being found dead; auditions for the "Fifteen Million Merits" talent show Hot Shots opening in Australia; and a Waldo sticker on Davis's computer. The two documentaries competing with Davis's Loch Henry production for a Bafta are Suffer the Children: The Tipley Paedophile Ring and Euthanasia: Inside Project Junipero. Tipley is the fictional town from the episode Demon 79, and Project Junipero is in reference to the episode San Junipero. Brooker highlighted as a favourite that Michael Callow of "The National Anthem" is said to run a zoo.

== Reception ==
On the review aggregator Rotten Tomatoes, the episode holds an approval rating of 87% based on 15 reviews. Out of five stars, it was rated four stars by The Daily Telegraph, Vulture and i, 3.5 stars by Den of Geek, and three stars by The Independent. The "delicious sense of impending doom" and "pleasing wicked streak" of the episode were praised by The A.V. Club's Kayleigh Dray and Vanity Fair's Richard Lawson, respectively. Lawson summarised it a "predictable but compelling thriller" that explored the themes of "Joan Is Awful" more successfully. Rosenstock found that it told a "complete, purposeful story" with natural exposition; Alan Sepinwall, writing in Rolling Stone, found it well-paced, except for a rushed ending.

The episode's message received criticism. In The Independent, Nick Hilton summarised it as "vague, underlying commentary on the commercialisation of tragedy". Rachel Dodes of Esquire found it guilty of the "torture porn" that it attempts to criticise; Lawson did not believe its message was original. Adi Robertson wrote for The Verge that it makes "fairly mild observations" about true crime, but fans of the genre already understand its moral issues. She said it failed to explore "the potential ugliness of its premise" or create "characters who transcend it". Connellan was incredulous that Loch Henry would not have attracted true crime tourism before Davis's documentary. She suggested the episode could have further depicted the insensitivity of such tourism.

The plot twist and ending was met with mixed feedback. Despite finding the twist predictable, Paste's Leila Jordan lauded the "great Black Mirror gut punch at the end". In contrast, Robertson believed the "deliberately unsatisfying" conclusion was "rushed" and inferior to the plot twist of "White Bear". Baker was surprised by the twist, but experienced a "frustrating wait" for it. The "sad and empty" conclusion was criticised by Dodes. Rosenstock, in contrast, praised its focus on "psychological implications" for Davis rather than "cultural commentary", making it a "fascinating, haunting ending".

The acting and characterisation was widely praised. Hilton reviewed that the "sterling" cast "bring an increasing sense of unease" to the episode. Rosenstock praised the "nice chemistry" from "Stuart's brashness", "Davis's tentativeness" and "Pia's adventurous attitude", as well as these characters' humour. He found that Pia's greedy side "doesn't go too far" and lauded Herrold's performance of Pia's "horror and disbelief" at the snuff video and "barely concealed fear" in front of Janet. Ed Power, writing in The Daily Telegraph, similarly praised Pia's portrayal as "an outwardly kind person with an inner core that's all ambition" and said Blenkin "shines in the final moments" of the story. For Baker, the episode's highlights were Stuart's "gruff but likeable personality and hilarious quips". However, Robertson critiqued that Davis lacks "a strong enough presence" for his "familial drama" to have emotional impact.

Dolan's role as Janet was also praised. Power found that she "captures the duality of a person with dark depths". Rosenstock said that Dolan manages to give "weird vibes from the beginning" that make sense from a "lonely, grief-stricken widow" but suggest something deeper. Though calling Dolan "excellent", Baker criticised her Scottish accent.

=== Episode rankings ===
"Loch Henry" received middling rankings on critics' lists of the 28 instalments of Black Mirror:

- 7th – Brady Langmann, Esquire
- 12th – Charles Bramesco, Vulture
- 12th – Amit Katwala, Matt Reynolds and James Temperton, Wired
- 15th – Lucy Ford, Jack King and Brit Dawson, GQ
- 15th – James Hibbs, Radio Times
- 16th – Ed Power, The Daily Telegraph
- 16th – James Hibberd and Christian Holub, Entertainment Weekly

IndieWire and GamesRadar+ listed the 27 episodes, excluding Bandersnatch, where "Loch Henry" placed 13th and 25th, respectively. The New York Observer described it as the second-best of the five episodes in series six.
