= Demon 79 =

- Black Mirror episode
- Promotional poster
- Episode no.: Series 6 Episode 5
- Directed by: Toby Haynes
- Written by: Charlie Brooker; Bisha K. Ali
- Cinematography by: Stephan Pehrsson
- Editing by: Matthew Cannings
- Original air date: 15 June 2023
- Running time: 74 minutes

Guest appearances
- Anjana Vasan as Nida Huq; Paapa Essiedu as Gaap / Bobby Farrell; Katherine Rose Morley as Vicky; David Shields as Michael Smart; Nicholas Burns as Keith Holligan; Shaun Dooley as Len Fisher; Emily Fairn as Suzie; Nick Holder as Mr Duncan; Joe Evans as Tim Simons

Episode chronology
← Previous "Mazey Day"	Next → "Common People"

"Demon 79" is the fifth and final episode of the sixth series of the British science fiction anthology series Black Mirror. It was written by series creator Charlie Brooker and Bisha K. Ali, and directed by Toby Haynes. Alongside the rest of the sixth series, it premiered on Netflix on 15 June 2023. It stars Nida (Anjana Vasan), a mild-mannered sales assistant who accidentally releases the demon Gaap (Paapa Essiedu), whom only she can see. Gaap tells her she must commit three murders to prevent the end of the world.

The episode was released under the label Red Mirror, the result of Brooker experimenting with supernatural horror and past settings. It was the first episode written in the sixth series, with which Brooker aimed to rethink the programme's scope. Set in 1979, it shows anti-immigration politics of the Conservative Party and National Front. It was filmed in June 2022 in Harrow, London at The Landmark.

The demon Gaap, initially written as a punk, has a look influenced by Bobby Farrell of Boney M., whose music is used in the soundtrack. The episode draws from horror fiction, fashion and settings of the 1970s. It is unclear throughout the episode whether Nida is imagining her interactions with Gaap. Reviews were positive, with Essiedu's and Vasan's acting widely praised, alongside the episode's comedy. However, it was ranked relatively low on critics' lists of Black Mirror installments by quality.

The episode received seven nominations at the 2024 British Academy Television Awards, winning Best Writing: Drama for Booker and Ali, and Best Photography and Lighting Design: Fiction for Stephan Pehrsson.

== Plot ==
In 1979, Nida Huq (Anjana Vasan) works at the department store Possetts in the English town Tipley. While selling shoes, she fantasises about hurting her xenophobic coworker, Vicky (Katherine Rose Morley), and an unsettling customer, Keith Holligan (Nicholas Burns), who killed his wife.

Nida is alienated by the Conservative, anti-immigration politician Michael Smart, and vandals who paint the fascist National Front symbol on her door. Forced to eat her biryani in the basement after Vicky complains, Nida pricks her finger on a drawer handle and bleeds over a bone talisman.

In her flat, the talisman speaks to Nida, and she releases the demon Gaap (Paapa Essiedu), on his first assignment. Gaap takes the form of Bobby Farrell from Boney M. Nida has three days to make three human sacrifices; failure will lead to world destruction on May Day. Nida refuses to participate, even when Gaap shows her apartment in flames, and flees to a canal. Gaap tells Nida that a passerby, Tim Simons (Joe Evans), molests his eight-year-old daughter. Nida kills Tim with a brick.

Nida vomits with guilt, but, the next day, Gaap is eventually able to convince her to go to work, where he repeatedly points out potential targets for the next sacrifice. That night, she drinks scotch at her local pub, and sees Keith there. She follows him when he leaves, but, before she can attack him, he sees her and invites her to his house for sex. Nida bludgeons Keith with a hammer, and also kills his brother Chris, who comes home and surprises her. Gaap calls a demonic technical support line and is told that Keith's death does not count, as he was a murderer, so one sacrifice remains.

Smart, whom Nida's boss supports, visits Possetts and wins Vicky's vote. At Nida's urging, Gaap shows her Smart's future: one day, he will become Prime Minister in an upset victory as leader of the ultra-nationalist Britannia Party. Though demons are fans of Smart, and Gaap urges her to choose someone else, Nida insists on targeting him for the final sacrifice.

Police officer Len Fisher (Shaun Dooley) begins to investigate Tim's murder, and then that of the Holligan brothers. He interviews Nida after the publican and barmaid mention her strange behavior, and she says that, though she does not usually drink, she lies that the previous day was the anniversary of her deceased mother's birthday. Fisher is suspicious when she says she does not know Keith, as he found paperwork with her signature from Keith's visit to Possetts, so he follows Nida's car when she leaves to tail Smart after a speech. She rams Smart's car, causing him to crash, and attacks him with a hammer, but Len approaches and convinces her to drop the weapon.

At the police station, Nida tells the disbelieving officers about Gaap and the talisman. Midnight passes without incident, but, minutes later, sirens blare, and nuclear warfare breaks out. As the atomic shockwave approaches, Nida agrees to join Gaap—who is outcast after failing his initiation—in an eternal void.

== Cast ==
- Anjana Vasan as Nida Huq
- Paapa Essiedu as Gaap
- Katherine Rose Morley as Vicky
- David Shields as Michael Smart
- Nicholas Burns as Keith Holligan
- Shaun Dooley as Len Fisher
- Emily Fairn as Suzie
- Nick Holder as Mr Duncan
- Joe Evans as Tim Simons
- Hayley Considine as Jean Simons
- Joshua James as Chris Holligan
- Steve Garti as Landlord
- Vicky Binns as Julie the Barmaid
- Jonny Cordingley as Rod
- Joe Hughes as Husband
- Bethan Nash as Wife
- Janie Booth as Sweet Gran
- Joseph Aumeer as Demon Gaap
- Lillie Mae Law as Laura Simons

== Production ==
Black Mirror went on hiatus after its fifth series was released in 2019. Its executive producers, Charlie Brooker and Annabel Jones, departed from the production company House of Tomorrow and joined Broke and Bones, leading to negotiations for production rights. During this time, Brooker took a break from Black Mirror and worked on projects that were more comedic. In May 2022, Netflix announced that a sixth Black Mirror series was in development. Broke and Bones produced the series, while House of Tomorrow's parent company, Banijay, retained ownership.

"Demon 79" is the last of the five episodes in series six, though it was the first to be written. The series was released on 15 June 2023. As Black Mirror is an anthology, each instalment can be watched in any order. The episode was written by Brooker and Bisha K. Ali. Ali is the only co-writer of the sixth series; she created the series Ms. Marvel (2022). Ali also received a credit as executive producer of the series six episode "Joan Is Awful".

Brooker noted that, since Black Mirror's 2011 debut, dystopian sci-fi with technological themes had gone from rare to common, so he aimed to write horror fiction and period dramas. He conceived of "Demon 79" as the first episode of a companion retro-themed horror anthology series called Red Mirror. The episode's supernatural elements are designed to evoke 1970s horror movies. According to Brooker, more episodes could be made under the Red Mirror label depending on the success of "Demon 79".

The episode was instead included in series six of Black Mirror, which Brooker described as a "conscious decision to slightly upend what the show is". Its title sequence reads, Black Mirror Presents: A Red Mirror Film. This allowed Brooker to find a different perspective for the series and dispel the idea that the series is saying "tech is bad" rather than "people are fucked up". Inspired by "Demon 79", other episodes in the series are set in the past: "Beyond the Sea" was changed from a near-future story to one in 1969 and "Mazey Day" is set in the mid-2000s.

=== Casting and filming ===
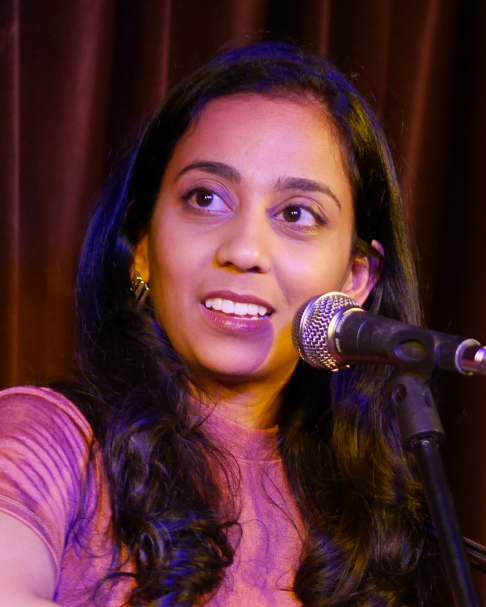
Anjana Vasan stars in the episode as Nida.

First reports in July 2022 revealed the casting of Paapa Essiedu and Anjana Vasan, with additional cast members Katherine Rose Morley and David Shields revealed in May 2023. Nicholas Burns, who plays Keith Holligan, starred in Nathan Barley (2005), which was co-created by Charlie Brooker. Vasan is one of the few actors to appear in multiple Black Mirror episodes; she had a small role in "Nosedive", wearing silver paint and credited as "Space Cop" and made a cameo as a gamer in series 7 episode "USS Callister: Into Infinity". Her other roles include Amina in We Are Lady Parts (2021–) and Stella in A Streetcar Named Desire, characters that are underestimated, like Nida.

"Demon 79" was the second episode directed by Toby Haynes, after "USS Callister". Brooker said it was made as "a lost corner of the late 70s that's shot through with a sort of modern sensibility". The local newspaper Harrow Online reported that it was filmed in Harrow, London, in June 2022, under the code name "Project Red Book". Exterior shots of Possetts were sighted in Greenhill, Harrow. Udo Kramer designed sets for all series six episodes. Kramer said that much research was done on 1970s department stores; the furniture and fixtures were made specifically for the episode and the colour palette was chosen to match the period. NVIZ Studio worked on the news reports that show Smart's rise to fascist leader, with iterations of Britannia Party messaging over three decades. Additional black-and-white photography was taken by David Hurn. The soundtrack was composed by Christopher Willis and released on 21 July 2023.

Ali and Vasan, both immigrants, spoke about the racial themes of the episode during the production process. Vasan could relate to Nida as an Indian-born woman who moved to Singapore in childhood and Britain in adulthood. Nida's fantasies of violence, according to Vasan, may be "so vivid" because Nida has to repress her emotions despite constant microaggressions against her. Vasan's first question to the writers was over Nida's comment "people said my mum was mad". This is left unexplained, so Vasan speculated that Nida's mother may have been "loud and eccentric" and, unlike Nida, not tried to assimilate to England. This contrasts with the interpretation that Nida's mother had mental health issues and Nida imagined Gaap. Vasan thought that Nida herself questions whether she is "just going insane".

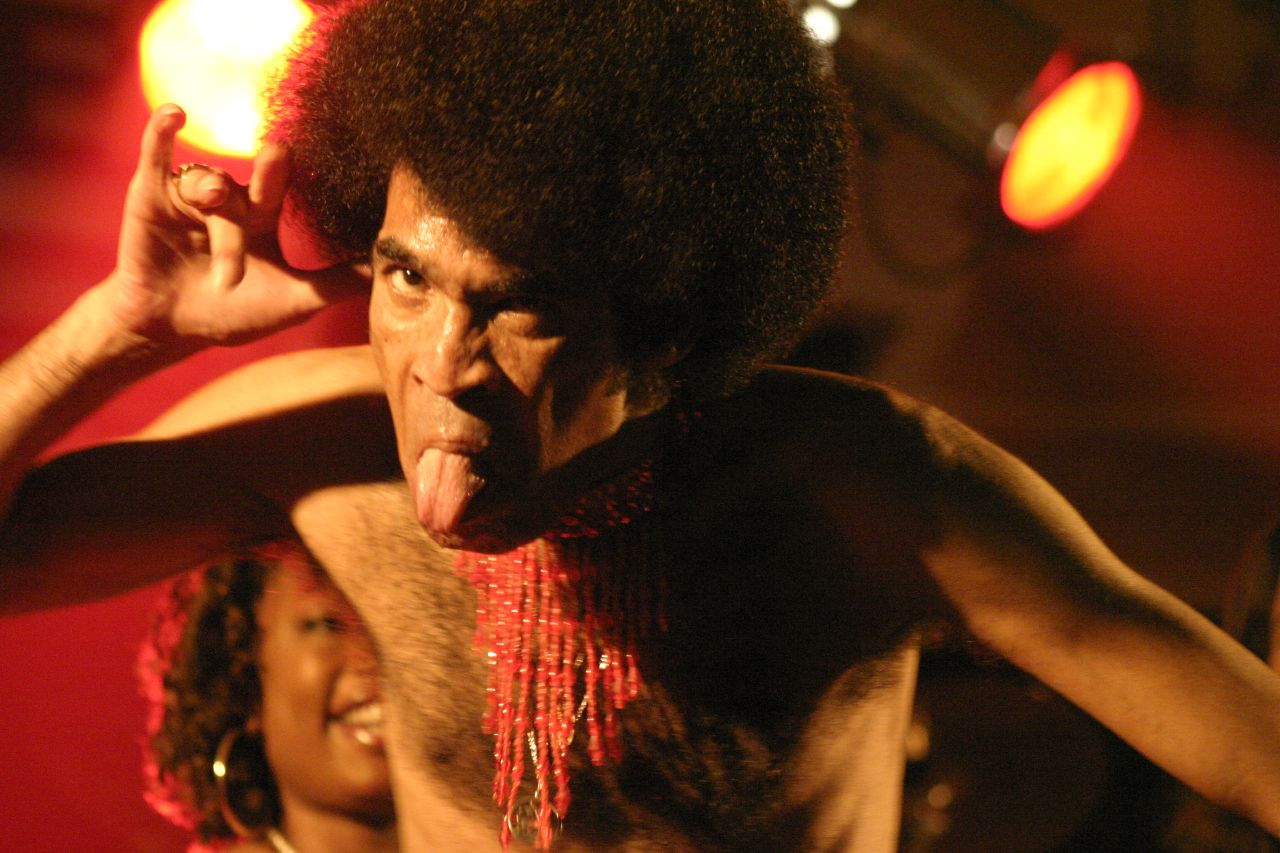
The appearance of Gaap was inspired by Bobby Farrell of Boney M.

Gaap was initially written as a punk figure, similar to the skinheads seen outside Nida's door, to embody Nida's fears. Costume fittings were done with Essiedu as a punk. As Nida and Gaap developed to have a close relationship, Gaap's appearance was changed to appeal to Nida. Essiedu said the episode could be seen as a love story between the two. Vasan said that they had natural chemistry due to a shared background in theatre.

Brooker said that while listening to a playlist he made of late 1970s music he recalled the "strong visual look" of Boney M. and based Gaap's appearance on Farrell. Nida is "intrigued" or "excited" or "titillated" by Gaap, according to Essiedu. He said that Farrell was one of multiple "hyper-femme men" entering popular culture around this time. Essiedu described Farrell's role in the band as "his physicality, his dancing, his vibes", and tried to capture this "showmanship". Essiedu's outfit included black nails, shoulder pads, and six-inch platform shoes.

Essiedu saw the political themes of "Demon 79" as having contemporary relevance, as the episode features an active political party and "the same kind of campaign slogans" as modern politicians. Vasan drew parallels to modern politicians using the anti-immigration slogan "stop the boats". Essiedu saw the ending as "quite hopeful", choosing to show Nida and Gaap leaving Earth rather than the reality of spending forever together.

According to the production, the decision to have Gaap teleport wherever Nida looks when she is trying to run away was made on the day of filming, with Essiedu crouching and running to minimise the "camera trickery". Haynes discussed with Vasan what it would feel like to Nida when Gaap shows a horrifying vision—like a panic attack or the inability to breathe—and Vasan experimented with her reactions on set.

== Analysis ==
The episode is a supernatural horror and fantasy story, lacking the science fiction elements of other Black Mirror episodes. Tonally, it evokes horror films of the 1970s, such as Hammer Horror or video nasties—low-budget, violent films. Additionally, it incorporates elements of comedy. In The Independent, Nick Hilton classified it as the most comedic episode of the sixth series through the "mismatched partnership" of Nida and Gaap, with a similar combination of comedy, violence and apocalypse to The Cabin in the Woods (2011). Ed Power, writing in The Daily Telegraph, said that it was "cartoonish" while maintaining serious themes. GQ's Jack King suggested it was a buddy film due to the unlikely partnership of Nida and Gaap.

Reviewers commented that the episode would fit in classic or contemporary anthology series such as Tales from the Darkside (1983–1988) or Guillermo del Toro's Cabinet of Curiosities (2022). However, Time's Judy Berman wrote that it shares "a shift in reality" that contains social commentary and "ends in a monster twist" with other Black Mirror episodes. Jen Chaney of Vulture commented that the "futuristic terror" was nuclear war or the racist Tipley characters' fears of white people being outnumbered. With a British cast, dark humour and "budget aesthetic", King saw it as a "return to roots" for the programme. The episode's ending can be interpreted as happy, which contrasts with most Black Mirror instalments.

"Demon 79" is set during the 1979 United Kingdom general election that led to Conservative Margaret Thatcher becoming prime minister. Brooker said that the election saw a change in British politics, with a "populist tsunami" that led the world to become "more hawkish". Smart resembles the politician Enoch Powell. He uses indirect phrases such as "crime is on the rise" and "the neighbourhood is changing" to allude to racist ideas. Political themes have appeared in the series before, in "The National Anthem" and "The Waldo Moment". As in "The National Anthem", a character is blackmailed into immoral acts for a greater good.

A glyph from "White Bear" matches the symbol on the talisman Nida finds.

As foreshadowing, Nida discovers old newspaper headlines describing a series of murders and a May Day celebration—this implies that Possett, the department store founder, previously used the talisman. "Demon 79" is connected to other Black Mirror episodes with Easter egg references: the talisman is engraved with a symbol first seen in "White Bear" that accompanies malicious power, and the same symbol appears as the emblem of Smart's ultranationalist Britannia Party. Nida's vision of Smart includes a robot dog that is from the world of "Metalhead". Other series six episodes make brief references to Smart and a child sex ring in Tipley.

The soundtrack includes two Boney M. songs: "Rasputin" (1978) and "Ma Baker" (1977). The latter signifies that Nida "has shed her meek demeanor and is ready to kill", according to Den of Geek's Brynna Arens, as the lyrics inform the listener that "Ma Baker is the FBI's most wanted woman". In the same scene, Nida steals a red leather jacket: Vasan said its "explosive pop of colour" contrasts with the many shades of brown in the shoe department. It shows a change from her initial decision to wear all-brown and "blend into the background". Her subsequent attack on Smart is more aggressive and less hesitant than her previous killings, although she is unwilling to hurt Len and fails to kill Smart. Len fits 1970s tropes, as a police officer with a moustache who leaves cigarette ash on a corpse.

Viewers are led to question whether Gaap is real or if Nida is imagining the events. Nida and Vicky both mention dreaming, as does the song "Bright Eyes" (1979) by Art Garfunkel. Nida reads Shakti Gawain's Creative Visualisation: Use the Power of Your Imagination To Create What You Want in Life (1978). During her police interrogation, the talisman is shown to be a domino, suggesting Nida's account of events may be unreliable; and one police officer, having heard the whole account concludes "her mind is gone". However, the apocalyptic ending may vindicate Nida.

Critics compared the premise to Knock at the Cabin (2023), an M. Night Shyamalan film. Sam Haysom of Mashable saw resemblance to Stephen King's sci-fi novel The Dead Zone (1979). Within both works, the main character discovers that a right-wing politician is set to become the leader of their country and commit terrible acts. The main character sets out to prevent this. Nida's aim—to kill three people to save many—was seen as an example of the trolley problem thought experiment by Screen Rant's Greg MacArthur.

== Reception ==
The episode achieved positive critical reception: on the review aggregator Rotten Tomatoes, it holds an approval rating of 100% based on 13 reviews. The Independent and Vulture rated it four stars out of five; Den of Geek gave it 4.5 stars; The Daily Telegraph rated it five stars. Reviewers liked Essiedu and Vasan's acting: Alan Sepinwall, in Rolling Stone, described them as "so much fun" and "so good", respectively. Vulture's Ben Rosenstock thought they had "great chemistry" and The New York Observer's Laura Babiak called them the "most watchable pair" of the series. Leila Jordan, in Paste, praised their "thoroughly entertaining" shifts between comedy and horror.

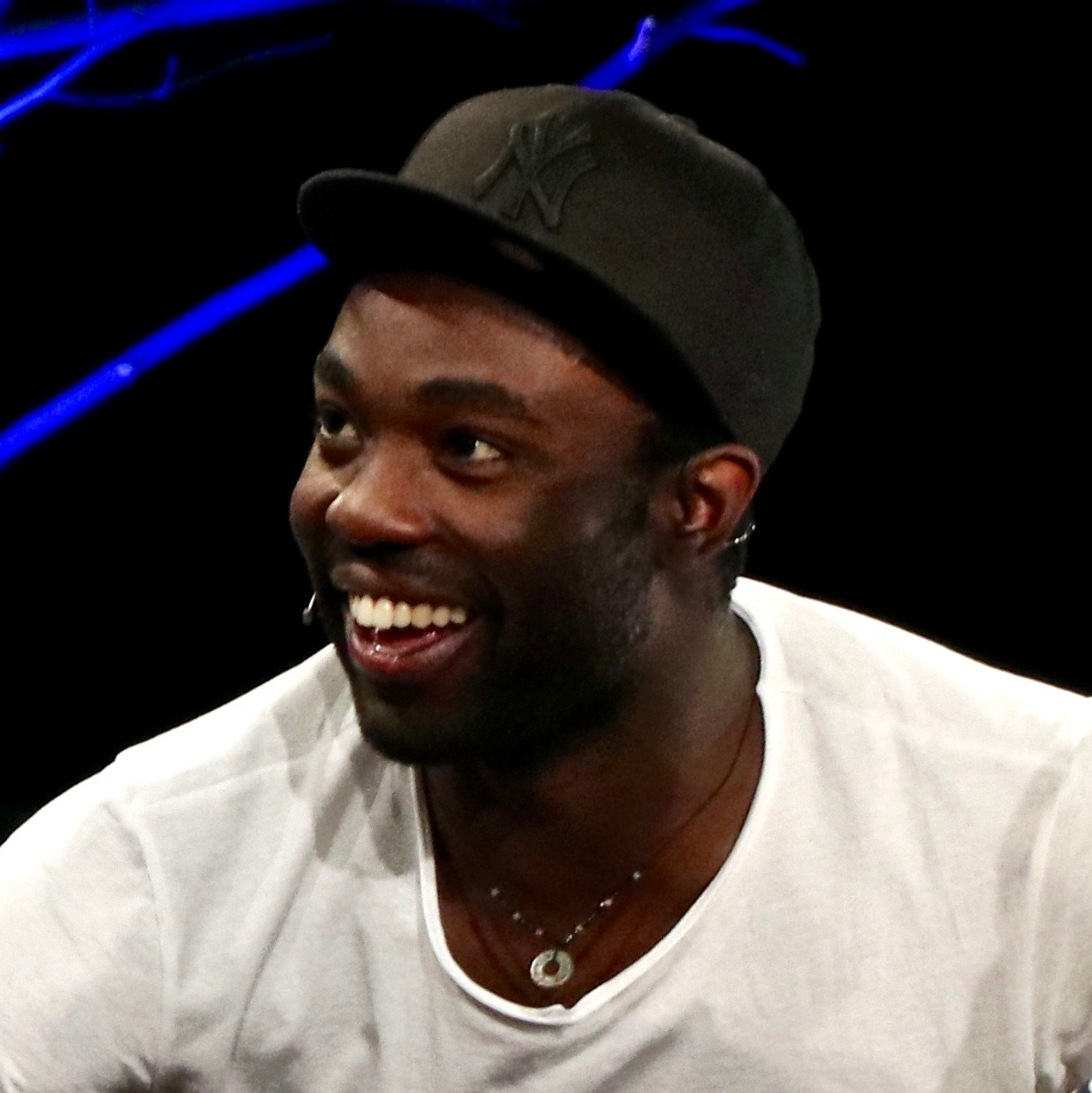
Many critics praised Paapa Essiedu's acting as Gaap.

Gaap's characterisation was particularly highlighted for praise, with The Guardian's Stuart Heritage attributing the episode's success to Essiedu. Den of Geek's Louisa Mellor compared Gaap to the angel Clarence Odbody in the film It's a Wonderful Life (1946). Amy West, reviewing for GamesRadar+, said that Gaap's "deliciously camp flair" was aided by "one of the most fabulously flamboyant costumes" in the programme. Emily Baker of i positively reviewed the "hilarious delivery and ostentatious clobber" of Essiedu, while Variety's Daniel D'Addario commented that Gaap is charismatic. King described Gaap as exemplifying Essiedu's acting range, through expressions of exasperation and bemusement. Andrew Webster of The Verge summarised that Gaap's "ray of positivity" provides well-timed levity.

Vasan as Nida was also lauded. Rosenstock found Nida "easily the most compelling protagonist" of series six. D'Addario praised her "wide-eyed gumption" and Vasan's ability to "think through, onscreen", the ethical quandaries and limits of what Nida is capable of. West found that Vasan balanced comedy with pathos. Webster wrote that Nida develops naturally as a character throughout the story.

The episode's tone was positively received. Heritage wrote that it was a "successful experiment" for Black Mirror and King saw it as the best episode for many years. Despite saying the premise was not original, Webster believed that "Demon 79" found a "unique voice". Rosenstock found that the episode achieved the "perfect tonal balance" between funny and dramatic. Babiak approved of the "genre flare" such as the opening titles, grainy camera and gore. According to James Hibbs of Radio Times, the episode "brilliantly weaves in social commentary throughout". However, Jordan wrote that the 1970s horror homage and political criticism are not consistent throughout the episode or combined well. Entertainment Weekly reviewers said that the episode suffered from a lack of "tension in the central mystery". Rosenstock praised Keith's death scene as "fascinating", because he is "accepting he's about to die as a punishment".

Some reviewers highlighted that the episode is longer than typical for the programme. Babiak believed that it "gets bogged down" by its runtime. Contrastingly, Sepinwall said the episode's "lightness forgives some of the padding". Rosenstock approved of the episode's conclusion, which vindicates Nida and allows a happy ending despite nuclear apocalypse. Babiak found it "refreshing" that the episode provides a "twisted sense of catharsis" more than a moral. On the other hand, Esquire's Brady Langmann criticised the ending as "puzzling" and Vulture's Charles Bramesco described it as a "cop-out whimper" that "undercuts the moral scale-tapping preceding it".

=== Episode rankings ===
"Demon 79" ranked below average on critics' lists of the 28 instalments of Black Mirror, from best to worst:

- 5th – James Hibbs, Radio Times
- 9th – Lucy Ford, Jack King and Brit Dawson, GQ
- 13th – Ed Power, The Daily Telegraph
- 21st – Amit Katwala, Matt Reynolds and James Temperton, Wired
- 22nd – James Hibberd and Christian Holub, Entertainment Weekly
- 23rd – Charles Bramesco, Vulture
- 24th – Brady Langmann, Esquire

GamesRadar+ and IndieWire listed the 27 episodes, excluding Bandersnatch, where "Demon 79" placed 20th and 22nd, respectively. The New York Observer rated it third-best of the five episodes in series six.

=== Awards and nominations ===
Year	Organisation	Category	Nominee(s)	Result	Ref.
2024	British Academy Television Awards	Best Limited Drama	"Demon 79"	Nominated	
2024	British Academy Television Awards	Best Actress	Anjana Vasan	Nominated	
2024	British Academy Television Craft Awards	Best Costume Design	Matthew Price	Nominated	
2024	British Academy Television Craft Awards	Best Photography and Lighting: Fiction	Stephan Pehrsson	Won	
2024	British Academy Television Craft Awards	Best Production Design	Udo Kramer	Nominated	
2024	British Academy Television Craft Awards	Best Scripted Casting	Jina Jay	Nominated	
2024	British Academy Television Craft Awards	Best Writer: Drama	Charlie Brooker, Bisha K. Ali	Won	
2024	British Society of Cinematographers Awards	TV Drama Operators	Edward Clark	Nominated	
