= Beyond the Sea (Black Mirror) =

- Black Mirror episode
- Promotional poster
- Episode no.: Series 6 Episode 3
- Directed by: John Crowley
- Written by: Charlie Brooker
- Cinematography by: Stuart Bentley
- Editing by: Jon Harris
- Original air date: 15 June 2023
- Running time: 80 minutes

Guest appearances
- Aaron Paul as Cliff Stanfield; Josh Hartnett as David Ross; Kate Mara as Lana Stanfield; Auden Thornton as Jessica Ross; Rory Culkin as Kappa

Episode chronology
← Previous "Loch Henry"	Next → "Mazey Day"

"Beyond the Sea" is the third episode of the sixth series of the anthology series Black Mirror. It was written by the series creator Charlie Brooker and directed by John Crowley. Alongside the rest of the sixth series, it premiered on Netflix on 15 June 2023. Set in a retrofuturistic 1969, it follows two astronauts, Cliff (Aaron Paul) and David (Josh Hartnett), who inhabit replicas of their bodies on Earth. The astronauts grapple with an unfathomable tragedy that occurs on Earth.

Brooker conceived of the episode as a story about working from home. It was influenced by the Manson Family cult active in the 1960s. The title comes from an English version of "La Mer", a song prominent in the episode. Filming took place for three weeks in summer 2022 across multiple locations; namely Whitstable, Rye and Dungeness in England. Filming also took place across both London and Spain. Aaron Paul, a fan of Black Mirror, plays both Cliff and David inhabiting Cliff's replica. He had agreed to a cameo in the fourth series opener "USS Callister" in 2017 under the condition that he could appear in the series again.

Critics identified the episode as character-driven: Cliff is more strict and uptight than David. The masculinity of each character is explored, as is Lana's experience of isolation. The acting was widely praised by reviewers, as was the episode's emotional, contemplative tone, although the plot and pacing garnered a mixed reaction. Overall, many critics considered it the best episode of the sixth series.

== Plot ==
In an alternate history 1969, Cliff Stanfield (Aaron Paul) and David Ross (Josh Hartnett) are astronauts two years into a six-year mission. They can transfer their consciousness to artificial copies of their bodies on Earth when not needed on the ship for routine checks and exercise.

As Cliff and his wife Lana (Kate Mara) recently moved to the countryside with their son Henry, Lana suggests a garden party to meet neighbours, but Cliff rejects the idea. David goes to the movies with his son, daughter, and wife Jessica (Auden Thornton) for his son's birthday. He dances to "La Mer" with Jessica and they share an intimate moment. David and Cliff are both interrupted by an alert, leading the two to return to their real bodies. On the station, Cliff repairs the solar coating of the station while David supervises. They then return to their replica bodies on Earth.

At night, David hears intruders and approaches with a baseball bat. The four intruders—led by Kappa (Rory Culkin)—comprise a cult that oppose artificial humans. They tie David up; he watches as they kill his family and destroy his replica.

Restricted to the spaceship, David falls silent in grief and is at risk of suicide, which greatly worries Cliff, as it takes two people to run the ship. At Lana's suggestion, Cliff lets David use his replica to walk through the forest. David, in Cliff's replica, breaks down in tears and Lana embraces him.

Back on the ship, Cliff is heartened by David's drawing of his house from memory and allows David to use his replica for an hour per week to recreate it as an oil painting.

David and Lana grow more familiar during his visits; he becomes infatuated with her and she enjoys his attentiveness. When David runs out of linseed oil, he convinces Lana to take a trip into town. They buy a book he recommends; the shopkeeper mistakes David for Cliff and offers condolences to David. Later, David dances with Lana to "La Mer", but she rejects his sexual advances. Henry vandalizes David's painting, so David hits him. Lana demands he leave and tries to convince Cliff not to allow him back.

Cliff discovers nude sketches of Lana in David's room on the ship. Cliff punches David, who believes Cliff is unappreciative of what he has. When Cliff confronts Lana, she confesses to her feelings of neglect and to David's advances, which she insists she rejected. The couple reconcile.

Days later, Cliff responds to an alert and takes a spacewalk, but discovers there is no problem. Meanwhile, David uses Cliff's replica to kill Lana and Henry. Cliff discovers his replica is covered in blood and finds the bodies. When Cliff returns to the ship, David wordlessly offers him a seat.

== Production ==
Black Mirror went on hiatus after its fifth series was released in 2019. Its executive producers, Charlie Brooker and Annabel Jones, departed from the production company House of Tomorrow and joined Broke and Bones, leading to negotiations for production rights. During this time, Brooker took a break from Black Mirror and worked on more comedic projects. In May 2022, Netflix announced that a sixth Black Mirror series was in development. Broke and Bones produced the series, while House of Tomorrow's parent company, Banijay, retained ownership.

Brooker was the screenwriter for "Beyond the Sea". He wrote the episode as a reaction to COVID-19 lockdowns in the UK, viewing it as a story about working from home. On its initial conception, a character's family are killed by a climate change-induced forest fire. However, the setting was changed to 1969—inspired by the historical setting of "Demon 79", the first episode in the sixth series to be written. "Beyond the Sea" was influenced by science fiction of the era, and the Helter Skelter predictions of the Manson Family cult active in the 1960s. Brooker wrote the characters to follow behavioural norms of this period, saying they act differently due to the lack of mobile phones.

The episode title "Sea of Tranquility" was considered, in reference to a fictional television show referred to throughout Black Mirror. The final title "Beyond the Sea" references an English version of "La Mer". Brooker said the song was "haunting" and "timeless". Brooker mentioned a number of books in his script that are shown onscreen, including The Illustrated Man (1959)—as the 1969 film had scared him—and Valley of the Dolls (1966), as a joke about Lana living with a replica.

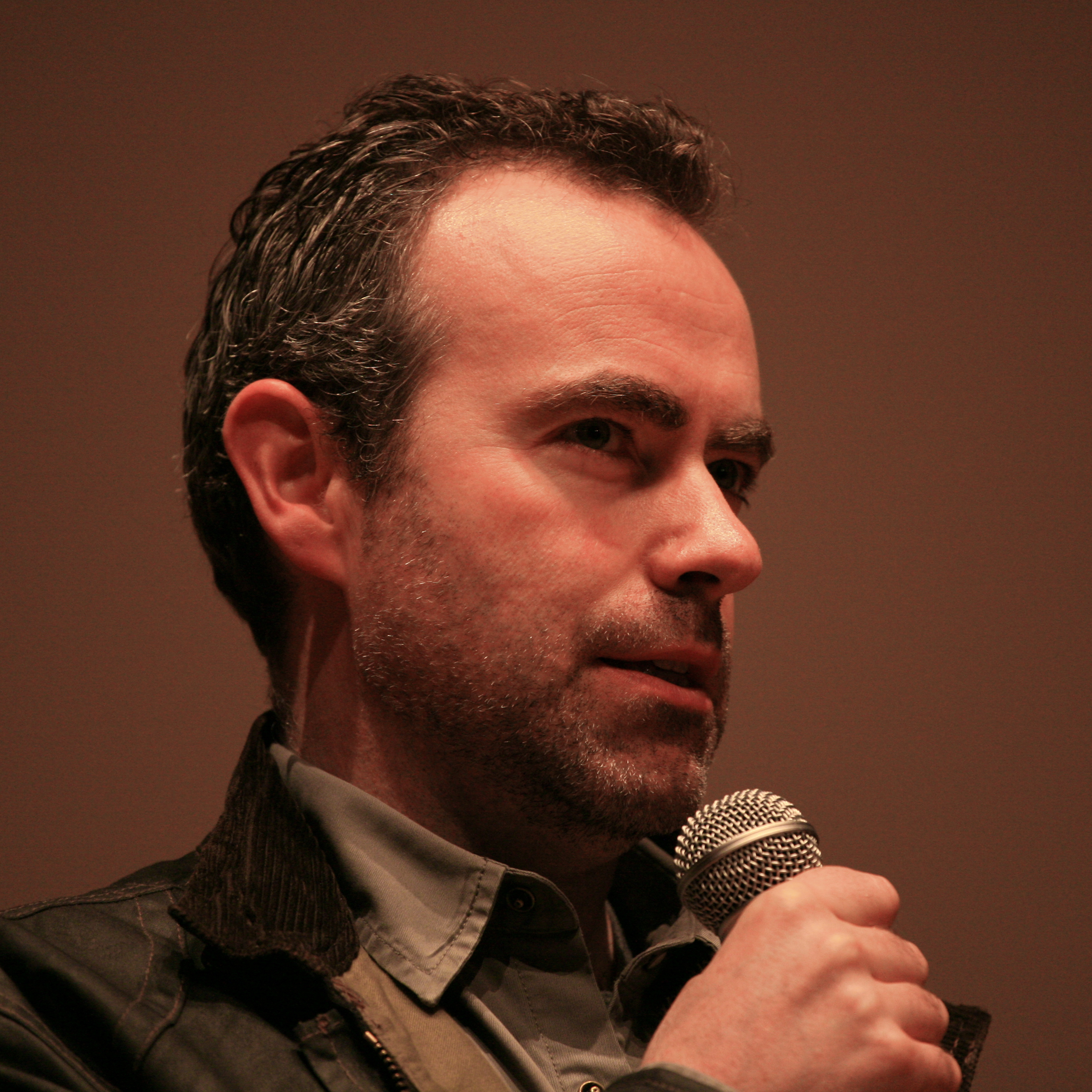
John Crowley directed "Beyond the Sea".

First reports in July 2022 revealed the casting of Aaron Paul, Josh Hartnett, Kate Mara, and Auden Thornton, with the casting of Rory Culkin announced in April 2023. The director was John Crowley. Udo Kramer designed sets for all series six episodes. The soundtrack was composed by Volker Bertelmann and released on 21 July 2023.

=== Casting ===
Aaron Paul is among the few actors to have two appearances in Black Mirror, after a voice cameo appearance in the space-themed series four episode "USS Callister". He accepted the cameo under the condition that it not preclude him from future appearances, since the series has a nearly-unbroken policy of never using the same screen actor or actress twice in separate episodes. He had also auditioned for a different episode, and was approached for a series five appearance, but could not appear due to other commitments. Paul was a big Black Mirror fan and stated that the show had encouraged him to limit his use of technology and social media—to the point of not owning a computer. Paul was friends with Mara prior to filming and had met Hartnett before. He had spent a lot of time on farms and had stargazing as a hobby since childhood.

Paul described Cliff as "heavy-handed", but imagined that Cliff saw himself as a "sweet, delicate, nice, loving father" in comparison to his father. In comparison to Paul, Cliff is "standoffish" and "by the book". He said Cliff had "deep-rooted baggage" and an inability to communicate, but realised this and "started to go down the right path" once learning of David's love for Lana. When filming Cliff's discovery of his family's murder, Paul avoided viewing the set to give realism to his reaction, asking only to know the camera locations.

Mara was also a fan of the series and was keen to work on "Beyond the Sea" because of its exploration of relationships. Mara saw that David, Cliff and Lana all experienced isolation. In Lana's case, she lacks options due to her status as a housewife in the 1960s, but wants her husband to feel present. Hartnett was not present for filming of the scenes where Paul plays David in Cliff's replica. Instead, rehearsals and discussions focused on this element. According to Hartnett, the key was for Paul to embody David's "internal machinations", not to impersonate him. Mara said it was always clear which character Paul was playing as David is "much more present with Lana" while Cliff is "gone, in so many ways". Paul said he studied Hartnett's manner during rehearsals and wanted to capture his "inherent charm". Paul and Mara had dance lessons together in preparation for their dance to "La Mer".

Hartnett was offered the role a week before filming began. He said that David is an optimist who represents society's hopefulness towards space exploration. Commenting on David's situation, Hartnett said that a person's soul will "atrophy" if "love and connection" are taken from them. Paul believed David's oil painting plan had no initial ulterior motive. According to Hartnett, David ended up with three choices: to kill himself, Cliff, or Cliff's family. The middle choice would lead to his death indirectly. David decides on the last option as a way to "actually connect" to Cliff, as both of their families will have been murdered.

=== Filming ===
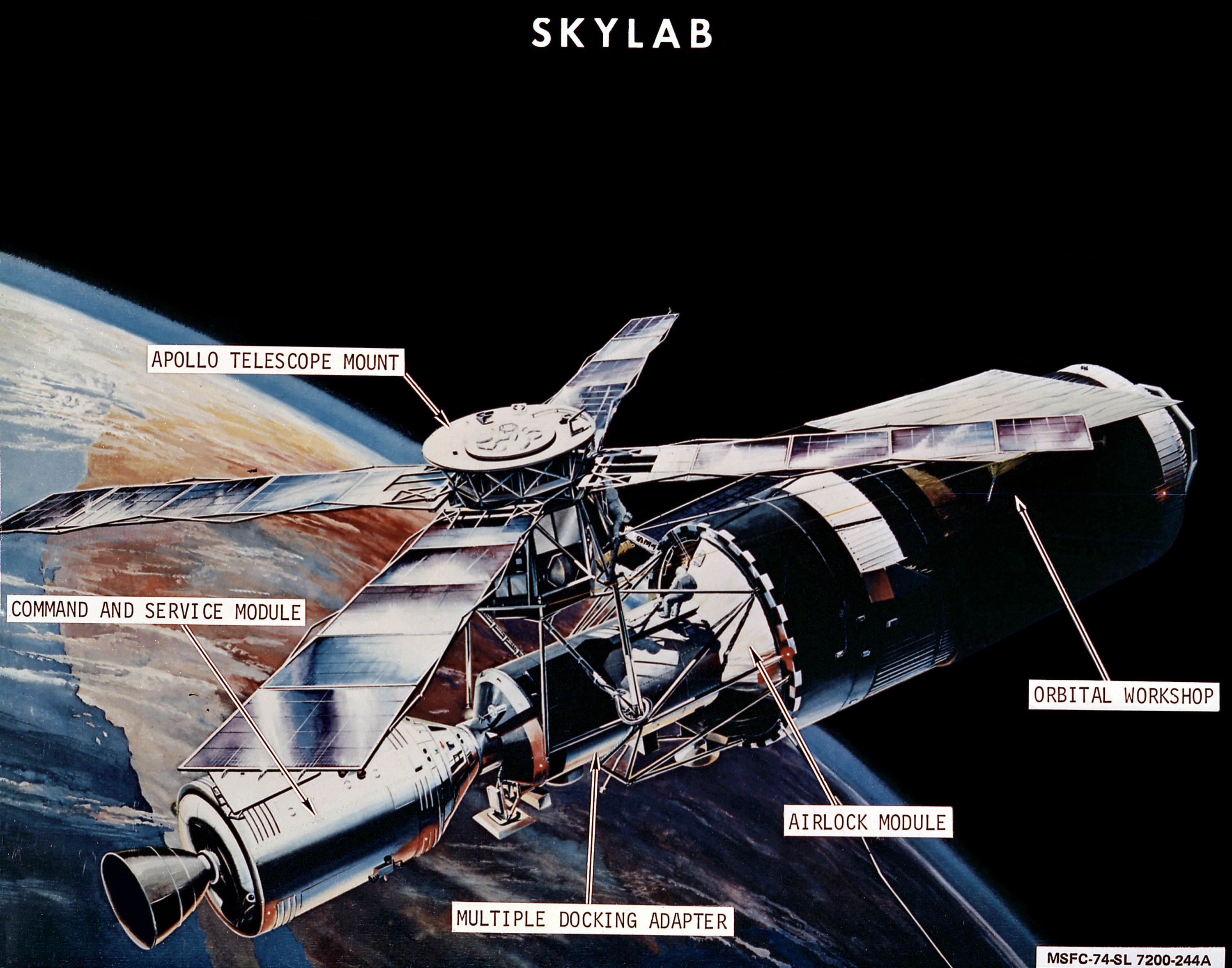
NASA's first space station, Skylab, was crewed in 1973 and 1974. It was an influence in the design for "Beyond the Sea".

After rehearsals in London, three weeks of filming was done in Whitstable, England, in the summer 2022 heatwaves. To represent Cliff's rural American house, the production used a house in Whitstable designed by a homesick American. They let the grass grow to give it an "untouched feeling", added a barn, and redesigned the interior to fit the 1960s. Filming for David and Lana's shopping trip took place at Rye, East Sussex, England.

The spaceship's interior was built in Twickenham, London—on the same soundstage where the Beatles recorded "Get Back" (1969). It was designed with NASA's Skylab in mind, which was launched in 1973. Kramer also took inspiration from the film 2001: A Space Odyssey (1968), but avoided the "flashing buttons and blinking lights" used in futuristic fiction of the era. According to Hartnett, it was designed to be "a little too small", so his height of 6 feet 3 inches (191 cm) meant that he struggled to get through doorways. This brought claustrophobia to the atmosphere.

Three nights of filming took place in Valencia, Spain, where a midcentury home was used for David's residence. According to Kramer, the house was built around a swimming pool and incorporated period details. Walls were added to change its layout and furniture was replaced. Kramer said the design had to be "very serious so that the drama pays off". Red tiling was replaced by a cream carpet to heighten the "off place" aura of the intruders and the effect of the red hue during the violence. Hartnett said the scene where David's family are killed was filmed "at the end of a very long night", time-limited, and emotional for him as a parent.

== Analysis ==
"Beyond the Sea" is a science fiction and a horror story. It is an example of retrofuturism, showing futuristic technology in a past setting. According to Den of Geek's Louisa Mellor, its setting is used "as the stage on which to tell a domestic tale". Ed Power, writing in The Daily Telegraph, found it reminiscent of the Golden Age of Science Fiction. Adi Robertson of The Verge believed that the 1960s period allowed suspension of disbelief by the viewer, as its more limited technology creates capacity for its characters' isolation. Hartnett noted that the killing of David's replica and his family mirrors the Manson Family's murder of Sharon Tate in 1969, the same year the episode is set. Kappa, the leader, represents Charles Manson.

Before "Beyond the Sea", past settings were featured in Black Mirror in "San Junipero" and Bandersnatch. The former shows pastiches of the 1980s, 1990s and 2000s, while the latter is set in 1984. Its exploration of grief through artificial humans is another commonality with "San Junipero", as well as "Be Right Back". Robertson said "Be Right Back" is more metaphorical than "Beyond the Sea", using an artificial human as a representation of a character's digital footprint. Marital issues, another theme of the episode, were also the subject of "The Entire History of You".

Robertson characterised the episode as a character study. Cliff and David are initially foils, with contrasting uptight and relaxed natures. Unlike Cliff, David demonstrates love for his children and wife, as well as interest in art and music. His wealth, job and family makes him "everything American society in 1969 told men they should be", Mellor wrote. Cliff represents an "older style of masculinity", according to Mellor: he is shown chopping wood, spearfishing and saying grace, and he is quite indifferent to his wife and child. According to Ben Rosenstock, in a review for Vulture, Lana begins to imagine David as "the Cliff she originally fell in love with", exemplified in her comments about David "wearing her husband like a suit".

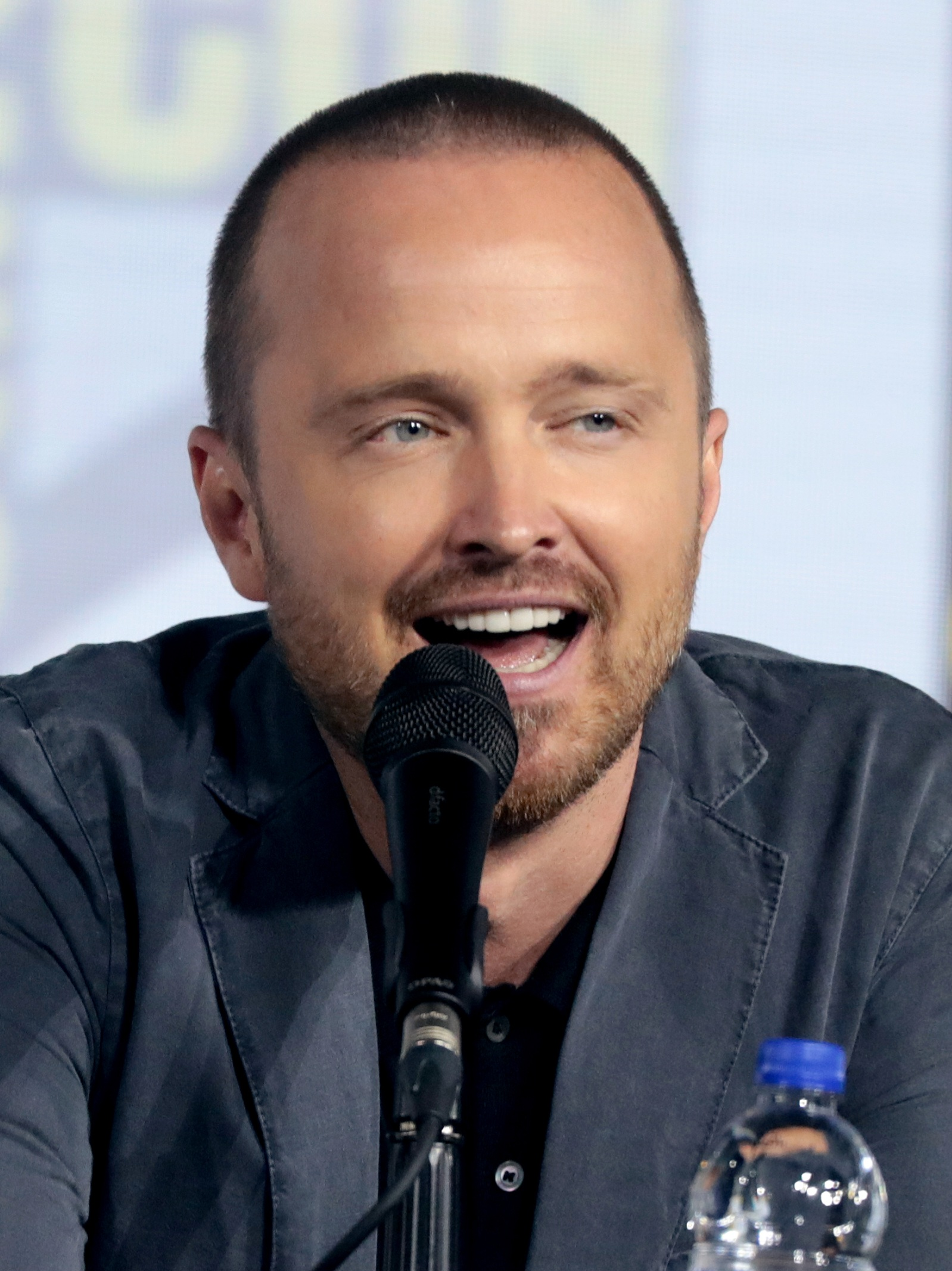
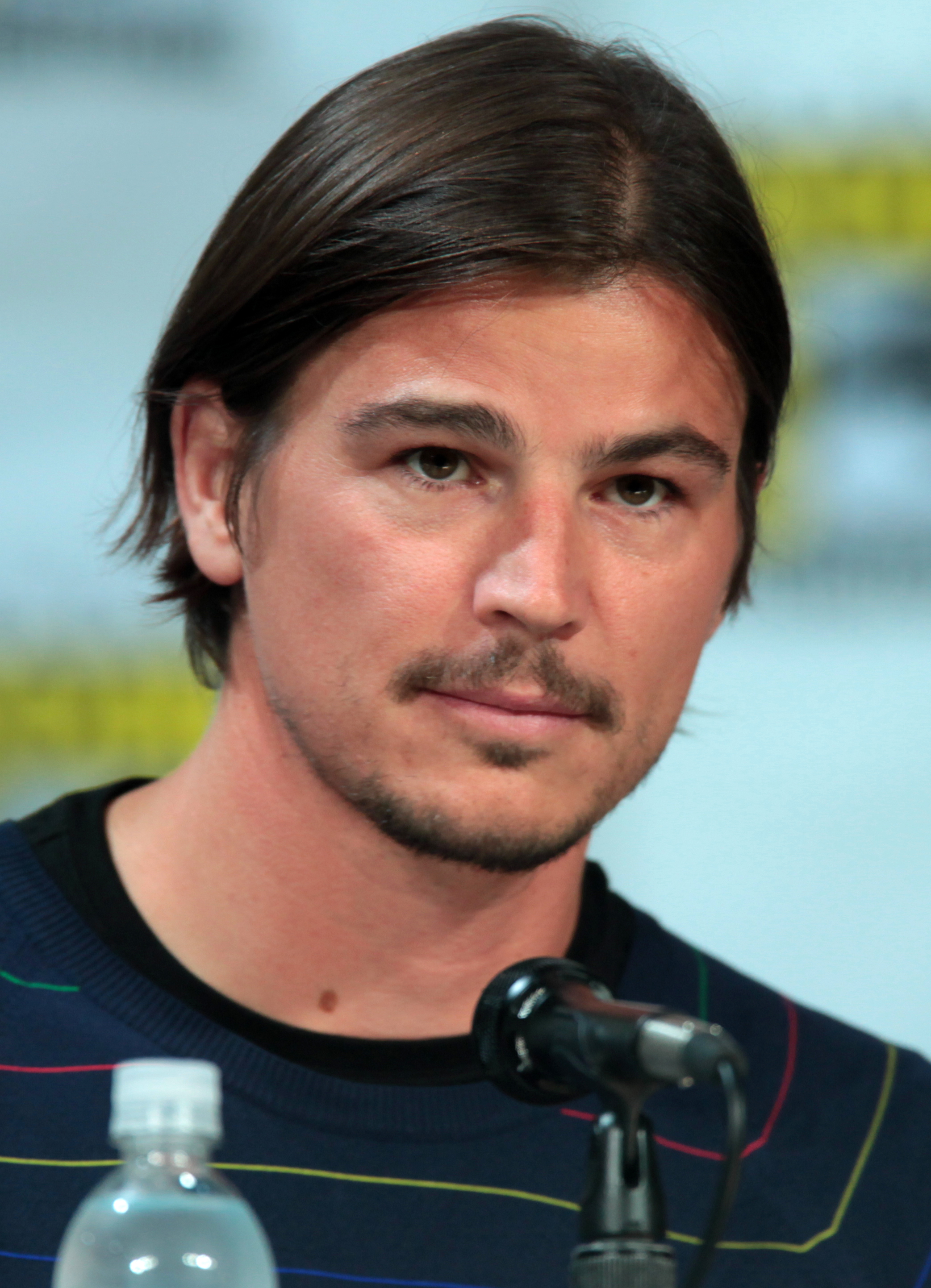
Aaron Paul (left) and Josh Hartnett (right) portrayed Cliff and David, respectively. The episode explores each character's masculinity.

In i, Emily Baker wrote that the episode exemplified how "men use violence against women as a tool". An example from Mellor is that David kills Lana as revenge against Cliff. Mellor commented that the men "treat wives and children as the property of husbands", in line with 1960s norms, and that "nothing is so dangerous to women and children as a man with a bruised ego". Cliff is terse towards his wife and hits his son to control his behaviour. Bryanna Arens, also writing in Den of Geek, believed that both Cliff and David show toxic masculinity, with a "rigid and limiting" understanding of manhood. They do not discuss their emotions, and Cliff is surprised when he learns that David cried in grief.

Robertson found the narrative "strikingly generous" towards both men: for instance, Cliff's decision to move to an isolated location makes sense given the violence against David's family (although the murder of David's family and his replica occurs after Cliff has already moved). However, Mellor believed that Cliff makes decisions to limit Lana's socialisation, such as rejecting her garden party idea to keep her "from the temptations and threats of other people". Arens analysed that David believes he is owed what he wants: he draws Lana naked without consent and continues caressing her after she tells him to stop.

Lana's books hint at the episode's plot. She is first seen reading Airport (1968), in which the protagonist's intense job leads to marital issues. Valley of the Dolls, which portrays sex and female friendship in New York City, may remind Lana of her previous lifestyle. Its characters suffer issues with relationships and loneliness. In The Moon Is a Harsh Mistress (1966), the book David recommends to Lana, a lunar colony revolts to free itself from Earth's control; its society has two men per woman.

== Reception ==
On the review aggregator Rotten Tomatoes, the episode holds an approval rating of 87% based on 15 reviews. It received five stars from i; The Independent, The Daily Telegraph and Den of Geek rated it four stars out of five; Vulture gave it two stars. Several critics saw it as the best episode in the sixth series.

Critics identified the episode's tone as an asset. The Independent's Nick Hilton and Time's Judy Berman praised its tone as similar to the programme's best installments, describing it as a "gloomy, high-concept" episode and one with a "poetic, emotional register", respectively. Robertson found that it was "driven by empathy", a rarity in the series. Paste's Leila Jordan lauded it as "enthralling and horrifying in all the best ways", while Power reviewed it as "unusually contemplative" and "lacking in Brooker's familiar vicious wit" under the direction of Crowley, a "master of mood". Less positively, Vanity Fair's Richard Lawson said that it had "solemn weight" but lacked the "zeitgeist verve" of other installments. Daniel D'Addario criticised it in Variety as resembling "an attempt to provide dramatic bona fides by going as grim as possible".

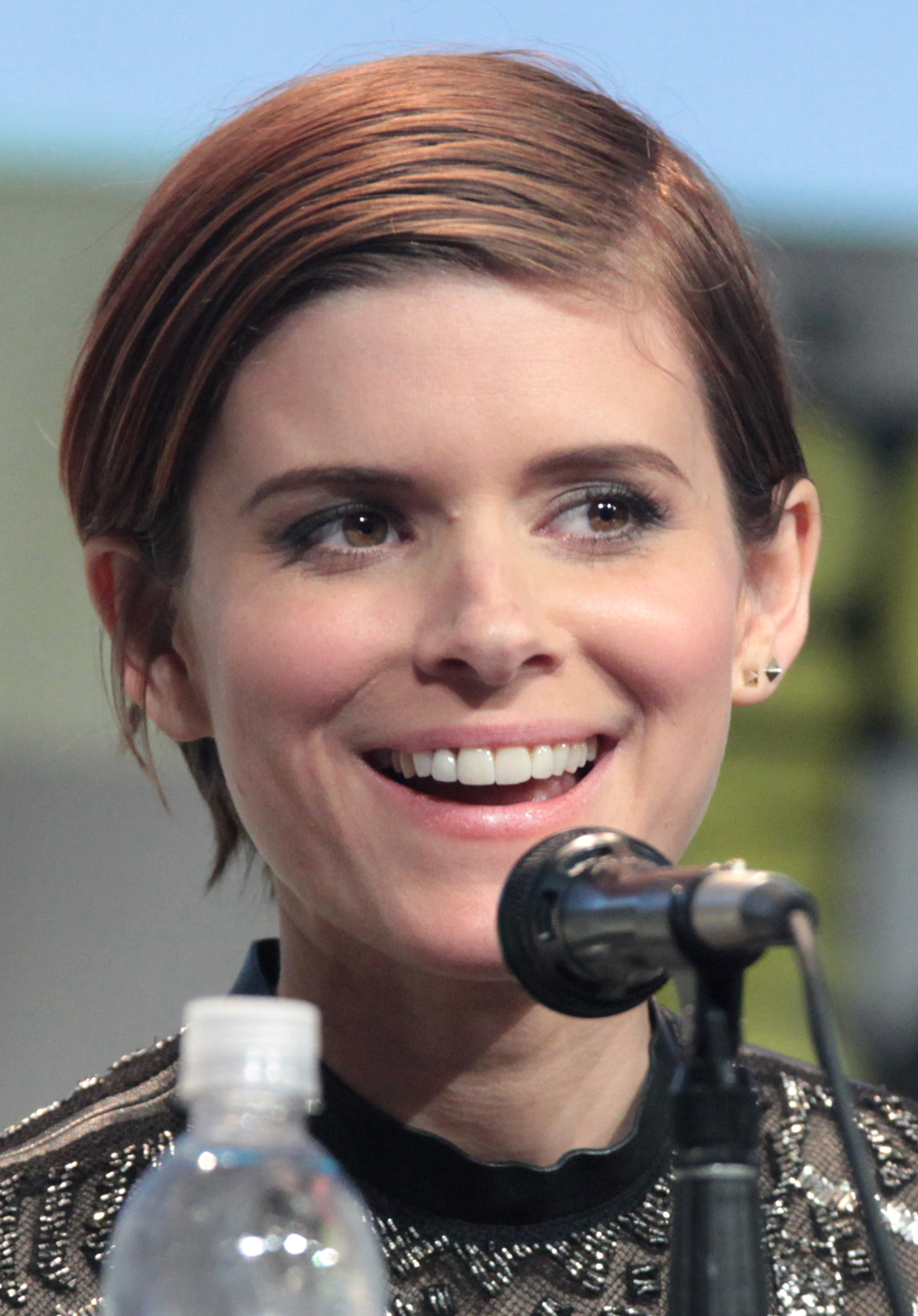
Kate Mara's performance as Lana garnered praise from reviewers.

The cast garnered acclaim, with reviewers identifying the episode as character-driven. For The A.V. Club, Kayleigh Dray wrote: "The power in this piece comes from its powerhouse performances"—namely, Culkin's "menacing turn", Mara's "gentle warmth", and the "ever-growing intensity of Paul and Hartnett". Lawson praised the "sharp, layered performances"; D'Addario found the cast, particularly Mara, capable of "acting out big emotions with delicate restraint". Neil Armstrong of BBC Culture believed that Paul gave the best performance in the series, despite the difficulty of showing emotion beneath his character's restraint. Baker also praised the "heartbreakingly raw turn" of Paul, and of Hartnett's transition from sympathetic to villainous. Baker reviewed Mara as the "emotional pivot" of the drama and said she gave "the performance of her career". In a negative review, Ehrlich nonetheless praised the cast. Rosenstock, contrastingly, believed the acting was too mute; he criticised Paul's distinction between Cliff and David as too subtle, Lana's lack of liveliness around David, and the lack of explanation for Cliff's stiff manner.

Reception to the plot was more polarised. For instance, whilst Dray believed the technology was "a poorly disguised plot device" and Far Out's Calum Russell found the worldbuilding lacking, Hilton thought the episode "tackles big sci-fi issues ... with superb confidence". Hilton compared it favourably to the space-themed science fiction films Moon (2009) and Sunshine (2007). Rosenstock found the plot easy to anticipate, while Lawson wrote that "Brooker smartly pushes past" the obvious early twists "toward a far bleaker place". Russell critiqued that the premise brought a "flood of possibilities" but the writers "frustratingly decided to go down the least enticing path". The episode would have been better, Russell suggested, if Lana fell in love with David rather than the reverse. The ending was praised as "stunning" and "admirably twisted" by Baker and Rosenstock, respectively.

Critics also dissented on the episode's length. Jordan saw it as a "well-told, concise story". Hilton suggested the climax was rushed and another 30 minutes could have developed the piece. Contrastingly, according to Power, some viewers may find it too slow in comparison to more "anarchic" episodes. Rosenstock said the "pregnant pauses" do not add value and Alan Sepinwall of Rolling Stone found that every beat is elongated and it "takes forever to set its plot in motion".

=== Episode rankings ===
"Beyond the Sea" placed as follows in critics' ratings of the 28 installments of Black Mirror:

- 3rd – James Hibbs, Radio Times
- 13th – James Hibberd and Christian Holub, Entertainment Weekly
- 16th – Charles Bramesco, Vulture
- 17th – Lucy Ford, Jack King and Brit Dawson, GQ

- 19th – Brady Langmann, Esquire
- 20th – Amit Katwala, Matt Reynolds and James Temperton, Wired
- 21st – Ed Power, The Daily Telegraph

GamesRadar+ and IndieWire listed the 27 episodes, excluding Bandersnatch, where "Beyond the Sea" placed 5th and 14th, respectively. The New York Observer described it as the best of the five episodes in series six.
