= 2024 British Academy Television Craft Awards =

Awards ceremony

25th British Academy Television Craft Awards
- Date: 28 April 2024
- Hosted by: Stacey Dooley

Highlights
- Most awards: Black Mirror: "Demon 79" / Eurovision Song Contest 2023 / Silo / Slow Horses / Once Upon a Time in Northern Ireland (2)
- Most nominations: Black Mirror: "Demon 79" (5)

The 25th Annual British Academy Television Craft Awards took place on 28 April 2024, presented by the British Academy of Film and Television Arts (BAFTA) to recognize technical achievements in British television of 2023.

The nominees were announced on 20 March 2024 alongside the nominations for the 2024 British Academy Television Awards. "Demon 79", the fifth episode of the sixth series of Black Mirror led the nominations with five, followed by The Crown, Silo, The Long Shadow and Slow Horses, each with four.

The series Black Mirror, Silo, Slow Horses, and Once Upon a Time in Northern Ireland, as well as the program Eurovision Song Contest 2023, all received the most craft awards with two wins each.

== Winners and nominees ==
The nominees were announced on 20 March 2024. Winners were announced during the ceremony.

Best Director: Fiction	Best Director: Factual
The Last of Us – Peter Hoar (HBO / Sky Atlantic); Partygate – Joseph Bullman (Channel 4); The Long Shadow: "Episode 6" – Lewis Arnold (ITV); Top Boy: "If We Are Not Monsters" – William Stefan Smith (Netflix)	Otto Baxter: Not a F***ing Horror Story – Peter Beard, Bruce Fletcher (Sky Documentaries); Exposure: "Inside Iran: The Fight for Freedom" – Gesbeen Mohammad (ITV); Once Upon a Time in Northern Ireland – James Bluemel (BBC Two); Lockerbie – John Dower (Sky Documentaries)
Best Director: Multi-Camera	Best Scripted Casting
Eurovision Song Contest 2023 – Nikki Parsons, Ollie Bartlett, Richard Valentine (BBC One); An Audience with Kylie – Julia Knowles (ITV); The Coronation Concert – Julia Knowles (BBC One); FA Cup Final – Paul McNamara (ITV)	Three Little Birds – Aisha Bywaters (ITVX); Time – Amy Hubbard (BBC One); Smothered – Amy Hubbard, Shannon Dowling-McNulty (Sky Max); Black Mirror: "Demon 79" – Jina Jay (Netflix)
Best Writer: Comedy	Best Writer: Drama
Big Boys – Jack Rooke (Channel 4); A Whole Lifetime with Jamie Demetriou – Jamie Demetriou (Netflix); Such Brave Girls – Kat Sadler (BBC Three); Juice – Mawaan Rizwan (BBC Three)	Black Mirror: "Demon 79" – Charlie Brooker, Bisha K. Ali (Netflix); Succession – Jesse Armstrong (HBO / Sky Atlantic); Happy Valley – Sally Wainwright (BBC One); The Sixth Commandment – Sarah Phelps (BBC One)
Best Original Music: Fiction	Best Original Music: Factual
Silo – Atli Örvarsson (Apple TV+); Heartstopper – Adiescar Chase (Netflix); Nolly – Blair Mowat (ITVX); Loki – Natalie Holt (Disney+)	Once Upon a Time in Northern Ireland – Simon Russell (BBC Two); Otto Baxter: Not a F***ing Horror Story – Ed Harcourt (Sky Documentaries); Wild Isles – George Fenton (BBC One); A Time to Die – Simon Rogers (ITV)
Best Entertainment Craft Team	Best Production Design
Eurovision Song Contest 2023 – Julio Himede, Tim Routledge, Kojo Samuel, Michael Sharp, Dan Shipton (BBC One); Squid Game: The Challenge – Diccon Ramsay, Paddy Fletcher, Rikki Finlay, James Tinsley, Mathieu Weekes, Ben Norman (Netflix); Banged Up – Jamie Heath, Nick Harvey, Greg Menzel (Channel 4); The Coronation Concert – Nigel Catmur, Tom Bairstow, Kevin Duff, Steve Nolan, Steve Sidwell, Simon Haw (BBC One)	Silo – Gavin Bocquet, Amanda Bernstein (Apple TV+); The Long Shadow – Anna Higginson (ITV); Nolly – Ben Smith (ITVX); Black Mirror: "Demon 79" – Udo Kramer (Netflix)
Best Costume Design	Best Make Up and Hair Design
The Great – Sharon Long (Lionsgate+); The Crown: "Ritz" – Amy Roberts (Netflix); Silo – Charlotte Morris (Apple TV+); Black Mirror: "Demon 79" – Matthew Price (Netflix)	The Long Shadow: "Episode 6" – Lisa Parkinson (ITV); The Crown: "Ritz" – Cate Hall, Emilie Yong-Mills, Fiona Rogers (Netflix); Slow Horses – Lucy Sibbick (Apple TV+); Three Little Birds – Sharon Miller, Kym Menzies-Foster, Kelly Taylor (ITVX)
Best Photography and Lighting: Fiction	Best Photography: Factual
Black Mirror: "Demon 79" – Stephan Pehrsson (Netflix); The Last of Us – Eben Bolter (HBO / Sky Atlantic); The Long Shadow – Ed Rutherford (ITV); The Sixth Commandment – Rik Zang (BBC One)	The Detectives: Taking Down an OCG – Benedict Sanderson (BBC Two); Animals Up Close with Bertie Gregory – Bertie Gregory, Tom Walker, Anna Dimitriadis (Disney+); The Man Who Played with Fire – Jean-Louis Schuller (Sky Documentaries); Dublin Narcos – Narayan Van Maele, Patrick Smith (Sky Documentaries)
Best Sound: Fiction	Best Sound: Factual
Slow Horses – Sound Team (Apple TV+); The Crown – Chris Ashworth, Lee Walpole, Stuart Hilliker, Martin Jensen, Saoirse Christopherson, Iain Eyre (Netflix); Boiling Point – Jules Woods, James Drake, Oscar Bloomfield-Crowe, Paddy McGuirk (BBC One); The Witcher – Matthew Collinge, James Bain, Robert Farr, Tom Melling, Matt Davies, Alyn Sclosa (Netflix)	The Coronation of TM The King and Queen Camilla – Sound Team (BBC One); If These Walls Could Sing – George Foulgham, Philip Moroz, Alex Gibson, Tom Verstappen, Adam Prescod (Disney+); The Enfield Poltergeist – Nick Ryan, Ben Baird, Kirstie Howell, Jack Wensley, Jamie McPhee, Alexej Mungersdorff (Apple TV+); Formula 1: Drive to Survive – Sound Team (Netflix)
Best Special, Visual and Graphic Effects	Best Titles and Graphic Identity
The Witcher – Tim Crosbie, Caimin Bourne, Jet Omoshebi, Dan Weir, Cinesite, David Stephens (Netflix); The Wheel of Time – Andy Scrase, Patricia Llaguno, Beau Garcia, Oliver Winwood, Huw Evans, Jodie Davidson (Prime Video); The Crown – Ben Turner, Reece Ewing, Framestore, Rumble VFX, Asa Shoul, Chris Reynolds (Netflix); Silo – Daniel Rauchwerger, Stefano Pepin, Richard Stanbury, Raphael Hamm, Ian Fellows (Apple TV+)	Wilderness – Tamsin McGee, Ben Hanbury, Hugo Moss, Paul McDonnell (Prime Video); Doctor Who: "Wild Blue Yonder" – Dan May, James Coore, Painting Practice, Realtime Visualisation (BBC One); Good Omens – Peter Anderson Studio (Prime Video); Queen Charlotte – Studio AKA (Netflix)
Best Editing: Fiction	Best Editing: Factual
Slow Horses: "Last Stop" – Sam Williams (Apple TV+); Time – Alex Mackie (BBC One); Happy Valley: "Episode 6" – Joe Carey (BBC One); Slow Horses: "Old Scores" – Zsófia Tálas (Apple TV+)	Once Upon a Time in Northern Ireland – Editing Team (BBC Two); Lockerbie – Charlie Hawryliw (Sky Documentaries); Formula 1: Drive to Survive – Editing Team (Netflix); Beckham – Michael Harte (Netflix)
Best Emerging Talent: Fiction	Best Emerging Talent: Factual
Kat Sadler (writer) – Such Brave Girls (BBC Three); Andrew Bogle (writer) – Kirkmoore (BBC Three); Haolu Wang (director) – Bodies (Netflix); Mawaan Rizwan (writer) – Juice (BBC Three)	Fred Scott (director) – London Bridge: Facing Terror (Channel 4); Ben Cheetham (director) – Pete Doherty, Who Killed My Son? (Channel 4); Fola Evans-Akingbola, Jordan Pitt (directors) – Untold Stories: Hair on Set (Sky Documentaries); Ted Evans (director) – Rose Ayling-Ellis: Sings for Change (BBC One)
Special Award
MAMA Youth Project

== See also ==
- 2024 British Academy Television Awards
