= Mazey Day (Black Mirror) =

- Black Mirror episode
- Promotional poster
- Episode no.: Series 6 Episode 4
- Directed by: Uta Briesewitz
- Written by: Charlie Brooker
- Cinematography by: David Luther
- Editing by: Tim Murrell
- Original air date: 15 June 2023
- Running time: 43 minutes

Guest appearances
- Zazie Beetz as Bo; Clara Rugaard as Mazey Day; Danny Ramirez as Hector; Robbie Tann as Whitty; James P. Rees as Duke; David Rysdahl as Nathan; Jack Bandeira as Terry; Corey Johnson as Clay; Kenneth Collard as Doctor Dmitri Babich

Episode chronology
← Previous "Beyond the Sea"	Next → "Demon 79"

"Mazey Day" is the fourth episode of the sixth series of the anthology series Black Mirror. It was written by series creator Charlie Brooker and directed by Uta Briesewitz. Alongside the rest of the sixth series, it premiered on Netflix on 15 June 2023. It tells the story of Bo (Zazie Beetz), a paparazzo, and Mazey Day (Clara Rugaard), an actress hiding from the media after a car accident.

It is the first supernatural horror episode in the show. Brooker wrote it after the sixth series episode "Demon 79", another horror story, and aimed to broaden the scope of the programme. Filming took place in June 2022 in Spain.

Set in 2006, the depicted paparazzi pursuit of Mazey was compared to media attention on Britney Spears, Paris Hilton, and Lindsay Lohan. The episode's twist was widely criticised by reviewers, along with the episode's premise and themes. Many critics considered "Mazey Day" the worst episode of the sixth series and one of the worst in the show.

== Plot ==
In 2006, a paparazza named Bo (Zazie Beetz) takes photographic evidence at a motel of a male celebrity having an affair with a man. He offers her $500 to delete the photos, but she sells them for $300 each, and the celebrity kills himself. Bo's colleagues Hector (Danny Ramirez), Whitty (Robbie Tann), and Duke (James P. Rees) are unsympathetic. They harass a celebrity whose sex tape has gone public: Whitty provokes her with misogynistic slurs and threatens legal action when she reacts. Bo decides to quit the profession.

The actress Mazey Day (Clara Rugaard) quits a film shoot in the Czech Republic after a hit and run under the influence of wine and hallucinogenic mushrooms and disappears from the public eye. A $30,000 reward is offered for the first image of her. Bo, who has been confronted by her flatmate Nathan (David Rysdahl) over late rent, tracks Mazey to a film producer's mansion via a takeaway place Mazey had mentioned in a magazine article. Mazey trashes the living room that night and Dr. Babich (Kenneth Collard) arranges for her to stay at a New Age rehab for the weekend. Bo follows the car but the driver stops at a diner to slash her tyres. She calls Hector to take them on a motorbike to the rehab compound; Hector is unaware that Whitty has placed a tracker on the motorbike and so Whitty arrives shortly afterwards with Duke.

The four paparazzi break into the compound and find Mazey chained up in a cabin with goats. As Bo undoes her chains, the others take dozens of photos. Mazey warns them to leave. As the full moon emerges, Mazey turns into a werewolf. Whitty and Duke continue taking pictures and are killed, and Bo and Hector try to escape. Hector's motorbike is struck by a car and the driver is attacked by the werewolf as Bo and Hector run through the woods. They make it to the diner and beg a police officer, Clay (Corey Johnson), to call for backup. Bo lunges to take his gun and he begins to restrain and handcuff her.

The werewolf arrives and kills or wounds everybody except Bo, who manages to shoot her with the police officer's handgun. Hector hands Bo his camera as he dies. Mazey, now heavily bleeding in human form, begs Bo to shoot her. Bo hands her the gun, and as Mazey points the gun at her own head, Bo prepares to take a photograph. A gunshot is heard.

== Production ==
Black Mirror went on hiatus after its fifth series was released in 2019. Its executive producers, Charlie Brooker and Annabel Jones, departed from the production company House of Tomorrow and joined Broke and Bones, leading to negotiations for production rights. During this time, Brooker took a break from Black Mirror and worked on more comedic projects. In May 2022, Netflix announced that a sixth Black Mirror series was in development. Broke and Bones produced the series, while House of Tomorrow's parent company, Banijay, retained ownership.

Brooker was the screenwriter for "Mazey Day". At 40 minutes, it is the shortest episode of the programme. According to Brooker, the early 2000s placed the setting before "everyone was a paparazzo" due to smartphones, where photographic evidence was much harder to forge. Other episodes in the series also had period settings.

The first episode of the sixth series to be written was "Demon 79", a horror story set in 1979. Brooker said this episode, labelled as Red Mirror, helped him find a new perspective for the series, closer to "people are fucked up" than "tech is bad". In writing "Mazey Day", Brooker considered "The National Anthem", the first episode, which "was obviously designed to be startling and surprising and weird". A Red Mirror title sequence for "Mazey Day" was made, but Brooker eventually chose the Black Mirror opening titles to conceal the supernatural twist. Brooker said that ideally, the titles would change to Red Mirror on repeat viewings. As of April 2025 the title has since been changed from Black Mirror to Red Mirror in the episode's opening sequence on Netflix.

=== Casting and filming ===
First reports in July 2022 revealed the casting of Zazie Beetz, Clara Rugaard and Danny Ramirez, who played Bo, Mazey Day and Hector, respectively. The director was Uta Briesewitz. Udo Kramer designed the sets for "Mazey Day", as well as the other series six episodes. Beetz said filming took place in June 2022. The local newspaper Diario Sur reported in that month that a Black Mirror episode was being filmed in the Spanish province of Málaga, under the name "Red Book". Locations included Marbella, Estepona and the Loasur studios in Coín. Running through the woods at night felt dangerous, Beetz reported, though some scenes set at night were filmed during the day.

Framestore worked on visual effects for the werewolf, including rigging for a digital double of Rugaard transforming into the creature. The werewolf's teeth underwent many iterations and a dedicated system for bones breaking and shifting was developed. The company NVIZ provided compositing of graphics such as computer and television screens and worked on redesigning Málaga backgrounds to resemble Los Angeles. The soundtrack was composed by Ariel Marx and released on 21 July 2023.

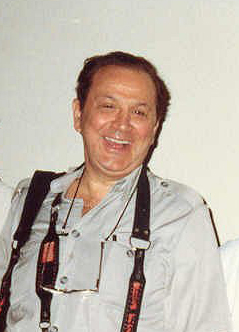
The paparazzo Ron Galella, subject of Smash His Camera

According to Beetz, the actors improvised slang and cultural references to the era. The attitude of paparazzi to young female celebrities in 2006 was considered. Rugaard watched documentaries on Britney Spears and Amy Winehouse, while Beetz and Ramirez watched Smash His Camera (2010), to compare Bo's motivations to the paparazzo Ron Galella. Beetz said Bo had self-loathing and chose not to empathise with people more privileged than herself. Ramirez commented that each character's shadow self is seen, as they are driven by both good and bad qualities.

Beetz believed that there was a difference between interviewing a celebrity and taking pictures without their consent. Ramirez commented that "the system itself" is at fault: while Hector or Bo invade people's privacy, they are forced to make money to pay rent. Beetz said the episode had a "tongue-in-cheek dark element". She said the message is that a person who reveals others' secrets will end up "raw and exposed" themselves. The episode uses the supernatural in place of technology, but Beetz said it led to "the same exploration of the human condition".

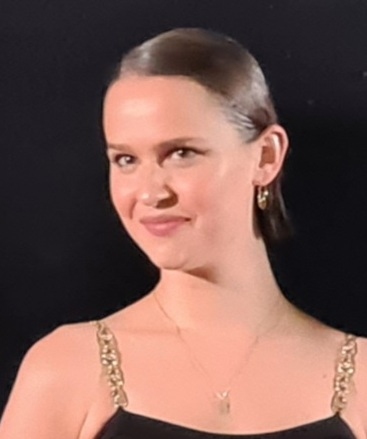
Clara Rugaard in 2021

Rugaard said that Mazey "just wants to exist in the world undisturbed". However, she had unwittingly entered a Faustian bargain where her acting success brought her into the public eye. Though she is commoditised and has fans who worship her, Mazey is lonely. Rugaard said that, as a werewolf, Mazey gets to regain control.

== Analysis ==
"Mazey Day", a horror story, is the first Black Mirror episode to feature the supernatural. It has elements of fantasy, another uncommon genre for the programme. It is less focused on technology than other instalments. Like the previous episodes "The National Anthem" and "Smithereens", all featured technology exists today, centrally the camera. To establish the setting, the 2006 birth of Suri Cruise is announced at the start of the episode. An iPod and mention of the Iraq War also indicate the era. Reference is made to Sea of Tranquility, a fictional programme from other episodes.

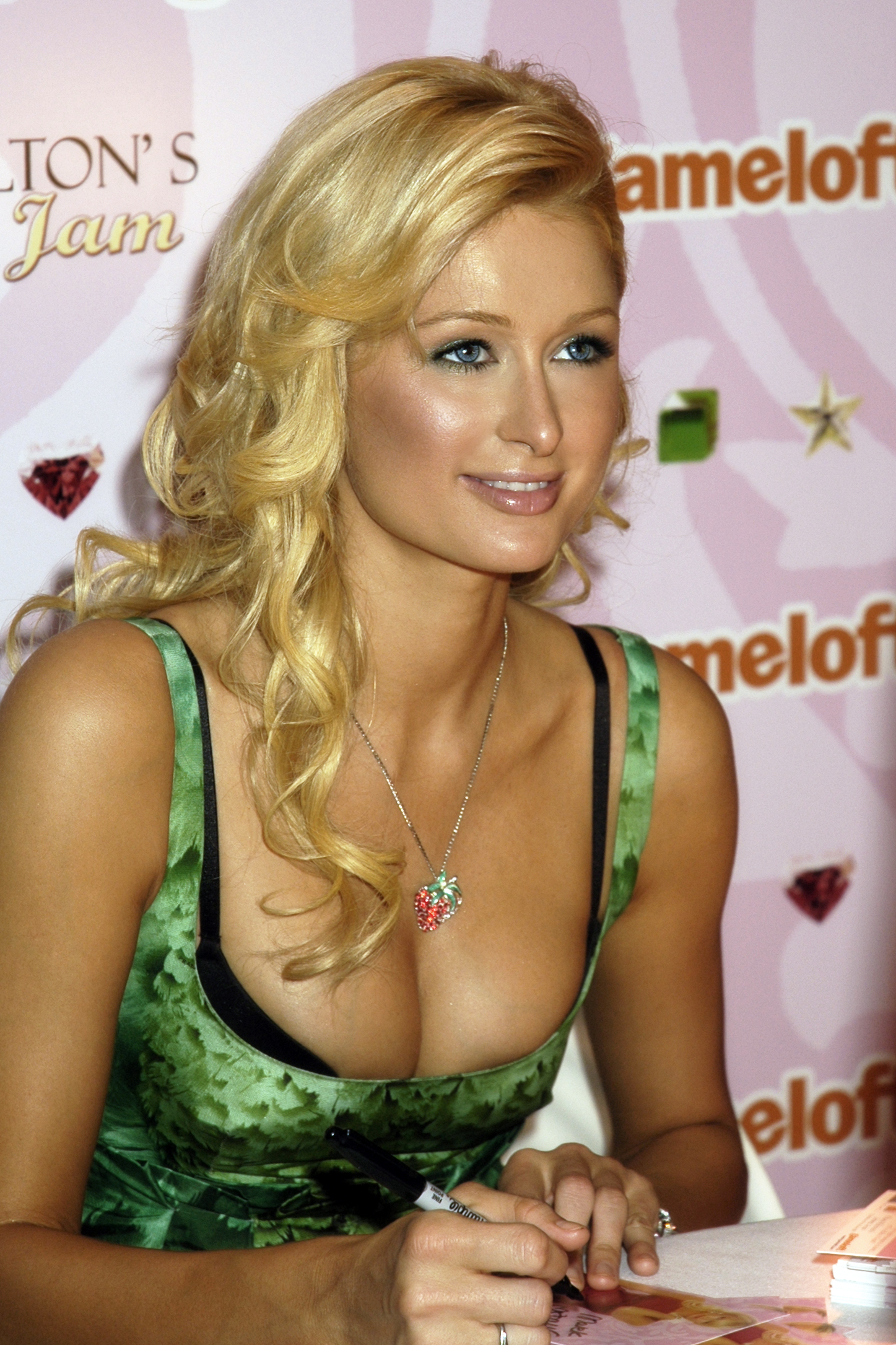
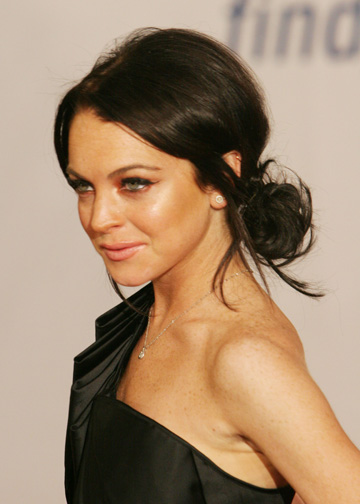
Like Mazey Day, Paris Hilton and Lindsay Lohan (pictured in 2006) were subjects of media scrutiny

Celebrity culture is a theme, like in the previous episodes "Fifteen Million Merits" and "Rachel, Jack and Ashley Too". Reviewers compared Mazey to Paris Hilton or Lindsay Lohan, subjects of immense paparazzi attention in the early 2000s. In Den of Geek, Juliette Harrisson said "ruthless paparazzi ... taking photographs of an injured or dying woman" resembled the death of Diana, Princess of Wales, which is referenced in "Loch Henry". The Independent's Louis Chilton compared the death of Caroline Flack to the celebrity suicide from Bo's photograph and media coverage.

Like "Loch Henry", the episode criticises mass media and shows characters pursuing knowledge that leads them into danger. Screen Rant's Abigail Miller thought Mazey was hunted like an animal, dehumanising her; Alan Sepinwall wrote in Rolling Stone that paparazzi culture turns everybody into animals. The Hollywood Reporter's Abbey White commented that the episode explores what it means to be a "monster". Writing in The Verge, Andrew Webster compared Bo's enticement into chasing Mazey to a heist film trope of convincing criminals into "one last job".

In Mazey's car accident, she injures a werewolf that bites her as she exits the vehicle. During the crash, a full moon is visible in the sky; police later say a human corpse was found at the scene. The audience initially believes Mazey's distress comes from guilt and addiction. The twist is foreshadowed by dialogue from Mazey's doctor and goats left in the rehab for the werewolf to consume. Mazey plays "Supermassive Black Hole" by Muse, which is prominently used in The Twilight Saga, a film series about werewolves and vampires. Though the production were aware of the connection before the episode's release, the song was not a deliberate reference.

Describing consent as a focal point, White wrote that Bo and Hector are less aggressive than the white men—Nathan and Duke—in invading subjects' privacy. Harrisson thought the police's dismissiveness of Bo could relate to race, a recurring idea in the sixth series. However, Ben Rosenstock of Vulture saw the officer's reaction as reasonable in context.

== Reception ==
On the review aggregator Rotten Tomatoes, the episode holds an approval rating of 57% based on 14 reviews. Out of five stars, the episode received two stars in Vulture, i and The Independent, three stars in Den of Geek, and five stars in The Daily Telegraph. Rosenstock, BBC Culture's Neil Armstrong and Time's Judy Berman saw it as the worst episode of the series, and Leila Jordan of Paste thought it was one of the worst in the show. Dissenting critics included The A.V. Club's Kayleigh Dray, who believed it was one of the strongest, and Den of Geek's Alec Bojalad, who found it middling.

The episode's focus on paparazzi culture was poorly received. Vanity Fair's Richard Lawson said it would have been more relevant 15 years ago, with Armstrong and The Independent's Nick Hilton concurring that the subject matter was heavy-handed and dated. Chilton wrote that the same themes were more creatively explored in the film Nightcrawler (2014). Esquire's Rachel Dodes described the moral as "trite" and i's Emily Baker said it was "already widely accepted" that a "ferocious appetite" for celebrity unhappiness was wrong. Webster opined that the episode's premise is not explored with nuance due to the episode's brevity. Of all the sixth series episodes, Sepinwall found it "most in need of extra time". In contrast, Bojalad believed it succeeds as a "cautionary tale about human nature" and saw its short runtime as a positive.

Mazey's transformation into a werewolf was also met with backlash. Rosenstock opined that it was both narratively and thematically lacking, while Sepinwall found it unintentionally funny. Harrisson criticised that supernatural elements break the "promise" established by the genre and history of the show. She said the viewer would experience "far less of a nonsensical shock" if "Demon 79" were viewed first. The New York Observer's Laura Babiak did not experience suspense or a feeling of horror during her viewing. In IGN, Samantha Nelson contrasted it with From Dusk till Dawn (1996), saying the latter had a successful tonal shift but "Mazey Day" undermines its twist "by trying to make its final moments emotionally stirring".

Some critics, however, praised the twist. Bojalad reviewed that there was "exactly the correct amount" of foreshadowing, including Mazey's driver's rivet gun and the rehab setup. Mazey's turmoil over becoming a werewolf, according to Bojalad, "plays better on a repeated viewing". Dodes praised that the ending was "so surprising and clever" as to justify deviation from Black Mirror's norms. Ed Power praised the twist as an "old-school thrill ride" in The Daily Telegraph. With ambivalent reactions, Baker said the twist was not bad but lacked inventiveness or novelty, while Webster found the last shot "fitting" but "a little on the nose".

The characters received mixed reception. Bojalad and Power praised Beetz's acting, the latter describing her as "wonderfully bare-knuckle". Power reviewed that Mazey is "sympathetically portrayed by Rugaard as a little lost party girl". However, paparazzi other than Bo were criticised: Webster found it "impossible to root for" them. Bojalad found them "properly slimy but also quite tiring". Rosenstock questioned the narrative purpose of Nathan.

=== Episode rankings ===
"Mazey Day" was ranked by critics as one of the worst of the 28 instalments of Black Mirror:

- 14th – Ed Power, The Daily Telegraph
- 16th – Amit Katwala, Matt Reynolds and James Temperton, Wired
- 23rd – James Hibbs, Radio Times
- 24th – Lucy Ford, Jack King and Brit Dawson, GQ
- 26th – James Hibberd and Christian Holub, Entertainment Weekly
- 26th – Charles Bramesco, Vulture
- 28th – Brady Langmann, Esquire

GamesRadar+ and IndieWire listed the 27 episodes, excluding Bandersnatch, where "Mazey Day" placed 18th and 26th, respectively. The New York Observer described it as the worst of the five episodes in series six. Writing for MSN Thomas West rated the episode as the worst of the entire series.
