= Metalhead (Black Mirror) =

- Black Mirror episode
- Promotional poster released as part of the "13 Days of Black Mirror"
- Episode no.: Series 4 Episode 5
- Directed by: David Slade
- Written by: Charlie Brooker
- Cinematography by: Aaron Morton
- Editing by: Tony Kearns
- Original release date: 29 December 2017
- Running time: 41 minutes

Guest appearances
- Maxine Peake as Bella; Jake Davies as Clarke; Clint Dyer as Anthony

Episode chronology
← Previous "Hang the DJ"	Next → "Black Museum"

"Metalhead" is the fifth episode of the fourth season of the anthology series Black Mirror. It was written by series creator Charlie Brooker and directed by David Slade. The episode first aired on Netflix, along with the rest of series four, on 29 December 2017.

"Metalhead" is filmed in black and white, and it follows the plight of Bella (Maxine Peake) trying to flee from robotic "dogs" after the unexplained collapse of human society. The dogs were influenced by Boston Dynamics' robots such as BigDog. Filming took place in England, with Lidar scans used for scenes from the dog's perspective. Lasting 41 minutes, "Metalhead" is the second-shortest episode behind "Mazey Day".

Reviews were mostly positive. It has been compared to The Terminator, as both works feature machines chasing humans. The episode's message has been widely debated, with reviewers discussing questions about artificial intelligence and the final shot of a box of teddy bears. The plot and short running time have received mixed reviews, while Peake's acting and Slade's directing have been praised, along with the cinematography and the design of the dogs.

== Plot ==
In a desolate landscape, Bella (Maxine Peake), Anthony (Clint Dyer), and Clarke (Jake Davies) drive to a warehouse searching for something to help ease the pain of Jack, who is dying. While Clarke hot-wires a van, Bella and Anthony break into the warehouse. They find the box they are looking for, but behind it is a four-legged robotic guard—a "dog". The dog sprays Bella and Anthony with shrapnel that contains trackers, then climbs down and shoots Anthony dead. Bella flees without the box to her car, with Clarke following in the van. The dog jumps into the van, kills Clarke and pursues Bella. It eventually enters her car, but the car teeters off a cliff when she escapes.

Bella uses pliers to extract the tracker embedded in her leg. Over her walkie-talkie, she asks someone to pass a message to her loved ones in case she is killed. Bella is chased by the dog into a forest, where she climbs a nearby tree. The dog's forelimb was damaged in the car wreck, so it cannot climb the tree, and instead powers down and waits. Bella drains it of power by repeatedly throwing sweets at it, causing it to power up and down. When the dog no longer responds, Bella climbs down. She finds a compound and breaks in.

Bella takes car keys and a shotgun from two rotting corpses in the bedroom. When the sun rises, the dog recharges and gains access to the compound. As the dog approaches, Bella leaps out and throws paint over its visual sensor, then throws the paint can to the corner of the room to distract it and hurries to the car. However, the car will not start, so she turns on the radio and hides. As the dog investigates the noise, Bella shoots it. The dog stabs her in the leg; she shoots it again and it falls to the ground. The dog releases an air-burst shell, showering Bella with tracker-embedded shrapnel.

In the bathroom mirror, Bella sees many trackers in her face. She lifts a knife, but notices a tracker in her jugular vein. Bella speaks into her walkie-talkie, unsure if she can be heard, saying goodbye to her loved ones. As she puts the knife to her throat, the camera pans out over the landscape, showing dogs approaching and investigating. In the warehouse, the box's contents—dozens of teddy bears—have spilled onto the floor.

== Production ==
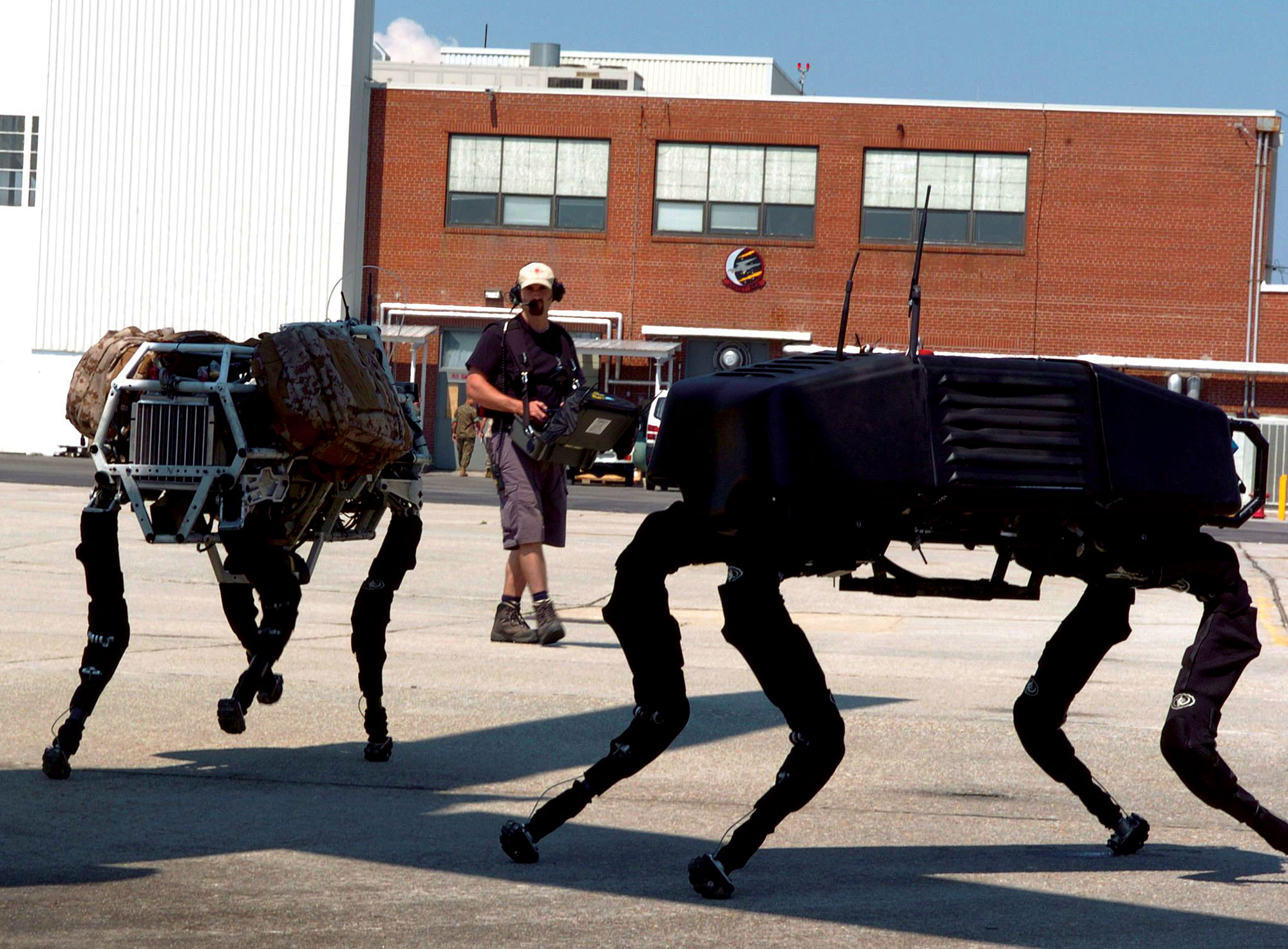
The episode was inspired by robotics products like BigDog from Boston Dynamics.

While series one and two of Black Mirror were shown on Channel 4 in the UK, Netflix commissioned the series for 12 episodes (split into two series of six episodes) in September 2015 with a bid of $40 million, and in March 2016, Netflix outbid Channel 4 for the right to distribute the series in the UK. The six episodes in series four were released on Netflix simultaneously on 29 December 2017. "Metalhead" is listed as the fifth episode, though as each episode is standalone the episodes can be watched in any order.

"Metalhead" is the second-shortest episode of Black Mirror, with a length of 41 minutes (at 40 minutes, "Mazey Day" is the shortest). The episode was written by series creator Charlie Brooker and directed by David Slade. Maxine Peake stars in the episode as Bella. Joel Collins worked as the production designer. With Al Green as music editor, the soundtrack features compositions by Krzysztof Penderecki and includes some pieces which were used in 1980 horror film The Shining.

=== Development ===
"Metalhead" was filmed in black and white, a style which had been considered for Black Mirror before but not previously used. The idea was suggested by the director David Slade to bring to mind old horror films and to match the "oppressive nature" of the episode. Brooker originally wanted the episode to be entirely free from dialogue, similar to the film All Is Lost. Brooker suggested using the Steven Spielberg films Duel and Jaws as inspiration, whilst The Texas Chain Saw Massacre was an influence for Slade. Executive producer Annabel Jones felt that the story presented a world devoid of hope, and filming "a world drained of color felt right". Slade reported that though biological events or apocalypses were considered, the episode does not suggest a backstory for the world in order to focus on the conflict between Bella and the dog.

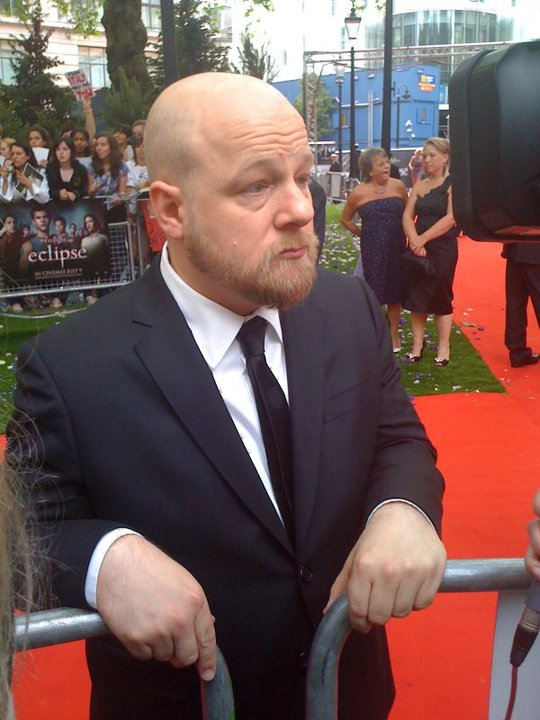
"Metalhead" was directed by David Slade.

Brooker came up with the episode's central idea while watching videos of Boston Dynamics' robotics products such as BigDog. He found that there was something "creepy" in how the products, if knocked over, would look helpless as they worked to regain their stance. Brooker captured this idea in the scene where the dog breaks through the van's back window, but ends up off its legs. The dogs have "enough artificial intelligence to problem solve", according to Slade, and they have no feelings, in contrast to many robots in fiction. Their design underwent many iterations, the aim being that it should look terrifying, be designed with functionality in mind and kill brutally.

Brooker's original script featured a human operating the dog from his home, including a scene where the operator left the "control unit" to give his kids a bath. However, this felt "superfluous", so the intention became for the episode to tell "a very simple story" and hence Brooker pared back the plot. Though viewers may assume the dogs are security for the warehouse, where they are first seen, the intention was for the dogs to have been deployed during a war. Camouflage for the dogs was designed but not used. One physical model of a dog was created for the episode, to help give actors and production a concept of their size and shape, but otherwise, all dogs were digitally added in post-production. Visual effects company DNEG were hired to work on this.

=== Filming ===
Slade initially received the script in June 2016, while finishing work on the first series of American Gods. He was involved in Peake's casting, and had a large amount of autonomy during filming. Extensive location scouting was carried out, with Slade looking for "incredibly soft and overcast" light and "desolation". The 12-day shoot took place in England, largely in Devon and around London. With minimal dialogue in the episode, Slade noted that scenes were divided into many brief shots, as scenes utilising green screens would be difficult for Peake.

Filming took place on two monochrome cameras, not many of which existed at the time. In the scenes with Bella in a car, a remote driver controlled steering from a pod on top of the car. This allowed Peake to act fearfully with more realism. At one point, a dog jumps through a van window and shoots the driver. This sequence was achieved by filming the glass being broken for real, then adding the dog and additional broken glass in post-production.

Real Lidar scans were used to create the scenes shown from the dog's perspective. Collins came up with the idea that in the scene where the dog escapes the car wreckage, the release of its limb would be similar to the action of a drill chuck. Collins noted that the dog is "almost humanized" by its movement and damaged arm and compared the dog's multifaceted limbs to Pin Art.

The final scene shows a case full of teddy bears, which were yellow in real life but appear white in the episode. Brooker originally considered a gadget such as a Game Boy instead of a teddy bear, but Slade insisted on "something that you can touch, that you would hold to you, that would give you comfort". The teddy bears were intended by Slade to be the only "soft and comforting" element of the story.

=== Marketing ===
External videos
- Black Mirror - Metalhead; The trailer for "Metalhead".
- Black Mirror - Featurette: Metalhead; Brief commentary by Charlie Brooker and Maxine Peake.

In May 2017, a Reddit post unofficially announced the names and directors of the six episodes in series 4 of Black Mirror. The first trailer for the series was released by Netflix on 25 August 2017, and it contained the six episode titles. In October 2017, Jones revealed that "Metalhead" was filmed in black and white.

Beginning on 24 November 2017, Netflix published a series of posters and trailers for the fourth series of the show, referred to as the "13 Days of Black Mirror". The poster for "Metalhead" was released on 2 December, and the episode's trailer was released on 3 December. The trailer led one commentator to speculate that the episode could be the show's "most disturbing episode yet", with another saying the trailer was "enigmatic". The following day, Netflix published a trailer featuring an amalgamation of scenes from the fourth series, which announced that the series would be released on 29 December.

== Analysis ==
"Metalhead" has been described as genre fiction and low concept. Its tone is one of hopelessness. The episode is "pared-down and gimmick-free" and has "the most minimal plot in the series". The Ringer's Alison Herman wrote that it is the only episode that cannot be read as an allegory. Jacob Stolworthy of The Independent suggested that it is the scariest episode of Black Mirror, while The Verge's Bryan Bishop and his wife were "literally squirming" while watching. However, The Atlantic reviewer David Sims commented that it has little gore when compared with other one-person survival fiction.

=== Comparisons ===
The episode has widely been described as a simplified version of The Terminator, a 1984 film which—similar to "Metalhead"—is "about a human run ragged by an android's unceasing pursuit". It has also been compared to the "adrenaline highs" of Mad Max: Fury Road, a 2015 post-apocalyptic film which director George Miller wanted to shoot in black and white. Comparisons have also been drawn with the 2016 Anohni album Hopelessness, which "effectively communicates the cold horrors of drone warfare", and the Philip K. Dick short story "Second Variety". Scott Huver of Variety noted that the episode is one of several monochrome works produced around the same time, with others including FX anthology series Feud, and "Gotta Light?" from the 2017 revival of Twin Peaks. Tim Surette of TV Guide compared the episode's horror to past Black Mirror episodes "Playtest" and "White Bear".

"Metalhead" contains several Easter eggs—small details which refer to other Black Mirror episodes. A postcard and the letters "TCKR" on a truck refer to "San Junipero", while "Callister" appears on a computer screen in allusion to "USS Callister". When Clarke hijacks a van at the beginning of the episode, text on the car screen refers to previous episodes, as well as containing the message "WHY. did. you. bother. PAUSING. this. you. freak". The white teddy bears at the end of the episode have been read as a reference to "White Bear".

=== Themes ===
The episode can be seen to explore the AI control problem: Ed Cumming of The Telegraph questioned how one could "set limits on [the] ruthlessness" of a robotic guard dog. While watching the episode, Nick Harley of Den of Geek questioned whether the dogs were self-aware. Another Den of Geek critic, Ryan Lambie, believed the dogs are not artificial intelligence, as their "lack of empathy or emotional nuance" is suggestive of "cold, pre-programmed logic". Cultfix's Ryan Monty described the episode as a "pressing statement" on autonomous AI and drone warfare. Bishop commented that "Metalhead" may have been conceived with Amazon in mind, particularly its use of drones to carry packages. Before reaching the final twist, Harley suggested the episode could have been about health care in a world where medication is government-controlled and guarded by AI.

Slade has stated that if there is a theme, it is "how important it is to hold onto our humanity". Commenting on the teddy bears, Emily VanDerWerff said in Vox that the message may be that humans are "ruthless in some contexts and quite stupid and soft in others". According to Scott Beggs of Nerdist, the episode implies "toys and art are just as vital to survival as the other stuff at the bottom of Maslow's hierarchy". Digital Spy's Steve O'Brien thought the moral is that "there's still room for a tender gesture" in the post-apocalyptic world. Bishop believed the story is about the "loss of human innocence" as a sacrifice for progress. Monty said the episode was about the triumph of "cold, calculated machine effectiveness" over human nature.

Reviewers have commented on early dialogue in the car, when Bella, Anthony and Clarke pass some pigsties. Bishop believed it is a metaphor for economic inequality. VanDerWerff suggested the scene evokes predator and prey imagery, comparing it to George Orwell's dystopia Animal Farm.

== Reception ==
The episode has received mostly positive reviews. On Rotten Tomatoes, the episode has a score of 69% based on 26 reviews. The website's critics consensus reads: "Though 'Metalhead' is the show's shortest installment, the bleakness of its plot and spareness of its thrills can often make it feel longer – though some may appreciate its claustrophobic beauty." A Cultfix review gave the episode a score of eight out of ten. The episode received four out of five stars in Den of Geek and three out of five stars in The Telegraph. A reviewer for The A.V. Club gave the episode a B+ rating. Stolworthy believed "Metalhead" is in the "upper echelons" of Black Mirror episodes, while Adam Starkey of Metro summarised it as "an interesting experiment and welcome palette cleanser", though far from the best episode. Beggs called the episode "gorgeous but incredibly dull".

Reviewers have widely commented on the episode's 41-minute running time. Sims praised the storyline as "taut", writing that it didn't "waste a moment". Stolworthy said the "relentless" plot makes the episode "feel like the longest" rather than the shortest Black Mirror episode, and Monty believed its runtime makes it "one of the most effective and skin-crawling" episodes. Bishop commented that it would have been "untenable" to make the episode longer and Starkey called the episode's length a "relief" rather than a "detriment". However, Cumming believed the episode's themes are not enough to sustain it for its running time.

The episode's minimalism was praised by Zack Handlen of The A.V. Club for its "clear and immediate stakes" and threat which keeps the viewers interested. However, Handlen also claimed that the episode is limited by its simplicity, and VanDerWerff criticised it as "exactly the wrong balance between too much information and too little". Paste's Jacob Oller said that the episode "meanders", and criticised the plot devices as unoriginal.

Stolworthy praised Peake's acting, saying that it "elevates" the episode and increases the viewer's fear of the dog. Harley praised her performance for allowing the audience to empathise with her character immediately. Harley also complimented the poignancy of Bella's final scene. Monty said that "Peake showcases the absolute best of her abilities", playing a character who is "fittingly human and emphatic in her will to survive". Handlen praised her as "easy to root for", saying that Peake "does a good job of finding new ways to be terrified, angry, triumphant, and depressed". Cumming wrote that the actor is "never hard to watch" but only has the chance to express degrees of terror.

Bishop commented on the quick pace and wrote that the dog appears "utterly grounded in reality". Sims praised that "every glimpse of the empty moors in high-contrast black-and-white photography jumps out at the viewer", while Lambie commented positively on the ending's final landscape shots. Harley noted the sparse use of music to create a feeling of dread. Monty lauded the lack of exposition in the episode, believing it is the "strongest aspect" as the audience can make individual inferences about the backstory. However, Beggs criticised that the lack of exposition makes it difficult to empathise with Bella.

The ending of "Metalhead" reveals that the warehouse box contained teddy bears. Lambie suggested this is "bleak humour" from Brooker, and another example of the show's exploration of the worst outcomes of new technology. Beggs said the ending was paradoxically both "face-slappingly cheap" and "an outstanding, deeply humane subversion" of apocalypse films. Harley criticised the ending as laughable and not profound. Sims criticised it as "perhaps a little too cute" and VanDerWerff called it "nonsensical", going on to write that it "lands somewhere between affectionate exasperation for humanity's foibles and a sick joke". Starkey wrote that the viewer anticipates a revelation about the world or conflict which never comes.

The dog's design has been praised: Cumming called it "horribly believable". Lambie called the dog's first appearance in the warehouse a "superb introduction", and praised the "spiteful and unpredictable" weapons used by the dog. Handlen was impressed by the special effects team's dramatisation of "what is essentially a box on legs", commending the "creepily real" design of the dog. Contrastingly, Oller found the dog's design and animation simplistic, commenting that it is "not the imposing, minimalist murder machine it needs to be". Oller found that the monochrome gave the scenery an "especially unreal sheen".

=== Episode rankings ===
"Metalhead" appeared on many critics' rankings of the 19 episodes in Black Mirror, from best to worst:

- 3rd – Matt Donnelly and Tim Molloy, TheWrap
- 6th – James Hibberd, Entertainment Weekly
- 8th – Steve Greene, Hanh Nguyen and Liz Shannon Miller, IndieWire
- 8th – Charles Bramesco, Vulture
- 10th – Eric Anthony Glover, Entertainment Tonight
- 10th – Corey Atad, Esquire
- 11th – Morgan Jeffery, Digital Spy
- 14th – Travis Clark, Business Insider
- 21st – Aubrey Page, Collider

Instead of by quality, Proma Khosla of Mashable ranked the episodes by tone, concluding that "Metalhead" is the 12th-most pessimistic episode of the show.

Other critics ranked "Metalhead" against the other five episodes in series four:

- 3rd – Christopher Hooton, Jacob Stolworthy, The Independent
- 5th (grade: C−) – TVLine

=== Awards ===
"Metalhead" has won a BAFTA Craft Award, and was nominated for a Visual Effects Society Award:

Awards and nominations received by "Metalhead"
Year	Award	Category	Recipients	Result	Ref.
2018	British Academy Television Craft Awards	Special, Visual Effects & Graphics	Dneg TV, Jean-clement Soret, Russell McLean, Joel Collins	Won	
2018	Visual Effects Society Awards	Outstanding Animated Character in an Episode or Real-Time Project	Steven Godfrey, Stafford Lawrence, Andrew Robertson, Lestyn Roberts	Nominated	
