= Nick Holder =

- Born: David Nakitta Holder; 1968 (age 57–58)
- Origin: Toronto, Ontario
- Genres: House, hip-hop
- Years active: 1980s-present
- Labels: DNH Records, Studio !K7, Treehouse Records, Poker flat recordings
- Website: http://www.myspace.com/mrnickholder

Nick Holder (born 1968) is an underground hip-hop and house music DJ and producer from Toronto, Ontario.

Holder began DJing in the early 1980s, and soon became influenced by the Detroit techno scene and DJs such as Derrick May and Carl Craig. He has been producing music since 1991, owning both DNH Records, a house record label, and Treehouse Records, a hip-hop record label. In this period he has produced over 60 records. He has also produced music for labels like Studio !K7 (where he produced 2 albums, One Night In The Disco and Still On Track), Jinxx Records, Poker Flat Recordings, Stickman Records, Ministry of Sound, Peppermint Jam, Definitive Recordings, and NRK Sound Division.

Holder's recording work spans house sounds through to disco loops and minimal Chicago style. Holder's single "Da Sambafrique" propelled him to cult producer status, a Latin track played by DJs all over the world. This record set the precedent for Holder's critically acclaimed album From Within and spawned two underground classics; Trying To Find Myself and I Once Believed In U.

== Discography ==
=== Albums ===
- One Night in the Disco (1997) Studio !K7
- Still On Track (1998) Studio !K7
- From Within (1999) NRK recordings
- Underground Alternatives (2000) NRK recordings
- Deep in the Underground: 1994-2000 (2001) Hot JWP
- The Other Side (2003) NRK recordings
- The Other Mixes (2004) NRK recordings
- Other Mixes & The Other Side (2005) Open/Mosr
- Nrk Singles Vol.9: Mixed By Nick Holder (2008) NRK recordings
- Black Jazz (2008) DNH Records

Holder has also contributed to numerous compilation albums, including Latin House, and contributed eight of the thirteen tracks on the 1997 Best of DNH retrospective.

=== Singles ===
- "Don't Go Away" (1996) Studio !K7
- "Da Sambafrique" (1999) Studio !K7
- Trying To Find Myself: Remixes (1999)
- Hustlers Vol 2 (2000)
- Alternative Remixes Vol.1 (2001) NRK Recordings
- Alternative Mixes vol. 2 (2001) NRK Recordings
- "Summer Daze" (2001)
- On My Mind: Ian Pooley Mixes (2003) NRK Recordings
- The Other Mixes vol. 2 (2004)
- No More Dating DJ's (2004) NRK Recordings
- Erotic Illusions of a Totnes G EP (2006) Poker Flat Recordings
- "Sometimes I'm Blue" Studio !K7
- "Time I Spent in Torbay" (2008) NRK feat. Sasha
