= Bisha K. Ali =

British stand-up comedian and screenwriter

- Born: Bisha Kanval Ali; 17 March 1989 (age 36); Hounslow, Greater London, England
- Occupations: Stand-up comedian, screenwriter
- Notable work: Four Weddings and a Funeral; Loki; Ms. Marvel

Bisha Kanval Ali (born 17 March 1989) is a British stand-up comedian and screenwriter. She is the head writer on the Disney+ series Ms. Marvel (2022) and won the BAFTA Award for Best Writer: Drama for co-writing "Demon 79" (2023), the fifth episode of season six of Black Mirror, with Charlie Brooker.

== Early life ==
Bisha Kanval Ali was born in Hounslow, West London to Pakistani parents.

== Career ==
Ali worked as a data scientist and then a domestic violence support worker, before moving to a career in stand-up comedy under the name Bisha Kanval Ali. In 2012, she participated in the Royal Court Theatre's Young Writers programme. Her script Book Club, for a Sky diversity initiative, was optioned by Tiger Aspect Productions. She later wrote additional material for the series Sex Education.

Her first major scriptwriting role was for the 2019 miniseries Four Weddings and a Funeral, working with Mindy Kaling. In 2019, she was announced as head writer for the upcoming streaming television series Ms. Marvel for Disney+. She also was a writer on the fellow Marvel Studios series Loki.

Ali has written for The Huffington Post, and co-presented The Guilty Feminist podcast with Deborah Frances-White and GrownUpLand for BBC Radio 4.

== Filmography ==
Year	Title	Credited as		Notes
Year	Title	Writer	Producer	Notes
2019	Sex Education	No	No	Additional material
2019	Four Weddings and a Funeral	Yes	No	Episode: "Game Night"
2021	Loki	Yes	No	Episode: "Lamentis", also executive story editor and story editor
2022	The Baby	No	Yes	Consulting producer
2022	Ms. Marvel	Yes	Executive	Head writer (one episode), Disney+ miniseries
2023–25	Black Mirror	Yes	Executive	Co-wrote "Demon 79", "Common People", "USS Callister: Into Infinity"
TBA	Century Goddess	Yes	No	Writer
