= James Hibberd (writer) =

American journalist and screenwriter

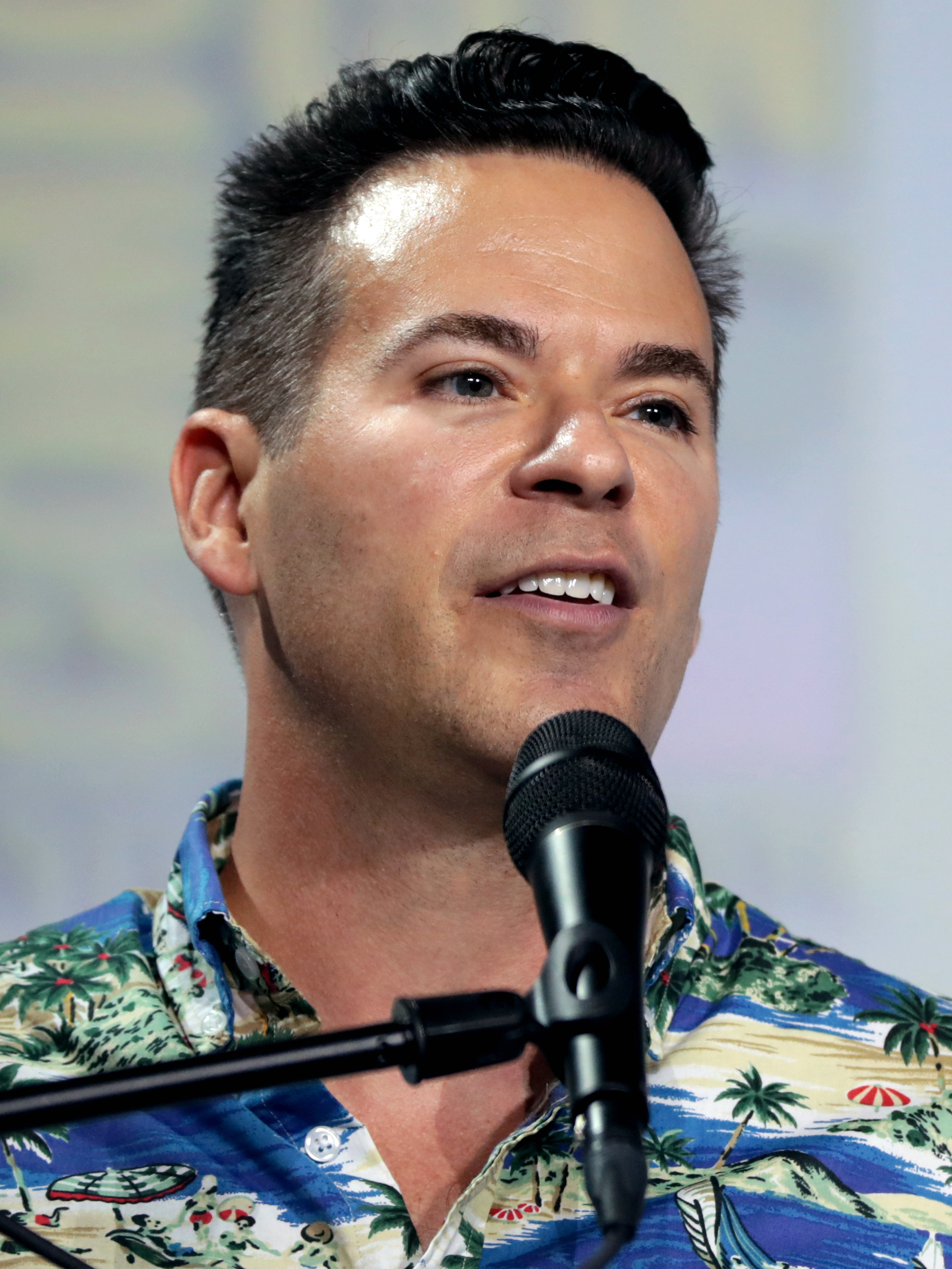
- Hibberd at the 2019 San Diego Comic-Con
- Education: University of Texas
- Occupations: Writer, Journalist

James Hibberd is an American journalist and screenwriter. He is a current writer at large for The Hollywood Reporter, having previously worked at the magazine from 2008 to 2010 as a television editor. Before his return to The Hollywood Reporter, he worked at Entertainment Weekly until 2021. His work has been published in publications including The New York Times, Salon, Details, Cosmopolitan, and Amnesty International Magazine.

== Career ==
Hibberd is a graduate of the University of Texas journalism program. He worked at the Austin American-Statesman and later moved to Phoenix, Arizona, and worked as a staff writer for the Phoenix New Times.

In 2001, while a writer at the Phoenix New Times, Hibberd conducted an interview with an active serial eco-arsonist who had not yet been captured by police. After the interview Hibberd declined to assist in the investigation, and refused to turn over any of his interview notes or other materials to investigators despite being subpoenaed to do so. Some criticized Hibberd’s decision, including The Arizona Republic and the mayor of Phoenix, who accused him of assisting the arsonist. A judge ruled that Hibberd was not legally obligated to hand over any material to police as the arsonist was a protected source. The arsonist was later apprehended.

From 2003 to 2008 he worked for TelevisionWeek, becoming senior editor. In 2008 Hibberd joined The Hollywood Reporter as a senior television reporter, and went on to become the television editor. From 2010 to 2021, he was at Entertainment Weekly, as an editor at large, before returning to The Hollywood Reporter in March 2021 as a writer at large.

Hibberd co-wrote the screenplay Waco with Rupert Wainwright about the Waco siege, after spending a year researching the story. Hibberd wrote the screenplay to the film Tell Me How I Die which was released in 2016 to mixed reviews.
