= Lenora Crichlow =

English actress (born 1985)

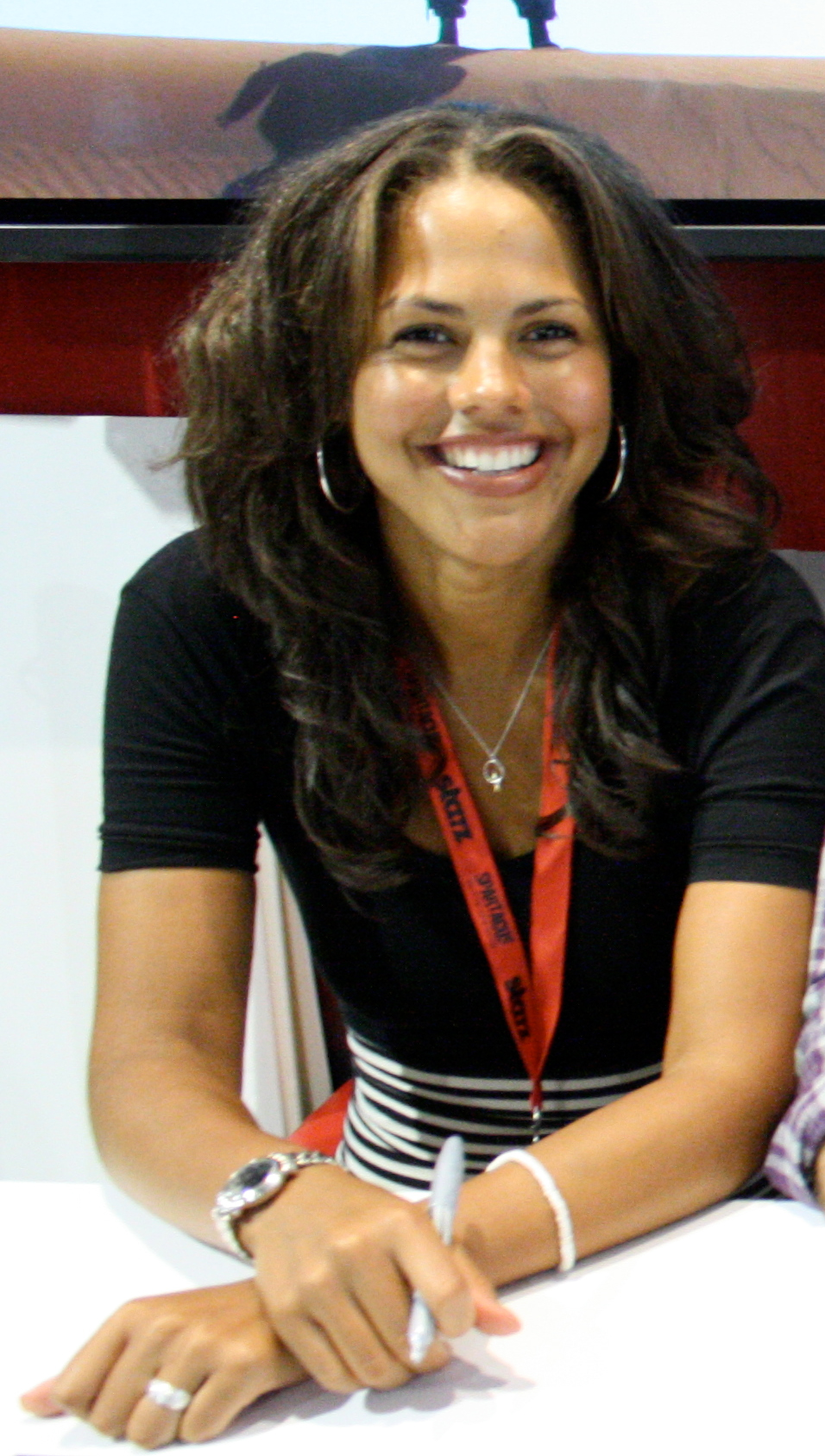
- Crichlow in 2009
- Born: Lenora Isabella Addington Crichlow; 4 January 1985 (age 41); London, England
- Occupation: Actress
- Years active: 2004–present
- Father: Frank Crichlow

Lenora Isabella Addington Crichlow (born 4 January 1985) is an English actress. She became known for her starring roles as Maria "Sugar" Sweet in the Channel 4 comedy-drama series Sugar Rush, Annie Sawyer in the BBC Three supernatural drama series Being Human, and Shania Andrews in the 2012 sports drama film Fast Girls. In 2013, Crichlow portrayed Chen Sam in the television film Burton & Taylor and Victoria Skillane in the episode "White Bear" of the dystopian sci-fi series Black Mirror. She has since had regular roles in the ABC sitcom Back in the Game and the NBC comedy series A to Z. In 2020, she was in the main cast of the HBO/Sky One comedy series Avenue 5, playing second engineer Billie McEvoy.

== Early life ==
Crichlow was born 4 January 1985 and raised in Harlesden, London. She is one of four siblings born to a biracial couple, Port of Spain, Trinidad-born Frank Crichlow and his partner, Lucy Addington, a white Englishwoman, granddaughter of the 6th Viscount Sidmouth. Frank Crichlow owned the Mangrove restaurant in Notting Hill, which was frequented by stars such as Jimi Hendrix and Vanessa Redgrave. Crichlow has two sisters and a brother.

From the age of twelve, Crichlow trained and worked with the YoungBlood Theatre Company in Hammersmith, West London.

== Career ==
Crichlow's first professional acting role came when she was cast alongside Billie Piper in the television film Bella and the Boys. She made her first feature film appearance in the low-budget horror film Wilderness, released in 2006, and her first television appearance in the ITV police drama series The Bill. Crichlow came to public prominence starring as Maria "Sugar" Sweet in Channel 4's adaptation of the Julie Burchill novel Sugar Rush, which won the 2006 International Emmy Award in the Children And Young People category.

In 2007, she appeared in the Doctor Who episode "Gridlock", guest starring as Cheen. Crichlow then had a role in BBC One's feature-length drama Kiss of Death in 2008, starring alongside Danny Dyer. In March 2010, Crichlow returned to the world of Doctor Who in the audio release of The Architects of History, playing a new character, Rachel Cooper, a companion of the Seventh Doctor in an alternate timeline. Crichlow then played the role of Portia in a performance of William Shakespeare's The Merchant of Venice, for the BBC's educational platform Bitesize.

In November 2008, the BBC announced Crichlow had been cast as Annie Sawyer, a ghost in a flat shared with a vampire and a werewolf, in the BBC Three series Being Human, replacing Andrea Riseborough who had played the character in the pilot. In 2011, Crichlow won the TV Actress of the Year Award at the annual Glamour Awards for her work on the show. She continued to play the role of Annie in the programme until deciding to depart following the last episode of the fourth series, which aired in March 2012. Crichlow later narrated the audiobook of Simon Guerrier's tie-in novel The Road.

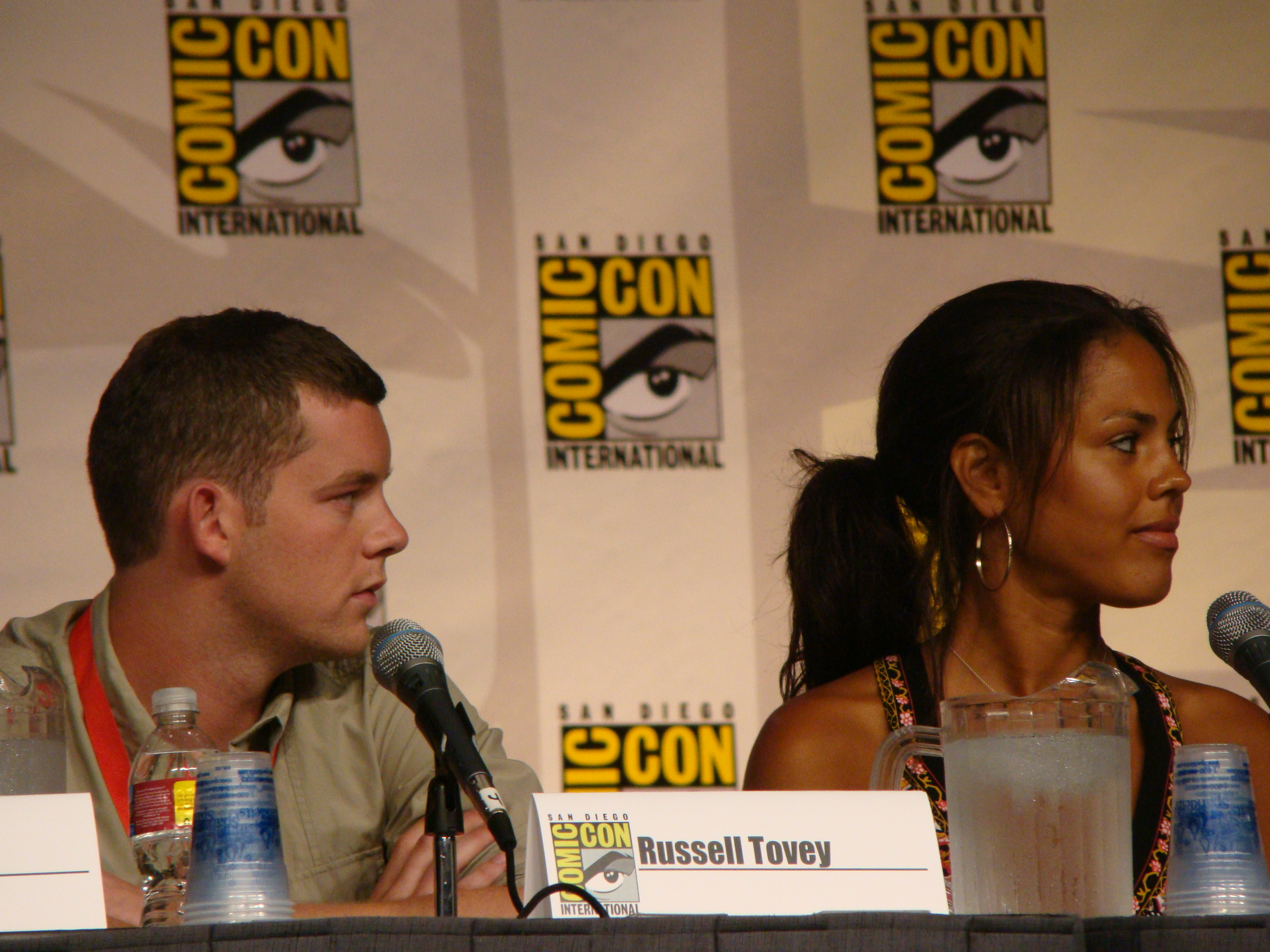
Crichlow alongside Being Human co-star Russell Tovey at San Diego Comic-Con in 2009

In November 2009, Crichlow played the part of Alice Jackson in Collision, an ITV1 drama which ran over five consecutive nights. From January to February 2010, Crichlow appeared as aspiring fashion designer Ali Redcliffe in the BBC One romantic comedy miniseries Material Girl. In June 2010, she also played the role of Ashley in a BBC Three pilot, Dappers. That same month, Crichlow presented Nelson Mandela: One Incredible Life on BBC Three. For the documentary, Crichlow travelled to South Africa to learn more about Nelson Mandela's story. In 2011, Crichlow played the character of Police Sergeant Lily Thomson in the BBC drama Death in Paradise.

In January 2011, Crichlow appeared in six short accompaniments for The Tudors airings on BBC America. Crichlow also narrated The Gatwick Baby: Abandoned at Birth, shown on BBC Three on 13 April 2011. The following year, she appeared in an episode of Inspector George Gently, and played the central role of Shania Andrews, a streetwise 200m runner, in the Olympics-themed drama film Fast Girls. In December 2012, she starred as Laura Stanton in the ITV1 drama film Doors Open, an adaptation of the Ian Rankin novel of the same name.

In February 2013, Crichlow starred as Victoria Skillane in "White Bear", the second episode in the second series of Charlie Brooker's critically acclaimed anthology series Black Mirror. The following month, it was announced that she had landed a main role in the American sitcom Back in the Game for the ABC network, starring alongside James Caan and Maggie Lawson. In July 2013, Crichlow portrayed the role of Chen Sam in the BBC Four television film Burton & Taylor, alongside Helena Bonham Carter and Dominic West.

In 2014, she portrayed Mel in the independent drama film Electricity, starring opposite Agyness Deyn and Christian Cooke. In February 2014, it was announced that Crichlow had been cast as Stephie Bennett in the NBC comedy series A to Z. The series was given a full season order, but was ultimately cancelled. She next appeared in the Kevin Pollak-directed comedy-drama The Late Bloomer, alongside J. K. Simmons, Brittany Snow, and Johnny Simmons. Crichlow was then cast as Dina Clark in the ABC procedural crime drama series Deception, alongside Jack Cutmore-Scott and Amaury Nolasco.

Since 2024, Crichlow is one of the Station Voiceovers on BBC Radio 3 Unwind.

== Filmography ==
=== Film ===
Year	Title	Role	Notes
2006	Wilderness	Mandy	
2007	The Beloved Ones	Maureen	Short film
2012	Fast Girls	Shania Andrews	
2014	Electricity	Mel	
2016	The Late Bloomer	Nikki	
2020	The Big Ugly	Fiona, Neelyn's girlfriend	
2021	Horror Noire	Mrs. Clay	

=== Television ===
Year	Title	Role	Notes
2004	Bella and the Boys	Stacy	Television film
2004	The Bill	Shirley Moss	12 episodes
2005	Casualty	Linda Surrey	Episode: "Truth, Lies and Videotape"
2005–2006	Sugar Rush	Maria "Sugar" Sweet	20 episodes
2007	Doctor Who	Cheen	Episode: "Gridlock"
2008	Kiss of Death	Jude Whiley	Television film
2008	The Things I Haven't Told You	Miss Baker	Television film
2008	Casualty	Michelle	Episode: "There and Back Again"
2009–2012	Being Human	Annie Sawyer	30 episodes
2009	Collision	Alice Jackson	Miniseries; 3 episodes
2010	Material Girl	Ali Redcliffe	Miniseries; 6 episodes
2010	Dappers	Ashley	Unsold pilot
2011	Death in Paradise	Lily Thomson	Episode: "Arriving in Paradise"
2012	Inspector George Gently	Carol Morford	Episode: "Gently Northern Soul"
2012	Doors Open	Laura Stanton	Television film
2013	Burton & Taylor	Chen Sam	Television film
2013	Black Mirror	Victoria Skillane	Episode: "White Bear"
2013–2014	Back in the Game	Gigi Fernandez-Lovette	12 episodes
2014–2015	A to Z	Stephie Bennett	13 episodes
2016	Suspects	DS Alicia Brooks	6 episodes
2017	Flaked	Rosa	5 episodes
2018	Deception	Dina Clark	13 episodes
2020–2022	Avenue 5	Billie McEvoy	Main cast
2021	Goliath	Ava Wallace-Margolis	Main cast
2024	Bel-Air	Penelope	Recurring
2026	S.W.A.T. Exiles	Commander Angela Pike	Main cast

== Other work ==
=== Theatre ===
Year	Title	Role	Location
2006	93.2 FM	Delisha Taylor	Royal Court Theatre
2008	Big White Fog	Claudine Adams	Almeida Theatre

=== Radio ===
Year	Title	Role	Station	Notes
2010	Doctor Who: The Architects of History	Rachel Cooper	BBC Radio 4 Extra	4 episodes

== Awards and nominations ==
Year	Award	Category	Work	Result
2011	Glamour Awards	TV Actress of the Year	Being Human	Won
2012	Screen Nation Film and Television Awards	Female Performance in Film	Fast Girls	Nominated
2013	SFX Awards	Best Actress	Being Human	Nominated
2013	SFX Awards	Sexiest Female	Being Human	Nominated
2014	Screen Nation Film and Television Awards	Female Performance in TV	Black Mirror, Back in the Game, and Burton & Taylor	Nominated
