= Black Mirror =

British anthology television series

- Genre: Anthology; Speculative fiction; Science fiction; Drama; Dystopia
- Created by: Charlie Brooker
- Country of origin: United Kingdom
- Original language: English
- No. of series: 7
- No. of episodes: 33 + film (list of episodes)

Production
- Executive producers: Annabel Jones; Charlie Brooker; Jessica Rhoades; Bisha K. Ali
- Running time: 40–90 minutes
- Production companies: Zeppotron; House of Tomorrow; Broke & Bones

Original release
- Network: Channel 4
- Release: 4 December 2011 – 16 December 2014
- Network: Netflix
- Release: 21 October 2016 – present

Black Mirror is a British anthology television series created by Charlie Brooker. Most episodes are speculative fiction, set in near-future dystopias containing sci-fi technology. The series is inspired by The Twilight Zone and uses the themes of technology and media to comment on contemporary social issues. Most episodes are written by Brooker with involvement by the executive producer Annabel Jones.

There are 33 episodes in seven series and one special, in addition to the interactive film Black Mirror: Bandersnatch (2018). The first two series aired on the British network Channel 4 in 2011 and 2013, as did the 2014 special "White Christmas". The programme then moved to Netflix, where five further series aired in 2016, 2017, 2019, 2023, and 2025. An eighth series is in development. Two related webisode series were produced by Netflix, and a companion book to the first four series, Inside Black Mirror, was published in 2018. Soundtracks to many episodes have been released as albums.

Black Mirror is considered by some reviewers to be one of the best television series of the 2010s, while some critics have found the formulaic morality themes of the series obvious or have cited declining quality. The programme won the Primetime Emmy Award for Outstanding Television Movie three times consecutively for "San Junipero", "USS Callister" and Bandersnatch. Black Mirror, along with American Horror Story and Inside No. 9, has been credited with reviving the anthology television format and a number of episodes have been deemed prescient by the media.

== Premise and production ==
=== Development and writing ===
The "black mirror" of the title is the one you'll find on every wall, on every desk, in the palm of every hand: the cold, shiny screen of a TV, a monitor, a smartphone.

— Charlie Brooker, The Guardian

The series was created by Brooker, who was previously known as a comedy writer. He wrote video game reviews for PC Zone in the late 1990s and began writing television reviews for The Guardian and working in television in the 2000s. Brooker had completed production of Dead Set (2008), a zombie-based drama series, and while working on Newswipe (2009–2010) and other programmes, decided to make an anthology drama series. It was modelled in the style of The Twilight Zone (1959–1964), Tales of the Unexpected (1979–1988) and Hammer House of Horror (1980). The title was inspired by the Arcade Fire song of the same name, with Brooker using it to refer to the empty screen of an electronic device once it is turned off.

Brooker recognised that Rod Serling had based The Twilight Zone on contemporary issues, often controversial ones such as racism, but placed them in fictional settings to get around television censors at the time. Brooker realised he could comment similarly on modern issues, specifically focusing on technology, a topic he explored in producing the series How TV Ruined Your Life (2011). He aimed to explore "the way we might be living in 10 minutes' time".

Brooker wanted to keep the anthology approach, using new stories, settings, characters, and actors for each episode, as he felt this was a key element of enjoying series like The Twilight Zone. This approach would allow Black Mirror to contrast with current dramas and serials that had a standard recurring cast. According to Brooker, the production team considered giving the series a linking theme or presenter, but ultimately decided not to.

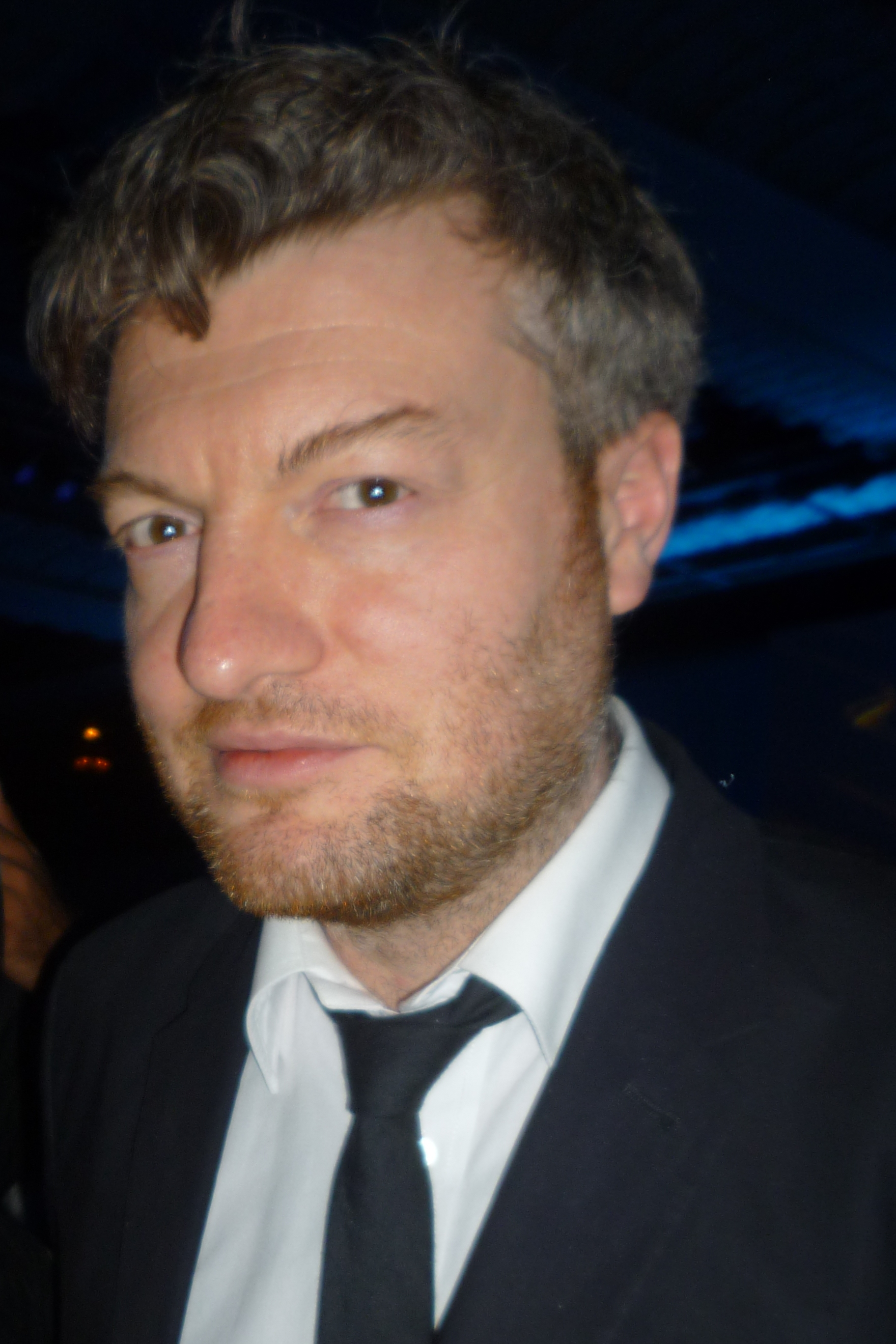
Series creator Charlie Brooker wrote the majority of episodes.

Most episodes are credited solely to Brooker. Many originate with him talking to the executive producer Annabel Jones or others about a "what-if idea", and considering if it could be the consequence of some new technology. Brooker said that like his previous comedy writing, the premise is a "worst case scenario compounded"; the ideas often make him laugh. Episodes generally have only one aspect at a time that requires suspension of disbelief, and characters' actions are designed to feel authentic even if their predicaments are unusual. Brooker avoided reacting to news events or topical subjects, as there was no guarantee of their continued relevance by the release date.

In the first two series, Brooker would plan less and write the script as he went along, which led to more dropped subplots and several iterations of rewriting "White Bear" in particular. He would write with advertisement breaks in mind, as motivation to reach the next break, and so that he could insert some cliffhanger to make the audience return. After the first two series, Brooker wrote a full outline preceding each first draft, finding that picturing an ending made the process easier even if the ending later changed. The outline could vary substantially in length, from two to twenty-five pages.

"San Junipero" was the first episode written for Netflix and came from a conscious decision to experiment with the tone of a Black Mirror episode. Following this, episodes became more tonally diverse. Brooker would send a brief treatment to Netflix and receive feedback before beginning the first draft. He wrote some material while standing up, as the slight discomfort discouraged time-wasting; he said that the first draft, the "vomit draft", was always terrible, but had to be written. He tried to picture the finished episode while writing and sometimes ran while listening to music as a source of inspiration. Brooker said that emotional speeches were easier to write, while sequences with many parts were harder.

Feedback that came from Jones and a director or cast member could have a large influence on the script. Brooker and Jones were involved in all aspects of production process, observing the filming and participating in the editing room where possible. They pointed out logical inconsistencies and worked on the details of technological user interfaces. Brooker said that the final edit could allow aspects that were not working to be fixed, or for introduction of overlooked ideas.

The episode "The Entire History of You" was written by Jesse Armstrong. William Bridges is co-credited on both "Shut Up and Dance" and "USS Callister" and Brooker's wife Konnie Huq received a co-credit on "Fifteen Million Merits". For these episodes, Brooker did not write in the same room as his colleagues. One person would write the first draft and they would then iterate between feedback and re-writing. On "Nosedive", Michael Schur wrote the first half of the script and Rashida Jones wrote the second half, based on ideas and a story outline from Brooker. "Demon 79" was co-written by Brooker and Bisha K. Ali.

=== Genre and themes ===
As Black Mirror is an anthology series, each episode is standalone and can be watched in any order, although some episodes may contain references and easter eggs to previous episodes. The programme is an instance of speculative fiction within science fiction: the majority of episodes are set in dystopian near-futures with novel technologies that exaggerate a trait from contemporary culture, often the internet. An example is "Crocodile", where the Recaller device used to view a person's memories is the main difference from the modern world. Many such technologies involve altering the human body or consciousness, with little in-universe concern for the morality of these actions. They provide convenience or freedom to the user, but exacerbate problematic personality traits.

Adrian Martin of Screen wrote that many episodes depict "basic human emotions and desires" that "intersect with, and get twisted by, a technological system that invariably spins out of control and into catastrophe". Retrofuturistic designs highlight the theme of each episode, often showing a lack of comfort, emotional connection or personalisation. Recurring themes throughout Black Mirror include data privacy and surveillance, virtual reality, individualism and consumerism. Many episodes have plot twists.

However, individual episodes explore varying genres. Crime fiction episodes include the police procedurals "Hated in the Nation" and "Smithereens" and the Nordic noir "Crocodile". Horror and psychological horror are features of "Black Museum" and "Playtest", respectively. The first episode, "The National Anthem", contains black comedy and political satire. Some episodes employ features of lighter-hearted genres, such as romance in "San Junipero" and "Striking Vipers", romantic comedy in "Hang the DJ", or space opera in "USS Callister". Other genres include drama ("Fifteen Million Merits"), psychological thriller (Black Mirror: Bandersnatch), post-apocalyptic fiction ("Metalhead"), and war film ("Men Against Fire").

Black Mirror can be seen to demonstrate a negative view of unending pursuit of scientific and technological advancement. Juliana Lopes of Via Panorâmica argued that the dystopian settings resemble the French Marxist Guy Debord's concept of the spectacle, wherein mass media create alienation and an unattainable utopia for individuals to pursue. For instance, in "Nosedive", the protagonist Lacie strives for a utopian life through superficiality and performativity, in a society where social media success contributes to high socioeconomic status. Academics writing in Quarterly Review of Film and Video found that Black Mirror episodes fall into a genre of "mind-game films", wherein protagonists are disoriented and narratives are non-linear or fragmented. Films in this genre include Inception (2010) and Eternal Sunshine of the Spotless Mind (2004), and these works often show the unreliability of the state, technology or family.

Some critics believed that episodes produced under Channel 4 had a more British tone or shared aesthetic qualities not found in later series. In contrast, Netflix episodes including "Nosedive", "San Junipero", "USS Callister" and "Hang the DJ" evidence pastel aesthetics, use of 1980s or 1990s nostalgia and lighter-hearted tones than Channel 4 episodes. The frequency of happy endings and positive uses of technology increase in later series. With the use of a werewolf in "Mazey Day" and a demon in "Demon 79", the sixth series introduced supernatural horror elements to Black Mirror, and reduced the role of technology.

=== Connections between episodes ===
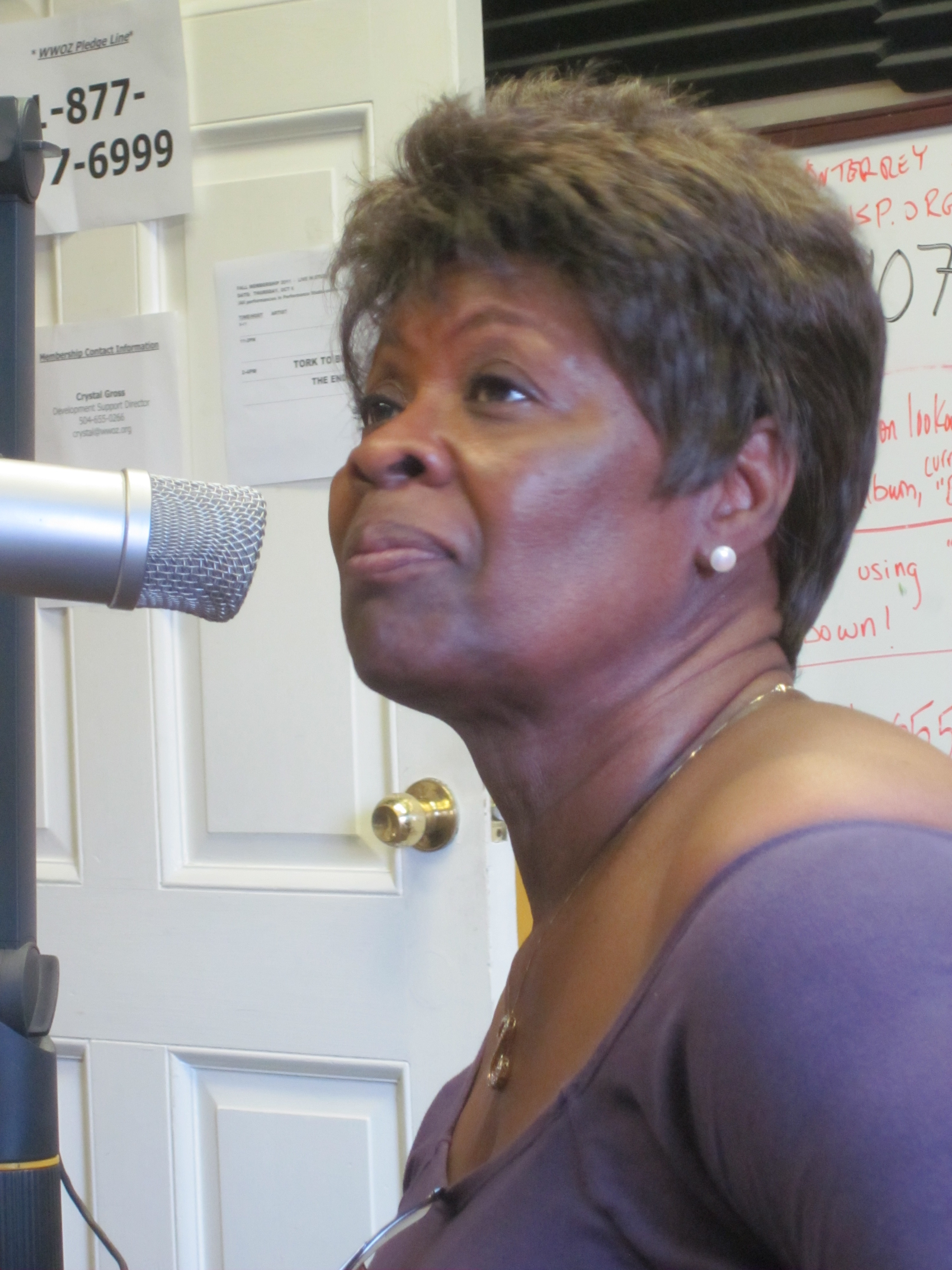
Irma Thomas, whose 1964 song "Anyone Who Knows What Love Is (Will Understand)" recurs throughout Black Mirror

Later episodes include Easter egg allusions—small references to other installments. For example, the fictional news channel UKN recurs between episodes, and the company Fence's Pizza appears in both "USS Callister" and "Crocodile". A large number of Easter eggs are found in news tickers and social media feeds shown in various episodes. The main set of the final episode of the fourth series, "Black Museum", included references to every prior episode of the series. The song "Anyone Who Knows What Love Is (Will Understand)" (1964) by Irma Thomas appears in seven episodes: "Fifteen Million Merits", "White Christmas", "Men Against Fire", "Crocodile", "Rachel, Jack and Ashley Too", "Joan Is Awful", and "Common People". A symbol designed by Brooker and first used in "White Bear" is a symbol of branching paths in Bandersnatch and marked on a talisman in "Demon 79", among other uses.

Actors rarely appear in more than one episode; those who do have unrelated roles. Aaron Paul starred in "Beyond the Sea", a space-themed episode, after agreeing to a cameo in "USS Callister" if it did not bar him from appearing in other episodes. Hannah John-Kamen played the singer Selma ("Fifteen Million Merits") and the journalist Sonja ("Playtest"); Michaela Coel was an airline check-in worker ("Nosedive") and the space crew member Shania ("USS Callister"); Monica Dolan acted as a police officer ("Smithereens") and a protagonist's mother ("Loch Henry"); Daniel Lapaine played the minor character Max ("The Entire History of You") and the doctor Daniel ("Black Museum"). Anjana Vasan and Paapa Essiedu from "Demon 79" also make cameo appearances in "USS Callister: Into Infinity".

A glyph recurring throughout the series, designed by Brooker and first used in "White Bear"

Some writers believe that Black Mirror episodes are set in a shared universe, due to the abundance of Easter eggs, or tonal and thematic connections across the programme as a whole. Fans and journalists have attempted to establish concrete chronologies between episodes. The series creator Charlie Brooker's comments on this topic changed over time. He initially described the programme's setting as an "artistic universe" or "psychologically shared universe". After the release of the third series, he said that a line in "Hated in the Nation" that references the central crime in "White Bear" established a "canonical" connection between them. Brooker said of "Black Museum" that it "does actually now seem to imply that it is all a shared universe".

However, he described the Easter eggs in 2018 as "an extra bit of texture for fans" and not a consideration that limits the design of new episodes. After the sixth series, Brooker commented that the viewer could consider each episode to be a Streamberry show—the Netflix parody featured in "Joan Is Awful" whose titles reference previous instalments.

== Episodes ==
The series was originally commissioned by Channel 4 in the United Kingdom and premiered in December 2011. A second series ran during February 2013. In September 2015, Netflix purchased the programme, commissioning a series of 12 episodes later divided into two series of six episodes. The first six episodes were released simultaneously on Netflix worldwide as the overall third series on 21 October 2016. The fourth series of six episodes was released on 29 December 2017.

A fifth series consisting of three episodes was released on 5 June 2019. The first four series, and the special "White Christmas", have been released on DVD. A sixth series was commissioned in 2022 and was released on 15 June 2023. A seventh series was announced in November 2023, and was released on 10 April 2025.

| Series | Episodes | Originally released | | |
| Series | Episodes | First released | Last released | Network |
|---|---|---|---|---|
| 1 | 3 | 4 December 2011 | 18 December 2011 | Channel 4 |
| 2 | 3 | 11 February 2013 | 25 February 2013 | Channel 4 |
| Special | | 16 December 2014 | | Channel 4 |
| 3 | 6 | 21 October 2016 | | Netflix |
| 4 | 6 | 29 December 2017 | | Netflix |
| Interactive film | | 28 December 2018 | | Netflix |
| 5 | 3 | 5 June 2019 | | Netflix |
| 6 | 5 | 15 June 2023 | | Netflix |
| 7 | 6 | 10 April 2025 | | Netflix |

=== Series 1 ===
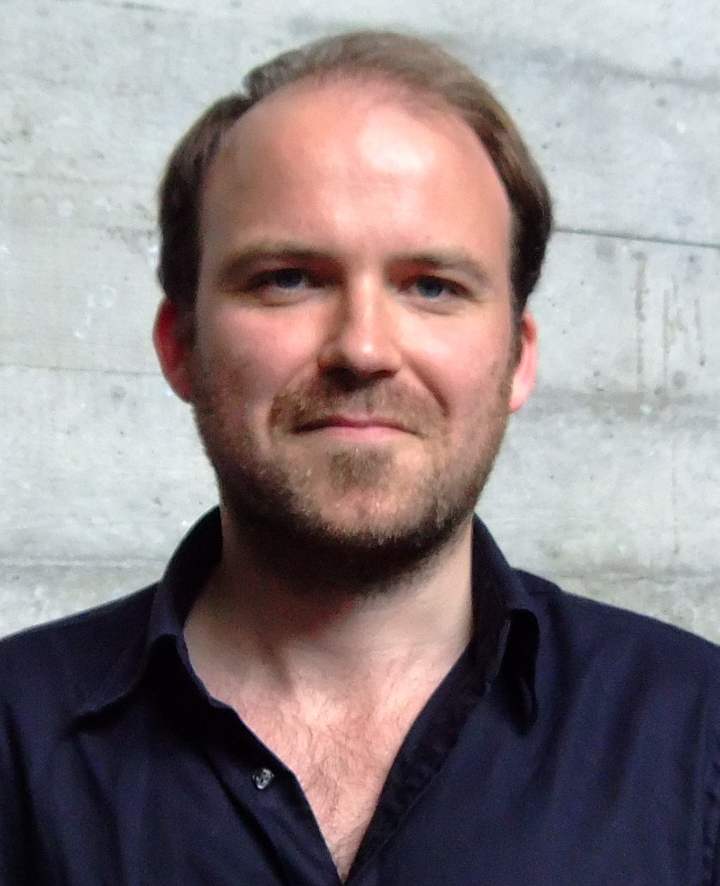
Rory Kinnear starred as Prime Minister Michael Callow in the first episode, "The National Anthem".

The series's inception was in 2010. Brooker and Jones had begun to work together on Charlie Brooker's Screenwipe, a television review programme which aired from 2006 to 2008. The first pitch for Black Mirror, to the head of comedy at Channel 4, was for eight half-hour episodes by different authors. Technology was a lesser focus, and the worlds were larger and more detailed, which Jones said was not possible to execute properly in the short runtime. The series was then commissioned for three hour-long episodes. The first script was "Fifteen Million Merits". The second was "Inbound", an episode that was never produced: it was a science fiction adaptation of what was revealed at the end to be a true story about a boy in the Iraq War. Concepts from it were later repurposed for "Men Against Fire". The following script pitched became "The National Anthem", the first episode to air. The third episode is "The Entire History of You".

The programme was produced by Brooker's production company Zeppotron, for the Dutch media company Endemol. Joel Collins served as production designer, with his company Painting Practice working on visual effects. In the early stages of Black Mirror, Jones was keen to avoid casting comedy actors, as Brooker was previously a comedy writer, and they wanted to distance the series from the genre. The production occurred concurrent to that of A Touch of Cloth, a satirical police procedural series that Brooker wrote for.

The series aired weekly beginning on 4 December 2011. "The National Anthem" features Rory Kinnear as a British prime minister who must have sex with a pig for a kidnapped princess to be released. In "Fifteen Million Merits", Daniel Kaluuya plays Bing and Jessica Brown Findlay plays Abi, two characters in a society where most people must cycle each day to earn currency. "The Entire History of You" follows the married couple Liam and Ffion, played by Toby Kebbell and Jodie Whittaker, respectively, as Liam becomes suspicious of Ffion's relationship to a friend.

=== Series 2 ===
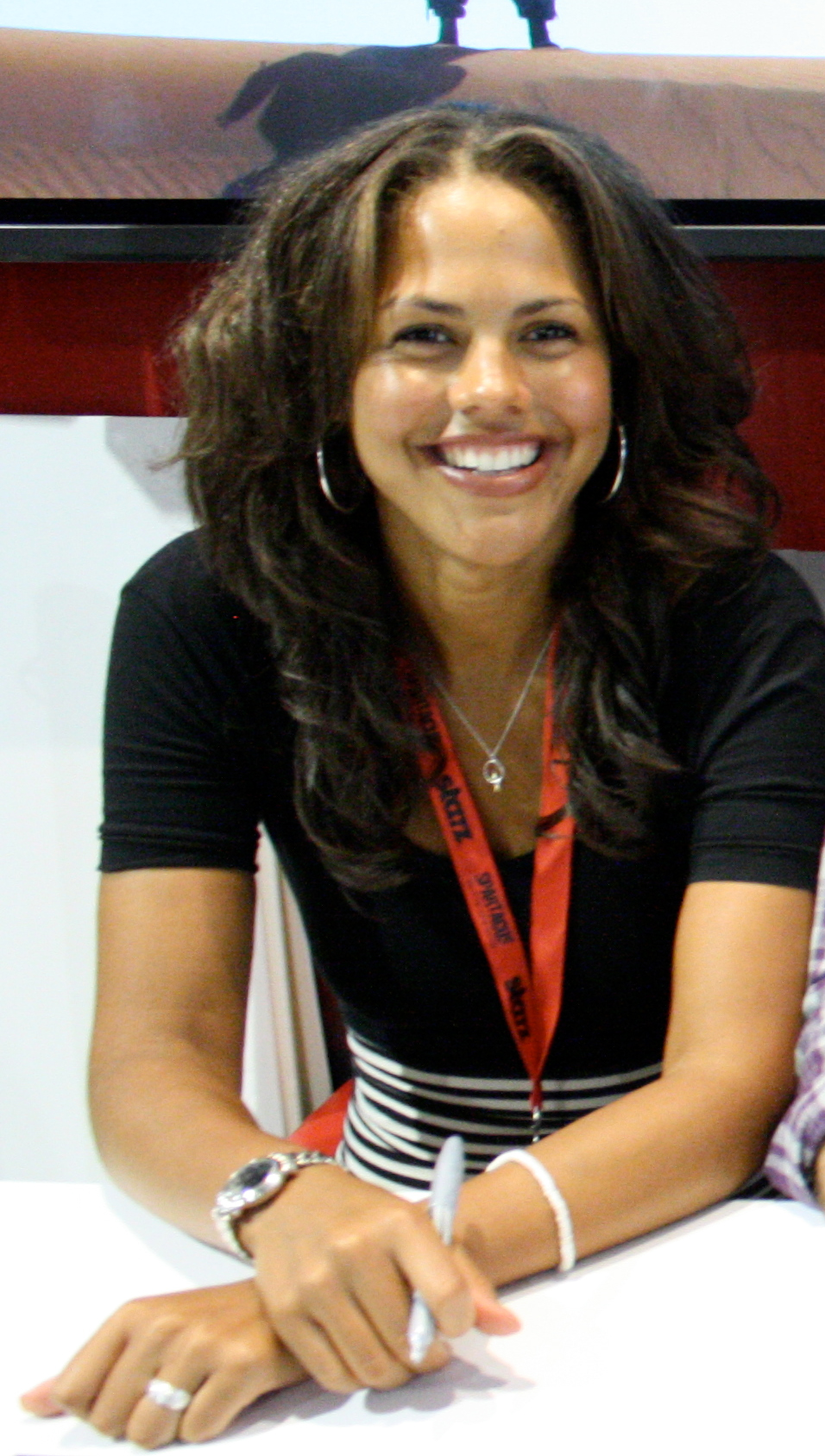
Lenora Crichlow starred as Victoria Skillane in "White Bear".

The first series was expensive for Channel 4, as the anthology format meant there were no economies of scale, but Black Mirror was commissioned for a second series of three episodes. Brooker described it as "more epic in scale, but more intimate in scope": the episodes have more understated technologies. Brooker commented that the second series mirrors the first: the former has topics of (in order) "warped political satire", "dystopian hellscape", and "relationship torn apart by technology", while the latter presents episodes of these forms in reverse. Each episode in the first series had a male protagonist, so Brooker deliberately wrote female protagonists for the first two episodes, "Be Right Back" and "White Bear".

A trailer for the second series was made by Moving Picture Company and featured a dream sequence, a factory and a large dust cloud, but no extracts of series two episodes. The series aired weekly from 11 February 2013. "Be Right Back" follows Martha (Hayley Atwell) turning to artificial intelligence for emotional support while grieving over the death of her partner Ash (Domhnall Gleeson). Lenora Crichlow stars as Victoria Skillane, a woman in a supposed apocalypse setting who has lost her memory, in "White Bear". "The Waldo Moment" is a political satire starring Daniel Rigby as Jamie Salter, a man who contests a by-election as an animated bear. Black Mirror was first made available in the US from November 2013 via DirecTV, where episodes aired on Audience and were available online.

=== "White Christmas" ===
According to Brooker, the series was still taking its budget from the comedy department of Channel 4, and there was discussion of whether it should fall under the drama department instead. Shane Allen, head of comedy for Channel 4 at the time, stated in 2018 that someone had been taken aback by the budget for Black Mirror, which was well above the standard for a comedy. The new head of comedy did not have an existing relationship with Brooker and Jones.

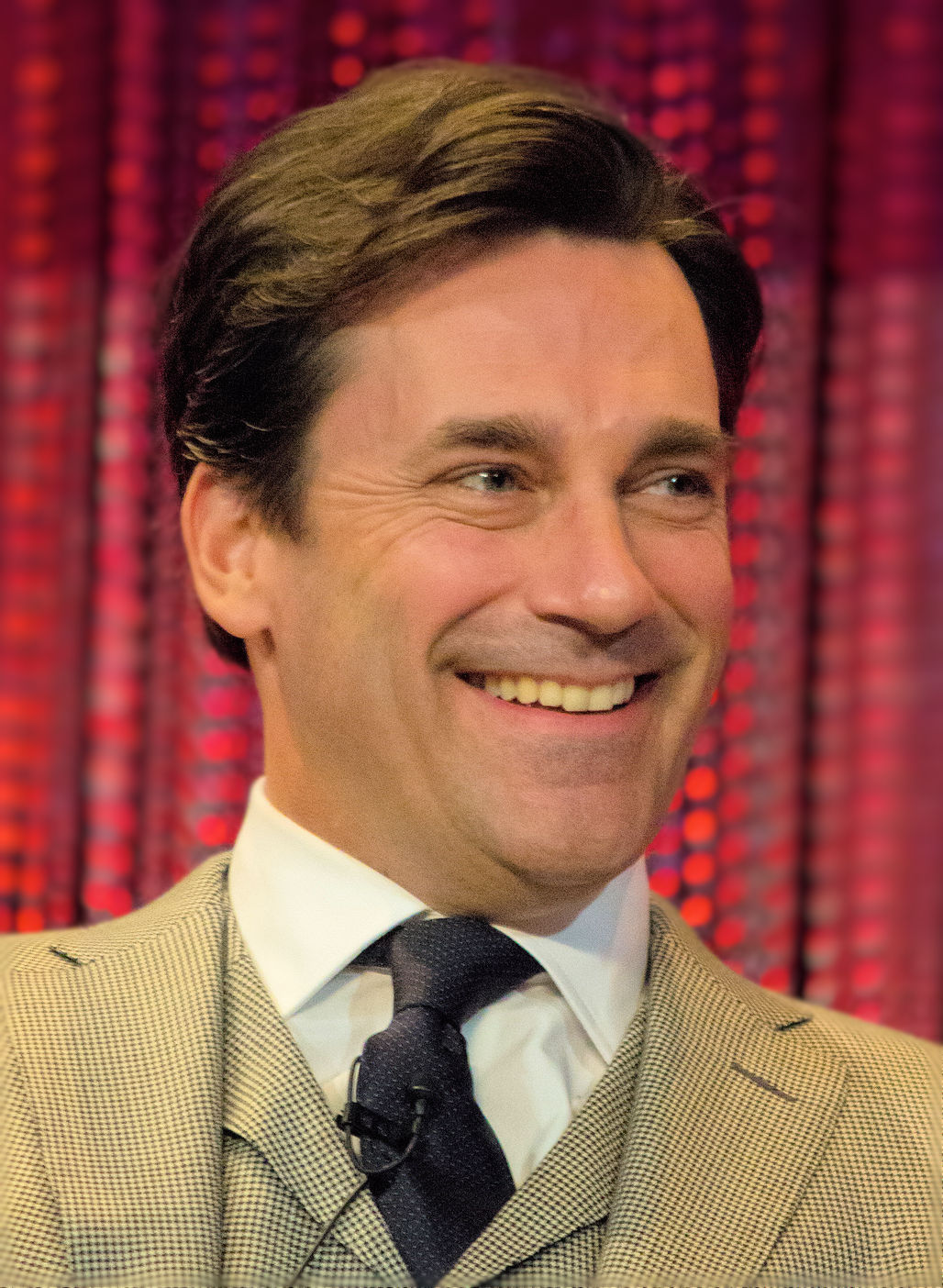
Jon Hamm, who played Matt in "White Christmas"

Brooker reported in 2018 that Channel 4 agreed on a third series of four episodes, but requested detailed synopses of the episodes in advance. Brooker came up with an episode "Angel of the Morning", which would later become a story in "White Christmas". He also conceived of an episode based on the earlier script "Inbound" which would have been similar to the later "Men Against Fire". Another episode was named "Crocodile", which overlapped in parts with the series four episode of the same name. After a lengthy wait, Brooker and Jones were told that the ideas "weren't very Black Mirror". Though Channel 4 may have suggested making a one-off special, Jones said that she felt a lack of clarity from them.

Jones and Brooker worked on other projects for the next year, such as A Touch of Cloth. They set up House of Tomorrow, a division of Endemol under which later Black Mirror content would be produced. After bumping into a Channel 4 staff member, Brooker emailed the channel to ask how to continue with Black Mirror. Channel 4 had the budget for an hour-long Christmas special, but Jones and Brooker pushed for a 90-minute episode. "White Christmas" was a portmanteau of three stories, inspired by works such as the 1983 science fiction film Twilight Zone: The Movie. It starred Jon Hamm as Matt and Rafe Spall as Joe throughout. Actors in the individual stories include: Rasmus Hardiker as Harry, Natalia Tena as Jennifer, Oona Chaplin as Greta, Janet Montgomery as Beth, and Ken Drury as Beth's father. The episode aired on 16 December 2014.

=== Series 3 ===
On the day of the press screening for "White Christmas", Brooker and Jones had a meeting with Channel 4 executives, who told them that they wanted to continue the series but due to budget constraints, it would need to be a co-production. The pair had travelled to Los Angeles a few months prior to try to secure co-production funding but were unsuccessful. The channel also suggested that Brooker could write an episode of Electric Dreams (2017–2018), an adaptation of short stories by Philip K. Dick. They also considered a five-episode series with an overarching storyline, at the suggestion of a US network, nicknaming the plan Game of Drones.

On 1 December 2014, the first two series of the programme were released on Netflix in the United States after they bought exclusive streaming rights, leading to increased audience attention for the programme. In a bidding war between channels, which included the American companies AMC, Syfy and HBO, Netflix led with a commitment of two series of ten episodes each. Brooker and Jones reported in 2018 that although they and Netflix were both keen to have Channel 4 as equal partners, Channel 4 were evasive. They eventually got a meeting without discussion of a co-production with Netflix, where the channel suggested a renewal for three episodes. The channel later offered six episodes if full treatments could be given in advance, but Brooker and Jones were concerned due to past rejection of ideas. They had a limited time to reply to US offers and chose to make a deal with Netflix.

In September 2015, Netflix commissioned 12 episodes of Black Mirror. By this point, the series was available in around 80 territories. In March 2016, it outbid Channel 4 for the rights to distributing the third series in the UK, with a bid of US$40 million. Endemol released a statement saying that Channel 4 had "had the opportunity to recommission [Black Mirror] since 2013 and passed on this and subsequent co-production offers put to them. [...] Further efforts were made to try to reach a settlement regarding a UK window for Channel 4, but these were also sadly to no avail". In a press release, Channel 4 stated that they "offered to recommission Black Mirror". This marked the first time that an online streaming service had gained the rights to a series when the original network had wished to renew it.

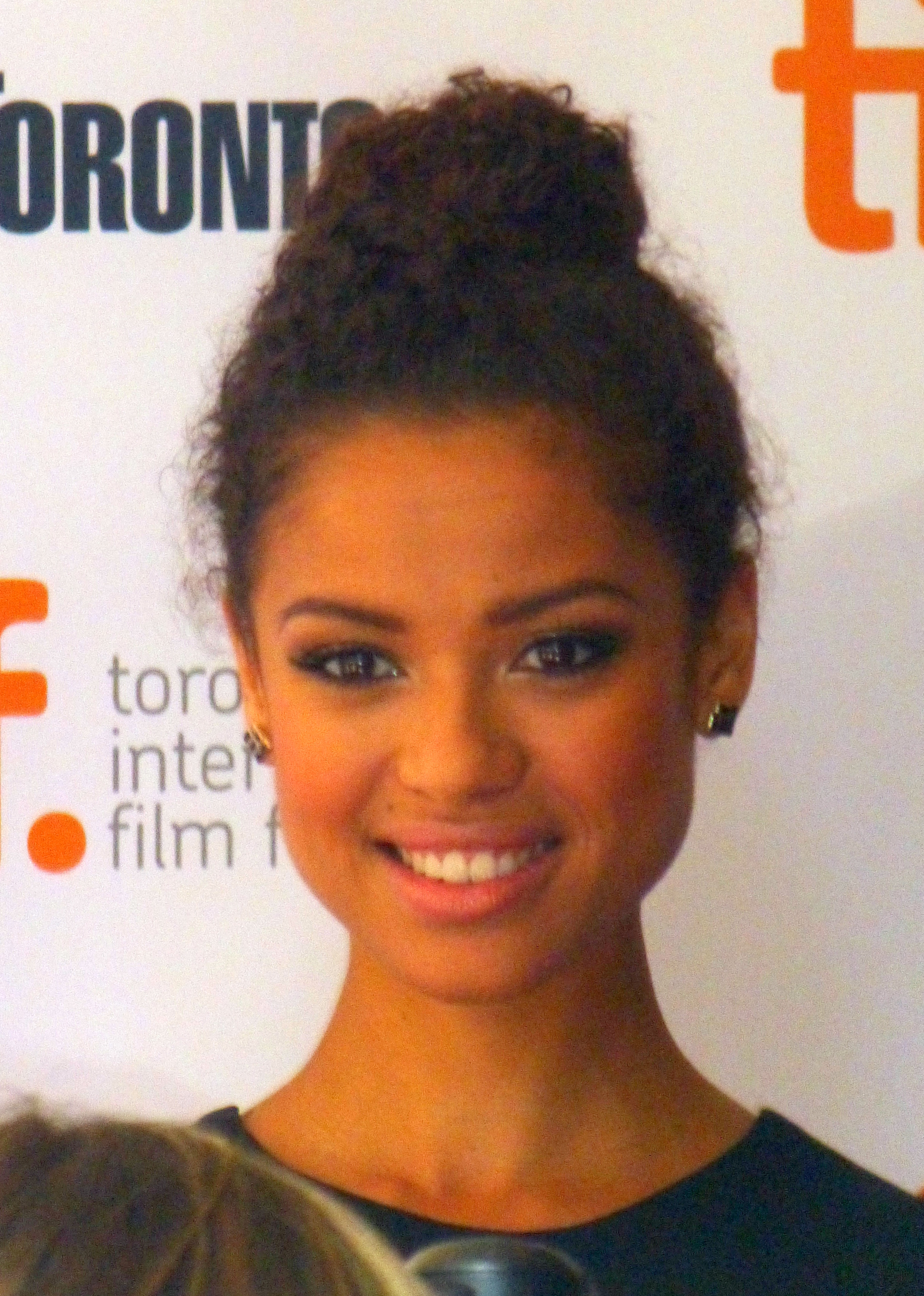
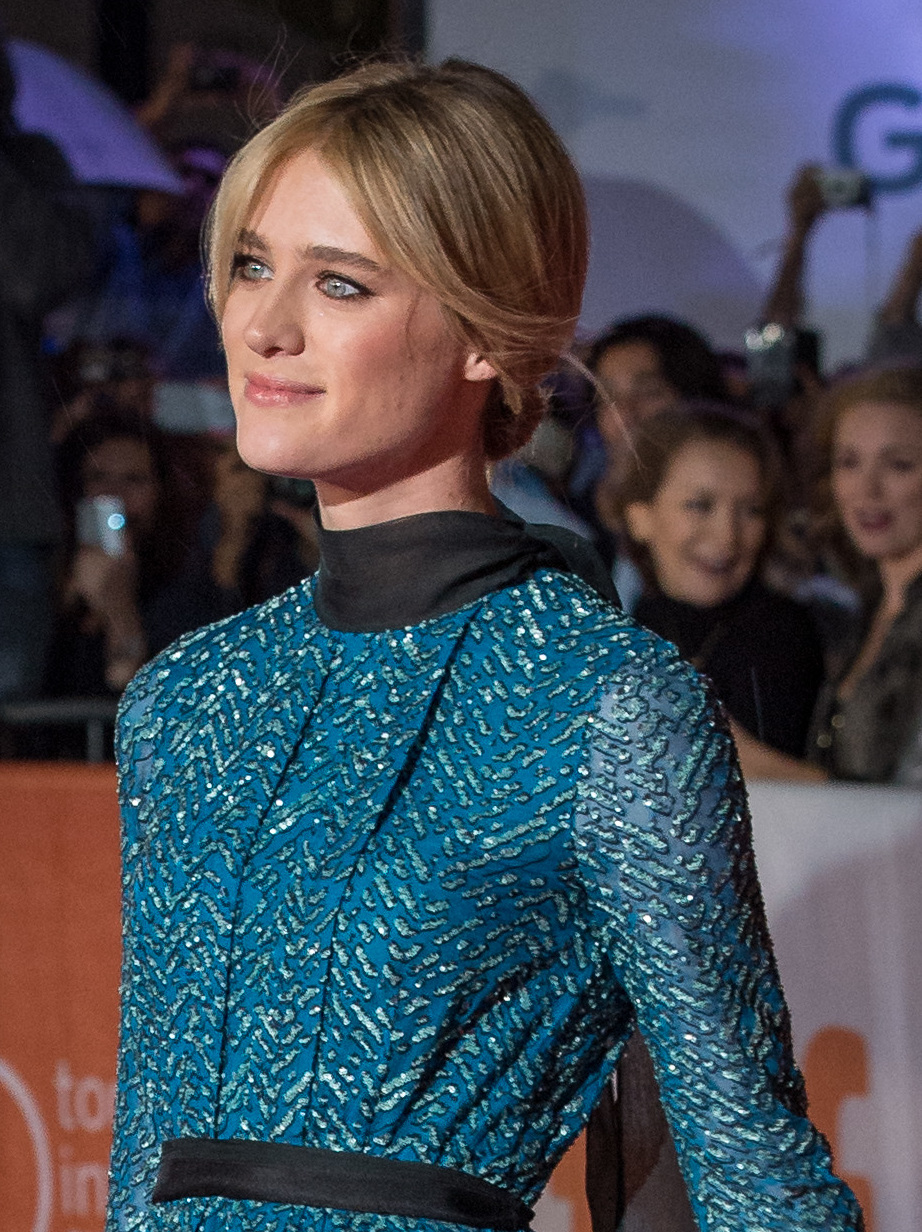
Gugu Mbatha-Raw (left) and Mackenzie Davis (right) starred in "San Junipero", the first episode written for Netflix.

In developing the third series's stories, Brooker had looked at previous episodes and recognised that all of the stories were about characters becoming trapped in a situation from which they could not escape. With the third series, Brooker wanted to explore different formats, adding more conventional stories like a romance and a police procedural. The producer Lucy Dyke commented that Netflix expected the series to become "bigger and better" and "more international", while production designer Joel Collins said that Netflix was happy to support ideas on the same scale or on a larger scale than previous episodes. The first episode that Brooker wrote for the series was "San Junipero", and it was an intentional departure from previous episodes as well as a "deliberate raspberry-blow" at fans who were concerned at the series's potential Americanisation.

The titles of the six episodes that make up series three were announced in July 2016, along with the release date. A trailer was released in October 2016. The series was released on Netflix worldwide on 21 October 2016. "Nosedive" is an episode starring Bryce Dallas Howard as Lacie, a woman pursuing social media popularity in a world where individuals assign ratings to every interaction with each other. "Playtest" is a horror story starring Wyatt Russell as Cooper, a playtester for a new virtual reality game.

"Shut Up and Dance" is about a teenager blackmailed anonymously over the internet, starring Alex Lawther as Kenny and Jerome Flynn as Hector, and written by Brooker and William Bridges. "San Junipero" is a science fiction love story starring Gugu Mbatha-Raw as Kelly and Mackenzie Davis as Yorkie. "Men Against Fire" is a war story starring Malachi Kirby as Stripe. "Hated in the Nation" is a police procedural, with Kelly Macdonald as Karin Parke and Faye Marsay as Blue Coulson exploring the role of robot bees in a series of deaths.

=== Series 4 ===
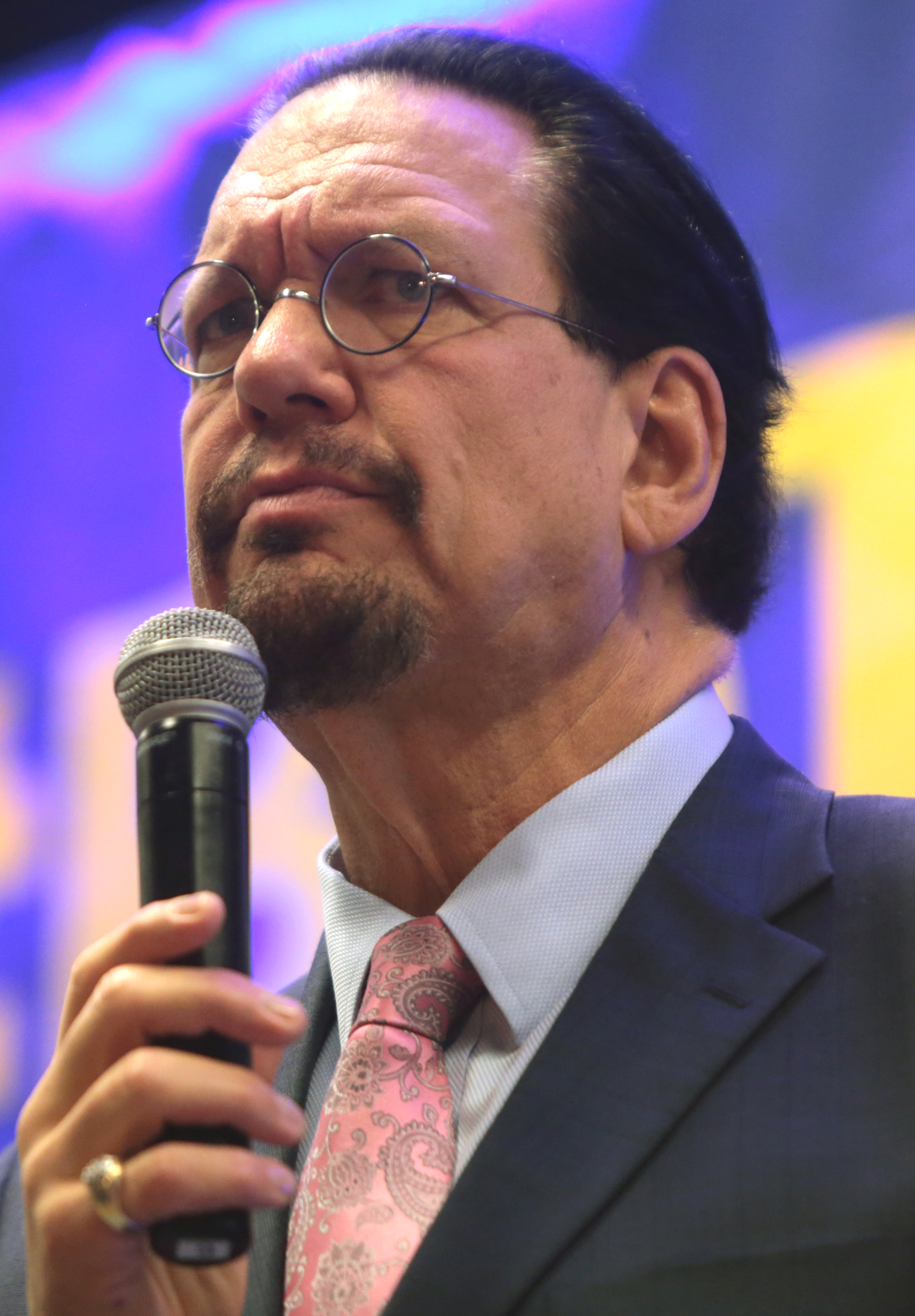
The magician Penn Jillette, who contributed to "Black Museum"

Brooker said that the fourth series of six episodes has more variety than the third. He began writing in July 2016 and continued throughout the 2016 United States presidential election; he told Digital Spy that he did not know what demand there would be for "nothing but bleak nihilism" and thus included "more hope" than in previous series. The first episode made was "Arkangel", which was filmed in Canada in November 2016. The Netflix budget allowed them to set and film "Crocodile" in Iceland and make the special effects-intensive episode "Metalhead". Filming concluded in June 2017.

In May 2017, a Reddit post unofficially announced the names and directors of the six episodes in series 4 of Black Mirror. The first trailer debuted on 25 August 2017 and two promotional photos were released in September. Beginning on 24 November, Netflix published a series of posters and trailers for each episode in the fourth series of the programme, referred to as the "13 Days of Black Mirror", concluding on 6 December with the announcement of the release date, 29 December 2017.

"USS Callister" is a space epic based around a video game company, starring Jesse Plemons as CTO Robert Daly and Cristin Milioti as the new programmer Nanette Cole. "Arkangel" is an episode about a mother implanting an invasive technology in her daughter, starring Rosemarie DeWitt as Marie and Brenna Harding as Sara, and directed by Jodie Foster. "Crocodile" is about the consequences of a hit-and-run, starring Andrea Riseborough as Mia.

"Hang the DJ" is a love story between Amy, played by Georgina Campbell, and Frank, played by Joe Cole, centred around an artificial intelligence that selects people's partners for them. "Metalhead" is a black-and-white apocalypse episode starring Maxine Peake as Bella, a woman trying to escape a robotic "dog", and directed by David Slade. "Black Museum" is an anthology of three stories, one of which was written by the magician Penn Jillette. Focused around a crime museum, the episode stars Douglas Hodge as Rolo Haynes and Letitia Wright as Nish.

According to Engadget and Gizmodo, as a means of viral marketing Netflix sent private messages to users of the Turkish website Ekşi Sözlük. The messages were sent from the account "iamwaldo" and read, "We know what you're up to. Watch and see what we will do." Although the advertising was met with positive reception from some users, others were concerned by distress that the messages may have caused.

=== Bandersnatch ===
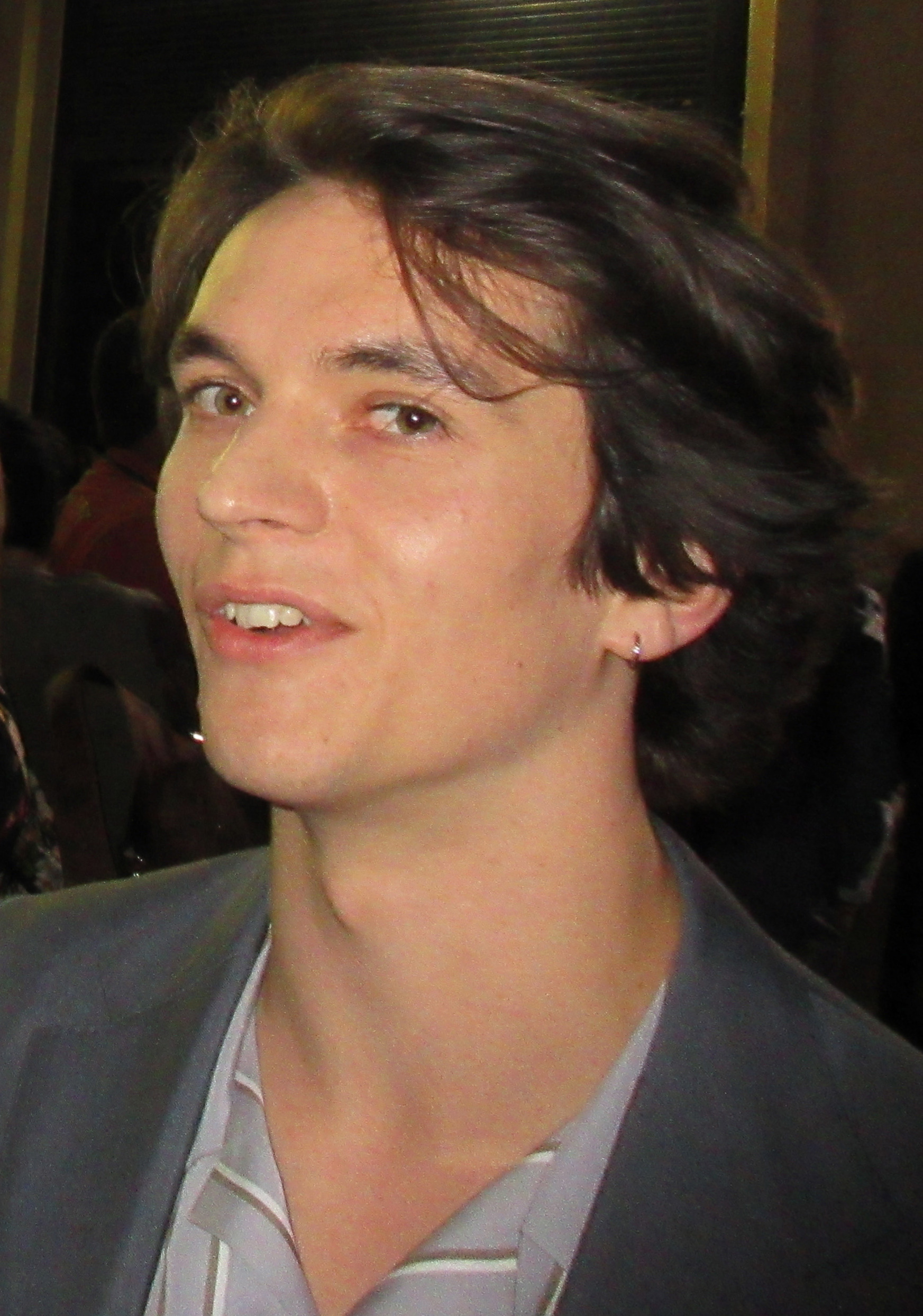
Fionn Whitehead, who starred as Stefan in Bandersnatch

After much media speculation sparked by social media reports of filming, a quickly deleted Twitter announcement by Netflix and foreign film board certifications, Netflix announced on 27 December 2018 that the film Black Mirror: Bandersnatch would be released the following day. Set in 1984, the film follows Stefan, portrayed by Fionn Whitehead, a young programmer who begins to question reality and experience deteriorating mental health as he adapts a sprawling fantasy novel into a video game. Bandersnatch is an interactive film, regularly prompting the viewer to select one of two choices on screen that affect how the storyline continues; there are over one trillion potential paths to view the work and five distinct endings. Other main cast include Will Poulter, Craig Parkinson, Alice Lowe, and Asim Chaudhry. In May 2025, Bandersnatch was removed from Netflix due to its interactive features limiting technological efforts in other areas.

=== Series 5 ===
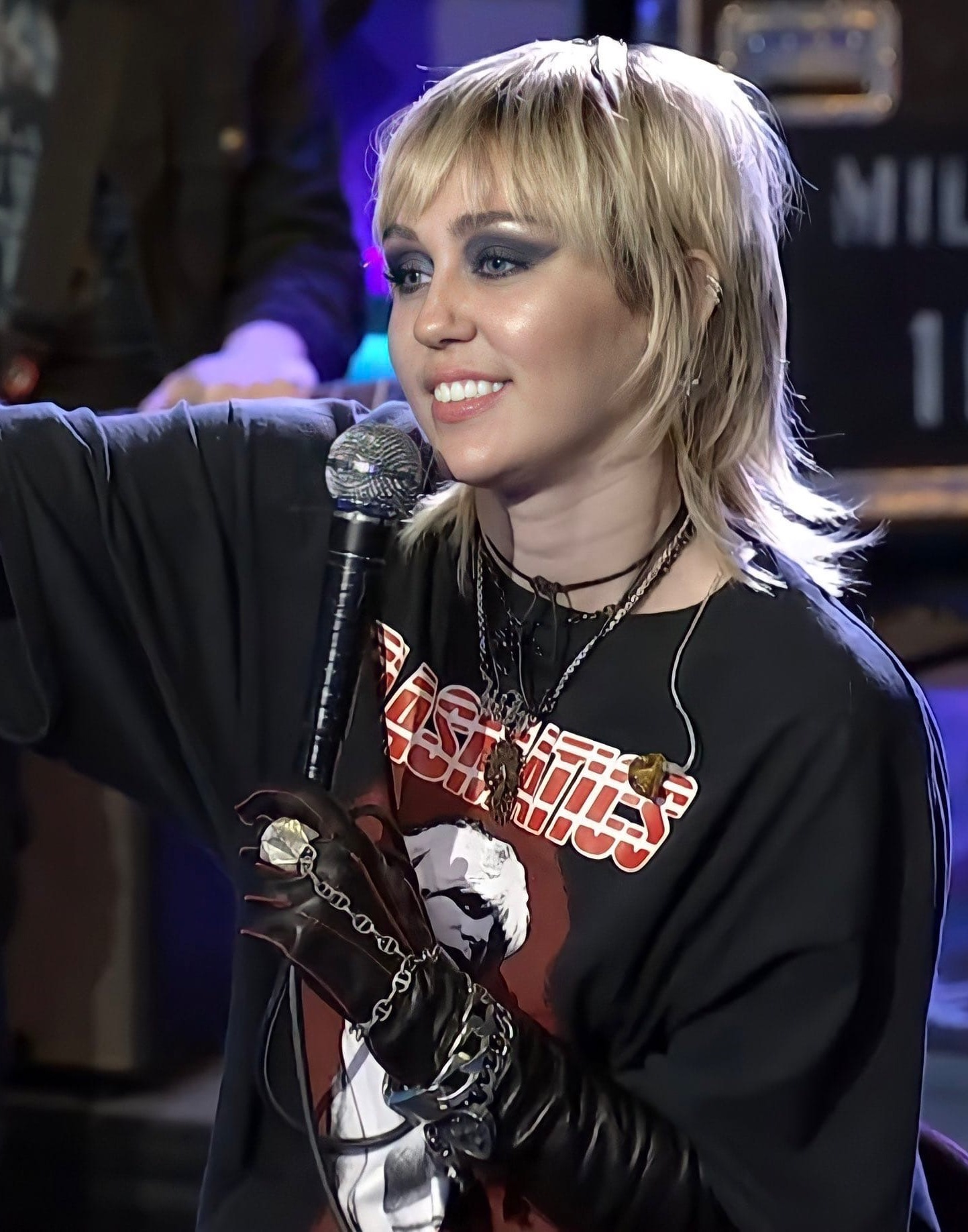
Miley Cyrus, who plays a pop star in the final episode of the fifth series, "Rachel, Jack and Ashley Too"

Netflix announced the fifth series on 5 March 2018. The complexity of Bandersnatch, which was originally part of the fifth series, delayed production, although Netflix still committed to its release in 2019. The first episode, "Striking Vipers", had been filmed prior to Bandersnatch. On 15 May 2019, a trailer for the fifth series was released, indicating it would comprise three episodes.

On 5 June 2019, the series was released. "Striking Vipers" sees Danny (Anthony Mackie) and Karl (Yahya Abdul-Mateen II) exploring a virtual relationship despite Danny's marriage to Theo (Nicole Beharie). "Smithereens" follows Andrew Scott as Chris through his kidnapping of a social media company intern. "Rachel, Jack and Ashley Too" stars the two titular sisters (Angourie Rice and Madison Davenport) co-operating with a doll cloned from the pop star Ashley O (Miley Cyrus).

=== Series 6 ===
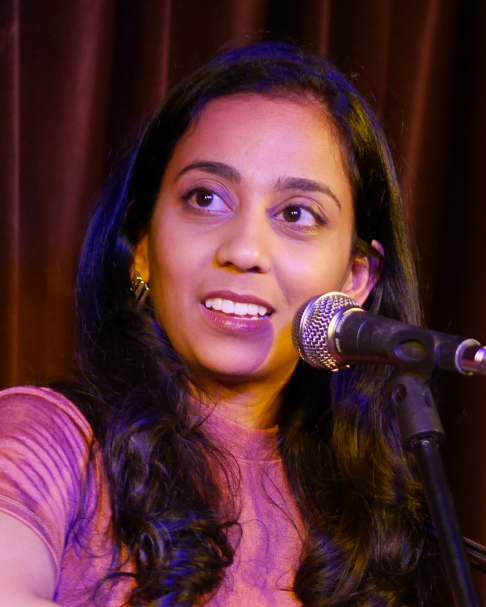
Anjana Vasan stars as Nida in "Demon 79", the first episode written for the sixth series.

Around January 2020, Brooker and Jones announced their departure from House of Tomorrow. Variety reported that intellectual property issues were at the centre of this change, with the series's rights held by Endemol. By February 2020, Brooker and Jones had established Broke and Bones, a new production company. Netflix had arranged a long-term contract for series and other production rights with the Broke and Bones company by July 2020, although rights for Black Mirror still remained with Endemol. According to Variety, this left Brooker and Jones unable to produce additional series unless new agreements were put in place.

In a May 2020 interview with Radio Times, Brooker questioned whether the public mood would suit a sixth series of Black Mirror and said that he had been working on more comedic projects. A sixth series was announced by Netflix in May 2022, to consist of more than three episodes. The series was produced by Broke and Bones, rather than House of Tomorrow. However, House of Tomorrow's new owners Banijay retained ownership of the programme.

Brooker started writing the sixth series with the idea to "refresh" or "reset" what Black Mirror was about. He stated that many new dystopian sci-fi programmes had emerged since its 2011 debut, and he now wished to focus on horror and settings in the past. He said that Black Mirror should continually reinvent itself and display standalone stories; he began the series by "deliberately upending" his "core assumptions" about the programme. Some episodes contain elements he had "previously sworn blind" he would avoid. The idea was to prevent Black Mirror being "the show about consciousness being uploaded into a little disc". He began with "Demon 79", a horror story set in the past without technology as a theme.

Filming took place in mid-2022. The first teaser trailer was released on 26 April 2023, announcing a June release date; the five episode titles followed in May. The series was released on 15 June 2023. "Joan Is Awful" follows Annie Murphy's character Joan as a Streamberry programme is made about her life using computer-generated imagery (CGI) and starring Salma Hayek as Joan; "Loch Henry" explores true crime, as Samuel Blenkin's Davis and Myha'la Herrold's Pia make a documentary about a serial killer in Scotland.

Set in 1969, "Beyond the Sea" is about the isolation of the astronauts Cliff (Aaron Paul) and David (Josh Hartnett), despite their ability to inhabit artificial replicas on Earth. "Mazey Day" follows a paparazza (Zazie Beetz) in 2006 as the title character Mazey (Clara Rugaard) transforms into a werewolf. "Demon 79" sees Nida (Anjana Vasan) unleashing a demon named Gaap (Paapa Essiedu) who encourages her to kill three humans.

=== Series 7 ===
A seventh series was announced in November 2023. In March 2024, it was announced that one of its six episodes would be a sequel to "USS Callister"—marking the first Black Mirror story to receive a continuation. Immediately following its release in 2017, the director Toby Haynes had expressed interest in a television series spin-off, and Brooker and Jones did not rule out a sequel. On 19 September 2024, Awkwafina, Issa Rae, Paul Giamatti, Billy Magnussen and Tracee Ellis Ross were announced to have joined the cast of series 7, with Magnussen reprising his role from the fourth series' "USS Callister". Additional cast include Rashida Jones, Chris O'Dowd, Siena Kelly, Rosy McEwen, Emma Corrin, Peter Capaldi, Lewis Gribben, and Patsy Ferran, as well as Poulter, Chaudhry, Milioti, Simpson, and Plemons reprising their roles from previous series. The series was released on 10 April 2025.

Following Series 7's release, both Brooker and Jones announced they were leaving Broke & Bones in July 2025, which according to Deadline Hollywood, was the conclusion of their five-year contract with Netflix in 2020, and which would give them freedom to develop series for other media outlets. The rights to Black Mirror would remain with Netflix, and Brooker said he would still like to write more episodes.

=== Series 8 ===
In January 2026, Black Mirror was renewed for an eighth series.

== Reception ==
At some periods of time, Black Mirror has been one of the most-watched programmes worldwide. According to Víctor Cerdán Martínez of Vivat Academia in 2018, Black Mirror was one of China's five most-watched Western television series. In 2023, Netflix reported that viewing of the sixth series totalled 60 million hours in the week of its release. Nielsen Media Research reported it as the most-viewed programme on streaming platforms in the United States that week.

According to U.S. streaming data from PlumResearch published by Media Play News, season six of Black Mirror generated 5.7 million unique viewers and 11.1 million hours watched on Netflix during the week of June 26 to July 2, 2023.

=== Critical response ===
Critical response of Black Mirror
| Season | Rotten Tomatoes | Metacritic |
|---|---|---|
| 1 | 98% (69 reviews) | 89 (4 reviews) |
| 2 | 87% (59 reviews) | —N/a |
| 3 | 86% (205 reviews) | 82 (23 reviews) |
| 4 | 85% (268 reviews) | 72 (27 reviews) |
| 5 | 66% (151 reviews) | 66 (13 reviews) |
| 6 | 78% (131 reviews) | 68 (25 reviews) |
| 7 | 85% (107 reviews) | 74 (11 reviews) |

Black Mirror has been met with critical acclaim. On Rotten Tomatoes, the seven series received ratings of 98%, 87%, 86%, 85%, 66%, 78%, and 89%. "White Christmas" received an 89% rating and Bandersnatch received a 73% rating. Metacritic, assigning scores from series three onwards, gave ratings of 82, 72, 66, 68 and 74. Bandersnatch holds a 61 rating on Metacritic.

Series one garnered praise. David Sims of The A.V. Club gave the first episode—"The National Anthem"—an A rating, viewing each character decision and plot revelation as natural. Jim Goodwin of Bleeding Cool complimented the acting. Also, the episode received 145 complaints to the television regulatory body Ofcom, the eighth-largest figure for the year. Reviewing "Fifteen Million Merits", Ryan Lambie of Den of Geek extolled the romance between Bing and Abi, as well as the production quality, music and acting. Sam Richards of The Telegraph rated it four stars, praising the "acerbic humour". Critical reaction to "The Entire History of You" was more mixed. Sims believed that Liam's actions escalated too quickly, but found the central premise of memory recording plausible. Richards thought that the memory technology was not necessary to the story, but James Hibberd of Entertainment Weekly said that the episode's execution was "sophisticated and flawless".

The series two opener, "Be Right Back", received critical acclaim. Morgan Jeffery of Digital Spy rated it four stars, praising the characters and emotionality, but criticising the ending. Flickering Myth's Luke Owen lauded the acting of Hayley Atwell as Martha and Domhnall Gleeson as Ash, as well as the directing. "White Bear" was well-received, with Simon Cocks of Screen Anarchy and Sims praising the plot twist and Tuppence Middleton's role as Jem. However, Lambie criticised the passiveness of the main character, Victoria. "The Waldo Moment" was considered the worst Black Mirror episode of the series by a number of reviewers, and criticised for poor writing and characterisation. "White Christmas" garnered positive reception, including praise of the acting and the connections between narrative threads by The A.V. Club's Zack Handlen and The Independent's Ellen Jones.

The third series received positive reception. Benjamin Lee of The Guardian and Emily St. James of Vox rated it four stars. Writing in Vulture, Jen Chaney analysed that it had an increased variety in setting and tone, as well as longer episodes. Chaney found that four episodes are "very good to great", while the other two are "merely decent". Lee praised "Nosedive" and "San Junipero" for their cinematography, acting, increased budget and narrative ambition. Richard Lawson of Vanity Fair reviewed the episodes as "all engrossing in their way", but thought "Men Against Fire" had the weakest premise and production quality. St. James wrote that the series was, as with previous series, equal parts "brilliant, ... pretty good, and ... kinda stupid", praising "San Junipero" but finding that other episodes should have been shorter and were "constrained" in their shared social media theme.

The production and acting in series four were praised, as were some episodes. Writing in Variety, Sonia Saraiya commented that four of the six episodes explore human consciousness inside technology. She viewed "Black Museum" as a demonstration of the series's flaws, with its artificial consciousness technologies, use of violence and storylines that require characters to "be stupid and/or evil". However, Saraiya said that the production and acting was "beautiful" and praised "USS Callister" and "Metalhead" for diverging from Black Mirror's "typical austere futurism". Sophie Gilbert of The Atlantic identified the same theme and praised "USS Callister" and "Hang the DJ", but saw the writing as the biggest weakness of the series. Similarly, The Sydney Morning Herald's Brad Newsome praised the series's casting, and highlighted "USS Callister" as well-directed and well-acted.

Reception to Bandersnatch and series five was more ambivalent. Linda Holmes of NPR praised Bandersnatch's technical design but criticised the narrative and the repetition of scenes. Holmes said that the audience are not given a reason to care about the main character, Stefan. In The Guardian, Lucy Mangan rated the fifth series four stars, finding that the episodes are disparate in content but share "a new air of calm authority" that could reflect "an increasing confidence" of the producers. Lucy Pavia of the Evening Standard said that the episodes "still pack a punch", with "Rachel, Jack and Ashley Too" as the highlight. However, Hugh Montgomery of the BBC said that the programme's "variable quality is more starkly evident than ever" with "one good episode to two middling-to-bad ones". Montgomery praised "Striking Vipers" as "among the finest and most soulful" episodes. Additionally, Vulture's Kathryn VanArendonk reviewed that though they are well-produced and well-acted, the instalments lack suitable premises.

The sixth series received mixed reactions, including for its historical settings and supernatural elements. Time's Judy Berman saw mixed success in the series's experimentation, but improvement over the fifth series. The Guardian's Stuart Heritage lauded the humour of "Joan Is Awful", the "successful experiment" of "Demon 79" and the social commentary of "Loch Henry". However, Leila Jordan of Paste criticised that it lacked "visions for the future". Vanity Fair's Richard Lawson saw it as "hurried and undercooked", repeating ideas from earlier series and lacking timely messages.

Reception for the seventh series was positive overall, with many critics deeming it as an improvement over previous series. Brian Tallerico from Roger Ebert.com described in comparison to the prior seasons as "more artistically consistent than the last couple", also writing that "it contains one of the best chapters in the show's history". Jack Seale from The Guardian gave the season four out of five stars, writing "this warmer, more convincingly human Black Mirror is easier than ever to forgive". Writing for The Wrap, Matthew Creith commented that "the result works wonders with a talented cast and storylines that continue to impress".

Criticism of Black Mirror has depicted the show as self-righteous, with obvious morals in its stories, and excessively focused on paranoia and pessimism. Norman Wilner of Now described the first three series are "rigidly formulaic" in its presentation of a worst-case scenario and a "sardonic twist", with "San Junipero" as the exception. Chris Taylor argued for Mashable that the show should be viewed more as satire than prophecy, as it employs "nightmare logic" and concepts that require suspension of disbelief.

In a satirical article for The Toast, Daniel M. Lavery used the phrase "what if phones, but too much" to describe a parody episode plot. Some reviewers found that Black Mirror decreased in quality over time. Vulture said the show has had some "fantastically great" episodes but devolved with many "terrible" ones. Rolling Stone found the series's move to Netflix brought mixed results, with lessening impact from its overuse of simulated reality and transfer of consciousness. LaToya Ferguson wrote in Paste that later series saw a "creative downfall" and increasing Americanisation, with their lengthier episodes, higher-profile actors and more "polished" style not compensating for a decline in quality.

=== Critics' rankings ===
A number of publications named Black Mirror on their lists of the best television programmes of the 2010s:

- 5th – NME
- 6th – Esquire
- 7th – The Independent
- 15th – Darren Franich of Entertainment Weekly
- 25th – Consequence of Sound
- 57th – The A.V. Club
- 80th – Paste
- Top 100 (unranked) – IGN

Den of Geek included it as one of the 13 "Best Sci-Fi, Fantasy, and Horror Shows of the 2010s" and though Vanity Fair did not include it in their top 10, it listed the episode "White Bear" as one of 15 "honourable mentions". At the end of 2019 and 2020, a number of publications also created lists of the best television shows of the 21st century to date: readers of Digital Spy voted that Black Mirror was 13th-best, The Guardian included it in 23rd place and Deadline Hollywood reported that it was one of the 21 "most influential" programmes. In December 2023, Variety ranked Black Mirror 95th in its list of the 100 greatest TV shows of all time.

=== Accolades ===
In November 2012, Black Mirror won Best TV Movie/Miniseries at the International Emmy Awards. Bryce Dallas Howard received a Screen Actors Guild Award nomination for her performance in the episode "Nosedive". At the 69th Primetime Emmy Awards, Black Mirror received three nominations with two wins, including Outstanding Television Movie for "San Junipero". "USS Callister" received three Emmy Awards, including Outstanding Television Movie, and four Emmy nominations in 2018. Bandersnatch won two Emmys in 2019, including Outstanding Television Movie, making it the third consecutive win for Black Mirror in that category.

== Cultural impact ==
=== In fiction ===
The series American Horror Story has been credited with repopularising the anthology format, along with Black Mirror.

Along with American Horror Story (2011–), Black Mirror has been credited with repopularising the anthology format, which was rarely used in the 1990s and 2000s. This success has been attributed to changing profit incentives from increased streaming television consumption. A 2019 reboot of The Twilight Zone, the primary show to inspire Black Mirror, can be seen as an example of this. It was described by the creator Jordan Peele as broader than Black Mirror in that its themes do not have to be technological, and Sophie Gilbert of The Atlantic suggested that it may have avoided darker themes or explorations into human nature to avoid overlap.

Other anthology series that were part of this phenomenon include Room 104 (2017–2020) and Solos (2021). Adam White of The Independent stated that Black Mirror and Brooker's other works spawned an era of horror and fantasy that explores modern technology. Science-fiction television that critics have compared to Black Mirror includes Humans (2015–2018) and Upload (2020–2025).

The anthology Electric Dreams (2017–2018) was widely compared to Black Mirror. Reviewers found Electric Dreams to be less violent and more understated than Black Mirror, but contain some similar plots. For instance, the episode "Real Life" is a story about virtual reality. The settings are further in the future and more allegorical. Another example is Inside No. 9 (2014–2024), a British anthology series that critics saw as more comedic than Black Mirror, and known for intricate plot twists. The creators Reece Shearsmith and Steve Pemberton have a larger role in the show than Brooker does in Black Mirror, as they star in most episodes and direct some in addition to writing them.

The serialised British dystopia Years and Years (2019) follows a family from 2019 to 2034, and drew many comparisons to Black Mirror in themes and its near-future technology. The Verge's Liz Shannon Miller called it "Black Mirror, but with a full and beating heart". Simon Cellan Jones, who directed the first four of six episodes, saw it as less dystopian than Black Mirror, and with less emphasis on technology. The science fiction film Friend of the World (2020) was arranged like a Black Mirror episode. The creator Brian Patrick Butler said he wanted a sequence of stories with escalating tension, to create a "creepy and thought-provoking experience".

There was critical consensus that the anthology series Soulmates (2020) is inferior to Black Mirror due to its overly ambitious nature and repetitiveness. Its central conceit—that a company can determine its customers' perfect partner—is similar to the series four episode "Hang the DJ". Soulmates was created by William Bridges, a writer for two Black Mirror episodes, and Georgina Campbell—who has a starring role in "Hang the DJ"—is a main character in one episode. The One, a science-fiction programme with the same premise, was also seen as lesser than Black Mirror by critics, who cited its poor dialogue, storylines and pacing. The romantic comedy Made for Love (2021) stars Cristin Milioti and Billy Magnussen of series four episode "USS Callister" and its technological premise of a woman whose ex-husband implanted a monitoring device in her body was compared to Black Mirror. Milioti saw both stories as about "a woman trying to find herself".

The series has also been positioned as the paradigmatic forerunner of a new sub-genre of dystopian fiction, emerged during the 2010s, that has been theorised as "new media dystopia," which includes other series such as Sam Esmail's Mr Robot (2015–19), Jonathan Nolan and Lisa Joy's Westworld (2016–2022), Alex Garland's Devs (2020). The "new media dystopia" pioneered by Black Mirror is specifically defined as a mode of science fiction that, "more than speculating with future scenarios or building alternative realities, seem to be primarily concerned with reflexively examining their own medium of consumption and distribution and, therefore, in so doing, also reflecting upon their media-dominated moment" (Sebastián-Martín 120). Black Mirror, in this sense, represents a sub-genre that continues the legacy of cyberpunk but, "[a]s opposed to cyberpunk, [...] [is] much more directly and overtly about the present epoch, especially insofar as cyberpunk imaginaries have been re- appropriated— and some of its nova, materialized— with the advent of digital capitalism" (Sebastián-Martín 20).

One of three special The Simpsons episodes exclusive to Disney+ was "Yellow Mirror", released on August 2026, which parodied multiple Black Mirror episodes.

=== Comparisons to reality ===
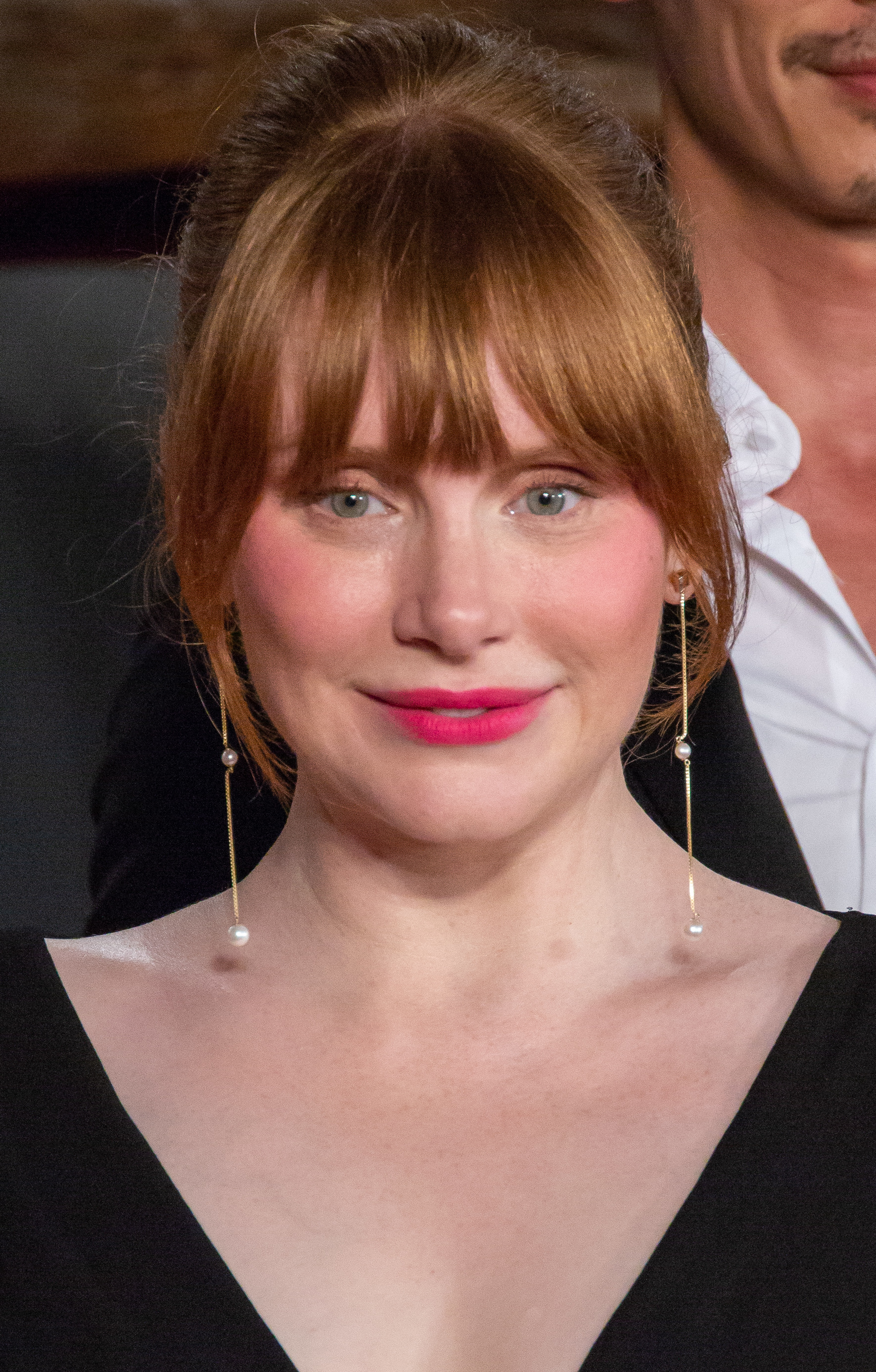
Bryce Dallas Howard starred in "Nosedive", an episode whose social media ratings-obsessed world has been compared to China's Social Credit System.

Brooker has often been described by commentators as prescient in his scripts for Black Mirror. In 2015, G. Clay Whitaker of The Daily Beast called the show a Magic 8 Ball. The first episode, "The National Anthem", features the UK prime minister blackmailed into having sexual intercourse with a pig. Four years later, the Daily Mail published allegations that the then-prime minister David Cameron had placed a "private part of his anatomy" into the mouth of a dead pig as an initiation rite at university. Brooker later said that after hearing the news, he "did genuinely for a moment wonder if reality was a simulation, whether it exists only to trick me".

In a 2013 episode called "The Waldo Moment", the animated cartoon Waldo places second in a UK by-election. The 2017–2021 US presidency of the media personality Donald Trump and the Ukrainian presidency of the comedian Volodymyr Zelenskyy from 2019 onwards were compared by journalists to the political platform of Waldo. Brooker described Trump as "an anti-politics candidate who's raucous and defensive" and "offers nothing", like Waldo. Adrian Karatnycky of Politico stated that as with Waldo, Zelenskyy had few clear policy positions prior to his election.

The 2016 episode "Nosedive" presents a society in which citizens rate interactions with each other from one to five stars and receive an overall rating that largely determines their socioeconomic status. This has been compared to China's Social Credit System, where local governments collect data on citizens to assign them an overall score. Example data points include publicly criticising the government, defaulting on a loan or having high-rated friends. Like the system in "Nosedive", a low score can limit a person's access to transport.

"Be Right Back" shows an artificial intelligence technology designed to mimic a deceased loved one. Chatbots with similar functionality and personalisation have been compared to this premise, as has a 2022 announcement that a future Amazon Alexa feature will imitate voices of dead loved ones. "Shut Up and Dance" is about a man who is blackmailed after footage of him masturbating is recorded through his webcam. Computer viruses can allow for covert recording through an unsuspecting person's webcam, and similar real-life blackmail has been reported.

More minor facets of episodes have also been seen as prescient. Ten days after "Crocodile" depicted a self-driving pizza delivery van, Toyota and Pizza Hut presented plans for a driverless pizza delivery vehicle at the 2018 Consumer Electronics Show. "Fifteen Million Merits" features a talent show with a virtual animated audience based on Britain's Got Talent. In 2020, due to the COVID-19 pandemic, Britain's Got Talent had a virtual audience, which had an aesthetic resembling that of "Fifteen Million Merits". Other real-life technologies have been described as progress towards those seen in Black Mirror, such as the motion capture animation of Waldo in "The Waldo Moment", the augmented reality military system from "Men Against Fire" and the artificial bees in "Hated in the Nation".

== Spin-off media ==
A number of Black Mirror tie-in products have been released.

=== Suggested spin-offs ===
Several sequel episodes or spin-offs have been suggested. In 2013, Robert Downey Jr. optioned the episode "The Entire History of You" to potentially be made into a film by Warner Bros. and his production company Team Downey; in 2018, the episode's writer Jesse Armstrong said that the project was in "development hell". In 2016, Brooker said that he had ideas for sequels to both "White Bear" and "Be Right Back" that were unlikely to be made. He said in 2017 that there were no plans for a sequel episode to "San Junipero". Brooker has suggested that some characters in "Hated in the Nation" could potentially recur, as could Colin Ritman (Will Poulter), a Bandersnatch character with awareness of alternate timelines and realities. Poulter did return in series 7 episode "Plaything." Additionally, the sixth-series episode "Demon 79" is introduced as a Red Mirror film; Brooker said that, if successful, there could be further episodes under this label.

=== Games ===
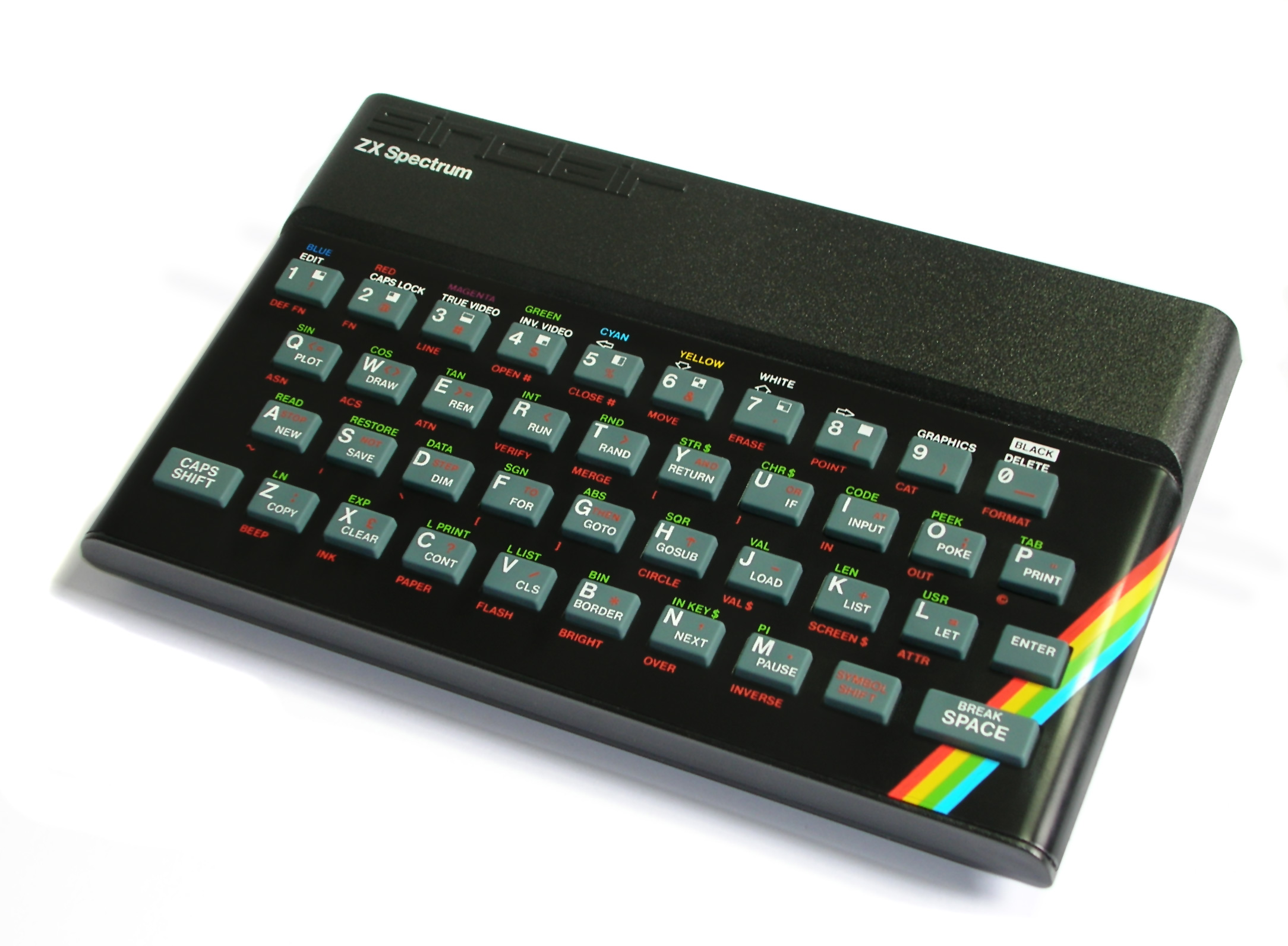
A ZX Spectrum emulator game, Nohzdyve, was created as a tie-in to Bandersnatch.

A Nosedive board game based on the episode of the same name was produced by Asmodee. Released on 25 November 2018, the game requires between three and six players and is designed to last for roughly 45 minutes. The fictional game Nohzdyve, which is featured in Bandersnatch and named after the episode "Nosedive", was created by Netflix for a ZX Spectrum emulator and released on a Bandersnatch tie-in website.

Thronglets, the in-world video game from the series 7 episode "Plaything" was made into a real world mobile game by Night School Studio, a studio within Netflix Games. Sean Krankel, head of Night School, said that they wanted to do a project with Black Mirror, creating a game beyond the bounds of what would be shown in a typical episode. Development of the game started around the time that "Plaything" was still in pre-production, allowing the design of the game to influence some of the direction and art design of the episode itself. Conversely, Night School made sure to include elements in the game reflecting the final script, such that players would feel that their game "literally got lifted out of the episode". The real-world Thronglets was released simultaneously with the release of the series 7 episodes on 10 April 2025.

=== Soundtracks ===
Soundtracks to 12 of the 23 instalments have been released on online streaming services: "Be Right Back", "White Bear", "White Christmas", "Nosedive", "San Junipero", "Men Against Fire", "Hated in the Nation", "USS Callister", "Arkangel", "Hang the DJ", "Black Museum" and "Smithereens". Brooker also released a 42-track Spotify playlist of songs that were either featured in "San Junipero" or planned for inclusion at some stage. The "Hang the DJ" soundtrack, credited to Alex Somers and featuring Sigur Rós, was additionally released on vinyl. The song "On a Roll" from "Rachel, Jack and Ashley Too" is based on the Nine Inch Nails song "Head Like a Hole". It was released by the performer, Miley Cyrus, under her character's name Ashley O and went on to chart in multiple countries. The B-side "Right Where I Belong" was another Nine Inch Nails adaptation featured in the episode.

=== Webisodes ===
External videos
- Czarne Lusterko
- 1%
- 69.90
- The Breakup
- The Sum of Happiness

A series of webisodes, titled Little Black Mirror (Polish: Czarne Lusterko), was produced for Netflix Polska by Jacek Ambrosiewicz, in collaboration with Polish YouTubers. Released on 19 January 2018, the four shorts vary between eight and twenty-one minutes in length. 69.90 explores "loneliness and gaming", according to the creators Huyen Pham and Marcin Nguyen; they discussed 20 different ideas before deciding on a computer simulation which is indistinguishable from real life. The Breakup features Krzysztof Gonciarz and Kasia Mecinski: it used realism and ordinary technology, such as a Panasonic Lumix DC-GH5 that emulates vlog aesthetics. The Sum of Happiness was posted on Martin Stankiewicz's YouTube channel and focuses on a neurological implant and a relationship app, previously explored Black Mirror topics. 1%, filmed by Groupa Filmowa Darwin, and is about a violent piece of obstetrics technology.

External videos
- Stories From Our Future
- Cure for Loneliness
- Getting to Know You
- The Healthy Alternative

A second series of webisodes, initially announced as Little Black Mirror but eventually renamed Stories From Our Future, was directed for Netflix América Latina by American YouTuber Rudy Mancuso. Initially planned for release on Netflix América Latina's YouTube channel, as part of promotion for the programme's fifth series, the original trailer for the project was removed by Netflix. The shorts were released on 10 June 2019 on YouTube channels of those involved. Cure for Loneliness was released on Mancuso's channel; Getting to Know You was released on Lele Pons' channel; The Healthy Alternative was released on Juanpa Zurita's channel. Also featured in the series is Australian actor Maia Mitchell.

=== Literature ===
In June 2018, the oral history companion book Inside Black Mirror was announced. Brooker, Jones and Jason Arnopp are the credited writers. The book features sections on the 19 episodes in the first four series, each consisting of conversational interviews from cast and crew along with stills and behind-the-scenes images. The book was released in the UK on 1 November 2018 and in the US on 20 November 2018 from Penguin Random House. Starburst rated the book ten out of ten stars, praising its "wonderfully-comprehensive format" and summarising it as "blunt, brittle, often killingly funny and lavishly-illustrated".

In June 2017, Brooker announced a series of prose stories based on Black Mirror. The first volume was to be published on 20 February 2018 and scheduled to be edited by Brooker; two further volumes were planned for later in 2018 and in 2019. Planned writers included the science fiction authors Cory Doctorow, Sylvain Neuvel and Catherine Webb, under the pseudonym Claire North. The project was postponed indefinitely in 2018 as Brooker and Jones could not dedicate enough time to it, with Brooker saying "I'm not sure when or if [the series] will appear. Probably not".

=== Black Mirror Labyrinth ===
In mid-2019, Thorpe Park Resort in Chertsey, United Kingdom, announced that it was to open a walkthrough maze, the "Black Mirror Labyrinth". The maze was scheduled to open in March 2020, but this was delayed because of the COVID-19 pandemic. It opened on 21 May 2021 and is themed around artificial intelligence. The subject's name and a photo taken of them are used to personalise the maze. It closed at the end of 2023.

=== Other ===
A 2017 museum exhibit at the Barbican Centre, entitled Into the Unknown: A Journey Through Science Fiction, included an installation based on "Fifteen Million Merits". A number of mock "Tucker's Newsagent and Games" storefronts, designed after the fictional Bandersnatch shop of the same name, were erected in Birmingham and London shortly after the film's release in 2018.

== See also ==
- Technological singularity
