= White Bear (Black Mirror) =

- Black Mirror episode
- Victoria (Lenora Crichlow) is exposed to the angry crowd. This scene exemplifies an eagerness for "an eye for an eye" punishment existing in society. One reviewer said it "attacks our current culture" trend of "dressing up the humiliation of others in the name of entertainment".
- Episode no.: Series 2 Episode 2
- Directed by: Carl Tibbetts
- Written by: Charlie Brooker
- Cinematography by: Zac Nicholson
- Editing by: Hazel Baillie
- Original air date: 18 February 2013
- Running time: 42 minutes

Guest appearances
- Lenora Crichlow as Victoria Skillane; Michael Smiley as Baxter; Tuppence Middleton as Jem; Ian Bonar as Damien; Nick Ofield as Iain Rannoch; Russell Barnett as Reporter; Imani Jackman as Jemima Sykes

Episode chronology
← Previous "Be Right Back"	Next → "The Waldo Moment"

"White Bear" is the second episode of the second series of the British science fiction anthology series Black Mirror. It was written by the series creator and showrunner Charlie Brooker and directed by Carl Tibbetts. The episode follows Victoria (Lenora Crichlow), a woman who does not remember who she is, and wakes up in a place where almost everybody is controlled by a television signal. Along with some of the few other unaffected people (Michael Smiley and Tuppence Middleton), she must stop the "White Bear" transmitter while surviving merciless pursuers.

Brooker originally wrote the episode in an apocalyptic setting, but when the script was about to be filmed at a former Royal Air Force base, he changed it because of a fence he saw there. He rewrote the story in two days, removing some details he considered useful for a sequel story. The main change was the addition of a plot twist at the end of the script, which was noted as the most impressive aspect of the episode by several reviewers.

The episode, first aired on Channel 4 on 18 February 2013, was watched by 1.2 million viewers and was very well received by critics, particularly for its writing and Crichlow's performance. The story draws parallels with real murder cases, primarily the 1960s Moors murders, in which five children were killed. Its horror aspects have been said to be reminiscent of the 1970s film The Wicker Man and the video game Manhunt, while some similarities with The Twilight Zone have also been noted. This dystopian episode reflects upon several aspects of contemporary society, such as media coverage of murders, technology's effects on people's empathy, desensitisation, violence as entertainment, vigilantism, the concept of justice and punishment, and the nature of reality.

== Plot ==
A woman (Lenora Crichlow) wakes up with amnesia, in a house where television screens are showing an unknown symbol. Turning the screens off, she finds photos of herself and a man (Nick Ofield), along with one of a small girl (Imani Jackman) which she takes with her. She leaves the house and pleads for help, but people ignore her while recording her on their phones. When a masked man opens fire at her with a shotgun, she flees and meets Jem (Tuppence Middleton). Jem explains that the symbol began appearing on television and mobile phone screens, turning most people into passive voyeurs, called "onlookers". The woman and Jem are unaffected, but they are also a target for the "hunters"- unaffected humans who use the fall of society to act sadistically. Jem plans to reach a transmitter at "White Bear" to destroy it.

As they travel, Baxter (Michael Smiley), a man who also seems unaffected, picks them up. He turns out to be another hunter, and holds them at gunpoint in a forest, where he tries to torture the women with a drilling machine, but Jem kills Baxter. They continue travelling to the transmitter; when they reach it, two hunters attack them. The woman wrestles a shotgun away from a hunter and fires at her attacker, but the gun only sprays confetti. Walls open to reveal a seated audience, and that everything was staged. Jem is an actress, and Baxter is not only alive, but also the event's master of ceremonies.

The woman is strapped to a chair and informed that her name is Victoria Skillane, and that the girl in the photograph is Jemima Sykes, whom Victoria and her fiancé, Iain Rannoch, had abducted and murdered, filming the crime. After the pair were arrested, Iain died by suicide in his cell, while Victoria was sentenced to undergo daily psychological punishment at the present facility, which is called White Bear Justice Park after a white teddy bear that Jemima owned.

Victoria is driven back to the compound past an outraged crowd and returned to where she awoke. As she is shown her own videotaped footage of Jemima prior to her murder, Baxter places electrodes on her head, simultaneously torturing her and wiping her memory of the day's events so that she will live the same day repeatedly as part of her punishment. Interspersed between the end credits, the next day's events are seen from the point of view of the park's staff, and its visitors who play the voyeurs.

== Production ==
Series creator Charlie Brooker came up with the idea while working on the 2008 zombie horror serial Dead Set. During filming, Riz Ahmed's character was being chased by zombies; some schoolchildren noticed the production and began watching, taking pictures on their phones. Brooker considered it to be "an interesting and frightening image, because they're standing there, not intervening". Brooker converted it to a script for Dead Set, in which a photograph goes viral on social media and "unlock[s] this primal urge for people to be voyeurs of agony". Although the idea was given the green light, they did not have the budget to do it.

The first conception of the episode was as "a straightforward apocalypse story", featuring a female journalist and taking inspiration from the 1967 science fiction horror film Quatermass and the Pit. The signal would have affected people all over the world, turning 90% of them into voyeurs and the rest into mad people who attacked each other; its source was never explained. It was to end with a public crucifixion.

The glyph that appears on Baxter's balaclava, and elsewhere in the episode, was made by Brooker.

The second version opened with a patient speaking to their psychiatrist about their nightmares and a recent urge to commit violence. The patient draws a glyph from their dreams, and the psychiatrist files it along with identical symbols drawn by her other patients. This glyph resembles an upside-down "Y" and was created by Brooker after much experimentation; it is the one used in the final episode. This draft had the character Baxter in it and resembled the 1973 horror film The Wicker Man. Executive producer Annabel Jones noted that the theme had shifted more towards voyeurism. By this point, director Carl Tibbetts was involved with the project.

After working on the other series two episodes "Be Right Back" and "The Waldo Moment", the latter of which was in production, there was little of the budget remaining for "White Bear". Filming was limited to a military base at RAF Daws Hill in southeast England, which was formerly a United States Air Force base. The base contained an abandoned housing estate and buildings that could be repurposed to look like shops and garages. The base was surrounded by chicken wire and Brooker considered that the fence could be there because the events of the episode were not real. Brooker believed that the public would watch certain people be tortured for entertainment — such as Jimmy Savile, against whom hundreds of sexual abuse allegations have been made, or Myra Hindley, a serial killer who committed the Moors murders with her boyfriend, Ian Brady.

Brooker then rewrote the script in two days "in a bit of a fever dream". He noted that he had never changed a script so dramatically so late in the production process, and that this is the first major plot twist in a Black Mirror episode. Brooker considered making Victoria innocent, but settled on making her unknowingly guilty. Lenora Crichlow had already been cast as Victoria prior to the rewrite.

Prior to the twist, the episode is shown from Victoria's perspective. According to Tibbetts, handheld cameras were used to make the episode "very intense and personal" and to make the viewer identify with Victoria. Contrastingly, in the end credits scenes filming is "still and static" to resemble an observer's perspective. Flashback scenes were balanced to avoid giving away too much information before the twist. The scene in which Victoria is driven through the crowd was cut shorter in the final edit and many of the crowd members were added digitally. Brooker had the idea during editing of displaying Victoria's next day at the park during the credits. The episode is 42 minutes long, slightly shorter than Channel 4's standard of 45–48 minutes for an hour-long episode.

The episode's soundtrack was composed by Jon Opstad. The score is mostly electronic. To give a different character to the music played as Victoria lives her next day in the theme park, Opstad added acoustic elements, but feeling that this did not fit with the universe he used pizzicato cello music and overlaid "spidery" atonal lines.

Brooker had other ideas that were removed from the original script because they would be complicated to do. He said he could use these ideas in a sequel story which would involve the main character finding messages that she had left for herself on previous days as the process of erasing her mind starts not to function. However, as the location for the episode no longer exists, he felt it would be more practical to create a graphic novel instead of recreating the scenario.

== Cultural references ==
Many reviewers identified an allusion to the Moors murders, committed by Ian Brady and Myra Hindley, a British couple who killed children in the 1960s. The A.V. Club's David Sims emphasised the similarities between Victoria's video recording and the fact that Hindley audio-taped the torture of one of her and Brady's victims.

It delivers one level of horror, and then the trapdoor opens and there are several additional levels of horror. In some way that must confirm to you that the world is a horrible place because it presents a society in which the world is a horrible place. If you're neurotic and fearful, then maybe "White Bear" tickles that synapse. But it's reassuring, in some way, to watch films that reveal society to be insane and heartless. It's like the filmmakers are saying, "We're not saying that this is a realistic portrayal. It's a chilling nightmare".

— Charlie Brooker, series creator

The influence of horror works was highlighted by critics and Brooker himself. Lambie found aspects of the forest scene reminiscent of 1970s exploitation films. He also felt there are several visual and thematic parallels to The Wicker Man and Kill List. Morgan Jeffery of Digital Spy agreed it is reminiscent of zombies and slasher films "and even has that unsettling Wicker Man feel with its notion of 'society gone wrong'." Brooker commented it is indeed "a Wicker Man–style horror", and Tibbetts commented that the film was "a big touchstone" for him. Because they have similar concepts, 28 Days Later and The Texas Chain Saw Massacre were also mentioned by reviewers as possible influences. Paul Brian McCoy of Comics Bulletin stated it "recalls any number of zombie apocalypse dramas, including Brooker's own Dead Set at times" and The Signal. While Brooker said the hunters' design was inspired by the horror video game Manhunt, McCoy felt its opening echoed another game, Resident Evil.

The Twilight Zone has been seen as an influence by some reviewers. Jeffery commented that Black Mirror's "roots in" the American anthology series "have never been more visible", while Sims noted that "White Bear" is "the most Twilight Zone-y episode of the show", and James Hibberd of Entertainment Weekly said it could even have been an episode of that series. Lyndsey Weber of Vulture made a "post-viewing guide" to Black Mirror, where she included The Twilight Zone episode "Five Characters in Search of an Exit" as "bonus watching" to "White Bear".

== Themes ==
Despite the similarities to real murder cases, David Sims noted the focus is not any single case, arguing that when an "abhorrent crime" occurs people create "totem[s] of hatred and evil" from the figures involved in the crime. He said Brooker examines what he calls the "lurid media frenzy" trend. Lambie, as well as Aubrey Page of Collider, considered it was mainly directed towards tabloids' coverage of criminal cases that turns them into "witch hunts". Simon Cocks of Screen Anarchy agreed it is an allegory of the Internet, but also a discussion on how society processes information and treats shocking news stories. Paste's Roxanne Sancto wrote it is aimed at the media's tendency "to turn horrific news stories into national spectacles, riling people up to the point of mass panic and violence in the process". Alfred Joyner of International Business Times stated "the argument is that in the media notorious criminals must be demonised to appease the public's insatiable appetite to see that 'justice' is served".

James Poniewozik of The New York Times identified vigilantism as a central concept in the story. Writing for Esquire, Corey Atad commented it is about the societal "appetite for punishment", while Sam Parker of The Huffington Post and Andrew Liptak of The Verge considered it represents "a cruel society's fantasy of 'real justice'" and a "perverted justice" respectively. More specifically, it deals with the remote punishment done via the anonymity of the Internet, according to some of TheWrap's staff members and Page. While Sims stated there are parallels between Victoria's suffering and the crime she committed, Joyner considered these parallels to be central to the episode's critique. When her crime is revealed, Joyner wrote, "the construction of the White Bear centre becomes apparent now, as a real-life karmic experience for the general public who wish to see biblical retribution". Mark Monahan of The Telegraph wrote that the episode "mocked, above all, our insatiable, voyeuristic, neo-Medieval thirst for supposedly 'real-life' pain and humiliation repackaged as entertainment". Jeffery stated it depicted how society turns horror into entertainment, and Parker concluded, "The fact Victoria was a murderer allows them to accept her suffering, but it's the mobile phones that allow them to enjoy it—after all, she's just a character on their screens."

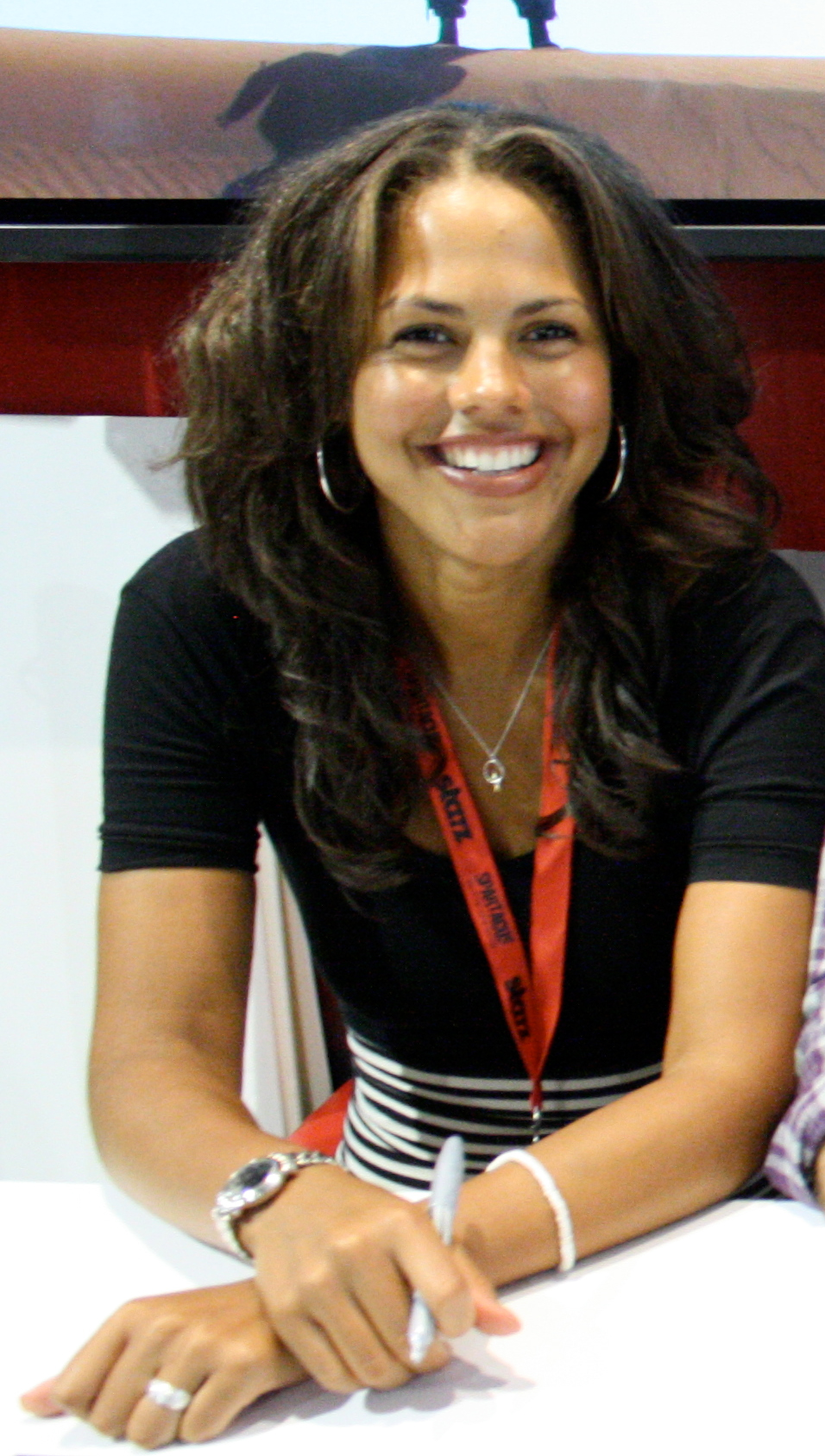
Critics considered Crichlow's character's repeated suffering to be a plot device to evoke sympathy.

Liptak said it portrays people as victims of technology, while Joyner commented it denotes that "the way in which we are spoon-fed an almost constant stream of information through technology has turned us into passive consumers". Joyner believes that Brooker implicates the viewer with the story's credits scene, noting "we're the ones with the smartphones, passively absorbing abuses to human rights and decency, and yet revelling in the image from the safety of the screen". Jeffery and Parker theorised it contains the idea that people are preferring to document life rather than living it, as exemplified by "people who see violence break out ... and decide to film it rather than intervene." Leigh Alexander of Boing Boing said the episode reflects how violence is easily accessed on the Internet and quickly arouses people's attention. She noted, "you can view the episode as a critique of all kinds of themes: Mob mentality, reality television, even the complicated treatment of women in the justice system ... Primarily, though, this episode is a critique of our deep, often-unexamined mass desensitisation, or at least a dread portent of its potential to grow. It aims to ask: To what extent can you stand by and watch horror before you are complicit, punishable?"

Brooker commented that after watching the episode, the viewer feels "sympathetic towards [Victoria] but also repulsed by what [she] did". Tibbetts opined that the episode is "about not torturing people" and Victoria's guilt is irrelevant to whether one should take pleasure from her torture. Sims said Victoria's suffering was shown to make the viewer sympathise with her, but noted it is difficult to do so because she committed an unforgivable crime, although her mental state is not entirely clear because of the fact "her mind has been erased so many times that the crime is barely a memory". Lambie stated it was done to explore "how human empathy breaks down when individuals are reduced to an image on a screen", and concluded, "whether it's directed at the innocent or the guilty, cruelty is still cruelty". Atad asserted it ultimately leads viewers to choose between their "so-called justice and the competing value of empathy". Writing for Sabotage Times, Gareth Dimelow concluded it leaves the viewer to ponder: "If someone has no recollection of their crimes, can they be effectively punished? Does our societal bloodlust for vengeance make us just as dangerous as the criminals we seek to discipline?" GamesRadar's Richard Edwards found that Brooker was able to present a "morally complex idea" without taking a side on the discussion. Sancto felt the episode "plays with the viewer's emotions ... making it all the more difficult to find a moral stance on her story in the end".

Jones interpreted that Victoria is "incredibly remorseful" once she learns who she is, saying that Victoria's knowledge of what she did to the young girl is "obviously destroying her". In contrast, Brooker believes Victoria to only be feeling "confusion and animal fear" as her life is like "a nightmare in which society tells you're a child killer".

Joyner stated the episode uses "the idea of having what the viewers are led to believe as reality exposed as a sham". Alexander suggested this could be interpreted as questioning "the assumptions we bring to the things we see – we can capture nearly any issue from all angles and pin it to virtual glass forever, but still only own a piece of the story, the unknowable remainder filled in by our own preconceptions". Alasdair Stuart of Bleeding Cool commented it "builds on this idea of the reflection that you know is fake but can't look away from and internalizes it". With the plot twist, Stuart said, "we're shown exactly what's been a reflection of the truth all along; everything". He also stated it questions "our own fundamental need to be the hero or heroine of our own story".

== Reception ==
"White Bear" was first broadcast in the United Kingdom on Channel 4 at 10 pm on 18 February 2013. According to the Broadcasters' Audience Research Board, the episode was viewed by an estimated 1.2 million viewers, which was 7.2% of the British audience. This was lower than the second series premiere, "Be Right Back", which was watched by 1.6 million people (9%). Brooker opined that "White Bear" is definitely the episode that provides "the most visceral, holy shit reaction from viewers", while Hibberd deemed it a "fan-favorite".

The episode was very well received and appeared on several lists of the series' best episodes. On the review aggregator website Rotten Tomatoes, it holds an approval rating of 88% based on 17 reviews, with an average rating of 8.20/10. The website's critics consensus reads: "'White Bear' makes up for its blunt social criticism with its intense scare factor and final twist." Sancto deemed it the best episode among the first seven because its theme was presented "in a chilling manner". Page rated it the fourth-best among the thirteen episodes, asserting that it has an "ability to truly disturb" and "has put off many a viewer as spinning on a cheap twist, but despite the fact that the episode's impact does turn on a reveal, there's little in the episode that even feels remotely done before." Mat Elfring of GameSpot placed it fifth out of thirteen, labelling it "the most successful horror episode [of the series] to date". Atad ranked it seven out of thirteen, saying it "begins a dystopian horror reminiscent of 28 Days Later, but where it ends up is far more disturbing". Out of the thirteen, Hibberd ranked it eighth, highlighting its plot twist and noting that "most [would] rank this episode much higher; I just happened to like the rest of the episodes better". Moreover, Stuart said it "may be one of the best hours of TV produced [in 2013]". He emphasised how it transits from "John Wyndham stuff" to horror and then action, and commended its final twist. He concluded: "The last fifteen minutes of White Bear are amongst the most blisteringly angry pieces of television I've ever seen."

It is considered to have "one of the most shocking twists on Black Mirror", as Jenelle Riley of Variety put it, before the third series aired. Writing before the third series, Margaret Lyons of The New York Times said it is "the most outright disturbing" episode of Black Mirror. Right after it aired, Cocks deemed it "the single darkest episode of Black Mirror so far" and considered its twist to be "nothing short of genius". Sims stated that it "is, by a significant margin, the most disturbing episode Black Mirror has produced". Although he praised the twist as "a smart one, brilliantly concealed and smartly revealed", he criticised it because "once the point is made, it is made over and over again." Lambie praised its "fearsome pace" and highlighted "its subtle approach", with sparse dialogue, that gives "the events and performances greater impact". He concluded: "its horror-infused drama leaves us unsure whom we can trust or what will happen next, and its last act is truly gut-wrenching". Monahan wrote that the twist was unpredictable and the episode "was an exciting and efficient piece of narrative rug-pulling".

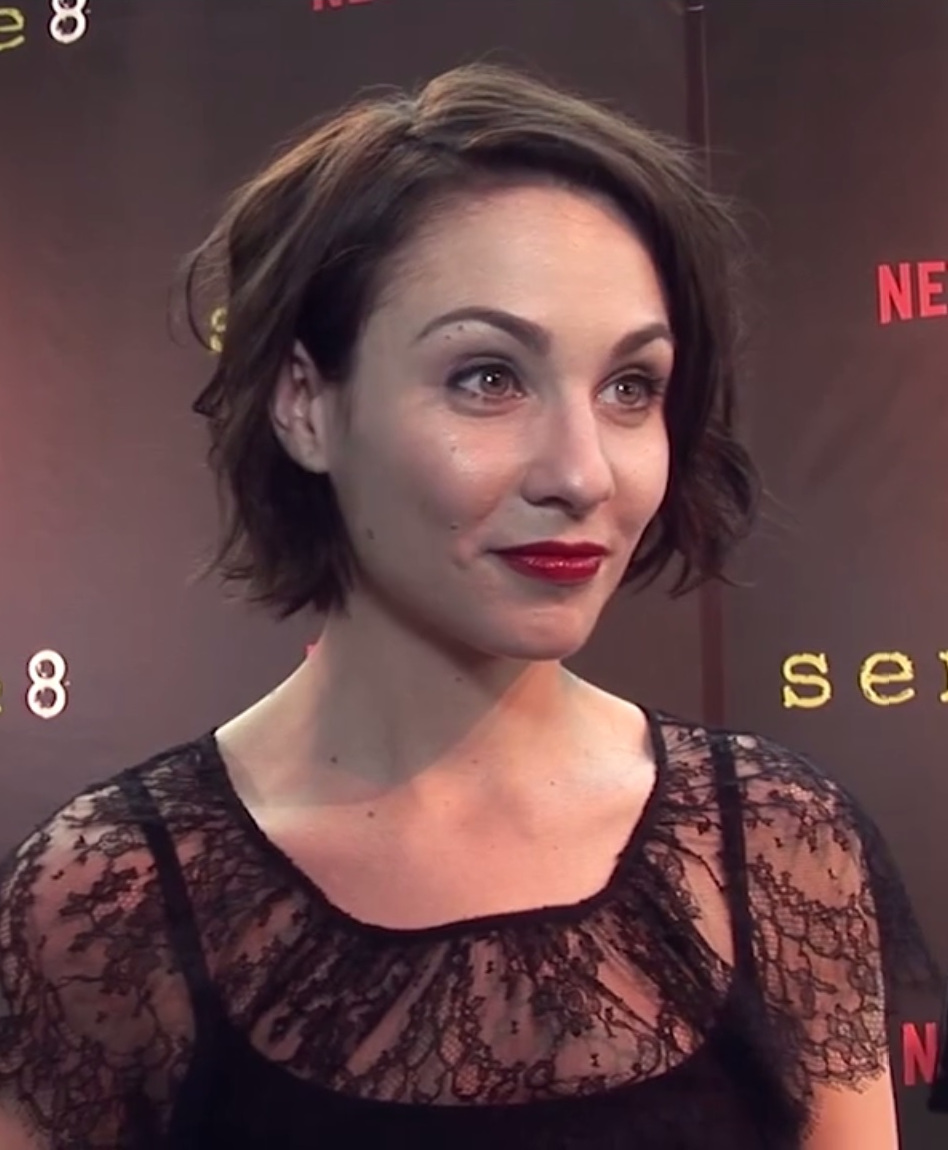
Tuppence Middleton's performance was highly praised.

Regarding the acting and the characters, Sims and Monahan praised Middleton's performance. By contrast, Crichlow's role was considered to be repetitive. Monahan stated she just wailed, and Parker called it "a harrowing performance with no arc or resolutions, just sheer fear and distress". Lambie said: "If there's a criticism to be levelled at the first two-thirds of White Bear, it's that Victoria's carried helplessly along by events." Simon said Crichlow's potential was wasted because of the script. Jeffery criticised the fact "Victoria maintains one emotional level across the episode ... she's tearful, panicked and terrified throughout", but he remarked it was not Crichlow's fault, while praising Middleton and Smiley as "uniformly excellent". Cocks was more favourable, praising Crichlow's commitment to her performance. He also attributed to her performance "one of the episode's greatest accomplishments ... how much it makes audience members feel as though they are in the position of [Victoria]". Edwards asserted she gave a "tour de force performance" that is "an excellent, convincing portrayal of a frightened, confused woman".

Some reviewers had mixed feelings about the episode. Jane Simon of the Daily Mirror said that "White Bear" lacked the "instant emotional tug" of the series opener. She commented that, a third of the way through the episode, she had lost hope that it would conclude effectively, "[...] the acting was unbelievable, the script was riddled with horror-film cliches, the violence was a bit over the top [...]", but that by the end she was positively surprised, calling it "another work of dark and twisted genius from Mr. Brooker". Joyner praised it as "stylistically ... breath-taking" with "intense action", but felt "the themes come across as particularly flat" and "hardly original". He was disappointed until the twist, and concludes that Brooker has "crafted an hour of television more bold and daring than I've seen in a long time". Jeffery said "this is Black Mirror as full-blooded horror" and that it never gets boring, while criticising the characters and the final sequence as "a little overlong and obvious". TheWrap's staff was divided; while some found it has a good social critique, others considered it to be "least effective when it goes for horror". Although Parker compared the first 45 minutes to "a low-budget, low-quality version of 28 Days Later", full of "horror movie clichés", he realised that was "the whole point". He was positive to its societal criticism and wrote: "So the reason it all felt like a rubbish horror movie for 45 minutes is because that's what it was, just with a real person in the centre of it." It was ranked eleventh out of the thirteen episodes by Charles Bramesco of Vulture, who said its message is "lost beneath a simplistic twist that pulls a switcheroo and [it] fails to do much else".

== See also ==
- "Judgment Night" – a 1959 episode of The Twilight Zone with a similar premise and twist
- The Running Man – a 1987 film in which paid assassins hunt and kill prisoners as part of a television game show
- The Truman Show – a 1998 film in which the unsuspecting protagonist stars in a reality television program
