= Fast Girls =

2012 film by Regan Hall

- Theatrical release poster
- Directed by: Regan Hall
- Written by: Jay Basu; Noel Clarke; Roy Williams
- Produced by: Damian Jones
- Starring: Lenora Crichlow; Lily James; Lorraine Burroughs; Dominique Tipper; Lashana Lynch; Bradley James; Noel Clarke; Rupert Graves
- Edited by: Lewis Albrow
- Music by: Richard Canavan
- Distributed by: StudioCanal
- Release date: 15 June 2012 (United Kingdom)
- Running time: 91 minutes
- Country: United Kingdom
- Language: English
- Box office: $1.1 million

Fast Girls is a 2012 British sports drama film directed by Regan Hall, and produced by Damian Jones. The film was written by Jay Basu, Roy Williams, and Noel Clarke. The film stars Lenora Crichlow, Lily James, Bradley James, and Rupert Graves. The film follows the story of two women and their race and personal differences as they become professional sprinters and join the British relay team for a World Championship event. The film was released in the United Kingdom on 15 June 2012.

It had originally been intended to base the athletics competition in the film on the 2012 Summer Olympics. Due to tight legal restrictions on the use of Olympic trademarks, the International Olympic Committee disallowed any reference to the Olympic Games in the film, and the script had to be re-written to make the competition a fictional one. Released a month before the 2012 Summer Olympics, Fast Girls had its world premiere in London on 7 June 2012 and was released eight days later in the United Kingdom. The film received positive reviews from critics and earned $1 million at the worldwide box office.

== Plot ==
Sprinter Shania Andrews, who lives in a London council estate with her aunt and problematic sister, trains with a fallen-from-grace older coach on a dilapidated track in the suburbs of London. Her diligent training comes to fruition where she wins the 200m dash against the well-known, entitled runner Lisa Temple at a regional track meet. When Shania wins the final heat, the UK Track and Field National Team approaches her as a leg in the 4 x 100m relay team.

While three other team members accept her into the fold, Temple holds a grudge against Andrews from the last race. The rivalry gets toxic and upsets Andrews, and the first exhibition indoor race turns into a disaster, as she had stayed up the previous night, falling back into her past self-destruction behaviour with her sister and dubious friends at the government housing complex. Shania and Lisa (anchor leg and presumed fastest runner) botch the handoff technique and the runners descend into recriminations.

Shania decides to focus on the solo 200m and abandons the relay team in anger much to the dismay of the coach, who is trying to patch things up between the two rivals. Upon arriving back home, her aunt has decided to throw Shania and her partying sister out of the apartment after an all-night party was held there. Shania, now homeless, has to rely on her old coach for training and housing as she works to stay on the team as a single event runner.

After an all-girls night out, relations thaw a bit between the runners, but Shania still refuses to rejoin the team as the 3rd leg. The relay team is formalized, with older runner and British legend Trix Warren as the replacement runner.

At the world championships, held in London before the 2012 Olympics, both Shania and Lisa have disappointing position finishes in the 200m open race, despite personal-best times, as they are easily beaten by dominant US and Jamaican teams. Lisa's father, a past Gold Olympian and UK Olympic chairman, is angry and disappointed. To add insult to injury, Trix tears her hamstring in her 100 metre heat and the team is without a leg of the relay. Trix and Shania have a heart to heart, with the veteran runner lecturing the younger on lost opportunities. Shania rejoins the relay squad but the UK team, yet again, has issues with their underhand handoff technique which takes crucial time off the team's position in the semi-final heat. The UK comes in fourth and does not make the final slot, and the 2 runners end up in a physical fight over the handoff issues.

Due to an out-of-lane technical fault, however, the French 3rd place finishers are disqualified and the UK slips into the finals despite the problems of the runners. However, Shania is thrown off the team by the UK Track and Field oversight committee led by Lisa's father and the team will most likely have to default. Lisa, struggling with her domineering father, is convinced by Shania to confront him and the committee to allow her back in or else Lisa will also resign from the UK team. David Temple is stunned and speechless at his daughter's strong-willed demands and the conversation is left open-ended.

Determined to fix their relationship and their handoff issues, Shania and Lisa work on their technique in a local parking garage. It becomes apparent that the problem is Shania's approach speed and handoff to Lisa, the anchor. Lisa comes to the conclusion that the traditional ordering of "fastest is lastest" would work better and is more appropriate. The revelation proves successful as both Shania and Lisa perfect the overhand handoff technique (a faster but less reliable method of transferring the baton). In the final heat, the movie focuses on the 1-2-3-Anchor handoffs in anticipation of another dropped baton. To the UK coach's dismay, the overhand handoff gets the millisecond needed to pull off the UK photo-finish win over the US and Jamaican teams.

== Cast ==
- Lenora Crichlow as Shania Andrews
- Lily James as Lisa Temple
- Bradley James as Carl
- Noel Clarke as Tommy
- Rupert Graves as David Temple
- Lashana Lynch as Belle
- Jake Pennington as Leo Temple
- Phil Davis as Brian
- Lorraine Burroughs as Trix
- Tiana Benjamin as Tara
- Dominique Tipper as Sarah
- Hannah Frankson as Rachel
- Jonathan Illori as Usain Bolt

== Production ==
=== Development ===
It had originally been intended to base the athletics competition in the film on the 2012 Summer Olympics. Due to tight legal restrictions on the use of Olympic trademarks, the International Olympic Committee disallowed any reference to the Olympic Games in the film, and the script had to be re-written to make the competition a fictional one. Co-writer Noel Clarke took inspiration from Rocky, saying that if you made a film about any sport you'd want it to be the equivalent of what Rocky was to boxing. He also noted that the movie was deliberately designed to be released just before the Olympics, as a feel-good film in which Britain did really well.

=== Casting ===
Casting was conducted in Regent's Park in London, where producer Damian Jones and first time movie director Regan Hall chose the four actresses who would become the 4×100 metre relay team in the film. The aim was to find actresses who would be believable on screen as athletes. The athletic extras in the film are from athletic clubs in London, Edinburgh and Loughborough. Lily James wasn't able to participate in the audition in Regent's Park, but instead made a video recording of herself running for the casting.

=== Filming ===
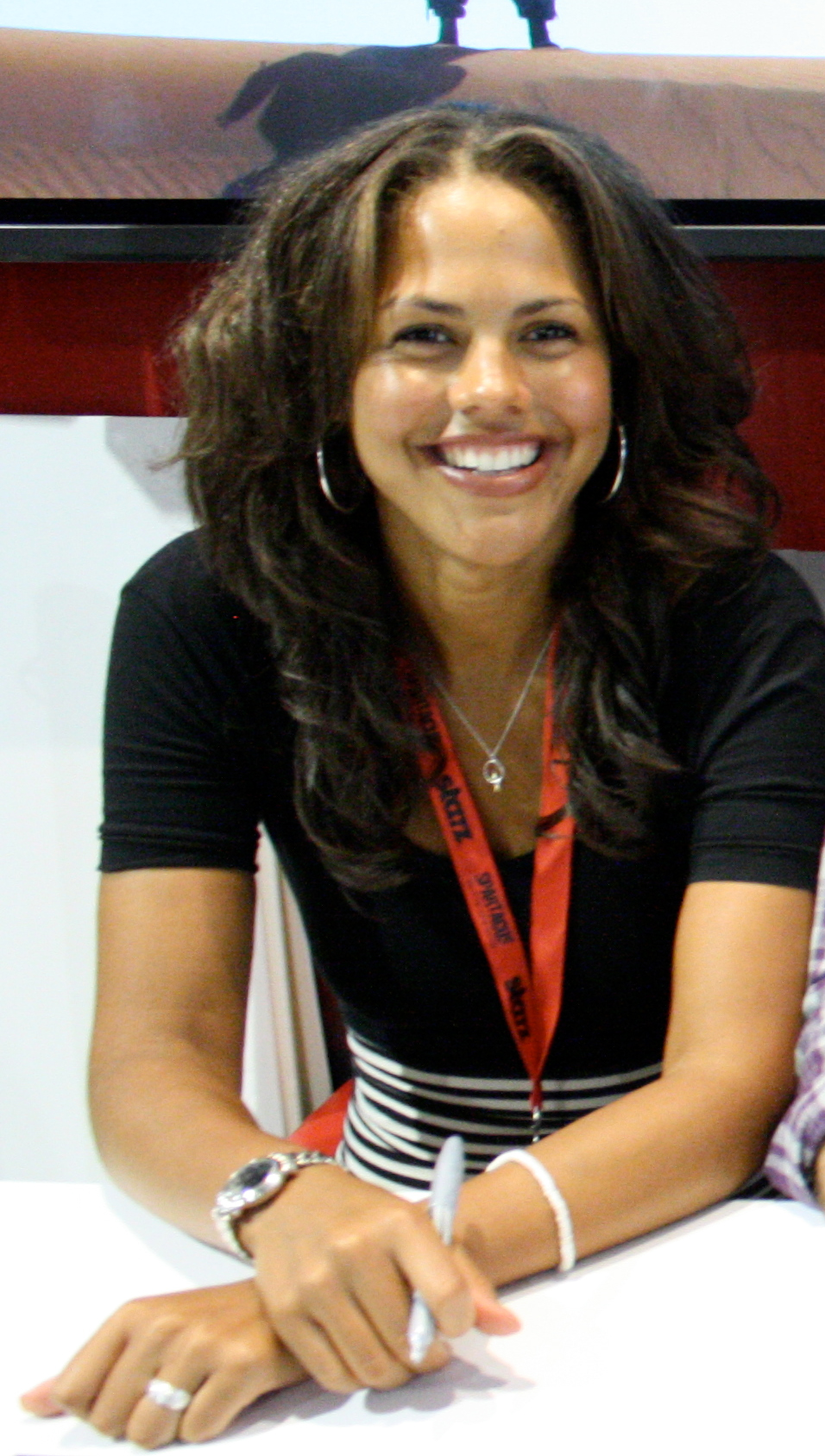
Lenora Crichlow's ankle injury necessitated the use of body doubles and camera techniques

The actresses portraying athletes completed six weeks of intensive training at Crystal Palace National Sports Centre prior to the beginning of the shooting phase of the film. The training sessions involved up to a thousand sit-ups each day, six days a week.

Crichlow was pleased that the film features a staple feature of sports movies: a training montage.

The GB Qualifiers scene was filmed in Queen Elizabeth II track, Enfield. The Championships in Barcelona were filmed inside Lea Valley Athletic Centre, also in Enfield. The derelict track where Lenora's character trains is filmed in Feltham, West London.

== Promotion and release ==
The film was launched at the Toronto International Film Festival in 2011 as Hall's first full-length feature. Members of the film's cast were promoting the film at the 2012 Cannes Film Festival in order to secure an international distributor for the movie, with the rights pre-acquired for the UK distribution by StudioCanal UK at the time of the film's launch.

The premiere of the film took place in London's Leicester Square a few weeks ahead of the 2012 Summer Olympics, also to be held in London. The red carpet was not traditionally plain, but instead had track markings on it to simulate an athletics track. Guests attending the premiere included British athlete Dame Kelly Holmes. It went on general release in the UK on 15 June 2012.

== Reception ==
On Rotten Tomatoes the film has a score of 83% based on reviews from 23 critics.

Leslie Felperin reviewed the film for Variety when it aired at Cannes. She felt that the portrait of the environments in the film felt credible and while the film was also technically solid, it was quite obvious when stand-in athletes were used in long shots. Simon Reynolds saw the film for Digital Spy, saying that while it was entertaining, it was also cheesy and won't be considered a classic in the future. He gave the film three out of five stars. Mark Adams gave the film four out of five stars for the Daily Mirror, calling it an uplifting bit of pre-Olympics entertainment.

=== Accolades ===
Award	Category	Result
14th Pyongyang International Film Festival	Best Photography	Won

== See also ==
- List of films about the sport of athletics
