= Peeple =

Peeple may refer to:

- Peeple (company), an Austin, Texas-based company and their internet-based peephole product of the same name
- Peeple (mobile application), a mobile application that allows people to rate other people

== See also ==
- Peeples, an American surname
- People
