= Peeples =

Peeples is a surname. Notable people with the surname include:

- Aubrey Peeples (born 1993), American actress
- Clifford Peeples (born c. 1969), pastor in Northern Ireland associated with Ulster loyalism
- George Peeples (born 1943), American basketball player
- Joe Henry Peeples, Jr. (1914–1988), American politician
- Nia Peeples (born 1961), American singer and actress
- Raymond Peeples, American politician
- Samuel A. Peeples (1917–1997), American writer
- William Peeples (died 2004), American jazz drummer

== See also ==
- Peeple (disambiguation)
- People (disambiguation)
