= Nosedive (Black Mirror) =

- Black Mirror episode
- Lacie (Bryce Dallas Howard) gives a rating using her phone. The episode's pastel colours distinguish it from most Black Mirror episodes.
- Episode no.: Series 3 Episode 1
- Directed by: Joe Wright
- Story by: Charlie Brooker
- Teleplay by: Michael Schur; Rashida Jones
- Cinematography by: Seamus McGarvey
- Editing by: Valerio Bonelli
- Original release date: 21 October 2016
- Running time: 63 minutes

Guest appearances
- Bryce Dallas Howard as Lacie Pound; Alice Eve as Naomi Blestow; Cherry Jones as Susan; James Norton as Ryan Pound; Alan Ritchson as Paul; Daisy Haggard as Bets; Susannah Fielding as Carol; Michaela Coel as Airport Stewardess; Demetri Goritsas as Hansen; Kadiff Kirwan as Chester; Ṣọpẹ́ Dìrísù as Man in Jail; Andrew Roux as Electro Station Attendant

Episode chronology
← Previous "White Christmas"	Next → "Playtest"

"Nosedive" is the first episode in the third series of the British science fiction anthology series Black Mirror. Michael Schur and Rashida Jones wrote the teleplay for the episode, based on a story by series creator and co-showrunner Charlie Brooker, while Joe Wright acted as director. It premiered on Netflix on 21 October 2016, alongside the rest of the third series. The episode is set in a world where people can rate each other from one to five stars, using their smartphones, for every interaction they have, which can impact their socioeconomic status. Lacie (Bryce Dallas Howard) is a young woman overly obsessed with her ratings; she finds an opportunity to elevate her ratings greatly and move into a more luxurious residence after being chosen by her popular, highly rated childhood friend Naomi (Alice Eve) as the maid of honour for her wedding.

Under Netflix, the episode was given a much larger budget than the previous episodes of the programme, when it had been under Channel 4. Brooker wrote an outline for the episode, then Schur wrote the first half of the episode and Jones wrote the latter. Production was undertaken in a manner similar to a short film; "Nosedive" was filmed in South Africa, with Seamus McGarvey as director of photography and Joel Collins and James Foster as the production designers. The tone of the episode is less bleak and more comedic than other Black Mirror episodes, with the ending significantly more positive than in episodes of the programme's prior two series.

The episode received mainly positive reviews and is middling in critics' lists of Black Mirror episodes, qualitatively. The pastel visual aesthetics were widely praised, along with Max Richter's soundtrack and Howard's performance. A criticism from several reviewers was the episode's predictability and ending, though the script and comedic undertones were praised by some. Many critics noted the similarity of the episode to real-world app Peeple and China's Social Credit System, along with fictional works about social media with themes of gender and obsession with image. The episode won a Royal Television Society Craft & Design Award. It was nominated for several awards, including a Screen Actors Guild Award nomination for Howard and a Primetime Emmy Award nomination for McGarvey. A board game Nosedive, based on the episode, was released in 2018.

== Plot ==
Society has embraced a technology wherein everyone shares their daily activities and user experiences through eye implants and mobile devices where one rates their interactions with others on a scale from one to five stars, cumulatively affecting everyone's socioeconomic status.

Lacie Pound (Bryce Dallas Howard) seeks to raise her 4.2 rating to 4.5 for a discount on a luxury apartment at Pelican Cove, as her current lease is expiring and the agent warns that units are in high demand; however, despite her attempts to be outgoing and pleasant, her rating has stagnated. Lacie talks to a consultant who suggests gaining favour from very highly rated people. Lacie uploads a photograph of Mr. Rags, a ragdoll that she and her childhood friend Naomi (Alice Eve) made together. Naomi, who is currently rated 4.8, rates the photo five stars and calls Lacie to announce her engagement, inviting Lacie to deliver a wedding speech as the maid of honour. Learning that the wedding will be attended by hundreds of guests whom all have a rating of 4.7 or above, Lacie accepts the invitation and impulsively commits to the apartment, anticipating that their high ratings will easily secure her the necessary 4.5 score.

On the day of her flight, several mishaps cause people to rate Lacie negatively. This drops her rating down to 4.183. At the airport, her flight is cancelled and she cannot book a seat on an alternate flight without being a 4.2 or above. This agitates Lacie and she causes a scene, upon which security penalizes her by putting her on "double damage" and subtracting a full point for 24 hours. Because of her low rating, Lacie can only rent an older car to drive to the wedding, which she cannot recharge when it runs out of power. She is forced to hitchhike with Susan (Cherry Jones), a truck driver with a rating of 1.4. Susan reveals she used to be a 4.6, and tells Lacie that she used to care about her rating until her late husband was passed over for vital cancer treatment because his score was deemed not high enough. Susan says she is much freer without obsessing over ratings.

While Lacie is on the route to the wedding, Naomi tells her to not come, as her severely reduced rating will negatively impact Naomi's own ratings. Enraged, Lacie reaches the wedding and sneaks in during the reception. She grabs the microphone and starts giving the speech she had written but begins insulting Naomi, revealing that as teenagers she enabled Lacie's bulimia and slept with her high school boyfriend. Security attempts to apprehend her, upon which Lacie grabs a knife and threatens to behead Mr. Rags. Still on double damage, the guests downvote her in droves, causing her rating to drop below one star. Lacie is imprisoned with her eye implants removed, but is genuinely happy for the first time in a long time. She and the man in the cell opposite hers (Sope Dirisu), realizing they can now speak without worrying about being rated, gleefully hurl insults at each other.

== Production ==
External videos
- Black Mirror – Season 3 The trailer for series three of Black Mirror.
- Black Mirror – Nosedive Featurette; Brief commentary by Charlie Brooker and Bryce Dallas Howard.

"Nosedive" is the first episode of the third series of Black Mirror; all six episodes in this series were released on Netflix simultaneously on 21 October 2016. Brooker says it was selected to be the season premiere "partly to slightly ease people in", at Netflix's recommendation. Alongside "San Junipero", "Nosedive" was first shown in 2016 ahead of its Netflix release at the Toronto International Film Festival. Two days prior to the series' release on Netflix, Brooker hinted that "Nosedive" is "a pastel, playful satire about modern insecurity."

Whilst series one and two of Black Mirror were shown on Channel 4 in the UK, in September 2015 Netflix commissioned the series for 12 episodes (split into two series of six episodes), and in March 2016 it outbid Channel 4 for the rights to distributing the third series, with a bid of $40 million. Due to its move to Netflix, the show had a larger budget than in previous series, which one critic suggests is responsible for the "impressive line-up" that was noted by many reviewers. Another critic called this episode the show's "most ambitious yet"; due to its larger episode order, series 3 was also able to vary its genre and tone more than previous series. One reviewer also noted that "Nosedive" contained "only American characters".

In November 2016, to tie in with the episode, Netflix released a tongue-in-cheek app called Rate Me. The app allows users to rate people, by their Twitter handle, and view their own rating and the ratings of others.

=== Conception and writing ===
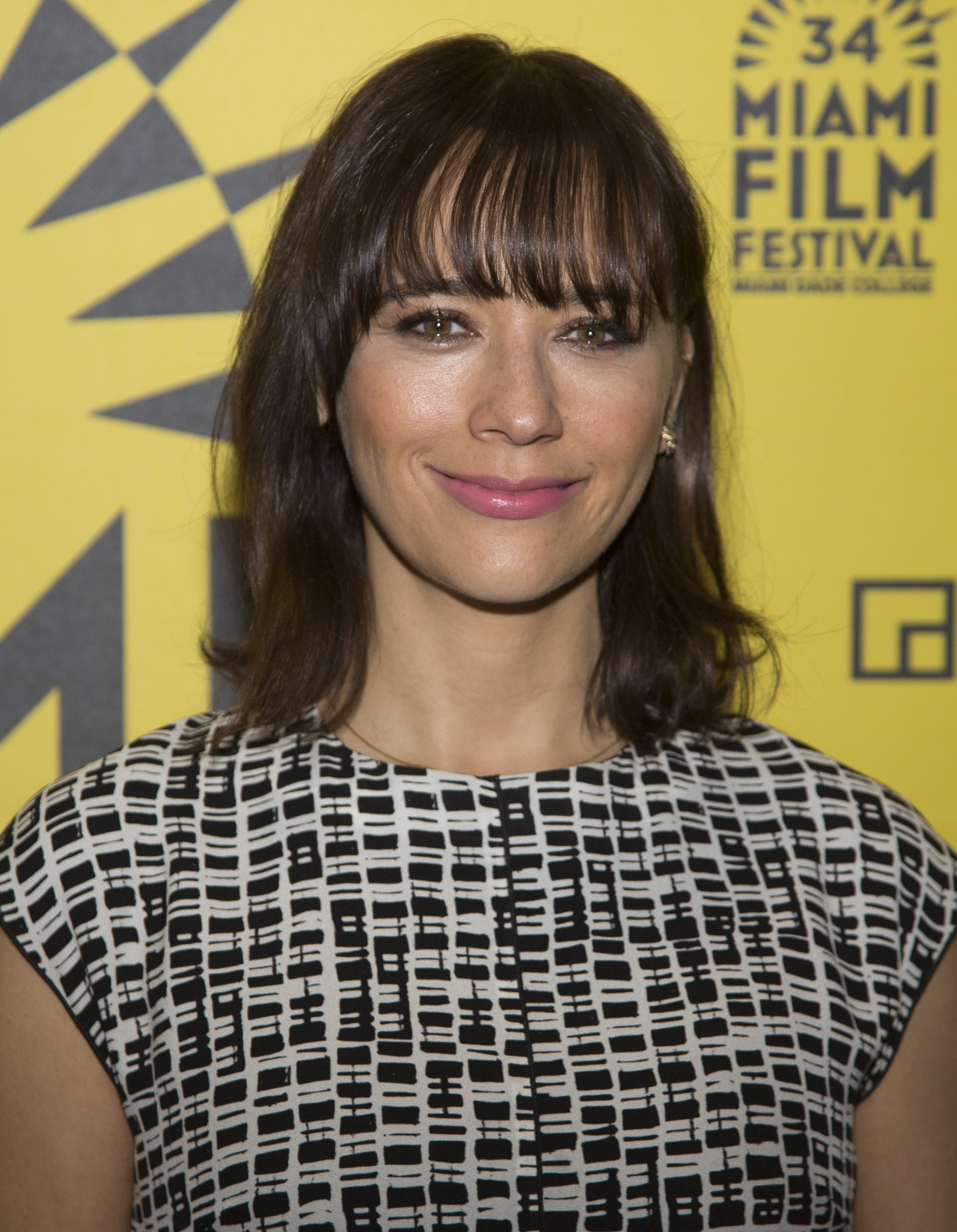
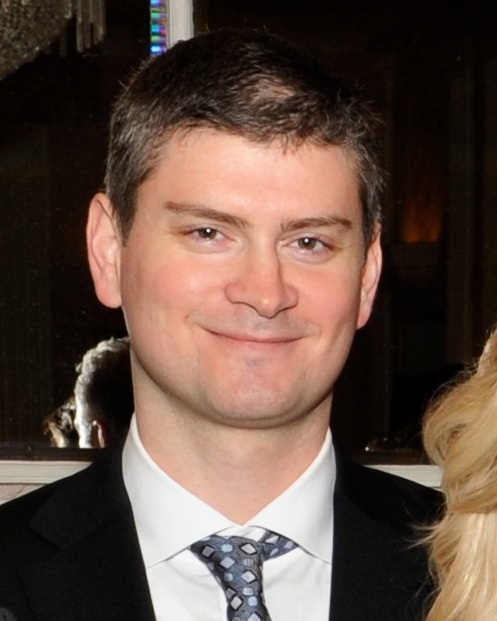
Rashida Jones (left) and Michael Schur (right) co-wrote the script.

The episode is based on an idea by series creator Charlie Brooker for a movie; he and executive producer Annabel Jones pitched the idea to several movie companies in the United States after the first series of Black Mirror, but it was not commissioned. The original idea was of a comedy similar to Brewster's Millions, focused on a high status person trying to reduce their ranking in 24 hours. Later, Brooker wrote either a three or four page outline for the episode, wanting it to be "comedic, darkly". This version took inspiration from 1987 film Planes, Trains and Automobiles, in which the character is on a journey—for "Nosedive", this was initially a character travelling to an important work presentation.

Rashida Jones and Michael Schur wrote the episode. Known for comedy and sitcoms, the pair had previously worked together on many shows, including Parks and Recreation, but had never written anything together before "Nosedive". A fan of Brooker's works, Rashida Jones had been in contact with him for a few years beforehand and after the programme's move to Netflix, he suggested that she could write an episode. Schur was also a fan of Black Mirror and Rashida Jones suggested that they could co-write the episode. With Jones and Schur on board, the main character changed from someone focused on playing the ratings system to a people-pleaser, the work presentation was changed to a wedding and the idea of Lacie having a childhood talisman was introduced. Lacie's brother was originally an ex-boyfriend.

Schur wrote the first half of the episode (up to Lacie beginning her travel in a rented car), while Rashida Jones wrote the second half, and the two then combined their scripts. In the initial draft, the episode ended with Lacie's work presentation going viral and her achieving fame. The final version of the ending showed Lacie in a jail cell, the rating device removed from her, allowing her to find freedom. An unused idea was that of rage rooms, where characters would go to destroy things to let out their anger.

In 2016, Schur had an account on Twitter but not Facebook or Instagram, as "there's a bunch of strangers talking shit about you in there", and Jones expressed a similarly negative attitude, stating "I do have very strong, very conflicted feelings about rating systems and social media." Brooker notes that "you are rewarded for having a more extreme opinion" on social media; in the episode, as on the internet, almost all ratings given are either one or five stars. Similarly, Schur opines that social media causes people to exaggerate their behaviour, particularly their rudeness.

Jones believes that the episode, as with all Black Mirror episodes, "pushes you into the near future", while Schur considers it to be more of a "parallel reality". Brooker has described the episode as "like a cross between Pleasantville and The Truman Show". Jones says the belief that "women are taught to be liked, and men are taught to be powerful", credited to Sheryl Sandberg, is relevant to the episode, with Schur agreeing that Lacie's gender is important to the story, though Schur notes that edited images on social media are causing negative body image issues for men as well.

=== Filming ===
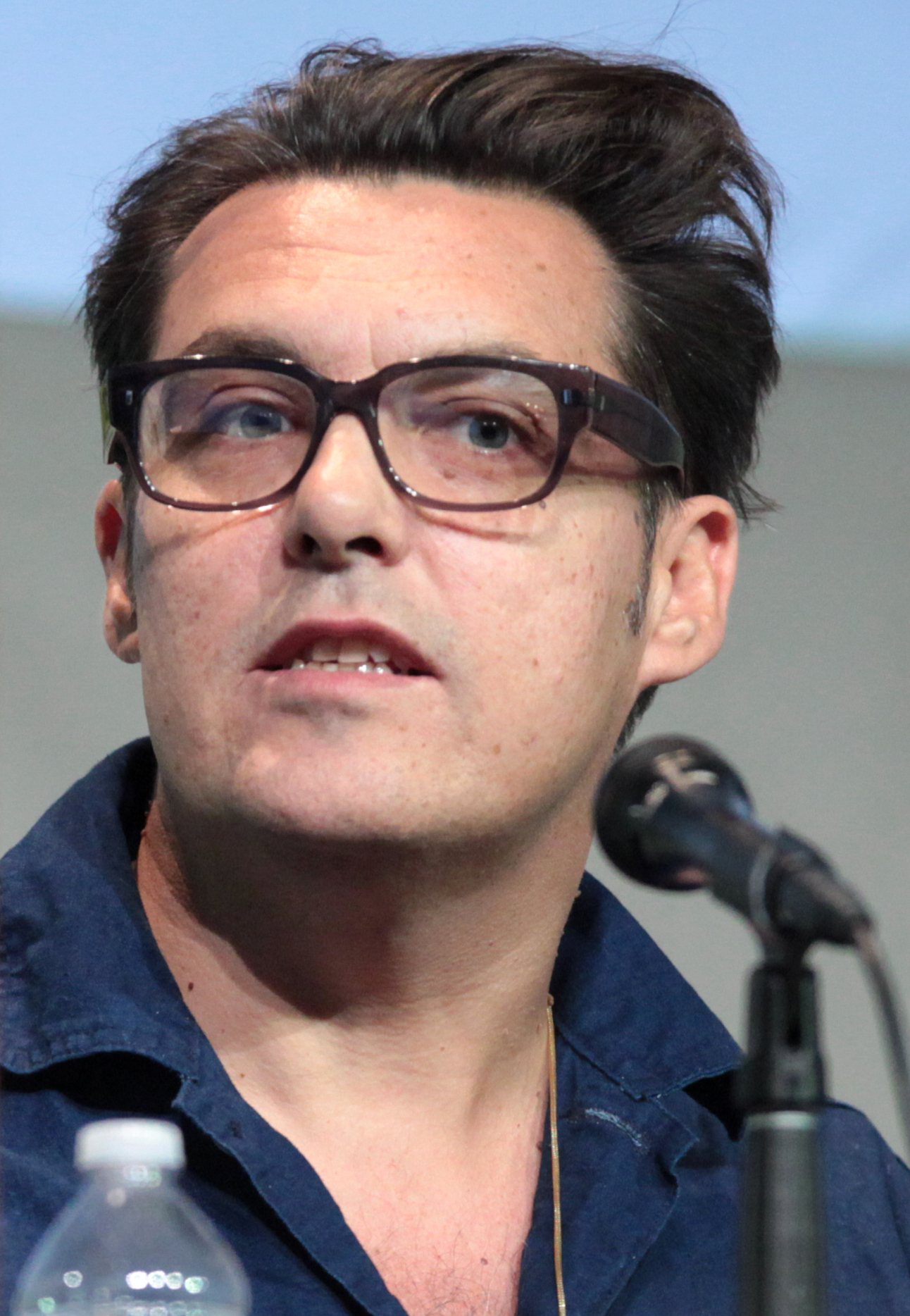
Joe Wright, the episode's director

The episode was the third in series three to be filmed. Joe Wright directed the episode, Seamus McGarvey was director of photography and the production designers, working for VFX company Painting Practice, were Joel Collins and James Foster. The episode was shot in four weeks in Knysna, South Africa, a coastal town five hours (by car) from Cape Town chosen as it felt like an American coastal town. Series three episode "San Junipero" was also filmed in South Africa.

In an interview with Variety, McGarvey noted that the episode was shot in 4K resolution at the request of Netflix. He said the colour scheme was a mixture of duck-egg blue, "peppermint green" and "strange peach colors", and that props and "even the drinks people are drinking" were chosen with care to create a "sickly pastel feel". Wright said that he made almost no changes to the script's dialogue. Brooker has said that Wright's pastel treatment was a "very strong visual idea that we had not foreseen".

Brooker pointed out that directors of Black Mirror episodes (in this case, Wright) have more "power" than in serialised television shows, as "it is like making a short film", and he said that Wright had "been feeling quite bruised after doing Pan, and [Black Mirror] was a good thing for him to get his teeth into which wasn't the full five-year commitment of a movie". McGarvey had previously worked with Wright. Watching rushes from the filming, Brooker was initially sceptical about Wright's saccharine style, but began to understand it as the filming progressed and the music was added. The scenes in which Lacie is driving utilise a computer-generated landscape designed by Dan May, the episode's art director. She was initially planned to drive through multiple landscapes such as a desert, but this was changed for budget reasons.

Bryce Dallas Howard plays Lacie, the episode's main character. She was suggested by Wright, who auditioned her a decade previously for Atonement. Howard gained 30 pounds (14 kg) for the role, saying in an interview with Marie Claire that body shaming is a "huge part of the subtext of the story". She chose a laugh for Lacie which mixed "fear", "disingenuousness" and "depression". Howard first joined social media during Thanksgiving 2015 and was approached with the treatment of the episode a fortnight later, in December 2015.

=== Music ===
Chosen by Wright to compose the episode's soundtrack, Max Richter is a self-described "conservatoire, university-trained classical composer". Richter first met the director, Joe Wright, in London before the shooting of the episode had been completed and began coming up with ideas for the score. Richter aimed to "support" the episode's display of "incredible anxiety hovering beneath this smiley surface ... while at the same time not flattening out the emotionality of it", commenting in an interview that Wright's camerawork had a "dream-like quality" and that Brooker's "story was fantastic".

In another interview, Richter said he was aiming for the episode to have "warmth and a fairytale quality throughout" with "darkness underneath it", and notes that his composition was based on "the sentiment and the emotional trajectory of the characters". Richter also composed the sound effects which play when one character rates another, and incorporated these sounds into the score itself.

== Analysis ==
Adam Chitwood commented in Collider that Joe Wright deviated from his typical style, with visuals that focus on the characters. The world is "extremely curated" and appears perfect, wrote Architectural Digest's Shelli Nicole, reflecting the theme of "popularity and validation from social media". Pastel colours—"soft and superficially sweet pinks, greens, and blues"—conceal the darkness in the world.

A Business Insider article by Erin Brodwin argued that Lacie falls victim to the hedonic treadmill. Despite momentary happiness when receiving a high rating, Lacie is "lonely and unsatisfied". Brodwin pointed out that scientific studies concur with Lacie's experience, because there is no correlation between using social media and being happy in the long-term.

=== Comparisons to other media ===
Several critics compared the episode to a 2014 episode of Community, "App Development and Condiments", which features an app where users assign each other "Meow Meow Beenz" ratings on a scale from one to five; Jack Shepherd of The Independent noted that both episodes "critically [analyse] people's obsession with stature on social media platforms with rating systems". Other reviewers compared "Nosedive" to the mobile application Peeple, in which users could rate one another, that garnered immediate backlash upon its release. Brooker said in an interview that he was not aware of the Community episode when he came up with the idea for "Nosedive", but that he did see advertising for Peeple during pre-production, initially thinking it would turn out to be marketing for a comedy show, and he considered whether or not they should still produce the episode. The episode has also been compared to the 2003 novel Down and Out in the Magic Kingdom, as each work explores a link between social approval and power.

Manuel Betancourt of Pacific Standard explained how "Nosedive" fits with other portrayals of social media in television and film, comparing it to 2017 films The Circle and Ingrid Goes West, which both explore negative aspects of social media. Betancourt said that historically, women have been portrayed as victims of technology, a pattern which these works fit. For instance, Ingrid and Lacie are both obsessed with coming across as perfect online. In contrast, male characters are traditionally the voice of reason: in these works, Lacie's brother Ryan, Mercer (The Circle) and Taylor's husband (Ingrid Goes West) serve this purpose. The androgyny of "Nosedive" character Susan is linked to her disdain for social media. Betancourt wrote that these characterisations do not accord with research on how men and women use technology, where some studies report that men have more emotional investment in positive feedback on social media. However, "Nosedive" shows people of all genders placing importance in social media, leading Betancourt to call it "perhaps the most keen-eyed critique [...] of recent titles". An episode of The Orville released the same year features a similar idea, with the ship visiting a planet where people can rate each other, services and new products.

Critics also noted the inclusion of Easter eggs within Black Mirror – small details referring to other episodes. In "Nosedive", a social media post from Michael Callow reads, "Just got thrown out of the zoo again :(", a joke based on Callow having intercourse with a pig in "The National Anthem". Brooker has described this Easter egg as his favourite in series three. Another reference to that episode is the fictional show Sea of Tranquility; in "The National Anthem", a special effects expert mentions having worked on the show, while in "Nosedive", Lacie hitchhikes with fans of the show. Additionally, in "Hated in the Nation", a news ticker contains the term "Reputelligent", which is the name of the company that Lacie consults for advice about her rating.

=== Comparisons to credit ratings ===
"Nosedive" was widely compared to China's Social Credit System, a government initiative which began pilot projects in 2014, initially using private systems such as Sesame Credit. The state projects were implemented differently by local governments, but each collected data on citizens in order to assign them an overall score. An example plan saw the scores determine whether a citizen would be allowed to take out a loan or what quality of school their child would go to. Actions such as defaulting on a loan or being critical of the government would decrease a person's score. By the time "Nosedive" was released, the Sesame Credit system, which assigned users scores between 350 and 950, allowed some people with high scores to rent vehicles without a deposit, or pay to skip hospital queues. Furthermore, a person's score in Sesame Credit was dependent on the scores of the people in their social circle.

The proposed and existing systems were widely compared to the episode as a whole. For example, the apartment discount Lacie hopes for is similar to how high-rated people under Sesame Credit could rent cars without a deposit. Additionally, Lacie's ejection from the airport is reminiscent of the system's control over who can partake in some forms of transport.

Brooker has commented on "Nosedive" and the Social Credit System. He joked in an interview, "I promise you we didn't sell the idea to the Chinese government!" About seeing the concept of the episode come to life in the real world, Brooker said: "It was quite trippy". He commented that a key difference between China's plans and the one in "Nosedive" is "that there's a central government assessing things. Being state-controlled, it feels even more sinister". He said the Social Credit System "sounds like an attempt to make the population behave in a particular way". In November 2016, the Facebook page for Black Mirror shared an article in The Washington Post about the Social Credit System. (Note: The article shared was the following: Denyer, Simon (22 October 2016). "China's plan to organize its society relies on 'big data' to rate everyone". The Washington Post.)

Julien Migozzi found similarities between the episode and the segregation that South Africans face under credit score systems.

== Reception ==
Adam Mosseri, the CEO of social network Instagram, said he was inspired by "Nosedive" to test the hiding of "likes" on the Instagram service starting in 2019, recognising the negative connotations that keeping the number of "likes" easily visible had on some users' behaviour.

The episode was parodied in the 2017 Saturday Night Live sketch "Five Stars". It features Aziz Ansari and Bobby Moynihan desperately trying to impress each other on an Uber ride to boost each other's ratings. The sketch explicitly mentions Black Mirror, with both characters saying that "San Junipero" is their favourite episode.

That same year, the episode was parodied in The Amazing World of Gumball episode "The Stars" in which Richard Watterson gives Larry's hairdressing job a bad review, leading to Larry giving him his haircut for free. This influences Gumball and Darwin go reviewing the places Larry works to get various amenities for free, which leads to chaos.

=== Critical reception ===
Behind her pink and perky façade, Lacie becomes obsessed with social media status in "Nosedive", an episode that demonstrates the dangers of society's need for approval but does so with a perfect dose of humor.

— Critics' consensus on Rotten Tomatoes

"Nosedive" was well received by critics. Review aggregator website Rotten Tomatoes collected 22 reviews, identified 95% of them as positive, and calculated an average rating of 7.33/10. The episode garnered four-star ratings in The Independent and The Guardian, along with an A− rating in The A.V. Club. In The Mancunion, the episode received 3.5 stars; it was rated three stars by The Telegraph and the Irish Independent. Emefa Setranah of The Mancunion wrote that the episode lives up to the show's reputation, and The Guardian's Benjamin Lee said the episode feels fresh despite covering technology similarly to prior episodes.

Charles Bramesco wrote in Vulture that it expresses the show's "guiding theme" with "lucid clarity". TheWrap authors praised how the episode tackles society's social media obsession, and Mat Elfring of GameSpot said that its thought-provoking nature makes it a good choice for the season premiere. Matt Fowler wrote for IGN that the episode is "both fun and frustrating" which contrasts with the "grounded and grim" episodes to follow. Esquire's Corey Atad opined that it is "a tad too simplistic" though "totally engaging". Pat Stacey criticised in the Irish Independent that it "sets up the premise crisply, then spends far too much time labouring the point."

A major criticism was the episode's predictability and repetitiveness, while reception to the ending was mixed. Aubrey Page on Collider called the episode "woefully surface-level and a bit off-brand" because of its predictability, with Variety's Andrew Wallenstein agreeing and further saying that the episode lacks a disturbing tone, though this makes it more accessible. Zack Handlen of The A.V. Club believed that the first half of "Nosedive" is too predictable but the second half "[adds] depth and sincerity". Tasha Robinson wrote for The Verge that the episode "can be strident and obvious" but "understands human nature very well". Some reviewers believed the episode was too long and the ending was too positive. However, Digital Spy's Alex Mullane praised the ending, because though it is "bleak in some ways" it is also "a moment of sheer, fist-pumping joy"; Jacob Hall agreed in /Film, calling the ending "simultaneously cathartic and on-the-nose".

Critics had a mostly positive response to the script as a whole, with some noting comedic undertones. Robinson described the episode as an "exaggerated morality play about the dangers of conformity and the small pleasures of individuality". The script has been called "bitingly hilarious", "funny", "uplifting", "moving" and "supremely unsettling". Lee approved of the script avoiding exposition. On the other hand, The Telegraph's Mark Monahan criticised that the plot and characters do not live up to their potential. Page felt the episode "lacks the sadistic snap of Brooker's usual work".

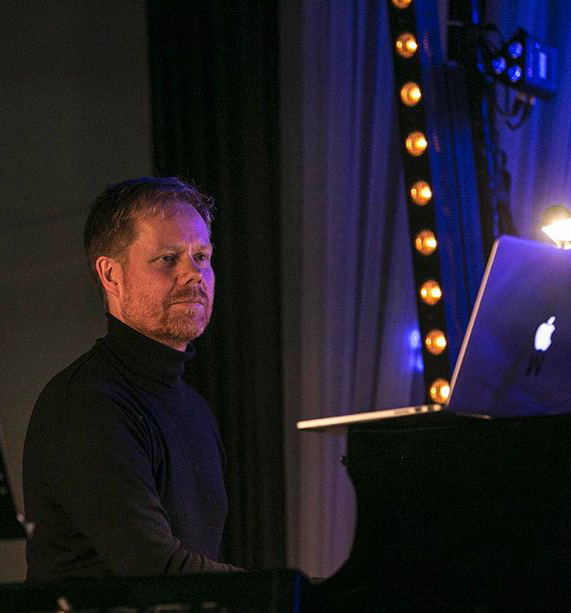
Max Richter's soundtrack for the episode was praised by reviewers.

The episode's visual style and Joe Wright's directing were highly commended; the setting for the episode garnered positive reception. Architectural Digest reviewed it as the best design of the third series. Hall complimented "stellar production values". Sophie Gilbert of The Atlantic praises the juxtaposition of calm visuals with narrative tension. Robinson noted that the aesthetics mark a difference between the characters with high and low ratings. Setranah noted that Netflix's large budget is apparent in the visuals of the episode, and The Independent writers suggested it is detailed enough to be revisited.

Many critics praised Howard's performance, with Atad calling it "delightfully unhinged". Additionally, Gilbert wrote that Howard "conveys Lacie's inner frustration while grinning cheerfully through it". Howard's acting ensures viewers are on Lacie's side, according to Mullane, who also compliments Eve's acting as "excellent".

Max Richter's musical composition for the episode was well-received. The Independent writers complimented Richter for "blending the diegetic sounds of the app with the non-diegetic score evoking our protagonist's struggle to determine reality and fiction", an element which Robinson also praised. Fowler called the score "very compelling" and Monahan described it as "elegantly elegiac".

=== Episode ranking ===
"Nosedive" appears on many critics' rankings of the 19 episodes in Black Mirror, from best to worst.

- 3rd – Charles Bramesco, Vulture
- 3rd – Eric Anthony Glover, Entertainment Tonight
- 5th – Matt Donnelly and Tim Molloy, TheWrap
- 5th – Travis Clark, Business Insider
- 6th – Morgan Jeffery, Digital Spy
- 8th – Aubrey Page, Collider
- 9th – James Hibberd, Entertainment Weekly
- 13th – Corey Atad, Esquire
- 13th – Steve Greene, Hanh Nguyen and Liz Shannon Miller, IndieWire

Instead of by quality, Proma Khosla of Mashable ranked each episode by tone, concluding that "Nosedive" is the 15th most pessimistic of the 19 episodes.

Other critics ranked the 13 episodes in Black Mirror's first three series.

- 6th – Adam David, CNN Philippines
- 7th – Mat Elfring, GameSpot
- 8th – Ed Power, The Telegraph
- 9th – Jacob Hall, /Film
- 9th (of the Top Ten) – Brendan Doyle, Comingsoon.net
- 10th – Andrew Wallenstein, Variety

Some critics ranked the six episodes from series three of Black Mirror in order of quality.

- 2nd – Jacob Stolworthy and Christopher Hooton, The Independent
- 3rd – Liam Hoofe, Flickering Myth

=== Awards ===
"Nosedive" was nominated for several awards in 2017; the third season of Black Mirror also received several other nominations and awards.

Award	Category	Recipients	Result	Ref
BAFTA Television Craft Awards	Best Photography and Lighting – Fiction	Seamus McGarvey	Nominated	
Screen Actors Guild Awards	Outstanding Performance by a Female Actor in a Television Movie or Miniseries	Bryce Dallas Howard	Nominated	
Art Directors Guild Awards	Excellence in Production Design for a Television Movie or Limited Series	Joel Collins, James Foster and Nicholas Palmer (Also nominated for "Playtest" and "San Junipero")	Nominated	
NAACP Image Awards	Outstanding Writing in a Motion Picture – Television	Rashida Jones and Michael Schur	Nominated	
Primetime Emmy Awards	Outstanding Cinematography for a Limited Series or Movie	Seamus McGarvey	Nominated	
Royal Television Society Craft & Design Awards	Production Design – Drama	Joel Collins, James Foster	Won	

== Board game ==
Based on the episode, the board game Nosedive was produced by Asmodee. Released on 25 November 2018, the game requires between three and six players and is designed to last for roughly 45 minutes. A mobile app, available for Android or iOS, is used to play the game; it initially assigns each player a Social Score. In the initial Lifestyle phase, players draw cards which have ratings between one and five stars, such as the one star card "A six-minute lunch break". They tactically assign them to stacks and then each player selects a stack.

In the Experience phase, players assign each other experiences such as "Receiving an anonymous hate cake" and each player then rates their received experiences from one to five stars. The app then adjusts each player's Social Score based on these ratings. At the end of the game, players earn points from the Lifestyle cards they own which have star ratings less than or equal to their Social Score.

Tasha Robinson of The Verge criticised the game's mechanics as feeling arbitrary, as users' Social Scores are mostly determined by random factors. However, Robinson praised the app's design, the game's pastel aesthetics and the humour of the Experience cards, which can lead to interesting discussion.

== See also ==
- Reputation system
- Review – an American mockumentary television series about a person who rates life experiences
- The Circle – a reality competition series where participants rate each other
