= Peeple (company) =

- Industry: Home security
- Founder: Chris Chuter
- Headquarters: Austin, Texas, U.S.A.
- Website: peeple.io

Peeple is a technology company based in Austin, Texas. It is best known for its internet based peephole that allows users to see people outside their house using a mobile app.

== History ==
Peeple was founded by Chris Chuter. In 2015, the company won $150,000 at a competition in the United Kingdom for its internet-enabled peephole.

The company has been confused with Peeple, a mobile application that allows users to rate other people based on their personalities, professionalism, and dating experience. In September 2015, company founder Chris Chuter told Wired that his company began receiving negative feedback from people who believed his company was behind the mobile application.
