= List of Killjoys episodes =

Killjoys is a Canadian space adventure drama television series that aired on Space channel in Canada. The show was officially ordered to series on October 7, 2013, with a ten-episode pick-up. In April 2014, it was announced that Syfy would co-produce the series, and the first season premiered June 19, 2015.

During the course of the series, 50 episodes of Killjoys aired over five seasons.

== Series overview ==
Season	Episodes	Originally released	
Season	Episodes	First released	Last released
1	10	June 19, 2015	August 21, 2015
2	10	July 1, 2016	September 2, 2016
3	10	June 30, 2017	September 1, 2017
4	10	July 20, 2018	September 21, 2018
5	10	July 19, 2019	September 20, 2019

== Episodes ==
=== Season 1 (2015) ===
No. overall	No. in season	Title	Directed by	Written by	Original release date	Prod. code
1	1	"Bangarang"	Chris Grismer	Michelle Lovretta	June 19, 2015	257149-1
Dutch and Johnny are Killjoys, bounty hunters in the Quad located in the J Star Cluster. After apprehending a smuggler, Johnny takes some alone time when he is alerted of a Level 5 kill warrant for one Kobee Andras. His attempts to hide his intentions from Dutch fail when she learns he has taken out the kill warrant in her name. Johnny finds and fights Andras, who turns out to be his brother, D'avin. When Dutch catches up, she quickly learns that Fancy Lee is following the same kill warrant and that the mark is Johnny's brother. Dutch hits D'avin with a nerve block and they take him to their ship. Dutch devises a plan to trade a microchip stolen from the Company in exchange for removing the kill warrant. They set about getting the microchip. In the process, D'avin kills the monk, a revolutionary. They make the trade and the warrant on D'avin is cancelled. After the mission, Dutch receives a red box containing a weapon: the same type of box she used to receive as a child during her training.
2	2	"The Sugar Point Run"	Chris Grismer	Jeremy Boxen	June 26, 2015	257149-2
The Killjoys take a warrant just to pay off their debt for the damage done on Qresh. The new warrant is a prisoner exchange. Dutch tries to turn it down but Hills threatens her and forces her to take it. They learn that a hostage situation has developed, involving the prisoner's sister and the Mayor's daughter. The trio go to Sugar Point, a run-down area where scavengers steal anything of value, where the ship is shot down. D'avin and Dutch make their way towards the hostage situation, while Johnny is left in the ship. The ship is surrounded by scavengers, but Johnny manages to get rid of them. The duo are captured by organ harvesters, but escape, and rescue the Mayor's daughter by directing the scavengers to the warlord's domain. Back on Westerly, the trio go to the Royale and discuss D'avin's options: Dutch recommends that he become a Killjoy, and he accepts. The box from the previous episode is an assignment from Khlyen to kill someone, and Dutch goes off on her own to find out why.
3	3	"The Harvest"	Michael Robison	Aaron Martin	July 3, 2015	257149-3
D'avin passes his interview to become a Killjoy, but still needs a psych eval. He starts as Level 4, outranking Johnny. Dutch interrogates the man Khlyen wants dead, but he has no idea why, so she releases him. Johnny's friend N'oa wants him to take a warrant on her missing husband so she will not go to prison. Pawter agrees to sign D'avin's psych eval in exchange for a ride on the ship. On Leith, Johnny goes undercover as a field worker and Dutch as a Hokk distributor. They hack a computer and find Vincent's ear tracker, but it does not lead them to Vincent. Following a different lead, Johnny finds Vincent, who is running a Jakk grow. The Hokk grower cuts his losses and calls the authorities to defoliate the grow. Johnny captures Vincent and they just barely make it off Lieth. On Westerly, Vincent is arrested for an expired Visa, because they took the long way back. Johnny expresses concern over D'avin joining them, but Dutch tells him not to worry as D'avin will likely leave when he finds the doctor he is looking for.
4	4	"Vessel"	Andy Mikita	Emily Andras	July 10, 2015	257149-4
D'avin chases and recovers his first Level 4 warrant in Old Town. The trio then head to Bellus, who has been calling Dutch all day. Delle Seyah Kendry, a member of one of the Nine Families, approaches Dutch with a mission: the Nine use a fertility cult to carry their heirs to term, and the unborn Lehani heir has gone missing. Delle Seyah wants to avoid a war over Lehani land should the heir not inherit. The Killjoys track the surrogate mother, Constance, to a hidden abbey in the Bad Lands. Despite coming under attack by one of the Nine's house guard in disguise, they extract her and deliver her to Qresh. Johnny lands the ship—defying Delle Seyah's order—just as Constance delivers the baby in the cargo hold. Delle Seyah is forced to acknowledge the new Qreshi citizen and is now the baby's legal guardian. Delle Seyah tells Dutch that by forcing her hand Dutch has made her some enemies. Dutch gives it 50/50 odds that Delle Seyah was behind the attack and used her to find the heir. Delle Seyah, intrigued by Dutch's concealed refinement, orders her house guard to investigate.
5	5	"A Glitch in the System"	Chris Grismer	Adam Barken	July 17, 2015	257149-5
Coming across a cargo ship in an asteroid belt, the Killjoys think they've hit the jackpot in unclaimed treasure. They split up to explore, but find they are not alone. Lucy detaches the ship and stops responding. Johnny discovers that the cargo ship is military black ops, and that Hogan, who claimed to be a ship picker, was an original crew member. Hogan captures D'avin and tortures him. Under the torture, D'avin reveals the secret to his nightmares. While attempting to rescue D'avin, Dutch gets caught and breathes in nanites. She taunts Hogan, saying she knows what Red 17 is, and then blasts him with a directional charge. Dutch spaces herself, trusting the nanites will keep her alive until Lucy can pull her in: the plan works. They blow up the cargo ship so the torture/heal cycle will be ended. D'avin goes to see Pawter, who tells him he has memory blockers in his brain. Pawter says D'avin seems different and they explore those differences via sex. Khlyen appears on the ship, and, after threatening to hurt Johnny, convinces Dutch to go with him for one last job.
6	6	"One Blood"	Michael Nankin	Annmarie Morais	July 24, 2015	257149-6
Khlyen tells Dutch to retrieve a package for him, and she does. The Killjoys are called in for a Black Warrant on a rogue killjoy, Big Joe, who has been stealing from Company ships. Khlyen gives Dutch a neural link; he wants Dutch to go alone and bring him the cargo. D'avin tells Pawter he wants to discontinue therapy, but she insists she wants to help by finding Dr. Jaeger. Pawter gets Hills drunk and steals his clearance to look for Jaeger. The boys start without Dutch, but Fancy joins them. On Leith, Dutch and Big Joe clash, but make up and Dutch tells him she just wants the cargo and is not pursuing the death warrant. Joe and Dutch are taken hostage. The boys track Dutch and rescue her. The item is a genetic bomb which can target DNA, so the group goes back to the Royale to try and trade the bomb for Joe's life. Hills confronts Turin telling him the bomb is a Black List weapon. The warrant is upgraded to a Level 5. Joe does not want to run, so he asks Dutch to shoot him: she won't, but Fancy does. Back on the ship, Dutch tells the boys about Khlyen.
7	7	"Kiss Kiss, Bye Bye"	Paolo Barzman	Michelle Lovretta	July 31, 2015	257149-7
Dutch asks Johnny to use the neural link to track Khlyen. Dutch and D'avin go out to shoot; she says Khlyen holds pieces of her past, D'avin says the same is true of Dr. Jaeger. On the ship, Johnny uses the link on himself. The attempt backfires and he calls for help. They get Pawter to remove the link, but it breaks. Pawter and D'avin fight but she tells him of a patient, Grayson, with the same issues as him. The team break Grayson out, and he takes them to Utopia to look for the doctor. Johnny meets with Carleen, who may be able to fix the link. Dutch and D'avin talk and kiss. Grayson finds the doctor but she is not the right person. Dutch is arrested. Delle Seyah offers to get Dutch released and find Jaeger. Jaeger tells D'avin that he had a psychotic break and killed his own squad. Dutch and D'avin have a deep conversation: Johnny walks in on them, and quietly leaves. Jaeger starts mind-controlling D'avin, who tries to kill Dutch. D'avin almost kills Johnny, but Lucy calls Pawter, who saves him. Dutch has Jaeger undergo a mind-wipe.
8	8	"Come the Rain"	Peter Stebbings	Jeremy Boxen	August 7, 2015	257149-8
In the aftermath of D'avin being mind-controlled, Johnny talks D'avin and Dutch into taking a warrant, in a scheme to get them talking. Westerly is put under lockdown when a wave of Black Rain hits. During the lockdown, Pree's bar is held hostage and Johnny tries to keep everyone alive. Pawter is in Jakk withdrawal, and Johnny goes to score drugs for her so she can operate on one of the thieves who attacked the Royale. She finishes the surgery. A Company man is caught calling for help and thrown out into the Black Rain. Johnny goes to rescue him and picks up a nail gun, which he later uses to kill the hostage-takers. On the ship, Dutch and D'avin work through a team-building exercise set up by Johnny. They conclude that Dutch does not trust D'avin, but are forced to abandon the exercise. D'avin tells Johnny that the team is broken and he is moving off the ship. He tries to apologize, but Johnny tells him to figure out how to fix things on his own.
9	9	"Enemy Khlyen"	Paolo Barzman	Emily Andras	August 14, 2015	257149-9
D'avin is working small warrants in Old Town and discovers Alvis smuggling weapons. Dutch visits D'avin to return some of his things. Carleen uses an experimental method so Dutch can astrally project to Khlyen's position. Dutch sees an advanced liquid plasma computer and realizes Khlyen is on level 71 of the RAC. Johnny and Dutch devise a plan to get to Khlyen and ask D'avin for help. The three go to the RAC under the pretence of dissolving the team. D'avin sets off an EMP bomb, which shuts down the RAC and gives Dutch the time to reach level 71. Johnny finds the computer, copies some files and takes some of the plasma, triggering a station-wide lockdown. Dutch pretends to poison herself to get Khlyen to answer her questions. D'avin is delayed by Turin, who says Dutch is marked for Red 17. The boys meet back up while heading for the ship. Dutch reaches them but stays on the RAC so the boys can escape. Dutch runs into Turin, who shoots her in the leg. Khlyen stabs Turin. He reveals he is level six, then sends Dutch back to Westerly.
10	10	"Escape Velocity"	Ken Girotti	Michelle Lovretta	August 21, 2015	257149-10
Alvis is arrested for the Leith massacre after being framed. Dutch visits him in Westhole and the boys see Bellus asking her about Level 6. Alvis asks Dutch to get the entry codes for the bunkers under Old Town. Carleen tries to decrypt Khlyen's files, but Khlyen kills her. The trio pose as monks to get the codes and ID tags. They split up: D'avin goes to talk to Hills while Dutch and Johnny go to Qresh to meet Delle Seyah. D'avin sees Khlyen in his room and, after calling Dutch, gives chase. On Qresh, Johnny talks to Pawter's mother, Seyah Simms. Dutch sees an assassin with the genetic bomb and tries to stop him. Dutch gets the bomb but Delle Seyah triggers it. When asked, Delle Seyah says she thought Dutch knew, since Khlyen wanted Dutch on Qresh. Dutch realizes the Company is going to bomb Old Town. Dutch and Johnny return to Old Town to warn people. In the tunnels, Alvis and Pawter take civilians to the bunkers. As the ship flies away from Old Town, Dutch realizes that Khlyen has D'avin, and asks Lucy to record a message.

=== Season 2 (2016) ===
No. overall	No. in season	Title	Directed by	Written by	Original release date	Prod. code
11	1	"Dutch and the Real Girl"	Stefan Pleszczynski	Michelle Lovretta	July 1, 2016	269324-2
Dutch, Johnny, and D'avin are on Arkyn and heading toward Red 17. D'avin starts having flashbacks to his time in Red 17. Dutch agrees it might be a trap but goes anyway. D'avin decides to kiss Dutch before she goes in; D'avin is dreaming and is being pumped full of green plasma. Dutch and Johnny are on Lucy outside of Arkyn, figuring out how to land. Bellus tells them where there might be a shield to get them on Arkyn. The tech they are looking for is at Eulogy, a criminal barter town. Dutch finds the tech but it is inside a woman, Clara, a hack mod. Lucy picks them up outside and they head to Arkyn. Clara is injured every time she goes through the Arkyn shield but she agrees to do it. D'avin rejects the green plasma, and Khlyen shoots his way through to save D'avin and send him back to Dutch. Khlyen is taken down by the Black Root who say that they are sending him home. D'avin proves he is not Level 6 and they let Clara go. D'avin tells Dutch and Johnny about a dream, that Dutch was on Arkyn and was killing Scarbacks.
12	2	"Wild, Wild Westerley"	Martin Wood	Sean Reycraft	July 8, 2016	269324-3
The trio goes back to the RAC to put D'avin back on the team and find Turin when they arrive. To get back into Old Town the team takes a warrant. The Wall around Old Town keeps the team out, and flags Pree as not being allowed in. The wall zaps all four and they wake up in a bio-dome set up by Liam Jelco. Jelco allows the team to go into Old Town. Pree takes back the Royale and the team heads to Westhole. They find that the prisoners are mummies and the guard tells them that a gas caused it. The team goes to see Alvis who takes them to Tighmon, the only remaining prisoner. When Dutch and Alvis go to meet with Tighmon, the Company kills him. Pawter and Hills get into the bio-dome, and Jelco kills Hills. Under Spring Hill, Alvis reverses the air flow and gasses himself. D'avin and Dutch save Alvis and Dutch asks Alvis to leave Old Town with them. As they fly away, Lucy becomes unresponsive and she flies back to Westerly Bad Lands where they find Turin. Turin explains that he wants to team up with Dutch's team.
13	3	"Shaft"	Martin Wood	Jon Cooksey	July 15, 2016	269324-1
Dutch and Khlyen are in a cave where Khlyen tells her she is already a level 6. Flashing back, Turin tells them Level 6 is still in the RAC and he wants them to investigate the disappearance of another team. Pawter is still Jelco's hostage; he put an exploding ankle bracelet on her ankle. During surgery on Jelco Pawter gets Jelco's blood for DNA computer authentication, dispatches his guard, and finds plans to put walls around all the towns in Westerly. They find one member of the missing team, Tania, who is hiding out in a mine. The team takes Alvis with them. Tania falls into a pit and they discover man-eating centipedes have killed everyone on the other team. Dutch sees Khlyen; the centipedes cause hallucinations, they are repelled by D'avin, and full of green plasma. On Lucy, Alvis tells Dutch he found a dead monk in the mine with a secret scroll. Alvis heads to Leith to try and decode the scroll. Pawter escapes Jelco by putting the bracelet around his heart but she is struck down as she leaves the compound. Dutch tells Turin he works for her now.
14	4	"Schooled"	Ruba Nadda	Story by : Jennifer Kennedy & Julian Doucet; Teleplay by : Julian Doucet	July 22, 2016	269324-4
Dutch and D'avin are wrestling when Turin calls with a warrant for the location of the final Red 17 transmission, Prodigy school. Pawter is in the Salt Plains and wins her freedom right when Johnny shows up, they take off and she tells Johnny about what she found, he wants to help. Pawter joins them on Lucy. The team escort some kids to the school and when they get there the school is empty. A video of Delle Seyah greets them and they find empty cryo-pods in the classroom that end up containing the degraded remains of all but one of the children and the teacher. Olan survived and is trying to kidnap his brother, one of the kids the team escorted to the school. Dell Seyah and Dutch work together to save them and become allies by force. The team takes Olan to Alvis at the monastery to try and unlock the transmission that is locked in his brain. At the RAC Fancy kills the Black Root officers transporting Khlyen and they head to D'avin's home planet to figure out why he is immune to the green plasma.
15	5	"Meet the Parents"	Jeff Renfroe	Adam Barken	July 29, 2016	269324-5
D'avin and Dutch are working on Westerly and Johnny is escorting Pawter to Qresh to see her family. After catching their warrant D'avin heads to the Royale to see Sabine but passes out. Khlyen connects to D'avin's mind to find D'avin's father. Khlyen and Fancy interrogate D'avin's father and determine D'avin's immunity to the plasma is not from his father. Dutch is worried about D'avin fainting and takes his gun, then pulls it on him when D'avin hums a song only Khlyen should know. The next time Khlyen tries to link with D'avin he fights back and their minds switch. Pawter tries to convince her mother to lift the order of exile but the estate is attacked. In the fight to save them Pawter's parents die. Khlyen, in D'avin's body, tells Dutch that he needs to know why D'avin is immune and that it was not her on Arkyn before they switch back. D'avin attacks Fancy and helps his father escape. Pawter takes her place as the head of the Simms family. Johnny makes a secret deal to help Pawter. Dutch hugs Johnny, and he lies to her, telling her nothing has changed.
16	6	"I Love Lucy"	Grant Harvey	Jon Cooksey	August 5, 2016	269324-6
The team chases a warrant and succeeds. On Lucy Dutch says they need more info on the plasma and D'avin shows her he can attract and repel the plasma. Pree gives them a lead on someone who might have original recipe. The team meets up with Romwell, an eccentric trader, who agrees to trade them half of Mossie but tricks them by taking the plasma out of Mossie and giving it to them. Dutch and Romwell strike a deal for the team's freedom and after a confrontation Dutch kills him. Johnny and D'avin are taken by Romwell's androids. They escape by having Lucy take over one of them. Dutch tries to find the key for the plasma but Romwell proves immortal and tries to stop her. Romwell then tries to convince Dutch to stay with him but in the end they all leave together because the androids are stuck in Kill mode. Romwell thanks Dutch for saving him with a vial of plasma. Pawter shows up on Lucy to meet with Johnny while D'avin and Sabine meet up. Sabine starts convulsing and green plasma comes out of her while they are having sex.
17	7	"Heart-Shaped Box"	April Mullen	Michelle Lovretta	August 12, 2016	269324-7
Johnny tries to get information on The Wall from a Company employee, she runs. D'avin and Johnny take Sabine to Dutch, Sabine is Level 6. Johnny and Pawter have a secret meeting, Pawter takes out a warrant on the company employee. Johnny takes the warrant solo. The team goes to see Turin, his assistant is also Level 6 and Sabine kills him before he can kill her. Turin leaves Sabine with the team and Sabine makes a deal with Dutch to help her find all the other Level 6's. Sabine and D'avin use the plasma to do this but D'avin also sees a safe house on Leith in the visions. Sabine claims she is working for Khlyen but she is with the Black Root looking for Khlyen. D'avin lets Sabine go but puts a tracker on her. They track her to Leith where Dutch finds the safe house and a red box, and shoots Sabine in the head. Johnny finds the Company employee, follows a lead from her to Jelco's office but is taken prisoner. Dutch thinks Sabine led her to the safe house to get a message, and that the person Khlyen wants her to kill is her doppelganger.
18	8	"Full Metal Monk"	Paolo Barzman	Sean Reycraft	August 19, 2016	269324-8
Dutch confronts Johnny for betraying her, she leaves but calls Pawter to help. D'avin and Turin hunt 6's. D'avin makes a 6's eyes explode. Pawter frees Johnny, they investigate how the Company will kill the weak; they are poisoning the new rations. Jelco and Delle Seyah turn The Wall on early to dispose of Pawter and Johnny. At the Royale the couple are loopy when Arune, one of the 9, arrives. Arune is suspicious and Jelco kills him, framing Pawter and Johnny. Jelco explains The Wall mind-controls people making them complacent. Dutch and D'avin go to see Olin. After hearing the name Aneela he draws them a map. They take Alvis and follow the map to Arkyn where they find a safe house leading them to the abandoned site of the first Red 17. There is a very old Monk behind a wall. Once free D'avin mind controls him using his new powers, and after he tells them that Aneela is Khlyen's daughter he asks them to kill him, Dutch does. Dutch worries she is Aneela, D'avin talks her down. D'avin and Dutch discover what The Wall does. Jelco announces a new batch of rations are coming.
19	9	"Johnny Be Good"	Stefan Pleszczynski	Adam Barken	August 26, 2016	269324-9
The Wall is down, piles of dead in Old Town, Dutch is a hostage in the Royale. D’avin is leading Jelco through the Bad Lands. Dutch’s interrogator gives her a lie detector; she does know where Jelco is. Flash back Dutch and D’avin save Johnny and Pawter. They raid Spring Hill but it is empty. While trying to find Jelco and take down The Wall Johnny battles the system computer, Pawter confronts Delle Seyah, Dutch and D’avin go after Jelco. Delle Seyah reveals her plan to poison and wall the whole moon. Dutch finds a room full of plasma stations. Pawter turns The Wall to Rage and hundreds die overloading The Wall bringing it down. Jelco knows where more plasma is and says this is just the beginning. While trying to leave with Jelco Dutch sacrifices herself, D’avin takes Jelco. D’avin negotiates, with Jelco’s help, to destroys Spring Hill. Delle Seyah arrives and negotiates with Pawter for Westerly independence. Once the decree is signed she kills Pawter and the Level 6 monks try to kill the team. Back on Lucy the team find Fancy has let Jelco go and wants them to go talk to Khlyen.
20	10	"How to Kill Friends and Influence People"	Peter Stebbings	Michelle Lovretta and Jeremy Boxen	September 2, 2016	269324-10
Khlyen is telling young Dutch a story. In a flashback, we see Khlyen as a scientist growing food thinking the plasma is a super-fertilizer. He had inadvertently awoken an ancient darkness that inhabits Aneela. Johnny wakes up and wants to return for Pawter, they tell him she is dead. Khlyen arrives and tells the team that the plasma is sentient when bonded with a human, they are called Hullen. The Hullen, led by Aneela, are coming to fulfill an arrangement made with the original Nine to take over the Quad. Khlyen has developed a toxin to kill the source of the plasma that will in turn kill all plasma that came from that source. Dutch consults with Alvis and the team follow the leads to the tree. While at the Archive Khlyen and Dutch fight their way to the vault with the tree. Khlyen sacrifices himself to kill the tree. Meanwhile Johnny and Lucy battle Black Root ships. Fancy is back to being human. Johnny shoots Delle Seyah and leaves her for dead. Johnny says goodbye to Lucy and prepares to run away. Lucy called Clara to come help Johnny and the two leave together.

=== Season 3 (2017) ===
No. overall	No. in season	Title	Directed by	Written by	Original release date	Prod. code
21	1	"Boondoggie"	Stefan Pleszczynski	Michelle Lovretta	June 30, 2017	269324-11
Dutch, Pree, D'avin, Alvis and Fancy Lee storm a Hullen base only to find a single Hullen home. He delivers a message, Hullen know they killed the Arkyn pool and there are more Hullen in the Quad who were non-Arkyn derived. D'avin and Dutch head to the RAC where Banyan Gray, from intergalactic oversight, calls out Dutch about Johnny being one of the 437 agents who are MIA. Johnny is looking for Clara and is surprised to instead find Ollie who is wearing Alice, Clara's spec arm. Dutch and crew hatch a plan to find more Hullen, kill one, and harvest the black goo from its body to use to kill more Hullen. To do this they use information Johnny has been sending about chemical beacons and two black-market dealers to lure the Hullen out. Johnny and Ollie go to a hackmod bar looking for Clara who had been recruiting hackmods to take on the Factory. Johnny gets a mod and they discover hackmods are going missing. Investigating this leads them into a trap that almost kills Ollie. Dutch's plan works, the team escapes capture, kill some Hullen, and deliver their own message, Dutch is going to start a war.
22	2	"A Skinner, Darkly"	Andy Mikita	Michelle Lovretta	July 7, 2017	269324-12
Turin insists Dutch and D’avin take a few of the RAC’s best brains for a test drive mission, in search for a temporary replacement for Johnny. The rookies soon find themselves in over their heads, trapped in an abandoned black site bent on killing them all. Across the J, Johnny finds himself in hot water of his own as his search for Clara leads him to a mysterious skin rejuvenation center, hiding an even bigger mystery under its surface.
23	3	"The Hullen Have Eyes"	Ruba Nadda	Adam Barken	July 14, 2017	269324-13
Johnny has been reinstated as a RAC agent and meets Zeph, who gives him a run for his money. Zeph finds out how to get into the Black Root ship and the crew take it to its last coordinates. Meanwhile, Aneela welcomes Delle Seyah Kendry to her ship. Kendry gives Aneela news of Khlyen's death. Back on the Black Root ship, the team is taken to a planet with a quaint village. Dutch and D'avin explore the area and find out the village was a training ground for Hullen. A solar flare cuts the reconnaissance short and the two shield their eyes, but while doing so are disarmed by a group of shrouded inhabitants. The two run to the nearest house for cover where a young girl named Quin leads them down to a cellar. They are led to the inhabitants, whom have their eyes sewn shut, except for The Last Seer. After a brief altercation, Quin reminds D'avin that he was there three days earlier looking for something called the remnant.
24	4	"The Lion, the Witch & the Warlord"	Paolo Barzman	Julian Doucet	July 21, 2017	269324-14
Johnny is finally promoted to level 5 but the celebrations are short-lived as a black warrant is issued for him after proof of his murder of Delle Seyah Kendry comes to light. He, Dutch and Pree escape on Lucy where Pree directs them towards Ohron, home of the Ferran and a surprising chapter of Pree's enigmatic past that may put all three in danger.
25	5	"Attack the Rack"	Jeff Renfroe	Shernold Edwards	July 28, 2017	269324-15
The crew kidnap several RAC officers from other branches and force them to watch as they launch a daring coup attempt against the Hullen in order to prove the threat present to the whole J. Things head South thanks to a mole in the ranks, general distrust in the ranks threatens to undo everything before a familiar weapon turns the tide, or so they think.
26	6	"Necropolis Now"	Samir Rehem	Andrew De Angelis	August 4, 2017	269324-16
Dutch, Johnny, and D'Avin attend a funeral on the Necropolis (a space station situated next to a sun, used by the Monks to burn the bodies of the dead) along with members of The Nine Families, to honor the deaths of RAC agents. Alvis performs the ceremony, feeding a holy seed to each attendee. Shortly after, the elevator that brought them all to the Necropolis leaves with everyone aboard except Johnny and Louella Simms. The elevator breaks down and members of The Nine begin mysteriously dying, and Dutch and D'Avin attempt to find the murderer. Meanwhile, Johnny and Louella reminisce over Pawter Simms as Johnny attempts to fix the elevator.
27	7	"The Wolf You Feed"	Stefan Pleszczynski	Nikolijne Troubetzkoy	August 11, 2017	269324-17
Dutch, Zeph, and Johnny probe through Aneela's missing memories to find a weakness to win the war against the Hullen. Meanwhile, D'Avin tries to persuade Fancy and the rest of the cleansed (ex-Hullen) to join the war against the Hullen, in order to acquire pilots that know how to fly Hullen ships.
28	8	"Heist, Heist Baby"	April Mullen	Julie Puckrin	August 18, 2017	269324-18
Johnny finds a way to disrupt Hullen ship hardware with a soundwave. In order to project the soundwave through the Quad, Team Awesome Force attempt to steal a sonic mining tool. The plan goes awry when Jelco makes a concurrent attempt to steal jewels from the miners. Meanwhile, Aneela tortures Gander to find where he is hiding Delle Seyah Kendry, and comes into conflict with the plans of The Lady in The Green.
29	9	"Reckoning Ball"	Peter Stebbings	Adam Barken	August 25, 2017	269324-19
It is Reckoning Day (the day before war). Delle Seyah Kendry appears in the RAC and requests to negotiate with Johnny Jacobi on behalf of Aneela. Johnny and Zeph also scan and test Kendry's baby, learning that D'Avin is the father and Aneela is the mother. Fancy attempts to reckon with Turin by giving him a second chance. Pree reckons with Gared over their relationship. Meanwhile, Dutch and D'Avin plant a false memory in a captured Hullen, in an attempt to lead Aneela into a trap. Aneela reckons with the monks.
30	10	"Wargasm"	Stefan Pleszczynski	Michelle Lovretta	September 1, 2017	269324-20
War begins. Aneela impersonates Dutch to sneak onto Lucy and steal a dreadnought intended for Aneela. Aneela injures Johnny while aboard. The sonic device is effective, but soon located by the Hullen. Delle Seyah Kendry kidnaps Dutch. Johnny and D'Avin sneak aboard Aneela's ship to rescue Dutch, but they are also captured by Kendry. Dutch and Aneela finally face-off, with both ultimately ending up in The Green. Meanwhile, Johnny convinces Kendry that Dutch's death would mean Aneela's death too; and Kendry calls off her forces. The Lady's forces come after Kendry, D'Avin, and Johnny.

=== Season 4 (2018) ===
No. overall	No. in season	Title	Directed by	Written by	Original release date	Prod. code
31	1	"The Warrior Princess Bride"	Stefan Pleszczynski	Michelle Lovretta	July 20, 2018	269324-21
In the Green, Khlyen carries a wounded Dutch to a shelter and tells a story to heal her while Aneela stands guard. The story details how Dutch and Johnny transported goods to the Quad but were arrested for smuggling and their goods are impounded. They discover they were being used as mules to allow an assassin to steal a smuggled vial of poison which has been previously impounded. Dutch strikes a deal with a RAC agent to free Johnny if they find the poison and the assassin who wants to use it. They track the group of people who stole the poison from the impound and ascertain where the assassin will strike: a 10-year retreat on Qresh where upper class couples get to try romancing different partners as Qresh marriage contracts expire every 10 years. Dutch and Johnny get into the retreat and save the target, but Johnny ends up poisoned. Dutch captures the assassin and convinces her to provide them the antidote, saving Johnny. After, they are offered jobs as RAC agents. In the Green, Dutch faces "The Lady" and is knocked off her feet by an unknown force.
32	2	"Johnny Dangerously"	Samir Rehem	Michelle Lovretta	July 27, 2018	269324-22
Johnny, D'Avin, and Delle Sayeh Kendry crash land the elevator on a planet where people's organs are harvested and regrown. Johnny gets hurt in an altercation and nearly dies. Kendry has a small amount of green and (with permission) turns Johnny into a Hullen. Johnny begins acting cruelly, emotionally detached, and erratic. Johnny rigs a contraption with a distress signal which Kendry installs, quickly learning that it was a trap set by Johnny to lead the organ harvesters away from him and D'Avin. Meanwhile, Zeph and Pip escape the RAC headquarters (which is overrun with frozen Hullen 'dolls') and meet-up with Pree, Turin, Gared and Fancy on the Armada (which also has loads of 'dolls'. To find Johnny and D'Avin, Zeph rigs up the cube with Root Ship jump technology. Zeph, Pip, and an ex-monk use the cube to jump onto the Necropolis, where they find the information and Pip is attacked by a 'doll' who spits out one of the spiders from the Green. Upon return to the Armada, Zeph deduces that Lucy is tracking the elevator; now, they just need to find Lucy.
33	3	"Bro-d Trip"	Samir Rehem	Julian Doucet	August 3, 2018	269324-23
Zeph, Pip, and Pree find and board Lucy, who has rebooted herself to a basic personality model. Attempts to restart Lucy initiates a lockdown and purge program. With only 20 minutes to live, Pip, Pree, and Zeph figure out Johnny's code to reboot Lucy properly. They fly Lucy strait to the crash-landed elevator. Meanwhile, Delle Sayeh Kendry has been captured by the organ harvester. Kendry tries to make a deal with the leader, but when he refuses and tries to harvest her baby, Kendry reveals his illegal baby harvesting to his company and gets him arrested. Meanwhile, Johnny takes D'Avin on a road trip to find a Green pool, using D'Avin's allergy to the green to find the pool. Johnny is becoming more erratic and talking to imaginary images of Dutch, who is trying to convince him to hold onto his humanity. Ultimately, Johnny tries to kill D'Avin, but Dutch appears from the Green and shoots Johnny, and then collapses as the Green crystalizes around her. Zeph, Pip, Pree, D'Avin, Johnny, and Dutch all board Lucy.
34	4	"What to Expect When You're Expecting... An Alien Parasite"	Stefan Pleszczynski	Nikolijne Troubetzkoy	August 10, 2018	269324-24
Aboard Lucy, Johnny is tied up and banging his head. Dutch is initially unconscious, but wakes-up and tries to figure out with Hullen Johnny why Khlyen told her the story of The Warrior and The Thief. Eventually, Zeph severs the Hullen from Johnny, and turns him back to human. Zeph is also preoccupied with Delle Sayeh Kendry, who has gone into labour; but the baby is growing/aging too quickly for the birth canal, and Kendry's Hullen healing powers are working too fast to cut the baby out. After cleansing Johnny, Zeph offers to sever the Hullen from Kendry as well. Kendry accepts in order to remove the baby. After, Dutch shares with everyone a vision shared with her by The Lady: Johnny killing every one of them. Dutch also shares that Aneela got her out, and she needs to return to rescue her. On the Armada, the dolls are starting to wake-up.
35	5	"Greening Pains"	Stefan Pleszczynski	Adam Barken	August 17, 2018	269324-25
Delle Sayeh Kendry's baby continues to grow quickly, turning into a five year old, then a teenager. Pip tries to arrange a meeting with a bio expert on Utopia, but is declined. So, Team Awesome Force infiltrate the bio expert's place to kidnap him. However, he traps Johnny and Dutch in a room with a nerve agent and a super computer. Turns out the super computer is the bio expert, and Johnny tricks him into ejecting himself onto a storage device. Meanwhile, D'Avin has been injecting himself with stimulants that make him super strong to fight the bio expert's guards. Back on Lucy, Johnny, Lucy, Zeph, and the bio-expert devise a bio-solution to slow down the aging process of Kendry's baby (now, teenager). Meanwhile, Pip takes the teenager off Lucy and buys transport away from Utopia. Team Awesome Force stop him just in time; and Pip doesn't seem to remember anything about what is happening. While discussing Khlyen's story about The Warrior and The Thief, Johnny and Dutch realize that Khlyen implanted a false memory of the assassin's face in Dutch's memory.
36	6	"Baby, Face Killer"	Stefan Pleszczynski	Julie Puckrin	August 24, 2018	269324-26
Kendry gives her baby a name (Ozzman Kin Rit) and a device to be used in emergencies, then leaves Lucy. Pree also leaves Lucy to rejoin his husband. Zeph finds a spider in Pip's brain, explaining his behaviour and missing memories; to keep Ozzman safe, she takes Pip onto the Black Root ship and flies away from Lucy, then experiments on his brain and the spider, ultimately finding they are inextricably linked and the death of one would mean the death of the other (and, unfortunately, the spiders don't live long). Dutch and Johnny explore Dutch's memory of the story, trying to find clues. A search for the face of the assassin from the story catches the attention of a real assassin who comes after Dutch and her memories. Dutch also begins training Ozzman as an assassin, so that he is ready for The Lady. Dutch is nearly shot by the assassin, but Ozzman foresees it and tells her to duck, and the two of them escape. Then, Dutch offers a 'White Blade' (a meeting between two assassins) to learn what connection he has to the assassin in Khlyen's story. After a few minutes of questions, the assassin attacks, Dutch is nearly overpowered, but Ozzman tranquilizes the assassin. Dutch begins torturing the assassin for information, but Ozzman walks in, and Dutch tries to teach Ozzman to torture, but D'Avin walks in and stops that training. During an argument about whether Dutch's decision was appropriate, D'Avin tells Dutch that Khlyen's assassin training was abusive. D'Aving tells Ozzman that he is not responsible for the decisions of the adults around him and allows him to choose his own name. Ozzman asks to be called Jaq (short for Jaqobis). D'Avin decides to take Jaq away from Lucy.
37	7	"O Mother, Where Art Thou?"	Michael Marshall	Andrew De Angelis	August 31, 2018	269324-27
Pree rescues Gared from the Hullen occupied RAC, learning that the Hullen are draining themselves to create a Green pool for The Lady. Johnny and Dutch follow the pulsar to a hidden planet, where Dutch meets Aneela's mother (Yelena) who holds a substance that can kill Aneela's Green. 250 years earlier, Khlyen brought Yelena to that planet, in order to destroy the Green, but Yelena made him stop, and to promise to find a way to save Aneela without killing her. Yelena agreed to remain on the planet and be put in stasis, so that she could guard the substance and use it if there came a time that there was no other option.
38	8	"It Takes a Pillage"	Stephanie Morgenstern	Derek Robertson	September 7, 2018	269324-28
Dutch and Johnny receive word that D'Avin and Jaq are on Tellan (Johnny and D'Avin's home planet). Johnny catches-up with his father (Marris), D'Avin and Jaq in the family bunker. The four men wait out a silica storm together, as Hullen attack. Marris is captured. An old friend of Johnny's, now a sheriff, appears and takes care of Jaq while Johnny and D'Avin mount a rescue of their father. The old friend sells them out and hands Jaq to the Hullen. The Hullen restrain the Jaqcobis. Jaq escapes by attacking a Hullen with training received from Dutch along with his own powers of precognition. Jaq meets up again with the Jacqobis and the four escape. Meanwhile, Dutch flies Lucy close to a sun to help Zeph analyze the substance collected from Yelena.
39	9	"The Kids Are Alright"	Stefan Pleszczynski	Julian Doucet	September 14, 2018	269324-29
Dutch, D'Avin, Fancy, Pree, Gared and Pip infiltrate the Hullen-controlled RAC ship and rescue the children stolen by the Hullen. Johnny keeps a bio-shield surrounding the RAC ship shutdown, so that the group can get in and out; eventually Johnny loses control, forcing a full reset to the RAC ship (giving the Hullen access to systems they were formerly locked out of, such as weapons). On the RAC-controlled Armada ship, Turin realizes that they are sitting ducks (because with the Green frozen, they have no control over engines, weapons, or shields on the Armada) and suggests entering self-destruct codes on the RAC ship. Pip volunteers to manually enter the codes, knowing it means he is sacrificing himself. Zeph and Pip say goodbye over coms. Meanwhile, using research done by Zeph, Dutch realizes the scars appearing on her body are instructions from Aneela to allow Dutch to re-enter the Green. Dutch follows the instructions, swallowing some Green goo and switching bodies with Aneela.
40	10	"Sporemageddon"	Stefan Pleszczynski	Adam Barken	September 21, 2018	269324-30
Aneela brings D'Avin and Johnny into the Green, returning them to their worst memories (Johnny: the moment Pawter Simms was killed by Delle Sayeh Kendry; D'Avin: the moment he attacked Dutch after their first time together), while Aneela listens to the plans of The Lady. Dutch, D'Avin, and Johnny pull each other out of their memories and go in search of Aneela. They meet-up with Aneela and The Lady in a memory of the Green pool Dutch saw on the hidden planet (guarded by Aneela's mother, Yelena). Aneela pretends to agree to The Lady's plan and the two leave. Dutch realizes that she needs to dose the Green pool within the memory, so she purposely remembers the moment that Yelena gave her the spore; then Dutch dumps it into the pool. Dutch, D'Avin, and Johnny escape the green and it turns black, but Dutch sees someone else trying to get out, and thinking it is Aneela, she pulls the person out. Meanwhile, Pree and several other people on Westerly have gotten sick with a flu-like virus. Zeph realizes that the children returned from the Hullen are responsible for spreading the (Hullen-created) virus. Zeph finds a cure, but while the symptoms disappear, people's memories, of who they are and who the people they love are, disappear as well (including Pree and Zeph's memories). Suddenly, Dutch and Johnny wake in each others' arms, convinced they are married, and that Dutch works in the bar and Johnny works in the factory (along with Gared). D'Avin is still a killjoy, but has no memory of Johnny or Dutch. Turin is a beggar in the street. A child does a voice-over, stating that she is in control of everything.

=== Season 5 (2019) ===
No. overall	No. in season	Title	Directed by	Written by	Original release date	Prod. code
41	1	"Run, Yala, Run"	Peter Stebbings	Michelle Lovretta	July 19, 2019	257149-31
In the bizarro version of Old Town, Dutch and Johnny continue to believe they are married and run a bar (and that Jaq is their son who was taken by the Qreshi for a better education). D'Avin believes he is a killjoy, searching for Jaq to fulfill a warrant. Pree believes that he is the company man on Westerly. Gared believes he is a factory worker escaping a prior life of crime by settling down with a woman. Zeph is a greasy haired nut, noticing and tracking anomalies and contradictions on Westerly, such as the twice-a-day rain on the arid moon. The Lady is using the rain and de-contamination showers to brainwash Old Towners; whenever people begin to remember memories that are not compatible with their experiences, their monitoring bracelet sends them to a decontamination shower. The Lady is also using the factory to produce smoke box creatures. In the meantime, Dutch, D'Avin, and Johnny raid Red 9 Station on Arkyn in an attempt to find Delle Seyah Kendry and Jaq. Kendry collects Dutch's fingerprints and DNA, before she and Jaq take off in a ship. Back in Old Town, Dutch reconnects with Lucy and learns that the brainwashing has lasted 43 days. Dutch dismantles the de-contamination showers and presents D'Avin, Johnny, and Pree with items to restore their memories; their monitoring bracelets go off and they run into the brainwashing rain, subsequently turning on Dutch. Zeph helps Dutch escape, but Zeph gets shot. Dutch brings Zeph to her makeshift lab to heal her. The Lady interrogates a now-living Khlyen about Dutch and he tells The Lady to not underestimate his 'girls'.
42	2	"Blame it on the Rain"	Peter Stebbings	Nikolijne Troubetzkoy	July 26, 2019	257149-32
Dutch saves Zeph by operating on her. Then, Dutch and Zeph figure out that The Lady is terraforming Westerly for those smoke box creatures and air will run out in 27 days. Zeph creates an inhibitor agent to counteract the brainwashing and uses it on herself first. Once her memories return, she forgives Dutch for Pip's death and blames The Lady instead. Johnny and D'Avin team up to find Dutch first. Dutch catches D'Avin and convinces him that something is wrong. Johnny sneaks into Zeph's lab and steals a tablet, noting her research and realizing that something is wrong. Johnny and D'Avin sneak into the smoke box creatures factory. Dutch meets them there and injects them with the inhibitor agent, returning their memories. Dutch torches the smoke box creatures. D'Avin and Johnny set explosives around the factory and rescue Pree. However, torching the creatures created a power surge from The Lady, knocking out coms and the team's connection to Zeph, meaning they are trapped in the factory. Meanwhile, Zeph tries to fix the problem by going above ground to fix the weather station, but it starts to rain, brainwashing her; however she carves a symbol into her arm before losing her memories. Meanwhile, aboard The Lady's ship, she switches bodies and convinces Khlyen to negotiate with Dutch on The Lady's behalf. The Lady hopes to find Jaq.
43	3	"Three Killjoys and a Lady"	Paolo Barzman	Vivian Lin & Derek Robertson	August 2, 2019	257149-33
The Lady tortures D'Avin, Dutch, and Johnny, until Khlyen helps them to escape. On Lucy, D'Avin wants to find Jaq, while Dutch wants to return to Westerly and destroy more factories. Systems start going wrong (thruster failures, burning experiments, overheating power source). Dutch finds a mark on D'Avin that she earlier saw on The Lady and believes he has been taken over. Johnny finds the same mark on himself and Dutch. Suspicions run rampant among the team, particularly when Lucy suggests brain scans and finds that Dutch's EEG signals are different. Dutch realizes that there is a forth member of their team that they are overlooking: Lucy. The whole team get naked (in order to initiate Lucy's de-monitoring privacy controls) and figure out how to check Lucy's systems. Ultimately, Johnny has to do a hard re-boot on Lucy, but not before she uses a projector cube to tell him face-to-face that the smoky box creature was a clone and that a virus was planted in her own system that Johnny would not be able to overcome. Johnny, Dutch, and D'Avin toast Lucy, while figuring out that The Lady is making clones from her own original body and their job needs to be hunting down that body and destroying it. The Lady recaptures the team and sends them to a prison ship. The Lady also agrees to an alliance with Khlyen.
44	4	"Ship Outta Luck"	Paolo Barzman	Julie Puckrin	August 9, 2019	257149-34
On Westerly, Zeph injects the inhibitor into Turin and Pree. Together, they find a fleet of Black Root ships that are being used to drop the brain washing rain each day. Zeph collects samples of the brain washing chemical, then she and Turin blow-up the fleet. The Lady, who is having difficulty dealing with human emotions, worries that there is an uprising in Old Town and tells Khlyen to put a stop to it. Meanwhile, Team Awesome Force are imprisoned on a high security prison ship. Johnny, initially thinks it is an underground prison and helps Dutch escape from solitary and D'Avin escape from the psych ward. When they realize they are on a ship, they make a deal with the Warden to find the would-be assassin of the most powerful criminal in Ward X. D'Avin realizes the would-be assassin is the prisoner Calvert that he befriended in the psych ward. After saving the life of the most powerful prisoner (Sparlo), the team insists on being given his protection and that he owes them one. They also tell the Warden that they would like to stay in Ward X.
45	5	"A Bout, A Girl"	James Genn	Andrew De Angelis	August 16, 2019	257149-35
A Qresh family sponsored fight tournament takes over the prison. Dutch enters as a contestant and knocks out all of the other prisoner contestants, leaving her to fight the Qresh champion in her final fight. In her first fight, she bit a control chip out of her opponent, and passed it on to Johnny to do some tech stuff on the chips in all the prisoners. D'Avin is requisitioned by the Qresh sister to kill her brother. The chip plan goes awry and the team needs help from the most powerful criminal in return for turning off his and his friends' chips. Sparlo, Coren and their friends shoot the champion (before Dutch has knocked him out) and guards, then turn on Dutch and D'Avin, while Johnny makes a getaway from the Warden's office.
46	6	"Three Mutineers"	James Genn	Adam Barken	August 23, 2019	257149-36
In Old Town, at Khlyen's request, Gared switches Pree's PDF with a fake that allows Khlyen to eavesdrop. Zeph manages to mimic the brainwashing solution, then receives an encrypted message from Johnny that shares the trouble they have been in on the prison ship. Khlyen overhears the conversation and heads the armada towards the prison to save Dutch. Meanwhile, on the prison ship, Johnny finds the Warden, with a stomach wound; he helps to bandage the wound, and she, in turn, helps him and Nucy (New Lucy) to take over control of the prison ship. There is tension between Sparlo and Coren, and Coren ends up killing Sparlo in cold blood. D'Avin finds the Qreshi sister, and the two of them and the Qreshi brother are put under guard. the siblings bicker about killing one another. Meanwhile, Dutch tries negotiating with the Qreshi uncle that arrives, but notices that he is stalling for time. Johnny and the Warden disable a bomb placed by one of the Qreshi guards. Nucy informs Dutch that the Qreshi uncle is trying to blow-up the prison ship. Coren is killed in the ensuing gunfight by Sparlo's former body guard. The Warden disables three other bombs. Johnny rescues D'Avin and the siblings. Johnny notices the armada heading towards them and uses the invisibility shields on the prison ship to hide the ship, while simultaneously setting off the Qreshi bombs outside of the ship. Khlyen thinks the prison ship has blown-up, and is very sad about losing Dutch. Johnny and Dutch have a heart-to-heart and agree that when the fight with The Lady is over, Johnny gets to take a one year sabbatical from being a killjoy, so that he can take care of his farm and robot goats and find a partner to share his life with.
47	7	"Cherchez La Bitch"	Paolo Barzman	Michelle Lovretta	August 30, 2019	257149-37
Johnny, D'Avin, Dutch and Calvert go to a "militainment" (military entertainment) event on Leith, in order to use their satellite to beam a microwave to Lucy (currently in The Lady's Armada hold) in order to digitally map the Armada and (hopefully) find The Lady (the original creature that is being used to create smokey box offspring). Meanwhile, Zeph, Pree, and Turin have left Old Town and met in a safe house, where they are trying to film and analyze a smoky box offspring. Zeph recognizes the shape of the offspring, but needs to go return to her lab in Old Town to run it through the system to figure out where she knows that shape from. Back in Old Town, Pree reunites with Gared who reveals that he has woken up to the truth and that he switched Pree's PDF. The shape does not appear in the database, but Zeph eventually realizes why she recognizes it. Also, she and Turin are separated after a guard accidentally shoots the smoky box and the offspring gets out. Fancy escapes from The Lady's Armada on Lucy. Fancy rescues Zeph from Old Town, then the two of them fly Lucy to pick up Johnny, D'Avin, Dutch, and Calvert on Leith. Lucy explains to Johnny that Nucy helped her to recover her files, and also claims that Nucy is their baby. Zeph tells everyone that she knows who to talk to about the offspring.
48	8	"Don't Stop Beweaving"	Paolo Barzman	Julian Doucet	September 6, 2019	257149-38
Johnny and D'Avin run a capture the flag team building event aboard the prison ship to train X-Wing to be soldiers; things go awry when a guard and several psych patients are mysteriously killed; turns out, the dis-loyal prison doctor did it, but Calvert takes him down with the flag pole. Zeph and Dutch head back to Zeph's family farm on Leith to look at the family tapestry (which is where she saw the offspring shape as a child). They are caught breaking into the special vault where the tapestry is held and are taken to see Zeph's mother. After sedating them and putting them in 'the pit', Zeph learns that her mother wanted her to have babies and lead their family, but Zeph rejects that future, nerve-pinches her mother, steals her mother's pendant, opens the vault, and downloads all the information from the tapestry, then finishes off by rejecting her blood-sister and telling Dutch that she is her real sister and they need to save their family. Meanwhile, Khlyen saves the body of The Lady and learns that she wants him to love her as a daughter; and they make a pact/truce.
49	9	"Terraformance Anxiety"	Stefan Pleszczynski	Adam Barken	September 13, 2019	257149-39
Aneela and Kendry appear on the prison ship and help broker a deal with the brother and sister Queshi to arm Dutch's army. Dutch wonders whose side Khlyen is on, while Aneela insists that he always fights for his family. Dutch, Johnny, and D'Avin, along with a team of prisoners mount a full-scale assault on the factory in Old Town. Zeph analyses the smoke being released in Old Town and notes that it is some kind of antidote. Khlyen is tricked by Gared into infiltrating the factory assault, and is captured by Dutch. Kylyen reveals that the antidote is the final phase in the strengthening of the giant offspring. Dutch decides to bomb Old Town to destroy all of the giant offspring. Pree and Turin lead a group of Westerlins out of Old Town. Zeph produces enough inhibitor to return the memories of all the rescued Westerlins. Khlyen tells Dutch that she made the wrong decision, and that it will mean the destruction of everything.
50	10	"Last Dance"	Stefan Pleszczynski	Michelle Lovretta	September 20, 2019	257149-40
Dutch uses Khlyen as bait to lead the human body of The Lady to Arkyn, then Aneela raises the shield around the planet. Aneela and Kendry gather the leaders of The Nine families on the Kin Rit estate on Qresh to collect their weapons codes to attack the Armada. Aneela senses Jaq is in danger and takes a ship to the Armada while it is being firebombed. Johnny, D'Avin, and Zeph infiltrate The Lady's Armada and meet Jaq along the way. Aneela distracts The Lady, while D'Avin, Johnny, and Jaq insert a freezing toxin into The Lady's filtration system, as well as a fire bomb; they freeze, then blow-up The Lady in her smoky box. Meanwhile, Lucy informs Zeph of the presence of Pip on the Armada, so Zeph rescues him. While it is unbelievable that it is really Pip, Zeph eventually (after completing many medical tests) accepts that it is and chooses to live in hope. Kendry makes Pree the governor of Westerly, to help all Westerlins relocate and rebuild. Aneela shares her remaining Green with Kendry, so that they can share a prolonged life together as rulers of the Quad and mothers to Jaq. Turin discovers that The Lady sent multiple Black Root ships off to other places full of offspring. Dutch turns the reassembled Level Six RAC into a force to hunt and destroy the offspring. Dutch tells D'Avin that she loves him too. Johnny says goodbye to Dutch, and Dutch tells him to take Lucy for his one year sabbatical. They get word of one offspring ship and Johnny suggests one last adventure together for Team Awesome Force.
