= Playtest (Black Mirror) =

- Black Mirror episode
- Cooper (Wyatt Russell) experiences SaitoGemu's augmented reality technology. An augmented Whac-A-Mole game was the initial inspiration for the episode.
- Episode no.: Series 3 Episode 2
- Directed by: Dan Trachtenberg
- Written by: Charlie Brooker
- Cinematography by: Aaron Morton
- Editing by: Matthew Cannings
- Original release date: 21 October 2016
- Running time: 57 minutes

Guest appearances
- Wyatt Russell as Cooper; Hannah John-Kamen as Sonja; Wunmi Mosaku as Katie; Ken Yamamura as Shou; Elizabeth Moynihan as Cooper's mother; Jamie Paul as Josh Peters

Episode chronology
← Previous "Nosedive"	Next → "Shut Up and Dance"

"Playtest" is the second episode in the third series of the British science fiction anthology television series Black Mirror. Written by series creator and showrunner Charlie Brooker and directed by Dan Trachtenberg, it premiered on Netflix on 21 October 2016, with the rest of series three.

The episode follows Cooper (Wyatt Russell), an American who playtests an upcoming augmented reality game in London while travelling. It is a horror game which accesses his brain and targets his fears. Hannah John-Kamen co-stars as a video game journalist Cooper meets. The episode was inspired by an idea Brooker had for an augmented reality Whac-A-Mole game which increased in speed until the subject went crazy. After considering Tokyo, the crew decided to shoot in London.

A work of psychological horror, the episode features numerous video game references and many instances of foreshadowing. The episode received a positive critical reception, with praise given to Trachtenberg's directing and Russell's acting while criticisms were levied towards the storyline and ending. The episode was nominated for a British Academy Television Craft Award, an RTS Craft & Design Award and a Visual Effects Society Award.

== Plot ==
After his father dies from Alzheimer's disease, Cooper (Wyatt Russell) travels the world, ignoring phone calls from his mother. In London, he spends a night with the technology journalist Sonja (Hannah John-Kamen). He is forced to stay with her after his bank account is drained when he becomes victim to identity theft, but finds a paid offer to playtest a game for SaitoGemu.

At the company's building, he is met by Katie (Wunmi Mosaku) in an experiment room. Though she turns his phone off, he turns it back on to surreptitiously take pictures of the test kit for Sonja. Katie implants a small device called a "mushroom" in the back of his neck. He tests an augmented reality version of the game Whac-A-Mole. Cooper is impressed and agrees to a further test. He meets with Shou (Ken Yamamura), the company's owner, and is told that he will experience a horror game where an artificial neural network personalises the experience to his fears.

At Harlech House, the mansion he recognises from a SaitoGemu game, Cooper has an earpiece to communicate with Katie; there are also cameras throughout. After a while, he sees a spider and then a figure appearing in a painting. He hears footsteps and sees a simulation of Josh Peters (Jamie Paul), his childhood bully. In the kitchen, an enormous spider with Peters' face appears. Cooper's earpiece then ceases to work. Sonja arrives and urges Cooper to leave, but Cooper finds inconsistencies in her story. She stabs him and they fight. As her face inverts to a red skull, Cooper impales her on the knife lodged through his shoulder, and she, the knife, and Cooper's injury disappear.

As earpiece communication resumes, Katie leads Cooper to an upstairs room to terminate the test. Katie begins interrogating Cooper as he forgets details about his mother and then himself. After he attempts to remove the mushroom with a shard of glass, Katie and Shou burst in and restrain him, saying that the technology has advanced too far to be removed.

Cooper awakens in Shou's office, the experiment having lasted only a single second and nothing subsequent having been real. Cooper returns home to find his mother (Elizabeth Moynihan), who does not recognise him, dialling his number repeatedly. Back in the first experiment room, Cooper yells for his mother as the mushroom kills him. Cooper was in fact killed within 0.04 seconds by a phone call from his mother causing signal interference with the device, the subsequent experience existing only in his head.

== Production ==
Whilst series one and two of Black Mirror were shown on Channel 4 in the UK, in September 2015 Netflix commissioned the series for twelve episodes (split into two series of six episodes). In March 2016, Netflix outbid Channel 4 for the rights to distributing the third series, with an offer of US$40 million. Due to its move to Netflix, the show had a larger budget than in previous series. "Playtest" is the second episode of the third series; all six episodes in the series were released on Netflix simultaneously on 21 October 2016. As Black Mirror is an anthology series, each installment is standalone. "Playtest" was placed second partly because Halloween was soon after the release date, though series creator Charlie Brooker commented that maybe it should not have been second as it is a "romp" rather than a "message episode".

External videos
- "Black Mirror – Season 3"; The trailer for series three of Black Mirror

The titles of the six episodes that make up the third series were announced in July 2016, along with the release date. A trailer for series three, featuring an amalgamation of clips and sound bites from the six episodes, was released by Netflix on 7 October 2016. "Playtest" was screened at the New York Comic Con in early October 2016.

=== Conception and writing ===
The first treatment of "Playtest" was written by Brooker, after which he worked on producing and refining a script with the director Dan Trachtenberg. Conceptually, Brooker was inspired with an idea where a person is given augmented reality implants to play a virtual Whac-A-Mole game which becomes repeatedly faster, causing the person to go crazy and be placed with numerous other subjects all traumatised by moles. However, this only proved to be enough material for a fifteen-minute episode. Brooker then conceived of adding a haunted house concept, where the augmented reality technology would dynamically change what the person saw in response to their fears.

Trachtenberg was introduced to the project around the time of his directorial debut in the horror film 10 Cloverfield Lane (2016). Brooker said that Trachtenberg was "adamant" that the story should be "one step ahead" of what viewers expect. Once they were working together, Trachtenberg and Brooker discovered that they had both previously been employed as video game journalists—Brooker for PC Zone and Trachtenberg for The Totally Rad Show. The extra twist at the end of the episode—in which Cooper is killed by his phone ringing—was not in the original treatment, but added later. Brooker commented that it was partly inspired by Daniel Mallory Ortberg, who wrote in an article: "Next on Black Mirror: what if phones, but too much?" Brooker compared the last twist to a "punch line" ending of a Twilight Zone episode, initially concerned that it would be too humorous, but finding it "harrowing and horrifying" in the edit. He later found that this episode's ending was the one most commonly misunderstood by viewers, though Trachtenberg's observation had been that most people understood the twist.

Some ideas for the episode were changed or unused. Cooper's relationship with his mother was changed, from her being neurotic and doting to Cooper taking her for granted. In one draft, Cooper was told he was a character in Black Mirror as a way of breaking the fourth wall. In this storyline, he would discover other characters and locations from previous episodes. Brooker also wished to have a Nightmare Mode, where different scenes would be shown to the viewer when they watched the episode a second time. Alternate scenes were a key concept of the later interactive film Black Mirror: Bandersnatch, which incorporated viewer decisions into the story.

=== Casting and filming ===
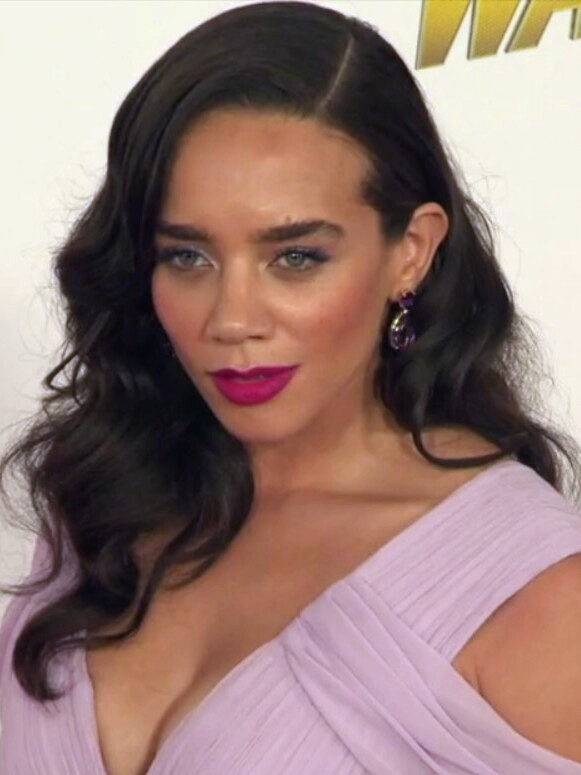
Hannah John-Kamen plays Sonja. She previously appeared in an unrelated minor role in "Fifteen Million Merits".

Wyatt Russell stars in the episode as Cooper. Trachtenberg said that this casting led to the character's arrogance being toned down so that the audience is "rooting for him to learn a lesson". Hannah John-Kamen appears in this episode as Sonja, after appearing briefly in the unrelated role of a singer in the series one episode "Fifteen Million Merits". Brooker noted that they were initially going to have the song John-Kamen sang in "Fifteen Million Merits" playing on the radio in one scene but were unable due to a licensing issue. Other roles include Wunmi Mosaku as Katie, who runs the experiment, and Ken Yamamura as Shou, the video game company owner.

"Playtest" was the last episode of the third series to be filmed. Initially, production would have taken place in Tokyo, a key hub for video game development, with mansion scenes filmed in the United Kingdom, but the writers found it difficult to explain in-story why such a house would exist in or near Japan. Instead, they decided to make the episode take place in London, a location they had ready access to but had not prominently featured in the series before. Exterior shots of SaitoGemu's headquarters used Englefield House. The sets for SaitoGemu were created from an abandoned school building, while scenes in Harlech House were filmed in the home of an elderly woman. The animation company Framestore worked on the effects, tasked with making the small realistic spider that Cooper first sees and the deformed version that later appears. Additional shots of the house for special effects were made by rendering the home within the Unity game engine.

Trachtenberg wanted to film scenes in order, but this was not always possible. He commented that some scenes are shot in a similar way to 10 Cloverfield Lane, including some scenes which were cut because of their similarities. In the early Harlech House scenes, Russell was encouraged to experiment with Cooper's reactions; for instance, a 14-minute take of Cooper insulting his childhood bully Josh Peters was filmed. Trachtenberg experimented with Russell and John-Kamen improvising, making them add lines to the middle or the end of their dialogue. Trachtenberg wanted the penultimate scene, with Cooper returning home, as a one-shot take, given the drastic change in tone it gave the episode.

== Analysis ==
The episode is a work of psychological horror; Adam Chitwood of Collider found it "genuinely terrifying", while Chancellor Agard of Entertainment Weekly believed it to contain "one of the show's most viscerally disturbing scenes". Charles Bramesco of Vulture compared it to the 1999 sci-fi thriller Existenz because of both works' focus on distorting reality. Reviewers found that the episode explored the themes of humans' flawed perception of reality. Rebecca Hawkes of The Telegraph said that the episode made a connection between "futuristic technology" and fears around the question "if we can't trust our own flawed senses, what on earth can we trust?" In relation to the mushroom drawing inspiration from Cooper's fears, Roxanne Sancto of Paste wrote that people have aimed to explore "this confrontation with the darkest corners of our subconscious" before modern technology, such as with dream analysis, hallucinogens or hypnosis. The character Katie says that the experimental technology adds "layers on top of reality", with Bramesco commenting that the episode's construction is this in reverse. Bryan Bishop of The Verge found that other themes covered include the ethics of experiments on human beings and the importance of resolving family issues.

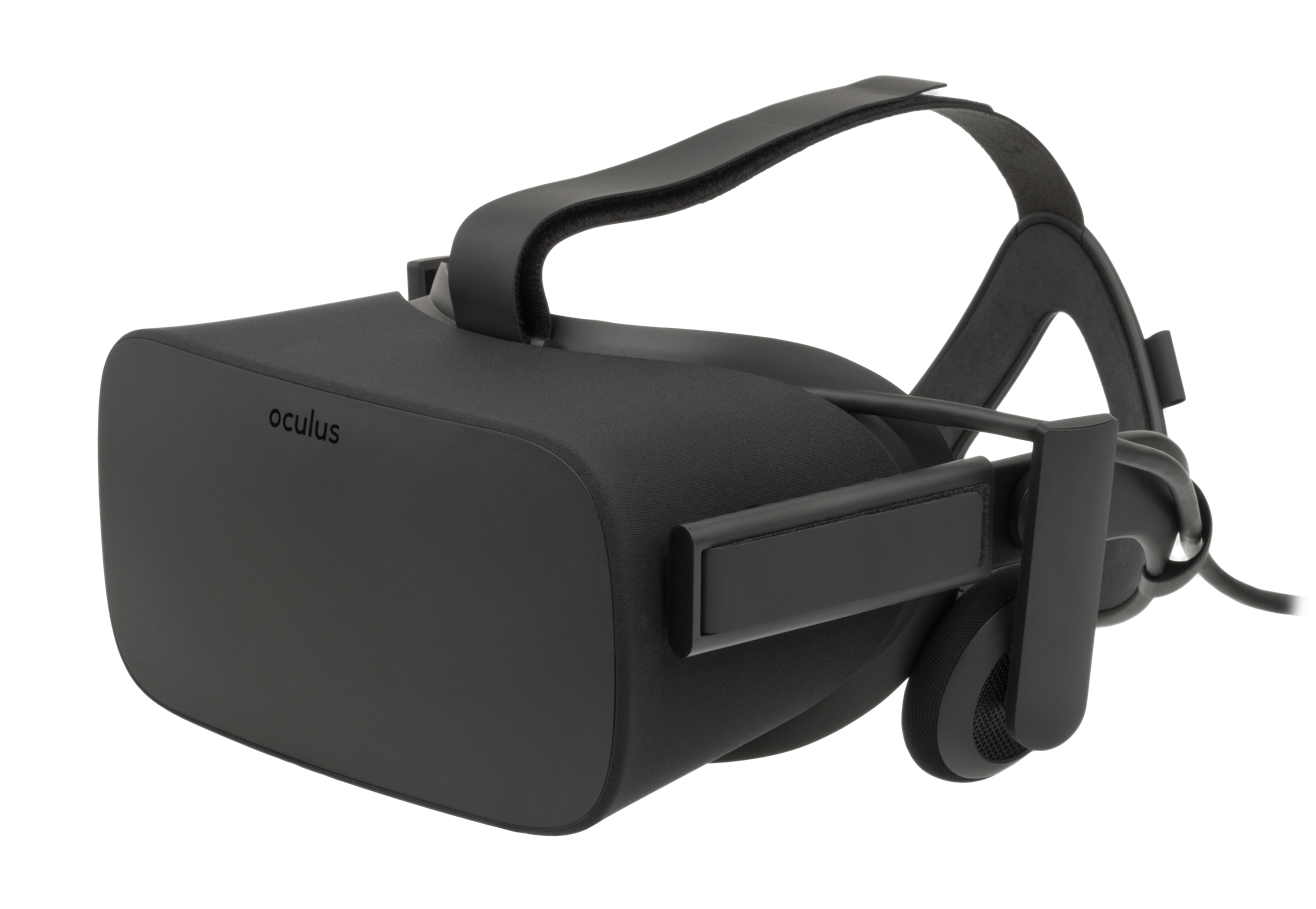
The "mushroom" technology which induces a virtual reality in Cooper's mind was compared to the existing technologies such as the Oculus Rift.

The primary technology of the episode drew comparisons to augmented reality and contemporary virtual reality technologies including Oculus Rift and Microsoft HoloLens. Bishop also compared it to an increase in demand for interactive entertainment such as escape rooms and immersive theatre. Agard said that the episode "takes the desire of escapism" in these forms of entertainment to a "deadly conclusion". Hawkes drew a "thematic link" between the technology and Cooper's fears of dementia, saying that "none of us are really in control of our own minds, memories and 'self'". Vox's Alex Abad-Santos interpreted the episode to make a broader point about the way smartphones have changed human interaction, observing that Cooper needs very little other than a smartphone to travel the world and meet people. Abad-Santos further said that though viewers may expect characters to be revealed as evil, none are, and concluded that "the greatest threat to yourself isn't the strangers you meet through your phone, but rather your own dishonesty".

The episode shows futuristic technology at the headquarters of SaitoGemu, Bishop describing the setting as "full of all-white rooms and silent worker bees tapping away dutifully behind minimalist visor displays". The later parts of the episode take place in a 19th-century gothic mansion, and the setting is contrasted with the holograms and futuristic technology of the episode. The episode uses foreshadowing: for instance, a flight attendant tells Cooper to turn off his phone during turbulence, similar to how his phone signal interference later causes the mushroom to glitch.

To hint that most of the episode takes place inside Cooper's mind, features from early scenes were incorporated as background elements later on. Cooper met Sonja at The Raven Pub, so finds Edgar Allan Poe's "The Raven" in Harlech House. A poster for the film Red Sonja in Sonja's apartment foreshadows her face being torn off. Cooper's method of killing Sonja by slamming her head onto the knife through his shoulder evokes the position in which the pair woke up that morning. Another act of foreshadowing is the movie Cooper watches on the plane about a monstrous spider, as he faces an enormous spider in Harlech House. Bishop saw the spider as a reference to the 1982 film The Thing. Cooper also sits next to a girl whose face is used for a creepy portrait and sees a SaitoGemu employee designing a costume which later appears on Josh Peters.

=== Cultural references ===
The episode contains a number of video game-related references. Trachtenberg included several of his favourite video games as props on a shelf in Sonja's room, while many video game consoles are seen at SaitoGemu. Matt Miller of Game Informer found a similarity between Shou and the "enigmatic nature" of the video game designer Hideo Kojima. Other references include a mural to Pac-Man that Cooper visits in London and non-video game references such as a copy of the 1997 action film Face/Off.

Harlech House resembles the house in the 1996 game Resident Evil, and Cooper's surname "Redfield" is another reference to the game. As Cooper approaches a door while speaking to the operator, she asks "would you kindly open the door?", an allusion to the phrase's usage in the 2007 game BioShock. This phrase related to whether players follow instructions unquestioningly, which Miller saw as related to its occurrence in "Playtest".

== Reception ==
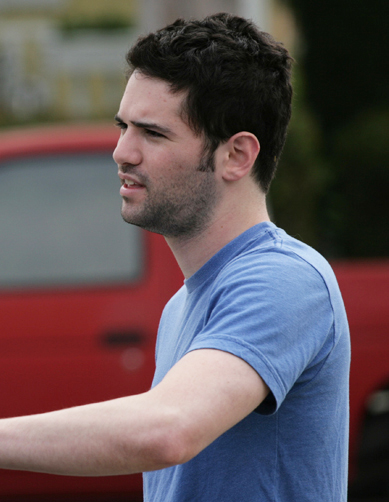
Dan Trachtenberg's directing was praised by critics.

On the review aggregator Rotten Tomatoes, 86% of 22 reviews are positive, with an average rating of 6.8/10. The site's summary describes that its "psychologically horrifying world ... is nicely counterbalanced by the sheer likability of the episode's protagonist". Hawkes rated the episode three stars out of five, while Sancto rated it 9.4 out of 10. "Playtest" garnered B ratings from Agard and The A.V. Club's Zach Handlen. Alex Mullane of Digital Spy called the episode the "most visceral and intense" of the show to date. Hawkes found it "enjoyably sinister".

The episode's plot and meaning received mixed reception and the ending was criticised. Bishop found that it "never digs particularly deep", and Handlen criticised "a disappointingly unfocused" plot about a "fairly cliched concept". David Sims of The Atlantic reviewed that the resolution to questions raised in the first half of the episode is "disappointingly facile". Hawkes saw the episode as choosing to "swap deeper probing for a succession of clever shocks". Handlen felt that there were too many twists, the final one being "a shrug of a conclusion that's little more than a dark joke". Sims said that the final reveal "feels a little forced, blunting the tragedy of Cooper's death". Bishop summarised the twists as "an endurance test of what-is-real fake-out endings". Nevertheless, Hawkes found it "bitterly funny" as a punchline and as keeping with the theme of the show. Sancto believed that the ending was "particularly powerful" and improved by Russell's "genuine expressions of hopelessness and confusion".

The directing, setting and effects garnered praise. Bishop reviewed that creepy moments and jump scares are built up well and timed appropriately. Bramesco found the approach to horror "sparing", and believed that it "works so fearsomely well". Sims praised that Trachtenberg is simultaneously able to draw attention to and joke about horror movie tropes "while still having the scares land". Mullane found Harlech House to be an "incredible set", also reviewing the special effects as "fantastic throughout". Agard commented that the pacing in the first half of the episode is slow, while Handlen reviewed that its hourlong runtime—lengthier than episodes in previous series—was "both a strength and its greatest weakness".

Russell's performance as Cooper received acclaim. Sims and Chitwood summarised his character as a "cheerful American fish-out-of-water" and "an ambitious and somewhat dim-witted American", respectively. Bramesco wrote that he "pulls off a difficult performance", whilst Mullane said that Russell was "so convincingly terrified and frazzled throughout that you'll forget you're watching a piece of fiction". Sancto said that Russell brought "vigorous emotion" to the role, while Sims said that he "makes the tonal shift feel subtle". Mullane additionally praised Hannah John-Kamen as "extremely likeable", and said that the pair had "strong" chemistry.

=== Black Mirror episode rankings ===
"Playtest" received mixed positions on many critics' rankings of the 23 episodes in the Black Mirror series, from best to worst.

- 6th – Aubrey Page, Collider
- 10th – Morgan Jeffery and Rosie Fletcher, Digital Spy
- 12th – Travis Clark, Business Insider
- 13th – Corey Atad, Esquire
- 13th – Charles Bramesco, Vulture
- 15th – Ed Power, The Telegraph
- 16th – James Hibberd, Entertainment Weekly
- 19th – Matt Donnelly and Tim Molloy, TheWrap

IndieWire authors ranked the 22 Black Mirror episodes excluding Bandersnatch by quality, giving "Playtest" a position of 10th. Eric Anthony Glover of Entertainment Tonight found the episode to be the worst of the 19 episodes from series one to four. Meanwhile, Brian Tallerico of Vulture rated Russell's performance the sixth best of Black Mirror, praising him as "a truly charismatic and engaging actor". Additionally, Proma Khosla of Mashable ranked the same episodes by tone, concluding that "Playtest" was the fourth most bleak.

Other critics ranked the 13 episodes in Black Mirror's first three series.

- 5th – Jacob Hall, /Film
- 7th – Andrew Wallenstein, Variety
- 8th – Adam David, CNN Philippines
- 9th – Mat Elfring, GameSpot

Some critics ranked the six episodes from series three of Black Mirror in order of quality.

- 4th – Liam Hoofe, Flickering Myth
- 4th – Jacob Stolworthy and Christopher Hooton, The Independent

=== Awards ===
For their work on visual effects in "Playtest", multiple individuals and groups were nominated for a British Academy Television Craft Award, a Royal Television Society Craft & Design Award and a Visual Effects Society Award in 2017. The episode was also submitted for consideration alongside "Nosedive" and "San Junipero" for an Art Directors Guild award for Excellence in Production Design for a Television Movie or Limited Series, for which it was nominated.

List of awards and nominations received by "Playtest"
Year	Award	Category	Recipients	Result	Ref.
2017	BAFTA Craft Awards	Best Special, Visual and Graphic Effects	Justin Hutchinson-Chatburn, Framestore, Glassworks, Baseblack	Nominated	
2017	RTS Craft & Design Awards	Effects – Digital	Justin Hutchinson-Chatburn, Framestore, Glassworks, Painting Practice	Nominated	
2017	Visual Effects Society Awards	Outstanding Visual Effects in a Photoreal Episode	Justin Hutchinson-Chatburn, Russell McLean, Grant Walker, Christopher Gray	Nominated	

== See also ==
- "Perchance to Dream" – an episode of The Twilight Zone with a similar twist
