= Hannah John-Kamen =

British actress (born 1989)

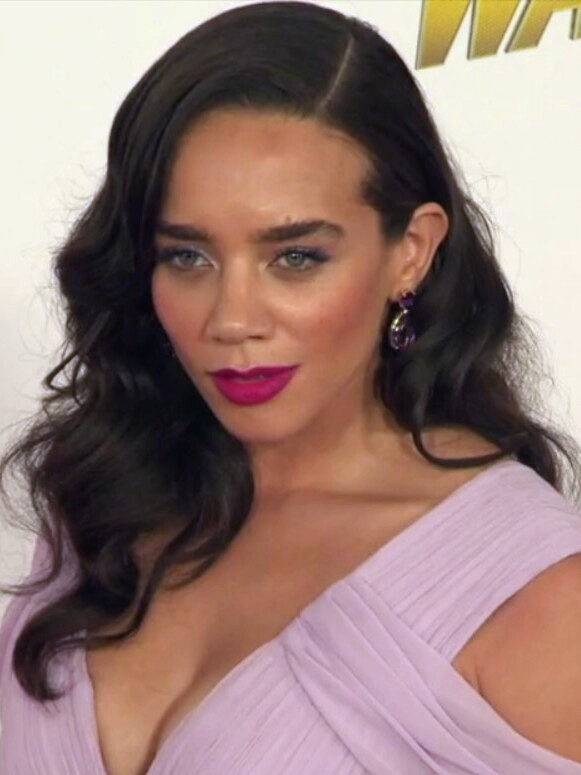
- John-Kamen in 2018
- Born: 7 September 1989 (age 37); Hull, East Yorkshire, England
- Education: Royal Central School of Speech and Drama
- Occupation: Actress
- Years active: 2011–present

Hannah Dominique John-Kamen (born 7 September 1989) is an English actress. She is known for her television roles in Black Mirror (2011–2016), Killjoys (2015–2019), Brave New World (2020), and Netflix miniseries The Stranger (2020). She has portrayed Ava Starr / Ghost in the Marvel Cinematic Universe. She also starred in films including SAS: Red Notice (2021), Resident Evil: Welcome to Raccoon City (2021) and Unwelcome (2023).

== Early life ==
Hannah John-Kamen was born in Hull, the daughter of a Norwegian fashion model mother and a Nigerian forensic psychologist father. She has an older brother and an older sister. She attended primary school in nearby Kirk Ella, received her secondary education at Hull Collegiate School, and trained at the National Youth Theatre. John-Kamen moved to London at the age of 18. In 2012, she graduated from the Central School of Speech and Drama.

== Career ==
John-Kamen began her career in 2011, providing voice work for the video game Dark Souls. She went on to make appearances in episodes of television series Misfits (2011), Black Mirror (2011), Whitechapel (2012), The Syndicate (2012), The Midnight Beast (2012) and The Hour (2012).

From 11 December 2012 to 29 June 2013, she took the lead role of Viva in the Spice Girls-themed West End musical Viva Forever! The musical premiered at the Piccadilly Theatre to largely negative reviews. The Daily Mirror, however, praised John-Kamen's performance and called it a "shame" that she and the rest of the cast were "let down by a clichéd plot and leaden dialogue". In 2014, she had a guest role in an episode of Death in Paradise and a recurring role in Happy Valley. The following year, John-Kamen started in two television series penned by Russell T Davies, Cucumber and its sequel Banana.

In 2015, John-Kamen made her film debut in Star Wars: The Force Awakens, and had a main starring role in the SyFy space adventure series Killjoys and remained in the show until its final episode in 2019. In 2016, she had a guest-star role as Ornela in the HBO series Game of Thrones. That year, she appeared in the Black Mirror episode "Playtest" and an episode of The Tunnel.

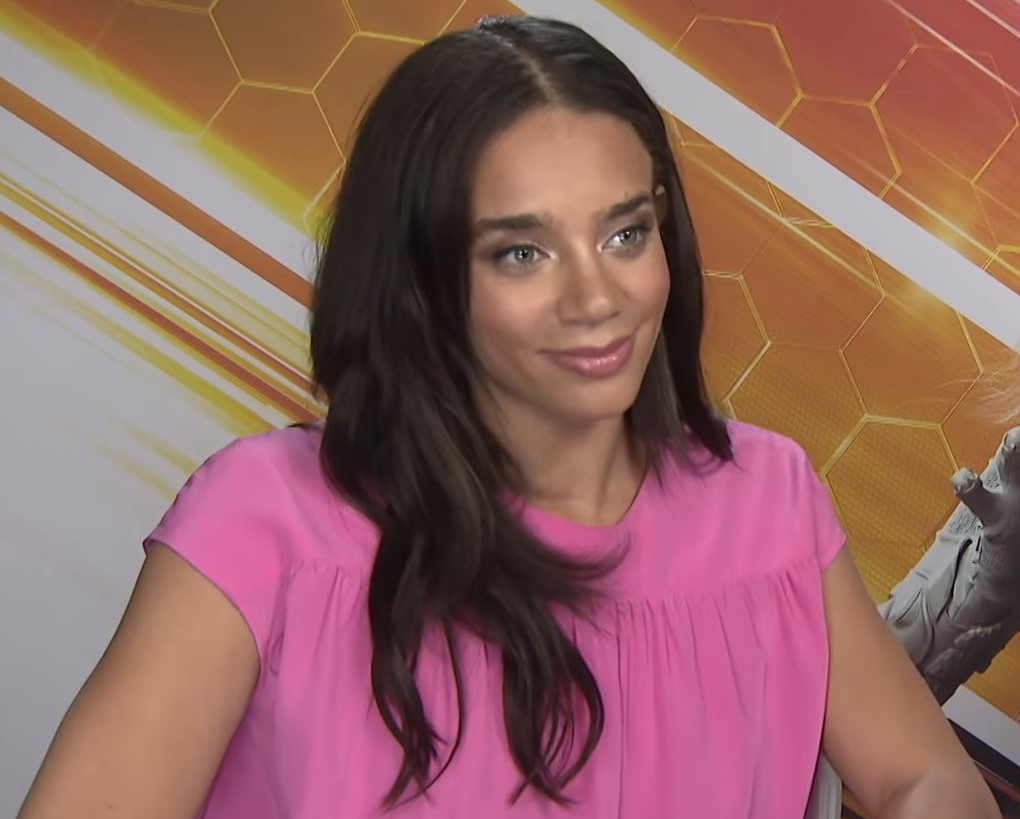
John-Kamen in 2018

John-Kamen's next film role was in Tomb Raider in 2018. Later that year she starred in Steven Spielberg's Ready Player One. Addressing John-Kamen's role in the film, Kristen Tauer wrote, "While much of Ready Player One takes place in a virtual reality world, Hannah John-Kamen's character is unique in that she is rooted in the reality throughout the film." That same year, John-Kamen played Ava Starr / Ghost in the superhero film Ant-Man and the Wasp. In 2021, John-Kamen starred in the action-thriller film SAS: Red Notice and portrayed Jill Valentine in the reboot film Resident Evil: Welcome to Raccoon City. She was cast as Red Sonja in the upcoming film by the same name from Millennium Films but reportedly left the project for unknown reasons.

In 2023, John-Kamen starred in the folk horror film Unwelcome alongside Douglas Booth. In 2025, John-Kamen starred opposite Lucien Laviscount in the action film Safe House, and reprised her role as Ava Starr / Ghost in Thunderbolts* (2025); it was announced that same year that she would also reprise the role in Avengers: Doomsday (2026).

== Personal life ==
John-Kamen enjoys playing the piano and is trained in various styles of dance such as ballet, cabaret, jazz, salsa and tap.

== Filmography ==
Key
†	Denotes films that have not yet been released

=== Film ===
Year	Title	Role	Notes
2015	Star Wars: The Force Awakens	First Order Officer	
2018	Tomb Raider	Sophie	
2018	Ready Player One	F'Nale Zandor	
2018	Ant-Man and the Wasp	Ava Starr / Ghost	
2021	SAS: Red Notice	Dr. Sophie Hart	
2021	Resident Evil: Welcome to Raccoon City	Jill Valentine	
2023	Unwelcome	Maya	
2023	Breaking Point	Kate	
2025	Thunderbolts*	Ava Starr / Ghost	
2025	Safe House	Agent Owens	
2026	Avengers: Doomsday †	Ava Starr / Ghost	Post-production
2027	One Second After †	Makalya	Post-production

=== Television ===
Year	Title	Role	Notes
2011	Misfits	Carly	1 episode
2011	Black Mirror	Selma Telse	Episodes: "Fifteen Million Merits"
2012	Whitechapel	Roxy	2 episodes
2012	The Syndicate	Young Shop Assistant	1 episode
2012	The Midnight Beast	Pizza Girl	1 episode
2012	The Hour	Rosa Maria Ramírez	4 episodes
2014	Death in Paradise	Yasmin Blake	1 episode
2014	Happy Valley	Justine	4 episodes
2015	Cucumber	Violet	2 episodes
2015	The Ark	Nahlab	Television film
2015	Banana	Violet	2 episodes
2015–2019	Killjoys	Yalena "Dutch" Yardeen	Main role, 50 episodes
2016	The Tunnel: Sabotage	Rosa Persaud	5 episodes
2016	Game of Thrones	Ornela	Episodes: "Oathbreaker" and "Book of the Stranger"
2016	Black Mirror	Sonja	Episode: "Playtest"
2019	The Dark Crystal: Age of Resistance	Naia (voice)	Recurring role, 5 episodes
2020	The Stranger	The Stranger	Miniseries, 8 episodes
2020	Brave New World	Wilhelmina "Helm" Watson	Main role, 9 episodes

=== Stage ===
Year	Title	Role	Notes
2012–2013	Viva Forever!	Viva	Piccadilly Theatre

=== Video games ===
Year	Title	Role	Notes
2011	Dark Souls	Lord's Blade Ciaran	Voice
2014	Dark Souls II	Sweet Shalquoir	Voice

=== Music videos ===
Year	Artist	Title
2015	The Chemical Brothers	"Sometimes I Feel So Deserted"
2019	Sun Silva	"Just the Romantic"
