= Killjoys =

2015 Canadian space adventure drama series

- Title card since the second season
- Genre: Science fiction; Drama; Adventure
- Created by: Michelle Lovretta
- Starring: Hannah John-Kamen; Aaron Ashmore; Luke Macfarlane
- Opening theme: "Westerley Theme" by Finny and Katie McConnell (season 1); "Happy Damage" by Jacuzzi Boys (seasons 2–5)
- Country of origin: Canada
- Original language: English
- No. of seasons: 5
- No. of episodes: 50 (list of episodes)

Production
- Executive producers: David Fortier; Ivan Schneeberg; Karen Troubetzkoy; Michelle Lovretta
- Running time: 42 minutes
- Production companies: Mendacity Pictures; Bell Media; Universal Cable Productions; Temple Street Productions

Original release
- Network: Space; CTV Sci-Fi Channel (season 5)
- Release: June 19, 2015 – September 20, 2019

Killjoys is a Canadian space adventure drama television series that aired on Space (now CTV Sci-Fi) in Canada. Primarily a science fiction series, Killjoys follows a trio of hard-living bounty hunters—Dutch (Hannah John-Kamen), Johnny (Aaron Ashmore), and D'avin (Luke Macfarlane).

The series ran for five seasons, ending in 2019. It was officially ordered to series on October 7, 2013, with a 10-episode pick-up. In April 2014, it was announced that Syfy would co-produce the series, and the first season premiered June 19, 2015. In September 2017, Syfy renewed the series for a fourth and a fifth season, each to consist of 10 episodes. The fifth and final season premiered July 19, 2019, and concluded on September 20, 2019.

Throughout its run, the series received generally positive reviews and was nominated for several accolades, including two Canadian Screen Awards nominations and three Prix Aurora Awards nominations.

== Premise ==
Killjoys follows a trio of hard-living bounty hunters – Dutch, John, and D'avin. Working for the Reclamation Apprehension Coalition (RAC), they work in a four planet-and-moon system known as the Quad. Taking on warrants to apprehend people or property, RAC Agents are given high authority by their agency. As part of their job, they swear to remain neutral in conflicts and owe no allegiance to any system, government, or other organizations. With their pasts coming back to haunt them, the trio will have to work hard to keep themselves, and their friends, alive.

Season	Episodes	Originally released	
Season	Episodes	First released	Last released
1	10	June 19, 2015	August 21, 2015
2	10	July 1, 2016	September 2, 2016
3	10	June 30, 2017	September 1, 2017
4	10	July 20, 2018	September 21, 2018
5	10	July 19, 2019	September 20, 2019

== Cast ==
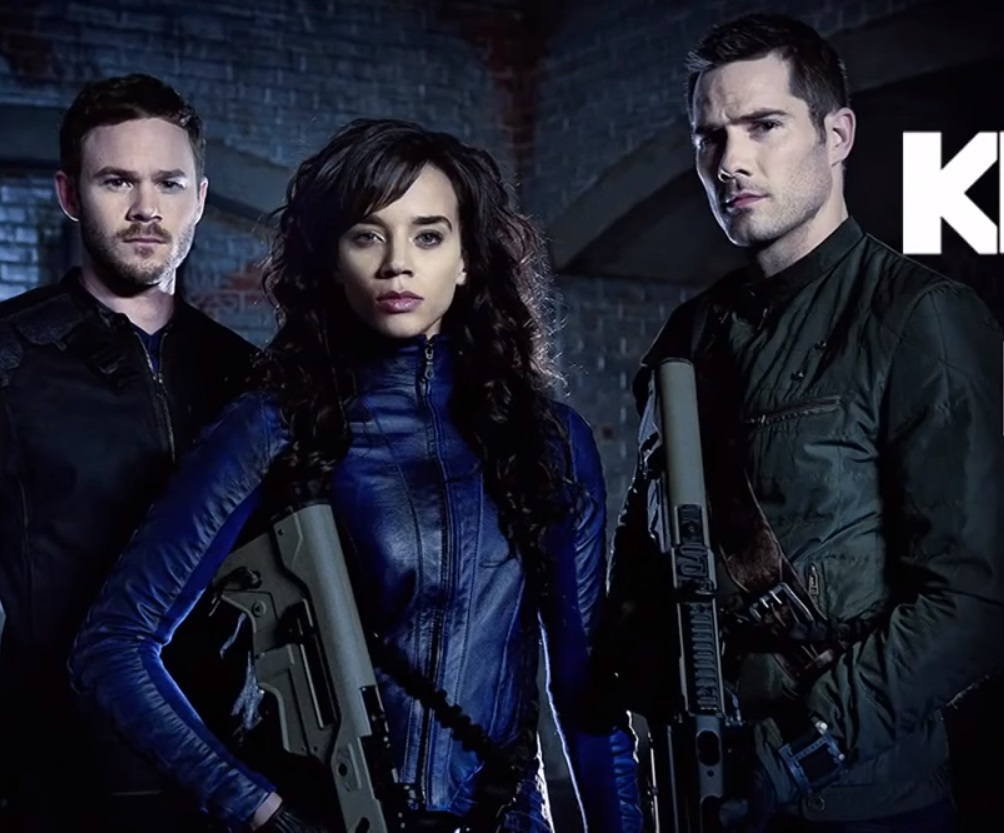
The main cast for the series, from left to right: Aaron Ashmore, Hannah John-Kamen and Luke Macfarlane.

=== Main ===
- Hannah John-Kamen as Yalena "Dutch" Yardeen, a level five RAC agent with a secret history who was raised by RAC officer Khlyen.
  - Also as Aneela Kin Rit, Khlyen's daughter, initially seen as a prisoner of the Hullen who mysteriously is physically identical to Dutch, later revealed to have created Dutch from the Green Plasma (which she also uses to control the Hullen) with her own DNA – naming her Yalena after their mother. (seasons 2–5)
- Aaron Ashmore as John Andras "Johnny" Jaqobis, a level three (later five) RAC agent. Dutch's RAC partner of six years and her best friend, he handles the technical aspects of their missions.
- Luke Macfarlane as D'avin Jaqobis, Johnny's older brother, a former soldier and indentured fighter who becomes a RAC bounty hunter to join and help his brother and Dutch.

=== Recurring ===
- Thom Allison as Prima "Pree" Dezz, a former warlord who owns the Royale bar
- Nora McLellan as Bellus Haardy, a former RAC agent who works as a warrant broker (seasons 1–2)
- Frank Moore as Hillary "Hills" Oonan, a senior Company Security Force Officer in Old Town on Westerly (seasons 1–2, 4)
- Sean Baek as Fancy Lee, a RAC agent and previously a Hullen who served as Khlyen's right-hand man before he was cleansed
- Morgan Kelly as Alvis Akari, a rebel organizer and Scarback monk (seasons 1–3)
- Tamsen McDonough as Lucy, the artificial intelligence that runs Dutch's ship
- Patrick Garrow as Alfred Olyevich Turin, a high ranking RAC officer who is highly suspicious of Dutch and her team
- Rob Stewart as Khlyen Kin Rit, RAC agent, Dutch's former mentor, and her and Aneela's father
- Sarah Power as Illenore Pawter Seyah Simms, also known as Pawter Simms, an heir to one of the nine royal Qreshi families who works as a doctor living in Old Town on Westerley (seasons 1–2, 4)
- Mayko Nguyen as Delle Seyah Kendry, a member of the Nine Families' aristocracy
- Tori Anderson as Sabine, a bartender at the Royale bar (season 2)
- Pascal Langdale as Liam Jelco, a Company Officer (seasons 2–3)
- Stephanie Leonidas and Tommie-Amber Pirie as Clara/Olli, a human with extensive cybernetic modifications (seasons 2–3)
- Gavin Fox as Gared, who works in Pree's bar and becomes his lover (seasons 2–5)
- Ted Atherton as Gander, Aneela's second-in-command (season 3)
- Kelly McCormack as Zephyr "Zeph" Vos, a highly intelligent RAC technician who often assists the team (seasons 3–5)
- Atticus Mitchell as Pippin "Pip" Foster, a man with many contacts who assists the Killjoys, for a price (seasons 3–5)
- Jaeden Noel as Jaq, Aneela's, Delle Seyah's, and D'avin's preternaturally aged son, who possesses special abilities and who is feared by the Lady (seasons 4–5)
- Alanna Bale as the Lady, the leader of the Hullen (season 5)
- Rachael Ancheril as the Warden (Rennika) runs the SuperMax prison ship (season 5)

== Production ==
On September 1, 2015, Syfy announced it would renew Killjoys for a second season of 10 episodes. Bill McGoldrick, Syfy's executive VP of original content was quoted as saying "With exciting space-based action, deep world building, and a standout cast, Killjoys has struck a nerve with viewers and critics alike. We can't wait to see what adventures Michelle Lovretta and Temple Street take Dutch, John and D'avin on in season two." Of the renewal, David Fortier and Ivan Schneeberg, the executive producers of the show, said, "We couldn't be more excited to bring back Killjoys and its stellar cast to audiences across the U.S. We look forward to working with the team at Syfy for a thrilling second season."

Starting with the fourth season, Adam Barken became the showrunner of the series, with Michelle Lovretta remaining with the production as an executive producer and writer.

== Broadcast ==
Killjoys premiered June 19, 2015, in both Canada and the United States, and episodes aired simultaneously on the two channels each Friday. It premiered in UK on January 25, 2016, and in Australia on January 30, 2016. In July 2018, Ellation announced that the first through third seasons would stream exclusively on its VRV subscription service.

== Reception ==
Throughout its run, the series received generally positive reviews. The first episode of the series received 286,000 overnight viewers in Canada. Charlie Jane Anders of io9 gave the show a very positive rating:

If wanting to watch fun, quippy characters get into scrapes and survive by the skin of their teeth, on spaceships and alien planets, is wrong, I don't want to be right. Killjoys has just the right mix of guns, high-tech knives, assassins, cage fights, missions to hostile planets, dark secrets, tiny robot weapons and general space headbutting thrills to be the perfect treat for Friday nights.

Noting others' negative reviews, she went on to state "[w]e don't need every television show to be True Detective or even Battlestar Galactica." Writing for Forbes.com, Merrill Barr reviewed the first four episodes in a review titled "Sci-Fi Fun With Nothing Else To Offer", opining that though enjoyable for sci-fi fans, it featured "sci-fi archetypes that aren't bringing anything new to the table", an "overly complicated" fictional universe, and was "extremely light on depth and character intrigue". Rotten Tomatoes gave the first season a score of 82% based on reviews from 17 critics and the series an overall score of 95%. On Metacritic the series has a score of 53% based on reviews from 8 critics.

=== Awards and nominations ===
Year	Award	Category	Nominee	Result	Ref.
2015	IGN Awards	Best TV Sci-Fi Series	Killjoys	Nominated	
2016	Canadian Screen Awards	Best Achievement in Makeup	Colin Penman, Ryan Reed	Nominated	
2016	Canadian Screen Awards	Best Visual Effects	Krista Allain, Igor Avdyushin, Jason Gougeon, Ran Long Wen, Ben Mossman, Yuhay-Ray Ng, Chris Ross, Kyle Sim, Somboun Souannhaphanh, Edward J. Taylor IV	Nominated	
2016	Prix Aurora Awards	Best Visual Presentation	Killjoys	Nominated	
2017	Prix Aurora Awards	Best Visual Presentation	Michelle Lovretta	Nominated	
2017	Young Artist Awards	Best Performance in a TV Series – Guest Starring Young Actor	Jack Fulton	Nominated	
2018	Prix Aurora Awards	Best Visual Presentation	Michelle Lovretta	Nominated	

== See also ==
- List of science fiction television programs
- List of science fiction TV and radio shows produced in Canada
