= SAS: Red Notice =

2021 film by Magnus Martens

- Theatrical release poster
- Directed by: Magnus Martens
- Screenplay by: Laurence Malkin
- Based on: SAS: Red Notice by Andy McNab
- Produced by: Joe Simpson; Kwesi Dickson; Andy McNab; Laurence Malkin
- Starring: Sam Heughan; Ruby Rose; Andy Serkis; Hannah John-Kamen; Tom Hopper; Noel Clarke; Owain Yeoman; Ray Panthaki; Anne Reid; Tom Wilkinson; Jing Lusi
- Cinematography: Nick Remy Matthews
- Edited by: Megan Gill
- Music by: Benji Merrison
- Production companies: Ingenious Media; Silver Reel; Creativity Capital; Parabolic Pictures; Altitude Film Entertainment; The Electric Shadow Company; J3 Film Finance; Lipsync Productions; Hero Squared
- Distributed by: Sky Cinema
- Release date: 12 March 2021 (United Kingdom)
- Running time: 124 minutes
- Country: United Kingdom
- Language: English
- Box office: $198,432

SAS: Red Notice (also known as SAS: Rise of the Black Swan) is a 2021 British action thriller film directed by Magnus Martens, based on the novel of the same name by Andy McNab, and starring Sam Heughan, Ruby Rose, Andy Serkis, Hannah John-Kamen, Tom Hopper, Noel Clarke, Owain Yeoman, Ray Panthaki, Anne Reid and Tom Wilkinson in his final film role before his death in December 2023. Sky Cinema released SAS: Red Notice in the United Kingdom on 12 March 2021.

== Plot ==
Black Swans is a family-owned private military company led by American citizens William Lewis and his adult children Grace and Oliver. SAS commander George Clements hires them to clear a remote village in Georgia for a transnational Britgaz gas pipeline. When the villagers resist, Black Swans massacre them. Their atrocities are secretly filmed, leading to red notices and accusations of crimes against humanity. The International Criminal Court demands that the UK government extradite the accused, who live in North London, to the Hague to stand trial. Prime Minister Atwood secretly orders Clements to kill rather than arrest William on the scene to cover up his involvement. William orders his children and the rest of the team to escape to the United States while he and some of his loyal men stall the SAS.

SAS operator Tom Buckingham, who was involved in serving the red notice, takes his girlfriend, Dr Sophie Hart, on a train journey from London to Paris where he intends to propose to her. Sophie is unsure whether they understand each other properly, whereas Tom is unsure whether he truly loves her. The Black Swans remnants, led by Grace Lewis, hijack their train while it is en route to the English Channel, to blow the gas pipe network there as payback, taking all of the passengers on board hostage at gunpoint. Using his military skills, Tom escapes from the train and evades capture. When he attempts to rescue Sophie, she refuses to leave the other passengers, who may need medical assistance, and she asks him to save a young girl.

Tom regularly updates his position and sends intelligence to Declan Smith, a member of the SAS Counter Terrorism Team and his friend. Declan, who has been bribed by the Black Swans, sends a rescue team into a trap. Grace asks for a $500 million ransom from Britgaz or else she will blow up the tunnel and reveal the secret Britgaz gas pipeline in the tunnel. After inviting Clements to negotiate, Grace has one of her team secretly record their conversation as insurance. Grace finds out via Declan that Tom's girlfriend is on the train and takes her hostage. Tom returns to the train, but he fails to rescue Sophie. Grace escapes with her through the gas pipeline, pursued by Tom. Grace's team uploads the video of Clements and tries to escape among the hostages, but SAS snipers kill them. Upon not finding Grace among the hostages, Clements realises that Declan is guilty.

Once out of the pipe, Grace blows up the pipeline, and Tom narrowly escapes. Clements and all of the SAS operatives excluding Declan appear to be killed in the explosion. Grace stabs Sophie in her thigh and runs away. Sophie says she finally understands Tom and asks him to catch Grace instead of being with her. After catching up with Grace, they fight and Grace is fatally injured. Grace praises Tom's tenacity and offers him to be her successor to rebuild the Black Swans. Tom rejects the offer and finishes off Grace. Tom realises that he loves Sophie; during their trip, Tom proposes to her. She refuses at first, believing him incapable of love, but agrees after seeing his emotional reaction. The British prime minister and Britgaz representative are questioned, and all blame is transferred to Declan, the sole surviving member of Grace's team. Tom and Sophie get married in Spain; during the ceremony, Tom is briefed by Clements, who survived the explosion, to find Declan.

== Cast ==
- Sam Heughan as Tom Buckingham
- Ruby Rose as Grace Lewis
- Andy Serkis as SAS Commander George Clements
- Hannah John-Kamen as Sophie Hart
- Tom Hopper as Declan Smith
- Noel Clarke as Major Bisset
- Owain Yeoman as Oliver Lewis
- Jing Lusi as Zada
- Ray Panthaki as Prime Minister Atwood
- Richard McCabe as Callum
- Douglas Reith as Sir Charles Whiteside
- Anne Reid as Charlotte
- Tom Wilkinson as William Lewis

== Production ==
It was announced in November 2018 that filming had begun in Budapest on the film. Filming continued to February 2019, including London and Paris.

== Release ==
Sky Cinema released the film on 12 March 2021. In February 2021, Vertical Entertainment and Redbox Entertainment acquired U.S. distribution rights to the film and set it for a 16 March 2021 release.

Warner Bros. Home Entertainment released SAS: Red Notice on DVD and Blu-ray under Universal Pictures Home Entertainment on 12 July 2021. The film was retitled SAS: Rise of the Black Swan on Netflix to avoid confusion with the Netflix-produced film Red Notice, which was also released in 2021.

== Reception ==
According to the review aggregator website Rotten Tomatoes, 52% of critics have given the film a positive review based on 21 reviews; the average rating is 5.10/10. The critics consensus reads: "Whether it's called SAS: Red Notice or SAS: Rise of the Black Swan, this is a thoroughly mediocre action thriller."
