= Joe Henry Peeples Jr. =

American politician

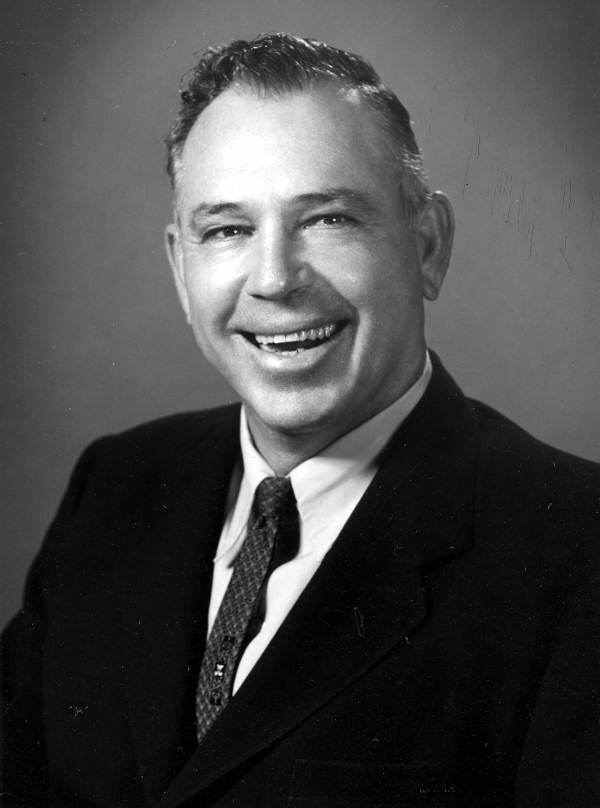

Member of the Florida House of Representatives from the Glades County district
- In office 1942–1965

Personal details
- Born: January 22, 1914 Zolfo Springs, Florida
- Died: August 18, 1988 (aged 74) Glades County, Florida
- Party: Democratic
- Spouse: Emma Laura Bethea

Joseph Henry Peeples Jr. (January 22, 1914 – August 18, 1988), known as Joe Henry Peeples Jr., was a Florida state legislator. He served in the Florida House of Representatives for Glades County for 22 years.

Peeples was born in Zolfo Springs, Florida in 1914, one of five children of Joseph Henry Peeples Sr. (1869–1942) and Sweet Hogan. His father, known as Joe Henry Sr., served in the House of Representatives for Glades County from 1929 to 1934 and 1937 to 1941. Joe Henry Jr. attended county schools, graduating from Moore Haven High School in 1931. He worked at his father's ranch while attending schools and was also on the school basketball team. After finishing school, he worked in the cattle ranching business with his father until Joe Henry Sr.'s death in 1942.

Although a resident of Highlands County at the time, when his father died, Joe Henry Jr. was elected to finish his term as representative for Glades County. He was re-elected repeatedly until retiring in 1965. During his time in the house, he served as president of the livestock committee, and as a member of the salt water fisheries, fish and game, and finance and taxation committees. He also was chairman of the Water Resources Development & Conservation Committee and Dean of the House on one occasion.

Peeples was married to Emma Laura Bethea in February 1940, who he had three children with, Joan (born 1941), Joseph Henry III (born 1944), and John Hosia (born 1950). He was also a member of the Florida Cattlemen's Association and the Baptist church. He enjoyed hunting and fishing as recreational interests. He died in 1988 and was interred at Ortona Cemetery in Glades County.
