= Peeple (app) =

Mobile app for reviewing people

- Developers: Nicole McCullough and Julia Cordray
- Release: March 7, 2016
- Type: Social networking

Peeple was a mobile application that was intended to allow people to leave recommendations for other people based on professional, personal, and romantic relationships. Initially described as a "Yelp for People", the original announcement in October 2015 drew criticism over concerns of harassment, and its creators launched a "watered-down" version of Peeple in March 2016. Many critics have noted the similarity of the application to the "Nosedive" episode of the science fiction anthology series Black Mirror as well as other fictional works about social media with themes of gender and obsession with image.

The company was founded in April 2014 by Nicole McCullough and CEO Julia Cordray.

== History ==
The company's plans for their application were announced in September 2015, and received widespread criticism over concerns of cyberbullying and harassment. By late October, the service had been redesigned as "opt-in", so that people could only be rated if they had registered with the service. Users would also have the option to veto reviews they disliked, with negative reviews never becoming visible without the subject's permission. The initial beta version was tested by 10,000 users.

Peeple was officially released on March 7, 2016. The launched application was described by the New York Post as "friendlier" and more "watered-down" than the version described in 2015, lacking a star-rating system and allowing users to choose which comments appeared on their profiles.

== See also ==
- Reputation management
- Recommender system
- Impression management
- Rating site
- Review site
