= Hoxton =

Neighbourhood in London, England

Coordinates: 51.534°N 0.085°W

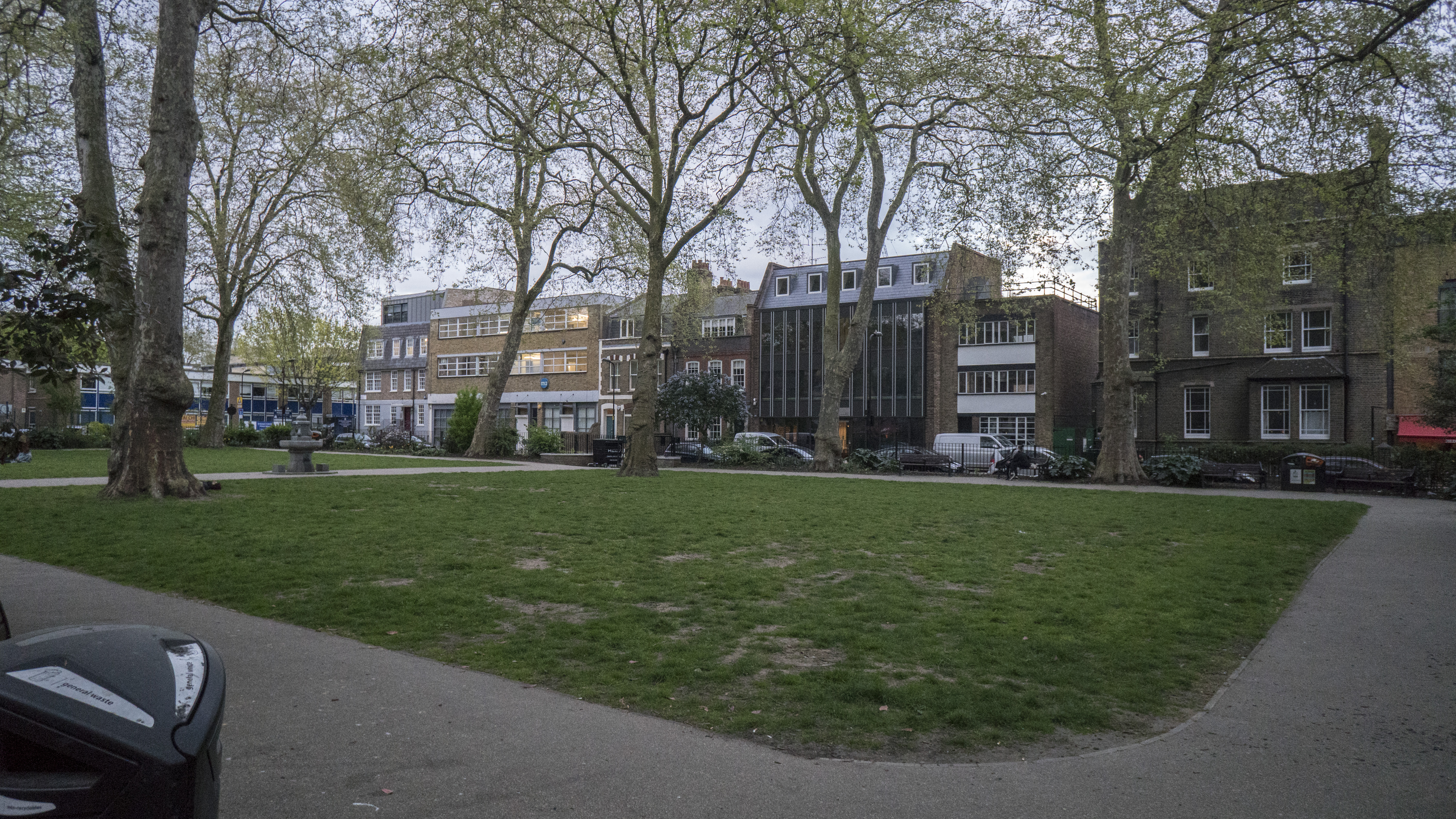
- Hoxton Square Park in 2017

- Location within Greater London
- OS grid reference: TQ335835
  - Charing Cross: 2.7 mi (4.3 km) SW
- London borough: Hackney
- Ceremonial county: Greater London
- Region: London
- Country: England
- Sovereign state: United Kingdom
- Post town: LONDON
- Postcode district: E2
- Postcode district: N1
- Dialling code: 020
- Police: Metropolitan
- Fire: London
- Ambulance: London
- UK Parliament: Hackney South and Shoreditch
- London Assembly: North East

Hoxton is an area in the London Borough of Hackney, England. It was historically in the county of Middlesex until 1889. Hoxton lies north-east of the City of London, is considered to be a part of London's East End and was once part of the civil parish and subsequent Metropolitan Borough of Shoreditch, prior to its incorporation into Hackney.

The area is generally considered to be bordered by Regent's Canal on the north side, Wharf Road and City Road to the west, Old Street to the south, and Kingsland Road to the east.

== History ==
=== Origins ===
A map showing Hoxton ward of Shoreditch Metropolitan Borough as it appeared in 1916.

The earliest recorded names of the settlement are Hochestone, in the Domesday Book in 1086, and Hocston, which is mentioned in a fine of 1220–1221. The name is likely to derive from the possessive form of a person's name, possibly Hocg, and the Old English word tun, meaning a fortified enclosure, village, or manor. Little is recorded of the origins of the settlement, though there was Roman activity around Ermine Street, which ran to the east of the area from the first century. In medieval times, Hoxton formed a rural part of Shoreditch parish and was mostly divided into small landholdings. It achieved independent ecclesiastical status in 1826 with the founding of its own parish church dedicated to St John the Baptist, though civil jurisdiction was still invested in the Shoreditch vestry. The Worshipful Company of Haberdashers remains Patron of the advowson of the parish of St John's.

In 1415, the Lord Mayor of London "caused the wall of the City to be broken towards Moorfields, and built the postern called Moorgate, for the ease of the citizens to walk that way upon causeways towards Islington and Hoxton" – at that time, still marshy areas. The residents responded by harassing walkers to protect their fields. A century later, the hedges and ditches were destroyed, by order of the city, to enable city dwellers to partake in leisure at Hoxton.

=== Tudor Hoxton ===
By Tudor times many moated manor houses existed to provide ambassadors and courtiers country air nearby the city. This included many Catholics, attracted by the house of the Portuguese Ambassador, where, in his private chapel, a priest celebrated the masses forbidden in a Protestant country. One such resident was Sir Thomas Tresham, who was imprisoned here by Elizabeth I of England for harbouring Catholic priests. The open fields to the north and west were frequently used for archery practice, and on 22 September 1598 the playwright Ben Jonson fought a fatal duel in Hoxton Fields, killing actor Gabriel Spencer. Jonson was able to prove his literacy, thereby claiming benefit of clergy to escape a hanging.

Hoxton's public gardens were a popular resort from the overcrowded City streets, and it is reputed that the name of Pimlico came from the publican, Ben Pimlico, and his particular brew.

Have at thee, then, my merrie boyes, and beg for old Ben Pimlico's nut-brown ale.

The gardens appear to have been situated near Hoxton Street, known at that time, as Pimlico Path. The modern area of Pimlico derives its name from its former use in Hoxton.

=== Gunpowder, treason and a letter ===
On 26 October 1605 Hoxton achieved notoriety, when a letter arrived at the home of local resident William Parker, Lord Monteagle warning him not to attend the Parliament summoned by James I to convene on 5 November, that they received from a stranger on the road, because "yet I say they shall receive a terrible blow, the Parliament, and yet they shall not see who hurts them". The letter may have been sent by his brother-in-law Francis Tresham, or he may have written it himself, to curry favour. The letter was read aloud at supper, before prominent Catholics, and then he delivered it personally to Robert Cecil at Whitehall. While the conspirators were alerted, by the public reading, to the existence of the letter they persevered with their plot as their gunpowder remained undiscovered. Lord Monteagle accompanied Thomas Howard, the Lord Chamberlain, at his visit to the undercroft of Parliament, where Guy Fawkes was found in the early hours of 5 November. Most of the conspirators fled on the discovery of the Gunpowder Plot, but Francis Tresham was arrested a few days later at his house, also in Hoxton. A commemorative plaque is attached to modern flats at the site of Monteagle's house in Hoxton Street.

=== Almshouses and madhouses ===
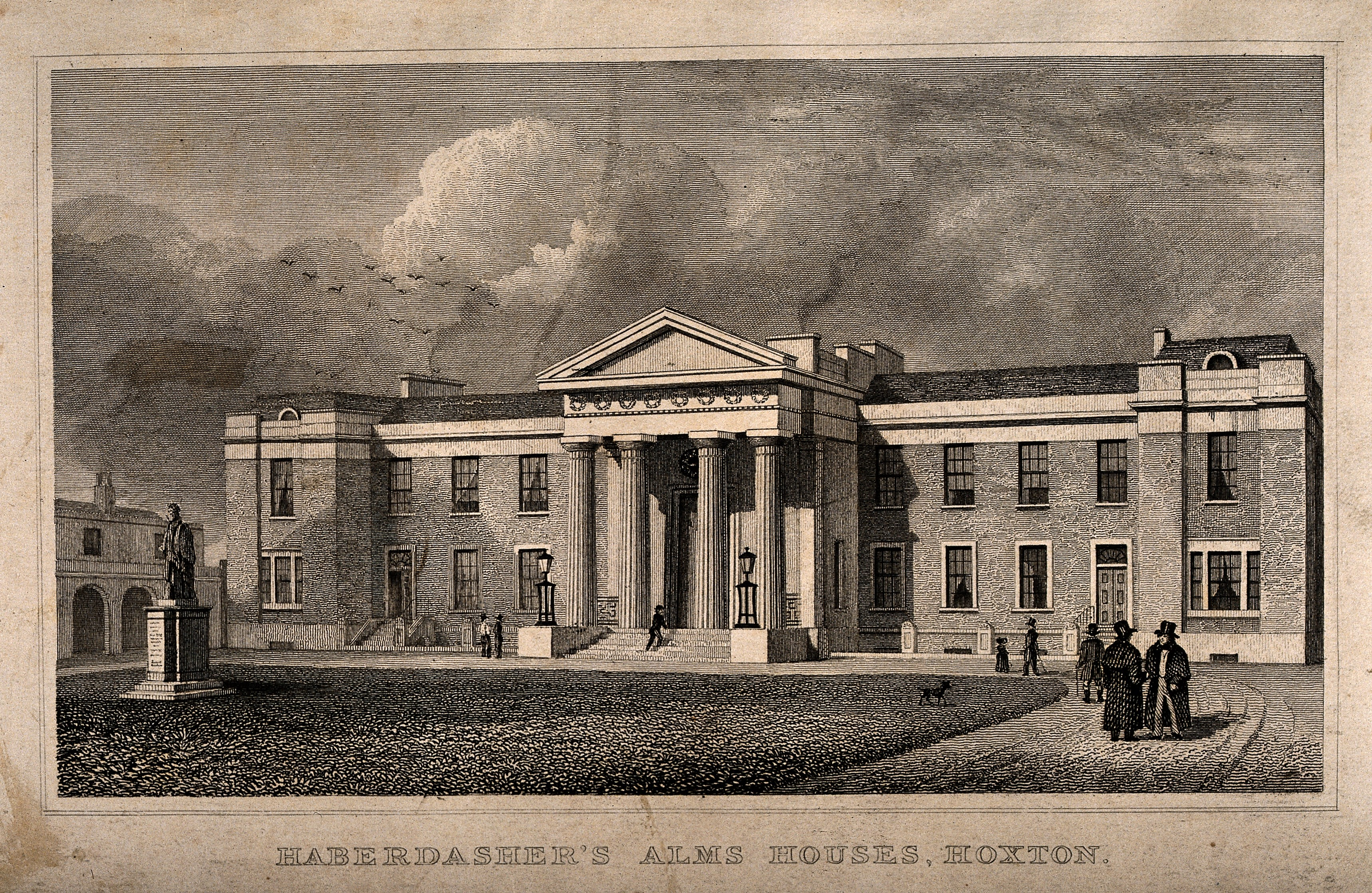
Haberdashers' Alms Houses, as rebuilt by D. R. Roper in 1825.

By the end of the 17th century the nobility's estates began to be broken up. Many of these large houses came to be used as schools, hospitals or mad houses, with almshouses being built on the land between by benefactors, most of whom were City liverymen. Aske's Almshouses were built (to Robert Hooke's design) on Pitfield Street in 1689 from Robert Aske's endowment for 20 poor haberdashers and a school for 20 children of freemen.

Almshouses endowed by Robert Geffrye were established by the Ironmongers' Company on the Kingsland Road in 1714. The almshouses closed in 1911, with the remaining pensioners moving to Kent and Hampshire. The LCC took on the almshouses and opened the Geffrye Museum in 1914 to house collections of furniture and wood crafts. Museum of the Home now occupies the site, and following an extensive refurbishment, is a free museum with access directly opposite Hoxton Station.

Hoxton House, was established as a private asylum in 1695. It was owned by the Miles family, and expanded rapidly into the surrounding streets being described by Coleridge as the Hoxton madhouse. Here fee-paying 'gentle and middle class' people took their exercise in the extensive grounds between Pitfield Street and Kingsland Road; including the poet Charles Lamb. Over 500 pauper lunatics resided in closed wards, and it remained the Naval Lunatic Asylum until 1818. The asylum closed in 1911; the only remains are by Hackney Community College, where a part of the house was incorporated into the school that replaced it in 1921.

In the late 17th Century, Hoxton Square and Charles Square were laid out, forming a popular area for residents. Non-conformist sects were attracted to the area, away from the restrictions of the City's regulations.

=== Victorian era and 20th century ===
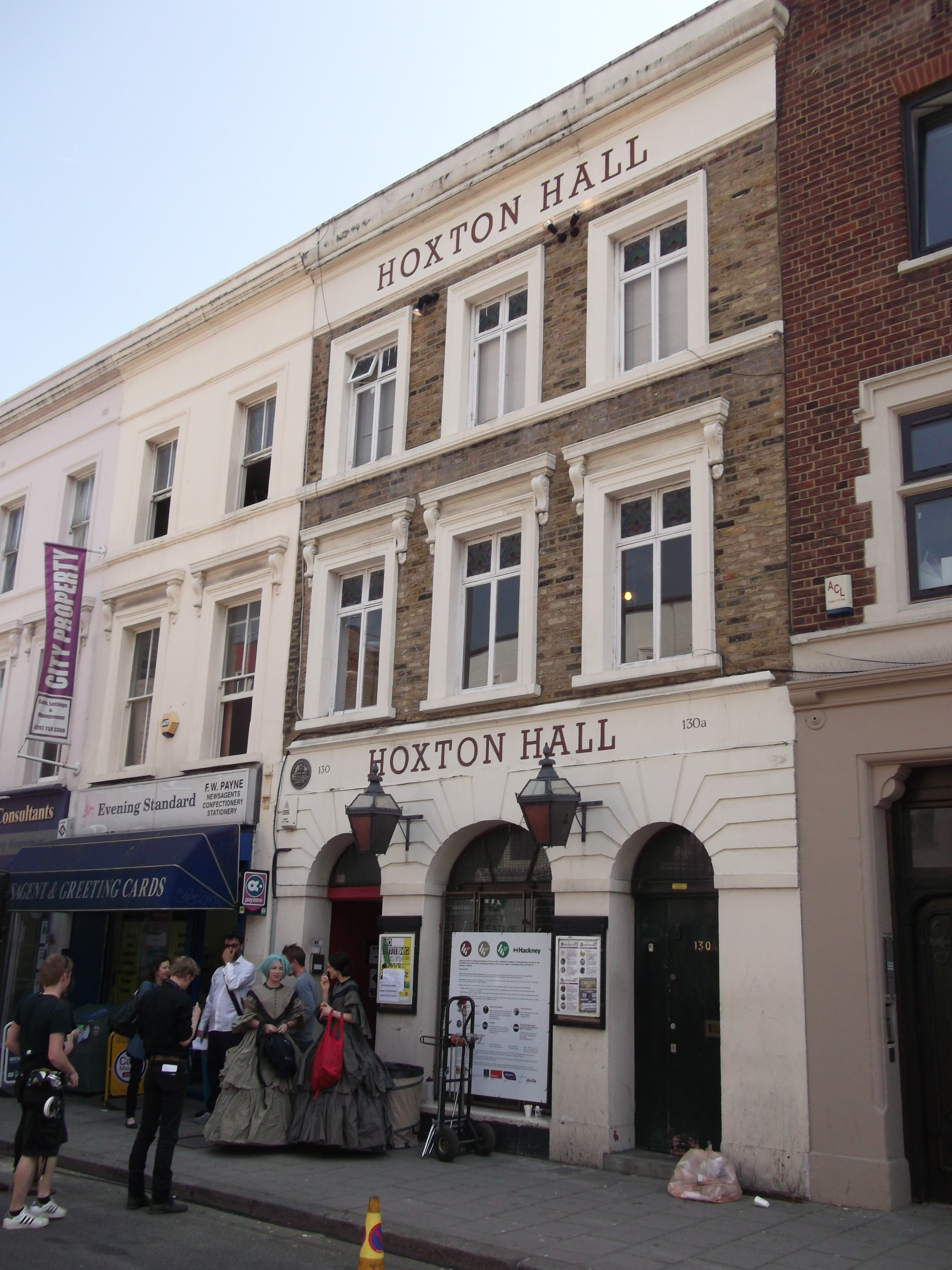
Hoxton Hall, still an active community resource

In the Victorian era the railways made travelling to distant suburbs easier, and this combined with infill building and industrialisation to drive away the wealthier classes, leaving Hoxton a concentration of the poor with many slums. The area became a centre for the furniture trade.

In the 1860s Hoxton Square became home to the Augustinian Priory, school and Church of St Monica (architect: E. W. Pugin) built 1864-66 and the first Augustinian House in England since the Reformation era.

Charles Booth in Life and Labour of the People in London of 1902 gave the following description:

The character of the whole locality is working-class. Poverty is everywhere, with a considerable admixture of the very poor and vicious ... Large numbers have been and are still being displaced by the encroachment of warehouses and factories ... Hoxton is known for its costers and Curtain criminals, for its furniture trade ... No servants are kept except in the main Road shopping streets and in a few remaining middle class squares in the west.

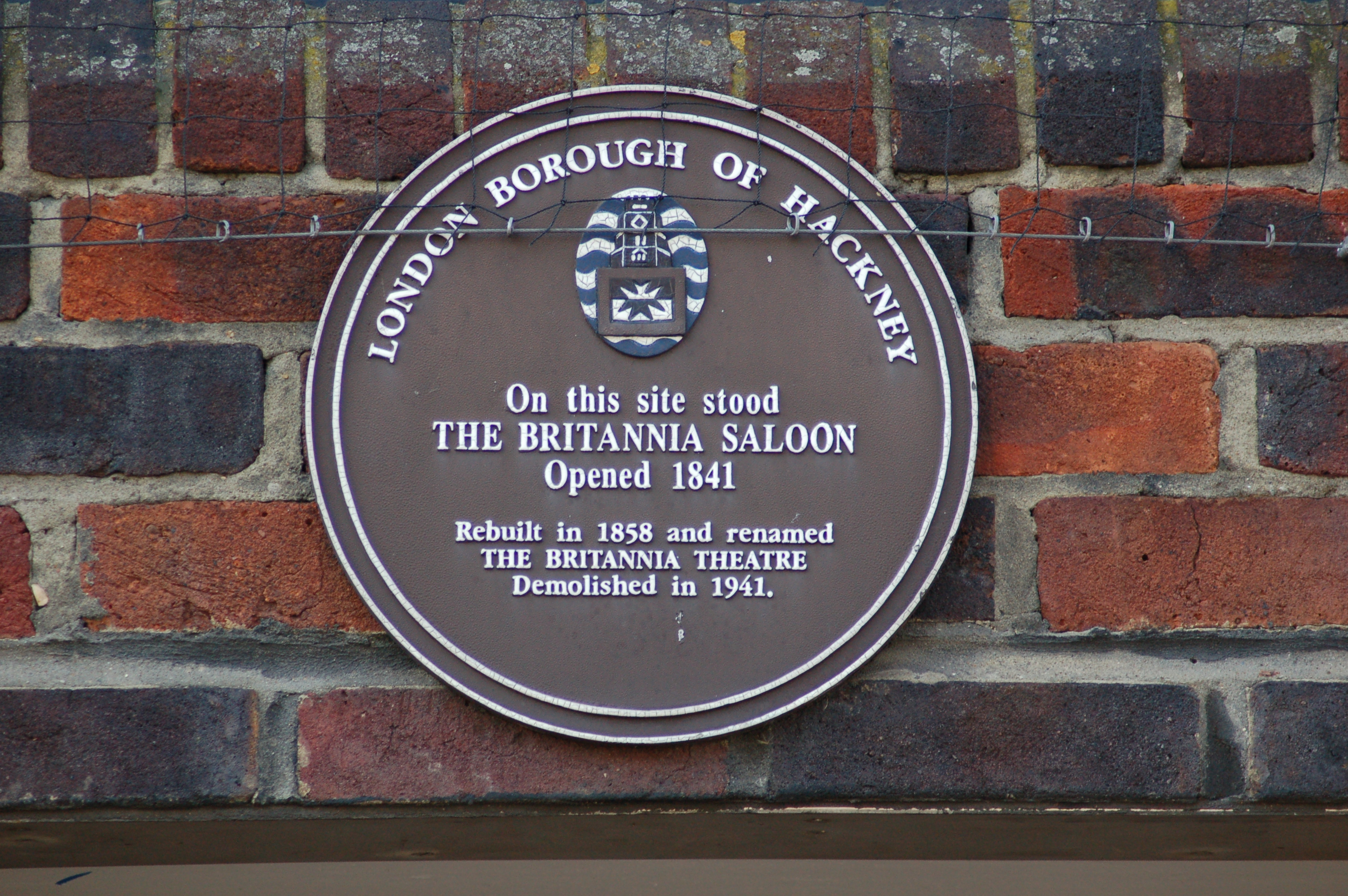
LBH plaque commemorating the Britannia Theatre, now attached to modern flats

In Hoxton Street, a plaque marks the location of the Britannia Theatre. This evolved from the former Pimlico tea gardens, a tavern and a saloon, into a 3,000-seat theatre, designed by Finch Hill. Together with the nearby Pollock's Toy Museum, it was destroyed in Second World War bombing. Hoxton Hall, also in Hoxton Street, which survives as a community centre, began life in 1863 as a "saloon style" music hall. It remains largely in its original form, as for many years it was used as a Quaker meeting house. There was also the 1870 Varieties Music Hall (by C. J. Phipps) in nearby Pitfield Street, this became a cinema in 1910, closing in 1941. In 2018 construction started on a refurbished cinema (operated by Curzon Cinemas) keeping the style of the original facade but expanding vertically to include residential properties. Planning permission for the refurbishment took a considerable time due to local opposition to the design. The cinema plans to open in 2019.

The National Centre for Circus Arts is based in the former vestry of St Leonard Shoreditch Electric Light Station, just to the north of Hoxton Market. Inside, the "Generating Chamber" and "Combustion Chamber" provide facilities for circus training and production. The building was constructed by the Vestry in 1895 to burn local rubbish and generate electricity. It also provided steam to heat the public baths. This replaced an earlier facility providing gas-light, located in Shoreditch.

Gainsborough Studios were located in a former power station, in Poole Street, by the Regents Canal. Alfred Hitchcock, Michael Balcon, Ivor Novello and Gracie Fields all worked at the studios, and films including The Lady Vanishes and The Wicked Lady were shot there. The studios operated there from 1924 to 1951, and were demolished in 2002, replaced by a modern apartment block, also named Gainsborough Studios.

The Stag's Head, Hoxton was built in 1936 for Truman's Brewery, and designed by their in-house architect A. E. Sewell.

With a new-found popularity, large parts of Hoxton have been gentrified. This has inevitably aroused hostility among some local residents, who believe they are being priced out of the area. Some parts of Hoxton, however, remain deprived, with council housing dominating the landscape.

== Hoxton today ==
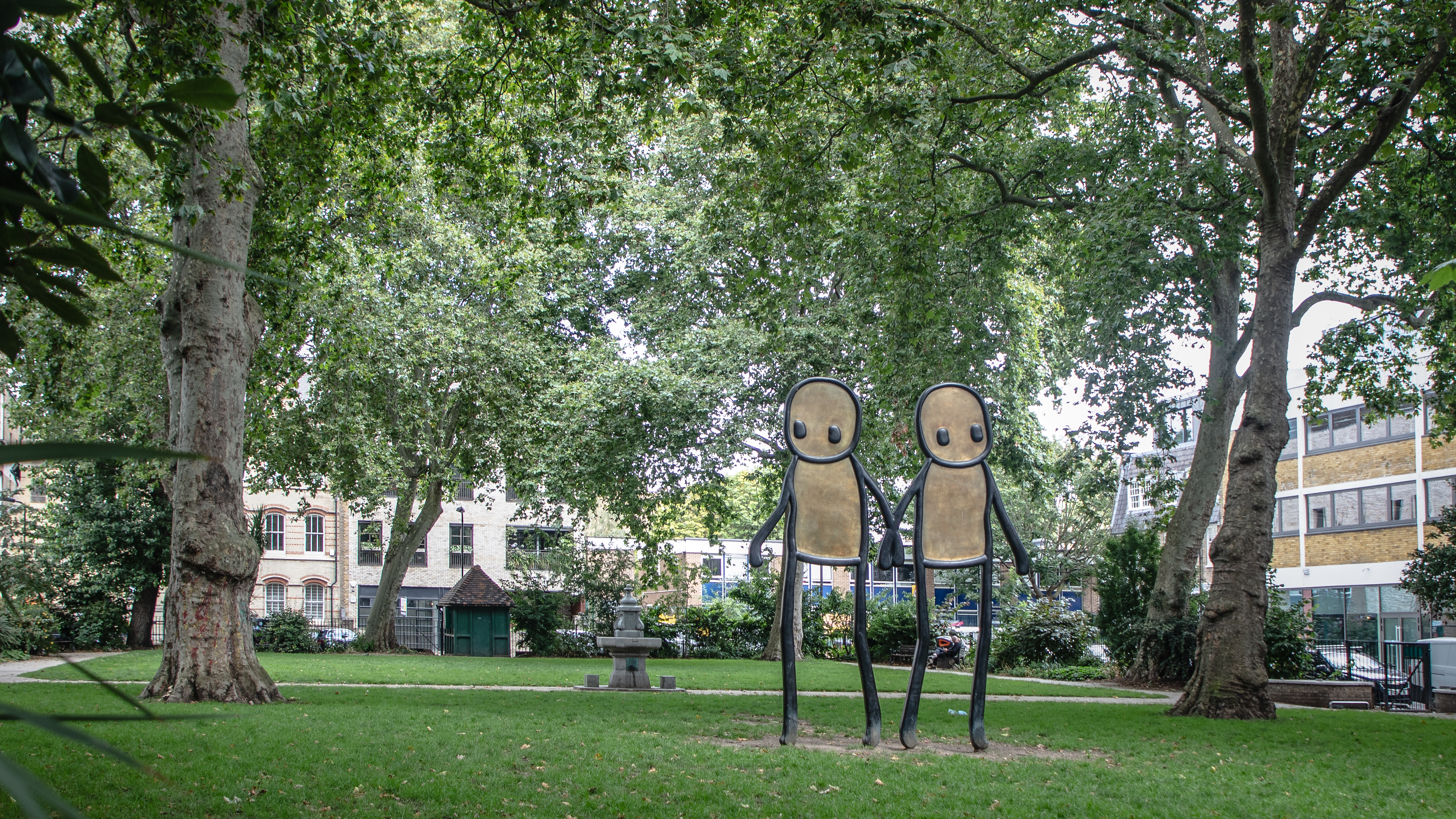
Holding Hands, a sculpture by Stik in Hoxton Square Park, pictured in 2021

The geographical distinction between Hoxton and Shoreditch is often confused. The two districts have a historical link as part of the same manor, and in the 19th century both formed part of the Metropolitan Borough of Shoreditch. This was incorporated into the newly created London Borough of Hackney in 1965, but old street signs bearing the name are still to be found throughout the area. Both are also considered to be part of the East End of London.

Manufacturing developments in the years after the Second World War meant that many of the small industries that characterised Hoxton moved out. By the early 1980s, these industrial lofts and buildings came to be occupied by young artists as inexpensive live/work spaces, while exhibitions, raves and clubs occupied former office and retail space at the beginning of the 1990s. During this time Joshua Compston established his Factual Nonsense gallery on Charlotte Road in Shoreditch and organised art fetes in Hoxton Square. Their presence gradually drew other creative industries into the area, especially magazines, design firms, and dot-coms.

By the end of the 20th century, the southern half of Hoxton had become a vibrant arts and entertainment district boasting a large number of bars, nightclubs, restaurants, and art galleries. In this period, the new Hoxton residents could be identified by their obscurely fashionable (or "ironically" unfashionable) clothes and their hair (the so-called "Hoxton Fin", as exemplified by Fran Healy of Travis). The excesses and fashion-centricity of Hoxton and Shoreditch denizens have been satirised in the satirical magazine Shoreditch Twat, on the TVGoHome website, and in the sitcom Nathan Barley. This fashionable area centres around Hoxton Square, a small park bordered mainly by former industrial buildings, as well as the elegant 19th century parish church of St John's.

The northern half of the district is more residential and contains many council housing estates and new-build private residences. Residents are typically older and the unemployment and crime rates, with the exceptions of drug offences, robbery and theft, are relatively high compared to some parts of the borough. Hoxton Street Market is the focal point of this end of the district. The market sells a wide range of household goods during the week and specialises in independent fashion, art and design products on Saturdays. Nearby is the Museum of the Home and Hoxton War Memorial.

The Hoxton Trust was established in 1983 and exists to make the area of Hoxton and Shoreditch a better place for everyone who lives or works there. The award-winning community garden is a private space for the benefit of everyone who lives and works in the area. It is maintained by volunteers and a community gardener, and is not a council-run park.

Property prices have continued to rise steeply since the early years of the 21st century as property developers have moved to cash in on the area's trendy image, central location and transport links. Some galleries have, as a result, moved to nearby Shoreditch, or have relocated further afield to cheaper districts such as London Fields or Bethnal Green. In response, the local council formed a not-for-profit corporation, Shoreditch Our Way (now called The Shoreditch Trust), to buy local buildings and lease them out as community facilities and housing. The extension of the East London Line (completed in 2010), has provided the local rail access which was lost when the line from Broad Street closed to services.

The Hoxton electoral ward returns three councillors to Hackney London Borough Council. The area forms part of the Hackney South and Shoreditch parliamentary constituency.

=== Hoxton Market ===
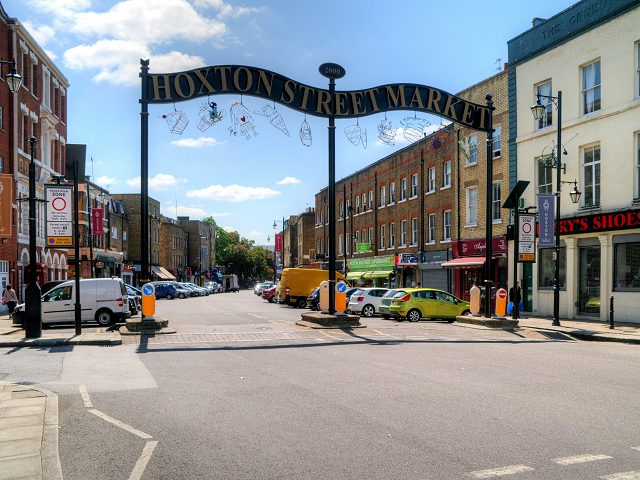
Hoxton Street Market sign, 2015

Hoxton Market, which is now in Hoxton Street rather than at its original site to the west of Hoxton Square, was founded in 1687. This market was the cornerstone of the local community, but in the 1980s began to lose trade.

In 2013 the local business community, working with the council, started work to revive the market. This attracted local attention and increased trade, and was complemented by new shops opening along the length of the market.

The Saturday market sells clothing, street food and various homewares, and includes reduced access for vehicles.

A traditional pie and mash shop can still be found on Hoxton Street.

== Transport ==
Hoxton is a National Rail station on the Windrush line of the London Overground network. In the southwest of the district, the nearest London Underground station is Old Street on the Northern line. The station is also a stop on National Rail's Northern City Line, operated by Greater Thameslink Railway.

== People ==
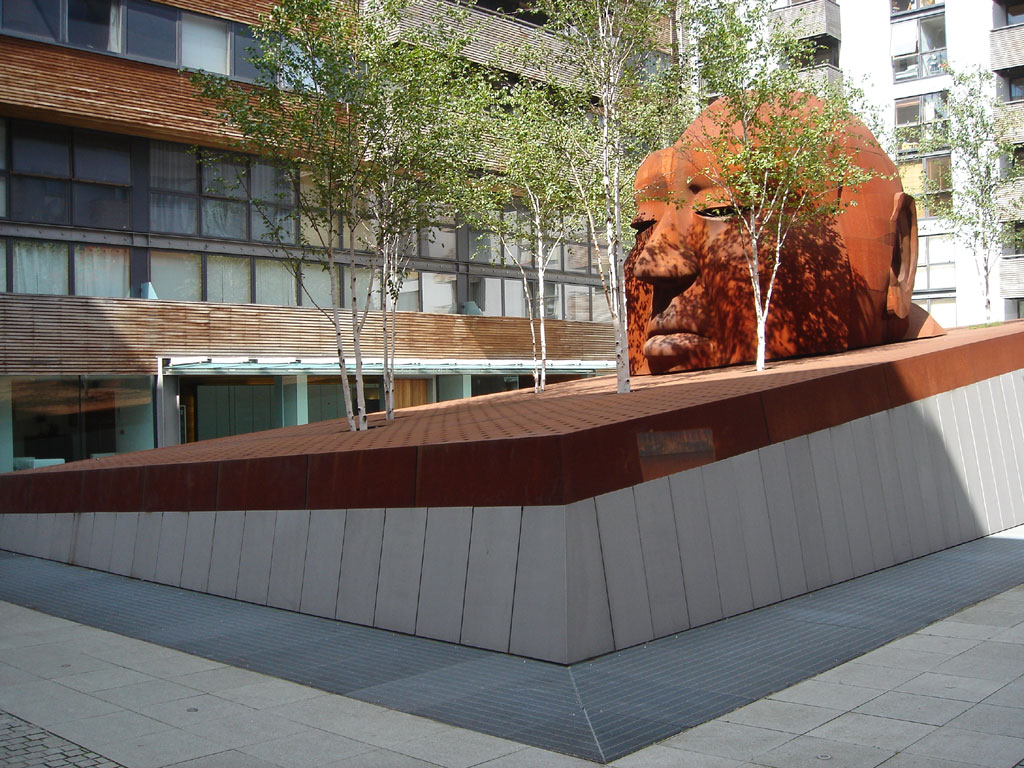
Sir Alfred Hitchcock sculpture at the site of Gainsborough Pictures, Poole Street, Hoxton.

- Charles Bradlaugh, founder of the National Secular Society in 1866, was born in Hoxton.
- Frank Chapple, union leader, was born and raised in Hoxton. He was ennobled as Lord Chapple of Hoxton in 1985.
- Harold Cole, soldier and traitor in World War II France, grew up in Hoxton.
- Peter Dean, who played Pete Beale in EastEnders from 1985 to 1993, was born in Hoxton in 1939.
- Jason Donovan, actor and singer, lived in Hoxton whilst appearing in numerous West End shows.
- Sir Alfred Hitchcock began his career at the Gainsborough Studios.
- Reggie and Ronnie Kray – East End gangsters born in Stean Street, Hoxton (Haggerston) (1933)
- Bryan Magee, philosopher and politician, born in Hoxton in 1930
- Marie Lloyd – music hall star, was born Matilda Alice Victoria Wood here on 12 February 1870, the eldest of nine children. She and her sisters longed to go on the stage, and haunted the local Royal Eagle Tavern music hall, on City Road (where their father also worked, as a waiter). Seven of her siblings went on to professional stage careers, adopting the surname Lloyd, apart from Daisy, who had a successful career as Daisy Wood.
- Hoxton Tom McCourt, influential in the late 1970s and early 1980s mod and oi/punk scenes and founder of the band, the 4-Skins
- Lenny McLean, actor, bouncer, bare-knuckle boxer was born here
- Jamie Oliver opened the original Fifteen restaurant in Hoxton in 2002
- James Parkinson, physician and researcher on Parkinson's disease, was a resident of Hoxton Square
- Jason Pierce, of the band Spacemen 3 and Spiritualized lives in Hoxton.
- Abraham Rees, editor and Unitarian minister, was a tutor at Hoxton Academy
- George Sewell, TV actor was born in Hoxton.
- Mary Wollstonecraft, social reformer, writer and mother of Mary Shelley, was born and spent her early years here.
