= Innovations (retailer) =

Defunct British mail order retailer of gadgets

- Type: Mail order, online retail
- Industry: Consumer electronics
- Founded: 1985; 41 years ago
- Founder: Nigel Swaby
- Defunct: 2003
- Headquarters: London, UK
- Key people: Robin Klein (chairman and CEO)
- Products: Gadgets and gizmos
- Owner: Shop Direct
- Number of employees: 30
- Website: Official website at the Wayback Machine (archived 22 August 2001)

Innovations was a mail order and online retail business in the UK which operated from 1985–2003, selling novel consumer electronics and gadgets under the slogan "Tomorrow's Products Today". The company's Innovations catalogue, titled in its early years The Innovations Report and Innovations: The Report, was distributed with the weekend colour supplements of British national newspapers. In 1996 the company became the UK's first online retailer. Even though the catalogue was frequently subject to public and media ridicule for the absurd nature of many of the products, it was still responsible for commercialising some ultimately successful devices, including Dyson's first vacuum cleaner.

From 1990 until the ceasing of its operations the catalogue's product descriptions were the work of a single copywriter, Nick Biggs, who ultimately described over 5,000 products for it.

== History ==
Innovations was founded in 1985 by Nigel Swaby, an entrepreneur. In 1991 Robin Klein, a South African businessman resident in the UK, became its chairman and CEO. Three years later, his son Saul, while working at the Daily Telegraph to launch its online presence, observed to his father that the World Wide Web would become "the printing press of the 21st century", and predicted that Innovations would have online sales. In May of the following year Innovations began online retail operations, conducting the first documented e-commerce transaction in the UK and reaching a run rate of £80,000 per month by a year later.

Logo of the Innovations website in 1996

Example of a typically outlandish gadget sold by the company

Cover of the final Innovations catalogue

In 1987 John Hoerner, an American businessman, was recruited to run the Debenhams department store chain in the UK, becoming CEO of the Burton Group of retailers in 1991. In 1996 he wanted to emulate the success of the Next Directory home shopping catalogue, and on the advice of management consultants purchased Innovations from Klein for £44.9m. The purchase brought in Innovations' novel business techniques, such as having data scientists on their staff, and pioneering drop shipping via the use of an electronic data interchange (EDI) system which sent shipping labels directly to stock suppliers. In 1997 Burton sold Innovations and most of the remainder of its catalogue business to the retailer Great Universal Stores (GUS) for £20m, retaining Innovations' customer database.

GUS announced in April 2003 that the Innovations business was under-performing against competition in the mail-order market and that its spring-summer edition would be the final catalogue. The company's office in Wembley, north London was closed with the loss of around 30 jobs. Later in the year GUS sold off its home shopping unit, which had been renamed to ARG Equation the year before, to David and Frederick Barclay's retail company March U.K., which renamed it to Shop Direct. In October 2003, Shop Direct announced that they would be relaunching the Innovations brand.

== Media coverage ==
In 2000, satirist Charlie Brooker created a web parody of the catalogue called Unnovations, with the slogan "Tomorrow's Outdated Products Today". The site was used as the basis of a television series of the same name in 2001.

In 2005 the British consumer rights charity and magazine Which? published a report on false advertising, awarding the title of most outlandish claim to GUS, for an Innovations Catalogue item of lightbulbs said to produce "healthier light".

== See also ==
- The Discovery Store, defunct retailer of novelties and gadgets in the UK (1991–2016)
- The Gadget Shop, defunct retailer of novelties and gadgets in the UK (1991–2005)
- Sharper Image, retailer of novelties and gadgets in the US

== Citations ==
- "Cult gadget magazine folds". BBC News. 17 April 2003.
- "Innovations rises from ashes". BBC News. 27 October 2003.
- Biggs, Nick (2004). The Very Best of the Innovations Catalogue. Bloomsbury Publishing. ISBN 0-7475-7346-8.
- "Shop Direct Group". Companies House. 25 October 2002.
- "ARG Equation Limited/March U.K. Limited". Competition and Consumer Protection Commission. Ireland. 18 June 2003.
- McCartney, Jenny (20 April 2003). "Goodbye Innovations, life just won't be the same without you!". The Daily Telegraph.
- "The investors' view: Robin Klein". Growing Business. 15 January 2010. Archived from the original on 9 May 2012.
- Wainwright, Martin (18 April 2003). "At last - an end to all those handy pocket-sized Innovations catalogues". The Guardian.
- King, Brian (2006). "Lies for sale". The Lying Ape: An Honest Guide to a World of Deception. Icon Books. p. 60.
- "Innovations runs out of steam". Manchester Evening News. 2003.
- Benigson, Moira (26 April 2019). "Robin Klein: A millennial over 70". MBS Group.
- Pederson, Jay P., ed. (1999). "Arcadia Group PLC". International Directory of Company Histories. Vol. 1999: Vol 28. St. James Press. p. 30. ISBN 1-55862-387-6.
- Chandiramani, Ravi (31 October 2003). "Shop Direct picks 3MC to resurrect Innovations brand". PR Week.
- "UK's Burton Joins Web Brigade". Women's Wear Daily. UK. 6 December 1996. p. 12.
