= Dial-a-Phone =

UK phone retailer

DialaPhone
- Industry: Telecommunications
- Founded: 1995
- Founder: Jonathan Beck and Richard Frank
- Defunct: 15 September 2014
- Fate: Defunct (bankrupt)
- Headquarters: Newcastle-under-Lyme, Staffordshire, England
- Products: Mobile telephones
- Parent: Phones4u
- Website: Archived website at the Wayback Machine (archived 4 September 2014)

Dialaphone (Dial-A-Phone, Dial A Phone) was an independent mobile phone retailer in the United Kingdom. It was established in February 1995 as a direct marketer and supplier of mobile phones and mobile phone accessories. The e-commerce website went online in September 2000. In 2008 it was acquired by Phones 4u who as of September 2014 collapsed into administration closing branches, online trading and call centres.

== History ==
Dialaphone was founded in February 1995 by Jonathan Beck and Richard Frank with capital borrowed from Beck's father. While there was enough investment to fund telephone lines and recording equipment, the company had to carry out transactions without tracking software. Instead, Beck organised a system of trays and runners to keep track of orders during the company's early days.

Initially, the business model relied entirely on direct phone calls generated from advertisements placed in the press, combined with efficient processing. Double page spreads in tabloids attracted consumers.

During the late 1990s Dialaphone experienced rapid growth in a burgeoning market. This, along with the business’ minimal running costs, attracted the attentions of several investors. In 1999, a deal was made with Barclays Private Equity to take a majority share in the company in return for investment. This investment enabled the business to expand into the online area and develop a new website called www.dialaphone.co.uk.

In May 1998, Dialaphone began its transition into an online business model with the launch of a dedicated e-commerce website. The website would soon become the business’ primary source of income.

After extensive growth and moving to new premises the management teams were restructured and in the summer of 1999 a new Marketing Director, Finance Director and Managing Director were appointed.

Andy Brown, who had formerly worked under John Caudwell at Phones 4u, was brought on board as Managing Director and began pursuing other avenues of marketing, using scratchcards, catalogues and TV advertising. Dialaphone became more involved in sponsorship and was the primary shirt sponsor of Middlesbrough Football Club from 2002 to 2004. In 2011, Dialaphone became the Official Mobile Partner of Premier League Darts, sponsored the Rugby League Challenge Cup and in 2012 was set to become the Official Online Mobile Phone Sponsor of the Football League.

Dialaphone became the third largest contract connector in the UK. After seven years, Andy Brown parted company with Frank and Beck in April 2006 following differences over the future direction of the business. The company had reportedly made a turnover of £195m during the past year and was one of the largest online mobile phone retailers in the country.

Despite its early success Dialaphone's contract volume dwindled, and it was bought by one-time competitor Phones 4u for a knockdown price in February 2008. The fee was reported to be around £9m.

On 14 September 2014, the Dial-A-Phone website was taken offline following the parent company, Phones 4u going into administration.

== Products ==
Dialaphone's products included feature phones and smartphones from all the major manufacturers, which were available on the UK's main networks. Dialaphone offered customers a range of free gifts, usually personal electronic goods, and cashback with certain tariffs and handsets.

== Environment ==
Dialaphone was partnered with mobile recycling service Money4URMobile which offers incentives for customers to recycle their old mobile phone.

== See also ==
- Phones 4u
- John Caudwell
- Mobile phone
