= Concretene =

Graphene-enriched concrete

Concretene is graphene-enriched concrete.

== Properties ==
Graphene acts as a mechanical support, increasing strength by around 30%, and offers an extra catalyst surface for the chemical reactions that produce concrete. It improves bonding at the microscopic scale. The increased strength allows much less material to be used, reducing carbon footprint (8% of 2021 carbon emissions) and energy costs, although material costs are some 5% higher, producing a net 20% cost reduction.

The graphene is added where the concrete is mixed, without affecting installation at the construction site. It can be used to replace sand in concrete.

== History ==
In 2019, GrapheneCA announced the availability of concrete-suitable graphene.

The first use of concretene came in 2021, when it was used in the construction of a gym in Amesbury, United Kingdom.

NERD, developer of concretene, announced partnerships with Arup Group and Black Swan Graphene in March 2023. Arup took a 4.2% equity stake to support global roll-out.

In October 2024, concretene raised €3.5 million in a funding round led by Molten Ventures with participation from LocalGlobe to commercialize its graphene-enhanced concrete admixture and support product certification and market roll-out.

== See also ==
- Concrete cover
