= Cold Storage (film) =

2026 comedy horror film

- Theatrical release poster
- Directed by: Jonny Campbell
- Screenplay by: David Koepp
- Based on: Cold Storage by David Koepp
- Produced by: Gavin Polone; David Koepp
- Starring: Georgina Campbell; Joe Keery; Sosie Bacon; Vanessa Redgrave; Lesley Manville; Liam Neeson
- Cinematography: Tony Slater Ling
- Edited by: Billy Sneddon
- Music by: Mathieu Lamboley
- Production companies: StudioCanal; Pariah
- Distributed by: StudioCanal (France); Samuel Goldwyn Films (United States)
- Release dates: January 29, 2026 (Argentina, Mexico and Brazil); February 13, 2026 (United States); February 18, 2026 (France)
- Running time: 99 minutes
- Countries: France; United States
- Language: English
- Box office: $4.1 million

Cold Storage is a 2026 science fiction horror comedy film directed by Jonny Campbell from a screenplay by David Koepp based on his 2019 novel of the same name. It stars Georgina Campbell, Joe Keery, and Liam Neeson and follows the attempts at containing a parasitic fungus that leaks out of an abandoned military base.

Cold Storage is a co-production between the United States and France. It was first released in Mexico and Brazil on January 29, 2026. It was later released in the United States by Samuel Goldwyn Films on February 13, and in France by StudioCanal on February 18, 2026. The film received generally positive reviews from critics.

== Plot ==
In 1979, space station Skylab is decommissioned through atmospheric reentry, but an oxygen tank survives and lands in Western Australia. A farmer takes it and makes a makeshift Skylab museum around it.

In 2007, biochemist Dr. Hero Martins accompanies Pentagon bioterror operatives Robert Quinn and Trini Romano to the tank. It had been sent into space carrying an infectious fungus for study, and days before the three arrived, a heavily mutated fungus escaped the tank when the farmer attempted to clean it, infecting and killing him and many men in the surrounding area. Hero takes a sample of the fungus before a patch that she stepped on corrodes the boots of her hazmat suit, burns through, and infects her to control her actions. In a moment of lucidity, Hero commits suicide in front of Robert and Trini. The military incinerate the farm and the corpses, while the sample is taken to an underground cold storage vault at the Atchison Storage Facility in Kansas.

In the intervening years, the government has sealed the vault and rented the ground level section to a self storage company. In the present day, elderly client Ma Rooney enters her storage unit intent on committing suicide in a vault with her deceased husband's belongings, and night guards Travis Meacham and Naomi Williams start hearing a beeping alarm and try to discover its source. It turns out to be an alert for a malfunction in the vault's systems caused by a rise in temperatures, prompting Robert to be contacted in his Raleigh, North Carolina home by a military officer who, when asked for a name, nicknames herself "Abigail". Robert is only given minimal support by official military channels, but convinces Abigail of the dangers brought by the fungus. She continues to use her personal phone to get him equipment and remain in contact throughout the mission. Abigail arranges for Trini to meet Robert in Kansas, stopping first to pick up a device from her son's basement, before dropping him off at the site.

Travis and Naomi head towards the sealed vault, where an infected rat king is outside the door separating them from a rapidly growing fungus trying to break out. Outside, Naomi's ex-boyfriend, Mike, arrives in his car to get her help after accidentally shooting his parent's cat. A cockroach that was infected in the vault gets outside and enters the trunk, reanimating the dead cat. When Mike lets the cat out, it kills itself by impaling its head on an antenna, spreading remains that infect both Mike and two deer. Returning to the ground level, Travis and Naomi see that Mike and one of the deer have entered. Seeking to infect them with the fungus, the deer explodes and Mike chases them. The duo hide in one of the storage units and call the military. Abigail redirects them to Robert, who tells them that he is arriving and advises them to remain hidden.

However, their manager, Griffin, arrives with a biker gang to take smuggled televisions from storage. Travis and Naomi leave their hiding spot wanting to warn them to flee, but Mike infects most of the gang members as Griffin runs away. Before he can get to the duo, Ma Rooney comes out of her storage unit and shoots him dead. Ma Rooney escapes the area while Naomi and Travis find Robert outside, who gives them a backpack nuke to be put outside the vault door and destroy the whole facility from within and eliminate any trace of the fungus. As the duo place the bomb (killing one of the infected along the way), Robert kills an escaping infected, but hurts his back and is unable to get up. Griffin goes outside and tries to steal Robert's car keys when an arriving Trini kills him. Travis and Naomi come back out and help Robert into Trini's car, driving away right as the bomb explodes.

Days later, Travis spends time with Naomi and her daughter, while Robert recovers in the hospital. He watches news reports praising him for preventing the outbreak, while condemning the military for obstructing his aid. A visiting Abigail, whose real name is Ishani, admits she leaked Robert's reports on the fungus to the press. Meanwhile, the other infected deer vomits up the fungus in a forest.

== Cast ==
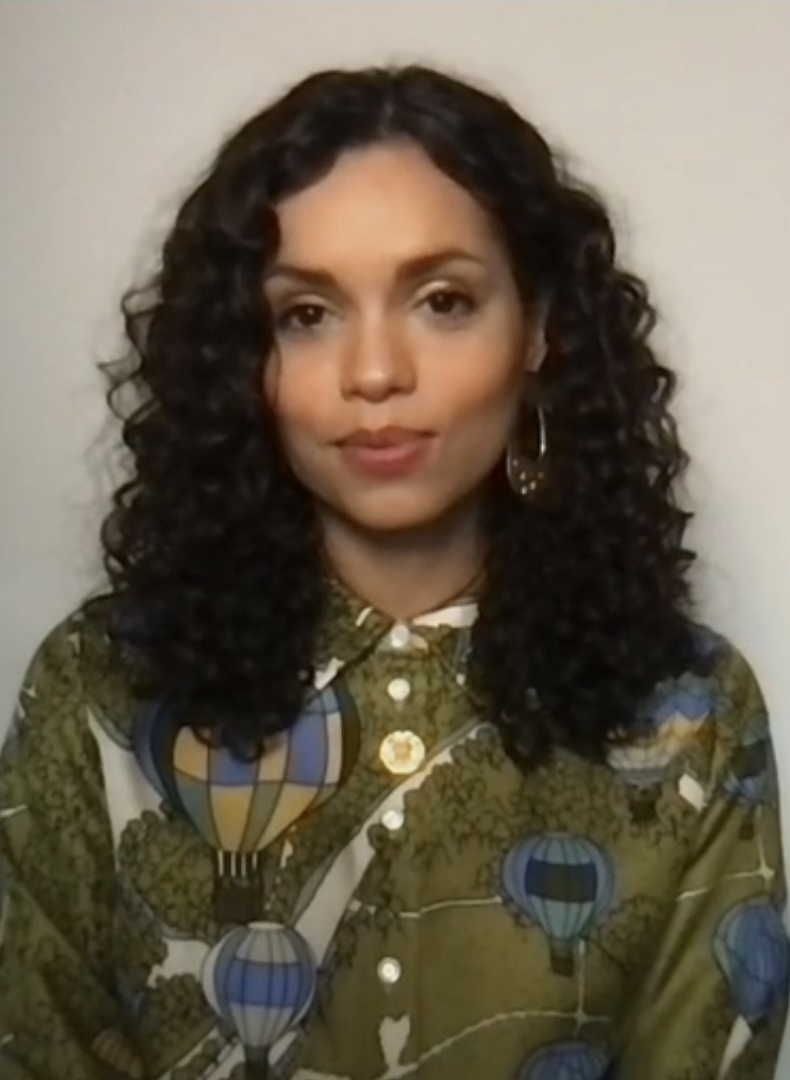
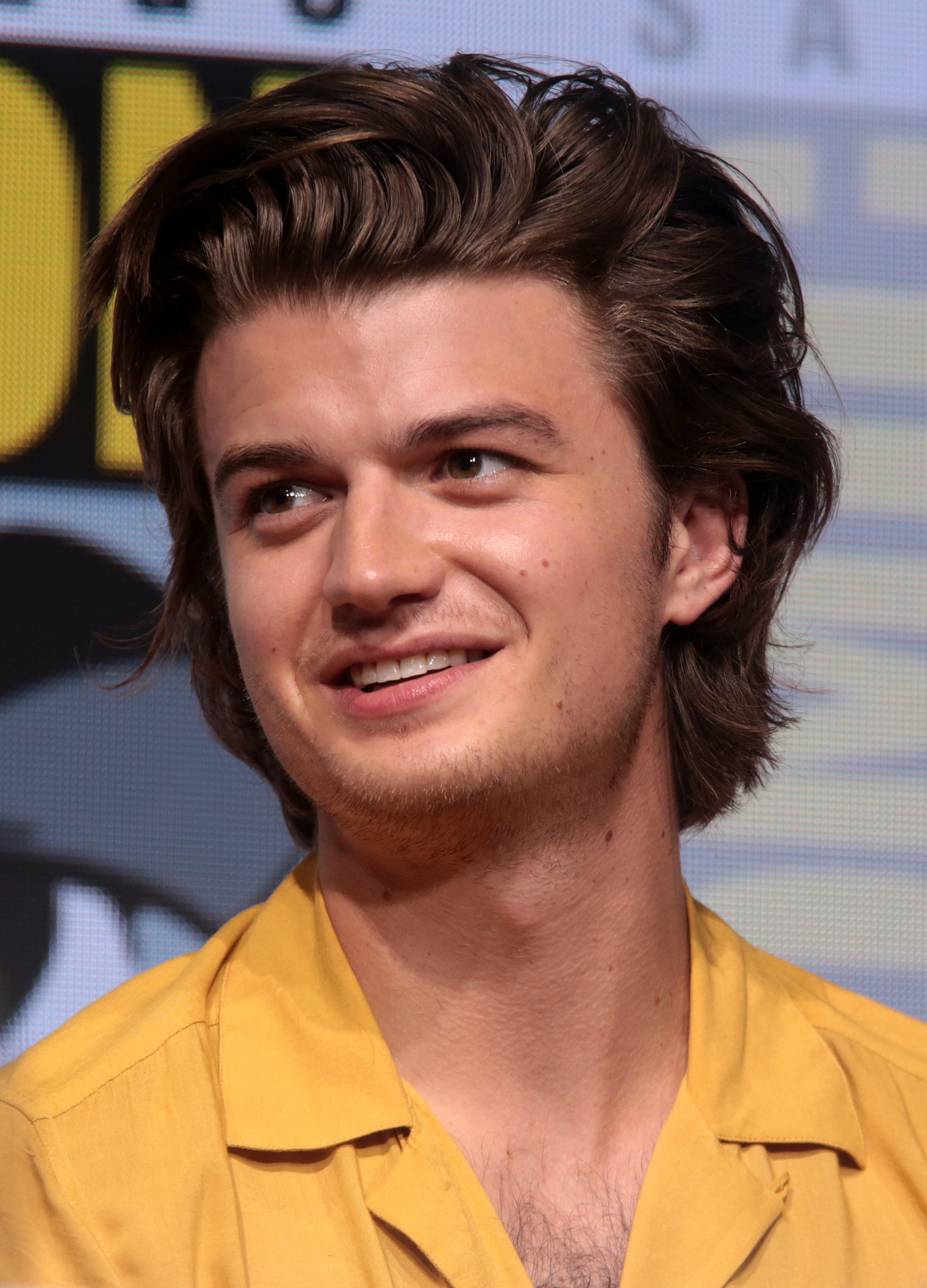
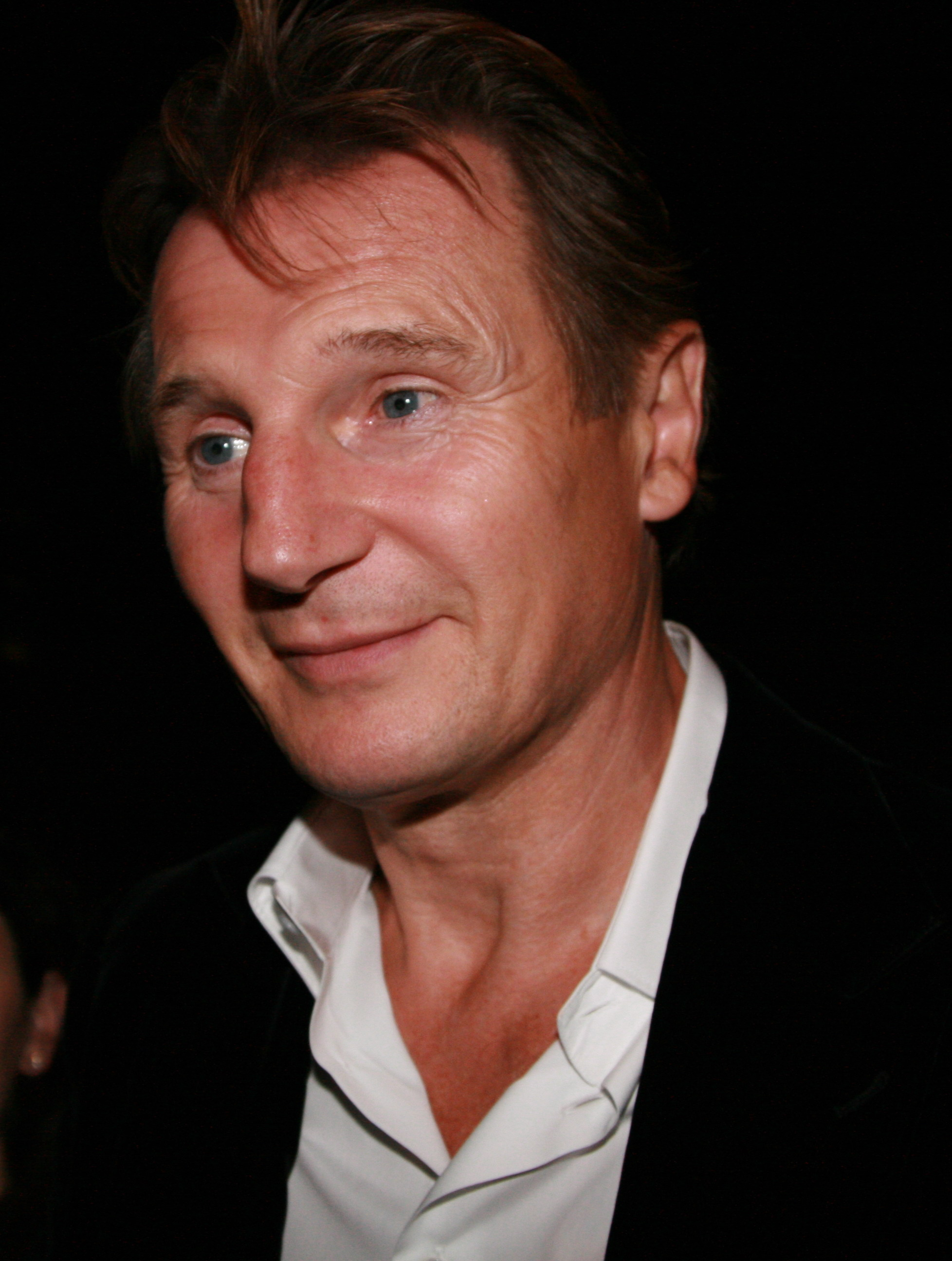
The film stars Georgina Campbell, Joe Keery, and Liam Neeson.
- Georgina Campbell as Naomi Williams
- Joe Keery as Travis "Teacake" Meacham
- Sosie Bacon as Dr. Hero Martins
- Vanessa Redgrave as Ma Rooney
- Lesley Manville as Trini Romano
- Liam Neeson as Robert Quinn
- Darrell D'Silva as The Rev
- Daniel Rigby as Anthony
- Rob Collins as Enos Minjarra
- Ellora Torchia as Abigail / Ishani
- Andrew Brooke as Greg
- Richard Brake as Jerabek
- Aaron Heffernan as Mike
- Gavin Spokes as Griffin

== Production ==
In May 2022, it was announced that Liam Neeson and Joe Keery would star in the film and that StudioCanal would fully finance the film. In October 2022, it was announced that Georgina Campbell joined the cast. In March 2023, it was announced that Sosie Bacon was added to the cast and that filming began in Italy and Morocco. The film is a co-production between the United States and France. It was announced in 2025 that Mathieu Lamboley would score the film.

== Release ==
In April 2025, Samuel Goldwyn Films acquired North American rights to the film. Cold Storage was first released in Mexico and Brazil on January 29, 2026, and then in the United States on February 13, 2026 in IMAX formats. StudioCanal released Cold Storage in Poland on February 6, in France on February 18, in Germany on February 19, in the United Kingdom on February 20, and in New Zealand on March 12.

== Reception ==
Metacritic review breakdown

Positive
8 (67%)
Mixed
4 (33%)
Negative
0 (0%)

On the review aggregator website Rotten Tomatoes, 81% of 105 critics' reviews are positive, with an average rating of 6.4/10. The website's consensus reads: "A smart but familiar B-movie throwback, Cold Storage delivers campy performances, gooey splatter, and wry sci-fi wit with infectious enthuasiasm." Metacritic, which uses a weighted average, assigned the film a score of 64 out of 100, based on 12 critics, indicating "generally favorable" reviews.

Brazilian critic Isabela Boscov praised the film, saying it exceeded her expectations: "Few things give me so much joy as a B-movie with an authentic B soul". David Rooney of The Hollywood Reporter commented: "To its credit, this is a movie that knows better than to take itself too seriously. It’s painless enough though could have been more than that with a thorough script polish." Michael Gingold of Rue Morgue wrote: "I’ve seen The Return of the Living Dead, and you, Cold Storage, are no Return of the Living Dead."
