= Unnovations =

- Genre: Comedy
- Starring: Chrissie Cotterill; Mark Powley; Alison Senior
- Voices of: Daniel Maier
- Country of origin: United Kingdom
- Original language: English
- No. of seasons: 1
- No. of episodes: 10

Production
- Running time: 30 mins
- Production company: Zeppotron

Original release
- Network: Play UK
- Release: 1 November 2001 – 1 September 2002

"Unnovations" is a TV series that ran on the now defunct satellite/cable channel Play UK in 2001. The series came from the makers of TVGoHome, Zeppotron. Unnovations started life in a similar format, as a Web-based satire of the Innovations Catalogue, written by Charlie Brooker. Since the demise of Play UK in 2002, the TV series has never been repeated.

It sharply parodied the world of shopping TV in its ten episodes, including demonstrations of hilarious and off the wall products. An example is the Snooze-a-nator, a device which gave you 8 hours sleep in 15 seconds; the Mortgage Vest which was just a plain vest which would take as long as a real mortgage to pay off so that customers could have all the fun of owing a real mortgage, and the Alibizer which was a book the size of a telephone directory which included alibis for every possible situation

Regular features in each show were

- Buyer Beware - A dangerous item from a rival shopping channel was slandered as was the rival channel.
- Shopper Of The Month - A different dysfunctional viewer is awarded the shopper of the month trophy
- readers letter - in every episode the presenter reads letters.
- Satisfied Customer - testimonials from supposed happy customers of Unnovations who never actually mention the names of the products they've bought.
- The Celebrity Hour - A relatively unfamous celebrity announces a different useless or insignificant product that he will be hawking.
- The Telly People Council - An announcement from the regulator was read out on each show citing something Unnovations had done to break the broadcasting rules.

There have been such characters as Frank, who watches Unnovations at home after being dismissed from a brewery and Sheena who has started to watch Unnovations after being released at the end of her 8-year prison sentence for Malicious Wounding.
