= Daniel Maier =

British comedy writer and performer

Daniel Maier (born 1968, in Newcastle upon Tyne, England) is a comedy writer and performer for television, radio, print and the stage. He was educated at the Royal Grammar School of Newcastle upon Tyne. Between 2002 and 2012, he was part of the writing team for ITV's BAFTA Television Award-winning Harry Hill's TV Burp. In 2010, he wrote two episodes of ITV1 soap opera Emmerdale. He has collaborated with Charlie Brooker, writing on the shows You Have Been Watching, How TV Ruined Your Life and Blackmere, and co-writing the comedy series A Touch of Cloth with Brooker for Sky 1. In 2011, Channel 4 produced a pilot of The Function Room, a sitcom written by Maier, as part of its Comedy Showcase strand. Other television credits include Al Murray’s Personality Disorder, The Peter Serafinowicz Show, BAFTA-winning The Sketch Show and Alistair McGowan's Big Impression.

In the 2010s, Maier was a contributor to The Guardian, writing about television and as an occasional World of Lather columnist.

Maier is the author of the one-act play The Unattended, performed at the 2006 Edinburgh Festival Fringe; Trapped, a series of half-hour dramas broadcast on BBC Radio 4, co-written with his brother, the stand-up comedian Mark Maier, and the radio play The Not Knowing, for which he was nominated for a Writers’ Guild Award. He has written and performed a show on Victorian polymath Francis Galton and a paper he wrote on the subject has been published in the academic journal Significance. His first book, Footypedia, was published by Century in June 2008 and his writing appeared in Faber & Faber's book Shouting At The Telly, published in November 2009.

Maier is married to author and Guardian journalist Sali Hughes.
