= The Shepherd (upcoming film) =

2026 film by John Hyams

- Directed by: John Hyams
- Written by: Alexander Gustaveson
- Produced by: Steven Schneider; Roy Lee; Ben Cornwell; Jordan Foley; Nick Smith; Jonathan Rosenthal; Sébastien Raybaud
- Starring: David Dastmalchian; Georgina Campbell
- Production companies: Spooky Pictures; Image Nation Studios; Anton; Paperclip Ltd.
- Distributed by: Magnolia Pictures
- Country: United States
- Language: English

The Shepherd is an upcoming American horror thriller film directed by John Hyams, written by Alexander Gustaveson, and starring David Dastmalchian and Georgina Campbell. The film will be released in the United States by Magnolia Pictures.

== Premise ==
In Nevada, a young woman in labor is on the run from her abusive ex. She hitches a ride through the desert with a frightening stranger, only to realize he's on a mission to destroy the mysterious cargo resting in the backseat.

== Cast ==
- David Dastmalchian
- Georgina Campbell
- Matthew Patrick Davis

== Production ==
=== Development ===
On May 7, 2025, Variety reported that David Dastmalchian and Georgina Campbell will star in the horror-thriller The Shepherd, directed by John Hyams from a screenplay written by Alexander Gustaveson. The film is produced by Spooky Pictures and Image Nation Abu Dhabi and financed by Anton and Image Nation. The Shepherd reunites the producers from Late Night with the Devil (2023) (starring Dastmalchian), Steven Schneider and Roy Lee, along with Ben Cornwell, Jordan Foley and Nick Smith for Paperclip Ltd., and Jonathan Rosenthal and Sébastien Raybaud for Anton. Dastmalchian (for his Good Fiend Films company) and Campbell also serve as executive producers. That same month, Anton launched sales for the film at the 2025 Cannes Film Festival. In late November 2025, Matthew Patrick Davis revealed that he had joined the cast.

=== Filming ===
Principal photography began in Las Cruces, New Mexico on November 1, 2025, and was scheduled to wrap on March 8, 2026.

== Release ==
The film will be released in the United States by Magnolia Pictures.
