= Blackmere =

Upcoming television series

- Created by: Charlie Brooker
- Written by: Charlie Brooker; Ben Caudell; Jason Hazeley; Emer Kenny; Daniel Maier; Joel Morris; Victoria Asare Archer
- Directed by: Al Campbell
- Starring: Paddy Considine; Georgina Campbell; Lena Headey
- Country of origin: United Kingdom
- Original language: English

Production
- Executive producers: Charlie Brooker; Jessica Rhoades; Annabel Jones; Mark Kinsella
- Producer: Richard Webb

Original release
- Network: Netflix

Blackmere is an upcoming four-part detective series created by Charlie Brooker for Netflix starring Paddy Considine, Georgina Campbell, Rory Kinnear and Lena Headey.

== Premise ==
A northern police detective travels to London on the heels of a serial killer.

== Cast ==
- Paddy Considine as John Blackmere
- Georgina Campbell
- Lena Headey
- Rory Kinnear
- Brendan Patricks

== Production ==
The series is directed by Al Campbell. It is created by Charlie Brooker, and written alongside Ben Caudell, Jason Hazeley, Emer Kenny, Daniel Maier and Joel Morris with additional material by Victoria Asare Archer. The four-part series is produced by Richard Webb with Charlie Brooker, Jessica Rhoades, Mark Kinsella and Annabel Jones executive producers.

Paddy Considine, Georgina Campbell, Rory Kinnear and Lena Headey lead the cast.

Filming began in London in September 2025 and continued the following month in Manchester.

The series title was confirmed as Blackmere in September 2026, along with first-look images from filming released to the media.

== Release ==
The series will be available on Netflix in early 2027.
