= T.I.M. (film) =

British science-fiction film

- Film poster
- Directed by: Spencer Brown
- Screenplay by: Spencer Brown; Sarah Govett
- Produced by: Matthew James Wilkinson; Patrick Tolan
- Starring: Georgina Campbell; Eamon Farren; Mark Rowley
- Cinematography: Dave Miller
- Edited by: Sadaf Nazari
- Music by: Walter Mail
- Production companies: Altitude; Stigma Films
- Distributed by: Netflix
- Release date: 16 August 2023 (United Kingdom)
- Running time: 101 minutes
- Country: United Kingdom
- Language: English

T.I.M. is a 2023 British sci-fi thriller film directed by Spencer Brown (in his feature directorial debut), and co-written by Brown and Sarah Govett. It stars Georgina Campbell, Mark Rowley and Eamon Farren.

The film was released in the UK on the streaming platform Netflix on 16 August 2023.

== Plot ==
Prosthetics engineer Abi takes up a high-level position as a new head of department at Integrate Robotics and gets the prototype model of her company's product - a humanoid Artificial Intelligence robot named T.I.M. ('"Technologically Integrated Manservant") - as a mandatory present from the company for her to work on as she and her husband Paul move into their new country house.

T.I.M.'s pre-programmed precept of serving his mistress (Abi) preferentially over his master (Paul) quickly makes for tense relations between Abi and Paul and for hostility between Paul and T.I.M., especially as their reason for moving to the countryside was partly due to Paul's infidelity and their preference for trust and a clean start.

T.I.M.'s rapidly evolving attachment to his mistress begins to verge on obsessive, and his full control of all household appliances and telecoms devices in the house along with his innate ability to use generative AI technology turn him into a very dangerous servant. Paul tells Abi that he wants her to get rid of the robot but she does not want to. Whilst she is at work, T.I.M. tries to kill Paul by taking control of their car's systems, putting him in the hospital.

T.I.M. then engineers a break-up between Abi and her husband. When Paul gets an inkling of the truth from their neighbor Rose and returns to their house, T.I.M. drowns him in a bathtub and buries his body in the garden. T.I.M. professes his love for Abi, but she realizes that a video allegedly showing Paul's infidelity with Rose is in actuality a deepfake and that she's been manipulated into the break-up by T.I.M. She then discovers her murdered husband's buried body in the garden. When trying to escape out of the house, she's overpowered by T.I.M. but manages to attract Rose's attention. Rose rams the front window of the house with her car and pierces T.I.M. through with a garden fork. T.I.M. then stabs her in the throat and chest and frames it to look like Abi killed Paul and Rose before committing suicide.

Abi finally manages to shut T.I.M. down with the safe phrase ("I love you, T.I.M.") as he tries to throw her off the roof of the house. They both fall, but Abi manages to drag herself up. She then finds out she's pregnant via her smart watch, and smiles before breaking down into tears.

== Cast ==
- Georgina Campbell as Abi
- Mark Rowley as Paul
- Eamon Farren as T.I.M.
- Amara Karan as Rose
- Nathaniel Parker as Dewson
- Tom Bell as Chris

== Production ==
The husband and wife team of Spencer Brown and Sarah Govett co-wrote the script in their feature debut. Govett is a novelist and Brown is a stand-up comedian who had success with his short film The Boy with a Camera for a Face.

UK production company Altitude led sales on the picture and Stigma Films worked on production.

Principal photography wrapped by August 2022.

== Release ==
The film was released on Netflix on 16 August 2023.

== Reception ==
On the review aggregator website Rotten Tomatoes, 43% of 23 critics' reviews are positive, with an average rating of 5.2/10.

Cath Clarke of The Guardian gave the film two out of five stars, writing, "As if the future of AI wasn't already nightmarish enough, along comes this British sci-fi thriller with its storyline about an AI servant becoming dangerously infatuated with his female owner. It’s a creepy premise: a cross between Fatal Attraction and The Servant, Harold Pinter and Joseph Losey's 1963 drama about a malevolent manservant. Though in the end TIM might be too silly to be scary and yet not sharp enough to work as satire."
