= Spencer Brown (comedian) =

English comedian, actor and writer

Spencer Brown is an English comedian, actor, director and writer from London. His style is surreal and contains elements of slapstick, absurdity and silliness. He is currently presenting The Sexy Ads Show on Fiver/Channel Five.

He co-hosted ITV2's Lip Service with Holly Willoughby, and acted in a number of notable television comedies including Nathan Barley, Man to Man with Dean Learner, and Garth Marenghi's Darkplace, as well as in London's West End. His stand up album, Things I Don't Have To Do, was released in the summer of 2006. He appeared on the fifth season of the NBC TV show Last Comic Standing. He was a member of the Cambridge Footlights troupe that included Matthew Holness, Richard Ayoade and John Oliver. He was also a founding member of the Alternative Alternative movement. In 2009, Brown appeared in 3 mobile's sponsorship bumpers for various Channel 4 comedy programmes.

His debut feature film as writer/director, T.I.M., appeared on Netflix on August 16, 2023.

== Personal life ==
He is married to the novelist Sarah Govett. They worked together on the script of the film T.I.M.

== Works ==
=== Discography ===
- Things I Don't Have To Do (2006)

=== Feature films ===
- Shed of the Dead
- T.I.M.

=== Short films ===
- Shop Idol
- The Shower

=== Television films ===
- The Roundabout (2011)
- Naked But Funny (2010)

=== Television series ===
- The Sexy Ads Show
- Last Comic Standing ?
- Nathan Barley
- Don't Get Screwed

=== Music videos ===
- "She the Queen"
