= Modesta Vžesniauskaitė =

Lithuanian cyclist (born 1983)

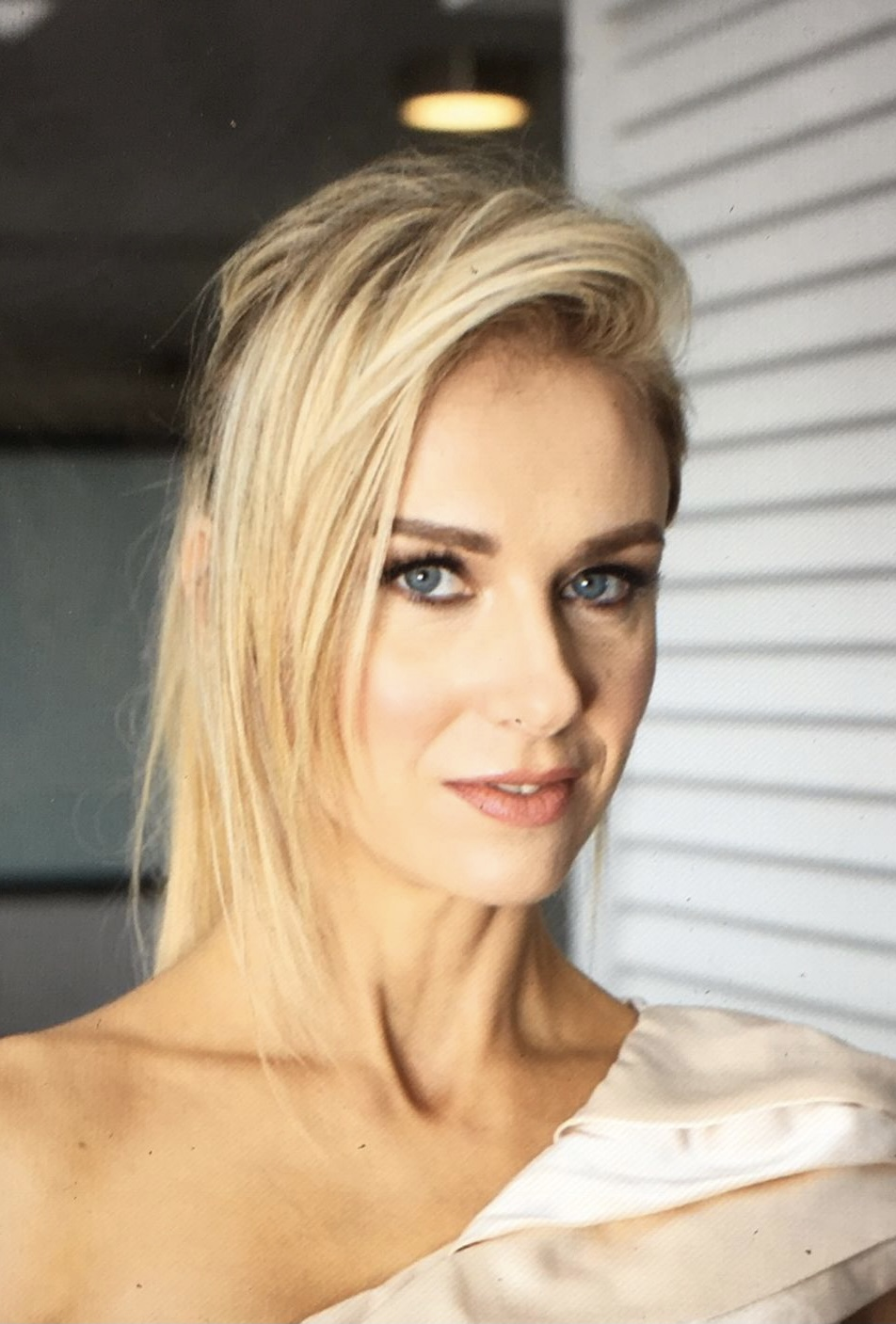

Personal information
- Born: 17 October 1983 (age 42) Panevėžys, Lithuanian SSR, Soviet Union
- Height: 1.74 m (5 ft 8 1/2 in)
- Weight: 55 kg (121 lb)

Cycling career
- Sport: Cycling
- Discipline: Road cycling

Modesta Vžesniauskaitė (born 17 October 1983) is a Lithuanian former road racing cyclist who competed at the 2008 Summer Olympics. She competed in the women's road race, and completed the run in twenty-seventh place with a time of 3:33:17.

== Career achievements ==
- 2004 World Road Championships – 5th place
- 2004 Giro d'Italia Femminile – 5th place
- 2005 European under-23 Championships – 3rd place
- 2005 Giro di San Marino – 1st place
- 2008 Summer Olympics – 27th place
- 2008 Lithuanian National Road Championships – 1st place
- Present - Charity Ambassador for Caudwell Children

== Personal life ==
Vžesniauskaitė's partner is English billionaire John Caudwell; the couple met through cycling and have been together since 2015. The couple have two children together, a son born 2021 and a daughter born 2023. Vžesniauskaitė also has a son from her previous marriage (born 2012).
