= Lovely, Dark, and Deep =

2023 horror film by Teresa Sutherland

- Theatrical release poster
- Directed by: Teresa Sutherland
- Screenplay by: Teresa Sutherland
- Produced by: Josh Waller
- Starring: Georgina Campbell; Nick Blood; Wai Ching Ho
- Cinematography: Rui Poças
- Edited by: Alexandra Amick
- Music by: Shida Shahabi
- Production companies: Woodhead Creative; House of Quest Films; QWGmire
- Distributed by: XYZ Films
- Release dates: July 23, 2023 (Fantasia); February 22, 2024 (United States)
- Running time: 87 minutes
- Country: United States
- Language: English

Lovely, Dark, and Deep is a 2023 American horror film written and directed by Teresa Sutherland in her feature directorial debut. Starring Georgina Campbell, Nick Blood, and Wai Ching Ho, the film follows Lennon (Campbell), a backcountry ranger who, hoping to uncover the origins of a tragedy that has haunted her since childhood, begins her new job at Arvores National Park, where several employees and hikers have gone missing.

Lovely, Dark, and Deep premiered at the Fantasia International Film Festival on July 23, 2023, and was theatrically released in the United States on February 22, 2024, to critical acclaim, with particular praise for Campbell's performance and Sutherland's direction.

== Plot ==
Lennon is a backcountry ranger starting a new job in Arvores National Park where a number of fellow rangers and members of the public have gone missing, including Lennon's predecessor. In her ranger cabin, Lennon keeps track of these missing people. During a hike, she becomes lost and hears distorted sounds and messages over her handheld transceiver, even with its batteries out. She is found by fellow ranger Jackson.

The rangers receive notice that a hiker, Sarah Greenberg, has gone missing. The rangers, coordinated by head ranger Zhang, form a search party, but Jackson orders Lennon to stay at base camp in case Sarah returns. Spurred by her memories of when her own younger sister, Jenny, disappeared in the woods in childhood, Lennon disobeys orders and searches for Sarah. She finds Sarah in the woods at night, bloody and disoriented, asking Lennon if she is real. Sarah is rescued but Zhang notifies Lennon that she is fired for disobeying a direct order and to await airlift out of Arvores in five days.

Rather than wait, Lennon hikes through the park, but begins experiencing disturbing visions. She hears Jackson over the transceiver, informing her of another missing hiker. She searches for the hiker, but finds herself inexplicably miles away on the other side of the park by the lake. Jackson's voice distorts and tells her that she is where she is meant to be, and she took something she must replace. Jenny appears and tells her that "they" will keep Lennon unless she replaces what she took, implying that by rescuing Sarah she took from "them". She finds two hikers camped in the woods, but finds that they cannot see or hear her. She sees a vision of herself, instructing her to kill one of the campers, thereby replacing what she took. She refuses and continues to have disturbing visions, finally telling "them" that if murder is what will free her, then they can keep her.

Lennon makes her way back to her cabin, but when she enters, she finds herself in her childhood home, and is forced to relive memories of Jenny's disappearance and the devastation it caused her family. She sees missing people in the distorted house, including her predecessor and Jenny. Messages from the past reveal that Zhang found Jenny during the search, but recognized her as being "taken" by the entities rather than lost, and the rangers lied to her parents about Jenny's whereabouts. Zhang appears; Lennon asks if she is real and Zhang says she is. Zhang explains that the entities take people away for unknown reasons, keeping them in this place, and the rangers allow them to. The entities allow the rangers to explain the phenomenon to other recruits because the rangers protect their dark, forested domain. Zhang expresses regret for how many people she has let them take, especially Jenny. She refuses to let them take Lennon and opts to stay behind as a replacement. She bids her goodbye, before Lennon is dragged underwater and Zhang is pulled away. Lennon emerges in the lake and is rescued by Jackson.

Some time later, the new ranger recruits are sent out to their assignments, with Zhang listed as another missing person. Lennon is called to find another missing hiker. She finds him disoriented, but when he asks if she is real, she recognizes that he is one of the "taken". She responds that she is not real and walks away, leaving him to his fate.

== Cast ==
- Georgina Campbell as Lennon
- Nick Blood as Jackson
- Wai Ching Ho as Zhang
- Mick Greer as Mr Finley
- Celia Williams as Mrs Finley
- Soren Hellerup as Benjamin Varney

== Production ==
Written and directed by Teresa Sutherland in her feature length debut, the title of the movie is taken from a line of Robert Frost’s poem Stopping by Woods on a Snowy Evening.

The film is edited by Alexandra Amick. Josh Waller is producer for Woodhead Creative. Stefanie Coimbra is executive producer for House of Quest Films, alongside Molly C. Quinn, Matthew M. Welty, and Elan Gale for QWGmire. In October 2021, it was reported that Georgina Campbell, Nick Blood and Wai Ching Ho were in lead roles in the film which had entered principal photography in Portugal. The cast also includes Mick Greer, and Celia Williams.

== Release ==
Lovely, Dark, and Deep had its world premiere at the Fantasia International Film Festival in Montreal in July 2023, before its theatrically released and on VOD on February 22, 2024, by XYZ Films.

== Reception ==
On the review aggregator website Rotten Tomatoes, 89% of 37 critics' reviews are positive, with an average rating of 6.8/10. The website's consensus reads: "Effectively playing on fundamental fears, Lovely, Dark, and Deep is a creepy calling card for debuting director Teresa Sutherland that's further distinguished by Georgina Campbell's haunting performance."
