= Phones 4u =

Mobile phone company

Phones 4u Ltd.

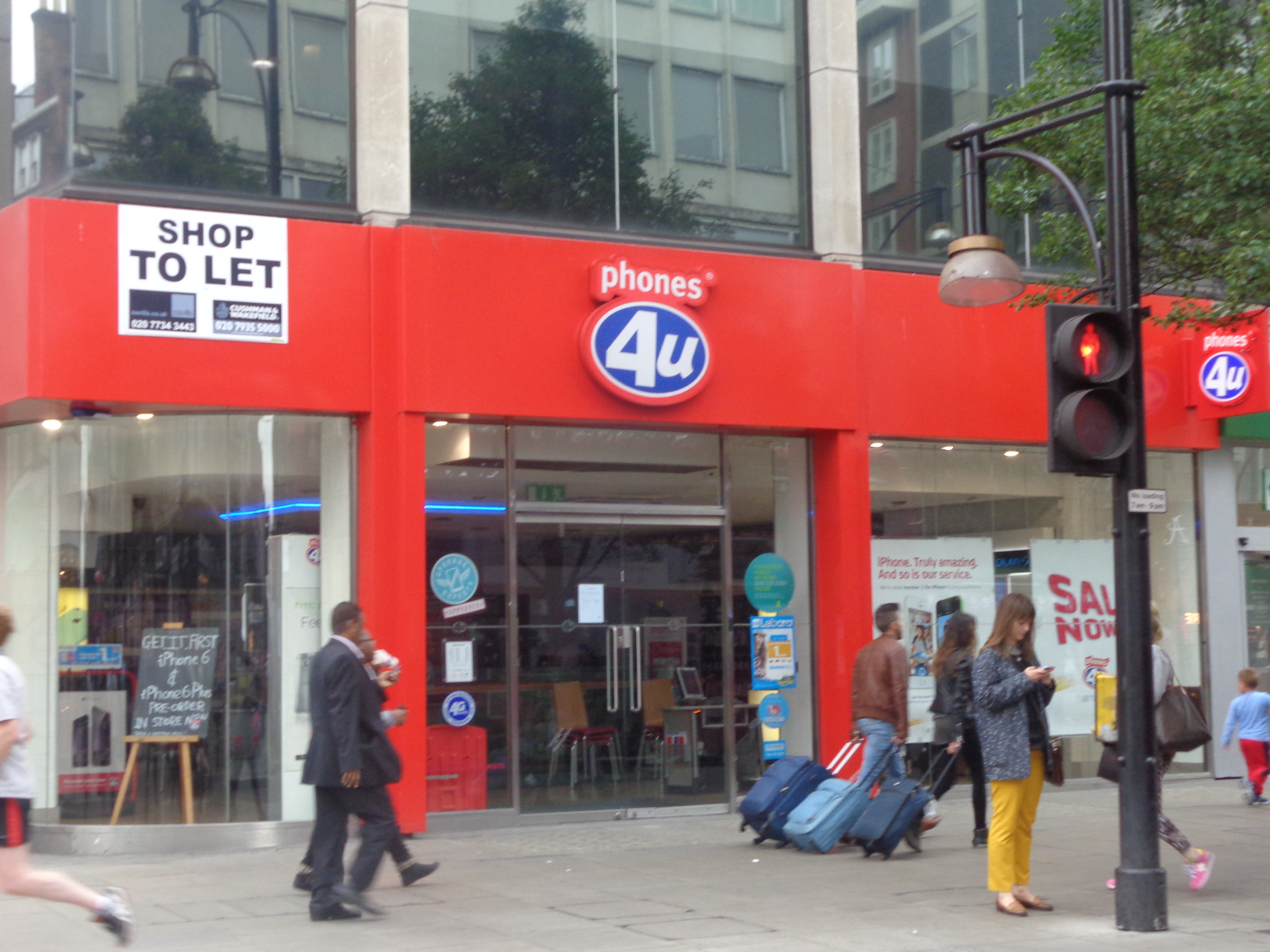
- A closed branch on Oxford Street in London following the group's collapse.
- Type: Subsidiary
- Industry: Telecommunications
- Founded: 1987 (as Midlands Mobile Sales); 1996 (as Phones 4u); 2026 (Relaunch)
- Founder: John Caudwell and Brian Morrison
- Defunct: 15 September 2014
- Fate: Entered administration
- Headquarters: Newcastle-under-Lyme, England
- Key people: Tim Whiting (CEO)
- Products: Home, mobile telephone equipment and services
- Owner: AO World
- Parent: 4u Group
- Divisions: 4u Wi-Fi Limited; Jump 4u Limited; Phosphorus Acquisition Ltd; Phones 4u Group Limited
- Subsidiaries: Phones 4u Limited; Life Mobile Limited; Dial-a-Phone; MobileServ Limited; Phones 4u Finance Plc; The Discovery Store
- Website: www.phones4u.co.uk

Phones 4u is a British online mobile phone retailer based in the United Kingdom. The company was founded in 1996 and was one of the largest mobile phone retailers in the UK before it ceased operations and filed for administration on 15 September 2014. Since then, the company has been under the control of its administrators, PwC. Following the conclusion of the administration in June 2026 and the dissolution of the original corporate entity in September 2026, the brand has been relaunched as an online-only retailer by electricals group AO World on 17 November 2026.

== History ==
In 1987, John Caudwell and his brother Brian founded Midlands Mobile Phones, a wholesaler and distributor of mobile phones. The company became the Caudwell Group, whose high street retail arm was named Phones 4u.

On 26 September 2006, The Caudwell Group, which owned Phones 4u, was sold for a sum of £1.47 billion to private equity firms Providence Equity Partners and Doughty Hanson & Co. In February 2008, the group bought online retailer Dialaphone in a deal worth an estimated £9 million.

In July 2010, Phones 4u partnered with electrical chain Dixons to place 49 concessions inside Currys and PC World stores. This number increased to over 100. However, following a merger between Dixons and rival phone shop, Carphone Warehouse, it was announced that this partnership would not be renewed.

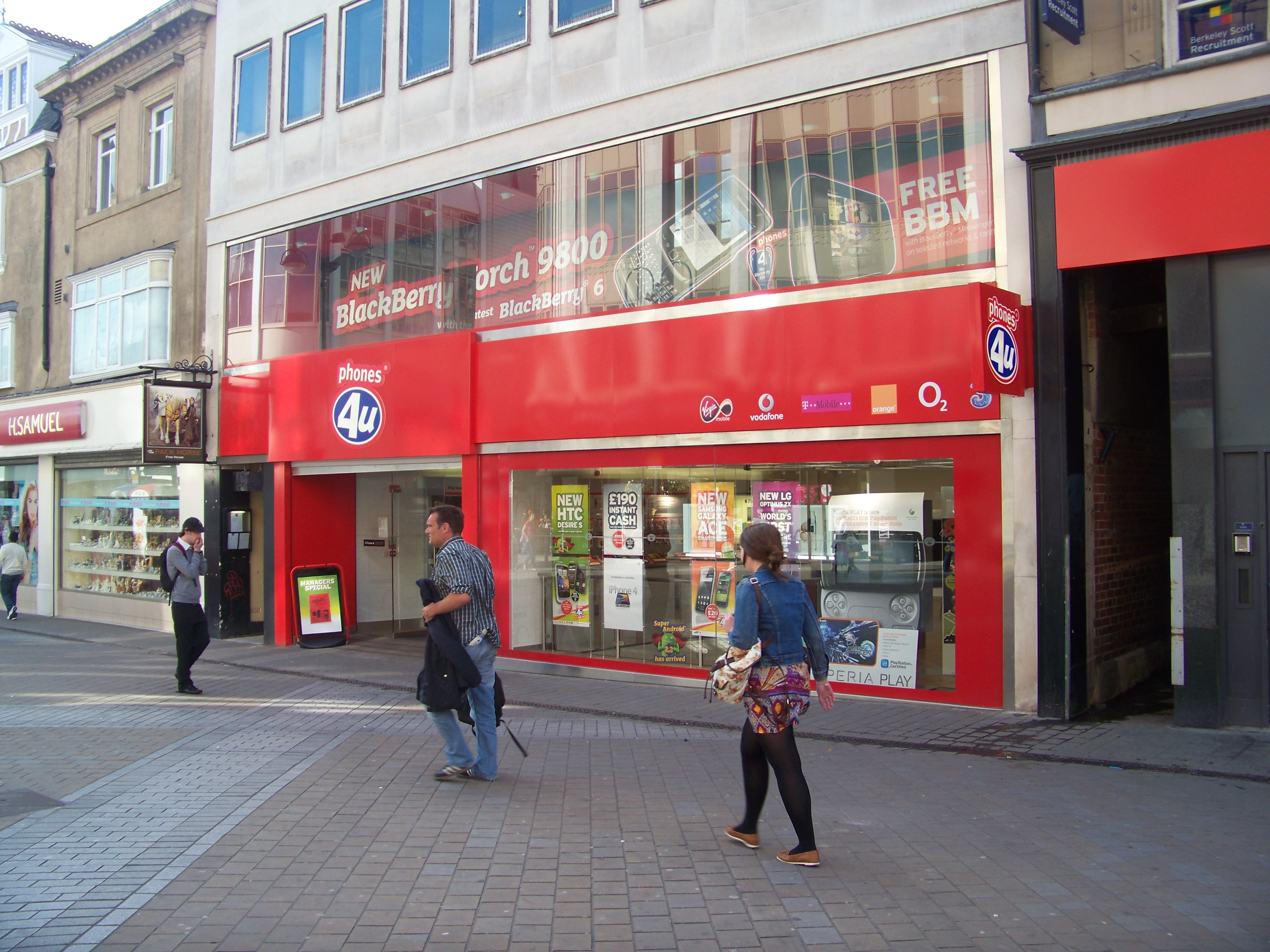
A branch of Phones 4u on Briggate in Leeds.

The group was acquired by private equity group BC Partners in March 2011. The deal, estimated to be more than £600 million, was agreed several months after talks with a United States private equity owner ended. In April 2012, Phones 4u's contract with provider Three UK was terminated. In January 2014, O2 ended their contract with Phones 4u.

=== Administration ===
On 15 September 2014, Phones 4u entered administration, after the two remaining suppliers EE and Vodafone terminated their contracts. Stores closed, and both the Phones 4u and Dial-A-Phone websites were taken offline, pending a decision by the administrators.

On 19 September 2014, Vodafone reached an agreement with the administrators of Phones 4u to take over and rebrand 140 stores. It was also revealed that 628 employees at the head office in Newcastle-Under-Lyme would be made redundant.

On 22 September 2014, EE reached an agreement with Phones 4u's administrators to take over and rebrand 58 stores, while Dixons Carphone revealed that they would transfer 800 employees to its Currys and PC World stores.

On 23 September 2014, administrators PwC announced that close to 1,700 jobs would be lost.

On 14 October 2014, EE announced that it would acquire mobile virtual network operator Life Mobile from Phones 4u's administrators.

=== Post-administration litigation ===
In May 2022, a trial began in the High Court as a result of legal action brought by the administrators of Phones 4u, against various UK and foreign companies from the UK mobile telecoms sector.

The lawsuit broadly alleged those companies engaged in unlawful collusion in breach of UK and EU antitrust law, resulting in the collapse of Phones 4u, and additionally alleged EE breached its contract with Phones 4u. The lawsuit requested a remedy of compensatory damages from the defendants.

In November 2023, the court handed down its judgement, finding for the defendants and dismissing all of Phones 4u's claims.

Phones4u appealed the judgement to the Court of Appeal, which dismissed the appeal on all grounds in July 2025.

In September 2025, the company's administrators confirmed that it had ceased its claims and reported the litigation costed it £80 million in legal fees.

=== Relaunch under AO World ===
On 17 November 2026, British online electrical retailer AO World relaunched Phones 4u as an online-only mobile phone retailer, 12 years after the brand collapsed and exited the UK high street.

Operating alongside AO's existing mobile portfolio—which includes Mobile Phones Direct, Affordable Mobiles, Buymobiles, musicMagpie, and the AO Mobile virtual network launched in August 2026—the revived platform offers new and refurbished handsets from manufacturers such as Apple, Samsung, Google, and Motorola. The site provides SIM-free devices, SIM-only plans, and pay-monthly contracts across multiple networks, including O2, Vodafone, Three, VOXI, SMARTY, Talkmobile, and AO Mobile.

== Former corporate structure ==
The 4u Group consisted of the following entities:

- Phones 4u Limited — high street and online retailer
- Life Mobile Limited — a mobile virtual network operator, running on EE
- Dial-a-Phone — online retailer
- Policy Administration Services — mobile phone insurance provider
- 4u Wi-Fi Limited
- Jump 4u Limited
- MobileServ Limited
- Phosphorus Acquisition Limited
- Phones 4u Group Limited
- Phones 4u Finance plc

== Sales and service ==
Before 2008, complaints surfaced about shoppers feeling pressured by hard sell tactics for phone insurance, negative service perceptions and high staff turnover. The retailer retrained staff and eliminated some of its more aggressive practices, including street-fighting, the practice of sales people standing in shop doorways to lure customers.

In November 2008, Ofcom found Phones 4u guilty of misleading customers over network coverage, failing to swiftly provide refunds for faulty handsets and offering unfair terms on chequeback schemes. Phones 4u responded with a series of undertakings to prevent recurrences. The company said 80% of complaints were due to problems in its repair business, rather than sales, which the company was in the process of resolving.

After six months of scrutiny, the Ofcom investigation resulted in minor changes to terms and conditions. Phones 4u subsequently changed its repair provider.

Turnover for the mobile phone retailer grew 22% in 2010, rising from £746m to £911m. The group employed over 8,000 people worldwide and sold 26 phones every minute. In November 2011 it was reported that despite the company's turnover having increased, the rising cost of providing insurance with smartphones had contributed to a 25% loss of earnings.

== Advertising and sponsorship ==
Phones 4u was noted for its effective and controversial advertising campaigns.

A shirt sponsorship deal was agreed with Birmingham City F.C. for two seasons, beginning in August 2001. Phones 4u also sponsored Watford F.C for two seasons starting in 1999.

In 2004, the comedy duo Flight of the Conchords featured in a television advert driving up and down Britain singing about the latest offers.

Phones 4u's campaign of 2006 starred a variety of eccentric characters, including "Jack" and "Scary Mary", who needed help with their mobile phones. The adverts were often set at the British seaside and featured the Phones 4u hand gesture for the first time, which would be revived for later campaigns.

In the summer of 2009, Phones 4u and communications agency Adam & Eve launched a new advertising campaign based around social networking, popularity called "Great Deals for Popular People". The theme around the campaign was that the customer needs to have 50 contacts on their phone to get Phones 4u's best deals. In one of the ads, a scout master was displayed with the caption "You may be good with knots, you may be good with children, but there's no way you've got 50 friends on your phone", along with a large "NO" sticker. The campaign met criticism from The Scout Association, and the advert was pulled.

In May 2010, it launched the "It's What We Do" campaign. Television adverts showed Bangkok prison guards getting accustomed to a new handset.

In September 2011, the Advertising Standards Authority banned a Phones 4u advert depicting Buddy Christ alongside a range of Android phones with the message "Miraculous deals on Samsung Galaxy Android phones".

The ASA said "although the ads were intended to be light hearted and humorous, their depiction of Jesus winking and holding a thumbs up sign, with the text 'miraculous' deals during Easter, the Christian Holy Week which celebrated Christ's resurrection, gave the impression that they were mocking and belittling core Christian beliefs."

Later in October 2011, Phones 4u switched its advertising focus to a broader demographic, spending £5.2m on a horror themed price led promotion called "Missing Our Deals Will Haunt You". The campaign included two television advertisements: one taking inspiration from horror movies, featuring a young girl; with the other making a play on the classic zombie genre.

The former advertisement received the most complaints filed with the ASA for any advert in 2011, however the complaints were rejected by the ASA who said "The programmes the advert was screened around were unlikely to be viewed by children."

Phones 4u backed its advertising campaigns with television programme sponsorships, including Hollyoaks and Harry Hill's TV Burp. On 31 July 2013, it was announced that Phones 4u had secured a five-year sponsorship deal with the Manchester Arena, renaming the arena as the Phones 4u Arena. In July 2014, it launched the "#FutureYou" campaign. Television adverts featured the DeLorean time machine famous from the Back to the Future films.
