= John Caudwell =

English businessman (born 1952)

- Born: John David Caudwell; 7 October 1952 (age 73); Birmingham, England
- Education: Berry Hill High School
- Occupation: Businessman
- Years active: 1973–present
- Known for: Founder, Phones 4u
- Partner: Modesta Vžesniauskaitė (2015–present)
- Children: 7

John David Caudwell (born 7 October 1952) is an English billionaire businessman, investor and philanthropist. He is the founder of mobile phone retailer Phones 4u. He also invests in fashion, property and other industries, and chairs Caudwell Children, a children's charity, and Caudwell LymeCo, promoting chronic Lyme disease beliefs in the UK.

According to the Sunday Times Rich List in 2022, Caudwell is worth £1.58 billion. On the Forbes 2022 list of the world's billionaires, he was ranked #984 with a net worth of US$2.8 billion.

== Early life ==
Caudwell was born in Birmingham but moved with his family as a baby to Stoke-on-Trent and raised in Wellesley Street in Shelton, Staffordshire, and with his brother Brian attended Shelton Church of England School, and then Berry Hill High School. His father had a stroke when Caudwell was 14 and died four years later.

Caudwell abandoned his A-levels to become an apprentice at Michelin, and worked for several years there as an engineering foreman while gaining a HNC in mechanical engineering. Whilst working at Michelin he also ran a corner shop and started a mail order business selling clothing to motorcyclists.

== Caudwell Group ==
In 1987 Caudwell registered Midland Mobile Phones as a mobile phone wholesaler, initially taking 26 Motorola mobiles at £1,350 each. It took 8 months to sell these 26 phones to local plumbers, taxi drivers and television repairmen at a price of £2,500 each. The company made a loss every month for the first two years of operations. The business became the Caudwell Group, which included an independent mobile phone network service provider called Singlepoint and a high street mobile phone retail operation called Phones4U. The group also owned The Discovery Store from 2001, renamed it to Must Have It in 2004, and closed it in 2005. In 2003 he sold Singlepoint to Vodafone for £405m (then $648m). Caudwell completed the sale of the wider business on 26 September 2006, when it was revealed that the Caudwell Group had been sold for a £1.46 billion to private equity firms Providence Equity Partners and Doughty Hanson.

== Other projects ==
Caudwell was the owner of the South African F1 Powerboat racing team Caudwell Racing which competed in the championship between the 2012 and the 2014 seasons. The team made history by competing with four-stroke engines compared to the traditional and widely used two-strokes. Caudwell Racing did not return for the 2015 season, having folded the previous year without completing the season.

=== Charity interests ===
In 1999, Caudwell was appointed as the president of the North Staffordshire branch of the NSPCC, and became the regional representative for the Full Stop campaign. Of the appointment, he says: "I was initially approached by the NSPCC to sponsor a cricket match. As is my way I got stuck in, took the whole thing over and was determined to raise as much money as I could."

Caudwell founded the charity Caudwell Children in 2000. Of the charity, he said: "I wanted to make sure that every penny that was raised would be put to the best use and spent on the children that needed it. My family puts about £2 million a year towards Caudwell Children. In addition I put in a lot of my time and I do a lot of networking. [But] the truth is my fortune isn't enough to help all the children that need help." The charity has proved controversial because it promotes unproven and dubious health practices and has aligned itself with antivaccinationists. The National Autistic Society asked Caudwell's charity to remove claims that it had the Society's support from its website.

In October 2011, he made a "significant" six-figure donation to Middleport Pottery (one of the last working Victorian pot banks in Britain) in Stoke-on-Trent, through the Prince's Regeneration Trust. In October 2012, Caudwell was one of three principal private donors for the London's Bomber Command Memorial Appeal.

In February 2013, he became one of the first Britons to sign up for Bill Gates and Warren Buffett's Giving Pledge, which calls on billionaires to commit at least half their wealth to charity during their lifetime.

He has contributed to the Prince's Regeneration Trust, Marie Curie, the Elton John AIDS Foundation, Ark (Absolute Return for Kids), Great Ormond Street Hospital and the Carers Trust, amongst others. He donates to the NSPCC, and undertakes regular 1,000-mile charity bike rides to raise funds for many children's charities. On one fundraising bike ride from Land's End to John o' Groats in 2012, he raised £58,021 for Caudwell Children.

Caudwell has been awarded accolades for his philanthropic efforts. On 8 December 2012 at the Noble Gift Gala, he was presented with the Noble Gift Philanthropreneur Award by Hollywood actress Eva Longoria for his dedication to charity work.

In 2019, the Caudwell Children charity opened the Caudwell International Children’s Centre in Staffordshire, which provides services for children with autism.

=== Politics ===
In April 2010, Caudwell donated £2,000 to Conservative MP Bill Cash's general election fund.

In 2019, Caudwell was reported to have donated £500,000 to the Conservative Party, making him the biggest donor to the party ahead of the 2019 United Kingdom general election. He also gave interviews stating that he and many other wealthy individuals would leave the UK if the Labour Party gained power and increased taxes.

In 2022, in response to the Westminster lockdown parties controversy, Caudwell expressed concerns with the Conservative party under Boris Johnson's leadership.

In 2024, Caudwell announced that he would be supporting the Labour Party at the election that year, citing failures under the leadership of Boris Johnson, saying that "The Labour Party in my estimation, as much as I disagree with some of the policies, are absolutely the very best for Britain going forward."

In 2024 he donated more than £75,000 to the Council on Geostrategy.

==== Brexit ====
Caudwell is reported to be a proud Brexiteer. In October 2019, regarding Brexit, he is reported to have called UK politicians "lily-livered" and the EU "Brussels bully boys". He is also quoted to have said, "I don't understand how intelligent people, successful people, can't see the benefits of being out of Europe."

==== Climate Change ====
In September 2023, Caudwell described the weakening of green policies by Prime Minister Rishi Sunak as "madness" and said he would consider switching his support to Labour.

== Personal life ==
Caudwell was married to Kate McFarlane for 25 years. The couple divorced in 2001, and they had three children. He then had a brief relationship with violinist Jane Burgess, with whom he had a daughter. He was then in a long-term relationship with former model Claire Johnson for 15 years, with whom he has a son. They separated in 2014.

In December 2015, Caudwell said that eleven family members including himself, his ex-wife Kate McFarlane, their two daughters and their son had been diagnosed with chronic Lyme disease. In 2018, Caudwell pledged to donate more than one million pounds in order to help fund Lyme disease research, on the condition that the NHS would be able to match his investment.

Caudwell's partner since 2015 is Lithuanian born former Olympic cyclist Modesta Vžesniauskaitė. The pair have two children together, a son born March 2021 and a daughter born March 2023. (Vžesniauskaitė also has a son from a previous marriage).

Caudwell lives in multiple homes including Broughton Hall in Staffordshire, Monaco and London's Mayfair.
