= Georgina Campbell =

English actress (born 1992)

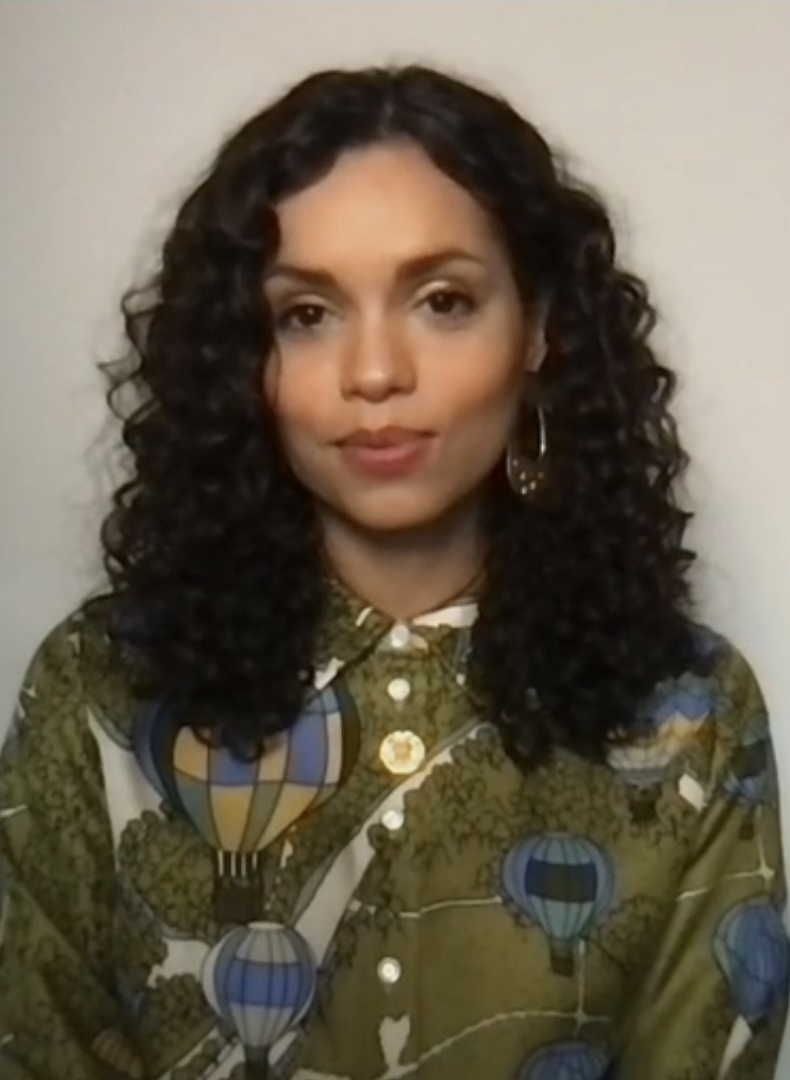
- Campbell in 2022
- Born: 12 June 1992 (age 34); Sheffield, South Yorkshire, England
- Education: Royal Holloway, University of London (BA)
- Occupation: Actress
- Years active: 2009–present
- Partner: Dawson Taylor (2019–present)

Georgina Campbell (born 12 June 1992) is an English actress. Campbell made her acting debut at age sixteen in the web series Freak (2009). She won the 2015 BAFTA TV Award for Best Actress for Murdered by My Boyfriend (2014), making her the first black and first non-white actress to win that award. Her other television credits include The Ice Cream Girls (2013), Flowers (2016), Broadchurch (2017), the Black Mirror episode "Hang the DJ" (2017), Krypton (2018), The Pale Horse (2020), and Suspicion (2022). She made her film debut with a minor role in King Arthur: Legend of the Sword (2017).

Campbell has been dubbed a "scream queen" for her starring roles in horror films such as Barbarian (2022), Bird Box Barcelona (2023), T.I.M. (2023), Lovely, Dark, and Deep (2023), The Watchers (2024), Influencers (2025), and Cold Storage (2026). In 2019, Campbell was featured on Forbes 30 Under 30 Europe list.

== Early life and education ==
Georgina Campbell was born on 12 June 1992 in Sheffield, South Yorkshire, England, to a white English mother and a Jamaican father. Her mother is a retired teacher and her father is a police officer. She is the second of three daughters. After her parents divorced, she was primarily raised by her mother and stepfather in Dartford, Kent. She spent her younger years in Wilmington.

Before becoming an actor, Campbell wanted to be a flight attendant. Campbell graduated with a Bachelor of Arts in Film Studies from Royal Holloway, University of London in 2014.

== Career ==
=== 2009–2020 ===
At 16, Campbell was scouted in the street for her first role as Lucy in the 2009 web series Freak. She had minor roles in series such as Casualty, Holby City, Doctors, and Death in Paradise. Campbell was 22 when she won the BAFTA TV Award for Best Actress for her role as Ashley Jones in the BBC Three television film Murdered by My Boyfriend (2014), making her the first black and first non-white Best Actress winner.

In 2015, Campbell starred in the Sky 1 comedy drama After Hours as Jasmine. The first season was directed by Craig Cash and was broadcast in November 2015. She had a lead role in the TV mini-series Tripped (2015), a supporting role in the BBC drama mini-series One of Us (2016), and she appeared in Channel 4 black comedy series Flowers (2016).

In 2017, she made her film debut with a minor role in Guy Ritchie's King Arthur: Legend of the Sword, and appeared in the ITV drama series Broadchurch as DC Katie Harford, and in Black Mirror, series 4 episode 4, "Hang the DJ", as Amy. In 2018, she began playing Lyta-Zod in Syfy drama series Krypton.

In 2019, she appeared in one episode of HBO's fantasy drama television series His Dark Materials. In February 2019, Campbell was featured on Forbes 30 Under 30 Europe list.

In 2020, Campbell appeared in the mystery-drama miniseries The Pale Horse, and in the sci-fi anthology series Soulmates.

=== 2021–present ===
In 2021, Campbell appeared in her first horror film, Andrew Gaynord's comedy-horror All My Friends Hate Me.

In 2022, she starred in the critically acclaimed, commercially successful horror film Barbarian, directed by Zach Cregger.

In 2023, she co-starred in the post-apocalyptic horror thriller film Bird Box Barcelona, in the sci-fi thriller T.I.M., and in the horror film Lovely, Dark, and Deep.

In 2024, Campbell co-starred in the supernatural horror film The Watchers, directed by Ishana Night Shyamalan. In 2025, she starred in the horror thriller Influencers, directed by Kurtis David Harder.

In 2026, she starred in the horror thriller Psycho Killer, directed by Gavin Polone; and in the comedy-horror Cold Storage, directed by Jonny Campbell. She will next star in the horror thriller The Shepherd, directed by John Hyams. and in Blackmere, a four-part detective series for Netflix created by Charlie Brooker.

Campbell has been dubbed a "scream queen" by various media publications due to her frequent starring roles in horror films.

== Personal life ==
Since 2019, Campbell has been in a relationship with American filmmaker Dawson Taylor, who directed her in the horror short film Otherkin (2022).

== Filmography ==
=== Film ===
Key
†	Denotes films that have not yet been released

Year	Title	Role	Notes
2017	The Ministry of Stories Anthology of Horror	Medusa	Short film
2017	King Arthur: Legend of the Sword	Kay	
2017	Canned	Georgie	Short film
2021	Wildcat	Khadija "Kat" Young	
2021	Blank Shores	Emily	Short film
2021	All My Friends Hate Me	Fig	
2022	Barbarian	Tess Marshall	
2022	Otherkin	Scarlet	Short film
2023	Bird Box Barcelona	Claire	
2023	T.I.M.	Abi	
2023	Lovely, Dark, and Deep	Lennon	
2024	The Watchers	Ciara	
2025	Influencers	Charlotte	
2026	Cold Storage	Naomi Williams	
2026	Psycho Killer	Officer Jane Archer	
2026	The Shepherd †		Filming

=== Television ===
Year	Title	Role	Notes	Ref.
2010	Casualty	Amy	Episode: "Dark Places"	
2010	The Cut	Kelly	2 episodes	
2011–2012	Sadie J	Whitney Landon	Recurring; 6 episodes	
2012	Doctors	Abby Hellier	Episode: "Crocodile Tears"	
2012	One Night	Rochelle	Miniseries	
2012	Holby City	Gabby Greendale	Episode: "Last Day on Earth"	
2013	Death in Paradise	Therese	Episode: "An Unholy Death"	
2013	The Ice Cream Girls	Young Serena Gorringe	Miniseries	
2014	The Dumping Ground	Jen	Episode: "Finding Frank"	
2014	Murdered by My Boyfriend	Ashley Jones	Television film	
2015	The Ark	Aris	Television film	
2015	Brotherhood	Katherine	Episode: "Mating"	
2015	After Hours	Jasmine	6 episodes	
2015	Tripped	Kate	Miniseries	
2016	One of Us	Anna	Miniseries	
2016	Flowers	Abigail	6 episodes	
2017	Broadchurch	Detective Constable Katie Harford	8 episodes	
2017	Philip K. Dick's Electric Dreams	Barbara	Episode: "Impossible Planet"	
2017	five by five	Chloe	2 episodes	
2017	Black Mirror	Amy	Episode: "Hang the DJ"	
2018	Krypton	Lyta Zod	Main role	
2019	His Dark Materials	Adele Starminster	Episode: "The Idea of North"	
2019	Cake	Paige	3 episodes	
2020	The Pale Horse	Delphine Easterbrook	Main role; miniseries	
2020	Soulmates	Miranda	Episode: "Little Adventures"	
2022	Suspicion	Natalie Thompson	Main role	
TBA	Blackmere †		In production	

=== Web ===
Year	Title	Role	Notes
2009	Freak	Lucy	Main role; 16 episodes

== Awards and nominations ==
Year	Award	Category	Work	Result	Ref.
2015	RTS Programme Awards	Actor – Female	Murdered by My Boyfriend	Nominated	
2015	British Academy Television Awards	Best Actress	Murdered by My Boyfriend	Won	
2018	Black Reel Awards	Outstanding Actress, TV Movie or Limited Series	Black Mirror	Nominated	
