= Philanthropreneur =

Term for an entrepreneur and philanthropist

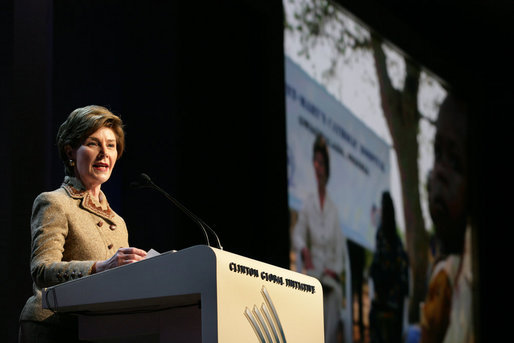
Laura Bush announcing partnership with Case Foundation to support the provision and installations of PlayPump water systems – Roundabout Playpumps

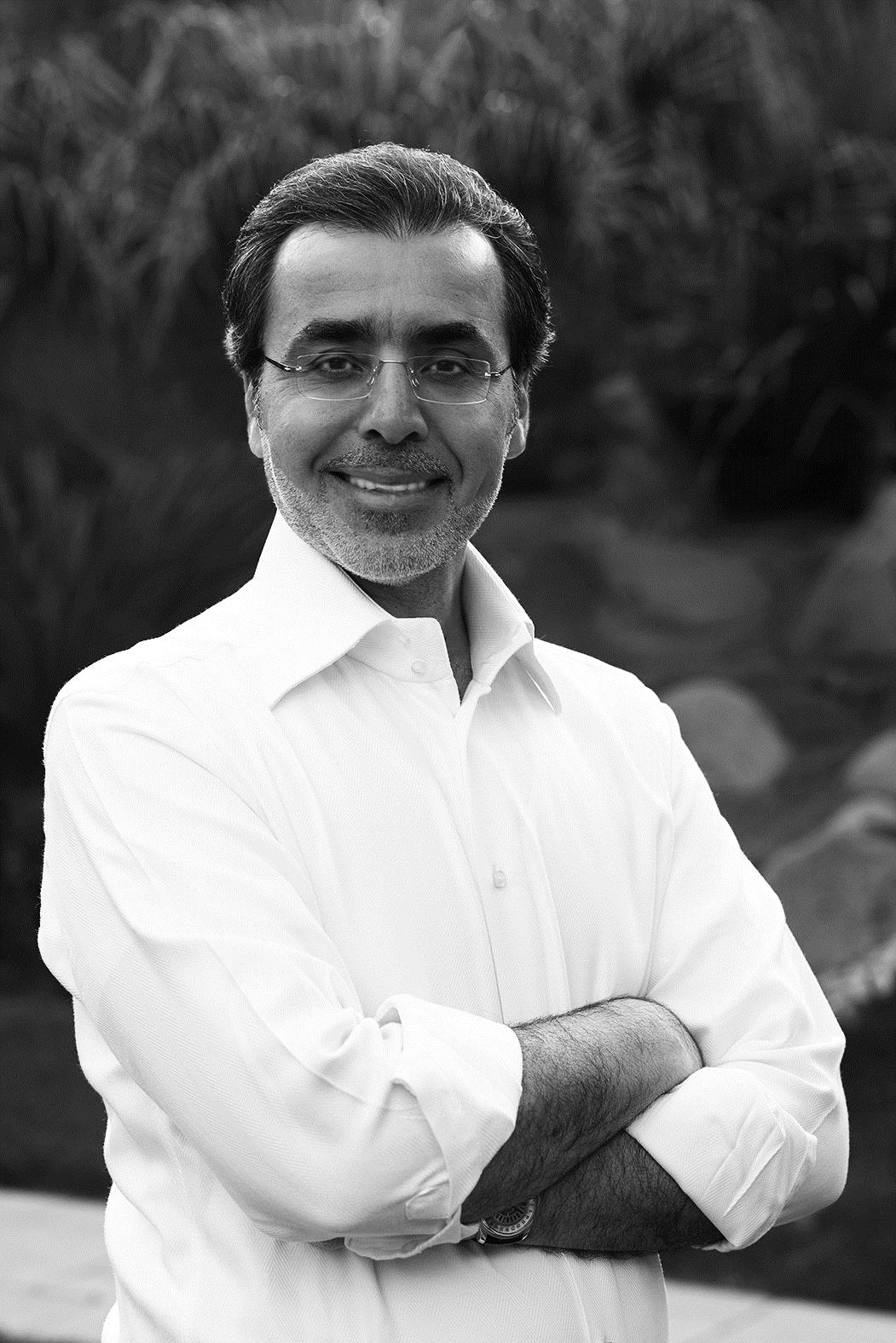
Amr Al-Dabbagh, Saudi philanthropreneur, businessman, former government minister, and founder of the Stars Foundation

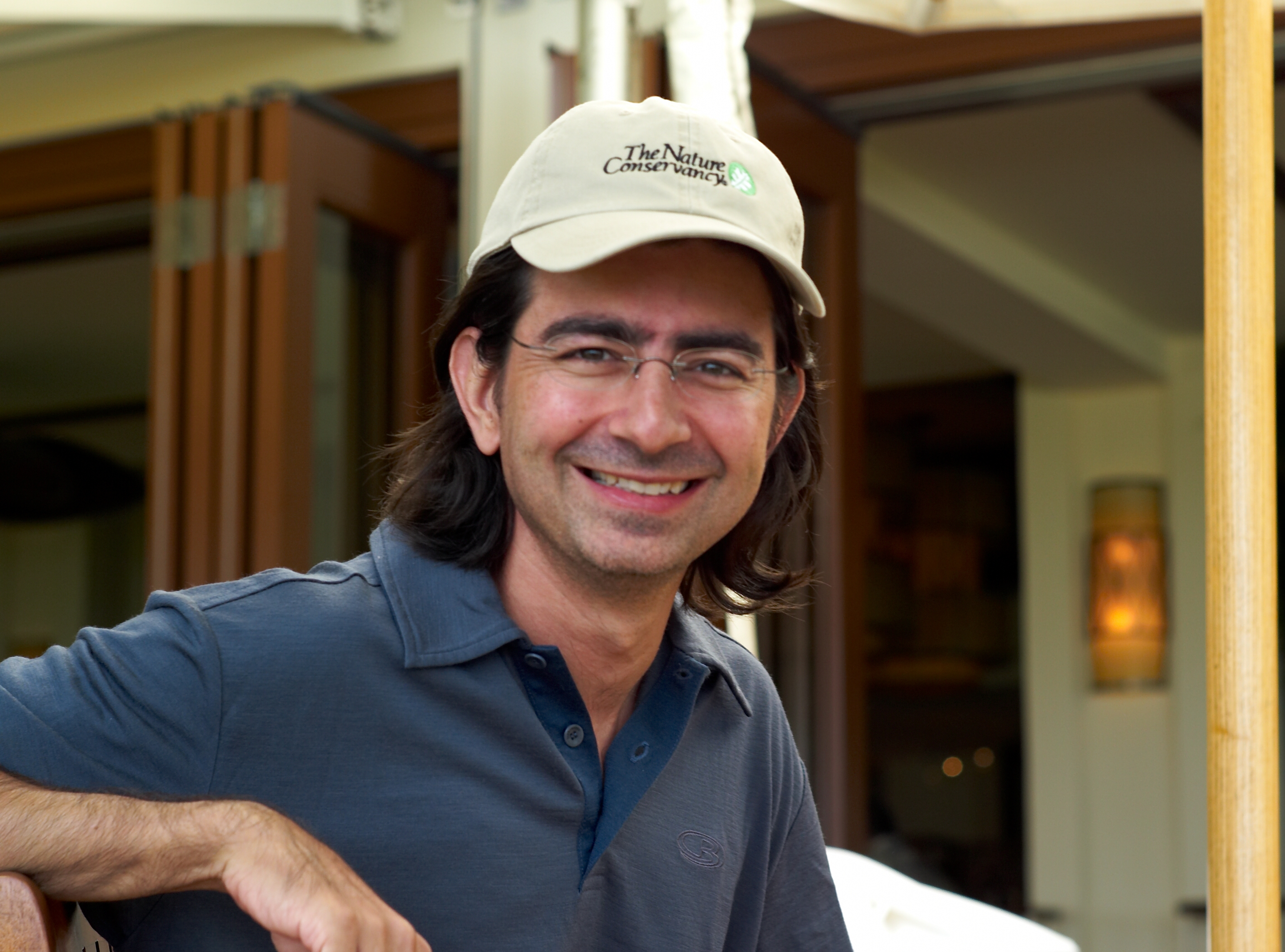
Pierre Omidyar, French-born American philanthropreneur and founder of the Omidyar Foundation. He is the founder and former chairman of eBay

A philanthropreneur, also known as a philanthro-capitalist, is a portmanteau of entrepreneur and philanthropy. The Wall Street Journal used the term in a 1999 article, while a publication titled The Philanthropreneur Newsletter existed as early as 1997. Philanthropreneurship is often described as a model of philanthropy that incorporates business practices into charitable activities.

The core objective of philanthropreneurship is to increase the philanthropic impact of nonprofit organizations through the use of corporations. Traditionally, nonprofit organizations solely depended on donations, grants, or other forms of charitable giving. Philanthropreneurship differs by investing rather than donating; there is an expectation of financial profit in addition to the social impact traditionally associated with nonprofit organizations. Philanthropreneurs generally seek to support projects or organizations intended to produce measurable social outcomes while also generating financial returns.

== Description ==
Philanthropreneurs typically describe their activities as attempts to address social or economic problems while also earning financial returns. Philanthropreneurs are often "driven to do good and have their profit, too," as Stephanie Strom wrote in an article for The New York Times.

== Theoretical Framework of Philanthropreneurship ==
As an emerging field, there is no defined operating model or strategic approach. However, philanthropreneurship marks the transition from a grant- and donation-based model to a profit model with predefined objectives and a constant focus on quantifiable results. This form of "commercial giving" demands a measurable return, so opportunities are assessed according to different criteria. Factors such as profitability and quantifiable performance are fixed requirements for granting support. The shift toward more business-minded professional management has also resulted in a greater focus on long-term goals.

The application of entrepreneurial practices in philanthropy enhances the impact of affiliated nonprofit organizations through strategic funding. Traditional philanthropy has generally relied on donations, grants, and charitable giving rather than revenue-generating investment models. Philanthropreneurship differs from traditional nonprofit models by emphasizing revenue-generating activities alongside charitable or social-impact goals. In philanthropreneurship, successful ventures require the establishment of recurring income to avoid the depletion of funds and ultimately prevent the organization's dissolution.

Philanthropic buying has a limited reach, so philanthropreneurs do not dispose of surplus funds but instead tailor investments by actively leveraging their advantages, such as wealth, time, business expertise, networks, and reputation. Philanthropreneurship is measured in terms of impact, sustainability, and scalability.

Philanthropreneurs include Bill Gates and Melinda French Gates, Steve Case, Pierre Omidyar, and Bill Clinton. Philanthropreneurship is now supported by emerging business models and legislation, including low-profit limited liability companies (L3Cs), which were created by tax attorney Marc J. Lane.

== Controversies ==
Nonprofit organizations have historically found it challenging to trust and accept the concept of "philanthro-capitalism". Critics note that many metrics of the commercial sector, such as return on investment, lack applicability to nonprofit organizations. Moreover, the inclusion of commercial and enterprise strategies has generated concerns about maintaining the institution's culture and ideology. A particular concern is the risk that the organization's focus will shift away from the social mission and instead toward satisfying the need for profit.

The performance assessment of philanthropreneurial ventures remains an area of concern for many, as there is no precise measure of social impact. For example, in "impact investing", a core practice of philanthropreneurship, project selection for funding is based on estimated social impact and financial return. From an ethical perspective, many critics argue that the incorporation of a business model commercializes the nonprofit sector and further increases the risk of distorting the organization's mission and principles, thereby alienating the very people it would help.

Conversely, many supporters point out that traditional philanthropy alone cannot sustain social initiatives because of the shortage of funding sources. Some advocates of philanthro-capitalism argue that reliance on donations and traditional fundraising can make nonprofit organizations financially unstable and that diversified revenue streams may improve long-term sustainability.

== Practitioners of philanthropreneurship ==
- Amr Al-Dabbagh
- Steve Case
- Bill Clinton
- Bill and Melinda Gates Foundation
- Pierre Omidyar

== See also ==
- Social entrepreneurship
- Mutual Aid
- Capitalism
- Social Work
- Impact Investing
