= Isabela Boscov =

Brazilian film critic

- Born: São Paulo, Brazil
- Education: School of Communications and Arts, University of São Paulo
- Occupations: Film critic; YouTuber

YouTube information
- Channel: Isabela Boscov
- Subscribers: 1.04 million
- Views: 94.5 million
- Last updated: July 10, 2025

Isabela Gimenez Boscov is a Brazilian journalist and YouTuber specialised in film criticism. She gained notoriety in Brazil after her witty critics became memes on social media.

== Career ==
Boscov graduated in Radio and Television from the School of Communications and Arts of the University of São Paulo (ECA-USP), she began her career at Jornal da Tarde. She also worked at Brazil's biggest newspaper of record, Folha de S.Paulo, and as editor-in-chief at the SET magazine, specialised in cinema, where she remained until 1999, the year she arrived at Veja, where she was executive editor and responsible for the cinema area until 2015.

In 2015, she started a YouTube channel and a blog with designer Guiherme Gouveia and producer Whoopsy Daisy, where she published reviews and interviews and continued his collaboration with Veja, which ended afterwards. Throughout her career, Boscov has personally interviewed film celebrities such as Steven Spielberg, Harrison Ford, Mickey Rourke, Quentin Tarantino, Tim Roth, Clint Eastwood, George Lucas, and others.

In 2021, the way she presents her reviews gained repercussions on social media, with the creation of memes made by users, in addition to the "Acervo Boscov" ("Boscov Collection"), a Twitter profile that reproduces excerpts from her reviews. In April 2022, this led to Boscov's participation in an Avon advertisement, in which some of the lines that became memes from her reviews published on YouTube were used. On June 5, 2022, Isabela Boscov commented on G1 that the predominant age group of the audience that watched her videos on YouTube was over 30 years old, and after the repercussion of the memes, there was an increase in the audience of 14–25 years old.

She also ventured into Letterboxd, where she publishes film critics she has been writing since 1983.
