= Nathan Barley =

British television series

- Cover of the DVD release
- Genre: Sitcom
- Created by: Chris Morris; Charlie Brooker
- Written by: Chris Morris; Charlie Brooker
- Starring: Julian Barratt; Nicholas Burns; Claire Keelan; Richard Ayoade; Rhys Thomas; Ben Whishaw
- Country of origin: United Kingdom
- Original language: English
- No. of series: 1
- No. of episodes: 6

Production
- Running time: 26 minutes
- Production company: Talkback

Original release
- Network: Channel 4
- Release: 11 February – 18 March 2005

Nathan Barley is a British Channel 4 television sitcom written by Charlie Brooker and Chris Morris, directed by Morris and starring Nicholas Burns, Julian Barratt, Claire Keelan, Richard Ayoade, Ben Whishaw, Rhys Thomas and Charlie Condou. The series of six weekly episodes began broadcasting on 11 February 2005 on Channel 4. Described by his creator as a "meaningless strutting cadaver-in-waiting", the character originated on Brooker's TVGoHome – a website parodying television listings – as the focus of a fly-on-the-wall documentary called Cunt.

== Plot ==
Nathan Barley, played by Nicholas Burns, is a webmaster, guerrilla filmmaker, screenwriter, DJ and in his own words, a "self-facilitating media node". Whilst desperate to convince himself and others that he is the epitome of urban cool, Nathan is secretly terrified he might not be, which is why he reads Sugar Ape magazine, his bible of cool. Sugar Ape has been described as a spoof of Dazed & Confused and Vice, although Brooker has stated that "the Sugar Ape "Vice" issue from Ep5 wasn't an assault on Vice magazine – I think it just (understandably) ended up looking that way".

The website consists of pranks caught on camera, artwork which clumsily satirises contemporary politics, photos of him with attractive women and famous figures (some of them digitally edited to insert himself), and photos of him standing on street corners in major cities around the world.

The humour derives from the rapid rise of both the Internet and digital media, and the assumption by publishers and broadcasters that almost any such work is worthy of attention. Barley and his peers are often hired ahead of actual journalists and talented writers trying to make intelligent points, such as the earnest documentary filmmaker Claire Ashcroft (Claire Keelan), and her brother Dan (Julian Barratt), the series' two other central characters. Claire seeks to highlight the plight of the inner city's homeless and drug-dependent; Dan is a jaded, opinionated and apathetic hack who, having written an article for Sugar Ape entitled "The Rise of the Idiots", is appalled to find that "the idiots" in question – Nathan and his contemporaries – have adopted him as their spiritual leader, failing to see that they are the very people he was criticising.

While Dan sees a clear distinction between himself and the "idiots", he's frequently forced to compromise his own ethics in order to earn a living, and seems to be fighting the dawning realisation that he may actually be the very thing he despises. At the same time, Claire, who clearly wants to see herself as socially responsible and philanthropic, is doggedly determined to further her own career.

Other recurring characters include Nathan's idiot flatmate Toby (Rhys Thomas) and the staff at Dan Ashcroft's magazine, Sugar Ape: asinine chief editor Jonatton Yeah? (Charlie Condou), Ned Smanks (Richard Ayoade) and Rufus Onslatt (Spencer Brown), a pair of gormless graphic designers, and receptionist Sasha (Nina Sosanya). Barley has an inoffensive young assistant called Pingu (Ben Whishaw). The eccentric and ludicrous Doug Rocket, founder member of The Veryphonics, and played by comedian David Hoyle (a spoof of Dave Stewart of Eurythmics), also appears in several episodes.

Dan Ashcroft's flatmate is a DJ called "Jones", who appears blissfully unaware of the antisocial cacophony he creates. Jones is played by Noel Fielding, Barratt's partner in comic duo the Mighty Boosh.

== Cast ==
- Nicholas Burns as Nathan Barley
- Julian Barratt as Dan Ashcroft
- Claire Keelan as Claire Ashcroft
- Richard Ayoade as Ned Smanks
- Ben Whishaw as Pingu
- Rhys Thomas as Toby
- Noel Fielding as Jones
- Spencer Brown as Rufus Onslatt
- Charlie Condou as Jonatton Yeah?
- David Hoyle as Doug Rocket
- Nina Sosanya as Sasha
- Kevin Eldon as Nikolai the Barber
- Julia Davis as Honda Poppet
- Benedict Cumberbatch as Robin

== Production ==
The working title for the series was Box of Slice.

=== Pilot ===
In the pilot of the show, characters are different from those in the actual series. The character of Claire already knows Nathan and Pingu instead of meeting them in the first episode of the series. The character of Dan is decidedly darker and gets one up on Nathan and the idiots more often. Ned Smanks and Rufus Onslatt do not appear in the pilot, but Spencer Brown does play a minor character in the art gallery scene. Jonattan Yeah? makes a brief appearance and is largely the same. The pilot was never transmitted, but was included as an extra on the DVD. Story elements and some scenes shot for the pilot were used in the third, fourth and fifth episodes of the series, where the familiarity between the characters, and Dan Ashcroft's darker nature, make greater sense in context.

=== Promotion ===
The series was promoted across the UK with billboards of Barley ostensibly advertising a fictitious mobile telephone, the Wasp T12 Speechtool ("it's well weapon"). This device was advertised as being exceptionally loud, with several hugely annoying ringtones, a giant key for the number 5 (allegedly the most commonly used digit), a powerful projector, a business card printer and miniature turntables for scratching MP3s. Barley's now-defunct website, www.trashbat.co.ck, served as an official site for the television series.

The DVD of the series was released in October 2005, featuring all six episodes, a number of extras (including the pilot), and a booklet written by Nathan featuring his artwork. The artwork in question is largely a parody of prolific graffiti artist Banksy by Shynola.

=== Potential second series ===
Though the show only aired for one series, in a 2017 interview, Julian Barratt says "We did do some work towards a second series back in the day. I think Nathan Barley was going to have a twin brother or something." Charlie Brooker commented in 2016 that the planned storyline for the second series "moved away from the style magazine", focusing on Barley's "financial support being cut off [...] He was left adrift in a world where things were crumbling, and he was less certain of things". However, those involved with the show were busy with other projects; Barratt opines that if the show were to return, "they would need to approach it differently" as "everything from it kind of came true".

== Reception ==
According to Digital Spy, Nathan Barley was "a flop when it originally aired, but a cult hit on DVD". It pulled in 700,000 viewers and a 3% share.

Reviews were generally favourable, though some criticised the show's jabs at the dotcom boom as lacking relevance, and believed that the portrayal and parody of the East London hipster was dated. However, the series is lauded today for predicting a future of memes, vloggers and hipsters, and the global influence of social media. Radio Times wrote "There are moments of Morris madness and it's a welcome comic oddity, though possibly one with limited appeal outside London's media maelstrom." The Telegraph described the title character as "so laughable he makes you want to cry".

In 2019, The Guardian ranked Nathan Barley at number 47 in their list of "The 100 best TV shows of the 21st century".

== Music ==
Music used in Nathan Barley includes "Einstein A Go-Go" by Landscape and "You Spin Me Round (Like a Record)" by Dead or Alive.

== See also ==
- Shoreditch Twat
- Poe's law
- TVGoHome
