= Robin Klein (venture capitalist) =

British entrepreneur (born 1947)

- Born: Johannesburg, South Africa
- Education: University of the Witwatersrand
- Occupation: Founding Partner at Local Globe
- Spouse: Hanna Klein
- Children: Saul Klein and Dr. Melanie Morris
- Relatives: Jonathan Klein (brother), co-founder and CEO of Getty Images; Martin Klein

Robin Klein (born December 1947) is a British entrepreneur and investor. He was until 2015 a venture partner at Index Ventures and co-founder of The Accelerator Group, an advisor and investor in early-stage companies. In April 2015, he and his son, Saul founded LocalGlobe, a seed stage venture capital firm.

== Early life and education ==
Klein was born in Johannesburg, South Africa. He received a bachelor's degree in electrical engineering, specialising in cybernetics, and a Master of Science degree from the University of the Witwatersrand, in Johannesburg, in 1969. He moved to the United Kingdom in 1976.

== Career ==
From 1991 to 1997, Klein was chairman and CEO of Innovations Group PLC, which conducted the first documented e-commerce transaction in the UK, in May 1995. Klein was managing director, marketing and home shopping, at Arcadia, from 1996 to 1999. Klein started his investing career in earnest in 1998, co-founding The Accelerator Group (TAG), a vehicle for investing in early-stage internet services, e-commerce and digital media businesses, with his son, Saul Klein.

From 2010 to 2015 Klein was a venture partner at Index Ventures. He ran Index Seed, Index Ventures' seed fund, in partnership with TAG.

In April 2015, Saul and Robin founded LocalGlobe, a Venture Capital Firm focusing on early stage (Seed) investment in Technology enabled businesses. They raised LocalGlobe 7, a fund of £45m by October 2015 and LocalGlobe 8, a £70m fund in March 2017.

Klein has been an early-stage investor in a number of companies, including Agent Provocateur (acquired by private equity firm 3i for £60m), Lastminute.com (acquired by Travelocity for £577m, Last.fm (acquired by CBS for $280 million, Dopplr (acquired by Nokia), LoveFilm (acquired by Amazon for $317 million), Sit Up TV (acquired by Virgin Media), SlideShare (acquired by Linkedin for $119 million), Fizzback (acquired by Nice Systems for $80 million), Mashery (acquired by Intel for $180 million), TweetDeck (acquired by Twitter for $40 million – $50 million), and Twitterfeed (acquired by Bitly). Klein is involved with OpenCoffee Club, a group his son Saul Klein started in 2007 to facilitate gatherings and networking among entrepreneurs, developers and investors and is an advisor to Seedcamp which he helped to launch in 2007. Klein is currently chairman of the board at moo.com, an online printing company; MyBuilder, an online marketplace bringing together consumers, builders and tradesmen; and Wonga, a digital finance company, named the number one company in the Sunday Times Tech Track 100. Klein is also a board member of EDITD, Farfetch, FreeAgent, Onefinestay, Skimlinks, and Zoopla, an investor and board observer at TransferWise, and a non-executive director at Moneysupermarket.com (LSE: MONY), and an investor in other companies.

From 2007 to 2010 Klein spent a day a week as venture partner at Atlas Venture, an early-stage technology and life sciences venture capital firm.

== Philanthropy and non-profit involvement ==
Klein was chairman of Great Ormond Street Hospital Promotions Ltd, the funding company for Great Ormond Street Hospital, a children's hospital in London, and was formerly on the Board of Trustees of the Jewish Community Centre for London which developed the JW3 community centre.
