= Shoreditch Twat =

London fanzine

The Shoreditch Twat fanzine was published and edited by club promoter Neil Boorman on behalf of the Shoreditch nightclub 333 between 1999 and 2004.

== History ==
Starting life as a listings magazine for the club, it quickly grew to become an irreverent, satirical fanzine at the centre of the creative boom in East London. Producing 25,000 copies every six weeks with funding from BAT, Anheuser-Busch and Diesel, Shoreditch Twat attracted writers from The Guardian, The Face, Arena, Loaded, ID and Sleazenation, and illustrators James Jarvis, Bump, Will Sweeney and Elliot Thoburn.

The Twat was art directed by Bump (Jon Morgan and Mike Watson), adding a surreal edge.

Hoxton resident Lida Hujic wrote:

"At the turn of the noughties, the satirical fanzine the Shoreditch Twat captured the moment when the organic Hoxton community began to be infiltrated by types whose intentions were dubious. The Shoreditch Twat distinguished between the genuine creatives who were drawn to the area in search of similarly minded people and the fakes - opportunists who wanted to cash in on this creative hub, or faux artistes pretending to be scruffy and yet having loads of money from their parents."

In 2001, the term Shoreditch Twat became popular vernacular for an overdressed East London 'trendy' and the fanzine went on to produce an installation for the Barbican Gallery's UK culture exhibition 'Jam', which later toured to Japan.

Channel 4 Television and Talkback commissioned Shoreditch Twat to produce a one-off comedy under the amended title of Shoreditch Tw*t, and shown in the Comedy Lab strand on 31 October 2002. This programme went on to win a special mention at the 2003 Montreux Comedy Award.

After four years and 31 issues, Shoreditch Twat ran into legal difficulties and was forced to close down. The publisher went on to edit Sleazenation Magazine.

== See also ==
- Nathan Barley
