= The Gadget Shop =

British electronic toy retailer

- Type: Retail chain
- Industry: Gadget shop
- Founded: 1991
- Defunct: 2005
- Headquarters: East Yorkshire
- Key people: Jonathan Elvidge (founder)
- Products: Gadgets, toys, lighting
- Owner: WHSmith

The Gadget Shop (stylised gadgetshop) was a national British high-street chain of stores, predominantly selling gadgets, toys and novelty products, it was founded by Jonathan Elvidge in 1991.

At its height, it was one of the leading UK novelty gadget retailers. The chain went into administration in 2005, and subsequently closed.

== History ==
Jonathan Elvidge founded the chain in 1991. The ideology behind the chain was that its target market would be a retail experience for teenagers and young adults, offering the sale of DVD players, audio and computer equipment, alongside novelty toys.

At its height, it had 45 branches across the UK, and employed around 700 people.

The chain collapsed into administration in April 2005, and closed. The closure came a month after rival gadget retailer, Must Have It (formerly The Discovery Store), collapsed following difficult Christmas trading, mainly due to various department and toy stores entering the gadget market. Its closure was due to a lack of agreement among owners.

== Legacy ==
In May 2005, The Entertainer purchased The Gadget Shop's assets. Whilst original plans of a high-street return did not come to fruition, The Entertainer maintained an e-commerce presence for the brand.

In September 2010, the current owner of the brand, retailer WHSmith, purchased The Gadget Shop's assets, and has since used the 'Gadget Shop' name on some of its own-brand products.

From 2015, WHSmith Australia used the 'Gadget Shop' trademark for small outlets at Brisbane Airport and Perth Airport which sold phone chargers and travel accessories. These closed in the early 2020s.
