= TVGoHome =

Parody website

TVGoHome was a website which parodied the television listings style of the British magazine Radio Times. It was produced fortnightly from 1999 to 2001, and sporadically until April 2003, by Charlie Brooker. The site now exists only in archive form. TVGoHome columns also appeared for a short time in Loaded magazine, sometimes edited.

The website gained a cult following, partly due to its tie-up with the technology newsletter Need To Know, and its use of strong language, surreal imagery and savage satire reminiscent of the work of Chris Morris. Morris contributed on occasion, under the pseudonym 'Sid Peach'. Regular targets for ridicule were the Daily Mail, Mick Hucknall of Simply Red, and the TV presenters Rowland Rivron and Nicky Campbell. TVGoHome's most consistent target, however, was fictional. Nathan Barley, an ex-public-school media wannabe living off his parents' wealth, had his life chronicled in a fly-on-the-wall documentary series (in the TVGoHome universe) entitled simply 'Cunt'. Detailing Barley's comfortable life in the now gentrified area of formerly working class Westbourne Grove in west London, the programme essentially mocked the "new media" scene and its population of self-obsessed, middle-class web designers, DJs and magazine producers, their obsessions with absurd fashions and gadgetry, their inevitably feeble and derivative attempts at creativity, and their tireless efforts to embody the cutting edge of urban cool. A spinoff book of the same title was later released featuring old and new material.

Thanks to word-of-mouth, the website by 2001 had some 400,000 visits.

Brooker cited the increasing absurdity of television as one of the reasons he stopped writing TVGoHome. The ideas for real life shows such as Touch the Truck, in which contestants must continually touch a truck for 24 hours in order to win the truck as a prize, were the kind of idea that at one point would only have existed as an absurd satirical creation of Brooker's website. Now that they were becoming a reality, Brooker felt it was time to stop. In 2006, Brooker began a regular column in The Guardian, featuring new TVGoHome listings.

== Recurring programmes ==
- Cunt, a fly-on-the wall series featuring Nathan Barley, a "new media" type kept housed and up to date with the latest pointless technological gadgets through constant parental financial support. Barley is depicted as being of absolutely no value to society, with no morals and even less intelligence, and having many friends (all of whom are exactly like him). On one occasion he attempts to let his girlfriend down over a 6-month period, ultimately ending in his once confident, happy girlfriend being sectioned. He is subject to almost pathological levels of hatred from the writer of the billing of the show.
- Daily Mail Island, a reality TV show where several normal people are deposited on an island and not allowed access to any media other than the right-wing, strongly conservative Daily Mail newspaper, leading to them becoming progressively more irrational and brutal as the series progresses — for example, tying teenage lovers together with sacks on their heads and beating them, or sealing a teenager caught masturbating into a coffin filled with broken glass and dog faeces and throwing it over a cliff — and their language devolving into rhetorical questions and sarcastic snorts.
- Get Hen!, a bizarre interactive programme in which home viewers fire lightguns at a dancing hen inserted into various pieces of film.
- Mick Hucknall's Pink Pancakes, in which Mick Hucknall of Simply Red fame presses his testicles against various transparent surfaces, including shop windows, glass coffee tables and Chinese riot shields. Briefly succeeded by Mick Hucknall's Spud Tip Challenge, in which he quite simply balanced a baby new potato on the end of his penis.
- Ricky's Luck, a drama featuring Ricky Butcher encountering appallingly bad luck in just about everything he does. The title is also likely a play on Tucker's Luck, a spin-off of the children's series Grange Hill.
- Patrick Kielty's Streets of Fundom, where Patrick Kielty performs various completely meaningless actions while roaming the streets of Britain, such as wearing a Viking helmet, climbing onto the back of a man dressed as a cartoon Hitler and then letting off party poppers each time he passes an elderly woman.

== Television ==
The TVGoHome format itself, or elements derived from it, have featured within several television comedy and entertainment programmes.

A TVGoHome comedy sketch show was produced in 2001, consisting of six half-hour episodes broadcast on E4, later compiled into a smaller number of 'highlights' shows for broadcast on Channel 4. It was written by Brooker, among others, and directed by Tristram Shapeero, who also directed the controversial Brass Eye special on paedophilia. The sketches included new material and skits based on previous TVGH entries. The first episode aired on 28 November. Some programmes were new to the series, including the youth programme Scorch, but some were adaptations of existing programmes from the listings, such as The Flailers, a children's series, and Daily Mail Island.

A spin-off from TVGH was Unnovations, based on a parody of the Innovations catalogue; this was turned into a TV sketch/sitcom series, broadcast on UK Play in 2001-02; since that channel's demise, it has not been repeated.

A sitcom entitled Nathan Barley, based on a character first featured within TVGoHome columns, was co-written by Brooker with Chris Morris, and was broadcast in February 2005.

Brooker's 2009 Channel 4 TV-themed panel review show You Have Been Watching features TVGH-style spoof listings pages in its opening title sequence.

== Publications ==
- TV Go Home, Charlie Brooker, 2001 (ISBN 1-84115-675-2)
