= Annabel Jones =

Welsh television producer

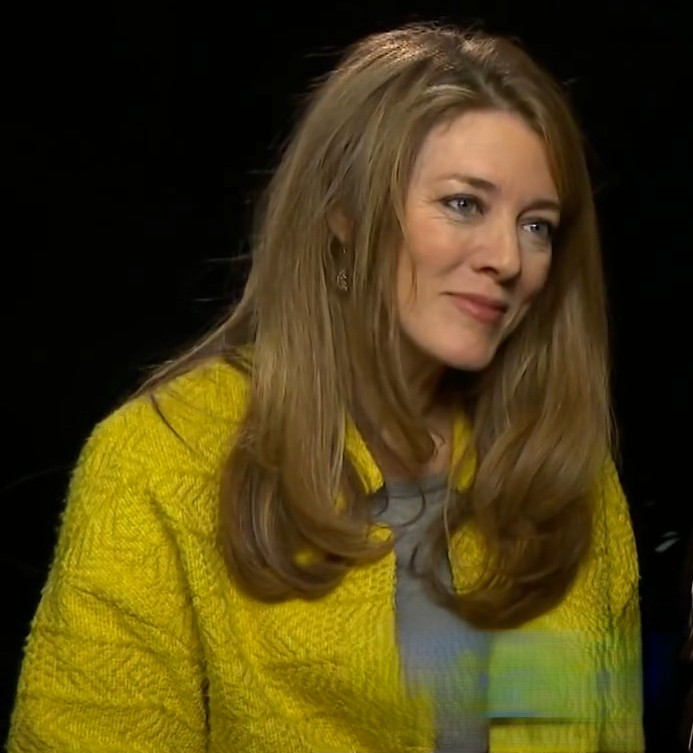
- Jones in 2017
- Born: January 1972 (age 54); Milford Haven, Wales
- Education: London School of Economics
- Occupation: Producer
- Years active: 2006–present

Annabel Jones (born January 1972) is a Welsh television producer, best known for producing Black Mirror with Charlie Brooker. She is a co-writer of the 2018 book Inside Black Mirror, with Brooker and Jason Arnopp. Jones is co-founder of the production company Broke and Bones, alongside Brooker.

== Early life ==
Jones was born in Haverfordwest, Wales January 1972 and grew up in Milford Haven, Wales. She began studying developmental economics at the London School of Economics in 1990. After graduating in 1994, she worked for television production companies in Soho, London.

== Career ==
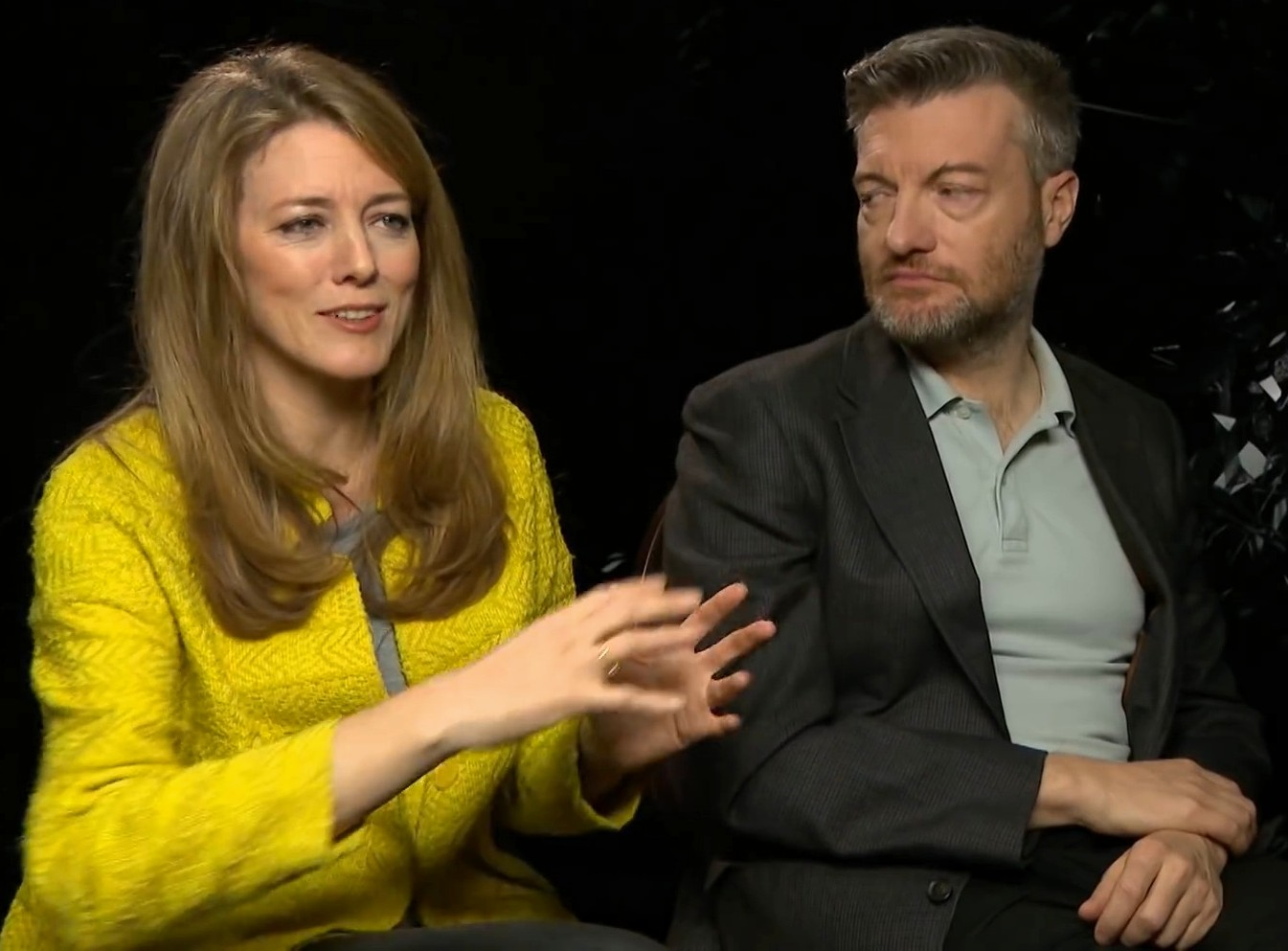
Jones and Charlie Brooker in 2017

Jones became an executive at the production company Endemol. She began working with Charlie Brooker at the production company Zeppotron, owned by Endemol, on five series of Charlie Brooker's Screenwipe (2006–2008), the first two series of the science fiction anthology series Black Mirror (2011 and 2013) and the satirical police procedural A Touch of Cloth (2012–2014). Jones and Brooker founded the Endemol Shine production company House of Tomorrow in 2014, Jones serving as managing director. It had a revenue of £31.2 million in 2018. Jones and Brooker quit the label House of Tomorrow in January 2020, founding the production company Broke and Bones in February 2020. The pair each have a 50% share in the company.

== Filmography ==
Title	Year	Executive producer	Notes
Charlie Brooker's Screenwipe	2006–2008	No	Program consultant
Dead Set	2008	Yes	
Charlie Brooker's Gameswipe	2009	Yes	
Newswipe with Charlie Brooker	2009–2010	Yes	
Charlie Brooker's 2010 Wipe	2010	Yes	
How TV Ruined Your Life	2011	Yes	
Charlie Brooker's 2011 Wipe	2011	Yes	
Black Mirror	2011–2019	Yes	
Charlie Brooker's 2012 Wipe	2012	Yes	
A Touch of Cloth	2012–2014	Yes	
How Videogames Changed the World	2013	Yes	
Charlie Brooker's 2013 Wipe	2013	Yes	
Charlie Brooker's Weekly Wipe	2013–2015	Yes	
Charlie Brooker's 2014 Wipe	2014	Yes	
Charlie Brooker's Election Wipe	2015	Yes	
Charlie Brooker's 2015 Wipe	2015	Yes	
Cunk on Shakespeare	2016	Yes	
Charlie Brooker's 2016 Wipe	2016	Yes	
Cunk on Christmas	2016	Yes	
Cunk on Britain	2017	Yes	
Cunk and Other Humans on 2019	2019	Yes	
Charlie Brooker's Antiviral Wipe	2020	Yes	
Death to 2020	2020	Yes	Also co-creator
Attack of the Hollywood Cliches!	2021	Yes	
Death to 2021	2021	Yes	Also co-creator
Cat Burglar	2022	Yes	
Toxic Town	2025	Yes	

== Awards and nominations ==
In 2017, Jones won a Primetime Emmy Award for the Black Mirror episode "San Junipero" and in 2018, won another for the episode "USS Callister". Alongside other individuals associated with the series, Jones was credited in the programme's nomination for the 2018 Black Reel Award for Outstanding Television Movie or Limited Series and the 2017 nomination and 2018 awarding of the Producers Guild of America Award for Best Long-Form Television.

=== Awards ===
Title	Year	Award	Work
BAFTA Cymru	2022	Siân Phillips Award	
Broadcasting Press Guild	2019	Innovation in Broadcasting Award	Black Mirror: Bandersnatch
Primetime Emmy	2019	Outstanding Television Movie	Black Mirror: Bandersnatch
Primetime Emmy	2019	Outstanding Creative Achievement in Interactive Media Within a Scripted Program	Black Mirror: Bandersnatch
Royal Television Society	2018	Judges' Award	Black Mirror
Primetime Emmy	2018	Outstanding Television Movie	Black Mirror: "USS Callister"
Broadcast Award	2018	Best Single Drama	Black Mirror: "San Junipero"
Producers Guild of America	2018	Outstanding Producer of Streamed or TV	Black Mirror: "San Junipero"
Primetime Emmy	2017	Outstanding Television Movie	Black Mirror: "San Junipero"
BAFTA	2017	Comedy and Comedy Entertainment	Charlie Brooker's 2016 Wipe
Peabody	2014	Entertainment	Black Mirror: Series 2
Broadcast Award	2014	Best Comedy	A Touch of Cloth Part II
International Emmy	2012	Best TV Mini-Series	Black Mirror: Series 1
Rose d'Or	2012	Best Comedy	Black Mirror: "The National Anthem"
British Comedy Awards	2010	Comedy Entertainment	Charlie Brooker's Newswipe
Royal Television Society	2009	Best Entertainment	Charlie Brooker's Newswipe
C21 International Drama	2019	Best TV Movie	Black Mirror: "USS Callister"
C21 International Drama	2018	Best TV Movie	Black Mirror: "San Junipero"

=== Nominations ===
Title	Year	Award	Work
BAFTA	2021	Comedy Entertainment	Charlie Brooker's Antiviral Wipe
Producers Guild of America	2020	Innovation in Broadcasting Award	Black Mirror: Bandersnatch
Producers Guild of America	2020	Outstanding Producer of Streamed or TV	Black Mirror: "Striking Vipers"
BAFTA	2019	Best Single Drama	Black Mirror: Bandersnatch
BAFTA	2018	Best Single Drama	Black Mirror: "Hang The DJ"
Rose d'Or	2018	Best Limited Series	Black Mirror: Series 4
Rose d'Or	2018	Best Comedy	Cunk on Britain
Producers Guild of America	2017	Outstanding Producer of Streamed or TV	Black Mirror: Series 4
BAFTA	2017	Best Comedy and Comedy Entertainment	Cunk on Shakespeare
Broadcast Award	2016	Best Single Drama	Black Mirror: "White Christmas"
Royal Television Society	2016	Best Single Drama	Black Mirror: "White Christmas"
BAFTA	2016	Comedy and Comedy Entertainment	Charlie Brooker's Election Wipe
BAFTA	2015	Comedy and Comedy Entertainment	Charlie Brooker's Weekly Wipe
BAFTA	2014	Best Single Drama	Black Mirror: "Be Right Back"
Royal Television Society	2014	Best Scripted Comedy	A Touch of Cloth Part II
Broadcast Award	2013	Best Single Drama	Black Mirror: "The National Anthem"
BAFTA	2009	Best Entertainment	Charlie Brooker's Newswipe
BAFTA	2008	Best Drama Serial	Dead Set

== Personal life ==
Jones is a vegetarian.
