= List of Charlie Brooker's Screenwipe episodes =

Charlie Brooker's Screenwipe is a British television review programme broadcast on BBC Four written and presented by Charlie Brooker. The programme contains reviews of current shows, as well as stories and commentary on how television is produced. Series one was referred to by Brooker as a "series of three pilots", after which the programme was commissioned for a longer run. The series has run for five series, plus several specials on BBC Four, although repeats have been shown on BBC Two.

== Episodes ==
=== Series 1 ===
Total	Series	Episode	Original airdate
1	1	1	2 March 2006
Brooker talks about the actual cost of making simple TV and how TV companies claw the money back from phone in shows. He also discusses the different types of TV presenters as well as reviewing The Jeremy Kyle Show and The Apprentice. Robert Popper talks about his dislike for the TV show Star Quality.
2	1	2	9 March 2006
Brooker talks about the process of actually getting an idea onto TV. He reviews 24, Deal or No Deal and breakfast TV and he discusses TV giving itself a pat on the back. Dr Ben Goldacre discusses "bad" science on television.
3	1	3	16 March 2006
Brooker discusses TV scaremongering thanks to 24-hour news and reconstruction programmes. He reviews Music channels and TV makeover shows. Simon Farnaby talks about Last of the Summer Wine.

=== Series 2 ===
Total	Series	Episode	Original airdate
4	2	1	20 July 2006
Brooker talks about how difficult it is to actually make the smallest bit of TV. Brooker reviews the morning slots on television, Doctor Who, EastEnders and aspirational TV. Jamie Whyte talks about advertising on TV.
5	2	2	27 July 2006
Brooker discusses why some people want to be famous and will do anything to get on TV. He reviews psychic and medium programmes, Big Brother and Love Island. David Quantick discusses his gripes with "list" shows.
6	2	3	3 August 2006
Brooker looks into sex on television. He reviews where TV is heading in the future and where it is now, Emmerdale, cookery shows and Deadwood. Catherine Townsend talks about unrealistic sex on television.
7	2	4	10 August 2006
Brooker goes in depth into how you can get an idea on TV. He reviews TV consumer shows, Hollyoaks and Dragons' Den. A spoof voice commentary from the director of The Mint is supplied (by Adam Buxton).
8	2	5	17 August 2006
Screenwipe USA. In this USA special, Brooker goes in depth into American TV and compares the main differences between British and American Television. He reviews American soap operas, American reality crime shows, To Catch a Predator and The Wire. Lewis Black talks about his experiences with television.

=== 2006 Christmas specials ===
Series	Episode	Original airdate
Special		21 December 2006
A Very Screenwipe Christmas. In this Christmas special, Brooker talks about Christmas television from past to present. He reviews Noel Edmonds' Christmas shows, Christmas EastEnders and primetime Christmas Day TV. Rhys Thomas talks about The Box of Delights.
Special		31 December 2006
Review of the Year 2006. In this end of year special, Brooker looks back at TV from the year gone by. He reviews shows that tell us how to live, broadcasting landmarks, reality TV and TV comebacks. Grace Dent reviews Britain's soap operas. Mark Gatiss talks about Nigel Kneale who died during the year.

=== Series 3 ===
Total	Series	Episode	Original airdate
9	3	1	5 February 2007
Brooker talks about the guidelines that TV has to adhere to. He reviews Celebrity Big Brother 5, Psychic Private Eyes and Battlestar Galactica. Doug Stanhope gives his views on television.
10	3	2	12 February 2007
Brooker discusses what TV ratings are and how they work. He reviews 24, video games not getting as much respect as television and Fortune: Million Pound Giveaway. Gia Milinovich talks about video on the web.
11	3	3	19 February 2007
Brooker discusses what it's like to be the "talent" on a TV show. He reviews shows aimed at men; Ross Kemp on Gangs, Top Gear and Britain's Hardest. He also reviews courtroom reality show The Verdict. Reginald D Hunter talks about British TV from an American perspective.
12	3	4	26 February 2007
Brooker talks about how video and editing techniques and technology have improved over time. He reviews Primeval and The Sex Inspectors. Stewart Lee talks about how the perception of teenagers on TV has changed over the years. Grace Dent talks about love storylines in soap operas.

=== Series 4 ===
Total	Series	Episode	Original airdate
N/A	Special		18 September 2007
'How to' compilation show. In this Compilation show Brooker looks back at the actual cost of making television, how to get your ideas on TV, how the smallest piece of TV is difficult to make, what it's like being the "talent" on a TV show and how videoing and editing techniques have improved over time
13	4	1	25 September 2007
Brooker looks into the lies TV tells us. He reviews Heroes, Have I Been Here Before? and The X Factor. Nicholas Parsons talks about Saturday night entertainment.
14	4	2	2 October 2007
Brooker talks about the decline of the ending credits on TV programmes. He reviews Ann Widdecombe Versus Prostitution, Secret Diary of a Call Girl and Street Doctor. Richard Herring talks about Big Cook, Little Cook.
15	4	3	9 October 2007
In this television news special, Brooker talks about the need to entertain on the news and also the rise of 24-hour news. Adam Curtis talks about the rise and fall of the television journalist.
16	4	4	16 October 2007
Brooker talks about television that is aimed at today's youth. He reviews My Super Sweet 16, America's Next Top Model and The Tudors. Matt Berry about television theme tunes, especially those of Ronnie Hazelhurst.
17	4	5	23 October 2007
Brooker looks into TV elimination shows and he creates his own to demonstrate how they can be edited to distort the truth. He reviews Pete's P.A. and Any Dream Will Do.
N/A	Special		19 December 2007
Review of the year 2007. In this end of year special, Brooker looks back at TV from the year gone by. He reviews show highlights from the year month by month. Grace Dent reviews Britain's soap operas.

=== Series 5 ===
Total	Series	Episode	Original airdate
18	5	1	18 November 2008
Brooker discusses the notion of people complaining about television. He reviews Britannia High, Paul Ross's Big Black Book of Horror. Liza Tarbuck talks about Tales of the Riverbank.
19	5	2	25 November 2008
Brooker talks about television advertising; the guidelines, its history and how they work. He reviews Mad Men. Tim Key recites another poem.
20	5	3	2 December 2008
In this slightly extended episode, Brooker is joined by some of the best TV writers in the business today. They talk about how they started out and how they go about writing a television show. Featured in this episode are; Russell T Davies, Paul Abbott, Jesse Armstrong, Sam Bain, Graham Linehan and Tony Jordan.
21	5	4	9 December 2008
Brooker talks the about the change in direction that modern day documentaries have taken. He launches his own mission documentary; "Konnie's Great British Wee", fronted by Konnie Huq. Brooker reviews Miss Naked Beauty, Jamie's Ministry of Food and The Great British Body.
22	5	5	16 December 2008
Brooker focuses on children's television from past to present, and even has a go at being a children's TV presenter on Toonattik. He reviews Johnny Ball Games, In the Night Garden..., Yo Gabba Gabba! and LazyTown. Kirsten O'Brien talks about ChuckleVision and Andy Nyman talks about The Junior Christian Science Bible Lesson. The end of the episode includes a tribute to Bagpuss creator Oliver Postgate who had died the previous week.
	Special		24 December 2008
Review of the year 2008. In this end of year special, Brooker looks back at TV from the year gone by. He reviews show highlights from the year month by month.

=== 2009 Review of the Year ===
Series	Episode	Original airdate
Special		22 December 2009
Month by month, Charlie Brooker analyses and mocks television shows from 2009. Among the many programmes reviewed are Noel's HQ, Britain's Got Talent, Extreme Male Beauty, Big Brother, Torchwood: Children of Earth, Inside Nature's Giants, Live From Studio Five, Fearne and... Peaches Geldof, The Execution of Gary Glitter, I'm a Celebrity...Get Me Out of Here! and The X Factor. He also shows a montage of people fainting on television and discusses coverage of the death of Michael Jackson; Barry Shitpeas talks about Nick Griffin's appearance on Question Time.

=== 2010 Wipe ===
Series	Episode	Original airdate
Special		27 December 2010
Brooker comments on television, news and other media from 2010, in chronological order. Discussed in depth are the 2010 UK general election and its consequences, as well as television and newspaper coverage of the 2010 Northumbria Police manhunt. Brooker also satirises the news media's coverage of snow and the 2010 Haiti earthquake, Tiger Woods' indeflity, musical shows such as Pineapple Dance Studios and Over the Rainbow, Inception, global coverage of Mary Bale putting a cat in a bin, The Apprentice, The Only Way Is Essex and the 2010 Copiapó mining accident. Barry Shitpeas reviews Downton Abbey, Daybreak and The X Factor; Grace Dent covers EastEnders Live; Doug Stanhope talks about the media reaction to the Deepwater Horizon oil spill.

=== 2011 Wipe ===
Series	Episode	Original airdate
Special		30 December 2011
Review of the year 2011. Brooker takes a look back at the past 12 months of television and media.

=== 2012 Wipe ===
Series	Episode	Original airdate
Special		1 January 2013
Charlie Brooker, Philomena Cunk (Diane Morgan), Barry Shitpeas and Doug Stanhope review media from the last 12 months. Under discussion are the Costa Concordia, The Artist, THe Voice UK, panic buying in the UK, Fifty Shades of Grey, Kony 2012, advertisements, the Grand National, Baggage and other Channel 4 shows, Jimmy Carr's tax avoidance, the Diamond Jubilee of Queen Elizabeth II, "Gangnam Style", Superstar, the London Olympics and Paralympics, the British press and Leveson Inquiry, Innocence of Muslims, The Dark Knight Rises, Plebgate, the Jimmy Savile sexual abuse scandal, the 2012 presidential elections in the US and Russia, Kate Middleton's pregnancy.

=== 2013 Wipe ===
Series	Episode	Original airdate
Special		28 December 2013
Charlie Brooker, Doug Stanhope, Philomena Cunk (Diane Morgan) and Barry Shitpeas cover television and news media from 2013. Along with many smaller stories, the 2013 horse meat scandal, Grant Denyer fainting on Sunrise, the resignation of Pope Benedict XVI, Broadchurch, the death of Margaret Thatcher, Dogging Tales, the 2013 Moore tornado, English legalisation of same-sex marriage, increased popularity of Nigel Farage and UKIP, along with their coverage in the media and Godfrey Bloom, Breaking Bad, the Ariel Castro kidnappings (in particular, the victims' escape and Charles Ramsey), the music video for "Blurred Lines" (which Brooker implies to be misogynistic), the birth of Prince George, the deportation of Abu Qatada, Newsnight, a man claiming to be Jesus who was interviewed on This Morning, Your Face Sounds Familiar, The Great British Bake Off and The Apprentice (with allegations of attractive women being treated more favourably), the revived popularity of twerking following Miley Cyrus' performance at the 2013 MTV Video Music Awards, Edward Snowden's leak of PRISM documents, sensationalist news coverage of the false widow spider, claims by the media that Ralph Miliband hated Britain, Sex Box, Doctor Who Live: The Next Doctor and Nelson Mandela's death are under discussion.

=== 2014 Wipe ===
Series	Episode	Original airdate
Special		30 December 2014
Brooker discusses issues in the news such as: immigration; weather; Justin Bieber's arrest; the Russo-Ukrainian War; the disappearance of Malaysia Airlines Flight 370; Prince George; Jeremy Clarkson's use of the word "nigger"; the 2014 UK elections to the European Union and other UK political issues – including media appearances of David Cameron and Nick Clegg, the rise of UKIP, Russell Brand; ISIS and how it fits Western news media narratives; the spread of Ebola; the Ice Bucket Challenge; the property search of Cliff Richard; the Scottish independence referendum, including a Cassetteboy satirical remix of Cameron and Salmond's speeches; and Black Friday. Television and other media covered in the special includes Benefits Street, 12 Years a Slave, "Happy", When Corden Met Barlow, Tumble, misogynistic and homophobic Vine clips by Dapper Laughs and Dapper Laughs: On the Pull, Downton Abbey; outrage over a shirt worn by Matt Taylor on news coverage of the Rosetta space craft; and Sainsbury's Christmas advert. Adam Curtis narrates a short piece about Vladislav Surkov and Russia, and George Osborne and quantitative easing. The special ends with Charlie Brooker performing a song "Reasons to be Fearful: 14" listing topics covered in the show and other 2014 events.

=== 2015 Wipe ===
Series	Episode	Original airdate
Special		30 December 2015
Brooker discusses the Charlie Hebdo shooting and Moneysupermarket advert "Epic Strut". Cunk and Shitpeas review Fifty Shades of Grey. Brooker then covers the reburial of Richard III and the year's UK general election. Cunk presents a "Moments of Wonder" segment on feminism. Brooker comments on Jeremy Corbyn's leadership of the Labour Party and the aftermath of the election, then moving onto the killing of Cecil the lion. After a negative review of BBC show Frank Sinatra: Our Way, Brooker discusses the allegation that David Cameron put his penis into a dead pig's mouth at university ("Piggate"), along with the media's reaction, and how it mirrored the Black Mirror episode "The National Anthem", which he wrote years prior. Brooker then discusses the Ashley Madison data breach, Britain's intervention in Syria against ISIS (Operation Shader) and Donald Trump's presidential campaign.

=== 2016 Wipe ===
Series	Episode	Original airdate
Special		29 December 2016
After an introduction where Brooker briefly discusses the main stories of the year, he provides commentary on news coverage of the Drummond Puddle Watch and David Bowie's death, and lists celebrities who died in 2016. He then moves on to early Brexit campaigning, Elizabeth II's official 90th birthday celebrations. Barry Shitpeas reviews The Night Manager, under the impression it is a reboot of Fawlty Towers. The show moves onto Donald Trump's presidential campaign, and then EastEnders. This is followed by discussion of later campaigning for Brexit and the result and early aftermath of the referendum. Brooker covers Top Gear and Pokémon Go, along with the Conservative leadership election. Philomena Cunk reviews The Great British Bake Off, before Brooker covers Jeremy Corbyn's Labour leadership. More coverage of Trump's campaign follows, along with the phrase "Brexit means Brexit". A Cassetteboy remix of Trump's speeches is played, and Cunk does a "Moments of Wonder" segment on apocalypse featuring an interview with Brian Cox. The show ends with a satirical "Fake BBC News" segment.

=== The Best of 2010–2015 Wipe with Charlie Brooker ===
Series	Episode	Original airdate
Special		30 December 2019
End of decade compilation show with new introduction by Philomena Cunk. Was followed by a repeat of 2016 Wipe.

=== Antiviral Wipe ===
Series	Episode	Original airdate
Special		14 May 2020
Charlie Brooker is back, and he takes a look at life before and after the coronavirus lockdown. As well as coverage of the crisis itself, Charlie also explores what the public have been watching to while away the hours. Guest contributors joining him, from a safe distance, including the ever-insightful Philomena Cunk and Barry Shitpeas.

== See also ==
- Newswipe with Charlie Brooker
- Charlie Brooker's Gameswipe
- Charlie Brooker's Weekly Wipe
