= Death to 2020 =

2020 Netflix mockumentary by Charlie Brooker

- Title card
- Directed by: Al Campbell; Alice Mathias
- Written by: Charlie Brooker
- Produced by: Charlie Brooker; Annabel Jones
- Starring: Samuel L. Jackson; Hugh Grant; Lisa Kudrow; Leslie Jones; Joe Keery; Kumail Nanjiani; Tracey Ullman; Cristin Milioti; Diane Morgan; Samson Kayo
- Narrated by: Laurence Fishburne
- Cinematography: Jamie Cairney
- Production companies: Broke and Bones
- Distributed by: Netflix
- Release date: 27 December 2020
- Running time: 70 minutes
- Countries: United States; United Kingdom
- Language: English

Death to 2020 is a 2020 mockumentary film by Black Mirror creators Charlie Brooker and Annabel Jones under their Broke and Bones production company as a Netflix original production. The special features a series of fictional characters discussing US and UK events of 2020 including the COVID-19 pandemic and the U.S. presidential election. It was released on Netflix on 27 December 2020. The mockumentary received mostly negative critical reception, with reviewers criticising the jokes as obvious, though some of the cast performances were praised. A sequel special, Death to 2021, was released on 27 December 2021.

== Synopsis ==
In mockumentary format, characters discuss events of 2020 with a mixture of true information and satire. The overarching topic is the COVID-19 pandemic, particularly in the United States and the United Kingdom. The 2020 United States presidential election is also heavily featured. Events in the early part of the year include the latter part of the 2019–20 Australian bushfire season, Greta Thunberg's environmental speeches at the World Economic Forum, Prince Harry and his wife Meghan stepping down from the British royal family and the 2020 Oscars. The May 2020 murder of George Floyd and subsequent US protests are summarised, with commentary on the Donald Trump photo op at St. John's Church and protesters removing the statue of Edward Colston in Bristol, England.

On the topic of the pandemic, characters comment on the 2020 royal addresses to the nation in the UK, two national lockdowns in England, online circulation of false information, vaccine trials and the first uses of the Pfizer–BioNTech COVID-19 vaccine outside of a clinical trial. With regards to the US election, topics under discussion include acquittal of Donald Trump after his impeachment, Democratic primaries between Bernie Sanders and Joe Biden, presidential debates between Biden and Trump, The New York Times' reports on Trump's tax returns and Biden's choice of Kamala Harris as running mate. After Biden won the election, Trump attempted to overturn the results with a series of false claims and unsuccessful lawsuits.

The mockumentary closes with characters delivering lines that jokingly predict events of 2021.

== Cast ==
- Samuel L. Jackson as Dash Bracket, a reporter for the New Yorkerly News
- Hugh Grant as Tennyson Foss, a historian who repeatedly mixes up facts with pop culture moments
- Lisa Kudrow as Jeanetta Grace Susan, a non-official conservative spokesperson
- Leslie Jones as Dr. Maggie Gravel, a behavioral psychologist
- Joe Keery as Duke Goolies, a gig economy millennial
- Kumail Nanjiani as Bark Multiverse, CEO of Shreekr, a technology company
- Tracey Ullman as Queen Elizabeth II
- Cristin Milioti as Kathy Flowers, a self-described soccer mom, representing a stereotypical "Karen"
- Diane Morgan as Gemma Nerrick, an average citizen
- Samson Kayo as Pyrex Flask, a scientist the production team regularly annoy with unnecessary footage spliced over him talking
- Laurence Fishburne as the narrator
- Charlie Brooker as James, the director
- Angelo Irving as Boris Johnson

== Production ==
External videos
- "Death to 2020 – Official teaser" Released 7 December 2020
- "Death to 2020 – Official trailer" Released 21 December 2020

Prior to producing Black Mirror, Brooker had done several end-of-year topical comedy specials for the BBC based on his Weekly Wipe series up through 2016. He had created a special Antiviral Wipe earlier in 2020 at the onset of the COVID-19 pandemic. Brooker saw Death to 2020 as different to his previous topical comedy, as it is "more character-based" and he does not serve as presenter. He also described it as "sillier", summarising it as "part record of the year, part spoof documentary and part character comedy".

It is produced by Broke and Bones, which Brooker and Annabel Jones founded after departing from House of Tomorrow, the production company they had worked with for the Endemol Shine group in producing Black Mirror. The two reportedly left House of Tomorrow over intellectual property rights issues. Netflix has a deal for exclusive rights over Broke and Bones productions. Death to 2020 is its first full production after the co-production Antiviral Wipe.

The special was written with a team of writers over four months. It was filmed in late November across 10 days, in London and Los Angeles. Minimal crews were used due to the pandemic, with some actors in production bubbles. Each actor filmed for only one day. The Los Angeles filming shortly preceded a local lockdown there. Unlike Wipe specials, Brooker does not appear on-screen, but plays a director asking the talking heads questions. This decision was made partially because of an expectation that non-UK audiences would not be familiar with his appearance. Additionally, Diane Morgan appears in a different role—rather than recurring Wipe character Philomena Cunk, she plays Gemma Nerrick, ostensibly "one of the five most average people in the world". Cristin Milioti previously starred in Black Mirror episode "USS Callister".

Actors influenced their characters' portrayal, with Brooker highlighting Kudrow in particular as having a number of things she felt strongly about. To appeal to a global audience, UK subjects such as the Dominic Cummings scandal were avoided. News of Biden's win and the Pfizer vaccine rollout arrived days before filming. Brooker and Jones were both involved with the editing process.

Actor Hugh Grant revealed the project's existence in an interview with New York magazine in late November 2020, saying Brooker had written a mockumentary about the year 2020, which was dominated by the COVID-19 pandemic and described by some as a real-life version of a Black Mirror episode. Brooker said Grant would play the role of a historian who's being interviewed about the year. Further details of the special were announced in early December 2020, including many of the principal cast.

== Reception ==
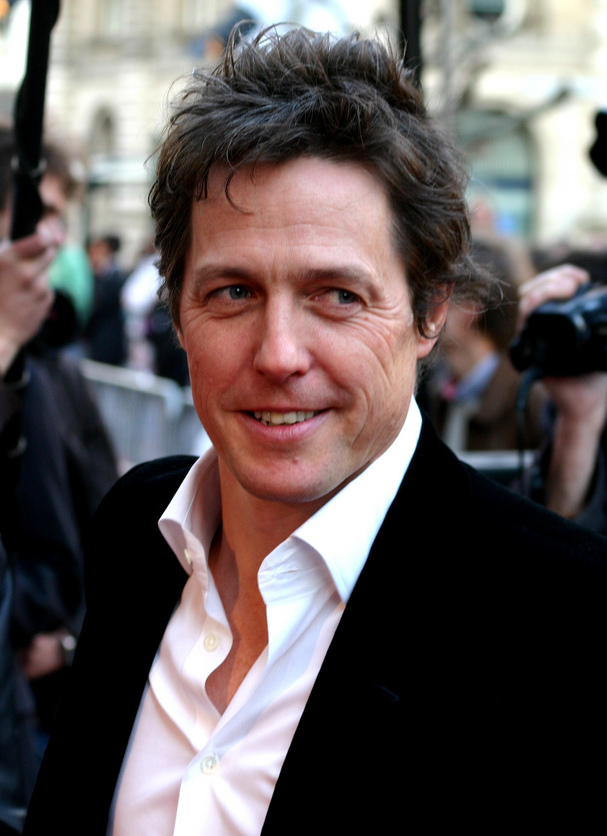
Hugh Grant's performance as Tennyson Foss was described as "a rare highlight in the otherwise disappointing production."

Critics branded the mockumentary as "disappointing", and compared it unfavourably to Charlie Brooker's Screenwipe and Black Mirror. On review aggregator Rotten Tomatoes, 40% of 20 critic reviews are positive, with an average rating of 4.3/10. According to Metacritic, which calculated an average score of 41 out of 100 based on 11 critics, it received "mixed or average" reviews.

In a one star review for The Independent, Ed Cumming found that he was often "waiting for punchlines that never arrive", saying that Grant is "not given a single decent line". Cumming criticised the absence of Brooker's narration, as found in the Wipe series, and wrote that the work "can't make up its mind whether it is for a British audience or an American one".

Chris Bennion gave the special two stars out of five in a review for The Telegraph, believing it to be a "huge disappointment" in which the humour is "as predictable as the targets of the jokes". Though reporting that most of the jokes are "at best wearily familiar", Bennion did find a few that "carry Brooker's acidic wit and giddy surrealism" and praised that Grant "adroitly captures the pomposity of the Grand Old TV Don". Another two star review came from Evening Standard's Nancy Durrant, who found it "not as good" as the Wipe specials. Durrant opined that a runtime of 45 minutes "would have been quite enough". Durrant praised Grant, Kudrow, Milioti and Morgan and the characters' names, along with some small jokes.

Though praising some of the characters, including Jackson, Fishburne and Milioti, Zack Handlen of The A.V. Club gave the episode a B−, summarising it as "obvious jokes over familiar footage". Handlen found nothing "particularly insightful" and criticised "a few lame stabs at 'both-sides-ing' the polarization of American politics". The Hollywood Reporter's Daniel Fienberg summarised the work as a "generally hacky piece of recycled political satire and tired documentary parody". Finding it "astonishing how lazy everything is", he viewed it as worse than many American topical comedies and said that the humour comes "almost exclusively from the enthusiasm of an impressively star-studded cast". However, Fienberg praised Milioti and Morgan and found it "appropriate" that Jackson discusses most of the material revolving around George Floyd protests with "only anger and outrage". The Los Angeles Times called the mockumentary a "bitingly funny, hastily assembled and slightly deranged comedic retrospective".

== Sequel ==
A programme in the same style, Death to 2021, aired on 27 December 2021, produced by Broke and Bones. Alongside returning cast such as Grant, Ullman and Morgan, the mockumentary starred new members including Lucy Liu, Stockard Channing and William Jackson Harper. According to Digital Spy, Brooker had a reduced role, not participating as executive producer due to work on other projects. Instead, the executive producers were Jones and Ben Caudell—a writer for Cunk on Britain, a programme starring Morgan's character Philomena Cunk. The special was directed by Jack Clough and Josh Ruben.
