= Death to 2021 =

Netflix mockumentary

- Title card
- Directed by: Jack Clough; Josh Ruben
- Written by: Ben Caudell
- Produced by: Annabel Jones; Ben Caudell; Nick Vaughan-Smith; Hazel Rose; Simon Winkler
- Starring: Hugh Grant; Joe Keery; William Jackson Harper; Lucy Liu; Tracey Ullman; Samson Kayo; Stockard Channing; Cristin Milioti; Diane Morgan; Alistair Green
- Narrated by: Laurence Fishburne
- Production companies: Broke and Bones
- Distributed by: Netflix
- Release date: December 27, 2021
- Running time: 60 minutes
- Country: United States
- Language: English

Death to 2021 is a 2021 mockumentary produced by Netflix. A sequel to Death to 2020, the special features a series of fictional characters discussing US news in 2021, including the COVID-19 pandemic, vaccine misinformation and Big Tech.

== Cast ==
Credits adapted from Radio Times.

- Hugh Grant as Tennyson Foss, a right-wing historian
- Joe Keery as Duke Goolies, a social media influencer
- William Jackson Harper as Zero Fournine, a social media company CEO
- Lucy Liu as Snook Austin, a journalist
- Tracey Ullman as Madison Madison, a far-right conspiracy theorist news anchor
- Samson Kayo as Pyrex Flask, a scientist researching SARS-CoV-2
- Stockard Channing as Penn Parker, a journalist
- Cristin Milioti as Kathy Flowers, a mother who supports Donald Trump and believes conspiracy theories
- Diane Morgan as Gemma Nerrick, a member of the public

== Production ==
Death to 2021 is a sequel to Death to 2020, both productions of Broke and Bones—a company founded by Charlie Brooker and Annabel Jones, best-known for their work on science fiction anthology series Black Mirror. It followed several years of Weekly Wipe specials, hosted by Brooker, that humorously recapped news events from the year. Death to 2020 received negative critical reception.

For the 2021 special, Brooker had a reduced role—a Netflix spokesperson told British Comedy Guide that he was working on other productions for the streaming service. A number of cast from 2020 returned, but others—for example, Lucy Liu, Stockard Channing and William Jackson Harper—debuted in 2021. Ullman plays a different character to the 2020 special—an American news anchor, rather than the Queen.

== Reception ==
Entertainment.ie's Eoghan Cannon rated the film 2.5 out of 5, saying that it would be "unwatchable" without the strong cast, and is not sufficiently memorable for viewers to remember it the next morning. However, Cannon praised the coverage of light-hearted stories. Ed Power of The Daily Telegraph gave it 1 star, lambasting it as lacking originality and nuance. He negatively portrayed the absence of Brooker, calling it a negative image of Black Mirror, but praised Morgan's joking comparison of Squid Game to The Great British Bake Off.

Screen Rant criticized that the special had a "refusal to talk about cultural events outside of Netflix's domain", with segments about their original productions Bridgerton and Squid Game but omitting other television and film of the year. According to The National, a joke about Glasgow being part of London was well-received by Scottish viewers. Bruce Dessau of Beyond the Joke wrote that Death to 2021 was targeted at an American audience, to a further extent than the previous year's special. Dessau praised Morgan, Grant and Kayo, and said that pushback to a joke about Prince Philip's death came from people "that [have] clearly not seen a Brooker programme before".
