= Cat Burglar =

2022 interactive animated film

- Promotional poster, depicting Rowdy (left) and Peanut (right).
- Directed by: James Bowman
- Written by: Mike Hollingsworth; Charlie Brooker; James Bowman
- Produced by: Mike Hollingsworth; Charlie Brooker; Annabel Jones
- Starring: Alan Lee; James Adomian; Trevor Devall
- Music by: Christopher Willis
- Production companies: Netflix Animation Studios; Broke & Bones
- Distributed by: Netflix
- Release date: 22 February 2022
- Running time: Variable; approx. 15 minutes
- Countries: Ireland; United Kingdom; United States
- Language: English

Cat Burglar is a 2022 animated interactive heist comedy short film created by Charlie Brooker and co-written by supervising director Mike Hollingsworth and director James Bowman, with Annabel Jones as an executive producer. The viewer plays as a cartoon cat burglar named Rowdy who is trying to steal a valuable artwork from a museum which is protected by a security guard dog named Peanut. The viewer must answer a series of trivia questions correctly to advance the story and avoid Rowdy losing his three remaining lives. The film pays homage to the works of animator Tex Avery.

The film debuted on Netflix on 22 February 2022 and was made available until 1 December 2024.

It was nominated for two Children's and Family Emmy Awards, including one for Outstanding Interactive Media. The soundtrack, composed by Christopher Willis, won the award for Outstanding Music Direction and Composition for an Animated Program.

== Plot ==
Rowdy Cat (James Adomian), a feline burglar, learns that a museum is displaying a valuable artwork which he decides to steal. Peanut (Alan Lee), the museum's canine security guard, is ordered by the museum's director, Hari de Balzac (Trevor Devall) to protect the artwork from being stolen. The story sees Rowdy attempting to break into the museum and successfully steal the painting without being caught by Peanut, which is done by the viewer answering a series of trivia questions. Every time the viewer gets the questions right, the story progresses. Wrong answers lead to Rowdy losing one of his three remaining lives—a montage shows him losing six lives before the burglary. The cartoon ends when either Rowdy successfully steals the artwork and wins, or when Rowdy runs out of lives and loses.

== Voice cast ==
- Alan Lee as Peanut
- James Adomian as Rowdy Cat, Priest, Devil
- Trevor Devall as Museum Director (Hari de Balzac), God

== Production ==
The film was released on 22 February 2022. According to Netflix, the typical runtime is 15 minutes, and the film offers around 90 minutes of animation depending on the viewer's route through the story. The film consists of several hundred segments; the animation, sound effects, and music required dovetailing so that each path between segments progresses seamlessly. With Christopher Willis in charge of music, the soundtrack was performed by a London orchestra of 40 musicians.

Cat Burglar was the first production by Charlie Brooker and Annabel Jones's production company Broke and Bones since it was acquired by Netflix. The pair were previously involved in interactive fiction in the 2018 special Bandersnatch, part of the science fiction anthology series Black Mirror. Though a fan of the genre, Brooker had not previously worked in animation. Mike Hollingsworth served as Supervising Director. It was inspired by the animated shorts made by Tex Avery for Metro-Goldwyn-Mayer (MGM). Hollingsworth was a fan and named his child "Avery" after the "King of Cartoons", while Brooker liked the "timeless, surreal anarchy" of the cartoons, which were "smart and brutal and subversive". Ideas for animation, such as the style of Rowdy's death, were primarily pitched by Hollingsworth and James Bowman, and then refined or rejected. Brooker pushed for a high level of violence in the cartoon.

Brooker's previous experience with interactive fiction led him to be wary of complicated story paths. He was interested in the viewer determining the storyline outcome indirectly, rather than through direct choices as with Bandersnatch. He arrived at the idea of a skill-based game, like those in the franchise Dragon's Lair. The questions in Cat Burglar are intended to emphasize the speed of answering over knowledge. The interactive work was the first by Netflix to incorporate trivia, preceding the April 2022 game Trivia Quest, an adaptation of Trivia Crack with episodic trivia questions framed within a narrative story. The animation was done by Boulder Media.

Netflix removed most of the interactive media, including Cat Burglar, from their catalogue in December 2024.

== Reception ==
Cat Burglar received generally positive reviews. Stuart Jeffries gave it 4 out of 5 stars in The Guardian, praising the music and the homages to classic cartoons. Lauren O'Neill of i also gave Cat Burglar 4 out of 5 stars, liking the interactive elements which make the viewer less passive in comparison to most streamed television. Caroline Framke of Variety enjoyed the interactive aspects, saying that it was tempting to mess up to see what kind of twists the show would take. Ed Power of The Daily Telegraph, however, was more critical, giving it 3 out of 5 stars, liking the animation, but feeling frustrated by the interactive elements, arguing that they felt "tacked on".

=== Accolades ===
Year	Award	Category	Nominee(s)	Result	Ref.
2022	1st Children's and Family Emmy Awards	Outstanding Interactive Media	Cat Burglar	Nominated	
2022	1st Children's and Family Emmy Awards	Outstanding Music Direction and Composition for an Animated Program	Christopher Willis	Won	
