= BBC Four =

British television channel

- Logo used since 2021
- Country: United Kingdom
- Broadcast area: United Kingdom; Isle of Man; Channel Islands
- Network: BBC Television
- Headquarters: London, England

Programming
- Language: English
- Picture format: 1080i/1080p (Note: 1080p25 sometimes only on Freeview) HDTV (downscaled to 576i for the SDTV feed)

Ownership
- Owner: BBC
- Sister channels: BBC One; BBC Two; BBC Three; BBC News; BBC Parliament; CBBC; CBeebies; BBC Scotland; BBC Alba

History
- Launched: 2 March 2002; 24 years ago
- Replaced: BBC Knowledge

Links
- Website: bbc.co.uk/bbcfour

Availability

Terrestrial
- Freeview (UK): Channel 9 (SD; 24 in Scotland); Channel 106 (HD)

Streaming media
- BBC iPlayer: Watch live (UK only)
- Virgin TV Anywhere: Watch live (Ireland only)

BBC Four is a British free-to-air public broadcast television channel owned and operated by the BBC. It was launched on 2 March 2002 and shows a wide variety of programmes including arts, documentaries, music, international film and drama, and current affairs. It is required by its licence to air at least 100 hours of new arts and music programmes, 110 hours of new factual programmes, and to premiere twenty foreign films each year. The channel broadcasts daily from 7:00 pm to 4:00 am, timesharing with CBeebies (which starts at 6:00 am).

== History ==
Logo used from 2002 to 2021

The channel was announced by Greg Dyke on 25 August 2000, as part of a plan that also oversaw the replacement of BBC Choice with BBC Three. Liz Cleaver was appointed its controller on 8 December.

BBC Four launched on 2 March 2002 at 7:00 pm GMT, having been delayed from the original planned 2001 launch. BBC Four began as a late schedule for BBC Two, before it received its own channel, along with BBC Three. BBC Four was launched before BBC Three as a result of the government delaying approval for the latter. The channel replaced BBC Knowledge, an educational and cultural channel that had undergone many changes throughout its lifetime; in its final format it carried a schedule of documentaries and art programming, essentially a test of the new BBC Four schedule. It was rebranded as part of BBC Four, aligning it with the existing BBC One and Two brands. Planning for the new channel, along with the new BBC Three, had been in progress since October 2000; however, the incumbent government delayed approving the new BBC digital plans. The BBC Four plans were approved earlier, and as a result launched before BBC Three.

BBC Four was different from the old BBC Knowledge: the channel would be more heavily promoted with more new and original programming and the channel would not be broadcast 24 hours a day. This was because on the Freeview digital terrestrial platform, BBC Four is broadcast in a statistically multiplexed stream in Multiplex B that timeshares with the CBeebies channel (which is on air from 06:00 until 19:00). As a result, BBC Four broadcasts from 19:00 to around 04:00 each night, with an hour's down-time and promotions for CBeebies before the start of that channel's schedule.

On 12 May 2011, BBC Four was added to the Sky EPG in the Republic of Ireland on channel 230. It later moved to EPG 211 to free up space for new channels. It later moved to channel 143 on 1 May 2018 to sit beside the Northern Irish versions of BBC One and BBC Two there, and the 200s being used for +1 channels.

On 17 August 2018, BBC Four announced BBC 4.1, a special two nights of programming which would revolve around artificial intelligence (AI) selecting the programmes broadcast on the channel, based on "what BBC Four audiences might like, based on the channel's previous schedules and programme attributes." It would then "[rank] programmes it thought were most relevant [to what BBC Four viewers would like]." The programming was aired on the nights of 4 and 5 September 2018. This included a few special programmes about AI, such as "Made by Machine: When AI Met The Archive", which documented how the AI works, and "The Joy of AI", where "the emergence of machine learning" is discussed, as well as "why AI shouldn't spook us".

On 19 February 2019, Virgin Media stopped providing BBC Four in standard definition.

Due to the launch of BBC Scotland on 24 February 2019, BBC Four has been on a higher Freeview EPG number in Scotland than elsewhere, moving to 82 to make room for BBC Scotland. Following eventual closures, it moved to channel 75 there, and later to channel 68, and eventually channel 55. On 4 November 2020, due to Ofcom proposals regarding certain PSB channels requiring greater prominence on each UK TV provider's channel listing, BBC Four moved to channel 24 in Scotland, while every channel from that number (ITV4) to channel 54 (5Select) moved up one place.

In May 2020, the BBC submitted its annual general plan for 2020–21, which included a proposal for BBC Two to supplant BBC Four as its main outlet for specialist programmes. Under the plan, BBC Four would cease originating new programmes, and become a service showcasing the BBC's "rich archive". The plan also included the possibility of the BBC expanding BBC Four into a global brand, to "[take] our strengths in specialist factual to the world stage."

On 26 May 2022, the BBC announced plans to discontinue BBC Four as a broadcast channel within "the next few years", as part of plans to streamline and modify services to create a "digital-first" BBC. In March 2023, it was reported that the BBC was considering a reversal of the decision, citing its viewership and low cost of operation, and concerns that the relaunch of BBC Three as a linear channel had not been successful: the aforementioned cuts to original programming had reduced its budget by half in comparison to 2017, and the channel's reach in February 2023 was 15.8 million—which was 50% higher than BBC Three in the same month.

== Organisation ==
The channel direction is determined by the channel's remit, set by royal charter and the corporation's governing body (the BBC Board), and by the channel controller. In October 2013, following the departure of Richard Klein from the controllership, the management of the channel changed, with the role of Controller of BBC Four scrapped: from this point the Controller of BBC Two would have ultimate oversight of BBC Four as part of their role, absorbing some of the former duties of the Controller of BBC Four, but a new 'Channel Editor' post, reporting up to this controller, would be created to take day-to-day charge of Four. The controllers of BBC Four from 2002 to 2016 have been:

- 2002–2004: Roly Keating
- 2004–2008: Janice Hadlow
- 2008–2013: Richard Klein
- 2013–2014: Janice Hadlow (as Controller of BBC Two and BBC Four) "on an interim basis" – Hadlow had been Controller of BBC Two since departing BBC Four in 2008
- Early 2014: Adam Barker (interim Controller of BBC Two and BBC Four following Janice Hadlow's departure to a new post)
- 2014–2016: Kim Shillinglaw (as Controller of BBC Two and BBC Four)

Channel Editors of BBC Four have been:

- 2013–present: Cassian Harrison

As of 2011, BBC Four had an annual budget of £54.3 million.

On 20 January 2016, Kim Shillinglaw announced that she had decided to leave the BBC as the Controller of BBC Two and BBC Four. As a result of the reorganisation, the post of BBC Two and Four control had closed after her departure later that year.

== BBC Four HD ==
BBC Four HD logo (2013–2021)

On 16 July 2013, the BBC announced that a high-definition (HD) simulcast of BBC Four would be launched by early 2014. The channel launched on 10 December 2013 at 18:58 GMT, and rolled out nationwide up to June 2014 (as did BBC Three HD, BBC News HD, CBBC HD and CBeebies HD). The channel shares its stream with CBeebies HD, as they both air at different times. In June 2022, BBC Four HD moved from the COM7 multiplex on Freeview to Multiplex B due to the closure of COM7 for spectrum reallocation; this move allows the service to reach nearly the entirety of the UK.

Prior to launch, the majority of BBC Four's HD output was broadcast on the BBC HD channel, before its closure on 26 March 2013. In 2017, BBC Four HD, along with CBBC HD and CBeebies HD, launched in Ireland.

== Programming ==
BBC Four's primary role is to reflect a range of UK and international arts, music and culture. It should provide an ambitious range of innovative, high quality programming that is intellectually and culturally enriching, taking an expert and in-depth approach to a wide range of subjects.

— BBC Four Remit

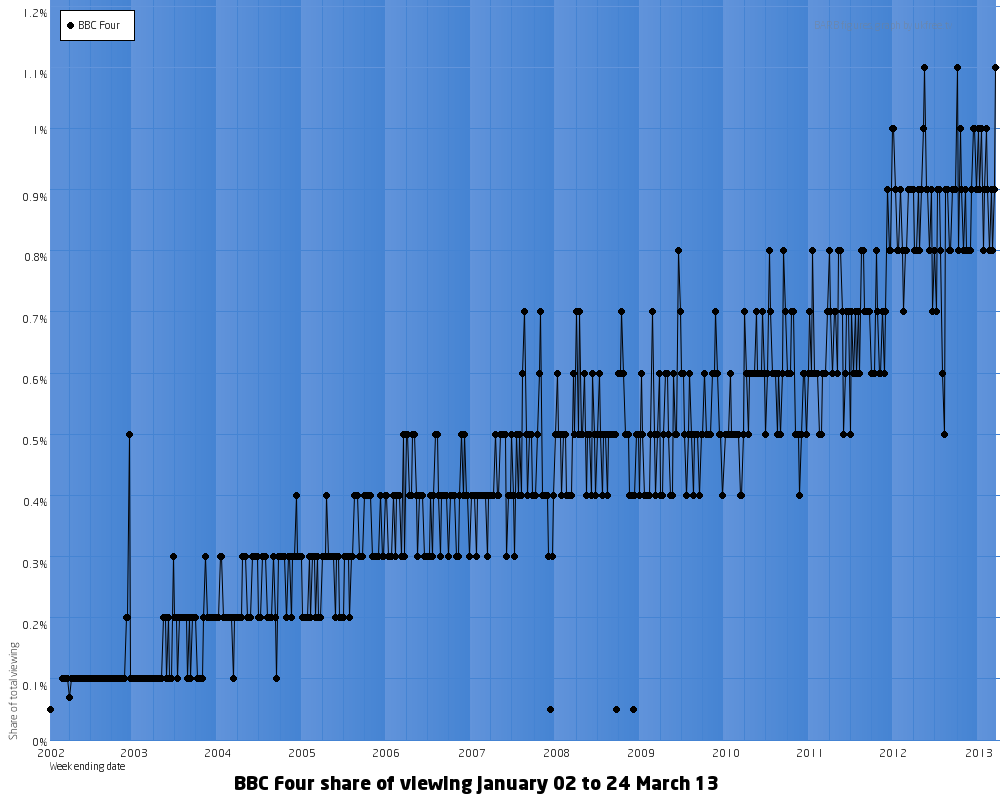
BBC Four share of viewing 2002-2013 BARB figures

The first evening's BBC Four programmes were simulcast on BBC Two, with the first programme being The Man Who Destroyed Everything, a documentary about conceptual artist Michael Landy and his installation Break Down. BBC Four was also notable for first showing Larry David's Seinfeld follow-up, Curb Your Enthusiasm, Armando Iannucci's cutting political satire, The Thick of It, The Chaser's War on Everything, Flight of the Conchords, Mad Men and Danish thriller The Killing.

The channel broadcasts a mixture of art and science documentaries, vintage drama (including many rare black-and-white programmes), and non-English-language productions such as films from the Artificial Eye catalogue, the French thriller Spiral and the Swedish detective series Wallander. BBC Four further supports foreign-language films with its annual World Cinema Award which has been running since 2004.

From the channel's launch in 2002 until the middle of 2020, BBC Four broadcast a global news bulletin on weeknights. Originally this was the BBC Four News presented initially by George Alagiah, which ran at 8pm. It was rebranded in January 2004 as The World, and was axed in May 2007, replaced the following week by World News Today, in a new 7pm timeslot. More recently BBC Four moved news programmes to 7pm with a simulcast of Beyond 100 Days Monday–Thursday and an edition of World News Today on Fridays which was produced by BBC World News. As of autumn 2020, BBC Four no longer broadcasts a news bulletin.

It screens a number of documentaries such as The Century of the Self and The Trials of Henry Kissinger. The channel is also home to many political travel shows such as Holidays in the Axis of Evil which features investigative journalism.

Drama has given the channel some of its most popular programmes, with The Alan Clark Diaries (2003) and Kenneth Williams: Fantabulosa! (2006) being among the highest rated, with over 800,000 viewers. The highly acclaimed Hattie, broadcast in 2011, holds the record for BBC Four's best ever consolidated ratings, of 2m / 8%. Before that The Curse of Steptoe brought the channel its highest audience figures, estimated as 1.41 million viewers, a 7% share of multichannel audiences between 21:00 and 22:05, based on overnight returns. The official audience figures for the broadcast, including time-shifting, were later published as 1,625,000.

Another notable production was a live re-make of the 1953 science-fiction serial The Quatermass Experiment, adapted from the original scripts into a single, two-hour version (though on the night it underran considerably, lasting less than 1 hour 40 minutes), broadcast on the evening of Saturday 2 April 2005. Discounting BBC Four's previous live relays of theatrical William Shakespeare productions, this was the first live made-for-television drama to be broadcast by the BBC for twenty years.

Another notable programme broadcast on BBC Four is Charlie Brooker's Screenwipe which contains reviews of current shows, as well as stories and commentary on how television is produced. The show is presented by broadcaster Charlie Brooker. The show was very successful and spawned several spin-offs such as Newswipe with Charlie Brooker, Charlie Brooker's Gameswipe and Charlie Brooker's Weekly Wipe.

The channel is also curator and leader of the BBC Archive project whose aim is that the BBC's television archive is re-broadcast as much as appropriate so that the Archive can be enjoyed again and not isolated.

Some output from BBC Four (documentaries rather than foreign films) was for a time repeated on BBC Two in a 'BBC Four on Two' branded area, although this was often in a late night broadcast slot after Newsnight and has since been discontinued.

According to BARB the comedy panel game QI has the highest ratings of any show on BBC Four.

At the Edinburgh International Television Festival, BBC Four won the Non-Terrestrial Channel of the Year award in 2004, 2006 and 2012.

In 2012 Dirk Gently became the first continuing drama series produced for the channel.

During the period when BBC Three was not broadcasting as a linear TV channel, BBC Four was occasionally used to show live sports coverage. The channel aired games from the UEFA Euro 2016 and 2018 FIFA World Cup football tournaments when the final round of matches in the group stages took place (when matches in each group kick-off simultaneously). It has also been used to broadcast England women's football matches, as well as some matches from the 2019 FIFA Women's World Cup. It also temporarily extended its broadcast hours to show live action from the 2016 Summer Olympics.

As of 2023, BBC Four schedules still feature music programming (such as Top of the Pops and Neil Brand's documentaries) on a Friday night, with drama imports on a Saturday (but not always foreign-language productions like Italian crime drama Inspector Montalbano) and usually an hour of 'archive' programmes (such as those by Bob Ross and Fred Dibnah) starting off the weekday schedule at 7pm. As well as programmes from the 1980s and 1990s, this early evening slot gives a chance for regional programmes to get a national airing with Cy Chadwick's Walking with... productions and Gareth Edwards's Great Welsh Adventure (from BBC Wales) getting a repeat here and then again late night. In addition to these programmes, many hour long regional documentaries such as BBC Scotland's Rigs of Nigg, about the 1970s North Sea oil drilling platform construction industry based around the Cromarty Firth, also received their national debut on the channel.

On 9 April 2021, BBC Four was suspended due to the death of Prince Philip, Duke of Edinburgh, in order to preserve bandwidth for the broadcast of news coverage and tribute programming on BBC One and Two. This was done for the same reasons after the death of Elizabeth II on 8 September 2022.

== Programmes ==
=== Original programmes ===
- The Art of Cornwall
- The Ballad of Mott the Hoople
- BBC Four News
- BBC Four Sessions
- Beyond 100 Days (simulcast on BBC Four, BBC News and BBC World News; Previously 100 Days (January – April 2017), 100 Days + (May – July 2017)
- Birds Britania
- Britain by Bike
- Britain's Best Drives (2009)
- Britain's Lost Masterpieces (2016 – 2022)
- Can Eating Insects Save the World
- Charlie Brooker's Screenwipe (2006 – 2008)
- Children's TV on Trial
- Churches: How To Read Them
- The Curse of Steptoe (2008)
- Detectorists (2014 – 2017, 2022)
- Dinosaurs, Myths and Monsters (2011)
- Dirk Gently (2010 – 2012)
- Elegance and Decadence: The Age of the Regency
- The First World War
- Frankenstein: Birth of a Monster
- Free Will and Testament: The Robert Wyatt Story
- Goodbye BBC Television Centre
- The Great War
- Hattie
- H. G. Wells: War with the World
- Hinterland/Y Gwyll (Joint BBC / S4C production, English-language version)
- Hive Minds
- How to Build a Dinosaur
- If Walls Could Talk
- Jerusalem: The Making of a Holy City
- Music for Misfits: The Story of Indie
- Only Connect
- Racing at the BBC
- Sandhurst
- The Secret Life of Ice
- Shock and Awe: The Life of Electricity
- Singer-Songwriters at the BBC
- Sings the...
- The Life of Rock with Brian Pern
- The Story of Musicals
- The Story of the National Grid
- Survivors: Nature's Indestructible Creatures
- Tales of Television Centre
- Talking Children
- Timeshift
- Twenty Twelve
- To Kill a Mockingbird at 50
- Walter's War
- We Need Answers
- World News Today (simulcast on BBC Four and BBC World News, previously World News Today with Zeinab Badawi)
- A Very British History

=== Imports ===
- Arne Dahl
- Borgen
- The Bridge
- Hostages
- Inspector De Luca
- Inspector Montalbano
- The Joy of Painting
- The Killing
- Minuscule
- The Money
- Salamander
- Spiral
- Trapped
- Wallander

=== Domestic repeats ===
- Africa
- All Creatures Great and Small
- Batman
- The Bear Family and Me
- Between the Lines
- Blackadder
- Blue Peter (Classics only)
- The Blue Planet
- Boys from the Blackstuff
- Butterflies
- Casualty 1906
- Casualty 1907
- Civilisation
- Climbing Great Buildings
- Cranford
- Doctor Who (1963–89)
- Ever Decreasing Circles
- Fawlty Towers
- The Frozen Planet
- The Good Life
- The Good Old Days
- Great British Railway Journeys
- A House Through Time
- I, Claudius
- Juliet Bravo
- Last of the Summer Wine
- Life
- The Life and Loves of a She-Devil
- The Life of Mammals
- The Likely Lads
- Monty Python's Flying Circus
- No Place Like Home
- Not in Front of the Children
- The Onedin Line
- One Foot in the Grave
- Our Friends in the North
- Outnumbered
- Peaky Blinders (Series 1-4, 6)
- Parkinson
- Planet Earth
- Porridge
- Pride and Prejudice
- The Sky at Night
- Some Mothers Do 'Ave 'Em
- Sorry!
- Steptoe and Son
- Sykes
- Talking Pictures
- This Life
- The Two Ronnies Sketchbook
- Waking the Dead
- Walking with Beasts
- Walking with Dinosaurs
- War Walks
- Whatever Happened to the Likely Lads?
- Yes Minister
- Yes, Prime Minister
- The Young Ones

=== Music concerts ===
- BBC Radio 1's Big Weekend (from 2016)
- Coldplay Live
- David Gilmour Live in Gdansk (part of David Gilmour Night)
- Eurovision Song Contest semi-finals (2016–2021)
- Madness Live (part of Goodbye Television Centre)
- Queen 1975 Live
- Glastonbury Festival
- Madonna Rebel Heart Tour

=== Music programming ===
- ...at the BBC (an original hour long music compilation usually featuring performances from various BBC TV shows, with bands like ABBA, genres like disco and acts from record labels such as Motown and Island featured)
- The Old Grey Whistle Test
- The Sound of Musicals with Neil Brand (documentary series)
- The Sound of TV with Neil Brand (documentary series)
- Top of the Pops (episodes repeated each week from BBC One, with the run continuing from 1976 to 2000 as of November 2026)
- Top of the Pops: The Story of... (an original hour long year-by-year documentary on BBC Four, also shown on BBC Two/UKTV Yesterday in an edited 45 minute version)
- Top of the Pops: Big Hits (an original hour long year-by-year compilation featuring performances from the show with added on-screen facts, also shown on BBC Two)
- Top of the Pops: Big Hits 1964 to 1975 (a 90-minute version of the Big Hits format featuring early hits from the show, also shown on UKTV's Yesterday channel)

=== Most watched programmes ===
The following is a list of the ten most watched broadcasts on BBC Four since launch, based on Live +7 data supplied by BARB. Number of viewers does not include repeats.

Rank	Programme	Number of Viewers	Date
1	The Jeremy Thorpe Scandal	2,378,000	3 June 2018
2	Threads (1984 film)	2,300,000	9 October 2024
3	Hattie	2,005,000	19 January 2011
4	The Bridge	1,810,000	21 November 2015
5	Snooker: 2020 World Championship	1,738,500	14 August 2020
6	Detectorists	1,687,000	8 November 2017
7	Roots	1,659,000	8 February 2017
8	The Curse of Steptoe	1,625,000	19 March 2008
9	The Bridge	1,620,000	1 February 2014
10	Detectorists	1,593,000	22 November 2017

== Availability outside the UK ==
BBC Four is widely available on cable, IPTV and digital satellite television in the Republic of Ireland, the Netherlands, Belgium, Switzerland and Liechtenstein. The channel is registered to broadcast within the European Union/EEA through the Luxembourg Broadcasting Regulator – ALIA.

== Presentation ==
The channel's initial series of idents were generated dynamically reflecting the frequencies of the continuity announcers' voice or of backing music and were designed by Lambie-Nairn. As a result, no two idents were ever the same. The first continuity announcer was Zeb Soanes.

When the channel first started airing, it used the slogan "Everybody Needs A Place To Think", but the BBC stopped using this several months after the launch. However the BBC Four logo and above slogan can be found, engraved on benches along the South Bank in London, between the London Eye and Waterloo Bridge.

On 10 September 2005, the channel began showing new idents comprising a central BBC Four logo surrounded by four quadrants which show different stages of the same footage thus making for a sort of optical illusion; for example, a swimming pool where a person on an inflatable ring appears in the bottom-left corner, though ripples don't enter the remaining quarters. Although the image appears as one at the start of the ident, by the end it is clearly four separate images. These were the longest-running idents ever used by the BBC - they lasted until the channel's rebrand in 2021, however, the "quadrants" theme continues to this day.

In March 2019, BBC Four added several new idents inspired by "oddly satisfying videos" in tandem with the quadrants theme, originally premiering for a programme season honouring the 30th anniversary of the World Wide Web.

== See also ==
- List of documentary television channels
- BBC Four World Cinema Awards
