= Hang the DJ =

- Black Mirror episode
- Promotional poster released as part of the "13 Days of Black Mirror"
- Episode no.: Series 4 Episode 4
- Directed by: Tim Van Patten
- Written by: Charlie Brooker
- Cinematography by: Stuart Bentley
- Editing by: Mark Davis
- Original release date: 29 December 2017
- Running time: 51 minutes

Guest appearances
- Georgina Campbell as Amy; Joe Cole as Frank; George Blagden as Lenny; Gwyneth Keyworth as Nicola; Jessie Cave as Edna; Luke Manning as Mike; Gina Bramhill as Coach

Episode chronology
← Previous "Crocodile"	Next → "Metalhead"

"Hang the DJ" is the fourth episode of the fourth series of the British anthology series Black Mirror. It was written by series creator Charlie Brooker and directed by Tim Van Patten. The episode first aired on Netflix, along with the rest of series four, on 29 December 2017. It follows Amy (Georgina Campbell) and Frank (Joe Cole), who are matched into relationships for fixed lengths of time by an algorithm that eventually determines their life-long partner.

The episode was inspired by the streaming service Spotify, as Brooker considered a system which gives people "playlists" of relationships. The production designer Joel Collins's visit to an expensive holiday area became the basis for the setting.

Critics drew parallels between the episode and online dating through apps such as Tinder, and made comparisons to the series three episode "San Junipero", among other works. The episode received positive reception according to Rotten Tomatoes and was nominated for three British Academy Television Awards (BAFTAs), but critics wrote mixed comments about the storyline and the final twist, though were mostly favourable towards the characters of Frank and Amy.

The episode takes its name from the chorus of the song "Panic" by the Smiths.

== Plot ==
Frank (Joe Cole) and Amy (Georgina Campbell) use a circular device called "Coach" that matches them with romantic partners for fixed periods of time. They are matched together for 12 hours. Despite initial nerves, they quickly get on and regret not having sex as they part. Coach (voice of Gina Bramhill) tells them the system monitors each relationship to assign them a lifelong partner on "pairing day", with a success rate of 99.8%.

Frank's next match Nicola (Gwyneth Keyworth) immediately disdains him, but they are paired for a year. Meanwhile, Amy finds her nine-month match Lenny (George Blagden) attractive. Amy and Frank meet again, at an event where a couple talk about their successful pairing. Amy begins to find Lenny's mannerisms tiresome, particularly his heavy exhalations. After the relationship ends, she is repeatedly matched with people for 36 hours; having sex with each match, she begins to dissociate over the matches' pointlessness.

After Frank's match ends, he and Amy are matched again and they agree not to check the time length, to avoid preconceptions. They enjoy having sex for the first time and talk about how the system might work. One night, Frank checks the expiry date. It initially says five years but recalibrates, as Frank's betrayal of their agreement has destabilised it, until it reads 20 hours. Frank is distracted the next day as Amy notices every pebble she skips hits the water four times; he admits what has happened with an hour remaining. She is furious and he is heartbroken.

They continue matches to no avail. The evening before Amy's pairing day, she chooses Frank for her one permitted farewell session before skipping Coach across a swimming pool. At dinner with Frank, whose pairing day is also tomorrow, she encourages him to leave with her. Recognising that neither of them have memories prior to the system, she thinks the world is a test and they must rebel. A man with a taser approaches; Amy touches the taser and it stops working, and the people in the restaurant freeze. Frank and Amy run and scale a wall that separates the outside world. They are revealed to be in one of 1,000 simulated realities—in 998 of these worlds, the simulated Frank and Amy rebelled to be together. In the real world, a dating app assigns Frank to Amy as a 99.8% match. They make eye contact for the first time across a bar as "Panic" by the Smiths plays. (Note: The episode's title is drawn from the "Panic" lyric "Hang the DJ".)

== Production ==
Whilst series one and two of Black Mirror were shown on Channel 4 in the UK, in September 2015 Netflix commissioned the series for 12 episodes, and in March 2016 it outbid Channel 4 for the rights to distribute the series in the UK, with a bid of $40 million. The 12-episode order was divided into two series of six episodes each, with "Hang the DJ" in the latter group. The six episodes in series four were released on Netflix simultaneously on 29 December 2017. "Hang the DJ" is listed as the fourth episode, but as Black Mirror is an anthology series, each instalment can be watched in any order.

=== Conception and writing ===
According to the executive producer Annabel Jones, "Hang the DJ" reflects on the state of dating in the present day and a "general sense of loneliness". The episode originated from series creator and episode writer Charlie Brooker, who conceived of the Coach dating application by analogy with the audio streaming platform Spotify: it determines a "playlist" of relationships that one should have before settling down with a partner. It was not obvious what storyline could be developed when the dating application users' experience was predetermined. Variations were considered and one idea floated was that the app could learn from each relationship. Amy and Frank being driven apart before reuniting was a desired narrative arc, and became possible when the twist was introduced. The script was rushed because of its deadline at a busy point in the production cycle.

The episode is similar to series three episode "San Junipero" in its positivity, in contrast to other instalments. Brooker was concerned about fans disliking the "light and playful comic tone" of "Hang the DJ" and was initially reluctant to write a happy ending. However, he expected people to enjoy Amy and Frank's relationship, having seen positive audience reaction to Kelly and Yorkie in "San Junipero". Both episodes reveal in a twist that the setting is a simulated reality. One challenge with "Hang the DJ" was to keep this unclear until the very end while still making the viewer aware that the setting is unusual. In one scene, Frank and Amy suggest that the world is simulated, as a "double-bluff" from Brooker.

The writers discussed how long Frank should initially see as his second relationship length with Amy. Brooker said their ultimate decision of five years is "a reasonable amount of time for a serious relationship", but Frank is disappointed to discover this as it means the relationship will end. Frank observing the relationship time caused a structural issue in the script, but the scene was seen as important and so the script was reworked around this idea.

Brooker imagined that the simulation would be run using cloud computing. The idea that it runs 1,000 copies of the world simultaneously was first considered for a previous episode "White Christmas". In the episode, a simulated copy of a person confesses to a crime. Someone asked Brooker whether this would be admissible evidence and he replied that the simulation could be repeated, with a slightly different setting each time, to increase reliability. For simulated couples who did not rebel, Brooker said "the system has served its purpose and your reality ends".

=== Casting and filming ===
American director Tim Van Patten directed the episode. Georgina Campbell was cast as Amy and Joe Cole was cast as Frank. The pair performed a chemistry test before filming, to check they could build a rapport. Campbell found Amy to be "full to the brim with hope", with a "nervous excitement" about dating.

The setting was based on Soho Farmhouse in Oxfordshire, an expensive holiday area where production designer Joel Collins had attended a birthday party. He described how an "electric milk float" transports people around their cabins and the various clubs and bars. The setting was rewritten around this—having previously been drafted as tower blocks—to resemble Soho Farmhouse, or a holiday village owned by Center Parcs. The geometric design of the world was Collins's idea, intended to resemble the inside of a mobile phone—where various copper and brass lines are arranged on a green plate. Hexagonal patterns and repeated design motifs are used in the scenery as the setting is an algorithmic simulated world. The interface for the Coach app was first designed by Erica McEwan of the graphics department of the production. Further development and animation was undertaken by Painting Practice. Collins said that the round design of Coach was made to distinguish the setting from the real world. Its interface was deliberately minimal, with few buttons; Collins called it "just a circular disc, almost like a discus, with a glass screen".

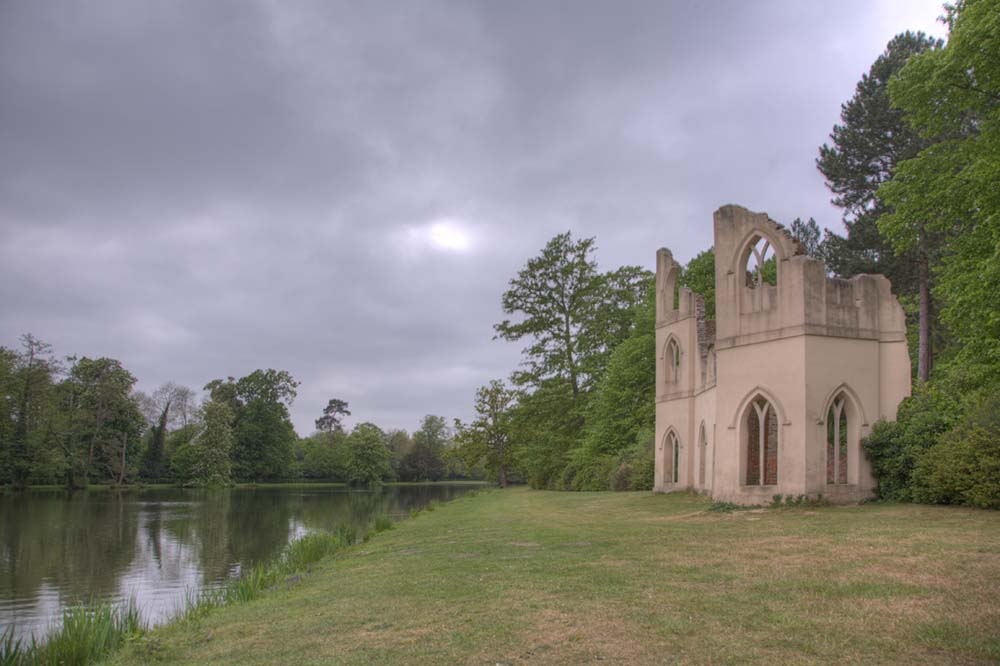
Painshill was used as a filming location.

Some exterior filming took place at Painshill, an eighteenth-century landscape park in Surrey. In one scene, Amy kicks Frank jokingly. However, Campbell's fake kicks looked unrealistic. Van Patten told Campbell to kick Cole for real and she accidentally kicked him hard enough for him to bleed—this was the shot that was used in the episode. Woodland scenes were filmed at Bourne Wood, Surrey.

The plot twist is revealed in a scene where the simulated world disassembles pixel by pixel to be replaced by 1,000 copies of Frank and Amy in a black void. This was only described vaguely in the script, so the production took inspiration from 2013 science fiction film Under the Skin, according to producer Nick Pitt. The cast were confused about the intention during filming for this ending, particularly the footage taken against green screens of characters looking "meaningfully into the middle distance". Jones and Brooker found that their partners did not understand the initial cuts of the ending. To establish that the episode's setting had been a simulation, disembodied voice and text reveal that Amy and Frank had "rebelled" 998 out of 1,000 times, leading to a 99.8% match for the pair, and dialogue in the previous restaurant scene was simplified. Additionally, visual effects developments led to characters "dematerialising" by a "graceful leaving of their body" rather than "being broken, squashed or incinerated", according to Pitt.

=== Music ===
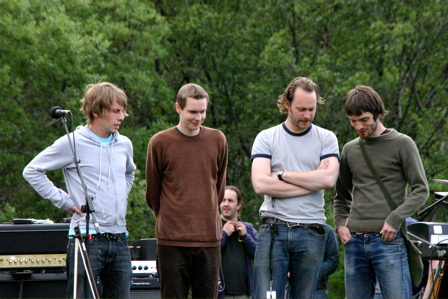
Sigur Rós worked on two tracks for the episode, "End" and "Match", with the composer Alex Somers.

The episode draws its name from a lyric in the Smiths' song "Panic", which plays in the final scene. The instrumental soundtrack for "Hang the DJ" was created by Alex Somers, with two pieces contributed by the Icelandic band Sigur Rós, "End" and "Match". The two songs are both ambient music: "End" is a five-minute structured piece featuring vocals by Jónsi, which Rolling Stone's Ryan Reed described as post-rock; "Match" is a 90-second segue with a dark tone and use of drones. Somers had previously produced music with the band, including on their most recent album Kveikur (2013). In 2018, the soundtrack was released on vinyl by Invada Records.

== Marketing ==
External videos
- Black Mirror – Hang the DJ; Trailer for "Hang the DJ"
- Black Mirror – Featurette: Hang the DJ; Commentary by Charlie Brooker

In May 2017, a Reddit post unofficially announced the names and directors of the six episodes in series 4 of Black Mirror. The first trailer for the series was released by Netflix on 25 August 2017, and contained the six episode titles. Beginning on 24 November 2017, Netflix published a series of daily posters and trailers for the fourth series, referred to as the "13 Days of Black Mirror". The poster for "Hang the DJ" was released on 30 November and the trailer premiered the following day. On 6 December, Netflix published a trailer featuring an amalgamation of scenes from the fourth series, which announced that the series would be released on 29 December.

== Analysis ==
The episode is a romantic comedy; its subject matter of finding a person their ideal match drew comparisons to other works. Jacob Oller of Paste and Louisa Mellor of Den of Geek compared it to The Lobster (2015), a film in which single people are coerced into finding relationships. Mellor and Vulture's Jen Chaney made comparisons to The Good Place (2016–2020), a television programme which begins with characters in the afterlife being matched with their soulmates. Other comparisons were made to media which revolve around a person being constantly monitored, such as the 1998 film The Truman Show and the 1949 novel Nineteen Eighty-Four. Mellor also saw the ending as like that of the film When Harry Met Sally... (1989), as "the couple who met right at the start end up together, and they're a near-perfect match".

Comparisons were also made to other Black Mirror episodes, particularly series three's "San Junipero". Kathryn VanArendonk of Vulture found that both episodes were intended as hopeful, and showed "love enabled by technological advancement and two people choosing one another over the world they know". Shirley Li of Entertainment Weekly saw similarities like "the star-crossed couple" and "the impossible parameters set around them" but also found "Hang the DJ" to be "more absurd, more sinister, and less optimistic and warm in its conclusion". Sophie Gilbert of The Atlantic saw the twist as also relating to other episodes featuring simulated people, including "USS Callister" and "White Christmas". Additionally, The Atlantic's Hannah Giorgis later compared it to the television anthology series Soulmates (2020), which also stars Campbell and was co-created by Black Mirror writer William Bridges. It follows a near-future in which there is a scientific basis for determining one's "soulmate" with complete accuracy. Giorgis wrote that in both works, "romantic tension is just a proxy for larger questions about safety, security, and belonging".

During "Hang the DJ", Frank suggests to Amy that they are in a simulation, which turns out to be correct. The setting initially presented to the audience raises many questions: Oller said that there are "so many strange and seemingly contradictory hints at the way the world works". Relevant initial questions, according to Gilbert, are: why the characters seem to "live inside some kind of sealed dome"; what happens if they opt out of the system; and "Why, given that Frank and Amy have so much obvious chemistry, isn't the system pairing them up for longer?" She described the location as having an "artificial-world sheen" similar to that seen in series three's "Nosedive". The Verge reviewer Lizzie Plaugic saw the setting as "flat and neutral" and suggested that its display of characters who "generally have nothing to do but kill time" was like that of "a Victorian-novel romance". Mellor saw this "simplicity" and "stylish emptiness" as logical for a "virtual world".

Tinder is an example of a dating application compared to the dating system in "Hang the DJ".

The episode relates to online dating. A Pew Research Center study around the time of the episode found that about a quarter of Americans in the age range 18–24 used dating applications. Vox's Abad-Santos listed Bumble, Grindr, Hinge, Scruff and Tinder as popular dating applications. Plaugic saw Coach as "not unlike" the world of dating applications, which "collect enough data to effectively push products at users, or predict human behavior", including apps "that collect data about your dates to determine whether you actually like them". Christopher Hooton, writing in The Independent, saw a parallel between Frank and Amy's dating and "people who put themselves on a conveyor belt of Tinder dates though they are still not truly over their exes". Gilbert found Amy's "sped-up montage of different relationships and sexual encounters as if outside her own body, detached and dehumanized" to be a possible "critique of Tinder".

Critics offered various suggestions of the episode's meaning. Abad-Santos saw the episode as embodying that "humans will put themselves through anything for that promise of being loved forever". Plaugic wrote that its "anxieties are related to social acceptance, loneliness, and the blank unknown of the future". Though Hooton saw the system as positive, saying the episode is "about how absolutely ingenious they could be in the future without us even really knowing exactly how they come to their conclusions viz. dating algorithms", Devon Maloney of Wired said that the system is "intentionally depressing for us as an audience", but marketed to characters "as a solution to the problems that plagued single people of yesteryear". Li opined that the episode shows dating applications both positively and negatively, as the romance of Frank and Amy "has already started off artificially". Zach Handlen of The A.V. Club thought that the audience feels a "tension between the fantasy of a world where someone else makes the messy decisions for you, and the reflexive concern that this has to be a trap". Writing in Den of Geek, Alec Bojalad found Amy and Frank to be "perfect for each other", as they share a sense of humour and "a clear physical connection". Catherine Gee of The Telegraph saw them as similarly "sweet" and "goofy" with a fondness for "bad jokes". Abad-Santos interpreted their reaction to each other in the real world as "a wink and a smile, and the flicker of true love". VanArendonk analysed the lyrics "hang the DJ" as "a celebration of fighting the power and doing it for yourself".

== Reception ==
Though rated highly according to some metrics, the episode received mixed reception for its storyline and final twist, along with acclaim for the acting and characterisation of Frank and Amy. On the review aggregator Rotten Tomatoes, the episode has a 92% score based on 24 critics, reflecting universal acclaim. The site's summary describes it as "surprisingly sweet and satisfyingly slight" and with "a welcome dose of optimism". It received a five-star rating in Den of Geek, a four-star rating from The Telegraph and ratings of A− in Entertainment Weekly and The A.V. Club, but a more ambivalent rating of 6.2 out of 10 in Paste. Maloney praised that it "perfectly captures the modern desperation of trusting algorithms to find us love" and found it moving enough to cry at the ending. Handlen and Thrillist's Sean Fitz-Gerald experienced the ending more positively, calling it "a happy ending that still manages to be slightly unexpected" and a "refreshing dose of optimism ... that shows this anthology is still at its best when it dares to take risks", respectively.

The storyline received ambivalent reception. Abad-Santos found it "a testament to the episode's storytelling" that the viewer is "attuned" to "the rhythms and structure of the dating app" by the time Frank and Amy choose not to view their expiry date. Gee said that "without being preachy", the story "is more than what it first appears". Writing in The Guardian, Bakare praised the sex scenes as "easily the funniest thing" in the fourth series. While Gilbert thought it "sagged a little in the middle", Mellor found it "develops into a strong story" over its runtime and Gee thought it was too short, at 51 minutes in length. Plaugic critiqued it as "intriguing, amusing, and sweet" but "not nearly as insightful" as the previous episode "Be Right Back". Hooton said the "in-app world doesn't feel very rich and fully realised".

The twist received mixed reception. Critics such as Bakare praised it. Gilbert said it made the episode "more intriguing" and praised a "masterfully structured" set of hints "at a larger conspiracy" throughout the episode. Mellor concurred that it was "cleverly seeded", such as with Amy's comment about stones skipping four times, and enjoyed the "impressive and poetic visual moments" with the endless ladder and 1,000 copies of Frank and Amy. However, VanArendonk saw a contradiction between the storyline and the message of rebellion: "The characters who actually make a choice ... get destroyed" and "in real life, Amy and Frank looked down at their phones and trusted an algorithm ... We have to root for them to blindly do whatever their phones tell them to do". Bojalad saw this not to be a negative, writing that "the best part" of the episode "is how the tonal and thematic experiences remain the same before and after its twist", because "in both realities ... falling in love is the same. It's the experience of rebellion". However, more negative reception to the twist came from Oller, who said it is "undermining its own reveal with its very nature". Handlen found it "a little too neat" and "closed off" for not questioning the feelings or rights of the simulated people. Maloney said it was "admittedly clever" but "can't quite bury the despair" of the work.

Campbell and Cole's acting garnered praise. Fitz-Gerald called their acting "stellar". Gilbert praised them for a "genuine rapport" and Bojalad for "excellent onscreen chemistry"; Mellor wrote that the "chemistry between two very likeable and charismatic leads" is "what really sells this episode". Abad-Santos reviewed that they "anchor the story" and show a vulnerability to each character. Handlen saw the writing, acting and directing as combining to "immediately, but not forcefully, [establish] that these two make a good match". However, Hooton saw that some of the dialogue "dials up the awkwardness way too much" so that the characters "feel more like parodies of millennials than actual ones". Additionally, the soundtrack was praised: Hooton lauded it as "incredible", while Maloney wrote that it was used to enhance "the tenderness" between Frank and Amy in their second relationship.

=== Episode rankings ===
"Hang the DJ" was ranked as follows on critics' lists of the 23 instalments of Black Mirror by quality, from best to worst:

- 4th – Corey Atad, Esquire
- 6th – James Hibberd, Entertainment Weekly
- 6th – Morgan Jeffery, Digital Spy
- 8th – Ed Power, The Telegraph
- 9th – Matt Donnelly and Tim Molloy, TheWrap
- 10th – Aubrey Page, Collider
- 12th – Travis Clark, Business Insider
- 14th – Charles Bramesco, Vulture

IndieWire authors ranked the 22 Black Mirror instalments excluding Bandersnatch by quality, giving "Hang the DJ" a position of 7th. Eric Anthony Glover of Entertainment Tonight found the episode to be 14th-best of the 19 episodes from series one to four. Instead of by quality, Proma Khosla of Mashable ranked the episodes by tone, concluding that "Hang the DJ" is the least pessimistic episode of the show.

Other reviewers ranked "Hang the DJ" against other series four episodes:

- 1st – Christopher Hooton, Jacob Stolworthy, The Independent
- 1st (grade: A) – TVLine

=== Accolades ===
"Hang the DJ" was nominated for four awards: three British Academy Television Awards (BAFTAs) and a Black Reel Award.

Awards and nominations received by "Hang the DJ"
Year	Award	Category	Recipients	Result	Ref.
2018	BAFTA Awards	Best Single Drama	"Hang the DJ"	Nominated	
2018	BAFTA Awards	Best Actor	Joe Cole	Nominated	
2018	BAFTA Craft Awards	Writer: Drama	Charlie Brooker	Nominated	
2018	Black Reel Awards	Outstanding Actress, TV Movie or Limited Series	Georgina Campbell	Nominated	

== See also ==
- Love Alarm – a South Korean streaming television series with a similar plot.
