= Charlie Brooker's Gameswipe =

- Genre: Narrative journalism/Video Game review
- Created by: Charlie Brooker
- Presented by: Charlie Brooker
- Opening theme: "A.M. 180" by Grandaddy
- Country of origin: United Kingdom
- Original language: English

Production
- Running time: 50 minutes
- Production company: Zeppotron

Original release
- Network: BBC Four
- Release: September 2009

Related
- Charlie Brooker's Screenwipe; Newswipe with Charlie Brooker; How TV Ruined Your Life; Charlie Brooker's Weekly Wipe

Charlie Brooker's Gameswipe is a special one-off British, video game culture show by Charlie Brooker, broadcast in September 2009 during the BBC's Technology season. Following on from Brooker's Screenwipe and Newswipe, Gameswipe featured reviews of video games and consoles as well as an insight into the video game industry.

== Format ==
The one-off special was very similar to its predecessors in that Brooker, along with a camera and various games consoles, reviewed and previewed video games in the same style as Screenwipe. Brooker claimed that it would attempt to prove that video games can be just as engaging as television and just as dumb. He said to "expect pixels, joypads, some of the world's weirdest games, celebrity cameos and the occasional sound effect".

In the show, Brooker reviews Wolfenstein, 50 Cent: Blood on the Sand and The Beatles: Rock Band. The show also contains contributions from Dara Ó Briain, Robert Florence, Ryan Macleod, "Guru Larry" Bundy Jr, Rebecca Mayes and Graham Linehan.

== Reception ==
The first showing of Gameswipe drew 361,000 viewers, outdoing the typical performances of both Screenwipe and Newswipe. The UK video games trade magazine MCV said of the show, "It's fair to say that the reaction from the industry to last night's TV debut of Charlie Brooker's Gameswipe was mixed. But if its intention was to offer an informed, reasoned and mature take on the games industry of both past and present, then it's hard to regard the show as anything other than an overwhelming success."

== The future ==
In October 2009, Brooker told MCV that he would consider working on either a further episode of Gameswipe or, potentially, a brand new series, though he added that he himself may choose not to present the show.

== See also ==
- Charlie Brooker's How Videogames Changed the World
