= How TV Ruined Your Life =

Television series

- Genre: Satire
- Written by: Charlie Brooker
- Presented by: Charlie Brooker
- Country of origin: United Kingdom
- Original language: English
- No. of series: 1
- No. of episodes: 6

Production
- Executive producer: Annabel Jones
- Running time: 30 minutes
- Production company: Zeppotron

Original release
- Network: BBC Two
- Release: 25 January – 8 March 2011

Related
- Charlie Brooker's Screenwipe; Newswipe with Charlie Brooker; Charlie Brooker's Gameswipe; Charlie Brooker's Weekly Wipe

How TV Ruined Your Life is a British satirical television series written and presented by Charlie Brooker. Brooker, whose earlier TV-related programmes include How to Watch Television, Charlie Brooker's Screenwipe and You Have Been Watching, examines how the medium has bent reality to fit its own ends. Produced by Zeppotron, the series aired its first episode in January 2011.

== Reception ==
The series was reviewed mildly positively, with some criticism of the series' topic, some positive remarks about specific segments, and some abuse in jest from Brooker's colleagues at The Guardian: "Ha! I mean, boo! I hate him." In the Scotsman, it was noted that "though so far Brooker hasn't been pulling any punches", some of Brooker's topics were deemed too broad, some of his targets were called "too familiar", and Brooker himself "may be heading towards one of those programmes he has so savagely parodied." The Metro enjoyed Brooker's making "merrily sardonic hay", and found his skewering of some TV fearmongering "spot on", but found his targets pretty easy, "nicking TV news ('like looking directly in the face of terror') with flesh-wounds when once upon a time he would have gone for the heart", and described the show as "cobbled together."

== Episodes ==
No.	Title	Written by	Original release date
1	"Fear"	Charlie Brooker	25 January 2011
Brooker discusses early public information films, criticising them for their often patronising and hysterical tones before comparing them to the more dramatic recent equivalents.
2	"The Lifecycle"	Charlie Brooker	1 February 2011
Brooker looks into how television is marketed towards different age groups, paying particular attention to how marketing towards the latter group has changed over the years.
3	"Aspiration"	Charlie Brooker	8 February 2011
Brooker defines "aspirational television" and credits the origin of this style of idealised TV to advertisers "attaching fantasies to the products they were hawking", comparing adverts between decades. Brooker also comments on the shifting portrayal of wealthy people and the protective idolization of children.
4	"Love"	Charlie Brooker	15 February 2011
This episode covers the depiction of romantic and sexual love on TV.
5	"Progress"	Charlie Brooker	1 March 2011
Brooker discusses human technological progress and how it and aspirations of it are shown on TV.
6	"Knowledge"	Charlie Brooker	8 March 2011
This episode is about informative TV. Brooker begins by illustrating clichés of "documentary-type" presenters such as Andrew Marr. He comments on early programmes which introduced TV to the classroom.

== See also ==
- Charlie Brooker's Screenwipe
- Newswipe with Charlie Brooker
