= Charlie Brooker =

English writer and TV personality

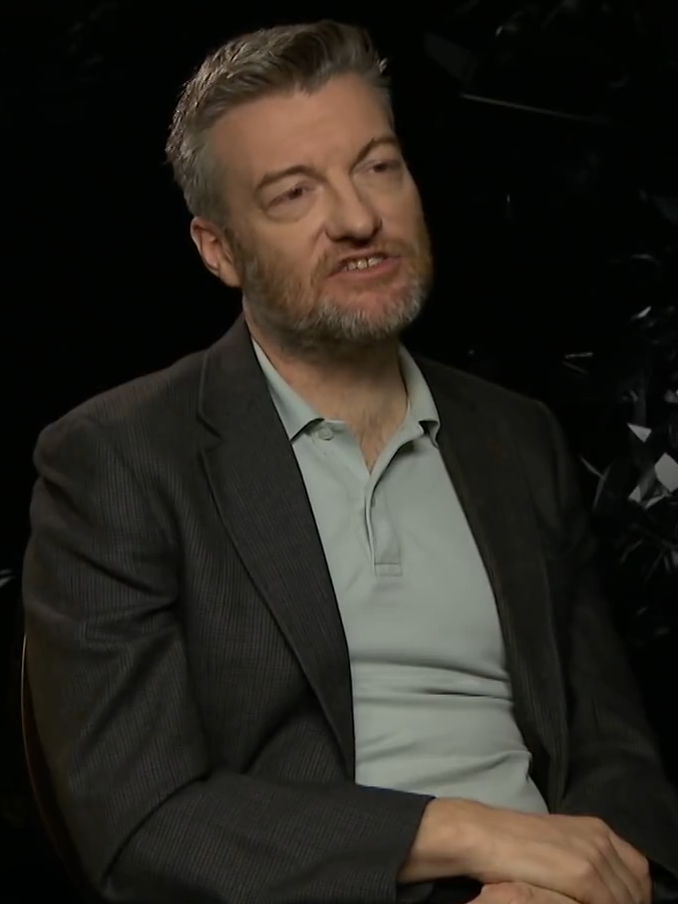
- Brooker in December 2017
- Born: Charlton Brooker; 3 March 1971 (age 55); Reading, Berkshire, England
- Occupations: Screenwriter; producer; presenter; author; cartoonist; social critic
- Years active: 1987–present
- Spouse: Konnie Huq (m. 2010)
- Children: 2

Charlton Brooker (born 3 March 1971) is an English screenwriter, producer, presenter, author, cartoonist, and social critic. He first became known for creating and presenting satirical television shows that featured criticism of modern society and the media, such as Screenwipe, Gameswipe, Newswipe, and Weekly Wipe.

Brooker came to wider prominence as the creator, writer, and executive producer of the dystopian anthology series Black Mirror. His other work includes writing for comedy series such as Brass Eye, Cunk on Earth, The 11 O'Clock Show, and Nathan Barley, creating the horror drama series Dead Set, writing social criticism pieces for The Guardian, co-founding and designing the logo for second-hand retailer CeX, and serving as a creative director for the production company Zeppotron.

== Early life ==
Charlton Brooker was born on 3 March 1971 in Reading, Berkshire. He grew up in a "relaxed" Quaker household in Brightwell-cum-Sotwell, Oxfordshire. His parents, who were fans of the sitcom Bewitched, named him Charlton after a character featured in one episode and his sister Samantha after the show's main character. As a teenager, he first worked as a writer and cartoonist for Oink!

After attending Wallingford School, Brooker attended the University of Westminster (known as the Polytechnic of Central London until his final year there) to study for a Bachelor of Arts in Media Studies; he later revealed that he did not graduate because he wrote his dissertation on video games, considered an unacceptable topic for a dissertation. He has listed his comedic influences as Monty Python, The Young Ones, Blackadder, Chris Morris, and Vic Reeves.

Brooker did some early work as a cartoonist and worked in the video game department of Music and Video Exchange, a retailer in Notting Hill Gate. He and some other employees left to co-found the second-hand retailer CeX. Brooker worked in their first shop and produced cartoon advertisements, and designed their logo.

== Career ==
=== Print ===
After some of Brooker's CeX cartoons were printed in the magazine PC Zone, he was invited to write for the magazine. His early reviews included System Shock (1994) and Fallout (1997). Brooker wrote for the magazine throughout the mid- to late-1990s. Aside from games reviews, his output included the comic strip "Cybertwats" and a column titled "Sick Notes", where Brooker would insult anyone who wrote in to the magazine – and offered a £50 prize to the best letter.

One of Brooker's one-shot cartoons caused the magazine to be pulled from the shelves of many British newsagents. The cartoon was titled "Helmut Werstler's Cruelty Zoo" and professed to be an advert for a theme park created by a Teutonic psychologist for children to take out their violent impulses on animals rather than humans. It was accompanied by photoshopped pictures of children smashing the skulls of monkeys with hammers, jumping on a badger with a pitchfork, and chainsawing an orang-utan, among other things. The original joke was supposed to be at the expense of the Tomb Raider games, known at the time for the number of animals killed, but the original title, "Lara Croft's Cruelty Zoo", was changed for legal reasons. In October 2008, Brooker and several other ex-writers were invited back to review a game for the 200th issue. Brooker reviewed Euro Truck Simulator.

Brooker began writing a TV review column titled "Screen Burn" for The Guardian newspaper's Saturday entertainment supplement The Guide in 2000, a role he continued until October 2010.

From late 2005, he wrote a regular series of columns in The Guardian supplement "G2" on Fridays called "Supposing", in which he free-associated on a set of vague what-if themes. From October 2006 this column was expanded into a full-page section on Mondays, including samples from TVGoHome and Ignopedia, an occasional series of pseudo-articles on topics mostly suggested by readers. The key theme behind Ignopedia was that, while Wikipedia is written and edited by thousands of users, Ignopedia would be written by a single sub-par person with little or no awareness of the facts.

On 24 October 2004, he wrote a column on George W. Bush and the forthcoming 2004 US presidential election which concluded, "John Wilkes Booth, Lee Harvey Oswald, John Hinckley Jr. – where are you now that we need you?" that was criticised for Brooker's apparent encouragement of the assassination of the American president. The Guardian withdrew the article from its website and published and endorsed an apology by Brooker. He has since commented about the remark in the column stating:

I ended a Screen Burn column by recycling a very old tasteless joke (a variant of a graffiti I first saw during the Thatcher years), and within minutes half the internet seemed convinced The Guardian was officially calling for assassination. My inbox overflowed with blood-curdling death threats, and it was all very unfunny indeed – a bit like recounting a rude joke at a dinner party, only to be told you hadn't recounted a joke at all, but molested the host's children, and suddenly everyone was punching you and you weren't going to get any pudding. I've had better weekends.

Brooker left the "Screen Burn" column in 2010. In the final column, he noted how increasingly difficult he found it to reconcile his role in mainstream media and TV production with his writing as a scabrous critic or to objectively criticise those he increasingly worked and socialised with. Longtime covering contributor Grace Dent took over the column. He continued to contribute other articles to The Guardian on a regular basis, his most recent comment column appearing in May 2015.

In 2012, he contributed to the book Behind the Sofa: Celebrity Memories of Doctor Who.

In 2014, an article he wrote for The Guardian—"Too much talk for one planet: why I'm reducing my word emissions"—was published in the A-Level anthology Voices in Speech and Writing: An Anthology.

=== Online ===
From 1999 to 2003, Brooker wrote the satirical TVGoHome website, a regular series of mock TV schedules published in a format similar to that of the Radio Times, consisting of a combination of savage satire and surreal humour and featured in technology newsletter Need To Know. A print adaptation of the site was published by Fourth Estate in 2001. A TV sketch show based on the site was broadcast on UK digital station E4 the same year.

In May 2012, Brooker was interviewed for Richard Herring's Leicester Square Theatre Podcast series. In 2019, he made a second appearance on the podcast, which was released during March 2020.

=== Television ===
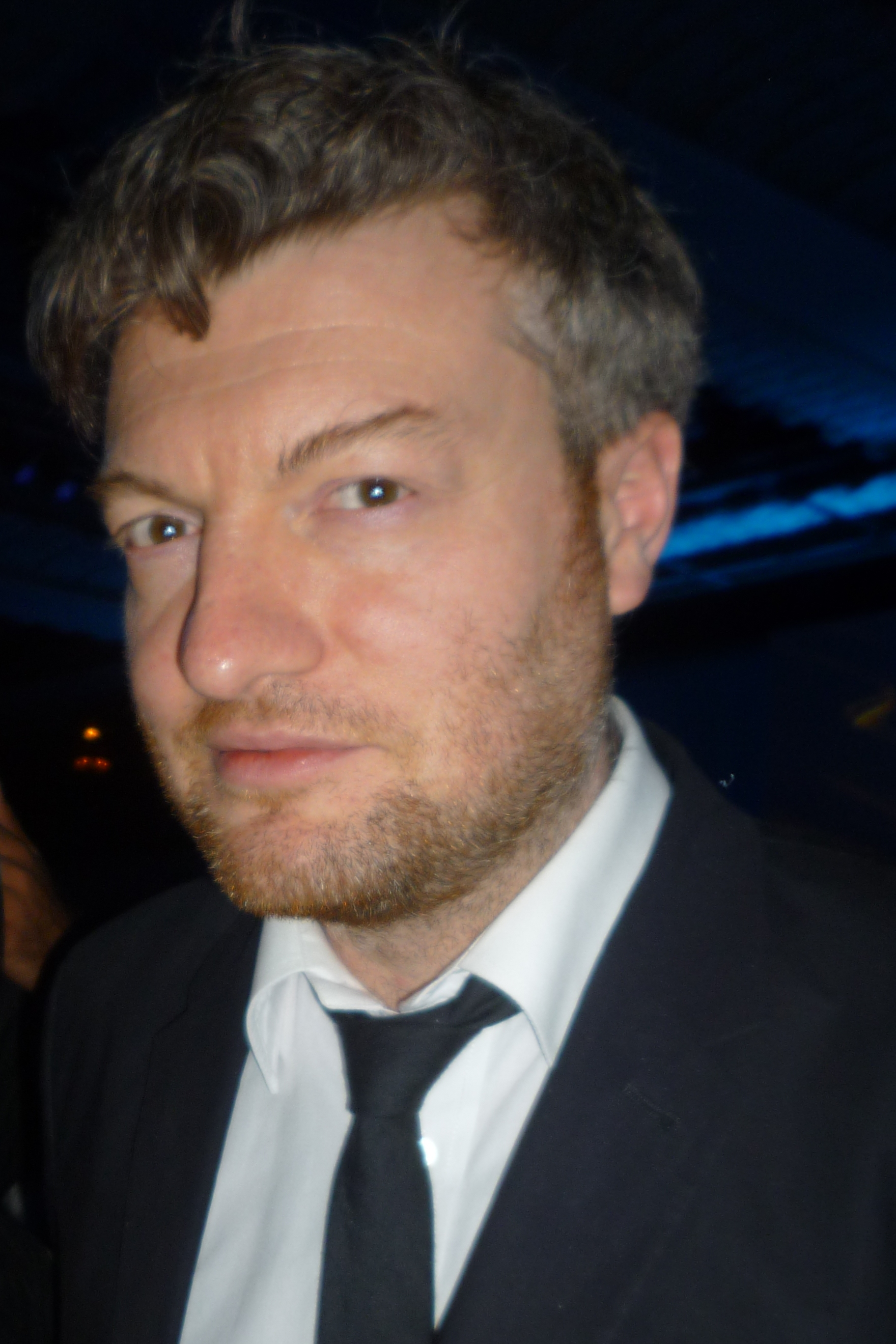
Brooker in 2011

Brooker's television presenting debut was with Gia Milinovich on BBC Knowledge's The Kit (1999–2000), a programme that reviewed gadgets and technology. From 1999 to 2000, Brooker played the hooded expert 'the Pundit' in the short-lived show Games Republic, hosted by Trevor and Simon on BSkyB.

In 2000, Brooker was one of the writers of the Channel 4 show The 11 O'Clock Show. In 2001, he was one of several writers on "Paedogeddon", Channel 4's Brass Eye special on the subject of paedophilia. In 2003, Brooker wrote an episode entitled "How to Watch Television" for Channel 4's The Art Show. The episode was presented in the style of a public information film and was partly animated.

Together with Brass Eye's Chris Morris, Brooker co-wrote the sitcom Nathan Barley, based on a character from one of TVGoHome's fictional programmes. The show was broadcast in 2005 and focused on the lives of a group of London media 'trendies'. The same year, he was also on the writing team of the Channel 4 sketch show Spoons, produced by Zeppotron.

==== Wipe series ====
In 2006, Brooker began writing and presenting the television series Charlie Brooker's Screenwipe on BBC Four, a TV review programme in a similar style to his Screen Burn columns in The Guardian. After an initial pilot series of three editions in April, the programme returned later in the year for a second run of four episodes plus Christmas and Review of the Year specials in December 2006. A third series followed in February 2007 with a fourth broadcast in September 2007, followed by a Review of the Year in December 2007. The fifth series started in November 2008 and was followed by another Review of the Year special. This series was also the first to be given a primetime repeat on terrestrial television (BBC Two), in January 2009.

Screenwipe editions have had themes including American television, TV news, advertising and children's programmes. The last of these involved a segment where Brooker joined the cast of Toonattik for one week, playing the character of "Angry News Guy". An episode on scriptwriting saw several of British television's most prominent writers interviewed by Brooker.

Newswipe with Charlie Brooker, a similar show concerned with current affairs reporting by the international news media, began on BBC Four on 25 March 2009. A second series began on 19 January 2010. He has also written and presented the one-off special Gameswipe on video games and aired on BBC Four on 29 September 2009.

Brooker's 2010 Wipe, a review of 2010, was broadcast in December 2010. The end-of-year Wipe specials continued annually, the last one to date broadcast on 29 December 2016. Due to Brooker's commitments to Black Mirror and other projects, the annual Wipe went on hiatus beginning in 2017.

Charlie Brooker's Weekly Wipe was first broadcast on BBC Two on 31 January 2013. It was an amalgam of Screenwipe and Newswipe, with sections that dealt with recent news, television shows and films. Along with the regular cast, it also featured guests who discuss recent events. Two more series followed in 2014 and 2015. A 60-minute special, Election Wipe, aired on 6 May 2015, examined events running up to the 2015 general election.

A 45-minute BBC Two special, Charlie Brooker's Antiviral Wipe, aired on 14 May 2020. It concerned life during the COVID-19 pandemic in the United Kingdom. It was produced during the UK lockdown, which had caused a series starring Wipe character Philomena Cunk to be postponed. Most of the crew from the series transferred to work on Antiviral Wipe. Brooker initially turned down the offer to make the special but accepted when it was clear that production would be largely unchanged, as the format of the series required few characters to appear on screen together and made extensive use of archive footage. The editing process was the most affected aspect of production.

Brooker often signs off his programmes by saying "Thank you for watching. Now go away."

==== Dead Set ====
Brooker wrote Dead Set, a five-part zombie horror thriller for E4 set in the Big Brother house. The show was broadcast in October 2008 to coincide with Halloween and was repeated on Channel 4 in January 2009 to coincide with Celebrity Big Brother, and again for Halloween later that year. It was produced by Zeppotron, which also produced Screenwipe.

Brooker told MediaGuardian.co.uk it comprised a "mixture of known and less well known faces" and "Dead Set is very different to anything I've done before, and I hope the end result will surprise, entertain and appall people in equal measure." He added that he has long been a fan of horror films and that his new series "could not be described as a comedy". "I couldn't really describe what it is but it will probably surprise people," Brooker said, adding that he plans to "continue as normal" with his print journalism.

Jaime Winstone starred as a runner on the TV programme, and Big Brother presenter Davina McCall guest starred as herself. Dead Set received a BAFTA nomination for Best Drama Serial.

==== Black Mirror ====
In December 2011, three episodes of Brooker's Black Mirror, a science fiction anthology series, aired on Channel 4 to largely positive reviews. As well as creating the show, Brooker wrote the first episode and co-wrote the second with his wife Konnie Huq. He also wrote all three episodes of series two. In September 2015, Netflix commissioned a third season of 12 episodes, with Channel 4 losing the rights to the programme. A trailer for the third season was released in October 2016. This was later split into two series of six episodes. The third season was released on Netflix worldwide on 21 October 2016. Brooker has solely written four of the episodes in series three, and has co-written the remaining two.

The fourth season was released in December 2017, followed by a full-length interactive film Bandersnatch in December 2018. The fifth season was released in June 2019.

The series is produced by Zeppotron for Endemol. Regarding the programme's content and structure, Brooker noted, "each episode has a different cast, a different setting, even a different reality. But they're all about the way we live now – and the way we might be living in 10 minutes' time if we're clumsy."

An Endemol press release describes the series as "a hybrid of The Twilight Zone and Tales of the Unexpected which taps into our contemporary unease about our modern world", with the stories having a "techno-paranoia" feel. Channel 4 describes the first episode as "a twisted parable for the Twitter age".

Brooker explained the series' title to The Guardian, noting: "If technology is a drug – and it does feel like a drug – then what, precisely, are the side-effects? This area – between delight and discomfort – is where Black Mirror, my new drama series, is set. The 'black mirror' of the title is the one you'll find on every wall, on every desk, in the palm of every hand: the cold, shiny screen of a TV, a monitor, a smartphone."

Several news reports, including one by Chris Cillizza, political reporter for The Washington Post, compared the 2016 Donald Trump political campaign to "The Waldo Moment", a 2013 episode of the Black Mirror TV series; later, in September 2016, Brooker also compared the Trump campaign to the episode and rightly predicted Trump would win the 2016 election.

==== Other television work and appearances ====
With Daniel Maier, Brooker co-wrote a spoof crime drama for Sky1 called A Touch of Cloth, which first broadcast on 26 August 2012 and starred John Hannah and Suranne Jones, both notable for having starred in genuine crime dramas. Two further series were broadcast in 2013 and 2014, with the latter starring Karen Gillan.

Brooker has appeared on three episodes and one webisode of the popular BBC current affairs news quiz Have I Got News for You. He appeared on an episode of the Channel 4 panel show 8 Out of 10 Cats, The Big Fat Quiz of the Year 2009, Never Mind the Buzzcocks and Would I Lie To You?. In December 2006 he reviewed two games written by the presenters of VideoGaiden, on their show. He also made a brief appearance in the third and final instalment of the documentary series Games Britannia, discussing the rise and popularity of computer games.

Brooker wrote for the BBC Three sketch show Rush Hour.

In 2009, Brooker began hosting You Have Been Watching, a panel comedy TV quiz on Channel 4 which discusses television. A second series was broadcast the following year.

On 6 May 2010, Brooker was a co-host of the Channel 4 alternative election night, along with David Mitchell, Jimmy Carr and Lauren Laverne. The telethon was interspersed with contributions from Brooker, some live in the studio but mostly pre-recorded. Notably, these included an "Election Special" of You Have Been Watching and two smaller segments in an almost identical style to Screenwipe (the only noticeable difference being that Brooker was sitting in a different room). Brooker described the experience of live television as being so nerve-wracking he "did a piss" during the broadcast. A spin-off series, 10 O'Clock Live, started in January 2011 with the same four hosts.

Brooker hosted How TV Ruined Your Life, which aired on BBC Two between January and March 2011.

In November 2020, Hugh Grant reported that Brooker was producing a mockumentary with Netflix "about 2020". Grant stated that he would star as "a historian who is being interviewed about the year." The mockumentary, titled Death to 2020, was released on Netflix on 27 December 2020.

In 2022, the animated interactive fiction Cat Burglar was released. Brooker was credited as creator.

=== Radio ===
From 2010 to 2012, Brooker presented a BBC Radio 4 series celebrating failure titled So Wrong It's Right, in which guests compete to pitch the worst possible ideas for new franchises and give the "most wrong" answer to a question. It aired 17 episodes across three series. In common with Screenwipe's use of a Grandaddy track (A.M. 180) from the album Under the Western Freeway as its theme tune, So Wrong It's Right uses another track from the same album, Summer Here Kids.

In January 2018, he was the guest on BBC Radio 4's Desert Island Discs.

== Personal life ==
Brooker became engaged to television presenter Konnie Huq after dating for nine months, having met while filming an episode of Screenwipe. They married on 26 July 2010 at the Little White Wedding Chapel in Las Vegas. They have two sons.

Brooker is an atheist and contributed to The Atheist's Guide to Christmas. Due to his family's background, he has also described himself as a Quaker.

== Awards and nominations ==
For his work as creator and screenwriter of Black Mirror, Brooker won three consecutive Primetime Emmy Awards for Outstanding Television Movie and two consecutive for Outstanding Writing for a Limited Series, Movie, or Dramatic Special.

Brooker won the 2009 Columnist of the Year award at the British Press Awards for his Guardian column. Dead Set was nominated for the 2009 Best Drama Serial BAFTA. In 2010, he was given the Best Entertainment Programme Award for Newswipe from the Royal Television Society. He has received three British Comedy Awards: Best Newcomer in 2009, Best Comedy Entertainment Show Award for Newswipe in 2011 and Best Comedy Entertainment Personality in 2012. At the BAFTA TV Awards 2017, his show Charlie Brooker's 2016 Wipe won for Best Comedy and Comedy Entertainment Programme.

Year	Award	Category	Nominated work	Result
2007	Royal Television Society Awards	Digital Channel Programme	Charlie Brooker's Screenwipe	Nominated
2008	Royal Television Society Awards	Digital Channel Programme	Charlie Brooker's Screenwipe	Nominated
2009	Royal Television Society Awards	Digital Channel Programme	Charlie Brooker's Screenwipe	Won
2010	Royal Television Society Awards	Best Entertainment Performance	Newswipe with Charlie Brooker	Won
2011	Royal Television Society Awards	Best Entertainment Performance	Newswipe with Charlie Brooker	Nominated
2013	Royal Television Society Awards	Best Entertainment Performance	10 O'Clock Live	Nominated
2014	Royal Television Society Awards	Scripted Comedy	A Touch of Cloth Part II	Nominated
2016	Royal Television Society Awards	Best Single Drama	Black Mirror: White Christmas	Nominated
2018	Royal Television Society Awards	The Judges Award	Black Mirror	Won
2021	Royal Television Society Awards	Comedy Entertainment	Charlie Brooker’s Antiviral Wipe	Nominated
2009	British Academy Television Awards	Best Drama Serial	Dead Set	Nominated
2010	British Academy Television Awards	Best Entertainment Programme	Newswipe with Charlie Brooker	Nominated
2012	British Academy Television Awards	Best Comedy Programme	Charlie Brooker's 2011 Wipe	Nominated
2014	British Academy Television Awards	Best Single Drama	Black Mirror: Be Right Back	Nominated
2014	British Academy Television Awards	Best Entertainment Programme	10 O'Clock Live	Nominated
2015	British Academy Television Awards	Best Comedy and Comedy Entertainment Programme	Charlie Brooker's Weekly Wipe	Nominated
2016	British Academy Television Awards	Best Comedy and Comedy Entertainment Programme	Charlie Brooker's Election Wipe	Nominated
2017	British Academy Television Awards	Best Comedy and Comedy Entertainment Programme	Cunk on Shakespeare	Nominated
2017	British Academy Television Awards	Best Comedy and Comedy Entertainment Programme	Charlie Brooker's 2016 Wipe	Won
2018	British Academy Television Awards	Best Single Drama	Black Mirror: Hang the DJ	Nominated
2019	British Academy Television Awards	Best Single Drama	Black Mirror: Bandersnatch	Nominated
2021	British Academy Television Awards	Comedy Entertainment Programme	Screenwipe: Antiviral Wipe	Nominated
2024	British Academy Television Awards	Limited Drama	Black Mirror: Demon 79	Nominated
2009	British Academy Television Craft Awards	Breakthrough Talent	Dead Set	Nominated
2018	British Academy Television Craft Awards	Writer: Drama	Black Mirror: Hang the DJ	Nominated
2021	British Academy Television Craft Awards	Writer: Comedy	Screenwipe: Antiviral Wipe	Nominated
2024	British Academy Television Craft Awards	Writer: Drama	Black Mirror: Demon 79	Won
2017	Primetime Emmy Awards	Outstanding Television Movie	Black Mirror: San Junipero	Won
2017	Primetime Emmy Awards	Outstanding Writing for a Limited Series, Movie or a Dramatic Special	Black Mirror: San Junipero	Won
2018	Primetime Emmy Awards	Outstanding Television Movie	Black Mirror: USS Callister	Won
2018	Primetime Emmy Awards	Outstanding Writing for a Limited Series, Movie or a Dramatic Special	Black Mirror: USS Callister	Won
2019	Primetime Emmy Awards	Outstanding Television Movie	Black Mirror: Bandersnatch	Won
2019	Primetime Emmy Awards	Outstanding Creative Achievement In Interactive Media Within A Scripted Program	Black Mirror: Bandersnatch	Won
2024	Primetime Emmy Awards	Outstanding Writing for a Limited or Anthology Series or Movie	Black Mirror: Joan is Awful	Nominated
2025	Primetime Emmy Awards	Outstanding Writing for a Limited or Anthology Series or Movie	Black Mirror: Common People	Nominated
2013	Broadcast Awards	Best Single Drama	Black Mirror: The National Anthem	Nominated
2014	Broadcast Awards	Best Comedy Programme	A Touch of Cloth Part II	Won
2016	Broadcast Awards	Best Single Drama	Black Mirror: White Christmas	Nominated
2018	Broadcast Awards	Best Single Drama	Black Mirror: San Junipero	Won
2018	Broadcast Awards	Best Comedy Programme	Cunk on Christmas	Nominated
2024	Broadcast Awards	Best Single Drama	Black Mirror: Demon 79	Nominated
2009	British Comedy Awards	Best Male Comedy Newcomer	You Have Been Watching	Won
2009	British Comedy Awards	Best Television Comedy Drama	Dead Set	Nominated
2010	British Comedy Awards	Best Comedy Entertainment Personality	Newswipe	Nominated
2011	British Comedy Awards	Best Male TV Comic	10 O'Clock Live, How TV Ruined Your Life	Nominated
2011	British Comedy Awards	Best Comedy Entertainment Personality	10 O'Clock Live, How TV Ruined Your Life	Nominated
2012	British Comedy Awards	Best Comedy Entertainment Personality	---	Won
2017	Hugo Awards	Best Dramatic Presentation Short Form	Black Mirror: San Junipero	Nominated
2018	Hugo Awards	Best Dramatic Presentation Short Form	Black Mirror: USS Callister	Nominated
2017	PGA Awards	Outstanding Producer of Long-Form Television	Black Mirror Season 3	Nominated
2018	PGA Awards	Outstanding Producer of Long-Form Television	Black Mirror Season 4	Won
2020	PGA Awards	Innovation in Broadcasting Award	Black Mirror: Bandersnatch	Nominated
2020	PGA Awards	Outstanding Producer of Streamed or Televised Motion Pictures	Black Mirror: Striking Vipers	Nominated
2024	PGA Awards	Outstanding Producer of Streamed or Televised Motion Pictures	Black Mirror: Beyond the Sea	Won
2009	TV Quick Awards	Best New Drama	Dead Set	Nominated
2009	Broadcasting Press Guild Awards	Best Multichannel Programme	Dead Set	Nominated
2019	Broadcasting Press Guild Awards	Innovation in Broadcasting	Black Mirror: Bandersnatch	Won
2012	International Emmy Awards	TV Movie/Mini-Series	Black Mirror	Won
2012	Rose d'Or Awards	Best Comedy	Black Mirror	Won
2018	Rose d'Or Awards	Best Comedy	Cunk on Britain	Nominated
2018	Rose d'Or Awards	Best Limited Series	Black Mirror Season 4	Nominated
2014	Peabody Awards	Entertainment	Black Mirror: Season 2	Won
2017	GLAAD Media Awards	Outstanding Individual Episode (in a series without a regular LGBT character)	Black Mirror: San Junipero	Won
2016	Rondo Hatton Classic Horror Awards	Best Television Presentation	Black Mirror	Nominated
2017	Rondo Hatton Classic Horror Awards	Best Television Presentation	Black Mirror	Nominated
2018	Rondo Hatton Classic Horror Awards	Best Television Presentation	Black Mirror: Bandersnatch	Nominated
2019	Rondo Hatton Classic Horror Awards	Best Television Presentation	Black Mirror: Smithereens	Nominated
2018	Black Reel Awards for Television	Outstanding TV Movie/Limited Series	Black Mirror	Nominated
2018	C21 International Drama Awards	Best TV Movie	Black Mirror: San Junipero	Won
2019	C21 International Drama Awards	Best TV Movie	Black Mirror: USS Callister	Won
2019	Etna Comics International Film Festival	Brent Cross-Media Artist	Black Mirror: Bandersnatch	Nominated
2022	Children's & Family Emmy Awards	Outstanding Interactive Media	Cat Burglar	Nominated

== Filmography ==
Title	Year	Writer	Producer	Appeared	Role	Notes
The 11 O'Clock Show	1999–2000	Yes	No	No		4 episodes
Brass Eye	2001	Yes	No	Yes		Episode: "Paedogeddon"
TVGoHome	2001	Yes	No	Yes	Tony Rogers	
How To Watch Television	2003	Yes	No	Yes		
Spoons	2005	Yes	No	No		Also co-creator
Nathan Barley	2005	Yes	No	No		Also co-creator
Charlie Brooker's Screenwipe	2006–2008	Yes	Yes	Yes	Presenter	Also creator
Rush Hour	2007	Yes	No	No		Also creator
Dead Set	2008	Yes	Yes	Yes	Zombie	5-part miniseries
Charlie Brooker's Gameswipe	2009	Yes	No	Yes	Presenter	Special
You Have Been Watching	2009–2010	No	No	Yes	Presenter	Also creator
Newswipe with Charlie Brooker	2009–2010	Yes	No	Yes	Presenter	Also creator
Charlie Brooker's 2010 Wipe	2010	Yes	No	Yes	Presenter	Special
How TV Ruined Your Life	2010	Yes	No	Yes	Presenter	Also creator
Charlie Brooker's 2011 Wipe	2011	Yes	No	Yes	Presenter	Special
10 O'Clock Live	2011–2013	Yes	No	Yes	Presenter	
Black Mirror	2011–Present	Yes	Yes	No		Also creator
Them from That Thing	2012	Yes	No	No		2 episodes
Charlie Brooker's 2012 Wipe	2012	Yes	No	Yes	Presenter	Special
A Touch of Cloth	2012–2014	Yes	Yes	Yes	Himself	Also co-creator
How Videogames Changed the World	2013	Yes	Yes	Yes	Presenter	Special
Charlie Brooker's 2013 Wipe	2013	Yes	No	Yes	Presenter	Special
Charlie Brooker's Weekly Wipe	2013–2015	Yes	No	Yes	Presenter	Also creator
Charlie Brooker's 2014 Wipe	2014	Yes	No	Yes	Presenter	Special
Charlie Brooker's Election Wipe	2015	Yes	No	Yes	Presenter	Special
Charlie Brooker's 2015 Wipe	2015	Yes	No	Yes	Presenter	Special
Cunk on Shakespeare	2016	Yes	No	No		Special
Charlie Brooker's 2016 Wipe	2016	Yes	No	Yes	Presenter	Special
Cunk on Christmas	2016	Yes	No	No		Special
Mr Biffo's Found Footage	2017	No	Yes	No		Web series
Cunk on Britain	2017	Yes	No	No		5-part series
Black Mirror: Bandersnatch	2018	Yes	No	No		Interactive film
The Simpsons	2019	No	No	Yes	Social Rating Voice	Episode: "Thanksgiving of Horror"
Charlie Brooker's Antiviral Wipe	2020	Yes	Yes	Yes	Presenter	Special
Death to 2020	2020	Yes	No	No		Creator
Attack of the Hollywood Cliches!	2021	No	Yes	No		Special
Cat Burglar	2022	No	Yes	No		Creator
Cunk on Earth	2022	Yes	Yes	No		5-part series
Cunk on Life	2024	Yes	No	No		

== Publications ==
- TV Go Home, 2001 (rescanned reprint in 2010) (ISBN 1-84115-675-2)
- Unnovations, 2002 (rescanned reprint in 2011) (ISBN 1-84115-730-9)
- Screen Burn, 2004 (ISBN 0-571-22755-4)
- Dawn of the Dumb: Dispatches from the Idiotic Frontline, 2007 (ISBN 9780571238415)
- The Hell of it All, 2009 (ISBN 9780571229574)
- I Can Make You Hate, 2012 (ISBN 0-571-295-029)
- Article from the Guardian featuring in Voices in Speech and Writing: An Anthology, 2014 (ISBN 978-1-4479-8176-3)
