= How Videogames Changed the World =

2013 television special

- Genre: Entertainment
- Written by: Charlie Brooker; Matt Lees; Jon Blyth; Cara Ellison
- Presented by: Charlie Brooker
- Theme music composer: Jonathan Dunn
- Opening theme: Robocop theme
- Ending theme: Robocop theme
- Country of origin: United Kingdom
- Original language: English

Production
- Running time: 97 minutes
- Production company: Zeppotron

Original release
- Network: Channel 4
- Release: November 2013

How Videogames Changed the World is a one-off television special by Charlie Brooker which was aired on Channel 4 in November 2013. The show examines the 25 most significant video games according to Brooker, and through that, covers the history of the medium and its impact on wider culture.

== Pundits featured ==
- Jonathan Ross
- Jeff Minter
- Keith Stuart (journalist for The Guardian)
- Peter Serafinowicz
- Tom Watson (Labour politician)
- Peter Molyneux
- Aoife Wilson (writer for Official Xbox Magazine)
- Rob Florence
- Kate Russell (reporter)
- Graham Linehan
- Dara Ó Briain
- Gary Whitta
- David Braben
- Ellie Gibson (journalist for Eurogamer)
- Labrinth
- Felicia Day
- Keza MacDonald
- Pete Donaldson
- Berni Goode (cyber-psychologist)
- Tim Schafer
- Neil Druckmann
- Ron Gilbert
- Susan Calman (comedian)
- John Romero
- Rhianna Pratchett
- Matt Lees
- Quintin Smith (then-journalist for Eurogamer)
- Will Wright (game designer)
- Malorie Blackman
- Nolan Bushnell
- Vince Zampella

Pundits Aoife Wilson, Keza MacDonald, Quintin Smith and show writer Jon Blythe would later make several appearances on the podcast Daft Souls hosted by show writer and pundit Matt Lees.

== List of games ==
25. Pong (1972)
24. Space Invaders (1978)
23. Pac-Man (1980)
22. Manic Miner (1983)
21. Elite (1984)
20. Super Mario Bros. (1985)
19. Tetris (1986)
18. The Secret of Monkey Island (1990)
17. Street Fighter II (1991)
16. Doom (1993)
15. Night Trap (1992)
14. Tomb Raider (1996)
13. PaRappa the Rapper (1997)
12. StarCraft (1998)
11. The Sims (2000)
10. Grand Theft Auto III (2001)
9. Shadow of the Colossus (2006)
8. World of Warcraft (2005)
7. Wii Sports (2006)
6. Call of Duty 4: Modern Warfare (2007)
5. Braid (2008)
4. Angry Birds (2009)
3. Minecraft (2011)
2. The Last of Us (2013)
1. Twitter

== Reception ==
Dan Whitehead, in a review for Eurogamer, found the selection of games well chosen, enabling the show to cover the history of video games as fully as possible given its runtime. He also praised the choice of pundits, highlighting that even the most recognisable of names, such as Jonathan Ross and Peter Serafinowicz, were included because they had a clear love of games and not for their celebrity appeal. Whitehead concluded that the show was a success, fun and informative, but also hampered by the format - having to cover the entirety of video gaming history in one show to an unfamiliar audience, a symptom of the lack of video games representation on television.

Keith Stuart, who appeared on the show, reflected on its merits in a column for The Guardian. Stuart described how ending the show with Twitter was a clever way of showing how gamification has infiltrated everyday lives, with social networks relying on the same reward systems as video games. Stuart liked how the show featured games like Papers, Please, a game that explores guilt and the nature of evil, which helped to remove misconceptions that video games are incapable of exploring real-world issues. Like Whitehead, Stuart concluded with a lament over the lack of video games coverage on television, criticising broadcasters for "ceding responsibility to YouTubers and specialist online documentary makers" and for "failing their audiences". Sam Wollaston, also writing for The Guardian, gave a mixed review and was critical of the talking heads format. Wollaston commented that despite containing interesting ideas, the show was overly long. For gamers however, Wollaston wrote that the show "would have been pretty much heaven".
