= Charlie Brooker's Screenwipe =

British television series

- Genre: Television review Cultural critic Comedy
- Created by: Charlie Brooker
- Directed by: Al Campbell
- Presented by: Charlie Brooker
- Opening theme: "A.M. 180" by Grandaddy
- Country of origin: United Kingdom
- Original language: English
- No. of series: 5
- No. of episodes: 27 (list of episodes)

Production
- Running time: 30–50 minutes
- Production company: Zeppotron

Original release
- Network: BBC Four
- Release: 2 March 2006 – 16 December 2008

Related
- Newswipe with Charlie Brooker; Charlie Brooker's Gameswipe; How TV Ruined Your Life; Charlie Brooker's Weekly Wipe

Charlie Brooker's Screenwipe is a British television review comedy programme created and presented by Charlie Brooker and broadcast on BBC Four. The programme contains reviews of current shows, as well as stories and commentary on how television is produced.

== Format ==
Screenwipe is presented by Charlie Brooker, who reviews other British television programmes with a caustic and humorous tone. Brooker analyses specific programmes and genres, regularly making jokes about how programmes are created. Brooker often pays particular attention to more obscure channels on satellite, Freeview and cable, such as those dedicated to gambling, shopping, horoscopes and pornography. He explores the probable effects of television on society and the feelings programmes can create in the viewer. One segment of each show is usually dedicated to positive reviews, with analysis on why the style and content are so absorbing.

Much of the programme is filmed in Brooker's living room, with shots of him sitting in front of his TV (and laptop) with remote control in hand talking to camera, occasionally bellowing insults or sarcastic comments at whatever happens to be shown at the time, interspersed with shots of TV shows. Occasionally he will make use of props for the sake of humour, including a "seance trumpet" to mock Colin Fry's performance and an oven glove with a smiley face into which he claims to channel his unfulfilled emotions.

When not in the living room, Brooker presents segments on various pieces of television, different genres or peculiarities of production. Instead of actors, these sections often feature members of the Screenwipe production crew to illustrate points; for example, director Al Campbell as the half-witted satirist "Barry Shitpeas", and researcher Mike Bradley in a number of roles.

The series has spawned several spin-off shows which use a very similar format but examine different media: Newswipe with Charlie Brooker, Charlie Brooker's Gameswipe, and Charlie Brooker's Weekly Wipe.

== Episodes ==
Series	Episodes	Originally aired	
Series	Episodes	First aired	Last aired
1	3	2 March 2006	16 March 2006
2	5	20 July 2006	17 August 2006
3	4	5 February 2007	26 February 2007
4	5	18 September 2007	23 October 2007
5	5	18 November 2008	16 December 2008

The first full series finished with an extended edition on US television billed as Screenwipe USA. A Christmas special was broadcast on 21 December 2006 and a review of the year 2006 special was broadcast on 31 December 2006. A third series 'with a massively increased budget' (according to a spoof voiceover at the end of the final episode from the second series), was revealed to have been commissioned on 9 May 2007. The third series was preceded by a mini-Screenwipe on 12 May (shown on BBC Two's The Culture Show), which reviewed Grease is the Word and Any Dream Will Do. Shortly after the third series concluded, a Screenwipe clip show was shown on BBC Two, with repeats of the series airing on the channel in the weeks following. The third series featured a number of episodes focusing on specific themes, such as television news coverage and reality television series.

The fifth series of Screenwipe began airing on BBC Four on Tuesday 18 November 2008. The first episode dealt with (among other things) Manuelgate and television production costs (and the effect of the credit crunch on said costs). The second was focused on the changes in television advertising throughout its history, and the third was an extended edition composed entirely of Brooker's interviews with prestigious writers such as Russell T Davies and Tony Jordan. Episode four focused on "mission shows" such as The Great British Body, and featured a parody involving "pee-shyness" (paruresis), while episode five focused on children's programming through the ages. The final episode of the season was a review of 2008. In 2009, the show didn't return for another series, but a review of the year was scheduled as had been the case with previous years.

== Style ==
The humour of the show is usually based on sarcasm and cutting remarks, in a similar style to Harry Hill's TV Burp, or The Soup. Screenwipe can be characterised as being intellectually more harsh with Brooker often making surreal moral comparisons between the so-called 'real-world attitude' of certain programmes, and the logical conclusions of that attitude if it were turned towards real life. It often forms the basis for analysis of programmes - such as his review of the ITV musical drama Britannia High in which he describes the characters as "irritating show-offs" and that the school which they inhabit "in any sane world would have its windows bricked up by the government before the self-satisfied inmates could get out and infect the rest of the population."

Brooker is known to be critical of reality television shows such as Big Brother and The X Factor, and often makes scathing remarks about the sort of people who watch these shows. One example in the 2008 Christmas Special involved a remark about X Factor winner Alexandra Burke's cover of Leonard Cohen's "Hallelujah", which Brooker went on to claim is now "ruined forever as a song destined to be played at thick people's funerals".

Brooker often displays archive footage of various shows, but alters the viewer's perception through near stream-of-consciousness narration and/or ironic juxtaposition with contrasting footage or sound, e.g. highlighting what he believes is the organised crime feel of a scene from Dragons' Den by running the trumpet solo from The Godfather over the original dialogue. He has also been known to make jokes at the expense of his own show and himself, in particular making light of his resemblance to Laurence Fishburne, and in the first episode of the third series he claimed he had "a face like a paedophile walrus". Also of note was the deliberate mention of Victor Lewis-Smith, described by the 'TV Insider' being interviewed (and presumably written by Brooker) as "kind of like a rich man's you". Lewis-Smith co-wrote and presented a similar show in the late nineties called TV Offal which Brooker sarcastically and knowingly claims to have no knowledge of.

Despite his derogatory and insulting remarks aimed at many television shows, people, and near enough everything and everyone, Brooker does show his happier side and has spoken of his liking for certain US drama series including The Shield; Deadwood; The Wire; Mad Men; and the most recent version of Battlestar Galactica; as well as the current series of Doctor Who; and older documentary programmes such as Jacob Bronowski's The Ascent of Man, Civilisation, and The World at War. Brooker singles out Bronowski for praise regarding his style of presentation describing it as 'a bit like taking a warm bath in university juice'. In a more solemn example, at the end of the final episode, Brooker paid tribute to children's programmes creator Oliver Postgate, who had died the week before the programme was aired.

Brooker often makes a point of laying light praise upon unlikely targets, such as Milkshake, Five's morning programmes aimed at pre-school age children, stating, "There isn't a single piece of negativity in the whole thing and that's what you need at this time in the morning."

== Annual Wipe ==
From 2006 to 2016, the BBC broadcast an Annual Wipe. From 2017 onwards, there was no Annual Wipe due to Brooker's other commitments, with a Frankie Boyle's New World Order Review of the Year filling the vacant gap. At the end of the decade on 30 December 2019, BBC Two broadcast a 90-minute compilation show entitled "The Best of 2010-2015 Wipe with Charlie Brooker" followed by a repeat of the final 2016 Wipe. In May 2020, BBC Two broadcast "Charlie Brooker's Antiviral Wipe", a 45-minute programme in the style of the Annual Wipes, focusing on the news coverage of, and public reaction to the COVID-19 pandemic.

== Animations ==
The show is also notable for using animations produced by internet animator David Firth. To date the show has used eight of Firth's original creations. The 2006 Christmas Special featured a special appearance from Firth's deranged alter-ego, Jerry Jackson, whose cartoon appeared substituting for an animation that Firth had created beforehand. This original animation was rejected by the BBC on the grounds that it was far too offensive to be broadcast on TV. Firth recently announced on his website that the BBC had asked him to produce an animation for each episode of the second series of Screenwipe. Three were shown but the fourth, a Jerry Jackson cartoon, was once again rejected by the BBC. Firth stated in a post on Fat-Pie.com that "Jerry's [cartoon] was about Political Correctness on TV and contained a certain degree of sarcasm, yet sarcasm the TV company didn't see the funny side of, and they refused to use it". The third series saw Firth produce four more short animations (of which three were aired) entitled 'The World Within A Sock', in which a group known as The Establishment buys the year 2008.

== See also ==
- Newswipe with Charlie Brooker
- Charlie Brooker's Gameswipe
- You Have Been Watching
- How TV Ruined Your Life
- Charlie Brooker's Weekly Wipe
