= Newswipe with Charlie Brooker =

British news review comedy programme

- Genre: Television review
- Created by: Charlie Brooker
- Presented by: Charlie Brooker
- Opening theme: "You Are Here" (FortDax Remix) by Nathan Fake
- Country of origin: United Kingdom
- Original language: English
- No. of series: 2
- No. of episodes: 12

Production
- Running time: 30 minutes
- Production company: Zeppotron

Original release
- Network: BBC Four
- Release: 25 March 2009 – 23 February 2010

Related
- Charlie Brooker's Screenwipe; Charlie Brooker's Gameswipe; How TV Ruined Your Life; Charlie Brooker's Weekly Wipe

Newswipe with Charlie Brooker is a British news review comedy programme broadcast on BBC Four during 2009 and 2010 which was written and presented by Charlie Brooker. It is similar to Brooker's Screenwipe series which is also shown on BBC Four. A first series of six episodes ran between 25 March 2009 and 29 April 2009. A second series began on 19 January 2010 and concluded on 23 February 2010.

== Format ==
The aim of Newswipe was to expose the inner workings of news media, just as Screenwipe does to television in general.

The series was a comic, thoughtful and acerbic analysis of recent news coverage. Newswipe also looked at the way the news is presented to the public. Experts were on hand to pick apart certain stories and analysed the news media's obsessions.

Charlie Brooker commented: "This is new territory for me: I'm no current affairs expert. Just like, I suspect, many people, when I tune into the news I often feel like I've wandered into episode 389 of the world's most complex soap opera. So it's also about me trying to make sense of a bewildering and often bloody stupid world."

Like Screenwipe, much of the programme was filmed in Brooker's living room, with shots of him sitting in front of his TV (and laptop) with remote in hand talking to camera, occasionally bellowing insults or sarcastic comments at whatever happens to be shown at the time, interspersed with shots of shows.

== Reaction ==
The Times, reviewing the first episode, called it "glorious, perceptive and rude" and exposing "the inanity of 24-hour news".

A clip entitled "How To Report The News" from episode two of the second series amassed over two and a half million views on YouTube after it was syndicated by The Huffington Post soon after its first airing. It is currently the ninth 'top rated' video of all-time on the site.

Newswipe won the Entertainment category award at the Royal Television Awards in 2010, beating both Britain's Got Talent and The X Factor, and was also nominated for a BAFTA in the same year for Best Entertainment Programme, however on this occasion losing to Britain's Got Talent.

== Episodes ==
=== Series 1 ===
Episode	Air date	Description	UK viewers (millions)
1	25 March 2009	Brooker discusses television news's coverage of the 2008 financial crisis, particularly focussing on the gimmicks used to present "the crunch" to audiences, "The Week in Bullshit", which looked at Pope Benedict XVI's comments on birth control, the overblown coverage of Muslim protestors in Luton, and later the damagingly sensationalist reporting of the Winnenden school shooting. There are also authored segments about the PR industry's present influence over journalism with a case study on the NatWest Three by Nick Davies, a poem on bankers by Tim Key and Danielle Ward attempts to rebrand the economic downturn as "moneygeddon".	N/A
2	1 April 2009	Brooker looks into the gradual change of the news's treatment and usage of public emotion and popular opinion, beginning with the period following the death of Diana, Princess of Wales and leading to the death of Jade Goody. This episode examines how during certain events (particularly the heavy snowfall experienced in the UK during early 2009) the news catered more to trivialities as opposed to genuine current events. Also examined is how a change occurred in British politics in the previous half a century, and how politicians are now largely concerned with using their influence to strengthen their careers and their earnings, rather than representing their constituents. This was covered in a segment by political journalist Peter Oborne which frequently had to be censored for legal reasons.	0.31
3	8 April 2009	In this episode, Brooker examines the evolving role of anchors and newscasters in the media, from their positions as simple "news-readers" in the early days of television to their current position of more serious and driven journalists. Also examined is the role of anchors as both ideologues (such as Bill O'Reilly, Glenn Beck and Sean Hannity on Fox News, and Keith Olbermann on MSNBC) and approachable, familiar figures on early morning television. A tongue-in-cheek piece was also produced by filmmaker Adam Curtis, which charted how the news became an excellent tool for the radical left of the 1960s to motivate politicians to action, before becoming what Curtis now describes as a simple tool of "oh-dearism" which drives audiences to apathy and helplessness.	0.25
4	15 April 2009	Brooker covers news presentations of the G20 conference and its focus on resolving the economic downturn, paying particular attention to coverage of Barack Obama. Later in the episode, Brooker examines the wave of protests that surrounded the G20, and how in the ensuing media coverage, the message of the protestors was lost (as pointed out by Labour politician Tony Benn) and instead became secondary to the violence and public damage which took place. Brooker also seriously notes how despite the apparently exhaustive coverage, the death of Ian Tomlinson was missed entirely by the larger news broadcasters, and required the work of an investigative journalist to be brought to light. Also included is a piece by Ben Goldacre which discusses the media's portrayal of the supposed link (later discredited) between autism and the MMR vaccine.	0.32
5	22 April 2009	Because Brooker had suffered an apparent injury and the production team had been over-stretched, this episode became a compilation episode (this was originally intended for the final programme).	N/A
6	29 April 2009	Brooker begins with a history of graphical aids in news broadcasts and their current status as garish, CGI animations rather than displays of useful information - particularly during events such as elections. In the "This Week in Bullshit" segment, Brooker covers the reaction to comments made by Iranian president Mahmoud Ahmadinejad during the Durban Review Conference, as well as a lengthy section on the 2009 United Kingdom Budget. In other pieces which look into the dwindling influence of traditional newspapers, Peter Oborne discusses the relationship between the media and government in the UK, while Nick Davies (author of Flat Earth News) illustrates the increased use of the "dark arts" of computer hacking, phone tapping and bribery by Fleet Street journalists to get a story.	0.25

=== Series 2 ===
Episode	Air date	Description	UK viewers (millions)
1	19 January 2010	Brooker discusses how the news media always needs to develop a narrative of fear in any topic, from the Nuclear threat, Salmonella in eggs, to Acid house music and the Millennium Bug, by emphasising worst-case scenarios frequently in the face of more reasonable, scientific evidence. Canadian journalist Dan Gardner and US stand-up comedian Doug Stanhope contributed pieces on a similar theme, from the perspective of their respective countries. The central segment focused on the Christmas pants bomb attempt, as did a poem from Tim Key. The final segment examined the media's overblown reaction to Britain's unexpected "Big Freeze".	0.37
2	26 January 2010	Brooker discusses how Islam4UK orchestrated their publicity stunt of a march through Wootton Bassett and how filler reports are structured and padded out. How news airtime is filled with hand bags, social disruption (the truth about ASBOs), health reports, animals and analysing the brains response to various scenes from Britain. With guest stars such as Tim Key and Heather Brooke who discussed how Britain's journalism is based on anonymous sources. Doug Stanhope examines how America's newscasts portray the news in a different light as the day progresses.	0.33
3	2 February 2010	Brooker reviews the media's coverage of the 2010 Haiti earthquake, concluding that while most coverage has been exemplary, the need to tell a story has occasionally distanced journalists from the reality of the situation. Marina Hyde discusses the increasing importance placed on celebrities in the news and how attaching celebrities to causes can sometimes overshadow, rather than highlight, important issues. Brooker continues this thread by discussing the conflict of interest of the news both reporting on and promoting celebrities, particularly focussing on the triviality of Five's Live from Studio Five. The "Week in Bullshit" segments look at the media's attempts to fathom the Home Office's UK Threat Levels indicator and the hype regarding the iPad.	0.32
4	9 February 2010	Brooker examines Tony Blair's role in the Iraq Inquiry and how the relationship between politicians and the media has gradually become less deferential over the decades. Adam Curtis explores how journalists' discovery of corruption amongst elites everywhere beginning with Watergate, as well as the rise of a class of experts, fosters a pervasive, almost Nixonian sense of paranoia amongst the public at large towards politicians, elites, and even their own bodies. Doug Stanhope argues that the media willfully ignores the role of overpopulation in the environmental crisis. Kay Burley's interview with Peter Andre on Sky News is presented as an example of both the media's insensitivity and its frivolity.	0.33
5	16 February 2010	Brooker explores the often tedious nature of live coverage. Doug Stanhope wonders why the media aggressively solicits the frequently idiotic opinions of the public. "The Week in Bullshit" looks at coverage of the newfound popularity of leeches, ITV's acceptance of responsibility in the I'm a Celebrity rat-eating incident, and an ITN report about the decline of the practice of eating dogs in China. Tim Key presents a poem about disgraced MPs. Other segments examine the media's hysterical coverage of the John Terry affair scandal, the response to the news that four MPs will face criminal charges in the MPs' Expenses scandal, and a BBC News series following journalist Nick Robinson's efforts to solicit voters' opinions.	0.33
6	23 February 2010	Compilation of segments from this and the previous series.	N/A

== See also ==
- Charlie Brooker's Screenwipe
- Charlie Brooker's Gameswipe
- You Have Been Watching
- The Daily Show
