= Charlie Brooker's Weekly Wipe =

British television programme (2013–2018)

- Genre: Review; Cultural critic
- Created by: Charlie Brooker
- Presented by: Charlie Brooker
- Theme music composer: Nathan Fake
- Opening theme: "You Are Here" (FortDax Remix) by Nathan Fake
- Country of origin: United Kingdom
- Original language: English
- No. of series: 3
- No. of episodes: 23

Production
- Running time: 30 minutes
- Production companies: Zeppotron; House of Tomorrow

Original release
- Network: BBC Two
- Release: 31 January 2013 – 29 December 2016

Related
- Charlie Brooker's Screenwipe; Newswipe with Charlie Brooker; Charlie Brooker's Gameswipe; How TV Ruined Your Life; Cunk on Britain

Charlie Brooker's Weekly Wipe is a British television review programme created and presented by Charlie Brooker. The programme was an amalgam of the earlier Wipe series, with reviews of current television programmes, news events, games, and films.

The programme was commissioned by the BBC in November 2012, with six episodes ordered. It began airing on 31 January 2013, and was broadcast on BBC Two. Two more series followed in 2014 and 2015. A special edition of the show entitled Election Wipe was broadcast on 6 May 2015, the day before the UK general election.

In May 2020 a new one-off episode entitled Antiviral Wipe was broadcast, which was filmed in lockdown due to the COVID-19 pandemic.

== Format ==
Weekly Wipe follows a format similar to Brooker's earlier works. It features Brooker commenting on a range of recent programmes, events, games, and films. Brooker presents the programme from both his living-room and a presenters' desk, similar to Newswipe. Brooker also narrates news footage, and other VTs, commenting humorously on their content. Whilst covering the most prominent events of the week, Weekly Wipe also satirises more commonplace or minor occurrences.

Weekly Wipe features Al Campbell as "Barry Shitpeas" and Diane Morgan as "Philomena Cunk" (Cunk being portrayed as a deliberately dim-witted/ill-informed interviewer), and segments by comedians Doug Stanhope, Tim Key, Limmy, Jake Yapp, Catriona Knox as reporter "Emily Surname" and Morgana Robinson. In the first series, alongside these contributors, guest stars such as Richard Osman and Susan Calman joined Brooker in a chat show segment, discussing recent events of interest.

The programme includes segments used by Brooker in his year-in-review wipes, such as the "World of Bullshit" section; these short clips cover the more mundane elements of otherwise newsworthy events. Brooker also regularly links news stories together to make them more humorous, and satirises popular opinions to make light of otherwise serious events. In a similar section, "World of Shitverts", Brooker satirises popular adverts. As with much of Brooker's work, Weekly Wipe openly mocks other shows, people, and news events.

Weekly Wipe comments on media, public reaction, and how the two influence each other.

== Reception ==
Weekly Wipe has received generally positive reviews from critics, who praise Brooker's return to the original Wipe format. The studio-based chat show element of the first episode was criticised, with its jarring change of pace separating it from the rest of the monologic episode.

Weekly Wipe received a nomination in the Comedy and Comedy Entertainment Programme category at the 2015 British Academy Television Awards.

== Episodes ==
Episode ratings from BARB.

=== Series 1 ===
| No. overall | Episode No. | Airdate | Viewers (millions) | BBC Two weekly ranking |
|---|---|---|---|---|
| 1 | 1 | 31 January 2013 | —N/a | —N/a |
| 2 | 2 | 7 February 2013 | —N/a | —N/a |
| 3 | 3 | 14 February 2013 | 1.57 | —N/a |
| 4 | 4 | 21 February 2013 | —N/a | —N/a |
| 5 | 5 | 28 February 2013 | —N/a | —N/a |
| 6 | 6 | 7 March 2013 | —N/a | —N/a |

=== Series 2 ===
| No. overall | Episode No. | Airdate | Viewers (millions) | BBC Two weekly ranking |
|---|---|---|---|---|
| 7 | 1 | 9 January 2014 | 1.64 | 26 |
| 8 | 2 | 16 January 2014 | 1.66 | 20 |
| 9 | 3 | 23 January 2014 | —N/a | —N/a |
| 10 | 4 | 30 January 2014 | —N/a | —N/a |
| 11 | 5 | 6 February 2014 | 1.75 | 25 |
| 12 | 6 | 13 February 2014 | —N/a | —N/a |

=== Series 3 ===
| No. overall | Episode No. | Airdate | Viewers (millions) | BBC Two weekly ranking |
|---|---|---|---|---|
| 13 | 1 | 29 January 2015 | 1.46 | 21 |
| 14 | 2 | 5 February 2015 | 1.35 | 21 |
| 15 | 3 | 12 February 2015 | 1.78 | 11 |
| 16 | 4 | 19 February 2015 | 1.50 | 17 |
| 17 | 5 | 26 February 2015 | 1.61 | 13 |
| 18 | 6 | 12 March 2015 | 1.34 | 15 |

=== Specials ===
| Episode | Airdate | Viewers (millions) | BBC Two weekly ranking |
|---|---|---|---|
| 2013 Wipe | 28 December 2013 | —N/a | —N/a |
| 2014 Wipe | 30 December 2014 | 2.21 | 9 |
| Election Wipe | 6 May 2015 | 2.27 | 6 |
| 2015 Wipe | 30 December 2015 | 2.03 | 11 |
| 2016 Wipe | 29 December 2016 | 3.04 | 3 |
| Antiviral Wipe | 14 May 2020 | 2.92 | 3 |
