= Games World =

- Genre: Entertainment
- Created by: Jane Hewland
- Presented by: Bob Mills (1993–95); Andy Collins (1998)
- Country of origin: United Kingdom
- Original language: English
- No. of series: 4
- No. of episodes: 540

Production
- Running time: 30 minutes (inc. adverts)
- Production company: Hewland International

Original release
- Network: Sky One
- Release: 1 March 1993 – 2 October 1998

Related
- GamesMaster

Games World is a British entertainment programme that aired on Sky One originally from 1 March 1993 to 10 March 1995 with Bob Mills as host, and then revived from 9 March to 2 October 1998 with Andy Collins as host.

== Format ==
The main body of the show took place on Mondays and Wednesdays, and was an elimination contest between several youngsters over several different video games, where winners would go on to Friday's edition. Every Friday, a single winner from the previous day staked points on various matches at differing games, and would go up against various cartoonish characters known as "Videators". Winners received a Games World bomber jacket, whilst the overall series winner would receive an arcade machine.

Bob Mills was the presenter for the show's original run, along with "GamesAnimal" Dave Perry, Jeremy Daldry and Tim Boone.

The original show also had different formats during the week, called The Peep Parlour, which was a computer-designed peep-parlour where videogamers would ask for advice from "The Games Mistress" related to their video game playing queries, and featured Diane Youdale, better known as Jet from Gladiators, and a selection of other characters. This feature also had "master classes" presented by the various Videators in which they would guide viewers through particular parts of a selected video game. The show became the highest rated British produced TV show on Sky One - beaten only by The Simpsons and WWF Wrestling. The Peep Parlour in its earlier run, would feature a computer generated talking head called Madame Pixel as well as various characters portrayed by David Walliams.

The Peep Parlour was dropped for the second series and replaced by Barry's Joypad starring the Videator Big Boy Barry. It featured video game reviews, cheats, features, as well as being a comedy show for the Big Boy Barry character. This segment of the show also featured Walliams playing the part of Lesley Luncheonmeat, Barry's sidekick.

There was also an interactive phone-in show where callers would play video games live on the air, against other members of the public, with a celebrity guest at the controls while the viewer gave directions. The games were specially designed for the series, but from the midpoint of series two technological advances were brought in that allowed players to press the buttons on a touch tone phone to control the games, and were from this point games that could be found on the high street.

The theme was then slightly changed so there were two teams involved in this format of the show, with players on telephones and players on telephones in their home shown live on TV cameras. The contestants playing on the phone but not seen on the show would normally win. The contestants shown live on the show would be picked at random on the street and a filming recorded earlier in the day of the production crew selecting them down would be shown.

By the third series this format had the added twist of forfeits if the challenger in the home would lose a game. One forfeit involved a boy having to rip a poster of Pamela Anderson off his bedroom wall, after losing on Super Street Fighter II. Barry's Joypad was renamed Barry TV or BTV for the third series.

An unaired episode from 1994 was leaked onto YouTube. Sky refused to air the show as it contained a feature on GamesWorld magazine, which was published by a rival company (Paragon Publishing) to Sky's News group.

A fourth series was scheduled to air in 1995/1996 but never materialized. Hewland decided to cease any plans for series four until 1998, when the show ultimately returned under Hewland's new title of New Games World. Bob Mills was replaced by Andy Collins and the set became an Aztec-themed jungle environment. Dave Perry remained as the last of the original on-screen team though he left towards the end of the series, reportedly disillusioned with the new format and setting.

Relatedly, the games strand on the now defunct "The Computer Channel"- another Hewland production- was called "Games World" until the channel became ".tv", which would generally take the format of a review show, hosted by Big Boy Barry.

Pointless star Richard Osman was a researcher on the show

== The Videators ==
The Videators were the most prominent characters of the series.

Series 1 saw the emergence of Big Boy Barry, who became the series' most popular character. Other characters over the first year included Master Moriarty - a stuck-up schoolboy, The Games Messiah, Letty Edwards, Radion Automatic, the Ninja and The Executioner; the latter four were all dropped for Series Two. Barry won the majority of his games (primarily Sonic 2) as did Moriarty.

Series 2 saw the return of Barry, along with Master Moriarty and the Games Messiah (now played by a different actor). The most notable new Videators were Mr Mathers, who after a shaky start found his feet and went on a winning streak, and Persian Prince of Perfection, who was inundated with fan mail. Videators such as Combat Cal, the Violet Blade and others tended to lose most of their games and all but one were dropped by the next series.

Series 3 saw the return of Barry, Moriarty, the now-established Mathers and the Violet Blade. New Videators were Trixie Belle, Colin the Console Cowboy, Ragga D, and Electric Eddie. A recurring theme in this series saw Colin the Console Cowboy and the Violet Blade feuding with each other.

Series 4 saw pretty much an entirely new cast of videators, with only Martin Mathers returning as a new character, Lord Leslie Mathers.

It was rumoured to have Barry, Mathers and Eddie returning as the domineering characters of the show (Mathers and Eddie more so as players, Barry as the figurehead). Another aborted plan for series four involved a Videator named Big Boy Benny, to be promoted as either a "dark side" alter-ego to Barry or a hapless comic foil, parodying a popular angle from the wrestling world.

== Cast ==
=== Presenters ===
- Bob Mills (as himself, presenter (Series 1–3))
- Andy Collins (as himself, presenter (Series 4))
- Dave Perry (as himself, presenter (Series 1–4))

=== Co-commentators ===
- Tim Boone (as himself, co-commentator (Series 1–3))
- Jeremy Daldry (as himself, co-commentator (Series 1–3))
- Alex Verrey (as Big Boy Barry, co-commentator (Series 4))
- Kirk Ewing (as himself, co-commentator (Series 4))

=== Videators ===
- Big Boy Barry (played by Alex Verrey) (series 1–3, series 4 grand final)
- Electric Eddie (played by Rob J Nathan) (series 3)
- Colin the Console Cowboy (played by Michael Donovan) (series 3)
- The Executioner (played by Gary Harrod) (series 1–2)
- Radion Automatic (played by Edward Laurence) (series 1)
- Letty Edwards "The Gaming Granny" (series 1)
- Combat Cal (played by Cal Jones) (series 2)
- Mr. Mathers "The Megabyte Millionaire" (played by Martin Mathers) (series 2–3)
- The Violet Blade (played by Rik Henderson, also the series producer/writer)(series 1–3)
- The Persian Prince of Perfection (played by Hussain Ghafoor) (series 1–2)
- Ragga D "The Games M.C." (played by Cecil Dyer) (series 2)
- Master Moriarty (played by Tristan Moriarty) (series 1–2)
- Trixie Belle "The Minx from Hell" (played by Pushpa Chopra) (series 2–3)
- The Game Messiah (played by Doug Johns) (series 1)
- Maria "The Fox" Sanchez (played by Catherine Channon) (series 4)
- Eddie "Pretty Boy" Essex (played by Jason Kilshaw, who went on to work on Gamer.tv and Playr) (series 4)
- Lord Leslie Mathers (played by Martin Mathers) (series 4)
- Manfred Peril (played by Robin Delbourgo) (series 4)
- Metro (series 4)
- Mystic Mo (series 4)

=== Barry's Joypad ===
- Big Boy Barry (played by Alex Verrey)
- Lesley (played by David Walliams)
- Charlene (played by Sarah Phillys)
- The Games Mistress (played by Diane Youdale)
- Voice Over (Dan (The Soundman) McGrath)
