= Film 24 (channel) =

Film24

Programming
- Picture format: 576i (4:3, SDTV)

Ownership
- Owner: Film24 Limited (2007–2010); Sony Pictures Television (2010–2011)

History
- Launched: 2007
- Closed: 4 April 2011
- Replaced by: Sony Entertainment Television

Film24 was a British television channel, that was available on Sky channel 157. The company had offices at Pinewood Studios and produced content for the TV channel as well as programmes for international TV, the Internet and mobile distribution. Before its sale in 2010, the channel averaged around a million viewers a week.

== History ==
Film24 was an independent multi-platform content business, based at Pinewood Film Studios, that produced programmes and short features about the film industry and films themselves to satisfy the ever-growing consumer demand for film consumption and the audience's fascination with the movie business. Content was available primarily on Sky. The Channel was founded by one of the UK’s top headhunters - Nicky J Davis.

Film24, the TV channel, launched in July 2007 as a channel about film, not airing films (unless they would airing films otherwise), but with original programming covering large and small films and DVD releases, new talent, regional cinema, films in production and behind-the-scenes programmes reporting and explaining every aspect of the film industry.

In the latter half of 2009, the COO, Andrew Burns, brought in a new programming strategy, focusing on acquiring programmes. This new direction saw an increase in celebrity programming, demonstrating the Hollywood lifestyle and reality television shows.

Film24 also showed comedy, factual documentaries, sports, as well as awards shows, with the Screen Actors Guild Awards and the Independent Spirit Awards airing in 2010. The Screen Actors Guild Awards were transmitted live in the UK. Viewing figures increased to a million a week

In September 2009, Film24 commissioned Starstruck Media to relaunch flagship programme Film Xtra. Originally, thirteen 15 minute programmes were agreed, but the programme was soon made into a half-hour feature, and continued to look at new cinema releases, home entertainment releases, and news from the world of film. The programme was presented by former CBBC and Top of the Pops presenter, Adrian Dickson. A spin-off series, that was broadcast post the 9 p.m. watershed - FXU, started in January 2010, presented by Tim Fornara.

Also in September, Film24 acquired the rights to computer games shows Playr and Playr Guides.

In December 2009, Film24 announced plans to significantly increase its spend on new programmes.

In early 2010, the channel showed a number of Southern Television programmes such as Freewheelers, The Flockton Flyer and the TV version of Dick Barton, some of which later turned up on Talking Pictures TV who own the rights to the Southern TV library as well as a significant number of films that were also shown on the channel. It also completed a number of output deals with a number of major Film studios and distributors

=== Film24 Sale ===
The channel's principal shareholder was Lord Paul's Caparo Group. In May 2010, Angad Paul (CEO of Caparo Group) withdrew promised development funding, without any notice, following serious financial problems at Caparo, forcing the channel into the aforementioned financial problems.

On 22 June 2010, Canis Media, who were contracted to schedule the channel announced that it had been asked to review options for the potential sale of the Film24 EPG by Film24’s board

On 7 September 2010, Canis Media announced that the sale of the Film24 EPG was "near to completion" and the new owner would be unveiled shortly. On 28 October 2010, it was reported that Sony Pictures Television were on the brink of a deal to buy Film24 as their first entry into the UK channel market. On 19 November 2010, Sony Pictures Television acquired the EPG slot for Film24 for an undisclosed sum.

On 8 November 2015, Angad Paul (CEO of Caparo Group) committed suicide by jumping from his 8th floor London penthouse two weeks after his family's steel company Caparo Group was forced into Administration.
