= Freestream (disambiguation) =

Freestream is a term in aerodynamics.

Freestream may also refer to:

- Freestream (cars), a company bought by Caparo, now trading as Caparo Vehicle Technologies
- Free streaming, the non-scattering motion of a particle in astronomy
- Sling Freestream, the free portion of Sling TV
