= DVD Monthly =

DVD Monthly was a UK-based national magazine covering DVD and home entertainment news and reviews. It was founded by Dave Perry in 1999, in Exeter, Devon, as part of his Predator Publishing company. From August 2006 onward, it was owned by Jazz Publishing, which was based in Chester, while the magazine itself continued to be produced in Devon.

== History ==
DVD Monthly was founded in April 1999 as the first magazine of Dave Perry's Predator Publishing in Exeter, Devon, UK. Shortly after its launch, funding for the continued running of the magazine came from Goodfellas Publishing, who later became the majority shareholders of Predator Publishing. Initially edited by Dave Perry himself, Jon Bruford subsequently took over as editor in early 2003 and from September 2004 until 2009, the title was edited by Tim Isaac. After Goodfellas decided to close most of its publishing ventures, the magazine was bought by Chester-based Jazz Publishing in August 2006, which took all advertising and sales in-house to their offices, while leaving editorial and design in Exeter. Its major competition in the UK was DVD Review magazine and HD Review magazine.

The magazine closed down in 2009.

== Regular Features ==
Published every four weeks, the magazine presented news, reviews and features based on upcoming and classic DVDs. It also included star interviews, competitions, hardware reviews and comment. The magazine's tone was generally conversational, presenting a mix of mainstream and specialist film and DVD content.

== HD Monthly ==
Starting in May 2008, DVD Monthly began publishing a 32-page supplement called 'HD Monthly' with each issue, which covered high definition and Blu-ray in the UK and around the world. Similar in style to its parent title, it was included as part of the magazine each month.
