= GamesMaster (magazine) =

Multi-format computer and video game magazine

- Editor: Ian Evenden
- Categories: Video game journalism
- Frequency: Monthly
- First issue: January 1993
- Final issue: December 2018
- Company: Future plc Summit Media (2003–2006)
- Country: United Kingdom; Philippines (2003–2006)
- Based in: Bath
- Language: English
- Website: gamesradar.com
- ISSN: 0967-9855

GamesMaster was a monthly multi-format computer and video game magazine published by Future plc in the United Kingdom. As of 2012, it was the biggest selling multi-format video games magazine in the United Kingdom, outselling its partner publication Edge. Along with partner magazine GamesTM, it ceased print in November 2018. It was originally launched to complement the television show GamesMaster.

== History ==
The magazine was launched in January 1993, to complement the television show of the same name. While the show later ceased broadcasting, the magazine continued, outlasting the show by 20 years. GamesMaster was edited for Future by Jim Douglas, who was poached from Emap, where he had been due to edit the official Nintendo magazine.

The first issue of the magazine sold 219,492 copies according to Future Publishing.
