= Sega Pro =

Video game magazine

- Issue 38, November 1994
- Editor: Dominic Handy
- Categories: Video game magazines
- Frequency: Monthly
- First issue: November 1991
- Final issue: 1996
- Company: Paragon Publishing
- Country: United Kingdom
- Language: English
- ISSN: 0964-2641

Sega Pro was the first publication from Paragon Publishing and catered for the Sega consoles: the Master System, Game Gear and the Mega Drive. Early editorial staff included Dominic Handy (editor), Les Ellis (games editor), Dave Perry (designer), James Scullion and Damian Butt as staff writers. The magazine existed between 1991 and 1996. A German edition of Sega Pro was also published (1992–1994).

== Sega Pro CD ==
During the end of 1994, Paragon Publishing launched a CD version of the magazine, to be released alongside the normal version, simply title Sega Pro CD. Published separately from Sega Pro, starting in October 1994 with issue 1 through to issue 3. From January 1995 Paragon started releasing both magazine editions with the same issue number sequence carried on from the original Sega Pro (issue 40). Versions with and without the cover CD were available, with a price difference, and those who bought the wrong one could send away their request to get the demo sent to them.

== Decline ==
Due to saturation of the console magazine market, among other issues, readership declined from 64,003 in 1993 to just over 30,000 in 1994. By the end of 1995, the magazine content had shifted, inevitably, towards Sega's Saturn games and Master System, Mega Drive and Game Gear content all quietly disappeared.
