= Paragon Publishing =

Magazine publisher in the United Kingdom

Paragon Publishing Ltd
- Type: Ltd
- Industry: Magazine publishing
- Founded: 1990; 36 years ago
- Founder: Richard Monteiro and Dianne Taverner
- Defunct: 2003
- Headquarters: Trowbridge, Wiltshire, England, UK

Paragon Publishing Ltd (or Paragon for short) was a magazine publisher in the UK, which published computer games and other entertainment titles from 1991 to 2003.

== History ==
Paragon Publishing Ltd was formed in a small office in Trowbridge, Wiltshire by ex-Future Publishing staff Richard Monteiro and Diane Tavener. With a small team of staff they began work on their first publication Sega Pro.

With the success of Sega Pro the company began expanding and launched several other titles, hiring more staff to produce these new titles. It was not long before the company moved into new premises in Bournemouth.

The company continued to publish magazines for the video games market as well as other areas for the next decade.

In 1999, Paragon acquired the gaming publications Playstation Pro, N64 Pro, Planet Playstation, PC Home and PC Basics from IDG Media. The company already published 64 Magazine and Dreamcast Solutions at the time.

In July 2003 Paragon Publishing and its 30-odd magazine titles were sold to Highbury House Communications for £32m. Imagine Publishing, which was formed by ex-Paragon staff Damian Butt, Steve Boyd and Mark Kendrick, would buy back most of these titles when Highbury themselves went into liquidation in early 2006.

Later, in 2016 Imagine Publishing itself was acquired by Future Publishing.

== Key titles ==
Paragon published many titles during its decade run, mainly computer or video games based, but later moved into other areas of entertainment.

=== Sega Pro ===
The company's first magazine publication and a big success. Covering the early 90s explosion in popularity of Sega's Mega Drive as well as the Master System and Game Gear. Well-known names on early issues included Dominic Handy, Les Ellis, Dave Perry, James Scullion and Damian Butt. Ran for many years up until Sega themselves disappeared.

=== Mega Power ===
Following the success of Sega Pro, a new title focusing on the Mega Drive and in particular the Mega-CD was launched in 1993. The magazine was the first console publication to include a covermounted CD.

=== Console XS ===
A bi-monthly games console tips magazine launched in 1993. Featuring game cheats, tips, and guides for the consoles of the early 90s. After four issues, the title was split into two: Sega XS, which focused solely on Sega platforms, and Super XS, covering Nintendo games.

=== Games World: The Magazine ===
Games World was a video games based TV show broadcast on satellite in the early 90s. The show's producers, Hewland International, gave the rights to produce Games World: The Magazine to Paragon. The multi-format magazine content was generally centred on Sega and Nintendo's consoles.

=== Nintendo Pro ===
As with Sega Pro, Nintendo Pro focused on the Nintendo range of consoles. It was originally known as N64 Pro and was one of the titles Paragon Publishing acquired with the acquisition of the Macclesfield-based titles of IDG Media.

=== Play ===
Launched in 1995 by Paragon with Dave Perry as editor. One of the first PlayStation magazines released covering Sony's PlayStation products, later including the PlayStation 2, PlayStation Portable and the PlayStation 3. It is the UK's longest-running PlayStation magazine, and final issue released in 2016 under Future Publishing.

=== PowerStation ===
Originally a PlayStation magazine and now a PlayStation and Xbox 360 tips magazine launched at the same time as sister title Play by Dave Perry. As with Console XS content included games cheats, tips and guides. Along with its sister title, PowerStation was bought by Imagine Publishing in 2006.

=== Saturn+ ===
A short-lived Sega Saturn magazine that ran for six issues, from Christmas 1995 to February 1997.

=== X Gen ===
A short-lived multi format magazine in the style of ACE and EDGE.

=== 64 Magazine ===
Launched in 1997, 64 Magazine covered Nintendo's N64 console.

=== Dreamcast Magazine ===
Covering Sega's Dreamcast, Dreamcast Magazine was launched in 1999.

=== DVD Review ===
Launched in 1999 and later purchased by Future Publishing.

=== CUBE ===
Launched in 2001 to cover Nintendo's GameCube console.

=== Windows Made Easy ===
A beginner's guide to Windows, including step-by-step guides and tutorials about using the platform.

=== Web Pages Made Easy ===
A beginner's guide to creating web pages, including step-by-step guides and tutorials..

=== Digital Photography Made Easy ===
A beginner's guide to digital photography, launched in 2000, covering camera skills and photo editing.

=== PC Essentials ===
A quarterly title, launched in 2000, devoted to software that can be downloaded from the internet.

=== PC Home ===
Launched in November 1992, PC Home provided articles and tutorials for creatives and gamers on a PC.

=== PC Basics ===
A magazine dedicated to computing, software and hardware, including step-by-step guides, reviews and features.
