= 10 Play =

10 Play may refer to:

- 10 (VoD service), the video on demand and catch up TV service for Australia's Network 10
- Gamer.tv, a weekly British television show produced by the company of the same name
