= Dave Green (journalist) =

British journalist

Dave Green is a journalist, broadcaster and snack food expert. He was Production Editor on Amiga Power magazine (who claimed he was an alien) and Reviews Editor for the brief early version of Wired UK. Together with Danny O'Brien, he was jointly responsible for publishing the email newsletter Need To Know and with whom he also co-wrote and -presented the television show 404 Not Found. He also published Snackspot, which called itself the "world's premier snack food discussion site", and was technology correspondent for the Phill Jupitus breakfast programme on BBC 6Music. He worked with Ben Moor on BBC2's Big Science series, and with Kevin Cecil and Andy Riley on The 99p Challenge.

He was primary organiser of the UK grassroots technology conferences Extreme Computing, NotCon04, and Open Tech 2005.

Dave graduated from University College, Oxford in 1990, and was a postgraduate in Artificial Intelligence at the University of Edinburgh, where he co-wrote the Internet meme "20 Things That Never Happen in Star Trek" with Graeme MacDonald.

He lives in London, England.
