= Top Gear Live (show) =

Supercar motor show

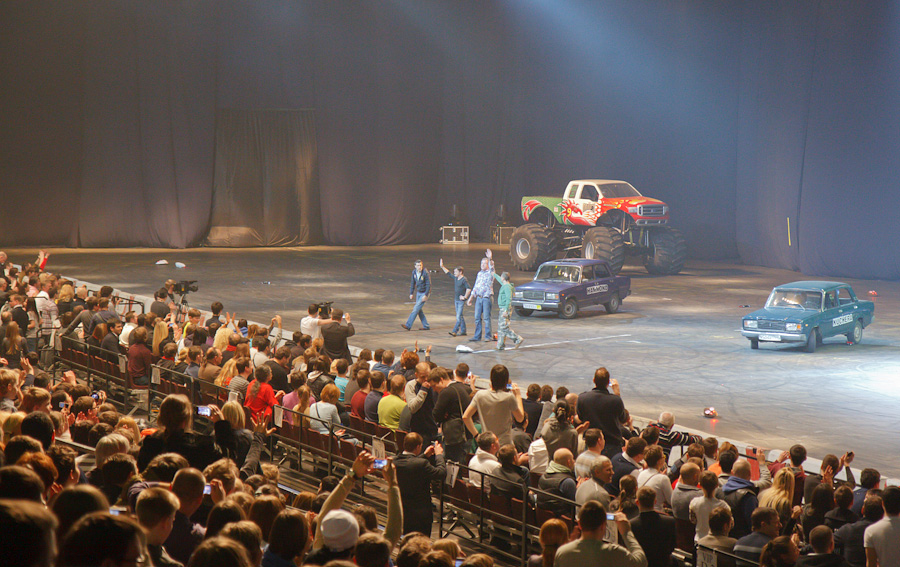
A Top Gear Live show in 2012

Top Gear Live (previously known as the MPH Show) was a supercar motor show. Created as a crossover between the recently relaunched Top Gear and Fifth Gear, it was initially hosted by presenters of both programmes. It was held annually at Earls Court beginning in 2003, later expanding to be also held at the Birmingham NEC from 2005 with the two shows being around one week apart. The show took up either one or two halls at both venues, and there were usually two parts to it: the Exhibition and the Main Show. From 2011 the show was rebranded and relaunched as "Top Gear Live", tying together its close links to the Top Gear television series and with a venue change to ExCeL London. Top Gear Live was later expanded, being used by BBC Worldwide as a brand of touring stadium show.

== Exhibition Section ==
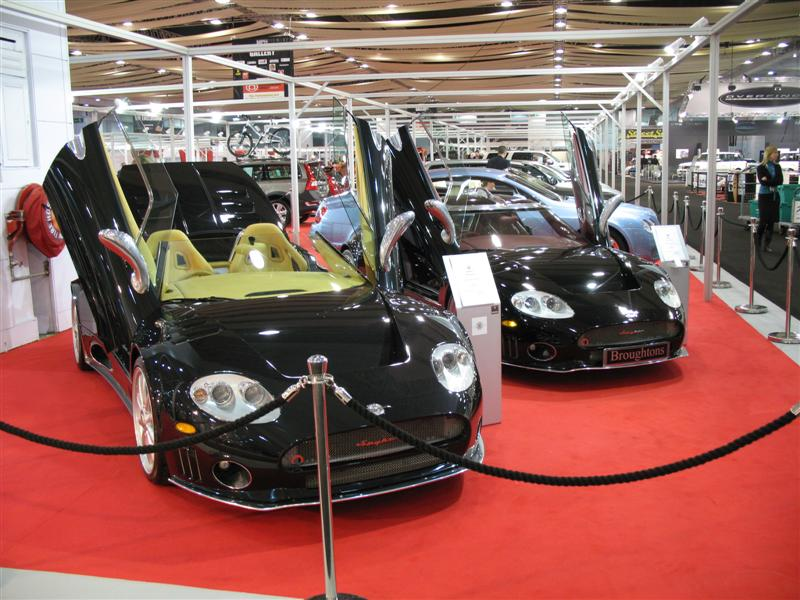
Two Spyker C8 Spyders at MPH 07

Visitors arrive and have the opportunity to take a look at exhibitors' stands. Many are there to advertise a product that they sell (for example there was a 'Shell' stand at MPH '06 advertising Shell V Power) There are also exhibition stands advertising car lease, whilst showing actual cars that can be leased at the stand. These are the likes of the Ferrari Enzo, Lamborghini Murcielago LP640, Ferrari F430 or the Aston Martin DBS V12.

There are also a few car manufacturers exhibiting, although not to the scale of the 'Sunday Times Motor Show'. At MPH 2006, Land Rover turned half of the hall into a simulated off-road environment with ramps and severe slopes, on which people could drive the new Land Rover Discovery 3.

There are also VIP enclosures such as 'The Sunday Times' enclosure, or the 'Auto Express' enclosure in which people with VIP tickets can go and enjoy a glass of wine for example. Overall, the exhibition side of the show is very trade based and does not include many car manufacturers.

== Main show ==
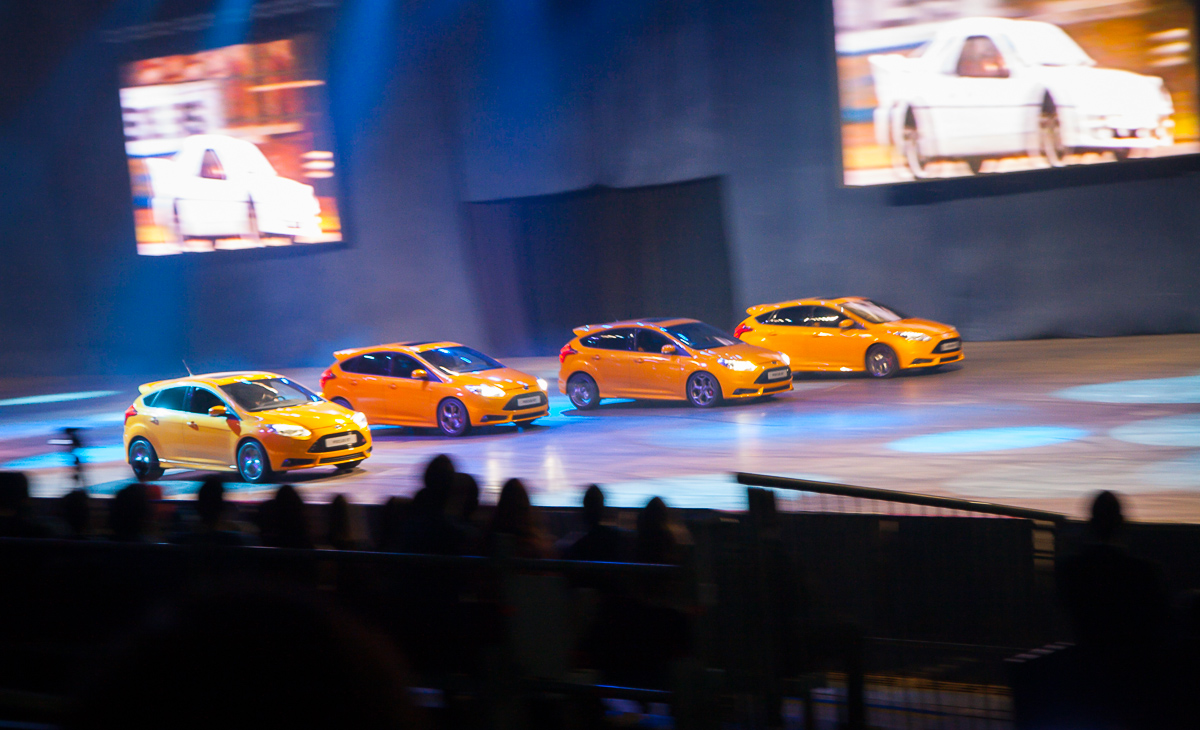
A Top Gear Live show in Moscow, 2013

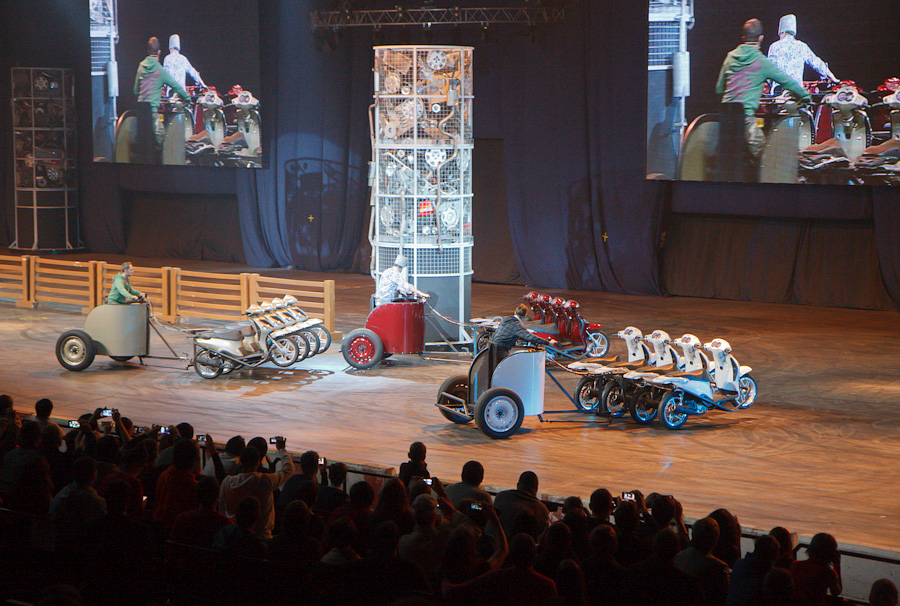
Chariot racing with motorcycles at a live show in 2012

The main event is a 90-minute show, which takes up an entire hall and has the audience sitting in stadium-like seating. The show features stunt driving and a catwalk-style presentation of new cars. Also included in the show are the usual team antics, well known from Top Gear and TGT; at MPH 2006 they placed James May in a shopping trolley and pushed him across the hall with a Ford Mustang at 40 mph into huge ten-pin bowling skittles.

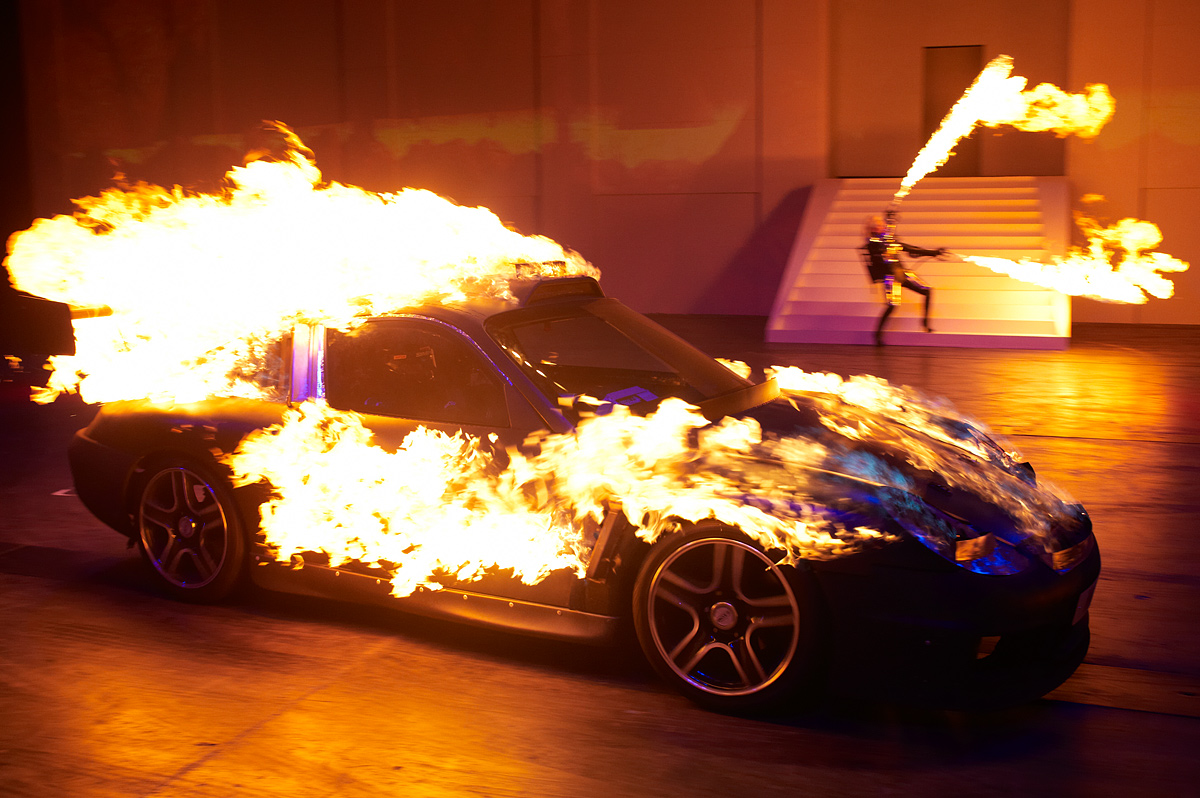
Stunts are performed during the show

There were also 3D presentations during the show; for example MPH 2005, included a virtual and life-size 3D Apache helicopter shooting at a real Lotus Elise as it raced around the arena. Pyrotechnics added live explosions to the display, simulating missile hits and ricochets from gunfire; due to its success, it made a return appearance in 2006. MPH 2006 also included a virtual 3D Hummer being dropped out of an aircraft, shot down by a Tornado jet, and landing in pieces in the ocean. A 3D Gatso Camera/Dragon of the future battled it out with the Stig at MPH 2007.

In 2006, the MPH show was presented by Jeremy Clarkson and James May (Top Gear presenters), and Tiff Needell (Fifth Gear presenter) who was drafted in to cover for Richard Hammond who could not make the show due to a crash. At MPH 2007 the presenters were Jeremy Clarkson, James May and Richard Hammond (then the Top Gear presenters).

Exhibited cars in the MPH 2006 show included the Caparo T1, Pagani Zonda F, Jaguar XKR, Lamborghini LP640, Bentley GTC, Koenigsegg CCX, Spyker C8, Spyker D8, Lamborghini Gallardo Spyder, Invicta, and the Porsche Cayenne Magnum black gunsmoke.

== Tours ==
| Year | Title | Hosts | Countries |
|---|---|---|---|
| 2003 | MPH '03 | Jeremy Clarkson | England |
| 2004 | MPH '04 | | England |
| 2005 | | Jeremy Clarkson, Richard Hammond, Tiff Needell | |
| 2006 | | Jeremy Clarkson, James May, Tiff Needell | |
| 2007 | | Jeremy Clarkson, James May, Richard Hammond | |
| 2008 | | | England, Ireland |
| 2009 | | | South Africa, Australia, New Zealand, Hong Kong, England, Ireland |
| 2010 | | | Netherlands, South Africa, Australia, New Zealand, England, Ireland |
| 2011 | Top Gear Live | | Australia, South Africa, Norway, Russia, England, Australia |
| 2012 | Top Gear Live | | Russia, Sweden, Denmark, South Africa, England, Finland |
| 2013 | Top Gear Live | Jeremy Clarkson, James May, Richard Hammond | Russia, Australia, Netherlands, Belgium, South Africa, Poland |
| 2014 | Top Gear Live | Jeremy Clarkson, James May, Richard Hammond | Scotland, Australia, Russia, Barbados, South Africa, Czech Republic, Hungary, Croatia, Italy |
| 2015 | Clarkson, Hammond & May Live (Note: Name changed due to Clarksons firing from Top Gear in March of that year) | Jeremy Clarkson, James May, Richard Hammond | England, Northern Ireland, England, South Africa, Norway, Australia, Poland, England |

List of show dates and venues
| Date | City | Country | Venue |
2003
| December 11-14 | London | England | Earls Court Exhibition Centre |
2004
| December 18-21 | London | England | Earls Court Exhibition Centre |
2008
| October 30 | London | England | Earls Court Exhibition Centre |
| October 31 | London | England | Earls Court Exhibition Centre |
| November 1 | London | England | Earls Court Exhibition Centre |
| November 2 | London | England | Earls Court Exhibition Centre |
| November 13 | Birmingham | England | National Exhibition Centre |
| November 14 | Birmingham | England | National Exhibition Centre |
| November 15 | Birmingham | England | National Exhibition Centre |
| November 16 | Birmingham | England | National Exhibition Centre |
| November 27 | Dublin | Ireland | RDS Simmoncourt |
| November 28 | Dublin | Ireland | RDS Simmoncourt |
| November 29 | Dublin | Ireland | RDS Simmoncourt |
| November 30 | Dublin | Ireland | RDS Simmoncourt |
2009
| January 29 | Johannesburg | South Africa | Coca Cola Dome |
| January 30 | Johannesburg | South Africa | Coca Cola Dome |
| January 31 | Johannesburg | South Africa | Coca Cola Dome |
| February 1 | Johannesburg | South Africa | Coca Cola Dome |
| February 6 | Sydney | Australia | Acer Arena |
| February 7 | Sydney | Australia | Acer Arena |
| February 8 | Sydney | Australia | Acer Arena |
| February 9 | Sydney | Australia | Acer Arena |
| February 12 | Auckland | New Zealand | ASB Showgrounds |
| February 13 | Auckland | New Zealand | ASB Showgrounds |
| February 14 | Auckland | New Zealand | ASB Showgrounds |
| February 15 | Auckland | New Zealand | ASB Showgrounds |
| February 19 | Hong Kong | Hong Kong | Hong Kong Convention and Exhibition Centre |
| February 20 | Hong Kong | Hong Kong | Hong Kong Convention and Exhibition Centre |
| February 21 | Hong Kong | Hong Kong | Hong Kong Convention and Exhibition Centre |
| February 22 | Hong Kong | Hong Kong | Hong Kong Convention and Exhibition Centre |
| November 5 | London | England | Earls Court Exhibition Centre |
| November 6 | London | England | Earls Court Exhibition Centre |
| November 7 | London | England | Earls Court Exhibition Centre |
| November 8 | London | England | Earls Court Exhibition Centre |
| November 12 | Birmingham | England | National Exhibition Centre |
| November 13 | Birmingham | England | National Exhibition Centre |
| November 14 | Birmingham | England | National Exhibition Centre |
| November 15 | Birmingham | England | National Exhibition Centre |
| December 3 | Dublin | Ireland | Royal Dublin Society |
| December 4 | Dublin | Ireland | Royal Dublin Society |
| December 5 | Dublin | Ireland | Royal Dublin Society |
| December 6 | Dublin | Ireland | Royal Dublin Society |
2010
| January 21 | Amsterdam | Netherlands | Heineken Music Hall |
| January 22 | Amsterdam | Netherlands | Heineken Music Hall |
| January 23 | Amsterdam | Netherlands | Heineken Music Hall |
| January 24 | Amsterdam | Netherlands | Heineken Music Hall |
| January 28 | Cape Town | South Africa | Grand Arena |
| January 29 | Cape Town | South Africa | Grand Arena |
| January 30 | Cape Town | South Africa | Grand Arena |
| January 31 | Cape Town | South Africa | Grand Arena |
| February 4 | Johannesburg | South Africa | Coca Cola Dome |
| February 5 | Johannesburg | South Africa | Coca Cola Dome |
| February 6 | Johannesburg | South Africa | Coca Cola Dome |
| February 7 | Johannesburg | South Africa | Coca Cola Dome |
| February 11 | Sydney | Australia | Acer Arena |
| February 12 | Sydney | Australia | Acer Arena |
| February 13 | Sydney | Australia | Acer Arena |
| February 14 | Sydney | Australia | Acer Arena |
| February 18 | Auckland | New Zealand | ASB Showgrounds |
| February 19 | Auckland | New Zealand | ASB Showgrounds |
| February 20 | Auckland | New Zealand | ASB Showgrounds |
| February 21 | Auckland | New Zealand | ASB Showgrounds |
| November 4 | London | England | Earles Court Exhibition Centre |
| November 5 | London | England | Earles Court Exhibition Centre |
| November 6 | London | England | Earles Court Exhibition Centre |
| November 7 | London | England | Earles Court Exhibition Centre |
| November 11 | Birmingham | England | National Exhibition Centre |
| November 12 | Birmingham | England | National Exhibition Centre |
| November 13 | Birmingham | England | National Exhibition Centre |
| November 14 | Birmingham | England | National Exhibition Centre |
2011
| March 3 | Brisbane | Australia | Brisbane Entertainment Centre |
| March 4 | Brisbane | Australia | Brisbane Entertainment Centre |
| March 5 | Brisbane | Australia | Brisbane Entertainment Centre |
| March 6 | Brisbane | Australia | Brisbane Entertainment Centre |
| March 7 | Brisbane | Australia | Brisbane Entertainment Centre |
| March 11 | Melbourne | Australia | Melbourne Showgrounds |
| March 12 | Melbourne | Australia | Melbourne Showgrounds |
| March 13 | Melbourne | Australia | Melbourne Showgrounds |
| March 14 | Melbourne | Australia | Melbourne Showgrounds |
| March 17 | Johannesburg | South Africa | Kyalami |
| March 18 | Johannesburg | South Africa | Kyalami |
| March 19 | Johannesburg | South Africa | Kyalami |
| March 20 | Johannesburg | South Africa | Kyalami |
| March 24 | Oslo | Norway | Oslo Spektrum |
| March 25 | Oslo | Norway | Oslo Spektrum |
| March 26 | Oslo | Norway | Oslo Spektrum |
| March 27 | Oslo | Norway | Oslo Spektrum |
| July 16 | Moscow | Russia | Red Square |
| July 17 | Moscow | Russia | Red Square |
| July 22 | Moscow | Russia | Red Square |
| July 23 | Moscow | Russia | Red Square |
| July 24 | Moscow | Russia | Red Square |
| November 11 | Birmingham | England | National Exhibition Centre |
| November 12 | Birmingham | England | National Exhibition Centre |
| November 13 | Birmingham | England | National Exhibition Centre |
| November 24 | London | England | ExCel, London |
| November 25 | London | England | ExCel, London |
| November 26 | London | England | ExCel, London |
| November 27 | London | England | ExCel, London |
| December 8 | Perth | Australia | Burswood Dome |
| December 9 | Perth | Australia | Burswood Dome |
| December 10 | Perth | Australia | Burswood Dome |
2012
| February 23 | Moscow | Russia | Olympic Stadium (Moscow) |
| February 24 | Moscow | Russia | Olympic Stadium (Moscow) |
| February 25 | Moscow | Russia | Olympic Stadium (Moscow) |
| March 15 | Stockholm | Sweden | Ericsson Globe |
| March 16 | Stockholm | Sweden | Ericsson Globe |
| March 17 | Stockholm | Sweden | Ericsson Globe |
| March 29 | Copenhagen | Denmark | Forum Copenhagen |
| March 30 | Copenhagen | Denmark | Forum Copenhagen |
| March 31 | Copenhagen | Denmark | Forum Copenhagen |
| April 1 | Copenhagen | Denmark | Forum Copenhagen |
| June 16 | Durban | South Africa | Moses Mabhida Stadium |
| June 17 | Durban | South Africa | Moses Mabhida Stadium |
| October 25 | Birmingham | England | National Exhibition Centre |
| October 26 | Birmingham | England | National Exhibition Centre |
| October 27 | Birmingham | England | National Exhibition Centre |
| October 28 | Birmingham | England | National Exhibition Centre |
| November 23 | Helsinki | Finland | Messukeskus Helsinki |
| November 24 | Helsinki | Finland | Messukeskus Helsinki |
| November 25 | Helsinki | Finland | Messukeskus Helsinki |
2013
| February 22 | Moscow | Russia | Olympic Stadium (Moscow) |
| February 23 | Moscow | Russia | Olympic Stadium (Moscow) |
| March 9 | Sydney | Australia | Sydney Motorsport Park |
| March 10 | Sydney | Australia | Sydney Motorsport Park |
| April 26 | Amsterdam | Netherlands | Ziggo Dome |
| April 27 | Amsterdam | Netherlands | Ziggo Dome |
| April 28 | Antwerp | Belgium | Sportpaleis |
| June 15 | Durban | South Africa | Moses Mabhida Stadium |
| June 16 | Durban | South Africa | Moses Mabhida Stadium |
| September 21 | Warsaw | Poland | PGE Narodowy |
2014
| January 17 | Glasgow | Scotland | OVO Hydro |
| January 18 | Glasgow | Scotland | OVO Hydro |
| January 19 | Glasgow | Scotland | OVO Hydro |
| March 8 | Sydney | Australia | Sydney Motorsport Park |
| March 9 | Sydney | Australia | Sydney Motorsport Park |
| March 25 | Moscow | Russia | Olympic Stadium (Moscow) |
| March 26 | Moscow | Russia | Olympic Stadium (Moscow) |
| March 29 | Saint Petersburg | Russia | Ice Palace (Saint Petersburg) |
| May 17 | Saint Philip | Barbados | Bushy Park Circuit |
| May 18 | Saint Philip | Barbados | Bushy Park Circuit |
| June 21 | Durban | South Africa | Moses Mabhida Stadium |
| June 22 | Durban | South Africa | Moses Mabhida Stadium |
| June 27 | Prague | Czech Republic | O2 Arena (Prague) |
| June 28 | Prague | Czech Republic | O2 Arena (Prague) |
| July 1 | Budapest | Hungary | Budapest Sports Arena |
| July 3 | Zagreb | Croatia | Arena Zagreb |
| July 5 | Turin | Italy | Pala Alpitour |
| July 6 | Turin | Italy | Pala Alpitour |
2015
| February 13 | Liverpool | England | Liverpool Echo Arena |
| February 14 | Liverpool | England | Liverpool Echo Arena |
| February 20 | Newcastle | England | Newcastle Metro Radio Arena |
| February 21 | Newcastle | England | Newcastle Metro Radio Arena |
| May 22 | Belfast | Northern Ireland | Odyssey Complex |
| May 23 | Belfast | Northern Ireland | Odyssey Complex |
| May 24 | Belfast | Northern Ireland | Odyssey Complex |
| June 5 | Sheffield | England | Sheffield Arena |
| June 6 | Sheffield | England | Sheffield Arena |
| June 7 | Sheffield | England | Sheffield Arena |
| June 12 | Johannesburg | South Africa | WeBuyCars Dome |
| June 13 | Johannesburg | South Africa | WeBuyCars Dome |
| June 14 | Johannesburg | South Africa | WeBuyCars Dome |
| June 19 | Stavanger | Norway | Sørmarka Arena |
| June 20 | Stavanger | Norway | Sørmarka Arena |
| June 21 | Stavanger | Norway | Sørmarka Arena |
| July 18 | Perth | Australia | RAC Arena |
| July 19 | Perth | Australia | RAC Arena |
| July 25 | Sydney | Australia | Sydney Super Dome |
| July 26 | Sydney | Australia | Sydney Super Dome |
| October 24 | Warsaw | Poland | PGE Narodowy |
| November 27 | London | England | The O2 Arena |
| November 28 | London | England | The O2 Arena |
| November 29 | London | England | The O2 Arena |
