= Caparo Vehicle Technologies =

British vehicle technology company

- Type: Private
- Industry: Automotive
- Founded: 2004 as Freestream Cars Limited
- Founder: Graham Halstead; Ben Scott-Geddes
- Defunct: 2019
- Headquarters: Leamington Spa, United Kingdom
- Key people: Graham Halstead (Founder); Ben Scott-Geddes (Founder); Sean Butcher (Marketing); Angad Paul (Chairman)
- Products: Supercars
- Revenue: £10.08m (2014)

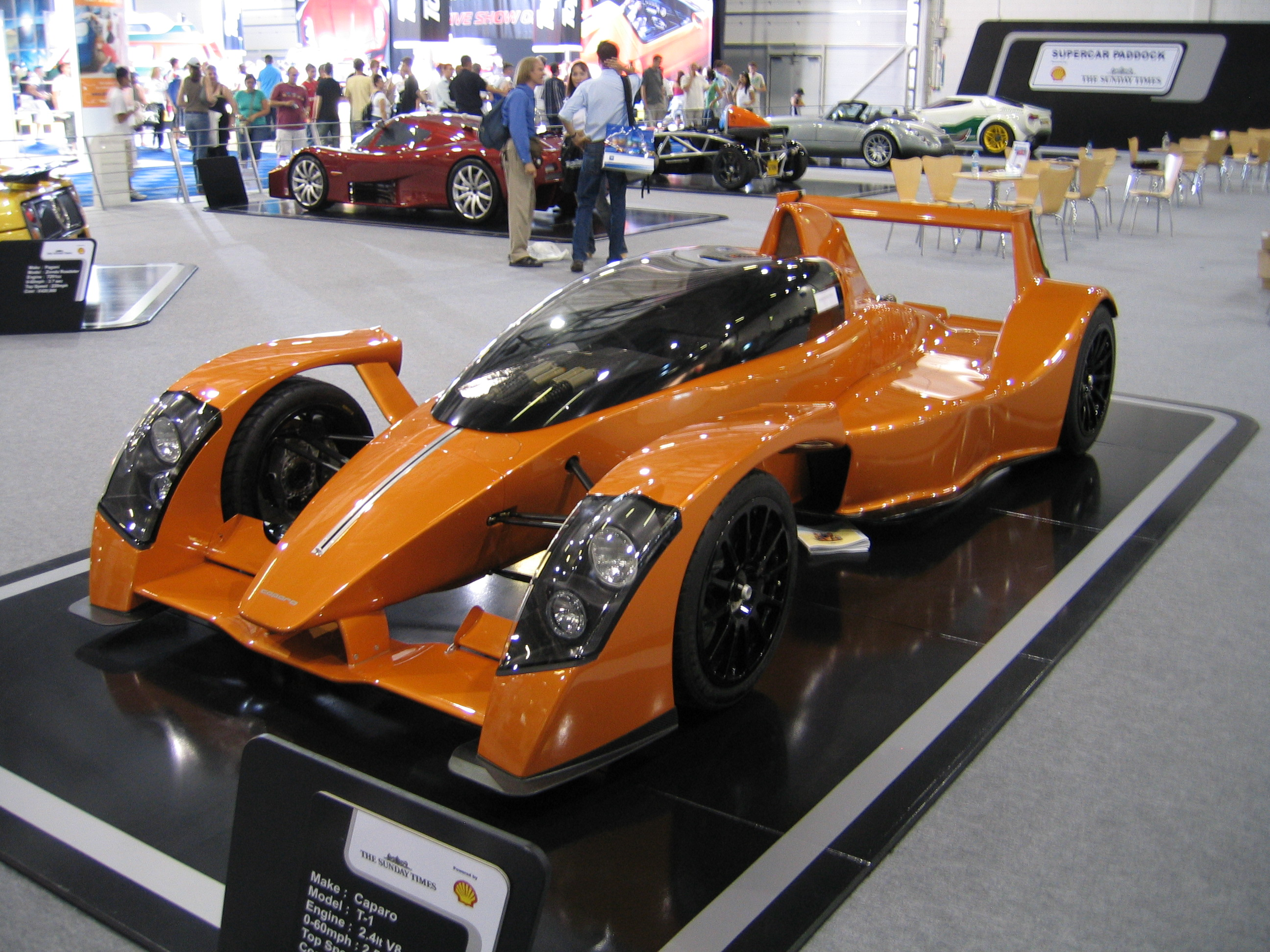
Caparo T1 at the 2006 British International Motor Show

Caparo Vehicle Technologies (CVT), formerly known as Freestream Cars Limited, was a British company that provided advanced technology development, materials engineering, and design services to and markets. Caparo Vehicle Technologies went into administration in 2015, and was fully dissolved by 2019.

== History ==
Caparo Vehicle Technologies was originally founded in 2004 as Freestream Cars Limited by Graham Halstead and Ben Scott-Geddes who had both worked on the McLaren F1 project. In February 2006, Freestream announced a concept car, the Freestream T1. In March 2006, the company was acquired by Caparo. The deal was put together by future Commercial Director, Sean Butcher. After the acquisition, Caparo CEO Angad Paul became chairman.

== Vehicles ==
Caparo Vehicle Technologies produced one vehicle, the Caparo T1. The T1 is a two-seat, rear wheel drive automobile inspired by Formula 1 racecars. The company sold the racecar for $300,000, and had confirmed purchases for 15 cars by 2012.

== Administration and closure ==
The company entered administration in 2015 just days after the death of Caparo CEO, Angad Paul. The company was liquidated and fully dissolved by 2019.

== See also ==
- Caparo
- Caparo T1
- List of car manufacturers of the United Kingdom
