= Playr =

British television series

- Playr logo
- Voices of: Marc Cieslak
- Country of origin: United Kingdom

Production
- Executive producer: Richard Wilcox
- Running time: 24 minutes
- Production company: Playr Ltd.

Original release
- Network: Bravo (2008-2009); Film 24 (2009-2010); Showcase TV (2011-2013)
- Release: 3 May 2008 – January 2013

Playr is a TV show about video gaming that aired weekly in a number of locations around the world, including the UK, Canada, South America, Spain, South Africa and across Asia. The show mixed in-depth previews, news, reviews and features on video games and is notable for its entertaining approach to the subject. Playr was executive produced by Richard Wilcox, whose credits include GamesMaster, When Games Attack and Gamer.tv.

From 20 November 2009 to 19 October 2010, episodes also appeared on Playr's official YouTube channel, in up to 720p resolution. Full length segments from the show are also available.

It was distributed outside the UK by IMG Media.

== History ==
From 3 May 2008 until April 2009, Playr aired Saturday and Sunday mornings on Bravo. Repeats of the show were shown on Bravo 2. Until January 2009, the series had two sister programmes on Bravo: Playr Guide and Playr 2. The show is voiced by Marc Cieslak, previous narrators include comedian Rufus Hound and Tim Beckmann. On 25 April 2009, Playr ceased airing on Bravo.

The series returned to UK screens on 5 September 2009 on Film 24. After the 22 May 2010 episode, the show was forced off the air after Film 24 refused to pay any outstanding fees and later entered liquidation.

Playr returned once again to UK screens on 5 June 2011 for an initial 6-month run on the Information TV group of channels. New episodes premiered on Tuesdays at 6:00 pm on Showcase TV, followed by Playr Guide, with repeats aired throughout the week. In January 2013, the last episode of Playr aired mentioning that the programme would be gone for some time but on 19 March 2013 a post on the Playr website confirmed that the show was not in production and that it had probably finished.
