= Need to Know (newsletter) =

Defunct email newsletter (1997–2007)

Need To Know, also known as NTK, was an email newsletter, published late on Fridays, written by former Wired journalist and Irish Times columnist Danny O'Brien and former Wired and Future journalist Dave Green. It was devised in 1996 while Green and O'Brien worked at Wired. NTK was published weekly from 1997 until 2004, when it moved to fortnightly publication. From May 2005 until July 2006 it continued on a monthly schedule, though it often ran late; the final newsletter on the website is a "MiniNTK" dated 8 January 2007.

The newsletter billed itself as "the weekly tech update for the UK" (later "week^H^H^H^H fortnightly" or "week^H^H^H^H now-monthly") and presented the highlights of the week's happenings in the IT, blogosphere and general internet community, with a focus on UK culture and politics. It also looked at less weighty matters such as confectionery and nudity in films. It took an irreverent tone similar to The Register, Private Eye and Viz.

== Format ==
The newsletter is also available on the World Wide Web and has used a fixed-width ASCII text-based layout since its inception. It was sent to subscribers in plain text email. Since 2004, the website has offered readers the ability to use their own style sheet.

Each newsletter comprised (at least some of) the following sections:

- An ASCII art representation of the letters "NTKnow", along with the strapline and date.
- An ironic or amusing quote of the week, not seen since April 2005, when NTK was weekly.
- HARD NEWS: Important, but not necessarily mainstream, news stories from the IT world during that week. Each story is accompanied by URLs for further reading.
- ANTI-NEWS, later ANTI-MEMES: A collection of "D'Oh!"s; errors in mainstream news articles such as using the wrong image for a story, typos, inappropriate web adverts, meta-information for editors or page filler that was accidentally published unedited, or even outright nonsense like "Columbia: shuttle travelling nearly 18 times the speed of light". This section was later spun off into a separate site, D'Oh! the humanity! (now defunct). From 2002 onwards, the section also intermittently included themed lists of "google goofs": Google results for searches using misspellings such as "first aid tit" or "penny farting".
- EVENT QUEUE: Events to attend that may be of interest to technologically minded people. This included visits to the UK by open source leaders, sci-fi conventions and blogging conferences, as well as talks and seminars by the NTK writers and their friends. The selections were frequently London-centric, attracting criticism from readership living north of Watford Gap, although with O'Brien's move to California, the geographical range of events covered widened; Burning Man usually merited an annual mention.
- TRACKING: Focussed on interesting, useful, or just plain esoteric software. The selection was not limited to any particular platform; software for Linux, Microsoft Windows and Mac OS X all features regularly, and occasionally software for the C64 and ZX Spectrum, such as a mini TCP/IP stack, was included if it was particularly interesting or could be mocked in an amusing fashion. The section also sometimes included reviews of web-services like BugMeNot rather than conventional software.
- MEMEPOOL: like Memepool, a collection of the week's best Internet memes.
- GEEK MEDIA: short synopses of television programmes or films that are of interest to a geek audience. Films also include BBFC ratings for added irony.
- After the geek media section, there was a schedule of rotating extra items, including "Confectionery Theory" (reviewing new sweets upon their arrival in the UK, later outsourced to snackspot.org.uk), "feebdack" (as a form of letters page; the title referring to a coinage in Rudy Rucker's The Hacker and the Ants), "boners" (correction of errors in NTK itself), and an occasional music review section.
- SMALL PRINT: Other than containing the basic meta-information that NTK is a newsletter, published every week, etc., this section always included the motto "THEY STOLE OUR REVOLUTION. NOW WE'RE STEALING IT BACK" and the phrase "Registered at the Post Office as", which is usually completed by an oblique reference to another website or publication that has itself referenced NTK, Danny or Dave. For example, it linked to their Wikipedia article in October 2004.

== Significant events ==
February 1998
NTK launched the Falco competition, named after the rock star Falco who died that week. Readers were encouraged to email their predictions of which technology companies would fail (dot-bombs), and NTK would proclaim "FALCO" with the list of accurate tipsters when announcing that companies had actually failed. This practise predated Fucked Company by two years.
December 1998
NTK launched STAND.org.uk (now defunct), a UK campaign group lobbying for fair UK internet policy.
February 2000
NTK launched Kevin Warwick Watch (now defunct) in reaction to Kevin Warwick's sudden popularity in the mainstream press.
September 2000
NTK launched a "drily ironic t-shirt competition", where readers can come up with amusing T-shirt designs and NTK can sell the results back to them.
December 2000
NTK launched "Fax your MP", now known as WriteToThem. They also launched their own ironic T-shirt sales site NTKMart (now defunct) with the first winner of their competition: "I got £80million in venture capital for my .com idea and all I have left is this lousy t-shirt".
August 2001
NTK published the now infamous "dancemonkeyboy" video of Steve Ballmer dancing to Gloria Estefan music at a developer conference.
June 2002
NTK hosted their own conference, X-COM 2002.
March 2003
NTK launched snackspot.org.uk (now defunct).
June 2004
NTK hosted another conference, NotCon '04.
August 2004
NTK launched dohthehumanity.com (now defunct).
September 2005
NTK launched the Open Rights Group.
