= Andy Collins (TV presenter) =

British television host and personality

- Born: 4 July 1970 (age 55)
- Occupation: Presenter
- Known for: Presenting Family Fortunes (2002)

Andrew Collins (born 4 July 1970) is a British television and radio personality.

== Career ==
During the 1990s, Collins presented Game Over, a show on BSkyB's short-lived computer and technology channel .tv. In 1993, he won a Golden Joystick and a date with emcee Monie Love by winning a SNES Cool Spot challenge on Channel 4's GamesMaster.

In 2000, Collins co-presented Lost in the Woods as Novice to the survival Guru John "Brummie" Stokes, a 15 episode show that aired on Discovery Travel & Living.

From September 2002 to January 2003, Collins presented the British daytime version of Family Fortunes, taking over from Les Dennis, a show based on the United States TV show Family Feud. In 2005, Collins appeared on the chat show Heads Up with Richard Herring to discuss his life and career.

Since June 2016, Collins has presented the breakfast show on BBC Three Counties Radio, replacing Iain Lee.

He also has been the compere and warm up man for shows such as Ant and Dec's Saturday Night Takeaway and ITV's National Television Awards.

He is a regular star of Aylesbury Waterside Theatre's Christmas pantomime, usually playing the comedic sidekick character.

Preceded by Les Dennis	Host of Family Fortunes; 2002 (one series - daytime version)	Succeeded by Vernon Kay
