= Danny O'Brien (journalist) =

British journalist and activist (born 1969)

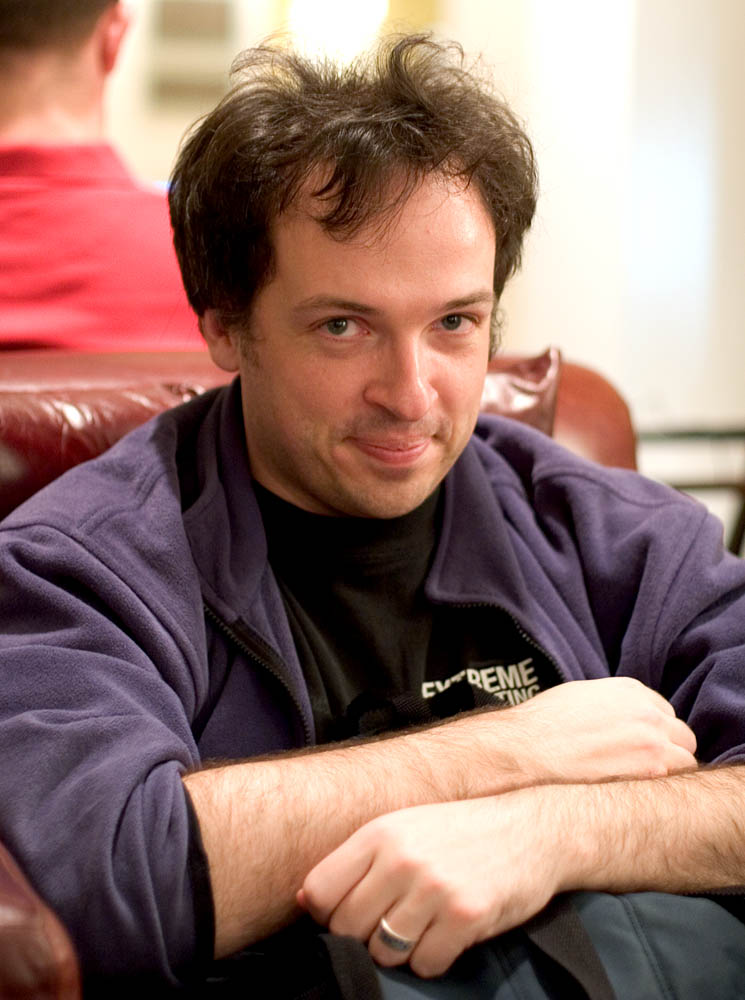
- O'Brien at ETech in 2005
- Born: 1969 (age 56–57)
- Occupations: International Director, Electronic Frontier Foundation
- Spouse: Liz Henry

Danny O'Brien (born 1969) is a British technology journalist and civil liberties activist. He was the international director of the Electronic Frontier Foundation.

== Career ==
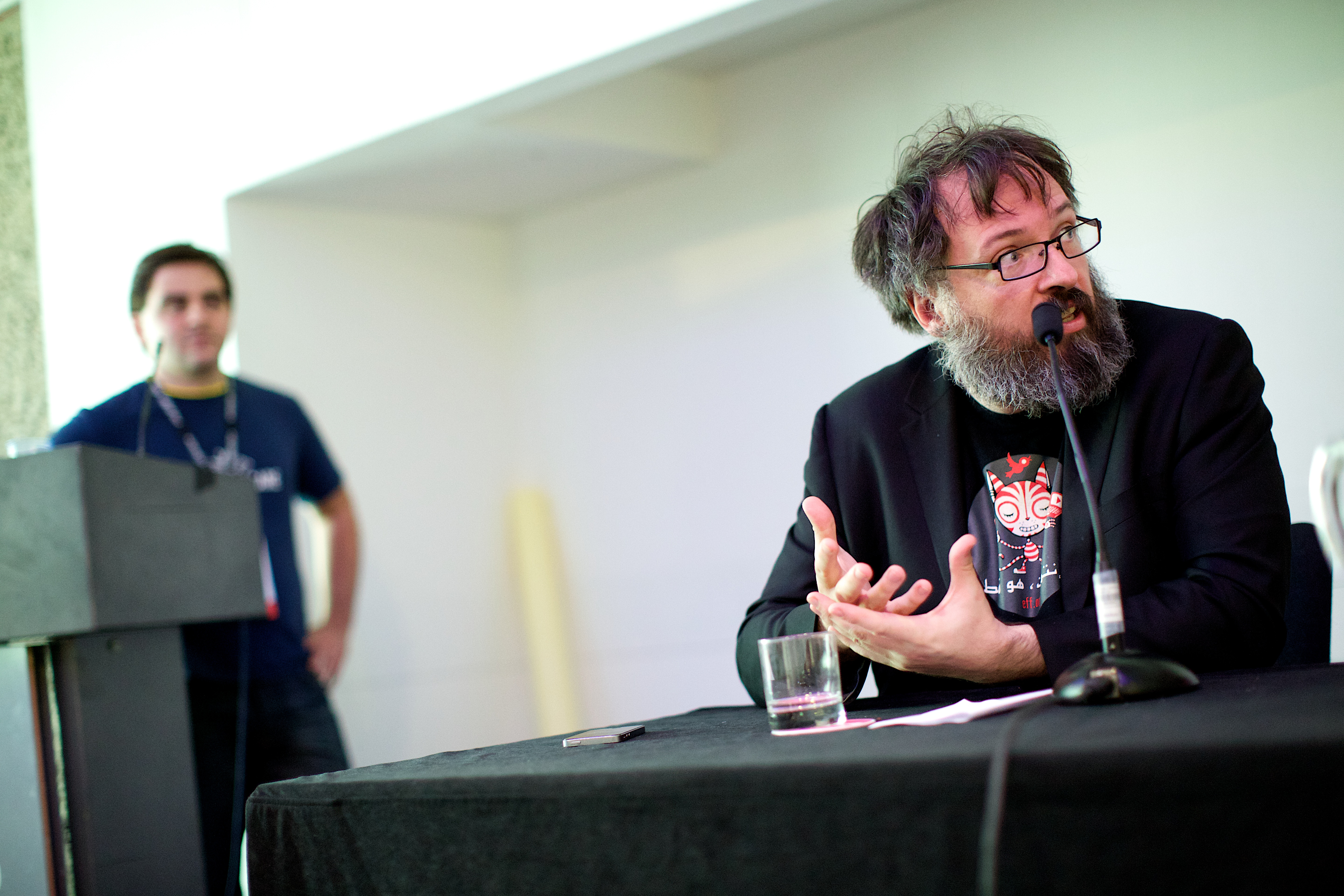
Danny O'Brien (on right) in 2014 at Wikimania

O'Brien wrote weekly columns for The Sunday Times and The Irish Times; and before that for The Guardian, and acted as a consultant in helping The Guardian formulate its online strategy. He worked for the UK edition of Wired, as well as for Channel 4 and the British Internet service provider Virgin.net. Together with Dave Green, he founded and wrote the now-defunct email newsletter Need to Know and with whom he also co-wrote and co-presented the television show 404 Not Found.

In May 2005, he succeeded Ren Bucholz as activist coordinator for the Electronic Frontier Foundation, and then became EFF's international outreach coordinator. In April 2010, he moved to a new position as Internet advocacy coordinator for the Committee to Protect Journalists. In February 2013, he became the director of the International Department at the Electronic Frontier Foundation.

He was director of strategy at the EFF from July 2019 – June 2021.

He became a senior fellow at the Filecoin Foundation, and Filecoin Foundation for the Decentralized Web in July 2021.

O'Brien also set up a pledge on PledgeBank to help coordinate the establishment of "an organisation that will campaign for digital rights in the UK", which led to the creation of the Open Rights Group.

== Family ==
O'Brien is married to Liz Henry. He was previously married to Quinn Norton, with whom he has a daughter.

== See also ==
- Life hack
