= Will Hanrahan =

British producer and presenter

- Hanrahan in 2026
- Occupations: Journalist, producer

William Hanrahan is a British television/radio producer and presenter best known for working on BBC programmes such as Watchdog and Good Morning. Since 1994 he has headed an independent TV company which currently produces studio programming and documentaries for the BBC and Sky TV, A&E, Foxtel, Netflix, CBS, Discovery and UKTV. He is a three-times Royal Television Society Award winner and his programmes are currently airing in over 70 countries. He has executive produced for both the BBC and ITV working with Alistair McGowan on the BBC Restoration project, and Chris Tarrant on the BBC Four History of the World in 100 objects series. He is a law graduate with experience in consumer and legal programming. In 2013/14, Hanrahan also returned to radio presenting as a guest host on BBC Radio in 2014 and 2015. In 2017, his legal TV series The Jury Room for CBS Reality also saw him present a six-part Podcast.

== Early life and education ==
Hanrahan grew up in Bootle, an area near Liverpool. He was educated at St. Benet's, now St. Benedicts, and St. Mary's College in Crosby and later completed an Open University degree, a law degree at Birmingham University and an MBA.

== Career ==
Hanrahan trained as a journalist on the Bootle Times newspaper. He subsequently embarked on a career as a radio and television journalist eventually presenting breakfast shows on BBC Radio York, LBC (London) and Sunday chat shows for syndicated BBC radio stations in the north of England, BBC Look North (Yorkshire and North Midlands) and BBC Spotlight where he fronted the regional news magazine alongside Jill Dando. For Network TV his early work was for BBC News notably working as a reporter during the Rwandan Civil War, presenting live from refugee camps and an orphanage in Goma in the Democratic Republic of the Congo (then Zaire) at the height of the humanitarian crisis.

Hanrahan presented a range of other programmes for the BBC, including working as an investigative journalist for Watchdog, The Food Programme, Family Matters, On The Line, and Verdict. He was a general presenter for the BBC TWO series, The Arts and Crafts Hour, and was a contributor to the mid-1990s BBC mid-morning programme Good Morning with Anne and Nick. and also, alongside Sarah Greene, Good Morning Summer. He helped devise and front the BBC TWO mid-evening series, Out+About, with David Gower, Suzanne Dando and Jeremy Guscott which ran for four series and then became the face of the Sky Computer Channel .tv. During this time he clinched factual, factual entertainment and entertainment series for ITV, UKTV, BBC and Channel 5 with Hanrahan working principally as a Producer.

His presenting work was mainly restricted to longer term investigative programming though he did front the Channel 5 German-formatted series Hanrahan Investigates in 2010 and in 2017 and 2018 he presented for CBS in the UK fronting The Jury Room. The programme re-examines real murder cases where convicted killers have always maintained their innocence. Drawing on his investigative journalist background, Hanrahan led a so-called People's Jury to reach a fresh verdict.

=== Presenting outside of the BBC ===
As a presenter, he fronted Serve You Right a consumer rights series for Meridian T.V. presented Buyers Guide and Blue Chip for BSkyB's .tv technology channel. and, in 2007, for the Sunday Breakfast show for BBC CWR.

In 2008 he presented Suffolk Strangler for Sky Television, the story of the serial killer, Steve Wright. He then self-produced Dunblane – A Decade On for Channel Five. In 2009, Hanrahan was a reporter and writer of a series of Documentaries related to Crime for Sky TV.

Alongside his documentaries, he has produced entertainment programming such as the four-year ITV series, Star Lives, and the BBC comedy Trexx and Flipside.

== Hanrahan Media ==
Hanrahan launched his own media production company, Hanrahan Media, in 1994, with Fatherhood, a series of TV essays for BBC One. Programs produced by the company include Star Lives for ITV 1, SuDoKu Live for Sky one, and Carol Vorderman's Brain Game, as well as documentaries for ITV and Channel Five. In 2008/09 the Hanrahan-produced Trexx and Flipside became the first sit-com produced for the BBC out of the English Midlands. The six-part series featured viewer-generated Hip-Hop and a largely new-to-TV cast. Hanrahan also developed a comedy-panel show for UK channel 'Dave' which ran for two series. Street Cred SuDoKu lampooned anything and everything that had ever been fashionable before disappearing from popular culture.

The company has received a Royal Television Society award for Best Entertainment in 2002 for Stars And Their Lives, and in 2009 for Best News and Current Affairs and Best Documentary.

== firstlooktv ==
Firstlooktv launched in 2010 specifically to make documentaries and gaining commissions from ITV with Going to Work Naked, "Norway Massacre:The Survivors", Channel 5, the Crime and Investigation Channel, with "Evil Up Close" and the Arts and Entertainment network's International division in New York. Additional episodes of the series premiered in Australia late 2012 and the UK in Autumn 2012. In 2013 and 2014, firstlooktv became one of the first British companies to win a direct commission from an Italian broadcaster as its series Segreti, Bugie e Omicidi (Secrets, Lies and Murders) premiered. From 2014 until 2018, FirstLookTV produced over 120 hours of documentary television with series airing on UKTV, Netflix, CBS and A&E.

Throughout the period, firstlooktv also gained commissions with the BBC featuring presenters Alistair McGowan, Chris Tarrant and Adrian Chiles. McGowan fronted a BBC One "Restoration" special, Tarrant presented a History programme charting the importance of canals to the success of Britain's Industrial Revolution. whilst Chiles fronted a special 1966 retrospective for BBC ONE. Firstlooktv was also commissioned to produce the BBC football series Late Kick Off.

== Other activities ==
Hanrahan's hobbies include following Everton Football Club and supporting the Arts. He was chair of The Stratford ArtsHouse from 2012 to 2016, and is a governor of Compton Verney House art gallery and grounds. He is an active contributor to the community of Stratford-upon-Avon where he has chaired Stratford Vision, a non-political group made up of businesses, local authority members and charities.
