= Caparo =

British steel company

- Headquarters: Gaydon, UK
- Key people: Swraj Paul; Angad Paul
- Subsidiaries: Caparo Vehicle Technologies

Caparo plc is a British company involved mainly in the steel industry, primarily in the design, manufacturing and marketing of steel and niche engineering products.

== History ==
Caparo was founded by Lord Swraj Paul in 1968.

A court case involving Caparo, Caparo Industries plc v Dickman, dated to 1990, has become the standard in cases where it is necessary to establish negligence.

The group was headed by Angad Paul, the son of Lord Paul, from 1996, until his death on 8 November 2015. In 2006, Paul acquired the supercar manufacturer Freestream Cars Limited, later renamed Caparo Vehicle Technologies, and released the supercar Caparo T1.

According to a text published 1995, the Caparo group specialized in take-overs. At the time of publishing, the company had fixed assets and investments (having been quoted), of £26 million.

=== Administration ===
Sixteen companies within the group were put into administration in October 2015, leaving three to continue trading as normal.

One month later, following Angad Pauls death, Sanjeev Gupta, head of Liberty House Group, announced that his family had bought a part of the business from the administrators. Liberty House bought Caparo Merchant Bar – one of the three solvent parts of the business that had continued trading – from the administrators in 2017. While CMB had remained solvent, its ability to develop had been restricted by its ties to a pension scheme of its former parent group. Numerous other deals by the administrators saw many companies within the group sold, with consequent savings in jobs.

== See also ==
- Caparo Industries plc v Dickman
- Caparo Vehicle Technologies
