= GamesMaster =

British TV programme

- Genre: Entertainment
- Created by: Jane Hewland
- Presented by: Original series: Dominik Diamond (Series 1–2, 4–7); Dexter Fletcher (Series 3); Revived series: Robert Florence; Frankie Ward (co-presenter); Ty Logan (co-presenter)
- Starring: GamesMaster: Sir Patrick Moore (Original series); Sir Trevor McDonald (Revived series)
- Country of origin: United Kingdom
- Original language: English
- No. of series: 8
- No. of episodes: 129

Production
- Running time: 30 mins (Original series); 60 mins (Series 4 "Gore Special" episode, Revived series) (inc. adverts)
- Production companies: Hewland International (Original series); Future Studios (Revived series)

Original release
- Network: Channel 4
- Release: 7 January 1992 – 3 February 1998
- Network: E4
- Release: 21 November – 5 December 2021

Related
- Games World

GamesMaster is a British television programme which originally aired on Channel 4 from 1992 to 1998. In 2021, it returned for a new series on YouTube and E4. It was the first UK television programme dedicated to video games.

Dominik Diamond was the host for six of the original seven series while astronomer Sir Patrick Moore featured as the GamesMaster. He was replaced in 2021 with Sir Trevor McDonald. The show's format consists of a mixture of game reviews, small "features", tips and challenges. Challenges form the biggest section of the show and generally consist of "average" players and celebrities, often competing against each other for the coveted Golden Joystick.

== Origins ==
GamesMaster began when Jane Hewland, formerly of London Weekend Television, who had set up her own production company Hewland International, took an interest in her son's love of video games. She put together a pitch for a programme that would translate the excitement of games playing into watchable television. After some rejection, Hewland put together a video interviewing her son's friends about why they loved video games. It was Channel 4 that became interested in the concept and approved the production, though they only provided an initial budget of £10,000 per episode for a 10 episode first season.

== Format and hosts ==
Although it featured game reviews, most of the programme was about challenges where game players would compete as sole competitors and complete a level on a video game or against one another, in which this would either be playing individually against each other, or in a head-to-head contest. Contestants who were successful at their challenges were rewarded with the coveted "GamesMaster Golden Joystick" trophy. Dominik Diamond usually presented the programme with Sir Patrick Moore appearing in pre-recorded inserts as the 'Games Master'. During these challenges, Dominik was joined by a host of commentators. These included Derrick Lynch, Kirk Ewing, Julian Rignall, Rik Henderson, Dave Perry, Tim Boone and Neil West amongst others.

For the third series, Dexter Fletcher became the main presenter; this change was criticised by fans, who saw the new host as over-the-top, and too 'in-your-face'. To balance this, the production company dropped all other co-presenters and gave UK games champion Dave Perry a regular co-presenter slot on every episode. Fletcher was better known at the time for having played an American character called "Spike" in the ITV drama series Press Gang.

== Review segments ==
From the very first episode, GamesMaster included reviews of forthcoming titles. In an attempt to give the programme some authority and get the gaming press on their side, as well as eliminate the need for extra staff to review games, the reviews featured a host of magazines journalists from the publishing house EMAP. This meant the programme could pool the collective opinions of magazines like Mean Machines, C&VG and ACE.

However, by series 5, it was decided that the reviews would be better presented by two of the programme's co-commentators, namely Rik Henderson and Dave Perry. It brought a much-needed stability to the format and some interesting banter between the reviewers. Series 6 also featured Rik, who was now joined by Ed Lomas, while series 7, due to time constraints and Dave Perry having resigned from the programme's cast (after complaining on-air about being "set up" during a Super Mario 64 challenge), employed two of its own research staff to present the slot, including Richard Pitt.

== Stage set ==
Each series was set in a different location, with an in-universe narrative given for the changes of set, such as series 2 being set on an oil rig, which is evacuated at end of series 2 due to an explosion. The opening to series 3 has Dexter Fletcher announcing that the previous host (who had left the programme) had not survived. Diamond would later return in series 4 onwards which was set in Hell and then in Heaven for series 5. In the opening credits to series 6 Diamond was portrayed as falling from Heaven. The series 7 titles were a dream sequence in which Diamond travelled to the series' island setting.

Every series following Series 2 had the original series' closing moments portrayed in the series itself as the previous "set" being deconstructed in some manner. In the final series, the set was literally dismantled and the studio closed down over Diamond's final words.

== Relationship with the games industry ==
Prior to GamesMaster appearing, games companies had very few TV programmes on which to have their titles featured. UK broadcasters had shown sporadic interest in the scene, normally confining coverage to segments within Saturday morning children's programming. From time to time, news programmes would report on one of the very successful British games studios, but in contrast to programming involving films and music videos, there was no regular showcase for video games.

GamesMaster was first broadcast in 1992, during the fourth (16-bit) console generation - after the launch of the Mega Drive, but before the SNES. Sega's success in the early 90s (with both the Master System and Mega Drive, as well as the huge hit game Sonic the Hedgehog) helped cause a video game console boom in 1991, bringing gaming into mainstream UK culture, which would only increase following the arrival of consoles with more advanced graphics capabilities, such as those found on the PlayStation. That GamesMaster regularly drew in audiences in the millions proved that there was a huge and so far untapped audience.

Despite competition with specialist gaming magazines, the programme managed to secure several exclusives over the series, showing games that were months or even years away from being finished. Because GamesMaster was largely a challenge-based programme, games studios could, for example, present a single level to be used for these competitive segments. Blast Corps is one example of a game that was demonstrated long before it, or even the Nintendo 64 that it played on, were released.

Occasionally, games studios made levels specifically for use on one of the challenges. Shiny Entertainment were one such studio when they put together a special level of Earthworm Jim. Though this worked out well for both game studio and the programme, the experience was somewhat soured when this code ended up being leaked on the Internet. It is believed that the only way for this to have happened is that one of the staff on the programme must have had links with online ROM crackers. It led to a great deal of embarrassment and likely upset the trust that existed between the producer, Shiny Entertainment and their publisher, Virgin Interactive.

== Gamesmaster sponsorship ==
- McDonald's (9 September 1993 – 14 January 1995) (Series 3 and 4)
- Meta Quest 2 (21 November 2021 – present) (Series 8)

== Demise ==
Prior to GamesMaster leaving UK television, there had been a crisis of confidence in games television over at rival channel ITV. Their children's department had commissioned another video games programme T.I.G.S. to accompany Bad Influence!. Then, one series later, they pulled the plug on both programmes, deciding that there was no demand for games coverage on their channel.

GamesMaster was not affected and continued with success. In 1998, towards the end of production for the 7th series, the programme was looking set to be re-commissioned; viewing figures were still strong, and the programme was finding a new audience, benefiting from the emerging PlayStation culture with the success of Sony's console bringing gaming into the mainstream. The production was also more oriented towards actual games players than the first few series, which had been decidedly light in feature content, and no longer poked fun at 'nerds' and 'geeks', as it was young adults and not children and teenagers who appeared on the programme; indeed, they and the publicity-seeking celebrities were now the subject of jokes.

It is believed that Dominik Diamond, along with the programme's producers, wanted to make a more adult programme that would air in a late night, more mainstream time slot. (Series 8 was going to be set on a pirate ship with buxom wenches as the Golden Joystick assistants.) There was also talk of a spin-off programme being made that would seek to emulate the US talk shows of the time. Whether this would have meant a programme that focused far less on games is unknown. No confirmation exists that any pilots of this concept were ever made; Channel 4 did not see the potential of a gaming programme for an older, adult audience.

However, changes in senior staff at Channel 4 were responsible for taking the programme off the air. The new head of Channel 4 was Michael Jackson who had worked at LWT at the same time as Jane Hewland; the two never saw eye-to-eye. Alternatively, having been the head of BBC Two, Jackson may have wanted less entertainment programming on Channel 4.

The first series of the programme was repeated on Challenge in 2003, but no further episodes have been shown. Challenge thought the programme was "too dated" and "the games being played wouldn't stand up today".

== Broadcasting spin-offs ==
Several gaming shows were commissioned by Sky 1 in 1993 from Hewland International (one of which was Games World). Due to this close relationship with BSkyB, Hewland International were even successful in convincing them to launch a whole new channel dedicated to gaming, computers, the internet and technology. The Computer Channel launched in 1996 for only BSkyB subscribers, appearing for just two hours every night. Originally, the only gaming show was Game Over, made by some of the same production team as Gamesmaster and Games World. When The Computer Channel was relaunched as .tv in 1998, other shows began to start covering the gaming scene. These included Gear, Roadtest, ExMachina and also Games Republic.

The latter show was closest in style and tone to Gamesmaster, featured a themed studio set, studio challenges and the irreverent presenters Trevor and Simon. Though the show did not include any features or VT content, as it was a question based game show based on video games, it was produced by Gamesmaster and When Games Attack producer Johnny Ffinch. The series unfortunately came under fire from fans after several questions asked in the show had incorrect answers, infuriating several contestants over the series. (For example, poorly researched questions about the Dreamcast's online capabilities, and characters from Tekken).

Dominik Diamond returned to games television first as an interviewee in the 1999 documentary Games Wars, in which he commented that boys getting turned on by Lara Croft was tragic and "desperately sad". He then returned to presenting in 2004 with a show on Bravo, called When Games Attack. This programme was largely feature-based and contained plenty of Dominik's trademark humour. Prior to its broadcast, Dominik featured in a sizable Edge interview, with his longtime producer Johnny Finch. Both of them were quite vocal in stating their contempt for other shows about video games that were doing a bad job.

Though it did also feature minor celebrity challenges (mainly football players and glamour models), there were never any head-to-head competitions. To date, Bravo has yet to show a second series. However, in November 2007, a repeat of the only series to date was aired.

In 1999, the BBC filmed two pilot episodes of a new TV show franchise dedicated to video games titled Bleeding Thumbs - with Gamesmaster's Rik Henderson as assistant producer and initial commentator. The series would have run between 1999 and 2000 alternating with the hugely successful "Robot Wars", hoping to emulate the success GamesMaster achieved in the process. Two pilots were filmed and were hosted by Dermot O'Leary and Kate Thornton, and then Terry Alderton accompanying Thornton, the commissioning editor decommissioned the show claiming that "People want to play games, not watch them".

GamesMaster was also the first UK show to feature the sport of robot fighting in a news item, which at the time was on Local Public-access television in the US. Hewland International worked for several years to translate the sport into something for UK viewers. Though they never succeeded, another production company, Mentorn, were able to get their show concept Robot Wars picked up by BBC Two.

== Revival ==
In February 2021, Channel 4 announced that they were looking for a brand partner for a potential reboot of GamesMaster. According to the description of the format, celebrities will "undergo challenges, races and fights in virtual battle across all genres of gaming under the watchful eye of the all-knowing GamesMaster". On 29 September 2021, Frankie Ward, Robert Florence, and Ty Logan were announced as the new hosts. Episodes will first appear on E4's YouTube channel before broadcast on the E4 television channel. On 25 October 2021 it was announced that Sir Trevor McDonald would be the new GamesMaster. The series was filmed at Crossness Pumping Station in Abbey Wood, London from 5 to 6 October 2021.

On 10 November 2022, Channel 4 announced that GamesMaster would continue to another series after being successful in social platforms. The next series was announced to be broadcast on social media in 2023 though as of 2026, no broadcast has taken place.

== Magazine ==
In January 1993, Future Publishing began a tie-in magazine, also called GamesMaster. In the May issue of 2010, Editor-in-chief Robin Alway announced that Future Publishing were 'looking into' reintroducing the programme to British television, and promised that he would keep the readers of the magazine informed of any future details. The magazine ceased publishing in November 2018, having outlasted the original TV series by more than twenty years.

== Series details and celebrity guests ==
Series	Start date	End date	Episodes	Air time	Setting	Servant
1	7 January 1992	10 March 1992	10	Tuesdays at 6:30pm	Church (St Paul's Church, Dock Street, London)	Monk - Dave Perry
2	1 October 1992	25 March 1993	26	Thursdays at 6:30pm	Oil rig (Kempton Park Pumping Station, London) (Note: This was the same set as used in the Red Dwarf episode 'Justice', and the final episode of the 1992 television series remake of The Tomorrow People, in which the main star Kristian Schmid was also a challenger on this series of GamesMaster.)	Diver – Sarah Whisker
3	9 September 1993	1 March 1994	26	Thursdays then Tuesdays at 6:30pm	First Half: Games Academy (Oxford Prison); Second Half: Team Championship (Clerkenwell House of Detention)	Caretaker – Richard Baynham
4	20 September 1994	14 January 1995	18	Tuesdays at 6:30pm	Hell (St Paul's Church, Dock Street, London)	Goblins – Mark Lyle, Rob Umm, Richard Wright, Natalie McCloskey, Elizabeth Hyde, Victoria Hyde and Tim Colman
5	21 September 1995	18 January 1996	18	Thursdays at 6:30pm	Heaven (Hewland International's TV studio in Brixton)	Angels – Helena Tepper and Tanya Kecskes
6	24 October 1996	27 February 1997	18	Thursdays at 6:00pm	Atlantis (St Paul's Church, Dock Street, London)	Mermaids – Theresa Tilley and Leigh-Ann Woodall
7	19 November 1997	3 February 1998	10	Wednesdays then Tuesdays at 6:00pm	Desert island (Hewland International's TV studio in Brixton)	Castaways – Helena Tepper and Leigh-Ann Woodall
8	21 November 2021 (E4's YouTube channel); 24 November 2021 (E4)	5 December 2021 (E4's YouTube channel); 8 December 2021 (E4)	3	Wednesdays at 10pm	Power station (Crossness Pumping Station, Abbey Wood, London)	Gatekeepers – Lucy Frier and Matt McNaughton

=== Series 1 – 1992 ===
- Episode 1 – John Fashanu – 7 January 1992
- Episode 2 – Gary Mason – 14 January 1992
- Episode 3 – Annabel Croft – 21 January 1992
- Episode 4 – Eric Bristow – 28 January 1992
- Episode 5 – Jimmy White, Archer Maclean and Ashley Paske – 4 February 1992
- Episode 6 – Pat and Mick – 11 February 1992
- Episode 7 – Wrestling - Featuring Kendo Nagasaki – 18 February 1992
- Episode 8 – Pat Cash and Emily Cash – 25 February 1992
- Episode 9 – Barry McGuigan – 3 March 1992
- Episode 10 – Emlyn Hughes – 10 March 1992

=== Series 2 – 1992/1993 ===
- Episode 1 – Tony Slattery – 1 October 1992
- Episode 2 – Frank Bruno – 8 October 1992
- Episode 3 – Vinnie Jones and Nick Pickard – 15 October 1992
- Episode 4 – Rory Underwood – 22 October 1992
- Episode 5 – Take That – 29 October 1992
- Episode 6 – Jim Duggan – 5 November 1992
- Episode 7 – Shadow and Jet from Gladiators – 12 November 1992
- Episode 8 – Kristian Schmid – 19 November 1992
- Episode 9 – John Parrott – 26 November 1992
- Episode 10 – Richard Norton – 3 December 1992
- Episode 11 – Johnny Herbert – 10 December 1992
- Episode 12 – Todd Carty – 17 December 1992
- Episode 13 – Bob Holness – 24 December 1992
- Episode 14 – Linford Christie and Colin Jackson – 31 December 1992
- Episode 15 – Ian Wright – 7 January 1993
- Episode 16 – Mark Wingett and Huw Higginson – 14 January 1993
- Episode 17 – Cathy Dennis – 21 January 1993
- Episode 18 – Ulrika Jonsson – 28 January 1993
- Episode 19 – Vic Reeves – 4 February 1993
- Episode 20 – Gordon Burns – 11 February 1993
- Episode 21 – East 17 – 18 February 1993
- Episode 22 – Josie Lawrence – 25 February 1993
- Episode 23 – Tony Daley – 4 March 1993
- Episode 24 – Steve Backley – 11 March 1993
- Episode 25 – Duncan Goodhew and Arm wrestlers – 18 March 1993
- Episode 26 – Kevin Conway and Sean Kerly – 25 March 1993

=== Series 3 – 1993/1994 ===
- Episode 1 – Mortal Kombat (which featured both Daniel Pesina and Elizabeth Malecki who were both dressed as their respective characters, Johnny Cage and Sonya Blade). – 9 September 1993
- Episode 2 – Gabrielle – 16 September 1993
- Episode 3 – Gladiators 1 (Shadow and Falcon) – 23 September 1993
- Episode 4 – Gladiators 2 (Cobra and Scorpio) – 30 September 1993
- Episode 5 – Gladiators Final (Shadow and Scorpio) – 7 October 1993
- Episode 6 – Utah Saints – 14 October 1993
- Episode 7 – Steve Punt and Hugh Dennis – 21 October 1993
- Episode 8 – Sean Maguire – 28 October 1993
- Episode 9 – Monie Love (a trailer featuring Paul Whitehouse was shown for this episode, but his appearance was never broadcast) – 4 November 1993
- Episode 10 – Nigel Benn and Barry McGuigan (live episode) – 11 November 1993
- Episode 11 – Dani Behr – 18 November 1993
- Episode 12 – Liam Botham – 25 November 1993
- Episode 13 – Footy 1 Vinnie Jones vs. Les Ferdinand – 2 December 1993
- Episode 14 – Footy 2 Dennis Wise vs. John Barnes – 9 December 1993
- Episode 15 – Footy 3 Vinnie Jones vs. John Barnes plus a young Simon Amstell – 16 December 1993
- Episode 16 – Christmas Special with Frank Bruno, Mike Doyle, Lorraine Chase, John Altman, Robin Askwith, Wayne Morris, Robert Duncan, Graham Bickley and Ray Meagher – 23 December 1993
- Episode 17 – Games Mistress – 28 December 1993
- Episode 18 – Simone Robertson – 4 January 1994
- Episode 19 – Kriss Akabusi – 11 January 1994
- Episode 20 – Andrew Paul and Lisa Geoghan from The Bill – 18 January 1994
- Episode 21 – Ronnie O'Sullivan – 25 January 1994
- Episode 22 – Randy Savage – 1 February 1994
- Episode 23 – 2 Unlimited (Kevin Keegan guested in the Consoletation Zone) – 8 February 1994
- Episode 24 – Crash Test Dummies – 15 February 1994
- Episode 25 – Bad Boys Inc – 22 February 1994
- Episode 26 – GamesMaster Team Championship Final – 1 March 1994

=== Series 4 – 1994/1995 ===
- Episode 1 – Frank Skinner (with Richard Divizio as Baraka from Mortal Kombat II) – 20 September 1994
- Episode 2 – Bruce Roberts, Dan Falzon and Sarah Vandenbergh – 27 September 1994
- Episode 3 – Jimmy White – 4 October 1994
- Episode 4 – PJ & Duncan – 11 October 1994
- Episode 5 – Andy Cole vs. Kasey Keller – 18 October 1994
- Episode 6 – Vinnie Jones vs. Andy Townsend – 25 October 1994
- Episode 7 – Kasey Keller vs. Andy Townsend – 1 November 1994
- Episode 8 – Ian Kelsey vs. Camilla Power "Emmerdale stars" – 8 November 1994
- Episode 9 – Rupert Moon and Dewi Morris – 15 November 1994
- Episode 10 – Let Loose – 22 November 1994
- Episode 11 – C.J. Lewis – 29 November 1994
- Episode 12 – Marcus Alexander Bagwell and Del Wilkes – 6 December 1994
- Episode 13 – David Coulthard – 13 December 1994
- Episode 14 – Christmas 'Stars' Special – 20 December 1994
- Episode 15 – Roger Black and Du'aine Ladejo (shown at 5.35pm) – 27 December 1994
- Episode 16 – Prince Naseem – 3 January 1995
- Episode 17 – Natalie Imbruglia – 10 January 1995
- Episode 18 – Gore Special (shown at 12:35am) – 14 January 1995

=== Series 5 – 1995/1996 ===
- Episode 1 – The Shamen – 21 September 1995
- Episode 2 – Jadene Doran – 28 September 1995
- Episode 3 – Stephen Hendry – 3 October 1995
- Episode 4 – Donna Air and Vicky Taylor from Byker Grove – 12 October 1995
- Episode 5 – Stuart Wade and Tonicha Jeronimo from Emmerdale – 19 October 1995
- Episode 6 – Dean Holdsworth and David Kerslake – 26 October 1995
- Episode 7 – Phil Babb and Graeme Le Saux – 7 November 1995
- Episode 8 – Dean Holdsworth and Phil Babb – 9 November 1995
- Episode 9 – Johnny Herbert and Mark Blundell – 16 November 1995
- Episode 10 – Cobra and Panther from Gladiators – 23 November 1995
- Episode 11 – Ronnie O'Sullivan – 30 November 1995
- Episode 12 – E.Y.C. – 7 December 1995
- Episode 13 – Whigfield – 14 December 1995
- Episode 14 – Patsy Palmer and Dean Gaffney from EastEnders – 21 December 1995
- Episode 15 – Christmas Special - highlights from previous series – 28 December 1995
- Episode 16 – Mr Motivator – 4 January 1996
- Episode 17 – Stewart Lee and Richard Herring – 11 January 1996
- Episode 18 – Janick Gers – 18 January 1996

=== Series 6 – 1996/1997 ===
- Episode 1 – Samantha Fox – 24 October 1996
- Episode 2 – Danny John-Jules – 31 October 1996
- Episode 3 – John Regis and Tony Jarrett – 7 November 1996
- Episode 4 – Paul Leyshon – 14 November 1996
- Episode 5 – Uri Geller – 21 November 1996
- Episode 6 – Richard Rufus and Michael Duberry – 28 November 1996
- Episode 7 – Chris Armstrong – 5 December 1996
- Episode 8 – Richard Rufus and Chris Armstrong – 12 December 1996
- Episode 9 – Christmas Special - The Gamesmaster Christmas Quiz – 19 December 1996
- Episode 10 – Zoë Ball – 2 January 1997
- Episode 11 – Deepak Verma – 9 January 1997
- Episode 12 – Bear Van Beers (Beertje Van Beers) – 16 January 1997
- Episode 13 – Tracy Shaw – 23 January 1997
- Episode 14 – Adam Hollioake and Phil Tufnell – 30 January 1997
- Episode 15 – Paul McKenna – 6 February 1997
- Episode 16 – The Brotherhood (band) – 13 February 1997
- Episode 17 – Gene (band) – 20 February 1997
- Episode 18 – Michael Fish – 27 February 1997

=== Series 7 – 1997/1998 ===
- Episode 1 – Jo Guest – 19 November 1997
- Episode 2 – Kaleef – 26 November 1997
- Episode 3 – Boxers Ryan Rhodes and Khalid Shafiq – 3 December 1997
- Episode 4 – Sol Campbell and Christian Dailly – 10 December 1997
- Episode 5 – Emma Harrison (Christmas special) – 17 December 1997
- Episode 6 – All Saints – 6 January 1998
- Episode 7 – Sarah Vandenbergh and Carryl Varley – 13 January 1998
- Episode 8 – Catalina Guirado – 20 January 1998
- Episode 9 – Debbie Flett and Emma Noble – 27 January 1998
- Episode 10 – Compilation look-back show (the final episode) – 3 February 1998

=== Series 8 – 2021 ===
- Episode 1 – Snoochie Shy – 21 November 2021 (E4's YouTube channel) and 24 November 2021 (E4)
- Episode 2 – Warren Brown – 28 November 2021 (E4's YouTube channel) and 1 December 2021 (E4)
- Episode 3 – Elz The Witch, Dev Griffin – 5 December 2021 (E4's YouTube channel) and 8 December 2021 (E4)
