= Games Republic =

TV show

Games Republic is a thirty-minute TV game show which was broadcast on BSkyB's .tv channel from 1999 to 2000. It had an Egyptian theme and was hosted by Trevor and Simon.

The first round consisted of the 'punch up quiz' in which two contestants battled against each other to get a chance at playing a bronze, silver or gold challenge. If the contestant won the bronze challenge then on the next show, the contestant would get a chance to play a silver challenge and the same for the gold challenge. For the challenges, a character called 'the Pundit' (a hooded Charlie Brooker) was brought on to give advice to the contestant and to inform the viewers about the game.

The show was criticised by contestants for the lack of research into its questions. Contestants often questioned the presenters on air regarding answers which were in fact correct but were still given as false.
