= Swraj Paul, Baron Paul =

British business magnate (1931–2025)

The Right Honourable The Lord Paul PC
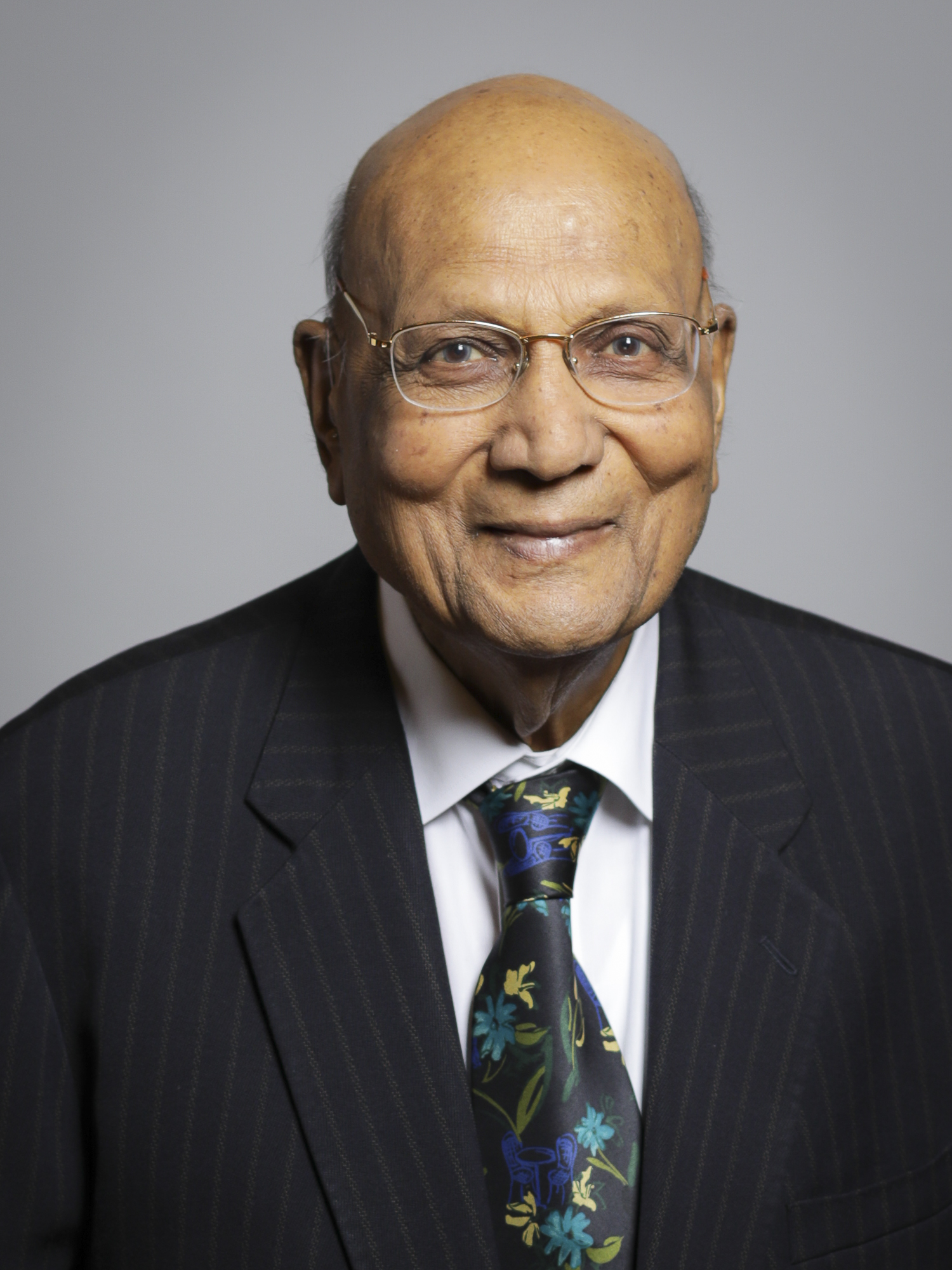
- Official portrait, 2019
- Born: Swraj Paul; 18 February 1931; Jullundur, Punjab Province, British India
- Died: 21 August 2025 (aged 94); London, England
- Citizenship: United Kingdom
- Education: Doaba College; Forman Christian College; Massachusetts Institute of Technology
- Occupations: Business magnate; philanthropist
- Political party: Labour (1996–2010)
- Children: 4, including Angad

Member of the House of Lords
- Lord Temporal
- Life peerage 9 October 1996 – 21 August 2025

Swraj Paul, Baron Paul, PC (18 February 1931 – 21 August 2025) was an Indian-born British business magnate and philanthropist. In 1996 he was appointed a Labour life peer under Conservative prime minister John Major, and sat in the House of Lords as a non-affiliated peer with the title Baron Paul, of Marylebone, in the City of Westminster. In December 2008 he was appointed deputy speaker of the Lords; in October 2009 he was appointed to the Privy Council.

== Early life and education ==
According to his official biography, Swraj Paul was born in Jullundur, Punjab Province, in 1931, in what was then British India. His father Payare Lal ran a small foundry, making steel buckets and farming equipment. His mother's name was Mongwati. The site of his childhood home is now Apeejay School.

Swraj Paul completed his high school education at Labbu Ram Doaba School. Paul was educated at Forman Christian College in Lahore, and Doaba College in Jalandhar. He went to the United States to study mechanical engineering, obtaining BSc, MSc and MechE degrees from the Massachusetts Institute of Technology.

== Business career ==
After leaving MIT, he returned to India to work for the family business, Apeejay Group, which was founded by his father, and was, at the time, managed by his two older brothers, Satya Paul and Jit Paul.

=== Caparo Group ===
In 1966 he relocated to the United Kingdom to obtain medical treatment for his young daughter, who had leukaemia. He spent a year grieving her death, after which he founded Natural Gas Tubes. Starting with one steel unit, he went on to acquire more. This led to his founding the Caparo Group in 1968, which became one of the UK's largest steel conversion and distribution businesses, manufacturing an extensive range of structural steels, precision tube, spirally welded tube, special bar qualities, industrial wires, cold rolled strip and spring steel strip. Lord Paul stepped down from the management of the Caparo Group in 1996.

Up until Autumn 2015, Caparo employed over 10,000 people across North America, Europe, India and, the Middle East. In October 2015, 16 of the 20 limited companies that formed most of Caparo Group UK collapsed into administration, and on 8 November his son Angad Paul, the Group's CEO, died in an apparently suicidal fall from his eighth-floor penthouse flat.

== Public role and philanthropy ==
Lord Paul held many public positions. In 2006, as part of his parliamentary work, he made a declaration of interest; he was involved with more than a dozen organisations outside his family business and foundation. This foundation, named in memory of his daughter, channels profits from Caparo India into charitable endeavours. For example, Paul was an honorary patron of the Zoological Society of London and funded major projects at the Regent's Park site, including the Ambika Paul children's zoo.

In 2020, $5 million was donated to the Massachusetts Institute of Technology for "The Swraj Paul Theatre" at the Kresge Auditorium.

=== Education ===
The Foundation has established the Ambika Paul School of Technology in Jalandhar, India.

Lord Paul held the Pro-Chancellorship of Thames Valley University from 1997 to 2000, and the Chancellorship from 2000 to 2001.

He was the Chancellor of the University of Wolverhampton from 1998 until his death in 2025. In 2010 the student union centre was renamed "The Ambika Paul Student Union Centre", following his donation towards its refurbishment. In 2015 he gave, through his family foundation, £1 million, the largest single donation in the university's history.

Lord Paul was Chancellor of University of Westminster, from 2006 to 2014; his foundation donated £300,000 to establish the Ambika P3 event and exhibition space.

He sat on MIT's Mechanical Engineering Visiting Committee between 1998 and 2001, when he established the Ambika Paul Mezzanine and Study Space, and the Swraj Paul Scholarship fund for undergraduate and graduate students.

Lord Paul was a member of the President's Cabinet for Chapman University in Orange, California.

=== International relations ===
Lord Paul took an interest in international relations. He was appointed by the government to act as an ambassador for British business from 1998–2010. He was a member of the Foreign Policy Centre Advisory Council. He contested for the chairmanship of the Commonwealth Parliamentary Association, with an agenda to reduce the gap between the West and the East. Lord Paul was Co-Chairman of the Indo-British Roundtable from 2000 to 2005. He was a member of Panel 2000, an appointment by the Prime Minister to re-brand Britain.

=== British politics ===
Lord Paul donated £500,000 to the Labour Party, being the largest donor to Gordon Brown's leadership campaign and offering in 2007 to give "as much as [he] can afford" in the case of an early election. He was also close to the former UK Prime Minister's wife, Sarah Brown, for whom he showed paternal concern. Lord Paul was chairman and trustee of Theirworld and chairman Theirworld Projects Ltd (formerly PiggyBankKids) from 2002 to 2015; the charity was founded by Sarah Brown.

He was the first person of Indian origin to hold the post of deputy speaker of the House of Lords, one of twelve people in that post. He was sworn of the Privy Council on 15 October 2009.

Lord Paul was involved with the London Olympics from its inception; he was a member of the board responsible for the 2005 submission of the bid for the 2012 Summer Olympics. He travelled to Singapore as part of the bidding team that successfully persuaded the International Olympic Committee to award the games to London for 2012. He chaired the Olympic Delivery Committee, part of the London Development Agency, with the job of obtaining the land on which to build the new venues, and delivering the land on time and on budget. (See Legacy of the 2012 Summer Olympics.)

== Controversy ==
In October 2009, The Sunday Times reported that Lord Paul had been unable to satisfactorily explain claiming expenses of £38,000 for the period January 2005 to July 2006. Lord Paul immediately requested the Clerk of the Parliaments to investigate his expenses at the same time repaying £41,982, instead of £26,988, £15,000, more than the House of Lords would have requested at the conclusion of their investigation. A refund of the difference was never issued by the House of Lords. The Metropolitan Police opened an investigation concerning these expense claims, but by the end of February 2010 concluded there was no case. Lord Paul appeared before various committees for Lord's Conduct with ultimately the Privileges Committee concluding that Lord Paul had not acted dishonestly or in bad faith. They did determine however that he had been negligent and acted in ignorance and that his actions did render him liable to sanction by the House." Lord Paul's suspension was for four months. Lord Paul completely disagreed with their finding, calling it "unreasonable." Lord Paul gave a Speech in the House of Lords in June 2011 calling for reform and revision of the structure of the constitution.

Paul tendered his resignation as Deputy Speaker to the Lord Speaker on 1 November 2010. His letter, printed in The House Magazine a week later, expressed his reservations about the process, calling it "a sad saga for parliamentary democracy – an unfortunate series of events having evidently been inspired by the electoral politics of the media". He spoke on this topic many times after the expenses scandal initially made news, and maintained that no wrongdoing had occurred in his case.

During the period between the 2019 and 2024 general elections, he claimed £100,946 in allowances; this was despite the fact that he "did not speak, write or hold a committee or government post, and voted only once".

== Personal life and death ==
Lord Paul was on the Sunday Times Rich List as the 38th richest person in Britain, although he claimed to take public transport in London "like everybody else". From the 1960s he lived in Portland Place, in central London. He and his family owned a dozen flats in the block, each worth close to £1,000,000.

His son Angad Paul, CEO of Caparo plc, died after falling from his Marylebone penthouse flat on 8 November 2015. A police statement stated they considered there to be no suspicious circumstances.

Lord Paul died in London on 21 August 2025, at the age of 94.

Coat of arms of Swraj Paul, Baron Paul
| Crest Issuing from a lotus or a girl child proper vested azure holding aloft in the dexter hand a dove wings elevated argent. Escutcheon Azure on each of three piles rayonny or, one issuing from the dexter and two from the sinister, a pile gules. Supporters On either side an Indian elephant azure tusked unguled and grasping with the trunk a torch enflamed or. Motto Truth, Freedom And Compassion |

== Awards and honours ==
Lord Paul received various awards and honours including 15 honorary degrees from universities in the UK, US, India, Russia and Switzerland. In 1983 he was awarded the Padma Bhushan, by Indira Gandhi, the Prime Minister of India, and the Bharat Gaurav award by the Indian Merchants' Chamber. Freedom of the City of London, 1998; Asian Business Awards, Lifetime Achievement Award, 2008; Donald C. Burnham Manufacturing Management Award, Society of Manufacturing Engineers, USA, 1995; First Asian of the Year Award, Asian Who's Who, 1987; Asian Woman Magazine Lifetime Achievement Award, 2008. PowerBrands Hall of Fame nominated him Global Indian of the Year, 2011. Massachusetts Institute of Technology, Corporate Leadership Award, 1989.

He was awarded "International Indian of Decade" for his outstanding achievements in the fields of industry, education and philanthropy at the 20th anniversary of the publication of India Link International, a monthly magazine in November 2013.

In 2014, Lord Paul was presented with a Lifetime Achievement Award by the Black Country Asian Business Association for his "outstanding achievements in the fields of industry, education and philanthropy". In 2014, he received a further Lifetime Achievement Award in recognition of his work in promoting India-UK educational ties from the Global Skill Tree consortium, an India Based think tank, which hopes to promote India as a global hub of international education through its "Great Place to Study – India" initiative.

In July 2014, Lord Paul was given the "International Icon of the Decade Award" by the World Consulting Research Corporation at its Global Indian Excellence Summit in London, in recognition of "his outstanding achievements in the fields of manufacturing, education and philanthropy".

In April 2018, Lord Paul received two awards during a trip to India: the IOD Golden Peacock Award For Lifetime Achievement in Business Leadership and the Global Punjabi Society Lifetime Achievement Award.

In May 2018, Lord Paul was given the Int+ WCRC International Iconic Leader Award for Lifetime Achievement, at the UK & Asia Business Awards ceremony in London.

In October 2018, he was awarded the Mahatma Gandhi Honour by the NRI Institute in celebration of their 30th anniversary.

In June 2019, he was awarded an honorary Fellowship by the Zoological Society of London.

In August 2020, Lord and Lady Paul were invited to become members of the MIT Charter Society in recognition of their philanthropic commitment to MIT.

In November 2024, Lord Paul received top honour at Asian Business Awards Hosted by the Asian Media Group.

== Publications ==
- Beyond Boundaries: A Memoir, Penguin Books, 1998, ISBN 9780140272291
- Indira Gandhi, Heron Press, 1984 – a biography of Indira Gandhi, ISBN 9780947728182
