= Caparo T1 =

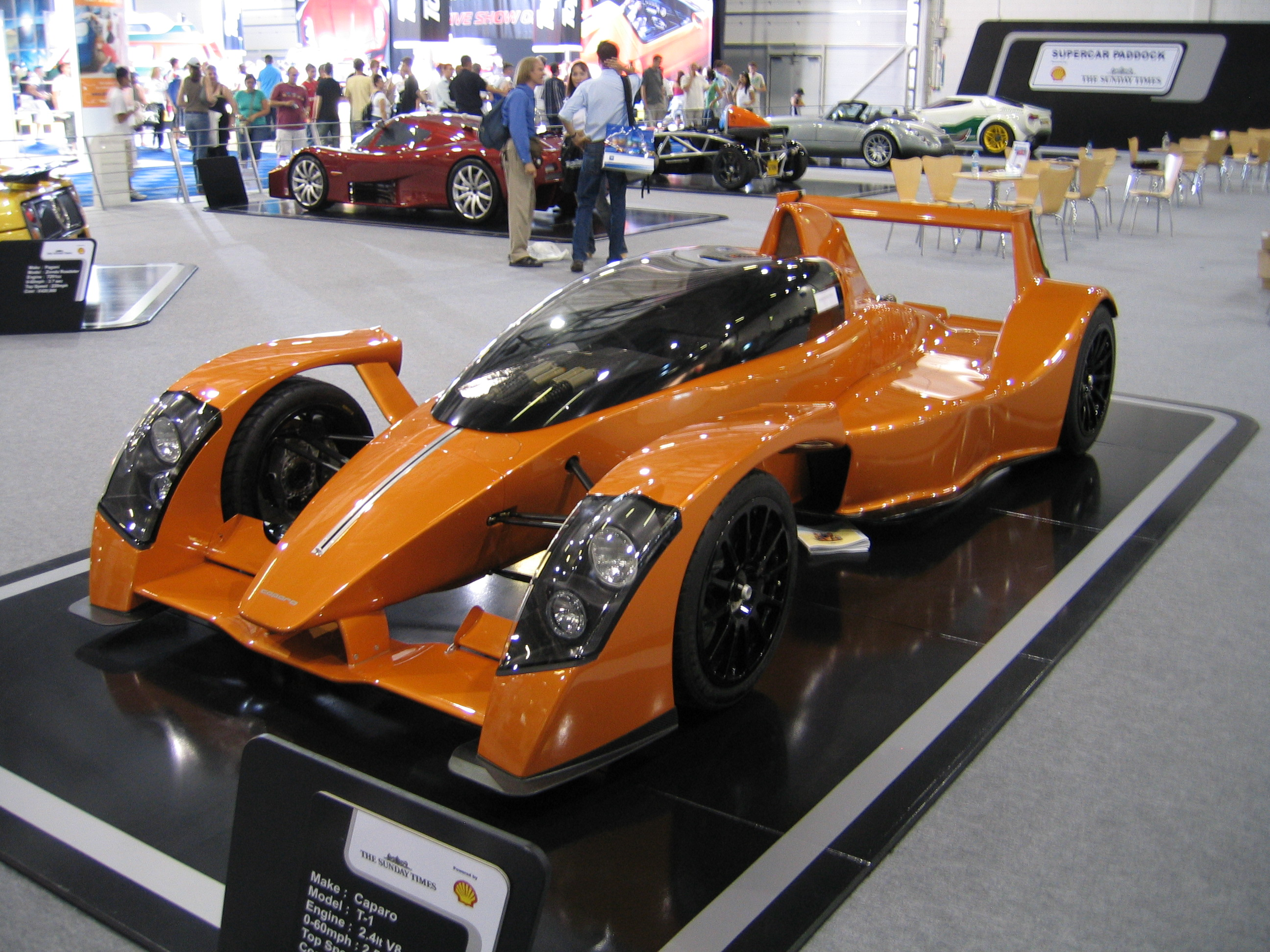

Overview
- Manufacturer: Caparo Vehicle Technologies
- Also called: Freestream T1 (formerly)
- Assembly: Basingstoke, Hampshire
- Designer: Ben Scott-Geddes

Body and chassis
- Class: Sports car (S)
- Body style: 1-door coupé
- Layout: Mid-engine, rear-wheel drive

Powertrain
- Engine: 3,496 cc (3.5 L) Nissan/Menard IndyCar V8
- Power output: 575 horsepower (429 kW; 583 PS)
- Transmission: Hewland 6-speed sequential manual

Dimensions
- Wheelbase: 2,900 mm (114.2 in)
- Length: 4,066 mm (160.1 in)
- Width: 1,990 mm (78.3 in)
- Height: 1,076 mm (42.4 in)
- Kerb weight: 470 kg (1,036 lb)

The Caparo T1 is a British mid-engine, rear-wheel drive, two-seat automobile that was built by Caparo Vehicle Technologies, founded by design director Ben Scott-Geddes, engineering director Graham Halstead, engineers formerly involved in the development of the McLaren F1 and Sean Butcher, marketing director and financier. The T1 was inspired by Formula One design, and intended as a relatively affordable road legal racing car. The T1 was scheduled for production in mid-2007 for a price of £235,000 with approximately 25 cars per year built.

== Overview ==
The T1 has a dry weight of 470 kilograms (1,040 lb), an overall length of 4,066 millimetres (160.1 in), an overall width of 1,990 millimetres (78 in), an overall height of 1,076 millimetres (42.4 in), and a wheelbase of 2,900 millimetres (110 in). It has a fuel tank capacity of 70 liters (18 U.S. gal).

=== Exterior ===
The exterior of the T1 closely resembles that of a racing prototype or Formula One racing car. It features a carbon fibre aerodynamic low drag body design, composed of individual sections, with an adjustable twin element front wing, single element rear wing, adjustable flaps, and a ground effect diffuser, allowing it to create 875 kilograms (1,929 lb) of downforce at 240 kilometres per hour (149 mph). The wings are replaceable with road and track variations.

=== Interior ===
The interior of the T1 is a two-seat configuration, lacking any amenities and luxuries to reduce excess weight. The passenger's seat is set back from the driver's seat slightly, allowing the seats to be placed closer together, thereby reducing the overall width of the T1. Offered are a head protection system, six-point harnesses for the driver and passenger, compatible with a HANS device, and is designed with a central safety cell made of a high-strength steel roll hoop with a fire system. The dashboard is multi-function with race data logging and speed sensors for traction control and launch control.

=== Chassis ===
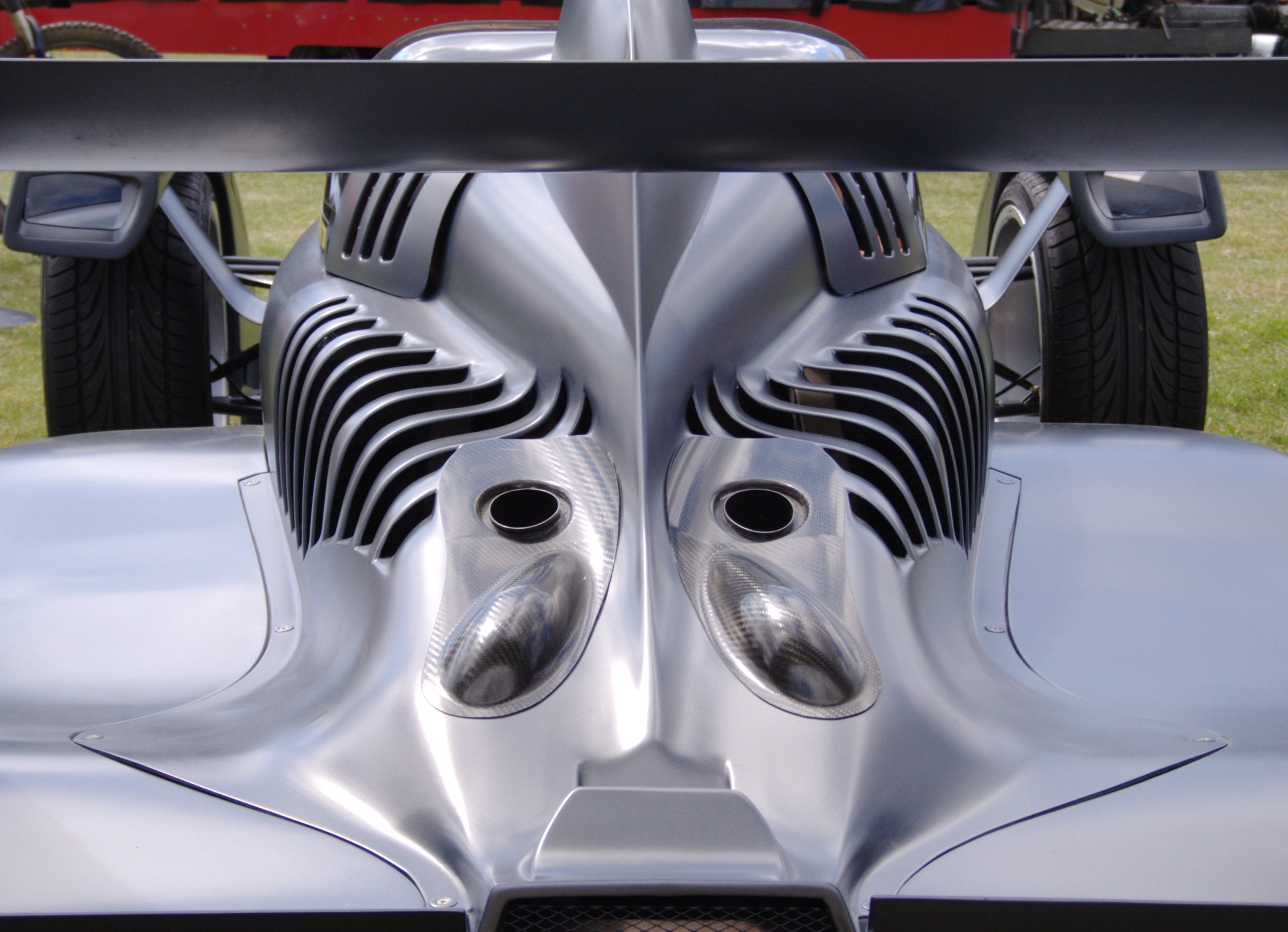
The Caparo T1's tailpipes and louvers along the F1-style body.

The chassis of the T1 is composed of a carbon fibre and aluminium honeycomb monocoque with a front composite crash structure and a rear tubular space frame construction. The suspension is of a double wishbone design with tunable anti-roll bars, front and rear, and five-way adjustable race dampers. The braking system is composed of 355-millimetre (14.0 in) metal brake discs, with six-piston and four-piston callipers front and rear, respectively. The brake bias pedal box is fully adjustable and brake pads are available in various compounds. The wheels are all-aluminium 10-by-18-inch (250 by 460 mm) and 11-by-19-inch (280 by 480 mm) front and rear, respectively, with Pirelli P Zero Corsa tyres. Magnesium 10-by-18-inch (250 by 460 mm) and 11-by-18-inch (280 by 460 mm) wheels front and rear, respectively, with Pirelli slick and wet track tyres are available as optional equipment.

=== Powertrain ===
The T1 sports a 116-kilogram (256 lb), 32-valve, 3,496-cubic-centimetre (3.5 L), all-aluminium, naturally-aspirated, Menard V8, with cylinder banks mounted at 90°, and lubricated via a dry-sump oil system. The engine has gone through several designs, previously including a smaller 2.4-litre supercharged unit. The production design generates a maximum power of 575 horsepower (429 kW; 583 PS) at 10,500 revolutions per minute and a maximum torque of 310 pound-feet (420 N⋅m) at 9,000 revolutions per minute, giving the car a power-to-weight ratio of 1,223 horsepower per tonne (912.8 kW/t). In addition, the engine has been reported to successfully reach 700 horsepower (522 kW; 710 PS) on methanol fuel. The engine is controlled via a fully tunable Pectel SQ6 engine control unit and the throttle is controlled via a throttle-by-wire system.

The T1's gearbox is a 6-speed Hewland sequential, made of a magnesium and carbon construction, that has a variety of available gear ratios, and utilizes a pneumatic actuator to shift; able to upshift in 60 milliseconds and downshift in 30 milliseconds. Furthermore, the drivetrain incorporates a limited-slip differential and equal-length hollow tripod driveshafts.

=== Performance ===
The T1 has an estimated maximum speed of 205 miles per hour (330 km/h) on a low downforce setup. From a standing start, it has an estimated 0–100 kilometres per hour (0–62 mph) time under 2.5 seconds and onto 160 kilometres per hour (99 mph) in 4.9 seconds, depending on tyre setup. It is also capable of an estimated lateral acceleration of up to 3 g and braking deceleration of 3 g, depending on tyre setup.

== History ==
=== Unveiling ===
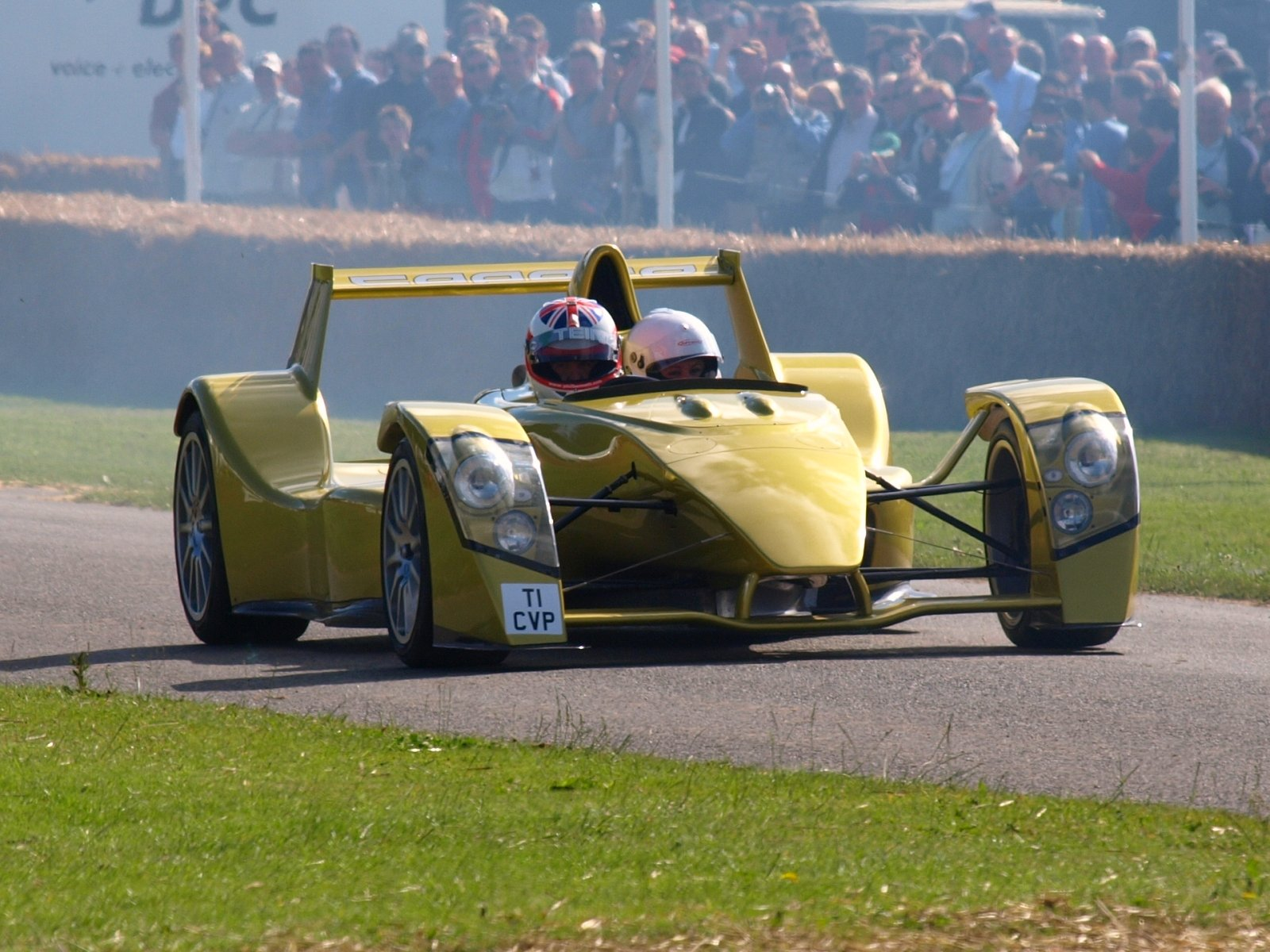
A Caparo T1 at the 2008 Goodwood Festival of Speed.

The T1 was officially unveiled by Albert II, Prince of Monaco, joined by Murray Walker, at the Top Marques auto show in Monaco on 20 April 2006. The show car unveiled was a prototype, painted orange as historic McLaren cars were due to the nature of the T1's designers being ex-McLaren engineers. Another test vehicle was reported to have been under construction at the time.

During the MPH '07 auto show, on 30 October through 2 November and later 13 November through 16 November 2007, Caparo, in conjunction with the London Metropolitan Police, unveiled a prototype police vehicle variant of the T1 named the Rapid Response Vehicle (RRV). However, Top Gear and Edmunds reported that the car would not be put into production.

=== Incidents ===
Jason Plato was injured in a prototype T1 in October 2007 at the Bruntingthorpe proving ground when it caught fire at an estimated 250 kilometres per hour (160 mph). The T1 was being tested during filming for Five's Fifth Gear. Plato described what happened as:

There was a slight loss of power, I looked in the mirror and saw some smoke, there was a slight smell of oil and then suddenly there was this intense heat. The car spontaneously erupted into a ball of flame and I was sat in the middle of a fireball. I hit the brakes, brought the car to a stop as quickly as I could and jumped out.

In the associated episode of Fifth Gear, first broadcast 15 October 2007, presenter Vicki Butler-Henderson suggested the fire was caused by a "faulty oil sealing component," which, having been identified, has been fully rectified by Caparo.

While being tested for competing for British television programme Top Gear, first broadcast on 11 November 2007, a floor panel came loose from the test vehicle as it was being driven at speed by Jeremy Clarkson, after he had already made a play of being scared about driving the car because of Plato's experience. Afterwards, there was a problem with the car's petrol injection system. In the same review, Clarkson mentioned two more incidents, one at the press launch, when "some aspect of the front suspension came adrift" while a Dutch journalist was driving, causing him to veer off-road, and one at the Goodwood Festival of Speed when the throttle stuck open.

=== Reviews ===
On 11 November 2007, the T1 surpassed the Top Gear Power Board leader's time of 1:17.6, then held by the Koenigsegg CCX, with a time of 1:10.6. Immediately after having declared the time and placed it on the Power Board, presenter Jeremy Clarkson removed the record because it did not meet the show's rule that the car must be able to go over a speed bump. However, Ben Scott-Geddes of Caparo has stated that, "the model we supplied to Top Gear was one of our final engineering vehicles without adjustable ride height and electronic active driver control systems which are standard on our production models. When drivers select the 'road' setting, the car is more tractable in slower speed conditions and the ride height is fully adjustable to bring the car up to 90 mm clearance, making it more than capable of driving over speed bumps."

When driving the Caparo, Clarkson had stated that limited aerodynamic downforce is created at slow speeds, saying that it would be an excellent excuse for a policeman since "[he] has to take that corner at a thousand mph because if [he] takes it at thirty, [he'll] crash." The car had low levels of lateral traction while cornering if it was not being driven rapidly. Aerodynamically, this vehicle is designed such that air passing over the body at high speed "pushes" the vehicle against the road (allowing for higher cornering speeds). He criticized the handling characteristics, finding that the vehicle was difficult to control around corners at low speeds and that on a wet or cold day (these factors negatively affect grip) there were problems even at higher speeds.

=== Sales ===
Caparo planned to sell around 25 cars per year. However, in the production run they sold just 15 cars before the company fell into administration in 2015, with the completed cars and owners locations unknown. A small number of T1s have appeared for sale following the company's collapse, one in Japan in 2019, and a further two that have been on sale in the United Kingdom since 2021.
