= Gamer.tv =

British television series

- The Gamer.tv logo
- Created by: IMG
- Starring: Sam Delaney
- Country of origin: United Kingdom
- No. of episodes: 283

Production
- Running time: 30 minutes (including advertisements)

Original release
- Network: Bravo (United Kingdom), Starz (USA), TEN Sports (India), Now TV (Hong Kong)
- Release: December 2002 – 26 April 2008

Gamer.tv is a weekly television program produced by the company of the same name and owned by IMG, that ran from 2002 to 2008. Each half-hour episode mixed topical video game news, reviews, previews and features. The series aired on a number of networks around the world including Bravo in the United Kingdom and Starz in North America. It was also shown in Canada, South America, Spain, India, and New Zealand, and video segments appeared on a number of websites, as well, including MSN. The show was banned in China.

== History ==
The first episode aired in December 2002. In October 2005, the UK edition briefly changed name to "Gamer TV: Next Gen" for 12 episodes that featured host Sam Delaney on screen. In January 2006, they reverted to its traditional name and Sam Delaney's narration. On 14 September 2007, the series celebrated its 250th episode. On the 25 November 2007 episode, Gamer.tv changed its scoring system from out of 5, to out of 10.

Gamer.tv concluded in the UK on 26 April 2008 with its 283rd episode. Bravo replaced it with Playr on 3 May 2008.

Between May 2006 and February 2008, it aired in the United States on Starz narrated by Christian Stevenson, with occasional segments from the UK programme.

It was aired in India and in various parts of Asia through TEN Sports, during its original run and with one-week tape delay.

In the UK, it spawned two spin-offs, which also aired on Bravo. The first was "Gamer's Guide to..." and then a different subtitle each week, such as Gamer's Guide to PS3 Games and Gamer's Guide to Wii Games, which showcased all the reviews from previous Gamer.tv shows in a compilation of must own video games. The second was Gamer.tv Extra which included the production team revealing more on the games featured in that week's episode of Gamer.tv as well as some games exclusive to Extra.

The series has also appeared on the American television network GSN under their GSN Video Games block, paired with another Gamer.tv program, Game Sauce; and G4. Segments from this program were re-vamped and added to a show in Nickelodeon Games and Sports called Play 2Z.
