= Angad Paul =

British businessman and film producer

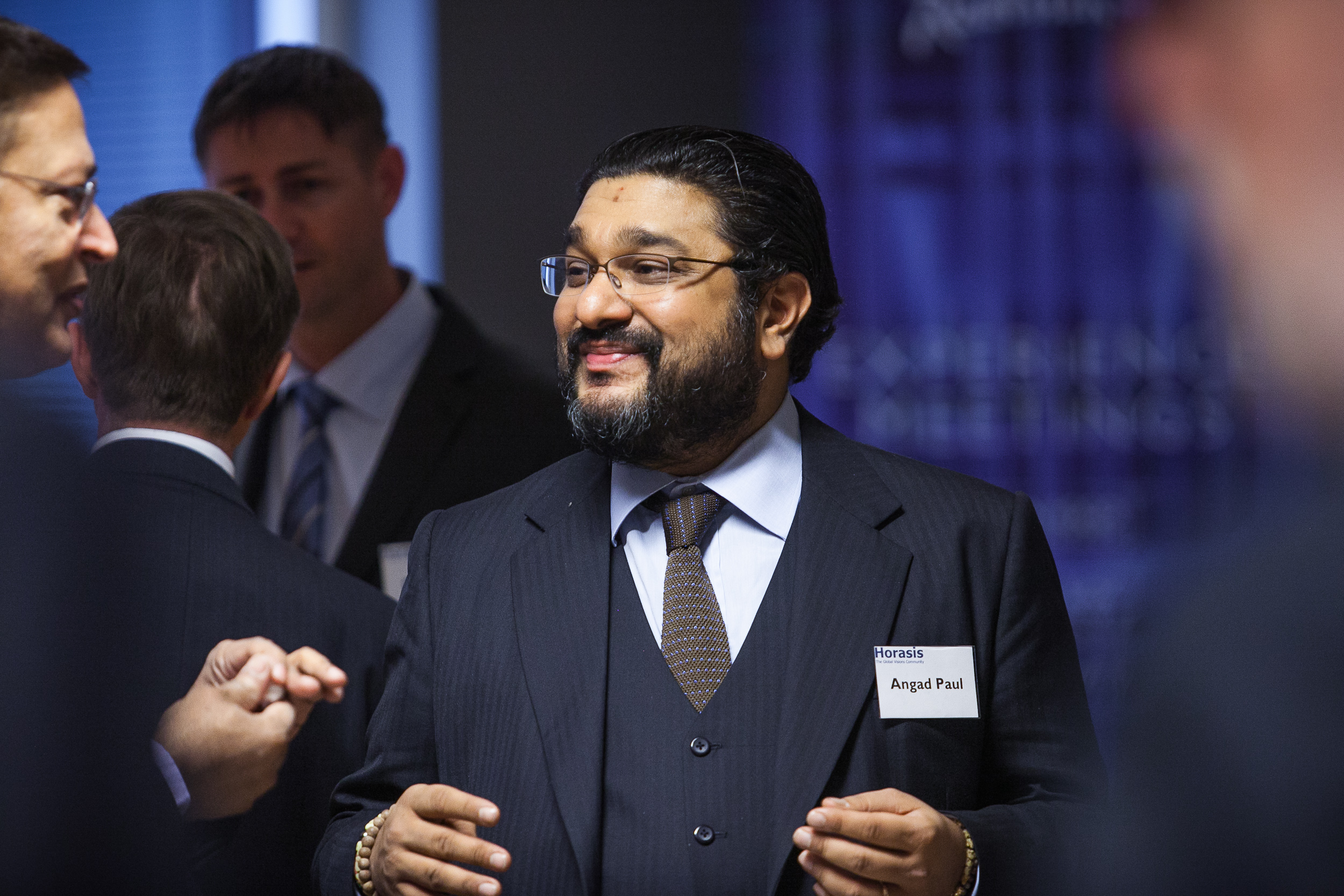
- Paul in 2013
- Born: 6 June 1970; London, England
- Died: 8 November 2015 (aged 45); London, England
- Education: Massachusetts Institute of Technology
- Occupations: CEO, Caparo plc
- Spouse: Michelle Bonn
- Children: 2
- Father: Swraj Paul, Baron Paul

Angad Paul (6 June 1970 – 8 November 2015) was a British businessman and film producer.

== Early life ==
Paul was born on 6 June 1970, the youngest son of the billionaire entrepreneur and politician Swraj Paul, Baron Paul. He attended Harrow School and received a degree in economics from the Massachusetts Institute of Technology.

== Career ==
He was CEO of Caparo Industries, having taken over from his father in 1996. He was also a film producer, with credits including Lock, Stock and Two Smoking Barrels (1998), Snatch (2000), and The Tournament (2009).

== Personal life ==
In March 2005, Paul married media lawyer Michelle Bonn in a ceremony held at Lancaster House. They had two children.

== Death ==
Paul died by suicide on 8 November 2015, jumping from his penthouse home, an eight-storey building in Portland Place, central London. The police stated that there were no suspicious circumstances, and the coroner recorded that he had been "suffering from severe agitated depression".

Nearly three years after Paul's death, the Angad Arts Hotel, named after him, opened in St. Louis, United States.

The 2015 film Eddie the Eagle was dedicated to Paul. The movie was directed by Dexter Fletcher and produced by Matthew Vaughn, who were part of the team that worked with Paul when he produced Lock, Stock and Two Smoking Barrels in 1998.
