= .tv (TV channel) =

Former British television channel

- Country: United Kingdom

Ownership
- Owner: British Sky Broadcasting

History
- Launched: 1 September 1996
- Closed: 2 September 2001
- Replaced by: PremPlus
- Former names: The Computer Channel (1996–1998)

.tv (formerly The Computer Channel, pronounced as Dot TV and referred to on‑screen as .tv - the technology channel) was a British television channel dedicated to technology. .tv was owned and operated by British Sky Broadcasting. The channel was first broadcast as The Computer Channel and launched on 1 September 1996, broadcasting between 18:00 and 20:00. It timeshared with Granada Good Life when it launched a month later. The broadcasting hours were increased to 6 p.m.‍–‍10 p.m. when the channel started broadcasting on British Sky Broadcasting's digital satellite platform, Sky Digital in 1998, then midday–midnight the following year. In 1999, the channel interviewed then-Microsoft CEO Bill Gates.

Towards the end of its run, .tv implemented several new shows heavily sponsored by online technology store dabs.com, promoting products which were available at that site. .tv was closed on 2 September 2001 because of low audience ratings. Most of the programmes were produced by Prospect Pictures and Illumina.

== Programming ==
- Buyers Guide – A 20-minute weekday show that reviewed gadgets (such as PDAs and printers), computers and software (such as video games, operating systems and photo manipulation). Presented by Will Hanrahan. Guests included: Lydia Jones, Chris Long, and Ashley Jones.
- Chips with Everything – A 20-minute weekday show presented by Kate Russell with guests trying to answer computer-related questions that were sent in by viewers. Guests included: Roger Gann, James Morris, Simon Smart, Nigel Whitfield, Guy Clapperton, and Charles Bocock.
- Ex Machina – A 30-minute weekly show that went behind the scenes of digitally produced entertainment (video games, films and television programmes).
- Game Over (originally Games World) – A variable-format video game magazine show. The show was presented by Andy Collins and co-presented by Matt Berry, Richard Pitt, Helen Hartley & Kellie Priestley. In November 2000, Matt Cuttle took over as the sole presenter.
- Games Republic – A question-based video game quiz show, presented by Trevor and Simon.
- 404 Not Found – An offbeat news and reviews show with regular viewer letters and emails, written and hosted by Dave Green and Danny O'Brien, with additional script‑writing by James Wallis.
- Global Village – A 30-minute weekly show that looked at how technology was revolutionising our homes from an international perspective. Presented by Will Hanrahan.
- Masterclass – A 20-minute weekday show that gave tutorials on how to use features from programs like Microsoft Word, Adobe Photoshop and Nero Burning ROM. For the majority of the run, the show was presented by Richard Topping, affectionately known as "Toppers." He left the show to pursue a successful career in writing. His replacement was comedian Marc Haynes, who fronted the show until the channel closed.
- Nexus – A puzzle game show hosted by Brian Blessed.

Buyers Guide, Masterclass and Chips with Everything were repeated as omnibus editions (the weekday editions broadcast as one programme) on weekends.
