= Dave Perry =

English video game journalist and commentator

- Born: David Roy Perry; 21 May 1966 (age 60)
- Occupation: Tattoo Parlour owner

David Roy Perry (born 21 May 1966) is a British broadcaster who was co-commentator on the UK computer and video games television shows GamesMaster and Games World. Perry famously reacted poorly on GamesMaster after a contest involving Super Mario 64, which was unreleased in the UK at the time.

He was responsible for launching many games magazines, including Games World, Play, PowerStation, X-Gen, STATION and Mega Power. He has since opened a tattoo parlour named Revolver Tattoo Rooms.
