= Ben & Jason =

English singer-songwriter duo

Background information
- Origin: London, England
- Genres: Folk-pop, soft rock
- Years active: 1998–2003
- Labels: Go! Beat, Universal, Setanta
- Past members: Ben Parker; Jason Hazeley
- Website: Myspace

Ben & Jason were a singer-songwriter duo from London, England consisting of Ben Parker and Jason Hazeley. Formed in 1998, they released three albums on the Go! Beat/Universal labels: Hello, Emoticons and Ten Songs About You. When they were dropped from their major label deal, the band released their final album, Goodbye, on the independent label Setanta.

As songwriters-for-hire, they collaborated with Mundy and Martine McCutcheon.

Their single "Air Guitar", from the album Emoticons, reached No. 79 in the UK Singles Chart. AllMusic described Emoticons as an "impressive collection of elegantly crafted folk pop." Better known is their collaboration with Kinobe, "Slip into Something..." (from the album Soundphiles), which reached No. 78 in the UK. The pair went their separate ways in December 2003 after disappointing results but excellent reviews from the penultimate album Ten Songs About You, and in particular the single "The Wild Things".

Ben Parker went on to form the band Lux Luther in 2004 with bass player Ollie Russian, drummer Ben Carpenter (now of the Creepy Morons) and guitarist Gavin Slater (now of Ghosts). After varying success on the London gig circuit, the band split in May 2006 when Parker decided to go solo. Parker appeared on the 2004 CD Scissors in My Pocket by Polly Paulusma in 2004, toured the UK with David Berkeley in 2007 and has also collaborated with Sophie Solomon on her second solo studio album. More recently, Parker has composed the music for BBC Three sitcom How Not to Live Your Life and worked on the John Lennon biopic Nowhere Boy as music tutor, arranger and producer. He now has a new band, The Chain (formerly Braxton Hix), formed in 2009 with singer Kate Aumonier and produces and writes for new artists such as Pearl & the Puppets and Dutch singer Waylon.

Jason Hazeley now writes comedy, and is one of the authors of The Framley Examiner, Bollocks to Alton Towers, Far from the Sodding Crowd and Viz. He is also co-creator with comedy writer Joel Morris of the Ladybird Books For Adults series.

== Discography ==
=== Albums ===
- Hello (1999)
- Emoticons (1999)
- Ten Songs About You (2001)
- Goodbye (2003)

=== Singles ===
- "Emoticons" (1999) - UK No. 88
- "Air Guitar" (1999) - UK No. 79
- "Romeo and Juliet Are Drowning" (2000)
- "The Wild Things" (2001) - UK No. 81
- "How the Hell Do I Explain?" (2001)

=== Collaborations ===
- Slip into Something... (Kinobe featuring Ben & Jason, from the album Soundphiles, 2000) - UK No. 78
- Unfair Weather (Kinobe featuring Ben & Jason, from the album VerseBridgeChorus, 2001)
