= Laura Ashe =

British historian

Professor Laura Ashe FRHistS
- Born: Wakefield, West Yorkshire, England
- Occupations: Literary scholar and academic
- Title: Professor of English Literature

Academic background
- Education: Leeds Girls' High School
- Alma mater: Gonville and Caius College, Cambridge; Harvard University

Academic work
- Discipline: English studies, History
- Sub-discipline: Medieval studies, Renaissance studies
- Institutions: Gonville and Caius College, Cambridge; Queen Mary University of London; Worcester College, Oxford

Laura Ashe is a British historian of English medieval literature, history and culture (c. 1000–1550). She is Professor of English Literature at the University of Oxford and Fellow and Tutor in English Literature at Worcester College.

== Academic career ==
Ashe was born in Wakefield, West Yorkshire and was educated at Leeds Girls' High School. She went on to read English at Gonville and Caius College, Cambridge. She spent the year after her graduation as a Kennedy Scholar at Harvard University.

During her graduate studies, Ashe was appointed to a junior research fellowship at Gonville and Caius College.

Prior to joining Worcester College in 2008, Ashe spent two years lecturing at Queen Mary University of London.

=== Honours and awards ===
In 2009 Ashe won a Philip Leverhulme Prize, for the international impact of her research. She was awarded the Title of Distinction of Professor of English Literature by the University of Oxford in September 2018.

In 2026, Ashe's book Chaucer's Ethical Philosophy was jointly awarded the Chaucer Monograph Prize by the New Chaucer Society, sharing the award with Ingrid Nelson's Medieval Media: Bodies, Networks, Chaucer. The judges said of Ashe's work: "her book’s unabashedly personal approach yields exhilarating and intense engagement with key philosophical questions that Chaucer’s poetry raises by way of two unusual interlocutors, Wittgenstein and Hegel. With its convincing arguments, delivered with force and supported by masterful close readings, the book attests to how such traditional methods of analysis, in concert with ideas that matter to us now, continue to yield groundbreaking contributions to Chaucer studies."

== Research interests ==
Ashe's early research focused on the multilingual literary environment of England after the Norman Conquest. Her first monograph, Fiction and History in England, 1066–1200 (2007), explored how romances and chronicles written in English, French and Latin bolstered ideologies of national identity and imperialism during England's first colonial forays into Ireland.

More recent projects include a biography of Richard II (2016), a study of English literary history between 1000 and 1350 (2017), and an examination of the work of Geoffrey Chaucer in relation to the themes of subjectivity, recognition and ethical agency (2025).

Ashe has served as an editor of the journal New Medieval Literatures, published by Boydell & Brewer, since 2016.

== Media appearances ==
In 2015 Ashe was the presenter for BBC Radio 3's A Cultural History of the Plague. Since 2013 she has appeared as an expert panelist on BBC Radio 4's In Our Time series on more than ten occasions, discussing subjects such as the twelfth century renaissance, Beowulf, chivalry, Le Morte d'Arthur, purgatory, Thomas Becket, Thomas Wyatt, and Gawain and the Green Knight.

Ashe contributed to Art that Made Us, an eight-part BBC Two TV series in 2022 presenting an alternate history of Britain through art and literature. She has previously written for History Today.

Ashe appeared as an interviewee in the mockumentary series Cunk on Britain (2018) and Cunk on Earth (2022), discussing various aspects of medieval history and culture. During her appearance, she gained notable attention for a comedic segment in which the satirical host Philomena Cunk (played by Diane Morgan) asked her if King Arthur "came a lot", an intentional pun on the legendary castle Camelot.

== Selected publications ==
- Ashe, Laura (2025). Chaucer's Ethical Philosophy. Oxford: Oxford University Press. ISBN 9780198894964.
- Ashe, Laura (2016), Richard II: a brittle glory, Penguin Monarchs, Allen Lane, an imprint of Penguin Books, ISBN 978-0141979892
- Ashe, Laura (2015), Early Fiction in England: from Geoffrey of Monmouth to Chaucer, Penguin Classics, Penguin Books, ISBN 978-0141392875
- Ashe, Laura; Patterson, Ian (2014), War and Literature, Essays and Studies, v. 67, Boydell & Brewer Ltd, ISBN 978-1843843818
- Ashe, Laura (2011), Fiction and History in England, 1066-1200, Cambridge Studies in Medieval Literature, 68, Cambridge University Press, ISBN 978-0521174367
- Ashe, Laura; Djordjević, Ivana; Weiss, Judith (2010), The Exploitations of Medieval Romance, Studies in Medieval Romance, Cambridge University Press, ISBN 978-1846157882
