= Candidate (band) =

British indie band

- Origin: United Kingdom
- Genres: Folk rock
- Years active: 1998–present
- Members: Joel Morris; Alex Morris; Ian Painter; Alex Donohoe
- Website: www.candidatesite.co.uk

Candidate are an indie band from the United Kingdom, whose music has been described as folk rock, "full of gentle, dark soundscapes" and an "overflowing sink".

== Members ==
- Joel Morris – vocals, acoustic guitar
- Alex Morris – electric and acoustic guitars, vocals
- Ian Painter – bass guitar, vocals, production

Brothers Joel and Alex Morris are the co-writers of The Framley Examiner website, and the book Bollocks to Alton Towers.

== Discography ==
=== Albums ===
- Taking on the Enemy's Sound (2000)
- Tiger Flies (2002)
- Nuada (2002)
- Under the Skylon (2005)
- Oxengate (2007)
- Point Clear (2023)
