= Freshers (disambiguation) =

Freshers are people in the first year at an educational institution.

Freshers may also refer to:

- Freshers (British TV series)
- Freshers (Indian TV series)
