= Potamo =

Potamo may refer to:

Persons:

- Potamo of Alexandria, eclectic philosopher
- Potamo of Mytilene, rhetorician

Geography:

- Fiume Potamo, a small river in Calabria, Italy, a tributary of Mesima (Italian article) River
