= Myrto Hatzimichali =

Classical scholar

- Occupations: Senior Lecturer in Classics (Ancient Philosophy); Fellow and Director of Studies at Homerton College

Academic work
- Discipline: Classics
- Sub-discipline: Ancient Philosophy
- Institutions: University of Cambridge

Myrto Hatzimichali is a senior lecturer in Classics (Ancient Philosophy) at the University of Cambridge. In 2012, she joined Homerton College where she is now the director of studies in Classics and a fellow. Before teaching at Cambridge, Hatzimichali was the Leventis Lecturer on the impact of Greek culture in the Department of Classics and Ancient History at the University of Exeter, having completed her DPhil in 2006 under Nigel Wilson at the University of Oxford.

== Works ==
Hatzimichali's work focuses on the Hellenistic period, and in particular on the philosophers that first started engaging with Plato and Aristotle at that time. Her other centers of interests are Aristotle's biological works, Greek commentaries on Aristotle's Categories, and the history of philosophy in the first century BC. She is also interested in the history of the Library of Alexandria and on ancient theories on language and grammar.

In 2015, her book Potamo of Alexandria and the Emergence of Eclecticism in Late Hellenistic Philosophy was published. The Bryn Mawr Classical Review recognizes the book as "an excellent monograph" and "the first of its kind in English" on Potamo of Alexandria, a neglected figure.

The Stanford Encyclopedia of Philosophy cites Hatzimichali's work in relation to Andronicus of Rhodes, stating that "Following a recent trend in scholarship, we may want to keep Andronicus' activities of textual criticism and canon or corpus–organization separate.

== In media ==
In 2022, Hatzimichali was a guest on the first episode "In the Beginnings" of Cunk On Earth. She was also a guest in 2019 on the BBC podcast In Our Time.
