= Cunk on Earth =

British mockumentary television series

- Genre: Mockumentary
- Created by: Charlie Brooker
- Written by: Charlie Brooker; Ben Caudell; Jason Hazeley; Joel Morris; Eli Goldstone; Michael Odewale
- Directed by: Christian Watt
- Starring: Diane Morgan
- Country of origin: United Kingdom
- Original language: English
- No. of seasons: 1
- No. of episodes: 5

Production
- Executive producers: Charlie Brooker; Annabel Jones; Ali Marlow
- Running time: 28–29 minutes
- Production companies: Broke & Bones

Original release
- Network: BBC Two
- Release: 20 September – 18 October 2022

Related
- Cunk on Britain; Cunk on Life

Cunk on Earth is a British mockumentary television series produced by Charlie Brooker for the BBC and Netflix. The series stars Diane Morgan as Philomena Cunk, an ill-informed investigative reporter, a character who previously starred on Charlie Brooker's Weekly Wipe and Cunk on Britain. The series premiered in the United Kingdom on BBC Two on 20 September 2022, and was released internationally on Netflix on 31 January 2023.

Cunk on Earth was acclaimed by critics, with many praising Morgan's deadpan delivery. For her performance in the series, she was nominated for the British Academy Television Award for Best Female Comedy Performance.

== Premise ==
Philomena Cunk (/ˌfɪləˈmiːnə ˈkʌŋk/; Diane Morgan) travels around the world, interviewing (real-world) experts such as Paul Bahn, Martin Kemp, Nigel Spivey, and Shirley Thompson about world history. The series introduces subjects such as the development of agriculture and early civilisation, the rise of Christianity and Islam, the Renaissance, the Industrial Revolution, the First and Second World Wars, the Cold War, and the Space Race. Cunk concludes the series with a speculative comment on the possibility of artificial intelligence takeover.

== Contributors ==
Throughout the series, Morgan, in character as Cunk, poses absurdist questions to real-life historians, archaeologists, theologians, composers, and other subject-area experts in one-on-one interviews. The experts include:

- Jim Al-Khalili
- Laura Ashe
- Paul Bahn
- Kathleen Burk
- Gus Casely-Hayford
- Kate Cooper
- Patricia Fara
- Jonathan Ferguson
- Irving Finkel
- Myrto Hatzimichali
- Ashley Jackson
- Martin Kemp
- Aleksander Kolkowski
- John Man
- Anu Ojha
- Eleanor Robson
- Catriona Seth
- Rupert Sheldrake
- Nigel Spivey
- Shirley J. Thompson
- Joyce Tyldesley

== Episodes ==
List of Cunk on Earth episodes
No.	Title	Directed by	Original release date
1	"In the Beginnings"	Christian Watt	20 September 2022
2	"Faith/Off"	Christian Watt	27 September 2022
3	"The Renaissance Will Not Be Televised"	Christian Watt	4 October 2022
4	"Rise of the Machines"	Christian Watt	11 October 2022
5	"War(s) of the World(s)?"	Christian Watt	18 October 2022

== Production ==
The character of Philomena Cunk previously starred on Charlie Brooker's Weekly Wipe and Cunk on Britain.

Principal photography took place in late 2021.

== Release ==
The first episode of Cunk on Earth was originally scheduled to air on 19 September 2022 in the UK (BBC Two), but was postponed due to conflicting with the state funeral of Queen Elizabeth II. The series premiered in the UK on 20 September 2022 on BBC Two, with all episodes made available the same day on BBC iPlayer, and was released internationally on Netflix on 31 January 2023.

== Reception ==
=== Critical response ===
The series was acclaimed by critics, with many praising Morgan's deadpan delivery. On Rotten Tomatoes, the series has an approval rating of 100% based on 23 reviews and an average rating of 7.7/10. The site's critical consensus reads, "Diane Morgan feigns dopiness with ingenious comedic timing in Cunk on Earth, a gut-busting sendup of anthropological documentaries." Metacritic, which uses a weighted average, assigned a score of 82 out of 100 based on 8 critics.

David Bianculli of NPR gave the series a positive review, stating that it has "cult classic potential". The Hollywood Reporter's Daniel Fienberg called it a "consistently droll, frequently delightful series that mixes high and low comedy at a breakneck pace." Rebecca Nicholson of The Guardian praised Morgan's performance, calling her character "so well-written it's easy to forget she's not real." Michael Idato of The Sydney Morning Herald described the show as "magnificent, brutal, and absurd".

=== Accolades ===
At the 2023 British Academy Television Awards, Morgan was nominated for Best Female Comedy Performance for her performance as Philomena Cunk.
