= Ashley Jackson (historian) =

British historian

- Born: 24 June 1971 (age 55)
- Occupation: Professor

Academic background
- Education: B.A., Greenwich, 1992; M.St., Oxford, 1993; Ph.D., Oxford, 1996

Academic work
- Discipline: Imperial and Military History
- Sub-discipline: British Empire History
- Institutions: King's College London

Ashley Jackson (born 24 June 1971) is a professor of imperial and military history in the Defence Studies Department at King's College London and a visiting fellow at Kellogg College, University of Oxford. Jackson is a specialist in the history of the British Empire.

== Early life and education ==
Ashley Jackson was born in Bristol, England on 24 June 1971. He attended the University of Greenwich, from which he received a Bachelor of Arts degree in 1992, and Oxford University, from which he received a Master of Studies degree in 1993 and a Doctor of Philosophy degree in 1996. His dissertation was about the history of World War II and British imperial Botswana (then formally known as the Bechuanaland Protectorate).

== Career ==
=== Academia ===
Jackson is Professor of Imperial and Military History at King's College London. He specializes in studying the global military strategy of the British Empire. His first book, Botswana, 1939–1945: An African Country at War, published in 1999, was adapted from his dissertation; it covers the recruitment and demobilization of the African Auxiliary Pioneer Corps as well as the wartime Botswanan home front experience. The Times Literary Supplement called it a "fascinating study". His second book, published in 2001 and considered thematically similar to his first by the Journal of Southern African Studies, was War and Empire in Mauritius and the Indian Ocean and analyzed British Mauritius during World War II. According to African Affairs, Botswana, 1939–1945 and War and Empire were "two useful, excellent books". His third book was published in 2006 as The British Empire and the Second World War, taking on "the whole of the British Empire in the war years" in what African Affairs called "an important book" and "an accurate account of the contributions made by dominions and colonies". In 2016, Jackson told The Independent that he believed the British public needed "better education" in a "warts and all understanding" of British imperial history that acknowledged the exploitative dimensions of the British Empire.

=== Television ===
Jackson appears as himself in Cunk on Earth, a 2022 mockumentary about human history created by the BBC.

== Selective bibliography ==
- Jackson, Ashley (1999). Botswana, 1939–1945: An African Country at War. Oxford Historical Monographs. Clarendon Press. ISBN 978-0198207641.
- — (2001). War and Empire in Mauritius and the Indian Ocean. Palgrave Macmillan. ISBN 978-0-333-96840-6.
- — (2006). The British Empire and the Second World War. Hambledon Continuum. ISBN 1-85285-417-0.
- — (2009). Mad Dogs and Englishmen: A Grand Tour of the British Empire at Its Height. Quercus Publishing. ISBN 978-1847246073.
- — (2010). Distant Drums: The Role of Colonies in British Imperial Warfare. Sussex Academic Press. ISBN 978-1-84519-438-3.
- — (2011). Churchill. Quercus. ISBN 978-1-84916-547-1.
- —; Tomkins, David (2011). Illustrating Empire: A Visual History of British Imperialism. Visual History from the John Johnson Collection of Printed Ephemera. Bodleian Library Publishing and University of Chicago Press. ISBN 9781851243341.
- — (2013). The British Empire: A Very Short Introduction. Very Short Introductions. Oxford University Press. ISBN 978-0-19-960541-5.
- — (2013). Buildings of Empire. Oxford University Press. ISBN 978-0-19-958938-8.
- — (2018). Persian Gulf Command: A History of the Second World War in Iran and Iraq. Yale University Press. ISBN 978-0-300-22196-1.
- — (2018). Ceylon at War, 1939–1945. War & Military Culture in South Asia, 1757–1947. Helion and Company. ISBN 978-1912390656.
- — (2018). Of Islands, Ports and Sea Lanes: Africa and the Indian Ocean in the Second World War. War and Military Culture in South Asia, 1757–1947. Helion and Company. ISBN 978-1912390748.

== Selective filmography ==
Air date	Series	Installment	Role
12 March 2012	Empire	"Playing the Game"	Himself
March 2014	Heir Hunters	Series 8	Himself
10 April 2018	Cunk on Britain	"The Empire Strikes Back"	Himself
17 April 2018	Cunk on Britain	"The Third Episode"	Himself
24 April 2018	Cunk on Britain	"Twentieth Century Shocks"	Himself
23 February 2022	BBC Online	"Did Darkest Hour Get Much Right?"	Himself
20 September 2022	Cunk on Earth	"Rise of the Machines"	Himself
20 September 2022	Cunk on Earth	"War(s) of the World(s)?"	Himself

== See also ==
- Historiography of the British Empire
