= Blackgang Chine =

Amusement park on the Isle of Wight

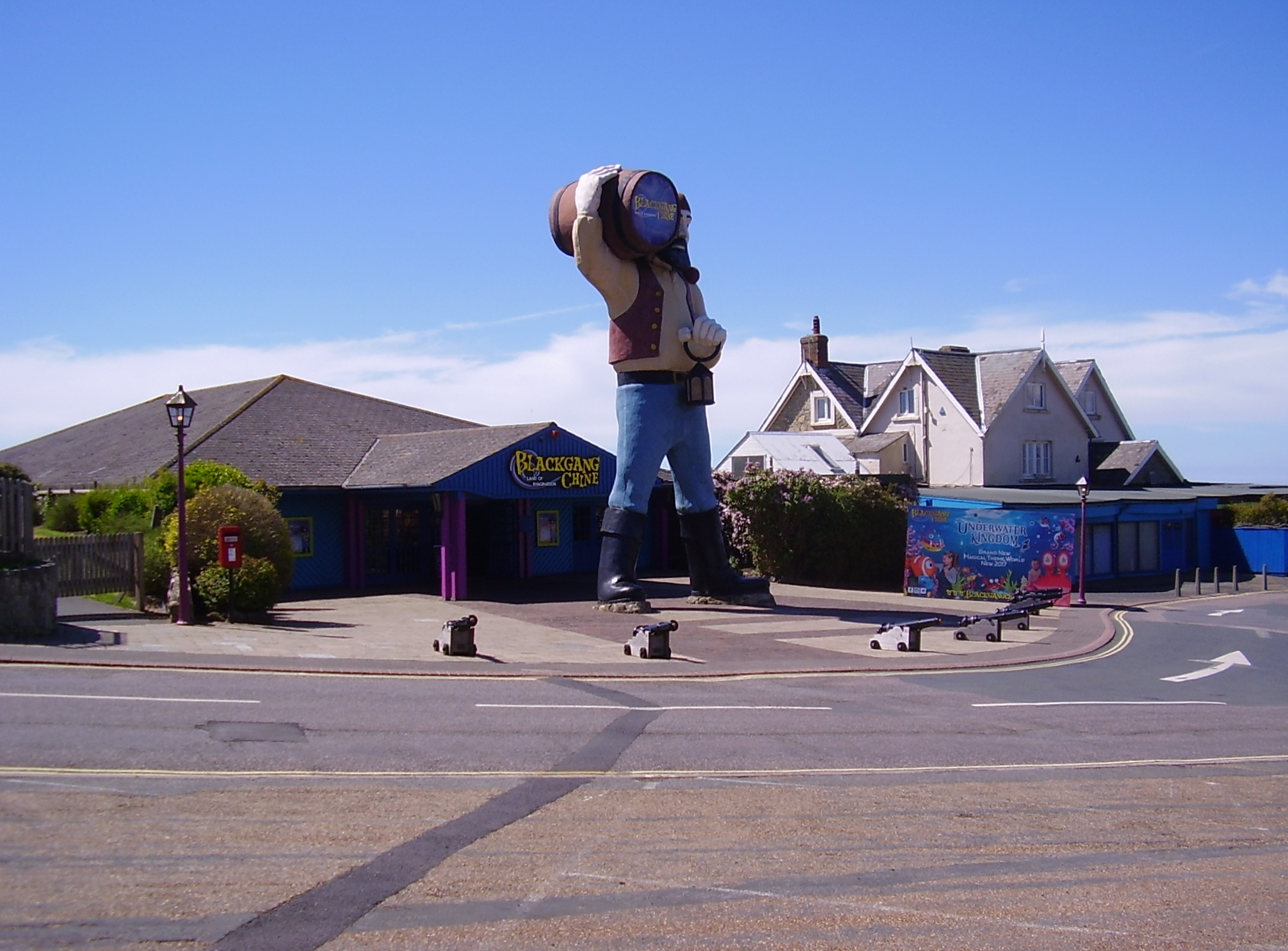
- Entrance to Blackgang Chine amusement park
- Interactive map of Blackgang Chine
- Location: Blackgang, Isle of Wight, England, United Kingdom
- Coordinates: 50.58889°N 1.31444°W
- Status: Operating
- Opened: 1843
- Owner: Alexander Dabell/Vectis Ventures Ltd/The Dabell Family
- General manager: Dan White
- Slogan: The Land Of Imagination
- Operating season: March to November

Attractions
- Total: 5
- Roller coasters: 0
- Water rides: 1
- Website: Blackgangchine.com

Blackgang Chine is an amusement park in Blackgang, Isle of Wight, United Kingdom. It was opened in 1843 and is the oldest amusement park in the United Kingdom. The park includes multiple themed "lands", including Pirate Cove, Restricted Area 5, Fairy Land and Village, and Cowboy Town. Owing to the unstable land on which the park is situated, landslides occur frequently, and attractions have been moved further inland to safer ground on several occasions.

== History ==
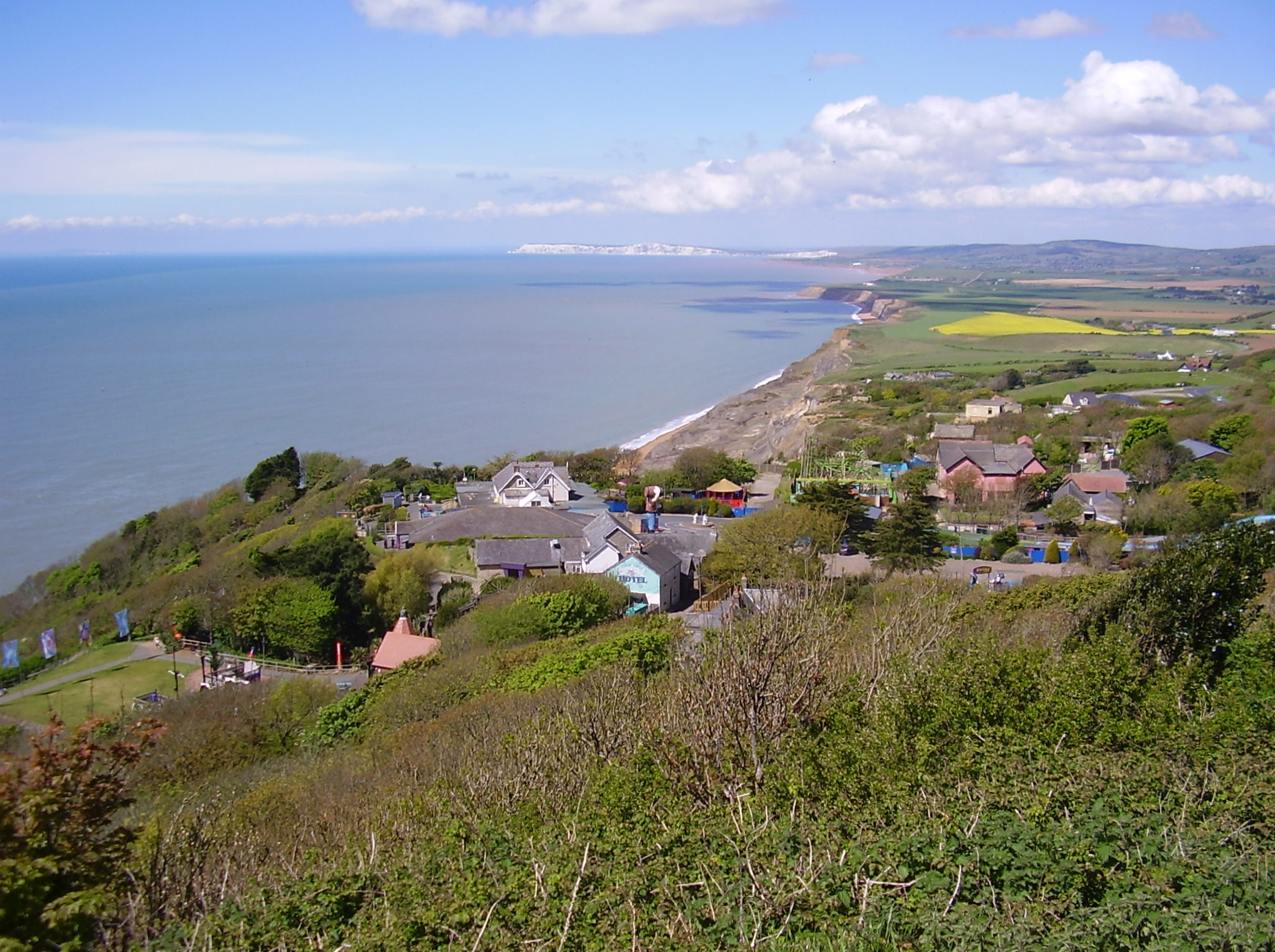
The site of Blackgang Chine

Blackgang Chine (Isle of Wight)

The original chine was a steep gault ravine overlooking Chale Bay, stretching around three-quarters of a mile down to the shore. It was visited by few people other than local fishermen and smugglers. On 11 October 1836 the cargo ship Clarendon was wrecked at the foot of Blackgang Chine, with the loss of many aboard.

During Victorian times, people were seeking out new healthy holiday resorts, and the Isle of Wight was becoming an increasingly attractive holiday destination. Alexander Dabell, the founder of the park, soon realised the business potential of this, trying various ventures. In 1839 Dabell became friends with a publican who had recently built a hotel at Blackgang, which now forms the Chine Cafe and administration offices. In the light of the increasing popularity of Sandrock Spring (an adjacent chalybeate spring), he speculated that gardens could be set up that would appeal to the Victorians as a holiday destination. Dabell took out a lease for the site in 1842 and Blackgang Chine amusement park opened in 1843, with pathways built down to the ravine and gardens landscaped on the cliffs. Steps were built to give access to the beach from the lower road. It has, as of 2008, remained a family business, owned by descendants of Dabell. A 19 m fin whale skeleton, washed up near the coast of The Needles in 1842, is still a showpiece today.

=== The chine today ===
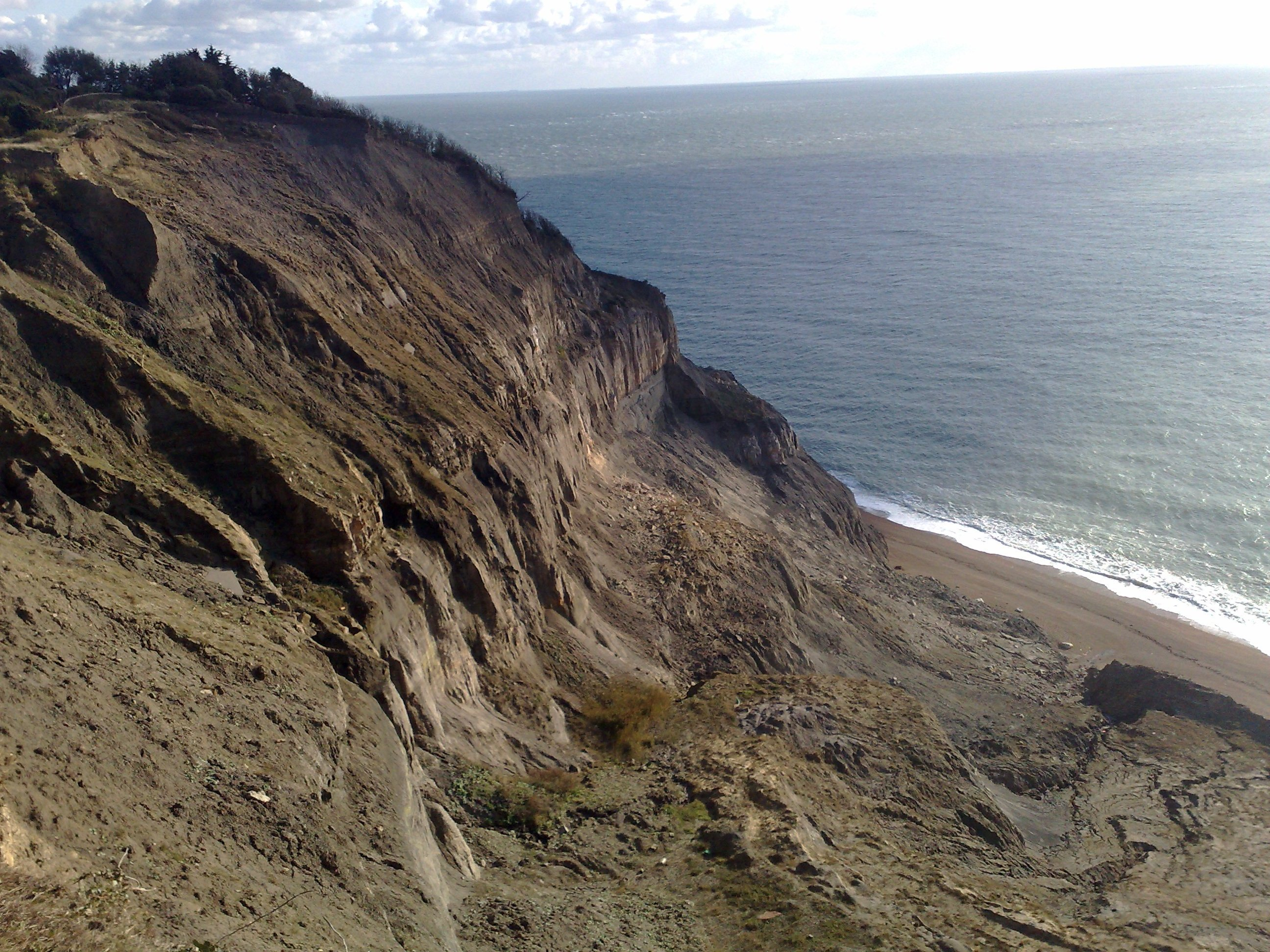
The remains of the Chine in 2008

Owing to recurring landslides, the chine itself has been destroyed, and coastal erosion has a significant impact on the area today. The park's focus now is themed entertainment for families with young children, lifesize animatronic dinosaurs being a noted feature. Clifftop walks in and around the area give panoramic views of the English Channel and the south-western Isle of Wight coast.

Although the etymology is simply "black pathway", the theme park fosters the interpretation of a smuggling origin: visitors to the park are greeted by a gigantic fibreglass statue of a smuggler between whose legs they can pass to enter.

The Blackgang Chine park is featured in the book Bollocks to Alton Towers, concerned with "uncommonly British days out", and in a related documentary,Far From the Sodding Crowd. In a 2010 interview, actor Rupert Grint stated that his family's favourite holiday was visiting the Isle of Wight, their favourite attraction being Blackgang Chine.

The park is frequently associated with ghosts, particularly related to smugglers, with several tales of sightings around the park. In 2008 a video was recorded, showing what appeared to be the apparition of a girl in a blue dress.

== Geology ==
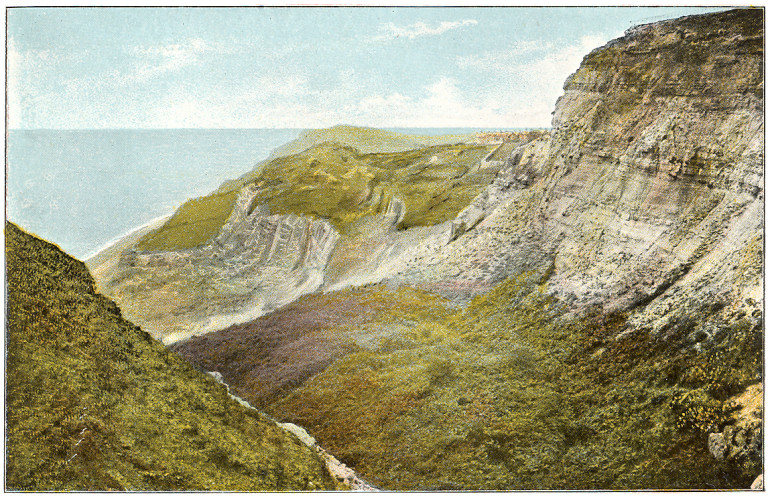
Blackgang Chine circa 1910

Located below the village of Blackgang on the southern coast of the Isle of Wight, at the western end of the Undercliff, Blackgang Chine was historically a dramatic coastal ravine. In 1800 it was described as a "steep gaunt ravine" descending 150 m (490 ft) over about 1.2 km (1/2 mi).

The area is located on unstable ground caused by underlying Gault Clay strata, leading to repeated landslides that gave the coastline a rugged appearance similar to the better-known Jurassic Coast of southern England. Currently, the cliffs are eroding at a rate of about 3.5 m (11 ft) per year, although the process is irregular and unpredictable.

Continuing landslides and coastal erosion swept away the paths in the early 1900s, and over the following decades destroyed the original chine itself. The instability of the cliffs has repeatedly forced the park owners to move clifftop facilities further inland.

== Park guide ==
The park covers over 40 acres of cliff-top gardens and themed 'lands', containing outdoor rides and walkthrough attractions, plus heritage exhibitions. Below is a list of the attractions currently in operation at the park:

Attraction	Date opened	Description	Image
Blackgang Beach	2024	A sensory experience based around a beach, featuring palm trees, washed up cargo and an interactive pool that visitors can walk over without getting their feet wet. Located on the former site of Cliffhanger. The large water pillow used as the sea was formerly at Robin Hill and known as The Ripple.	Blackgang Beach teaser advertising 2024 Blackgang Beach Blackgang Beach rules board
The Jolly Robin	2024 /25	A ghostly pirate ship ride located in the newly extended Pirate Cove. The Jolly Robin was formerly called Colossus and was re-sited with an upgrade from Robin Hill. The A-frame was installed in 2024 including a new wooden area. The ride opened in 2025.	The teaser poster for the Jolly Robin The Jolly Robin
Extinction	2023	A pendulum thrill ride that rotates 360 degrees spinning the rider around as well as a complete 360° loop-the-loop, reaching a height of 18 metres.	Extinction seen from below Extinction seen from the entrance
Shipwrecked	2022	A ride themed as a large wrecked galleon, in which a gondola containing three rows of seats is rotated clockwise and anti-clockwise in a vertical circle, reaching a height of approximately 10 m. This ride was closed towards the end of the 2022 season after it collapsed. It reopens in 2024.	Shipwrecked at Blackgang Chine
Water Force	1998	A 100 ft-long water slide with three chutes, which visitors descend in small boats. Two of the chutes are open and referred to as 'Overflow 1' and 'Overflow 2'. The third is enclosed and known as the 'Plughole'.	Waterforce
Pirate Barrels	2006	A themed version of the traditional fairground teacups.	Pirate Barrels
Pirate Cove	2012	Themed area featuring a pirate play ship 'The Flying Raven' and a French frigate 'L' Mistral'. Onboard are water cannons that can be aimed at the opposing ship. The cove also features the Crossbones play area, opened in 2007, with climbing nets, rope bridges and slides. Several themed buildings surround the pirate ships, including 'The Vortex' (see separate description) and a pirate shooting gallery. Pirate Cove was previously the site for New Adventureland.	Pirate Cove in context next to Crossbones The pirate ships One of the ships at Pirate Cove
The Vortex	2011	A walkthrough rotating 'trommel' tunnel that creates an optical illusion to disorientate visitors. This attraction was originally called 'The Sailor's Return', and later 'The Cask and Weevil', before being renamed again in 2018.	Inside the Vortex The Vortex
Giant Smuggler	1987	A giant fibreglass smuggler located outside the current entrance to the park.	The giant smuggler at Blackgang Chine
Shop and entrance facilities	1986	The current incarnation of the shop/bazaar and entrance is based on the inside of a galleon. It was built next door to the old Ship Ashore Inn.	Inside the current shop and entrance area
Underwater Kingdom	2017	Animated outdoor trail themed as an underwater experience. It is built around the old second modern incarnation of the Smugglers' Cave leading to an audio and visual colourful animated walkthrough experience featuring Giuseppe the talking crab, a giant whale, and others. It is built on the site of the old Fantasy Land and the derelict Blackgang to Niton coach road.	Giuseppe the crab at the entrance to the Underwater Kingdom The giant whale at the Underwater Kingdom Inside the Underwater Kingdom Entrance to the Underwater Kingdom Inside the Underwater Kingdom The shell seat at the Underwater Kingdom
Talking Telescopes	1990s	Coin-operated telescopes located at Nursery Land and Pirate Cove. A third may have been located near the maze and water gardens but was removed in the 2010s. A narration tells stories of smuggling, folklore, views that are seen, and more. As of 2025 the talking telescope at Nursery Land has been removed. A talking telescope, possibly the Nursery Land one has been installed near Bug Walk in 2025.	Talking telescope in Nursery Land 2024
Cowboy Town	1994	Full-scale Old West frontier town including a saloon, jail, covered wagons, undertakers and bank. It also features a café (La Cantina), selling American-style food, and a shop (General Stores), selling cap guns and cowboy-themed supplies. This attraction was originally Buffalo Creek in Isle of Wight County before its relocation in 1994. After it was relocated it was renamed in a 1990s guidebook as Buffalo Canyon. It has gone through a couple of name changes since. Many of the original features from its first layout were retained during this move, the notable exceptions being Fort Buffalo, the trapper's cabin, and the Trading Post building.	A game of cards in the saloon A view of Cowboy Town looking north Inside the saloon bar at Cowboy Town A view of Cowboy Town looking south A bank robbery in Cowboy Town The undertaker
Restricted Area 5	2014	Themed trail with animated dinosaurs that roar and move when approached by visitors. It was redeveloped from the original Dinosaurland trail and retains several of the original figures. In 2022 a new walkway and below ground footpath was added, including new dinosaurs. For 2025 due to cliff erosion new pathways were installed or rerouted. The giant T-Rex was also turned around 180 degrees.	Restricted Area 5 entrance The giant animated T-Rex at Restricted Area 5 The stegosaurus, one of the original dinosaurs from the 1970s Restricted area 5
Mouth of Hell	1972	A giant head that can be explored and climbed inside. Originally opened with 'Dinosaurland' but relocated in 2016.	The Mouth of Hell Inside the Mouth of Hell
Dinostore	2016	A dinosaur-themed shopping outlet located in the former Hall of Mirrors area. Now an amusement arcade as of 2025.	dinostore Inside Dinostore 2025
Boot Hill	1976	A collection of wooden crosses depicting the names of fictional people and their humorous causes of death. Originally in Buffalo Creek it was re-sited and expanded with Boot Hill 2 in 1994 when Cowboy Town was moved.	boot hill
Rumpus Crypt		Located near Rumpus Mansion on the lawn.	Rumpus Crypt
Pirate Blasta		Pirate themed water cannon shooting arcade game.	Pirate Blasta
iScream		Ice cream parlour catering for humans and dogs.	iScream
Chocobloc		An outlet selling sweet treats. Formerly the Waffle House. The building was originally a house called Brackadale.	chocobloc
The Quack Shack		A small arcade containing two crane grab machines and a change dispenser located in Pirate Cove. The two bones are reused from the former Fort Tortuga entrance.	The Quack Shack exterior The Quack Shack interior
Treasure Cove Shooting Gallery		Shooting gallery with various life size interactive pirate characters located in Pirate Cove.	Treasure Cove Shooting Gallery exterior Treasure Cove
Way Out West Shooting Gallery		Shooting gallery with various life size interactive cowboy characters.	Way Out West Shooting Gallery Way Out West Shooting Gallery interior
Rumpus Mansion	1993	An animated haunted walkthrough attraction inside an old manor house, now infested with boggarts, goblins and other creatures from folklore. Rumpus Mansion was built inside of an old residential blackgang dwelling called Five Rocks. It was added as the big new attraction for Blackgang Chine's 150th birthday.	rumpus mansion rumpus mansion Entrance to Rumpus Mansion
The Musical Pet Shop	1992	A humorous 'pet shop' hosted by Mr Mel-O-Dee with animated singing animals that come to life when buttons are pressed. The attraction was updated with a tweak to some of the animals and the music in 2020.	inside the Musical Pet Shop The Musical Pet Shop exterior
Valley of the Dodos	2013	Wooden outdoor trail featuring animated Dodo figures that squawk at passers by. The premise is explained, on attraction signs, as the Dodos having hatched from eggs left behind by a pirate fleet, and uncovered in the park many years later. The area was partly restyled for 2018, adding more dodos and a rope net bridge.	Valley of the Dodos Valley of the Dodos in 2023 Valley of the Dodos in 2013
Crooked House	1968	A small walkthrough attraction of disorientating crooked corridors and humorous scenes. Originally located in Adventureland, resited near the Valley of the Dodos in the late 1980s. In 2022 the crooked house was completely revamped inside, removing all previous exhibits. Now it features a cowboy and fairy themed interior of animated cut out talking characters. Some of the in house narration was changed for 2024.	the new interior of the crooked house the new interior of the crooked house Crooked House exterior
Moby Dick's Revenge	1974	Giant whale, inside which jets of water are squirted at visitors. This was originally part of Nurseryland, named Jonah's Whale, and featured aquaria containing live tropical fish. It was relocated opposite the Cliffhanger rollercoaster. In the first week of April 2024 the whale was dismantled in sections and moved from the old St. Catherine's Quay site. The repainted, slightly redesigned whale opened in summer 2024.	The whale resited awaiting a repaint April 2024 the whale in the 1970s
NurseryLand	1974	A wooded trail featuring scenes depicting characters of various nursery rhymes, many of which are animated, including 'The House That Jack Built', a two-level walkthrough where visitors are challenged to find all of the animals and characters mentioned in the rhyme. Characters include Humpty Dumpty, The Three Little Pigs, Hickory Dickory Dock, See Saw Marjorie Daw, Old Mother Hubbard, and an enormous shoe that houses a Little Old Woman. Also in Nurseryland is the wishing tree, a tree that houses a family of musical pixies. A vicar on a seat provides a popular photo opportunity, along with a toadstool which since the 1990s has had its date changed annually to the corresponding year. Nurseryland was sited on an area previously on park maps named as the fern Glen. It was expanded for the 1980 season with new additions. Little Miss Muffet was removed circa 2020. As of 2025 NurseryLand has a new perimeter fence. As of 2025 a new entrance pathway is going in nearer the chine café. As of 2025 the NurseryLand lookout viewpoint platform and talking telescope have been removed due to continual cliff erosion in the area.	New Nursery Land entrance for 2025 The dated toadstool The wishing tree in Nurseryland Nurseryland seen from The House That Jack Built The vicar Old Mother Hubbard
Fairyland	2011	Themed as a Fairy Village, this area includes the Fairy Castle, with scenes depicting the story of Sleeping Beauty (first opened in 1973, re-sited in 1990, then again in 1994 following the landslip of that year). According to a 1990 guidebook the castle is based on one in Austria. Fairyland includes the sad looking toadstool, a toadstool seating area.	The sad toadstool Fairyland Houses Fairy Castle
Snakes and Ladders	1990	A hillside re-imagining of the board game, with steps leading up to large slides at different levels. Relocated to its current location after land movement in 1994.	Snakes and Ladders
Captain Jack's	1992	A shop located in Pirate Cove selling food, drinks, toys and souvenirs.	Captain Jack's
New Chimney Pot Walk	2025	A new walkthrough featuring the original chimney pots from the first chimney pot walk. Located near Nursery Land and also scattered around in Nursery Land.	New Chimney Pot Walk
Arcade	2025	A selection of coin operated arcade games, located in the former Picture house / Wight Experience building.	Arcade entrance 2025
Talking Rubbish Bins	1990s	Talking rubbish bins in the shapes of various characters faces asking visitors to deposit their rubbish in their mouths. Each bin has multiple sayings when approached. Located at iScream, Chocabloc, La Cantina, and The Jolly Robin.	iScream talking rubbish bin One of the talking rubbish bins Talking bin in Cowboy Town Jolly Robin talking bin
Hall of Mirrors	2016 (in present form) Originally installed in 1933.	The original Hall of Mirrors was one of the first attractions at the park, with ten mirrors from Paris being installed in 1933 in a house called St. Catherine's, the childhood home of actress Sheila Hancock. On early park maps it is shown west of the old main entrance. It was housed in a metal corrugated iron structure. It moved to the current version of the entrance and shop in 1986. It closed in 2013 to make way for the 'Dinostore' shop, but re-opened in 2016 in a new location next to the 'BBC Coast' exhibition.	Inside the Hall of Mirrors Exterior of the Hall of Mirrors
Hedge Maze	1963	A large hedge maze built on the putting green of the Blackgang Hotel, with viewing platform for spectators to offer help to those inside. Over 5000 privet bushes were used in its construction. The maze was originally conceived at the same time as the water gardens. It was extended in the late 1960s.	The maze looking seaward
Giant Bug Walk	2009	A hillside trail featuring giant arthropod models, along with an oversized garden shed inhabited by talking gnomes.	The talking gnomes seat Giant spiders
Whale Museum	2010 (in current form)	Exhibition which features the park's original 19-metre-long fin whale skeleton (on display since 1843). The ancient wooden wishing chair is also found near the whale's head.	The wishing chair Inside the whale museum and skeleton
Chine valley gardens and musical bridge	1987	A short landscaped walkway that meanders through a natural brook incorporating a small bridge playing tranquil music. Located south of Extinction. Originally discovered in 1985 in scrubland and opened in 1987.	The musical bridge in the chine valley
The Disappearing Village Exhibition	1994	An exhibition showing the history of Blackgang's landslips in old photographs, newspaper cuttings and models. Later a landslip simulator room was added featuring BBC local news footage of the landslides of 1994.	The landslip simulator room at the Disappearing Village Exhibition

== Former attractions ==
Attraction	Date opened	Date closed	Description	Image
Evolution	2022	2025	A 12m-tall drop ride styled as an observation tower, overlooking a Jurassic excavation site and the Restricted Area 5 dinosaur trail. A gondola, seating two rows of five riders, is lifted to the top of the tower before being released in a sequence of rapid drops . The ride was removed over the winter of 2025 due to continual cliff erosion .	Evolution Tunnel Extinction
Chine Cliff Steps	1843	1960s	Various sets of cliff steps which lead down to the beach below. Due to coastal erosion, the last iteration of the steps appear to have been permanently closed in the early 1960s. During its final years, the steps began at the top of the chine near a wooden summerhouse-style hut. The winding steps were frequently featured in vintage postcards.	The Chine Cliff Steps as seen in the 1960s
Jurassica Dinosaur Encounter	2023	2023	This attraction was situated on the site of Cliffhanger. It served as a seating area for interactive shows.	
Pirate Bounty	2022	2024	Small arcade consisting of a crane grab machine to win a soft toy.	Pirate Bounty
Chimney Pot Walk	mid 1960s	2024	A short walkthrough of various old chimney pots of differing shapes and sizes. The main large chimney pots are laid out to look like a chess set complete with a black and white chequered board. A natural water source also flows through the gardens. The original footpath had stepping stones made from concrete slabs with water flowing through. This was near the small pond. Due to the constant erosion of the cliff edge the chimney pots were removed and the pathway through the attraction was closed.	Former Chimney Pot Walk. Closed as of 2025 Chimney Pot Walk
Crackerjack Amusement Arcade	Unknown	1980s	A small amusement arcade located at the front of the park, in what is now the Chine Café. The attraction consisted of pinball machines and Shoot-'em-up games.	Crackerjack Amusement Arcade, c.1980 (now removed)
St. Catherine's Quay	1984	2016	A maritime exhibition that showcased a genuine lifeboat, the RNLB Friendly Forester, an operational engine from the 1914 Cox & Co of Falmouth paddle steamer, Compton Castle, a recreation of a longshoreman's 19th century quay and several other maritime exhibits pertaining to the history of the island's ferry services. The attraction also featured whale bones and a wishing chair.	St. Catherines Quay
Cliffhanger	2005	2022	A modestly-sized rollercoaster – Cliffhanger – once perched 400 feet above the sea and was located close to the cliff's edge. It reached a height of 11 metres before suddenly dropping and then curving and twisting at roughly 35 kilometres per hour. The ride was removed at the end of the 2022 season. As of April 2023, the ride has since been renamed Rock 'N' Roller and is currently located at Dreamland Margate.	
Aviaries	Unknown	1980s	A small aviary located near the Model Village and Water Gardens.	
Fort Buffalo	1985	1989	A large wooden play-fort featuring turrets, rope swings and walkways, Fort Buffalo was located on a plateau just below Buffalo Creek. As with many other attractions in the park, it was disused due to coastal erosion.	
Jungleland	1978/9	2008	Jungleland was located just south-east of Dinosaurland. The walkthrough attraction featured life-size fibreglass jungle animals, Tarzan, and with jungle sounds. Some of these fibreglass animals have since been relocated to Blackgang Chine's sister park, Robin Hill.	Jungleland c.1980 (now removed) Former site of Jungleland in 2024
Adventureland	1970	1986	Closed due to coastal erosion. The attraction featured a collection of old military vehicles and a replica of Stardust, the spacecraft prop featured in the 1979 Disney film, Unidentified Flying Oddball. A representation of the NASA Mission Control building was opened in 1980 and can still be seen today. Adventureland was the original location of the Crooked House, as evident by the still visible concrete base, and Smugglers Cave. The area also included a children's roundabout, swings and a slide. In 2018, the corroding remains of the roundabout were permanently removed from the park.	The remains of Adventureland's Mission Control The remains of Adventureland, 2008
New Adventureland	1986/87	Unknown	Replaced the original Adventureland area due to coastal erosion. Formerly sited on the current Pirate Cove. Stardust was transported from its original location to New Adventureland. The area featured Lunar Base, a replacement for the disused Mission Control and play equipment.	Stardust, one of the items re-sited to New Adventureland
Smugglerland	1978	2011	Originally featured the Jolly Smuggler play ship, a tree-top walk, the Smugglers Rest play inn, and the Smugglers' Cave, an animated walkthrough with scenes depicting the 1836 Clarendon shipwreck at Blackgang. Smugglerland was originally sited east of the original adventureland. Both were resited and restyled after frequent landslides in the late 1980s.	Smugglerland relocated and expanded version 1982
Fantasyland	1991	2016	A themed area of the park, completed in 1991 and comprising the attractions The Weather Wizard (opened in 1989), The Angry Dragon, The Mice in the Toadstool, and The Licorice Factory. These attractions were removed and the area completely redeveloped to become Underwater Kingdom, which opened in 2017. The Dragon returned to the park for 2019, restyled and situated in a large crate outside of the main entrance. The dragon was named Cedric by the park.	The liquorice factory in Fantasyland (now removed)
Dinosaurland	1972	2013	An outdoor trail featuring life size fibreglass dinosaurs. In the 1980s further fibreglass dinosaurs were added to the original six. On 1972 park maps, Dinosaurland is named Dinosaur Zoo. This name was changed to Dinosaurland This area was upgraded with new animatronic dinosaur figures to become Restricted Area 5 in 2014. Some of the original static models were retained.	The Tyrannosaurus Rex information stone Dinosaurland (now removed)
Blackgang Bluff Observatory And Play Equipment	unknown	1950s	Located on an area of jutting out coastline marked on maps as Blackgang Bluff. The bluff being a steep slope in the cliff at a vertical angle. A wooden raised platform observatory facing west. Nearby was a wooden child's swing and see-saw. Adjacent was a large wooden hut containing a set of avery weighing scales.	
Buffalo Creek	1976	1994	A full-size walkthrough of a wild-west cowboy town, complete with an Indian teepee village. Located in Frontierland and called Buffalo Creek in Isle of Wight county. Built by pinewood studios. Including a bank, gold mine, saloon bar, jail, sit on horse and wagons, full size locomotive, blacksmiths and more. Constructed way down in a wooded area that was originally land owned by the southlands house. A trapper's cabin depicting a Davey Crockett–style character outside of a log cabin, with a mule and two grizzly bears outside. Parts were removed following the 1994 landslip; the remainder was relocated uphill to form Buffalo Canyon, now the Cowboy Town.	A view of cowboy town in Buffalo Creek, Isle of Wight county
The Triassic Club	1994	2016	An animated walkthrough attraction featuring animatronic talking dinosaurs welcoming you to join them for lunch. Featuring Wallace the butler and Darwin the allosaurus. Built on the site of the old swimming pool of the adjacent Five Rocks house (Rumpus Mansion) The Triassic Dinner Club was removed in 2016, but the dinosaurs have made two appearances at events since. This area now houses the Mouth of Hell.	Inside the triassic club
Smugglers Cave	1954	2016	A themed walkthrough with animated displays, depicting the story of the ship Clarendon that was wrecked at Blackgang in 1836. It originally opened as a simpler version south of the maze as marked on a 1969 map. It was then moved to Adventureland in the far west corner of the park in the 1970s. In 1980 the cave was completely revamped inside. Finally, after the late 1980s, it was moved to a new location near Fantasyland with more animation and built around a building that was the old garage to a house called Brackadale. Its interior exhibits were removed in 2016/17 and have not been relocated elsewhere in the park. The empty interior of the Smugglers' Cave now forms the entrance of the Underwater Kingdom since 2017. Some of the original smugglers that guarded the cave entrance are now sited near the entrance to the Chine car park.	The smugglers cave entrance A lantern inside the smugglers cave
Fort Tortuga	1997	2007	Themed pirate fort play area, with slides, climbing nets and raised walkways. Also in the fort was a strongroom containing a locked treasure chest and a giant compass. Hidden around the fort were four compass directions. Entering these into the compass opened the treasure chest, revealing pirate gold inside. This area was replaced by The Wight Experience in 2008. The skull from the entrance of Fort Tortuga was reused at the entrance to the pirates play area near Dodo Valley. Two of the bones have been reused outside of the Quack Shack.	The entrance to fort tortuga (now unused)
Rumpus Clock Tower	1994	2005	Animated clock tower which formed the entrance to the bridge towards Rumpus Mansion. At fifteen and thirty minute intervals, various monsters and goblins emerged from behind doors. Upon the hour, a trow lifted the roof up, and two giant gargoyles next to the clock rocked back and forth. A surviving goblin can be found at the entrance to the current Fairyland. A surviving gargoyle can be found near Rumpus Lawn by a pathway.	A survivor from the rumpus mansion clock tower
Water Gardens	1962	2017	A series of ponds, waterfalls and fountains that were originally constructed by the Chine's own staff for 1962. In the 1980s the Water Gardens also featured six foot high bubble tubes, filled with water and illuminated at night. Due to their eventual proximity to the cliff edge, they were partially redeveloped in 2016. The last remaining pond was filled in during the winter of 2017. From their construction up until 2006, these gardens were one of the main features of the park to be illuminated at night. These illuminations were reinstated from 2015, using new LED lighting.	The Water Gardens in 2012 (part closed)
Floodlights	1936	early 2000s	Thousands of coloured light lighting up the Chine gardens, ponds, and pathways. Later to include the themed areas. Advertised as open until 10 PM.	
Floodlights (LED)	2015	2017/18	A reeboot of the floodlit evenings with modern LED lighting. Lighting up the paths, ponds, gore cliff, and all themed areas.	The LED lighting along one of blackgang chines footpaths
Butterfly Walk	2008	2017	Larger-than-life butterflies, with signs denoting their respective names.	
Chine Cascade	unknown	1970s	An area built around a small planted up natural water cascade featuring garden gnomes; it was located near the model village and water gardens.	Chine cascade at blackgang chine (lost to coastal erosion)
Magical Music Factory	2002	2010	A walk-in experience located in the building on Pirate Cove now operating as 'The Vortex'. In a darkened room lit with UV lighting, visitors could choose to stand facing one of two sets of vertical light beams. When a hand was passed through a light beam, different music samples would start or stop - these were from various popular music tracks of the time, changed seasonally. By passing their hand through the different beams, visitors could 'mix' different elements of the track together. In guidebooks, the attraction was highlighted with the description "magical beams of light make you a disco diva".	The magical music factory (removed)
Myths and Legends	2001	2013	Film show narrated by Shaw Taylor, telling the stories of local legends, including the famous Giant of Chale, as well as tales of smuggling and shipwrecks at Blackgang.	
The Wight Experience / The Picture House	2009	2017	Film show of aerial views of the island by helicopter. Produced by Flying Pictures, who worked on many of the James Bond and Harry Potter films.	Former site of the wight experience / the picture house 2023
Gnomes Garden	1934	2014	Opened in 1934 to raise money for the local district nurse so they could have a car. A collection of mainly German garden gnomes doing various day-to-day chores. Most famous are the gambling gnomes playing cards. Re-sited a few times, latterly called Gnomeywood, a play on the word Hollywood. This latter version was opposite chimney pot walk. The last gnomes garden was near the current park entrance but since removed. Most gnomes are believed to now be in storage, but a few have escaped and can be found located especially in the Underwater Kingdom and Nursery Land.	The gnomes garden at blackgang chine (now removed)
Museum	1958	c1984	A 1960s guidebook states that the museum housed many relics from shipwrecks along the coastline. Also ships in glass bottles, lifebelts from shipwrecks, the wishing chair, and the giant whale skeleton. Attached to the old entrance the Museum was closed when the entrance was relocated. Some of the exhibits were then transferred to St. Catherine's Quay.	
World of Timber / Blackgang sawmill	1981	2016	Opened to the public on Friday April 17, 1981. Entry price was originally adults 30p, children 20p. Originally called Blackgang Sawmill, it was a separate attraction from the main park (though visitors could buy a combined ticket for both). The original narration was by TV presenter John Craven. It was an award-winning heritage exhibition "telling the story of timber" in the setting of an old water mill. Some of the features included the workshops of the blacksmith and wheelwright, the mill owner's cottage, numerous working steam and oil engines, Timber at Sea, Timber in the Home, and the Mill Pond Gardens, water from which drove the water wheel. This attraction was closed and all its exhibits removed in 2016.	Inside blackgang sawmill Blackgang Sawmill in 1991
Castle	unknown	1972	A precursor to the Fairy Castle. Simply named as Castle in guidebooks. Located on a 1971 park map as south of Nurseryland and the old entrance. A small square castle with a single cannon inside that looked out of the entrance.	The castle in 1972
Astro glider / Orbiter V	1987	1990	A 28-seater space rocket ship simulator with movement and internal front screen projections. Located near new Adventureland. Depicting a trip from Blackgang around the island then into space and back with a space battle at the end. This included a full running commentary. A 1989 guidebook says it was redeveloped in 1988 a year after opening. Removed due to high running costs and updated health and safety regulations.	Orbiter V
Model Village	1953	1989	Rather than a traditional model village, this was a collection of models of buildings from around the island, including Ryde Pier, Osborne House, and Carisbrooke Castle. The scale varied from model to model. The Village was closed and removed owing to landslips. Photo shows the model of Cowes Castle. The first phase of the model village was removed in May 1989 due to cliff erosion.	Site of the model of osborne house after its removal from the eroding cliff edge. 1984 A survivor of the model village still in the park today
Stocks & Pillory	unknown	2019	A set of stocks and pillory ideal for photo opportunities. Originally located on a 1960s park map as south of the gnomes garden and entrance at that time. Later moved to outside of the crooked house in new adventureland. Finally after an extension to dodo valley they were removed. They have no longer returned to the park.	The stocks and pillory in the 1960s The stocks and pillory in their last location near the crooked house
Tornado	Never opened	2004 (removed)	This was removed after many failed attempts to rectify the ride's structure which did not pass required safety tests.	
Bazaar / Ship Shop /Entrance	1842	1988	Originally the bungalow home of park founder Alexander Dabell. The entrance and bazaar was located in front of the Chine gorge. later extended with round porthole style windows with a footbridge leading off it to the Chine gardens. A brand new purpose-built shop opened in the old bazaar in 1982. Closed in 1985 due to coastal erosion, a new shop and entrance were opened in 1986 in its current location. The old buildings were demolished in the summer of 1989.	The entrance building to the chine 1980 (now removed) the chine entrance in 1974 (now lost to coastal erosion) The walkway path to the old entrance circa 1979
BBC Coast	2010	2015	Exhibition based on the popular BBC Two television series, with interactive features exploring the geology of Blackgang and the surrounding Isle of Wight coastline.	
Bodger the badger & Bronty the brontosaurus.Mr Fox the customs officer.	1990	2018	New mascots were introduced and made special appearances during the main height of season. After a long retirement at the end of the 1990s, both mascots made a one off return on Blackgang Chine's 175th birthday opening day in 2018 for the benefit of the Blackgang Chine memories Facebook group.	Bodger the badger making his final ever appearance 17 March 2018 Bronty the brontosaurus making his final ever appearance 17 March 2018
Shipwreck Collection	unknown	1960s	A collection of various ships cannons, bells, wheels, and other items. Salvaged from local shipwrecks. Lined up along the cliff of the original chine gardens.	1952 The shipwreck collection on the cliff path
Baby Whale Skeleton	1890s	late 1960s	A real life baby whale skeleton. Located outdoors in all weathers. Removed after decades of disintegration by the weather. Not to be confused with the original and still remaining whale skeleton.	
Mill Pond Gardens	1980s	2017	A short walk around the fish ponds and grassed areas to the rear of the blackgang sawmill / World of Timber exhibit. A Romany gypsy caravan, originally sited in nurseryland was added to the mill pond gardens. Last map marked on a 2016 guide.	The entrance to the mill pond gardens
Observatory Platform	1960s	unknown	A tall metal circular observatory tower. Located near smuggler land. Removed after landslips. Now relocated and can be seen and used at former sister park Robin Hill. This may have been a repurposed coastguard lookout platform from the adjacent coastguard cottages near the car park at Blackgang.	
Observatory Platform	unknown	1980s	A white painted metal rectangular observatory located on top of one of the entrance buildings as seen in an old film. Marked on park maps as south of the water gardens. Appears on maps and guidebooks until early 1980s. Removed due to coastal erosion.	Looking towards rocken end from the observatory
Observatory Platform and talking telescope Nursery Land	1990s	2025	As of 2025 the Nursery Land lookout viewpoint platform and talking telescope have been removed due to continual cliff erosion in the area.	Talking Telescope at Nursery Land

== Accidents ==
- In summer 2022, Shipwrecked's hydraulic arm collapsed while the ride was in operation. The park was closed for the rest of the day and the ride was closed during investigations.

== Latest developments ==
In 2010, a new section to the park opened; "Blackgang's Disappearing Village". This was produced in conjunction with the BBC programme Coast, and featured presenter Dick Strawbridge in its video exhibits. It told the story of the island's coast and illustrated the cliff falls and erosion that Blackgang suffered over the years. Approximately half of this exhibition was later removed and converted to the new Hall of Mirrors in 2016. The remaining portion includes the park's original 19-metre-long skeleton of a fin whale, and a simulator designed to mimic the experience of the landslips which occurred at Blackgang.

In 2011, a 'Fairy Land' section was developed adjacent to the Fairy Castle. The following year, the pirate ship play area was redesigned as 'Pirate Cove', with two new pirate ships, and surrounded by other smaller themed buildings, a pirate shooting gallery, and 'The Sailors Return' (now 'The Vortex'), in which visitors walk through a spinning tunnel of lights designed to disorientate.

'Restricted Area 5' opened in 2014; a modernisation of the park's previous 'Dinosaurland'. It features new animatronic dinosaurs which move and roar when visitors approach. Some of the original fibreglass dinosaurs have been retained in the new walkthrough.

In 2015, Cowboy Town was remodelled, with new buildings and scenery. A family of animatronic Triceratops was also added to Restricted Area 5. This replaced the 'Mouth of Hell', a giant devilish 'mouth' that visitors could climb into.

In 2016, The Triassic Club attraction was removed, and the area was redeveloped as a new, larger space for 'The Mouth of Hell', which is now encircled by a new walkway themed with fallen angel statues and demonic sounds.

For the opening of the 2017 'Underwater Kingdom' attraction, the Fantasyland area of the park was completely redeveloped, resulting in the removal of 'The Weather Wizard', 'The Angry Dragon' and 'The Licorice Factory' attractions. The animated 'Smugglers Cave' walkthrough was also removed and a new similar structure was built in its place to form the entrance to the 'Underwater Kingdom'.

As of 2018 and after 56 years, the Water Gardens are no longer part of the park. Demolition of the area began in 2016, with the last of the three remaining ponds nearest the cliff edge being filled in during the winter of 2017.

For the park's 2022 season, two new rides were opened; a drop ride called 'Evolution' and a rotating boat ride named 'Shipwrecked'.

For the park's 2023 season and 180th anniversary a new 18 meter, 360 degree pendulum ride named "Extinction" was opened.

Christmas 2023 saw Blackgang Chine open its doors for the first time ever on selected dates in December. A pop up Christmas shop, complete with tree, decorations and a coffee shop selling Blackgang chine and Christmas themed gifts. The park itself was not open to the public.
