= Joel Morris =

British comedy writer

Joel Morris is a British writer of comedy books, radio, television, and films. He co-created dimwit pundit Philomena Cunk (played by Diane Morgan) for hit shows such as Cunk on Britain, Cunk on Earth and Cunk on Shakespeare for the BBC and Netflix. He has hosted the podcasts Rule of Three and Comfort Blanket, and produced the horror podcast Broken Veil.

== Early life ==
Morris attended King Edward VI Grammar School in Chelmsford, Essex which is where he met his later comedy partner Jazon Hazeley. Whilst at school they produced a parody newsletter, and at sixth form received their first paid work after selling a joke to the Russ Abbott show.

== Career ==
=== Comedy ===
Morris has worked extensively with Jason Hazeley on comedy books, television series, and films. The pair co-wrote a series of Ladybird Books for adults, which parody the style of the company's classic books for children, re-captioning original illustrations from the Ladybird series with new text, offering sardonic commentary on many areas of modern life. The initial run included titles such as The Hangover, Mindfulness, Dating and The Hipster and were published on 18 November 2015. The series was later expanded to include public figures such as Donald Trump. The pair were writers on The Framley Examiner, a local news parody website which later became a book, with Robin Halstead and Alex Morris. Morris and Hazeley also worked on Paddington and television comedy series That Mitchell and Webb Look .

=== Podcasts ===
Hazeley and Morris hosted the comedy discussion podcast Rule of Three until 2020. It was listed among the best podcasts of 2018 by The Guardian, and was named best Arts and Culture Podcast at the 2020 British Podcast Awards.

Morris hosts the podcast Comfort Blanket, interviewing people about albums, films or television shows that they find comforting.

In 2025, Morris released a horror podcast, Broken Veil, with fellow writer Will Maclean. The podcast was entirely independently made, and immediately went on the Apple Podcast's Fiction chart, where it reached number one.

=== Music ===
Morris is lead singer in the band Candidate who released their fourth album in 2004. His harmonies with his brother were compared in The Guardian to Simon & Garfunkel.

== Publications ==
- Halstead, Robin; Hazeley, Jason A.; Morris, Alex; Morris, Joel (2005). Bollocks to Alton Towers: Uncommonly British Days Out. Michael Joseph Ltd. ISBN 0-14-102120-9.
- Halstead, Robin; Hazeley, Jason A.; Morris, Alex; Morris, Joel (3 April 2008). More Bollocks to Alton Towers: More Uncommonly British Days Out. Penguin. ISBN 978-0-14-102785-2.
- Hazeley, Jason A.; Morris, Joel P. (29 October 2015). How it Works: The Husband. Loughborough: Ladybird Books. ISBN 978-0-7181-8356-1.
- ——; —— (29 October 2015). How it Works: The Wife. Loughborough: Ladybird Books. ISBN 978-0-7181-8354-7.
- ——; —— (29 October 2015). The Ladybird Book of Dating. Loughborough: Ladybird Books. ISBN 978-0-7181-8357-8.
- ——; —— (29 October 2015). The Ladybird Book of Mindfulness. Loughborough: Ladybird Books. ISBN 978-0-7181-8352-3.
- ——; —— (29 October 2015). The Ladybird Book of The Hangover. Loughborough: Ladybird Books. ISBN 978-0-7181-8351-6.
- ——; —— (29 October 2015). The Ladybird Book of The Hipster. Loughborough: Ladybird Books. ISBN 978-0-7181-8359-2.
- ——; —— (29 October 2015). The Ladybird Book of The Mid-Life Crisis. Loughborough: Ladybird Books. ISBN 978-0-7181-8353-0.
- ——; —— (29 October 2015). The Ladybird Book of The Shed. Loughborough: Ladybird Books. ISBN 978-0-7181-8358-5.
- ——; —— (11 February 2016). How it Works: The Mum. Loughborough: Ladybird Books. ISBN 978-0-7181-8421-6.
- ——; —— (19 May 2016). How it Works: The Dad. Loughborough: Ladybird Books. ISBN 978-0-7181-8426-1.
- ——; —— (25 August 2016). How it Works: The Student. Loughborough: Ladybird Books. ISBN 978-0-7181-8428-5.
- ——; —— (20 October 2016). How it Works: The Cat. Loughborough: Ladybird Books. ISBN 978-0-7181-8433-9.
- ——; —— (20 October 2016). How it Works: The Dog. Loughborough: Ladybird Books. ISBN 978-0-7181-8435-3.
- ——; —— (20 October 2016). How it Works: The Grandparent. Loughborough: Ladybird Books. ISBN 978-0-7181-8430-8.
- ——; —— (20 October 2016). The Ladybird Book of Red Tape. Loughborough: Ladybird Books. ISBN 978-0-7181-8439-1.
- ——; —— (20 October 2016). The Ladybird Book of The Meeting. Loughborough: Ladybird Books. ISBN 978-0-7181-8437-7.
- ——; —— (20 October 2016). The Ladybird Book of The People Next Door. Loughborough: Ladybird Books. ISBN 978-0-7181-8441-4.
- ——; —— (20 October 2016). The Ladybird Book of The Sickie. Loughborough: Ladybird Books. ISBN 978-0-7181-8443-8.
- ——; —— (20 October 2016). The Ladybird Book of The Zombie Apocalypse. Loughborough: Ladybird Books. ISBN 978-0-7181-8445-2.
- ——; —— (1 December 2016). The Ladybird Book of Boxing Day. Loughborough: Ladybird Books. ISBN 978-0-7181-8486-5.
- ——; —— (23 February 2017). The Ladybird Book of The Do-Gooder. Loughborough: Ladybird Books. ISBN 978-0-7181-8447-6.
- ——; —— (5 October 2017). How it Works: The Baby. Loughborough: Ladybird Books. ISBN 978-0-7181-8863-4.
- ——; —— (5 October 2017). How it Works: The Brother. Loughborough: Ladybird Books. ISBN 978-0-7181-8869-6.
- ——; —— (5 October 2017). How it Works: The Sister. Loughborough: Ladybird Books. ISBN 978-0-7181-8870-2.
- ——; —— (5 October 2017). People at Work: The Rock Star. Loughborough: Ladybird Books. ISBN 978-0-7181-8865-8.
- ——; —— (5 October 2017). The Ladybird Book of Balls. Loughborough: Ladybird Books. ISBN 978-0-7181-8871-9.
- ——; —— (5 October 2017). The Ladybird Book of The Big Night Out. Loughborough: Ladybird Books. ISBN 978-0-7181-8867-2.
- ——; —— (5 October 2017). The Ladybird Book of The Ex. Loughborough: Ladybird Books. ISBN 978-0-7181-8866-5.
- ——; —— (5 October 2017). The Ladybird Book of The Nerd. Loughborough: Ladybird Books. ISBN 978-0-7181-8864-1.
- ——; —— (5 October 2017). The Ladybird Book of The New You. Loughborough: Ladybird Books. ISBN 978-0-7181-8885-6.
- ——; —— (5 October 2017). The Ladybird Book of The Quiet Night In. Loughborough: Ladybird Books. ISBN 978-0-7181-8868-9.
- ——; —— (5 October 2017). A Ladybird First Grown-Up Picture Book. Loughborough: Ladybird Books. ISBN 978-0-7181-8884-9.
- ——; —— (25 October 2018). The Story of Brexit. Loughborough: Ladybird Books. ISBN 978-0-241-38656-9.
- ——; —— (15 November 2018). The Wonderful World of Ladybird Books for Grown-Ups. London: Ladybird Books. ISBN 978-0-241-36404-8.
- ——; —— (3 October 2019). A Ladybird Book about Donald Trump. Loughborough: Ladybird Books. ISBN 978-0-241-42272-4.
