= Goodbye (Ben & Jason album) =

Ben & Jason album

Studio album by Ben & Jason
- Released: 13 October 2003
- Length: 36:30
- Label: Setanta

Ben & Jason chronology
Ten Songs About You (2001)	Goodbye (2003)

Professional ratings
Review scores
Source	Rating
Allmusic	link

Goodbye is the fourth and final album by British singer-songwriter duo Ben & Jason. It was released on 13 October 2003 on the independent label Setanta.

== Track listing ==
1. "Mr. America" – 4:02
2. "A Star in Nobody's Picture" – 4:23
3. "You're the Reason" – 3:22
4. "Hollywood (The Story of a Domestic Explosion)" – 3:33
5. "$10 Miracle" – 4:13
6. "Orphans" – 3:37
7. "Sail on Heaven's Seas" – 4:35
8. "Window In / Window Out" – 5:20
9. "When to Laugh" – 3:28

Japanese edition bonus tracks

10. "Another Giant Step" – 2:58
11. "Air Guitar (Home Recording)" – 3:31
