= Shirley Thompson (composer) =

English composer, conductor and violinist

Shirley Thompson OBE
- Born: Shirley Joy Thompson; London, England
- Citizenship: British
- Education: Liverpool University; Goldsmiths' College
- Occupations: Composer; conductor; violinist; academic
- Notable work: New Nation Rising, A 21st Century Symphony
- Awards: Top TV Music Theme (1990) for South of the Border; Mannheim Film Festival prize (1990) for Dreaming Rivers
- Website: shirleythompsonmusic.com

External videos
- "Storytelling with the Power of Music – A 21st Century Symphony", Shirley J. Thompson at TEDxJamaica

Shirley Joy Thompson OBE (born 7 January 1958) is an English composer, conductor, and violinist of Jamaican descent. Her output as a composer encompasses symphonies, ballets, operas, concertos, and other works for ensembles, as well as music for TV, film, and theatre. Her New Nation Rising, A 21st Century Symphony was composed in 2002 and debuted in 2004. Also an academic, she is currently Professor of Music at the University of Westminster. In the 2019 New Year Honours she was appointed an Officer of the Order of the British Empire (OBE) for services to Music.

== Early years and education ==
Shirley Thompson was born in London, UK, of Jamaican parents. Her early musical experience included playing the violin in various youth symphony orchestras in London, and choral singing with local choirs in Newham. She graduated in music from Liverpool University and in composition from Goldsmiths' College after studying with Professor Stanley Glasser.

== Career ==
After university, Thompson composed a body of solo and instrumental ensemble works for concert hall as well as working as a freelance composer of music for TV, films, and the theatre. She set up the Shirley Thompson Ensemble in 1994 and this became the main vehicle for her instrumental and vocal works that fused contemporary classical orchestrations with popular and world music styles.

Having trained as a television programme maker at the BBC and Carlton Television, Thompson directed the film Memories in Mind, with an award from the Arts Council, which was broadcast by the BBC in 1998.

Thompson began to focus on full orchestral composition with New Nation Rising, A 21st Century Symphony, first performed in 2004 and recorded by the Royal Philharmonic Orchestra to celebrate one thousand years of London's history. The piece sees the Royal Philharmonic Orchestra play alongside two choirs, solo singers, a rapper and dhol drummers. Originally commissioned for the Golden Jubilee of Elizabeth II in 2002, the concept has been described as "a predecessor of the 2012 Olympics Opening Ceremony".

Alongside Andy Cowton and Carlos Montoya, Thompson co-scored the award-winning ballet PUSH, which premiered in 2005 and has since toured the world in major and prestigious venues, among them: Sadler's Wells, the London Coliseum, New York City Center and the Sydney Opera House. Theater Heilbronn, Germany; Athens Arena, Greece; Opéra de Lyon, Théâtre des Champs-Élysées, France; Teatro Comunale Modena (Modena), Teatro degli Arcimboldi (Milan), and Teatro di San Carlo (Naples), Italy; Teatro Real, Madrid, Spain; and Mariinsky Theatre, St Petersburg, Russia.

In 2007, Thompson was commissioned to compose music for the opening of the Parliamentary exhibition The British Slave Trade: Abolition, Parliament and People, which marked the 250-year anniversary of legislation for the abolition of the transatlantic trade in enslaved African people. The Woman Who Refused to Dance, performed at the launch, is arranged for soprano, spoken-word artist and orchestra. Spirit of the Middle Passage for three solo singers, spoken-word artist and chamber orchestra was performed by The Philharmonia Orchestra in the Queen Elizabeth Hall as part of the Freedom & Culture International Creative Forum. The work featured three heroines: Nanny of the Maroons, Dido Elizabeth Belle, and The Woman Who Refused To Dance (on a ship with enslaved Africans).

In 2009, Thompson was commissioned by Southbank Centre to compose a piece to commemorate 100 days of Barack Obama's presidency. Voice of Change for chamber orchestra, solo voices, speaker and video was performed in April 2009 at the Purcell Room, Southbank Centre, with performers including principals of the BBC Concert Orchestra and soloists.

In 2010, Thompson was announced in the Powerlist of Britain's 100 Most Influential Black People 2010, an accolade that would be repeated in subsequent years, including being listed in the Top 10 for 2018. Most recently, Thompson has also been included in the 2019, 2020, 2021 and 2022 editions of the list for her continued contribution to music.

On 9 February 2013, extracts from her work Mandela Tales, inspired by the book Nelson Mandela's Favourite African Folk Tales (2002), were included in the programme performed by the Chamber Orchestra and Chamber Choir from Gordonstoun School at the amphitheatre at the V&A Waterfront, Cape Town.

In 2015, her opera Sacred Mountain: Incidents in the Life of Queen Nanny of the Maroons was chosen to open London's Tête à Tête: The Opera Festival.

In April 2016, she was honoured with the Luminary Award (presented to people of Caribbean heritage who have made significant, outstanding contributions on an international scale or have brought to prominence issues that affect the Caribbean region, with previous recipients including Bob Marley, Harry Belafonte, Jimmy Cliff, Louise Bennett and Derek Walcott) at the University of the West Indies (UWI) Benefit Gala in Toronto, Canada.

In 2018, to mark the 70th anniversary of the landing of the HMT Empire Windrush, the ship that brought one of the first large groups of post-war West Indian immigrants to the United Kingdom, Thompson was commissioned to compose a new anthem, entitled "Psalm to Windrush: for the Brave and Ingenious", which was performed at a special service of thanksgiving held at Westminster Abbey.

On 9 June 2021, her work Song of the Prophets: A Requiem for the Climate premiered in a virtual concert performance as part of a collaboration between Chineke! Orchestra and UK charity Christian Aid to highlight the global impact of climate change.

Also in 2021, Thompson's Emanation, a seven-minute work for chamber ensemble, commissioned by Allianz Musical Insurance and composed for BSO Resound, "the world's first professional disabled-led ensemble embedded in a major symphony orchestra", had its world premiere on 17 June at Lighthouse, Poole.

Thompson composed the anthem for the UEFA Women's Euro 2022, entitled "Beautiful Game", which was recorded by the Royal Philharmonic Orchestra with community singers.

In 2023, she was announced as one of 12 composers who would each create a brand new piece for the Coronation of Charles III and Camilla, "personally commissioned" by the King.

=== Academic work ===
Thompson is Professor of Music at the University of Westminster, where she has taught since 2001, having held the position of Reader and Head of Composition and Performance. She has also given lectures at other institutions, including the Victoria & Albert Museum and on BBC Radio 3.

=== Filmography ===
Thompson was interviewed as part of the BBC mockumentary series Cunk on Earth.

== Honours and awards ==
Thompson has received awards from the following organisations:

- Arts Council of England
- Southbank Centre Award (2005), for PUSH
- Newham Council, Department of Culture
- Top TV Music Theme (1990) for South of the Border
- Mannheim Film Festival prize (1990) for Dreaming Rivers
- Prized Pieces, for Memories in Mind (1992)
- Woman of the Year in the Arts nomination (1997)
- Powerlist of Britain's 100 Most Influential Black People (2010–22)
- Chancellor's Award, University of Westminster (2016/17)
- University of the West Indies (UWI) Luminary Award (2016)
- DLitt honorary degree from UWI (2018)
- Appointed Officer of the Order of the British Empire (OBE) for services to Music (2019 New Year Honours)
- Coronation Medal, 2023

== Works ==
Thompson has composed for opera, orchestra, contemporary dance, TV and film. Selected works include:

- New Nation Rising, A 21st Century Symphony (2004) – symphony for orchestra, choir, solo singers, rapper and dhol drummers
- Push – contemporary ballet (co-scored)
- The Woman Who Refused to Dance (2007) – for solo singer, speaker and orchestra
- Spirit of the Middle Passage – for solo singers, speaker and orchestra
- Viola Concerto, Oslo Odyssey – for orchestral and electronic instruments and multi-media
- 100 Days of Barack Obama – for solo voice, instrumental ensemble and video projection
- The Lodger – theatrical music
- A Child of the Jago – opera
- Tapestry Song Cycle – for soprano and instrumental ensemble

Thompson's works have been recorded and issued on CD and DVD, including:

- New Nation Rising – A 21st Century Symphony
- Newham Symphony Spectacular
- Transition
- Summer Notes
- Anansi Fantasia
- Memories in Mind
