= Pat & Cabbage =

- Genre: Sitcom
- Written by: Beth Chalmers; Amy Shindler
- Directed by: Syd Macartney
- Starring: Barbara Flynn; Cherie Lunghi
- Composer: Oli Julian
- Country of origin: United Kingdom
- Original language: English
- No. of series: 1
- No. of episodes: 6

Production
- Executive producers: Tom Sherry; Nicola Shindler
- Producer: Richard Webb
- Running time: 30 minutes (including breaks)
- Production company: Red Production Company

Original release
- Network: ITV
- Release: 5 September – 10 October 2013

Pat & Cabbage is a short-lived British sitcom written by Amy Shindler and Beth Chalmers, which first aired in 2013 on ITV. It stars Barbara Flynn and Cherie Lunghi. The series centres on two newly single women who have no intention of growing old gracefully – much to the annoyance of their children. Series one was six episodes long, and premiered on Thursday 5 September and ended on 10 October 2013 on ITV.

== Main cast ==
- Barbara Flynn – Pat

Pat is a widow, who is now ready to have some fun with her single life, along with fellow singleton and best friend, Cabbage. She has a fun personality and a cheeky attitude, despite the fact life keeps throwing obstacles in her (and Cabbages) way. She has two daughters- Helen, the eldest, is driven by her family, whilst Nicola, the youngest, is more driven by her career.

- Cherie Lunghi – Cabbage (Jean)

Cabbage is a newly divorced after her husband left her for a younger woman, meaning she finds herself single for the first time in decades. Cabbage's only child, Dylan, is her pride and joy; she still does everything for him even though he is in his forties.

- Rosie Cavaliero – Helen

Helen is Pat's eldest daughter, who is married to Jim and the mother of Jack. Helen believes that retraining as a therapist will give her a unique perspective on the personal lives of those around her.

- Marcus Garvey – Jim

Jim is the son-in-law of Pat, who is married to Helen and the father of Jack. Jim is a very creative character, who will try any venture to be a success. His never-ending optimism creates fun and sometimes chaos.

- Diane Morgan – Nicola

Nicola is the younger daughter of Pat. Despite Pat worrying that she may have left it "too late", Nicola believes that her career as a teacher is more important. She enjoys affectionately taking the mick out of Dylan, with whom she shares some common ground.

- Tom Turner – Dylan

Dylan is the only child of Cabbage and is her pride and joy. His mother enables him to live in an environment in which he has to do nothing, including paying rent.

- Luca Fereday/Raffi Fereday – Jack

Jack is the three-year-old son of Helen and Jim. Currently, he is Pat's only grandchild.

== Supporting cast ==
- Laura Solon – Ida

Ida is Dylan's girlfriend, who is a pathologist.

- Thomas Nelstrop – Toby

Toby is a fellow teacher at Nicola's school whom she is having an affair with. Nicola is upset when Pat tells her that she saw Toby with an underage girl.

- Peter Davison – Michael

Michael is a fellow grandparent who meets Pat on a school run. Cabbage attempts to set them up on a date.

== Episodes ==
No.	Title	Directed by	Written by	Original release date	UK viewers (millions)
1	"Episode 1"	Syd Macartney	Beth Chalmers and Amy Shindler	5 September 2013	3.20
Sixty-something Pat is a recent widow, whose grown-up daughters, married counsellor Helen and singleton Nicola, disapprove of her friendship with the free-spirited divorcee nicknamed Cabbage. After Pat has met fellow grandparent Michael on the school run, Cabbage determines to set them up on a date, much to a reluctant Pat's embarrassment. Meanwhile Helen gives Nicola a hamster, which escapes into the back of Pat's car. Cabbage takes Pat to take a secret look at Michael's house but the hamster jumps onto Pat's shoulder, making her crash into Michael's daughter's car.
2	"Episode 2"	Syd Macartney	Beth Chalmers and Amy Shindler	12 September 2013	2.77
Armed with fake CVs provided by Cabbage, Pat decides to go back to work but is side-tracked by grandson Jack's Baboon Break-out computer game, prompting Cabbage to encourage her to apply to work in a video game shop. After Jack's birthday party - where Cabbage, a name she took as a model in the 1960s, accidentally destroys the bouncy castle - the two women go by bus for Pat's job interview but never make it, as they go past their stop when Pat, to a round of applause from the other passengers, ticks off a threatening youth. Meanwhile Pat and Cabbage try unsuccessfully to pair up Nicola, who is conducting a secret affair with fellow teacher Toby, with Cabbage's son, musician Dylan, whose girlfriend Ida is a weird pathologist.
3	"Episode 3"	Syd Macartney	Beth Chalmers and Amy Shindler	19 September 2013	<2.54
Pat and Cabbage join a butchery class to meet eligible men but the only one fanciable is Terry, the teacher, and Pat is soon fighting rival Judy for his attention, leading to a tussle which sends a leg of beef flying through a window into the car park. The family prepares to attend an annual memorial for Pat's husband but Cabbage has taken her to a cut-price wine tasting instead. The daughters are appalled but Pat explains that she must be left alone to lead her own life now that she is a widow.
4	"Episode 4"	Syd Macartney	Beth Chalmers and Amy Shindler	26 September 2013	<2.47
Leaving Helen to argue with Jim and Nicola to wait for a call from Toby, Pat and Cabbage attend the hen night of Dylan's ex-girlfriend Katrina, where they catch Toby in the arms of an apparently under-age girl. Nicola does not believe Pat when she rings to tell her but dumps Toby again anyway. Learning that Katrina has a child, Cabbage is excited to think that Dylan could be the father but in fact the conception was via a sperm donor and Katrina takes out a restraining order against Pat and Cabbage. At least Pat gets to have another pleasant meeting with Michael.
5	"Episode 5"	Syd Macartney	Beth Chalmers and Amy Shindler	3 October 2013	<2.72
Pat and Cabbage go for a weekend break at a country cottage owned by Cabbage's mother Ruby but are surprised to see a nearly nude Dylan, who is entertaining Ida there for her birthday. Cabbage cooks Ida a birthday meal, which is rebuffed as Ida is a vegetarian and Ruby has to stop her digging in her vegetable patch. Nicola also arrives, having fled a wedding where Helen and Jim are trying to match-make her. They also turn up, causing Ida to leave and the two families go for a country walk, getting lost and having to be rescued by Ida. Pat does however get a call from Michael, requesting a date.
6	"Episode 6"	Syd Macartney	Beth Chalmers and Amy Shindler	10 October 2013	<2.79
Pat and Cabbage visit a mystic woman who predicts a great future for Pat but only says "Hummus" to Cabbage. Bumping into her ex-husband Tom, and his younger partner Clare, Cabbage invites them and Pat's family for a meal but is less than pleased to learn that Clare is expecting Tom's baby. When Jim's attempts at culinary skill cause a kitchen fire, Cabbage takes delight in soaking Tom and Clare whilst putting out the flames. Nicola brings new boyfriend Steve, who wants her to join him in the army and go to Afghanistan. This causes a row with pacifist Dylan but he does end up kissing Nicola - before driving off to see Ida. At least Pat gets a firm date with Michael, confirming that the mystic's prediction was true.

== Ratings ==
The first episode was watched by 3.20 million viewers and was ranked the 20th most watched programme on ITV of the week. The second episode was watched by 2.77 million viewers and was ranked the 29th most watched programme on ITV of the week. The other 4 episodes were not ranked in the top 30, so their total viewers are not as precise.
