= Bollocks to Alton Towers =

Travel book by Robin Halstead

- Author: Robin Halstead; Jason Hazeley; Alex Morris; Joel Morris
- Language: English
- Genre: Travel book
- Publisher: Michael Joseph Ltd; Penguin Books
- Publication date: 2005
- Publication place: United Kingdom
- ISBN: 0-14-102120-9

Bollocks to Alton Towers: Uncommonly British Days Out (ISBN 0-14-102120-9) is a humorous travel book written by Robin Halstead, Jason Hazeley, Alex Morris, and Joel Morris (the creators of The Framley Examiner), which showcases unusual attractions, left-field museums and one-off days out in the United Kingdom.

The introduction describes the book as "a collection of the underdogs of British tourism... [that] say more about Britain and the British than any number of corkscrew thrill rides or high-tech Interactive Visitor Experiences."

The book was published in hardback by Michael Joseph Ltd (an imprint of the Penguin Group) in 2005. It was also published in paperback by Penguin Books in 2006. The book received favourable reviews from The Times, The Press, and The Daily Telegraph.

The theme park Alton Towers mentioned in the title responded by offering free entry in May 2005 to anyone who arrived with a garden gnome.

A sequel, titled Far From the Sodding Crowd, was published in hardback in 2007. A paperback edition, More Bollocks to Alton Towers, (ISBN 0-14-102785-1) was published in April 2008. A short documentary, also titled Far From the Sodding Crowd, was made in 2009 and features some of the attractions included in both books, as well as writers Jason Hazeley and Joel Morris.

== Contents ==
Attractions covered in the book:

- Blackgang Chine, Isle of Wight
- British Lawnmower Museum, Southport
- Peasholm Park Naval Warfare, Scarborough
- Louis Tussaud's House of Wax, Great Yarmouth (closed in 2013)
- Kelvedon Hatch Secret Nuclear Bunker, Essex
- Porteath Bee Centre, Cornwall (closed)
- Mad Jack's Sugar Loaf, East Sussex
- Keith and Dufftown Railway, Moray, Scotland
- The EastEnders Set, BBC Elstree Centre, Hertfordshire
- Pitt Rivers Museum, Oxford
- Eden Ostrich World, Penrith (closed around 2011)
- Keith Harding's World of Mechanical Music, Northleach, Gloucestershire (closed)
- Shah Jahan Mosque, Woking
- The Beckham Trail, London Borough of Waltham Forest
- Mother Shipton's Cave and Dripping Well, Knaresborough, North Yorkshire
- Apollo Pavilion, Peterlee, County Durham
- Hamilton Toy Collection, Callander, Stirling
- Imber, Wiltshire
- Cumberland Pencil Museum, Keswick
- Pack o' Cards Inn, Combe Martin, Devon
- Diggerland, Strood, Kent
- Orford Ness, Suffolk
- Wellcome Collection, Science Museum, London
- Cast Courts, Victoria and Albert Museum, London
- Tebay Services, Cumbria
- The Williamson Tunnels, Liverpool
- Barometer World, Devon (closed as of 2022)
- Portmeirion, Gwynedd, North Wales
- Edinburgh Camera Obscura
- Crystal Palace Dinosaurs, London
- House of Marbles, Bovey Tracey, Devon
- Dennis Severs' House, London
- Bletchley Park, Buckinghamshire
- "Ripon Tramp Museum" — actually The Workhouse Museum, Ripon, North Yorkshire
- Llanfairpwllgwyngyllgogerychwyrndrobwllllantysiliogogogoch, Anglesey, Wales
- South Bridge Vaults, Edinburgh
- Gnome Magic, Dedham, Colchester, Essex
- A la Ronde, Lympstone, Devon
- Port Sunlight, Wirral
- Morpeth Bagpipe Museum, Northumberland
- Bekonscot Model Village, Beaconsfield, Buckinghamshire
- Avebury Stone Circle, Wiltshire
- Christ's House, Bedford
