= Porteath =

Coordinates: 50.261°N 5.289°W

- Location within Cornwall
- OS grid reference: SW657453
- Civil parish: St Minver
- Unitary authority: Cornwall
- Ceremonial county: Cornwall
- Region: South West
- Country: England
- Sovereign state: United Kingdom

Porteath is a hamlet in the parish of St Minver, Cornwall, England.
