= Freshers (British TV series) =

- Genre: Documentary
- Directed by: Naomi Carter
- Narrated by: Diane Morgan
- Country of origin: United Kingdom
- Original language: English
- No. of seasons: 2
- No. of episodes: 8

Production
- Executive producers: Tayte Simpson; David Vallance
- Producer: Meg Barnard
- Production location: United Kingdom
- Editor: Dave Moon
- Running time: 46 minutes
- Production company: Mentorn Media

Original release
- Network: ITV2
- Release: 16 October 2013

Freshers is a British reality documentary series that airs on ITV2. The series follows a group of freshers in their early days at university, showing how they adapt to life away from home, exploring how they make friends and study. The first series was filmed in 2013 at the University of Bedfordshire and its success led ITV to renew it for a second series. The follow-up series was filmed at Swansea University in Wales at the start of the 2014–15 academic year.
