= Workhouse Museum =

Museum in Ripon, North Yorkshire, England

Coordinates: 54°08′18″N 1°31′20″W

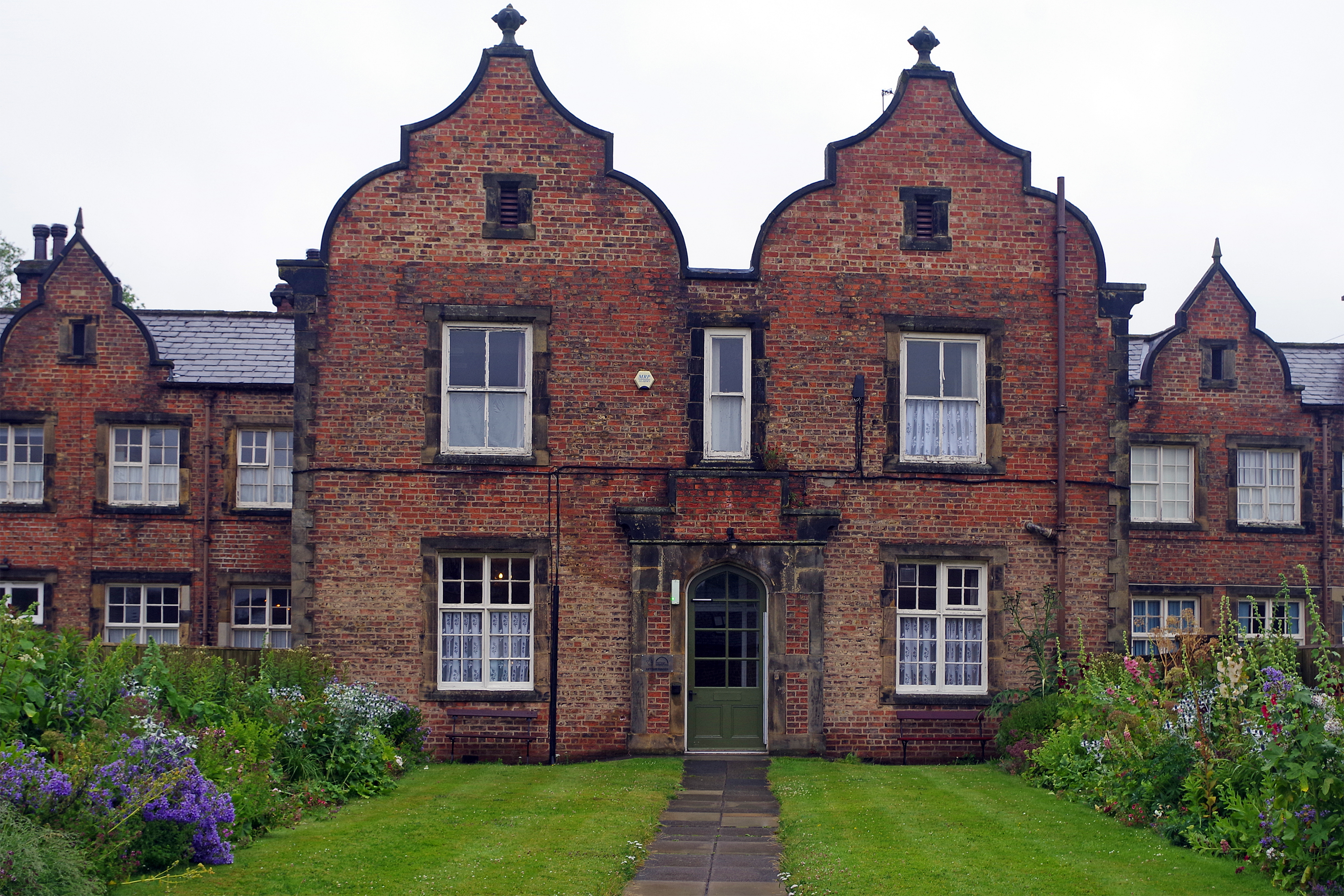
The former workhouse, in 2024

The Workhouse Museum is a museum in Ripon, a city in North Yorkshire, in England.

In 1776, William Aislabie donated a house known as "Old Hall" for the use of the poor of Ripon. It was demolished and a new workhouse constructed on the site in 1855. In 1877, a block for vagrants was added. In 1953, it was renamed Sharow View, and remained open until 1974. The building was then used as offices for the North Yorkshire Social Services and Probation Services departments. In 1996, Ripon Museums Trust converted the gatehouse into a museum. It restored and opened the garden to the public in 2010, and then in 2017 acquired the main block of the workhouse, more than doubling the size of the museum. The main block and gatehouse are both grade II listed buildings.

The main block is built of brown brick, with stone dressings, quoins, and a slate roof with coped gables on cut kneelers. There are two storeys and eleven bays, the middle three bays projecting under two shaped gables with finials. The flanking wings each has one smaller shaped gable with a smaller finial. The central doorway has a four-centred arched head and a projecting surround. The windows are a mix of sashes and casements.

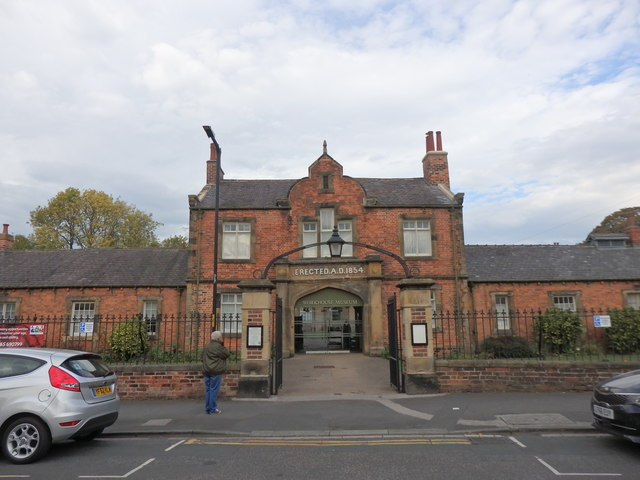
The gatehouse, in 2018

The gatehouse is built of red brick with stone dressings, quoins, a moulded string course, and a slate roof with coped gables. There are two storeys and three bays. In the centre is a carriage entry with a four-centred arch flanked by buttresses, above which is an inscribed and dated parapet. Over this is a three-light stepped mullioned window and a shaped gable. The other windows are casements. The main block is flanked by single-storey three-bay wings, the right wing extending towards the road.

== See also ==
- Listed buildings in Ripon
