= Cunk on Britain =

2018 British mockumentary television series

- Genre: Comedy; Mockumentary
- Created by: Charlie Brooker
- Written by: Charlie Brooker; Jason Hazeley; Joel Morris; Ben Caudell
- Directed by: Lorry Powles
- Starring: Diane Morgan
- Country of origin: United Kingdom
- Original language: English
- No. of seasons: 1
- No. of episodes: 5

Production
- Executive producers: Annabel Jones; Alex Moody; Charlie Brooker
- Producer: Matt Hulme
- Cinematography: Jon Kassell
- Editor: Damon Tai
- Production company: House of Tomorrow

Original release
- Network: BBC Two
- Release: 3 April – 1 May 2018

Related
- Cunk on Earth

Cunk on Britain is a British mockumentary television series created by Charlie Brooker starring Diane Morgan as the title character Philomena Cunk, an ill-informed investigative reporter, who originated on Charlie Brooker's Weekly Wipe including the 2016 specials Cunk on Shakespeare and Cunk on Christmas. It premiered on BBC Two on 3 April 2018, and concluded on 1 May 2018, after one season of five episodes. It was followed up in 2022 by a similar series, Cunk on Earth.

== Plot ==
Philomena Cunk, an ill-informed and rather dim investigative reporter, retells British history through a series of montages and interviews with experts which feature odd or ridiculous questions. The show featured guest appearances from real-life experts, including Robert Peston, Neil Oliver, Howard Goodall, Tom Holland and Ronald Hutton.

== Episodes ==
No.	Title	Original release date
1	"Beginnings"	3 April 2018
2	"The Empire Strikes Back"	10 April 2018
3	"The Third Episode"	17 April 2018
4	"Twentieth Century Shocks"	24 April 2018
5	"The Arse End of History"	1 May 2018

== Cast ==
- Diane Morgan as Philomena Cunk

== Production ==
Principal photography took place in September and October 2017 in Britain and the series began airing on 3 April 2018.

== Reception ==
The Guardian's Rebecca Nicholson notes, "It’s Cunk’s interviewing style that is the highlight and potentially one of its weaknesses. Chucking questions that make no sense at experts was a success on Screenwipe, and it works particularly well with British history academics, whose politeness and patience only exacerbates the absurdity." New Statesman's Anna Leszkiewicz states, "The success of Cunk as a character is not thanks to her general persona as an ill-informed pundit, but her bizarre turns of phrase."
