= Jason Hazeley =

British comedy writer

Jason Hazeley is a British comedy writer. With long-time writing partner Joel Morris, Hazeley has written many books, and for many British comedy series, and films. Their work includes a collection of parody Ladybird books, and they have written scripts for many British comedy series and films, including That Mitchell and Webb Look, Charlie Brooker's Screenwipe and the Paddington films.

== Early life ==
Hazeley, whilst known as Jason Smith, attended King Edward VI Grammar School in Chelmsford, Essex which is where he met his later comedy partner Joel Morris. Whilst at school they produced a parody newsletter, and at sixth form received their first paid work after selling a joke to the Russ Abbot show.

== Career ==
=== Television and film ===
Hazeley has written for a number of British TV shows and films. These include That Mitchell and Webb Look, A Touch of Cloth, Charlie Brooker's Screenwipe, Electionwipe and Newswipe programmes, and several Philomena Cunk series. The pair are regular contributors to the British adult comic Viz. The 2016 Electionwipe won the BAFTA award for best Comedy and entertainment programme. They also wrote for Paddington (film) and Paddington 2.

=== Books ===
With Joel Morris, Hazeley has co-written books including Bollocks to Alton Towers, and a series of parody Ladybird books which re-caption original illustrations from the Ladybird series with jokes aimed at an adult audience. Topics have included Donald Trump, hipsters and hangovers and Brexit. The books were so successful that in 2015 only JK Rowling, David Walliams and Julia Donaldson sold more copies in the UK.

Hazeley wrote The Framley Examiner, a local news parody website which later became a book, with Robin Halstead, Alex Morris and Joel Morris.

=== Podcast ===
Hazeley and Morris also hosted the comedy podcast Rule of Three until 2020. Rule of Three was named in the best podcasts of 2018 by The Guardian. On the show they invite a comedy performer on to discuss their career and a comedy performance or programme, a TV show, a film, a book, an album or a comic that means a lot to them. Guests have included Eddie Izzard, John Finnemore, Danielle Ward, Jon Holmes, and Aisling Bea Topics have included Bill Hicks, films such as Trading Places and Time Bandits and the LP version of The Album of the Soundtrack of the Trailer of the Film of Monty Python and the Holy Grail. The podcast has branched out into live shows with special guests such as Sue Perkins. Hazeley has also appeared as a guest on the Griefcast podcast with Cariad Lloyd. At the 2020 British Podcast Awards it was named best Arts and Culture Podcast.

=== Music ===
From 1998 to 2003 Hazeley was part of the folk-pop duo Ben & Jason. In 2024, he toured the UK as part of Beth Gibbons' live band, and appeared with her on Later... with Jools Holland.

== Publications ==
- Hazeley, Jason A.; Morris, Joel P. (29 October 2015). How it Works: The Husband. Loughborough: Ladybird Books. ISBN 978-0-7181-8356-1.
- ——; —— (29 October 2015). The Ladybird Book of Dating. Loughborough: Ladybird Books. ISBN 978-0-7181-8357-8.
- ——; —— (29 October 2015). How it Works: The Wife. Loughborough: Ladybird Books. ISBN 978-0-7181-8354-7.
- ——; —— (29 October 2015). The Ladybird Book of Dating. Loughborough: Ladybird Books. ISBN 978-0-7181-8357-8.
- ——; —— (29 October 2015). The Ladybird Book of Mindfulness. Loughborough: Ladybird Books. ISBN 978-0-7181-8352-3.
- ——; —— (29 October 2015). The Ladybird Book of The Hangover. Loughborough: Ladybird Books. ISBN 978-0-7181-8351-6.
- ——; —— (29 October 2015). The Ladybird Book of The Hipster. Loughborough: Ladybird Books. ISBN 978-0-7181-8359-2.
- ——; —— (29 October 2015). The Ladybird Book of The Mid-Life Crisis. Loughborough: Ladybird Books. ISBN 978-0-7181-8353-0.
- ——; —— (29 October 2015). The Ladybird Book of The Shed. Loughborough: Ladybird Books. ISBN 978-0-7181-8358-5.
- ——; —— (11 February 2016). How it Works: The Mum. Loughborough: Ladybird Books. ISBN 978-0-7181-8421-6.
- ——; —— (19 May 2016). How it Works: The Dad. Loughborough: Ladybird Books. ISBN 978-0-7181-8426-1.
- ——; —— (25 August 2016). How it Works: The Student. Loughborough: Ladybird Books. ISBN 978-0-7181-8428-5.
- ——; —— (20 October 2016). How it Works: The Cat. Loughborough: Ladybird Books. ISBN 978-0-7181-8433-9.
- ——; —— (20 October 2016). How it Works: The Dog. Loughborough: Ladybird Books. ISBN 978-0-7181-8435-3.
- ——; —— (20 October 2016). How it Works: The Grandparent. Loughborough: Ladybird Books. ISBN 978-0-7181-8430-8.
- ——; —— (20 October 2016). The Ladybird Book of Red Tape. Loughborough: Ladybird Books. ISBN 978-0-7181-8439-1.
- ——; —— (20 October 2016). The Ladybird Book of The Meeting. Loughborough: Ladybird Books. ISBN 978-0-7181-8437-7.
- ——; —— (20 October 2016). The Ladybird Book of The People Next Door. Loughborough: Ladybird Books. ISBN 978-0-7181-8441-4.
- ——; —— (20 October 2016). The Ladybird Book of The Sickie. Loughborough: Ladybird Books. ISBN 978-0-7181-8443-8.
- ——; —— (20 October 2016). The Ladybird Book of The Zombie Apocalypse. Loughborough: Ladybird Books. ISBN 978-0-7181-8445-2.
- ——; —— (1 December 2016). The Ladybird Book of Boxing Day. Loughborough: Ladybird Books. ISBN 978-0-7181-8486-5.
- ——; —— (23 February 2017). The Ladybird Book of The Do-Gooder. Loughborough: Ladybird Books. ISBN 978-0-7181-8447-6.
- ——; —— (5 October 2017). How it Works: The Baby. Loughborough: Ladybird Books. ISBN 978-0-7181-8863-4.
- ——; —— (5 October 2017). How it Works: The Brother. Loughborough: Ladybird Books. ISBN 978-0-7181-8869-6.
- ——; —— (5 October 2017). How it Works: The Sister. Loughborough: Ladybird Books. ISBN 978-0-7181-8870-2.
- ——; —— (5 October 2017). People at Work: The Rock Star. Loughborough: Ladybird Books. ISBN 978-0-7181-8865-8.
- ——; —— (5 October 2017). The Ladybird Book of Balls. Loughborough: Ladybird Books. ISBN 978-0-7181-8871-9.
- ——; —— (5 October 2017). The Ladybird Book of The Big Night Out. Loughborough: Ladybird Books. ISBN 978-0-7181-8867-2.
- ——; —— (5 October 2017). The Ladybird Book of The Ex. Loughborough: Ladybird Books. ISBN 978-0-7181-8866-5.
- ——; —— (5 October 2017). The Ladybird Book of The Nerd. Loughborough: Ladybird Books. ISBN 978-0-7181-8864-1.
- ——; —— (5 October 2017). The Ladybird Book of The New You. Loughborough: Ladybird Books. ISBN 978-0-7181-8885-6.
- ——; —— (5 October 2017). The Ladybird Book of The Quiet Night In. Loughborough: Ladybird Books. ISBN 978-0-7181-8868-9.
- ——; —— (5 October 2017). A Ladybird First Grown-Up Picture Book. Loughborough: Ladybird Books. ISBN 978-0-7181-8884-9.
- ——; —— (25 October 2018). The Story of Brexit. Loughborough: Ladybird Books. ISBN 978-0-241-38656-9.
- ——; —— (15 November 2018). The Wonderful World of Ladybird Books for Grown-Ups. London: Ladybird Books. ISBN 978-0-241-36404-8.
- ——; —— (3 October 2019). A Ladybird book about Donald Trump. Loughborough: Ladybird Books. ISBN 978-0-241-42272-4.

== See also ==
- Bollocks to Alton Towers (ISBN 0-14-102120-9)
- More Bollocks to Alton Towers (ISBN 0-14-102785-1)
