= The Framley Examiner =

English parody newspaper

- Website type: Newspaper parody; Humor website
- Available in: English
- Website: framleyexaminer.com
- Launched: 2001

The Framley Examiner is a parody of a newspaper in a small provincial English town, created as a website and later a book. It is written by Robin Halstead, Jason Hazeley, Alex Morris and Joel Morris.

== History ==
The Framley Examiner originally began as a website, started in 2001. Its success then spawned a book The Framley Examiner (ISBN 0-7181-4579-8) described on the cover as "the book of the website of the newspaper". A second book, Historic Framley (ISBN 0-14-101528-4), was later published, being described as "produced in association with Framley Museum".

Its writers are regular contributors to Viz magazine. The book Bollocks to Alton Towers (ISBN 0-7181-4791-X), published in April 2005, by the same authors, is a non-fiction book unrelated to The Framley Examiner. The website was last updated on 23 July 2013, but more recent posts have been made to social media accounts.

In May 2020, the Framley Examiner website was updated to reveal the launch of a crowd-funding appeal via Unbound with the aim of publishing the now out-of-print Framley Examiner along with additional, previously unpublished material.

The father of Joel and Alex Morris worked as a local journalist in Chelmsford, Essex, but the group have dismissed any connection of Framley to the town, saying that "It wasn't meant to be targeting one particular rag."

== Places ==
=== Framley and district ===
- Framley
- Wripple
- Codge
- Chipney
- Batley
- The Dungeon Housing Estate, which has more single fathers than there are grains of sand in the mighty desert
- Clown
- Glibley
- Durbiton
- Shilillingbury Lillingbury Illingbury On Ingbury
- Thoxtoxeter
- Effing Sodbury
- Ovenly
- Bellaire, home of the Bellaire Hillock.
- Princes Freshborough (these last two are a reference to the TV show The Fresh Prince of Bel-Air)

=== St Eyot's and district ===
- St Eyot's, whose historic castle is thought to be the home of Britain's first batman
- Slovenly
- Urling
- Fracton
- Clinton
- Flapton Nogley
- Stanglebridge
- Yopney St Oh!
- Queff
- Gartside Green

=== Molford and district ===
- Molford
- Molford St Gavin
- Molford St Malcolm
- Molford St Arahim Rhamal
- Robot Oak, a utopian village constructed of artificial materials and populated by robots
- Ghastley St Matthew
- Crème
- Tellephant
- Strawbury Magma
- Diesel Park West

=== Sockford and district ===
- Sockford holds an annual Vulture Jamboree in which visitors are invited to 'Discover how to Milk Vultures' and could meet Lazenby, Framley's biggest Hedgehog (until he died of prickleworm)
- Lessbury Moreborough

=== Whoft and district ===
- Whoft, which frequently suffered deluges of fluff, and was famous for its annual fete (featuring the 'Kitten in a Bottle' competition) until being completely destroyed by property developers due to a planning error.
- Wotten Plodney
- Queues Likely
- Little Godley, controlled by councillor Haris Paris, who mounted a military coup in late 1994 after someone parked a blue P Reg Mondeo in his allocated parking space.
- Chutney
- King's Mustard
- Clifton James
- Steeplecocque

=== Outlying districts ===
- Carnaby Constable
- Cloxted
- Rockney
- Hazeldean Inchmistress
- Billberry Buryborry
- Nyth

== See also ==
- List of satirical news websites
