= Potamo of Alexandria =

Roman-era Greek philosopher

Potamo (or Potamon) of Alexandria (Greek: Ποτάμων ὁ Ἀλεξανδρεύς) was an eclectic philosopher who lived in the Roman era. According to Diogenes Laërtius, Potamo had "not long ago" created an eclectic sect of philosophy, which would mean that he lived sometime around the 2nd century CE. However, the Suda says that Potamo lived in the age of Augustus (late 1st century BC) which, if true, would mean that Laërtius probably copied a statement, without alteration, from an earlier writer.

According to Laërtius he combined doctrines derived from the various philosophy schools (Platonism, Peripateticism, Stoicism, etc.) together with original views of his own. According to the Suda he wrote a commentary on the Republic of Plato. Diogenes Laërtius provides us with some details concerning his philosophical views:

He himself states in his Elements of Philosophy, he takes as criteria of truth (1) that by which the judgement is formed, namely, the ruling principle of the soul; (2) the instrument used, for instance the most accurate perception. His universal principles are matter and the efficient cause, quality, and place; for that out of which and that by which a thing is made, as well as the quality with which and the place in which it is made, are principles. The end to which he refers all actions is life made perfect in all virtue, natural advantages of body and environment being indispensable to its attainment.

There is no reason to associate him with the Potamo mentioned by Porphyry in his Life of Plotinus.

== Bibliography ==
- Myrto Hatzimachali (2011). Potamo of Alexandria and the Emergence of Eclecticism in Late Hellenistic Philosophy. Cambridge: Cambridge University Press.
