= Diane Morgan =

English actress, comedian, writer (born 1975)

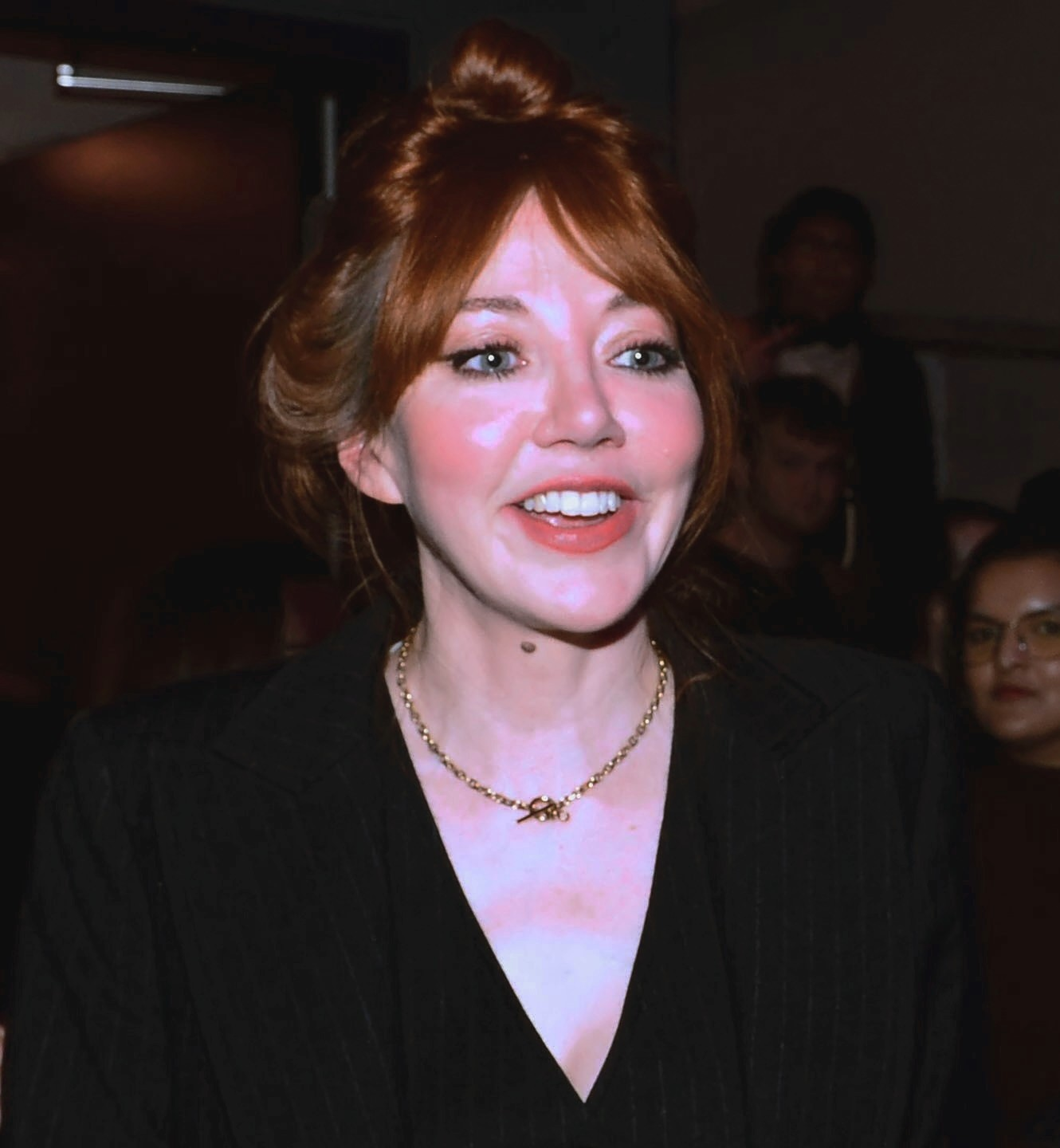
- Morgan in 2024
- Born: 5 October 1975 (age 51); Farnworth, Greater Manchester, England
- Education: East 15 Acting School
- Occupations: Actress; comedian; writer
- Years active: 2002–present
- Partner: Ben Caudell

Diane Morgan (born 5 October 1975) is an English actress, comedian and writer. She played the role of Philomena Cunk in the comedy series Charlie Brooker's Weekly Wipe (2013–2020) and the mockumentary series Cunk on Britain (2018), Cunk on Earth (2022), Cunk on Life (2024), and Cunk on Cinema (2026). The role earned her nominations for two British Academy Television Awards and a Primetime Emmy Award.

Morgan played Liz on the BBC Two sitcom Motherland (2016–2022) and Kath in the Netflix dark comedy series After Life (2019–2022). She wrote and starred in the BBC Two comedy series Mandy (2019–present), for which she received a nomination for the British Academy Television Award for Best Female Comedy Performance. In 2026, she co-wrote and starred in the sitcom Ann Droid.

== Early life ==
Morgan was born in Farnworth, Greater Manchester, on 5 October 1975, to Peter, a physiotherapist, and Eirwen (née Roderick), a stay-at-home mother; they married in 1968. She has one elder brother Stephen born in 1969. She grew up in Farnworth and Kearsley and attended George Tomlinson School in Kearsley. When she was 20, she studied at the East 15 Acting School in Loughton, Essex. She said in an August 2020 interview: "There were a few actors on my father's side of the family: Julie Goodyear, Frank Finlay and Jack Wild. What a dynasty. We're like the Redgraves. Julie's got a touch of the Mandys, actually. Maybe I could cast her as Mandy's mum." Her family has Welsh, English, Scottish and German roots.

== Career ==
She had a small acting role as Dawn in Peter Kay's Phoenix Nights, before taking various other jobs, including as a dental assistant, a telemarketer, a potato peeler at a chip shop, selling Avon, and boxing up worming tablets in a factory. She subsequently made her first attempt at stand-up comedy at age 30. She was placed second in the Hackney Empire New Act of the Year award in 2006, and as runner-up in the 2006 Funny Women Awards.

Morgan and Joe Wilkinson later formed a sketch comedy duo called Two Episodes of Mash. From 2008, they performed at the Edinburgh Festival Fringe for three consecutive years, and in 2010, they appeared on Robert Webb's satirical news show Robert's Web. In 2012, the act completed its second BBC radio series (co-starring David O'Doherty), and appeared in BBC Three's Live at the Electric. In the same year, she appeared in Him & Her, which featured Wilkinson, and in 2013, she played Nicola in the ITV TV series Pat & Cabbage. In 2014, she made an appearance in the Channel 4 TV series Utopia, as Tess.

She appeared on Mock the Week in 2010 and 2011 and appeared on Would I Lie to You? filmed on 13 May 2016 and 19 May 2018. In 2015 she appeared in two episodes of Drunk History. She was a guest on Have I Got News for You in April 2015 and April 2016, and hosted the show in May 2023. In August 2025, Morgan was announced as a contestant on the second series of LOL: Last One Laughing UK.

=== Philomena Cunk ===
Morgan is known for her deadpan portrayal of Philomena Cunk (/ˌfɪləˈmiːnə ˈkʌŋk/), an earnest but stupid interviewer and commentator on history, culture and current affairs. The character first appeared on Charlie Brooker's Weekly Wipe (2013–2015), including as the presenter of a regular segment titled "Moments of Wonder". According to Charlie Brooker, Cunk was originally conceived as a middle-class lifestyle blogger, partly in response to criticism of the portrayal of working-class accents in his comedy. Morgan asked to audition for the role in her own Bolton accent, believing it would be funnier. Brooker praised her deadpan interpretation, which became central to the character.

Cunk has since appeared in other mockumentary contexts. In May 2016, she presented BBC Two's Cunk on Shakespeare. In December 2016, she presented BBC Two's Cunk on Christmas. In April 2018, the five-part historical mockumentary Cunk on Britain began broadcasting on BBC Two. The series gained viral traction for her deadpan interactions with academics, notably a widely circulated clip where she confused King Arthur's legendary castle Camelot with the phrase "came a lot".

In December 2019, Morgan appeared as Cunk for short episodes of Cunk and Other Humans, once again on BBC Two. She returned in a one-off episode of Charlie Brooker's Weekly Wipe titled "Antiviral Wipe", about the COVID-19 pandemic, in May 2020. Another series, Cunk on Earth, premiered in September 2022 on BBC Two. For her performance in the latter, Morgan was nominated for the British Academy Television Award for Best Female Comedy Performance. In 2024, the book The World According To Cunk released in October 2024, which includes illustrations drawn by Morgan. Morgan appeared as Cunk in the one-off extended special Cunk on Life, which was broadcast in December 2024 on BBC Two. The special earned Morgan a Primetime Emmy Award nomination for Outstanding Writing for a Variety Special. In 2026, a new three-part series entitled Cunk on Cinema was commissioned for the BBC and Netflix.

=== Other roles ===
Morgan played David Brent's public relations expert in the film David Brent: Life on the Road (2016). She played Sharon in the film Me Before You, starring Emilia Clarke and Sam Claflin. She has appeared in several short films, including The Boot Sale, which was shortlisted in the Virgin Media Shorts film competition 2010. In 2016, Morgan played Mandy in Sky One's comedy Rovers, appearing in all six episodes of the first series airing from 24 May to 28 June. She appeared in the pilot for the BBC Two comedy We the Jury as Olivia. She also plays receptionist Talia in Sky's comedy drama Mount Pleasant and Liz in the BBC Two sitcom Motherland.

Morgan plays Kath in the Netflix black-comedy series After Life, written by Ricky Gervais. She starred in the Gold sitcom The Cockfields, again alongside Wilkinson, and in comedy-drama Frayed in 2019. In 2019, she wrote, directed, and starred in the BBC Two comedy short Mandy, described as "a comedy by Diane Morgan about Mandy, a woman who really, really wants a sofa, and will stop at absolutely nothing to get it". Carol Decker appeared as herself in the short. The character returned in August 2020 for the full series Mandy, with Shaun Ryder, Maxine Peake, and Natalie Cassidy in guest roles. A Christmas special, We Wish You a Mandy Christmas, loosely based on A Christmas Carol, was broadcast in December 2021.

Also in 2020, Morgan played Gemma Nerrick in the British mockumentary Death to 2020, created by Charlie Brooker and Annabel Jones. She reprised the role in Death to 2021. She voiced the character 105E in the 2021 animated Cartoon Network series Elliott from Earth. In April 2022, Morgan starred as Donna in "Merrily, Merrily", the first episode of the seventh series of Inside No. 9. In December 2022, Morgan reprised her role as Liz on Motherland for the Christmas special.

In 2024, Morgan starred in the music video for Paul Heaton's "Fish 'N' Chip Supper". In December 2024, Morgan starred in the Aardman Animations production Wallace & Gromit: Vengeance Most Fowl as local news reporter Onya Doorstep. In 2026, Morgan co-wrote and starred in Ann Droid, which follows Sue, a widow whose husband died 18 months previously. Morgan plays Sue's new "pre-loved" android assistant Linda, a vintage AnnDroid Z58/100 Basic Eldercare Robot paid for by her son, Michael, who is moving out of the house to try to fix his marriage.

== Personal life ==
Interviewed by Stuart Jeffries for The Guardian in May 2016, Morgan said: "I've always wanted to make people laugh. It's been my only ambition, ever since my dad introduced me to the genius of the great comedians: Tony Hancock, Woody Allen, people like that. While other kids were into New Kids on the Block, I was into Harold Lloyd and Stan Laurel. I'm still like that. I don't have any hobbies."

In 2017, Morgan was living in the Bloomsbury district of London with her boyfriend Ben Caudell, a BBC comedy producer.

In July 2023, Morgan was awarded an honorary doctorate by the University of Bolton for her contribution to television and comedy.

She is vegan and an animal rights activist. A rescue dog adopted by Morgan in July 2019, credited as Robert "Bovril" Morgan, appeared in a Mandy Christmas special in 2021. In 2025 she became the patron of the charity Moggies Cat Rescue in Aberdare, South Wales.

Morgan traced her family history in a 2025 episode of the BBC genealogy series Who Do You Think You Are?, in which she discovered that she has Scottish, Welsh and German ancestry.

== Filmography ==
=== Film ===
Year	Title	Role	Notes	Ref.
2003	La jalousie	Sally	Short film	
2009	Mr. Right	Blue Team Woman		
2010	The Boot Sale	Diane	Short film	
2012	Get Lucky	Betting Shop Keeper	Short film	
2012	Complaints		Video short	
2013	Cheese by Mouth	Val	Short film	
2013	Alan Partridge: Alpha Papa	Girl in crowd		
2014	Paradise Males	Pam	Short film	
2014	What's Wrong?	Woman	Short film	
2015	Baguettes	Woman on bench	Short film	
2016	Me Before You	Sharon		
2016	David Brent: Life on the Road	Briony Jones		
2017	Funny Cow	Margaret		
2018	Thawed	Diane	Short film; also writer	
2020	Death to 2020	Gemma Nerrick		
2021	Death to 2021	Gemma Nerrick		
2024	Wallace & Gromit: Vengeance Most Fowl	Onya Doorstep	Voice role	
2026	Rogue Trooper	Colonel Logan		
2027	Not Alone †	Welly	Voice role	

=== Television ===
Year	Title	Role	Notes	Ref.
2002	Phoenix Nights	Dawn	Episode: "Stars in their Eyes"; uncredited	
2010	Robert's Web	Herself	4 episodes, fictionalized, as part of Two Episodes of Mash	
2010–2011	Mock The Week	Herself	2 episodes	
2011–2012	Mount Pleasant	Talia	12 episodes	
2012	The Royal Bodyguard	Sharon	Episode: "Bullets over Broad Street"	
2012	Games On	Elaine Price	Episode: "XXXL"	
2012	The Work Experience	Susan Butler	6 episodes	
2012	Him & Her	Gina	3 episodes	
2012–2014	Live at the Electric	Herself	24 episodes, fictionalized, as part of Two Episodes of Mash	
2013	Pat & Cabbage	Nicola	6 episodes	
2013	Freshers	Narrator		
2013–2020	Charlie Brooker's Weekly Wipe	Philomena Cunk	18 episodes, 6 specials	
2014	Utopia	Tess	2 episodes	
2014	The Mimic	Psychoanalyst	Series 2: Episode 3	
2014	Roisin Conaty: Onwards and Onwards	Book Group Organiser	Episode 3: "Promises"	
2015	Uncle	Suzan	Series 2: Episode 5	
2015	So Awkward	Mrs Lazarus	Series 1: Episode 9	
2015	Three Kinds of Stupid	Mittens		
2016	Cunk on Shakespeare	Philomena Cunk		
2016	Rovers	Mandy Trevor	6 episodes	
2016	We the Jury	Olivia	Pilot episode	
2016	Damned	Phoebe Ravenscroft	Series 1: Episode 4	
2016	Cunk on Christmas	Philomena Cunk		
2016–2022	Motherland	Liz	20 episodes	
2018	Cunk on Britain	Philomena Cunk	5 episodes	
2018	Chris P. Duck	Tracey	6 episodes	
2018–2019	The Archiveologists		Voice only; 6 episodes; also writer	
2019	The Cockfields	Donna	3 episodes	
2019	Cunk & Other Humans on 2019	Philomena Cunk	6 five minute episodes	
2019–2021	Frayed	Fiona	12 episodes	
2019–2022	After Life	Kath	18 episodes	
2019–present	Mandy	Mandy Carter	26 episodes; also creator, writer, director and executive producer	
2021	Elliott from Earth	105E	Voice only; 2 episodes	
2021	Intelligence	Charlotte	3 episodes	
2022	Inside No. 9	Donna	Series 7: Episode 1	
2022	The Sandman	Gryphon	Voice only; Episode: "Dream of a Thousand Cats"	
2022	Cunk on Earth	Philomena Cunk	5 episodes	
2022	Our Boarding School	Narrator		
2024	The Completely Made-Up Adventures of Dick Turpin	Maureen	Episode 4: "Curse of the Reddlehag"	
2024	The Underdog: Josh Must Win	Narrator		
2024	Cunk on Life	Philomena Cunk	Also additional writer; One-off extended special	
2025	Who Do You Think You Are?	Herself	Series 22: Episode 8	
2025	The Power of Parker	Mic	3 Episodes	
2025	Kiff	Secretary Mom	Voice role, Season 2 Episode 22: "PS You're Fired"	
2025	Phineas and Ferb	Chowdina	Voice role, Season 5 Episode 33: "Bread Bowl Hot Tub"	
2026	LOL: Last One Laughing UK	Herself	Contestant; Series 2	
2026	Ann Droid	Linda	Co-writer & executive producer	
2026	Alley Cats	Olive	Voice role	
2026	The Golden Cobra	Paisley Brook	Voice role	
2026	VisionQuest	Tactical A.I. / Handler	Main Role	
2026	Cunk on Cinema	Philomena Cunk	Main Role; 3 episodes (UK) / 6 episodes (global); also executive producer and writer	

== Awards and nominations ==
Year	Award	Category	Nominee(s)	Result	Ref
2006	Hackney Empire New Act of the Year Award		Herself	Runner-up	
2006	Funny Women Award		Herself	Runner-up	
2017	British Academy Television Awards	Best Female Comedy Performance	Cunk on Shakespeare	Nominated	
2023	British Academy Television Awards	Best Female Comedy Performance	Cunk on Earth	Nominated	
2025	Primetime Emmy Awards	Outstanding Writing for a Variety Special	Cunk on Life	Nominated	
2026	British Academy Television Awards	Best Female Comedy Performance	Mandy	Nominated	
