= Daniel Kaluuya on screen and stage =

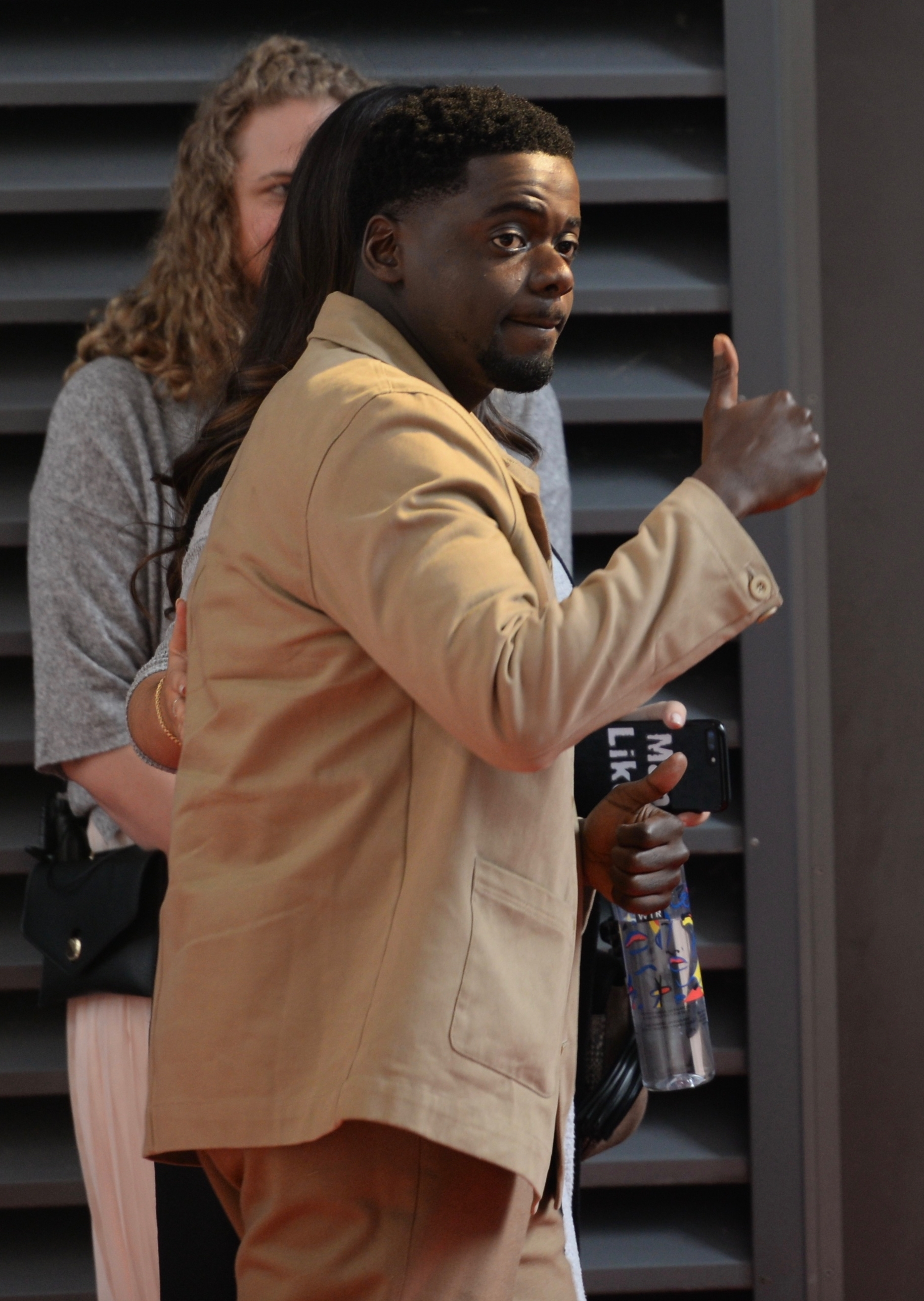
Kaluuya at the 2018 TIFF

Daniel Kaluuya is an English actor known for his performances on stage and screen as well as for his work as director, writer, and producer on the latter. Kaluuya began his career as a teenager in improvisational theatre, playing Posh Kenneth in the first two seasons of the television series Skins (2007–2009), in which he also co-wrote some episodes. He went on to gain attention for his television roles in Psychoville (2009–2011), The Fades (2011), and the Black Mirror episode "Fifteen Million Merits" (2011).

In 2017, Kaluuya had his breakthrough starring in Jordan Peele's horror film Get Out, which garnered him a nomination for the Academy Award for Best Actor. This was followed by roles in Ryan Coogler's superhero film Black Panther (2018), Steve McQueen's crime drama Widows (2018), Peele's horror film Nope (2022), and Sony Pictures Animation's animated superhero film Spider-Man: Across the Spider-Verse (2023). For his portrayal of Black Panther Party leader Fred Hampton in the biopic Judas and the Black Messiah (2021), he won the BAFTA and Academy Award for Best Supporting Actor. He has since co-directed the drama The Kitchen (2023).

== Film ==
Key
†	Denotes productions that have not yet been released

Year	Title	Role	Notes
2006	Shoot the Messenger	Reece	First credit
2008	Cass	Young Cass Pennant	
2010	Baby	Damon	Short film
2010	Chatroom	Mo	
2011	Johnny English Reborn	Agent Colin Tucker	
2013	Jonah	Mbwana	Short film
2013	Welcome to the Punch	Juka Ogadowa	
2013	Kick-Ass 2	Black Death	
2015	Sicario	Reggie Wayne	
2017	Get Out	Chris Washington	
2018	Black Panther	W'Kabi	
2018	Widows	Jatemme Manning	
2019	Queen & Slim	Ernest "Slim" Hines	Also executive producer
2020	A Christmas Carol	Ghost of Christmas Present (voice)	
2020	Two Single Beds	Jay	Short film
2021	Judas and the Black Messiah	Fred Hampton	Academy Award for Best Supporting Actor
2022	Honk for Jesus. Save Your Soul.	—N/a	Producer
2022	Nope	Otis "OJ" Haywood Jr.	
2023	Spider-Man: Across the Spider-Verse	Hobart "Hobie" Brown / Spider-Punk (voice)	
2023	The Kitchen	—N/a	Co-director, co-writer, and producer
2026	Misty Green	Jay Green	
2027	Spider-Man: Beyond the Spider-Verse †	Hobart "Hobie" Brown / Spider-Punk (voice)	In production

== Television ==
Year	Title	Role	Notes
2007	The Whistleblowers	School Bully	Episode: "No Child Left Behind"
2007	Comedy: Shuffle	Dean	Episode: "Brendon Burns"
2007–2009	Skins	Posh Kenneth	11 episodes; Also contributing writer and head writer for 2 episodes
2008	Delta Forever	Roger	Episode: "Pilot"
2008	Silent Witness	Errol Harris	2 episodes
2008–2009	That Mitchell and Webb Look	Various	2 episodes
2009	Doctor Who	Barclay	Episode: "Planet of the Dead"
2009	Lewis	Declan	Episode: "Counter Culture Blues"
2009	FM	Ades	4 episodes
2009	The Philanthropist		Episode: "Nigeria Part II"
2009	10 Minute Tales	Soldier #2	Episode: "The Three Kings"
2009–2011	Psychoville	Michael "Tealeaf" Fry	12 episodes
2010	Comedy Lab	Various	Episode: "Happy Finish"
2010–2012	Harry & Paul	Parking Pataweyo	5 episodes
2011	Coming Up	Micah	Episode: "Micah"
2011	The Fades	Michael "Mac" Armstrong	6 episodes
2011	Black Mirror	Bingham "Bing" Madsen	Episode: "Fifteen Million Merits"
2011	Random	Brother	Television film
2014	Babylon	Matt Coward	7 episodes
2018	Watership Down	Bluebell (voice)	Miniseries
2021	Saturday Night Live	Himself (host)	Episode: "Daniel Kaluuya/St. Vincent"
2022	All or Nothing: Arsenal	Narrator	Docuseries

== Theatre ==
Year	Title	Role	Playwright	Venue	Ref.
2008–2009	Oxford Street	Performer	Levi David Addai	Royal Court Theatre, London	
2010	Sucker Punch	Leon	Roy Williams	Royal Court Theatre, London	
2013	Trelawny of the "Wells"	Tom Wrench	Arthur Wing Pinero	Donmar Warehouse, London	
2013	A Season in the Congo	Joseph Mobutu	Aimé Césaire	Young Vic, London	
2016	Blue/Orange	Christopher	Joe Penhall	Young Vic, London	
2027	Grass	Son	Branden Jacobs-Jenkins	Park Avenue Armory, Off-Broadway	

== See also ==
- List of British actors
- List of Academy Award winners and nominees from Great Britain
- List of youngest Academy Award winners for Best Supporting Actor
- List of actors with Academy Award nominations
- List of actors with more than one Academy Award nomination in the acting categories
- List of Black Golden Globe winners and nominees
- List of Golden Globe winners
