= List of awards and nominations received by Daniel Kaluuya =

Daniel Kaluuya awards and nominations
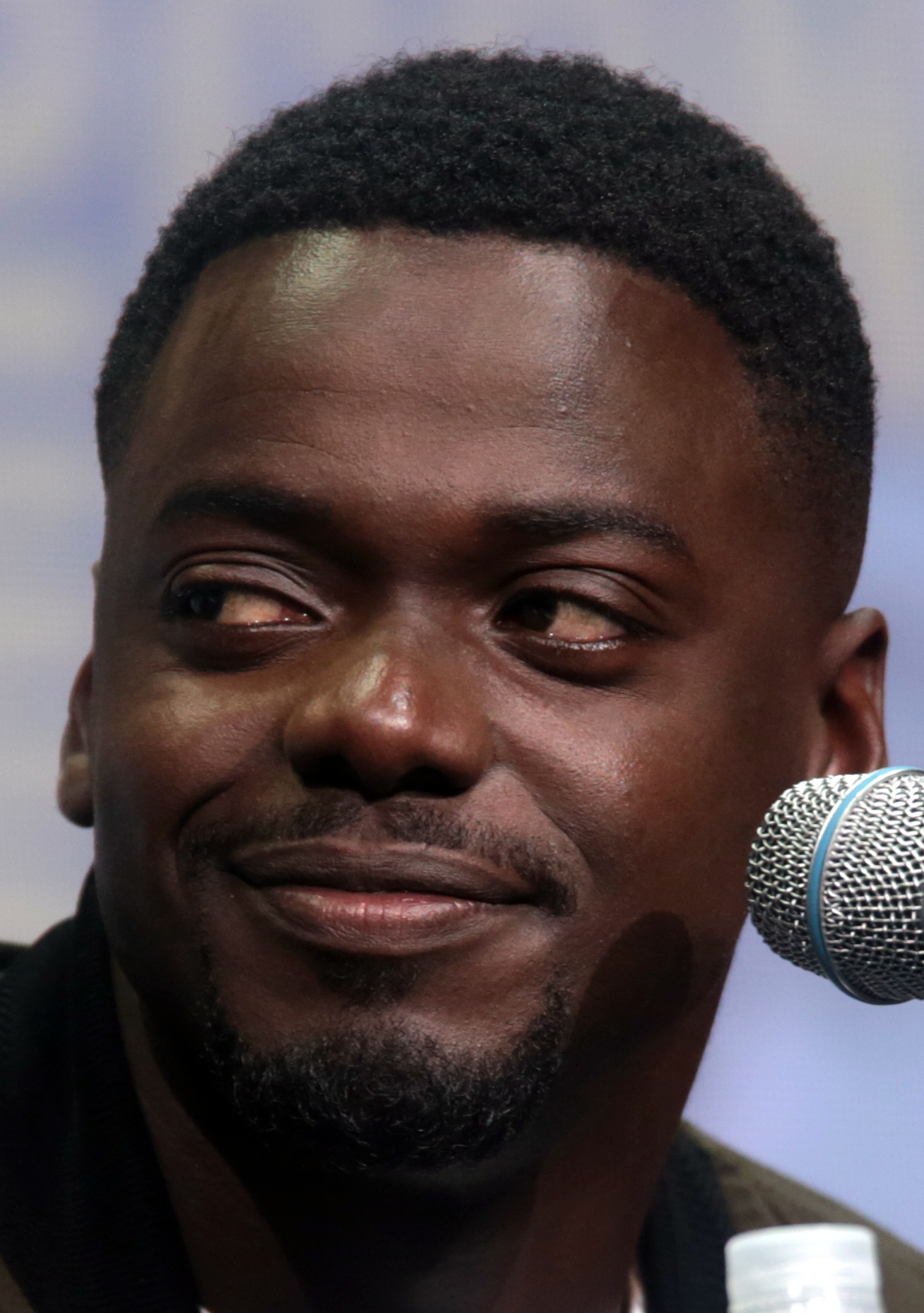
- Kaluuya at the 2017 San Diego Comic-Con
Awards and nominations
Award	Wins	Nominations
Academy Awards	1	2
BAFTA	2	3
Emmys	0	1
Golden Globe Awards	1	2
Screen Actors Guild Awards	2	4

Totals (Note: Certain award groups do not simply award one winner. They acknowledge several different recipients, have runners-up, and have third place. Since this is a specific recognition and is different from losing an award, runner-up mentions are considered wins in this award tally. For simplification and to avoid errors, each award in this list has been presumed to have had a prior nomination.)
- Wins: 18
- Nominations: 27

Daniel Kaluuya is a British actor who has received various accolades throughout his career including one Academy Award, two British Academy Film Awards, two Screen Actors Guild Awards, and one Golden Globe Award.

He played Michael "Tealeaf" Fry in the BBC dark comedy series Psychoville and Michael "Mac" Armstrong in the BBC Three horror drama series The Fades. He gained further acclaim for his performance as Bingham "Bing" Madsen in the Black Mirror episode "Fifteen Million Merits". Kaluuya appeared as Agent Colin Tucker in the 2011 film Johnny English Reborn and portrayed Black Death in the 2013 film Kick-Ass 2. In 2015, he had a supporting role in Denis Villeneuve's film Sicario. His breakthrough came for the critically acclaimed horror film Get Out (2017), for which he earned numerous accolades, including nominations for the Academy Award, BAFTA Award, SAG Award, and Golden Globe Award for Best Actor. That same year, he also received the BAFTA Rising Star Award.

In 2018, he starred in the Marvel Cinematic Universe film, Black Panther for which he, along with the rest of the cast, received a Screen Actors Guild Award for Outstanding Performance by a Cast in a Motion Picture. In 2018 he also starred in the crime thriller film Widows. In 2019, he starred in the romantic crime film, Queen & Slim for which he received a nomination for an NAACP Image Awards. In 2020, he starred as revolutionary socialist Fred Hampton in the biographical drama, Judas and the Black Messiah. His performance in the film was lauded by critics, and he received an Academy Award, a BAFTA Award, a Golden Globe Award and a Screen Actors Guild Award, all for Best Actor in a Supporting Role. At 32, he is the seventh-youngest Best Supporting Actor winner of the former.

== Major associations ==
=== Academy Awards ===
Year	Category	Nominated work	Result	Ref.
2018	Best Actor	Get Out	Nominated	
2021	Best Supporting Actor	Judas and the Black Messiah	Won	

=== BAFTA Awards ===
Year	Category	Nominated work	Result	Ref.
British Academy Film Awards
2018	Rising Star Award		Won	
2018	Best Actor in a Leading Role	Get Out	Nominated	
2021	Best Actor in a Supporting Role	Judas and the Black Messiah	Won	

=== Emmy Awards ===
Year	Category	Nominated work	Result	Ref.
Primetime Emmy Awards
2021	Outstanding Guest Actor in a Comedy Series	Saturday Night Live	Nominated	

=== Golden Globe Awards ===
Year	Category	Nominated work	Result	Ref.
2018	Best Actor – Motion Picture Musical or Comedy	Get Out	Nominated	
2021	Best Supporting Actor – Motion Picture	Judas and the Black Messiah	Won	

=== Laurence Olivier Award ===
Year	Category	Nominated work	Result	Ref.
2009	Outstanding Achievement in an Affiliate Theatre	Oxford Street	Nominated	

=== Screen Actors Guild Awards ===
Year	Category	Nominated work	Result	Ref.
2018	Outstanding Actor in a Leading Role	Get Out	Nominated	
2018	Outstanding Cast in a Motion Picture	Get Out	Nominated	
2019	Outstanding Cast in a Motion Picture	Black Panther	Won	
2021	Outstanding Actor in a Supporting Role	Judas and the Black Messiah	Won	

== Industry awards ==
=== Evening Standard Theatre Awards ===
Year	Category	Nominated work	Result	Ref.
2010	Evening Stand Award for Outstanding Newcomer	Sucker Punch	Won	

=== Gotham Awards ===
Year	Category	Nominated work	Result	Ref.
2017	Best Actor	Get Out	Nominated	

=== Independent Spirit Awards ===
Year	Category	Nominated work	Result	Ref.
2018	Best Male Lead	Get Out	Nominated	

=== National Board of Review ===
Year	Category	Nominated work	Result	Ref.
2017	Best Cast	Get Out	Won	

== Critics awards ==
=== African American Film Critics Association ===
Year	Category	Nominated work	Result	Ref.
2017	Best Actor	Get Out	Won	

=== Austin Film Critics Association ===
Year	Category	Nominated work	Result	Ref.
2021	Best Supporting Actor	Judas and the Black Messiah	Won	

=== Boston Society of Film Critics ===
Year	Category	Nominated work	Result	Ref.
2017	Best Actor	Get Out	Won	

=== Critics' Choice Movie Awards ===
Year	Category	Nominated work	Result	Ref.
2018	Best Actor	Get Out	Nominated	
2019	Best Acting Ensemble	Black Panther	Nominated	
2019	Best Acting Ensemble	Widows	Nominated	
2021	Best Acting Ensemble	Judas and the Black Messiah	Nominated	
2021	Best Supporting Actor	Judas and the Black Messiah	Won	

=== Houston Film Critics Society ===
Year	Category	Nominated work	Result	Ref.
2018	Best Actor	Get Out	Nominated	

=== San Diego Film Critics Society ===
Year	Category	Nominated work	Result	Ref.
2017	Best Performance by an Ensemble	Get Out	Nominated	

=== San Francisco Film Critics Circle ===
Year	Category	Nominated work	Result	Ref.
2017	Best Actor	Get Out	Nominated	

=== Seattle Film Critics Society ===
Year	Category	Nominated work	Result	Ref.
2017	Best Actor	Get Out	Nominated	
2017	Best Ensemble	Get Out	Won	

=== Washington D.C. Area Film Critics Association ===
Year	Category	Nominated work	Result	Ref.
2017	Best Actor	Get Out	Nominated	
2020	Best Supporting Actor	Judas and the Black Messiah	Nominated	

=== Women Film Critics Circle ===
Year	Category	Nominated work	Result	Ref.
2017	Best Actor	Get Out	Nominated	

== Miscellaneous awards ==
=== Black Reel Awards ===
Year	Category	Nominated work	Result	Ref.
2018	Outstanding Actor	Get Out	Won	
2018	Outstanding Breakthrough Performance, Male	Get Out	Won	
2021	Outstanding Supporting Actor	Judas and the Black Messiah	Won	

=== IGN Awards ===
Year	Category	Nominated work	Result	Ref.
2017	Best Lead Performer in a Movie	Get Out	Nominated	

=== MTV Movie & TV Awards ===
Year	Category	Nominated work	Result	Ref.
2017	Next Generation	Get Out	Won	
2017	Best Actor in a Movie	Get Out	Nominated	
2017	Best On-Screen Duo (with Lil Rel Howery)	Get Out	Nominated	
2021	Best Performance in a Movie	Judas and the Black Messiah	Nominated	

=== NAACP Image Awards ===
Year	Category	Nominated work	Result	Ref.
2018	Outstanding Actor in a Motion Picture	Get Out	Won	
2020	Outstanding Actor in a Motion Picture	Queen & Slim	Nominated	

=== Saturn Awards ===
Year	Category	Nominated work	Result	Ref.
2018	Best Actor	Get Out	Nominated	
2022	Best Actor	Nope	Nominated	

== See also ==
- List of British actors
- List of Academy Award winners and nominees from Great Britain
- List of youngest Academy Award winners for Best Supporting Actor
- List of actors with Academy Award nominations
- List of actors with more than one Academy Award nomination in the acting categories
- List of Black Golden Globe winners and nominees
- List of Golden Globe winners
