= Hope Ikpoku Jnr =

British actor and rapper

- Born: 30 September 2001 (age 24); Hackney, London
- Occupation: Actor
- Years active: 2011-Present

Hope Ikpoku Jnr (born 30 September 2001) is a British actor and musician. He first gained recognition in the Netflix series Top Boy (2019-2022). He has also starred in Daniel Kaluuya’s The Kitchen (2023) and The Day of the Jackal (2024). He began his career in music with the release of his debut EP Stop the Rain and subsequent singles.

== Early life and education ==
Ikpoku Jnr was born and grew up in the London borough of Hackney. As a child, he did performing arts classes and had a role as a child villager in the Millfields Arts Theatre’s Beauty and the Beast play (2011). He attended Mossbourne Community Academy from 2013 to 2020 and attended a six week summer course funded by the school at the Sylvia Young Theatre School. He joined the agency and returned to acting where he went on to audition for his first onscreen role in Top Boy at age 16.

== Career ==
In Netflix's revival of Top Boy, created by Ronan Bennett, Ikpoku portrayed Aaron Tovell, the younger brother of London Fields leader Jamie Tovell in series 3 and 4. He also starred in Noel Clarke and Ashley Walters's British police procedural, Bulletproof as Eugene. In 2022, he portrayed Ash in Ashley Chin's biographical film, Faith. His next role in film was Daniel Kaluuya's The Kitchen as Staples. In 2024, he portrayed Adam in The Day of the Jackal.

== Filmography ==
=== Television ===
Year	Title	Role	Other Notes
2019-2022	Top Boy	Aaron Tovell	Series 3-4 and mentioned in Series 5
2020	Bulletproof	Eugene	Series 2 Episode 2.7
2024	The Day of the Jackal	Adam	2 episodes

=== Film ===
Year	Title	Role	Other Notes
2022	Faith	Ash	
2023	The Kitchen	Staples	
