= Jodie Turner =

Jodie Turner may refer to:

- Jodie Turner, minor character in Australian television drama series Big Sky played by Sharyn Hodgson

== See also ==
- Jodie Turner-Smith (born 1986), British model and actress
