= The Neon Demon =

2016 film directed by Nicolas Winding Refn

- Theatrical release poster
- Directed by: Nicolas Winding Refn
- Screenplay by: Mary Laws; Nicolas Winding Refn; Polly Stenham
- Story by: Nicolas Winding Refn
- Produced by: Lene Børglum; Sidonie Dumas; Vincent Maraval
- Starring: Elle Fanning; Karl Glusman; Jena Malone; Bella Heathcote; Abbey Lee; Desmond Harrington; Christina Hendricks; Keanu Reeves
- Cinematography: Natasha Braier
- Edited by: Matthew Newman
- Music by: Cliff Martinez
- Production companies: Space Rocket Nation; Gaumont; Vendian Entertainment; Bold Films
- Distributed by: Amazon Studios; Broad Green Pictures (United States); Scanbox Entertainment (Denmark); The Jokers; Le Pacte (France)
- Release dates: May 20, 2016 (Cannes); June 8, 2016 (France); June 9, 2016 (Denmark); June 24, 2016 (United States)
- Running time: 117 minutes
- Countries: France; Denmark; United States
- Language: English
- Budget: $7.5 million
- Box office: $3.6 million

The Neon Demon is a 2016 arthouse horror film directed by Nicolas Winding Refn, co-written by Mary Laws, Polly Stenham, and Refn, and starring Elle Fanning. The plot follows an aspiring model in Los Angeles whose beauty generates intense fascination and envy within the fashion industry. Supporting roles are played by Karl Glusman, Jena Malone, Bella Heathcote, Abbey Lee, Desmond Harrington, Christina Hendricks, and Keanu Reeves.

An international co-production between France, Denmark, and the United States, the film competed for the Palme d'Or at the 2016 Cannes Film Festival, the third consecutive film directed by Refn to do so, following Drive (2011) and Only God Forgives (2013). In the United States, the film was released theatrically on June 24, 2016 by Amazon Studios and Broad Green Pictures. It opened to polarized reviews with praise for Refn's direction, Malone and Fanning's performances, Martinez's score and particular praise for Braier's cinematography, with the screenplay and graphic content receiving criticism. It ultimately grossed $3.6 million against a production budget of $7.5 million.

== Plot ==
Following the unexplained deaths of her parents, 16-year-old aspiring model Jesse has just moved from a small unnamed town in Georgia to Los Angeles. She meets photographer Dean, who does her first shoot, and makeup artist Ruby, who introduces fellow older models Gigi and Sarah. Gigi and Sarah inquire about Jesse's sexual experiences, which Jesse pretends to have had.

Jesse is signed by Roberta Hoffman, the owner of a modeling agency, who tells her to pretend that she is nineteen and refers her to a test shoot with notable photographer Jack McCarther. That same evening, Jesse goes out with Dean, who shows genuine interest in her as a person beyond her physical appearance. She returns to her motel room to find it has been ravaged by a cougar, who entered through the open balcony door. Hank, the lecherous motel owner, has her pay for the damage, though Dean covers it for her.

For the shoot the next day, McCarther has Jesse strip naked and rubs gold paint onto her body. The shoot is successful, and Gigi and Sarah envy Jesse's youth. Jesse goes to a casting call for fashion designer Robert Sarno where Sarah is also present. Sarno pays no attention to Sarah but is entranced by Jesse's beauty. Distraught, Sarah asks her how it feels to be the one everyone admires. When Jesse admits "it's everything," Sarah jealously lunges toward her. When pulling away, Jesse cuts her hand on a shard of glass. Sarah sucks the blood from Jesse's hand. Jesse rushes back to her motel and faints, hallucinating abstract imagery.

At Sarno's fashion show, Gigi talks to Jesse about cosmetic surgery. As Jesse is closing the show, she has hallucinations of abstract triangular shapes and reflections of herself. After the show, Jesse accompanies Dean to a bar. Sarno engages Dean in a conversation where he negatively contrasts Gigi's surgically-enhanced looks to Jesse's natural beauty and shares his belief that true physical beauty is the most valuable thing there is, outweighing whatever that person may have on the inside. Dean finds the conversation unpleasant and attempts to leave with Jesse, who refuses, having assumed a narcissistic persona.

Jesse has a nightmare of being forced by Hank to sexually swallow a knife. She wakes up to hear someone fidgeting with her door lock. She engages the deadbolt and hears the intruder break into the next room, assaulting the thirteen-year-old female occupant inside (Hank had made implications towards the girl in a previous scene). Terrified, Jesse calls Ruby, who invites Jesse to her home. Ruby makes sexual advances toward Jesse, who immediately rejects them and reveals that she is a virgin. Ruby attempts to sexually assault Jesse, but is repelled by the latter. Rejected, Ruby goes to her second job as a cosmetologist at a morgue and pleasures herself with a female corpse.

Ruby returns home, where Jesse encounters Gigi and Sarah, who, along with Ruby, attack and chase Jesse until Ruby pushes her into the deep end of the empty pool. The women butcher Jesse with knives and consume parts of her body before bathing in her blood. Ruby haphazardly washes the empty pool, lies in Jesse's unmarked grave, and at night, nude, inside her house, a torrent of blood gushes from her genitals as she lies bathed in moonlight.

The next day, Gigi and Sarah attend one of Jack's shoots with another model named Annie. Jack is suddenly enthralled by Sarah and fires Annie. In the midst of the shoot, Gigi runs off set, suddenly ill. Sarah watches Gigi vomit up one of Jesse's eyeballs. She screams with regret, "I need to get her out of me," and stabs herself with a pair of scissors, opening her abdomen vertically. Sarah watches Gigi die and eats the regurgitated eyeball before returning to the shoot.

In the end credits' scene, a woman whose face is not shown (but who is wearing Sarah's jacket) walks alone in the Mojave Desert.

== Cast ==
- Elle Fanning as Jesse
- Karl Glusman as Dean
- Jena Malone as Ruby
- Bella Heathcote as Gigi
- Abbey Lee as Sarah
- Desmond Harrington as Jack McCarther
- Christina Hendricks as Roberta Hoffman
- Keanu Reeves as Hank
- Alessandro Nivola as Robert Sarno
- Charles Baker as Mikey
- Jamie Clayton as Casting Director
- Jodie Turner-Smith as Roberta Hoffman's Assistant
- Houda Shretah as Sarno's assistant

== Production ==
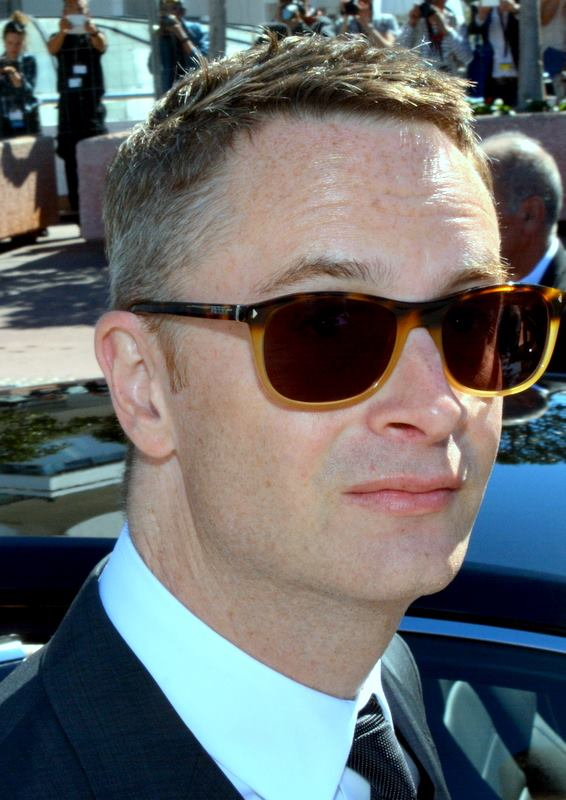
Director Nicolas Winding Refn promoting the film at the 2016 Cannes Film Festival.

On October 22, 2013, it was announced that Refn's new film after Only God Forgives would be a Miami- or Tokyo-set "all-female horror" with "lots of sex" called I Walk with the Dead, with Carey Mulligan attached to star and Polly Stenham writing the script. On November 3, 2014, Refn's production company Space Rocket Nation alongside its co-financiers Gaumont and Wild Bunch announced that Refn's next film would be titled The Neon Demon, to be filmed in Los Angeles in early 2015. Refn commented on the conception of the project: "I woke up one morning a couple of years ago and was like, 'Well, I was never born beautiful, but my wife is,' and I wondered what it had been like going through life with that reality," he says. "I came up with the idea to do a horror film about beauty, not to criticize it or to attack it, but because beauty is a very complex subject. Everyone has an opinion about it."

In January 2015, Dazed reported that the script for the film was inspired by Elizabeth Báthory. In discussing the script, which Refn co-wrote with Mary Laws, he stated: "I decided that I'd made enough films about violent men, and I wanted to do a film with only women in the film, and so I did this story because my wife would only go to L.A. if we had to travel out of Copenhagen. She's like, 'I'm done with Asia. I will only do Los Angeles.' And so I came up with an idea and went to L.A., and I cast this woman called Elle Fanning who is absolutely fantastic, and she played the lead." In subsequent interviews, Refn stated that he visualized the film as an "adult fairy tale."

=== Casting ===
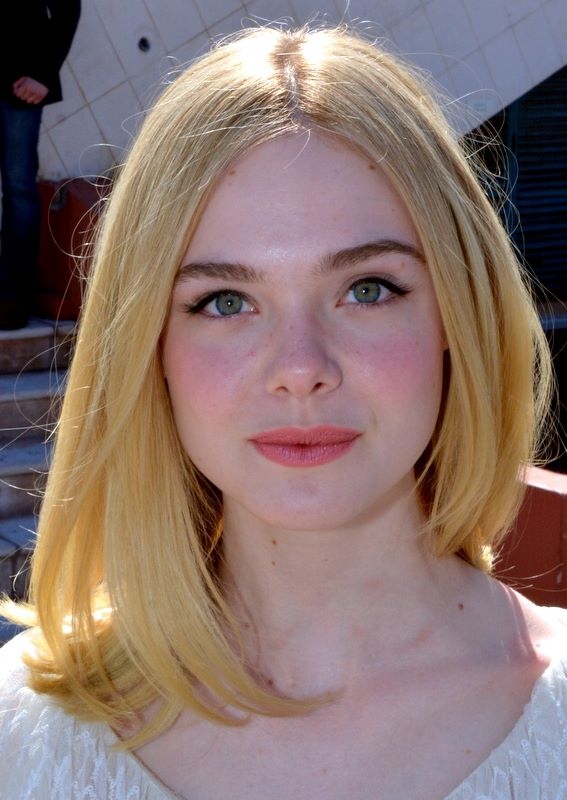
Star Elle Fanning at the Cannes Film Festival.

On January 6, 2015, Elle Fanning joined the film to play an aspiring model, caught in a world of beauty and demise. Fanning came to Refn's attention because of his wife, who had been impressed by her performance in an earlier film. On January 29, Abbey Lee was added to the cast to play the role of Sarah. On February 5, more cast was added to the film, including Keanu Reeves, Christina Hendricks, Jena Malone and Bella Heathcote. On March 17, 2015, Karl Glusman was set to star in the film. Desmond Harrington was added to the cast on March 30, 2015.

=== Filming ===
Principal photography on the film began in Los Angeles on March 30, 2015. Locations included downtown Los Angeles, while the motel sequences were shot on location at a real motel in Pasadena. Natasha Braier was hired as the film's cinematographer.

=== Soundtrack ===
Composer Cliff Martinez, who collaborated with director Refn on Drive, stated the films have similar styles, musically speaking, noting that for The Neon Demon he sought a "sparse electronic score." He stated in an interview that the first half of the film resembles "a melodrama like Valley of the Dolls, and the second half is like The Texas Chain Saw Massacre." According to Refn and Martinez the soundtrack was influenced by Giorgio Moroder, Goblin, Kraftwerk, Vangelis and Tangerine Dream.

The soundtrack for the film was released on June 24, 2016, physically and through digital download, before being released on vinyl on July 8, 2016, by Milan Records. Sia composed an original song for the film titled "Waving Goodbye". On May 24, 2016, at the Cannes Soundtrack 2016 awards, Cliff Martinez was recognized best composer of the Cannes film festival for his soundtrack to The Neon Demon.

Refn's nephew (and actress Brigitte Nielsen's son) Julian Winding contributed two tracks: "Demon Dance" and "Mine", the latter performed by his band Sweet Tempest. An album of songs selected by Refn that inspired The Neon Demon was released in 2017 under the title The Wicked Die Young.

== Release ==
In November 2015, Amazon Studios acquired distribution rights to the film in the United States, in partnership with Broad Green Pictures. The Jokers distributed the film in France. Scanbox Entertainment distributed the film in Denmark.

The film had its world premiere at the 2016 Cannes Film Festival on May 20, 2016, before it was released in France on June 8, 2016. The film was then released in Denmark on June 9, followed by the wide release in the United States on June 24, 2016.

The film was released on DVD and Blu-ray on September 27, 2016.

== Critical response ==
Metacritic review
breakdown (unweighted)

Positive
16 (36%)
Mixed
17 (38%)
Negative
12 (27%)

The Neon Demon received a polarized response from critics. Much like Refn's previous film, Only God Forgives, the film received both boos and a standing ovation during its premiere at Cannes Film Festival. It holds a 59% approval rating on review aggregator website Rotten Tomatoes, based on 263 reviews, with an average rating of 6.1/10. The site's consensus reads, "The Neon Demon is seductively stylish, but Nicolas Winding Refn's assured eye can't quite compensate for an underdeveloped plot and thinly written characters." On Metacritic, the film has a score of 51 out of 100, based on 45 critics, indicating "mixed or average reviews".

Writing a four-star review in The Guardian, Mark Kermode said it was "a film driven by the same guilty pleasures that have long underpinned Refn's work", and had particular praise for the performance of Malone. Robbie Collin of The Daily Telegraph gave the film five out of five stars, stating, "When the film reaches its logical end point, Refn just keeps pushing, and eventually lands on a sequence so jaw-dropping – almost certainly a sly, glossy-magazine refashioning of Luis Buñuel and Salvador Dali's groundbreaking surrealist short Un Chien Andalou – that all you can do is howl or cheer." Tirdad Derakhshani, writing for The Philadelphia Inquirer, called Refn a "bold visionary artist... able to revel in the culture of instant gratification while also subjecting it to critique", giving the film three and a half out of four stars and calling it a "brutal masterpiece". Rene Rodriguez of The Miami Herald wrote positively of the film's visuals and experimental filmmaking, writing, "To complain that The Neon Demon lacks substance or that it doesn't have anything to say about our cultural obsession with beauty is to miss the crazy, cracked pageant unfolding in front of you. Not all movies are intended to be read like books; some are meant to be experienced," going on to call it a "film that is guaranteed to elicit strong reactions." He awarded the film three out of four stars. The writer Natasha Stagg interpreted the film through René Girard's theory of mimetic desire, and speculated that its box office failure was due to its substance being "too close to its own target".

Owen Gleiberman of Variety gave the film a mixed review: "A horror film is what The Neon Demon is (sort of). It’s set in the Los Angeles fashion world, and it’s the kind of movie in which models look like mannequins that look like slasher-film corpses, and corpses look like love objects. Beauty mingles with mangled flesh, and each fastidiously slick image seems to have come out of Twin Peaks: Fire Walk with Me or The Shining or a very sick version of a Calvin Klein commercial. Every scene, every shot, every line of dialogue, every pause is so hypnotically composed, so luxuriously overdeliberate, that the audience can't help but assume that Refn knows exactly what he's doing – that he's setting us up for the kill. He is, but not if you're on the lookout for a movie that makes sense. (Oh, that.)" Todd McCarthy of The Hollywood Reporter gave the film a negative review and called it "[a] stultifyingly vapid, ponderously paced allegorical critique of the modeling world whose seethingly jealous inhabitants can't wait to literally chew each other up and spit each other out". Glenn Kenny of The New York Times criticized the film as "ridiculous and puerile," and opined, "Mr. Refn composes striking images, but they're all secondhand: faux Fellini, faux David Lynch and so on." The Telegraph's Tim Robey deemed The Neon Demon the "most offensive film of the year," specifically citing its necrophilia sequence as exploitative, though he conceded it is not "any fault of Malone’s, who commits herself utterly to making it an anguished, desperate, if inevitably revolting minute or so of screen time. It’s a question of context, and how this scene – which stands alone, advancing nothing in the overall arc of the story, and is one of very few not to feature Fanning – slots into the film’s overall thesis."

The French film magazine Cahiers du cinéma named The Neon Demon the third-best film of 2016.

== Sources ==
- Refn, Nicolas Winding; Fanning, Elle (2016). The Neon Demon (Blu-ray audio commentary). Broadgreen Pictures.
