= Daniel Kaluuya =

English actor (born 1989)

- Kaluuya in 2026
- Born: 24 February 1989 (age 37); London, England
- Occupations: Actor; writer; director; producer
- Years active: 2006–present
- Works: Full list
- Awards: Full list

Daniel Kaluuya (/kəˈluːjə/; born 24 February 1989) is an English actor. His work encompasses both screen and stage, and his accolades include an Academy Award, two BAFTAs, two Actor Awards, and a Golden Globe, in addition to nominations for a Laurence Olivier Award and an Emmy Award. In 2021, he was named among the 100 most influential people in the world by Time magazine.

Kaluuya began his acting career as a teenager in improvisational theatre. He played Posh Kenneth in the first two seasons of the television series Skins (2007–2009); he also co-wrote some of the episodes. Kaluuya drew praise for his leading performance in Sucker Punch at the Royal Court Theatre in 2010. He went on to gain attention for his television roles in Psychoville (2009–2011), The Fades (2011), and the Black Mirror episode "Fifteen Million Merits" (2011). He also had supporting roles in the films Johnny English Reborn (2011), Kick-Ass 2 (2013), and Sicario (2015).

In 2017, Kaluuya had his breakthrough starring in Jordan Peele's horror film Get Out, which garnered him a nomination for the Academy Award for Best Actor. This was followed by roles in Ryan Coogler's superhero film Black Panther (2018), Steve McQueen's crime drama Widows (2018), Peele's horror film Nope (2022), and Sony Pictures Animation's animated superhero film Spider-Man: Across the Spider-Verse (2023). For his portrayal of Black Panther Party leader Fred Hampton in the biopic Judas and the Black Messiah (2021), he won the BAFTA and Academy Award for Best Supporting Actor. He has since co-directed the drama The Kitchen (2023).

== Early life and education ==
Kaluuya was born on 24 February 1989 in London to Ugandan parents, who are Basoga and Baganda from Makindye Division. His mother raised him on a council estate in Camden Town, along with an older sister. His father lived in Balaka, Malawi, and they had no contact until he was 14. Kaluuya attended Torriano Primary School, and St Aloysius' College, Highgate. He subsequently took A-level History, Drama and Biology at Camden School for Girls in its co-educational sixth-form.

Kaluuya wrote his first play at the age of nine, after which he began performing improvisational theatre. He began acting as a child at his local Anna Scher Theatre School and WAC Arts.

== Career ==
=== 2006–2016: Early theater roles andSkins ===
Kaluuya appeared in his first credited acting role in 2006 as Reece in the BBC's controversial drama Shoot the Messenger. Kaluuya then joined the original cast of Skins as Posh Kenneth; he was also a contributing writer on the first two seasons of the series, as well as the head writer of the episodes titled "Jal" and "Thomas".

After Skins, Kaluuya appeared as a guest star in many popular television series such as Silent Witness, the Doctor Who special "Planet of the Dead", and Lewis. He has also appeared in the sketch show That Mitchell and Webb Look twice and as fan favourite character "Parking Pataweyo" in the sketch show Harry & Paul. Kaluuya also voiced a character in the BBC Radio 4 sitcom Sneakiepeeks. In 2009, he became a regular cast member in the ITV comedy FM. At the end of 2009, the Screen International Magazine picked Kaluuya out in their annual report as a UK Star of Tomorrow.

In 2010, Kaluuya played the lead role in Roy Williams' Sucker Punch at the Royal Court Theatre in London; Kaluuya won rave reviews for his performance and he won both the Evening Standard Award and Critics' Circle Theatre Award for Outstanding Newcomer. From 2009 to 2011, he portrayed Michael "Tea Leaf" Fry in the dark BBC comedy Psychoville. Between 2011 and 2013, Kaluuya appeared in several short films, most notably in Daniel Mulloy's Baby, which premiered at the Sundance Film Festival, and went on to win the Best Short Film Award at the Edinburgh International Film Festival, as well as the Best Short Film Award at the British Independent Film Awards. In 2011, he appeared in the sequel to the 2003 film Johnny English, titled Johnny English Reborn, as Agent Tucker. Also in 2011, he played the role of Mac Armstrong in BBC3's supernatural drama series The Fades. In 2013, he appeared in the superhero comedy film Kick Ass 2. In 2015, he portrayed an FBI Agent in Denis Villeneuve's thriller film Sicario.

Kaluuya played one of the lead characters opposite Jessica Brown Findlay in "Fifteen Million Merits", an episode of the anthology series Black Mirror, for which he received positive reviews from critics. The episode originally premiered on Channel 4 in 2011, but gained popularity after it was subsequently released on Netflix in the United States. It was his performance in Black Mirror that attracted the attention of Jordan Peele, who later cast him in Get Out, which proved to be his breakthrough role.

=== 2017–2019: Breakthrough with Get Out ===
Kaluuya's performance in Get Out, which was released in cinemas on 24 February 2017, attracted significant critical acclaim. Steven Gaydos of Variety wrote that "the terror, tension, humor, and fury of this powerfully effective cinematic balancing act all rests on the shoulders of this brilliant young British actor who communicates universal anxieties without ever losing the essential home address of his beleaguered African-American hero." Richard Lawson of Vanity Fair called Kaluuya's performance a "masterful, telling piece of acting." For his performance, he received numerous accolades, including an Academy Award nomination for Best Actor. He also received nominations for a BAFTA Award, Critics' Choice Award, Golden Globe Award, and SAG Award for his role. In 2018, he received the BAFTA Rising Star Award. In December 2016, Kaluuya was cast in the Marvel Cinematic Universe film Black Panther. The film was released on 16 February 2018, in the United States. Kaluuya also had a large role in the heist film Widows (2018), and starred in the road trip/crime movie Queen & Slim (2019), opposite Jodie Turner-Smith.

In 2018, he joined the voice cast of the BBC and Netflix's miniseries Watership Down. In October 2019, it was announced that Kaluuya was to produce a feature film based on the children's television show Barney & Friends through his newly formed production company 59%, alongside Mattel Films. According to Kaluuya, the Barney film would "surprise audiences and subvert expectations." In February 2025, it was announced that Ayo Edebiri was in talks to star in and write the film for A24.

=== 2020–present: Career expansion ===
In 2020, Kaluuya was announced to produce and star in an adaptation of Femi Fadugba's debut novel The Upper World at Netflix. In 2021, he starred as revolutionary socialist Fred Hampton in the biographical drama Judas and the Black Messiah. His performance in the film was lauded by critics, winning the Academy Award for Best Supporting Actor, BAFTA Award for Best Actor in a Supporting Role, Critics' Choice Movie Award for Best Supporting Actor, Golden Globe Award for Best Supporting Actor – Motion Picture and Screen Actors Guild Award for Outstanding Performance by a Male Actor in a Supporting Role; becoming the only performer that year to win all five major film awards. At age 32, Daniel Kaluuya became the seventh-youngest Academy Award Best Supporting Actor winner.

In early 2021, Kaluuya was cast in Peele's sci-fi horror Nope, alongside Keke Palmer and Steven Yeun. The film released on 22 July 2022 to positive reviews. Due to scheduling conflicts with Nope, it was announced that Kaluuya will not be reprising his role as W'Kabi in Black Panther sequel, Black Panther: Wakanda Forever. In April, Kaluuya hosted an episode of Saturday Night Live, with musical guest St. Vincent. Kaluuya was also included in Time's 2021 list of the 100 most influential people in the world.

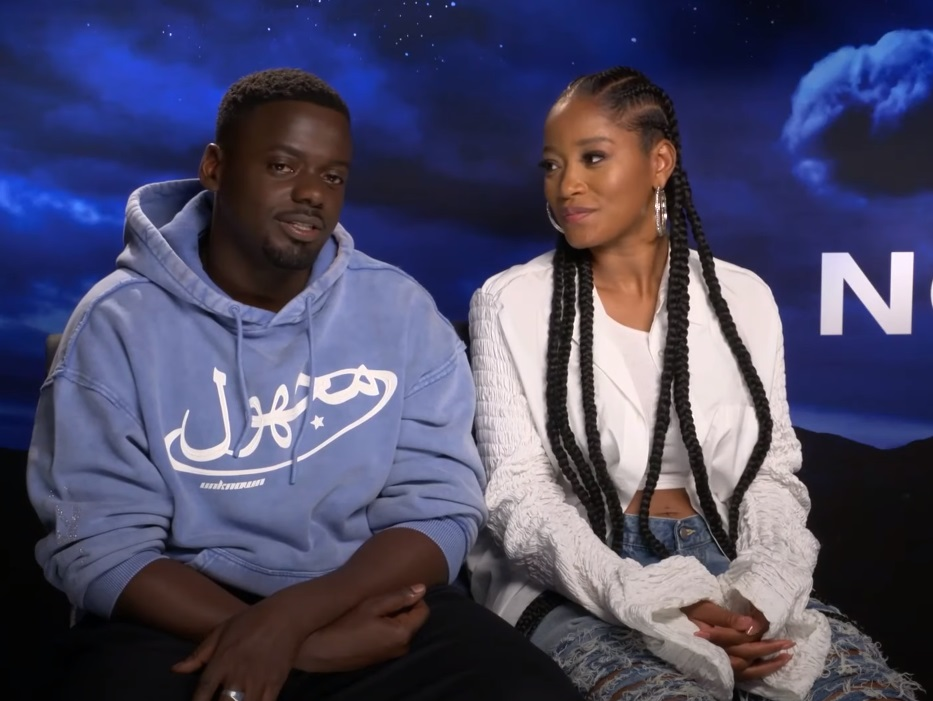
Kaluuya and Nope co-star Keke Palmer in 2022.

In March 2022, it was revealed that Kaluuya was writing a dystopian drama for Netflix, titled The Kitchen, with Kibwe Tavares set to direct. The drama will star Kane Robinson and Jedaiah Bannerman, and is being co-written by Joe Murtagh, and executive-produced by Michael Fassbender. In August 2023, the British Film Institute announced that the film would have its premiere as the closing gala of the 67th London Film Festival on 15 October 2023. The Kitchen released on Netflix on 19 January 2024.

In May 2022, it was announced that Kaluuya was the narrator for Amazon Prime's sports docuseries All or Nothing: Arsenal, which followed English Premier League side Arsenal behind the scenes throughout their 2021–22 season. In November 2022, Kaluuya was confirmed to portray Hobart "Hobie" Brown / Spider-Punk in Spider-Man: Across the Spider-Verse. In October 2024, a statue of Kaluuya was erected in London to honour his work in Get Out. In July 2025, it was reported that Kaluuya would co-write the screenplay for an animated Spider-Punk spin-off film.

Kaluuya returned to film starring in the Chris Rock directed showbiz satire Misty Green which debuted at the 2026 Toronto International Film Festival. Owen Gleiberman of Variety described him as giving a "force" of a performance. It was announced that he is set to make his Off-Broadway debut in the Branden Jacobs-Jenkins play Gras at the Park Avenue Armory in 2027.

== Personal life ==
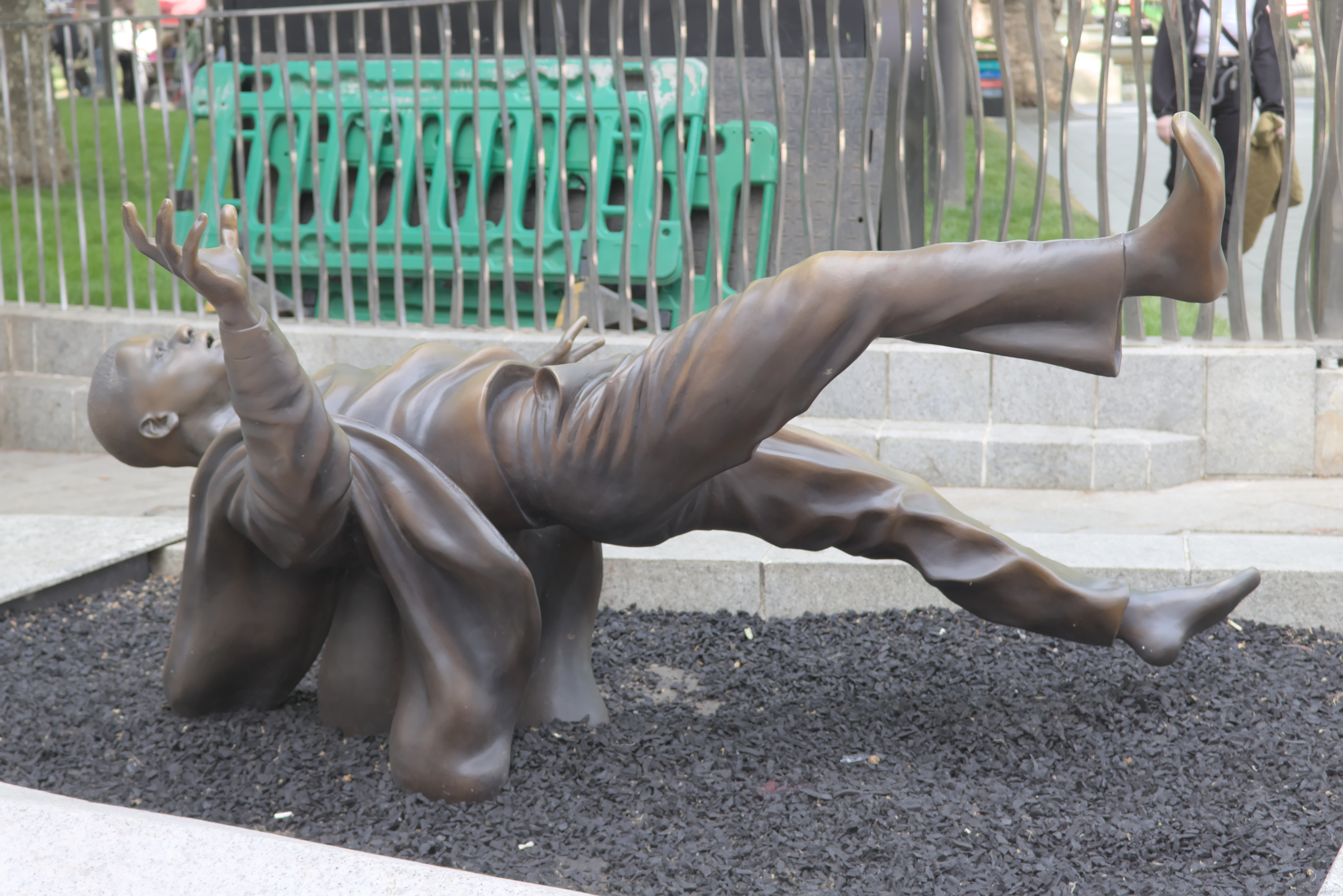
Statue of the character Chris Washington from the 2017 movie Get Out, played by Kaluuya in London's Leicester Square.

Kaluuya lives in West London. He is a supporter of Arsenal, to the extent of referring to Arsenal's North London rivals, Tottenham Hotspur, as the "team who must not be named" and the "Voldemort of the League". In August 2022, Kaluuya featured as narrator in All or Nothing: Arsenal, the docuseries about Arsenal's 2021–22 season. He is a Christian and acknowledged his faith during his Oscar speech. He is the godfather of the son of his former Skins castmate Kaya Scodelario.

In February 2022, it was reported that Kaluuya had "abruptly" fired his agents at the Creative Artists Agency as well as his personal stylist, publicist and multiple assistants. It was reported that he was influenced in these decisions by a person known as "Heir Holiness" who described herself as Kaluuya's "personal manager" and "life strategist" as well as the "Head Mistress" of "The International Alma Mater, Blessed University". She has further claimed to have degrees in holistic health and "Parapsychic Science" from the American Institute of Holistic Theology. Sources told Page Six and Matthew Belloni that she was on set during the filming of Nope and her behavior "caused people on set to be concerned about her influence over" Kaluuya. In a March 2022 article, she denied to Page Six that she knew Kaluuya.

== See also ==
- List of British actors
- List of Academy Award winners and nominees from Great Britain
- List of youngest Academy Award winners for Best Supporting Actor
- List of actors with Academy Award nominations
- List of actors with more than one Academy Award nomination in the acting categories
- List of Black Golden Globe winners and nominees
- List of Golden Globe winners
