= Milan Records =

US record label

- Parent company: Sony Music Entertainment (SME)
- Founded: 1978; 48 years ago
- Founder: Emmanuel Chamboredon
- Distributor: Sony Masterworks
- Country of origin: United States
- Location: Los Angeles, California
- Official website: milanrecords.com

Milan Records is a record label located in Los Angeles, California specializing in film scores and soundtrack albums. In addition, Milan has an electronic catalog which features down-tempo, chillout, and eclectic electronic releases.

In July 2019, Milan was acquired by Sony Masterworks. Coincidentally, Milan was distributed by BMG in the past, which Sony acquired in 2008.

== History ==
Milan Entertainment was founded in 1978 by Emmanuel Chamboredon, who is still the CEO and President of the company. In the 1980s, Milan branched off to include Editions Milan Music and Editions Jade, the brand name under which all spiritual and classical music would fall. Milan Records US was established first in NYC in the late 1980s. It later relocated to Los Angeles, CA. Editions Milan Music became the Milan Records of today, at the forefront of music and film with soundtrack releases like Pan's Labyrinth (2006), Flags of Our Fathers (2006), The Queen (2006), The Secret in Their Eyes (2009), Resident Evil: Afterlife (2010), and The Three Musketeers: D'Artagnan (2023), along with new artists releases, in the electronic genre, Emilie Simon or in the bluegrass genre, The Devil Makes Three.

Milan Records released “Kick Back” as part of soundtrack for Chainsaw Man in the United States. The single became the first song with Japanese lyrics to be certified gold by the Recording Industry Association of America (RIAA).

== Discography ==
Soundtracks

- 12 Rounds
- 12 Strong
- 28 Years Later
- 2067
- The 4400
- The A-Team
- Aeon Flux
- After the Wedding
- Akira
- Alex Rider: Operation Stormbreaker
- Alfie
- Alien: Covenant
- Alita: Battle Angel
- Alone in the Dark
- Alpha Dog
- Army of the Dead
- The Angry Birds Movie
- The Angry Birds Movie 2
- Apt Pupil
- Atlantics
- Backdraft
- The Bad News Bears
- Bad Santa
- Bad Santa 2
- Bad Trip
- Barnyard
- Battle for Haditha
- Battle Royale
- Beavis and Butthead Do America
- Black Swan
- Bloodrayne
- Bloodshot
- Bob's Burgers
- BoJack Horseman
- The Boss Baby
- Brazil
- Breakfast on Pluto
- The Brothers Grimm
- Captain Underpants: The First Epic Movie
- Carrie (2026)
- Chainsaw Man
- Challengers
- Chef
- Child's Play
- Clockstoppers
- The Condemned
- Cooties
- The Comebacks
- Congo
- The Counterfeiters
- Cowboy Bebop
- Cowboy Bebop: The Movie
- Crank
- Crank: High Voltage
- The Croods
- Cutthroat Island
- Dance Flick
- Dark Phoenix
- Date Movie
- Dead Silence
- Deadpool
- Deadpool 2
- Death Sentence
- Death Wish
- Disaster Movie
- Dodgeball: A True Underdog Story
- Dogville / Manderlay
- Dolls
- Doogal
- Doom
- Double Dragon
- Dragonball: Evolution
- The Elephant Man
- Elite Squad
- The Emoji Movie
- Epic
- Epic Movie
- EuroTrip
- Event Horizon
- Factotum
- Family Guy
- Fantastic Four
- Fantasy Island
- Flags of Our Fathers
- Flow
- Fugitive Pieces
- Gamer
- The General's Daughter
- Gettysburg
- The Gettysburg Address
- Ghost
- Ghostbusters (2016)
- Ghost in the Shell (1995)
- Ghost in the Shell (2017)
- Good Burger
- The Green Inferno
- The Happening
- Hard Rain
- Harsh Times
- A Haunted House
- A Haunted House 2
- Hell's Paradise: Jigokuraku
- Home
- Horton Hears a Who!
- The Host
- Hostel
- Hostel: Part II
- Hotel Rwanda
- Hotel Transylvania 2
- Hotel Transylvania 3: Summer Vacation
- House of the Dead
- I (Heart) Huckabees
- Independence Day: Resurgence
- Infamous
- The Interview
- Into Great Silence
- The Island
- It's Always Sunny in Philadelphia
- Jackass: The Movie
- Jackass 3D
- Jackass Number Two
- Jackass Presents: Bad Grandpa
- Jigsaw
- Jimmy Neutron: Boy Genius
- Jujutsu Kaisen
- Keyhole
- Kill La Kill
- Killer Joe
- The King's Speech
- Knowing
- Lara Croft: Tomb Raider
- Lara Croft: Tomb Raider – The Cradle of Life
- The Last Airbender
- Lazarus
- Letters from Iwo Jima
- Little Children
- Little Witch Academia
- The Love Guru
- The Man in the Iron Mask
- The Manchurian Candidate
- March of the Penguins
- Marilyn Hotchkiss' Ballroom Dancing & Charm School
- The Marine
- Match Point
- Max Payne
- Meet the Spartans
- Melinda and Melinda
- The Menu
- Miami Vice
- Midway
- Millennium Actress
- Millions
- Mr. Brooks
- Mr. Nobody
- Mr. Peabody & Sherman
- My Hero Academia: Heroes Rising
- My Hero Academia: World Heroes' Mission
- Nagasaki: Memories of My Son
- Naked Lunch
- Nick of Time (1995)
- Ninja Scroll
- No One Knows About Persian Cats
- One Last Kiss
- Old Fashioned
- Pan's Labyrinth
- Paprika
- Paranoia Agent
- Parasite
- Payback
- Penguins of Madagascar
- Perfect Blue
- Predators
- The Predator
- The Prize Winner of Defiance, Ohio
- Promare
- Prometheus
- The Purge
- The Purge: Anarchy
- The Purge: Election Year
- The Queen
- Queer
- Rambo
- Rambo: First Blood
- Rambo: First Blood Part II
- Rambo III
- Rambo: Last Blood
- Rampage
- Rat Race
- Red Hill
- Resident Evil
- Resident Evil: Afterlife
- Resident Evil: Apocalypse
- Resident Evil: The Final Chapter
- Resident Evil: Extinction
- Resident Evil: Retribution
- The Revenant
- Robots
- The Rugrats Movie
- Rugrats Go Wild
- Rugrats in Paris: The Movie
- Sausage Party
- Saltburn
- Saw
- Saw II
- Saw III
- Saw IV
- Saw V
- Saw VI
- Saw 3D
- Scary Movie
- Scary Movie 2
- Scary Movie 3
- Scary Movie 4
- Scary Movie 5
- Scream
- Scream 2
- Scream 3
- Scream 4
- The Secret in Their Eyes (2009)
- The Secret in Their Eyes (2015)
- See No Evil
- Sky Captain and the World of Tomorrow
- Sonic the Hedgehog 3
- Soul Plane
- South Park: Bigger, Longer, and Uncut
- Spider-Man: Into the Spiderverse
- Spirited Away
- The SpongeBob SquarePants Movie
- The SpongeBob Movie: Search for SquarePants
- The SpongeBob Movie: Sponge Out of Water
- Spy Kids
- Spy Kids 2: The Island of Lost Dreams
- Spy Kids 3-D: Game Over
- Spy Kids: All the Time in the World
- Stargate
- Stargate SG-1
- Step Sisters
- Stomp the Yard
- Stoned
- Strange Wilderness
- Street Fighter: The Legend of Chun-Li
- Superhero Movie
- The Talented Mr. Ripley
- Tank Girl
- Team America: World Police
- Terminator: Dark Fate
- Terminator Genisys
- Tokyo Godfathers
- Tomb Raider
- Transformers
- Transformers: Age of Extinction
- Transformers: Dark of the Moon
- Transformers: The Last Knight
- Transformers: Revenge of the Fallen
- Trolls
- The Truman Show
- The Three Musketeers: D'Artagnan (2023)
- The Wicked Die Young
- Tsotsi
- Turbo
- The Usual Suspects
- Vampires Suck
- We Were Soldiers
- Wedding Crashers
- The Weather Man
- What Just Happened?
- The Wheel of Time
- The Wild Thornberrys Movie
- Willard
- The Winter in Lisbon
- Without a Paddle
- The Wolverine
- Wonderful Days
- The World's Fastest Indian
- X-Men: Apocalypse
- X-Men: Days of Future Past
- X-Men: First Class
- You Got Served
- Zombieland
- Zombieland: Double Tap
- Zoolander
- Zoolander No. 2

Artists and Compilations

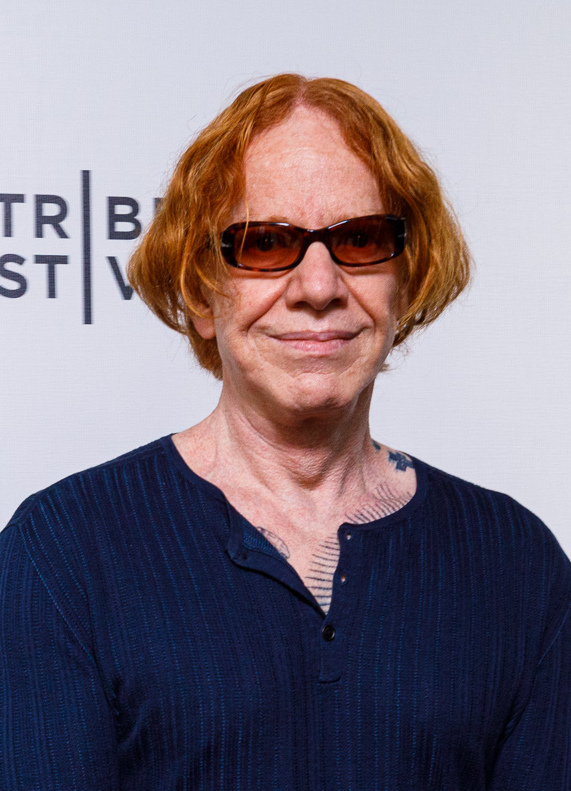
Danny Elfman

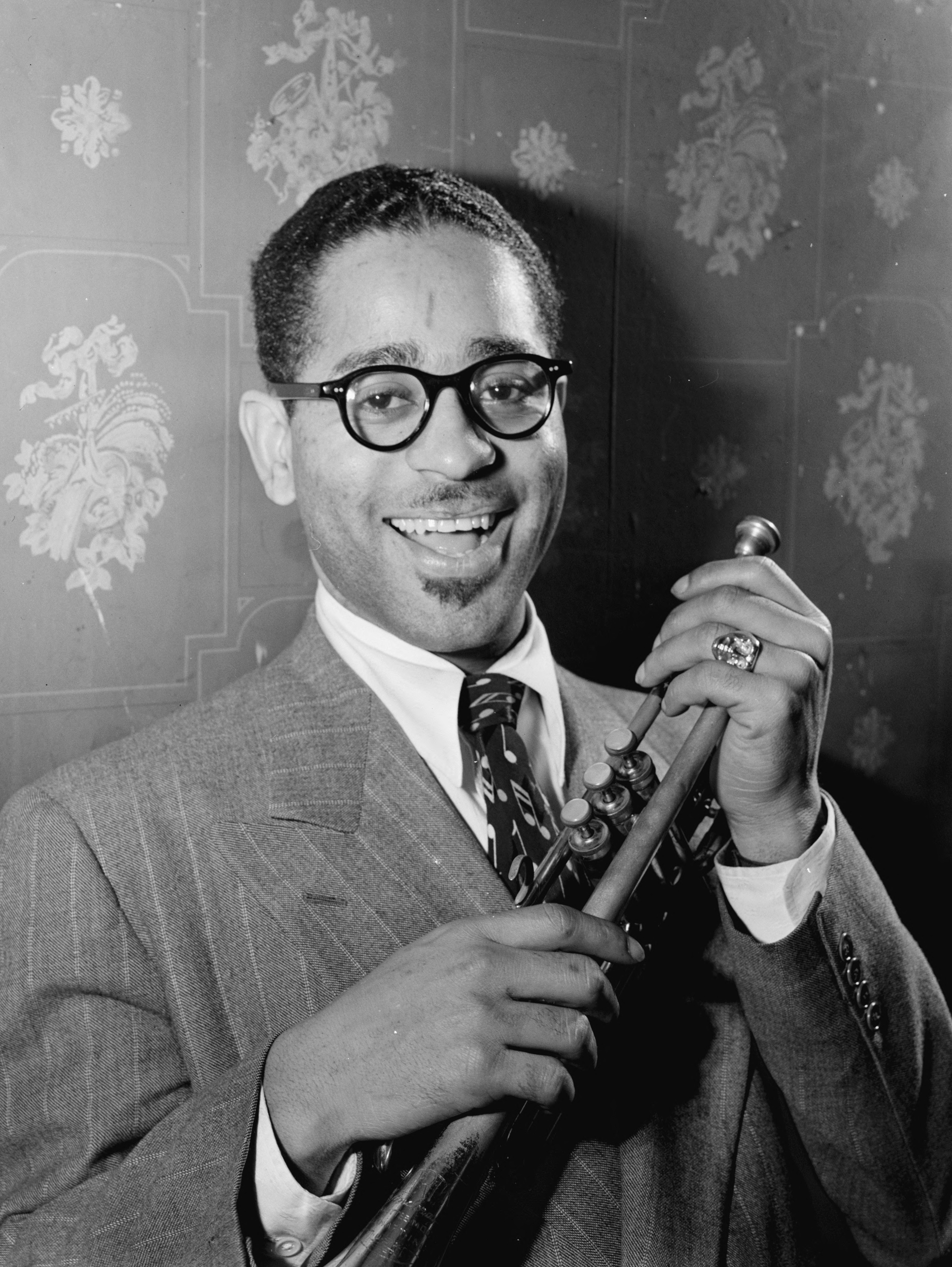
Dizzy Gillespie

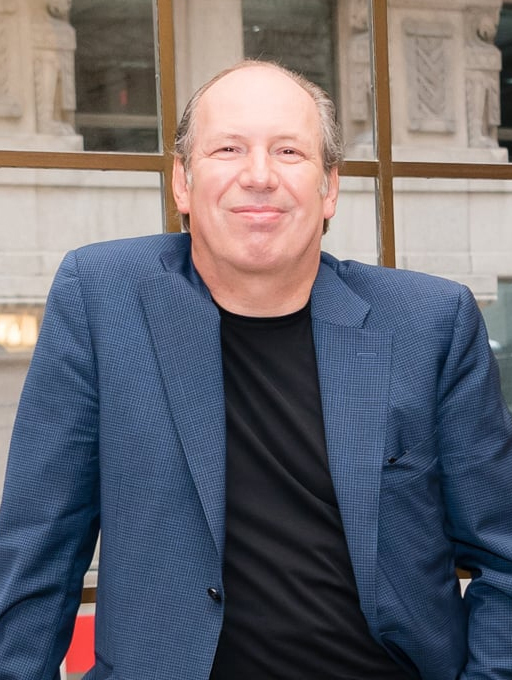
Hans Zimmer

- Alaska In Winter
- Alexa Vega
- Aqua Velvets: Guitar Noir. .ArtDontSleep presents: From LA with Love
- Asia Argento Vs. Antipop
- Ástor Piazzolla
- Ástor Piazzolla "Live at the Montreal Jazz Festival"
- Cliff Martinez
- Clint Mansell
- Danny Elfman
- Dizzy Gillespie
- Elliot Goldenthal
- Emilie Simon
- Emily Jane White
- Gabriel Yared
- Hans Zimmer
- Howard Shore
- James Horner
- Kenneth Lampl
- Lalo Schifrin
- Lorne Balfe
- Max Richter
- Marco Beltrami
- Nicholas Britell
- Richard Galliano
- Ryuichi Sakamoto
- Santino
- Stefano Lentini
- Tex Avery
- The Aqua Velvets
- The Devil Makes Three
- The Mint Chicks
- Hikaru Utada
- West Indian Girl
