= The Secret in Their Eyes (soundtrack) =

2010 film soundtrack album

The Secret in Their Eyes (Music from the Motion Picture)

Film score by Federico Jusid and Emilio Kauderer
- Released: 13 April 2010
- Recorded: 2009
- Genre: Film score
- Length: 46:44
- Label: Milan

Federico Jusid chronology
| Che, A New Man (2009) | The Secret in Their Eyes (2009) | I Want to Be a Soldier (2010) |

Emilio Kauderer chronology
| Verano amargo (2007) | The Secret in Their Eyes (2009) | Love Equation (2010) |

The Secret in Their Eyes (Music from the Motion Picture) is the film score to the 2009 film The Secret in Their Eyes directed by Juan José Campanella. The score is composed by Federico Jusid and Emilio Kauderer and was released through Milan Records on 13 April 2010.

== Development ==
The original score is composed by Federico Jusid and Emilio Kauderer. Emilio began writing the themes at the piano creating orchestral demos to represent the recording and sent the demos to Campanella for his feedback, so that he could orchestrate and adapt the music for the film. Campanella was actively involved in the musical decisions from the onset and provided freedom to the composers. During their initial discussions, Campanella proposed two narrative currents: the thriller and the love story.

Emilio wanted to immerse himself in the story and dwell into the characters' heads and focused on the narration. Emilio provided a traditional, orchestral and melodic style for the film's music, and collaborated with his brother Sebastian and Jusid. Emilio considered it to be a team effort for the conceptualization and production of the themes, melodies and soundscape. Once the themes were established, the corresponding demos were made so that Campanella could choose from the different options where each piece of music contributed to the scene.

The composers wrote few piano and violin solos to establish the romantic and tender moments, while the action sequences were underlined by percussive sounds. The orchestra was recorded in Sofia, Bulgaria and was performed by the Bulgarian Symphony Orchestra while post-production was done in Spain.

== Release ==
The soundtrack was released internationally through Milan Records on 13 April 2010.

== Reception ==
Jonathan Holland of Variety wrote "Federico Jusid’s score aptly tends toward the intimate and lyrical, though with occasional bursts of the stately." Danny King of The Film Stage wrote "beautifully scored by Federico Jusid and Emilio Kauderer".

== Track listing ==
| No. | Title | Length |
|---|---|---|
| 1. | "Her Eyes" | 1:46 |
| 2. | "The Doubt" | 3:01 |
| 3. | "Suspicious Photo" | 2:42 |
| 4. | "Passion" | 1:12 |
| 5. | "Sandoval's Choice" | 1:56 |
| 6. | "Crime Scene" | 2:03 |
| 7. | "The Train Leaves" | 2:36 |
| 8. | "Seeking Morales" | 1:05 |
| 9. | "In the Cage" | 3:24 |
| 10. | "He's Back" | 1:30 |
| 11. | "Finding Sandoval" | 1:25 |
| 12. | "Main Theme" | 1:16 |
| 13. | "The Elevator" | 1:46 |
| 14. | "The Letters" | 1:46 |
| 15. | "Liliana's Theme" | 0:44 |
| 16. | "The Bad News" | 0:57 |
| 17. | "The Detainees" | 0:47 |
| 18. | "Liliana's Music Box" | 1:06 |
| 19. | "Farewell" | 1:41 |
| 20. | "Gomez" | 1:34 |
| 21. | "The Call" | 2:22 |
| 22. | "Unwrapping the Truth" | 1:09 |
| 23. | "The Doubt" (Reprise) | 8:56 |
| Total length: | | 46:44 |

== Accolades ==
| Awards | Category | Recipient(s) | Result | Ref. |
|---|---|---|---|---|
| Argentinian Academy of Arts & Cinema | Best Original Score | Federico Jusid (Note: Despite three composers were involved, Jusid had been credited as the sole composer for the award nominations) | Won | |
| Argentine Film Critics Association | Best Music | Federico Jusid | Won | |
| Clarín Awards | Best Original Score | Federico Jusid | Won | |
| Goya Awards | Best Original Score | Federico Jusid | Nominated | |
| Havana Film Festival | Best Original Score | Federico Jusid | Won | |
