= Femi Fadugba =

British writer and physicist (born 1967)

- Born: Olufemi Fadugba; 1987 (age 38–39); Togo
- Education: University of Pennsylvania; University of Oxford
- Occupations: Writer and physicist
- Writing career
- Notable work: The Upper World (2021)

Femi Fadugba (born 1987) is a British writer and physicist based in London. His first book, The Upper World, was published by Penguin Random House in 2021. It was turned into a film by Netflix, starring Daniel Kaluuya.

== Early life and education ==
Fadugba was born to Nigerian parents in Togo during a civil war. His father was an interpreter for the United Nations. Fadugba spent his early childhood moving around, including a stint in the United States, before settling in England at age nine, where he attended a boarding school in Somerset. As his parents frequently traveled for work, he would stay with his aunt in Peckham when not at school. Fadugba was encouraged by his school caretaker to pursue a career in physics. In an interview with The Guardian, Fadugba explained that at the age of 11 his caretaker gave him Quantum Physics for Dummies.

Faduga completed a master's degree in materials science at St Catherine's College, Oxford, University of Oxford, where he was awarded the Rolls-Royce Armourers and Brasiers' Company Prize. His third year project specialised in quantum computing. He moved to the University of Pennsylvania for graduate studies, where he worked toward a Master of Public Administration as a Thouron Scholar.

== Career ==
Fadugba returned to the United Kingdom, where he worked in a solar finance company. In 2011 he was selected by the Rare Rising Stars competition as the "UK’s Best Black Student".

Fadugba's book, The Upper World, combines the everyday life of young people living in Peckham, South London, with time travel and quantum physics. He was motivated to write it after his friends became increasingly curious about the mysteries and miracles of physics. Fadugba has described physics as a combination of maths and metaphors. The Guardian described The Upper World as a "uniquely thrilling, heart-wrenching young adult novel". After a 15-way auction, the book was published by Penguin Random House in August 2021.

Almost immediately after Fadugba sent the manuscript to the publishers, it was leaked to Hollywood. Faduba was approached by Netflix, Monkeypaw Productions and Plan B Entertainment for the film rights. The rights were won by Netflix, and the film will be produced by and star Daniel Kaluuya.

== Personal life ==
Fadugba is married to an American doctor.
