= The Wicked Die Young =

Music album (2017)

Soundtrack album by various artists
- Released: April 14, 2017
- Label: Milan
- Producer: Nicolas Winding Refn

The Wicked Die Young is a music album that was released in 2017 as a companion piece to the movie The Neon Demon directed by Nicolas Winding Refn. Winding Refn gave a number of interviews about the album, telling Elizabeth Aubrey “The fourteen tracks on this compilation represent the various ideas I had while preparing The Neon Demon. Each song represents a specific emotion…since I wanted my film to be both a horror film and a melodrama with camp, glitter and vulgarity, as well as a comedy and of course a little science fiction, all these various tracks made me able to step into a parallel world to tell the story.” In an interview with FACT in 2015, Refn explained why integrating music into moving image is so important for him. "Even when I shoot films I play music on set, in between takes", he said. "It helps you convey emotion better for actors - and brings people to a place of being that helps their performance."

The album contains exclusive tracks from Drive artists Electric Youth as well as the Neon Demon composer (and long-time score of other Nicolas Winding Refn films) Martinez, plus Refn's nephew, Julian Winding, who also had an electronic number on the soundtrack. The Wicked Die Young also has a number of works from Suicide, Giorgio Moroder, Pino Donaggio, Lynsey de Paul, Dionne Warwick and Sparks, among others.

== Track listing ==
- A1 Electric Youth – "Good Blood"
- A2 Lynsey De Paul – "Won't Somebody Dance With Me"
- A3 Suicide – "Cheree"
- A4 999 – "Homicide"
- A5 The Heartbreakers – "Pirate Love"
- B1 Dionne Warwick – "Theme From Valley Of The Dolls"
- B2 Tommy Seebach – "Bubble Sex"
- B3 Amanda Lear – "Follow Me"
- C1 Giorgio Moroder – "Knights In White Satin"
- C2 Sparks – "The Number One Song in Heaven"
- C3 Cliff Martinez – "Becoming"
- D1 Pino Donaggio – "Dressed To Kill: The Shower"
- D2 Claudio Gizzi – "End Of A Myth"
- D3 Julian Winding – "When You Want To Hurt Someone"
