= Kibwe Tavares =

British film maker and architect

- Born: South London
- Education: Bartlett School of Architecture
- Occupation: Filmmaker
- Awards: RIBA President's Medals Students Award

Kibwe Tavares (/ˈkɪbweɪ təˈvɑːrɛs/) is a British filmmaker and architect. He is the co-founder of Factory Fifteen, a studio that uses animation and emerging technologies to understand and explain the built environment. His first short, Robots of Brixton, was awarded the 2011 Royal Institute of British Architects President's Medal. He is a 2020 TED Senior Fellow.

== Early life and education ==
Tavares was born in South London in the 1980s. He studied architecture at the Bartlett School of Architecture. His first short, Robots of Brixton, which was the outcome of his master's degree, was awarded the Sundance Film Festival Special Jury Award. The film explored the relationship between architecture, class and race, and showed Brixton as a disregarded area populated by London's future robotic workforce. It was awarded the Royal Institute of British Architects President's Medal in 2011. His second film was Jonah, which was inspired by The Old Man and the Sea and one of the official Sundance Film Festival selections. Jonah explored the impact of tourism on Zanzibar.

== Career ==
In 2011 Tavares and other Bartlett graduates established Factory Fifteen, a studio that uses animation and emerging technologies to understand and explain the built environment. Factory Fifteen have worked with Samsung, Film4 and Formula One.

Tavares was selected as a TED Senior Fellow in 2020.

Tavares' first short film, Robots Of Brixton (a thesis project for his master’s degree) debuted in 2012, leading him to be nominated for the Grand Jury Prize and winning the Special Jury Prize at the Sundance Film Festival. His second short, Jonah (2013), also premiered at Sundance, where it was nominated for the Grand Jury Prize. His third short, Robot + Scarecrow, debuted at the BFI London Film Festival in 2017, where it was nominated for the Best Short Film Award. In 2020, Kibwe directed the original story Aisha and Abhaya for the Royal Opera House, and executive produced the acclaimed adaptation of Malorie Blackman’s book series Nought’s and Crosses for BBC One. Kibwe's feature directorial debut, The Kitchen, had its World Premiere at the closing night of the BFI London Film Festival.

=== Filmography ===
- 2012 Robots of Brixton
- 2013 Jonah
- 2017 Robot + Scarecrow
- 2018 Time Machine
- 2023 The Kitchen

=== Awards and honours ===
His awards and honours include:

- 2011 Royal Institute of British Architects President's Medal
- 2011 Sundance Film Festival Special Jury Prize
- 2012 Screen International Stars of Tomorrow
- 2013 TED fellow
- 2015 Saatchi & Saatchi New Directors Showcase
- 2020 TED Senior fellow
