= Mr. Nobody (soundtrack) =

Film score by Pierre Van Dormael
- Released: January 26, 2010
- Genre: Film score
- Label: Mogno Music
- Producer: Pierre Van Dormael, Philippe de Cock

Mr. Nobody is a film score by Belgian musician Pierre Van Dormael, released on January 26, 2010, in Belgium, accompanying the 2009 film of the same name, directed by Jaco Van Dormael and starring Jared Leto, Sarah Polley, Diane Kruger, and Linh Dan Pham. Mr. Nobody is the last film of composer Pierre Van Dormael before his death in 2008.

== Background ==
Like Jaco Van Dormael's previous films, the score for Mr. Nobody was written by Pierre Van Dormael. The director did not want the music to be overtly emotional, so he and Pierre chose a minimalist orchestration, more often than not just a single guitar. The score was finished after Pierre was diagnosed with terminal cancer.

At the 2010 Magritte Awards, the film received six awards and Pierre Van Dormael won Best Original Score posthumously.

== Track listing ==
All tracks are written by Pierre Van Dormael.

| No. | Title | Length |
|---|---|---|
| 1. | "Sous les draps" | 2:55 |
| 2. | "Trois petites filles" | 1:47 |
| 3. | "Waltz" | 1:42 |
| 4. | "La nature des peurs" | 1:53 |
| 5. | "Du bout des doigts" | 1:39 |
| 6. | "Le temps immobile" | 2:24 |
| 7. | "Cercles" | 2:35 |
| 8. | "Celui qui n'existe pas" | 0:53 |
| 9. | "Sous les draps" | 1:45 |
| 10. | "Au fond des bois" | 2:28 |

== Personnel ==
Musicians

- Pierre Van Dormael – guitar
- Eric Baeten – violin
- Jean Pierre Borboux – cello
- Cristina Constantinescu – violin
- Stijn Daveniers – cello
- Philippe de Cock – acoustic piano
- Liesbeth de Lombaert – cello
- Peter Despiegelaere – violin
- Véronique Gilis – violin
- Manuel Hermia – flute
- Ivo Lintermans – violin
- Antoine Maisonhaute – violin
- Romain Montfort – cello
- Mark Steylaerts – violin (concertmaster)
- Marian Tache – violin
- Dirk Uten – violin
- Hans Vandaele – cello
- Gudrun Vercampt – violin
- Eva Vermeren – violin
- Inge Walraet – violin

Technical and production

- Pierre Van Dormael – arrangement, production, recording (PVD Studio)
- Philippe de Cock – string arranger, production
- Philippe Delire – recording (ICP Studio)
- Jarek Frankowski – mixing (Acoustic Recordings)
- Olivier Gérard – mixing (Synsound)
- Henri Greindl – mastering
- Dan Lacksman – mixing (Synsound)
- David Minjauw – recording (Dada Studio)
- Stéphane Owen – recording (Yellow Sub Studio)
