= Jodie Turner-Smith =

British actress (born 1986)

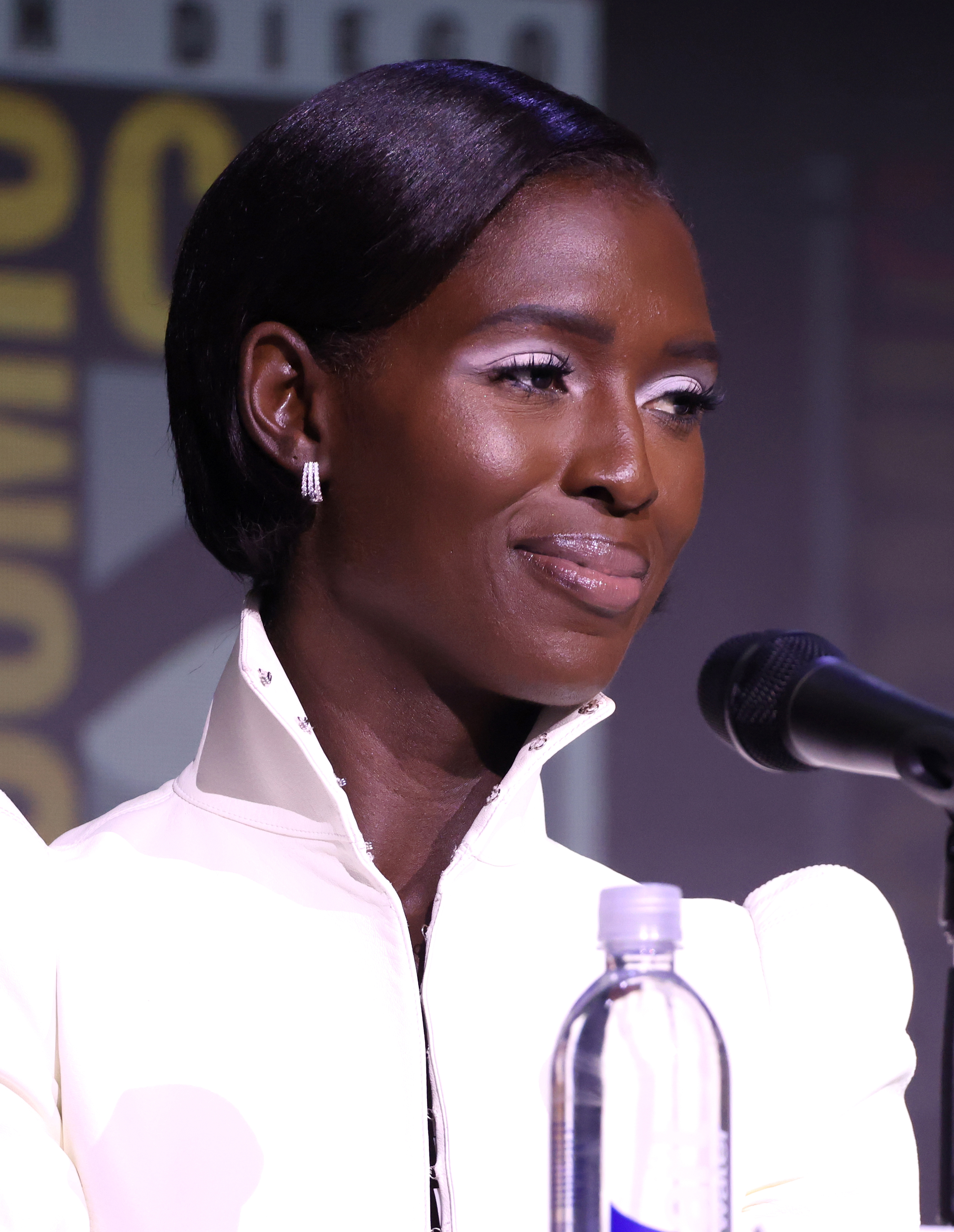
- Turner-Smith at the 2025 San Diego Comic-Con
- Born: 7 September 1986 (age 40); Peterborough, England
- Education: University of Pittsburgh
- Occupation: Actress
- Years active: 2013–present
- Spouse: Joshua Jackson (m. 2019; div. 2025)
- Children: 1

Jodie Turner-Smith (born 7 September 1986) is a British actress. She made her feature film debut in The Neon Demon (2016) and has since acted in Queen & Slim (2019), After Yang (2022), White Noise (2022), and Tron: Ares (2025). She is also known for her television roles in the TNT series The Last Ship (2017), the Apple TV+ series Bad Monkey (2024), the Syfy series Nightflyers (2018), and for portraying the title role in the Channel 5 series Anne Boleyn (2021).

== Early life ==
Turner-Smith was born on 7 September 1986 in Peterborough, England to Jamaican parents; she is the only one of her siblings who was not born in Jamaica. She resided in Peterborough until she was 10 years old. After her parents divorced, she emigrated to the United States with her mother, brother and half-sister, residing in Gaithersburg, Maryland, a suburb of Washington, D.C.

Turner-Smith studied finance at the University of Pittsburgh; she graduated in 2008 and subsequently worked at a bank. She has lived in Los Angeles since 2009.

== Career ==
In 2009, a mutual friend introduced Turner-Smith to musician Pharrell Williams after a N.E.R.D. concert. When she told him she was looking to become a writer, he convinced her to become a model and move to Los Angeles. She made her acting debut in 2013 as a siren in True Blood, which led to numerous minor roles in films and music videos between 2013 and 2017. During this time, she was credited as Jodie Smith. In 2016, she appeared in the music video for Zayn Malik's "Pillowtalk."

Turner-Smith first came to prominence playing Sgt. Azima Kandie in the 2017–2018 season of the TNT series The Last Ship. She had a major role as Melantha Jhirl in the 2018 Syfy/Netflix series Nightflyers. She played Josie in the Cinemax series Jett, which premiered in June 2019, and starred in the 2019 film Queen & Slim opposite Daniel Kaluuya.

In October 2020, it was announced that Turner-Smith would be portraying Queen Anne Boleyn in Anne Boleyn, a three-part drama series on Channel 5, which details the final months of Boleyn's life. Her casting was met with backlash due to her being a Black person. The series premiered in May 2021, with Turner-Smith's performance receiving praise. In January 2021, it was announced that she was cast as Éile, a warrior blessed with the voice of a goddess, in The Witcher: Blood Origin, a six-episode limited series prequel to The Witcher. In April 2021, Netflix announced that she had departed the project due to scheduling conflicts and a change in the production schedule.

Turner-Smith starred in Kogonada's sci-fi drama After Yang alongside Colin Farrell. The film was released in March 2022. In September 2022, she joined the Star Wars Disney+ series The Acolyte. In June 2023, it was announced that Turner-Smith would join the cast of Tron: Ares alongside Jared Leto.

== Personal life ==
Turner-Smith began a relationship with actor Joshua Jackson in October 2018. They married in late 2019 and their daughter was born in April 2020. In October 2023, it was revealed that Turner-Smith had filed for divorce from Jackson. In May 2025, it was reported that the couple had reached a divorce settlement.

== Filmography ==
Key
†	Denotes works that have not yet been released

=== Film ===
Year	Title	Role	Notes	Ref.
2016	The Neon Demon	Roberta Hoffmann's assistant	(Note: Credited as Jodie Smith.)	
2017	Lemon	Beverly		
2017	Newness	Statuesque woman		
2019	Queen & Slim	Angela "Queen" Johnson		
2021	Without Remorse	Karen Greer		
2021	After Yang	Kyra		
2022	White Noise	Winnie Richards		
2022	The Independent	Elisha "Eli" James	Also executive producer	
2023	Murder Mystery 2	Countess Sekou		
2025	A Big Bold Beautiful Journey	GPS' voice	Voice	
2025	Tron: Ares	Athena		
2027	Get Lite †	TBA	Filming	
TBA	Brides †	TBA	Post-production	
TBA	The Turning Door †	(voice)	Post-production	

=== Television ===
Year	Title	Role	Notes	Ref.
2013	True Blood	Siren #2	4 episodes	
2015–2016	Mad Dogs	Angel	2 episodes	
2016	Ice	Lady Rah's masseuse	1 episode	
2017–2018	The Last Ship	Sgt. Azima Kandie	20 episodes	
2018	Nightflyers	Melantha Jhirl	10 episodes	
2019	Jett	Josie	9 episodes	
2021	Anne Boleyn	Anne Boleyn	3 episodes	
2023	Sex Education	God	Recurring role	
2024	Star Wars: The Acolyte	Mother Aniseya	3 episodes	
2024	Bad Monkey	Dragon Queen / Gracie	Main role	
2024–present	The Agency	Sami Zahir	Main role	
2025	Star Wars: Visions	Eno	Voice; episode: "The Bounty Hunters"	

=== Music video appearances ===
Year	Song	Artist	Refs.
2009	"Walkin' on the Moon"	The-Dream feat. Kanye West	
2012	"Black Girls"	Chester French	
2013	"Cool Song No. 2"	MGMT	
2013	"Für Hildegard von Bingen"	Devendra Banhart	
2014	"Dear Diamond"	Blaqstarr feat. Common	
2016	"Pillowtalk"	Zayn Malik	
2016	"Make Me (Cry)"	Noah Cyrus feat. Labrinth	
2023	"You Only Love Me"	Rita Ora	
2026	"Opalite"	Taylor Swift	
