= Queen & Slim =

2019 film directed by Melina Matsoukas

- Theatrical release poster
- Directed by: Melina Matsoukas
- Screenplay by: Lena Waithe
- Story by: James Frey; Lena Waithe
- Produced by: Lena Waithe; Melina Matsoukas; Michelle Knudsen; Andrew Coles; Brad Weston; Pamela Abdy
- Starring: Daniel Kaluuya; Jodie Turner-Smith; Bokeem Woodbine; Chloë Sevigny; Flea; Sturgill Simpson; Indya Moore
- Cinematography: Tat Radcliffe
- Edited by: Pete Beaudreau
- Music by: Devonté Hynes
- Production companies: Entertainment One; 3Blackdot; Makeready; De La Revolución Films; Hillman Grad Productions; Bron Creative
- Distributed by: Universal Pictures
- Release dates: November 14, 2019 (AFI Fest); November 27, 2019 (United States)
- Running time: 132 minutes
- Country: United States
- Language: English
- Budget: $17–20 million
- Box office: $48.3 million

Queen & Slim is a 2019 American romantic road crime drama film directed by Melina Matsoukas (in her feature directorial debut) and with a screenplay by Lena Waithe from a story by James Frey and Waithe. The film tells the story of a young couple (Daniel Kaluuya and Jodie Turner-Smith) who go on the run after killing a police officer, in self-defense, in the heat of an argument during a traffic stop that had quickly escalated. Bokeem Woodbine, Chloë Sevigny, Flea, Sturgill Simpson and Indya Moore also star.

Queen & Slim had its world premiere at the AFI Fest on November 14, 2019, and was theatrically released in the United States on November 27, 2019, by Universal Pictures. It received positive reviews from critics, with praise for Kaluuya and Turner-Smith's lead performances, Matsoukas' direction and its overall theme and message.

== Plot ==
“Queen”, a criminal defense attorney, has an awkward dinner with her Tinder date “Slim“ in an Ohio diner. He drives her home, and they are pulled over by a white police officer who searches Slim and his trunk. When Slim asks if he could hurry as it is cold outside, the officer draws his gun on him. Queen gets out to confront the officer, reaching for her phone, and he shoots her in the leg. Slim tackles the officer and a scuffle ensues, resulting in Slim grabbing the officer's gun and shooting him dead. Taking the gun and throwing away their phones, Queen tells Slim they must go on the run, or else spend their lives in prison.

Out of gas, they flag down a passing driver, Edgar, who turns out to be a Kentucky sheriff. He receives an APB about the officer's death and realizes Queen and Slim are the suspects, but they take his truck at gunpoint, leaving him in the trunk of Slim's car. They pay a young boy to order them food, and he reveals that dashcam footage of their confrontation with the officer has gone viral. They accidentally strike the boy's father with the truck, but he is supportive of their actions and they drive him to a hospital. Slim has an unsettling encounter with a gas station clerk after letting him hold the gun.

They arrive in New Orleans at the house of Queen's estranged Uncle Earl, a pimp, and Slim proposes they escape to Cuba. After a police officer notices their truck, Earl gives them money and another car to reach Johnny Shepherd, a friend whose life he saved while serving overseas. Queen and Slim bond while dancing at a bar, where they are recognized by sympathetic locals, and stop to admire a horse by the road. Their car breaks down, forcing them to give all their money to a black mechanic, whose teenage son Junior expresses his admiration for them; Slim has Junior take their picture.

Slim calls his father, who cuts the call short; it is revealed that law enforcement were listening in, but his father refuses to cooperate. Queen takes Slim to visit the grave of her mother, who was accidentally killed by Earl during a disagreement; Queen successfully defended him in her first trial. Slim comforts Queen, and they have sex in the car. At a protest in support of the fugitives, Junior is urged to leave by a compassionate black officer, whom he impulsively shoots in the face, and who is, himself, killed.

Queen and Slim reach the home of Shepherd and his wife, who reveal that a $500,000 bounty has been placed on them, and Shepherd gives them directions to a man in Florida. A neighbor sees them arrive, and a SWAT team raids the house but fails to find them, hidden in a crawlspace under the Shepherds' bed. The next day, they sneak out of the house through a window and Queen dislocates her shoulder, which Slim resets, but her cry alerts a black officer stationed outside. He discovers them about to flee in the Shepherds' car, but lets them escape.

They reach the Florida address and sleep in the car, awakened in the morning by a black man with a shotgun. They follow him to his trailer where he makes a call, telling them a friend can help them escape by plane. He drives them to the tarmac and Queen and Slim walk toward a waiting plane, but a squad of police cars arrive. Joining hands, they declare their love for each other, but Queen is shot dead by an overeager officer. Ignoring police commands, Slim carries Queen's body toward the officers and is gunned down as well.

The people Queen and Slim encountered react to news reports of their deaths; the Florida man has collected the bounty. Their real names are revealed to be Angela Johnson and Ernest Hines, and hundreds attend their funeral, viewing them as martyrs as Junior's photo of them becomes a symbol across the country.

== Cast ==
- Daniel Kaluuya as Ernest "Slim" Hines
- Jodie Turner-Smith as Angela "Queen" Johnson
- Bokeem Woodbine as Uncle Earl
- Chloë Sevigny as Mrs. Shepherd
- Flea as Mr. Johnny Shepherd
- Sturgill Simpson as Police Officer Reed
- Indya Moore as Goddess
- Benito Martinez as Sheriff Edgar
- Jahi Di'Allo Winston as Junior
- Gralen Bryant Banks as auto mechanic/"Older Black Man"
- Dickson Obahor as Large Black Man
- Bryant Tardy as Chubby
- Thom Gossom Jr. as Slim's Father
- Melanie Halfkenny as Naomi
- Bertrand E. Boyd II as Florida Man

== Production ==
On July 19, 2018, it was announced that production company Makeready had won a bidding war to co-finance the dramatic thriller film Queen & Slim, scripted by Lena Waithe from an original idea by James Frey, which would star Daniel Kaluuya and be directed by Melina Matsoukas. In November 2018, Jodie Turner-Smith was cast to star opposite Kaluuya. In March 2019, Chloë Sevigny joined the cast of the film. Shiona Turini served as costume designer.

Principal photography began in January 2019. Production concluded on March 22, 2019.

== Music ==
The score album for Queen & Slim was composed by English musician Devonté Hynes. On choosing the composer, Matsoukas stated she wanted a "black composer that could live between classical, hip-hop, and pop that's current", further asking "Who would be our current Quincy Jones?". Matsoukas then turned to Solange Knowles for advice; Knowles suggested Hynes.

== Release ==
Queen & Slim had its world premiere at the AFI Fest on November 14, 2019. It was theatrically released in the United States on November 27, 2019, by Universal Pictures. It was released in the United Kingdom in January 2020.

== Reception ==
=== Box office ===
Queen & Slim grossed $43.8 million in the United States and Canada, and $4.5 million in other territories, for a worldwide total of $48.3 million.

In the United States and Canada, the film was released alongside Knives Out, and was projected to gross $12–16 million from 1,625 theaters over its five-day opening weekend. It made $1.7 million on its first day, Wednesday, and $2.4 million on Thursday, which was Thanksgiving Day. It went on to gross $11.9 million during its opening weekend (a five-day total of $16 million), finishing fourth at the box office. In its second weekend the film made $6.5 million (a drop of 45%), remaining in fourth.

=== Critical response ===
Review aggregator website Rotten Tomatoes reported an approval rating of 82% based on 233 reviews, with an average rating of 7.4/10. The site's critics consensus reads, "Stylish, provocative, and powerful, Queen & Slim tells a gripping fugitive story steeped in timely, thoughtful subtext." Metacritic, another review aggregator, assigned the film a weighted average score of 74 out of 100 based on 43 critics, indicating "generally favorable reviews". Audiences polled by CinemaScore gave the film an average grade of "A−" on an A+ to F scale, while those at PostTrak gave it an average 5 out of 5 stars, with 79% saying they would definitely recommend it.

Mark Kermode of The Guardian assigned the film four out of five stars writing: "in the end it's the love story that makes the film matter, conjured with enough electricity to allow the polemics of the head to be swept along by the passions of the heart." Johnny Oleksinski of New York Post praised Daniel Kaluuya and Jodie Turner-Smith's lead performances. Adam White of The Independent labelled it "simultaneously beautiful and troubling" and praised Melina Matsoukas' directing.

== Accolades ==
Award	Date of ceremony	Category	Recipients	Result	Ref.
African-American Film Critics Association	December 10, 2019	Impact Award	Melina Matsoukas, Lena Waithe and James Frey	Won	
African-American Film Critics Association	December 10, 2019	Top 10 Best Films	Melina Matsoukas, Lena Waithe and James Frey	Won	
Alliance of Women Film Journalists Awards	January 10, 2020	Best Woman's Breakthrough Performance	Jodie Turner-Smith	Nominated	
ASCAP London Awards	October 21, 2020	Top Music Film Awards	Devonté Hynes	Won	
Austin Film Critics Association Awards	January 6, 2020	Best First Film	Melina Matsoukas	Nominated	
BET Awards	June 28, 2020	Best Movie	Queen & Slim	Won	
Black Film Critics Circle Awards	December 19, 2019	Best Picture	Melina Matsoukas, Lena Waithe and James Frey	Nominated	
Black Film Critics Circle Awards	December 19, 2019	Best Original Screenplay	Lena Waithe	Won	
Black Reel Awards	February 6, 2020	Outstanding Film	Melina Matsoukas, Lena Waithe and James Frey	Nominated	
Black Reel Awards	February 6, 2020	Outstanding Director	Melina Matsoukas	Nominated	
Black Reel Awards	February 6, 2020	Outstanding Emerging Director	Melina Matsoukas	Won	
Black Reel Awards	February 6, 2020	Outstanding Actress	Jodie Turner-Smith	Nominated	
Black Reel Awards	February 6, 2020	Outstanding Breakthrough Performance, Female	Jodie Turner-Smith	Nominated	
Black Reel Awards	February 6, 2020	Outstanding Actor	Daniel Kaluuya	Nominated	
Black Reel Awards	February 6, 2020	Outstanding Screenplay, Adapted or Original	Lena Waithe	Nominated	
Black Reel Awards	February 6, 2020	Outstanding First Screenplay	Lena Waithe	Won	
Black Reel Awards	February 6, 2020	Outstanding Original Score	Dev Hynes	Nominated	
Black Reel Awards	February 6, 2020	Outstanding Cinematography	Tad Radcliffe	Won	
Black Reel Awards	February 6, 2020	Outstanding Costume Design	Shiona Turini	Nominated	
Black Reel Awards	February 6, 2020	Outstanding Production Design	Karen Murphy	Nominated	
Black Reel Awards	February 6, 2020	Outstanding Original Song	"Collide" (by Tiana Major9 and EarthGang)	Won	
Black Reel Awards	February 6, 2020	Outstanding Original Song	"Guarding the Gates" (by Lauryn Hill)	Nominated	
Costume Designers Guild Awards	January 28, 2020	Excellence in Contemporary Film	Shiona Turini	Nominated	
Directors Guild of America Awards	January 25, 2020	Outstanding Directing – First-Time Feature Film	Melina Matsoukas	Nominated	
Florida Film Critics Circle Awards	December 23, 2019	Best First Film	Melina Matsoukas	Won	
Guild of Music Supervisors Awards	February 6, 2020	Best Music Supervision for Films Budgeted Under $25 Million	Kier Lehman	Won	
Hawaii Film Critics Society Awards	January 14, 2020	Best First Film	Melina Matsoukas	Nominated	
Hawaii Film Critics Society Awards	January 14, 2020	Best New Filmmaker	Melina Matsoukas	Nominated	
Hollywood Music in Media Awards	November 20, 2019	Outstanding Music Supervision - Film	Kier Lehman	Nominated	
Hollywood Music in Media Awards	November 20, 2019	Best Soundtrack Album	Queen & Slim Soundtrack	Nominated	
Hollywood Critics Association Awards	January 9, 2020	Best First Feature	Melina Matsoukas	Nominated	
Motion Picture Sound Editors Awards	January 19, 2020	Outstanding Achievement in Sound Editing – Music Underscore	Joseph S. DeBeasi	Nominated	
NAACP Image Awards	February 22, 2020	Outstanding Motion Picture	Queen & Slim	Nominated	
NAACP Image Awards	February 22, 2020	Outstanding Ensemble Cast in a Motion Picture	Queen & Slim	Nominated	
NAACP Image Awards	February 22, 2020	Outstanding Independent Motion Picture	Queen & Slim	Nominated	
NAACP Image Awards	February 22, 2020	Outstanding Actor in a Motion Picture	Daniel Kaluuya	Nominated	
NAACP Image Awards	February 22, 2020	Outstanding Actress in a Motion Picture	Jodie Turner-Smith	Nominated	
NAACP Image Awards	February 22, 2020	Outstanding Breakthrough Role in a Motion Picture	Jodie Turner-Smith	Nominated	
NAACP Image Awards	February 22, 2020	Outstanding Soundtrack/Compilation Album	Queen & Slim Soundtrack	Nominated	
National Board of Review	December 3, 2019	Best Directorial Debut	Melina Matsoukas	Won	
Online Association of Female Film Critics	December 23, 2019	Breakthrough Filmmaker	Melina Matsoukas	Nominated	
Online Film Critics Society Awards	January 6, 2020	Best Debut Feature	Melina Matsoukas	Nominated	
St. Louis Film Critics Association Awards	December 15, 2019	Best Original Screenplay	Lena Waithe	Nominated	
Toronto Film Critics Association Awards	December 8, 2019	Best First Feature	Melina Matsoukas	Nominated	
Women Film Critics Circle Awards	December 9, 2019	Best Woman Storyteller	Lena Waithe	Nominated	
Women Film Critics Circle Awards	December 9, 2019	Best Equality of the Sexes	Queen & Slim	Nominated	
Women Film Critics Circle Awards	December 9, 2019	Best Screen Couple	Daniel Kaluuya and Jodie Turner-Smith	Nominated	
Women Film Critics Circle Awards	December 9, 2019	Josephine Baker Award	Queen & Slim	Runner-up	

== See also ==
- List of black films of the 2010s
