= The Kitchen (2023 film) =

British film by Kibwe Tavares and Daniel Kaluuya

- Release poster
- Directed by: Kibwe Tavares; Daniel Kaluuya
- Written by: Daniel Kaluuya; Joe Murtagh
- Produced by: Daniel Emmerson; Daniel Kaluuya
- Starring: Kane Robinson; Jedaiah Bannerman; Hope Ikpoku Jr; Teija Kabs; Demmy Ladipo; Ian Wright
- Cinematography: Wyatt Garfield
- Edited by: Christian Sandino-Taylor; Maya Maffioli
- Music by: Labrinth; Alex Baranowski
- Production companies: Film4; DMC Film; 59% Productions
- Distributed by: Netflix
- Release dates: October 15, 2023 (BFI); January 12, 2024 (United Kingdom)
- Running time: 107 minutes
- Country: United Kingdom
- Language: English

The Kitchen is a 2023 British dystopian drama film directed by Kibwe Tavares and Daniel Kaluuya from a screenplay from Kaluuya and Joe Murtagh. The film stars Kane Robinson, Jedaiah Bannerman, Hope Ikpoku Jr, Teija Kabs, Demmy Ladipo, Cristale and BackRoad Gee.

The Kitchen had its world premiere at the 67th BFI London Film Festival on October 15, 2023, and was released in select cinemas in the United Kingdom on 12 January 2024, before its streaming debut by Netflix on 19 January 2024.

== Plot ==
Izi lives in a dystopian future London where social housing has been eliminated. Only one community known as "The Kitchen" remains, but it’s at risk of being erased by the rich. He works at Life After Life, a futuristic funeral service where families who can’t afford a burial can turn their loved ones into trees, which they can visit until it’s time to plant them somewhere.

Izi befriends Benji, a 12-year-old boy who just lost his mother. Despite Izi being quite discreet, Benji notices him enter the chapel and asks Izi if he knew his mother. Izi tells Benji that he met his mother years ago, but doesn’t go into more details. Izi initially rejects Benji until he learns he’s staying with Staples (Hope Ikpoku Jr), the leader of a group of vigilante activists.

Over time they get closer. Izi gets Benji to help him with work at the funeral company. But Izi struggles to open up to Benji and let him into his life. After leaving Benji with no explanation, to live in a luxurious apartment outside "The Kitchen" that he had worked hard to get, Izi returns and he and Benji are forced to hide in the former’s apartment in "The Kitchen" as the police arrive to raid the buildings.

Benji directly asks Izi if he’s his father, with Izi giving a soft and subtle nod before asking him if he wants him to be his dad, with Benji simply saying “let’s just see how it goes”. Izi puts his arm around Benji and keeps him from turning to the door as the police aggressively bang against it. The police break into Izi’s apartment as the screen cuts to black, leaving Izi and Benji’s fates unknown.

== Cast ==
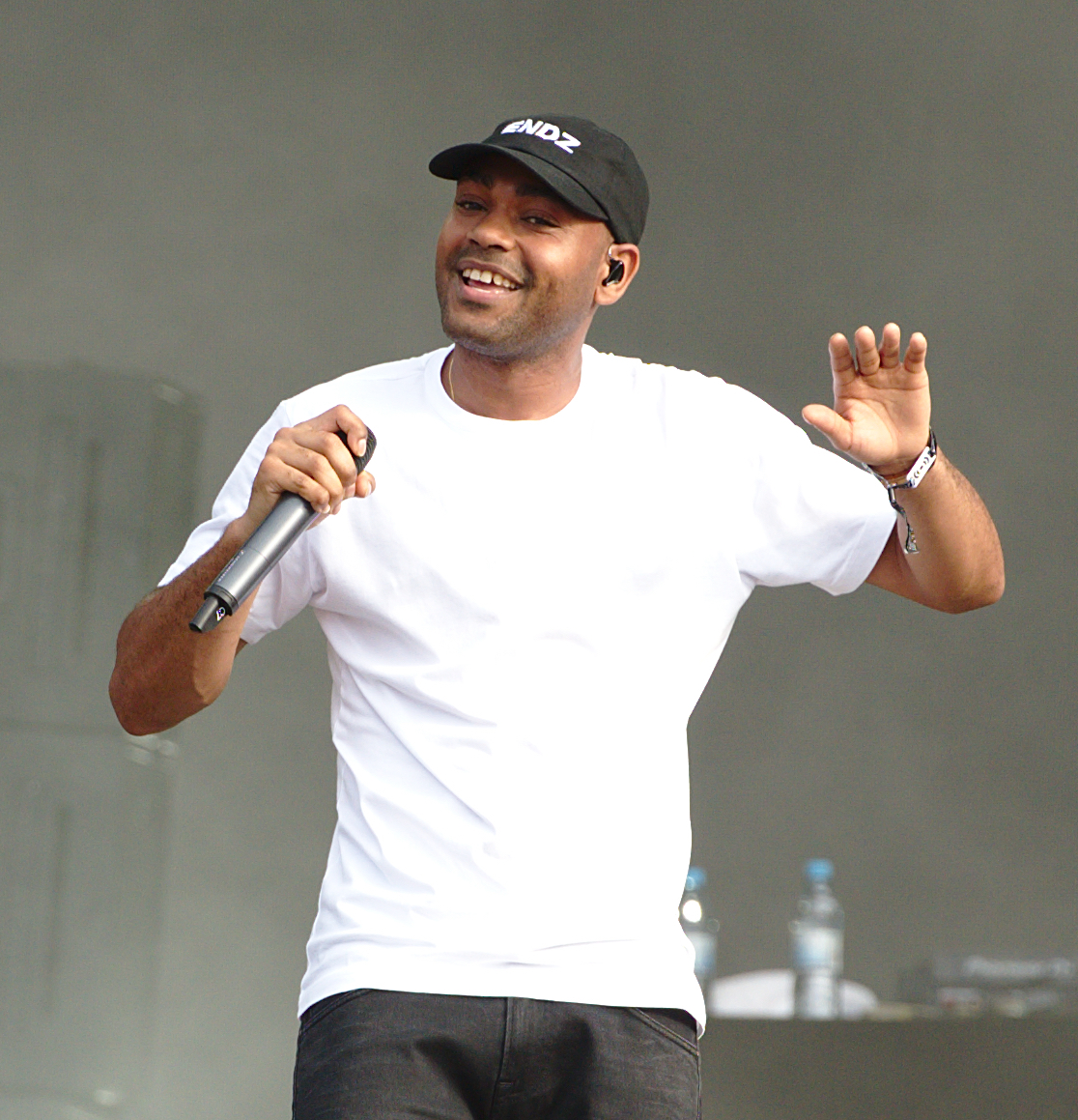
Kane Robinson plays Izi.

- Kane Robinson as Izi
- Jedaiah Bannerman as Benji
- Hope Ikpoku Jr as Staples
- Teija Kabs as Ruby
- Demmy Ladipo as Jase
- Cristale as Lianne
- BackRoad Gee as Kamale
- Rasaq Kukoyi as Arinze
- Reuben 'Trizzy' Nyamah as Dirty
- Henry Lawfull as Cronik
- Alan Asaad as Oozie
- Ian Wright as Lord Kitchener

== Production ==
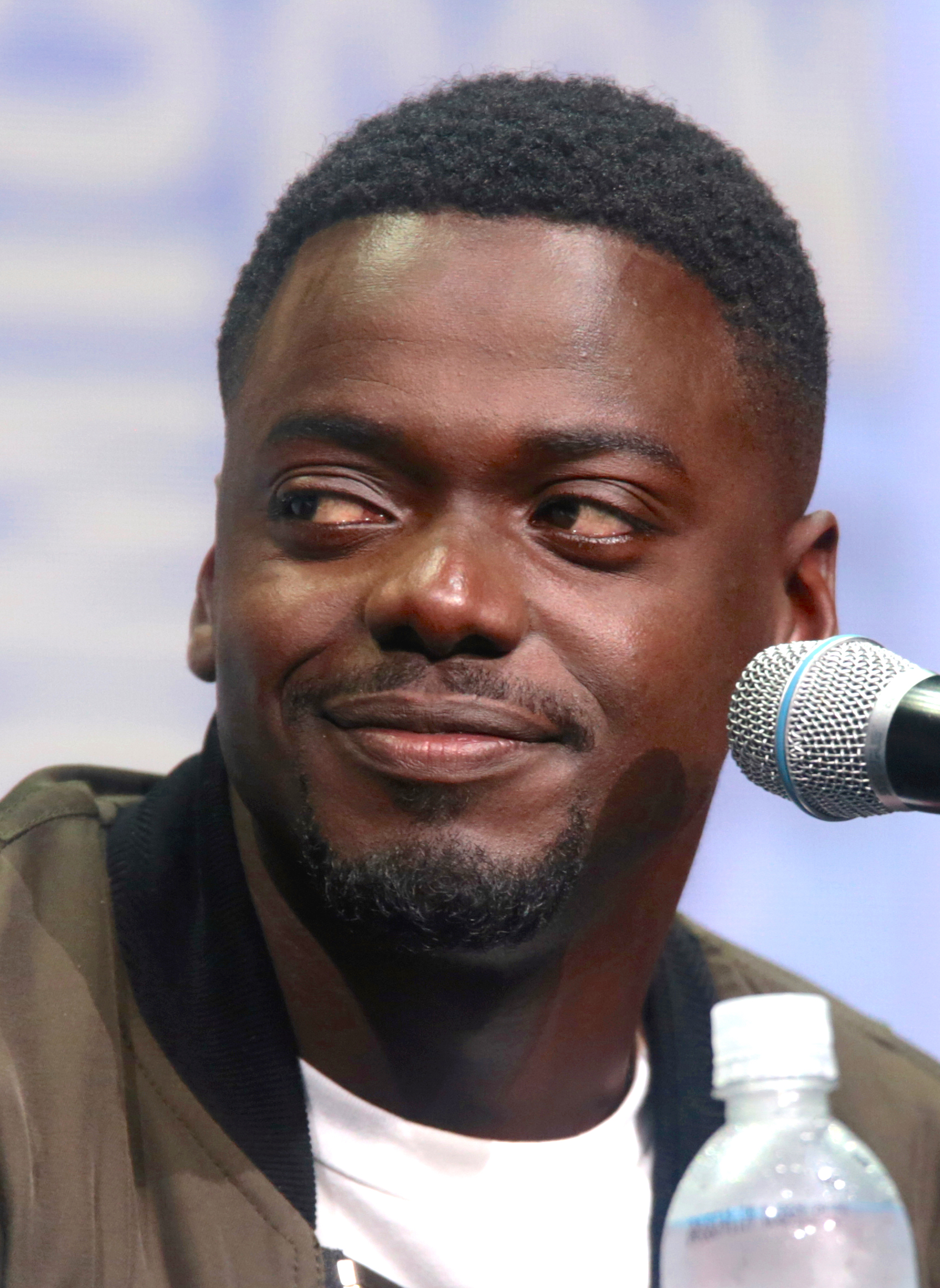
Co-writer, co-director, and producer Daniel Kaluuya

The Kitchen is the feature-length directorial debut of both Kibwe Tavares and Daniel Kaluuya. Tavares, Kaluuya and producer Daniel Emmerson began developing the film in 2014, after a conversation in a barbershop. In 2016, the film was selected for Sundance's Screenwriting and Directing Lab.

Production on the film took place from March to June 2022. The film was shot entirely on location. The Kitchen market was the old London Electricity Board Building on Cambridge Heath Road in London. The Kitchen neighborhood was the Damiers complex in La Défense, Paris.

== Release ==
The Kitchen premiered as the closing film of the 67th BFI London Film Festival on October 15, 2023. It was released in select cinemas in the United Kingdom on 12 January 2024 before its streaming debut by Netflix on 19 January 2024.

== Reception ==
On the review aggregator website Rotten Tomatoes, 87% of 54 critics' reviews are positive, with an average rating of 6.6/10. The website's consensus reads: "Smart sci-fi that's solidly grounded in social commentary, The Kitchen suggests a bright future for the directing duo of Daniel Kaluuya and Kibwe Tavares." Metacritic, which uses a weighted average, assigned the film a score of 67 out of 100, based on 22 critics, indicating "generally favorable" reviews.

Wendy Ide of The Guardian gave the movie three stars, noting: "The rich world-building is the picture’s main asset: the film looks fantastic, with its screaming neons and precipitous concrete cliff faces. The space in which the story unfolds is rather more distinctive than the story itself, which covers familiar territory and loses some energy as the film progresses."

Debiparna Chakraborty of Far Out gave the movie four stars, saying: "The film is an unapologetic exploration of societal decay, where oppression echoes the familiar tune of historical colonisers. From land theft to the control of basic resources and extreme police surveillance, The Kitchen arrives with a searing reminder that the tragic future we once read in science-fiction books is already here for the exploited and oppressed."
