= Fifteen Million Merits =

2nd episode of the 1st series of Black Mirror

- Black Mirror episode
- Bing (Daniel Kaluuya) awakens in his screen-covered cell every morning. A key inspiration for the episode was Konnie Huq's remark that her technology-obsessed husband, Charlie Brooker, would be content in a room which was covered in iPad screens.
- Episode no.: Series 1 Episode 2
- Directed by: Euros Lyn
- Written by: Charlie Brooker; Kanak Huq
- Cinematography by: Damian Bromley
- Editing by: Jamie Pearson
- Original air date: 11 December 2011
- Running time: 62 minutes

Guest appearances
- Daniel Kaluuya as Bingham "Bing" Madsen; Jessica Brown Findlay as Abi Khan; Rupert Everett as Judge Hope; Julia Davis as Judge Charity; Ashley Thomas as Judge Wraith; Paul Popplewell as Dustin; Isabella Laughland as Swift; Hannah John-Kamen as Selma Telse; Kerrie Hayes as Glee

Episode chronology
| ← Previous "The National Anthem" | Next → "The Entire History of You" |

"Fifteen Million Merits" is the second episode of the first series of the British science fiction anthology series Black Mirror. It was written by the series creator and showrunner Charlie Brooker and his wife Konnie Huq (Note: Konnie Huq was credited in the episode as "Kanak Huq".) and directed by Euros Lyn. It first aired on Channel 4 on 11 December 2011; it was deliberately aired after The X Factor's series 8 finale.

Set in an enclosed world where most of society must cycle on exercise bikes in order to generate electricity and then earn currency called "merits", the episode tells the story of Bing (Daniel Kaluuya), who meets Abi (Jessica Brown Findlay) and convinces her to participate in a talent show so she can become famous. The episode was inspired by Huq's idea that her technology-obsessed husband Brooker would be happy in a room covered by screens; it additionally drew motivation from the narrative of talent shows leading to fame. "Fifteen Million Merits" incorporates elements of dystopian fiction, science fiction and drama, and offers commentary on capitalism.

The episode received a positive critical reception. The relationship of Abi and Bing drew comparison to that of Julia and Winston in Nineteen Eighty-Four, whilst Abi's objectification was compared to that of female media figures. The episode's ambiguous ending led to discussion about the commodification of dissent. The visual style and music of the episode were praised, as was the romance between Abi and Bing. The acting received a mixed reception, as did the world-building, but the depressing humour and bleak tone of the episode garnered positive reviews. "Fifteen Million Merits" was nominated for a British Academy Television Craft Award but did not win; regarding critics' lists of Black Mirror episodes by quality, it generally places middling or poorly.

== Plot ==
Bing Madsen (Daniel Kaluuya) lives in a room surrounded by screens that wake him up, serve as a video game console and feature regular adverts. He rides on a stationary bike to generate electricity in exchange for "merits," which he needs to pay for his daily cost of living. He sits next to Dustin (Paul Popplewell), an obnoxious man who degrades the overweight cleaners as they pass and watches pornography as he cycles.

Overhearing Abi Khan (Jessica Brown Findlay) singing in the toilets, Bing persuades her to enter Hot Shot, a virtual talent show whose winners can live a life of luxury. He offers to buy her entry ticket, having inherited millions of merits from his deceased brother. The ticket costs more merits than he thought, 15 million, almost his entire savings, but he buys it. Bing goes with Abi to the audition and she gives him an origami penguin. Abi is made to drink a carton of "Cuppliance" before performing "Anyone Who Knows What Love Is (Will Understand)" by Irma Thomas for the judges, Wraith, Hope and Charity (Ashley Thomas, Rupert Everett and Julia Davis, respectively). The judges praise her performance, but maintain that being an "above average" singer is not enough, so Wraith offers a place for Abi on his pornography channel WraithBabes. Despite Bing's protests from backstage, Abi, succumbing to pressure from the audience and judges (and the implied psychoactive influence of the Cuppliance), accepts.

While in his room, Bing sees an advertisement for WraithBabes, featuring Abi. He does not have enough merits to skip it, and a high-pitched noise sounds when he looks away from the screens, so he must watch. Increasingly agitated, he smashes a screen out of frustration and then hides a shard of glass under his bed. Bing becomes obsessed with buying another Hot Shot ticket, cycling obsessively and living frugally. He buys a ticket and hides the shard of glass in his trousers. Onstage, he starts performing a dance number, then pulls out the shard and threatens to slice his own neck. Wraith goads him to do it, but the other judges encourage him to speak. Bing passionately and angrily rants about the heartless, artificial system they live under. Hope declares the speech the most heartfelt in Hot Shot history and offers Bing his own regular show on one of his channels.

Bing is shown recording his show, where he rants while holding the shard to his neck. Despite criticising the system on his show, he now lives in a luxury apartment, and the episode ends with him looking out from his room at a view that resembles a vast green forest.

== Production ==
The executive producers Charlie Brooker and Annabel Jones began work on Black Mirror in 2010, having previously worked together on other television programmes. The programme was commissioned for three hour-long episodes by Channel 4, taking its budget from the comedy department. Brooker's production company Zeppotron produced the show for Endemol. "Fifteen Million Merits" was the first Black Mirror episode to be written, though it aired second, following "The National Anthem".

=== Conception and writing ===
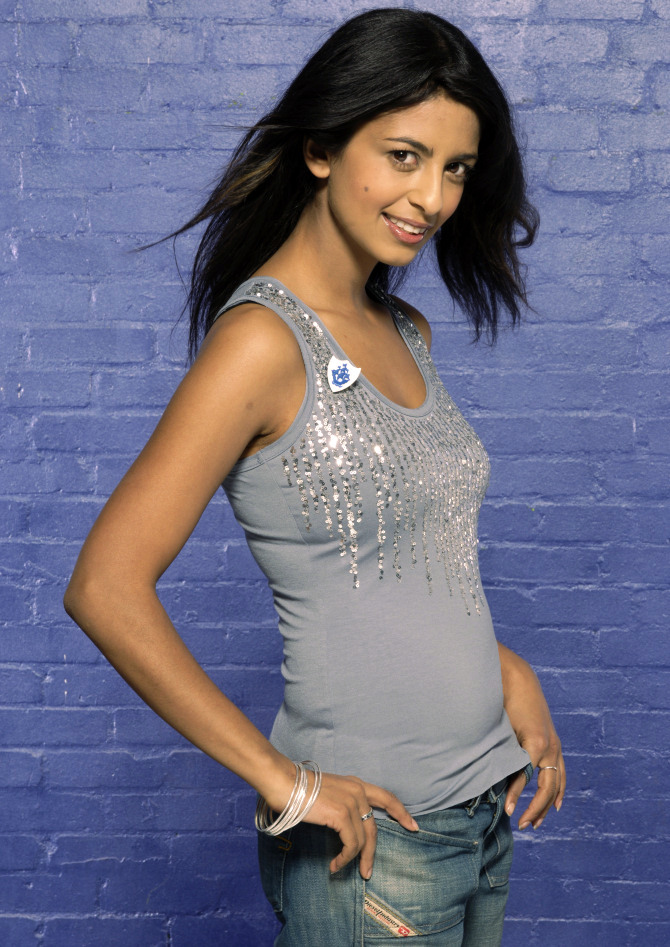
British television presenter Konnie Huq co-wrote "Fifteen Million Merits" along with her husband, series creator Charlie Brooker.

"Fifteen Million Merits" was written by Brooker and his wife Konnie Huq; an inspiration for the episode was Huq's remark that Brooker would "basically be happy in a room where every wall" was an iPad screen. Huq had conceived of a future where the walls of every house would be a touch-screen television, whilst Brooker had been inspired by avatars and Miis on the Xbox 360 and Wii. Huq had also had an idea that gyms should be powered by the energy produced by its exercise equipment.

Additionally, Brooker said that the episode is based on a narrative promoted by talent shows where becoming an "overnight star" is "one of the main means of salvation that's held up" for people who "do a job they hate for little reward". At the time, Huq was presenting The Xtra Factor, a reality series companion show. She had previously presented the children's television show Blue Peter and noted that many children wanted to be famous without knowing what they would be famous for. The episode was also influenced by The Year of the Sex Olympics, a 1968 dystopian television play that comments on reality television.

In an article promoting Black Mirror shortly before its release, Brooker mentioned the "1984" ad produced by Apple, Inc. for the Apple Macintosh computer. He said that the advert "implied the Mac might save mankind from a nightmarish Orwellian future", but that such a world would instead "probably" look "a bit like" the one in "Fifteen Million Merits". He and Huq nicknamed the episode the "Screenwipe Story" because of the similarities between Bing's monologues and Brooker's televised rants on Charlie Brooker's Screenwipe.

The ending went through various drafts. One idea featured Bing and Abi living together, both unhappy with their lives; another idea had Bing deliver his stream and anxiously pore over the ratings for it. One ending revealed that the exercise bikes were not connected to anything, contrary to the implication that they are generating electricity; Jones commented that the viewer may think this anyway.

=== Filming and post-production ===
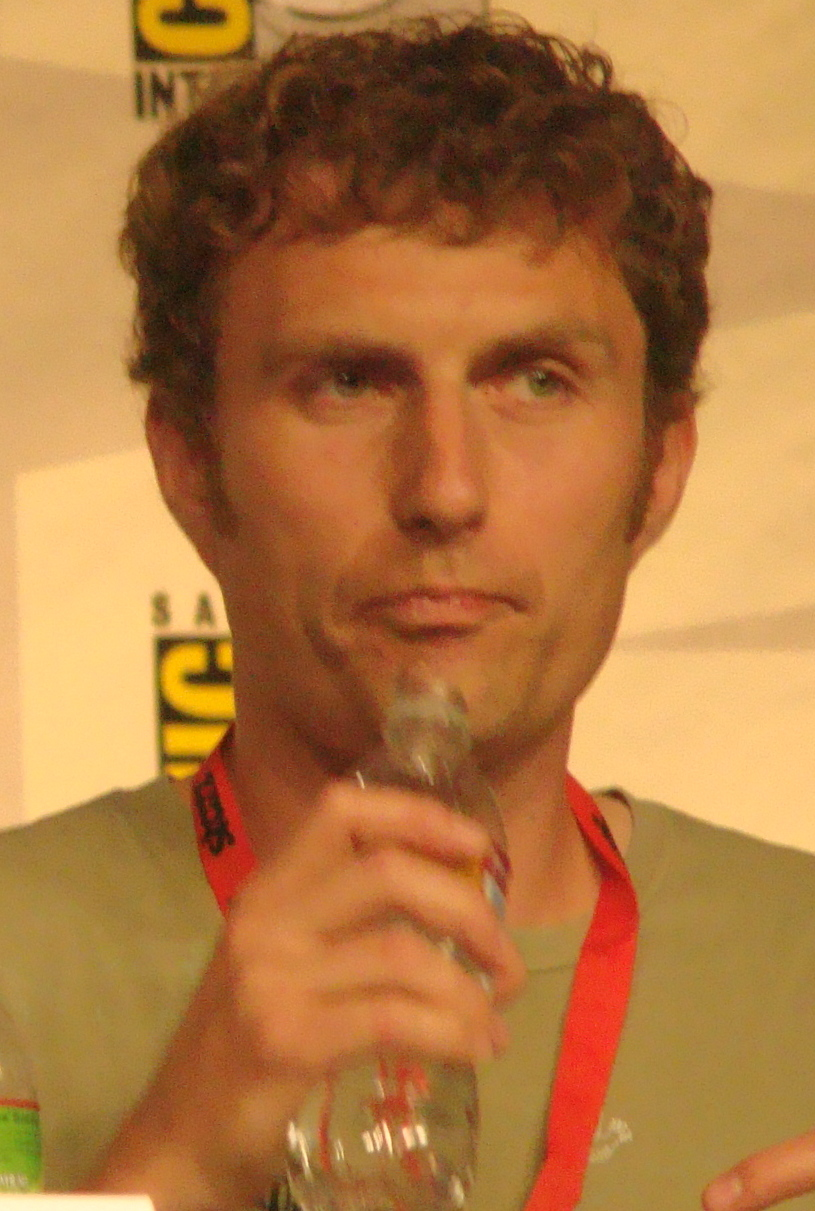
Euros Lyn directed the episode

Euros Lyn directed the episode; Brooker had written reviews of Lyn's work on the science fiction programme Doctor Who and Lyn was familiar with his articles in The Guardian and his show Nathan Barley. Daniel Kaluuya was cast as Bing Madsen, based on an audition in which he performed Bing's rant on Hot Shot. Kaluuya would later be cast by Jordan Peele in the 2017 horror film Get Out because of the strength of this scene. Jessica Brown Findlay played Abi, having recently finished working on historical drama Downton Abbey. Rupert Everett played Judge Hope, Julia Davis played Judge Charity and Ashley Thomas, known by the stage name "Bashy", played Judge Wraith.

Additionally, characters riding the exercises bikes include Dustin, an unpleasant cyclist played by Paul Popplewell and Swift, a woman with a crush on Bing played by Isabella Laughland. Hannah John-Kamen was cast as the Hot Shot winner Selma, whilst Kerrie Hayes played Glee, a mediocre singer wanting to appear on Hot Shot.

Filming took place in Buckingham, on a disused university campus. Due to the small budget, every scene was filmed on one set, which was redressed for each location. The sets feature working screens, as using visual effects would have required a larger budget and more time. For example, when Kaluuya swiped his hand in front of a screen attached to his bike machine, a crew member would press a button to trigger the screen's response. Digital avatars called "doppels" represented each character on the screens, including in a large Hot Shot audience. An illustrator and a team of animators worked on the doppels, with every cast member being assigned an avatar, and hundreds more avatars appearing in the Hot Shot audience. Many audience reactions were shot so that they could be inserted as appropriate responses to the story and dialogue. The "cycling chamber" shown is one of thousands in the building in which the story takes place; a low budget meant this building could only be shown sparingly.

Bing's screen displays different programmes. Whilst the gameshow Botherguts was fictional and had to be filmed, Endemol allowed their gameshows Don't Scare the Hare and The Whole 19 Yards to be displayed on the screens. Additionally, adverts for the fictional pornography channel WraithBabes needed to be filmed; two real pornographic actresses were hired, with one of the actresses bringing her boyfriend to participate in the shoot. For the WraithBabes video featuring Abi, the team shot some graphic elements that were ultimately not used. The final version has the actor put his thumb in Abi's mouth, giving a sense of "weird violation" rather than titillation.

To inform Kaluuya's portrayal of Bing, Lyn and Kaluuya discussed Bing's backstory in great depth, considering Bing's relationship with his deceased brother. In a key scene, Bing smashes a screen in his cell after seeing Abi in a porn advert. During filming of the scene, Kaluuya accidentally cut his foot, a moment that was included in the final cut. The episode reaches its climax with Bing's appearance on Hot Shot, where he dances before delivering a rant. Kaluuya worked with a choreographer for the dance, whilst the rant was written by Brooker "in a real rush" to imitate Bing's feelings as he speaks. It contains lines that do not make complete sense, such as "You're sitting there slowly knitting things worse". Bing's Hot Shot performance was filmed in two takes, with three cameras on Kaluuya.

Judge Hope was inspired by the talent competition judge Simon Cowell, as well as BBC Radio 1 DJs from the 1970s. Davis and Everett both had the idea of affecting Australian accents, but only Everett was allowed to do so. To distance Judge Hope from the singer George Michael, Everett removed his glasses during his first scene.

=== Music ===
The episode features an original soundtrack by Stephen McKeon, who agreed with Lyn that the score should use live musicians and sound "natural" as a contrast to the artificiality of the setting. The music for Bing's character is Western in genre, chosen to match his cell's personalised theme and to evoke the symbolism of a hero in Western film, which Bing unsuccessfully tries to embody by "saving" Abi.

The music for pornography channel WraithBabes features voices by Tara Lee, McKeon's daughter, who was 16 years old at the time. The scene in which Bing works hard to achieve enough merits to enter Hot Shot is five minutes long; the music had to build throughout, and McKeon used a sample of an exercise bike in his composition. The song "Anyone Who Knows What Love Is (Will Understand)" by Irma Thomas was chosen by Brooker to stand out from the dystopic setting; he wanted a catchy song with a 1960s style. It recurs in later Black Mirror episodes.

== Broadcast ==
The episode first aired on 11 December 2011, a week after "The National Anthem", the programme's debut episode. Coincidentally, "Fifteen Million Merits" was initially scheduled to air at the same time as the final of the eighth series of ITV's The X Factor. Brooker contacted Channel 4, who moved the programme to a later timeslot. Trailers for the episode noted that it would air after The X Factor final, and one trailer ran on ITV during the final itself. Brooker commented that Hot Shot was not meant to "directly be" The X Factor, as talent shows have different roles in the fictional setting of the episode.

== Museum exhibit ==
From June to September 2017, scenes from "Fifteen Million Merits" were featured at a Barbican Centre exhibit entitled "Into the Unknown: A Journey Through Science Fiction". The entrance contained an installation 6 feet (1.8 m) high containing extracts from the episode across multiple screens.

== Analysis ==
The episode falls under the genres of dystopian fiction, science fiction and drama, with elements of romance. David Sims of The A.V. Club described it as "far-fetched satire", whilst Brooker called it "an incredibly reductive piss-taking version of capitalism". Alexandra Howard of The 405 identified advertising and capitalism as "villain[s]" in this episode, while Adam David of CNN Philippines found the world to be "techno-fascist". The janitors, the exercise bikers and the television hosts can be seen as different social classes. David thought that the world represented neoliberalism, a political system in which "freedom is merely another cage you have to pay your way to get imprisoned in". The episode addresses disadvantages to contemporary technology as well as more emotional themes: Jacob Hall of /Film found that it takes the idea of microtransactions in video games to "hellish extremes" and Ryan Lambie of Den of Geek wrote that the episode addresses the "fragility of relationships". The episode has a penguin motif, arising when Abi gives Bing an origami penguin, and concluding when Bing's ornamental penguin is seen in the ending.

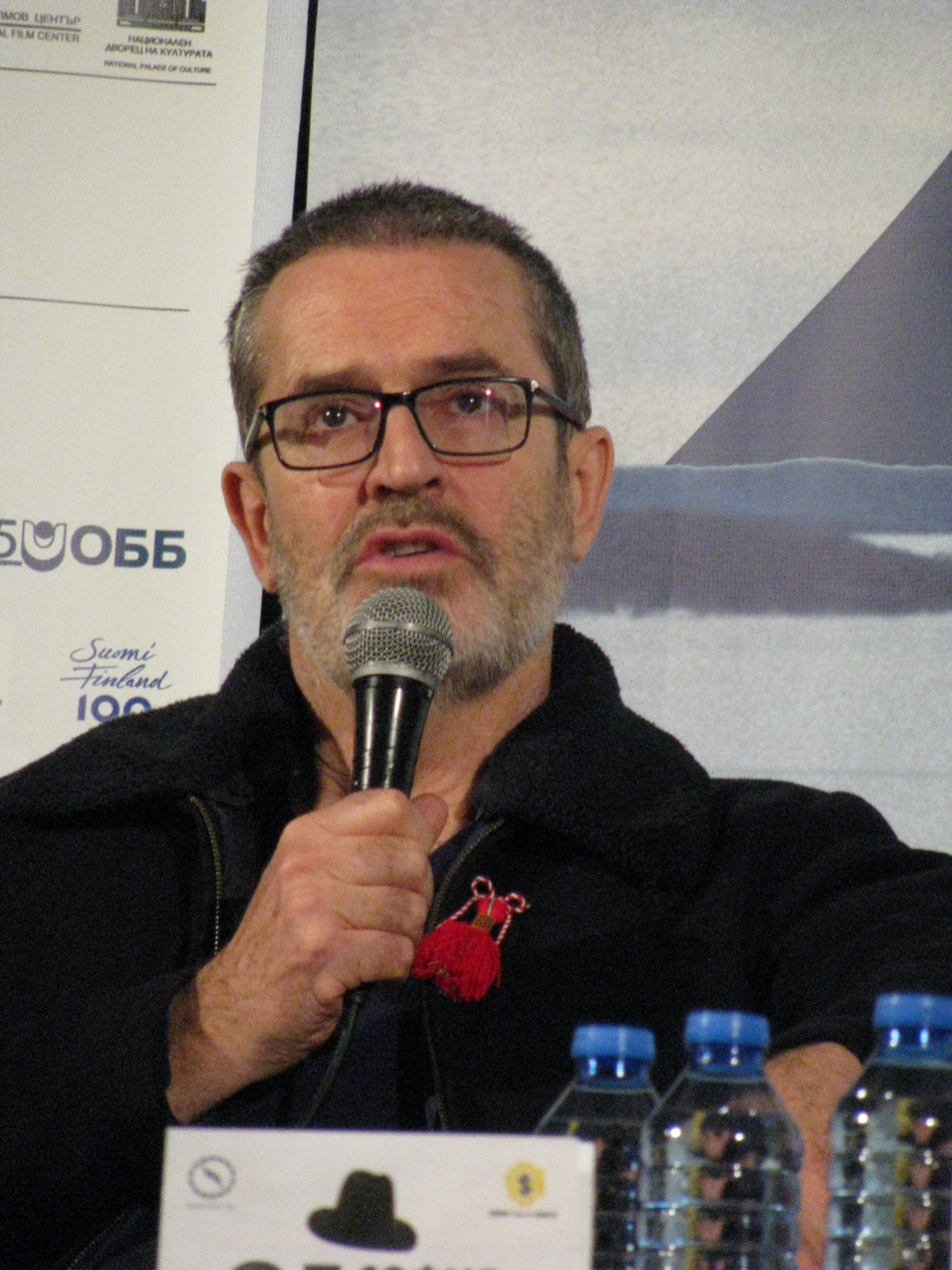
Rupert Everett's (left) character was widely compared to English television personality Simon Cowell (right).

The episode includes several fictional television shows such as the talent show Hot Shot and Botherguts, in which overweight people are degraded for entertainment. Sam Richards of The Telegraph noted that Hot Shot is "a caustic satire on TV talent shows"; it was widely considered to be based on the singing competition The X Factor, with Judge Hope in the role of Simon Cowell. Reviewers have also drawn comparisons to the singing competition American Idol. David Lewis of Cultbox compared Botherguts to Brooker's previous work TVGoHome.

"Fifteen Million Merits" was compared to various works of dystopian fiction. Lambie made comparisons to the 20th century dystopian novels Nineteen Eighty-Four, Brave New World and We, due to the plot revolving around a "doomed relationship". However, Bing and Abi are opposite to Winston and Julia of Nineteen Eighty-Four, who have their love suppressed by torture, as Bing "unwittingly sells Abi into a life of exploitation". Emily Yoshida of Grantland found the story to have parallels to 2006 film Idiocracy, set in a commercialised dystopia. Ian Berriman of GamesRadar+ compared the episode to the works of the American author Ray Bradbury and to the French Marxist Guy Debord's concept of the "spectacle". The first shot of the episode—in which a man is woken up in a dark room—is similar to that of the previous episode, "The National Anthem".

Bing is a tragic hero, according to Sam Wollaston of The Guardian. Richards believed that Bing can be seen as a satire of Brooker himself, as both can be described as a "bilious TV critic turned TV presenter". His character speaks very little for most of the episode before his stream of consciousness-style rant at the judges. Berriman suggests that the character's name could derive from the search engine Bing.

Howard described Abi as a woman who is "reduced to an object of gratification". She said that Abi's storyline is relevant to contemporary reality stars and Instagram models, arguing that "stardom, for women, equates to sexual objectification". She gave the example of the American media personality Kim Kardashian. Tim Surette of TV.com wrote that the episode provides a "look forward into our celebrity-obsessed culture".

The technology and setting of the episode were compared to contemporary technology and games. Sims used the metaphor that Bing is "stuck inside a cellphone", and that his life is a game of Candy Crush. Brendan Connelly of Bleeding Cool called Bing's cell a "little tomb made out of Kinect-equipped iPads". Sims noted that the doppels each person has resemble Mii avatars.

The ending was widely discussed by reviewers. The forest seen from Bing's window at the end of the episode can be interpreted as real or a computer-generated landscape. Connelly questioned whether Bing has "sold out" or "been deceived" into thinking his television show is having an effect. Berriman wrote that the "system can tolerate dissent, as long as it can be packaged and commodified". Yoshida concurred that "even our supposedly clear-eyed dissent to [mainstream media] can be packaged and sold".

== Reception ==
"Fifteen Million Merits" premiered on Channel 4 on 11 December 2011 at 9:30 p.m., where, according to 7-day figures from the Broadcasters' Audience Research Board, the episode was watched by 1.52 million viewers.

In 2012, Joel Collins and Daniel May were nominated for their work on the episode in the category Best Production Design at the British Academy Television Craft Awards, but did not win the award.

=== Critical reception ===
The episode garnered positive reviews. On the review aggregator website Rotten Tomatoes, it holds an approval rating of 100% based on 14 reviews, with an average rating of 9.50/10. The website's critics consensus reads: "Combining the worst aspects of reality shows, talent competitions, and a hunger for fame, 'Fifteen Million Merits' effectively shows how anything – even our humanity – could be readily exploited." It received ratings of five out of five stars in GamesRadar, four out of five stars in The Telegraph, three out of five stars in Cultbox and an A rating in The A.V. Club. As "Fifteen Million Merits" was the second episode of Black Mirror, many reviewers made qualitative comparisons to the first episode "The National Anthem". Sims found that it is a "grander work in every way", while Wollaston called it "much better", "more artful" and "moving", but Connelly found it disappointing in comparison to the first episode. It was Yoshida's favourite episode of the first two series. Surette wrote that the episode was "one of the most beautiful and haunting hours of science-fiction television you'll [ever] see".

The episode was seen by Connelly and Richards to overuse tropes, with Connelly calling it a "fairly prosaic story situated in an all too familiar future world". Berriman found the world-building lacking. In contrast, Surette believed it to portray "a fully realized future that might not be too far off". The episode received praise from Sims, who said it was "a dazzling piece of science fiction that builds its world out slowly but perfectly". Lewis said that its moral "is more sledgehammer than subtle", but Sims found the ending "devastating and smart". Connelly wrote that "the show really punched out through the screen" in the final scene.

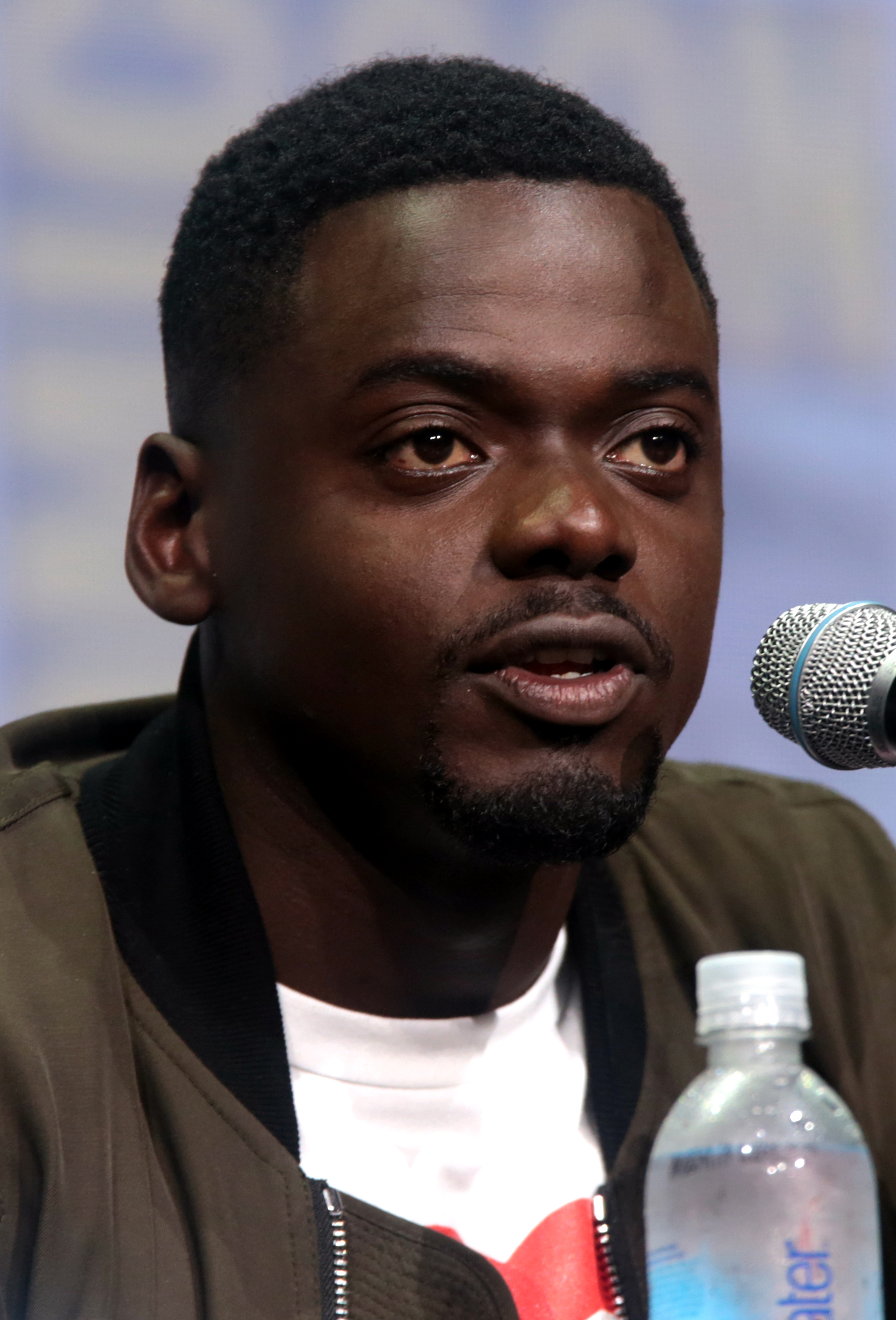
Daniel Kaluuya played Bing. His acting was praised by David Lewis of Cultbox, though David Sims of The A.V. Club found his character to be "perhaps too inscrutable".

Surette and Wollaston praised the work as "thought-provoking", whilst Yoshida found concepts in the episode to be "bleakly funny". It was described by Lewis as "profoundly depressing", "highly watchable" and "utterly wretched". Richards found it to have "style, savvy and lashings of acerbic humour". Meanwhile, Surette lauded it as "gripping" and Wollaston described it as "original" and "thoughtful". Sims praised the pacing as "slow" and "repetitive" but "utterly compelling". He gave as an example Bing's name being withheld during the first 20 minutes of the episode.

Wollaston remarked that "all the performances are good", though Sims found that Bing is "perhaps too inscrutable". Lewis praised Kaluuya's acting in Bing's performance on Hot Shot. Richards enjoyed the "deliciously evil" judges, but Lambie called Judge Hope "a little too shrill" and Wollaston believed that Julia Davis—who played Judge Charity—should have had a larger role.

Reception to Abi's storyline was mostly positive and the relationship between Abi and Bing was well-received. Though Connelly considered it dubious that Abi would "choose a life of televised sex abuse over a life of menial labour", Sims found it realistic, as Abi seems "blindsided" just as the audience is. Howard found that Abi's story "rings chillingly true". Lambie found it to be "among the most moving" of recent romances he had seen, praising the "warmth" of the characters' romance contrasting with the "coldness" of the rest of the episode. Lewis thought the scene in which Abi saw the golden ticket Bing had bought "genuinely touching" and his holding Abi's hand was "sweet". Lambie singled out the scene in which Abi gives Bing an origami penguin for praise of Brown Findlay's acting.

The production of the episode was universally praised. Sims lauded the episode as "visually seamless" and Surette enjoyed the "gorgeous visuals". Wollaston described the world as "striking to look at and beautiful". Lambie believed it to be "some of the finest production design, music and acting [...] in a genre television show all year". Surette praised the music as "moving".

=== Black Mirror episode rankings ===
"Fifteen Million Merits" placed middling to poorly on critics' rankings of the 23 installments of Black Mirror, from best to worst:

- 9th – James Hibberd, Entertainment Weekly
- 9th – Morgan Jeffery, Digital Spy
- 9th – Aubrey Page, Collider
- 10th – Charles Bramesco, Vulture
- 15th – Matt Donnelly and Tim Molloy, TheWrap
- 19th – Corey Atad, Esquire
- 20th – Travis Clark, Business Insider
- 22nd – Ed Power, The Telegraph

Meanwhile, Brian Tallerico of Vulture rated Kaluuya's performance the fifth best of Black Mirror, calling it "delicate and subtle".

Other critics ranked the 13 episodes in Black Mirror's first three series, where "Fifteen Million Merits" received an even spreading of rankings:

- 1st – Andrew Wallenstein, Variety
- 2nd (of the Top Ten) – Brendan Doyle, Comingsoon.net
- 6th – Jacob Hall, /Film
- 9th – Adam David, CNN Philippines
- 11th – Mat Elfring, GameSpot
