= Rafe Spall =

English actor (born 1983)

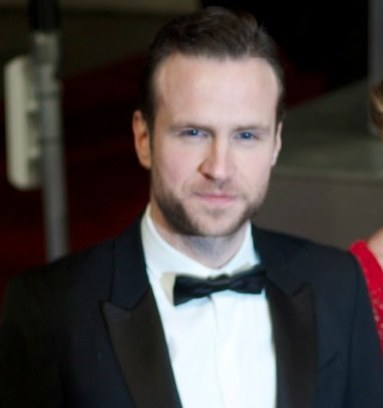
- Spall in 2013
- Born: Rafe Joseph Spall; 10 March 1983 (age 43); London, England
- Occupation: Actor
- Years active: 2001–present
- Spouse: Elize du Toit (m. 2010; div. 2021)
- Partner: Esther Smith (2022–present)
- Children: 4
- Father: Timothy Spall

Rafe Joseph Spall (/ˈreɪf ˈspɔːl/ RAYF SPAWL; born 10 March 1983) is an English actor.

Spall has appeared in films including The Calcium Kid (2004), Green Street (2005), Kidulthood (2006), The Scouting Book for Boys (2009), Anonymous (2011), Life of Pi (2012), I Give It a Year (2013), X+Y (2014), Swallows and Amazons (2016), The Ritual (2017), and Men in Black: International (2019). Spall played the title role of Pete Griffiths in Pete versus Life from 2010 to 2011, and has portrayed characters on the TV series The Shadow Line and Black Mirror. Spall also appeared in the Three Flavours Cornetto trilogy (2004–2013).

Since May 2020, Spall has starred in the Apple TV+ comedy series Trying.

== Early life ==
Rafe Joseph Spall was born on 10 March 1983 at 12 Dunstan's Road in East Dulwich, London, the second of three children of Shane (née Baker) and actor Timothy Spall. Named after the protagonist in The Knight of the Burning Pestle, a role his father played in the Royal Shakespeare Company and one he would later play himself, he always had ambitions to act. His father was diagnosed with myeloid leukaemia when Rafe was 14, and spent the next 18 months in treatment.

Rafe was overweight as a teen, which he calls a "painful" experience. Having achieved poor grades at his school, Haberdashers' Aske's Hatcham College, he left to become an actor and joined the National Youth Theatre at 15. He failed to get into his chosen drama schools, such as RADA, at 17, but worked anyway. After being perennially cast in "fat" roles, he lost 77 lbs (35 kg) at age 19, which brought more acting opportunities.

== Career ==
Spall has frequently collaborated with Edgar Wright, appearing in his films Shaun of the Dead, Hot Fuzz and The World's End with Simon Pegg and Nick Frost. Spall was also in Wright's segment in the 2007 Quentin Tarantino and Robert Rodriguez film Grindhouse. In 2007, Spall performed for the first time with his father in the ITV adaptation of A Room with a View playing father and son.

In 2011, Spall starred in the romantic tragedy movie One Day opposite Anne Hathaway. In 2012, Spall portrayed Canadian author Yann Martel in the Academy Award-winning drama film Life of Pi, directed by Ang Lee. The film was a critical and financial success, winning four Academy Awards and making over $600 million at the box office. In 2013, he played the newlywed husband in I Give It a Year, a comedy about the trials and tribulations of a couple during their first year of marriage.

In 2014, Spall appeared in the coming-of-age drama X+Y, alongside Asa Butterfield and Sally Hawkins, the seasonal family comedy Get Santa, and "White Christmas", an episode of the anthology series Black Mirror. In 2015, he played John Hancock in the History Channel three-part series, Sons of Liberty, alongside Jim Broadbent, and appeared in the Academy Award-winning biographical comedy-drama The Big Short, alongside Christian Bale, Brad Pitt, Ryan Gosling and Steve Carell. Also that year, Spall played Harry Price in Harry Price: Ghost Hunter, ITV's adaptation of Neil Spring's debut novel, The Ghost Hunters. The film aired on ITV1 on 27 December.

In 2018, Spall portrayed Eli Mills in Jurassic World: Fallen Kingdom, and in 2019, had supporting roles in science-fiction action film Men in Black: International and biographical legal drama Just Mercy. Since 2020, Spall has a leading role in the Apple TV+ comedy series Trying, opposite Esther Smith and Imelda Staunton. Also in 2020, he played DS Nick Bailey in the biographical BBC miniseries The Salisbury Poisonings.

In 2021, Spall co-starred with Zahra Newman in the Australian romantic comedy Long Story Short. In 2022, he played David Melmont in the BBC Two/Amazon Prime Video revisionist Western miniseries The English, and portrayed Atticus Finch in the West End production of Aaron Sorkin's To Kill a Mockingbird. In 2024, he appeared in the films William Tell and Rich Flu, while the following year saw him take a supporting role in the Apple TV+ crime drama Smoke. In 2026, in addition to the upcoming fifth season of Trying, he starred in three new television series: Riz Ahmed's Prime Video dramedy Bait, Sky Atlantic crime drama Under Salt Marsh, and ITVX espionage thriller Secret Service.

Spall will lead the cast of Steven Moffat's Channel 4 political comedy-drama Number 10, playing the role of the British Prime Minister. In 2027, he will star as Sherlock Holmes in the Sky series The Death of Sherlock Holmes. He will portray Arthur Weasley in the second season of Harry Potter (2026).

== Personal life ==
Spall says he has always struggled with his weight, going up to 18 stone [114 kg (251 lb)] but said that he was given so many character parts that he attempted to slim down, losing over 5st [32 kg (71 lb)]. Like his father, he is a keen supporter of Crystal Palace. He is a patron of the Actors' Centre.

In February 2008, Spall met actress Elize du Toit; they were married from 2010 to 2021, they lived in West Kensington, London. They have three children together. Spall is now in a relationship with Trying co-star Esther Smith, with whom he has a child born in 2024.

== Acting credits ==
=== Film ===
Key
†	Denotes films that have not yet been released

Year	Title	Role	Notes
2001	Beginner's Luck	Danny	
2004	Shaun of the Dead	Noel	
2004	The Calcium Kid	Stan Parlour	
2005	Green Street Hooligans	Swill	
2005	The Last Drop	Pvt. David Wellings	
2006	Kidulthood	Lenny	
2006	A Good Year	Kenny	
2007	Hot Fuzz	D.C. Andy Cartwright	
2007	Grindhouse	Featured Ghost	Segment: "Don't"
2008	Close	Eric	
2009	The Scouting Book for Boys	Steve	
2009	Modern Life Is Rubbish	Liam	
2010	Behind the Door	Bobby	
2010	Sus	D.C. Wilby	
2011	Anonymous	William Shakespeare	
2011	One Day	Ian Whitehead	
2012	Prometheus	Millburn	
2012	Life of Pi	Writer	
2012	Earthbound	Joe Norman	
2013	I Give It a Year	Josh Moss	
2013	The World's End	Young Man	
2013	The F Word	Ben	Also released as What If
2014	X+Y	Martin Humphreys	Nominated — BIFA for Best Supporting Actor
2014	Get Santa	Steve	
2015	The Big Short	Danny Moses	Nominated – Screen Actors Guild Award for Outstanding Performance by a Cast in a Motion Picture
2016	The BFG	Mr. Tibbs	
2016	Swallows and Amazons	Jim Turner / Captain Flint	
2016	Mum's List	Singe	
2017	The Ritual	Luke	
2018	Jurassic World: Fallen Kingdom	Eli Mills	
2019	Men in Black: International	Agent C	
2019	Just Mercy	Tommy Chapman	
2019	Denmark	Herb	Also released as One Way to Denmark
2021	Long Story Short	Teddy	
2024	William Tell	Werner Stauffacher	
2024	Rich Flu	Toni	
TBA	Fing †	TBA	Filming

=== Television ===
Key
†	Denotes television productions that have not yet been released

Year	Title	Role	Notes
2002	Out of Control	Ray	Television film
2003	The Lion in Winter	Prince John	Television film
2004	The Legend of the Tamworth Two	Crustie	Television film
2005	The Rotters' Club	Sean Harding	3 episodes
2005	Twisted Tales	Dominic	Episode: "Death Metal Chronicles"
2006	The Romantics	John Clare	Miniseries
2006	The Chatterley Affair	Keith	Television film
2006	Cracker	DS McAllister	Episode: "Nine Eleven"
2006	Wide Sargasso Sea	Edward Rochester	Television film
2006	Dracula	Jonathan Harker	Television film
2007	A Room with a View	George Emerson	Television film
2008	He Kills Coppers	Frank Taylor	Television film
2008	Frankie Howerd: Rather You Than Me	Dennis Heymer	Television film
2009	Agatha Christie's Marple	Roger Bassington	Episode: "Why Didn't They Ask Evans?"
2009	Desperate Romantics	William Holman Hunt	6 episodes
2010–2011	Pete Versus Life	Pete Griffiths	11 episodes
2011	The Shadow Line	Jay Wratten	6 episodes
2014	Black Mirror	Joe Potter	Episode: "White Christmas"
2015	Harry Price: Ghost Hunter	Harry Price	Television film
2015	Sons of Liberty	John Hancock	Miniseries
2016	Roadies	Reg Whitehead	10 episodes
2018	Grandpa's Great Escape	Adult Jack (voice)	Television special
2019	The War of the Worlds	George	3 episodes
2020	The Salisbury Poisonings	DS Bailey	TV series
2020–present	Trying	Jason Ross	Main role
2022	The English	David Melmont	Main role
2025	Smoke	Steven Burk	Main role
2026	Bait	Nigel	6 episodes
2026	Under Salt Marsh	Detective Eric Bull	6 episodes
2026	Secret Service	Stuart Henderson	5 episodes
2026	Number 10 †	Prime Minister Harry Douglas	Main role, post-production
2027	The Death of Sherlock Holmes †	The Englishman	Lead role, 6 episodes
2027	Harry Potter †	Arthur Weasley	Recurring role (Season 2)

=== Stage ===
- A Prayer for Owen Meany by Simon Bent at the National Theatre as Harold Crosby/Coach Chickering/Larry Lish (2002)
- Just a Bloke by David Watson at the Royal Court Theatre as Nathan (2002)
- The Knight of the Burning Pestle by Francis Beaumont at the Young Vic Theatre/Barbican Theatre as Rafe (2005)
- John Gabriel Borkman by Henrik Ibsen at the Donmar Warehouse as Erhart Borkman (2007)
- Alaska by DC Moore at the Royal Court Theatre as Frank (2007)
- Hello and Goodbye by Athol Fugard with the English Touring Theatre as Johnny (2008)
- If There Is I Haven't Found It Yet by Nick Payne at the Bush Theatre as Terry (2009)
- Constellations by Nick Payne at the Royal Court Theatre as Roland (2012)
- Betrayal by Harold Pinter at the Ethel Barrymore Theater as Jerry (2013)
- Hedda Gabler by Henrik Ibsen at the Royal National Theatre as Brack (2016)
- Death of England by Roy Williams and Clint Dyer at the Royal National Theatre (2020)
- To Kill a Mockingbird by Aaron Sorkin at the Gielgud Theatre (2022)

=== Radio ===
- The Real Thing BBC Radio 4 as Billy (2006)
- Hide BBC Radio 3 as the convict (2007)
- Words and Music: Crushed BBC Radio 3 as a guest reader (2008)
- Capital narrator (2012)
- Amok Audible.co.uk as Oliver (2015)
