= Thomas Coombes =

English actor

- Born: Thomas Hamilton Coombes; Southend-on-Sea, England
- Education: Guildford School of Acting
- Occupation: Actor

Thomas Hamilton Coombes is an English actor.

== Early life and education ==
Coombes was born in Southend-on-Sea and grew up in Leigh-on-Sea in Essex. He attended The Deanes in Thundersley and SEEVIC. Having began drama classes at the age of six years-old, he performed locally in Essex at venues such as The Palace Theatre in Westcliff-on-Sea and Towngate Theatre in Basildon. He attended Guildford School of Acting and moved to London in 2018.

== Career ==
On stage after drama school, Coombes performed with Birmingham Repertory Theatre and at Shakespeare's Globe. In 2024, Coombes performed in the West End in the title role of the play Death of England: Michael, at the @sohoplace theatre; the production was part of the Death of England: The Plays trilogy, staged together, with Paapa Essiedu the lead in Death of England: Delroy and Erin Doherty and Sharon Duncan-Brewster the leads in Death of England: Closing Time.

On screen, Coombes has early roles in Jekyll and Hyde, Hatton Garden, Knightfall and London Kills as well as the third series of Stan Lee's Lucky Man. He portrayed Goz in Lennie James drama series Save Me in the first and second series, Luther: The Fallen Sun, and Steve McQueen anthology series Small Axe, as well as 2021 film Boiling Point.

Coombes television appearances later included Baby Reindeer, Black Doves and Legends for streaming service Netflix.

== Personal life ==
Coombes is a fan of West Ham United.

== Acting credits ==
=== Film and television ===
Year	Title	Role	Notes
2015	Jekyll and Hyde	Edward Hyde	
2018	Knightfall	Brother Anthony	
2018	Stan Lee's Lucky Man	DC Dan Morrison	
2018-2020	Save Me	Goz	
2019	London Kills	Sammy	
2019	Hatton Garden	Gary Stevenson	
2020	Small Axe	PC Royce	
2021	Boiling Point	Mr. Lovejoy	
2021-2022	EastEnders	Neil/David	
2023	Luther: The Fallen Sun	Archer	
2023	Rain Dogs	John	
2023	Slow Horses	Impounder	
2024	Baby Reindeer	Officer Daniels	
2024	Moonflower Murders	Derek/Eric	
2024	Black Doves	Phillip	
2025	The Crow Girl	Steve Cooper	
2025	Miss Austen	Mr. Dundas	
2025	The Gold	Jed Nixon	
2026	Legends	Shaun	
2026	The Agency	Tom	Series 2
TBA	The Portrait of a Lady †	Mr. Bantling	Upcoming six-part series

=== Theatre ===
Year	Title	Role	Playwright	Notes	Ref.
2024	Death of England: Michael	Michael Fletcher	Clint Dyer and Roy Williams	@sohoplace, London	
