= Charles Mnene =

British film, television and stage actor

- Born: Charles Mnene; Nairobi, Kenya
- Occupation: Actor
- Years active: 2003–present

Charles Mnene (born 11 December) is a British film, television and stage actor.

Mnene's television appearances include guest roles in The Bill, Holby City, Doctors and the drama Ahead of the Class, with Julie Walters, plus several films and stage productions.

His first screen experience was in Thomas Clay's The Great Ecstasy of Robert Carmichael, which caused a stir at Cannes International Film Festival in 2005. He also landed the role of Demetrios in Martha Fiennes' feature film Chromophobia. In 2006, Mnene stirred more controversy in the BAFTA award-winning drama Shoot the Messenger, alongside David Oyelowo and in 2008's Fallout, written by Roy Williams, in which he plays a gang leader who murders one of his classmates.

He has continued to appear in films, stage and television work, including Richard Jobson's New Town Killers, and in writer-director Paul Wilkins' 7 Lives.

== Filmography ==
Year	Series	Role	Notes
2004	Doctors	Billy Marshall	1 episode: "Mother's Pride"
2005	Ahead of the Class	Carl	
2005	Holby City	Robert 'Red' Hopwood	1 episode: "Awakenings"
2005	The Great Ecstasy of Robert Carmichael	Ben	
2005	Chromophobia	Demetrios	
2005	Coming Up	Ashley	1 episode: "Bird's Eye View" with Miranda Raison
2005	The Bill	Jordan Tomlin	11 episodes: "The Bill (series 21) and The Bill (series 22)"
2006	Shoot the Messenger	Germal	
2006	Life and Lyrics	BT	
2007	The Virus	Lead Male	
2007	Saturday's Shadow	Gang Leader	
2008	Changing Climates, Changing Times	Idri M'nati	
2008	Brixton 85	Dex Turner	
2008	Fallout	Emile Banis	
2008	Silent Witness	Keenan Barnes	2 episodes: "Safe: Part 1 & 2"
2008	New Town Killers	Sam	
2009	Exhale	Joel	
2009	Leaving Eva	Adam	
2009	Myths	Orpheus	1 episode: "Escape from the Underworld"
2009	Dubplate Drama	Devil	
2009	Kid	Dahab	
2010	Casualty	Eamon Charles (D-Ray)	1 episode: "The Enemy Within"
2010	Misfits	Derren	
2011	7 Lives	ICE	
2012	Casualty	Anton Tait	
2012	Brash Young Turks	My-Boy	
2012	The Knife That Killed Me	Goddo	
2015	Tatort	Ebi West	1 episode: Schutzlos
2020	Young Wallander	Bashir	
2020	Riding With Sugar	Joshua	
