= Don't shoot the messenger =

Don't shoot the messenger may refer to:

- Shooting the messenger, a metaphorical phrase for blaming the bearer of bad news
- Don't Shoot the Messenger, an EP by Puscifer
- Shoot the Messenger, British TV play
