= Chorus Girls (musical) =

- Written by: Barrie Keeffe; Ray Davies
- Characters: Prince Charles, his bodyguard and various female activists
- Original language: English
- Genre: Musical comedy
- Setting: under-stage at the Theatre Royal, Stratford East

Premiere
- Date premiered: 1981
- Place premiered: Theatre Royal, Stratford East

Chorus Girls was a 1981 musical written by The Kinks lead singer and songwriter Ray Davies, who collaborated with The Long Good Friday screenwriter Barrie Keeffe.

It opened at the Theatre Royal, Stratford East, London starring Marc Sinden and also had a supporting cast of Michael Elphick, Anita Dobson, Lesley Manville, Kate Williams, Sandy Ratcliff and Charlotte Cornwell. Directed by Adrian Shergold, the choreography was by Charles Augins and Jim Rodford of The Kinks played bass with the theatre's 'house band'.

The plot was set around the story that Prince Charles (played by Sinden) was kidnapped by activists wanting to save the theatre building from demolition. Dobson played the girl who falls in love with him, and Elphick played Sinden's inept bodyguard.
