= Shoot the Messenger =

Shoot the Messenger can refer to:

- Shoot the Messenger (film)
- Shoot the Messenger (TV series)
- Shooting the messenger
