= Esther Smith =

English actress (born 1986)

- Born: 28 September 1986 (age 40); Stourbridge, West Midlands, England
- Occupation: Actress
- Years active: 2010–present
- Partner: Rafe Spall (2022–present)
- Children: 1

Esther Smith is an English actress best known for her work in the television series Uncle, Cuckoo and Trying. She is also known for originating the role of Delphi Diggory in the play Harry Potter and the Cursed Child.

== Early life ==
Smith was raised in Stourbridge, West Midlands. Her parents are teachers, and she has a sister, Rachel. Smith began dancing when she was three and was active in her local pantomime company. She studied ballet and contemporary dance at King Edward VI College in Stourbridge, where she began acting, before moving to the Guildford School of Acting at the urging of a teacher.

== Career ==
Shortly after leaving drama school, Smith rose to prominence in 2010 for her role as Trish in Material Girl. She has since had guest appearances on Skins and The Midnight Beast.

In 2014, she replaced Tamla Kari as Rachel for the second series of Cuckoo on BBC Three. She also starred in the ITV2 comedy Cockroaches and had a recurring role on another BBC Three sitcom, Uncle, as Melodie.

In April 2015, Smith starred in Channel 4 show Ballot Monkeys, as assistant to the Liberal Democrats candidate. In February 2016, she appeared in Siblings as Holly, an old flame of Dan's from Circus School.

She was part of the original cast of Harry Potter play Harry Potter and the Cursed Child, portraying Delphi Diggory. In October 2017 she appeared in Parliament Square as Kat at the Royal Exchange, Manchester.

In May 2020, Smith began appearing in Apple TV+ original Trying in the lead role of Nikki. Season 5 premiered in July 2026.

== Personal life ==
Smith is in a relationship with her Trying co-star Rafe Spall, with whom she has a child, born in 2024.

== Filmography ==
=== Television ===
Year	Title	Role	Notes
2010	Material Girl	Trish	Main role
2013	Skins	Emma	2 episodes
2013	Holby City	Roxanne Gregson	Episode: "All at Sea"
2014–2017	Uncle	Melodie	10 episodes
2014	The Midnight Beast	Ronnie	4 episodes
2014	The Smoke	Mother	1 episode
2014–2019	Cuckoo	Rachel	Main role (27 episodes); replaced Tamla Kari
2014	Black Mirror	Madge	Episode: "White Christmas"
2015	Cockroaches	Suze	
2015	Ballot Monkeys	Charlotte Guthrie	
2016	Zapped	Gwendolyn	Episode: "Barrel"
2016	Siblings	Holly	Episode: "Baby Sack"
2019	Defending the Guilty	Hannah	1 Episode
2020–present	Trying	Nikki Newman	Main role
2021	Dodo	Mom Mrs Connoly	11 Episodes
2026	The Reluctant Vampire	Susan	6 episodes

=== Film ===
Year	Title	Role	Notes
2015	Funny Valentines: Elephant (Nick Helm)	"Her"	Short film (BBC iPlayer)
2017	New Year	Alice	Short film
2017	Confection	Ms. Kripps	Short film
2018	F*ck	Sarah	Short film

== Theatre credits ==
Year	Title	Role	Theatre	Notes
2009	The Author	Esther	Royal Court Theatre	
2010	Romeo and Juliet	Juliet Capulet	Mosaica @ The Chocolate Factory	
2010	The Author	Esther	North Wall Arts Centre	
2010	The Author	Esther	Northern Stage	
2010	The Author	Esther	Warwick Arts Centre	
2010	The Author	Esther	Birmingham Repertory Theatre	
2010	The Author	Esther	Royal Exchange	
Unknown	Limbs (Present Tense)	Woman	Nabokov Theatre	
2011	Many Moons	Juniper Jessops	Theatre503	
Unknown	Carrot	Michelle	Theatre503	
Unknown	When it Falls	Gillian	Soho Theatre	
2012	The Honey Man	Misty	Guildhall Theatre	
2012	The Honey Man	Misty	Terry O'Toole Theatre	
2012	The Honey Man	Misty	Kirkgate Centre	
2012	NSFW	Charlotte	Royal Court Theatre	
2016–2017	Harry Potter and the Cursed Child	Delphi Diggory	Palace Theatre	
2017–2018	Parliament Square	Kat	Royal Exchange	
2017–2018	Parliament Square	Kat	Bush Theatre	
