= The Great Ecstasy of Robert Carmichael =

2005 drama film by Thomas Clay

- DVD cover
- Directed by: Thomas Clay
- Written by: Thomas Clay; Joseph Lang
- Produced by: Joseph Lang
- Starring: Daniel Spencer; Lesley Manville; Danny Dyer
- Cinematography: Yorgos Arvanitis
- Edited by: David Wigram
- Music by: Edward Elgar; Jonathan Henry Harvey; Amy Purcell
- Production companies: Boudu Film LLP; Wild Bunch
- Distributed by: Tartan Films
- Release dates: 15 May 2005 (Cannes); 20 October 2006 (UK)
- Running time: 96 minutes
- Country: United Kingdom
- Language: English

The Great Ecstasy of Robert Carmichael is a 2005 British crime film directed by Thomas Clay in his feature-length directorial debut and written by Clay and Joseph Lang. It stars Daniel Spencer as the titular character, a teenager whose life spirals out of control after experimenting with drugs with schoolmates.

The film premiered at the Cannes Film Festival as part of the Critic's Week sidebar, where it was nominated for the Camera d'Or award. It also screened at the Edinburgh Film Festival. At both premieres, the film was greeted with negative responses for its graphic violence. At Cannes, the film's ending prompted audience walkouts.

== Plot ==
In the days leading up to the Iraq War, Robert Carmichael is an introverted middle-class youth and talented cello player who is bored by his existence in the coastal town of Newhaven. He becomes associated with the unsavory teenagers Joe and Ben. Joe's cousin Larry returns to town after serving prison time for drug possession and aggravated assault. Larry immediately gets back into the drugs business and pushes the younger boys into becoming dealers; Robert soon spirals into the use of hard drugs like cocaine and ecstasy. At one point, the gang rapes a teenage girl in a squalid flat. Though Robert does not participate in the act, he takes part when the gang later attacks a middle-aged couple.

== Main cast ==
- Daniel Spencer as Robert Carmichael
- Lesley Manville as Sarah Carmichael
- Danny Dyer as Larry Haydn
- Ryan Winsley as Joe
- Charles Mnene as Ben
- Michael Howe as Jonathan Abbott
- Miranda Wilson as Monica Abbott
- Grace Kemp as concert goer

== Release ==
The film premiered at the 2005 Cannes Film Festival, where the film's final scene involving a brutal rape depiction caused mass walkouts. The audience response at the Edinburgh Film Festival screening was similarly negative. In a post-screening Q&A session, director Thomas Clay and co-screenwriter Joseph Lang defended the graphic violence by insisting that they wanted to evoke how rape is used as a weapon in the wars of Bosnia and Iraq.

== Reception ==
Though the film's technical aspects were praised, critics opined that the film was exploitative and gratuitously violent. In The Guardian, Peter Bradshaw wrote, "Theo Angelopoulos's cinematographer, Yorgos Arvanitis, has created for him some memorable images, and his scenes of the eerie deserted beach, with its hallucinatory glimpses of the past, are intended perhaps to recall those in Angelopoulos's Eternity and a Day. But all this style is in the service of ... what, exactly?" He concluded that the film's "combination of high arthouse ambition, uncertain acting and brutal violence left me with a nasty taste in the mouth". The Daily Telegraph lamented it as "a total sham".

Leslie Felperin of Variety said the filmmakers' defense of the film as a metaphor for the brutality of war "almost persuades, particularly since the script itself makes canny reference to Elim Klimov's war-film masterpiece Come and See, which similarly aims to brutalize the viewer into enlightenment. But Ecstasy is no Come and See. Its ironies are too on the nose, at times nearly sophomoric. In the end, it plays like the work of an extremely talented but still jejune filmmaker, who on a more practical level has a long way to go yet in terms of working with thesps".

On the review aggregator website Rotten Tomatoes, 40% of 10 critics' reviews are positive, with an average rating of 4.7/10.
