= Frozen Assets (play) =

1978 play by Barrie Keeffe

Frozen Assets is a 1978 play by Barrie Keeffe, written for the Royal Shakespeare Company. The play is "about what happens to a youth after he kills a prison guard". A production of the play was put on by director Will MacAdam at the NY Theatre Ensemble in 1983. Clive Mantle starred in a radio adaptation of it. A revival of the play was put on by the Shattered Globe Theatre of Chicago under Nick Bowling from January 1999. It was praised by the Chicago Sun-Times as "hugely entertaining", a "marvelous blend of satire and social commentary and class-based screwball comedy". In 1989 Frozen Assets was also staged at the Half Moon Theatre in Stepney, East London with Marc Tufano playing the lead role of Buddy Clark.
