= Death of England =

Play by Clint Dyer and Roy Williams

Death of England is a trilogy of plays by Clint Dyer and Roy Williams which all premiered at the Royal National Theatre in London with Michael in January 2020, followed by Delroy in October 2020 and Closing Time in October 2023. The trilogy was revived at @sohoplace in the West End in July 2024.

== Play trilogy ==
=== Michael ===
Death of England: Michael
- Original language: English
- Written by: Clint Dyer; Roy Williams
- Genre: Drama

Premiere
- Date: 31 January 2020
- Place: Dorfman Theatre, National Theatre, London

Michael (originally Death of England) is the first part of the trilogy which opened at the National Theatre, London in the Dorfman Theatre beginning previews on 31 January, with a press night on 6 February, running until 7 March 2020. The production was directed by Clint Dyer and featured Rafe Spall as Michael.

The play was originally a 'microplay' titled Off the Page: Death of England. One of several microplays that were produced in 2014 for free online distribution by The Guardian in collaboration with the Royal Court Theatre.

The playtext was released on 9 April 2020 by Methuen Drama.

The play was revived at @sohoplace in London's West End as part of the trilogy from 15 July to 28 September 2024 with Thomas Coombes as Michael.

=== Delroy ===
Death of England: Delroy
- Original language: English
- Written by: Clint Dyer; Roy Williams
- Genre: Drama

Premiere
- Date: 21 October 2020
- Place: Olivier Theatre, National Theatre, London

Delroy is the second part of the trilogy and began previews on 21 October 2020, the play marked the re-opening of the National Theatre, London during the COVID-19 pandemic using social distancing measures in the Olivier Theatre. The production was again directed by Clint Dyer and featured Michael Balogun in the title role of Delroy (originally due to be played by Giles Terera who had to withdraw from the production in rehearsals due to undergoing emergency surgery.)

Despite initially being announced to run until 28 November 2020, the production was forced to close on 4 November 2020 (the production's press night) due to the Government advice of Coronavirus lockdown measures. The play returned to the Olivier stage at the National Theatre in spring 2021 with Balogun reprising the role of Delroy.

The playtext was released on 21 October 2020 by Methuen Drama.

The play was revived at @sohoplace in London's West End as part of the trilogy from 15 July to 28 September 2024 with Paapa Essiedu as Delroy.

=== Closing Time ===
Death of England: Closing Time
- Original language: English
- Written by: Clint Dyer; Roy Williams
- Genre: Drama

Premiere
- Date: 18 September 2023
- Place: Dorfman Theatre, National Theatre, London

Closing Time is the third and final chapter of the trilogy which opened in the Dorfman Theatre at the National Theatre, London on 18 September 2023 running until 11 November. It featured Jo Martin as Denise and Hayley Squires as Carly, however Martin had to withdraw from the production during the run. Sharon Duncan-Brewster took over in the role of Denise until closing.

The play will be revived at @sohoplace in London's West End as part of the trilogy from 15 July to 28 September 2024 with Duncan-Brewster reprising the role of Denise with Erin Doherty as Carly.

== Face to Face (film) ==
Death of England: Face to Face is a 2021 film directed by Clint Dyer and features Giles Terera as Delroy and Neil Maskell as Michael. This was performed and filmed in the Lyttelton Theatre at the National Theatre in London on 25 November 2021, premiering the same day at 10pm on Sky Arts.
