= Verity Bargate =

English novelist and theatre director

Verity Eileen Bargate (1940–1981) was an English novelist and theatre director.

In 1969, she co-founded the cutting-edge Soho Theatre Company, later known as the Soho Theatre. She also wrote three novels, No Mama No, Children Crossing, and Tit for Tat.

Her first husband was Soho Theatre co-founder Fred Proud. Her second husband, till her death, was the playwright and screenwriter Barrie Keeffe.

She died of cancer at the age of 40. After her death, the Verity Bargate Award was set up in her memory to encourage and reward new writing in the theatre.
