= Trying (TV series) =

British comedy television series

- Genre: Comedy
- Created by: Andy Wolton
- Starring: Esther Smith; Rafe Spall
- Composers: Paul Saunderson; Guy Garvey; Peter Jobson; Maisie Peters; Bear's Den; Joe Rubel; Orla Gartland
- Country of origin: United Kingdom
- Original language: English
- No. of series: 5
- No. of episodes: 40

Production
- Executive producers: Andy Wolton; Jim O'Hanlon; Josh Cole; Chris Sussman; Esther Smith; Rafe Spall; Sam Pinnell
- Producers: Emma Lawson; Tim Mannion
- Editors: Mark Thornton; Mark Hermida; Andy Kinnear; Joe Randall-Cutler; Mark Henson; Peter Oliver; Nick Ames
- Camera setup: Single-camera
- Running time: 26–30 minutes
- Production company: BBC Studios Drama Productions

Original release
- Network: Apple TV+
- Release: 1 May 2020 – 3 July 2024
- Network: Apple TV
- Release: 8 July 2026 – present

Trying is a British comedy television series created by Andy Wolton. A co-production between Apple TV+ and BBC, the first series premiered on 1 May 2020 on Apple TV+. The series stars Esther Smith and Rafe Spall as couple Nikki and Jason, respectively, and initially focuses on their desire to become parents. As of 2024, it has aired four series in total: the fourth series, which continues Trying after a six year time-jump, premiered on 22 May 2024. In 2025, the series was released on BBC iPlayer, as well as receiving a linear television broadcast on BBC One. In May 2025, Trying was renewed for a fifth series, which premiered on 8 July 2026.

== Premise ==
The series follows Nikki and Jason, a couple who really want to become parents but who struggle with conceiving a child. In order to have a baby they decide to adopt, only to face a whole list of new challenges and surprises that come with the adoption process. Additionally, Series 4 begins with a six year time-jump and focuses on Nikki and Jason as they deal with life as parents and all the trials and tribulations that come with it.

== Cast and characters ==
=== Main ===
- Esther Smith as Nikki Newman, an employee at a car rental company who wants to become a mother with partner Jason. They later become parents to Princess and Tyler.
- Rafe Spall as Jason Ross, a former English teacher turned taxi driver who wants to become a father with partner Nikki. They later become parents to Princess and Tyler.
- Sian Brooke as Karen, Nikki's sister, Scott's wife and Stevie's mother. She is initially a teacher but becomes a novelist.
- Darren Boyd as Scott, Karen's eccentric husband and father to Stevie.
- Ophelia Lovibond as Erica (series 1–2), Nikki's best friend and Freddy's ex-wife.
- Oliver Chris as Freddy, Jason's best friend who owns a sporting goods company.
- Imelda Staunton as Penny (series 1–2), Nikki and Jason's adoption officer.
- Phil Davis as Vic Ross, Jason's father.
- Paula Wilcox as Sandra Ross (series 1–3), Jason's mother.
- Marian McLoughlin as Jilly Newman, Nikki's mother.
- Roderick Smith as John Newman, Nikki's father.
- Robyn Cara as Jen (series 1–3), Nikki's younger co-worker and friend who is quirky and learning to be an adult.
- Fola Evans-Akingbola as Harper (series 2), Freddy's girlfriend after his divorce.
- Scarlett Rayner as Princess (series 4–5), Nikki and Jason's daughter and Tyler's sister, age 16
  - Eden Togwell as Princess (series 2–3), age 10
- Cooper Turner as Tyler (series 4–5), Nikki and Jason's son and Princess' brother, age 12
  - Mickey McAnulty as Tyler (series 2–3), age 6

=== Recurring ===
- Cush Jumbo as Jane (series 1), Jason's ex.
- Susannah Wise as Denise (series 1–2 and 4), a friend of Nikki and Jason's at the adoption support group.
- Bruce MacKinnon as Ben (series 1–2 and 4), a friend of Nikki and Jason's at the adoption support group.
- Justine Mitchell as Lizzie (series 1–2), a friend of Nikki and Jason's at the adoption support group.
- Diana Pozharskaya as Sofia (series 1), a student of Jason's.
- Navin Chowdhry as Deven (series 2), a father who has a kid in Karen's school.
- Ciara Baxendale as Amy (series 2–3), Karen's co-worker.
- James Doherty as Terry (series 2–3), Nikki's boss.
- Clare Higgins as Bev Reid (series 3–4), Princess and Tyler's grandmother.
- Karl Collins as Noah (series 3–4), Nikki and Jason's social worker.
- Matilda Flower as Stevie (series 4), Karen and Scott's daughter.

== Episodes ==
Series	Episodes	Originally released		
Series	Episodes	First released	Last released	Network
1	8	1 May 2020		Apple TV+
2	8	21 May 2021	2 July 2021	Apple TV+
3	8	22 July 2022	2 September 2022	Apple TV+
4	8	22 May 2024	3 July 2024	Apple TV+
5	8	8 July 2026	26 August 2026	Apple TV

=== Series 1 (2020) ===
No. overall	No. in series	Title	Directed by	Written by	Original release date
1	1	"Nikki and Jason"	Jim O'Hanlon	Andy Wolton	1 May 2020
Unable to conceive naturally and with IVF unlikely to succeed, Camden-dwelling thirty-somethings Nikki Newman (a call-centre operative) and Jason Ross (an English-language teacher) decide to pursue adoption as the solution to filling the child-shaped void in their lives.
2	2	"The Ex-Girlfriend"	Jim O'Hanlon	Andy Wolton	1 May 2020
Aware that the adoption agency will conduct background checks, Nikki and Jason set about presenting themselves in the best possible light. Whilst Nikki meets sister Karen and her insufferable boyfriend Scott, Jason meets with ex-girlfriend Jane in order to secure a good character reference should she be approached. Absentmindedly, Nikki and Jason send the adoption agency a list of all their character flaws.
3	3	"Tickets for a Queue"	Jim O'Hanlon	Andy Wolton	1 May 2020
At an adoption support group picnic, Nikki develops an inferiority complex, alarmed by the fact there are many other couples also vying to adopt children, some more educated and financially better off than they are. Jason makes her realise that the people they need to impress are not their peers or even the social workers, but the kids they hope to adopt.
4	4	"Rainbow Castle People"	Jim O'Hanlon	Andy Wolton	1 May 2020
Hung over after a night out to celebrate best friend Freddy's birthday, Nikki and Jason forget about a home visit by Penny from the adoption agency. With limited time and in an effort to make a good impression the couple pull out all the stops, tidying the house and refurnishing it by borrowing from Nikki's parents. Penny however is canny enough to see through most of the subterfuge.
5	5	"Someone Else's Kids"	Jim O'Hanlon	Andy Wolton	1 May 2020
Nikki and Jason volunteer to babysit in order to get some experience in childcare. Nikki arranges a treasure hunt across London, which initially captures the kids' imaginations but quickly fails to keep their interest, leaving Nikki feeling like a failure. Meanwhile the adoption agency interviews all the referees on the application.
6	6	"Show Me the Love"	Jim O'Hanlon	Andy Wolton	1 May 2020
Hearing Freddy confess to an affair, blaming the stress of family life, makes Jason doubt whether he wants to go through with adoption and take on something that will affect every aspect of the rest of his life. Sensing his cold feet, Nikki is upset when she learns he only agreed to adoption in an effort to make her happy.
7	7	"Good Old Family Map"	Jim O'Hanlon	Andy Wolton	1 May 2020
With a week to go until the interview with the adoption panel, Nikki and Jason invite their friends and family support network to a party, including both sets of would-be grandparents and newly-engaged sister Karen with fiancee Scott. The party, of course, goes anything but to plan.
8	8	"We Know the Way Out"	Jim O'Hanlon	Andy Wolton	1 May 2020
Kicked out after confessing his affair to wife Erica, Freddy is now occupying the spare room at Nikki and Jason's. At the adoption panel Nikki's medication for anxiety is picked up by the committee. After a rambling but heartfelt plea by Jason, they are approved subject to attending counselling.

=== Series 2 (2021) ===
No. overall	No. in season	Title	Directed by	Written by	Original release date
9	1	"A Nice Boy"	Jim O'Hanlon	Andy Wolton	21 May 2021
Nikki and Jason realise they have different expectations when it comes to the gender of their potential child. Eventually they express interest in adopting 7-year-old James. Freddy moves into his own apartment but finds reconciliation with Erica via a Staghorn fern and a swim in the Regent's Canal.
10	2	"The Sun on Your Back"	Jim O'Hanlon	Andy Wolton	21 May 2021
Now a manager, Jason finds his new role rather challenging so seeks advice from Freddy. Nikki helps Karen select a wedding dress but is on tenterhooks with the expectation of news from the adoption agency. When it eventually arrives they find they have been unsuccessful, but Penny softens the blow by offering the chance of meeting some children at an adoption activity day, where Nikki catches sight of Princess.
11	3	"Big Heads"	Jim O'Hanlon	Andy Wolton	28 May 2021
Jason and Nikki head to Cornwall for his grandmother's funeral where Jason bumps into an old girlfriend, who has a son that was born soon after their relationship ended some 16 years previously. Nikki learns Princess has a younger brother whilst Karen starts to have doubts about Scott.
12	4	"Helicopters"	Jim O'Hanlon	Andy Wolton	4 June 2021
At Princess's school, Nikki and Jason get the opportunity to observe her with brother Tyler. With approval to adopt only one child they know that the siblings will have to be split up, but are excited nevertheless. Unbeknown to them, a family that can adopt both children is under consideration.
13	5	"Maddest Sweetest Thing"	Jim O'Hanlon	Andy Wolton	11 June 2021
Once again Penny delivers the bad news. When Nikki tries to convince her they are also capable of adopting both children, the lack of a separate bedroom for each child proves a stumbling block. Jason's father Vic comes to the rescue by reconfiguring the existing space to create an extra bedroom.
14	6	"A Long Way Down"	Jim O'Hanlon	Andy Wolton	18 June 2021
At a party with other couples trying to adopt, Nikki and Jason realise the other couple trying to adopt Princess and Tyler are none other than their hosts. Karen's doubts that Scott may not be the man for her grow and she seeks solace with Deven, single dad and father of one of her pupils.
15	7	"Lift Me Up"	Jim O'Hanlon	Andy Wolton	25 June 2021
Just as Nikki receives news that she has been successfully promoted at work, Jason is informed they were unsuccessful in their attempt to adopt Princess and Tyler. On her hen night, Karen confesses to Nikki that she is thinking of calling off the wedding, but later has a change of heart.
16	8	"I'm Scared"	Jim O'Hanlon	Andy Wolton	2 July 2021
After Karen's wedding ceremony, Penny arrives just as Jason is proposing to Nikki to inform them that Princess's and Tyler's placements have broken down. She asks them if they would take Princess on a temporary basis with no guarantee of adoption. On arriving home with Princess they discover Tyler stowed away in the boot of their car and vow to try and keep the siblings together.

=== Series 3 (2022) ===
No. overall	No. in series	Title	Directed by	Written by	Original release date
17	1	"Home"	Elliot Hegarty	Andy Wolton	22 July 2022
Jason resigns himself to Tyler being separated from his sister, so decides to give the kids a wonderful time whilst they are both still together, but his father Vic refuses to give up without a fight. Noah from the council decides to let Tyler stay, but warns the couple that in 3 months they will need to go before a family court and convince the judge too.
18	2	"The Circle"	Elliot Hegarty	Andy Wolton	22 July 2022
With only 3 months left on their tenancy, Jason discovers the landlord has decided to sell the flat when a For Sale sign goes up outside. He formulates a plan to buy the place himself. At work, Nikki in her new role as management, is tasked with selecting one of the telesales team for dismissal.
19	3	"Capture the Flag"	Elliot Hegarty	Andy Wolton	29 July 2022
During a camping weekend, Nikki fears she has not been able to connect with Princess and Tyler who seem to be bonding more with Jason. Karen realises what she most dislikes about her job as a teacher is children. After feeling ill, she takes a pregnancy test and finds she is expecting a child of her own.
20	4	"Little Steps"	Elliot Hegarty	Andy Wolton	5 August 2022
Karen reveals her pregnancy to Nikki's surprise, but finds it difficult to break the news to husband Scott. At his birthday party, Tyler, feeling overwhelmed, hides under a table until Nikki reassures him. Karen takes the opportunity to break the news to Scott through the medium of mime.
21	5	"Pick a Side"	Jim O'Hanlon	Andy Wolton	12 August 2022
Discovering that Tyler supports Arsenal, Jason makes a sacrifice and wears their colours despite his lifelong love for Spurs. Nikki finds it difficult to be tough with Princess, acquiescing to her demands in an attempt to be liked by her. When she discovers Princess has been shoplifting, Nikki takes her back to the shop to return the item.
22	6	"Feelings Are the Worst"	Jim O'Hanlon	Andy Wolton	19 August 2022
Nikki and Jason discover the children's grandmother Bev has tracked them down. After a meeting at the council, the couple are divided regarding her motives and whether she can be trusted. Subsequently Bev makes a complaint to the council saying they are unfit to take the children. Jason receives news that the flat has been sold and they must vacate it in two months.
23	7	"What a Banker"	Jim O'Hanlon	Andy Wolton	26 August 2022
With pressures mounting, Nikki and Jason's relationship comes under strain. Nikki starts to doubt if they are indeed the best thing for the kids. After a disastrous Book launch Scott starts to come to the realisation that maybe writing is not his forte, but it is perhaps Karen's.
24	8	"The End of the Beginning"	Jim O'Hanlon	Andy Wolton	2 September 2022
On the day of the adoption hearing, Nikki's confidence of success is at an all time low, so Jason proposes they get married whilst all still together as a family. At the hearing Bev makes it clear she does not want to lose her grandchildren, but is reassured when Nikki tells her there will always be a place for her in the children's lives. With the court approving the adoption, they learn the identity of the flat's new owner.

=== Series 4 (2024) ===
No. overall	No. in series	Title	Directed by	Written by	Original release date
25	1	"The Send-Off"	Ellie Heydon	Andy Wolton	22 May 2024
Six years have passed and it is the day of Bev's funeral. Nikki worries that the children's birth mother, Kat, might show up. At the wake in the local pub it transpires that Bev had maxed out her credit cards when the end was approaching and bought gifts for everyone. Princess tries to coerce Jason into telling his father that he loves him, but he finds it too awkward to say directly so does it by using a football metaphor. Princess has been left a car by Bev which belonged to her birth mother.
26	2	"Ghosting"	Ellie Heydon	Andy Wolton	22 May 2024
After searching for her mother online, Princess goes to her place of work, only to find that she has the wrong person. She crosses her off and proceeds to the next Kat Reid on her list. Nikki discovers that Bev had a date lined up from a match-making website, and rather than inform the other party about Bev's death she confirms the date with the intention of breaking the news in person. Princess confides in Karen about the search for her birth mother. Scott is guilt-ridden about his part in the climate emergency when his daughter takes an interest in Earth Day.
27	3	"Murder at Slaughterbridge Manor"	Ellie Heydon	James Wood & Andy Wolton	29 May 2024
Scott has arranged a murder mystery weekend to celebrate his 50th birthday with himself as the victim. Vic decides to start dating again and Princess helps him create a profile on a match-making website. Later that evening, Jason struggles to say anything meaningful about Scott in a speech he was asked to give and Scott reveals he has decided to single handedly row across the Atlantic Ocean. Princess discovers an old sat nav in her car which has Kat's home address in Brighton listed.
28	4	"Road Trip"	Ellie Heydon	Andy Wolton	5 June 2024
Jason decides to start his own football team for Tyler and all the other kids who do not get a chance. Princess fakes an excuse to go to Brighton with Karen to track down Kat. When Nikki decides to accompany them, Princess is in two minds about how to proceed. Eventually she gets rid of Nikki long enough the check out the address only to discover that Kat has not lived there for a few years. Scott takes swimming lessons in preparation for his rowing challenge.
29	5	"Mother's Day"	Ellie Heydon	Oriane Messina & Fay Rusling & Andy Wolton	12 June 2024
It is Mother's Day. Nikki, Princess, Jilly and Karen have a day at the spa. Jason takes his football squad to an escape room for a team building exercise. Scott starts his own podcast and interviews a transatlantic rower who was nearly killed after a freak wave. He suddenly realises how dangerous the challenge is. Whilst in a sauna, Karen tries to persuade Princess to come clean with Nikki about trying to find Kat, however she is unaware that Nikki has overheard everything. When Princess visits Bev's grave she finds flowers from Kat.
30	6	"Airport Run"	Ellie Heydon	Andy Wolton	19 June 2024
Princess rings the florist who delivered Kat's bouquet and manages get Kat's address from her. She is surprised to learn it is in Mallorca. Whilst Nikki and Jason are participating in a Q&A about adoption for other prospective parents, Princess books a flight to the island using Nikki's credit card. Nikki and Jason intercept Princess at the airport and Nikki spontaneously decides to go to Mallorca to get answers for Princess.
31	7	"White Lies"	Ellie Heydon	Andy Wolton	26 June 2024
When Nikki eventually tracks down Kat, she does not reveal who she is at the outset. The two women spend the day together and start to get to know each other. Jason enlists the help of the entire family to complete Princess's outstanding coursework. When Kat discovers a photo of herself in Nikki's bag, the truth is finally revealed, but before Nikki can get any answers Kat vanishes once again. Nikki subsequently tells Princess that she was unable to track down her birth mother.
32	8	"Scott of the Atlantic"	Ellie Heydon	Andy Wolton	3 July 2024
Despite everyone's doubts, Scott is determined to set off on his transatlantic rowing challenge. Only after Karen's intervention does he finally change his mind. Jason decides to change career and retrain to become a social worker. Meanwhile, Scott changes his mind once again and sets off on his transatlantic rowing challenge. Princess discovers photos of Kat on Nikki's mobile phone just as Kat turns up outside the house in Camden.

=== Series 5 (2026) ===
No. overall	No. in series	Title	Directed by	Written by	Original release date
33	1	"Rollercoaster"	Ollie Parsons	Andy Wolton	8 July 2026
34	2	"First Days"	Ollie Parsons	Andy Wolton	15 July 2026
35	3	"The Mousetrap"	Ollie Parsons	Andy Wolton	22 July 2026
36	4	"The Hurricane"	Ollie Parsons	Andy Wolton	29 July 2026
37	5	"Ick"	Ollie Parsons	Andy Wolton	5 August 2026
38	6	"Halloween"	Ollie Parsons	Andy Wolton	12 August 2026
39	7	"Tuscany"	Ollie Parsons	Andy Wolton	19 August 2026
40	8	"WoodScott"	Ollie Parsons	Andy Wolton	26 August 2026

== Production ==
Promotional poster for season 4

=== Development ===
On 12 July 2019, it was reported that Apple Inc. and the BBC were working together for a new comedy series with the working title Alabama. Production on the series was already underway with the series set to be released sometime in 2020. Trying is the second co-production between Apple and the BBC after reboot Prehistoric Planet was announced two months prior. On 19 January 2020, Apple formally announced the series in a press release with the official title Trying. It was created by Andy Wolton.

On 1 May 2020, Esther Smith confirmed in an interview with Metro that a second series of Trying had been commissioned by Apple. English singer-songwriter Maisie Peters wrote and performed the soundtrack for the series. With the announcement of a 14 May 2021 second series release date, Apple also announced their decision to renew Trying for a third series. Ahead of the series three finale, Apple announced that they had renewed it for a fourth series. The fourth series featured a time jump, with events moving forwards by six years. After the conclusion of series four, it was renewed for a fifth series.

=== Casting ===
Alongside the initial report of the series in July 2019, it was announced that Imelda Staunton would feature in the series. In the press release of January 2020, Apple announced that Rafe Spall and Esther Smith would also star in the series.

=== Release ===
Trying premiered on Apple TV+ on 1 May 2020, releasing all at once. The second series premiered on 21 May the following year, releasing 2 episodes initially, with the rest of the series releasing weekly. The following two series released the same way as series two, on 22 July 2022 and 22 May 2024. In 2025, it was announced that Trying would become available on BBC iPlayer on 15 September of that year, as well as airing on linear television.

== Reception ==
=== Critical response ===
On the review aggregator website Rotten Tomatoes, for the first series, 88% of 25 critics' reviews are positive, with an average rating of 7.3/10. Metacritic, which uses a weighted average, assigned the film a score of 69 out of 100, based on eight critics, indicating "generally favourable reviews".

For the second series, 100% of 17 critics' reviews are positive, with an average rating of 8.5/10.

For the fourth series, 100% of 10 critics' reviews are positive.

For the fifth series, 100% of 6 critics' reviews are positive.

=== Accolades ===
The song "Neck of the Woods" by Maisie Peters and Joe Rubel was nominated for Best Original Song in a TV Show/Limited Series by the Hollywood Music in Media Awards in 2021.
