= Clint Dyer =

English actor, director, and playwright

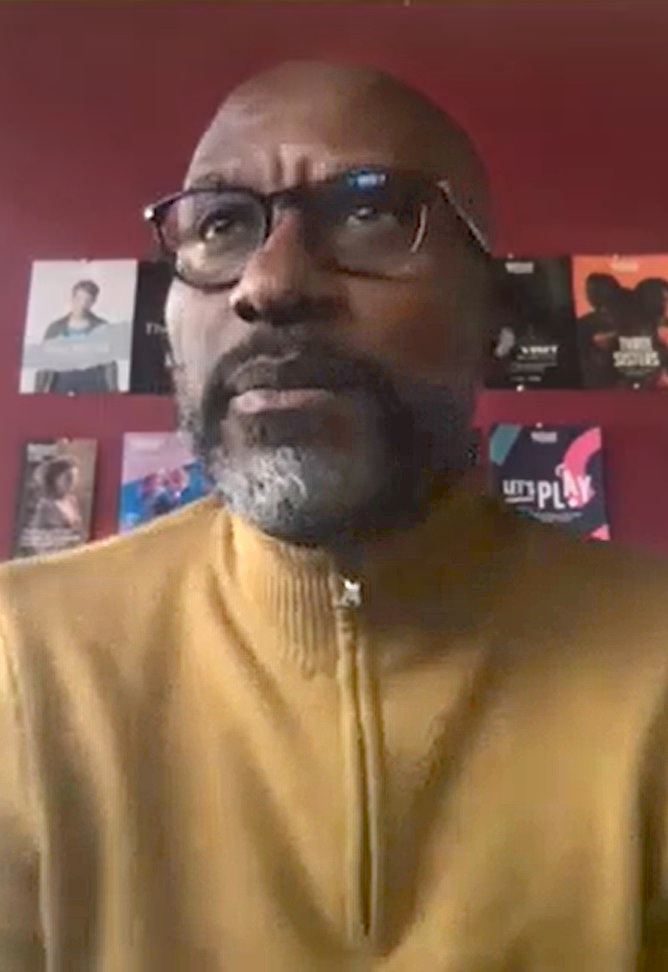
- Dyer in 2022
- Born: 4 November 1968 (age 57); Upton Park, London
- Education: East 15 Acting School
- Occupations: Actor; director; playwright
- Writing career
- Genre: Drama
- Notable works: As actor; Sus (2010); Black Mirror (2018); As writer; Death of England; As director; The Big Life; Get Up, Stand Up! The Bob Marley Musical

Clint Dyer (born 4 November 1968) is an English actor, director, and playwright. He was director of the premier production of The Big Life, whose transfer to Apollo Theatre in 2005 made him the first Black British director of a musical in the West End. In 2022, he was the first Black director of a professional production of Othello in the UK. As a playwright, he is best known for the Death of England trilogy (co-written with Roy Williams), which was premiered at the National Theatre between 2020 and 2023, followed by a revival at @sohoplace theatre in 2024. Dyer was Deputy Artistic Director of the National Theatre from 2021 to 2025.

== Early life and education ==
Dyer was born in 1968 in Upton Park, East London, a "poverty-stricken" neighbourhood that was "seething with racial tension" when he was growing up. His parents had separately migrated to England from Jamaica in 1958 and 1961. His mother worked as a nurse and his father worked for the Ford Motor Company. As a child, he was a supporter of West Ham United F.C. and had wanted to become a footballer before being deterred from the sport due to his experiences of racist abuse.

Dyer attended Theatre Royal Stratford East's Youth Theatre from the age of 14, where he was mentored by director Philip Hedley. He also completed his A Levels in film studies, drama, and English literature at Barking College of Technology. He later studied acting at the East 15 Acting School, part of the University of Essex.

== Career ==
=== Acting ===
Dyer has worked as an actor, director, and writer. As an actor, his first major role on stage was as Zwanini in the production of Michele Celeste's Hanging the President at Battersea Arts Centre in 1990, replacing Adrian Lester who had portrayed the same character in the original production at Traverse Theatre, Edinburgh. Another major role in his early career was as Randall in Mike Leigh's It's a Great Big Shame in 1993, which Dyer said to have opened him up to bigger opportunities on stage as well as on the screen. He starred as Delroy in the 2000 revival production of Sus by Barrie Keeffe and later reprised this role in the 2010 film adaptation of the play as well as the stage revival at the Young Vic in addition to a UK tour in the same year. For his role in the film adaptation, he won Best Male Performance in Film at the 2011 Screen Nation Film and Television Awards as well as the Best Actor Award at British Urban Film Festival 2015 (in a special edition which considered submissions over the last 1 years0).

Other notable stage appearances by Dyer were: Big White Fog (Almeida Theatre, 2007); Perseverance Drive and The Royale (Bush Theatre, 2014 and 2015); Ma Rainey's Black Bottom (National Theatre, 2016); and The Kid Stays in the Picture (Royal Court Theatre, 2017).

=== Directing and writing ===
Dyer made his directorial debut with The Big Life, a musical adaptation of Love's Labour's Lost inspired by the Windrush generation, which premiered at Theatre Royal Stratford East in 2004 before transferring to Apollo Theatre in 2005. The Big Life was said to be the first "black, British musical" staged in the West End and Dyer the first Black British director of a West End musical.

Dyer and Roy Williams were the co-writers of the trilogy of plays at the National Theatre (and later @sohoplace) entitled Death of England (2020-2024), as well as the film Death of England: Face to Face (2021), all directed by Dyer. He had previously directed the 2014 short film Death of England, written solely by Williams for the Off the Page series, a collaboration between Royal Court Theatre and The Guardian. Dyer had also directed Williams's play Kingston 14, staged at Theatre Royal Stratford East in 2014. The Death of England series marked Dyer as the first Black British artist to have worked at the National Theatre in three different capacities: as an actor (in the National's production of Ma Rainey's Black Bottom), a director, and a playwright.

Since the success of Death of England, Dyer has gone on to direct Get Up, Stand Up! The Bob Marley Musical at Lyric Theatre (2021-2023); Othello at the National Theatre (2022); Wretch 32: HOME, a theatrical performance of Wretch 32's album Home? on the National Theatre stage (2025); and One Flew Over the Cuckoo's Nest at the Old Vic (2026). He is believed to be the first Black director to work on a major stage production of Othello in the UK.

=== Appointments ===
Dyer was a longstanding trustee and associate artist at Theatre Royal Stratford East. In 2020, he was appointed as an Associate of the National Theatre. The following year, he was appointed by Rufus Norris as the National Theatre's Deputy Artistic Director, making him "arguably the most high-profile person of color in British theater". He remained in this position until January 2025, succeeded by Robert Hastie. In the same year, he was appointed as one of the Artistic Associates at the National Theatre, thus continuing his long association with the company.

== Personal life ==
Dyer has two children with his wife.

He has spoken openly about being dyslexic.

== Acting credits ==
=== Stage ===
Year	Title	Role	Venue(s)	Note/Refs
1990	Hanging the President, by Michele Celeste	Zwanini	Battersea Arts Centre	Replacing Adrian Lester in the original production
1993	It's a Great Big Shame, by Mike Leigh	Randall	Theatre Royal Stratford East	
1994	Skaville, by Paul Sirett	Eddie	Cockpit Theatre, Marylebone	
1997	Babycakes	Wilfred	Tron Theatre, Glasgow	
1997	Black Dove, by Robin Key	Ben	Red Lion Theatre	
2000	Sus, by Barrie Keeffe	Delroy	Greenwich Theatre	
2002	A Carpet, a Pony and a Monkey, by Mike Packer	Al	Bush Theatre	
2007	Big White Fog	Percy Mason	Almeida Theatre	
2010	Sus, by Barrie Keeffe	Delroy	Young Vic and UK Tour	
2014	Perseverance Drive, by Robin Soans	Josh	Bush Theatre	
2015	The Royale, by Marco Ramirez	Wynton	Bush Theatre	
2016	Ma Rainey's Black Bottom	Cutler	Lyttelton Theatre	
2017	The Kid Stays in the Picture	Marlon Brando	Royal Court Theatre	

=== Film ===
Year	Title	Role	Note/Refs
1999	Everybody Loves Sunshine	Leon	
2005	Cherps	Reggie	
2008	Fallout	Manny	
2010	Sus	Delroy	
2016	Mine	A local Berber	
2017	Acts of Vengeance	Shivers	
2019	November 1st	Carl	

=== Television ===
Year	Title	Role	Channel/Network	Note/Refs
1991	EastEnders	Marcus	BBC One	3 episodes
1992	Prime Suspect		Granada TV	Series 2 - Guest role, 1 episode
2001	'Orrible	Noel	BBC Two	
2009	Hope Springs	Marius Gruber	BBC One	5 episodes
2017	Black Mirror	Tony	Netflix	Series 4, Episode 5: "Metalhead" (main role)
2018	Death in Paradise	Leon Laroche	BBC One	Series 7, Episode 8
2024	Mr Loverman	Hubert	BBC One	3 episodes

== Writing and directing credits ==
=== Stage ===
Key
†	Denotes upcoming productions

Year	Title	Venue(s) / Production(s)	Role		Refs
Year	Title	Venue(s) / Production(s)	Director	Writer	Refs
2004-2005	The Big Life	Theatre Royal Stratford East (2004) and Apollo Theatre (2005)	Yes	No	
2011	The Westbridge, by Rachel De-lahay	Royal Court Theatre	Yes	No	
2014	Kingston 14, by Roy Williams	Theatre Royal Stratford East	Yes	No	
2019	The Happy Tragedy of Being Woke	Edinburgh International Festival	Co-director	Yes	
2020	Death of England: Michael	Dorfman Theatre	Yes	Co-writer	
2020-2021	Death of England: Delroy	Olivier Theatre	Yes	Co-writer	
2021-2023	Get Up, Stand Up! The Bob Marley Musical	Lyric Theatre, West End	Yes	No	
2022	Othello	Lyttelton Theatre	Yes	No	
2023	Death of England: Closing Time	Dorfman Theatre	Yes	Co-writer	
2024	Death of England (revival of all 3 plays)	@sohoplace	Yes	Co-writer	
2026	One Flew Over the Cuckoo's Nest	The Old Vic	Yes	No	
2026	The Story †	Olivier Theatre	Yes	No	
2026	American Buffalo †	TBA	Yes	No	

=== Films and television ===
Year	Title	Network/Channel	Role		Note/Refs
Year	Title	Network/Channel	Director	Writer	Note/Refs
2009	One of Us	—N/a	Yes	No	Short film
2014	Death of England	—N/a	Yes	No	Short film; part of Royal Court Theatre and The Guardian's Off the Page series
2019	Soon Gone: A Windrush Chronicle	BBC Four	No	Yes	Episode 3 - "Kev (1968)"
2021	Death of England: Face to Face	National Theatre At Home and Sky Arts	Yes	Co-writer	Television film

== Awards and nominations ==
Year	Award	Category	Work(s)	Result	Note/Refs
2011	Screen Nation Film and Television Awards	Male Performance in Film	Sus	Won	
2015	British Urban Film Festival Awards	Best Actor	Sus	Won	
2019	Alfred Fagon Award	Main award	Death of England: Michael	Longlisted	Then titled Death of England; joint nomination with Roy Williams
2020	Alfred Fagon Award	Main award	Death of England: Delroy	Shortlisted	Joint nomination with Roy Williams
2020	Black British Theatre Awards	Best Director for a Play or Musical	Death of England: Michael	Nominated	
2022	Visionary Honours	Play/Musical Of The Year	Death of England: Delroy	Won	Jointly won with Roy Williams
2022	Royal Television Society Programme Awards	Single Drama	Death of England: Face to Face	Nominated	
2022	BAFTA Television Awards	Best Single Drama	Death of England: Face to Face	Nominated	Joint nomination with Dixie Linder, David Sabel, Rufus Norris, Christine Schwarzman, and Roy Williams
2022	WhatsOnStage Awards	Best Direction	Get Up, Stand Up! The Bob Marley Musical	Nominated	

Cultural offices
Preceded by First incumbent	Deputy Artistic Director of the National Theatre; 2021-2025	Succeeded by Robert Hastie
