= Sus (film) =

2010 British drama film

- Directed by: Robert Heath
- Screenplay by: Barrie Keeffe
- Produced by: Clint Dyer; Robert Heath; Oliver James Ledwith; Robin Mahoney; Jono Smith
- Starring: Ralph Brown; Clint Dyer
- Cinematography: Jono Smith
- Edited by: Robin Mahoney
- Music by: Sally Herbert
- Distributed by: Independent
- Release date: 7 May 2010
- Running time: 91 minutes
- Country: United Kingdom
- Language: English

Sus is a 2010 British drama film directed by Robert Heath and starring Ralph Brown, Clint Dyer and Rafe Spall. It is set in a police station on the evening of the 1979 general election, where a black suspect is brought in and interrogated on suspicion of murder. It was written by Barrie Keeffe, adapted from his 1979 play with the same title, and takes its name from the sus law in operation at the time.

== Cast ==
- Ralph Brown - Karn
- Clint Dyer - Delroy
- Anjela Lauren Smith - Georgina
- Rafe Spall - Wilby

== Critical reception ==
Time Out wrote "overall this is a well structured, emotionally rigorous piece of filmmaking, and a timely reminder of the dangers of unchecked police power."
