= Nigel Lindsay =

British actor (born 1963)

- Born: 17 January 1969 (age 57); St John's Wood, London, England
- Occupation: Actor
- Years active: 1991–present

Nigel Lindsay (born 17 January 1969) is an English actor. He is best known on television for his roles as Sir Robert Peel in the first two seasons of Victoria, Jo Jo Marshall in the Netflix series Safe and as Barry in the BAFTA-winning Chris Morris film Four Lions for which he was nominated for Best British Comedy Performance in Film at the 2011 British Comedy Awards.

In 2012 he was nominated for an Olivier Award for his performance in the title role in the original West End run of Shrek the Musical at the Theatre Royal Drury Lane and won the Whatsonstage Award for Best Supporting Actor in the 2011 production of Arthur Miller's Broken Glass at the Tricycle Theatre.

== Early life and education ==
Lindsay was born in St John's Wood and grew up in North West London. He attended Merchant Taylors' School, Northwood, an independent private day school for boys before going on to the University of Birmingham, where he studied English and French. After university, he worked for three years as a financial analyst, specialising in French and Belgian equities at London stockbrokers Savory Milln and Swiss Bank Corporation (SBC). He gave up the city and won a place at bar school and drama school starting on the same day. He opted for the two-year drama course at the Webber Douglas Academy, where he won the Amherst Webber Scholarship. His finals show, in which he appeared as the eponymous Charley's Aunt, was directed by Michael Fry, who gave him his first professional job with the Lincolnshire touring company Great Eastern Stage.

== Career ==
Lindsay's early work was mainly in theatre. One of his first London stage roles saw him play the King of France in King Lear at the Royal Court Theatre, with Tom Wilkinson as Lear and Andy Serkis as the Fool. At a weekly Monday night poker game, Lindsay was asked by Patrick Marber to attend a week's improvisational workshop of a play he was devising about poker. This became Dealer's Choice, which premiered at the National Theatre in February 1995 with Lindsay as Mugsy and Ray Winstone and Phil Daniels among the original cast. The play transferred to the Vaudeville Theatre, and won that year's Evening Standard Award for Best Comedy and Writers' Guild Award for Best Play. Other theatre work includes: Max in The Real Thing by Tom Stoppard, which won three Tonys on Broadway in 2000; Ariel in the 2004 Olivier award-winning National Theatre production of Martin McDonagh's The Pillowman, with Jim Broadbent and David Tennant; twice as Nathan Detroit in Michael Grandage's Guys and Dolls at the Piccadilly Theatre in 2005 and again at the Phoenix Theatre in 2015, and Charlie Maggs in Sucker Punch, with Daniel Kaluuya at the Royal Court in 2010. Lindsay has appeared in five plays at the Almeida Theatre, including as Lenny in Harold Pinter's The Homecoming with Ken Cranham and Danny Dyer in 2009 and as Moe Axelrod alongside Stockard Channing and Jodie Whittaker in Awake and Sing by Clifford Odets, for which he was nominated for Best Supporting Actor in the 2008 Whatsonstage Awards.

Lindsay has appeared in many regular series, including: Unforgotten, Spooks, Silent Witness, Waking the Dead, Poirot, New Tricks and Inspector George Gently. He played Odo Stevens in the 1997 Channel 4 adaptation of A Dance to the Music of Time; Ewan McGregor's boss Ron Baker in the film Rogue Trader; the Jewish terrorist Levi in Rome; and Lt Col Mervyn Gonin in the BAFTA nominated The Relief of Belsen. He has worked with Steve Coogan on I'm Alan Partridge, Mid-Morning Matters with Alan Partridge, and Alan Partridge: Alpha Papa; with Armando Iannucci on The Armando Iannucci Shows; with Jennifer Saunders in two series of Jam and Jerusalem; and again with Chris Morris on Brass Eye. More recently he appeared as Tony Walsh in two series of the BBC comedy White Gold.

Later theatre work includes playing Bolingbroke opposite David Tennant in the RSC production of Richard II at Stratford and the Barbican; Jack McCracken in the National Theatre revival of the Alan Ayckbourn play A Small Family Business in the Olivier theatre; and Charlie Fox opposite Lindsay Lohan and Richard Schiff in David Mamet's Speed-the-Plow at the Playhouse Theatre in the West End. In 2021, Lindsay made his debut at Ireland's National Theatre, the Abbey Theatre, in Brian Friel's Faith Healer alongside Niamh Cusack and Aidan Gillen to great critical acclaim. In 2023 he appeared as Henry Lehman in a 17 week, sold out revival of The Lehman Trilogy at the Gillian Lynne Theatre in London's West End, directed by Sam Mendes.

== Theatre and filmography ==
=== Theatre ===
Year	Play	Role	Theatre	Notes
1991	The Girl Who Fell to Earth	Potoriek/Danilo	Lilian Baylis & tour	for Great Eastern Stage
1992	Anna Karenina	Stiva	Tricycle & tour	for Shared Experience, Time Out Award
1992	Relative Values	Lord Marshwood	Salisbury Playhouse	
1993	King Lear	King of France	Royal Court	dir: Max Stafford-Clark
1995	Dealer's Choice	Mugsy	Royal National Theatre /Vaudeville	Evening Standard, Writer's Guild Award
1995	The Tower	Landry	Almeida Theatre	dir: Howard Davies
1996	Blue Remembered Hills	John	Royal National Theatre	
1998	The London Cuckolds	Townly	Royal National Theatre	dir: Terry Johnson
1999	Morphic Resonance	Jim	Donmar Warehouse	
1999–2000	The Real Thing	Max	Donmar/Albery/Ethel Barrymore – Broadway	Tony Award – Best Revival
2002	Push Up	Frank	Royal Court	
2002	Bedroom Farce	Nick	Aldwych Theatre	
2003	The Tempest	Stephano	Old Vic	dir: Michael Grandage
2003	World Music	Geoff Fallon	Sheffield Crucible	dir: Josie Rourke
2003	The Pillowman	Ariel	Royal National Theatre	Laurence Olivier Award – Best Play
2004	Earthly Paradise	William Morris	Almeida Theatre	
2005	Woman Before	Frank	Royal Court	
2005	Romance	Defendant	Almeida Theatre	by David Mamet
2005	Guys and Dolls	Nathan Detroit	Piccadilly Theatre	
2007	Awake and Sing	Moe Axelrod	Almeida Theatre	Nom: Best Supporting Actor Whatsonstage.com Awards
2008	The Homecoming	Lenny	Almeida Theatre	dir: Michael Attenborough
2008	Under the Blue Sky	Robert	Duke of York's Theatre	
2010	Sucker Punch	Charlie Maggs	Royal Court	
2010	Broken Glass	Harry Hyman	Tricycle Theatre	Winner: Best Supporting Actor Whatsonstage.com Awards
2011	Shrek the Musical	Shrek	Theatre Royal Drury Lane	Nom: Best Actor in a Musical Laurence Olivier Award and Whatsonstage.com Awards
2013	The Same Deep Water as Me	Barry Patterson	Donmar Warehouse	dir: John Crowley
2013	Richard II	Bolingbroke	RSC Stratford/Barbican	dir: Greg Doran David Tennant as Richard
2014	A Small Family Business	Jack McCracken	Royal National Theatre	
2014	Speed the Plow	Charlie Fox	Playhouse Theatre	with Lindsay Lohan and Richard Schiff
2015	Bull	Carter	Young Vic	
2016	Guys and Dolls	Nathan Detroit	Phoenix Theatre	takeover from Richard Kind for 6-week run
2016	Harrogate	Him	Royal Court	for High Tide at Royal Court and tour
2018	God of Carnage	Michael	Theatre Royal Bath	
2021	Faith Healer	Teddy	Abbey Theatre	By Brian Friel; directed by Joe Dowling
2022	The Trials	Defendant One	Donmar Warehouse	Directed by Natalie Abrahami
2022	Woman in Mind	Gerald	Chichester Festival Theatre	
2023	The Lehman Trilogy	Henry Lehman	Gillian Lynne Theatre	Directed by Sam Mendes
2023	Farewell Mister Haffmann	Joseph Haffmann	Ustinov Theatre, Bath	
2024	An Enemy of the People	Morten Kiil	Duke of York's Theatre	Directed by Thomas Ostermeier
2024	Kiss Me Kate	Gangster	Barbican	Directed by Bartlett Sher
2025	Emma	Mr Woodhouse	Rose Theatre Kingston	Directed by Christopher Haydon
2026	High Society	Uncle Willie	Barbican Theatre, London	Directed by Rachel Kavanaugh
2027	The Popinjay Cavalier	Robespierre du Maurier	Phoenix Theatre, London	Directed by Quentin Tarantino

=== Television ===
Year	Title	Role	Notes
1992	Bye Bye Baby	Father	TV film written by Jack Rosenthal
1992	Between the Lines	Insp. Alan Grant	Episode: "Nothing to Declare"
1993	The Bill	PC Tyler	Episode: "The Right Man for the Job"
1994	A Few Short Journeys of the Heart	Drunk	Written by Andrew Davies
1995	The Bill	Peter Robinson	Episode: "Mitigating Circumstances"
1995–1998	Dressing for Breakfast	Dave	21 episodes
1997	Brass Eye	Various Roles	Written by Chris Morris
1997	A Dance to the Music of Time	Odo Stevens	2 episodes
1999	Déjà Vu	Tim	TV movie part of Channel 4 "Shockers" Season
2000	Harbour Lights	Charlie Badden	Episode: "A Quiet Storm"
2000	Too Much Sun	Dave Stamp	Directed by Mel Smith
2001	The Armando Iannucci Shows	Various	5 episodes
2002	I'm Alan Partridge	Bob Fraser	Episode: "Brave Alan"
2003	Midsomer Murders	DS James Noland	Episode: "Painted in Blood"
2003	Casualty	Jed Blackburn	Episode: "Never Judge a Book"
2003	My Family	Tube Driver/Roy	2 episodes inc. Christmas Special
2004	Murphy's Law	DC Gary Fender	Episode: "Bent Moon on the Rise"
2004	Frances Tuesday	Lambert	TV movie
2004	Tunnel of Love	Geoff	Written by Simon Nye
2005	The Bill	DS Pete Lancaster	Episode: "301"
2005	New Tricks	Alan	1 episode
2005	All About George	Mac	
2006–2008	Jam and Jerusalem	Marcus	9 episodes
2007	Rome	Levi	6 episodes
2007	The Gunfight at the OK Corral	Sheriff John Behan	Part 3 of the 3-part BBC Wild West series
2007	The Relief of Belsen	Mervyn Gonin	BAFTA winning Channel 4 TV Film
2009	Waking the Dead	Devlin	2 episodes; Substitute
2010	Silent Witness	DS Gus Rogerson	2 episodes; Intent
2010	Spooks	Jacob Chapman	Episode: 9.02
2011	Mid Morning Matters with Alan Partridge	Tommy Gaskell	Episode: "Tora Bora Alan"
2012	The Best of Men	Mr Heath	TV movie
2012	Inspector George Gently	DS Reece Statham	Episode: "Gently in the Cathedral"
2012	The Fear	Donny	Channel 4 series
2013	Gifted	Michael	Part of Sky Playhouse series
2013	Agatha Christie's Poirot	Francesco	Penultimate episode: "The Labours of Hercules"
2013	The Tunnel	Jonno	4 episodes
2015	Foyle's War	Clayton del Mar	Episode: "High Castle"
2015	You, Me and the Apocalypse	DS Frank Arden	Sky Atlantic/NBC Ep 1 directed by Michael Engler
2015	The Devil You Know	Dr Griggs	HBO pilot directed by Gus Van Sant
2016	Death in Paradise	Andy Hammond	Episode: "One for the Road"
2016	Victoria	Sir Robert Peel	16 episodes
2017	Unforgotten	Tony Kelsey	Series 2; 6 episodes
2017	White Gold	Tony Walsh "Walshy"	10 episodes
2018	Innocent	DCI William Beech	4 episodes
2018	Safe	JoJo Marshall	Netflix series; 7 episodes
2018	No Offence	DCI Terry Taylor	Series 3; 2 episodes
2018	Magnum P.I.	Ian Pryce	1 episode "Day of the Viper"
2019-2022	The Capture	DSI Tom Kendricks	15 episodes
2019	Plebs	Atlas	Episode: "The Vineyard"
2019	Tin Star	Clive	Episode: "Collateral"
2020	The Salisbury Poisonings	DCC Paul Mills	3 episodes
2020	The Last Kingdom	Rhodri	
2021	This Time with Alan Partridge	Tommy Gaskell	BBC
2022	The Chelsea Detective	Ricky Hopkinson	
2023	Kidnapped	Adrian Sington	BBC
2025	MobLand	Alan Rusby	Paramount+

=== Film ===
Year	Title	Role	Notes
1999	Rogue Trader	Ron Baker	
2001	Mike Bassett: England Manager	Mirror Journo	
2003	Blackball	Targitex chairman	
2005	On a Clear Day	Sharp Suit	
2006	Scoop	Strombel's Co-worker	Directed by Woody Allen
2010	Four Lions	Barry	Nominated for British Film Comedy Award
2010	First Night	Martin Mayes	
2012	The Date	Short Film	
2013	Alan Partridge: Alpha Papa	Jason Tresswell	
2013	Breakfast with Jonny Wilkinson	Nigel Maitland	
2013	Royal Shakespeare Company: Richard II	Bolingbroke	Live worldwide cinema screenings
2014	Captcha	Short Film	
2014	National Theatre: A Small Family Business	Jack McCracken	Live worldwide cinema screenings
2014	The Divorce	Short Film	
2017	Access All Areas	Mack	
2018	Dead In A Week (or your money back)	Brian	
2018	Six Minutes to Midnight	Mr Wheatley	

=== Radio ===
Year	Title	Role	Station	Notes
1995	Crossing the Equator	Jack	BBC World Service	
1997	People Like Us	Salesman	BBC Radio 4	Episode "The Photographer"
2001	Morphic Resonance	Jim	BBC World Service	
2002	Frederick and Augusta	Frederick	BBC	Woman's Hour Play
2003	The House of Milton Jones	Ian	BBC Radio 4	All six episodes Series One
2005	The Face of the Enemy	Jerome Angust	BBC	Book at Bedtime
2006	Lucky Numbers	Reading	BBC	PM
2007	A Pin to See the Peepshow	Harry	BBC	Play for Today
2008	The Far West	Reading	BBC	PM
2009	Number Ten	Lewis Smiley MP	BBC Radio 4	
2009	Alex Tripped on my Fairy	Mark	BBC	Play for Today
2012	The Great Animal Orchestra	Reading	BBC	Book of the Week
2012	Two Minute Hate	Barry	BBC Radio 4	Play
2012	A Canticle for Leibowitz	Book of the Week	BBC Radio 4	Extra
2012	On the Map	Reading	BBC Radio 4	Book of the Week
2013	The Reluctant Spy	Duncan Kavanagh	BBC 3	Part Series
2013	The Stranger's Will	Charlie	BBC Radio 3	Play
2015	The Hook	Louis	BBC Radio 4	Screenplay season written by Arthur Miller
2015	The Mermaid of Zennor	Jack	BBC Radio 4	
2016	Thunderball	Captain Clark	BBC Radio 4	
2018	The Proposal	Mike	BBC Radio 2	
2018	Jack and Millie	Harry	BBC Radio 4	Written by Jeremy Front
2018	The White Hotel	Victor	BBC Radio 4	Directed by Jon Amiel
2019	A Charles Paris Mystery: Star Trap	Chris Watt	BBC Radio 4	Written by Jeremy Front based on novel by Simon Brett
2022	Nuremberg: The trial of the Nazi War Criminals	Herman Goering	BBC Radio 4	Written and directed by Jonathan Myerson
