= Sucker Punch (play) =

2010 play by Roy Williams

- Original language: English
- Written by: Roy Williams
- Characters: 6 male, 1 female
- Genre: Drama

Premiere
- Date: 2010
- Place: Royal Court Theatre, London

Sucker Punch is a play by the award-winning British playwright Roy Williams. It was first staged in 2010 at the Royal Court Theatre in London. The play was nominated for the Evening Standard Award and the Olivier Award for Best New Play.

== Plot ==
Set in a run-down London boxing ring in the 1980s, two young black boys, Leon and Troy, are trained by a white trainer, Charlie, who had seen their potential. Troy soon rebels and is ejected from the gym by Charlie; he moves to the United States where he gains a boxing reputation. Charlie's daughter and Leon begin an affair, but when Charlie discovers this he objects at the idea of his daughter associating with a black man, forcing Leon to choose between training and his daughter. Leon leaves her and attempts to ingratiate himself with the white community to the fury of his family. Later, Troy returns with a fake American accent and a manipulative new manager; he and Leon are forced to fight.

== Characters and cast ==
Character	Royal Court Theatre	Washington DC	Chicago	West Hollywood	UK tour
Character	2010	2012	2015	2019	2023
Leon	Daniel Kaluuya	Sheldon Best	Maurice Demus	Rick K. Jackson	Shem Hamilton
Troy	Anthony Welsh	Emmanuel Brown	Denzel Love	Anthony Cloyd	Christian Alifoe
Tommy	Jason Maza	Lucas Beck	Walter Briggs	Brandon Ruiter	John Rogers
Charlie	Nigel Lindsay	Sean Gormley	John Judd	Rob Nagle	Liam Smith
Becky	Sarah Ridgeway	Dana Levanovsky	Taylor Blim	Mara Klein	Poppy Winter
Squid	Trevor Laird	Michael Rogers	Kenn E. Head	William Christopher Stephens	Wayne Rollins
Ray	Gary Beadle	Lance Coadie Williams	André Teamer	Gregor Manns	Ray Strasser-King

== Production history ==
=== Original run ===
The original production, staged in 2010 at the Royal Court's Jerwood Theatre Downstairs in London, was directed by Sacha Wares. It received positive reviews with particular attention drawn to the young star Daniel Kaluuya who won both the 2010 Critics Circle and Evening Standard Award for Outstanding Newcomer. The play also starred Anthony Welsh, Gary Beadle, Nigel Lindsay, Trevor Laird, Jason Maza and Sarah Ridgeway. The play's set, where the downstairs theatre was converted into a boxing ring, was designed by Miriam Buether who won the Evening Standard Award 2010 for Best Designer. Leon Baugh's choreography for the play won him the Olivier Award for Best Theatre Choreographer.

=== US productions (2012-2019) ===
Sucker Punch had its US premier at Studio Theater in Washington DC, with performances from 19 February to 8 April 2012. Three years later, the play was staged at Victory Gardens Theater in Chicago, running from 18 September to 18 October 2015. In 2019, the play was premiered in West Hollywood, California in a production by Coeurage Theatre Company, running from 4 to 23 June.

=== UK tour (2023) ===
A touring production of Sucker Punch took place in 2023, taking the play to nine regional theatres who were partner of the National Theatre. During the tour, the play was performed at:

- Queen's Theatre Hornchurch (30 March — 15 April 2023)
- New Wolsey Theatre, Ipswich (20 — 22 April 2023)
- Leicester Curve (25 — 29 April 2023)
- The Lowry, Salford (2 — 6 May 2023)
- Key Theatre, Peterborough (11 — 12 May 2023)
- Queen's Theatre, Barnstaple (18 — 20 May 2023)
- Theatre Royal Wakefield (23 — 27 May 2023)
- Cast Theatre, Doncaster (7 — 10 June 2023)
- Grand Theatre, Wolverhampton (13 — 17 June 2023)
- The Fire Station, Sunderland (21 — 24 June 2023)

== Accolades ==
Williams won the 2010 Alfred Fagon Award, his second, for the play.
