= Number 10 (upcoming TV series) =

British TV series

- Genre: Comedy-drama; Political drama
- Created by: Steven Moffat
- Written by: Steven Moffat
- Directed by: Ben Palmer
- Starring: Rafe Spall; Jenna Coleman; Katherine Kelly
- Country of origin: United Kingdom
- Original language: English
- No. of series: 1
- No. of episodes: 6

Production
- Executive producers: Steven Moffat; Sue Vertue
- Producers: Lawrence Till; Rachel Stone
- Running time: 48 minutes
- Production companies: Hartswood Films; ITV Studios

Original release
- Network: Channel 4

Number 10 is an upcoming British political comedy-drama television series, created and written by Steven Moffat.

== Premise ==
Described as "a workplace comedy-drama... in the most ridiculous workplace", the series focuses on the various inhabitants of 10 Downing Street and the incumbent British government, as they deal with various crises both political and personal. It is left deliberately ambiguous which party is in charge.

== Cast ==
- Rafe Spall as Harry Douglas, the Prime Minister of the United Kingdom
- Jenna Coleman as Katie Flynn, the Downing Street Deputy Chief of Staff
- Katherine Kelly as Frances Telford, the Downing Street Chief of Staff
- Akshay Khanna
- Abigail Lawrie
- Laura Haddock
- Jing Lusi
- Pierro Niel-Mee
- Rick Warden
- Joe Wilkinson
- Robyn Cara
- Richard Rankin
- Rhiannon Clements
- Patrick Baladi
- Shaun Prendergast
- Harry Baxendale
- Alex Macqueen
- Sid Sagar
- Sam Alexander
- Emer Kenny
- Gary Lamont

== Production ==
In 2023, writer Steven Moffat expressed interest in making a British version of the American political drama series The West Wing, in order to combat what he viewed as increasing cynicism in the way politics is viewed and discussed in the UK. In August 2025, such a series was officially confirmed, with the title and plot outline revealed, and Channel 4 unveiled as the programme's broadcaster. Ben Palmer will direct.

In December, the lead and supporting cast were announced, led by Rafe Spall, Jenna Coleman (who had previously worked with Moffat on Doctor Who), and Katherine Kelly (who had been a cast of member of Class in which Moffatt was executive producer).

Filming wrapped in March 2026, with the real Downing Street used as one of the shooting locations. Some of the scripts are based on real occurrences, with names and details changed.

== Release ==
Number 10 is expected to air in late 2026.
