= Roy Williams (playwright) =

English playwright (born 1968)

Roy Williams OBE FRSL
- Born: Roy Samuel Williams; 5 January 1968 (age 58); Fulham, London, England
- Education: Rose Bruford College
- Occupation: Playwright
- Writing career
- Genre: Drama
- Subjects: Racism; class; national identity and nationalism
- Notable works: Sucker Punch (2010); Death of England (2020-2023)
- Notable awards: Alfred Fagon Award; George Devine Award; Windham-Campbell Literature Prize

Roy Samuel Williams OBE FRSL (born 5 January 1968) is a British playwright and screenwriter. His plays have been staged in major theatres in the London, including the National Theatre, as well as in touring productions around the UK.

== Early life ==
Williams was born on 5 January 1968 in Fulham, London, and was brought up in Notting Hill. His parents had migrated to England from Jamaica as part of the Windrush generation. He was the youngest of four siblings and was brought up by his mother, a nurse and later a social worker, as a single parent after his father moved to the United States.

Williams was tutored by the writer Don Kinch, a friend of his sister's, when he was failing in school and attended some rehearsals in a Black theatrical company that Kinch ran. This experience has inspired his interest in working in theatre.

After leaving school at the age of 16, Williams did various jobs, including working in McDonald's and in a props warehouse.

== Career ==
=== Stage plays ===
Despite wanting to be a scriptwriter from a young age, Williams did not receive the support and encouragement to pursue this passion. Having been involved in youth theatre at Cockpit Theatre, Marylebone and Theatre Centre, he initially worked as an actor in addition to ushering before turning to playwriting. At the age of 25, he took a theatre-writing degree at Rose Bruford College and graduated in 1995 with First Class honours. He wrote The No Boys Cricket Club, his first full length play, as a final year student and the piece was produced at Theatre Royal Stratford East in 1996. He has since written plays for a number of major theatres in London, including Bush Theatre, Hampstead Theatre, Kiln Theatre, Lyric Hammersmith, Royal Court Theatre, and the National Theatre.

A breakthrough play in his early career was Starstruck, which won him the inaugural Alfred Fagon Award in 1997 before being staged at Tricycle Theatre (now Kiln Theatre) the following year. Another notable piece was Sing Yer Heart Out For The Lads, which premiered at the National Theatre in 2002 and has since seen a revival at the same venue in 2004, a UK tour in 2007-08, and two productions at Minerva Theatre, Chichester in 2019 and 2022. The play depicts racism and nationalism among England football fans and was described by critic Mark Lawson, in his five-star review of the 2019 production for the Guardian, as a "modern classic" that has not dated since its premier in 2002. The 2022 revival also received five stars from the Guardian's Anya Ryan, which praised that "Williams’s script is as hot today as ever".

Williams won the Alfred Fagon for the second time with Sucker Punch in 2010, sharing the award with Rachel De-lahay's SW11. Following its original run at Royal Court Theatre in 2010, starring the then up-and-coming Daniel Kaluuya, the play was also performed in the US, at Studio Theatre in Washington DC in 2012, at Chicago's Victory Gardens Theater in 2015, and at Tiger Boxing Gym in West Hollywood in 2019 in a production by Coeurage Theatre Company. Another play who has made it to the US was his adaptation of The Loneliness of the Long-Distance Runner, which toured the UK in 2012 before being picked up by the Off-Broadway Atlantic Theater in 2014. The New York production included cast members Zainab Jah, Jasmine Cephas Jones, Patrick Murney, Raviv Ullman, and Malik Yoba.

Williams and Clint Dyer co-authored the trilogy of plays under the title Death of England, which were individually premiered at the National Theatre between 2020 and 2023 and received critical acclaims. They were revived as a trio at @sohoplace in the West End in 2024. All productions were directed by Dyer, who had previously directed the 2014 short film Death of England (written solely by Williams for the Off the Page series by The Guardian and Royal Court Theatre) that formed the basis of the first instalment of the trilogy. The second instalment of the trilogy, Death of England: Delroy, earned Williams and Dyer the Visionary Honours Award for Play/Musical of the year in 2022.

=== Radio plays ===
In his final year of university, Williams wrote his first radio play Homeboys, which was broadcast in 1996 by the BBC after Williams was encouraged by his tutor to submit the piece to First Bites young writers' competition. Since then, he has written multiple radio plays for BBC Radio 3 as well as Radio 4. He was a regular writer to the BBC World Service series Westway (1997-2005). In addition to original stories, he has also written adaptations of works such as To Sir, With Love, The Midwich Cuckoos, Porgy, and The Great Gatsby. In 2025, he called for the BBC to reinstate the audio drama slot on Radio 3, after it had seen a 100% cut. "I hope they reverse that decision because drama is what it does best. We should really embrace that and take advantage of it", he said in an interview with The Stage.

=== Screenwriting ===
Williams has also written for films and televisions. He worked on the CBBC programme Scene: Offside, which won the Schools Drama category and earned Williams a nomination in the writer award in the British Academy Children's Awards in 2002. He wrote the televised adaptation of his own play Fallout, which aired on Channel 4 in 2008 and drew in 1.4 million viewers. He also co-wrote the script for the 2012 British film Fast Girls.

In 2019, he was one of the writers on the BBC Four series Soon Gone: A Windrush Chronicle, which was produced by Lenny Henry's Douglas Road production company and curated by Kwame Kwei-Armah, director of Young Vic Theatre.

In 2021, with Clint Dyer, he co-wrote the film Death of England: Face to Face, which was released on National Theatre At Home and broadcast on Sky Arts.

=== Academic appointments ===
Williams was a Royal Literary Fund Fellow based at Goldsmiths, University of London from 2023 to 2025. He was appointed as a visiting RSL fellow and visiting Professor of Playwriting at University of Greenwich in 2023.

== Artistry ==
=== Themes and subjects ===
Williams is known for writing about contemporary social issues, such as race, class, and national identity. He has said that race and masculinity (particularly the notion of toxic masculinity) are topics that matter to him as a writer. In 2020, he was one of six writers commissioned by Bush Theatre to contribute to The Protest series, aiming at exploring the impact of the murder of George Floyd on Black Britons. Williams wrote a short monologue entitled Black, which was performed by Aaron Pierre.

Many of Williams's works, from his very first play The No Boys Cricket Club (1996) to more recent works, The Fellowship (2022) and The Lonely Londoners (an adaptation of the novel of the same name, 2024), feature characters from the Windrush generation as he himself is a child of Windrush generation parents. Commenting on the Windrush scandal, he said that he would like to see "a sincere, honest full frontal, real, genuine apology, lovely apology" from the British government, as well as a stop to the deportations.

Sport also features heavily in Williams's plays, notably cricket in The No Boys Cricket Club (1996), boxing in Sucker Punch (2010), and football in Sing Yer Heart Out for the Lads (2002) and Death of England: Michael (2020). He explained in an interview in 2023 that "I just find sport to be an extremely useful metaphor to tell the things I want to tell".

=== Influences ===
Williams has cited August Wilson, Barrie Keeffe, and Winsome Pinnock among his influences.

=== Recognition ===
Williams was made an Officer of the Order of the British Empire in the 2008 Birthday Honours for his "services to Drama". In 2018, he was elected as a Fellow of the Royal Society of Literature. He won the Drama category of the Windham–Campbell Literature Prizes in 2025 alongside Matilda Feyiṣayọ Ibini. The nomination hailed Williams as not only "one of Britain's most significant playwrights" but also "one of its most prolific".

Williams is a fellow of Rose Bruford College, his alma mater. He received an honorary doctorate from Mountview Academy of Theatre Arts in 2014.

== Personal life ==
Williams is a supporter of Queens Park Rangers.

== Works ==
=== Stage plays ===
Year premiered	Title	Original venue	Transfers/Revivals	Note
1996	The No Boys Cricket Club	Theatre Royal Stratford East		
1998	Starstruck	Tricycle Theatre		
1999	Lift Off	Royal Court Theatre		
1999	Souls	Highbury Grove School	2000-2001: UK Tour	Published in the collection Theatre Centre: Plays for Young People (2003)
2000	Local Boy	Hampstead Theatre		
2000	The Gift	Tricycle Theatre		
2001	Clubland	Royal Court Theatre		
2002	Sing Yer Heart Out For The Lads	National Theatre	2004: National Theatre; 2007-2008: UK tour (Pilot Theatre production); 2019 and 2022: Minerva Theatre, Chichester	
2003	Fallout	Royal Court Theatre		
2005	Slow Time	Tour of London schools (January - April)		
2005	Little Sweet Thing	New Wolsey Theatre, Ipswich, Nottingham Playhouse, and UK tour		
2007	Joe Guy	Soho Theatre		
2007	Days of Significance	Swan Theatre, Stratford-upon-Avon	2008: Kiln Theatre; 2009: UK tour	Royal Shakespeare Company production
2007	Absolute Beginners	Lyric Theatre, Hammersmith		Adaptation of the novel of the same name by Colin MacInnes
2007	There's Only One Wayne Matthews	Polka Theatre	2010: Crucible Theatre, Sheffield; 2011: Southwark Playhouse and Beiing Fringe Festival (reworked as There's Only One Wayne Lee)	
2008	Angel House	New Wolsey Theatre, Ipswich and UK tour		
2008	Baby Girl	National Theatre		
2009	Category B	Kiln Theatre		Part of the Not Black and White series
2010	Sucker Punch	Royal Court Theatre	2012: Studio Theatre, Washington DC; 2015: Victory Gardens Theater, Chicago; 2019: Tiger Boxing Gym, West Hollywood, California; 2023: UK tour	
2011	The Suleman	Bush Theatre		Part of the Sixty-Six Books collection
2012	The Loneliness of the Long-Distance Runner	York Theatre Royal and UK tour (produced by Pilot Theatre)	2014: Atlantic Theater Company (Off-Broadway)	Adapted from the story of the same name by Alan Sillitoe
2013	Advice for the Young at Heart	Greenwich Theatre		Theatre Centre production
2014	Kingston 14	Theatre Royal Stratford East		
2014	Wildefire	Hampstead Theatre		
2014-15	Antigone	UK tour - opening at Derby Theatre and closing at Theatre Royal Stratford East		An adaptation of Sophocles' play
2016	Soul	Royal & Derngate and Hackney Empire		Based on the life of Marvin Gaye
2017	The Firm	Hampstead Theatre	2019: Hampstead Theatre	
2020	Death of England: Michael	Dorfman Theatre	2024: @sohoplace	Co-written with Clint Dyer
2020	Death of England: Delroy	Olivier Theatre	2024: @sohoplace	Co-written with Dyer
2021	Go, Girl	Lyric Theatre, Hammersmith		Part of the Out West collection
2021	Life Of Riley	Kiln Theatre		Part of the NW Trilogy
2022	The Fellowship	Hampstead Theatre		
2023	Unexpected Twist	Royal & Derngate Theatre Northampton and UK tour		Adapted from the novel of the same name by Michael Rosen
2023	Death of England: Closing Time	Dorfman Theatre	2024: @sohoplace	Co-written with Dyer
2024	The Lonely Londoners	Jermyn Street Theatre	2025: Kiln Theatre	Based on the novel of the same name by Sam Selvon

=== Radio and audio plays ===
Year(s)	Title	Network/Station	Note/Refs
1996	Homeboys	BBC Radio 4	
1997–2005	Westway	BBC World Service	Regular scriptwriter
2007	To Sir with Love	BBC Radio 4	Adaptation of the novel of the same name by E. R. Braithwaite
2009	Choice of Straws	BBC Radio 4	Adaptation of the novel of the same name by E. R. Braithwaite
2010	Vultures	BBC Radio 3	Recorded live at BBC 3's Free Thinking Festival
2012–2018	The Interrogation	BBC Radio 4	8 series
2016	Wrath	BBC Radio 4	Part of the Modern Morality Tales series
2017	The Midwich Cuckoos	BBC Radio 4	Adaptation of the novel of the same name by John Wyndham
2020	The Likes of Us	BBC Radio 3	
2020–present	Faith, Hope and Glory	BBC Radio 4	Co-writer
2021	History	Sound Stage at Pitlochry Festival	
2023	Bess Loves Porgy	BBC Radio 4	2-part adaptation of the novel Porgy by DuBose Heyward
2025	Gatsby in Harlem	BBC Radio 3	Adaptation of The Great Gatsby
2025	The Final Touch	BBC Radio 4	

=== Films and television ===
Year	Title	Channel/Network	Note/Refs
2001-2002	Babyfather	BBC Two	Series 2, episodes 5 and 6
2002	Scene: Offside	CBBC	
2008	Fallout	Channel 4	Television film; an adaptation of his 2003 play
2012	Fast Girls		
2019	Soon Gone: A Windrush Chronicle	BBC Four	Episode 6, "Malcolm and David (2000)" and episode 7, "Cyrus (2011)"
2021	Death of England: Face to Face	National Theatre At Home and Sky Arts	Television film
2026	Pierre	Channel 4	TV series

=== Published playtexts ===
Most of Williams's plays have been published individually by Methuen Drama, which have also published five compilations volumes:

- Roy Williams Plays 1 (2002, ISBN 9780413772091): Contains The No Boys Cricket Club; Starstruck; and Lift Off
- Roy Williams Plays 2 (2004, ISBN 9780413774262): Contains Sing Yer Heart Out for the Lads; Clubland; and The Gift
- Roy Williams Plays 3 (2008, ISBN 9781408101094): Contains Fallout; Slow Time; Days of Significance; and Absolute Beginners
- Roy Williams Plays 4 (2013, ISBN 9781472520692): Contains Sucker Punch; Category B; Joe Guy; Baby Girl; and There’s Only One Wayne Matthews
- Roy Williams Plays 5 (2022, ISBN 9781350289048): Contains Kingston 14; The Firm; Advice for the Young at Heart; Death of England; Death of England: Delroy

== Accolades ==
Year	Awards	Category	Nominated work(s)	Result	Note
1996	Writers Guild of Great Britain Awards	Best new writer of the year	The No Boys Cricket Club	Nominated	
1997	Alfred Fagon Award	Main award	Starstruck	Won	
1998/99	John Whiting Award		Starstruck	Won	
1999	Ethnic Multicultural Media Awards	Best theatre play	Starstruck	Won	
2000	George Devine Award		Lift Off	Won	Jointly won with Gary Mitchell, for The Force of Change.
2001	Evening Standard Theatre Awards	Charles Wintour award for most promising playwright	Clubland	Won	
2002	British Academy Children's Awards	Schools Drama	Scene: Offside	Won	Joint nomination with Sara Feilden and Rachel Tillotson.
2002	British Academy Children's Awards	Writer	Scene: Offside	Nominated	
2003	Evening Standard Theatre Awards	Best Play	Fallout	Nominated	
2004	South Bank Awards	Arts Council England Decibel Award for a black or Asian artist	Fallout	Won	
2009	Screen Nation Film and Television Awards	Achievement in screenwriting	Fallout	Won	
2010	Alfred Fagon Award	Main award	Sucker Punch	Won	Jointly won with Rachel De-lahay, for SW11.
2010	Evening Standard Theatre Awards	Best play	Sucker Punch	Nominated	
2011	Laurence Olivier Awards	Best New Play	Sucker Punch	Nominated	
2011	Writers Guild of Great Britain Awards	Best Theatre Play	Sucker Punch	Won	
2019	Alfred Fagon Award	Main award	Death of England	Longlisted	Joint nomination with Clint Dyer.
2020	Royal Television Society Programme Awards	Writer (Drama)	Soon Gone: A Windrush Chronicle	Nominated	
2020	Alfred Fagon Award	Main award	Death of England: Delroy	Shortlisted	Joint nomination with Dyer.
2021	BBC Audio Drama Awards	Best Original Single Drama	The Likes of Us	Commendation	
2022	Visionary Honours	Play/Musical of the Year	Death of England: Delroy	Won	Joint nomination with Dyer.
2022	Royal Television Society Programme Awards	Single Drama	Death of England: Face to Face	Nominated	Joint nomination with Dyer.
2022	BAFTA Television Awards	Best Single Drama	Death of England: Face to Face	Nominated	Joint nomination with Dyer, Dixie Linder, David Sabel, Rufus Norris, and Christine Schwarzman
2023	Broadcast Awards	Best Single Drama	Death of England: Face to Face	Shortlisted	
2024	BBC Audio Drama Awards	Best adaptation	Bess loves Porgy	Won	
2025	British Audio Awards	Best Audio Drama: Adaptation	Gatsby in Harlem	Won	
2026	BBC Audio Drama Awards	Best Adaptation	Gatsby in Harlem	Shortlisted	
2026	BBC Audio Drama Awards	Best Original Single Drama	The Final Touch	Shortlisted	
2026	BBC Audio Drama Awards	Outstanding Contribution	Faith, Hope and Glory	Won	Joint nomination with writers Winsome Pinnock, Rex Obano, and Carol Russell; producers Pat Cumper, Jessica Dromgoole and Mary Peate; and director Anthony Simpson-Pike
