= The Long Good Friday =

1980 British film directed by John Mackenzie

- Theatrical release poster
- Directed by: John Mackenzie
- Screenplay by: Barrie Keeffe
- Produced by: Barry Hanson
- Starring: Bob Hoskins; Helen Mirren; Dave King; Bryan Marshall; Derek Thompson; Eddie Constantine
- Cinematography: Phil Méheux
- Edited by: Mike Taylor
- Music by: Francis Monkman
- Production companies: Black Lion Films; Calendar Productions
- Distributed by: HandMade Films
- Release dates: 3 November 1980 (LFF); 29 March 1981 (United Kingdom)
- Running time: 114 minutes
- Country: United Kingdom
- Language: English
- Budget: £930,000 or £800,000
- Box office: £426,308 (UK)

The Long Good Friday is a 1980 British gangster film directed by John Mackenzie from a screenplay by Barrie Keeffe. Starring Bob Hoskins and Helen Mirren, the film, set in London, weaves together events and concerns of the late 1970s, including mid-level political and police corruption and IRA fund-raising. The supporting cast features Eddie Constantine, Dave King, Bryan Marshall, Derek Thompson, P. H. Moriarty, Paul Freeman and Pierce Brosnan in his film debut.

The film was completed in 1979, but because of delays, it did not have a general release until early 1981. It received overwhelmingly positive reviews from critics, and gave Hoskins his breakthrough – he was nominated for the BAFTA Award for Best Actor in a Leading Role and won an Evening Standard Film Award for his performance as gangster Harold Shand.

The Long Good Friday is recognised as an all-time cinema classic. It placed number 21 on the British Film Institute's Top 100 British films list, and Empire ranked it 19th on their list of the 100 best British films.

== Plot ==
London gangster's delivery man Colin arrives in Belfast with a suitcase of money, helping himself to some of the cash as he does, with the rest is delivered to three men who are soon ambushed. At a bar with his cab driver Phil, Colin picks up a young man and unwittingly avoids being captured by gunmen. Instead, Phil and the young man are abducted and killed, their bodies dumped on a country road.

Phil's body is returned to London, where his widow Carol spits on Jeff, the right-hand man to Harold Shand, a London firm gangster who aspires to become a legitimate businessman. Returning from a trip to the US, Harold is in business with corrupt Councillor Harris. While his enforcer Razors takes Harold's mother to church to mark Good Friday, Harold and his girlfriend Victoria hold a party on their boat by Tower Bridge, seeking to curry favour with city officials and impress visiting American businessmen Charlie and Tony with his concept for the redevelopment of the London Docklands.

At a swimming pool, Colin is lured to the showers by a young man, who stabs him to death with a fellow assassin. Waiting to collect Harold's mum, his driver is killed by a car bomb, while Harold gets off on the wrong foot with Charlie. Informed of the bombing, Harold is devastated to learn that Colin, his lifelong friend and accomplice, has also been killed. Another bomb has been discovered at Harold's casino but failed to detonate, and he summons Parky, a senior police officer on his payroll, to investigate.

Harold leaves Victoria to entertain the American investors after they narrowly avoid another explosion at one of his pubs. Harold and Razors torture Parky’s informer, Errol, to no avail, but soon ascertain that a pair of suspicious Irishmen visited the pub. Dining with Jeff, Harris, and the Americans, Victoria is forced to admit that Harold is under attack. The Americans give him one more day to resolve the conflict, but the evening is cut short by the drunk and boorish Harris, who accuses Jeff of being the 'real bastard'. Jeff escorts Victoria home, where she rejects his advances.

Harold's men round up gangsters from across London, interrogating them at an abattoir, as Jeff behaves strangely and nearly kills one of the captives. Parky informs Harold that the gangsters are not involved, as analysis of the bomb suggests the IRA are responsible. The explosives used were stolen from Harris's demolition firm, where a security guard has been attacked to ensure his silence, and Victoria warns Harold that he may have been betrayed by someone in his inner circle.

Harold finds Carol, who confirms that her husband was hired by Jeff without Harold's knowledge. Confronted by Harold aboard his boat, Jeff confesses that he sent Colin and Phil to Belfast to deliver money to the IRA on Harris's behalf. Three of the IRA's top men were then killed, leading the IRA to hold Harold's organisation responsible for selling them out to the security forces and Colin pocketing the missing cash. When Jeff declares that Harold is 'nothing' to the IRA, a furious Harold glasses him to death.

Victoria convinces Harold to gain control of the situation, burning his incriminating clothes as Harold showers off Jeff's blood. He forces Harris to arrange a meeting with the IRA's London chief at a stock car racetrack, where he has Harris and the IRA leadership gunned down. At the Savoy Hotel, Harold triumphantly informs Charlie and Tony, but they are preparing to leave, leading Harold to berate them and the Mafia he associates them with.

Leaving the hotel, Harold steps into his car, only to find it has been commandeered by IRA assassins, holding Victoria captive in another car. The assassin who killed Colin smirks as he trains his gun on Harold, who silently reflects on his predicament as he is driven away through London.

== Cast ==
- Bob Hoskins as Harold Shand
- Helen Mirren as Victoria
- Dave King as Parky
- Bryan Marshall as Councillor George Harris
- Derek Thompson as Jeff
- Eddie Constantine as Charlie
- Paul Freeman as Colin
- P. H. Moriarty as Razors
- Stephen Davies as Tony
- Brian Hall as Alan
- Alan Ford as Jack
- Paul Barber as Erroll
- Pauline Melville as Dora
- Patti Love as Carol
- Nigel Humphreys as Dave
- Karl Howman as David
- Gillian Taylforth as Sherry
- George Coulouris as Gus
- Trevor Laird as Jim
- Roy Alon as Captain Death
- Tony Rohr as O'Flaherty
- Pierce Brosnan and Daragh O'Malley as IRA men
- Leo Dolan as Phil
- Dexter Fletcher as Kid
- Kevin McNally as Irish youth
- Susie Silvey as Erroll's girlfriend (uncredited)

== Production ==
=== Development ===
Barrie Keeffe later said he wrote the film "on a whim" after looking at the movie section on a long weekend and not seeing any films he wanted to watch; he thought about what movie he would watch, and came up with an English gangster picture. Keeffe went out to dinner with Barry Hanson, who had produced a play of Keeffe's for television, and Hanson was enthusiastic about the idea of a British gangster movie.

A drive around the London Docklands inspired Keeffe to use that as a setting for his gangster hero, Harold Shand. The plot about American financiers was based on attempts by the Kray brothers to get the Mafia to invest in Britain. A visit to an Irish pub led to Keeffe coming up with the idea of the IRA clashing with a gangster.

The original title was The Paddy Factor. Hanson worked for Euston Films, a subsidiary of Thames Television. Euston did not make the film, but Hanson bought the rights for his own company, Calendar Films.

Hanson designed the film for the cinema and all contracts were negotiated under a film, not a TV, agreement, but the production was eventually financed by Black Lion, a subsidiary of Lew Grade's ITC Entertainment for transmission via Grade's ATV on the ITV network. The film was commissioned by Charles Denton, at the time both programme controller of ATV and managing director of Black Lion.

=== Casting ===
Although he wasn't a big star at that time, the role of Harold Shand was written with Bob Hoskins in mind. The role was Hoskins' breakout role and made him a star.

The film established Helen Mirren as a British film star.

The Long Good Friday was the film debut of Pierce Brosnan, then 25. It was also the final role of George Coulouris.

=== Filming locations ===
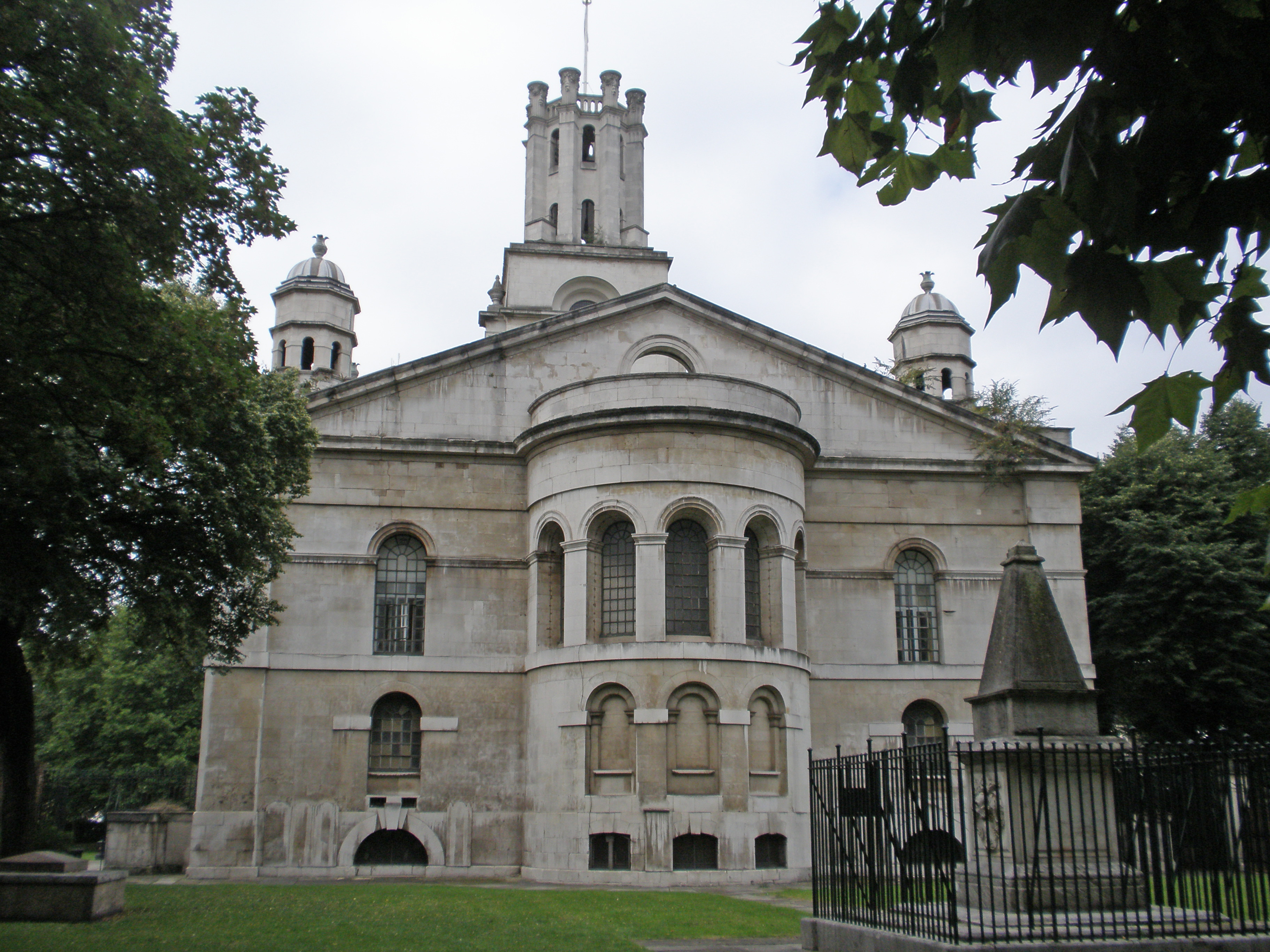
Exterior of St George in the East, featured prominently in the film.

- St Katharine Docks
- Civic Centre, Dagenham
- Isle of Dogs
- Heathrow Airport
- Paddington tube station
- Savoy Hotel
- Morden Swimming Baths, Morden, Surrey
- The Salisbury pub, Harringay
- Harringay Stadium
- St George in the East
- Ladywell Leisure Centre, Lewisham
- St Patrick's Catholic Church, Wapping
- Wandsworth Town Hall, Wandsworth
- No.1 London Wall (Note: The building was used in the scene when Harold and Victoria return to their flat. It was the offices of Orion Bank.)

== Reception ==
=== Release and box office ===
The film screened at the Cannes, Edinburgh and London Film Festivals in 1980. After Grade saw the finished film, he allegedly objected to what he saw as its glorification of the IRA. He was also concerned about the IRA attacking any cinemas where the film played.

The film was scheduled to be televised with heavy cuts on 24 March 1981. Because of the planned cuts, in late 1980, Hanson attempted to buy the film back from ITC to prevent ITV from screening the film. The cuts, he said, were "execrable" and yielded "about 75 minutes of film that was literal nonsense". Before the planned ITV transmission, George Harrison's company, HandMade Films, bought the rights to the film from ITC for around £200,000 less than the production costs. It gave the film a cinema release. (The company would later do this for another Mackenzie film, A Song of Freedom.)

According to Colin Dunn of Handmade Films, the film came close to breaking even on the British market, "but not close enough: you’ve really got to go some with this territory for a film to be viable."

=== Critical response ===
On Rotten Tomatoes, the film has an approval rating of 97% based on 31 reviews, with an average rating of 8.10/10. The website's critical consensus reads "Bob Hoskins commands a deviously sinister performance in The Long Good Friday—a gangster flick with ferocious intelligence, tight plotting, and razor-edged thrills." Roger Ebert gave a glowing review, calling it an 'amazing piece of work'. Leslie Halliwell stated: "Heavily melodramatic stylish updating of Scarface in a London East End setting. A critical success despite vicious detail and IRA plot involvement." Leonard Maltin wrote that the film "takes its rightful place with the best gangster movies of all time. Hoskins, brilliant as underworld entrepreneur, is matched by Mirren as subtly sexy mistress."

=== Awards and nominations ===
Award	Year	Category	Nominee	Result
British Academy Film Award	1982	Best Actor in a Leading Role	Bob Hoskins	Nominated
Edgar Award	1983	Best Motion Picture Screenplay	Barrie Keeffe	Won
Evening Standard British Film Award	1982	Best Actor	Bob Hoskins	Won
Los Angeles Film Critics Association Award	1982	Best Foreign Film	John Mackenzie	Nominated

=== Legacy ===
The Long Good Friday is regarded as a classic, and one of the best British films ever made. It was number 21 on the British Film Institute's list of the "BFI Top 100 British films" list. In 2010, The Guardian ranked it the 20th best crime film of all time. In 2016, Empire ranked The Long Good Friday 19th on its list of "The 100 Best British films".

== Unproduced sequel ==
Keeffe wrote a sequel, Black Easter Monday, set 20 years after the events of the first film. It opens with Shand escaping from the IRA after police pull his car over. Shand retires to Jamaica, then returns to stop the Yardies from taking over the East End. The film was never made. In one of his last interviews, Keeffe seemed unconcerned by that: "In some ways, I’m glad we didn't, because sequels are usually diminishing returns. To put it up there with Casablanca, no one wants Casablanca II."
