= Soho Theatre =

Theatre in Soho, London, England

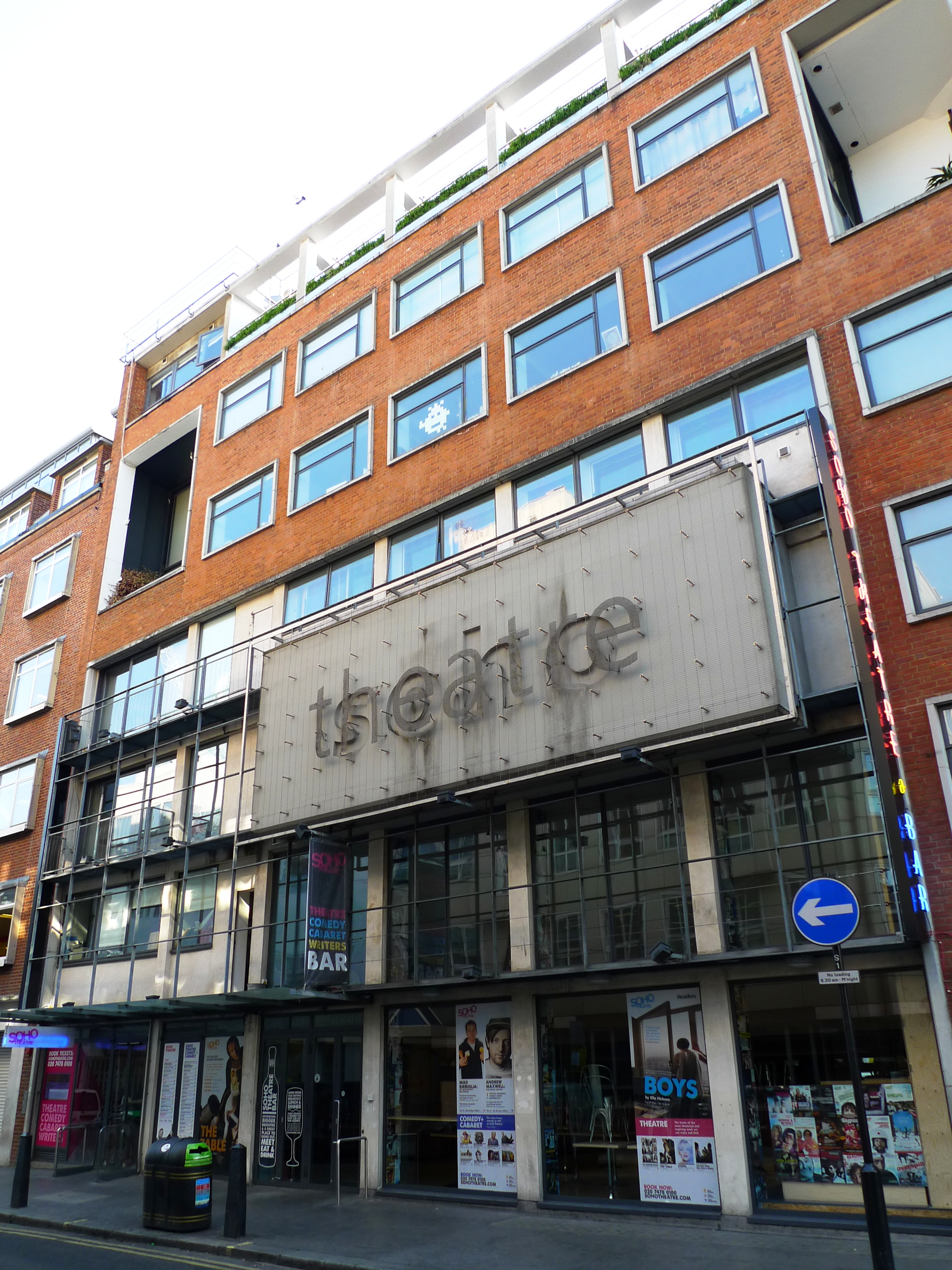
- Interactive map of Soho Theatre
- Address: Dean Street; London, W1; United Kingdom
- Coordinates: 51.5143°N 0.1330°W
- Owner: Soho Theatre Company Limited
- Capacity: 144–160
- Public transit: Tottenham Court Road

Construction
- Opened: 2000; 26 years ago

Website
- www.sohotheatre.com

Soho Theatre is a theatre and registered charity primarily based in the Soho district of the City of Westminster, with auxiliary facilities at Soho Theatre Walthamstow in north-east London. It produces and presents new works of theatre, together with comedy and cabaret, across three performance spaces.

The theatre has established itself as a vital launchpad for new artists and offers commissions, attachments and residencies for both emerging and established writers. It has launched the careers of numerous screenwriters and comedians in theatre, film, TV and radio.

The theatre's programme is a mix of comedy, cabaret and theatre, with a particular focus on new writing and alternative comedy.

== Soho Theatre Company ==
The Soho Theatre Company was formed in 1969 by Verity Bargate and Fred Proud, and initially performed at a venue in New Compton Street. Soon, the company moved to a small basement leased from the Soho Polytechnic, where it would remain for eighteen years. Sue Dunderdale was artistic director of the company for several years in the 1980s.

In 1990, the Soho Theatre Company left its original space, and produced works at the venues of the Royal Court Theatre, Riverside Studios, and the Institute of Contemporary Arts. From 1993 to 1995, it took up residence at the Cockpit Theatre in Marylebone. During this period it expanded its Writers' Development programme, and premiered the works of over 35 new writers.

In 1997, work began on a new venue for the Soho Theatre on Dean Street, after securing an £8 million Lottery grant and raising an additional £2.6 million in funds. In 2000, the building opened.

== Soho Theatre on Dean Street ==
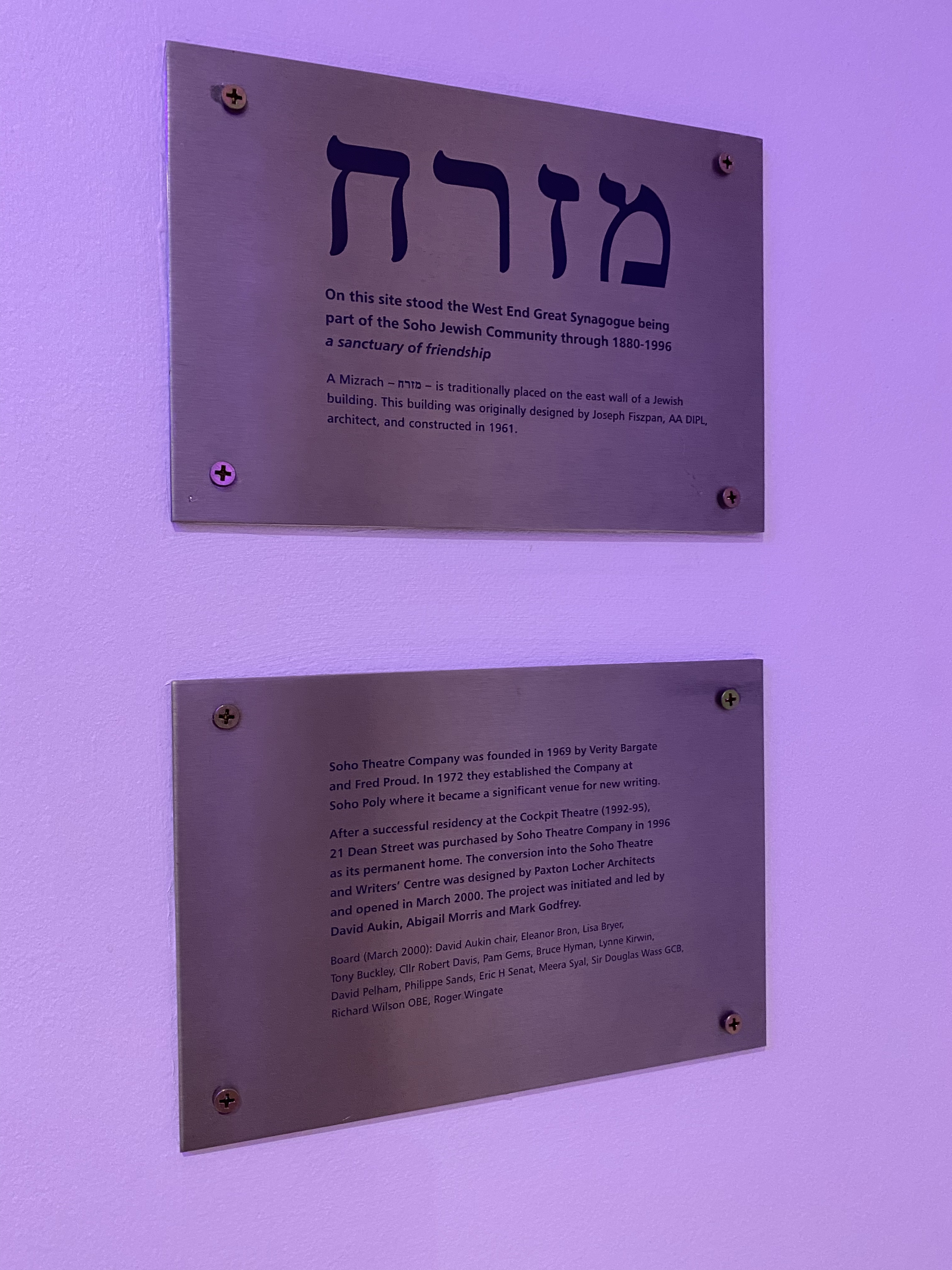
A mizrach in the Soho Theatre marking the former site of the West End Great Synagogue

In 2000, the theatre moved to its current home on Dean Street. The purpose-built venue houses the 165-seat Main House, the 90-seat Studio (upstairs), and the 140-seat Cabaret Space (downstairs). The ground and lower-ground floors are also occupied by the Soho Theatre Bar.

Its current executive director is Mark Godfrey and its creative director is David Luff. Following his 2018 appointment as creative director, Soho Theatre took a re-investment in commissioning and producing new plays, moving towards a producer-led playhouse model. Their creative team includes head of comedy, Steve Lock; associate directors Lakesha Arie-Angelo and Adam Brace; touring producer, Sarah Dodd and literary manager, Gillian Greer.

In 2014, the theatre was fined £20,000 for a health and safety incident in which a stage manager, Rachael Presdee, was paralysed in a fall through an unmarked balcony door on to the stage some three metres below. Compensation of £3.7 million was agreed with Presdee.

== Soho Theatre Walthamstow ==
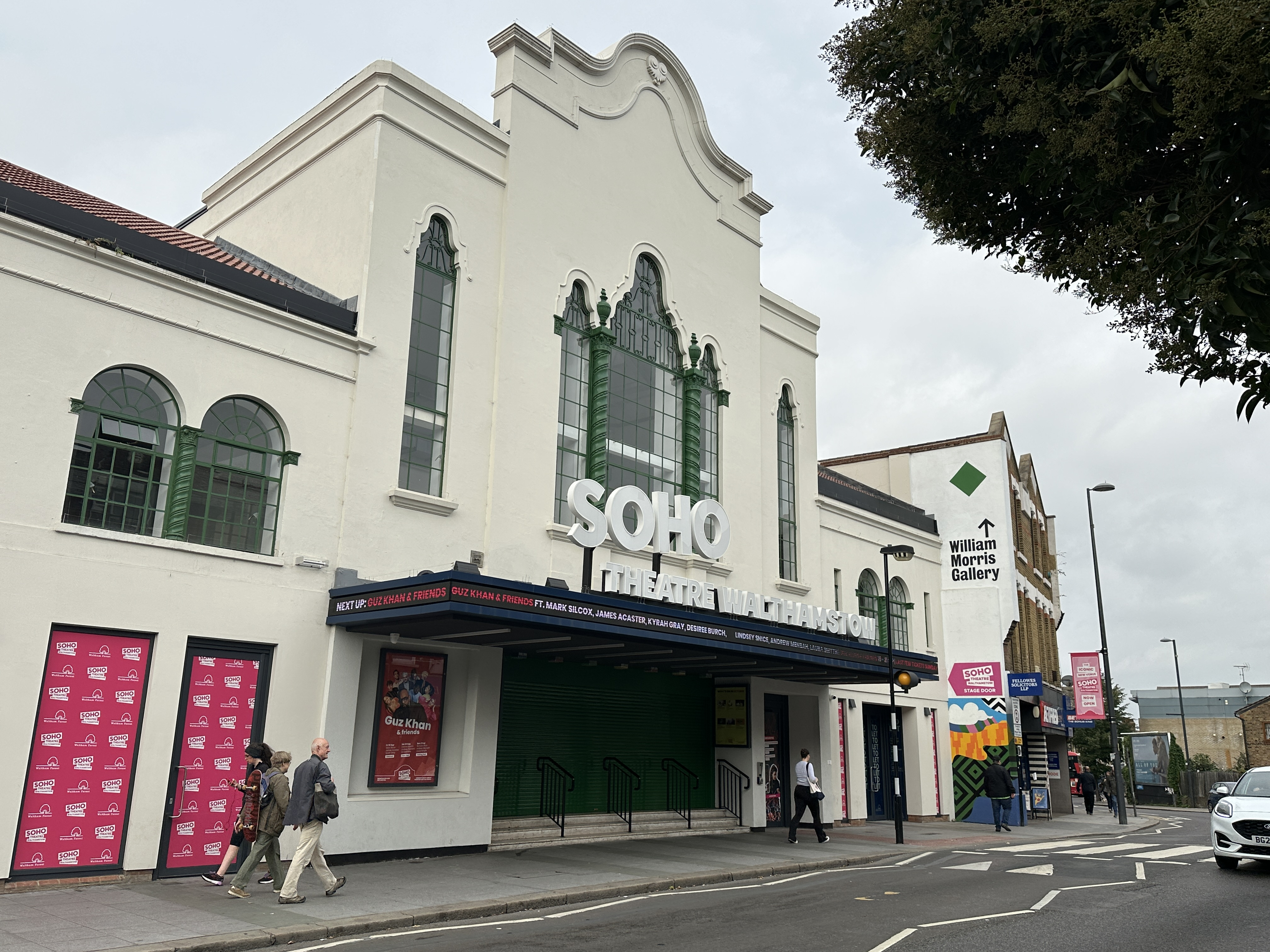
Soho Theatre Walthamstow in 2025, after extensive refurbishment.

In 2012, Soho Theatre, Walthamstow Forest Council and Waltham Forest Cinema Trust won a public enquiry securing the future of the Walthamstow Granada building as an entertainment venue. In 2019, the Council funds purchased the building with Soho Theatre announced as its operator.

After a £30 million redevelopment, the venue opened on 1 May 2025.

== The Verity Bargate Award ==
The Verity Bargate Award is Soho Theatre's new writing award with the winning play produced in a full production on their stages. The award was established in 1981–82 in memory of Verity Bargate, the founder and first artistic director of Soho Theatre. It has helped launch the careers of playwrights and screenwriters including Matt Charman (Bridge of Spies), Vicky Jones (Touch at Soho Theatre) and Toby Whithouse (Doctor Who).

The 2020 award is judged by a panel of industry experts including former Soho writers Phoebe Waller-Bridge, Arinzé Kene and Laura Wade, screenwriter Russell T Davies, actress and playwright Lolita Chakrabarti and Character 7's Stephen Garrett.

== Soho Six ==
The Soho Six is a playwright commissioning and development programme run by Soho Theatre. Each cohort consists of six artists selected to develop new work with support from Soho Theatre and partner organisations across the UK.

Cohort	Artists	Sources
2023/24	Miriam Battye; Safaa Benson-Effiom; Rhianna Ilube; Will Jackson; Karim Khan; Sam Ward	
2020/21	Willy Hudson; Yasmin Joseph; Nyla Levy; Racheal Ofori; Holly Robinson; Danusia Samal	
2019	Known participants (not exhaustive from sources located): Ifeyinwa Frederick; Iman Qureshi	

== Playwrights ==
=== Soho Poly period ===
- Howard Brenton
- Sue Townsend
- Hanif Kureishi
- Timberlake Wertenbaker
- Tony Marchant
- Pam Gems
- Karim Alrawi
- Barrie Keeffe
- Brian Clarke
- David Edgar
- Mary O'Malley
- Colin Spencer

=== Soho Theatre period ===
- Phoebe Waller-Bridge
- Philip Ridley
- Vicky Jones
- Phoebe Eclair-Powell
- Theresa Ikoko
- Gabriel Bissett-Smith
- Jennifer Kidwell & Scott R. Sheppard
- Arinzé Kene
- Jessie Cave
- Lucy McCormick
- Maddie Rice
- Sh!t Theatre
- Ryan Calais Cameron
- Dylan Coburn Gray
- Iman Qureshi
