= Fallout (2008 film) =

- Genre: Crime drama
- Created by: Roy Williams
- Directed by: Ian Rickson
- Starring: Lanre Malaolu; Aml Ameen; Charles Mnene; Gugu Mbatha-Raw; Lennie James; Nicholas Gleaves; Clare Holman
- Country of origin: United Kingdom
- Original language: English

Production
- Executive producer: Roy Williams
- Producers: Christine Healey; Matt Jones
- Production location: South London
- Running time: 90 minutes
- Production company: Company Pictures

Original release
- Network: Channel 4
- Release: 3 July 2008

Fallout is a one-off television film-length crime drama, broadcast on 3 July 2008, as part of Channel 4's Disarming Britain series. The drama explores the lives of a group of teenagers in South London, following the fatal stabbing of a mutual associate, Kwame Abena (Lanre Malaolu), and the subsequent investigation led by DS Joe Stephens (Lennie James).

== Cast ==
- Lanre Malaolu as Kwame Abena
- Aml Ameen as Dwayne Edmonds
- Charles Mnene as Emile Banis
- Lennie James as DS Joe Stephens
- Gugu Mbatha-Raw as Shanice Roberts
- Bunmi Mojekwu as Ronnie Kiffin
- Nicholas Gleaves as DS Matt Ryder
- Clare Holman as DCI Anna Kraney
- Jumayn Hunter as Perry McCalla
- Clint Dyer as Manny
- Noma Dumezweni as Joyce Abena
- Mark Powley as DC Steve Ferris
- Jamie Kenna as DC Alex Clarke

== Plot ==
Fallout begins with Kwame, playing basketball followed by him happily making his tragic journey home, on the phone to a girl. Just after telling this girl he loves her, Kwame notices a small gang, led by Dwayne (Aml Ameen). Kwame is quickly spotted by one of the gang members, Emile (Charles Mnene), and he and his fellow gang members stop him, while Emile searches him for any valuable goods.

Finding nothing of value, Emile lets him go, but another gang member, Perry (Jumayn Hunter), urges him to go after Kwame. Kwame runs through the local park, whilst frantically requesting help on his phone. The gang eventually catch up with him, and Emile stabs Kwame in the chest, after which he decides to steal Kwame's trainers.

The gang flees from the scene. A friend of the gang, Ronnie (Bunmi Mojekwu), witnesses Kwame's murder from across the road. She runs to the other side of road, to meet Kwame dying in a pool of his blood from his stab wound, begging for help. Shocked by what was in front of her, she ran away and left him to die. Kwame's death sets the pace for the rest of the film.

Ronnie runs to her best friend, Shanice (Gugu Mbatha-Raw), who is Emile's girlfriend, and works nearby in a fast-food restaurant and tells her what she saw. Shanice is seen placing flowers at the scene of the crime. The gang flee to a nearby river, and dump Kwame's trainers in the river, to do away with any evidence and Dwayne orders his gang to get rid of their clothes to eradicate any evidence.

Detective Sergeant Joe Stephens (Lennie James) stars as a former resident of the estate, assigned to this case alongside his partner, Matt (Nicholas Gleaves). It wasn't long before it became evident that the gang were responsible for the murder. Knowing that the perpetrator was one of the gang members, Joe set out to get to the bottom of the crime and began pursuing Shanice, with the motive that she had something to hide.

His pursuit of Shanice was noticed by the gang and he was given the name "white man's bitch" because his partner was white, and he wasn't reacting in the stereotypical manner that was expected from him, especially as he grew up in the very estate he was investigating. After a small disagreement with Dwayne over stolen money, Emile finds himself alone and disliked by the other gang members, as well as endangered as his accusation of ringleader Dwayne left Dwayne angered and intent on harming Emile.

Dwayne and Emile's disagreement leaves Shanice and Dwayne alone. Dwayne confesses his feelings for Shanice, and they share a kiss, which was spotted and interrupted by Emile. Dwayne threatened Emile with a gun, but Shanice convinced him not to shoot.

Although Joe's frustration often left him branded as the bad guy, his pursuit of Shanice had paid off, and she had confessed to Joe that Emile was responsible for the crime. But it was later revealed that Shanice only knew who killed Kwame, and not what happened. It was in fact Ronnie who witnessed the crime, and with full knowledge that the reward for catching and convicting the killer was £20,000, Ronnie decides to tell the police what she knows. When asked the colour of the trainers, she incorrectly said they were white, at which point Joe, forgetting his surroundings, corrected her by saying they were blue. This blew Joe's cover as it revealed he knew more about the case than he was letting on, and was fired shortly after.

When Emile emerged from his flat one night, he noticed that Perry, along with another member of the gang, Clinton (Jerome Holder), waiting for him armed with a large knife which he produced upon sight of Emile. Emile reacted by observing the height distance between the floor level he was on and the ground before jumping in an attempt to escape as Clinton flees the scene. Just as Perry is about to attack him, Emile runs into Joe and Perry flees the scene as well.

Joe, who was left heavily angered by his dismissal of the job that defied the stereotypes of unemployed black men, and violently began to beat Emile up. While he was doing so, he referred to a provoking judgement Emile made about him becoming "vexed" earlier in the film, to which, at the time, Joe responded "You will know when I'm Vexed". During Joe's attack of Emile, he informed him that this is the result of him being vexed. As Joe continued to beat up Emile, Shanice came in Emile's defence, but Joe was convinced Emile didn't feel any remorse. Joe eventually left Emile, very badly hurt.

In the final moments of the film, Shanice pays Kwame's mother a visit. She explained to Kwame's mum that she was responsible for Kwame's death. She told Kwame's mother that she tried to make a move on Kwame, and he denied her advances. To get back at him, she told her boyfriend, Emile, that it was the other way round, and that Kwame had been making unwanted advances.

Jealous Emile took out his anger on Kwame, which resulted in his death. Shanice then apologizes. Kwame's mother responds by saying, "The Lord will forgive you, which means I have to", and received her blessing. Emile was left disfigured and Shanice had a free conscience.

== Reception ==
The drama was critically well received by Gerard O'Donovan of The Telegraph, who stated, "Indeed for all its raw observation and subtle insight into the problem of youth violence, the one thing Fallout could never offer was anything in the way of a solution. True to its dramatic form, it offered resolution, or redemption of sorts, [but only] to one character."

== See also ==
- List of hood films
