= Michele Celeste =

Italian playwright

Michele Celeste is an Italian playwright. He moved to London in 1982, and has written plays in both English and Italian.

== Selected English-language scripts ==
- Riot Party - winner of the World Wildlife Fund/Young Vic Theatre International Playwriting Competition, London, 1982
- Obeah - winner of GLC-The Black Experience Film Competition, London, 1986; winner of a Special Commendation at the 1st Mobil Competition Royal Exchange Theatre Manchester, 1986
- Dogs! Sons of Dogs! - winner of the Verity Bargate Award, Soho Theatre Company, London, 1988
- Hanging the President - winner of the International Prize, 2nd Mobil Competition Royal Exchange Theatre Manchester, 1988; winner of a Fringe First award at the Edinburgh Festival, 1989
- Mariza's Story - winner of the WH Smith Plays for Children Award, West Yorkshire Playhouse, Leeds, 1992
- My Goat - finalist for the Verity Bargate Award, Soho Theatre Company, London, 1993

== Selected Italian-language scripts ==
- Madre Martire - winner of the First Prize, Premio Fondi La Pastora, Italy, 1998
- Opera Buffa! - joint winner of the First Prize, Premio Riccione Teatro Italy, 1999
- Nozze Bianche - winner of the Commission Prize, Premio Candoni-Arta Terme, Udine, Italy, 2001
