= Shoot the Messenger (film) =

2006 BBC television film

- Genre: Drama
- Written by: Sharon Foster
- Directed by: Ngozi Onwurah
- Starring: David Oyelowo; Nikki Amuka-Bird; Charles Mnene; Daniel Kaluuya
- Music by: Julian Nott
- Country of origin: United Kingdom
- Original language: English

Production
- Producers: Anne Pivcevic; Yvonne Isimeme Ibazebo
- Production company: BBC Films

Original release
- Network: BBC Two
- Release: 30 August 2006

Shoot the Messenger is a television play first broadcast on BBC Two on 30 August 2006.

== Synopsis ==
After reading a report that black pupils from inner city schools are being failed by the education system, IT consultant Joe (David Oyelowo) decides to become a teacher. Having secured himself a job at a school in South London, Joe uses a series of discriminatory methods to ensure black students are given extra tuition over their white contemporaries (targeting them for detention being one such method). When he is falsely accused of assaulting one of the pupils in his care (Charles Mnene), Joe is suspended from work pending an investigation. He appears on local radio where he defends himself against black rights activist Councillor Watts (Brian Bovell) who denounces Joe as "the embodiment of 21st century Britain [...] a Ku Klux Klanman with a black face". As a result of the broadcast, the community begins to turn against Joe and he loses his job. When he slips into a deep depression, Joe's marriage breaks up and he finds himself homeless.

Following these events, Joe begins exhibiting apparent racism towards other black people. He soon, however, finds himself being taken in by the members of a local gospel church. He observes black society as a detached onlooker at first, mocking the apparent cultural differences he perceives from the perspective of his new 'white' persona. Through the charity he receives he manages to find gainful employment as a handyman and meets Heather (Nikki Amuka-Bird) who helps in his eventual rehabilitation into black society. As the play reaches its conclusion Joe's innocence in the mistreatment of the pupil is revealed. Having rediscovered his heritage, Joe comes to the realisation that race and cultural identity are merely a state of mind.

== Style and themes ==
The play's title derives from the phrase shooting the messenger; it is told entirely from the perspective of the central character who frequently addresses the audience. His asides to camera do not serve a strict narrative function, but allow him to deliver his ruminations on black culture and society.
