= Barrie Keeffe =

English dramatist and screenwriter (1945–2019)

Barrie Colin Keeffe
- Born: 31 October 1945; London, England
- Died: 10 December 2019 (aged 74); London, England
- Education: East Ham Grammar School
- Spouse(s): Verity Bargate (d. 1981); Jacky Stoller (m. 2012)
- Children: Sam Proud (1971); Tom Proud (1973)
- Writing career
- Notable works: The Long Good Friday, Barbarians, Gimme Shelter, Sus
- Notable awards: Paris Critics Prix Revelations, Mystery Writers of America Edgar Allan Poe Award

Barrie Colin Keeffe (31 October 1945 – 10 December 2019) was an English dramatist and screenwriter. Best known for his screenplay for the gangster classic The Long Good Friday (1980), starring Bob Hoskins and Helen Mirren, Keeffe demonstrated an interest in a variety of social and political issues, including disaffected youth and criminality.

== Career ==
Born in London, Keeffe grew up in Forest Gate, in the east of the city, the son of Edward Keeffe, a telecommunications engineer, and his wife, Constance (née Marsh). His ancestors, the O'Keeffes, had arrived from County Cork in the mid-19th century. He had a sister, Sue. Keeffe was educated at East Ham Grammar School. During the holidays he acted with the National Youth Theatre.

From 1964 to 1975, he worked as a journalist with The Stratford Express (which closed in 2011). Some of his writing work, including The Long Good Friday, was inspired by stories he encountered as a journalist, and while drinking at the Two Puddings pub on Stratford Broadway.

He published his debut novel, The Gadabout, in 1969. His first television play, The Substitute, was produced in 1972, and his first theatre play, Only a Game, the following year. He became a full-time dramatic author in 1975.

He was writer-in-residence at the Shaw Theatre in 1977, resident playwright with the Royal Shakespeare Company in 1978, and associate writer at the Theatre Royal Stratford East from 1986 to 1991. During that period, Keeffe delivered "fifteen years of solid achievement at the top of his game". In 2007, he took the helm at the Collaldra Writers School and Retreat, Venice. In 2011, he became writer in residence at London's Kingston University.

Keeffe's plays have been produced in 26 countries, and his screenwriting credits include The Long Good Friday (1981) and Sus (2010), an adaptation of his 1979 play of the same name.

He was represented by The Agency, London.

== Themes and revivals ==
Keeffe's writing explores social and political issues, including unemployment, institutionalised racism in the police (Sus), and class (Gimme Shelter). Better Times focuses on the 1921 Poplar Rates Rebellion. In Barbarians, Keeffe strove to "capture the energy of punk".

Sus was revived at the Young Vic in 2009, and toured the UK in 2010. The Barbarians trilogy was revived in London in 2012 and 2015 by Tooting Arts Club, and at the Young Vic, also in 2015.

== Teaching and UN work ==
Keeffe taught dramatic writing at City University, London (2002–06), was Judith J. Wilson Fellow at Christ's College, Cambridge (2003–04), and a visiting lecturer and patron of Writing for Performance at Ruskin College, Oxford (2003–04). In 1995, the United Nations' fiftieth anniversary, he served as a United Nations Ambassador.

== Honours and awards ==
In 1978, Keeffe received the Paris Critics Prix Revelations, and the Mystery Writers of America Edgar Allan Poe Award in 1982. In 2010, he was made an Honorary Doctor of Letters at Warwick University.

== Personal life and death ==
Keefe was married four times. His first marriage was to Dee Truman, a social worker, from 1969 until their divorce 10 years later. His second marriage was to the novelist and theatre director Verity Bargate, who died in 1981. After her death, Keeffe was guardian to her two sons, whom he brought up. His third marriage was to Julia Lindsay, a pop music agent, from 1983 until their divorce in 1993. In 2012, he married the film and television producer Jacky Stoller.

Keeffe died on 10 December 2019, following a brief undisclosed illness. He was 74.

== Works ==
=== Theatre plays ===
- Only a Game (1973)
- A Sight of Glory (1975)
- Scribes (1975)
- Here Comes the Sun (1976)
- Gimme Shelter (1977)
- A Mad World My Masters (1977, 1984)
- Barbarians, a trilogy consisting of Killing Time, Abide with Me and In the City (1977)
- Frozen Assets (1978)
- Sus (1979)
- Bastard Angel (1980)
- She's So Modern (1980)
- Black Lear (1980)
- Chorus Girls (1981)
- Better Times (1985)
- King of England (1988)
- My Girl (1989)
- Not Fade Away (1990)
- Wild Justice (1990)
- I Only Want to Be With You (1995)
- The Long Good Friday (1997)
- Shadows on the Sun (2001)
- Still Killing Time (2006)

=== Film and TV ===
- Substitute (1972)
- Not Quite Cricket (1977)
- Gotcha (1977)
- Nipper (1977)
- Champions (1978)
- Hanging Around (1978)
- Waterloo Sunset (1979)
- King (1984)

=== Television series ===
- No Excuses (1983)

=== Radio plays ===
- Uncle Jack (1975)
- Pigeon Skyline (1976)
- Only a Game (1976)
- Heaven Scent (1979) (Won a Giles Cooper Award for 1979)
- Anything Known (1980)
- Frozen Assets (1987)
- Paradise (1989)
- My Girl (1992)
- On the Eve of the Millennium (1999)
- Feng Shui and Me (2001)
- The Five of Us (2002)

=== Film ===
- The Long Good Friday (1981)
- Sus (2010)

=== Novels ===
- Gadabout (1969)
- No Excuses (1983)

=== Theatre adaptations and direction ===
- A Certain Vincent (1975)
- A Gentle Spirit (1981)
