= British Urban Film Festival =

Film festival for urban independent cinema

- The official logo for the British Urban Film Festival
- Established: Formed in July 2005
- Headquarters: Greater London, England
- Senior executive: Emmanuel Anyiam-Osigwe
- Website: www.britishurbanfilmfestival.co.uk

The British Urban Film Festival (BUFF) was formed in July 2005 to showcase urban independent cinema in the absence of any such state-sponsored activity in the UK.

Supported by filmmakers and British actors, the organisation was set up by Emmanuel Anyiam-Osigwe and established as BUFF Enterprises Ltd.

== History ==
=== 2005–2013 ===
BUFF bears no relation to the BUFF International Film Festival established in 1984 in Malmö, Sweden. The London-based organization was initially created in partnership with organizations like The Screen.Biz (UK) and The Hip-Hop Association (US) to mobilize and develop young, up-and-coming homegrown British urban talent in the independent film and TV sector. With offices in Greater London, the company has also devised projects including The Search for BUFF, a reality-TV-talent contest designed to find people who 'look buff' who are then 'appointed' as ambassadors to promote the annual British Urban Film Festival. Filmed on location across the UK, the pilot was screened at the headquarters of ITV in London's South Bank and made its Christmas Day broadcast debut on BEN Television in December 2005. The first series aired from January–April 2006. The second series also aired on BEN Television from May to August 2007 in addition to the annual staging of the British Urban Film Festival, a unique event as it is the only one of its kind in the UK which is free to attend by the general public. Although the annual festival is free to attend, it does charge entry fees to filmmakers who wish to submit their films in what is, according to Film London, "an important and emerging genre which is not otherwise seen regularly in the capital's cinemas". The Genesis Cinema in Whitechapel and The Oxford House in Bethnal Green are venues in London's East End forming part of the 2008 festival. The Stratford Picturehouse Cinema in Newham forms part of the 2009 festival which is being supported by 3 London boroughs: Newham, Tower Hamlets and Redbridge. The 2009 festival is also notable for its screening of Disoriented Generation, a privately financed UK independent film co-produced by and starring actor Wil Johnson (who also appears in the short film Colour Blind also premiering at the festival).

The 2010 festival marked BUFF's 5th anniversary with the screening of Sus, based on the original stageplay written by Barrie Keeffe and starring Clint Dyer (who also co-produced the movie), Rafe Spall (who went onto star in the BBC 2 drama series The Shadow Line), Ralph Brown (Withnail and I, Huge) and Anjela Lauren Smith (Babymother, 24 Hours in London). Other high-profile screenings included rare video footage of N-Dubz in 'The Way We Were' and 'Bad Day', starring Claire Goose, Robbie Gee and Sarah Harding.

The 2011 festival was headlined by the UK premiere of David is Dying at London's Trades Union Congress headquarters and stars Lonyo Engele, a former UK garage music artist in his debut acting role.

April 2012 marked the festival's return to television for the first time in five years with the launch of "BUFF Presents..." a strand of films previously screened at the British Urban Film Festival including Drink, Drugs, & KFC.

October 12, 2012, marked the return of the British Urban Film Festival at London's Trades Union Congress headquarters and was presented by actor Wil Johnson. The two-day event (which was free to attend) also hosted a 12-hour marathon of short films, documentaries, feature-length dramas plus Q&A sessions on October 13 at Oxford House in Bethnal Green.

January 2013 marked another milestone when BUFF became the first film festival in the UK to screen a sample of its festival selections via the BBC iPlayer platform in conjunction with Community Channel.

March 2013 marked the launch of the inaugural BUFF Spring Season. The concept brought together an array of film programming "online, on-air and in person" in conjunction with ITV, Grime Daily, Genesis Cinema and The British Blacklist.com.

On 2 May 2013, it was announced that the publisher-broadcaster Channel 4 would be hosting the opening three events of the 8th annual British Urban Film Festival at the company's headquarters in Horseferry Road, Central London. In addition, the festival (5–9 September) was to be headlined by the UK premiere screenings of Calloused Hands starring Andre Royo from the HBO series The Wire, Traveller starring David Essex OBE, Jason Maza and Lois Winstone, and the award-winning Bloody Lip written and directed by Adriel Leff. Coverage was hosted from Odeon West End in Leicester Square by actress Zawe Ashton (Dreams of a Life/Fresh Meat). Actor Riz Ahmed (The Reluctant Fundamentalist/Four Lions/Ill Manors/Shifty) was among the official festival ambassadors. On 25 December 2013, it was announced that Channel 4 will be hosting the opening 3 events of the 9th annual British Urban Film Festival in September 2014, ensuring that they "continue to seek out the very best creative voices. Voices that represent the diversity and cultural richness of contemporary British life.

2013 featured the inaugural BUFF screenplay competition. The three recipients were Jeff Nottingham for Lost in Mozart, Yvonne Ossei for Face Up, and Donna Marie Dowelled for The Office. There were live performances of all three winning screenplays at the Channel 4 headquarters at the end of the first day of the festival. The event was introduced by actress Shereen Miranda."

=== 2014 ===
On 7 July 2014, it was announced that "The Trials of Muhammad Ali" was to premiere in the UK as part of the 2014 British Urban Film Festival. Two gala screenings were scheduled to take place at the Prince Charles Cinema in Leicester Square (4 September) and the Genesis Cinema in Whitechapel (7 September). It was also announced that the Sky Sports boxing pundit Spencer Fearon was to present the opening night gala in London's West End. On 13 August 2014, it was announced that BUFF would screen two film festival selections for the first time on network television with the terrestrial premieres of "Driftwood" & "Sunny Boy" on Channel 4 as part of the Shooting Gallery short film strand. Overnight figures (released on 26 August 2014) revealed that 120,000 viewers tuned in to the 25 August broadcast.

On 21 November 2014, the inaugural BUFF Africa Season was officially launched at the headquarters of The Africa Channel International in Central London where it was announced that BUFF will screen the world premiere of "Mum, Dad meet Sam" at the Genesis Cinema in Whitechapel on Saturday 6 December.

=== 2015 ===
On 26 January 2015, it was announced that the BAFTA award-winning producer Damian Jones was appointed to the board of the British Urban Film Festival. On 2 March 2015, it was announced that the award-winning writers of Run Daniel Fajemisin-Duncan and Marlon Smith were appointed as script judges for the British Urban Film Festival. On 1 April 2015, it was announced that the first ever British Urban Film Festival awards (supported by Channel 4) will take place in London on Thursday 17 September. On 5 June 2015, it was announced that the award-winning film and TV producer Charlie Hanson was the latest industry figure appointed as a patron to the board of the British Urban Film Festival. On 21 August 2015, London Live will begin screening films previously shown by the British Urban Film Festival in a 2-year broadcast deal.

As part of the festival's 10th anniversary in September 2015, Abrantee Boateng Capital Xtra & Larushka Ivan-Zadeh Metro will be hosting BUFF's first ever awards ceremony at the Cinema Museum (London). The 2015 British Urban Film Festival will also screen 4 UK premieres at the Genesis Cinema in Whitechapel including "That Daughter's Crazy" starring Rain Pryor, "Lapse of Honour" starring Lady Leshurr, Louis Emerick and Gary McDonald, Brash Young Turks starring Julian Glover and "Invisible Men" starring Abrantee Boateng. On 8 October 2015, the festival announced the addition of 2 script judges and 8 new BUFF patrons including the BAFTA award-winning actor Adam Deacon, Femi Oyeniran and director Mo Ali.

=== 2016 ===
On 27 January 2016, highlights of the British Urban Film Festival awards were broadcast on Sky (United Kingdom) and Freeview via Showcase TV. On 18 April 2016, the festival announced the appointment of Adeyinka Akinrinade as its new festival director succeeding Emmanuel Anyiam-Osigwe who was the festival director from 2005–2015. On 25 April 2016, it was announced that the 2016 British Urban Film Festival will be hosted at Odeon Cinemas in Camden Town and Swiss Cottage from 14 to 20 September. On 9 May 2016, it was announced that actor Wil Johnson is to receive the highest honour at the 2016 British Urban Film Festival Awards on Sunday 18 September.

On 10 May 2016, it was announced that London Live will continue to screen films c/o the British Urban Film Festival free-to-air until 2018. On 16 May 2016, it was announced that Adam Deacon & Femi Oyeniran are to host the 2016 British Urban Film Festival Awards from Hilton Hotel Tower Bridge. It was also announced that Heather Small former lead singer of M People is to be the headline act. On 30 May 2016, the British Urban Film Festival came top of a global list of diverse film festivals worthy of attending in 2016. The festival came ahead of 4 American film festivals and was published on the website of Metro (British newspaper).

On 7 June 2016, it was announced that Colourful Radio signed an exclusive deal to provide live outside broadcasts of the BUFF 2016 press conference and Script Reading competition from Channel 4 headquarters. On 4 July 2016, it was announced that To Dream is to open the 2016 British Urban Film Festival at the Odeon Cinemas in Camden Town. The film stars Ed Hayter, Freddie Thorp, Diana Vickers and Adam Deacon. On 14 July 2016, it was announced that BBC Films is to sponsor the BUFF Awards 2016 (in the "best emerging talent" category), the showpiece event in its annual British Urban Film Festival.

On 21 July 2016, it was announced that 'Residential', a London-based Yardie drama is to close the 2016 British Urban Film Festival at the Odeon Cinemas in Swiss Cottage. Former BBC Radio 1 disc jockey Chris Goldfinger is amongst the movie's producers. On 8 September 2016, it was announced that Trace Urban is to sponsor the BUFF Awards 2016 in the "best movie" category. It was also announced that Ghanaian hip hop star Fuse ODG is to attend the ceremony along with Trace CEO Olivier Laouchez to present the "best movie" award. On 7 November 2016, the festival announced the appointment of 4 new BUFF patrons and one new BUFF script judge. The line-up includes actors Arnold Oceng & Wil Johnson, award-winning director Jesse Quinones, award-winning producer Cass Pennant and producer/screenwriter Michelle Blake.

=== 2017 ===
On 26 May 2017, the festival announced that telecommunications giant BT was to sponsor the 2017 British Urban Film Festival and Awards. The sponsorship also gives BT rights to share the broadcast of the BUFF Awards on BT.com, exclusive rights to host both events at BT Tower and the opportunity to screen films acquired from BUFF on the BT TV store platform.

It was also announced that the movie Free in Deed starring David Harewood is to open the BT British Urban Film Festival (6–12 September) at BT Tower on Wednesday 6 September. On 25 September 2017, it was announced that the British Urban Film Festival is to curate six short films (previously shown at BUFF) to be screened at the BAFTA-qualifying ASFF Aesthetica Short Film Festival in November. ASFF is showcased annually in York and marks the 3rd time in 4 years that BUFF has been invited to take part in the event as a festival partner. On 30 October 2017, it was announced that the British Urban Film Festival is to attend DBUFF (Da Bounce Urban Film Festival) for the first time in November. DBUFF is showcased annually in Amsterdam and is the Netherlands' premier urban film festival.

=== 2018 ===
On 4 January 2018, it was announced that the 2018 British Urban Film Festival was to take place in the summer for the first time in its history with the BUFF Awards opening the six-day event on Monday 4 June. The festival was to run 5–9 June. On 8 January 2018, Robert Nisbet (journalist) (from Sky News) interviewed Emmanuel Anyiam-Osigwe (founder of the British Urban Film Festival) to discuss the Golden Globes, Oprah Winfrey's "Time's up" speech, Mudbound and issues about diversity. On 6 February 2018, the BAFTA-recognised Aesthetica Short Film Festival announced that Emmanuel Anyiam-Osigwe (founder of the British Urban Film Festival) had been appointed to its jury panel.

On 8 February 2018, Emmanuel Anyiam-Osigwe introduced exclusive live coverage of the European premiere of Black Panther on Colourful Radio. Airing as part of the Colourful Drivetime show with Julie-Ann Ryan, the broadcast featured interviews on the black carpet with Isaac Tomiczek and Jo Eluka (from "Meet The Critics"), Joel Campbell (From "The Voice" newspaper) executive producer of Black Panther Nate Moore, Femi Oguns (agent to Letitia Wright) and leading cast members including Michael B Jordan, Letitia Wright, Andy Serkis and Lupita Nyong'o. On 28 February 2018, it was announced that the British Urban Film Festival is to release its first UK feature film on 5 June. Produced by Emmanuel Anyiam-Osigwe and directed by Clare Anyiam-Osigwe, "No Shade" is told through the prism of love, relationships, dating and marriage and provides a raw perspective on the issue of colourism and what happens when looking for love in the right place, goes wrong.

The film stars Adele Oni, Kadeem Pearse, Clare Anyiam-Osigwe, Algie Salmon-Fattahian, Sharea Samuels and Jade Asha. Also starring are Fred Lancaster, Lonyo Engele, Paula Masterton, Veronica Jean Trickett, Joel Grizzle, Chris Preddie OBE, Tenisha White, Zephryn Taitte, Justin Chinyere, Kele Le Roc and Judith Jacob. "No Shade" will open the 2018 British Urban Film Festival with a UK premiere screening at the Rio cinema in Dalston on 5 June. On 8 March 2018, the festival announced that director Amma Asante is to be honoured at the BUFF Awards in recognition for her film work as director of A United Kingdom (screened by the festival in October 2016) and also for her previous films Belle (produced by BUFF patron Damian Jones) and A Way of Life (produced by BUFF patron Charlie Hanson).

Asante will be the first female recipient of the award and the fourth individual to receive the honour following Ashley Walters last year, Wil Johnson in 2016 and Richard Pryor (posthumously) in 2015.

It was also announced that the movie Two Graves is to close the 2018 British Urban Film Festival at London's Curzon Soho on 9 June. The film marks the directorial debut of writer Gary Young (who also wrote Harry Brown) and stars Cathy Tyson, Katie Jarvis, Dave Johns, Josh Herdman, David Hayman, Kedar Williams-Stirling, Danielle Harold, Neal Ward, Shantelle Rochester-Henry (who also serves as producer) and Vas Blackwood.

On 6 September, it was revealed that BUFF Originals – the production arm of the British Urban Film Festival – announced the streaming release of No Shade in HD on the Vimeo OTT platform and FilmDoo.

On 23 October, it was announced that No Shade secured a UK theatrical release in Odeon Cinemas on 2 November. In doing so, director Clare Anyiam-Osigwe became the sixth Black British female director in history to release a feature film in UK cinemas. On 30 November, the film was released theatrically by Artmattan Productions at the Cinema Village in New York. On 19 December, director Clare Anyiam-Osigwe was awarded her first major prize for No Shade, winning the women of colour filmmaker competition at the NY African Diaspora International Film Festival.

=== 2019 ===
On 5 June 2019, it was announced that No Shade would be streaming on the Amazon Prime Video platform in both the U.S. and the UK. It was also announced that the film is to be licensed non-exclusively to MX Player, one of the biggest OTT platforms in India. The license also covers the other SAARC territories of Afghanistan, Bangladesh, Bhutan, Maldives, Nepal, Pakistan and Sri Lanka.

On 4 July 2019, the British Urban Film Festival announced that actor, writer, producer and director Noel Clarke is to receive the BUFF honorary award for his 20+ year career in film and television.

On 5 July 2019, the British Urban Film Festival was announced as a new partner festival for the Iris Prize LGBT+ Film Festival.

From 1–6 September 2019, the 14th British Urban Film Festival was hosted at Met Film School, Ealing Studios. 52 films were screened in addition to 3 live script readings and 3 days of workshops and masterclasses. The opening night film was 'Lara and The Beat' (directed by Tosin Coker) and starring Nigerian actress and singer Seyi Shay (originally from Tottenham, North London). The closing night film was 'Faces' (directed by Joseph A. Adesunloye) and starring Terry Pheto ('A United Kingdom'), Aki Omoshaybi and Shingai Shoniwa (former lead singer of The Noisettes).

On 7 September 2019, the 5th annual BUFF awards were held, also at Met Film School, Ealing Studios and hosted by radio personality Linda Egwuekwe & the actor & filmmaker Femi Oyeniran. Awards were handed out in 7 categories including best short film (sponsored by Met Film School) and won by 'Smack Edd' (directed by Greg Hall); best actress (won by Terry Pheto for 'Faces'); best actor (won by Aki Omoshaybi for 'Faces'); best documentary (won by director Richard Etienne for 'The ID Project: My Dominica Story); best live script (presented by HBO and won by Jo Southwell for 'Loyalty', Eno Enefiok for 'Asylum', Malcolm J Solomon for 'Raped); best feature film (won by director Joseph A. Adesunloye for 'Faces'). Noel Clarke was presented with the BUFF honorary award for 20 years outstanding contribution to film and television. He received the accolade from actors Ashley Walters and Wil Johnson.

On 27 December 2019, it was announced in the New Year's Honours list that British Urban Film Festival founder and Chairman Emmanuel Anyiam-Osigwe is to receive an MBE for services to the Black and Minority Ethnic film industry.

=== 2020 ===
On 5 March 2020, Emmanuel Anyiam-Osigwe was awarded with his MBE medal by HRH Charles, Prince of Wales at Buckingham Palace.

On 10 March 2020, Emmanuel Anyiam-Osigwe was announced as 1 of the 100 most influential people in London in a list published by the London Power 100.

On 2 June 2020, Pride Magazine Nigeria published a story in which Emmanuel Anyiam-Osigwe called out BAFTA for their hypocrisy on social media over a Black Lives Matter tweet the film charity published as a response to the death of unarmed Black American civilian George Floyd.

On 29 July 2020 Niall Paterson (journalist) (from Sky News) interviewed Emmanuel Anyiam-Osigwe (founder of the British Urban Film Festival). The discussion centered on the UK Government's announcement of a £500 million pound scheme to help Film and TV struggling with COVID-19-related insurance costs.

On 29 August 2020 Gamal Fahnbulleh from Sky News spoke with Emmanuel Anyiam-Osigwe in the hours following the untimely death of actor Chadwick Boseman at the age of 43. His comments were later used online in a Sky News article which was headlined "Why did Black Panther have such a huge impact".

On 5 October 2020 it was announced that the British Urban Film Festival was granted BAFTA accredited status by the British Academy of Film and Television Arts. As a Section B qualifying festival, British short films must be selected to screen at BUFF plus another Section B qualifying festival over a 12-month period before the film can be entered for BAFTA eligibility. It was also announced that BUFF was granted AMAA-qualifying status by the Africa Movie Academy Awards.

On 8 December 2020, the opening virtual event of the 2020 British Urban Film Festival featured a 90-minute interview moderated by Emmanuel Anyiam-Osigwe. Entitled 'The Changing Faces of BAFTA', the guest panellists were BAFTA chair Krishnendu Majumdar (the first person of colour appointed to the post in its 73-year history) and BAFTA film committee chair Marc Samuelson.

On 18 December 2020, the British Urban Film Festival became the first UK film festival to host all of its official selections (71 in total) on Apple with the launch of a room on the Apple TV app. An additional 16 films were screened as part of BUFF On Demand on the festival's official website.

On 25 December 2020, the 6th annual BUFF awards were held at Met Film School, Ealing Studios and solo hosted by the actor & filmmaker Femi Oyeniran. Awards were handed out in 6 categories including best short film (sponsored by Goldfinch) and won by 'Hungry Joe' (directed by Paul Holbrook & Sam Dawe); best actress (won by Ruby Barker for How to Stop a Recurring Dream); best actor (won by Stefan Davis for The Tale of The Fatherless); best documentary (sponsored by Greenlit Fund) and won by director Stephan Pierre Mitchell for Deleted; best live script (presented by First Flights) and won by Charlie Taylor for Chalice and Blade, Brendan Kelly for Made in America and Tim Mallon for Hellwater; best feature film (sponsored by Woolfcub Productions) and won by director Ed Morris for 'How to Stop a Recurring Dream' and best comedy 'Cleaning House' (directed by Shahaub Roudbari).

=== 2021 ===
On 30 April 2021, following a newspaper report in the Guardian newspaper which documented the conduct of BAFTA and the alleged historical conduct of a previous winner of a BUFF award, The British Urban Film Festival revoked their status as a BAFTA qualifying film festival. Founder Emmanuel Anyiam-Osigwe and managing director Clare Anyiam-Osigwe also revoked their BAFTA voting memberships. BUFF also stripped Noel Clarke of the honorary award he received in 2019.

On 6 May 2021, Emmanuel Anyiam-Osigwe was interviewed on Sky News by arts and entertainment correspondent Lucy Cotter. In the interview, he called for resignations at BAFTA following their handling of the Noel Clarke sexual allegations.

On 7 September 2021, Emmanuel Anyiam-Osigwe was appointed to the jury of the Caribbean Tales International Film Festival (in partnership with the Toronto International Film Festival). Anyiam-Osigwe served as one of five jurors who oversaw pitches for five feature films from UK/Canadian/Caribbean co-productions which were developed as part of the 13th annual Creatives of Colour Incubator hub.

On 10 September 2021, it was announced that Emmanuel Anyiam-Osigwe had been appointed as chief columnist for Screenlately.com, providing expert film and TV analysis on a weekly basis.

On 16 September 2021, following an appeal by actors and filmmakers and a change of heart from senior management, the British Urban Film Festival was re-instated to Section B of the BAFTA Qualifying Festivals List.

Speaking at a virtual Black History Month public lecture series hosted by Anglia Ruskin University on 6 October 2021, Emmanuel Anyiam-Osigwe announced that he will be stepping down as director of the British Urban Film Festival after serving 2 terms and 16 years. His successor was revealed as London-based actor Justin Chinyere ('Venus vs Mars', 'No Shade').

On 15 October 2021, it was announced that Emmanuel Anyiam-Osigwe is to produce his 2nd feature film, Finding Forever, under the BUFF Originals banner (BUFF Originals is the production arm of the British Urban Film Festival). The film is to be written and directed by Clare Anyiam-Osigwe with Emmanuel Anyiam-Osigwe serving as Executive Producer.

The 2021 British Urban Film Festival (the first under the stewardship of festival director Justin Chinyere) was hosted at Renaissance Studios in Brixton from 4–9 December. It also marked the return of in-person screenings after a 2-year absence due to the global pandemic.

On 10 December 2021, George Russo won the Best Actor award for his performance in the short film Baby Boy, which he co-wrote with director Greg Hall. The film starred Dior Clarke as Russo's love interest.

=== 2022 ===
On 31 January 2022, highlights of The 2021 BUFF Awards ceremony were streamed exclusively on Bohemia Euphoria, a new UK streamer dedicated to showcasing diverse content. The ceremony took place at London's Peckhamplex cinema (in front of a live audience for the first time in 2 years) and was hosted by Femi Oyeniran for the fourth time in 6 years. Other guest presenters included director James Webber, actress Ruby Barker, actors Arnold Oceng, David Ajala, Andre Fyffe and Stephan Pierre Mitchell. The 3 live script awards were presented by lead judge Clare Anyiam-Osigwe. The recipient of the honorary award was Menelik Shabazz, a prominent Barbadian-British filmmaker and director of Burning an Illusion who died suddenly in June 2021. On behalf of his family, Menelik's friend, the actor and poet Victor Richards received the award which was presented to him by comedian and host Mr Cee.

On 5 August 2022, festival director Justin Chinyere announced 94 official selections for the 17th British Urban Film Festival to be screened at Rich Mix from November 26 - December 3. The festival's opening night will be headlined by the World theatrical premiere of Emmanuel Anyiam-Osigwe's Absolutely Marvellous, marking his debut in the director's chair. Filmed over a 5-year period, the documentary profiles the aptly named Marvel Opara, the visually impaired mother of British Olympic heavyweight boxer Joe Joyce. Featuring interviews with close friends, family and boxing figures including Frank Warren and Spencer Fearon, cameras follow Marvel in and around Putney (where she has lived for most of her life) as well as at ringside to be present for Joe's fights to get a sense of how she comes to terms with her disability.

The 2022 British Urban Film Festival was hosted at Rich Mix in Shoreditch from 26 November - 1 December. The programme included a series of talks with representatives from All3Media, the British Film Institute, PBS and BET UK. For the first time ever, an animated feature formed part of the line-up with the UK premiere of RIFT (directed by Haz Dulull).

On 2 December 2022, The 8th BUFF Awards ceremony took place at Rich Mix and was hosted once again by Femi Oyeniran (for the fifth time) and new co-host Mosique Lavontelle. Awards were handed out in 9 categories including the inaugural 'Best International Film' which was won by 'Remember Me: The Mahalia Jackson Story' (directed by Denise Dowse). Other winners included Nicholas Pinnock who took home 'Best Actor' for his performance in "Can I Help?" and director Tracy Kiryango who won 'Best Documentary' for "Buddleia - The Unchained Story" - sponsored by PBS. The recipient of the honorary award was prolific British Nigerian filmmaker Obi Emelonye in recognition of his 20+ years contribution to cinema with films including Black Mail, The Mirror Boy, Oxford Gardens and Badamasi. Presenting him with his honorary award was producer/director Don Omope (Makate Must Sell, TATU, The Wedding Party).

Also on 2 December 2022, the Scottish crime drama Granite Harbour (co-created and co-written by Adriel Leff) launched on BBC 1. Audiences in Scotland had already seen the 3-part series before it was broadcast to the rest of the UK. Adriel was a previous winner at The BUFF Awards - winning on a record 3 occasions in the best live script category - in 2014, 2016 and 2017.

On 9 December 2022, the 6000th episode of long running soap drama Hollyoaks was broadcast by Channel 4. Viewers had already seen the climactic episode (directed by Clare Anyiam-Osigwe) air on sister station E4 the previous evening. Episode 5999 (which was aired by Channel 4 on 8 December 2022) was also directed by the former lead script judge of the British Urban Film Festival who was making her directorial debut on network television.

Official consolidated figures from BARB revealed that 436,000 watched Episode 5999 - the 50th most watched programme on Channel 4 during that week. 458,000 watched Episode 6000 - the 3rd most watched programme on E4 during that week, behind Episode 5998 (which revealed the murderer of Verity Hutchinson) and the reunion episode of reality show Married at First Sight.

On 22 December 2022, the Black British family drama Riches (created by Abby Ajayi) was broadcast in the UK on ITVX (previously known as ITV Hub), a free streaming service available to audiences in the UK. The 6-part series (originally broadcast internationally on 2 December 2022) was notable for several prominent performances from actors Adeyinka Akinrinade (a former director of the British Urban Film Festival in 2017) who played the character of Alesha and Emmanuel Imani (a previous winner in the Best Actor category at The BUFF Awards in 2016) who played the character of Simon.

=== 2023 ===
On 17 January 2023, the appointment of film producer Paula Crickard as artistic director of the British Urban Film Festival was announced by multiple industry outlets. Also announced was the appointment of Muriel Narh as lead script judge, replacing Clare Anyiam-Osigwe.

On 28 May 2023, BUFF Business Group Ltd was one of 10 Black British owned businesses (from 500 invited applicants) to receive grant funding of $10,000 from the Beygood Foundation, founded by Mrs Beyonce Knowles-Carter. In addition, BUFF Business Group Ltd received access to VC funding with up to $1,000,000 available. Emmanuel Anyiam-Osigwe received the cheque from Mathew Knowles (father of Beyonce) at a special luncheon hosted for the first time in London as part of the Black Parade route, co-inciding with the UK leg of the Renaissance tour.

On 1 September 2023, the British Urban Film Festival announced the relocation of its annual event to the city of Leeds and the town of Halifax. It marks the first ever British Urban Film Festival outside London and will launch with an opening weekend in Leeds on Saturday, October 14 and Sunday, October 15. The festival continues in Halifax on Monday, October 16, through until the awards climax at Dean Clough in Halifax on Friday, October 20. The week long festivities are being hosted in West Yorkshire as part of the region's year of culture celebrations in Leeds (in 2023), and in Calderdale (in 2024). The deal was brokered by Tracy Brabin, Mayor of West Yorkshire, Sarah Richardson, Assistant Director Customer Services for Calderdale Council, Bobsie Robinson, Cultural Services Manager for Calderdale Council and BUFF co-chairs, Clare & Emmanuel Anyiam-Osigwe. With West Yorkshire currently served by film festivals in Leeds and Hebden Bridge, the town of Halifax (based in Calderdale) will play host to BUFF's weekday film schedule, closing with the showpiece awards ceremony at Crossley Gallery in Dean Clough Mills. Also known as Culturedale, the region is fast becoming a major hub for international film and television production attracting companies like the BBC, Netflix and Disney Plus to produce and shoot movies and television programmes including Happy Valley (TV series), Gentleman Jack (TV series), Six Triple Eight and Secret Invasion (miniseries).

In a statement, Mayor of West Yorkshire, Tracy Brabin said: "West Yorkshire's creative industries are thriving, with more and more organisations recognising that this is the place to be. I'm thrilled that this amazing film festival is heading north, giving visitors a chance to explore our magnificent region. This will provide an inspirational experience for those in our communities and beyond, as we build a stronger, brighter region that works for all."

This year's edition, the first held outside of London, ran October 14–20 and opened in Leeds with the first public screening of the documentary "Oluwale" plus the UK premiere of "Mapantsula" (4k version) marking the 35th anniversary of the original release in South Africa.

Other premieres in Halifax included "Suicide Kelly", directed by Jordon Scott Kennedy and "Tour De Moon", directed by Nelly Ben Hayoun-Stepanian.

The climax to the festival (The BUFF Awards) was staged at Crossley Gallery in Dean Clough. Jordon Scott Kennedy's Suicide Kelly won the best feature film award, Andy Mundy Castle's White Nanny Black Child won the best documentary award and Billy Boyd Capes's Wings won the best short film award. Actress Angela Griffin received the honorary award for recognition of a career which has spanned over 30 years. Speaking about BUFF, the Leeds native said: "It's an incredible, incredible event…. encouraging and giving a platform for emerging filmmakers and creatives; for artists who aren't always necessarily represented; and it promotes creativity and diversity "It's an exciting event and an exciting thing to be part of and I'm really grateful to be a part of the British Urban Film Festival story".

=== 2024 ===
On 8 March 2024, the festival announced the appointment of Jennifer G Robinson as its new festival director succeeding Justin Chinyere who held the post from October 2020- March 2024. The festival also announced the appointment of Laurelle Jones as its new artistic director succeeding Paula Crickard who held the post from January 2023 - March 2024. Robinson's first foray into festival production came in 2015 with the Black Filmmaker International Film Festival created by Menelik Shabazz ('Burning an Illusion', 'The Story of Lovers Rock'). She then went on to create Women Of The Lens Film Festival, where it debuted in November 2017, dedicated to the work of Black British women in the film and creative industries. New Artistic Director, Jones, joins BUFF with a background in festival production having worked as festival coordinator for Women of The Lens in 2017. Jones is a seasoned producer in film, TV and radio having served as a full-time producer with broadcaster TBN UK for two and a half years.

Speaking on her appointment, Robinson said: "It will be an honour to take the reins of one of the UK's longest running festivals, which dedicates itself to serving our film and wider communities.

"Even with the tumultuous times we've been having in the industry over the last couple of years, I'm very optimistic about finding new opportunities, which extends the legacy of BUFF.

"I'm really excited to reflect on the past landmarks and be part of building the future of BUFF. Bring it on."

On 22 July 2024, the festival revealed its dates for the 19th edition (17-25 October). Square Chapel in Halifax, Rich Mix, Film & TV Charity in Soho and Genesis Cinema in Whitechapel have been announced as host venues for the eight-day event with organisers confirming that the festival will retain the Up North, Down South hybrid model which has already seen multiple screenings take place this past Spring in London and Halifax. BUFF Artistic Director, Laurelle Jones enthused: "BUFF 2024 is ready to take the UK by storm.

From 17-19 October 2024, the festival launched proceedings in Square Chapel, Halifax supported by Visit Calderdale, Calderdale Council, Phoenix Radio (96.7fm) and Creative Minds, a local mental health charity. Premieres included "Here We Are Now" (directed by Miriam Henri), "Baby Brother" (directed by Michael J Long), "Brown Brit" (directed by Jay Stephen & Ralph Briscoe - The Romantix), "My Place Ozerna" (directed by Karina Bedkowska) and "We Will Be Brave" (directed by Chrisann Hessing).

From 18-20 October 2024, the festival launched its London programme at Rich Mix, Shoreditch. Additional premieres included "Rock, Paper, Scissors" (directed by Franz Bohm), "White Guilt" (directed by Marcus Flemmings), "Wof Zerash Coffee" (directed by Sylwia Pecio), "Dynamite" (directed by Uche Aguh), "Redemption Road" (directed by Yusef Bunchy) "African Beauty" (co-directed by Coreon Du & Nataniel Mangue) and "A Man Called Hurt: The Life and Music of Mississippi" (co-directed by Alex Oliver and Jamison Stalsworth).

On 21 October, the festival's industry programme ("Meet the Multi-hyphenates") was hosted at the Film and TV Charity headquarters in Soho, London. CEO Marcus Ryder opened proceedings, followed by a fireside chat with writer-actress Verona Rose, writer-producer-director Mo Ali and writer-producer-director Jesse Quinones.

From 23-24 October, the remainder of the festival's film programme was hosted at Genesis Cinema in Whitechapel with premieres including "Shaping Us" (directed by Kambili Ofili).

The 10th annual BUFF Awards was hosted at Genesis Cinema, Whitechapel on Friday 25 October. Marcus Flemmings's "White Guilt" won the best feature film award; Olz McCoy's "Shaking hands with the devil" won the best documentary award; Linus Von Stumberg's "Syncope" won the best short film award and "Home Office" won the best animation award for co-directors Endre Lund Eriksen and Daniel Damm. Teddy Nygh, the co-founder of Fully Focused Productions, Million Youth Media and director of comedy drama series PRU received the BUFF honorary award from Remel London for outstanding contribution to the industry. The ceremony was streamed on YouTube on 27 December.

=== 2025 ===
In January 2025, it was announced that BUFF founder Emmanuel Anyiam-Osigwe was to resurrect his role as festival director (alongside co-chair, Clare Anyiam-Osigwe) in recognition of BUFF's 20th anniversary. Annie Apakoh was announced as festival manager.

On 15 January, it was announced that Rock, Paper, Scissors, an NFTS student film inspired by true events in Ukraine, made the final shortlist of nominees in the category of British Short Film at the 2025 BAFTA film awards. The film received its UK premiere at BUFF 2024, making the official selection eligible for BAFTA qualification.

On 16 February, BUFF hosted a private BAFTA watch party attended by co-actor in Rock, Paper, Scissors Milosh Luchanko along with friends, family, industry associates and former BUFF writers, producers, directors, actors and actresses including Brian Bovell, Jordan Pitt, Georgia Curtis, Alex Kayode-Kay and Rachel Walsh-Williams. The watch party was streamed on YouTube from St George The Martyr church in Bloomsbury, London and captured the moment live when it was announced that Rock, Paper, Scissors had won the award for Best British Short film.

On 1 March, following a media blitz which featured guest appearances on ITV's Good Morning Britain, This Morning and BBC Radio London, BUFF hosted an encore screening of Rock, Paper, Scissors at Rich Mix in Shoreditch - attended by director Franz Bohm, co-actor Milosh Luchanko, co-actress Bogdana Kalantay, cinematographer Sunshine Hsien Yu Niu and editor Carmela Schonenberger. Also screening at Rich Mix were the London premieres of fellow BUFF 2024 official selections Baby Brother and It Could Be You.

On 18 March, BUFF founder Emmanuel Anyiam-Osigwe was announced as a keynote speaker for the 4th annual New Black Film Collective convention (TNBFC EXPO) - a key platform for networking and knowledge exchange, designed to accelerate Black representation in the UK and global screen industries. The event, which took place on 25 March at Rich Mix, Shoreditch, was moderated by TNBFC founder Priscilla Igwe and also featured Film London CEO Adrian Wootton, film and TV director Avril Evans, BECTU Black Members Committee chair Faisal Qureshi and producer and entrepreneur Terry Jervis.

On 27 March, it was announced that Brown Brit, a British Asian short film directed by The Romantix (Jay Stephen and Ralph Briscoe), made the final shortlist of nominees in the category of Television Short Form at the 2025 BAFTA TV awards. Originally commissioned for Random Acts, the film received its broadcast premiere on Channel 4 in April 2024 and its UK premiere at BUFF 2024 in Halifax, making it the second official selection from the previous year's festival (which premiered) to be nominated for a BAFTA.

On 7 April, The British Urban Film Festival announced the launch of its literary arm with BUFF Books. On its microsite, the publisher states that it is "dedicated to amplifying diverse voices and untold stories within urban cinema culture. BUFF Books curates, develops, and publishes thought-provoking literature that explores the intersections of race, identity, creativity, and community through the lens of British film". The first book to be published (on World Health Day) was Clarity, a self-help/autobiographical piece written by BUFF co-chair, award-winning filmmaker, skincare formulator and wellness advocate, Clare Anyiam-Osigwe. The book was also made available as a paperback, hardback and e-book via Amazon Books.

On 25 June, BUFF held its annual Media Day at Rich Mix in London, with screenings of Brown Brit and the UK premiere of Under The Gun marking the acting debut of former world heavyweight boxing champion David Haye.

The festival's 20th anniversary edition ran from 10-24 October with Odeon Greenwich, Rich Mix and Genesis Cinema announced as the host venues. UK premieres at Odeon Greenwich included Inmates With Talent (featuring Ice-T), An Enemy Within (starring William Moseley, Patrick Baladi and Tristan Gemmill). Other UK premieres included Letters to Goddo, Water Girl (starring Stella Damasus), Hope (A future beyond rape, murder and war crimes), Skategoat & Fatherless No More. The Wellness Film Festival Launch Summit also formed part of the schedule with a one-day programme in Farringdon.

The awards ceremony was held at Genesis Cinema on 24 October where actor and filmmaker Femi Oyeniran received the honorary award, presented by Aml Ameen. Heavyweight won Best Feature, Softy won Best Short and Skategoat won Best Documentary. Stella Damasus won Best Actress for Water Girl; Elijah Baker received the inaugural best male actor award (named in honour of Anthony Adjekum) for Tapped which also received the best script supervision award for Teoman Sayin.

2026

On 5 February, film critic Kelechi Ehenulo was appointed artistic director. The festival also announced a move from its autumn slot to May, with the 2026 edition scheduled for 4-9 May at Genesis Cinema in London. The festival introduced a revenue-participation model for selected feature films, allocating participating filmmakers 70% of net festival-screening receipts after agreed exhibitor and operational deductions. Seven feature selections were announced in April including Small Gods, The Engineer, The Bridge, C.R.E.A.M, The Dying Trade, Rise of the Legion and It Comes in Waves.

At the awards ceremony on 9 May, actress Jo Martin received the honorary award, presented by Clint Dyer. It Comes in Waves won Best Feature, with Adrian Walters receiving Best Actor; Cimpaye Florence Maris won Best Actress for Small Gods; The Engineer won Best Documentary and Authors of The Estate won Best Short.

Two Black Boys in Paradise won the 2026 BAFTA for British Short Animation, having appeared among BUFF's 2025 award nominations. Molly won the 2026 Iris Prize Best British Short Film award, having screened its UK premiere at BUFF. Magid/Zafar won the £40,000 Iris Prize having been officially selected at BUFF. A Friend of Dorothy (another BUFF official selection) was shortlisted for an Academy award for Best Live Action short.

BUFF Studios

BUFF Studios' theatrical distribution activity included Ireke: Rise of the Maroons, released in the United Kingdom and Nigeria on 25 July 2025 following its presentation at the Cannes Marche du Film. It subsequently released Magazine Dreams on 5 December 2025 and Heavyweight on 23 January 2026.

On 25 September 2026, BUFF Studios released Tina Gharavi's Shadows of Beirut. Its release of City of Masks was scheduled for 30 October 2026.
