= Brash Young Turks =

- Directed by: Naeem Mahmood
- Written by: Paul Danquah
- Produced by: Naeem Mahmood; Charlotte Fletcher; Bernard Kordieh; Mark Cornwell; Melissa Latouche; Ash Mahmood; Paul Chiedozie
- Starring: Melissa Latouche; Paul Chiedozie; Tom Bott; Richard Shelton; Charlie MacGechan; Kimberley Marren; Charles Mnene; Craig Longstaff; Annie Cooper; Julian Glover; D Double E English Frank
- Cinematography: Stephen Roach
- Edited by: Pete Lurie; Naeem Mahmood
- Music by: Edwin Sykes; Biggi Hilmars
- Production company: Trailblazer Films
- Release date: September 2015 (British Urban Film Festival)
- Running time: 91 minutes
- Countries: United Kingdom; United States
- Language: English

Brash Young Turks is a 2015 coming-of-age British crime film directed by Naeem Mahmood and co-directed by his brother Ash Mahmood that tells a fast paced struggle love, crime and power, against all odds. The film stars Melissa Latouche, Paul Chiedozie, Tom Bott, Richard Shelton and Julian Glover among a large ensemble cast.

Brash Young Turks premièred at The British Urban Film Festival in September 2015 and was the fastest selling film in the festivals 10 years of existence.

== Synopsis ==
Set in a stylized and dynamic London, Brash Young Turks follows the interlinking stories of young Londoners dreaming of making it big while wading through oppression, greed and adversity. When troubled teen Mia is plucked from her hellish care home by a gang of charismatic hustlers and go-getters, flashy and fearless, her eyes are opened to a world full of new opportunities and dangers. With dreams of wild success, the group is faced with choices of following secondary careers dominated by big players, or reaching the top of the food chain themselves.

== Principal cast ==
- Melissa Latouche as Mia
- Paul Chiedozie as Terrell Mackintosh
- Tom Bott as Jimmy
- Richard Shelton as Conrad Holmes
- Charlie MacGechan as Dave
- Kimberley Marren as Shaz
- Annie Cooper as Python Team Leader
- Charles Mnene as My-Boy
- Julian Glover as Louis Hartman
- Annabelle Lanyon as Mia's Mum
- Zoë Lister as the British Ambassador
- Craig Longstaff as James Howlett
- Munro Graham as DCI Lister
- Vidal Sancho as Lars
- Paul Chan as The Chinese Ambassador
- Tom Benedict Knight as Phillips
- Isla Blair as Newsreader (voice)
- D Double E as The Insider
- English Frank as Badman

== Release ==
Brash Young Turks premièred at the British Urban Film Festival in 2015 becoming the fastest selling film in their 10-year history. This was followed by a limited theatrical release in the UK. Recently Brash Young Turks had its television début on London Live (TV channel) and is available on digital to Video on demand platforms starting with its release on Amazon Prime Instant Video.

== Soundtrack ==
Grime artist D Double E wrote and performed the Brash Young Turks movie theme alongside Havva titled 'Empire' and was released in October 2016.

== Critical response ==
Brash Young Turks received positive critical response. Hollywood News describing it as "Bold, Brash and Brilliant." In his review, critic Jonathan Baz praised the film's direction as "genius filmmaking from the Mahmood's." FilmDoo described Brash Young Turks as a "brazen and restless crime drama about a brazen and restless generation. Built to be a hyper-sensory experience of fast and dangerous living." Yuppee's Tom Heffernan described the film as "fun, frenetic and physical fable of the coming-of-age of real London youths." Hannah Sayer writing for UK Film Review described Brash Young Turks as "genre defying." University of East London's film magazine 20Four Frames lists the film as a "new urban fantasy." The Evening Standard's Toby Earle praised the film's cinematography as "packing an incandescent punch".

== Accolades ==
At the 10th annual Movie Video & Screen Awards 2016, Brash Young Turks was awarded Best UK Movie. In addition, lead actor Paul Chiedozie also received an award for Best Emerging Talent for his portrayal of Terrell Mackintosh.
