= A Plus (website) =

News and entertainment website

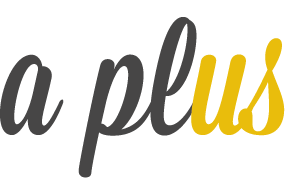
- Company type: Private
- Website type: News and Entertainment
- Available in: English
- Founded: April 2014; 12 years ago
- Headquarters: New York, New York, U.S.
- Founders: Ashton Kutcher, Evan Beard, and Kendall Dabaghi
- Chairperson: Ashton Kutcher
- President: Kendall Dabaghi
- CEO: Evan Beard
- Parent: Chicken Soup for the Soul
- Website: www.aplus.com
- Current status: inactive

A Plus is a digital media company based in New York City. The company produces original written, social, and video content, with a focus on positive journalism.

A Plus was co-founded by Ashton Kutcher, Evan Beard, and Kendall Dabaghi and officially launched on January 27, 2015. The company's editorial team includes journalists from the Huffington Post, Business Insider, and New York Daily News.

The site has approximately 50 million unique monthly visitors with an average of 100 million page views per month. According to Quantcast in November 2014, A Plus was a top 50 website and a top 11 mobile site in the United States.

== History ==
A Plus started as a "product discovery service" in late 2013. It was started by Ashton Kutcher (chairman of the board) and Evan Beard (CEO), who had met at Y Combinator, and by Kendall Dabaghi (president), who had met Beard at Duke University. The firm unofficially began in its current incarnation as a digital media organization in April 2014 in Los Angeles. In summer of 2014 it moved to New York.

The site officially launched in January 2015.

A Plus (aplus.com) is unrelated to A.plus, which was a desktop Twitter app built by UberMedia for Kutcher in 2011. Kutcher had stopped work on the app before teaming with Beard and Dabaghi to build A Plus.

In September 2016 it was announced that Chicken Soup for the Soul had acquired a majority of A Plus.

== Funding ==
A third-party initially invested in the site "in the form of a $300,000 convertible note". On March 19, 2015, Business Insider reported that the company had raised $3.5MM from investors.

== Popularity ==
In August 2014, A Plus claimed 30 million unique monthly visitors. Since then, the number of unique monthly visitors to the site has been 50 million (100 million total), including 27.5 million unique visitors each month from the United States. As of February 2015, the site is around the 3,000th most popular on the internet according to Alexa. It is also among the top 50 sites in the United States according to Quantcast.

A Plus has also partnered or plans to partner with celebrities including rapper Lil Wayne and singers Nicki Minaj, Rihanna, and Britney Spears, whose sharing of A Plus content is expected to boost the site's popularity. Despite the view counts and the social media following of Ashton Kutcher and the partnered celebrities, the social media following of A Plus itself remains small in comparison.

== Controversy ==
In August 2014, A Plus was found to be copying articles from websites including BuzzFeed, the Huffington Post, and Cracked.com, sometimes with no attribution. The site was also including Instagram photos on their articles without proper attribution. A Plus claims the plagiarism occurred due to an attempt to automate a content aggregation tool that ended up inadvertently switching original (i.e. lifted from other sites) articles with the rewritten ones (i.e. those intended for publishing on A Plus). However, minor changes were spotted in the plagiarised published A Plus articles, suggesting they were still modified prior to being published. The site has since deprecated the tool and has implemented a plagiarism detector that scans content.

== Relationship with similar sites ==
In its treatment of viral content, A Plus is similar to websites like BuzzFeed and Upworthy. However, the scope of content on A Plus is larger than that on Upworthy, covering more than social and political topics.

== Other ==
Kutcher has used the site as a platform to communicate with his fans and promote social issues. In July 2014, he encouraged his fans to send birthday cards to a child with an inoperable brain tumor. In October 2014, Kutcher announced his daughter's name and posted photos of newborns including her on the site. In November 2014, he posted Save the Children's "Most Shocking Second a Day" public service announcement on the site, which resulted in 10 million page views of the video and made it the second most-viewed brand video of the week on YouTube. On April 1, 2015, Kutcher pranked mobile visitors of the site. Mobile users who scrolled to the bottom of an article received calls from Kutcher, and those who answered the call were directed to a screen that shows the actor with the message: April Fools. Trick Your Friends. On April 20, 2015, Kutcher shared on Facebook an A Plus article about The unique connection, a Pandora video advertisement showing blindfolded children identifying their mothers in a line-up, writing "I could watch this all day."
