= Angela Hazeldine =

British actress and musician (born 1981)

- Born: Angela Lee Hazeldine; 2 July 1981 (age 45); Colwyn Bay, Wales, United Kingdom
- Occupations: Actress; musician
- Years active: 1998–present

Angela Lee Hazeldine (born 2 July 1981) is a British actress and musician from Colwyn Bay, Wales, known for portraying Gemma Craig in the Channel 5 soap opera Family Affairs.

== Background ==
Angela Lee Hazeldine was born on 2 July 1981 in Colwyn Bay. Her father was a cousin of actor James Hazeldine. She is the niece of Stephen Moore and a cousin of Robyn Moore and Sam Hazeldine.

== Career ==
=== Acting ===
Hazeldine played the role of Gemma Craig in Family Affairs for four years. She has also guest starred in episodes of Kavanagh QC, Heartbeat, The Royal Today and Doctors. She made her feature film debut in Kapital, a 2007 collaboration between writer/director Greg Hall and composer Steve Martland. She is also to appear in Hall's next film, Same Shit, Different Day.

=== Music ===
Hazeldine sings and plays keyboards in Manchester-based band the Circus Electric, with Sam Stockman on guitar and lead vocals. They started after the demise of Shepherd's Pi, a band formed while she was working on Family Affairs and included co-stars Sam Stockman and Rupert Hill.

From 2019 Hazeldine is the lead singer in Manchester-based band Secluded Sea, with songwriter and ex Twisted Wheel (band) drummer Blair Murray.

== Filmography ==
Year	Title	Role	Notes
1998	Kavanagh QC	Teenage patient — "Memento Mori" (#4.1); 17 March 1998, ITV1	TV series
1999– 2003	Family Affairs	Gemma Craig — cast regular; 1999–2003, Channel 5	Soap opera
2007	Heartbeat	Julia Walcott — "Mind Games" (#16.19); 1 July 2007, ITV1	TV series
2007	Kapital	Elizabeth	Feature film (writer & director: Greg Hall)
2008	The Royal Today	Helen Travers — one episode (#1.13); 23 January 2008, ITV1	Soap opera
2008	Doctors	Claire Baker — "Hopelessly Devoted" (#9.207); 13 March 2008, BBC One	Soap opera
2010	SSDD: Same Shit Different Day	Sophie	Feature film (writer & director: Greg Hall)
