= Oasis (British TV series) =

- Starring: Dean Gaffney; John Simm
- Country of origin: United Kingdom
- Original language: English
- No. of series: 1
- No. of episodes: 10

Production
- Running time: 30 min.
- Production company: Carlton Television

Original release
- Network: ITV
- Release: 5 January – 9 March 1993

Oasis is a short lived CITV drama series which was about a group of children who ran an inner city farm. It is best known for featuring John Simm and Dean Gaffney. It was set in a wasteland site in south London.

The drama series ran from 5 January to 9 March 1993 for 10 episodes, made by Zenith North, the team behind Byker Grove for Carlton; their first children's drama series for the ITV network.

== History ==
Oasis is Carlton Television's first significant television series for children and has 10 episodes. Barry Purchase, whose previous writing credits included Tucker's Luck and Grange Hill, is the Oasis's writer. Produced by John Price, it was directed by Chris Clough and Joanna Hogg. Peter McNamara whose past roles have been the antihero or a goon, plays a completely different role as "a loveable down-and-out who becomes a kind of hero to local children he meets in an inner city wilderness". McNamara, who has asthma and a horse allergy, filmed multiple shots with the horses.

== Plot summary ==
Appalled by the animal cruelty, Jimmy Cadogan, a rodeo clown, leaves his job and directs his efforts towards starting a city farm that serves as a sanctuary for animals he saves. He works with a learned drifter and dropout, Posh Robert, and children to transform The Jungle, a South London wasteland, into a farm, against the wishes of the council and the antihero Bob Bulger.

== Cast ==
- Peter McNamara - Jimmy Cadogan
- Ray Armstrong - Graham Robbins
- Sarah Carver - Jane Durant
- Daniel John - Ian Finton
- George Russo - Johnny Mandell
- John Simm - Posh Robert
- Kelly Frost - Skates
- Bill Stewart - Bulger
- Peter Russell - Leonard
- Dean Gaffney - Mickey Drake
- Daniel Brown - Georgie McNiven

== Reception ==
In a critical review, Pat Moore wrote in The Stage, "I hope this series will be popular with children because the plot seems plausible and city-kids can at least identify with the problem of having nowhere safe to play. Some of the older cast members do seem to be overacting, however, a fault I've noticed before in children's productions. Kids are far quicker at detecting a baddie or the untrustworthy than many adults, so snarling a lot just looks daft."

Maggie Drummond of The Daily Telegraph stated, "There is a sad lack of useful factual programmes for teenagers; even worse is the lack of drama redeemed only by the new 10-parter Oasis (Carlton) set in a south London wasteland inhabited by youngsters who behave like mini Arthur Daleys." The Times's Melinda Wittstock called the television series "a ground-breaking children's drama".
