= George Russo =

English actor and screenwriter

- Born: 1980 (age 45–46); London, England
- Occupations: Actor, screenwriter, producer
- Years active: 1991–present

George Russo is a British actor, screenwriter and producer.

== Early life and education ==
Russo was born and raised in London. Russo trained at the Anna Scher Theatre School in Islington. In 2005, he took time away from acting to concentrate on a degree at Central St Martins College of Art and Design. Russo is of Italian descent.

== Career ==
In 2020, Russo appeared in the BBC soap opera Doctors as Jason Ridlash. In 2021, Russo won the British Urban Film Festival Best Actor Award for Baby Boy, a short film he co-wrote alongside director Greg Hall. A year later, he was cast as Eric Mitchell for an episode of the BBC soap opera EastEnders.

The film 'Villain' (2020), also written with Greg Hall and directed by Philip Barantini, was the number one film on Netflix UK, Australia and New Zealand and was the New York Times critics' pick.

== Filmography ==
=== Film ===
Year	Title	Role	Notes
1995	Point Dume	Calvin Watkins	
2001	Skin Deep	Skeggs	Short film
2005	Tony	Mackey	Short film
2008	Zebra Crossing	Blakey	
2009	Tony	Mackey	
2010	Shitkicker	Ronnie	Short film
2011	Turnout	George	Also writer
2012	Next Exit	Peter	Short film
2014	I Am Soldier	JJ	
2014	Top Dog	Graham Hawkins	
2015	A Stranger Kind	Dicky	Short film
2016	Trespass Against Us	Armed Policeman	
2016	Wonderkid	Manager	Short film
2017	Bonded by Blood 2	Damon Alvin	
2017	My Name Is Lenny	Frank Warren	
2017	London Heist	Mason	
2017	The Composer	Policeman	Short film
2018	The Marine 6: Close Quarters	Detective	
2018	Trigger Finger!	Gavin	Short film
2019	Smack Edd	Edd	Short film; also writer
2019	The Corrupted	DI Frank Walsh	
2020	Villain	Sean Franks	Also writer and executive producer
2021	Baby Boy	Nicky Reed aka Skinny Nicky	Short film; also writer
2021	Rise of the Footsoldier: Origins	Joey Waller	
2022	The Turn of the Screw	Danny Arthur	Short film
2023	Rise of the Footsoldier: Vengeance	Joey Waller	
2023	Wuss	Nick	Short film
2023	13 Seconds	Cutter	Short film
TBA	Thirteen Cars	Lenny	Post-production

=== Television ===
Year	Title	Role	Notes
1991	EastEnders	Jason Warren	3 episodes
1992	Me, You and Him	Simon	Episode: "Off His Trolley"
1993	Oasis	Johnny Mandell	7 episodes
1994	Casualty	Billy Faraday	Episode: "Tippers"
1994	Little Napoleons	Graham	Episode: "The Godfathers of Education"
1996	Accused	Billy Murray	Episode: "Billy"
1997	Kavanagh QC	Graham Foster	Episode: "The Ties That Bind"
1997	Bramwell	Lab Assistant	Episode: "The Vaccination Experiment"
1992–1998	The Bill	Various	7 episodes
1998	The Things You Do For Love: I Still Believe	Simon	Television film
1999	Maisie Raine	Stuart Farrel	Episode: "To Sleep..."
1999	Daylight Robbery	Joyrider	Episode: #1.2
2000	Urban Gothic	Macca	Episode: "The Boy's Club"
2003	Manchild	Drug Dealer	Episode: #2.2
2010	Doctor Who	Philip	2 episodes
2010, 2018	Holby City	Jules O'Hanlon Paul Clarke	2 episodes
1999–2014	Silent Witness	Danny Mark Bond	4 episodes
2015	Call the Midwife	Frank Robbins	Episode: #4.4
2020	Doctors	Jason Ridlash	Episode: "Firewalks"
2022, 2025	EastEnders	Eric Mitchell	2 episodes
2023	The Gold	Young Policeman Jack	2 episodes
2023	The Nevers	Simon	4 episodes
2023	Wolf	D.I. Richards	Episode: "Watching"

=== Music videos ===
Year	Title	Role
2004	The Streets: "Blinded by the Lights"	Wedding guest
2012	Devlin feat. Ed Sheeran: "Watchtower"	Devlin's Brother
