= How to Stop a Recurring Dream =

- Directed by: Ed Morris
- Written by: Ed Morris
- Produced by: Polly du Plessis
- Starring: Ruby Barker; Lily-Rose Aslandogdu; Jamie Michie; Miranda Nolan; Andre Flynn
- Cinematography: Ivan Bird
- Edited by: Flaura Atkinson
- Music by: Ibeyi; Nikolaj Torp Larsen
- Release dates: 27 August 2020 (London Arts Film Festival); 9 November 2021 (internet)
- Running time: 82 minutes
- Country: United Kingdom
- Language: English

How to Stop a Recurring Dream is a 2020 British drama film directed by Ed Morris, starring Ruby Barker, Lily-Rose Aslandogdu, Jamie Michie, Miranda Nolan and Andre Flynn.

== Cast ==
- Ruby Barker as Yakira
- Lily-Rose Aslandogdu as Kelly
- Jamie Michie as Paul
- Miranda Nolan as Michelle
- Andre Flynn as Chin
- David Bromley as Marlin
- Bartley Burke as Officer Simon
- Lee Byford as Police Officer
- Philip Desmeules as Officer Coleman
- Kurt Erickson as Rambler
- Adam Hugill as Kayden
- Jack Pierce as Officer John
- Ian Porter as Rambler
- Janet Walker as PC Chilvers

== Release ==
The film won the Best Feature award at the British Urban Film Festival. For her performance in the film, Barker won the festival's Best Actress award. The film was released to digital streaming platforms on 9 March 2021.

== Reception ==
Zehra Phelan of Flavourmag wrote that Morris "captures the pain and anguish of fragmented families that bury their issues under the carpet with potent realism."

Sophie Cook of FilmHound rated the film 3 stars out of 5 and wrote that it "is explorative but retains an interesting narrative, a good amount of twists, and top acting that impresses throughout."

Cath Clarke of The Guardian rated the film 2 stars out of 5 and called it "half-baked" while praising Barker's performance.

Edward Porter of The Sunday Times rated the film 2 stars out of 5.
