= Bill Stewart (actor) =

English actor (1942–2006)

- Born: William Stewart; 7 December 1942; Liverpool, Lancashire, England
- Died: 29 August 2006 (aged 63); London, England

Bill Stewart (7 December 1942, in Liverpool, Lancashire, England – 29 August 2006 in London) was an English actor best known for his role as Denton Evening News reporter Sandy Longford in the British television programme A Touch of Frost. He also made appearances on Z-Cars, a stand-out role as Metropolitan Police liaison officer Dingle in the BBC cult political thriller Edge of Darkness, and on US TV MacGyver. His film credits include hits such as 101 Dalmatians and Anna and the King.

He died on 29 August 2006 of motor neurone disease.

== Filmography ==
Year	Title	Role	Notes
1982	Made In Britain	Peter Clive	(TV movie)
1985	Morons from Outer Space	Walters	
1986	Pirates	Ginge	
1990	The Fool		
1992	Hostages	1st Undertaker	
1993	Splitting Heirs	Adoption Agent	
1993	Oasis	Bulger	
1994	Black Beauty	Coachman	
1996	When Saturday Comes	Bullneck	
1996	101 Dalmatians	Arresting Officer	
1997	FairyTale: A True Story	Chess MC	
1999	Anna and the King	Mycroft Kincaid	
2000	Bear with Me	Conservation Officer #1	
2002	Tom & Thomas	Finch	
2006	Copying Beethoven	Rudy	(final film role)
