= Evan Beard =

American entrepreneur and engineer

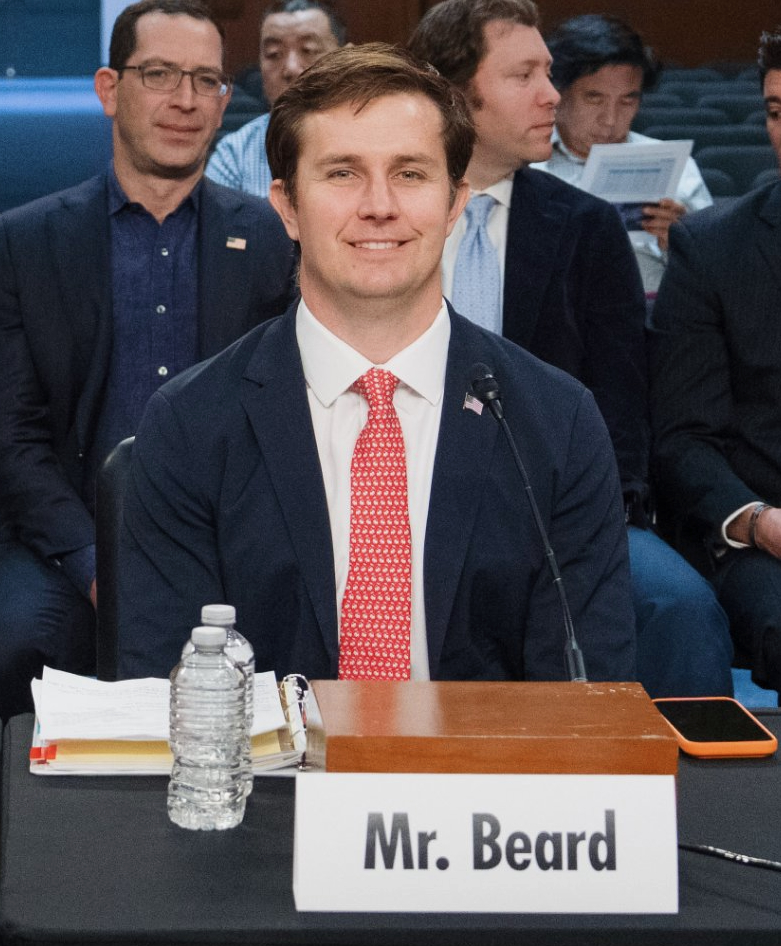
- Born: December 3, 1986 (age 39); Annapolis, Maryland, US
- Education: Duke University

Evan Beard (born December 3, 1986) is an American entrepreneur and engineer. He is a co-founder, chief executive officer, and chief engineer of Standard Bots, an industrial robotics company headquartered in Glen Cove, New York that has raised more than $260 million from investors including General Catalyst and Amazon and reached a valuation of $1 billion in 2026. Earlier in his career, Beard co-founded the contact-management startup Etacts, which was acquired by Salesforce, and the web-security startup ArmorHub, which was acquired by Spirent Communications; he later co-founded the media company A Plus with Ashton Kutcher.

Beard was an early participant in the Y Combinator accelerator. He has been named to Forbes's "30 Under 30" list, which the magazine describes as featuring "the brightest young entrepreneurs, breakout talents and change agents," and to Business Insider's "Silicon Alley 100" list of "the most inspiring and influential people in New York tech." He has testified repeatedly before the United States Congress, including the Joint Economic Committee and the House Committee on Science, Space, and Technology, on robotics and domestic manufacturing. He was named to the National Security Commission on Robotics for Advanced Manufacturing. Beard has discussed robotics in broadcast media and at industry events, including the BBC documentary series Panorama and Nvidia's GTC conference, and he and Standard Bots' robots appear in the 2024 A24 film Babygirl.

== Early life ==
Beard attended Duke University, where he studied computer science and graduated with distinction in economics in 2009. While finishing school he wrote a widely distributed iOS app, “Girlfriend Keeper”, which attracted attention from international media, including Good Morning America, the LA Times, Cosmopolitan Magazine, and local news and radio stations. The app asked for details about one's significant other and sent automated emails and text messages expressing affection, such as "it's only 67 days until your birthday, I might get you something green like your eyes".

== Career ==
=== Etacts ===
In 2009, shortly after graduating college, Beard co-founded Etacts and was admitted to the Y-Combinator seed accelerator. Etacts was a relationship management app that provided a unified view of one's contacts and all emails, calls, and texts with them. It allowed setting reminders on one’s contacts to remember to stay in touch with them. It also provided a contextual widget within Gmail that automatically showed biographical details next to emails, such as the education and work history of your correspondents. The company raised $700,000 from prominent angel investors, including Ron Conway and Ashton Kutcher. In 2010, Etacts was acquired by Salesforce.com, where Beard subsequently worked in engineering as a Senior Member of Technical Staff.

=== ArmorHub ===
In 2011, Beard co-founded Gridtech Inc which created ArmorHub.com. ArmorHub is an app that allows businesses to quickly scan their websites for application-level security vulnerabilities such as SQL Injection and Cross-Site Scripting. ArmorHub was acquired by Spirent Communications, a publicly traded British company.

=== A Plus ===
In 2013, Beard moved to Los Angeles to co-found A Plus with Ashton Kutcher and Kendall Dabaghi. A Plus is a technology-focused media company that creates positive journalism for millennials and uses its own technology for content creation, optimization and distribution. After a soft launch in early 2014, A Plus grew to 50 million unique visitors per month and six months after launch was the fastest growing site in comScore’s Mobile Metrix database. The site raised $3.5m from investors in 2015 and expects $8 million in revenue in 2016. A Plus started in Kutcher’s living room and moved to New York City in 2014.

=== Standard Bots ===
Beard is a co-founder, chief executive officer and chief engineer of Standard Bots, a Glen Cove, New York–based company that develops collaborative robot arms and related software for industrial automation. In July 2024, the company raised a $63 million Series B round led by General Catalyst. In June 2026, Standard Bots raised a $200 million Series C round at a valuation of $1 billion. Around the time of the round, Beard discussed the company and U.S. manufacturing on Bloomberg Tech.

Beard has testified before Congress on robotics and domestic manufacturing. At a November 2025 hearing of the Joint Economic Committee titled "Frontier Technologies, Industrial Efficiency, and Pro-Innovation Policies," he argued that the United States must rebuild its industrial capacity to lead in robotics; he stated that U.S. robot quotes were roughly ten times higher than those from Chinese suppliers, and recommended measures including a national network of manufacturing centers, a manufacturing loan program, and addressing the industry's talent shortage. At an April 2026 hearing of the House Committee on Science, Space, and Technology's Subcommittee on Research and Technology, chaired by Representative Jay Obernolte, Beard recommended establishing a center of robotics and manufacturing excellence in every state—modeled on the federal Manufacturing Extension Partnership but offering more technical assistance and training—to help U.S. manufacturers adopt robotics. At the hearing, Obernolte described Standard Bots as "America's largest industrial robot manufacturer." In 2026 he was named to the National Security Commission on Robotics for Advanced Manufacturing, established by the Special Competitive Studies Project. Beard and Standard Bots' robots appear in the 2024 A24 film Babygirl.
