= Beowulf: An Adaptation =

Novel by Julian Glover

Beowulf: An Adaptation is a novel by Julian Glover published in 1987.

== Plot summary ==
Beowulf: An Adaptation is a novel in which the 8th century Beowulf is recreated in modern English while omitting its longer digressions.

== Reception ==
Dave Langford reviewed Beowulf: An Adaptation for White Dwarf #97, and stated that "it reads very well, especially aloud, and is finely illustrated by Sheila Mackie. Something to spend those Xmas book tokens on."

== Reviews ==
- Review by Maureen Porter (1988) in Vector 142
