= Lily-Rose Aslandogdu =

British actress (born 2003)

- Born: 19 March 2003 (age 23); Harlow, England
- Other name: Lily Aslandogdu
- Years active: 2014–present

Lily-Rose Aslandogdu (born 19 March 2003) is an English actress. She began her career as a child actress in the Save the Children short If London Were Syria (2014) and its sequel (2016). More recently, she is known for her role in the Apple TV+ series The Essex Serpent (2022). Her films include How to Stop a Recurring Dream (2020).

== Early life and education ==
Aslandogdu was born in Harlow, Essex to an English mother, Jacqui, and a Turkish father, and grew up in the Brays Mead area. Aslandogdu attended Burnt Mill Academy and then Epping St John's School. She also took classes at the Kevin Adams Academy.

== Career ==
After appearing in adverts for Quorn and Argos, Aslandodgu starred in the 2014 short charity commercial If London Were Syria for Save the Children, about a hypothetical scenario in which a British girl became a refugee. On YouTube, where it was titled Most Shocking Second a Day Video, the video gained 23 million views in less than one week. Aslandodgu would go on to reprise her role in the video's 2016 sequel. Also in 2014, she voiced young Anathema Device in the BBC Radio 4 adaptation of Neil Gaiman and Terry Pratchett's Good Omens.

Aslandogdu was subsequently cast in the 2016 fantasy film A Monster Calls, marking her feature film debut. She also guest starred in an episode of Houdini & Doyle on ITV and played Belinda Mullucks in two episodes of Call the Midwife on BBC One. This was followed by an appearance in the 2017 romantic comedy film Modern Life Is Rubbish, as well as a recurring role as Alice Roosevelt in the first season of the TNT period drama The Alienist in 2018.

In 2020, she and Ruby Barker starred as sisters Kelly and Yakira respectively in the thriller film How to Stop a Recurring Dream. In 2022, Aslandogdu had a prominent role as Naomi Banks in the Apple TV+ miniseries adaptation of The Essex Serpent.

== Filmography ==
=== Film ===
Year	Title	Role	Notes
2016	A Monster Calls	Lily	
2016	Trigga	Mae	Short film
2017	Modern Life Is Rubbish	Sally Jones	
2019	Home	Bella	Short film
2020	How to Stop a Recurring Dream	Kelly	

=== Television ===
Year	Title	Role	Notes
2014	If London Were Syria	Lily	Charity short, also known as Most Shocking Second a Day Video
2016	Houdini & Doyle	Julia Hargreaves	Episode: "The Curse of Korzha"
2016	Still the Most Shocking Second a Day	Lily	Charity short
2016–2017	Call the Midwife	Belinda Mullucks	2 episodes
2018	The Alienist	Alice Roosevelt	3 episodes
2022	The Essex Serpent	Naomi Banks	Miniseries

== Audio ==
- Good Omens (2014) as Young Anathema Device, BBC Radio 4
