= Ruby Barker =

British actress (born 1996)

- Born: 23 December 1996 (age 29); Islington, London, England
- Occupation: Actress
- Years active: 2015–present

Ruby Barker (born 23 December 1996) is a British actress. She is best known for playing Marina in the Netflix period drama Bridgerton (2020–2022). She was awarded Best Actress at the British Urban Film Festival for her starring role in the film How to Stop a Recurring Dream (2020).

== Early life ==
Barker was born in Islington to parents from Ireland and Montserrat. She joined her sister Harriet in the foster care system just after she was born, and the two were adopted. Barker spent her early childhood in London and Winchester before growing up in Glasgow until her teen years. While living in Glasgow, she took weekend classes at the Elizabeth Murray School of Dance. Her earliest acting experience was in an RBS advertisement.

Her parents eventually separated, and Barker moved to Church Fenton, a village in the Selby District of Yorkshire, with her mother and stepmother. She attended Tadcaster Grammar School nearby. She planned to study international relations at the London School of Economics after taking a gap year, but decided to pursue drama instead. She worked at the National Railway Museum in York while participating in local theatre productions.

== Career ==
Barker played Mercy and Titivillus in the 2015 National Centre for Early Music production of Mankind. She was discovered by Royal Shakespeare Company director Phillip Breen, who cast her as Mary in the 2016 York Mystery Plays and helped her get signed with an agency. Barker then began to appear on television, landing a recurring role as Daisie in the fifth series of the CBBC teen fantasy series Wolfblood. In 2018, Barker starred as Private Sarah Findlay in the play Of Close Quarters at Sheffield Theatres.

In 2020, Barker began playing Marina in the Shondaland-produced Netflix period drama Bridgerton. She made her feature film debut opposite Lily-Rose Aslandogdu in the thriller film How to Stop a Recurring Dream. For her performance, she was awarded Best Actress at the British Urban Film Festival. In 2022, Barker made her London stage debut in Running with Lions at the Lyric Theatre in Hammersmith. She has a role in the 2024 horror film Baghead.

== Personal life ==
Barker was hospitalised in 2022 for mental health reasons, stating that she was "really unwell for a really long time" and had "all this intergenerational trauma bundled up inside" her. She was discharged from the hospital by 30 May 2022. Her mental health had reportedly declined while filming Bridgerton season 1 and resulted in two crises.

In January 2023, Barker lost her father. To honour his legacy, she became an ambassador for the charity Cruse Bereavement Support. Barker broke her arm while rock climbing in March 2024.

== Acting credits ==
=== Film ===
Year	Title	Role	Notes	Ref.
2020	How to Stop a Recurring Dream	Yakira		
2024	Baghead	Katie		

=== Television ===
Year	Title	Role	Notes	Ref.
2017	Wolfblood	Daisie	6 Episodes	
2017, 2019	Doctors	Nina Hobbs / Shelley Williams	2 episodes	
2020	Cobra	Georgia Nixon	1 episode	
2020–2022	Bridgerton	Lady Marina Crane (née Thompson)	Main role (season 1); Guest role (season 2); 9 episodes	

==== Audio ====
Year	Title	Role	Notes	Ref.
2021–2022	The Princess Bride	Buttercup	BBC Radio 4, two-part radio play	

=== Theatre ===
Year	Title	Role	Director	Venue	Notes	Ref.
2015	Mankind	Mercy / Titivillus	Laura Elizabth-Rice	National Centre for Early Music		
2016	York Mystery Plays	Mary		—N/a	York Minster, York	
2018	Of Close Quarters	Private Sarah Findlay	Kate Wasserberg	Sheffield Theatres		
2022	Running With Lions	Imani	Sian Carter	Lyric Theatre		

== Awards and nominations ==
Year	Award	Category	Work	Result	Ref.
2020	British Urban Film Festival	Best Actress	How To Stop A Recurring Dream	Won	
2021	Screen Actors Guild Awards	Outstanding Performance by an Ensemble in a Drama Series	Bridgerton	Nominated	
