= Zoë Lister =

British actress

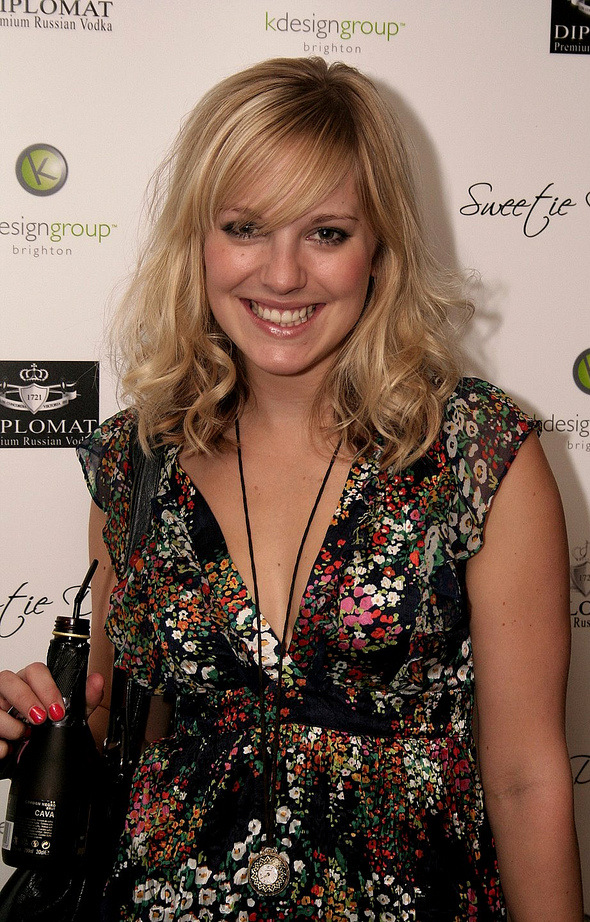
- Lister in 2008
- Born: Stoke Prior, Worcestershire, England
- Occupations: Actress; writer
- Years active: 2005–present
- Spouse: Rob Castell (m. 2015)
- Children: 2

Zoë Lister is a British actress, best known for playing Zoe Carpenter in the Channel 4 soap opera Hollyoaks. In 2014, she began working as a television writer, including work on Hollyoaks, The Lodge and Free Rein.

In 2019, she became the voice for British airline Jet2's advertisement campaigns, one of which, featuring the audio clip "Nothing beats a Jet2 holiday", received considerable attention in 2025 as a viral social media audio trend.

== Career ==
Lister played the role of Zoe Carpenter in Hollyoaks from 2006 to 2010. She appeared as a guest on Big Brother's Little Brother and also presented at T4 on the Beach. In 2009, she performed a Queen medley on Children in Need alongside other Hollyoaks cast members. During 2010, Lister appeared in the play The Stanhope Sisters as Kitty Dutton at The Red Hedgehog in Highgate, London.

From 16 August 2010 until 4 December 2010, Lister toured the UK in the comedy play Teechers as Gail. She appeared as Lady Macbeth at the Royal Court Theatre, Liverpool in 2012.

In 2015, Lister played the British ambassador in the feature film Brash Young Turks.

She briefly returned to Hollyoaks, reprising the role of Zoe for a short stint in April 2017.

In 2019, she became the voice for British low-cost airline Jet2's advertisement campaigns, one of which, featuring Jess Glynne's 2015 single "Hold My Hand", has received considerable attention in 2025 as a viral social media audio trend.

== Personal life ==
Lister ran the 2008 Great North Run in aid of the Parkinson's Disease Society. Her grandmother was diagnosed with Parkinson's disease shortly before her death.

In 2012 and 2013, Lister assisted researchers at Toshiba's Cambridge Research Lab and the University of Cambridge's Department of Engineering to develop "Zoe", a virtual "talking head" which can express a full range of human emotions.

In 2015, she married musician Rob Castell.

== Filmography ==
=== Film ===
Year	Title	Role	Notes
2012	Amy	Amy	Short films
2012	Mad Sad Glad	Audrey Lauren	Short films
2014	Knock Knock	Ivy Rose	Short films
2015	Brash Young Turks	British Ambassador	

=== Television ===
Year	Title	Role	Notes
2006–2010, 2017	Hollyoaks	Zoe Carpenter	215 episodes
2008	T4 on the Beach 2008	Herself - Presenter	Television Special
2008–2009	Hollyoaks Later	Zoe Carpenter	9 episodes
2011	Midsomer Murders	Young Mother Julian	Episode: "A Sacred Trust"
2012	Crime Stories	Louise Miller	Episode: "Cohesion"
2014	Staff Room	Lucy Lucas	5 episodes
2025	The Big Fat Quiz of the Year	Herself - Guest	1 episode
