= If London Were Syria =

Fundraising campaign by Save the Children

- Directed by: Martin Stirling
- Written by: Joe Wade, Richard Beer, Martin Stirling
- Starring: Lily-Rose Aslandogdu
- Distributed by: Save The Children
- Release date: 5 March 2014
- Running time: 93 seconds
- Country: United Kingdom
- Language: English

If London Were Syria, titled on YouTube Most Shocking Second a Day Video, is a 93-second charity commercial, created by Don't Panic London for Save The Children UK, marking the third anniversary of the outbreak of the Syrian Civil War. It features a young British girl experiencing the effects of a hypothetical civil war on the streets of London. Everything depicted in the video was based on the factual accounts of children in Syria. The video's purpose is to depict the lives of children growing up surrounded by war, in order to bring attention to young people caught up in the Syrian Civil War.

The video was shot over two days, and combines the second-a-day and photo-a-day video formats, featuring a young girl's life as it progresses from normal to complete chaos in a year.

== Plot ==
The video features a young British girl experiencing the effects of a hypothetical civil war on the streets of London, by showing a second per day of her life for several days over a year, from one birthday anniversary of hers to the next.

In the opening scene, the girl is at her birthday party, with her parents and friends near her, and a cake with candles in front of her. She is asked to make a wish. Throughout the early part of the advert, she continues to live an ordinary life with loving family and friends. Two disjointed scenes early in the ad present the phrase "ready or not...here it comes" as said by the girl's father. The following scenes then hint at unrest shown via TV news reports, radio broadcasts, and newspaper headlines in the background. Eventually, the Dawn of Civil War becomes more impenitent as military jets fly by and more news about unrest becomes apparent. Soon the war draws closer as the family is forced to leave their homes and an air strike almost hits the girl. They flee again by car and then by foot scrounging for food in bushes. By the end of the video, she has lost her father while running with her mother away from rebel forces shooting nearby. On her next birthday, she is seen at a military hospital bed and is again presented by her mum with a cake and a candle and asked to make a wish albeit a much smaller cake and on a tin plate with only 1 candle. The video ends with the line "Just because it isn't happening here doesn't mean it isn't happening." It is revealed at the end that the video is based on true stories of what children living through the Syrian Civil War experienced, and highlights the work of Save the Children to improve the lives of children in Syria and around the world.

== Reception ==
The ad was released on 5 March 2014. It received news coverage immediately in many UK newspapers and magazines including The Independent, Telegraph, Huffington Post (UK), Express, Metro, and The Mirror. It was also covered in international media such as Time Magazine, Adweek, Al Arabiya, and the Washington Post. The coverage in the Washington Post noted that the video would only seem shocking to people who had not experienced or read closely about the lived experiences of people who had gone through civil wars, and highlighted the newspaper's profiles of refugees from civil wars.

The video acquired more than 23 million views on YouTube in less than a week. The reasons for its virality were dissected by several commentators, including Fairsay and The Drum. The following factors were identified: strong emotions, a video title ("Most Shocking Second a Day") that created what Upworthy has called a "curiosity gap" by providing just enough information to make people click to want to know more, and a smart initial paid promotion and publicity in the right circles. The video was also listed as the first of five highly successful nonprofit branded videos in the first quarter of 2014.

In November 2014, American actor Ashton Kutcher posted an A Plus article about the video on his Facebook page (A Plus is a website co-founded by Kutcher, who is also Chairman of the Board). This resulted in 10 million page views of the video and made it the second most-viewed brand video of the week on YouTube.

As of January 2022, the video has accumulated nearly 79 million views on YouTube. According to Don't Panic London's website, the video was featured twice on the Reddit front page, was shared 920,000 times, and caused Save the Children's YouTube channel subscriptions to increase by over 1000%.

== Sequel ==
In May 2016, Save the Children released a second video, Still the Most Shocking Second a Day, depicting the same girl as she becomes separated from her mother as they flee but gain a younger boy as a companion. The girl would be eventually depicted as going through the refugee process (in France) where she lives through the hardships and the grim reality of being a refugee. Although this sequel/video isn’t as popular as the original, garnering just 8.8 million views as of December 2025 on YouTube.
