= Martin Stirling =

British writer and director working in film, television, and commercials

Martin Stirling (born 17 June 1985) is a British writer and director working in film, television, and commercials. He is known for his contributions to socially committed advertising, writing and directing Save The Children's Most Shocking Second a Day Video (also known as If London Were Syria) and Greenpeace's LEGO: Everything is NOT Awesome. He acted as creative director on Reprieve's Standard Operating Procedure about force–feeding at Guantanamo Bay detention camp featuring rapper and activist Mos Def. He was selected for Shots' New Director Award, and called "one of the internet's most viewed directors" by Director's Notes after amassing 500 million views over a few short videos.

In television, he directed both series of the BAFTA nominated The Mind of Herbert Clunkerdunk starring Spencer Jones and was series director for Buffering a new sitcom for ITV2 starring comedian Iain Stirling. He also directed "The Inventors", an interactive special of BBC's Inside No. 9.

Stirling has received awards in Gold from Cannes Lions, Silver from the Clio Award's and a White Pencil from D&AD. Stirling was also nominated at the International Film Festival of Wales for his film Flushed. In 2012, Stirling entered and won the Sci-Fi-London 48 Hour Film Challenge with the short film Future.Inc.
