= Villain (2020 film) =

- Film poster
- Directed by: Philip Barantini
- Written by: George Russo; Greg Hall
- Produced by: Bart Ruspoli
- Starring: Craig Fairbrass
- Cinematography: Matthew Lewis
- Edited by: Alex Fountain
- Music by: David Ridley; Aaron May
- Distributed by: Vertigo Releasing
- Release date: 28 February 2020 (United Kingdom)
- Running time: 97 minutes
- Country: United Kingdom
- Language: English

Villain is a 2020 British action crime drama film directed by Philip Barantini and starring Craig Fairbrass. It is Barantini's feature directorial debut. The film received generally positive reviews, was the critics choice in The New York Times and reached number seven in the US iTunes movie chart.

== Plot ==
Eddie Franks has just been released from prison after completing a ten-year sentence. Eddie is determined to 'go straight' and return to his old life as the landlord of The Green Man in the East End of London. Unfortunately, he discovers that his younger brother, Sean, has let his pub become seedy and decrepit in his absence. Sean has also become a drug addict, is dating a stripper named Rikki and is in debt to local gangsters, the Garrett brothers for whom he had been working as a drug mule. Sean says that he owed the Garretts for some drugs that went missing in suspicious circumstances.

Meanwhile, Eddie is trying to reconnect with his estranged daughter, Chloe, and meets his baby grandson for the first time. Chloe has an abusive relationship with Jason, whom Eddie assaults in an attempt to protect Chloe. Eddie and Sean carry out renovations of The Green Man and relaunch it. The Garrett brothers threaten to destroy the pub if Eddie and Sean cannot repay Sean's debt. Eddie agrees to hand over the pub in lieu of Sean's debt but gets into an argument with the Garretts, accusing them of having cheated his brother over the missing drugs, which leads to a fight during which Eddie shoots Roy Garrett and Sean shoots Johnny Garrett in the head.

Eddie and Sean then cut up the bodies and attempt to dispose of them but the police come round to investigate the next day. Eddie escapes out of a window and calls Sean from a public phone. Sean, surrounded by police, tries to get Eddie to return to the pub so he can be arrested by the police. Eddie realises what is going on and puts the phone down on Sean and leaves. Sean is then arrested by the police and taken to the police station. Eddie then realises that his brother had not been tricked by the Garretts over his drug debt and had in fact been arrested with the drugs and was now working as a police informant. After robbing a pawn broker, with the help of his old partner-in-crime Mike, to get some money to pay for his escape, Eddie stops off to see Chloe one last time.

After a final farewell to Chloe, whilst walking back to the car, Eddie is shot dead by Chloe's boyfriend, in retaliation to Eddie's previous threats towards him.

== Cast ==
- Craig Fairbrass - Eddie Franks
- George Russo - Sean Franks
- Izuka Hoyle - Chloe Franks
- Mark Monero - Michael Till
- Tomi May - Johnny Garrett
- Eloise Lovell Anderson - Rikki
- Taz Skylar - Jason
- Nicholas Aaron - Steve
- Robert Glenister - Roy Garrett
- Michael John Treanor - Freddie Bagshot
- Marcus Onilude - Mark Watts

== Release ==
The film was released in select theaters, VOD and digital platforms in the UK on 28 February 2020 and in the United States on 22 May 2020.

== Reception ==
The film has a 71% rating on Rotten Tomatoes. The site's critical consensus reads, "Much like its taciturn hero, Villain isn't particularly flashy or creative about getting the job done, but it's still undeniably effective."

Simon Abrams of RogerEbert.com awarded the film two stars and wrote, "Nobody in this movie has a complex inner emotional life, so it’s not surprising that the movie’s ending is ridiculous." Dennis Harvey of Variety gave the film a positive review and described it as "brisk yet flavorful, gritty even when stylish, its occasional plot-logic leap smoothed over by a tone that deftly balances a resigned good humor with violent threat..."
