= The unique connection =

- Directed by: Rasmus Skousen
- Produced by: Malling Publications
- Distributed by: Pandora
- Release date: April 13, 2015
- Running time: 128 seconds
- Language: English

The unique connection is a viral video advertisement (released April 13, 2015) produced by Malling Publications for Pandora, a jewelry brand. As of October 21, 2015, the video has amassed over 17 million views on YouTube and over 15 million on Facebook.

== Production ==
The video was produced for Pandora by Malling Publications, a Danish advertising company. Hanne Fabricius, CEO of Malling Publications, was responsible for the idea and concept, and was also the strategic director of the video. The video was directed by Rasmus Skousen, a Danish photographer who works in the genres of fashion, advertising, and portraits.

== Plot ==
The video features six mothers and their children. All the mothers stand in a line-up. One by one, the children, blindfolded, are assigned the task of identifying which of the six women is his or her mother. The children pull the women down and feel the women's jewelry, clothing, facial structure, and hair in order, and also sniff the women, in order to judge them. In the video, each child is able to successfully identify his or her mother.

== Reception ==
=== Views ===
As of April 24, 2015, the video had over 11 million views on YouTube and over 15 million on Facebook. Adweek ranked it #2 in its list of top five commercials for the week of April 17–24.

=== Critical reception ===
The video was generally praised for its theme of mother-child love as well as its execution of the theme. It was labeled a tearjerker for its ability to connect with and touch a large number of people. American actor Ashton Kutcher wrote of the video: "I could watch this all day."

Two articles on Adweek identified the video as a way for Pandora to get an early start on associating itself positively with motherhood in the weeks running up to Mother's Day, which would be observed on May 10, 2015. One wrote: "It underscores how irreplaceable our moms are, and how important it is to them that we know them well—particularly on days like Mother's Day. (Hint, hint, buy her some personalized jewelry.) [...] It's also a not so subtle hint to her significant other, because c'mon, that 3-year-old isn't paying for the bracelet himself." Another noted: "While the spot contains little overt branding (one of the moms does appear to be wearing Pandora Jewelry, but it’s a quick shot), it ties the brand to the emotional sentiment while encouraging viewers to purchase Pandora Jewelry for mothers day."

Writing for Health, Ellen Seidman offered the following criticisms of the video: overly manipulative in its attempt to use a feel-good theme to sell jewelry, too little racial or ethnic diversity, no role for dads, and grossly inadequate in describing the wonders of the mother-child relationship.
