= Julian Glover =

English actor (born 1935)

Julian Glover CBE
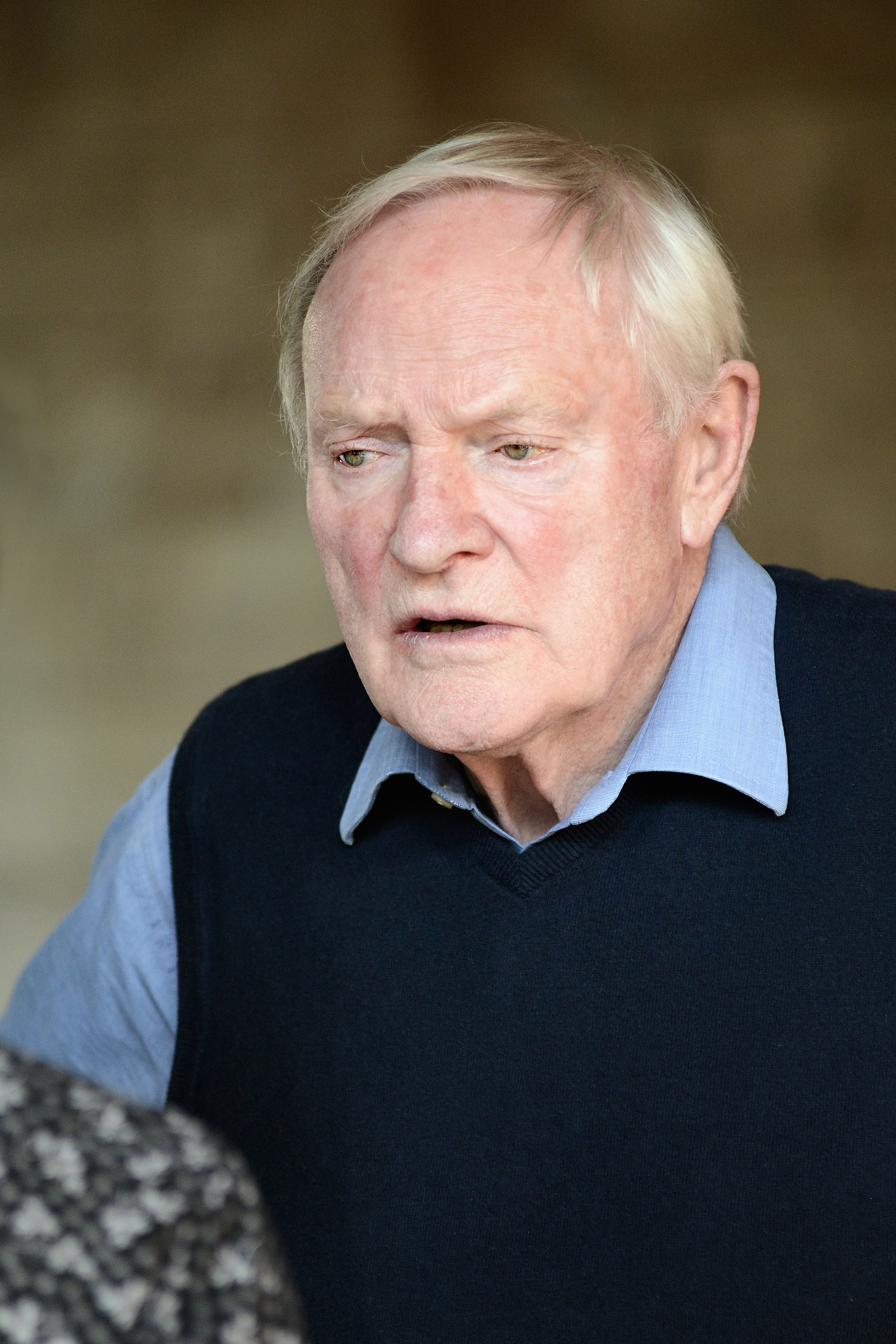
- Glover in 2014
- Born: Julian Wyatt Glover; 27 March 1935 (age 91); Hampstead, London, England
- Education: Royal Academy of Dramatic Art
- Occupation: Actor
- Years active: 1957–present
- Spouses: Eileen Atkins (m. 1957; div. 1966); Isla Blair (m. 1968)
- Children: Jamie Glover

Julian Wyatt Glover (born 27 March 1935) is an English actor with many stage, television, and film roles. Classically trained, he is a recipient of the Laurence Olivier Award and has performed many times for the Royal Shakespeare Company.

Glover's well-known film roles have included playing villains in several major motion picture franchises: General Maximilian Veers in The Empire Strikes Back (1980), Aristotle Kristatos in For Your Eyes Only (1981), and Walter Donovan in Indiana Jones and the Last Crusade (1989). He has also appeared as Brian Harcourt-Smith in The Fourth Protocol (1987), voiced the giant Acromantula spider Aragog in Harry Potter and the Chamber of Secrets (2002), and appeared as conductor Andris Davis in the psychological drama Tár (2022).

Glover has also appeared frequently on television, especially in the UK, including guest appearances in series such as The Avengers, The Saint, Thriller, Doctor Who, Blake's 7, Space: 1999, Remington Steele, and Inside No. 9. He played the recurring supporting role of Grand Maester Pycelle in HBO's Game of Thrones (2011–2016) and appeared as General Beauvilliers in the BBC drama Spies of Warsaw (2013).

== Early life ==
Glover was born in Hampstead, London, the son of Honor Ellen Morgan (née Wyatt), a BBC journalist, and Claude Gordon Glover, a BBC radio producer. Glover and Wyatt divorced in the 1940s, after the birth of a daughter, Prue, and Honor Wyatt subsequently married George Ellidge. Julian Glover's younger half-brother is the musician Robert Wyatt.

Glover attended Bristol Grammar School, where he was in the same class as future actors Timothy West and David Prowse. He also attended Alleyn's School in Dulwich, London. He graduated from the Royal Academy of Dramatic Art in 1954. He also performed national service in the British Army, where he went on the officers' training course.

== Career ==
In the early 1950s, Glover appeared in several shows at Unity Theatre, London, and played Tolen in Ann Jellicoe's The Knack at the Royal Court Theatre in 1962. He also performed at the Royal Shakespeare Company. He became a regular actor in 1960s and 1970s British television series such as The Avengers, The Saint, Strange Report, Doctor Who, Blake's 7, and Space: 1999.

In 1966, Glover played William the Conqueror in A Choice of Kings, then in 1967 featured as Professor Quatermass's nemesis Colonel Breen in the Hammer Films production of Quatermass and the Pit, an adaptation of Nigel Kneale's 1958–1959 BBC TV original. He also appeared twice in Doctor Who: as Richard the Lionheart in The Crusade (1965); and as the villain Scaroth, last of the Jagaroth, in one of the original run's most popular serials, City of Death (1979). Glover later recorded DVD commentaries for The Crusade episode "The Wheel of Fortune" (from the Lost in Time set) and for City of Death.

In the 1980s, Glover made some of his most notable appearances: the Imperial general Maximilian Veers in The Empire Strikes Back (1980), the ruthless Greek villain Aristotle Kristatos in the James Bond film For Your Eyes Only (1981) and the deceptive American Nazi collaborator Walter Donovan in Indiana Jones and the Last Crusade (1989).

On television, he played the leading role of Sir Martin Lacey in the BBC English Civil War drama series By the Sword Divided, and played the guest role of surgeon Arnold Richardson in a 1989 episode of the BBC medical drama Casualty (he made a second guest appearance as a different character in 2011, and also appeared as a different character again in the sister series Holby City in 2014). He played a leading role in the British film Brash Young Turks in 2016.

In the 2002 film version of Harry Potter and the Chamber of Secrets, Glover voiced the giant spider Aragog.

Glover has been associated with the epic poem Beowulf since the 1980s and has delivered staged interpretations in various forms, often taking the role of an Anglo-Saxon gleeman or traveller poet, delivering an abridged version of the tale while standing around a mead hall hearth and rendering selected passages in the poem's original Old English. This adaptation has been shown in documentaries on both the English language and Anglo-Saxon England and was also used for historian Michael Wood's documentary on the poem broadcast during the BBC Poetry Season in 2009. He adapted his interpretation in novel form as Beowulf: An Adaptation.

In 2009, Glover played the role of Mr. Brownlow in the West End revival of the musical Oliver! at the Theatre Royal, Drury Lane. In the short film Battle for Britain (2010), Glover played a 101-year-old Polish veteran Royal Air Force pilot.

Glover portrayed the character of Grand Maester Pycelle in the HBO series Game of Thrones between 2011 and 2016, appearing in a total of 31 episodes across the first six seasons of the show.

In 2013, Glover played the role of General Beauvilliers in the BBC Four drama series The Spies of Warsaw. In May 2014, he played the character Joe Goodridge in two episodes of the BBC TV medical drama series Holby City ("My Name is Joe" and "No Apologies"). In the same year, he portrayed an old man in horror thriller Backtrack as well as a theater performance as The Interlocutor in the 2014 West End transfer of the Scottsboro Boys in October.

In February 2017, Glover participated as a featured guest at the inaugural Saudi Comic Con in Jeddah, Saudi Arabia, alongside fellow Game of Thrones actor Charles Dance.

In 2019, Glover played the role of Nonno in the West End theatre production of Tennessee Williams' The Night of the Iguana at the Noël Coward Theatre.

Glover is an associate member of the Royal Academy of Dramatic Art.

== Awards ==
In 1993, Glover was awarded the Laurence Olivier Award for Best Actor in a Supporting Role for his title role in the Royal Shakespeare Company's 1992 production of Henry IV, Part 1 and Part 2. Theatre critic Michael Billington called his portrayal of the king in that production "superb".

== Honours ==
Glover was appointed a Commander of the Order of the British Empire in the 2013 Birthday Honours for services to drama.

== Personal life ==
Glover has been twice married: to actresses Eileen Atkins and Isla Blair (with whom he has a son, actor Jamie Glover).

In 2020, Glover sold 250 lots of photographs, costumes, props and memorabilia from his career at East Bristol Auctions, including his badge of rank from The Empire Strikes Back and the watch, overcoat and personal script from Indiana Jones and the Last Crusade.

== Filmography ==
=== Film ===
Year	Title	Role	Notes
1963	Tom Jones	Lt. Northerton	
1964	Girl with Green Eyes	Malachi Sullivan	
1965	The Alphabet Murders	Don Fortune	
1965	Time Lost and Time Remembered	Dr. Matthew Langdon	I Was Happy Here alt. title.
1966	Theatre of Death	Charles Marquis	
1967	Quatermass and the Pit	Colonel Breen	
1968	The Magus	Anton	
1969	Alfred the Great	Æthelstan	
1969	The Adding Machine	Shrdlu	
1970	The Last Grenade	Andy Royal	
1970	The Rise and Rise of Michael Rimmer	Colonel Moffat	
1970	Wuthering Heights	Hindley Earnshaw	
1971	Nicholas and Alexandra	Gapon	
1972	Antony and Cleopatra	Proculeius	
1973	Hitler: The Last Ten Days	Gruppenführer Hermann Fegelein	
1973	The Foundation Trilogy	Hober Mallow	Radio production
1974	Luther	The Knight	
1974	Dead Cert	Lodge	
1974	The Internecine Project	Arnold Pryce-Jones	
1974	Juggernaut	Commander Marder	US title: Terror on the Britannic
1977	Gulliver's Travels		Voice
1977	The Brute	Teddy	
1980	Invasion	Alexander Dubček	
1980	The Empire Strikes Back	General Maximilian Veers	
1981	For Your Eyes Only	Aristotle "Aris" Kristatos	
1983	Heat and Dust	Crawford, the District Collector	a.k.a. The Nineteen Twenties in the Civil Lines at Satipur
1984	Kim	Colonel Creighton	
1987	The Fourth Protocol	Brian Harcourt-Smith	
1987	Cry Freedom	Donald Card	
1987	Hearts of Fire	Alfred	
1988	Tusks	Ian Taylor	
1989	Indiana Jones and the Last Crusade	Walter Donovan	
1991	King Ralph	King Gustav	
1994	Power and Lovers	Matthew	
1997	The House of Angelo	Sir Robert Willoughby	
2000	Vatel	Prince de Condé	
2002	The Book of Eve	Burt Smallwood	
2002	Two Men Went to War	Colonel Hatchard	
2002	Harry Potter and the Chamber of Secrets	Aragog	Voice
2004	Troy	Triopas	
2004	Strings	Kahro	Voice; English version
2006	Scoop	Lord Lyman	
2006	Big Nothing	80 Year Old Blind Man	
2007	Shoot on Sight	Susan's Father	
2008	Mirrors	Robert Esseker	
2009	The Young Victoria	Duke of Wellington	
2009	Princess Kaiulani	Theophilus Harris Davies	
2012	U.F.O.	John Jones	
2012	Chasing the Bear	Mentor / Studio Head	
2012	Airborne	George	
2014	Backtrack	The Old Man	
2015	The Timber	Howell	
2016	Brash Young Turks	Lou Hartman	
2016	We Still Steal the Old Way	Sir Edward	
2016	Gangster Kittens	Lord Clarence Beaverbrook	
2017	Amy and Sophia	Jim	
2019	The Pride of Atticus Lee	Atticus Lee	Short
2021	The Toll	Magnus	
2021	Nemesis	Sebastian	
2021	Nobody Has to Know	Angus	
2021	The Laureate	Alfred Graves	
2022	Prizefighter: The Life of Jem Belcher	Lord Ashford	
2022	Tár	Andris Davis	
2023	The Reverend and Mrs. Simpson	Older Charles Wilson	
2023	Forever Young	Jim Petrak Senior	
2024	An Irish Angel	Father Reitel	
2025	Borley Rectory: The Awakening	Harry Bull	
TBA	Banking on Mr. Toad	Vicar Burntwhistle	Pre-production

=== Television ===
Year	Title	Role	Notes
1962, 1964	Z-Cars	Derek/Harold Bolton	Episodes: "Day Trip"/"Lucky Partners"
1963	Espionage	Tovarich	Episode: "Never Turn Your Back on a Friend"
1964, 1968	The Saint	Ramon Falconi/Hilloran	Episodes: "The Lawless Lady"/"Invitation to Danger"
1965	Doctor Who	Richard the Lionheart	Serial: "The Crusade"
1965-9	The Avengers	Vogel/Masgard/Major Peter Rooke/Rupert Lasindall	4 episodes
1968	The Champions	Anderson	Episode: "The Fanatics"
1971	Jason King	John	Episode: "Variations on a Theme"
1971	Play for Today	Wixon	Episode: Michael Regan
1972	Spy Trap	Commander Anderson	36 episodes
1972	Callan	Karskyy	Episode: "That'll Be the Day"
1973	The Rivals of Sherlock Holmes	Alfred Barton	Episode: "The Moabite Cypher"
1974	QB VII	Zaminski	TV miniseries
1974	The Story of Jacob and Joseph	Esau	TV movie
1975	Churchill's People	Richard de Anstey	Episode: "A Sprig of Boom"
1975	The Sweeney	Bernard Stone	Episode: "Queen's Pawn"
1975	Dixon of Dock Green	Lewis Naylor	Episode: "A Slight Case of Love"
1975	Space: 1999	Jarak	Episode: "Alpha Child"
1978	Blake's 7	Kayn	Episode: "Breakdown"
1979	Henry VIII	Duke of Buckingham	TV movie
1979	Doctor Who	Scaroth/Count Scarlioni	Serial: "City of Death"
1982	Ivanhoe	King Richard	TV movie
1982	Nancy Astor	Lord Revelstoke	2 episodes
1982	Q.E.D.	Dr. Stefan Kilkiss	3 episodes (#1, #2, and #4 only)
1983	Dombey and Son	Mr. Dombey	10 episodes
1983	By the Sword Divided	Sir Martin Lacey	9 episodes
1983-4	Crown Court	Anthony Belgrave	2 episodes
1984	Travelling Man	Farmer	Episode: "On the Hook"
1984	Six Centuries of Verse	Himself	Reader
1985	Jenseits der Morgenröte	Kilian von Roggenburg	TV miniseries
1985	Remington Steele	Inspector Lombard	Episodes: "Steele Searching, Part 1" and "Steele Searching, Part 2"
1985	Magnum, P.I.	Duncan Scott / Police Inspector Stokesay	Episodes: "Deja Vu, Part 1" and "Deja Vu, Part 2"
1986	Ladies in Charge	Ernest	Episode: "Zoe's Fever"
1986	Anastasia: The Mystery of Anna	Colonel Kobylinski	TV movie
1987	Mandela	Senior Police Officer	TV movie
1987–1989	Wish Me Luck	Colonel James Cadogan	15 episodes
1989	Casualty	Arnold Richardson	Episode: "Hanging On"
1990	Treasure Island	Dr. Livesey	TV movie
1991	Letters, Riddles and Writs	Joseph Haydn	TV movie
1992	Rumpole of the Bailey	Sir Sebastian Pilgrim	Episode: "Rumpole and the Reform of Joby Jonson"
1993	The Darling Buds of May	George Harran	2 episodes
1993	The Inspector Alleyn Mysteries	Sir Hubert Handesley	Episode: "A Man Lay Dead"
1994	Lovejoy	Frank Whymark	Episode: "Double-Edged Sword"
1995	The Chief	Andrew Blake	7 episodes
1995	Taggart	Supt. Drummond	Episode: "Black Orchid"
1995	The Infiltrator	Ernst Bielert	TV movie
1996	Cadfael	Leoric Ashby	Episode: "The Devil's Novice"
1997	Midsomer Murders	Henry Trace	Episode: "The Killings at Badger's Drift"
2003	Born and Bred	Derek	Episode: Old Flames
2004	Waking the Dead	William Laurence	Episode: "The Hardest Word" (Parts 1 and 2)
2006	The Impressionists	Claude Monet (older)	TV miniseries
2007	Silent Witness	Henry Markham	Episode: "Apocalypse"
2009	Clouds Over the Hill	Alfred Thayer Mahan	TV miniseries
2011	Casualty	Sebastian Farrow	Episode: "To Have and Have Not"
2011	Silent Witness	Istvan Sandór	Episode: "Bloodlines"
2011–2016	Game of Thrones	Grand Maester Pycelle	Recurring role 31 episodes
2012	Lego Star Wars: The Empire Strikes Out	General Maxmilian Veers	Voice; Television special
2012	Merlin	Lochru	Episode: "Arthur's Bane (Part 1)"
2013	Spies of Warsaw	General Beauvilliers	TV miniseries
2016	Grantchester	Albert Tannen	Christmas special
2018	Black Earth Rising	Mark Viner	3 episodes
2019	The Crown	Cecil Boyd-Rochfort	Episode: "Coup"
2021	Inside No. 9	Ralph	Episode: "Last Night of the Proms"
2023	Willow	Zeb	Episode: "Beyond the Shattered Sea"
2024	Moresnet	Stephan Pineau	2 episodes
2025	Surface	William Huntley	2 episodes

== See also ==
- List of actors in Royal Shakespeare Company productions
- List of British actors
- List of Royal National Theatre Company actors
