= Shereen Miranda =

British singer, actress, author, presenter (born 1982)

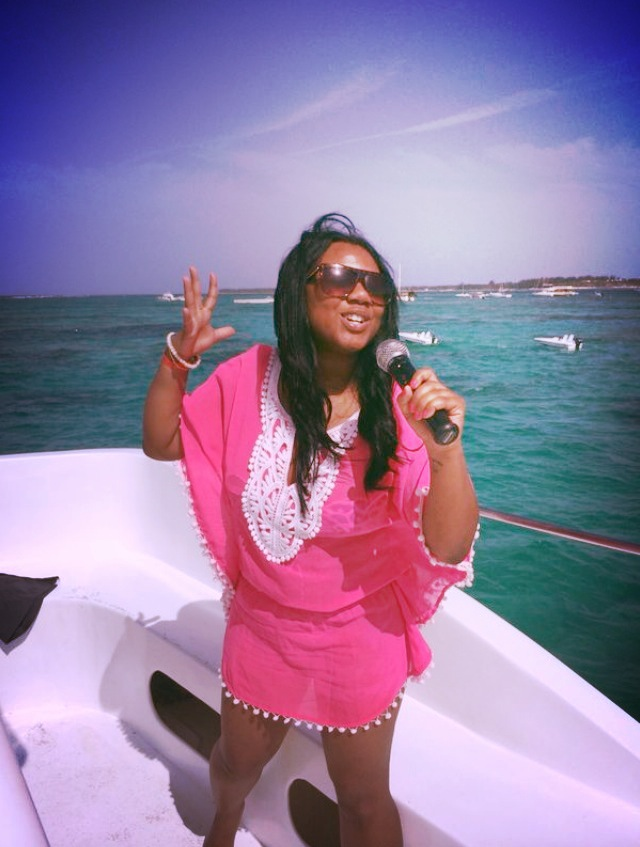
Miranda performing in the Dominican Republic, 2014

Shereen Miranda, born Miranda Shereen Samara Walker (4 July 1982) in Hackney, London, is a British house singer songwriter, actress, author, producer and presenter.

Miranda was classically trained in piano at the Newham Academy of Music between 2000 and 2001. Shereen began writing songs around 2004 when she wrote and recorded an unofficial remix to the track "At Night" by Shakedown (Kid Crème Remix). Her first record, a collaboration with Australian house DJ Ryan Riback called Touch Me on the Dancefloor, was released in 2008 on Vinyl Pusher Records. In February 2009 she released her second record Yes You Are. with Italian house duo Phunk Investigation and Qatar based Trance DJ Paul Mendez on Absolutely Records. Yes You Are became the second-biggest single on the label after a remix of George Michael's "Flawless". She subsequently spent two years in the Dominican Republic between 2009 and 2011 where she recorded various niche songs for French House producer Soulskid.

In 2012, Shereen spent three years in the UK, between London and Birmingham, where she launched the brand "Everyone Loves Shereen". Whilst in the Dominican Republic, she had held a number of select events such as Everyone Loves Shereen: The Beach Party and Everyone Loves Shereen: The Pool Party in the beach resort of Punta Cana. Whilst in London the brand was extended to include a radio show which she presented called Everyone Loves Shereen: The Chat Show. In conjunction with www.feelingmandy.fm; the concept of the show took a light-hearted look at stories in the media, with interactive chat from callers into the studio. The backdrop of the show was to beach house and soulful house music.

In 2013 Shereen wrote a book entitled Akwaaba Akosua, which detailed her account of volunteering in a remote village in Ghana, West Africa. She further went on to present for the British Urban Film Festival at Channel 4 Headquarters in 2013 and 2014.

In 2015, she returned to live in Punta Cana, Dominican Republic where she opened a luxury Real Estate agency with a focus on Sustainability called Shereen Miranda Group and an organic restaurant called Jamaican Jerk Hut. This became Punta Cana's first ever Jamaican restaurant.

In 2020, Shereen continued the influence from her Jamaican heritage writing and recording a summer tack with legendary reggae artist Macka Diamond. Despite no video or promotional material being completed due to the COVID 19 pandemic, the song was a hit on Jamaican radio https://music.apple.com/us/album/mi-feel-good-feat-macka-diamond-single/1524058176

2021 saw an international expansion of Shereen Miranda Group's luxury Real Estate ventures, opening an additional Brokerage office in San Juan, Puerto Rico https://opencorporates.com/companies/pr/462332-711

In 2022, there was a marked revival in Shereen Miranda's creative pursuits. She closed the restaurant and released a best selling book called Prince Gabriel's Magic trees, a fantasy Children's book based on her son Gabriel in Punta Cana https://a.co/d/6c7tkAM
