= Greg Hall (filmmaker) =

British film director

- Born: Gregory Hall; 30 June 1980 (age 46); London, England
- Occupations: Director, Screenwriter, Cinematographer
- Years active: 2003–present
- Awards: Katrin Cartlidge Award for The Plague (2006)

Greg Hall (born 30 June 1980 in London, England) is a British film director, producer, cinematographer and screenwriter.

== Career ==
=== 2004-2014 ===
The Plague (2004) — made when he was a 22-year-old with a budget of just £3,500 — was Hall's feature debut, winning him the inaugural Katrin Cartlidge Foundation Award at the 10th Sarajevo Film Festival. He went on to collaborate with composer Steve Martland on follow-up feature Kapital (2007). Hall also wrote the screenplays for both of these films and was cinematographer for short film The Housewife (2005), which starred Alison Steadman.

In 2013, Hall created the film Communion, starring Paul Martin, about a vicar on the run who strikes up an unlikely friendship with a young punk traveler. A road journey of substance and fruitful rewards, actor Paul Martin stars in this film. In 2014, he directed heist thriller Dangerous Mind of a Hooligan.

=== 2020-present ===
In 2020, he released R.I.P Audrey, a short film he made with his daughter during the lockdowns of COVID-19. That same year, Villain, written and produced by Hall and starring Craig Fairbrass and George Russo, was released. In 2021, he co-wrote Baby Boy with Russo, who went on to win the Best Actor award at the 2021 British Urban Film Festival.

=== Filmography ===
Year	Film	Credited as				
Year	Film	Director	Writer	Producer	Editor	Cinematographer
2003	Front		Yes			
2003	Cages	Yes	Yes	Yes		
2004	The Housewife					Yes
2004	**The Plague**	Yes	Yes	Yes		
2007	**Kapital**	Yes	Yes	Yes		
2010	**Same Shit, Different Day**	Yes	Yes		Yes	
2012	Bruised	Yes	Yes	Yes	Yes	
2013	**Communion**	Yes	Yes		Yes	
2014	**Dangerous Mind of a Hooligan**	Yes	Yes			
2015	**Chester P for Mayor: Hip-Hop, Homelessness and the Housing Crisis**	Yes		Yes		
2016	**Bonded by Blood 2**	Yes				
2019	Smack Edd	Yes	Yes			
2020	Villain		Yes	Yes		
2020	R.I.P Audrey	Yes	Yes	Yes		
2021	Baby Boy	Yes	Yes			

(Feature films, 60 minutes and over, are listed in bold)
