= Edwin Sykes =

Historical figure

Edwin Sykes was Dean of Ross from 1936 to 1948.

Sykes was educated at Trinity College, Dublin; and ordained in 1900. After a curacy in Castlemagner, he held incumbencies at Ardnageehy, Cork, Shandon and Abbeystrewry.
