= FilmDoo =

UK-based video-on-demand (VOD) platform

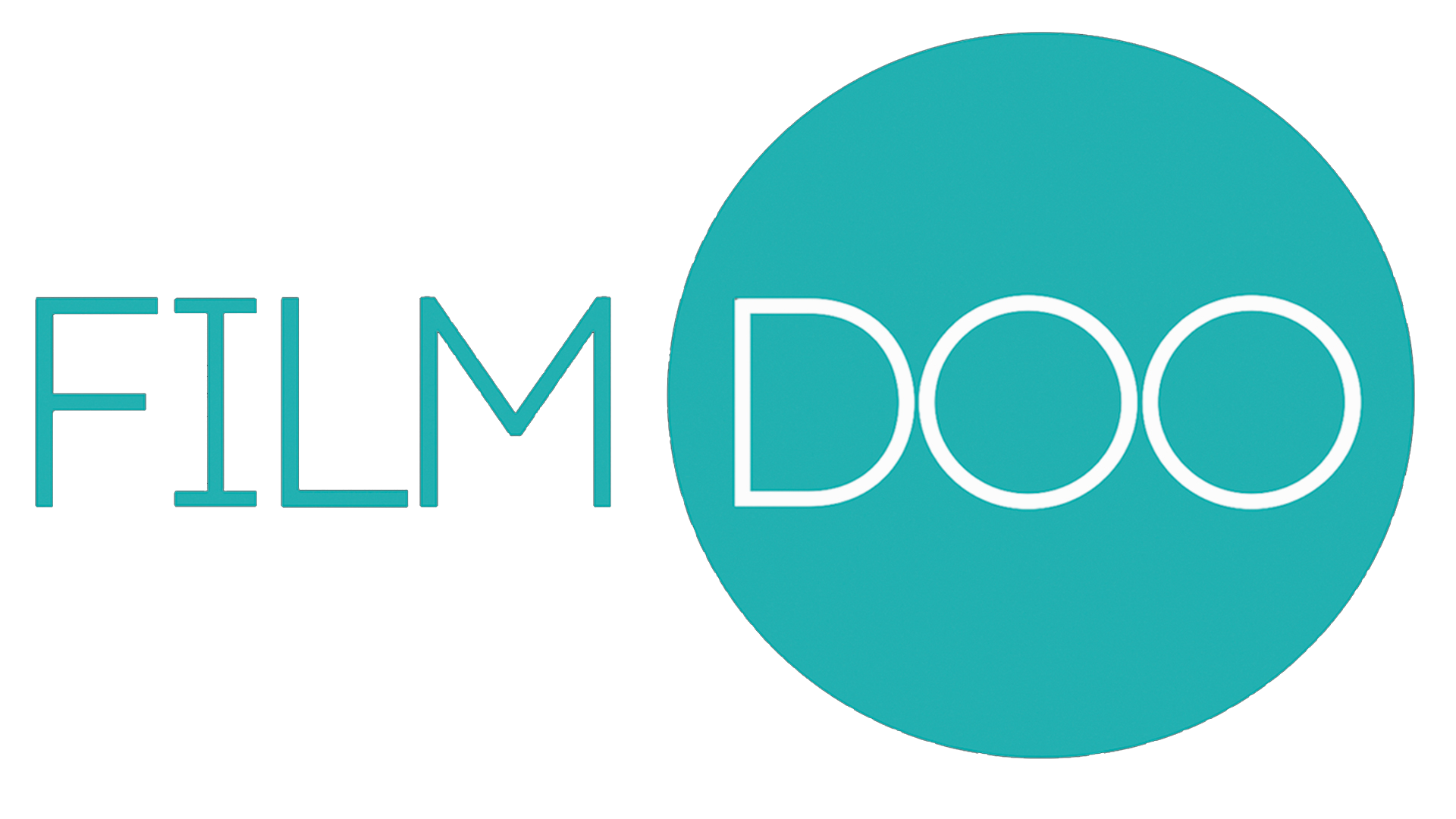
- Website type: streaming video / educational technology
- Creator: Weerada Sucharitkul (Founder)
- Website: www.filmdoo.com
- Current status: Active

FilmDoo.com is a UK-based video-on-demand (VOD) platform that specialises in independent and world cinema.

Described by Guy Lodge of The Guardian as "one of the more discerning new streaming services on the block," the platform has received media attention for giving international releases to films that had previously received no home video distribution.

FilmDoo has partnered with online film festivals, including UniFrance's MyFrenchFilmFestival.com and the ArteKino Festival, and over 50 distributors, including Peccadillo Pictures, Film Movement and Third Window Films. The platform has also compiled and distributed various short film compilations, including gay- and lesbian-themed compilations from the New Queer Visions festival strand.

FilmDoo has been elected secretary of EuroVoD, a network of European Video on Demand platforms specialising in art-house films and independent cinema.

Representatives of FilmDoo have spoken and presented at events hosted by various festivals and organisations, including the 77th Venice International Film Festival, 2018 Cannes Film Festival, Berlin's European Film Market, Trieste Film Festival, Thessaoniki International Film Festival, Odesa International Film Festival, the Copenhagen International Documentary Film Festival and European Audiovisual Entrepreneurs.

In recent years, the company has seen an expansion into online education, launching two video-based learning platforms in 2021, named FilmDoo Academy and FilmDoo Language Learning. Representatives of FilmDoo have since presented at edtech and education events organised by groups as the British Council in Indonesia and the Language Flagship in the United States.

== History ==
The platform was officially launched at the 2015 Cannes Film Festival. According to FilmDoo CEO and co-founder Weerada Sucharitkul, "The word 'Doo' in 'FilmDoo' means to watch or see in Thai, so FilmDoo means to watch a film in Thai." Sucharitkul reports that the name was originally suggested by her mother and that it was chosen "because [they] wanted a non-English word to really reflect the international element of the business from the very beginning."

Later that same year, FilmDoo was selected as a finalist for the 2015 MassChallenge accelerator program.

In July 2016, FilmDoo announced the launch of two new short film channels on new media network, Ownzones: FilmDoo Horror for international horror films; and FilmDoo Asian for Asian shorts, both of which are available internationally by subscription.

In the summer of 2016, FilmDoo also launched a crowdfunding campaign on Seedrs with the goal of raising £95,000. On 7 November 2016, the site reported to have raised "a total of approximately £235,000 (including investments off the platform)".

In 2017, FilmDoo were accepted for the French Tech Ticket, a one-year program funded by the French government to support startup companies from around the world.

That same year, FilmDoo received sponsorship from Creative Europe for a proposed "Multi-Language/Multi-Modal Automated Film Tagging Service." On 19 February 2018, the platform named Fassoo was presented at the European Film Market by Patrick Ndjiki-Nya and William Page as part of the EFM Startups event.

In 2018, FilmDoo were selected for the seventh edition of Concours d’Innovation Numérique, a French government grant scheme run by Bpifrance, in order to support the launch of their planned language learning platform, LanguageDoo.

In the summer of that same year, FilmDoo launched a channel on Amazon in the United States, where a selection of short films are available on a subscription basis. At the same time, the FilmDoo Aggregate program was launched as means of distributing films to other third party platforms, including Amazon.

At the 2020 North Europe edition of the Fusion International Film Festival, FilmDoo announced the launch of FilmDoo Services, a platform that provides film distributors, brands, distributors and film commissions with services and consultation in the fields of distribution and marketing. On October 28, 2020, FilmDoo CEO Weerada Sucharitkul received first prize in the UK & France round of She Loves Tech, the "world's largest startup pitch competition for women and technology." In December of the same year, FilmDoo was one of thirty companies selected for Barclays' and Techstars' Female Founders First, a programme that provides "trailblazing, female-led technology companies with resources to grow, scale, and advance."

In January 2021, supported by a grant from the MEDIA sub-programme of Creative Europe, FilmDoo launched FilmDoo Academy, an online learning platform that allowed users to create video-based quizzes using videos from YouTube and Vimeo. This was later followed by the launch of an additional platform, FilmDoo Language Learning, which allowed users pull from FilmDoo's own film catalogue to create online, video-based language lessons. In May, 2021, FilmDoo Academy was selected as one of the "Elite 200" education technology startups selected to compete in the GSV Cup pitch competition, held at the ASU+GSV Summit between August 9 and August 11. That same year, FilmDoo was selected for the Belgium-based Start it @KBC accelerator program, along with the 500 Startups Global Launch Singapore accelerator program, both of which supported the company's expansion into online learning and edtech.

From March to July, 2021, FilmDoo partnered with the Media & Learning Association in Belgium to conduct a pilot study on the former's edtech tool and platform. The study was moderated by Julia Schieber from the University of Erlangen–Nuremberg and funded by the Creative Europe MEDIA sub-programme.

In 2021, FilmDoo also launched a pilot of their online learning services with UK banks NatWest and the Royal Bank of Scotland, where FilmDoo's video-based learning tools were used to support corporate diversity and inclusion training.

== In the media ==
In May 2015, FilmDoo's acquisition of two new Indonesian titles and their new deal with distribution company Trinity were covered by Variety, with Asia Bureau Chief Patrick Frater writing that, with these new developments, "FilmDoo has bolstered its Asian credentials".

Similarly, in April 2016, FilmDoo received coverage from IndieWire for giving international releases to more than twenty "Vintage South African films" from distributors Retro Afrika Bioscope. In June that same year, Screen Daily published an article on the release of fourteen Southeast Asian films on FilmDoo.

FilmDoo's 2016 crowdfunding campaign on Seedrs received attention from several media outlets, including Screen Daily, Crowdfund Insider and VODzilla.

The company's acceptance into the French Tech Ticket programme was covered by French publication Les Échos.

On May 27, 2020, FilmDoo CEO Weerada Sucharitkul featured as a guest speaker on Fast Forward, a webcast run by consultancy The Catalysts.

On September 8, 2021, Sucharitkul featured as a guest on Money FM 89.3 show The Breakfast Huddle, where she discussed the company's expansion into online, video-based learning. That same year, Sucharitkul was selected for VOD Professional's list of 50 VOD Professionals 2021, a list of "the most influential people working in the UK’s OTT industry over the past 12 months."
