= Melissa Murray =

Melissa Murray could refer to:

- Melissa Murray (playwright) (born 1954), British dramatist and poet
- Melissa Murray (politician) (born 1974), member of the Rhode Island Senate
- Melissa Murray (academic) (born 1975), American legal scholar
- Melissa E. Murray (neuropathologist), researcher at the Mayo Clinic Florida
