= A Thousand Blows =

British historical drama series

- Promotional poster
- Genre: Historical drama; Crime drama
- Created by: Steven Knight
- Starring: Erin Doherty; Malachi Kirby; Francis Lovehall; James Nelson-Joyce; Jason Tobin; Darci Shaw; Hannah Walters; Morgan Hilaire; Caoilfhionn Dunne; Jemma Carlton; Nadia Albina; Tom Davis; Daniel Mays; Stephen Graham; Gary Lewis; Susan Lynch; Robert Glenister; Ned Dennehy; Catherine McCormack
- Composer: Federico Jusid
- Country of origin: United Kingdom
- Original language: English
- No. of series: 2
- No. of episodes: 12

Production
- Executive producers: Steven Knight; Kate Lewis; Damian Keogh; David Olusoga; Tinge Krishnan; Stephen Graham; Tom Miller; Sam Myer; Hannah Walters
- Cinematography: Milos Moore; Catherine Derry; Rasmus Arrildt
- Editors: Al Morrow; Jo Smyth; Peter Christelis; Carly Brown; Mark Davis; Daniel Lapira; Brin; Simone Nesti
- Running time: 43–56 minutes
- Production companies: The Story Collective; Matriarch Productions; Water & Power Productions

Original release
- Network: Disney+
- Release: 21 February 2025 – present

A Thousand Blows is a British historical drama series created by Steven Knight and based on the Forty Elephants, an all-female crime syndicate who clash with the world of illegal bare-knuckle boxing in 1880s London. The first series premiered on 21 February 2025 on Disney+ internationally and on Hulu in the United States. The second series premiered on 9 January 2026.

== Premise ==
Set in the East End of London in the 1880s, the series follows the Forty Elephants, an all-female crime syndicate led by Mary Carr that specializes in shoplifting and confidence tricks. They clash with Henry "Sugar" Goodson, the self-declared "emperor" of the East End's illegal bare-knuckle boxing world. Additionally, Hezekiah Moscow, a newly immigrated man from Jamaica with ambitions to become a lion tamer, and his best friend Alec Munroe, fight for survival as they come into contact with both groups.

== Cast and characters ==
=== Main ===
- Erin Doherty as Mary Carr
- Malachi Kirby as Hezekiah Moscow
  - Jair Ellis portrays young Hezekiah Moscow
- Francis Lovehall as Alec Munroe (series 1; guest series 2)
- James Nelson-Joyce as Edward "Treacle" Goodson
- Jason Tobin as Lao Lam
- Darci Shaw as Alice Diamond
- Hannah Walters as Eliza Moody
- Morgan Hilaire as Esme Long
- Caoilfhionn Dunne as Anne Glover
- Jemma Carlton as Belle Downer
- Nadia Albina as Verity Ross
- Tom Davis as Charlie Mitchell (series 1)
- Daniel Mays as William "Punch" Lewis
- Stephen Graham as Henry "Sugar" Goodson
- Gary Lewis as Jack MacAllen
- Susan Lynch as Jane Carr
- Robert Glenister as Indigo Jeremy
- Ned Dennehy as Bull Jeremy (series 2)
- Catherine McCormack as Sophie Lyons (series 2)

=== Supporting ===
- Ashley Walters as Switch (series 1)
- Elliot Warren as Sharkey Devenish (series 1)
- Eddie Toll as Saul Woolfe (series 1)
- Maeve Dermody as Lady Grace (series 1)
- James Harkness as Brenner
- Aliyah Odoffin as Victoria Davies
- Ziggy Heath as Peggy Bettinson (series 1)
- Adam Nagaitis as the Earl of Lonsdale (series 1)
- Ella Lily Hyland as Marianne Goodson
- Elsie Evans as Rose Goodson
- Will Bagnall as Thomas Goodson
- Kwong Loke as Li Hongzhang (series 1)
- Chike Chan as Lo Feng Lu (series 1)
- Tom Andrews as the Marquess of Queensberry (series 1)
- Tim Steed as Vance Murtagh
- Nathan Hubble as Buster Williams (series 1)
- Bryan Dick as Moses Jeremy (series 2)
- Alexandre Blazy as Charles Duval (series 2)
- Garry Cooper as Edward John Eyre (series 2)
- Richard Dillane as Frederic Leighton (series 2)
- Stanley Morgan as Prince Albert Victor (series 2)
- James Fisher as John Budgen (series 2)
- Anthony Howell as Lord Will Grafton (series 2)
- Ruaridh Mollica as Nicolas Grafton (series 2)
- CJ Beckford as Nathaniel Washington (series 2)
- Seth Somers as Quentin Ashmore (series 2)

== Episodes ==
Series	Episodes	Originally released
1	6	21 February 2025
2	6	9 January 2026

=== Series 1 (2025) ===
No. overall	No. in series	Title	Directed by	Written by	Original release date
1	1	"Episode 1"	Tinge Krishnan & Nick Murphy	Steven Knight	21 February 2025
2	2	"Episode 2"	Tinge Krishnan & Nick Murphy	Steven Knight	21 February 2025
3	3	"Episode 3"	Coky Giedroyc	Insook Chappell	21 February 2025
4	4	"Episode 4"	Ashley Walters	Harlan Davies	21 February 2025
5	5	"Episode 5"	Ashley Walters	Ameir Brown	21 February 2025
6	6	"Episode 6"	Ashley Walters	Yasmin Joseph	21 February 2025

=== Series 2 (2026) ===
No. overall	No. in series	Title	Directed by	Written by	Original release date
7	1	"Episode 1"	Katrin Gebbe	Steven Knight	9 January 2026
8	2	"Episode 2"	Katrin Gebbe	Steven Knight & Yasmin Joseph	9 January 2026
9	3	"Episode 3"	Katrin Gebbe	Harlan Davies	9 January 2026
10	4	"Episode 4"	Dionne Edwards	Insook Chappell	9 January 2026
11	5	"Episode 5"	Dionne Edwards	Ameir Brown	9 January 2026
12	6	"Episode 6"	Dionne Edwards	Yasmin Joseph	9 January 2026

== Production ==
The concept for the series was the brainchild of actress Hannah Walters, who pitched her idea to Steven Knight. In August 2022, it was revealed that a twelve episode boxing drama was in development, with Knight set as showrunner with Tinge Krishnan as lead director and an executive producer alongside Knight.

The series stars an ensemble cast which includes Erin Doherty, Malachi Kirby and Stephen Graham in lead roles while Francis Lovehall, James Nelson-Joyce, Jason Tobin, Hannah Walters, Morgan Hilaire, Caoilfhionn Dunne, Jemma Carlton, Nadia Albina, Tom Davis, Daniel Mays, Darci Shaw, Gary Lewis, Susan Lynch, and Robert Glenister round out the main cast.

Principal photography began in March 2023, with filming taking place in London. In February 2025, ahead of the series premiere, it was confirmed that a second series had been filmed.

== Release ==
A Thousand Blows was first shown at BFI London Film Festival on 11 October 2024. The first series premiered on 21 February 2025 on Disney+ internationally and on Hulu in the United States. The second series premiered on 9 January 2026.

== Reception ==
On the review aggregator website Rotten Tomatoes, 88% of 43 critics' reviews are positive, with an average rating of 7.7/10. The website's critical consensus reads, "Punching up an intriguing era of British history with creator Steven Knight's flare for genre grit, A Thousand Blows is riveting entertainment that leaves a bruise." Lucy Mangan of The Guardian awarded the first series five stars out of five, praising the depth of storytelling and themes.
