= On Killing =

Book by Dave Grossman

On Killing: The Psychological Cost of Learning to Kill in War and Society
- Author: Dave Grossman
- Publisher: Back Bay Books
- Publication date: 1996
- Pages: 400
- ISBN: 0-316-33000-0
- OCLC: 36544198
- Followed by: On Combat: The Psychology and Physiology of Deadly Conflict in War and in Peace

On Killing: The Psychological Cost of Learning to Kill in War and Society is a book by Dave Grossman exploring the psychology of the act of killing and the military law enforcement establishments attempt to understand and deal with the consequences of killing. The book is based on S.L.A. Marshall's theory that the majority of soldiers in war do not ever fire their weapons due to an innate resistance to killing.

== Overview ==
The book is based on S. L. A. Marshall's studies from World War II, which proposed that, contrary to popular perception, the majority of soldiers in war do not ever fire their weapons because of innate resistance to killing. Based on Marshall's studies, the military instituted training measures to break down this resistance, raising soldiers' firing rates to over 90 percent during the Vietnam War.

Grossman points out that there are great psychological costs that weigh heavily on the combat soldier or police officer who kill if they are not mentally prepared for what may happen; if their actions (killing) are not supported by their commanders and/or peers; and if they are unable to justify their actions (or if no one else justifies the actions for them).

The second edition of the book, along with an audio version, was released in 2009.

== The soldier's choice ==
Grossman writes in his book On Killing that soldiers are faced with four options once they have entered into combat.

1. Fight: As the name implies, this is the standard that defines the soldier's role as actively trying to defeat the enemy by use of their training.
2. Flight: This option involves the combatant fleeing the engagement.
3. Posture: This action involves the soldier falsely showing active participation in combat. In actuality they are not being effective in deterring the enemy from success. This is a major point of concern for commanders as it is difficult to tell the difference between a soldier posturing or fighting.
4. Submit: Submission to the enemy during an engagement is a direct act of surrender. In the animal kingdom, this is used by lesser combatants to avoid being injured upon ascertaining the futility of the battle.

== The problem of non- or miss-firing soldiers ==
S. L. A. Marshall did a study on the firing rates of soldiers in World War II. He found that the ratio of rounds fired vs. hits was low; he also noted that the majority of soldiers were not aiming to hit their targets. This is attributable to the inherent humanity inside the soldiers who grew up in a peaceful, equitable society. This was a problem for the US military and its allies during World War II. New training was developed and hit rates improved. The changes were small, but effective. First, instead of shooting at bull's-eye type targets, the United States Army switched to silhouette targets that mimic an average human. Training also switched from 300 yard slow fire testing to rapid fire testing with different time and distance intervals from 20 to 300 yards. With these two changes, hitting targets became a reaction that was almost automatic.

Some authors have discredited S.L.A. Marshall's book, stating that the book may be more of an idea of what was occurring and not a scientific study of what was happening. Other historians and journalists have outright accused Marshall of fabricating his study.

Another important factor that increased fire and hit rates is the development of camaraderie in training. Soldiers are taught that their actions do not only help or harm themselves, but the whole unit. This recurring theme in recollections collected from war veterans is the idea that they were not fighting for themselves at the time but more concerned for the people to their left and right. This ideology is ancient, recorded for example by Sun Tzu in his book The Art of War: "If those who are sent to draw water begin by drinking themselves, the army is suffering from thirst."

== Increase in PTSD since World War II ==
Some research indicates that the increased incidence of post-traumatic stress disorder (PTSD) in the military is related to the increase in firing rates. This brings up the classic debate of correlation vs. causation. Many believe that other factors have been influencing PTSD such as decompression time after conflicts, and the lack of moral sovereignty in engagements.

=== World War II and Vietnam ===
The Vietnam War, when compared to World War II, had markedly more anti-war demonstrations which showed the public's unwillingness to involve itself in Vietnam. Along with demonstrations at home, people who were sent to fight thought there was no reason for the war and so did not feel a moral obligation to fight. In contrast, many U.S. soldiers in World War II felt they were stopping an evil empire from conquering the globe. This helped the World War II troops' mettle to be steadfast.

Another problem with PTSD rates after World War II is the fact that there has been far less decompression time for the soldiers. During World War II, the main way back home was aboard ships, a trip that could take weeks. This time was spent with others who had had similar experiences and could understand the problems faced by others. During Vietnam soldiers were sent via draft to one year rotations by plane. Draftees arrived to their unit usually by themselves and were often shunned. This shunning was due to the senior members being afraid to befriend someone with a much higher chance of being killed than experienced combatants. Once the draftees' time in country was over they were sent back home by themselves. Travel may have been with other veterans but from a mix of units without enough familiarity to share hardships they had seen.

=== Modern engagements ===
In recent engagements such as the Persian Gulf War through the Iraq War and War in Afghanistan there is still a problem with a lack of decompression time. The training has improved so soldiers train and deploy with the people they will be fighting with. Many times, when they reach home, they are given time off. If one is in a reserve unit, they most likely go back to work and only see their fellow soldiers once a month. This lack of time to debrief and decompress can cause a feeling of isolation that only worsens the effects of PTSD. Grossman states in his book that everyone who experiences combat comes back with PTSD, the only question is to what extent their mind and psyche are damaged and how they cope with it.

== Claims ==
Grossman's theory, based on the World War II research of S. L. A. Marshall, is that most of the population deeply resists killing another human. Some veterans and historians have cast doubt on Marshall's research methodology. Professor Roger J. Spiller (deputy director of the Combat Studies Institute, US Army Command and General Staff College) argues in his 1988 article, "S.L.A. Marshall and the Ratio of Fire" (RUSI Journal, Winter 1988, pages 63–71), that Marshall had not actually conducted the research upon which he based his ratio-of-fire theory. "The 'systematic collection of data' appears to have been an invention." This revelation has called into question the authenticity of some of Marshall's other books and has lent academic weight to doubts about his integrity that had been raised in military circles even decades earlier.

As a result of Marshall's work, modern military training was modified to attempt to override this instinct, by:

- using man-shaped targets instead of bullseye targets in marksmanship practice
- practicing and drilling how soldiers would actually fight
- dispersing responsibility for the killing throughout the group
- displacing responsibility for the killing onto an authority figure, i.e., the commanding officer and the military hierarchy (see the Milgram experiment)

By the time of the United States involvement in the Vietnam War, says Grossman, 90% of U.S. soldiers would fire their weapons at other people.

He also says the act of killing is psychologically traumatic for the killer, even more so than constant danger or witnessing the death of others.

Grossman further argues that violence in television, movies and video games contributes to real-life violence by a similar process of training and desensitization.

In On Combat (Grossman's sequel to On Killing, based on ten years of additional research and interviews), he addresses the psychology and physiology of human aggression.

== Reception ==
Robert Engen, in a paper for the Canadian Military Journal critiquing On Killing, both praised and criticized Grossman's works, saying: "On Killing and On Combat form an excellent starting point, there are too many problems with their interpretation for them to be considered the final word on the subject." Grossman's response to Engen, printed in the same journal, addresses the criticisms by showing that S. L. A. Marshall's findings, even after having doubt cast on their methodology, have borne out in further scientific studies and real world experience and, furthermore, have been the cornerstone of military and police training for over a half century.

On Killing is on the United States Marine Corps' recommended reading list.

== Legacy ==
The series 3 Black Mirror episode, "Men Against Fire" (2016), was partly inspired by Men Against Fire: The Problem of Battle Command and On Killing, and explores the same themes.

== See also ==
- Killology
- Psychology of combat
