= Malachi Kirby =

British actor (born 1989)

- Occupations: Actor, writer
- Years active: 2007–present

Malachi Kirby (born September 20, 1989) is a British actor and writer. He gained prominence through his roles in the 2016 Roots remake and the Black Mirror episode "Men Against Fire". He won a BAFTA for his performance in Small Axe: Mangrove (2020). Kirby plays the lead role of Jamaican immigrant Hezekiah Moscow in the Victorian drama series A Thousand Blows.

== Early life ==
Kirby grew up an only child on the Patmore Estate in Battersea. His father died when he was 6. His parents were born in London where his grandparents had arrived from Jamaica. The cast of Roots were invited to take DNA tests, and Kirby's results came up as mostly West African with some South Asian and a small amount of European. He stated he hopes to do more specific research.

Kirby attended Salesian College, Battersea. Originally into literature, he discovered acting in year nine through a course at the Battersea Arts Centre. He studied at Richmond upon Thames College and was admitted to Identity School of Acting in 2007.

== Career ==
Kirby began his career in theatre, and describes himself as a theatre actor "at heart". He was shortlisted for Outstanding Newcomer at the 2011 Evening Standard Theatre Awards after appearing in a production of Mogadishu. He also appeared in a number of television shows and films, including a stint on EastEnders and the lead in the television film My Murder. He was named a Screen International Star of Tomorrow in 2013.

In 2016, Kirby starred as Kunta Kinte in the American miniseries Roots, a remake of the 1977 miniseries of the same name. His performance was well received by critics. That October, Kirby starred in an episode of the anthology series Black Mirror entitled "Men Against Fire", directed by Jakob Verbruggen.

He won the Rising Star and Male TV Performance awards at the 2016 and 2017 Screen Nation Film and Television Awards respectively. For Roots; he also received nominations at the 2017 Black Reel Awards and NAACP Image Awards.

Kirby went on to star as Michael Garwick in the 2019 Sky One dystopian drama Curfew and Oliver Harris in the Italian series Devils. He penned his first play Level Up, which premiered at the Bush Theatre in 2019.

Kirby landed the role of Darcus Howe in the "Mangrove" instalment of Steve McQueen's Small Axe anthology, which premiered in 2020. It was the first time he got to play an explicitly Caribbean character. For his performance, he won the 2021 British Academy Television Award for Best Supporting Actor.

In September 2021, it was announced Kirby would star opposite Delroy Lindo as both of Mr Nancy's sons Charlie and Spider in the Amazon Prime adaptation of Neil Gaiman's Anansi Boys.

In 2025, Kirby played the lead role of Hezekiah Moscow in Steven Knight's (creator of Peaky Blinders) British drama series A Thousand Blows, about organised crime and illegal bare-knuckle boxing in 1880s London. The first series premiered in February 2025, with Kirby reprising the role in a second series (filmed concurrently with the first series) released on 9 January 2026.

== Personal life ==
Kirby did not have a religious upbringing, but he turned to religion as an adult, and belongs to a Christian fellowship in East London.

== Filmography ==
†	Denotes works that have not yet been released

=== Film ===
Year	Title	Role	Notes
2009	Molly & Plum	Troublemaker	Short films
2009	Exhale	Chris	Short films
2012	My Brother the Devil	J-Boy	
2012	Checkpoint	Socrates	Short film
2012	Offender	Harry	
2013	Jonah	Juma	Short film
2013	Gone Too Far!	Yemi	
2014	The Last Showing	Clive	
2014	Kajaki	Snoop	
2015	Dough	Shaun	
2016	Fallen	Roland Sparks	
2019	A Place for You and Me		Short film
2021	Boiling Point	Tony	
2023	Wicked Little Letters	Bill	
2026	Project Hail Mary	Martin Dubois	

=== Television ===
Year	Title	Role	Notes
2008	Casualty	Group Leader	Episode: "Interventions"
2008	Silent Witness	Tic-Toc	2 episodes
2009	The Bill	Michael Clark	Episode: "Back to School"
2011	Doctors	Tony Coe	Episode: "Decent People"
2012	My Murder	Danny McLean	Television film
2013	Way to Go	Nkanta	2 episodes
2013	Lawless	Tyler Repton	Television film
2014	EastEnders	Wayne Ladlow	8 episodes
2014	BBC Comedy Feeds	DJ Dee Danger	Episode: "Vodka Diaries"
2015	Doctor Who	Gastron	Episode: "Hell Bent"
2015	Jekyll and Hyde	Spring Heeled Jack Burton	Miniseries; 2 episodes
2016	Roots	Kunta Kinte	Miniseries
2016	Black Mirror	Stripe	Episode: "Men Against Fire"
2017	The Machine	Aaron	Television film
2019	Curfew	Michael Garwick	Main role
2020	Devils	Oliver Harris	Main role
2020	Small Axe	Darcus Howe	Miniseries; episode: "Mangrove"
2022	My Name is Leon	Tufty Burrows	Television film
2025–2026	A Thousand Blows	Hezekiah Moscow	Main role
TBA	Anansi Boys †	Charlie / Spider	Main role; upcoming

=== Video games ===
Year	Title	Role	Notes
TBA	Squadron 42 †	Joachim Steiger	Upcoming

== Awards and nominations ==
Year	Award	Category	Nominated work	Result	Ref.
2011	Evening Standard Theatre Awards	Outstanding Newcomer	Mogadishu	Nominated	
2016	Screen Nation Film and Television Awards	Rising Star	Jekyll & Hyde, Dough	Won	
2017	Screen Nation Film and Television Awards	Male Performance in TV	Roots	Won	
2017	Black Reel Awards	Outstanding Actor, TV Movie or Limited Series	Roots	Nominated	
2017	NAACP Image Awards	Outstanding Actor in a Television Movie, Mini-Series or Dramatic Special	Roots	Nominated	
2021	British Academy Television Awards	Best Supporting Actor	Small Axe	Won	
