= Alec Munroe =

British Boxer of West Indian origin

- Born: Alexander Hayes Munroe c. 1850 or c. 1851; Jamaica
- Died: 8 September 1885 (aged approx. 34–35); London Hospital, Whitechapel, London, England
- Cause of death: Stab wound to the abdomen (peritonitis)
- Resting place: Manor Park Cemetery in Ilford
- Other name: Aleck Munroe
- Occupations: Mariner; bareknuckle boxer
- Years active: 1870s – 1885

Alexander Hayes Munroe (c. 1850 - 8 September 1885), whose contemporaries also referred to him as Alec Munroe, was a British boxer of West Indian origins who competed in East London during the late 19th century. He worked as a prize-fighter, and according to accounts published in contemporary newspapers, a lion tamer much like his Jamaican friend Hezekiah Moscow.

== Early life and career ==
Alexander Hayes Munroe's birthplace is uncertain, but he was reportedly born in Kingston, Jamaica, or Kingstown, Saint Vincent. Munroe competed in boxing matches in London's East End from at least 1880 and became known in the city's boxing circles, under the Marquess of Queensberry Rules. Munroe was also friends with boxer Hezekiah Moscow, and the two reportedly took part in a foot race in January 1883.

Munroe is recorded in the 1880 census as a mariner, lodging at the George Inn on the High Street in Rochester, Kent.

== Death and funeral ==
On the night of 4 September 1885, Munroe was stabbed at a common lodging house at 6 Little Pearl Street, Spitalfields, London. According to witness Henry Cook, Munroe returned to the house around midnight while drunk and entered the kitchen, where Thomas Ewington, also known as Hewington, was cutting tobacco. Cook heard Munroe insult those present and later saw him staggering with a wound on his right side, just below the ribs. Another witness, Richard Butler, said Munroe initially refused to go to hospital because he thought the wound was only a scratch. He was later taken to the London Hospital, where he died. During a post-mortem examination, hospital surgeon Walter Blakston found a wound in the small intestine. He testified that fluid from the wound caused inflammation, which led to Munroe's death.

At the inquest, Munroe was described as a pugilist and "a man of colour", aged about 35. Police initially arrested labourer Thomas McCarthy on suspicion of manslaughter, but witnesses indicated that he was not the attacker, and he was discharged. Police subsequently arrested Ewington, who admitted stabbing Munroe during the altercation. The jury returned a verdict of manslaughter against him.

Munroe's funeral, held on 13 September 1885, drew a large public response; contemporary newspapers in London and Kent reported that as many as 20,000 people lined the streets of the East End to watch the procession, and the </Norwood News described him as "a great favourite with everyone in the neighbourhood". He was buried in cemetery in the Ilford area.
