= Maxine (TV series) =

British TV series

- Genre: Crime drama
- Written by: Simon Tyrrell
- Directed by: Laura Way
- Starring: Jemma Carlton; Scott Reid
- Country of origin: United Kingdom
- Original language: English
- No. of series: 1
- No. of episodes: 3

Production
- Producers: Emma Foley; Tamryn Reinecke
- Production company: Clapperboard Studios

Original release
- Network: Channel 5
- Release: 10 October – 12 October 2022

Maxine is a British three-part television drama miniseries, based on the story of Maxine Carr's involvement in the 2002 Soham murders, where 10-year-olds Holly Wells and Jessica Chapman were killed by Carr's boyfriend Ian Huntley. It was first broadcast in the United Kingdom on Channel 5 in October 2022.

== Cast ==
The series features Jemma Carlton, in her first television role, as Maxine Carr, and Scott Reid as Ian Huntley. Other cast members include Steve Edge, Barry John Kinsella, Shane Nestor and Kate O'Toole.

== Critical reception ==
The series was received poorly by critics, with a review by Lucy Mangan in The Guardian describing it as "a show about the Soham murders that is both pointless and dangerous", while The Independent quoted a viewer as labelling it as being in "absurdly bad taste". According to the Daily Mirror, "several Channel 5 viewers found it hard to stomach, particularly as they claimed that the drama seemed to be portraying Carr as a 'victim'". Channel 5 defended the decision to produce the series, with director of programmes Ben Frow being quoted as saying "it's not about the murders, it's about a woman who came from a very challenging upbringing" and "I think we have been deeply respectful to the victims, whilst shining a light on some very challenging issues".
