= Leo Frankowski =

American science fiction novelist (1943–2008)

- Born: February 13, 1943; Detroit, Michigan, U.S.
- Died: December 25, 2008 (aged 65); Lake Elsinore, California, U.S.

Leo Frankowski (February 13, 1943 – December 25, 2008) was a Polish-American writer of science fiction novels.

== Life ==
Frankowski was born in Detroit, Michigan to parents of Polish (Kashubian) descent. His family run an inn in the city. Prior to his writing career, he was a successful engineer. He owned and operated Sterling Manufacturing and Design, located in Utica, Michigan, which (among other things) designed pneumatic and hydraulic systems for Chrysler. Leo held multiple patents, including his most popular item, Formital, a stamped aluminum product for use as a base for plastic auto body filler. Formital was carried exclusively for many years by the Pep Boys chain of auto parts stores.

Frankowski lived in Russia for four years with his wife and adopted teenage daughter. However, at the time of his death, he had separated from them and had moved back to the United States. Frankowski died in Lake Elsinore, California.

== Writings ==
Though he had tinkered with short science fiction for several years, Leo's writing career began in earnest in the early 1980s when he was invited to join what became the National Science Fiction Writer's Exchange, a now-defunct Detroit-area group founded by Guy Snyder, and whose membership included Lloyd Biggle, Ted Reynolds and future published author Ann Tonsor Zeddies. Members read manuscripts aloud, which were then critiqued; from the beginning, Leo's stories related to time travel were well received by the membership. Most of these meetings were audio-taped, and those tapes were retained by Snyder.

Encouraged by the positive responses, Leo quickly wrote his first novel, initially titled The Polish Engineer. The book landed at Del Rey Books, and the publisher offered him a multi-book contract. Retitled The Cross Time Engineer, it became the first book in his Conrad Stargard series, in which his Polish background is particularly evident.

Two other series were written partially in collaboration with Dave Grossman; alone, he also wrote the stand-alone novels Fata Morgana and Copernick's Rebellion.

Frankowski's most recent work again featured Conrad Stargard. He wrote Lord Conrad's Crusade in collaboration with Rodger Olsen, which his then-publisher Baen rejected 'for "bad writing" (an explanation Frankowski doubted). Baen also terminated its contracts for other upcoming titles. Frankowski published the novel himself, and promised another Stargard book which would conclude the series. His death apparently precluded completion of this volume.

His Kasubian-themed military science fiction series New Kashubia was noticed in the Polish Kashubian regional press. The book and the series were positively reviewed by Kashubian writers and critics (Roman Drzeżdżon and Grzegorz Jarosław Schramke).

== Political views ==
Frankowski stated that most of his fans were "males with military and technical backgrounds," and that his detractors were "mostly Feminists, Liberals, and Homosexuals." Frankowski admitted that anyone who self-identifies with the latter categories would be unlikely to enjoy his fiction.

In the preface to the 1990 Lord Conrad's Lady, Frankowski remarked: "Any overt sexism and male chauvinism noticed in this work is totally the fault of Bill Gillmore, and all complaints should be addressed to him at the Dawn Treader Bookshop of Ann Arbor, Mich."

== Bibliography ==
=== Conrad Stargard series ===
In the Conrad Stargard series, a twentieth-century Polish engineer travels back in time to thirteenth-century Poland, where he introduces modern technology, defeats and annihilates historic enemies of Poland and makes Poland the dominant European power for centuries to come. It consists of the following books (Rubber and Time Machine feature the same setting and some of the same characters, but are not 'main sequence' books):

- The Cross-Time Engineer (1986)
- The High-Tech Knight (1989)
- The Radiant Warrior (1989)
- The Flying Warlord (1989)
- Lord Conrad's Lady (1990)
- Conrad's Quest for Rubber (1998):
- Conrad's Time Machine (2002)
- Lord Conrad's Crusade (2005)
- Conrad's Last Campaign (2014)

=== New Kashubia ===
- A Boy and His Tank (1999)
- The War with Earth (2003) (with Dave Grossman)
- Kren of the Mitchegai (2004) (with Dave Grossman)

=== Two-Space ===
- The Two-Space War (2004) (with Dave Grossman)

This series was continued by Grossman in collaboration with Bob Hudson with The Guns of Two-Space (2007)

=== Stand-alone novels ===
- Copernick's Rebellion (1987)
- Fata Morgana (1999) (ISBN 0-671-57876-6)
