= Verity Bargate Award =

The Verity Bargate Award is a biennial British theatre award for new writing. It was established in 1981–82 in memory of Verity Bargate, the co-founder of Soho Poly, precursor to Soho Theatre.

It is open to writers based in the United Kingdom and Ireland and it is recognised as one of the oldest and most prestigious playwriting prizes of its kind. Since its formation it has been an important springboard for the careers of some of Britain's most established playwrights and screenwriters.

As of 2024, the winning playwright receives £8,000 for an exclusive option for Soho Theatre to produce the prize-winning play. Their play is guaranteed a full London run on one of their stages alongside workshops and rehearsed readings of the play in India and USA as part of the theatre's wider international programme in these locations.

== History ==
The Verity Bargate Award was established by Soho Theatre to support emerging playwrights and to identify new writing for production. Named after Soho Theatre’s former artistic director Verity Bargate, the award is presented for an outstanding new stage play.

In the early years of the prize, notable plays that won the award included: Shona by Tony Craze (1983), Killing the Cat by David Spencer (1990), Kindertransport by Diane Samuels (1992), Jump Mr Manlinoff, Jump by Toby Whithouse (1998). More recent winners have been A Night at the Dogs by Matt Charman (2004), The One by Vicky Jones (2013) and Shedding a Skin by Amanda Wilkin (2020).

In 2024, for the first time in the award’s history, the winning play received rehearsed readings in New York and Mumbai. In the same year Boys On The Verge Of Tears by Sam Grabiner became the first winner of the Award to win the Olivier Award for Outstanding Achievement in an Affiliate Theatre.

== Judges ==
Previous judges include Phoebe Waller-Bridge, Laura Wade, James Graham, Theresa Ikoko, Morgan Lloyd Malcolm (all former Soho Theatre playwrights), Lolita Chakrabarti, Russell T Davies, April De Angelis, Sue Townsend, Emma Rice, Irving Wardle, Meera Syal and Ikenna Obiekwe. Since 2014, award has been chaired by film and television producer, Character 7's Stephen Garrett (producer), who sponsor the Award.

== Past Winners ==
Verity Bargate Award
Year	Play	Playwright
1983	Shona	Tony Craze (joint winner)
1983	Lunch Girls	Ron Hart (joint winner)
1983	The Shelter	Johnnie Quarrel (runner-up)
1984	Up For None	Mick Mahoney (joint winner)
1984	Coming Apart	Melissa Murray (joint winner)
1985	The Bombdies	Julie Dennis
1986	Releevo	David Spencer (joint winner)
1986	Made in Spain	Tony Grounds (joint winner)
1986	Smith	Johnnie Quarrell (runner-up)
1987	James Bonney MP	Ian Buckley (shortlist)
1988	Me and My Friend	Gillian Plowman (winner)
1988	Here is Monster	Brock Norman Brock (runner- up)
1989	Dogs! Sons of Dogs!	Michele Celeste
1990	Killing the Cat	David Spencer
1991	Water Music	Lyndon Morgans
1992	Kindertransport	Diane Samuels
1994	Bruises & The Shore Watcher's House	Judy Upton
1996	The Backroom	Adrian Pagan (joint winner)
1996	Perpetua	Fraser Grace (joint winner)
1998	Jump Mr Malinoff, Jump	Toby Whithouse
2001	Office	Shan Khan
2004	A Night At The Dogs	Matt Charman (joint winner)
2004	Felt Effects	Joy Wilkinson (joint winner)
2007	This Isn't Romance	Insook Chappell
2011	Pastoral	Thomas Eccleshare
2013	The One	Vicky Jones
2015	Roller Diner	Stephen Jackson
2017	City Song	Carys Coburn
2020	Shedding A Skin	Amanda Wilkin
2022	Boys on the Verge of Tears	Sam Grabiner
2024	Little Brother	Eoin McAndrew

== Workshops ==
Ahead of each submission window, Soho Theatre travel to venues across the United Kingdom and Ireland, to bring new-writing workshops to emerging playwrights. These workshops are designed to equip participants with the tools and inspiration to write a new play, encouraging first time writers to take their first steps in playwriting.
