= Jemma Carlton =

English actress

- Born: Jemma Lauren Carlton
- Education: Rose Bruford College
- Years active: 2020–present

Jemma Carlton is an English actress. She made her screen debut in the titular role of the Channel 5 and Netflix true crime drama Maxine (2022). She has since appeared in The Cleaner for BBC (2023), as Cathy Swire alongside Colin Firth in the Sky Atlantic series Lockerbie: A Search for Truth (2025), and Belle Downer in the Disney Plus series A Thousand Blows (2025).

== Early life ==
Carlton grew up in Stafford. She graduated from Rose Bruford College with a Bachelor of Arts (BA) in Acting. She was runner up for the 2019 Alan Bates Award, an accolade given to promising graduating actors.

== Career ==
=== Stage ===
Her professional stage debut was in The Silver Cord by Sidney Howard at The Finborough Theatre (2024).

=== Screen ===
She made her screen debut as Maxine Carr in Channel 5 series Maxine in 2022. In 2023, she appeared in the second series of Greg Davies comedy series The Cleaner on BBC One.

In early 2025, she could be seen appearing alongside Colin Firth in British historical drama Lockerbie: A Search for Truth. She plays series regular Belle Downer in Steven Knight historical drama A Thousand Blows.

== Filmography ==
Key
†	Denotes works that have not yet been released

=== Television ===
Year	Title	Role	Notes
2022	Maxine	Maxine Carr	Lead role
2023	The Cleaner	Selina	1 episode
2025	Lockerbie: A Search for Truth	Cathy Swire	5 episodes
2025	A Thousand Blows	Belle Downer	6 episodes
