= The Adventures of Conrad Stargard =

Fictional character

The Adventures of Conrad Stargard is a series of time travel novels written by the Polish American writer Leo Frankowski. In them, a Polish engineer named Conrad Schwartz is sent back in time to the 13th century where he has to establish himself and cope with various crises including the eventual Mongol invasion of Poland in 1240.

== Main character ==
The character of Conrad Stargard has at times been described as a Mary Sue, and some aspects of the novels can be looked at as authorial wish-fulfillment. In response to this criticism in an early draft of the first book, Frankowski modified the character to have the opposite traits as himself, such as Conrad's socialism and devout Catholicism.

== Series ==
The series originally consisted of four books, with a fifth released shortly after to wrap up loose ends:

- The Cross-Time Engineer
- The High-Tech Knight
- The Radiant Warrior
- The Flying Warlord
- Lord Conrad's Lady

All of the original books were originally published by Del Rey Books, and released by Baen Books in later runs.

In late 2005, Frankowski self-published Lord Conrad's Crusade after a dispute with Baen. The final book in the series, Conrad's Last Campaign, was published in 2014—eight years after the author's death. Those two books were co-authored with Rodger Olsen.

Frankowski also wrote two books set in the same universe as the original series but not featuring the main character Conrad:

- Conrad's Quest for Rubber
- Conrad's Time Machine

Two omnibus editions of this series have been published by Baen Books:

- Conrad Stargard: Radiant Warrior (2004)

Contains The Cross-time Engineer, The High Tech Knight and The Radiant Warrior.

- Conrad's Lady (2005)

Contains The Flying Warlord, Lord Conrad's Lady and Conrad's Quest for Rubber.

Four additional Conrad Stargard Novels were roughly outlined/rough drafted, with notes and brainstorming ideas, but were never finished or published due to the author's death. Additionally, there was to be a separate tie-in with Leo's first novel Copernick's Rebellion to the "Adventures of Conrad Stargard".

== Plot summary ==
During the series Conrad Stargard, a Polish engineer, travels through time to 1231 Poland. Using his knowledge of future events and technology, Stargard creates a new timeline in which a technologically advanced Poland becomes the dominant power in thirteenth-century Europe and Stargard himself is the most powerful man in Poland (though he chooses not to dethrone the King).

=== The Cross-Time Engineer ===
The main character Conrad Stargard is a Polish engineer from the year 1986. After getting drunk and falling asleep in a time machine, he is transported back in time to thirteenth-century Poland, the year 1231. Conrad, familiar with Poland's history, knows that in 10 years the Mongols will arrive and kill most of the population of Europe. After befriending a local monk, Father Ignacy, who convinces him he is indeed in an earlier era, and a failed attempt at becoming a scribe, he takes a job as a bodyguard to a merchant. He meets a number of minor characters who figure in later books, such as the boatman Tadaos, and winds up working for Count Lambert, a relative of the Duke who rules over much of Poland. Due to his skill at arms and mercy in saving the infant of bandits he had slain, he impresses the local count, Count Lambert. It is discovered at this point that Conrad's "amazing warhorse" and "superb weapons" were all planted by his distant cousin who invented the time-machines and wished to help Conrad. However, due to causality, Conrad cannot be simply removed from the past, but he can be "assisted". After improving Count Lambert's industrial base by building a cloth factory and multipurpose windmill, Conrad is eventually granted land on which he can build his industrial base to defend Poland.

=== The High-Tech Knight ===
Conrad, now using the name Stargard because his correct name sounds too German, works to bring Poland into some advanced technology in order to meet the imminent threat of the 1241 Mongol invasion. This book details the travails that occur as Conrad attempts to establish the industrial base that he will need for his planned defense of Poland. He also establishes the thirteenth century equivalent to the Playboy Club, builds a new city, gains several new lovers and elevates his status in the ruling hierarchy of the country.

=== The Radiant Warrior ===
The third book deals with Conrad's establishment of an official Polish army using 20th century training techniques he learned during his service as an officer in the Polish Air Force. Conrad creates an army of 150,000 highly trained soldiers, while Twentieth Century techniques disturb Thirteenth Century society. By the end of the book, he has been elevated from knight to baron.

=== The Flying Warlord ===
This book covers the four years prior to Mongol invasion. Conrad begins a relationship with Countess Francine, the French-born paramour of the murdered Duke Henryk. He establishes a riverboat navy and an air force. Lambert tries to force Conrad to marry his daughter, threatening to strip him of his lands and title if he refuses. Disgusted, Conrad decides to leave Poland and travel alone to France. He stops to visit Francine, who convinces him to marry her and resume his position. After the wedding, a council of war is called by young Duke Henryk (son of the murdered duke). Count Conrad disagrees with the duke's battle plans, as they would require him to abandon his own lands and withdraw west to Legnica, where his infantry could not maneuver effectively without the steamboats and railroads he built. Other lords of Poland's eastern lands are likewise opposed the duke's idea, but to disobey would be high treason. Conrad ends up fighting the war by himself. After returning to the Warriors' School to finish preparations for the war, he enlists the aid of Count Lambert, the commander of Eagle Nest where they have created scout aircraft, in his treason. Lambert readily agrees, believing Conrad to be answering to a higher authority. Count Lambert forces Conrad to divert his efforts into creating an air force. The Mongols invade, with tens of thousands dead on all sides. The war starts with the battle of the Vistula and finishes with the slaughter of the Mongols at the battle of Sandomierz, apparently ending the war and also ending the book.

=== Lord Conrad's Lady ===
The fifth book serves to tie up loose ends from The Flying Warlord. Conrad has successfully defeated the Mongols, but must now piece together the various parts of Poland. Although he keeps refining his technological advances, the majority of his time is spent establishing Poland as the primary social, economic, technological and military country of the region (and soon to be the world). Political intrigue abounds as various factions (including his wife) try to chart the best course for Poland. Lady Francine, a French woman known as one of the two most beautiful women in Poland (the other lives with Conrad, but as an heretical Muslim can't or won't marry him) maneuvers Conrad into marrying her.

=== Conrad's Quest for Rubber ===
A story about a group of soldiers known as the "Explorer Corps" and their mission to the Americas. Conrad sends an expedition to South America, with disastrous effects due to unique diseases. This book is from the point of view of a new character Josip Sobieski. Josip is a young man enrolled with Conrad's "Explorer Corps" whose purpose is to explore new lands in order to find new materials for Conrad's modernization of Europe (mainly rubber). This book primarily revolves around Josip's explorations in both the Arctic Circle and the Amazon River.

=== Conrad's Time Machine ===
Prequel to the series loosely gives the story of how the time machine was invented and used. Conrad does not appear in this. A novel about Conrad's cousin's, and his associates, invention of the time machine that stranded Conrad in the 13th century. This book explains the invention of the time machine and the people who control its use, incidentally providing explanations for their occasional interference in Conrad's behalf. Note: A sequel was planned and rough-outlined in 2005 (Not yet published)

=== Lord Conrad's Crusade ===
Conrad goes on vacation, ends up shipwrecked in north Africa and enslaved. He discovers his uncle did more of a tune-up than believed when he got his "physical" and his Christian Army uses his disappearance as an excuse to invade Africa and eventually the Holy Lands and find him.

=== Conrad's Last Campaign ===
Frankowski's posthumously published finale to the Conrad Stargard series. The Mongols are overdue, so Conrad takes the war to them.

== Reception ==
Jan Murphy of the San Francisco Examiner praised The Cross-Time Engineer, comparing the character of Stargard to George MacDonald Fraser's character Harry Flashman. The series has also received reviews from Booklist, Publishers Weekly, and Library Journal.

In 2005 Frankowski mentioned the series was of interest to unspecified people from Hollywood.
