= Scott Reid (actor) =

Scottish actor

Scott Reid is a Scottish actor. His roles include Methadone Mick in Still Game (2016–2019), Michael Farmer in Line of Duty (2017), and Ian Huntley in Maxine (2022).

== Early life and education ==
Reid grew up in Paisley in Renfrewshire. He began acting at age six at the PACE Theatre Company. He played football on the same Saturdays as acting, until he failed a trial for local team St Mirren as a teenager; he then committed himself to acting, considering it a more likely career opportunity.

Reid attended Paisley Grammar School and the Royal Conservatoire of Scotland, and began acting in Scottish theatre. He relocated to London to advance his career, but experienced financial problems. He struck a deal with his parents to finance him for six months, during which he got his first role in a Hewlett-Packard advertisement and was then able to pay his rent and reimburse his parents.

== Career ==
Reid was acting in The Choir at Glasgow's Citizens Theatre, as a character he described as a "Ned". Greg Hemphill, co-creator of BBC sitcom Still Game, saw the performance and requested Reid to audition at his home for the role of the character Methadone Mick. Reid, whose father worked with vulnerable people including methadone users, criticised press coverage that accused the character of mocking drug addiction. In January 2022, a mural of Reid as Methadone Mick was painted in Glasgow.

In 2017, Reid appeared in Line of Duty and as Christopher Boone in a Royal National Theatre production of The Curious Incident of the Dog in the Night-Time at Edinburgh Festival Theatre. On Line of Duty, he played Michael Farmer, a sex offender with learning difficulties. He based the character on a comment he had heard from his mother from her experience as a foster parent, that children who do not experience love by the age of three will not feel love for their parents. In the same year, he was a nominee at the Young Scot Awards.

Reid played Quill in Amazon Prime Video's fantasy series Carnival Row from 2019 to 2023, and DC Mick Clark on ITV's White House Farm in 2020. He portrayed Ian Huntley, perpetrator of the 2002 Soham murders, in Channel 5 drama Maxine in 2022. He later had roles as Billy McCloud in BBC drama Nightsleeper (2024), and Constable Lestrade on Amazon's Young Sherlock from 2026.

== Personal life ==
In 2021, Reid was a witness at the trial of fellow Scottish actor Kevin Guthrie. Guthrie was convicted of sexually assaulting a woman at Reid's home, and was sentenced to three years in prison.

== See also ==
- List of actors who have played Inspector Lestrade
