= Insook Chappell =

British-Korean playwright and screenwriter

- Born: South Korea
- Occupation: Playwright

Insook Chappell is a British playwright and screenwriter of Korean descent. Her debut play, This Isn't Romance, won the Verity Bargate Award, and she has had several plays produced in both the UK and Korea.

== Early life and education ==
Chappell was born in South Korea but raised in England. She studied dance in New York at the Alvin Ailey School before moving into acting.

== Career ==
Chappell started writing between acting jobs, initially for the stage. Her first play, This Isn't Romance, won the Verity Bargate Award and was produced at the Soho Theatre. It was later translated and produced at the National Theatre Company of Korea. Her play P'Yongyang was shortlisted for the Bruntwood Prize and produced at the Finborough Theatre to critical acclaim. It was also translated and produced at the Modu Art Theatre in Seoul. Other plays include Tales of the Harrow Road at Soho Theatre and Mountains: the Dreams of Lily Kwok at the Royal Exchange Theatre. Her play The Free9, written for the National Theatre Connections programme, is studied in British schools for the GCSE Drama curriculum.

More recently, Chappell has written for television. She wrote two episodes of the historical drama series A Thousand Blows for Disney+, the first season of which was released in 2025.She is currently developing several of her own projects for television and film, and writing an episode of the upcoming Apple TV series The Husbands.
