= Jakob Verbruggen =

Belgian television and film director (born 1980)

- Born: 1980 (age 45–46); Merksem, Belgium
- Education: RITCS
- Known for: Film & television director
- Notable work: House of Cards, Black Mirror: "Men Against Fire", The Alienist
- Awards: Joseph Plateau Award; 2002

Jakob Verbruggen (born in Merksem in 1980) is a Belgian television and film director. He studied at the Royal Institute for Theatre, Cinema and Sound (RITCS) in Belgium.

== Career ==
He has directed episodes of The Fall, London Spy, and House of Cards. In 2016 he directed "Men Against Fire", an episode of the third series of the anthology series Black Mirror. In 2017 he directed the first three episodes of the event series The Alienist. Deadline revealed in August 2020 that Verbruggen joined as director and executive producer of Invasion.

== Filmography ==
Year	Title	Episode(s)
2013	The Fall	"Dark Descent"
2013	The Fall	"Darkness Visible"
2013	The Fall	"Insolence & Wine"
2013	The Fall	"My Adventurous Song"
2013	The Fall	"The Vast Abyss"
2015	London Spy	"Episode One"
2015	London Spy	"Episode Two"
2015	London Spy	"Episode Three"
2015	London Spy	"Episode Four"
2015	London Spy	"Episode Five"
2016	House of Cards	"Chapter 51"
2016	House of Cards	"Chapter 52"
2016	Black Mirror	"Men Against Fire"
2018	The Alienist	"The Boy on the Bridge"
2018	The Alienist	"A Fruitful Partnership"
2018	The Alienist	"Silver Smile"
2019	The Twilight Zone	"Six Degrees of Freedom"
2021	Invasion	"Crash"
2021	Invasion	"The Last Day"
2021	Invasion	"Full of Stars"
2021	Invasion	"First Day"
2024	Dark Matter	"Are You Happy in Your Life?"
2024	Dark Matter	"Trip of a Lifetime"
2024	Dark Matter	"The Box"
