= Melissa E. Murray (neuropathologist) =

American neuroscientist

- Education: Mayo Clinic, Mayo Graduate School, College of Medicine
- Scientific career
- Thesis: Cerebral white matter hyperintensities : a synthesis of their clinico-radiologic and neuropathologic correlates in the non-demented elderly (2010)

Melissa E. Murray is an American translational neuroscientist and Professor of Neuroscience at Mayo Clinic Florida.

== Education and career ==
Murray graduated from the University of North Florida in 2002. She completed her Ph.D. at Mayo Clinic College of Medicine in 2010, where she studied the aging brain outside the context of neurodegeneration. After completing her Ph.D., Murray began her postdoctoral fellowship at Mayo Clinic with a focus on neuropathology, neuroimaging, and genetics. She was promoted to assistant professor of neuroscience in 2013, with a promotion to full professor in 2023.

== Research ==
Murray specializes in the study of neurodegeneration, particularly relating to Alzheimer's disease and related dementias with an emphasis on young-onset Alzheimer's disease. Her research uses digital pathology to quantify disease severity and brain health in Alzheimer's disease and related dementias. She first became interested in researching dementia and Alzheimer's after her grandmother was diagnosed with dementia.

She designed an algorithm to subtype Alzheimer's disease based on topographic distribution of tangles, leading to the uncovering of neuropathologic influence on syndromic heterogeneity. She has demonstrated how research-based clinical cutpoints of amyloid-PET imaging corresponded to underlying neuropathology, and used digital pathology as a deep phenotyping approach to reveal novel protein-coding genes implicated in selective vulnerability observed in Alzheimer's disease. Her work on relationship between plasma phosphorylated tau (p-tau) levels and Alzheimer's disease biomarker changes showed that global neuropathologic scales of tau and amyloid-β, as well as the vulnerability of the locus coeruleus, were associated with plasma p-tau levels. Her research is of interest to the broader public because she has shown that Alzheimer diagnoses in men are missed more often than in women and has connected dreams with later diagnoses of dementia.

== Selected publications ==
- Murray, Melissa E.; Senjem, Matthew L.; Petersen, Ronald C.; Hollman, John H.; Preboske, Greg M.; Weigand, Stephen D.; Knopman, David S.; Ferman, Tanis J.; Dickson, Dennis W.; Jack, Clifford R. (2010-11-01). "Functional Impact of White Matter Hyperintensities in Cognitively Normal Elderly Subjects". Archives of Neurology. 67 (11). doi:10.1001/archneurol.2010.280. ISSN 0003-9942. PMC 3025610. PMID 21060015.
- Murray, Melissa E.; Graff-Radford, Neill R.; Ross, Owen A.; Petersen, Ronald C.; Duara, Ranjan; Dickson, Dennis W. (2011-09-01). "Neuropathologically defined subtypes of Alzheimer's disease with distinct clinical characteristics: a retrospective study". The Lancet Neurology. 10 (9): 785–796. doi:10.1016/S1474-4422(11)70156-9. ISSN 1474-4422. PMC 3175379. PMID 21802369.
- Whitwell, Jennifer L.; Dickson, Dennis W.; Murray, Melissa E.; Weigand, Stephen D.; Tosakulwong, Nirubol; Senjem, Matthew L.; Knopman, David S.; Boeve, Bradley F.; Parisi, Joseph E.; Petersen, Ronald C.; Jack, Clifford R.; Josephs, Keith A. (2012-10-01). "Neuroimaging correlates of pathologically defined subtypes of Alzheimer's disease: a case-control study". The Lancet Neurology. 11 (10): 868–877. doi:10.1016/S1474-4422(12)70200-4. ISSN 1474-4422. PMC 3490201. PMID 22951070.

== Honors and awards ==
In 2016, Murray received the Alzheimer's Association de Leon Prize in Neuroimaging award and was named New Investigator of 2016. In 2022 she was awarded the Mayo Clinic 2022 Florida Investigator of the Year.
