= Melissa Murray (playwright) =

British poet and playwright (born 1954)

Melissa Murray (born 1954) is a British poet and playwright.

She is a recipient of the Eric Gregory Award and the Verity Bargate Award.
