= Hezekiah Moscow =

British Boxer of West Indian origin

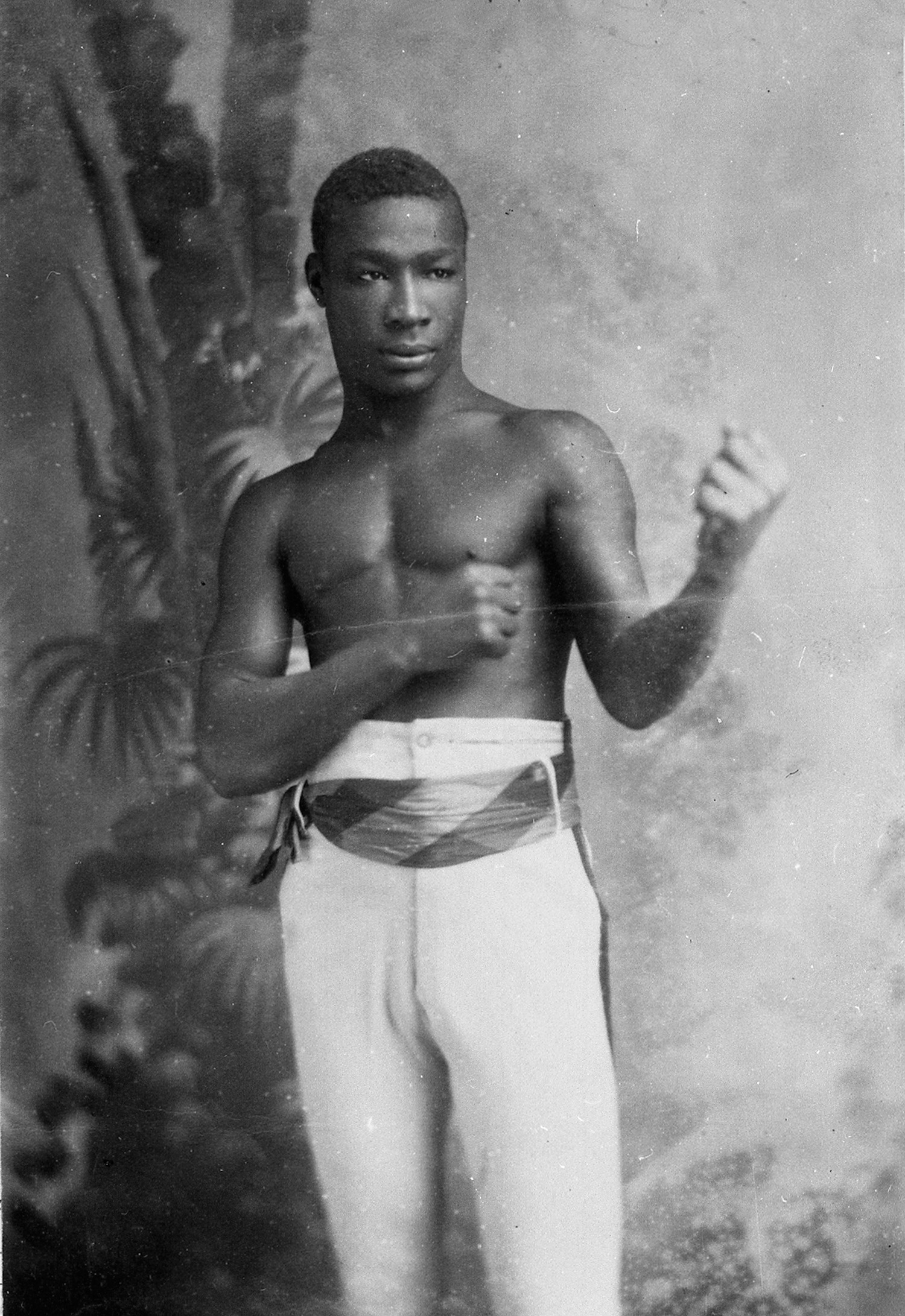
- Born: 1862; British West Indies
- Died: 1901 (aged 38–39)
- Other name: Ching Hook
- Occupation: Professional boxer
- Years active: 1882-1892
- Spouse: Mary Ann Maddin (m. 1891)

Hezekiah Moscow (c. 1862 – c. 1901) was a West Indian migrant who worked as a lion tamer and competed as a professional boxer under the ring name Ching Hook. In the 2025 Disney+ series A Thousand Blows, a fictionalized version of his character is portrayed by Malachi Kirby.

== Early life ==
Moscow was born around 1862 in the West Indies, although his place of origin is unknown.

== Career ==
In 1884, Moscow worked as a lion tamer and performer at the East London Aquarium. Moscow was later accused of mistreating four bears under his care by the RSPCA. In January 1888, Moscow, who boxed under the name Ching Hook, held a week-long residency at the Sebright Music Hall, where he sparred with Sam Baxter twice nightly. He also worked as a master of ceremonies, took part in benefit events, and managed boxing venues at the City of Norwich pub in Whitechapel and the Walnut Tree in Stepney. By the end of 1888, he had received the honorary boxing title of "Professor" and was teaching at Watford Boxing Club.

In 1891, Moscow toured with a theatre company as part of the act Daultray, Higgins and Ching Ghook. By June 1892, he had almost entirely disappeared from newspaper reports after about a decade in London.

== Personal life ==
He married Mary Ann Maddin in 1891, and their daughter Eliza was born the same year.

== Death or disappearance ==
Moscow's whereabouts after March 1892 remain unknown. His wife appealed for information about him in the press, and their daughter later made similar appeals. No death, hospital, or obituary records for Moscow/Hook have been found under any name variations, leaving his disappearance a mystery.
