= Dave Grossman (author) =

American writer and law enforcement trainer

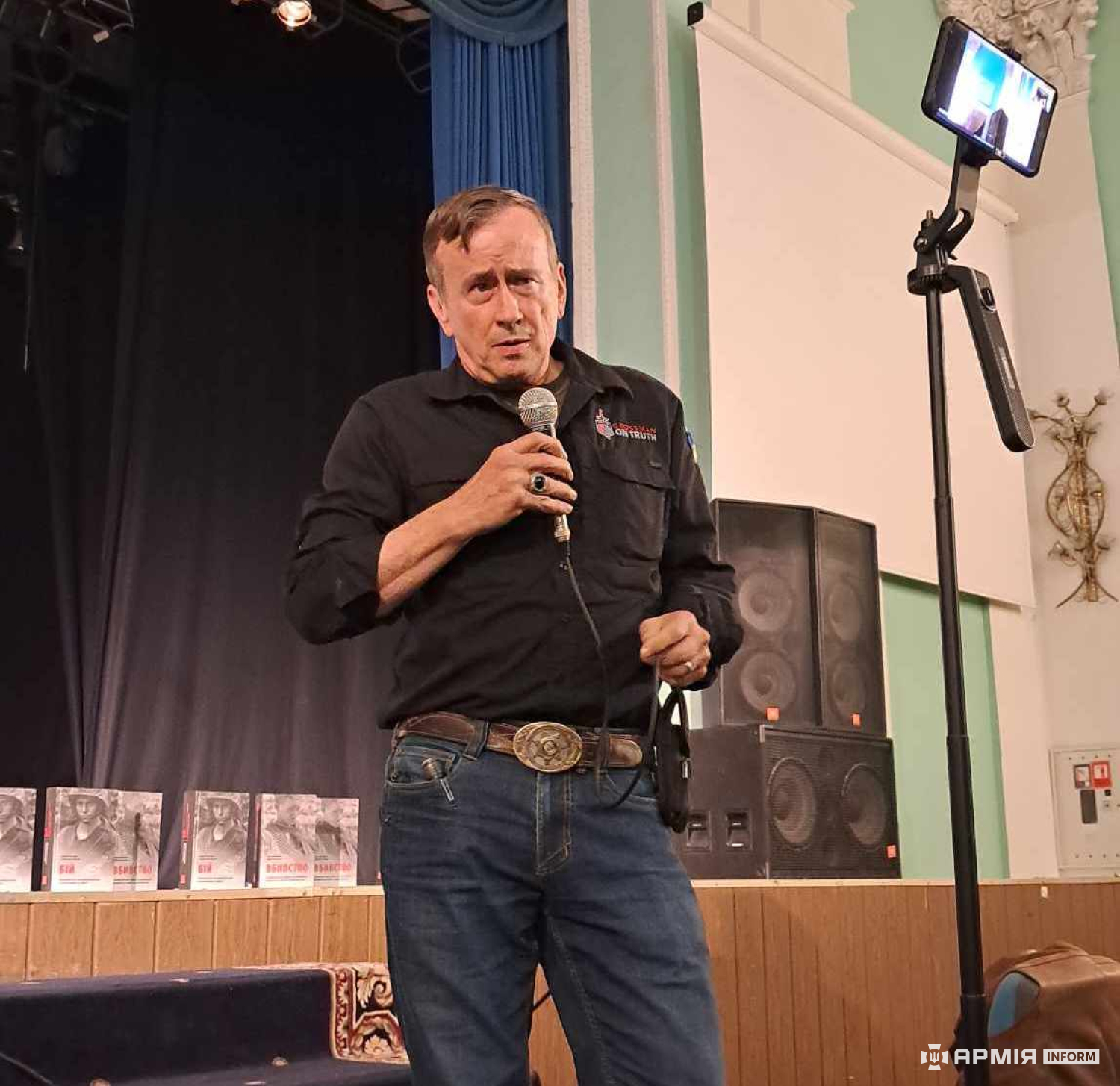
- Born: David Allen Grossman; August 23, 1956 (age 70); Frankfurt, Germany
- Occupations: Author; trainer
- Military career
- Branch: United States Army
- Service years: 1974–1998
- Stationed in: United States

David Allen Grossman (born August 23, 1956) is an American author and trainer who conducts seminars on the psychology of lethal force. He is a retired lieutenant colonel in the United States Army.

== Early life and post-military life ==
Grossman was born in Frankfurt, West Germany on August 23, 1956. Following his retirement from the Army, Grossman founded the Killology Research Group to give seminars about the physiological and the psychological effects of having to use lethal force for law enforcement officers and soldiers. Grossman also speaks at civilian events on ways to reduce violence in society and deal with the aftermath of violent events such as school shootings. As a civilian, Grossman has been an expert witness in numerous state and federal court cases and was part of the prosecution team of United States vs. Timothy McVeigh. In 2022, Killology Research Group was renamed and rebranded to Grossman On Truth.

== Works ==
Grossman's first book, On Killing: The Psychological Cost of Learning to Kill in War and Society, is an analysis of the psychological processes involved with killing another human being. In it, he claims that most people have a phobia-level response to violence, and that soldiers have to be specifically trained to kill. He details some of the physical effects that violent stresses produce on humans, ranging from tunnel vision, changes in sonic perception, and post-traumatic stress disorder. Robert Engen, in a paper for the Canadian Military Journal critiquing On Killing, criticized Grossman's works, saying that "although On Killing and On Combat form an excellent starting point, there are too many problems with their interpretation for them to be considered the final word on the subject." Grossman's response to Engen, printed in the same journal, attempted to address the criticisms by arguing that S. L. A. Marshall's findings that man is not by nature a killer, even after having doubt cast on their methodology, have borne out in further scientific studies and real world experience, and furthermore, "have been the cornerstone of military and police training for over a half century." "On Killing" has been cited over 3300 times, noted by Google Scholar.

In Stop Teaching Our Kids to Kill: A Call to Action Against TV, Movie and Video Game Violence, Grossman argues that the techniques used by armies to train soldiers to kill are mirrored in certain types of video games. He claims that playing violent video games, particularly light-gun shooters of the first-person shooter-variety (where the player holds a weapon-like game controller), train children in the use of weapons and, more importantly, harden them emotionally to the task of murder by simulating the killing of hundreds or thousands of opponents in a single typical video game. He has repeatedly used the term "murder simulator" to describe first-person shooter games. His third non-fiction book, On Combat: The Psychology and Physiology of Deadly Conflict in War and in Peace, is an extension of his first, listing coping strategies for dealing with the physiological and psychological effects of violence for people who kill people in their line of work (soldiers and police officers).

== Criticism ==
University of Nebraska criminal justice professor Samuel Walker characterized Grossman's training as "okay for Green Berets but unacceptable for domestic policing. The best police chiefs in the country don’t want anything to do with this." In 2019, Minneapolis Mayor Jacob Frey announced a ban on what he termed "fear-based training", and mentioned Grossman's seminars. Grossman's sheep, sheepdogs and wolves analogy in On Combat, to describe non-violent civilians, violent protectors and violent predators, has been criticized by The Baffler for promoting militarism and disempowering civilians. This analogy was featured in the 2014 film American Sniper.

== Bibliography ==
=== Non-fiction ===
- On Killing: The Psychological Cost of Learning to Kill in War and Society by Lt. Col. Dave Grossman (1995) (ISBN 0-316-33000-0)
- Stop Teaching Our Kids to Kill: A Call to Action Against TV, Movie and Video Game Violence (1999) (ISBN 978-0609606131)
- On Combat: The Psychology and Physiology of Deadly Conflict in War and in Peace by Dave Grossman and Loren W. Christensen (2004) (ISBN 0-9649205-1-4)
- Warrior Mindset: Mental Toughness Skills for a Nation's Peacekeepers by Dr. Michael Asked, Loren W. Christensen, Dave Grossman (2010) (ISBN 978-0964920552)
- Assassination Generation: Video Games, Aggression, and the Psychology of Killing by Lt. Col. Dave Grossman, (2016) (ISBN 978-0-316-26593-5)
- Bulletproof Marriage: A 90-Day Devotional by Adam Davis and Lt. Col. Dave Grossman (2019) (ISBN 978-1424557592)
- On Spiritual Combat: 30 Missions for Victorious Warfare by Adam Davis and Lt. Col. Dave Grossman (2020) (ISBN 978-1424560073)
- Prayers & Promises for First Responders by Adam Davis and Lt. Col. Dave Grossman (2021) (ISBN 978-1424562787)

=== Fiction ===
- The War with Earth (2003) (ISBN 0-7434-9877-1) (with Leo Frankowski) Book two of the series starting with Frankowski's A Boy and his Tank.
- The Two-Space War (2004) (ISBN 1-4165-0928-3) (with Leo Frankowski) New series.
- Kren of the Mitchegai (2005) (ISBN 1-4165-0902-X) (with Leo Frankowski) Book three of the series starting with A Boy and his Tank.
- The Guns of Two-Space (2007) (with Bob Hudson) Book two of the series starting with The Two-Space War.
- Sheepdogs: Meet Our Nation's Warriors (2013) (ISBN 978-0615795171) (with Joey Karwal, and Stephanie Rogish)

=== Entries in scholarly reference works ===
- Hughbank, R., & Grossman, D., “The Psychological Aspects and Nature of Killing,” in Military Psychologists’ Desk Reference, Oxford University Press, 2013.
- Hughbank, R., & Grossman, D., “The Challenge of Getting Men to Kill: A View from Military Science,” in War, Peace, and Human Nature: The Convergence of Evolutionary and Cultural Views, Oxford University Press, 2013.
- Grossman, D., "Aggression and Violence," in Oxford Companion to American Military History, Oxford Press, 2000.
- Grossman, D., "Evolution of Weaponry," in Encyclopedia of Violence, Peace and Conflict, Academic Press, 2000.
- Grossman, D., & Siddle, B.K., "Psychological Effects of Combat," in Encyclopedia of Violence, Peace and Conflict, Academic Press, 2000.
- Grossman, Dave, "Two Lessons from Jonesboro: Conducting Critical Incident Debriefings and the Role of Television in Feeding the Need for Enemies".
- Klinger, D.A. & Grossman, D., "Who Should Deal With Foreign Terrorists On U.S. Soil?: Socio-legal Consequences of September 11 and the Ongoing Threat of Terrorist Attacks in America," Harvard Journal of Law & Public Policy, Vol. 25, Number 2, 2001.
- Jurkiewicz, Carole & Grossman, Dave, "Evil at Work".
- Murray, K.A., Grossman, D., & Kentridge, R.W., "Behavioral Psychology," in Encyclopedia of Violence, Peace and Conflict, Academic Press, 2000.

=== Journal Articles and Periodicals ===
- Grossman, D., “Counterpoint,” Variety, Vol. 429, No. 10 Special Report: Violence and Entertainment.
- Grossman, D., “Combat Veterans, Violent Crime, and PTSD,” Recovery Today: Institute of Chemical Dependency Studies, Vol. 16 No. 8, Aug 2011. .(not posted on line yet)
- Grossman, D., “Preparation, Internal Locus of Control, and Those Who Don’t Get PTSD” The Journal of Law Enforcement, Vol. 1 No. 3, .
- Grossman, D., “The “Myth” of our Returning Veterans and Violent Crime.” Inside Homeland Security: Journal of the American Board for Certification in Homeland Security, Vol. 8, Issue 3, Fall 2010.
- Grossman, D., “America’s Sheepdogs: Standing Guard Inside Homelend Security.” Inside Homeland Security: Journal of the American Board for Certification in Homeland Security, Vol. 8, Issue 3, Fall 2010.
- Rahman, M., Grossman, D., & Asken, M., "High Velocity Human Factors: Factoring the human being into future police technology." PoliceOne.com, http://www.policeone.com/training/articles/1646301, February 5, 2008.
- Grossman, D., “Preface: Hunting Wolves.” Global Crime, Vol. 7, Number 3-4, Aug-Nov 2006.
- Grossman, D., “Life Not Death: ‘Earn It’.” Integrity Talk: The Official Publication of the International Association of Ethics Trainers, Summer 2005.
- Grossman, D., “Justice, Not Vengeance.” Integrity Talk: The Official Publication of the International Association of Ethics Trainers, Spring 2005.
- Grossman, D., & Christensen, L., “The Murder Statistic is Not a True Indication of the Problem.” The Firearms Instructor: The Official Journal of the International Association of Law Enforcement Firearms Instructors, Issue 36/Spring 2004.
- Grossman, D., & Christensen, L., “Terrorism and Active Shooters: The Threat of Mass Murder on American Soil.” The Firearms Instructor: The Official Journal of the International Association of Law Enforcement Firearms Instructors, Issue 35/Winter 2003.
- Grossman, D., “Islamic Zealots, Corporate Predators, and the Attack on Democracy: A Moral Perspective On Our Current State of Affairs.” Tuebor: A Publication of the Michigan State Police Training Division, Winter, 2003.
- Grossman, D., & Christensen. L., "In Order to Survive." Signalman: Journal of the Royal Australian Corps of Signals, Autumn/Winter, 2003.
- Grossman, D., & Christensen. L., "Practising to Be Miserable." Signalman: Journal of the Royal Australian Corps of Signals, Spring/Summer, 2003.
- Klinger, D., & Grossman, D., “Answering Foreign Terrorists on U.S. Soil.” Harvard Journal of Law & Public Policy, Spring 2002.
- Grossman, D., “Terrorism and Local Police.” Law and Order: The Magazine for Police Management, Dec 2001. (Reprinted in Ohio Police Chief Magazine, summer 2002.)
- Strasburger, V., & Grossman, D, "How Many More Columbines? What Can Pediatricians Do About School and Media Violence." Pediatric Annals, 30:2/Feb 2001.
- Grossman, D., “Human Factors in War: The Psychology and Physiology of Close Combat.” Australian Army Journal, Issue 1/99.

== Patents ==
- Firearms Safety Patent: Ergonomic Grip for a Slide of a Semiautomatic Firearm, Inventors: David Grossman, Jon Grossman, Patent No. D697,997
- Firearms Safety Patent: Off-Trigger Locator for a Firearm, Inventors: Bruce Siddle, David Grossman, Jon Grossman, Patent No. 8,671,605, Patent No. D697,996
- Firearms Safety Patent: Off-Trigger Locator Attachment, Inventors: Bruce Siddle, David Grossman, Jon Grossman, Patent No. D701280
- Firearms Safety Patent: Safety Index for a Firearm, Inventors: David Grossman, Jon Grossman, Patent No. D697,998
- Firearms Safety Patent: Micro-Front Sight for a Firearm, Inventors: David Grossman, Jon Grossman, Patent No. D701284
