= S. L. A. Marshall =

American military historian and theorist (1900–1977)

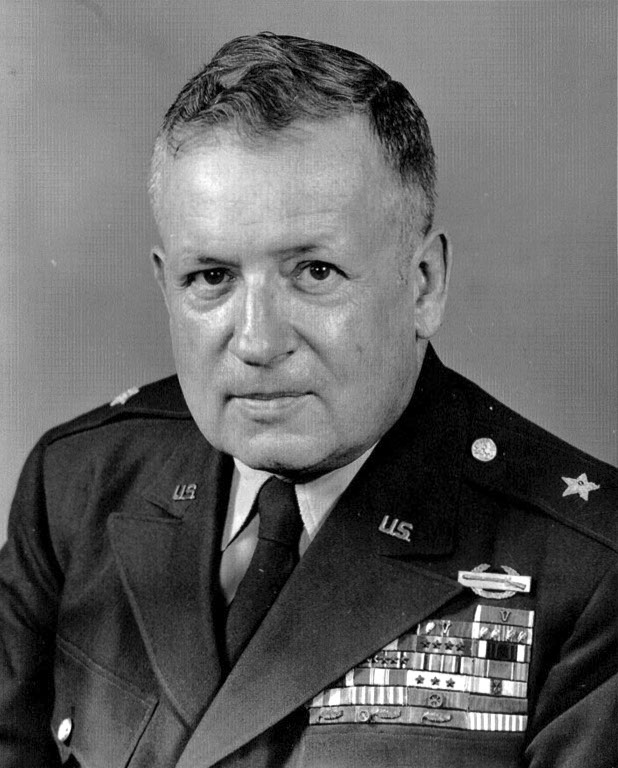
- Born: Samuel Lyman Atwood Marshall; July 18, 1900; Catskill, New York, U.S.
- Died: 17 December 1977 (aged 77); El Paso, Texas, U.S.
- Burial place: Fort Bliss National Cemetery
- Military career
- Allegiance: United States of America
- Branch: United States Army
- Rank: Brigadier General
- Nickname: Slam
- Units: 90th Infantry Division (WWI); Eighth Army (Korean War)
- Conflicts: World War I; Battle of Saint-Mihiel; Meuse-Argonne Offensive; World War II; Korean War
- Awards: Legion of Merit; Bronze Star Medal (2); Combat Infantryman Badge
- Other work: author journalist

Samuel Lyman Atwood Marshall (Note: Also known as "Slam") (July 18, 1900 – December 17, 1977) was a military journalist and historian from Catskill, New York. He served with the American Expeditionary Forces in World War I before becoming a journalist, specializing in military affairs.

In 1940, he published Blitzkrieg: Armies on Wheels, an analysis of the tactics used by the Wehrmacht, and served in the U.S. Army as its chief combat historian during World War II and the Korean War. He retired in 1960 but acted as an unofficial advisor and historian during the Vietnam War. Marshall wrote over 30 books, his most famous being Men Against Fire: The Problem of Battle Command.

In Men Against Fire, Marshall argued that fewer than 25 percent of soldiers actually fired at the enemy during combat. His analysis of the causes remains contested, while the data and methodology used to support his claim have been challenged. However, despite these misgivings, his conclusion that a significant percentage of troops failed to produce aimed fire in action have been reinforced by other studies, while his suggestions on how to reduce these numbers remain influential.

== Personal details ==
Samuel Lyman Atwood Marshall was born in Catskill, New York, on July 18, 1900, son of Caleb C. and Alice Medora (Beeman) Marshall. He was raised in Colorado and California, where he briefly worked as a child actor for Essanay Studios, before his family relocated to El Paso, Texas, where he attended high school.

He was married three times, first to Ruth Elstner, with whom he had a son before divorcing; his second wife, Edith Ives Westervelt, died in 1953 and he had three daughters with his third wife, Catherine Finnerty. Marshall died in El Paso on December 17, 1977, and was buried at Fort Bliss National Cemetery, Section A, Grave 124. The University of Texas at El Paso library has a special collection built around his books and manuscripts.

== Career ==
=== Career pre-1942 ===
Marshall enlisted in the US Army on November 28, 1917, joining the 315th Engineer Battalion, part of the 90th Infantry Division. Based initially in Camp Travis, near San Antonio, Texas, his division transferred to France with the American Expeditionary Forces in June 1918 and Marshall was promoted to sergeant. The 315th took part in the Battle of Saint-Mihiel and Meuse-Argonne Offensive. A 1921 history by of A Company 315th Engineers from formation to the end of 1918 shows that from 22 August to the Armistice, Marshall's company lost eight dead and fifteen wounded out of 165 men.

Shortly after the Armistice, Marshall was selected to take the entrance examinations for the United States Military Academy, part of an initiative to promote exceptional soldiers from the ranks. He subsequently attended Officer Candidate School, was commissioned in early 1919, and remained in France to assist with post-war demobilization.

After his discharge, he remained in the United States Army Reserve, and attended the Texas College of Mines, now the University of Texas at El Paso. In the early 1920s, he became a newspaper reporter and editor, first with the El Paso Herald, and later The Detroit News. As a reporter, Marshall gained a national reputation for his coverage of Latin American and European military affairs, including the Spanish Civil War. In 1940, he published Blitzkrieg: Armies on Wheels, an analysis of the tactics developed by the Wehrmacht prior to World War II, and used during its invasion of Poland and Czechoslovakia.

=== World War II combat historian ===
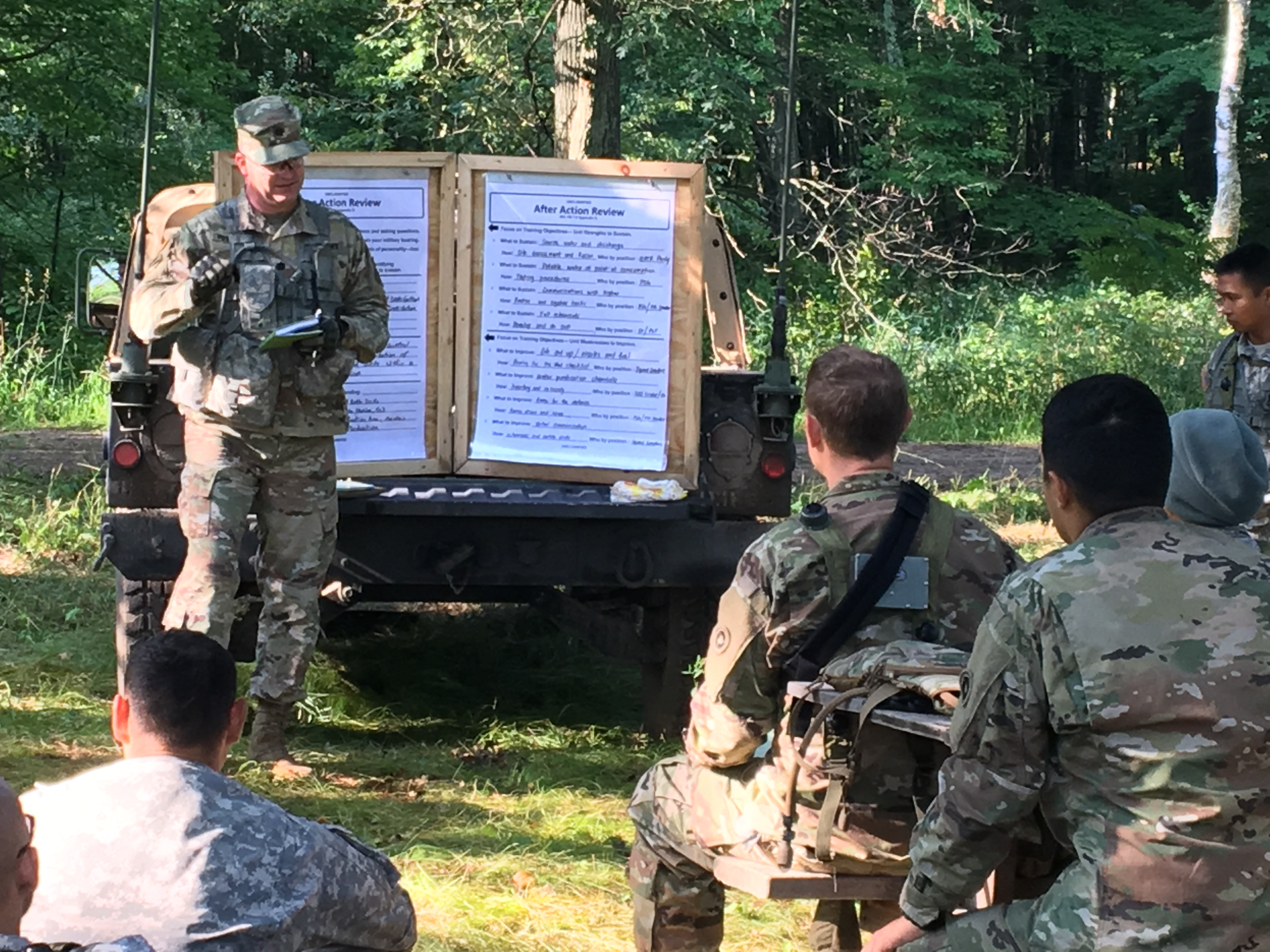
Marshall collected data using the small group debrief or after action review, a technique still employed by modern armies

Following American entry into World War II in December 1941, the United States Army created the "Center of Military History", whose role was to "gather historically significant data and materials" for the benefit of future historians, an organisation that still exists. This initially consisted of 27 officers, including Marshall, although he viewed himself as a military analyst, rather than a historian. His first combat assignment was the Battle of Makin in November 1943, during which he used the oral history technique known as after action review, a process still employed by modern armies. He would gather surviving members of a front line unit and debrief them as a group on their combat experiences of a day or two before.

Marshall later claimed he did so to resolve a dispute over who had been responsible for holding off a number of Japanese counter-attacks. By interviewing individual participants, each with a slightly different perspective, he created a considerably more detailed and accurate picture of the action than was possible previously. His experience as a journalist, and use of standard questions, allowed him to quickly produce large numbers of reports. These were used by the Army to identify tactical lessons; for example, Marshall found tanks called in to support infantry often withdrew even when their help was still required. To overcome this problem, they were made subordinate to the local infantry commander for the duration of the action.

His interview techniques were quickly adopted throughout the US Army, and in 1944 Marshall was transferred to Europe where he ended the war as chief combat historian. In 1947, he used these interviews as the basis for his best known work Men Against Fire, whose most notable conclusion was that 75% of individual riflemen engaged in combat never fired at an exposed enemy for the purpose of killing, even when directly threatened. (Note: Much of the criticism later directed at him missed an important qualification. Marshall concluded key weapons, such as flamethrowers, usually fired and crew-served weapons like machine guns almost always fired, while the rate increased greatly if a nearby leader demanded it. His argument was that if unguided, the great majority of individual combatants throughout history appear to have been unable or unwilling to kill.) Marshall argued civilian norms against taking life were so strong many conscripts could not bring themselves to kill, even at the risk of their own lives, and suggested changes in training that would increase the percentage willing to engage the enemy with direct fire. Many were incorporated by the US military; Marshall reported far more men fired weapons during the Vietnam War.

Less well known, but perhaps more significant, was a post-war project led by Marshall that employed former German officers to analyse all battles fought in Europe from 1939 to 1945. At its height, over 200 participated, including Heinz Guderian and Franz Halder, who allegedly used his position to vet the monographs and promulgate the myth of the clean Wehrmacht.

=== Later military service ===
Marshall was recalled for three months in late 1950 during the Korean War as Historian/Operations Analyst for the Eighth Army. He used numerous combat interviews with Americans serving in Korea to create a treatise titled "Commentary on Infantry and Weapons in Korea 1950–51". His conclusions were later incorporated into a plan to improve combat training, weapons, equipment, and tactics.

Following his retirement from the Army Reserve in 1960, with the rank of brigadier general, Marshall continued to serve as an unofficial adviser. He was a member of the Citizens Committee for a Free Cuba, founded in 1963. As a private citizen, he spent late 1966 and early 1967 in Vietnam on an Army-sponsored tour for the official purpose of teaching his after-action interview techniques to field commanders, in order to improve data collection for both the chain of command and the future official history of the Vietnam War. The Army Chief of Military History's representative on the tour, Colonel David Hackworth, collected his own observations from the trip and published them as The Vietnam Primer, with Marshall credited as co-author.

== Controversies ==
=== Research methodology ===
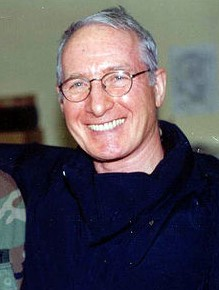
David Hackworth, who portrayed Marshall as a "liar and profiteer"

Although Marshall's conclusions were widely accepted during his lifetime, after his death in 1977 some commentators claimed the interviews used to support his theories either did not exist, or were fabricated. Later studies comparing Marshall's claims to his original notes concluded that while he "occasionally increased numbers...or distances by twenty to fifty percent", in general his books accurately reflected the interviews. The official historian of the 1944 Battle of the Bulge also wrote that Marshall's oral interviews with participants in the battle aligned with testimony from other sources.

In contrast, his former collaborator, Hackworth, described Marshall as "less a military analyst than a military ambulance chaser," and "more a voyeur than a warrior". Although Hackworth's own reliability as a witness has been questioned, questions over his methodology had already been raised by others. Marshall received similar criticisms from Harold Leinbaugh, an ex-FBI employee and WWII infantry veteran, who considered his conclusions a slur on the fighting ability of American soldiers and labelled them "absurd, ridiculous and totally nonsensical".

Doubts as to whether Marshall's conclusions derive from a reliable and “systematic collection of data" remain even among those who support his conclusions, while Canadian military historian Robert Engen claims Marshall "wilfully disregarded important evidence" that did not align with his preconceptions. Antony Beevor wrote that some of Marshall's analysis was shown to be "very dubious", even though he agrees with the overall premise that in a conscript army, only a few soldiers shot at the enemy.

Despite this, Grossman argues "Marshall's fundamental conclusion that man is not, by nature, a killer" is confirmed by data from other armies and different historical periods. These include studies conducted by the 19th century French military theorist Ardant du Picq, Paddy Griffith's 1989 book Battle Tactics of the American Civil War, which analyses the "extraordinarily low killing rate" among American Civil War regiments, and in Acts of War; The Behaviour of Men in Battle by British military historian Richard Holmes of Argentine conscripts during the Falklands War. (Note: Holmes also notes British soldiers in the Falklands, who were all professionals, all fired their weapons, reinforcing the importance of training and habituation.) The claim was also supported by FBI studies into non-firing rates by law enforcement officers in the 1950s and 1960s.

Surveys of after action reports conducted during WWII in the British and Soviet armies showed low firing rates were common to both, with Russian officers suggested inspecting rifles after combat, and executing those found with clean barrels. Engen argues contemporary Canadian evidence does not support Marshall's or Grossman's claims of the universality of the ratio due to an innate resistance to killing", although Grossman suggests this may be the result of training techniques that pioneered realistic marksmanship training. (Note: Engen offers several reasons why fire might be withheld; fear, fatigue, lack of opportunity, "live and let live" attitude, not wanting to bring return fire, or to conserve ammunition and shoot only when it would be effective.)

=== WWI service ===
Leinbaugh viewed Marshall's claims as "maligning" American infantrymen and admitted he took them personally, and also queried details of his World War I service. He argued significant parts of Marshall's service record were not substantiated by independent evidence, including his claim to have been the youngest commissioned officer in the US Army, or to have commanded troops in combat. Grossman challenged the suggestion that these amounted to fabrications.

In response, his grandson John Douglas Marshall, who was disowned by Marshall after registering as a conscientious objector during the Vietnam War, wrote a memoir about him in 1993 titled "Reconciliation Road". In this he analyzed his grandfather's WWI service, using official army records and personal letters written during the Meuse-Argonne offensive. He ultimately concluded the vast majority of Marshall's experiences in WWI can be independently verified by his service record.

== Legacy ==
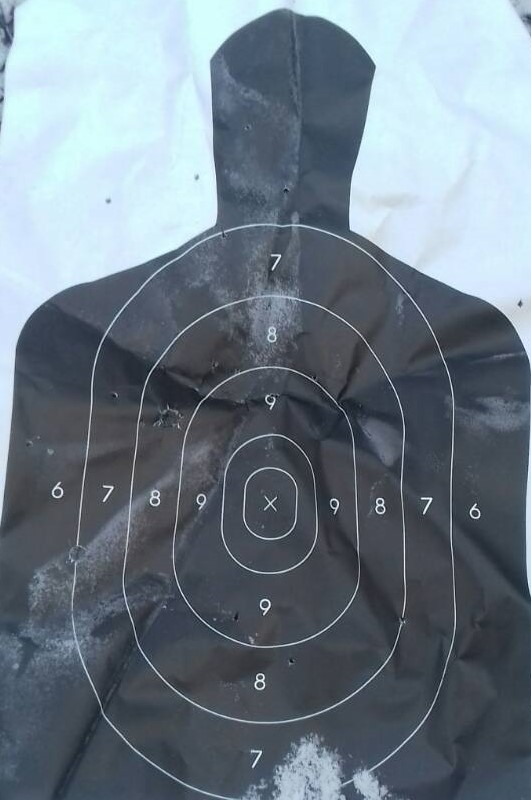
The widespread adoption of Shooting targets for firearms training in the US Army and law enforcement agencies was based on a recommendation from Marshall

One of Marshall's suggestions for improving rates of fire was to use realistic man-shaped targets rather than bullseyes, a practice which is now standard among militaries and law enforcement agencies. Much of the ongoing discussion regarding his research centres on reasons for "non-firing", and is of continuing interest to militaries in order to determine how to optimise training and manage issues like post traumatic stress disorder. Engen suggests Marshall's work led combat psychologists to identify the act of killing as a major factor in PTSD, not just an individual's personal experience under fire or the deaths of their comrades. This factor has been identified as the most significant driver of PTSD among remote drone operators, who may never directly come under fire.

Marshall's contention low firing rates were a function of social conditioning against killing has been partially supported by historians like Omer Bartov, who suggests weakening these norms through deliberate brutalisation was one reason for the Wehrmacht's better combat performance in WWII compared to other armies. Bartov argues achieving this came from the long-standing German military doctrine of wide scale reprisals against civilians or those accused of supporting partisan operations and Nazi propaganda describing opponents as "sub-human".

However, he identified other elements in overcoming this reluctance, the strongest being loyalty to the group; paradoxically, the enormous casualties suffered by the Wehrmacht led to an increased focus on sections of 4–6 'comrades', which were far better at maintaining morale and fighting ability. It has been argued the incorporation of this small group doctrine into infantry training was the single most important factor for improving the ratio of fire metric in Korea and later Vietnam.

In his assessment of Marshall, military historian John Keegan wrote his purpose was not "merely to describe and analyse, but to persuade the American army it was fighting its wars the wrong way...in arguing his case, [he was] undoubtedly guilty of over-emphasis and special pleading. [However], his arguments were consonantly effective so that he has the unusual experience, for an historian, of seeing his message not merely accepted in his lifetime but translated into practice."

On the other hand, Roger Engen concluded Marshall was "factually incorrect in his assertions that only 15-20 percent of riflemen fired their weapons in the Second World War. Even if he was wholly correct, his interpretation of the meaning of this phenomenon does not stand up well to scrutiny. .. [T]o universalize Marshall’s findings beyond the specific subjects he studied is premature."

== Medals and decorations ==
| Combat Infantryman Badge |

| Legion of Merit and "V" Device |
| Bronze Star Medal with one Oak Leaf Cluster and "V" Device |
| Army Commendation Medal with four Oak Leaf Clusters |
| World War I Victory Medal with four Battle Clasps |
| Army of Occupation of Germany Medal |
| American Campaign Medal |
| European-African-Middle Eastern Campaign Medal with four service stars |
| World War II Victory Medal |
| Army of Occupation Medal |
| National Defense Service Medal |
| Korean Service Medal with three service stars |
| Armed Forces Reserve Medal |
| French Croix de Guerre 1939–1945 with Palm |
| United Nations Korea Medal |

== Bibliography ==
- Blitzkrieg (1940)
- Armies on Wheels (1941)
- Bastogne: The Story of the First Eight Days... (1946)
- Men Against Fire: The Problem of Battle Command (1947)
- The Soldier's Load and The Mobility of a Nation (1950)
- The River and the Gauntlet: Defeat of the Eighth Army by the Chinese Communist Forces, November, 1950, in the Battle of the Chongchon River, Korea (1951)
- Pork Chop Hill: The American Fighting Man in Action, Korea, Spring, 1953 (1956)
- Sinai Victory: Command Decisions in History's Shortest War, Israel's Hundred-Hour Conquest of Egypt East of Suez, Autumn, 1956 (1958)
- Night Drop: The American Airborne Invasion of Normandy (1962)
- Battle at Best (1963)
- World War I (1964)
- Battles in the Monsoon: Campaigning in the Central Highlands, South Vietnam, Summer 1966 (1967)
- The Vietnam Primer (1967) (with David Hackworth)
- Swift Sword: The Historical Record of Israel's Victory, June 1967 (1967)
- Ambush: The Battle of Dau Tieng (1968)
- Bird: The Christmastide Battle (1968)
- West to Cambodia (1968)
- The Fields of Bamboo: Dong Tre, Trung Luong, and Hoa Hoi, Three Battles Just Beyond the South China Sea (1971)
- Crimsoned Prairie: The Indian Wars on the Great Plains (1972)
- Bringing Up the Rear: A Memoir (1979) (posthumous autobiography)

== Sources ==
- Bacevich, AJ. "Saving Face: Hackworth's Troubling Odyssey" (PDF). U.S. Army War College. Archived (PDF) from the original on October 8, 2020.
- Bartov, Omer (2001). The Eastern Front, 1941–1945: German Troops and the Barbarization of Warfare. Palgrave Macmillan. ISBN 978-0333949443.
- Beevor, Antony (2009). D-Day: The Battle for Normandy. Viking Books. ISBN 978-0670021192.
- Burdett, Thomas F (2010). "Biography: Marshall, Samuel Lyman Atwood". Handbook of Texas Online. Texas State Historical Association.
- Cole, Hugh (1994). Cannedy, Susan (ed.). Introduction to SLAM; the Influence of S.L.A. Marshall on the United States Army. Office of the Command Historian, U.S. Army Training and Doctrine Command.
- Engen, Robert (2011). "S.L.A. Marshall and the Ratio of Fire History, Interpretation, and the Canadian Experience" (PDF). Canadian Military History. 20 (4).
- Grossman, Dave (2004). "S.L.A. Marshall Revisted?". Canadian Military History. 9.
- Grossman, Dave (2000). Chambers, Jonathan Whiteclay (ed.). Aggression and Violence in The Oxford Companion to American Military History. OUP. ISBN 978-0195071986.
- Hackworth, David (1989). About Face. Simon & Schuster. ISBN 0-671-52692-8.
- Hackworth, David H.; England, Eilhys (2002). Steel My Soldiers' Hearts. Simon & Schuster. ISBN 978-0-7432-4613-2.
- Holmes, Richard (2003). Acts of War: The Behaviour of Men in Battle. Orion. ISBN 978-0297846680.
- Jones, Edgar (2006). "The Psychology of Killing: The Combat Experience of British Soldiers during the First World War". Journal of Contemporary History. 41 (2): 229–246. doi:10.1177/0022009406062055. S2CID 145518638.
- Jordan, Kelly C (2002). "Right for the Wrong Reasons: S. L. A. Marshall and the Ratio of Fire in Korea". Military History. 66 (1): 135–162. doi:10.2307/2677347. JSTOR 2677347.
- Keegan, John (1986) [1976]. The Face Of Battle: A Study of Agincourt, Waterloo and the Somme. Dorset Press. ISBN 978-0880290838.
- Marshall, John Douglas (1993). Reconciliation Road: A Family Odyssey of War and Honor. Syracuse University Press. ISBN 978-0815602743.
- Marshall, SLA (1947). Men Against Fire: The Problem Of Battle Command In Future War (2012 ed.). Literary Licensing. ISBN 978-1258041182.
- Marshall, SLA (1940). Blitzkrieg: Its History, Strategy, Economics and the Challenge to America. Morrow.
- Marshall, SLA (1951). Commentary on Infantry and Weapons in Korea 1950–51. Operations Research Office (ORO), U.S. Army.
- Millinder, Lindy (1921). A Year and a Day; History of "A" Company, 315th Engineers (PDF). 90th Division Association.
- Smelser, Ronald; Davies, Edward J. (2008). The Myth of the Eastern Front: The Nazi-Soviet War in American Popular Culture. Cambridge University Press. ISBN 978-0-521-83365-3.
- Smoler, Frederic (1989). "The Secret Of The Soldiers Who Didn't Shoot". American Heritage Magazine. 40 (2).
- Spiller, Roger (1988). "SLA Marshall and the Ratio of Fire". RUSI Journal. 133 (4): 63–71. doi:10.1080/03071848808445332.
- Williams, Frederick Deane Goodwin (1990). SLAM, the Influence of S.L.A. Marshall on the United States Army (2015 ed.). Office of the Command Historian United States Army Training and Doctrine Command. ISBN 978-1508436553.
- United States War Department (1920). Battle Participation of Organizations of the American Expeditionary Forces. Government Printing Office.
