= The Inspector Lynley Mysteries =

British television crime drama series (2001–2008)

- DVD cover of Series One and Two
- Genre: Crime drama
- Created by: Elizabeth George
- Starring: Nathaniel Parker; Sharon Small; Lesley Vickerage; Catherine Russell; Paul Hickey; Shaun Parkes; Emma Fielding
- Country of origin: United Kingdom
- Original language: English
- No. of series: 6
- No. of episodes: 24

Production
- Executive producer: Ruth Baumgarten
- Producer: Sally Haynes
- Running time: 90 minutes

Original release
- Network: BBC One
- Release: 12 March 2001 – 1 June 2008

The Inspector Lynley Mysteries is a British crime drama television series that aired on BBC One from 12 March 2001 to 1 June 2008, and is available to stream on BritBox. Based on novels by the American writer Elizabeth George, it comprises six series and 24 episodes. The protagonist, Detective Inspector Tommy Lynley, 8th Earl of Asherton (Nathaniel Parker), is assigned to the Metropolitan Police and finds himself paired with Detective Sergeant Barbara Havers (Sharon Small). In addition to the tensions involved in solving murder cases, the series is built on clashes of personality, gender and class: Lynley is a polished man and a peer of the realm, and Havers is an untidy woman from a working-class background.

In August 2007, the BBC announced its intention to stop production of The Inspector Lynley Mysteries. Fans of the series mounted a campaign to save it, including with a petition and by contacting the BBC, but without success. All six series have since been released on DVD, distributed by Acorn Media UK.

All episodes from the first two series and two from the third are based on Elizabeth George's novels, though the plots and characters are often significantly altered. Initially adapted by Lizzie Mickery, later episodes are original stories for television based on George's characters. The music for the series was composed by Robert Lockhart; later series were scored by Debbie Wiseman.

== Production ==
The first episode (pilot), A Great Deliverance, was broadcast on 12 and 13 March 2001, the only two-part episode throughout the series run. It is based on the first Inspector Lynley novel.

The first full series began broadcasting on 8 April 2002, with the first episode based on and named after the third novel, Well-Schooled in Murder. The first eleven episodes were based on and named after the eleven Lynley novels published from 1988 to 2001, but not all in the published sequence.

== Filming ==
Exterior shots of Lynley and Havers' base were filmed at the Bircham Dyson Bell solicitors offices on Broadway, central London. The first episode of series five was notable for being shot in Dungeness in Kent. In the first episode, Lynley drove a Peugeot 607; whereas in both series one and two he drove a Jensen Interceptor; and in later episodes a Bristol 410. Despite the frequently recurring remark in PBS Mystery! presenter Diana Rigg's introductions to the series that Lynley "is the one with the Bentley", he never drove a Bentley on TV. He does, however, drive one in the George novels. In the pilot episode, the character of Helen Clyde was played by Emma Fielding. She was portrayed by Lesley Vickerage from series one to three (from series three she and Lynley had married and she was thus known as Helen Lynley) and by Catherine Russell in series five.

== Cast ==
- Nathaniel Parker as Detective Inspector Thomas Lynley
- Sharon Small as Detective Sergeant Barbara Havers
- Emma Fielding as Helen Clyde (Pilot)
- Lesley Vickerage as Helen Clyde (Series 1–2) / Helen Lynley (Series 3)
- Catherine Russell as Helen Lynley (Series 5)
- Paul Hickey as Forensic Pathologist Stewart Lafferty (Series 4–6)
- Shaun Parkes as Detective Constable Winston Nkata (Series 5–6)

== Episode list ==
=== A Great Deliverance (2001) ===
No. overall	No. in series	Title	Directed by	Written by	Original release date	Viewers (millions)
1	1	"A Great Deliverance (Part One)"	Richard Laxton	Lizzie Mickery	12 March 2001	8.37m
When a farmer, William Tey, is hacked to death with an axe in his barn on the Yorkshire Moors, Scotland Yard assigns Detective Inspector Thomas Lynley and Detective Sergeant Barbara Havers to the case. Found dead at the feet of his teenage daughter, who was covered in blood and is too traumatised to say what happened, the investigation reveals that Tey's wife had left him many years before and his other daughter has run away, refusing to have anything more to do with him. When it transpires his nephew will now inherit his farm, it provides Lynley with a possible motive for the killing.
2	2	"A Great Deliverance (Part Two)"	Richard Laxton	Lizzie Mickery	13 March 2001	6.93m
The investigation into William Tey's murder continues, leading Lynley and Havers into the seamy side of a quiet English village. Although he was a stalwart of the local church, Tey had a hidden past which provides a wide range of suspects and motives. It seems that an old case of infanticide may hold the key to the present case. Meanwhile, Lynley is forced to deal with his own traumas: a group of former colleagues who would like nothing better than to bring him down, and Deborah, the woman he loves, has just married his best friend.

=== Series 1 (2002) ===
No. overall	No. in series	Title	Directed by	Written by	Original release date	Viewers (millions)
3	1	"Well Schooled in Murder"	Robert Young	Simon Block	8 April 2002	6.84m
Lynley is asked by an old school friend to investigate when one of his pupils is killed. The school in question is Bredgar Hall, a haven for the rich and the privileged with annual fees of £20,000 a year. The dead boy however, 13-year-old Matthew Whately, didn't come from a rich family. From all accounts, he was well liked and managed to fit into the school and its unique culture quite well. Faced with school administrators who seem more concerned with the school's reputation than the boy's death, Lynley and Havers must determine if the threat is from students, staff or someone not at all connected with the school.
4	2	"Payment in Blood"	Kim Flitcroft	Lizzie Mickery	15 April 2002	6.53m
Lynley and Havers are sent to a remote Scottish mansion house, the home of Sir Stuart Stinhurst, to investigate the violent death of a famous playwright whilst she was helping to rehearse a production of her new play. Initial investigation reveals that practically anybody could have committed the crime, but everybody appears to have a convincing alibi and nobody has a motive. As the investigation continues, an apparent nearby suicide begins to have a bearing on the case - but Lynley believes that it wasn't suicide.
5	3	"For the Sake of Elena"	Richard Laxton	Valerie Windsor	22 April 2002	6.98m
When the daughter of a Cambridge professor is brutally killed while out jogging, Lynley and Havers are assigned to the case. The young woman was deaf, and on the evidence, it appears the attack was deliberate. There are any number of suspects: the girl's father is divorced, re-married to a much younger woman who suspects him of having an affair; another Cambridge professor known for being a bit too friendly with students and against whom she was about to make a formal sexual harassment complaint; her ex-boyfriend, with whom she had recently broken up; and a student advisor who was very attracted to her, but in whom she had little interest.
6	4	"Missing Joseph"	Richard Laxton	Lizzie Mickery	29 April 2002	6.05m
While on detachment to the Lancashire police, Lynley investigates the apparent murder of the Reverend Robin Sage, who is found on a rural path, where he was presumably walking home. The autopsy reveals that he was poisoned with wild hemlock. He had dinner the previous evening with Juliet Spence, who was also violently ill through the night, but survived the poisoning. Juliet is involved in a relationship with PC Steve Shepherd, son of the local DCI, Kenneth Shepherd, and it is apparent that Juliet's teenage daughter, Maggie, is not pleased with her mother's choice.

=== Series 2 (2003) ===
No. overall	No. in series	Title	Directed by	Written by	Original release date	Viewers (millions)
7	1	"Playing for the Ashes"	Richard Spence	Kate Wood	10 March 2003	7.05m
When England cricketer Kenneth Waring dies of asphyxiation after a fire is set at a friend's house, Lynley has no doubt that he is dealing with murder. The house belonged to Waring's patron, and close friend, Miriam Whitelaw - who had a visitor the evening Waring died - her estranged daughter Olivia. Waring was separated from his wife, Jeannie, and had recently given her divorce papers. His lover and agent, Gabriella Patten, the ex-wife of a cricket teammate, has gone missing. Miriam had recently been attacked by animal rights activists which, unbeknown to her, included her daughter. When Waring's son confesses to the murder, Lynley has his doubts.
8	2	"In the Presence of the Enemy"	Brian Stirner	Francesca Brill	17 March 2003	6.64m
The conservative editor of a major newspaper, Dennis Luxford, receives a ransom demand: publish the details of his first-born child or else. Some years earlier, he had a weekend tryst with a left-wing politician, Eve Bowen, now a government Minister, and by mutual agreement his paternity has never been publicly acknowledged. In a strange twist, the girl is killed before Luxford has a chance to publish the story. Lynley and Havers are soon dealing with another kidnapping when Luxford's young son Leo is taken and he again received the same ransom demand.
9	3	"A Suitable Vengeance"	Edward Bennett	Valerie Windsor	24 March 2003	6.44m
Lynley and Helen's weekend away on the family estate to celebrate their engagement party descends into disaster when local shopkeeper Mick Cambrey is found dead in his shop in the village - and the local police arrest Cambrey's father-in-law, John Penellin, who is also Lynley's long-time estate manager. Lynley and Havers soon determine that the death is related to drug smuggling, but when one of the weekend guests, Justin Brooke, is found dead on the estate, they realize something other than heroin was being smuggled.
10	4	"Deception on His Mind"	Tim Leandro	Valerie Windsor	31 March 2003	6.19m
Lynley and Havers investigate the death of Hatham Kureshi in the seaside village of Balford-le-nez. He was to marry Shala Malik, the daughter of a prominent businessman. The marriage was an arranged one, but it turns out she was having an affair with a local man, Theo Shaw, and that she is also pregnant. There is also much tension in the community owing to what some claim was a previous incident where the police supposedly covered up the murder of a 16-year-old Asian boy. When Lynley learns that Hatham was also gay, it adds a whole new angle to the investigation.

=== Series 3 (2004) ===
No. overall	No. in series	Title	Directed by	Written by	Original release date	Viewers (millions)
11	1	"In Pursuit of the Proper Sinner"	Sebastian Graham Jones	Ann Marie Di-Mambro	4 March 2004	6.51m
Lynley investigates the death of Nicola Maiden and Gerry Cole, who were beaten to death while out camping. Nicola's father Andy Maiden is a retired police officer but neither of her parents know, or will admit to knowing, who Cole is and thought she was seeing Julian Britton. Andy believes she was killed as a means of getting back at him and offers to go through his old files. The investigation reveals that Nicola worked for Martin Reeve, the owner of an escort agency. She had recently quit and set off on her own. Andy had also put him away once, for 10 years, leading to the break-up of Reeve's marriage. When another murder occurs, it sends the investigation in a different direction involving a theft and blackmail.
12	2	"A Traitor to Memory"	Brian Stirner	Kevin Clarke	11 March 2004	6.31m
While attending an anniversary party at his superior officer's house, Lynley is given the task of investigating the death by car of a woman. He and Havers think it odd that he is given the case, but he doggedly pursues the truth. The woman was the mother of a gifted violinist who mysteriously abandoned his concert just at the time his mother was run down. As the plot deepens, connections to a crime 20 years earlier appear and tensions between Lynley and a fellow policeman boil over.
13	3	"A Cry for Justice"	Alrick Riley	Ann Marie Di-Mambro	18 March 2004	6.15m
Havers is re-appointed to her rank of Detective Sergeant, and she and Lynley are assigned to investigate the murder of Morag McNicholl. The killing was made to look like a suicide, but it is clear she was killed by a blow to the head and that her wrists were slit after her death. Lynley also finds a large amount of cash in the flat, so he rules out robbery as a motive. After discovering the dead woman was membership secretary at a prestigious private club, Havers goes undercover to see what information she can glean.
14	4	"If Wishes Were Horses"	Alrick Riley	Simon Booker	25 March 2004	5.88m
Lynley and Havers investigate the murder of a forensic psychologist, Professor Dermot Finnegan, who was blown to pieces with a car bomb. During his time in office, he completed much work for the police and the list of those seeking revenge is endless - in his home village, Noel Shakespeare's daughter was imprisoned for killing her abusive husband following Finnegan's testimony, and he has campaigned relentlessly to get her a new trial. Peter Stephanopoulos, who also served 10 years largely on Finnegan's testimony, has now been released.

=== Series 4 (2005) ===
No. overall	No. in series	Title	Directed by	Written by	Original release date	Viewers (millions)
15	1	"In Divine Proportion"	Brian Stirner	Julian Simpson	17 March 2005	5.93m
Lynley and Havers are sent to a small village in East Anglia to investigate the murder of an interior designer who was shot inside her house, but her body was deliberately moved outside. As the investigation proceeds, they discover that the dead woman's sister was raped and committed suicide fifteen years earlier, and the perpetrator mysteriously disappeared. These events are somehow connected to the current crime but the perpetrator's son refuses to co-operate with the investigation and attempts suicide to avoid doing so. As the pair close in on the murderer, Havers becomes trapped in the local pub with several villagers and the murderer.
16	2	"In the Guise of Death"	Nigel Douglas	Simon Block	24 March 2005	6.25m
Lynley is visiting the family estate with his sister, while Havers is also on leave and attending an holistic retreat. But they're soon drawn in by the local police to assist with the suspicious death of Stephen Fenner, who is found hanging in his barn. The post-mortem reveals that he was drugged and the suspicious death is soon a murder investigation. Fenner had recently been on the wrong end of a business deal having bought a lame racehorse. The investigation reveals however that there is a smuggling ring operating along the Cornish coast and Fenner may have been involved. A key suspect and a police officer will die however before Lynley and Havers identify the ringleader.
17	3	"The Seed of Cunning"	Jeremy Silberston	Mark Greig	31 March 2005	6.88m
When the body of a doorkeeper in the House of Lords is found floating in the Thames, Lynley gets a chance to reunite with an old school mate, who heads a powerful committee deciding what missile defense system to buy. Havers, impressed with the setting, spends her nights meeting men through a dating service.
18	4	"Word of God"	Julian Simpson	Peter Jukes	7 April 2005	6.34m
When the police discover the body of a man frozen in a meat truck, they think they have a case of people smuggling. The man had a false British passport in his possession and his death had similarities to a previous smuggling operation gone wrong. However the autopsy reveals that he was actually strangled. They also find a page from a Koran that proves to be extremely valuable. The immigration authorities, however, show little interest in Lynley and Havers' murder investigation.

=== Series 5 (2006) ===
No. overall	No. in series	Title	Directed by	Written by	Original release date	Viewers (millions)
19	1	"Natural Causes"	Simon Massey	Peter Jukes	20 July 2006	5.22m
Lynley finds himself suspended from duty accused of having threatened a witness. As a result, Havers is temporarily re-assigned to DI Fiona Knight. They look into the murder of Edie Covington who was found dead in her car at the bottom of a lake. Edie was well known to many in the local area and had incurred the wrath of Owen Hardourt-Baines, a local land developer who had hoped to develop the lakeside into a housing estate. The police think they have a motive and forensic evidence that points to a killer, but in the end must look elsewhere. Although suspended, Lynley can't help but involve himself in the case.
20	2	"One Guilty Deed"	Jonathan Fox Bassett	Mark Greig	27 July 2006	5.24m
Roger Pollard was a member of a London criminal gang run by Michael Shand. When Pollard is found on a beach shot through the head, Lynley and Havers assume Shand is responsible. They are surprised however to learn that Pollard had grown up locally, making him an easy target for anyone trying to learn his whereabouts. Havers is in her element as she used to go to a holiday camp in the area as a child. She becomes convinced that the death of a young boy from the holiday camp, Martin McRae, some twenty years before is the key to solving the crime.
21	3	"Chinese Walls"	Robert Bierman	Ed Whitmore	3 August 2006	6.03m
Emily Proctor, a 23-year-old student, is found stabbed to death in Hyde Park. She had recently obtained a first in law and was a pupil in the Chambers of well-known barrister Tony Wainwright. At age 13, Emily had first seen Wainwright in a television documentary about refugees and had always wanted to work with him. As Lynley and Havers look into her background, however, they are able to paint a more complex picture of the victim. She had recently reunited with her half-sister and was involved in the online sex industry. When the police learn that Wainwright's fiancé was killed a few days before his wedding 15 years earlier, the investigation takes a new direction.
22	4	"In the Blink of an Eye"	Brian Kelly	Ed Whitmore	10 August 2006	5.69m
Lynley and Havers investigate the murder of Peter Rooker, a press photographer who was killed in an alley way. Rooker had been a successful war photographer in Bosnia but in recent years had been trying his hand at being a paparazzo. Rooker was also selling his photos to Melissa Booth, the editor of a major tabloid newspaper and his one time lover, now married to Eddie Price a very powerful business man. When the police determine that they were having an affair, Price becomes their principal suspect but he has a solid alibi for the time of Rooker's murder.

=== Series 6 (2008) ===
The broadcast of Limbo and Know Thine Enemy was initially postponed: they were due to air on 9 and 16 August 2007 respectively but did not air as scheduled. Their premiere broadcast came on 11 and 18 November 2007 on BBC Entertainment, before being broadcast on BBC One for the first time on 25 May and 1 June 2008 respectively.

No. overall	No. in series	Title	Directed by	Written by	Original release date	Viewers (millions)
23	1	"Limbo"	Robert Bierman	Ed Whitmore	11 November 2007 (BBC Entertainment); 25 May 2008 (BBC One)	4.87m
Lynley is at a birthday party for the young son of some friends when the boy disappears. Twelve years later the boy's corpse is found and Lynley travels to Rome to accompany the dead boy's sister back to England for the funeral. However, the past seems to haunt her, and a break-in at her apartment leads Lynley to suspect that the 12-year-old crime is still reverberating through the victim's family. At the same time, Lynley is also dealing with the death of Helen - and not too well, tending to drown his sorrows rather than deal with the loss.
24	2	"Know Thine Enemy"	Graham Theakston	Ed Whitmore	18 November 2007 (BBC Entertainment); 1 June 2008 (BBC One)	5.30m
Lynley and Havers investigate the death of teenager Sarah Middleton, who had gone missing two weeks previously. She was found in a lake and had been dead for three or four days. She had also been sexually assaulted. When a second schoolgirl, Kelly Stevens, also goes missing the police fear they have a predator on their hands. The police focus on Guy Thompson, who had recently beaten his wife, Tanya. Havers works on gaining the wife's trust, while Lynley learns more about the husband's troubled background. As they continue the investigation, there is growing doubt as to just who is the most dangerous.: Based on true events in Ontario, Canada, where married couple Paul Bernardo and Karla Homolka video recorded the sexual torture of teens Leslie Mahaffy and Kristen French, both later murdered. Homolka's sister Tammy was also a birthday "gift" for Bernardo, drugged and raped, and accidentally choking to death. The video tapes were found when Homolka made a plea deal after being assaulted by Bernardo.

== International broadcasts ==
In the United States, all six series were broadcast on PBS from 2002 to 2008.

- A Great Deliverance was broadcast on the series Mystery! in two parts as Inspector Lynley I on 19 and 26 August 2002.
- Series 1 was shown on Mystery! as Inspector Lynley II on 31 August and 7, 14, and 21 September 2003.
- Series 2 was shown on Mystery! as Inspector Lynley III on 5, 12, 19, and 26 September 2004.
- Series 3 was shown on Mystery! as Inspector Lynley IV on 26 June and 3, 10, and 17 July 2005.
- Series 4 was shown on Mystery! as Inspector Lynley V on 10, 17, 24 September, and 1 October 2006.
- Series 5 was shown on Mystery! as Inspector Lynley VI on 9 and 16 September and 7 and 14 October 2007.

Episode 4 was the final broadcast of Mystery! before WGBH retooled the classic anthology series, along with Masterpiece Theatre, into Masterpiece.

- Series 6 was shown on Masterpiece Mystery! as Inspector Lynley VII on 10 and 17 August 2008.

In December 2014, Knowledge Network began broadcasting the series from the beginning in Canada.

== Home media ==
DVD title	Region 2	Region 4
The Complete First Series	3 July 2006	2 April 2008 September 14, 2016 (Re-Release)
The Complete Second Series	21 April 2008	6 May 2010 September 14, 2016 (Re-Release)
The Complete Third Series	15 March 2009	1 May 2013 September 14, 2016 (Re-Release)
The Complete Fourth Series	1 June 2009	6 November 2013 September 14, 2016 (Re-Release)
The Complete Fifth Series	5 October 2009	14 September 2016
The Complete Sixth Series	10 May 2010	14 September 2016
The Complete First & Second Series	14 April 2014	N/A
The Complete Third & Fourth Series	14 April 2014	N/A
The Complete Fifth & Sixth Series	14 April 2014	N/A
The Complete Inspector Lynley Mysteries	14 April 2014	14 September 2016

== Reboot ==
"Lynley", a new adaptation of the books, started streaming on BritBox in September 2025. It is written by Steve Thompson and directed by Ed Bazalgette. Leo Suter stars as Lynley, whilst Havers is played by Sofia Barclay. The first series comprises four 90-minute episodes.
