= M. M. Robinson High School =

M.M. Robinson High School
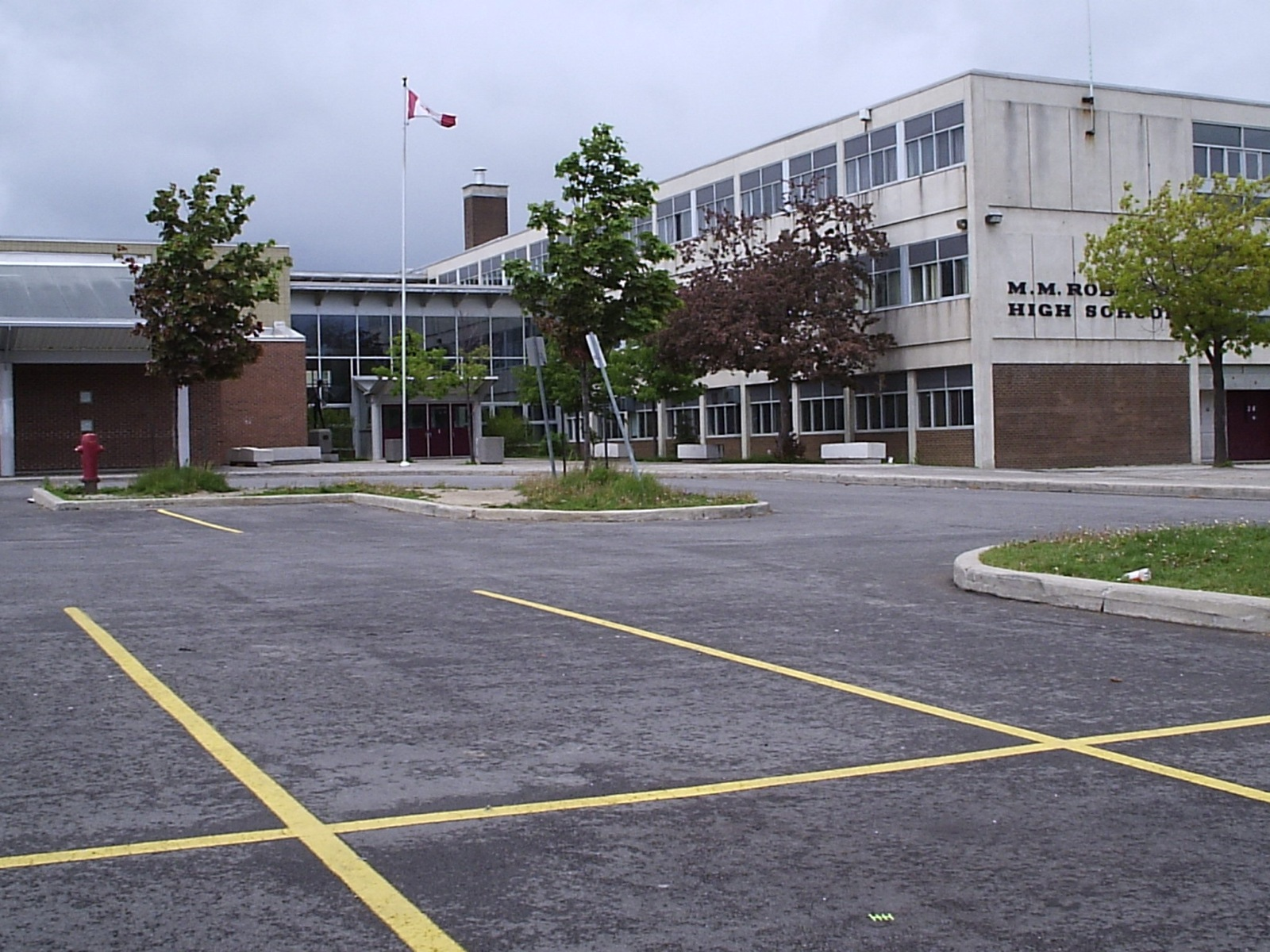

Location
- 2425 Upper Middle Road; Burlington, Ontario, L7P 3N9; Canada; 43.3638°N 79.8249°W

Information
- School type: Public High School
- Motto: Per Ardua Ad Scientiam (Through Hard Work, Knowledge)
- Founded: 1963
- School board: Halton District School Board
- Area trustee: Andrea Grebenc
- Principal: Nicholas Varricchio
- Grades: 9 to 12
- Enrolment: 1200+ (2022)
- Language: English, French Immersion
- Area: Halton
- Colours: Maroon and gold
- Mascot: Ram (Nicknamed "Rammy Z. McRamhead")
- Team name: M.M. Robinson Rams
- Feeder schools: Rolling Meadows, Brant Hills, C.H. Norton, Sir Ernest Macmillan
- Website: mmr.hdsb.ca

M.M. Robinson High School is a high school located in Burlington, Ontario, Canada. It is administered by the Halton District School Board. According to the 2023-2024 preliminary register, there are approx. 1200 students attending MMR with programs addressing all Pathways.

Opened in 1963, the school is named after Melville Marks Robinson, then recently chair of the Burlington High School Board. Notably, he was also the founder of the British Empire Games, now the Commonwealth Games.

In fall 2018, staff and students from Lester B. Pearson High School were transferred to the school as LBP had closed.

== Academics ==
Students opt for a variety of pathways, with approximately 80% traditionally going to university, 15% going to college, and the remaining 5% going to the workplace. The school has a notable French immersion program and Ontario Youth Apprenticeship Program (OYAP).

== Athletics ==
The mascot of the school teams is a ram, and school colours are maroon and gold. During the 2005–2006 school year the mascot uniform was taken by a graduating honours student as a year-end prank. It was later returned anonymously post commencement.

The school has a successful baseball program and two students, Mark McDonald and Paul McDonald were drafted in 2001 for the Toronto Blue Jays.

In 1990 Boys Baseball won the Blue Jay Cup Championship at Skydome.

The Varsity Boys Baseball team won the Halton Secondary School Athletic Association (HSSAA) Championship in 2007, 2008 and 2010, as well as in the Tier 2 Division in 2026.

The Senior Men's basketball team won the Halton Championships in 1991.

The Senior Men's hockey team won the silver medal at OFSAA in 1987.

The Men's hockey team were Peel Halton Champions in 1970-71.

The Senior Men's football team made their OFSAA Golden Horseshoe Bowl finals debut in 2012. They lost to the Lakeshore Catholic Gators of Port Colborne by a score of 29–28, despite leading 21–8 at halftime.

The Robinson Rams have a long history of football alumni going on to play in university or professionally, this list extended in 2016 as AJ Allen signed his Letter of Intent to play with the University of Guelph Gryphons football program. Allen was the 35th overall selection for the 2020 CFL Draft, by the Saskatchewan Roughriders.

== MMRambotics ==
MM Robinson's FIRST Robotics team was founded June, 2006 by students Jason Patel and Matthew Gardner. The team participates in events around the Greater Toronto Area, with the notable exception being their regular appearances at the Durham College event. Some of the teams notable accomplishments are:

- Rookie Inspiration Award - 2007
- Silver Medal at Halton Skills Competition - 2007
- Silver Medal at Halton Skills Competition - 2008
- Semi-Finalist at Waterloo regional - 2008
- Judges Award at Waterloo regional - 2009
- Finalist at Waterloo regional - 2009
- Quarter-Finalist at Toronto regional - 2009
- Quarter-Finalist at Waterloo - 2010
- Judges Award, Waterloo Regional - 2011
- Winners, Greater Toronto West Regional - 2012
- Creativity Award, Pine Tree Regional - 2013
- Team Spirit Award; Innovation in Control Award, North Bay Regional - 2014
- Excellence in Engineering Award, Palmetto Regional - 2014
- Quality Award; North Bay Regional - 2015
- Quality Award; Palmetto Regional Event - 2016
- Finalist at FIRST Ontario Provincial Championship - 2017
- Finalist at FIRST Ontario Provincial Championship - 2018
- winners at Durham College District Even - 2019
- Finalist at FIRST Ontario Provincial Championship - 2019
- Quarter-Finalist at Daly Division World Championships - 2019
- winners at Durham College District Even - 2020
- Winners at Humber College District Event - 2022
- Finalist at Waterloo District Event - 2022
- Winners at Newmarket Complex District - 2023
- Winners at FIRST Ontario Provincial Championship - 2023
- Innovation in Control Award; FIRST Ontario Provincial Championship - 2023
- Winners at McMaster University Event - 2024

== MM Robinson Drumline ==
The MM Robinson Drumline was started in 2007 by Carolyn French and Andrew Thies. What started as a small group of students who met in the cafeteria and practiced on drum pads to an award winning ensemble that performed in events throughout Southern Ontario. Events included the Ontario Music Educators Association Conference, the Olympic Torch Relay in Hamilton, the Toronto Rock Home Opener at the ACC, [Breakfast Television] and the opening of the 2015 Juno Awards in Hamilton Ontario. The drumline also competed in the Ontario Drumline Association, as well as the US WGI Percussion Circuit. Unfortunately, the program ended in 2017 after a lack of funding and support from the Halton District School Board.

== Notable events ==
Stephen Lewis, who gave a passionate speech about the crisis of the AIDS pandemic in Africa at MMR on March 5, 2007, was presented with a cheque for over $15,000. The money was raised by MMR students through activities in school and in the community at large. By March 2007 students had raised $25,000 for charity, including $15,185.50 for the Stephen Lewis Foundation's fund to assist African women raising grandchildren orphaned by AIDS.

== Notable alumni and alumna ==
- Warren Adelman, former CEO, GoDaddy group of companies
- A. J. Allen, CFL player
- Tad Crawford - 2002 Graduate - A safety for the BC Lions
- Angela Coughlan - Former Olympic swimmer
- Nicole Dorsey, screenwriter and director
- Karina Gould, Member of Parliament for Burlington (2015–Present), former Government House Leader (2023–2025), Minister of International Development (2019–2021), Minister of Democratic Institutions (2017–2019), candidate in the 2025 Liberal Party leadership election
- Oskar Johansson - 1996 Graduate - Gold Medal - 1999 Pan Am Games, Olympian Athens 2004 (15th) and Beijing 2008 (4th), Silver Medal 2008 World Championships - Sailing
- Leslie Mahaffy, murder victim of Paul Bernardo and Karla Homolka
- Dave Ridgway, a placekicker for the Saskatchewan Roughriders and Hall of Famer
- Mike "Beard Guy" Taylor, keyboardist Walk Off The Earth
- Matthew Gardner, Founder, Videostream and RouteThis
- Reg Denis, graduated 1968, Member of “Crackers” rock group
- Renata Fast, Olympic hockey player
- Tina Jung, actress

== See also ==
- Education in Ontario
- List of secondary schools in Ontario
