= Sir Winston Churchill Secondary School (St. Catharines, Ontario) =

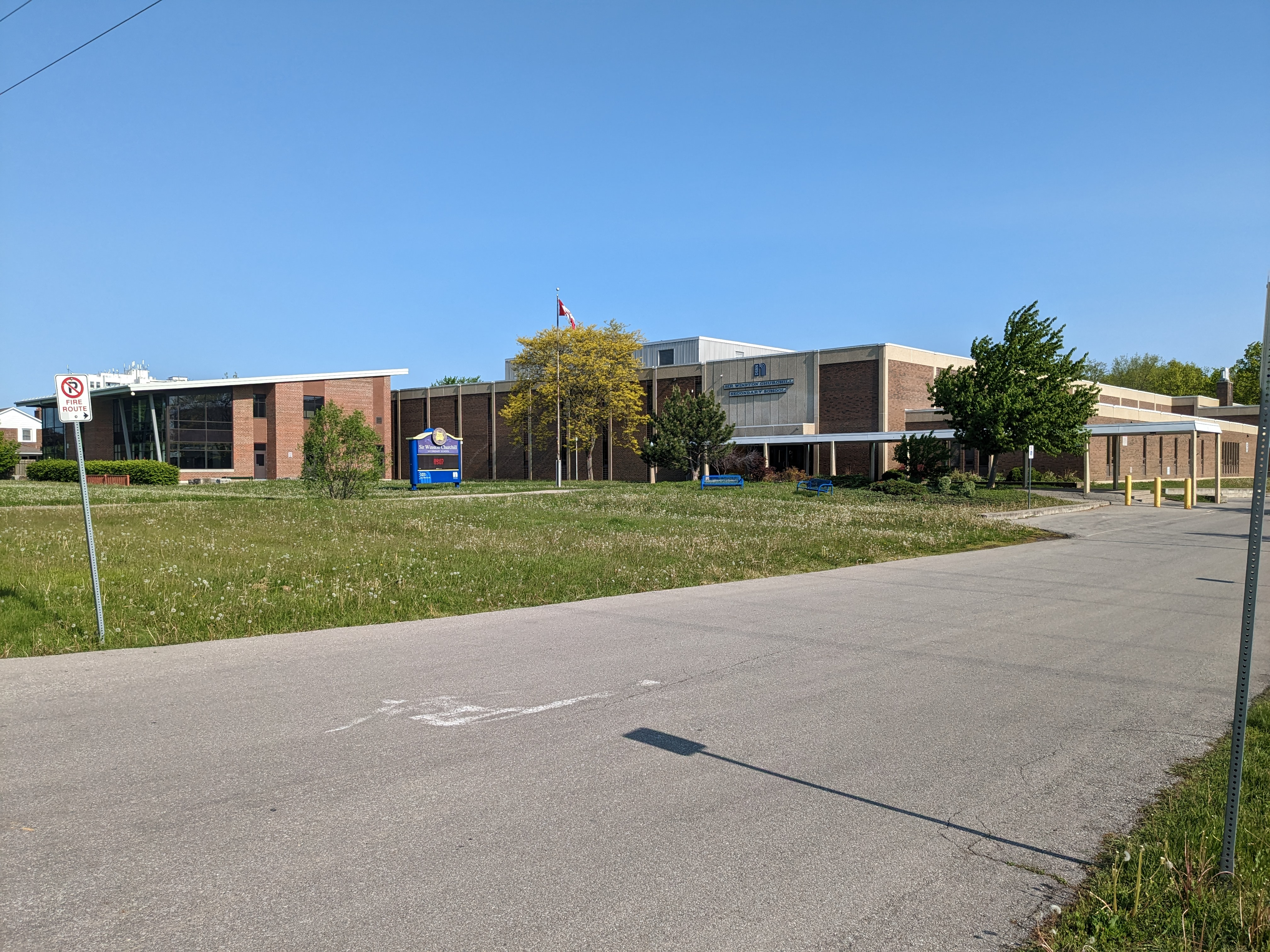

Location
- 101 Glen Morris Drive; St. Catharines, Ontario, L2T 2N1; Canada; 43.14053°N 79.227819°W

Information
- School type: Secondary school
- Motto: Latin: Facta non verba ("Deeds, not words")
- Established: 1959
- School board: District School Board of Niagara
- School number: 238
- Principal: Matt Wilson
- Vice-principal: Jessica Bell
- Grades: 9–12
- Enrolment: Approx. 1000 students
- Language: English; French
- Campus type: Suburban
- Colours: Navy blue and gold
- Mascot: Bulldog
- Community: Glenridge
- Website: sirwinston.dsbn.org

Sir Winston Churchill Secondary School is a Canadian secondary school located in St. Catharines, Ontario. It is one of eight public secondary schools in the city, and is situated in the community of Glenridge. The secondary school is known for their competitive sports, extremely strong academics, arts, their bulldog mascot and extensive list of extracurriculars. It is administered by the District School Board of Niagara.

== History ==
Sir Winston was founded in 1959. It was named after the British Prime Minister, who led the United Kingdom through the Second World War.

== Extended French program ==
Sir Winston Churchill's Extended French program has been in existence for over 30 years. The school offers the program through grades 9 to 12 to students who participated in Extended French previously in elementary school. Twelve of the forty credits that an Extended French student completes will be taught in French. These are mainly core subjects like French, Math, Science and Social Sciences.

== Sports ==
Sir Winston Churchill offers several extracurricular sports activities to its students, including football, swimming, cross country running, track and field, volleyball, basketball, soccer, lacrosse, hockey, badminton, rowing, and others. The Sir Winston Churchill Sr. Football team won the Niagara Regional High School Championship in the 2024 season.

== Notable alumni ==
- Malin Akerman, actress and model
- Jeffrey Finley, CFL former defensive lineman for the Montreal Alouettes
- Tammy Homolka (grade 10 student at death, 24 December 1990), died after being raped by Karla Homolka and Paul Bernardo
- Karla Homolka, wife and accomplice of Paul Bernardo
- Paul Jenkins, economist, former Senior Deputy Governor and former Chief Operating Officer of the Bank of Canada
- Keith Makubuya, professional soccer player
- Lauren Riihimaki, YouTuber
- Emma Ferreira, Actress
- Kristen Kit, Olympic Rower
- Imane Anys, "Pokimane" Twitch streamer and influencer,

== See also ==
- District School Board of Niagara
- Education in Ontario
- Extended French program
- List of secondary schools in Ontario
