= Marotta Hospital =

Healthcare facility in St. Catharines, Ontario, Canada

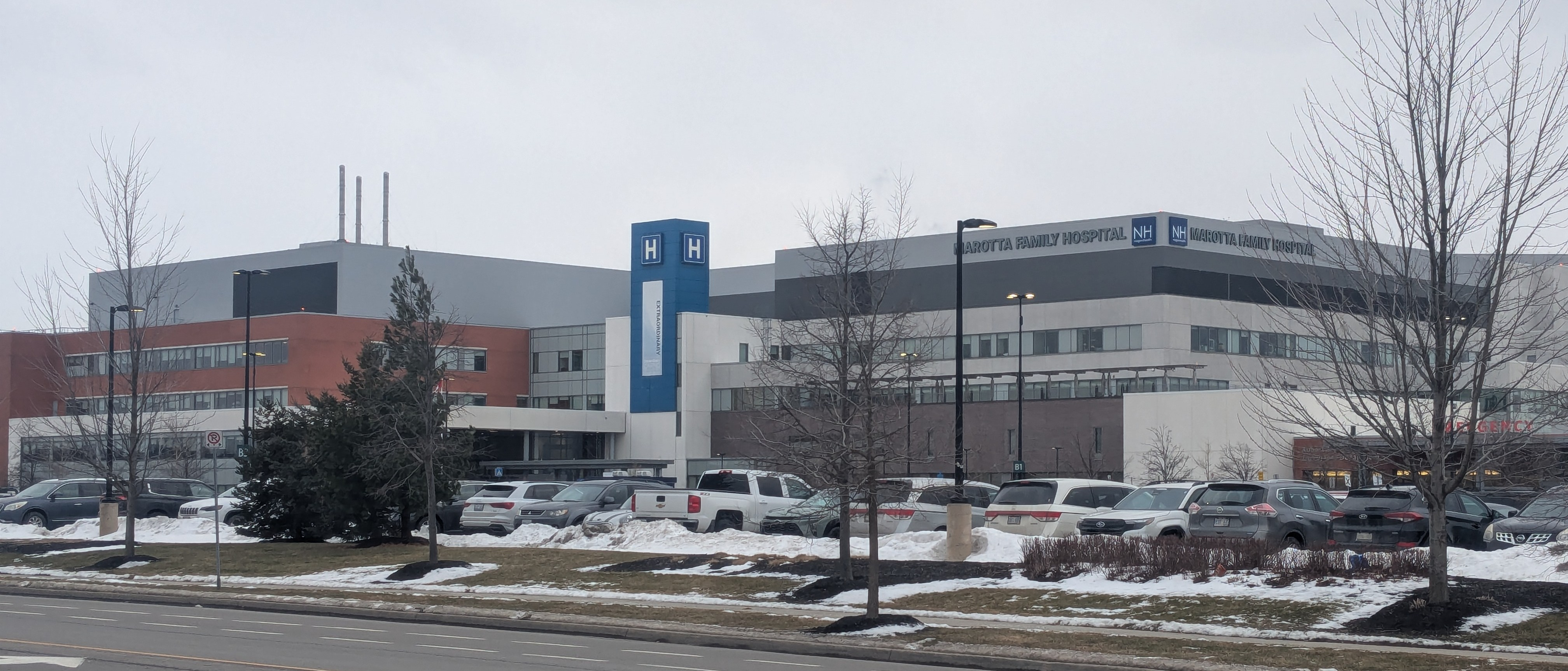
The hospital in 2025

The Marotta Family Hospital is a healthcare facility in St. Catharines, Ontario, Canada, that opened in 2013. It replaces the St. Catharines General Hospital, which closed the same year. The hospital was originally known as the St. Catharines Site before being renamed in 2024.

== History ==
During the COVID-19 pandemic in Ontario, hospitalizations for patients with respiratory issues led to a larger volume of patients, causing the hospital to operate beyond its full capacity. An outbreak was declared at the hospital after five employees became infected. In January 2024, the Marotta family made a $15 million donation to the St. Catharines hospital, which was then renamed in their honour. In June 2024, the hospital commissioned artwork from Indigenous artists for their mental health wards. In September 2024, a Ronald McDonald House room opened within the hospital.

== Incidents ==
In 2020, a security guard was filmed throwing a man out of a wheelchair. This incident was posted on social media and prompted a police investigation. In 2021, a 24 year old indigenous woman died while receiving treatment for back pain at the hospital. Two separate investigations were made surrounding the circumstances of her death, which reached contradictory conclusions. After her death, the hospital created a plan to provide indigenous patients with adequate care. In October 2024, a lawsuit was filed after a patient was allegedly given ten times their prescribed dose of antipsychotic medication and died of cardiac arrest. In November 2024, a new patient information system was installed, which cost $125 million. The transition into using it and resulting technical issues led to extensive delays in treating patients.
