= Murder of Cecilia Zhang =

2003 child murder in Ontario, Canada

- Cecilia Zhang, c. summer of 2003
- Location: Toronto, Ontario, Canada
- Date: October 20, 2003
- Attack type: Abduction and second degree murder
- Deaths: 1
- Victim: Cecilia Zhang
- Perpetrator: Min Chen

Cecilia Zhang
- Simplified Chinese: 张东岳
- Traditional Chinese: 張東嶽
Transcriptions
Standard Mandarin
- Hanyu Pinyin: Zhāng Dōngyuè
- Wade–Giles: Chang Tong-yüe

Cecilia Zhang (also known as Dong-Yue Zhang; March 30, 1994 – October 20, 2003) was a nine-year-old child from Toronto, Ontario, Canada who went missing on October 20, 2003. After being missing for five months, her body was discovered by the Credit River in Mississauga on March 27, 2004. Min Chen, a Chinese citizen from Shanghai who was in Canada on a visa, was arrested. He pleaded guilty to second-degree murder on May 9, 2006. Chen confessed that he was kidnapping for ransom and her death was accidental.

== Background ==
Zhang was nine years old at the time of her abduction and murder. She was born on March 30, 1994, to her parents, Raymond Zhang and Sherry Xu, who came from Jiangsu and arrived in Canada in 1998. She was in grade 4 and enrolled at the Seneca Hill Public School in a gifted program. Her parents reportedly did not let her play alone without supervision on the front lawn of their house.

Min Chen (Note: simplified Chinese: 陈敏; traditional Chinese: 陳敏; pinyin: Chén Mǐn; Wade–Giles: Chen Min) (born January 30, 1983) is a Chinese native from Shanghai who had been living in Canada on a visa since 2001. His father is an airline executive and his mother is a police officer in Shanghai. They were giving him money in the course of the kidnapping.

At the time of Zhang's kidnapping, Chen had stopped his studying English at Seneca College Newnham Campus, which is near Zhang's home in Toronto, Ontario. Chen also had not completed his grade 12 courses at a local private academy. According to police, Min Chen knew a female boarder who had lived at the Zhang home between September 2002 and March 2003 and had visited the Zhang home at least four times. Police said that Cecilia would have been comfortable in Chen's company under normal social circumstances.

== Abduction ==
According to an agreed statement of facts read out in a Brampton, Ontario courthouse, Chen was failing in his college studies and feared deportation back to his native China. Being a broke visa student, he desperately needed $25,000 to enter into a marriage of convenience as a means of becoming a permanent resident in Canada. Chen entered Zhang's home through a kitchen window and removed her from her home between 3:00 AM and 4:00 AM, leaving by a side door. When Cecilia tried to scream, Chen covered her face with a towel and held his hand over her mouth. Cecilia had stopped struggling by the time Chen placed her inside the trunk of his car. When Chen checked on Cecilia later on, he discovered that she had stopped breathing. According to Chen, Cecilia's death was the result of Chen's poorly planned kidnapping and not deliberate.

The highly decomposed remains of Cecilia Zhang were subsequently found by a hiker in a wooded area of Mississauga by the Credit River at Eglinton Avenue on Saturday, March 27, 2004. Investigators were unable to determine the cause of death and were unable to determine if she had been sexually assaulted due to the advanced decomposition.

== Trial ==
Peel Regional Police had received a complaint about potential illegal fishing in the area on Sept. 18, 2003 near where the body was discovered. His fingerprints were also found on a window screen of Zhang's house.

Min Chen was arrested and charged with first degree murder. Chen was represented by criminal lawyer John Rosen, who had previously defended serial killer and serial rapist Paul Bernardo. Min Chen pleaded guilty to second-degree murder on May 9, 2006. He was sentenced to life imprisonment; under the faint hope clause then in effect, he was given the right to apply for parole after 15 years.

During sentencing, Justice Bruce Durno, who presided over the case, questioned Chen's explanation of the events. He stated: “This was not an accidental killing in the course of a bungled kidnapping”.

Lacking an extradition treaty between the governments of Canada and the People's Republic of China, human rights lawyers have noted that under Chinese law, when Chen completes his sentence and is deported back to China, he will likely face a second trial and sentence in China. Canadian law forbids this practice, known as double jeopardy, while Chinese law permits it if a Chinese resident commits a crime on foreign soil. Trial and punishment in the other country is seen as a mitigating factor, but does not preclude further imprisonment or execution in the People's Republic of China.

== See also ==
- List of kidnappings
- List of solved missing person cases (2000s)
- Murder of Amanda Zhao
