= Karla (film) =

2006 American psychological thriller film

- Theatrical release poster
- Directed by: Joel Bender
- Written by: Joel Bender; Manette Rosen; Michael D. Sellers
- Produced by: Marlon Parry; Michael D. Sellers
- Starring: Laura Prepon; Misha Collins; Tess Harper; Leonard Kelly-Young; Alex Boyd; Anthony Denison; Patrick Bauchau
- Cinematography: Charles Mills
- Edited by: Joel Bender; Michael D. Sellers
- Music by: Tim Jones
- Production companies: MovieBank; MB Partners; Goldmill Productions; Quantum Entertainment
- Distributed by: Christal Films; Quantum Entertainment
- Release date: January 20, 2006 (Canada)
- Running time: 102 minutes
- Country: United States
- Language: English
- Budget: $10 million

Karla is a 2006 American psychological thriller film written and directed by Joel Bender, and co-written by Manette Rosen and Michael D. Sellers. It is based on the crimes of Canadian serial killers Paul Bernardo and Karla Homolka and stars Misha Collins and Laura Prepon as Bernardo and Homolka.

== Plot ==
On 11 May 2000, a psychologist, Dr. Arnold, is conducting a session with Karla Homolka at Canada's Regional Psychiatric Centre in Saskatoon, Saskatchewan. Dr. Arnold's evaluation will determine Karla's eligibility for parole. During the session, Dr. Arnold shows Karla a photo album of herself, and her husband, Paul Bernardo, in happier times. Karla has a memory of how they first met. However, when Dr. Arnold introduces the subject of Karla's sister, Tammy Homolka, Karla becomes uncooperative.

Over the following weeks, Dr. Arnold probes Karla about her knowledge of Paul's secret life as a serial rapist. It is revealed that shortly before their marriage, Paul began to rape women. Paul convinced Karla to help him rape Tammy on camera. At first Karla disagrees, but eventually steals Halcion from the veterinary clinic where she works.

Tammy gets drunk at a Christmas party and becomes unresponsive after the two drug her. Tammy is raped, and ends up getting sick while drugged, choking on her own vomit. Karla calls 911, but Tammy dies and the two hide the assault evidence so her death would appear accidental. Afterwards, Paul beats Karla. Karla learns never to ruin Paul's "movies."

Karla tells Dr. Arnold that Paul became obsessed with Tammy, and kept watching the video after her death, even showing it to friends. Paul also threatened to reveal Karla's role in her sister's murder, if he should get into any more trouble, but Karla finally leaves him anyway. Paul is open with Karla about his crimes yet Karla does not object even when Paul begins to bring his victims home. Although disturbed at that part of Paul's life, Karla accepts it, later claiming she, too, would have been killed if she hadn't. At Paul's request, Karla hesitantly participates in these assaults.

Paul kidnaps a young girl named Tina and forces her to undress on camera. Karla witnesses this, but is too afraid to tell anyone. Tina is held for 3 days, and is raped repeatedly while Karla is "forced" to videotape it all. During one such assault, Paul strangles Tina after she sees his face. Karla tries to convince him not to kill her, but he insists, telling her that Tina can identify them both.

He cuts the body into pieces and seals them in cement blocks, which he then dumps into a lake. On the day of Paul and Karla's wedding, the girl's body is discovered, and identified by dental records. Paul stops raping and abducting for a time, but his anxiety and pent-up frustration cause him to become violent toward Karla. Paul's friends see the change in his personality and break off from him. Meanwhile Karla, suffering from the abuse and desperate to reclaim his affections, helps Paul abduct and rape another young girl named Kaitlyn.

Kaitlyn is brutally raped by Paul. Karla watches the assault and begins to cry. Paul beats Karla and tells her that she is ruining his movie again. After Paul leaves, Karla is put in charge of Kaitlyn. Kaitlyn tells Karla that she is a victim too, and that this is not her fault. When asked why she stays, Karla simply says, "You don't understand." Karla claims to Dr. Arnold that she wanted to free Kaitlyn, but was afraid Paul would kill her if she did.

Kaitlyn's disappearance immediately attracts a storm of media and police attention, so Paul kills her, to be rid of her. As part of the investigation, the police arrive at Paul's house. Paul is very cooperative so the police leave satisfied, but, afterwards, he beats Karla mercilessly. Karla takes refuge with friends before reporting the assault. Paul is then booked under domestic violence but is released after only one night in jail.

Back at the Regional Psychiatric Centre, Dr. Arnold asks Karla about her relationship with her younger sister, Tammy, and her jealousy towards her, because of Paul's attraction to her. Karla confesses that Paul wanted to take Tammy's virginity and that he wanted Karla to "give" Tammy to him. Karla agreed to help him rape her sister.

Shortly thereafter, the DNA samples Paul provided as part of the Scarborough rape investigation, are matched to the evidence found on one of the murder victims. Both Paul and Karla are subsequently arrested. During the trial, Paul testifies that Karla killed Kaitlyn Ross with a mallet. Karla denies all the killings. Paul is convicted on two counts of murder without any possibility of parole. Karla is given a sentence of twelve years in exchange for a guilty plea for manslaughter.

A note explains that Karla's parole was denied, as the psychologist found her artificial, manipulative, and without remorse.

== Cast ==
- Laura Prepon as Karla Homolka
- Misha Collins as Paul Bernardo
- Patrick Bauchau as Doctor Arnold
- Emilie Jacobs as Peggy
- Alex Boyd as Nick
- Carole Ita White as Waitress
- Shawn Hoffman as Detective Kirby
- Adam Lieberman as Detective Morgan
- Cherilyn Hayres as Tammy Homolka
- William Duffy as Detective Porter
- Kristen Honey as Tina McCarthy
- Tess Harper as Molly Czehowicz
- Leonard Kelly-Young as Dan Czehowicz
- Anna Pheil as Patricia
- Zack DiLiberto as Doug
- Nikki McCauley as Jessie
- Sarah Foret as Kaitlyn Ross
- Anthony Denison as Detective Burroughs
- Jeff Doucette as Burroughs' Partner
- Bunny Gibson as Mrs. Ross
- Bradford English as Mr. Ross
- John Ross Clark as Attorney Warner
- Brandon Routh as Tim
- Philippe Bergeron as Attorney Siegel
- Eileen Dietz as Helen
- Ross Patterson as Steve

== Production ==
The film was originally titled Deadly but was retitled Karla before its release. The script is based on court transcriptions, interviews and video shot by Homolka and Bernardo.

== Release ==
The film caused significant controversy in Canada, where the families of victims Kristen French and Leslie Mahaffy initially said that the film exploited the memory of their daughters. Politicians in the Legislative Assembly of Ontario, including Attorney General Michael Bryant, called for a boycott of the film, and one Canadian theatre chain, Cineplex Odeon, stated that it would show the film only in its major urban markets in Toronto, Ontario, Montreal, Quebec, Ottawa, Ontario, and Winnipeg, Manitoba. The film was booked to debut at the 2005 Montreal World Film Festival, until a protest by Air Canada, a corporate sponsor of the festival, shelved the idea.

Lawyer Tim Danson, who represented the French and Mahaffy families, watched a private screening of the film in September with the families in attendance. The following month, he announced that the families would not oppose the film's Canadian release.

== Reception ==
On the review aggregator website Rotten Tomatoes, 0% of 10 critics' reviews are positive, with an average rating of 4.1/10.

Karla was deemed "a creepy but botched work" by Robert Koehler of Variety, who felt that the film was marred by its "choppy" direction, its sub-par production values, and its "confused" and "morally precarious" depiction of Homolka, which Koehler felt undermined her complicity in Bernardo's actions, writing, "There's a certain darkly suffocating quality to the chamber drama played out by these two sick souls, but the fact that the film is more willing to explicitly show Paul's constant beatings of Karla than the worst aspects of the killings underlines who is to be seen as the victim here." The Globe and Mail's Rick Groen was similarly critical of the film emphasizing Homolka's suffering over that of her and their victims, and further opined that the picture was both "inexcusably mundane" and lacking in substance before awarding it a final score of one-and-a-half out of a possible four. Ken Eisner of The Georgia Straight condemned the film, deriding it as nothing more than a dull, clichéd, and "slapdash portrait of serial killers" that was completely devoid of "depth, tension, or psychological insight."

While Louis B. Hobson (who called the film "disturbing" and "nauseating") of the Calgary Sun praised Misha Collins and Laura Prepon's acting and the restraint that Karla showed by not depicting or exaggerating "the worst excesses" of the crimes that it was dramatizing, he went on to write, "You don't recommend a movie such as Karla, even if you can appreciate the performances that make it unnerving." The Winnipeg Sun's Pat St. Germaine lauded the film's acting, but also felt that it was a failure as a psychoanalytical character study, and concluded his review of it with, "Those who choose to see Karla will exit the theatre with much food for thought, but it's hard to imagine anyone will be enriched by it." The film's inadequate exploration of Homolka's psyche was also a point of contention for Vue Weekly's Brian Gibson, who wrote, "There is little ambiguity or tension at the core of this basically hollow karaoke version of the Bernardo-Homolka murders. Joel Bender's movie never resorts to gore-porn or sleaze-sationalism, avoiding any shots of Kristen French and Leslie Mahaffy (given different names here) being beaten or raped, and the simulations of Bernardo's horrific films offer no flashes of nudity that would make us feel complicit with the sexual predator. But Karla seldom probes its title character's own complicity." Bruce Kirkland of the Toronto Sun expressed annoyance over Karla's "awkward" and "clumsy" narrative, gave mild praise to both its stars' performances and its restrained portrayal of its subject matter, and ended his review of the film with, "This film is not for the families of the victims, nor is it watchable by anyone with strong feelings about the case. For others less impassioned, however, it is a flawed yet largely accurate portrait of rapist-killer Bernardo and the psychotic woman who became his partner in crime."
