= Karla Homolka =

Canadian serial killer (born 1970)

- Born: Karla Leanne Homolka; May 4, 1970 (age 56); Mississauga, Ontario, Canada
- Other names: Karla Leanne Teale; Leanne Teale; Leanne Bordelais
- Education: Queen's University, BA in psychology
- Spouses: Paul Bernardo (m. 1991; div. 1994) Thierry Bordelais (m. 2005)
- Children: 3
- Relatives: Tammy Homolka (sister)
- Status: Unconditionally released on July 4, 2005
- Conviction: Manslaughter (2 counts)
- Penalty: 12 years imprisonment
- Accomplice: Paul Bernardo

Details
- Span of crimes: December 24, 1990 – April 19, 1992
- Country: Canada
- Killed: 3

Karla Leanne Homolka (born May 4, 1970), also known as Karla Leanne Teale, Leanne Teale and Leanne Bordelais, is a Canadian woman who acted as an accomplice to her husband, Paul Bernardo, taking active part in the rapes and murders of at least two girls and the rape leading to the death of her sister, Tammy Homolka, between 1990 and 1992.

Homolka attracted worldwide media attention when a plea bargain with Ontario prosecutors meant she was only convicted of manslaughter, and served twelve years for the torture, rapes and murders of the other victims, Leslie Mahaffy and Kristen French. Homolka testified against Bernardo, who was convicted of the Mahaffy–French murders and received life imprisonment and a dangerous offender designation.

Homolka's plea bargain came about after she told investigators that she had been Bernardo's unwilling accomplice as a result of domestic violence. However, videotapes of the crimes surfaced after the plea bargain and before Bernardo's trial which showed that Homolka had been a more active participant than she had originally claimed, including in the rape and death of her sister. As a result, the plea bargain that she had struck with prosecutors was dubbed in the Canadian media the "Deal with the Devil". Public outrage about the deal continued until Homolka's high-profile release from prison in 2005.

Following her release, Homolka settled in Quebec, where she married a brother of her lawyer. In 2007, she settled in the Antilles and Guadeloupe, but by 2014 had returned to Quebec.

== Early life ==
Karla Homolka was born on May 4, 1970, in Mississauga, Ontario. Her younger sister, Tammy Homolka, was born on January 1, 1975.

== Victims ==
=== Tammy Homolka ===
According to Homolka, her husband Paul Bernardo became attracted to her younger sister, Tammy Homolka, during the summer of 1990. This attraction was confirmed by Bernardo, during an interview conducted in 2007 while in custody, to have begun in July 1990. Karla hatched a plan to help Bernardo drug Tammy, seeing an opportunity to "minimise risks, take control, and keep it all in the family." In July, "according to Bernardo's testimony, he and Karla served Tammy a spaghetti dinner spiked with Valium stolen from Karla's workplace. Bernardo raped Tammy for about a minute before she started to wake up."

Homolka later stole the anesthetic agent halothane from the St. Catharines veterinarian clinic where she worked. On December 23, 1990, after a Christmas party at the Homolka household, Bernardo and Homolka drugged Tammy with the animal tranquilizer. The couple subsequently raped Tammy while she was unconscious. Tammy later choked on her own vomit and died. Before calling 9-1-1, Bernardo and Homolka hid the evidence, did the laundry, redressed Tammy, who had a chemical burn on her face, and moved her into her basement bedroom. A few hours later, Tammy was pronounced dead at St. Catharines General Hospital without having regained consciousness. Bernardo told police he had unsuccessfully tried to revive her, and her death was ruled an accident.

=== Jane Doe ===
On June 7, 1991, Homolka invited a 15-year-old girl she had befriended at a pet shop two years earlier, known as "Jane Doe" in the trials, to their home. "Doe" was then drugged by Homolka. Both Homolka and Bernardo sexually assaulted her and videotaped their assault. In August, "Jane Doe" was invited back to the couple's residence and was again drugged. Homolka dialled emergency services after the girl vomited and stopped breathing while being raped. The ambulance was recalled after Homolka and Bernardo resuscitated her.

=== Leslie Mahaffy ===
Early in the morning on June 15, 1991, Bernardo detoured through Burlington, halfway between Toronto and St. Catharines, to steal licence plates and found Leslie Mahaffy standing outside her home. The 14-year-old had missed her curfew after attending a friend's wake and was locked out of her house. Bernardo left his car and approached Mahaffy, saying that he wanted to break into a neighbour's house. Unfazed, she asked if he had any cigarettes. He claimed he had some in his vehicle. When Bernardo led her to his car he blindfolded her, forced her into the car, drove her to Port Dalhousie and informed Homolka that they had a victim.

Bernardo and Homolka videotaped themselves torturing and sexually abusing Mahaffy while they listened to Bob Marley and David Bowie. At one point Bernardo said, "You're doing a good job, Leslie, a damned good job", adding: "The next two hours are going to determine what I do to you. Right now, you're scoring perfect." On another segment of tape played at Bernardo's trial, the assault escalated. Mahaffy cried out in pain, and begged Bernardo to stop. In the Crown description of the scene, he was sodomizing her while her hands were bound with twine.

Mahaffy later told Bernardo that her blindfold seemed to be slipping, which signalled the possibility that she could identify her attackers if she was set free or lived. The following day, Bernardo claimed, Homolka gave her a lethal dose of triazolam. Homolka claimed that Bernardo strangled her. They put Mahaffy's body in their basement. The day after, the Homolka family had a Father's Day dinner at Bernardo's and Homolka's house.

After the Homolkas and their remaining daughter Lori left, Bernardo and Homolka decided that the best way to dispose of the evidence would be to dismember Mahaffy and encase each part of her remains in concrete. Bernardo bought a dozen bags of cement at a hardware store the following day. He kept the receipts, which were damaging at his trial. Bernardo used his grandfather's circular saw to dismember Mahaffy. Bernardo and Homolka made a number of trips to dump the cement blocks in Lake Gibson, 18 kilometres (11 mi) south of Port Dalhousie. At least one of the blocks weighed 90 kilograms (200 lb) and was beyond their ability to sink. It lay near the shore, where it was found by Michael Doucette and his son Michael Jr while on a fishing expedition on June 29, 1991. Mahaffy's orthodontic appliance was instrumental in identifying her.

Homolka was released from prison on July 4, 2005. Several days before, Bernardo was interviewed by police and his lawyer Tony Bryant. According to Bryant, Bernardo said that he had always intended to free the girls he and Homolka kidnapped. However, when Mahaffy's blindfold fell off, allowing her to see Bernardo's face, Homolka was concerned that Mahaffy would identify Bernardo and report them to the police. Bernardo claimed that Homolka planned to murder Mahaffy by injecting an air bubble into her bloodstream, triggering an air embolism.

=== Kristen French ===
During the after-school hours of April 16, 1992, Bernardo and Homolka drove through St. Catharines to look for potential victims. Although students were still going home, the streets were generally empty. As they passed Holy Cross Secondary School, a Catholic high school in the city's north end, they spotted 15-year-old Kristen French walking briskly to her home nearby. They pulled into the parking lot of nearby Grace Lutheran Church and Homolka got out of the car, map in hand, pretending to need assistance. When French looked at the map, Bernardo attacked from behind and brandished a knife, forcing her into the front seat of their car. From the back seat, Homolka subdued French by pulling her hair.

French took the same route home every day, taking about 15 minutes to get home and care for her dog. Soon after she should have arrived, her parents became convinced that she had met with foul play and notified police. Within 24 hours the Niagara Regional Police Service (NRP) assembled a team, searched French's route and found several witnesses who had seen the abduction from different locations, giving police some important details. French's shoe, recovered from the parking lot from where she had been taken, underscored the seriousness of the abduction.

Over the Easter weekend Bernardo and Homolka videotaped themselves torturing, raping and sodomizing French, forcing her to drink large amounts of alcohol and submit to Bernardo. At his trial, Crown prosecutor Ray Houlahan said that Bernardo always intended to kill her because she was never blindfolded and could identify her captors. The following day, Bernardo and Homolka murdered French before going to the Homolkas' for Easter dinner. Homolka testified at her trial that Bernardo strangled French for seven minutes while she watched. Bernardo said that Homolka beat French with a rubber mallet because she tried to escape, and French was strangled with a noose around her neck which was secured to a hope chest. Homolka then went to casually fix her own hair.

French's nude body was discovered on April 30, 1992, in a ditch in Burlington, about 45 minutes from St. Catharines and a short distance from the cemetery where Mahaffy is buried. She had been washed, and her hair was cut off. Although it was thought that French's hair was removed as a trophy, Homolka testified that it was cut to impede identification.

== Aftermath ==
=== Publication ban ===
Citing the need to protect Bernardo's right to a fair trial, a publication ban was imposed on Homolka's preliminary inquiry.

The Crown had applied for the ban imposed on July 5, 1993, by Francis Kovacs, a Justice of the Ontario Court, General Division. Homolka, through her lawyers, supported the ban, whereas Bernardo's lawyers argued that he would be prejudiced by the ban since Homolka previously had been portrayed as his victim. Four media outlets and one author also opposed the application. Some lawyers argued that rumours could be doing more damage to the future trial process than the publication of the actual evidence.

Public access to the Internet effectively nullified the court's order. As did proximity to the Canada–US border, since a publication ban by an Ontario Court cannot apply in New York, Michigan, or anywhere else outside of Ontario. American journalists cited the First Amendment in editorials and published details of Homolka's testimony, which were widely distributed by many Internet sources, primarily on the alt.fan.karla-homolka Usenet newsgroup.

Newspapers in Buffalo, Detroit, Washington, New York City and even Britain, together with border radio and television stations, reported details gleaned from sources at Homolka's trial. The syndicated series A Current Affair aired two programs on the crimes. Canadians bootlegged copies of The Buffalo Evening News across the border, prompting orders to the Niagara Regional Police Service to arrest all those with more than one copy at the border. Extra copies were confiscated. Copies of other newspapers, including The New York Times, were either turned back at the border or were not accepted by distributors in Ontario. Gordon Domm, a retired police officer who defied the publication ban by distributing details from the foreign media, was charged and convicted of disobeying a lawful court order.

=== Plea bargain controversy ===
Jamie Cameron, professor of law at Osgoode Hall, noted that "at the time of the Homolka trial, three features of the case worried and concerned the public. Little was known about the respective roles Homolka and Bernardo played in their actions and the killing of their victims. By spring, 1993, it was clear that the Crown's case against Bernardo depended on Homolka's evidence. In simple terms, to secure a conviction against him, her story had to be believed. Yet on no view of the facts then known could she be exculpated; by casting her as a victim of his predatory behaviour, her responsibility for the crimes that were committed could be diminished and her credibility as a witness preserved."

== Trial ==
=== Plea bargain ===
After lengthy negotiations between prosecutors and Homolka's lawyer, a plea bargain was struck on May 14, 1993, according to which Homolka would testify against Bernardo and would plead guilty to two counts of manslaughter, in exchange for a sentence of 12 years in prison.

=== Arraignment ===
On May 18, 1993, Homolka was arraigned on two counts of manslaughter. Bernardo was charged with two counts each of kidnapping, unlawful confinement, aggravated sexual assault and first-degree murder as well as one of dismemberment. That day Bernardo's original lawyer, Ken Murray, first watched the rape videotapes. Murray decided to hold onto the tapes and use them to impeach Homolka on the stand during Bernardo's trial. Neither Murray nor Carolyn MacDonald, the other lawyer on the defence team, were deeply experienced in criminal law and it was only over time that their ethical dilemma showed itself also to be a potentially criminal matter, for they were withholding evidence. By October 1993, he and his law partners had studied over 4,000 documents from the Crown. Murray has said he was willing to hand over the tapes to the Crown if they had let him cross-examine Homolka in the anticipated preliminary hearing. The hearing was never held.

=== Hearing and sentencing ===
Homolka was tried between June 28 and July 6, 1993. The publication ban the court had imposed limited the details released to the public, who were barred from the proceedings. She pled guilty and was sentenced to 12 years imprisonment on July 6, 1993.

=== Evidence ===
Murray said the videotapes showed Homolka sexually assaulting four female victims, having sex with a female sex worker in Atlantic City, and at another point, drugging an unconscious victim. In February 1994, Homolka divorced Bernardo.

During the summer of 1994, Murray had become concerned about serious ethical problems that had arisen in connection with the tapes and his continued representation of Bernardo. He consulted his own lawyer, Austin Cooper, who asked the Law Society of Upper Canada's professional-conduct committee for advice.

"The law society directed Murray in writing to seal the tapes in a package and turn them over to the judge presiding at Bernardo's trial. The law society further directed him to remove himself as Bernardo's counsel and to tell Bernardo what he had been instructed to do", Murray said in a statement released through Cooper in September 1995.

On September 12, 1994, Cooper attended Bernardo's trial and advised Justice Patrick LeSage of the Ontario Court's General Division, lawyer John Rosen, who replaced Murray as Bernardo's defence counsel, and the prosecutors about what the law society had directed Murray to do. Rosen argued that the tapes should have been turned over to the defence first. Murray handed the tapes, along with a detailed summary, to Rosen, who "kept the tapes for about two weeks and then decided to turn them over to the prosecution."

The revelation that a key piece of evidence had been kept from police for so long created a furor, especially when the public realized that Homolka had been Bernardo's willing accomplice. The tapes were not allowed to be shown to the spectators. Only the audio portion was available to them. Bernardo has always claimed that, while he raped and tortured Leslie Mahaffy and Kristen French, Homolka actually killed them.

After the videotapes had been found, rumours spread that Homolka was an active participant of the crimes. The public grew incensed as the full extent of Homolka's role in the case was finally exposed and the plea agreement now seemed unnecessary. However, as was provided in the plea bargain, Homolka had already disclosed sufficient information to the police, and the Crown found no grounds to break the agreement and reopen the case.

== Appeal and inquest ==
Homolka's plea bargain had been offered before the contents of the videotapes were available for review. Anne McGillivray, associate professor of law at the University of Manitoba, explained the continuing public antagonism against Homolka: There was widespread belief that she had known where the videotapes were hidden, that she wilfully concealed the Jane Doe incidents and, most centrally, that her claims of being under Bernardo's control – a central tenet of the plea bargain – were dubious. Speculation was fed by a publicity ban on the plea bargain which stood until Bernardo's trial.

"Print and website sources imagined demonic duos, vampirism, Barbie and Ken perfect-couple perfect murderers [sic], sexy 'Killer Karla', the comic 'Karla's Web' featuring Homolka's psy [sic] confessions. The gaze centres, always, on Homolka (italics added).... That [Bernardo] would be incarcerated for his mortal lifespan seemed a foregone conclusion. Homolka, in the popular view, should have taken her seat beside him in the prisoner's box and seat of ultimate evil.... Homolka promised full disclosure and testimony against Bernardo in return for reduced charges... and a joint sentencing recommendation. In so doing, she escaped central blame for the deaths."

Although the contents of the videotapes would likely have led to a conviction of murder for Homolka, an inquiry into the conduct of the prosecutors who had made the plea bargain found their behaviour "professional and responsible" and the "resolution agreement" that they had established with Homolka "unassailable" under the Criminal Code. Judge Patrick T. Galligan, reporting to the Attorney General on the matter, indicated that in his opinion "the Crown had no alternative but to ...[negotiate with the accomplice] in this case" as "the 'lesser of two evils' to deal with an accomplice rather than to be left in a situation where a violent and dangerous offender cannot be prosecuted."

In December 2001, Canadian authorities determined that there was no possible future use of the videotapes. The six videotapes depicting the torture and rape of Bernardo's and Homolka's victims were destroyed. The disposition of the tapes of Homolka watching and commenting on the tapes remains sealed.

== Prison ==
After her 1995 testimony against Bernardo, when Homolka returned to Kingston's Prison For Women, her mother, Dorothy Homolka, started to suffer annual breakdowns between Thanksgiving and Christmas. The collapses were severe enough that she was hospitalized, sometimes for months at a time. While at Kingston, Homolka began correspondence courses in sociology through nearby Queen's University which initially caused a media storm. Homolka was required to pay all fees, as well as her personal needs, from her fortnightly income of about C$69, although, she told author Stephen Williams in a subsequent letter, "I did get some financial assistance". Homolka later graduated with a bachelor's degree in psychology from Queen's.

Homolka was moved from Kingston in the summer of 1997 to Joliette Institution, a medium security prison in Joliette, Quebec, 80 km northeast of Montreal.

In 1999, Toronto Star reporter Michelle Shephard came into possession of copies of her application to transfer to the Maison Thérèse-Casgrain, run by the Elizabeth Fry Society, and published the story noting the halfway house's proximity to local schools, hours before the Canadian courts issued a publication ban on the information. Homolka sued the government after her transfer to a Montreal halfway house was denied.

In 2001, Homolka was transferred to the Ste-Anne-des-Plaines Institution, a maximum security prison in Quebec.

During Homolka's release hearing (under section 810.2 of the Criminal Code), Louis Morrisette, psychiatrist, said the then-35-year-old did not represent a threat to society. Various hearings over the years have left a mixture of opinions. If she posed any kind of danger, said Dr. Hubert Van Gijseghem, a forensic psychologist for Correctional Services Canada, it lay in the ominous but not unlikely possibility of her linking up with another sexual sadist like Bernardo. "She is very attracted to this world of sexual psychopaths. It's not for nothing that she did what she did with Bernardo," he told the National Post after reviewing her file. A scheduled newspaper interview with Homolka was quashed by her lawyer.

Where other inmates might apply for parole at the first opportunity, Homolka refrained from doing so. "Because she was deemed a risk to reoffend, she was denied statutory release two-thirds of the way through her sentence," Maclean's reported in explaining what had exempted Homolka from the parole restrictions meant to ease an offender's integration into mainstream society. In 2004, the Canadian Broadcasting Corporation noted that "The National Parole Board has ruled that Karla Homolka must stay in prison for her full sentence, warning that she remains a risk to commit another violent crime."

While the NPB noted that she had made some progress toward rehabilitation, it expressed concern regarding her relationship with convicted murderer Jean-Paul Gerbet. The NPB reprimanded Homolka: "you have secretly undertaken an emotional relationship with another inmate, and evidence gathered seems to indicate that this relationship rapidly became sexual," the panel stated. As a result, it decided to keep her in prison.

== Release ==
A rumour that Homolka intended to settle in Alberta caused an uproar in that province. Maclean's weighed in with a series of possible scenarios: "The most educated speculation has Homolka staying in Quebec, where language and cultural differences supposedly muted the media coverage of her case, and where she'll be less recognizable. Another rumour suggests she might flee overseas, restarting in a country where her case is unknown. Or sneak into the United States, using an illegal identity to cross the border and living out her life under a pseudonym."

Michael Bryant, Ontario's Attorney General fought to get Homolka on the agenda at a meeting of Canada's justice ministers. "Bilingual and armed with a bachelor's degree in psychology from Queen's University, Homolka may choose to try to live a quiet life in Quebec, where her crimes are not as well known as they are in English-speaking Canada," reported CTV in May 2005.

On June 2, 2005, the network said, "the Ontario Crown will ask a Quebec judge to impose conditions under Section 810 of Criminal Code on Homolka's release." "The French and Mahaffy families want even tighter restrictions on Homolka, including asking that she submit to electronic monitoring or yearly psychological and psychiatric assessment," CTV said. These conditions are not allowed under Section 810 because they cross the line between preventive justice versus punitive measures, but "that's why [Toronto lawyer Tim Danson, acting on their behalf] believes the families want the government to amend the Section."

A two-day hearing was held before Judge Jean R. Beaulieu in June 2005. He ruled that Homolka, upon her release on July 4, 2005, would still pose a risk to the public-at-large. As a result, using section 810.2 of the Criminal Code, certain restrictions were placed on Homolka as a condition of her release:

1. She was to tell police her home address, work address and with whom she lives
2. She was required to notify police as soon as any of the above changed
3. She was likewise required to notify police of any change to her name
4. If she planned to be away from her home for more than 48 hours, she had to give 72 hours' notice
5. She could not contact Paul Bernardo, the families of Leslie Mahaffy and Kristen French or that of the woman known as Jane Doe (see above), or any violent criminals
6. She was forbidden to be with people under the age of 16
7. She was forbidden to consume drugs other than prescription medicine
8. She was required to continue therapy and counselling
9. She was required to provide police with a DNA sample

There was a penalty of a maximum two-year prison term for violating such an order. While this reassured the public that Homolka would find it difficult to offend again, it was felt by the court that it might be detrimental to her as well, because public hostility and her high profile might endanger her upon release.

On June 10, 2005, Senator Michel Biron declared that the conditions placed on Homolka were "totalitarian", according to an interview with CTV Newsnet. Two weeks later, Biron apologized.

On July 4, 2005, Homolka was released from Ste-Anne-des-Plaines prison. She granted her first interview to Radio-Canada television, speaking entirely in French. Homolka told interviewer Joyce Napier that she chose Radio Canada because she had found it to be less sensationalist than the English-language media. She said that she had likewise found Quebec to be more accepting of her than Ontario. She affirmed that she would be living within the province but refused to say where. She said she had paid her debt to society legally, but not emotionally or socially. She refused to speak about her alleged relationship with Jean-Paul Gerbet, a convicted murderer serving a life sentence at Ste-Anne-des-Plaines. During the interview, her solicitor, Sylvie Bordelais, sat beside Homolka; however, she did not speak. Homolka's mother was also present but off-screen, and was acknowledged by Homolka.

== Psychiatric evaluation ==
Before her imprisonment, Homolka had been evaluated by numerous psychiatrists, psychologists, and other mental health and court officials. Homolka, reported one, "remains something of a diagnostic mystery. Despite her ability to present herself very well, there is a moral vacuity in her which is difficult, if not impossible, to explain."

Graham Glancy, a forensic psychiatrist hired by Bernardo's chief defence lawyer, John Rosen, had offered an alternative theory to explain Homolka's behaviour, noted Williams in Invisible Darkness, his first book on the case. "She appears to be a classic example of hybristophilia, an individual who is sexually aroused by a partner's violent sexual behaviour," Glancy suggested.

Williams later reversed his opinion about her and began corresponding with her. This formed the basis for his second book, Karla: A Pact with the Devil. In her letters Homolka also disparaged a number of the professionals who had examined her and said she did not care "what conditions I would receive upon release. I would spend three hours a day standing on my head should that be required."

== Freedom and relocation to Guadeloupe; subsequent return to Canada ==
The national media reported in July 2005 that Homolka had relocated to the Island of Montreal. On August 21, 2005, Le Courrier du Sud reported that she had been sighted in the South Shore community of Longueuil, across the St. Lawrence River from Montreal.

On November 30, 2005, Quebec Superior Court Judge James Brunton lifted all restrictions imposed on Homolka, saying there was not enough evidence to justify them. On December 6, 2005, the Quebec Court of Appeal upheld Brunton's decision. The Quebec Justice Department decided not to take the case to the Supreme Court, despite Ontario's urging.

TVA reported on June 8, 2006, that Homolka's request to have her name changed was rejected. She had attempted to change her name legally to Emily Chiara Tremblay (Tremblay being one of the most common surnames in Quebec).

Sun Media reported in 2007 that Homolka had given birth to a baby boy. Quebec Children's Aid said that despite Homolka's past, the new mother would not automatically be scrutinized. Several nurses had refused to care for Homolka before she gave birth. On December 14, 2007, CityNews reported that Homolka had left Canada for the Antilles so that her then one-year-old could lead a "more normal life."

On October 17, 2014, the jury in the first degree murder trial of Luka Magnotta heard that Homolka was living in Quebec; Magnotta had previously secretly disseminated false rumours of him dating Homolka which he would subsequently deny in interviews.

An online poll of 9,521 voters conducted in July, 2012 concluded that 63.27% believed that the public had the right to know Homolka's location, 18.57% of voters believed that she deserved anonymity, and 18.16% believed that Homolka should be permitted to receive anonymity in about 50 years.

News reports as of April 20, 2016, placed Homolka as living with her children in Châteauguay, Quebec. Homolka was reportedly angry with reporters' attempts to speak with her. Parents of children attending the same school as Homolka's children expressed great concern, despite reassurances from the school and the school board. As of January 2020, she lives in Salaberry-de-Valleyfield without her husband or children.

== Possibility of pardon ==
On April 19, 2010, The Vancouver Sun reported that Homolka would be eligible to seek pardon for her crimes in the summer of 2010. Offenders convicted of first- or second-degree murder or with indeterminate sentences cannot apply for a pardon as their sentences are for life, but Homolka was convicted of manslaughter, and received less than the maximum life sentence, making her eligible. If she had been successful, her criminal record would not have been erased; however, it would have been covered up in background checks, except those required for working with children or other vulnerable people. Partially in response to Homolka's case, a bill to limit access to pardons for serious crimes was fast-tracked through the House of Commons and Senate in June 2010, taking only 12 days from first reading in the House of Commons to Royal assent.

== In popular culture ==
=== Literature ===
- In 1997, Lynn Crosbie, Canadian poet, novelist and cultural critic, published Paul's Case, termed a "theoretical fiction". After analyzing the couple's crimes, it provided an examination of the cultural effects of the shocking revelations and controversy surrounding their trial.
- Lynda Véronneau together with writer Christiane Desjardins, wrote Lynda Véronneau : dans l'ombre de Karla, on the topic of her relationship with Homolka while in prison, published in 2005 by Les Éditions Voix Parallèles.

=== Television and film ===
- A 1998 episode of Homicide: Life On The Street (Season 6 Episode 19, "Strangled Not Stirred"), a 2000 episode of Law & Order (Season 10 Episode 15, "Fools for Love"), and a 2006 episode of Criminal Minds (Season 2 Episode 3, "The Perfect Storm") were inspired by this case. Additionally, in a 2014 episode of the latter show (Season 9 Episode 15, "Mr. & Mrs. Anderson"), Dr. Spencer Reid references the real-life case.
- The two-part finale of the first season of Da Vinci's Inquest follows the investigation of a married serial killer couple whose modus operandi resembles that of Homolka and Bernardo.
- The MSNBC documentary series Dark Heart, Iron Hand devoted an episode to the case, which was later rebroadcast as an episode of the series MSNBC Investigates, retitled "To Love and To Kill".
- In 2006, Quantum Entertainment released the film Karla (which had the working title Deadly), starring Laura Prepon as Homolka and Misha Collins as Bernardo. Tim Danson, lawyer for the French and Mahaffy families, was given a private screening, and announced that the families had no objection to the film's release. Nevertheless, Ontario Premier Dalton McGuinty called for a boycott. The film was given a limited release in Canada by Christal Films.
- Her case is featured on the Season 2, Episode 8 titled "Killer Dolls" from the show Deadly Sins.
- An episode of Murder Made Me Famous on the Reelz Television Network, airing December 8, 2018, chronicled the case.
- Another documentary aired on the Discovery+ streaming service via the sub-channel Investigation Discovery entitled The Ken & Barbie Killers: The Lost Tapes. It premiered on December 12, 2021, and consisted of 4 episodes.
- The 2019 Netflix documentary miniseries Don't F**k with Cats: Hunting an Internet Killer featured a segment on Karla Homolka, who had been a fixation of Canadian murderer Luka Magnotta. Magnotta claimed that unnamed parties were trying to implicate him as being in a relationship with Homolka. The documentary dubbed Homolka "the most hated woman in Canada."

== See also ==
- List of serial killers by country
