= Pierre LeBrun =

Canadian sportscaster and writer

Pierre LeBrun is a Canadian sportscaster and writer. Working for The Sports Network, he appears as a "Hockey Insider", and regularly appears on hockey-related broadcasts. He is also a senior National Hockey League (NHL) columnist for The Athletic, and has appeared as a regular panelist on Hockey Night in Canada.

== Career ==
After becoming a mainstay on TSN's weekly "Insider Trading" segment in 2011, LeBrun has appeared on various TSN programming, including SportsCentre, That's Hockey and TSN Radio stations across the country. As a TSN "Hockey Insider", he delivers breaking news and in-depth analysis and commentary across the TSN's hockey programming, and on Réseau des sports in Montreal.

LeBrun previously worked nine years for ESPN as a hockey columnist for ESPN.com. Prior to joining ESPN in 2008, LeBrun spent 13 years as a national hockey reporter for the Canadian Press.

Since 2017, LeBrun has also served as a senior NHL columnist with The Athletic. He also collaborated on a recurring ice hockey podcast with Scott Burnside, titled "Two-Man Advantage", discussing the NHL.

LeBrun graduated from the Carleton University school of journalism in 1995.

== Awards ==
In 2005, LeBrun's coverage of the 2004-05 NHL lockout earned him the Outstanding Sports Writing Award from Sport Canada.
