= Murder of Leslie Mahaffy =

1991 murder in Ontario, Canada

Leslie Mahaffy
- Born: Leslie Erin Mahaffy; July 5, 1976; Hamilton, Ontario, Canada
- Died: June 16, 1991 (aged 14); Burlington, Ontario, Canada
- Occupation: Grade 9 student

Leslie Erin Mahaffy (July 5, 1976 – June 16, 1991) was a 14-year-old Canadian girl and the second murder victim of Paul Bernardo and Karla Homolka after the two sociopaths had raped and murdered Homolka's child sister six months prior. At the time of her death, she was a resident of Burlington, Ontario, and a Grade 9 student at M.M. Robinson High School. She was born in Hamilton, Ontario.

Bernardo was convicted of two first-degree murders and two aggravated sexual assaults, and sentenced to life in prison. Homolka was convicted of manslaughter and sentenced to 12 years imprisonment. Mahaffy's kidnapping was one in a series of disappearances of Ontario schoolgirls in the early 1990s which also included Kristen French, who was kidnapped and murdered by Bernardo and Homolka ten months after Mahaffy's murder. Six months before Mahaffy's murder, Homolka's teenage sister Tammy had aspirated her own vomit after having been drugged and raped by the couple. The disappearances, arrests, and convictions were widely covered in the media, becoming one of the most notorious criminal cases in Canadian history.

== Family ==
Leslie Erin Mahaffy was born on July 5, 1976. Her brother Ryan was born some years later. Her father was an oceanographer for the Canadian federal Fisheries and Oceans department and sometimes would be on assignments away from home for weeks at a time. Her mother was a teacher.

As she grew older, Mahaffy began to spend periods of time away from the family home but always phoned home during her absences and kept in touch with her younger brother Ryan, with whom she was very close. Shortly before her abduction, some friends had been killed in a car accident. The evening prior to her abduction, Leslie attended a memorial for one of the teens as well as an informal get-together and subsequently missed her Friday night curfew. Finding the door locked, Leslie traveled to a nearby plaza to use the pay telephone to ask a friend if she might spend the night at the friend's home but was refused.

Returning home, she crossed paths with Bernardo who had been out looking into backyards, hoping to find a victim. Bernardo lured Leslie back to his nearby car and took her to the house he shared with Homolka. Later that day, Leslie's friend telephoned the Mahaffy house to inquire about Leslie's well-being and explained the call that Leslie had made after discovering that she had been locked out, prompting Leslie's mother to start searching for Leslie. Finding no trace of her daughter, she eventually became concerned and contacted the police. When Mahaffy failed to phone home on her own birthday about two weeks later, her family was certain that she had not called them because she could not.

Her mother Debbie would later become prominent in the struggle to maintain and enforce the judge's gag order about the trials of Mahaffy's killers and the videotapes they made of their own crimes, which were used as evidence against them.

Mahaffy's remains are interred under a family headstone at Burlington Memorial Gardens in Burlington, Ontario, Canada. There is also a heart-shaped garden with a plaque in Leslie's honor at M.M.Robinson High School and a memorial bench close to her family headstone.

== Kidnapping ==
At the time of her abduction and subsequent murder in mid-June 1991, a few weeks before her fifteenth birthday, Leslie Mahaffy was a Grade 9 student at M.M.Robinson High School in Burlington.

On the evening of June 14, 1991, Mahaffy went to a funeral home to attend a wake for her friend Chris Evans, a boy who had died in a car accident earlier that week.

After the wake, a large group of teens met in the woods to drink and console one another. As the evening wound down, a couple of friends walked her home shortly before 2:00 am, where they stayed with her while she found the side door locked. She told them the front door would surely be unlocked, and sent them home. After they left her, she found the front door was locked as well.

Now alone, Mahaffy walked to a pay phone at Mac's Milk and called a friend's house for permission to sleep over. Her friend told her no, and after a lengthy conversation that ended after 2:30 am, Mahaffy said she would go back home and wake up her own mother to get in the house.

When Mahaffy failed to appear later that day at the funerals for her friend Chris Evans and the three teens killed with him, her mother phoned the police. On June 18, Debbie Mahaffy filed the official paperwork to have her daughter sought and arrested as a runaway.

Paul Bernardo eventually admitted he had been on Keller Court, where the Mahaffy home was located, to steal license plates. He saw Leslie Mahaffy alone. He claims he told her he was breaking into the house next door and then offered her a cigarette, which he said was back at his car. When she was close enough to the car, he said he wrapped his sweatshirt quickly around her head, forced her into the vehicle, and took her to the home he shared with Homolka. Homolka's version of the story is similar, but she claims that once he got Mahaffy to the car to fetch the cigarette, he pulled a knife on the girl to get her compliance. Both agree that Homolka was not present during the kidnapping.

== Murder ==
The next 24 hours were spent with Bernardo and Homolka raping and abusing Mahaffy. During one attack, Mahaffy pleaded for help from Homolka while she filmed the attack on video camera. Both killers agree that they gave her a teddy bear to hold during breaks between assaults.

Mahaffy informed Bernardo that she believed her blindfold was slipping. This worried he and Homolka, as it mean their victim could potentially identify them if freed. Both Homolka and Bernardo agree that this was the reason they decided to murder her, but disagree on who committed the act. Homolka claimed Bernardo strangled Mahaffy, while Bernardo claimed Homolka gave her a lethal dose of triazolam. Regardless, Mahaffy died on June 16, 1991.

On the same day, Bernardo and Homolka moved Mahaffy's body from an upstairs bedroom to the basement. During this time, Bernardo and Homolka hosted Homolka's family for a Father's Day dinner on the main floor of the house, with Homolka making a special effort to keep her mother from going downstairs. When the family left, Bernardo and Homolka used his grandfather's circular saw to dismember Mahaffy's body into pieces small enough to lift when covered with concrete. Later, in a confession to her aunt before revealing details to the police, Homolka claimed that Bernardo did this while she was at work on Monday. Bernardo's version asserts that she did not help him rinse and bag the body parts.

Mahaffy's body was found dismembered and encased in concrete on June 29, 1991, in Lake Gibson near St. Catharines, Ontario. The concrete block containing the torso weighed over 200 pounds. Her braces and dental records confirmed her identity.

Investigators immediately believed she had been raped and tortured. This was confirmed when videotapes were discovered in the home of Bernardo and Homolka. The tapes show that she was held hostage for approximately 24 hours and repeatedly assaulted and sodomized. After Bernardo's final bid for an appeal before the Supreme Court was rejected, the tapes were all destroyed by the Ontario government.

=== Bernardo's 2005 statements ===
Several days before Homolka's release from prison in 2005, Bernardo was interviewed by police and his lawyer, Tony Bryant. Bryant was subsequently interviewed by the media, providing Bernardo's thoughts about the release.

According to Bryant, Bernardo claimed that he had always intended to free the girls he and Homolka had held captive. Bernardo claimed that Homolka was worried that Leslie Mahaffy's blindfold had fallen off and that she would be able to identify them. Further, Bernardo claimed that Homolka's plan was to murder Mahaffy by injecting an air bubble into her bloodstream, eventually causing an embolism.

== See also ==
- List of solved missing person cases: 1950–1999

== In popular culture ==
=== Television and film ===
- Dark Heart, Iron Hand. A documentary broadcast by MSNBC. Rebroadcast as an episode of the series MSNBC Investigates retitled "To Love and To Kill" May 31, 2002, and September 4, 2007.
- Karla starring Laura Prepon and Misha Collins. Monterey Video (2007) No ISBN available. ASIN B000MNOXX0.
- The premiere episode of Wicked Attraction, a television show which focuses on couples who commit heinous crimes, focuses on Paul Bernardo and Karla Homolka. The episode, entitled "The Perfect Couple" first aired on August 7, 2008.

=== Podcasts ===
- In 2017, Karen Kilgariff covered the case on the podcast My Favorite Murder in Episode 91, titled Live at the Sony Centre in Toronto.
- Criminal AF: Episode 2 The Ken and Barbie Killers: Paul Bernardo and Karla Homolka
