= Death of Tammy Homolka =

1990 homicide in Ontario, Canada

Tammy Homolka
- Born: Tammy Lyn Homolka; January 1, 1975; Mississauga, Ontario, Canada
- Died: December 24, 1990 (aged 15); St. Catharines, Ontario, Canada
- Occupation: Grade 10 student
- Parents: Karel Homolka (father); Dorothy Homolka (mother)
- Relatives: Karla Homolka (sister)

Tammy Lyn Homolka (January 1, 1975 – December 24, 1990) was a 15-year-old Canadian girl who died after being drugged and raped by Paul Bernardo and her older sister, Karla Homolka. Her official cause of death was listed as choking to death on her own vomit and was initially ruled an accident.

After Karla revealed to her aunt and uncle that Bernardo was the Scarborough Rapist, as well as her involvement in the murders of Leslie Mahaffy and Kristen French, the Niagara Regional Police Service reopened its investigation into Tammy's death and the couple were subsequently arrested. Bernardo was convicted of two first-degree murders and two aggravated sexual assaults, and sentenced to life in prison without parole, while Karla was convicted of manslaughter and sentenced to 12 years imprisonment. The disappearances, arrests, and convictions were widely covered in the media, becoming one of the most notorious crimes in Canadian history.

== Biography ==
Tammy Homolka grew up in the neighbourhood of Port Credit to a Czech father and a Canadian mother. She was known for her athletic abilities and she avidly participated in a variety of sports, including track and field, cross country running, and soccer, with soccer being her favourite. She was a grade 10 student at Sir Winston Churchill Secondary School in St. Catharines at the time of her death.

== Bernardo's involvement ==
From the beginning of their relationship, Karla noticed that Bernardo had taken a particular liking to Tammy. He would often pay special attention to her, and even went so far as to have his girlfriend pretend to be her sister during sex. In September 1990, Karla agreed to allow Paul to rape Tammy. She obtained a bottle of Halothane from the veterinary clinic where she worked, which would later be used to sedate Tammy while the two raped her.

On December 24, 1990, Tammy was drugged with a combination of Halcion and alcohol, passing out in the family room in the basement of the Homolka house. Tammy's parents and sister Lori were sleeping upstairs at the time. They filmed the entire rape, taking turns holding the camera as they pressed a halothane-soaked cloth to Tammy's nose and mouth to keep her unconscious. While sedated, Tammy began to vomit and the couple unsuccessfully tried to revive her. After they covered up evidence of the assault, they dressed Tammy, moved her into her bedroom, and called an ambulance. Tammy never regained consciousness, and was pronounced dead at St. Catharines General Hospital a few hours later.

Three weeks after Tammy's death, Karla and Bernardo filmed a video called "The Fireside Chat" within the Homolka residence. The video was eventually shown to the court as evidence during their trial. It started in the basement and at some point the filming moved into Tammy's bedroom. While they were in the basement, Karla admitted to Bernardo that she enjoyed his rape of Tammy. She also said in the video that she would like to leave a rose at Tammy's grave site. When the couple were in Tammy's bedroom, Karla dressed up in her sister's clothing as well as acting like her, and she and Bernardo had sex on Tammy's bed.

In 2001, the magazine Elm Street published an article in which it implied that forensic evidence proved that Tammy's death was not an accident and that her sister had deliberately administered an overdose of halothane. The magazine described Karla as a "malignant narcissist" who was so incensed by her fiancé's attraction to her sister that she took steps to remove Tammy from his affections permanently.

== Implications of Karla Homolka's plea bargain ==
On February 26, 1993, the defense lawyer and the Crown began negotiations on a 10-year sentence for Karla in exchange for her testimony and full disclosure of all crimes. At the time of negotiations, the role she and Bernardo had played in Tammy's death was not known. When she was admitted for psychiatric assessment in March 1993, Karla confessed in a letter to her parents about her involvement in Tammy's death. When the plea agreement was finalized, the initial 10-year sentence was still intact, with two years added for Tammy's death. Karla was officially sentenced to 12 years on July 6, 1993.

On July 20, 1993, Tammy's body was exhumed. Inside her casket was a wedding invitation for Karla and Bernardo's wedding, as well as some notes. Other members of the Homolka family asked that the items be removed before Tammy's reinterment. She is interred at Victoria Lawn Cemetery in St. Catharines, Ontario.

== In popular culture ==
=== Literature ===
The book Deadly Innocence, published in September 1995 by Warner Books, was based on facts from the trial and outside sources. The book contained few details of the assaults, but concentrated on what was not heard at the trial, based on interviews of friends of Bernardo and Homolka.

- Invisible Darkness by Stephen Williams focuses primarily on Karla's involvement in the crimes she committed with Bernardo.
- Burnside, Scott; Cairns, Alan (1995). Deadly innocence. New York: Warner Books. ISBN 0-446-60154-3.

=== Television and film ===
In 2006, the American film Karla premiered. It was told from Karla Homolka's point of view. In the film, Tammy Homolka's death is featured in one of the scenes. Laura Prepon portrayed Karla, Misha Collins portrayed Paul Bernardo, and Cherilyn Hayres portrayed Tammy Homolka.
