= John Rosen =

Canadian criminal defence lawyer

John Rosen is a Canadian criminal defence lawyer, who has defended murder trials in Ontario, and perhaps the most in Canadian history. He has defended some notorious criminals in Canadian history, including Paul Bernardo, Pat and Angelo Musitano, Min Chen, Paul Volpe, Johnny Papalia, Carmen Barillaro and Pietro Scarcella. He is a partner in the Toronto law firm of Rosen Naster LLP.

== Early life ==
John Rosen's grandparents immigrated to Toronto from Poland in the early 1900s. He is the eldest of six children, whom his father supported with his Bay Street dry-cleaning shop, Imperial Cleaners, across from the Toronto Coach Terminal. At age 16, Rosen began driving the dry-cleaning delivery truck after school.

== Professional career ==
Rosen received his LL.B. from Osgoode Hall Law School in 1968. He was called to the Bar of Ontario in 1970. He is a member of a number of professional associations, including the Advocates Society, the Criminal Lawyers' Association, the National Association of Criminal Defense Lawyers in the US, and Canadian and American Bar Associations.

Rosen is well known for the notoriety of the accused criminals he defends. He is also known for the ruthlessness of his defence of persons accused of odious crimes. In one case, he was criticized for making a murder victim seem like a criminal.

Rosen successfully defended a man charged with second degree murder, where the prosecution withdrew the charge on the eve of trial following Rosen's appearance in the Supreme Court of Canada in the related case of Benson v. Brown, which set the ground rules for allowing access to lawyer/client confidential information regarding another suspect previously cleared by the police.

== High-Profile Cases ==
Among Rosen's high-profile cases were:

- Paul Bernardo, infamous Canadian serial killer and rapist.
- Defence of Pietro Scarcella, charged in the 2004 shooting of a Vaughan sandwich shop that left Louise Russo paralyzed.
- Min Chen, a Chinese visa student at the time, was found guilt of the kidnapping and murder of nine year-old Cecilia Zhang.
- Defence of Chuang Li, an ex-employee charged with stabbing 4 former co-workers.

== See also ==
- Crime in Toronto
- Crime in Canada
