= Jeffrey Finley =

Canadian football player (born 1991)

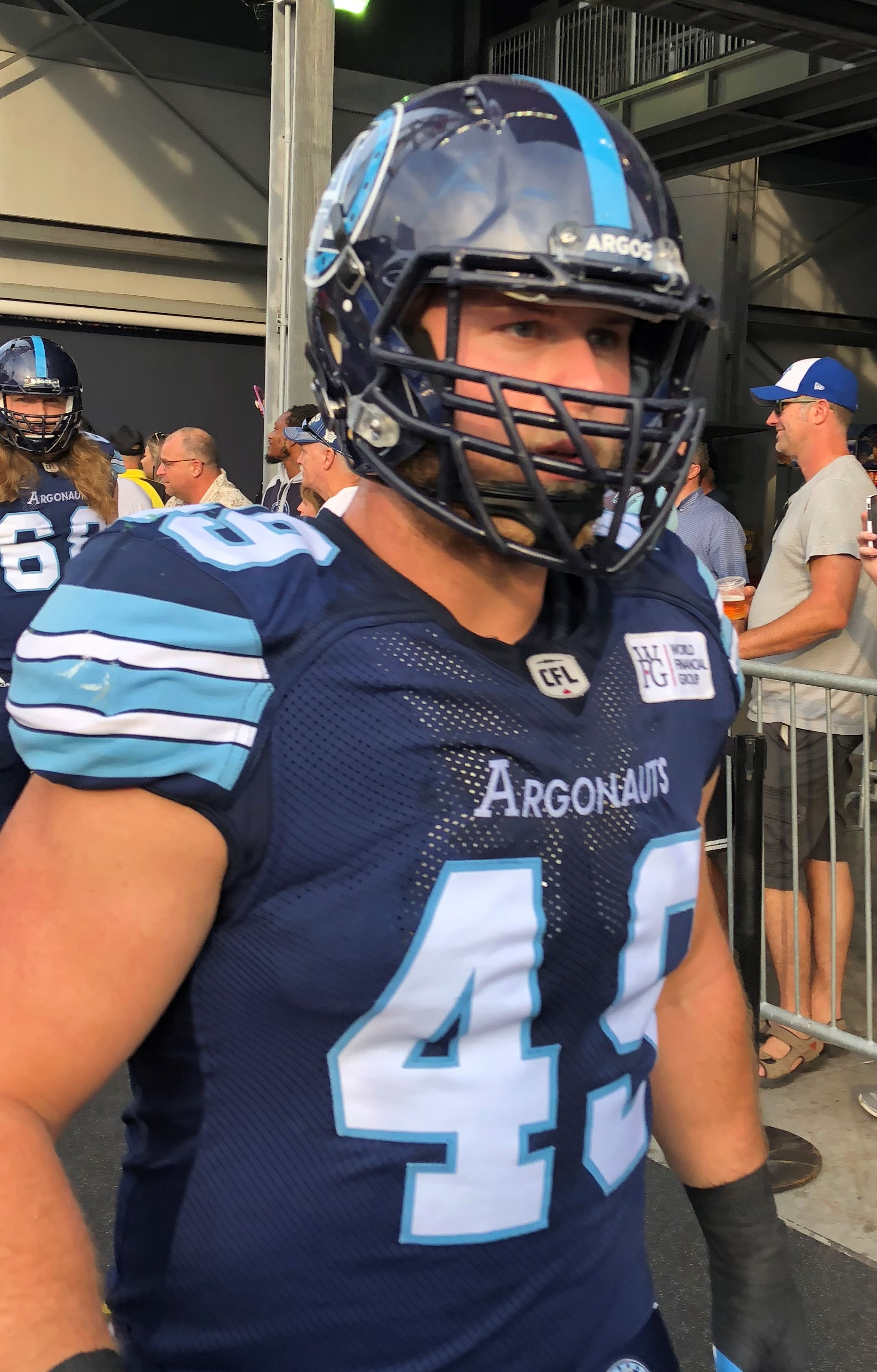
- Finley with the Toronto Argonauts in 2018

No. 49
- Position: Defensive lineman

Personal information
- Born: November 19, 1991 (age 34); St. Catharines, Ontario, Canada
- Listed height: 6 ft 3 in (1.91 m)
- Listed weight: 260 lb (118 kg)

Career information
- High school: Churchill (St. Catharines)
- University: Guelph
- CFL draft: 2014: 3rd round, 22nd overall pick

Career history
- 2014–2016: Montreal Alouettes
- 2017–2018: Toronto Argonauts
- Stats at CFL.ca

Jeffrey Finley (born November 19, 1991) is a Canadian former professional football defensive lineman who played in the Canadian Football League (CFL). He was drafted by the Montreal Alouettes in the third round of the 2014 CFL draft. He played CIS football at Guelph University and attended Sir Winston Churchill Secondary School in St. Catharines, Ontario.

== University career ==
Finley played for the Guelph Gryphons from 2011 to 2013. He appeared in eight games in 2011, recording seven total tackles and one pass breakup. He started eight games for the team in 2012, accumulating 23 total tackles and 3.5. Finley played in the Gryphons' 42-39 overtime semi final victory over the Queen’s Gaels and in the Yates Cup Final loss to the McMaster Marauders. He also played for Team West at the East West Bowl. He played in six games, all starts, for the Gryphons in 2013, totaling 14.5 tackles, 12 of which were solo, 5.5 sacks and one fumble recovery. Finley recorded 1.5 tackles in the Semi Final win over the Windsor Lancers. He accumulated three solo tackles and one sack in the Quarter Final loss against the Queen’s Gaels. He played in 23 games, including playoffs, during his college career, recording 54 tackles, 10.5 sacks, one pass breakup and one forced fumble. Finley studied Human Kinetics at Guelph.

== Professional career ==
Finley was selected by the Montreal Alouettes with the 22nd pick in the 2014 CFL draft. He played in nine games in 2014, totaling four defensive tackles and two special teams tackles. He recorded two sacks and one special team tackle in the team's two playoff games. Finley played in three games for the Alouettes during the 2015 season.

On February 15, 2017, Finley signed with the Toronto Argonauts as a free agent. In 2017, he registered career high totals in games played (11), defensive tackles (14), and sacks (4). He dressed in both playoff games that year, earning his first Grey Cup championship following the team's victory in the 105th Grey Cup game. On February 11, 2019 the Argonauts extended Finley's contract. He was set to become a free agent. However, he retired on April 30, 2019.
