= Murder of Kristen French =

Murder of Canadian teenager

- French c.1992
- Date: April 16, 1992—April 19, 1992; 34 years ago
- Location: St. Catharines, Ontario, Canada
- Type: Child murder
- Motive: Sexual
- Deaths: 1 (Kristen French)
- Arrests: Paul Bernardo; Karla Homolka
- Verdict: Guilty
- Convictions: Paul Bernardo: First-degree murder, kidnapping, forcible confinement and aggravated sexual assault Karla Homolka: Manslaughter
- Sentence: Paul Bernardo: Life imprisonment with a possibility of parole after 25 years Karla Homolka: 12 years imprisonment

The murder of Kristen French was a high-profile Canadian kidnapping and murder case which occurred in St. Catharines, Ontario. French, a 15-year-old schoolgirl was abducted by serial killers Paul Bernardo and Karla Homolka on April 16, 1992. French was tortured and raped before being murdered on April 19, 1992. Her naked body was found in Burlington on April 30, 1992.

French was the third girl known to have died at the hands of Bernardo and Homolka, after Tammy Homolka and Leslie Mahaffy. Bernardo was convicted for two first-degree murders and two aggravated sexual assaults, and sentenced to life in prison with a possibility of parole after 25 years, while Homolka was sentenced to 12 years imprisonment.

The murder of Kristen French was widely covered by the national media, becoming one of Canada's most notorious cases.

== Biography ==
Kristen Dawn French (May 10, 1976 – April 19, 1992) was a 15-year-old girl from St. Catharines, Ontario. She was the second daughter of Doug and Donna French. Her brother in law is a retired journalism instructor at Cambrian College.

She was a member of a precision ice-skating team which won several medals, and a member of the girls' rowing team at Holy Cross Catholic Secondary School.

== Crime ==
=== Abduction ===
On April 16, 1992, French was walking home from Holy Cross Secondary School. She was approached at the entrance of the Grace Lutheran Church parking lot by Karla Homolka and Paul Bernardo. Homolka got out of the car carrying a map, pretending to need assistance. While French was assisting Homolka with directions, Bernardo snuck up on her from behind and forced her into the car at knifepoint. French was seated in the front seat, with Homolka holding down her hair in order to keep the abductee in check. The kidnapping was seen by several eyewitnesses.

When French did not come home, her parents reported her disappearance to the police. French's shoe was recovered from the parking lot.

=== Murder ===
The medical examiner's report states she was held in captivity for three days, during which Bernardo and Homolka videotaped themselves torturing and subjecting the 15-year-old to sexual humiliation and degradation while forcing her to drink large amounts of alcohol.

French is remembered for declining cooperation with her abductors in the latter period of her abduction: "Some things are worth dying for". She said to Bernardo: "I don't know how your wife can stand being around you."

French was murdered on April 19, 1992; her naked body was found on April 30, 1992, in a ditch along No.1 Sideroad in Burlington, about forty-five minutes from St. Catharines. Her body was found washed and her hair was cut off; Homolka would later testify that it was cut to impede identification. Pathologist Dr. Noel McAuliffe concluded that French was killed by strangulation.

== Conviction ==
On September 1, 1995, Bernardo was convicted of a number of offences, including the two first-degree murders and two aggravated sexual assaults of French and Leslie Mahaffy. He was sentenced to life imprisonment with a possibility of parole after 25 years. On July 6, 1993, Homolka was sentenced to 12 years imprisonment.

== Reactions ==
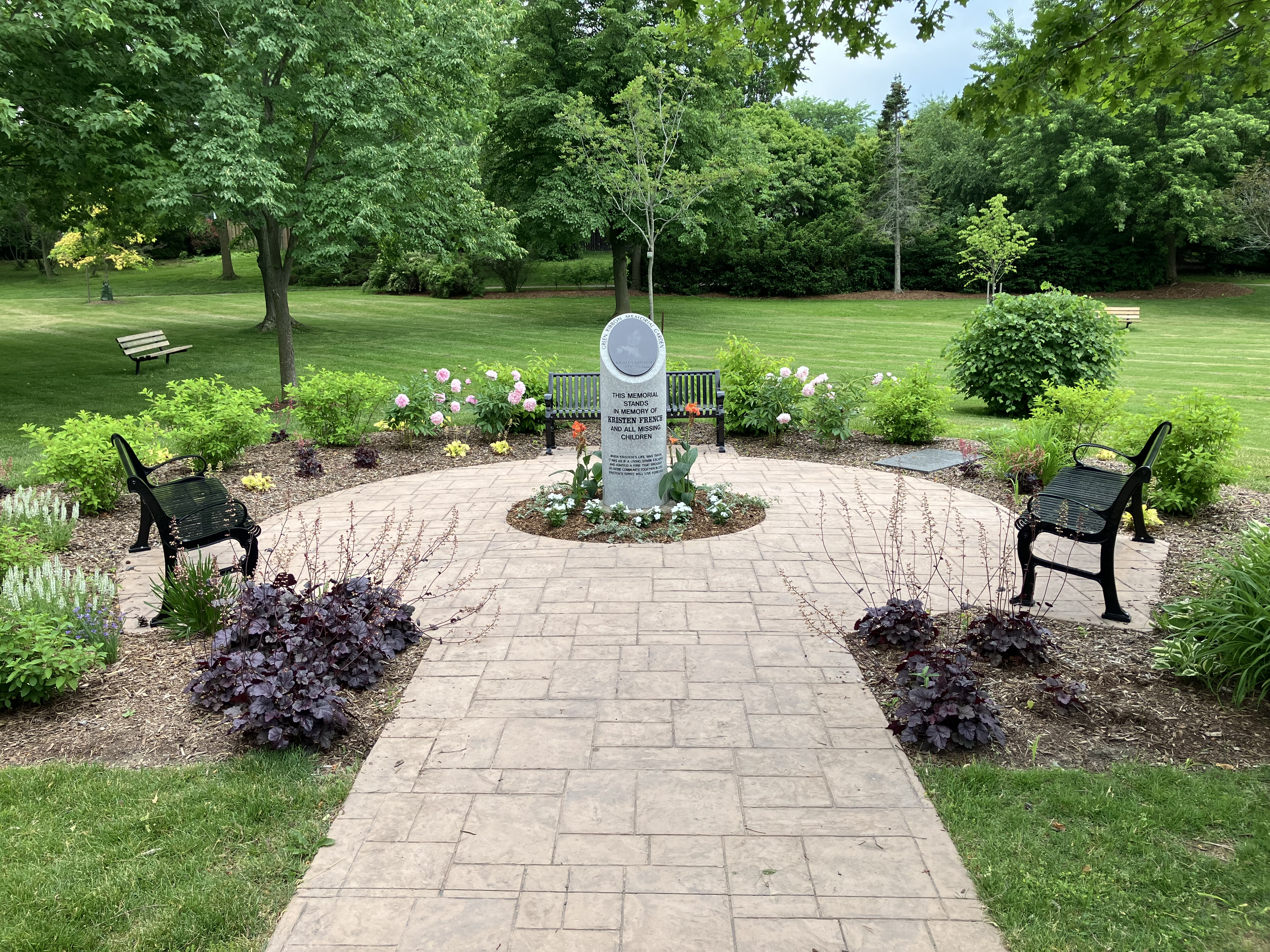
The Green Ribbon Memorial Garden in St. Catharines

While French was missing, her classmates, teachers and friends at Holy Cross Secondary School chose the Green Ribbon of Hope as the symbol for their search. French's school community also gave the name to the Green Ribbon of Hope Campaign, a national campaign continued by Child Find Canada, governments, organizations and individuals to raise funds and awareness for missing children.

The Green Ribbon Trail in St. Catharines was named in her honour, and a monument to French's memory stands at the beginning of the trail. The ribbon also gave its name to the Green Ribbon Task Force, the police group tasked with finding Leslie Mahaffy and French's killers, though they later found themselves embroiled in controversy over the role of media in police investigations.

== See also ==
- Lists of solved missing person cases
