= Dangerous offender =

Designation for some convicted persons

In Canada and England and Wales, certain convicted persons may be designated as dangerous offenders and subject to a longer, or indefinite, term of imprisonment in order to protect the public. Dangerousness in law is a legal establishment of the risk that a person poses to cause harm. Other countries, including Denmark, Norway, Finland, and parts of the United States, have similar provisions of law.

The question of a person's dangerousness predominately occurs when decisions are being considered regarding the future safety of the public at various stages through a suspect or defendant's journey through the criminal justice system. This includes decisions on whether a person can be released on bail or requires to be remanded in police custody, followed by sentencing for certain offences, their confinement (such as what category of prison to send them to), as well as future legal proceedings, such as their suitability to be released, assessed by a parole board.

== Worldwide ==
=== Canada ===
In Canadian criminal law, a convicted person who is designated a dangerous offender may be subjected to an indeterminate prison sentence, whether or not the crime carries a life sentence. The purpose of the legislation is to detain offenders who are deemed too dangerous to be released into society because of their violent tendencies, but whose sentences would not necessarily keep them incarcerated under other legislation, such as the Correctional and Conditional Release Act. Under subsection 761(1) of the Criminal Code, the Parole Board of Canada is required to review the case of an offender with a dangerous offender label after seven years, and parole may be granted as circumstances warrant, but the offender would remain under supervision indefinitely. After the initial review, the Parole Board must conduct subsequent reviews every two years. According to Corrections Canada, on average 24 dangerous offenders are admitted to the Canadian prison system each year. Paul Bernardo is one well-known dangerous offender.

The dangerous offender provisions have been found constitutional: "The individual, on a finding of guilty, is being sentenced for the 'serious personal injury offence' for which he was convicted, albeit in a different way than would ordinarily be done. He is not being punished for what he might do. The punishment flows from the actual commission of a specific offence."

On 17 October 2006, the Canadian government introduced legislation that made it easier for Crown prosecutors to obtain dangerous offender designations. The amendments provide, among other things, that an offender found guilty of a third conviction of a designated violent or sexual offence must prove that he or she does not qualify as a dangerous offender. This legislation was passed in 2008. Under previous legislation, the Crown had to prove that the individual qualified as a dangerous offender. The amendment reverses the onus for individuals convicted of three violent offences. Such individuals must now demonstrate to a court that despite the three convictions, they should not be designated as dangerous offenders.

As of 2019–2020, there were 874 persons with the dangerous offender designation. Of these 874 designated offenders, 743 (85%) were in custody, whereas 131 (15%) were on conditional release in the community.

Canadian courts also have the option of designating convicts "long term offenders". A hearing is held after sentencing, and, if a judge rules the accused is likely to re-offend after release, a 10-year period of community supervision is required after the sentence is completed.

=== Denmark ===
In Denmark, offenders who commit dangerous crimes, such as murder, arson, assault, rape, child molestation or robbery may receive a "custody sentence" (Danish: forvaringsdom), which lacks a definite time period. This sentence is often bestowed on offenders with deviant personalities (for example, antisocial personality disorder). The detainees are typically housed in the Institution of Herstedvester. There are periodic pardoning reviews and on average the offenders serve 14 years and 7 months before being released.

=== England and Wales ===
In England and Wales, the sentencing of dangerous offenders is governed by the Sentencing Act 2020. It was governed by sections 224–236 of the Criminal Justice Act 2003, until the repeal of those sections by the Sentencing Act 2020.

The assessment of dangerousness is a statutory part of the law on a defendant being sentenced for specified violent, sexual or terrorism offences. The court may take into account as prior convictions that the offender has, from a court in any place in the world, as well as information about a pattern of behaviour, including in which any offences, either the ones on trial or previously tried, have involved. Previous proceedings that could be taken into account are disciplinary proceedings or convictions if the person was part of the armed forces, or any civil proceedings. The court should consider the level of danger the public are at risk to by the defendant and whether there is a 'reliable estimate' of how long they will remain a danger.

==== Case law ====
- Lang and others provides that for a person to be dangerous, the risk a person poses must be considerable. It should not be assumed that a significant risk exists because a 'foreseen offence is serious'.
- Johnson provides that the existence of previous convictions does 'not compel such a finding' in the same way the absence of previous convictions does not preclude a defendant from being found dangerous.
- R v Considine; R v Davis provides that the crucial word in assessing dangerousness is 'information', meaning that this is not restricted to evidence, previous convictions of behavioural patterns of a defendant. However, it is not appropriate for a Newton hearing to decide 'whether the defendant had committed a discrete, but similar, offence to the one before the court', just for the purpose of assessing dangerousness.

=== Finland ===
In Finland, a prosecutor can demand an evaluation of the danger a serial offender poses to others. Such an evaluation is carried out by forensic psychiatrists of the Finnish Institute for Health and Welfare. The court has final discretion whether such a demand is accepted and whether the outcome of the evaluation leads to a change in sentencing. The result of the evaluation can either be negative or the offender is classified as being "particularly dangerous to the life, health or freedom of another". The reliability of these evaluations has been questioned by legal scholars and the forensic psychiatrists themselves, because such evaluations inevitably have to predict an offender's future criminality, which is uncertain.

According to the Finnish Criminal Code, such offenders maybe sentenced to a special punishment referred to as a "combination penalty", where the offender cannot be released under parole during a period of imprisonment and after the prison term has been served, is subject to one year's supervision. A court cannot impose such a punishment without the demand of the prosecutor. Additionally it is required that multiple serious offences have been committed by the offender within the past ten years or the offence in question occurred within three years of release from life imprisonment or from a previous period of the special "combination penalty". An exhaustive list of the serious offences that qualify for such a punishment is stated in the criminal code. If the offence in question with the previous history accounted for, does not call for a sentence of more than three years, such a penalty shall not be imposed. The imprisonment part of the sentence may also not exceed the general limits for fixed-term sentences, 12 years for a single offence, 15 years for multiple offences tried at the same occasion.

The "combination penalty" superseded the previous type of special penalty of imprisonment without parole (lit. serving the whole punishment in prison). Offenders serving that penalty could however request exceptional parole from a court, but only after five-sixths of the term had been served. The new type of punishment excludes all parole eligibility. Including a supervision period has been viewed as an important development by prison and forensic psychiatry officials, citing high reoffending rates of such convicts. It is the most severe penalty that can be applied to a person who has not committed a crime that allows for life imprisonment. In practice, life imprisonment in Finland is reserved exclusively to cases of aggravated homicide. A combination penalty has also been applied to other crimes, such as repeated acts of aggravated rape, child sexual abuse and homicide. Application of this penalty is very rare.

=== United States ===
In the United States, "Dangerous offender" statutes are defined on a state-by-state basis and are applied at sentencing such that the enhanced "dangerous offender" sentence stems from the original illegal activity. A person under "dangerous offender" sentencing is typically held for a minimum term that coincides with the sentence the person would have received without the "dangerous offender" sentence, and thereafter is subject to review of the person's state of mind as a determination of eligibility for release.

Alternatively, a person can be civilly committed if a judicial hearing determines that a concurrent mental disorder makes the person likely to remain dangerous because of a lack of self-control. This issue arose in the case of sex offenders in Kansas v. Hendricks (1997) in which the court did allow limited commitment; the court reversed itself on the very same issue in Kansas v. Crane (2002) imposing much stricter commitment standards and a higher burden of proof. Various state and federal sex offender registry laws impose additional post-conviction requirements for sex offenders.
