= St. Catharines General Hospital =

Hospital in Ontario, Canada (1865–2013)

- The St. Catharines General Hospital Foundation

Geography
- Location: Niagara Region, Ontario, Canada
- Coordinates: 43°9′47.31″N 79°13′51.35″W

Organization
- Care system: Medicare
- Type: General; Community

Services
- Emergency department: Level III trauma centre
- Beds: 240

History
- Founded: 1865
- Closed: 2013
- Demolished: 2020

Links
- Website: http://www.niagarahealth.on.ca/
- Lists: Hospitals in Canada

The St. Catharines General Hospital was a general hospital established in 1865 in St. Catharines, Ontario, Canada, serving the Niagara Region. First established as a general and marine cottage hospital, it moved to Queenston Street in 1870. The hospital closed on March 24, 2013 after the new Niagara Health System St. Catharines site opened on Fourth Avenue.

== Reuse of property ==
In 2017, Oakdale Inc. purchased the property. Demolition of the hospital commenced in 2019 and was completed in 2020. Some parts of the hospital, such as the decorative arch, were preserved for reconstruction due to their historical value. Bricks from the hospital were sold and the proceeds were donated to the Lincoln County Humane Society. During the demolition, underground tunnels and an underground swimming pool were discovered. One tunnel was connected to a church; another appeared to go underneath Queenston Street, but was covered with bricks. As of 2024, a mixed-use 1,131-unit building is planned to be built but this project has been delayed.

== See also ==
- Welland House Hotel
