= Paul Bernardo =

Canadian serial killer and serial rapist (born 1964)

- Mugshot of Bernardo taken by Kingston Penitentiary, November 1995
- Born: Paul Kenneth Bernardo; August 27, 1964 (age 62); Scarborough, Ontario, Canada
- Other names: The Scarborough Rapist; The Schoolgirl Killer; Paul Jason Teale
- Spouse: Karla Homolka (m. 1991; div. 1994)
- Convictions: First-degree murder (x2); Kidnapping (x2); Forcible confinement (x2); Aggravated sexual assault (x2); Committing an indignity to a body; Various related but publicly unnamed charges
- Penalty: Life imprisonment with a possibility of parole after 25 years, including a dangerous offender designation, in 1995
- Accomplice: Karla Homolka

Details
- Victims: 3 killed; at least 14 raped and 6 attempted to rape
- Span of crimes: 1986–1992
- Country: Canada
- Date apprehended: February 17, 1993
- Imprisoned at: Kingston Penitentiary (until 2013); Millhaven Institution (2013–2023); La Macaza Institution (2023–present)

Paul Kenneth Bernardo (born August 27, 1964), also known as Paul Jason Teale, is a Canadian serial rapist and serial killer dubbed the Scarborough Rapist and Schoolgirl Killer. He initially committed a series of rapes in Scarborough, Ontario, a district of Toronto, between 1986 and 1990, before meeting Karla Homolka, with whom he committed rape leading to the death of her sister Tammy, followed by two murders in 1991 and 1992.

After his capture and conviction, Bernardo was sentenced to life imprisonment and was declared a dangerous offender, making it unlikely that he will ever be released from prison. Following his conviction, Bernardo confessed to ten more rapes committed a year before the spree officially ascribed to the Scarborough Rapist. Homolka was given a lighter sentence in exchange for testifying against Bernardo as part of a controversial plea bargain; she was released from prison in 2005. Bernardo has been denied parole three times.

== Early life ==
Paul Bernardo was born in Scarborough, Ontario, then a municipality adjacent to Toronto, on August 27, 1964. He was the third and youngest child of Kenneth Walter Bernardo and Marilyn Elizabeth Bernardo, née Eastman. Bernardo's father often sexually abused his daughter, Paul's older sister, Debra, in front of other family members, and would eventually be charged with crimes involving voyeurism and pedophilia. Bernardo's mother often withdrew from her family due to depression and agoraphobia, eventually moving into the basement.

Bernardo presented himself as being a happy and well-adjusted child despite his family's dysfunction, and was an active member of Scouts Canada. Beneath the charming façade, he gradually developed pyromaniac inclinations and dark sexual fantasies, one of which involved creating a "virgin farm" where he would breed virgin girls to rape.

After a fight between his parents in 1981, Bernardo, then aged 16, was informed by his mother that he was the result of an extramarital affair and that Kenneth was not his biological father. Repulsed, Bernardo began to call his mother a "slut" and a "whore"; she reciprocated by calling him a "bastard from hell." Later, after growing weary of his domineering behaviour, Bernardo's first girlfriend left him for one of his friends. In retaliation, Bernardo set fire to all of her belongings to which he had access.

Bernardo attended Sir Wilfrid Laurier Collegiate Institute and, in 1982, the University of Toronto Scarborough (UTSC), where another notorious Canadian murderer, Russell Williams, was coincidentally two academic years behind him. Bernardo and his college friends practised pickup techniques on young women they met in bars and were fairly successful. Bernardo delighted in humiliating his dates in public and engaging in aggressive anal intercourse in bed. These relationships became increasingly violent and unstable, and he threatened to kill his partners if they disclosed his abuse. In 1986, Bernardo was served with restraining orders by two women after he made obscene phone calls.

In October 1987, Bernardo met Karla Homolka while she was visiting Scarborough to attend a pet convention. The two shared an immediate attraction, as Karla encouraged Bernardo's sadistic sexual behaviour.

== Scarborough Rapist cases ==
Between 1986 and 1990, Bernardo committed increasingly vicious serial rapes in and around Scarborough. He attacked most of his victims after stalking them as they got off buses late in the evening. Known incidents are:

- May 4, 1987: Rape of a 21-year-old Scarborough woman in front of her parents' house after Bernardo followed her home.
- May 14, 1987: Rape of a 19-year-old woman in the backyard of her parents' house.
- July 17, 1987: Attempted rape of a young woman. Although he beat the victim, Bernardo abandoned the attack when she fought back.
- September 29, 1987: Attempted rape of a 15-year-old girl. Bernardo broke into the victim's house and entered her bedroom. He jumped on her back, put his hand over her mouth, threatened her with a knife, bruised her face and bit her ear. He fled when the victim's mother entered the bedroom and screamed. Anthony Hanemaayer, then aged 19, was wrongfully accused of the attack in 1989. He served sixteen months in prison after pleading guilty to avoid a much longer sentence ranging from six to ten years. He was exonerated after Bernardo confessed to the crime in 2006.
- December 16, 1987: Rape of a 15-year-old girl. The next day, the Toronto Police Service (TPS) issued a warning to women in Scarborough travelling alone at night, especially those riding buses.
- December 23, 1987: Rape of a 17-year-old girl. At this point, he began to be known as the Scarborough Rapist.
- April 18, 1988: Attack of a 17-year-old girl.
- May 25, 1988: Bernardo was nearly caught by a uniformed police officer staking out a bus shelter. Although the officer noticed him hiding under a tree and pursued him on foot, Bernardo escaped.
- May 30, 1988: Rape of an 18-year-old woman in Mississauga, Ontario, about 40 kilometres (25 miles) southwest of Scarborough.
- October 4, 1988: Attempted rape in Scarborough. Although his intended victim fought him off, Bernardo inflicted two stab wounds to her thigh and buttock which required twelve stitches.
- November 16, 1988: Rape of an 18-year-old woman in the backyard of her parents' house. A dedicated task force assigned to identify the Scarborough Rapist was organized the next day.
- December 27, 1988: Attempted rape, with a neighbour chasing Bernardo off.
- June 20, 1989: Attempted rape; the young woman fought back, and her screams alerted neighbours. Bernardo fled with scratches on his face.
- August 15, 1989: Rape of a 22-year-old woman.
- November 21, 1989: Rape of a 15-year-old girl Bernardo saw in a bus shelter.
- December 22, 1989: Rape of a 19-year-old woman.
- May 26, 1990: Rape of a 19-year-old woman. The victim's vivid recollection of her attacker enabled police to create a computerized composite sketch, which was released two days later and publicized in Toronto and surrounding areas.

=== Investigation and release ===
Investigators received two tips pointing to Bernardo over the summer of 1990. The first, in June, had been filed by a bank employee. The second was from Tina Smirnis, wife of one of the three Smirnis brothers who were among Bernardo's closest friends. Smirnis told detectives that Bernardo "had been 'called in' on a previous rape investigation – once in December 1987 – but he had never been interviewed." Bernardo frequently talked about his sex life to Smirnis and said that he liked rough sex.

In July, two months after police received tips that Bernardo resembled the Scarborough Rapist composite, he was interviewed by detectives. From May to September 1990, the TPS submitted more than 130 suspects' samples for DNA testing. Police interviewed Bernardo again on November 20 for thirty-five minutes. Bernardo voluntarily provided DNA samples for forensic testing. When detectives asked Bernardo why he thought he was being investigated for the rapes, he admitted that he resembled the composite. Reportedly, detectives found Bernardo more credible than Smirnis.

== Rape and death of Tammy Homolka ==
By 1990, Bernardo had lost his job as an accountant and was smuggling cigarettes across the nearby Canada–United States border. He spent long periods of time with Karla's family, who enjoyed his company and were unaware of his criminal activities. Although he was engaged to Karla, Bernardo soon became obsessed with her 14-year-old younger sister Tammy, peering into her window and entering her room to masturbate while she slept. Karla aided Bernardo in these acts by breaking the windows in her sister's room, allowing him access. According to Bernardo's later testimony, Karla laced spaghetti sauce with crushed valium she had stolen from her employer at an animal clinic. She served it to her sister, who soon lost consciousness. Bernardo then raped Tammy while Karla watched. After one minute, Tammy regained consciousness.

Six months before their 1991 wedding, Karla stole the anesthetic agent halothane from the animal clinic. On December 23, 1990, Bernardo and Karla administered sleeping pills to 15-year-old Tammy in a rum-and-eggnog cocktail. When Tammy lost consciousness, the couple undressed her and Karla applied a halothane-soaked cloth to her sister's nose and mouth. Karla wanted to "give Tammy's virginity to Bernardo for Christmas"; according to her, Bernardo was disappointed that he was not Karla's first sex partner. With Tammy's parents sleeping upstairs, the couple videotaped themselves raping Tammy in the basement. Tammy began to choke on vomit. They tried to revive her and called 9-1-1 after hiding evidence, dressing Tammy and moving her into her bedroom. A few hours later, Tammy was pronounced dead at St. Catharines General Hospital without regaining consciousness.

Despite being observed vacuuming and washing laundry in the middle of the night, and despite a chemical burn on Tammy's face, the municipal coroner and Karla's family accepted Bernardo and Karla's version of events. The official cause of Tammy's death was ruled accidental, the result of choking on vomit after consumption of alcohol. After Tammy's death, Bernardo and Karla videotaped themselves engaging in sexual intercourse, with Karla wearing Tammy's clothing and pretending to be her.

The couple moved out of the Homolka household to a rented bungalow in Port Dalhousie soon afterward. During Tammy's funeral, witnesses saw Bernardo caressing her body in its open casket. Inside the casket, Bernardo and Karla surreptitiously placed a copy of their wedding invitation, which showed a photo of the couple grinning, along with a note. These items were discovered when Tammy's body was exhumed three years later, and were then removed at the request of Karla's family.

In 2001, the magazine Elm Street published an article which implied that forensic evidence proved that Tammy's death was not an accident and that her sister had deliberately administered an overdose of halothane. The publication described Karla as a "malignant narcissist" who was so incensed by her fiancé's attraction to her sister that she removed Tammy from his affections permanently.

== Schoolgirl murders ==
=== Leslie Mahaffy ===
Early in the morning on June 15, 1991, while detouring through Burlington to steal licence plates, Bernardo came across 14-year-old Leslie Mahaffy, who had been locked out of her house for missing curfew. According to his later account, Bernardo left his car and approached Mahaffy, saying that he was planning to break into a neighbour's house. Unfazed, she asked if he had any cigarettes. At this point he led her to his car, blindfolded her, forced her into the car, drove her to Port Dalhousie, and then informed Karla that they had a victim.

Bernardo and Karla videotaped themselves torturing and sexually abusing Mahaffy while they listened to pop music. At one point on the tape, Bernardo told her, "You're doing a good job, Leslie, a damned good job," adding: "The next two hours are going to determine what I do to you. Right now, you're scoring perfect." On another segment of tape, played during Bernardo's trial, the assault escalated. Mahaffy cried out in pain and begged Bernardo to stop. In the Crown description of the scene, he was sodomizing her while her hands were bound with twine.

Mahaffy later told Bernardo that her blindfold seemed to be slipping, which signaled the possibility that she could identify her attackers if she lived. The following day, Bernardo claimed, Karla fed her a lethal dose of Halcion; Karla claimed that Bernardo strangled her. The couple hid Mahaffy's body in their basement the day before Karla's family visited the house for a dinner party. Afterward, they decided to dismember Mahaffy's body and encase each part of her remains in cement.

Bernardo bought a dozen bags of cement at a hardware store the following day. He kept the receipts, which were later used as evidence. After Bernardo cut apart the body using his grandfather's circular saw, the couple made a number of trips to dump the cement blocks in Lake Gibson, 18 kilometres (11 mi) south of Port Dalhousie. At least one of the blocks weighed 90 kg (200 pounds) and was beyond their ability to sink. It lay near the shore, where it was found on June 29, 1991, coincidentally on Bernardo and Karla's wedding day. Mahaffy's orthodontic appliance was instrumental in identifying her.

Several days before Karla's release from prison in July 2005, Bernardo was interviewed by police and his lawyer, Tony Bryant. According to Bryant, Bernardo stated that he had always intended to free the girls he and Karla had kidnapped. However, when Mahaffy's blindfold fell off, Karla was concerned that Mahaffy would identify Bernardo and report the couple to the police. Bernardo claimed that Karla had planned to murder Mahaffy by injecting an air bubble into her bloodstream, triggering an air embolism.

=== Kristen French ===
During the after-school hours of April 16, 1992, Bernardo and Karla drove through St. Catharines to look for more potential victims. Although students were still going home, the streets were generally empty. As they passed Holy Cross Secondary School, the couple spotted 15-year-old Kristen French walking alone. After they pulled into the parking lot of nearby Grace Lutheran Church, Karla exited the car carrying a map, pretending to need assistance. When French looked at the map, Bernardo attacked her from behind and forced her into the front seat of the car at knifepoint. From the back seat, Karla subdued French by pulling her hair.

After French failed to arrive home, her parents became convinced that she met with foul play and notified police. Within twenty-four hours the Niagara Regional Police Service (NRP) assembled a search team, scoured the area around French's after-school route and found several witnesses who had seen the abduction from different locations. French's shoe, recovered from the parking lot, underscored the seriousness of the abduction.

Over the Easter weekend, Bernardo and Karla videotaped themselves torturing, raping and sodomizing French, forcing her to drink large amounts of alcohol and submit to Bernardo. At his trial, Crown prosecutor Ray Houlahan said that Bernardo always intended to kill French because she was never blindfolded and could identify her captors. The following day, Bernardo and Karla murdered French before visiting Karla's family for Easter dinner. Karla testified at her trial that Bernardo strangled French for seven minutes while she watched. Bernardo claimed that Karla beat French with a rubber mallet because she tried to escape, and French was strangled with a noose around her neck which was secured to a hope chest; Karla then went to fix her hair.

French's nude body was found on April 30, 1992, in a ditch in Burlington, about forty-five minutes from St. Catharines and a short distance from the cemetery where Mahaffy is buried. She had been washed and her hair cut off. Although it was thought that the hair was removed and kept as a trophy, Karla testified that it was cut to impede identification.

== Additional victims ==
In addition to the three confirmed murders ascribed to Bernardo and Karla, suspicions remain about other possible victims or intended victims:

- Derek Finkle's 1997 book No Claim to Mercy presented evidence tying Bernardo to the presumed murder of 22-year-old Elizabeth Bain, who disappeared on June 19, 1990. Bain told her mother that she was going to "check the tennis schedule" at UTSC. Three days later, her car was found with a large bloodstain on the backseat. Bernardo matched the description of a man in the area where Bain was last seen, and later confessed to at least eight attacks in and around the same location. Bain's boyfriend, Robert Baltovich, was convicted of second-degree murder in her death on March 31, 1992. During his trial and imprisonment, Baltovich and his lawyers repeatedly alleged that Bernardo was the perpetrator. The Court of Appeal for Ontario set aside Baltovich's conviction on December 2, 2004. At his retrial on April 22, 2008, the Crown told the court that no evidence would be called against Baltovich and asked the jury to acquit him. When questioned about Bain in 2007, Bernardo said: "The answer to that is no. But the 800 pound gorilla in the room is that it is a life-to-25 sentence."
- Shortly after Tammy's funeral, Karla's parents left town and her sister Lori visited grandparents in Mississauga, leaving the Homolka residence empty. According to author Stephen Williams, during the weekend of January 12, 1991, Bernardo abducted a girl, took her to the house, and raped her while Karla watched. He then dropped her off on a deserted road near Lake Gibson. Bernardo and Karla called her "January girl."
- At about 5:30 a.m. on April 6, 1991, Bernardo abducted a 14-year-old who was training to be a coxswain for a local rowing team. The girl was distracted by a blonde woman who waved at her from her car, enabling Bernardo to drag her into shrubbery near the rowing club. Bernardo sexually assaulted the girl, forced her to remove her clothes and made her wait five minutes during which he disappeared.
- On June 7, 1991, Karla invited a 15-year-old girl, known as "Jane Doe" in the trials, whom she had befriended at a pet store two years earlier, into the couple's residence. After being drugged by Karla, "Doe" was sexually assaulted by both her and Bernardo, which was videotaped. In August, "Doe" was invited back to the residence and was again drugged. Karla called 9-1-1 for help after the girl vomited and stopped breathing while being raped. The ambulance was recalled after Bernardo and Karla resuscitated her.
- On July 28, 1991, Bernardo stalked 21-year-old Sydney Kershen after he saw her while driving home from work. On August 9, he resumed stalking her. This time, Kershen took evasive action, stopping at her boyfriend's house just prior to his arrival. After spotting Bernardo, the boyfriend gave chase, came across Bernardo's gold Nissan and took note of the licence plate. The couple reported the incident to the NRP, which established that the car belonged to Bernardo. An NRP officer visited his house and saw the car parked in the driveway, but did not pursue the matter, nor submit an official police report.
- A newspaper clipping found during the police search of Bernardo's house described a rape that occurred in Hawaii during the couple's honeymoon there in the summer of 1991. The article, the rape's similarity to Bernardo's modus operandi and its occurrence during the couple's presence in Hawaii led police to speculate on Bernardo's involvement. Law enforcement officials in both Canada and the U.S. have stated their belief that Bernardo was responsible for this rape, but the case was never prosecuted due to extradition issues.
- On November 30, 1991, Terri Anderson, a grade nine student at Lakeport Secondary School, adjacent to French's Catholic school, vanished less than 2 kilometres (1.2 mi) from the parking lot where French was later abducted. In April 1992, the NRP stated they had no evidence to suggest a link to Bernardo. Anderson's body was ultimately found in the water at Port Dalhousie. The coroner saw no evidence of foul play, despite the difficulties of determining such factors in a body that had been in the water for six months. The coroner's ruling that her death was by drowning – probably as a result of drinking beer and taking LSD – was controversial in light of the circumstances of the Mahaffy and French murders.
- On March 29, 1992, Bernardo stalked and videotaped sisters Shanna and Kerry Patrich from his car, following them to their parents' house. The sisters incorrectly recorded his licence plate number; Shanna reported the incident to the NRP on March 31, and was given an incident number should further information develop. On April 18, while French was still being held captive, Bernardo was spotted by Kerry while he had gone out to buy dinner and rent a movie. Despite failing to track him to his house, Kerry got a better description of his licence plate and car, which she reported to the NRP. This information, however, was mishandled by police.
- In 2006, Bernardo confessed to at least ten more sexual assaults dating back to March 1986, including the 1987 assault of a 15-year-old girl. Another man, Anthony Hanemaayer, had been convicted of the assault and served a full sentence for it. On June 25, 2008, the Court of Appeal for Ontario overturned the conviction and exonerated Hanemaayer.

== Investigation and arrest ==
Bernardo and Karla were questioned by police several times in connection with the Scarborough Rapist investigation, Tammy's untimely death and Bernardo's stalking of other women before French's abduction. On May 12, 1992, Bernardo was briefly interviewed by an NRP sergeant and constable, who decided that he was an unlikely suspect despite his admission that he had previously been questioned in connection to the Scarborough Rapist. Three days later, the Green Ribbon Task Force was convened to investigate the murders of Mahaffy and French. Bernardo and Karla had applied to have their surnames legally changed to Teale, which Bernardo had taken from the serial killer antagonist in the film Criminal Law (1988). At the end of May, John Motile, an acquaintance of Smirnis and Bernardo, reported Bernardo as a possible suspect in the murders.

In December 1992, the Centre of Forensic Sciences finally began testing DNA samples provided by Bernardo two years earlier. On December 27, Bernardo severely beat Karla about the face with a flashlight, leaving multiple bruises. Claiming that she had been in an automobile accident, Karla returned to work on January 4, 1993. Her skeptical co-workers contacted her parents, and although they rescued her the following day by physically removing her from Bernardo's house, Karla ventured back inside to frantically search for something. Karla's parents took her to St. Catharines General Hospital, where she gave a statement to the NRP that she was a battered spouse and filed charges against Bernardo. Bernardo was arrested and later released on his own recognizance. Karla moved in with an aunt and uncle in Brampton.

=== Arrest ===
Twenty-six months after Bernardo submitted a DNA sample, the TPS were informed that it matched that of the Scarborough Rapist and immediately placed him under 24-hour surveillance. Metro Toronto Sexual Assault Squad investigators interviewed Karla on February 9, 1993. Despite hearing their suspicions about Bernardo, Karla focused on his abuse of her. Later that night she divulged to her aunt and uncle that Bernardo was the Scarborough Rapist, that the couple were involved in the rape and murder of Mahaffy and French, and that the rapes had been recorded.

The NRP subsequently reopened its investigation of Tammy's death. Two days later Karla met with Niagara Falls attorney George Walker, who sought legal immunity from the Crown in exchange for Karla's cooperation in the case against Bernardo. She was also placed under 24-hour surveillance. The couple's name change was approved on February 13, 1993. The next day, Walker met with Crown Criminal Law Office director Murray Segal. After Walker told Segal about the videotapes, Segal advised him that, due to Homolka's involvement in the crimes, full immunity was not a possibility.

On February 17, detectives arrested Bernardo on several charges, and obtained a search warrant of his house. Because his link to the murders was weak, the warrant was limited; no evidence which was not expected and documented in the warrant could be removed from his property, and all videotapes found by police had to be viewed inside the house. Damage had to be kept to a minimum; police could not tear down walls looking for the tapes. The search of the house, including updated warrants, lasted seventy-one days. The only tape found by police had a brief segment of Karla performing oral sex on "Jane Doe."

During a call from jail, Bernardo told his lawyer, Ken Murray, that the videotapes were hidden in a ceiling light fixture in the upstairs bathroom. Murray found the tapes and hid them from investigators. After Murray resigned as Bernardo's lawyer, his new attorney, John Rosen, turned the tapes over to police. On May 5, Walker was informed that the government was offering Karla a plea bargain of twelve years' imprisonment which she had one week to accept. If she declined, the government would charge her with two counts of first-degree murder, one count of second-degree murder and other crimes. Walker accepted the offer, and Karla later agreed to it. On May 14, Karla's plea bargain was finalized, and she began giving statements to investigators. Karla told police that Bernardo boasted that he had raped as many as thirty women, twice as many as the police had suspected.

=== Publication ban ===
Citing the need to protect Bernardo's right to a fair trial, a publication ban was imposed on Karla's preliminary inquiry. The Crown had applied for the ban, which was imposed on July 5 by Francis Kovacs of the Ontario Court of Justice. Through her lawyers, Karla supported the ban; Bernardo's lawyers argued that he would be prejudged by the ban, since Karla had been portrayed as his victim. Four media outlets and one author also opposed the ban. Some lawyers argued that rumours could damage the future trial process more than the publication of evidence. In February 1994, Karla divorced Bernardo.

Public access to the Internet effectively nullified the court's order, as did proximity to the U.S.-Canada border. American journalists, not subject to the publication ban, published details of Karla's testimony, which in turn were distributed by "electronic ban-breakers." Newspapers in Buffalo, Detroit, Washington, D.C., New York City and the United Kingdom, as well as radio and television stations close to the border, also divulged the details. Canadians brought copies of The Buffalo News across the border, prompting orders to the NRP to arrest all those with more than one copy at the border; extra copies were confiscated. Copies of other newspapers, including The New York Times, were turned back at the border or not accepted by distributors in Ontario. Gordon Domm, a retired police officer who defied the publication ban by distributing details from foreign media, was convicted of two counts of contempt of court.

== Trial, conviction, and incarceration ==
Bernardo was tried for the murders of French and Mahaffy in 1995, and his trial included detailed testimony from Karla and videotapes of the rapes and torture. Bernardo testified that the deaths were accidental, later claiming that Karla was the actual killer. On September 1, 1995, Paul Bernardo was convicted of a number of offences, including the two first-degree murders and two aggravated sexual assaults, and sentenced to life in prison without parole for at least twenty-five years. He was designated a dangerous offender, making him unlikely to ever be released.

Karla's plea bargain was criticized by many Canadians since Bernardo's first defence lawyer, Ken Murray, had withheld the videotapes exposing her culpability for seventeen months. The videotapes were considered crucial evidence, and prosecutors said that they would never have agreed to the plea bargain if they had seen them. Murray was later acquitted of obstruction of justice and faced a disciplinary hearing by the Law Society of Upper Canada.

Although Bernardo was kept in the segregation unit at Kingston Penitentiary for his own safety, he was still attacked and harassed; he was punched in the face by another inmate when he returned from a shower in 1996. In June 1999, five convicts tried to storm his segregation range and a riot squad used gas to disperse them.

On February 21, 2006, the Toronto Star reported that Bernardo had admitted sexually assaulting at least ten other women in attacks not previously attributed to him. Most were in 1986, a year before the spree officially attributed to the Scarborough Rapist. Authorities suspected Bernardo in other crimes, including a string of rapes in Amherst, New York, and the drowning of Terri Anderson in St. Catharines, but he has never acknowledged his involvement. Bernardo's lawyer, Anthony G. Bryant, reportedly forwarded the information to legal authorities in November 2005.

In 2006, Bernardo gave a prison interview in which he claimed that he had reformed and would make a good parole candidate. He became eligible to petition a jury for early parole in 2008 under the faint hope clause (since he committed multiple murders before the 1997 criminal-code amendment) but did not do so. In 2015, Bernardo applied for day parole in Toronto. According to the victims' lawyer, Tim Danson, it is unlikely that Bernardo will ever be released in any capacity due to his dangerous offender status. In September 2013, Bernardo was transferred to Millhaven Institution in Bath, where he was reportedly segregated from other inmates.

In November 2015, Bernardo self-published A MAD World Order, a violent, fictional, 631-page e-book on Amazon. By November 15, the book was reportedly an Amazon bestseller, but was removed from the website due to public outcry. In October 2018, Bernardo had been set to go to trial for possession of a "shank" weapon while incarcerated. However, the prosecution dropped the charges when they determined that there was no reasonable probability of conviction.

Bernardo became eligible for parole in February 2018. On October 17 of that year, he was denied day and full parole by the Parole Board of Canada. His next parole hearing took place on June 22, 2021; it took only one hour of deliberation by the presiding judge for his application to be turned down.

In May 2023, after spending a decade at Millhaven Institution, Bernardo was transferred to La Macaza Institution, a medium-security facility in Quebec, where he will continue to serve his indeterminate sentence. The transfer caused controversy, and initially the reason for the transfer was not provided to the public. Bernardo had successfully applied to be moved there. In light of public outrage raised by the transfer, Correctional Service Canada announced in June that it was to review the decision. On July 20, Commissioner Anne Kelly explained in a thirty-minute press conference that the review board found the transfer to be "sound" in view of the passage of Bill C-83, An Act to amend the Corrections and Conditional Release Act and another Act.

On July 26, 2023, Public Safety Minister Marco Mendicino was dropped from cabinet and replaced by Dominic LeBlanc during a cabinet shuffle, with the media attributing his demotion to the controversy around the Bernardo transfer. The day after LeBlanc was installed, The Globe and Mail wrote an article covering his opinion that the legislation was inconsequential, while Pierre Poilievre, the Leader of the Opposition, said that this was an example of "soft-on-crime" policies on the part of Prime Minister Justin Trudeau's government.

Bernardo's next parole hearing was on November 26, 2024. His victims' families were initially barred from attending in person because of safety concerns, but that decision was reversed by the parole board. Bernardo was denied parole for a third time by the Parole Board of Canada.

== Law-enforcement review ==
After Bernardo's 1995 conviction, the Ontario government appointed Archie Campbell to review the roles played by the police services during the investigation. In his 1996 report, Campbell found that a lack of coordination, cooperation and communications by police and other elements of the judicial system contributed to a serial predator "falling through the cracks." One of Campbell's key recommendations was for an automated case-management system for Ontario's police services to use in investigations of homicides and sexual assaults. Ontario is the only place in the world with this type of computerized case-management network. Since 2002, all municipal police services and the Ontario Provincial Police have had access to this network, known as PowerCase.

== Psychology ==
Bernardo scored 35 out of 40 on the Psychopathy Checklist, a psychological assessment tool used to assess the presence of psychopathy in individuals. Bernardo's score of 35 falls midway between the minimum score required to qualify a person for a diagnosis of psychopathy (i.e., 30) and the maximum possible score of 40. Karla, by contrast, scored 5 out of 40. At his October 17, 2018, parole meeting, evidence from expert psychiatric reports found that Bernardo had "deviant sexual interests and [he] met the diagnostic criteria of sexual sadism, voyeurism, and paraphilia not otherwise specified."

The reports stated that he "met the criteria for narcissistic personality disorder and [met the requirement for] a diagnosis of psychopathy," meaning he was thereby "more likely to repeat violent sexual offending." The reports concluded that Bernardo "showed minimal insight into [his] offending, which is consistent with file information that suggests [he] has been keen over the years to come up with [his] own unsubstantiated reasons for [his] criminal behaviour."

== In popular culture ==
=== Television and film ===
- Episodes of Law & Order ("Fools for Love", season 10), Law & Order: Special Victims Unit ("Damaged", season 4 and "Pure", season 6), Close to Home ("Truly, Madly, Deeply", season 2) and The Inspector Lynley Mysteries (2007's "Know Thine Enemy") were inspired by the case.
- In the second episode of the Canadian crime drama Da Vinci's Inquest, a homicide detective remarks that the Violent Crime Linkage Analysis System (ViCLAS) would have helped apprehend Bernardo sooner. The two-part season finale follows the investigation of a married serial killer couple whose modus operandi resembles that of Bernardo and Homolka.
- Dark Heart, Iron Hand, an MSNBC documentary rebroadcast as "To Love and To Kill" on MSNBC Investigates, concerned the case.
- In 2004, producers from Quantum Entertainment (a Los Angeles-based production company) announced the release of Karla, with the working title Deadly. Misha Collins portrayed Bernardo in the film alongside Laura Prepon, who starred as Karla Homolka.
- Another documentary aired on the Discovery+ streaming service via the sub-channel Investigation Discovery entitled The Ken & Barbie Killers: The Lost Tapes. It premiered on December 12, 2021, and consisted of 4 episodes.
