= Elizabeth George =

American mystery and thriller writer

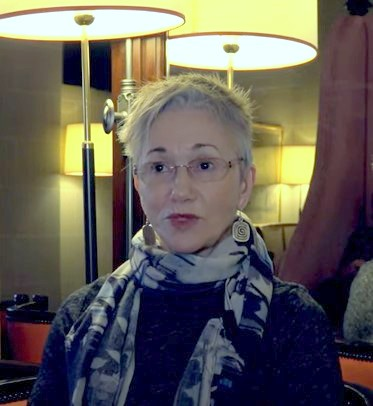
- George in 2019
- Born: Susan Elizabeth George; February 26, 1949 (age 77); Warren, Ohio, U.S.
- Education: Foothill Community College (A.A.); University of California, Riverside (B.A.); California State University, Fullerton (M.S.); University of California, Berkeley
- Occupation: Writer
- Spouse(s): Ira Jay Toibin (m. 1971; div. 1995) Thomas McCabe
- Writing career
- Genres: Mystery fiction, detective fiction
- Website: elizabethgeorgeonline.com

Susan Elizabeth George (born February 26, 1949) is an American writer of mystery novels.

She is the author of a series of novels featuring Inspector Thomas Lynley of London's Metropolitan Police. The 22nd book in the series was published in September 2025. The first 11 were adapted for television by the BBC as earlier episodes of The Inspector Lynley Mysteries (2001). A later separate four-part series entitled Lynley, shown on BritBox and BBC One, began filming in 2024, starring Leo Suter and Sofia Barclay.

== Early life ==
Elizabeth George was born in Warren, Ohio, the second child of Anne (née Rivelle) and Robert Edwin George. She has an older brother, author Robert Rivelle George. Her mother was a nurse and her father a manager for a conveyor company. The family moved to the San Francisco Bay Area when she was 18 months old. She recounts that her mother gave her an old Remington typewriter and she began writing at the age of 7. She said: "I have always felt compelled to write. When I began reading the Little Golden Books as a 7-year-old, I knew that I wanted to write one, too. I wrote tiny stories like that in the beginning." She has named Anne of Green Gables as one of the literary influences of her childhood.

She received an Associate of Arts in 1969 from Foothill Community College in Los Altos Hills, California, a Bachelor of Arts in 1970 from the University of California, Riverside, and a Master of Science in counseling and psychology in 1979 from the California State University, Fullerton, and later attended the University of California, Berkeley.

She received an honorary doctorate in humane letters from Cal State University Fullerton in 2004 and was awarded an honorary Masters in Fine Arts from the Northwest Institute of Literary Arts in 2010.

== Career ==
1975-1987 She taught English in high schools in Orange County, California (Mater Dei High School (Santa Ana, California), El Toro High School).

George wrote three crime novels before being accepted for publication.

1988-1990 She taught creative writing at colleges in Orange County, California (Coastline Community College, Irvine Valley College, University of California, Irvine). She then gave up teaching and became a full-time writer.

Her first published novel, A Great Deliverance (1988), introduces the upper-class Detective Inspector Thomas Lynley of Scotland Yard (in private life the Earl of Asherton) and his working-class partner, Detective Sergeant Barbara Havers. When asked in an interview why she chose to create a titled hero, she spoke of the freedom of being a debut novelist, saying: "I could do anything, you see, because when I started I never thought it would be published."

Since 1988 George has published 21 more Inspector Lynley mysteries, four young adult novels in the Whidbey Island series, three collections of short stories and two self-help books for writers. She names the author John Fowles as her main literary influence.

She established the Elizabeth George Foundation, a grant for unpublished and emerging writers, in 1997.

George has taught creative writing seminars in the US, Canada and the UK.

== Personal life ==
George married Ira Jay Toibin in 1971 and they divorced in 1995. In 2018 George was reported as being married to retired firefighter Tom McCabe. She has spoken of her struggle with depression, saying: "Happiness is an inside job – it takes a long time to learn that." She moved from Huntington Beach, California to Whidbey Island, Washington.

== Reception ==
George has spoken of being a great Anglophile since her first visit to Britain in 1966, and of watching UK TV shows and reading books by UK novelists to "pick up the syntax of British speech." She has been praised for the authenticity of her portrayal of "the nuances, class system, language, humour and habits of the British," although not all critics have been in agreement. The Times crime critic Marcel Berlins has described her as "an exasperating writer, (who) insists on perpetuating a police procedure that hasn’t existed for decades, is not good on social mores and her dialogue often reveals a tin ear." Critics have commented adversely on the length and complexity of her novels while acknowledging the satisfying nature of the read.

== Awards ==
- 1988 - Agatha Award for Best First Novel, for A Great Deliverance (Winner)
- 1988 - Edgar Award (Nominated).
- 1989 - Anthony Award for Best Debut Novel
- 1990 - Grand Prix de Littérature Policière (France) for A Great Deliverance.

== Works ==
=== Inspector Lynley ===
- 1988: A Great Deliverance (ISBN 9780553278026)
- 1989: Payment in Blood (ISBN 9780553284362)
- 1990: Well-Schooled in Murder (ISBN 9780553287349)
- 1991: A Suitable Vengeance (ISBN 9780553295603)
- 1992: For the Sake of Elena (ISBN 9780553561272)
- 1992: Missing Joseph (ISBN 9780553566048)
- 1993: Playing for the Ashes (ISBN 9780553092622)
- 1996: In the Presence of the Enemy (ISBN 9780553092653)
- 1997: Deception on His Mind (ISBN 9780553102345)
- 1999: In Pursuit of the Proper Sinner (ISBN 9780553102352)
- 2001: A Traitor to Memory (ISBN 9780553801279)
- 2003: A Place of Hiding (ISBN 9780553801309)
- 2005: With No One as Witness (ISBN 9780060798451)
- 2006: What Came Before He Shot Her (ISBN 9780060545628)
- 2008: Careless in Red (ISBN 9780061160875)
- 2010: This Body of Death (ISBN 9780061160882)
- 2012: Believing the Lie (ISBN 9780525952589)
- 2013: Just One Evil Act (ISBN 9781444706000)
- 2015: A Banquet of Consequences (ISBN 9780525954330)
- 2018: The Punishment She Deserves (ISBN 978-1444786613)
- 2022: Something to Hide (ISBN 9780593296844)
- 2025: A Slowly Dying Cause (ISBN 9780593493588)

=== Whidbey Island Saga ===
- 2012: The Edge of Nowhere (The Edge of Nowhere: Saratoga Woods or The Edge of Nowhere 01: The Dog House) (ISBN 9781444719956)
- 2013: The Edge of the Water (The Edge of the Water: Saratoga Woods) (ISBN 9780670012978)
- 2015: The Edge of the Shadows (ISBN 9780670012985)
- 2016: The Edge of the Light (ISBN 9780670012992)

=== Short story collections ===
- 2001: The Evidence Exposed (ISBN 9780340750636; Short story collection UK)
- 2002: I, Richard (ISBN 9780553802580; short story collection)
- 2004: A Moment on the Edge: 100 Years of Crime Stories by Women (editor; ISBN 978-0-06-058821-2)

=== Nonfiction ===
- 2004: Write Away (ISBN 9780060560423)
- 2020: Mastering the Process: From Idea to Novel
