= Payment in Blood =

1989 novel by Elizabeth George

- First edition (US)
- Author: Elizabeth George
- Series: Inspector Lynley
- Genre: Crime novel
- Publisher: Bantam Books
- Publication date: 1989
- Publication place: United States
- Media type: Print (hardcover, paperback)
- ISBN: 9780553284362 (first)
- Preceded by: A Great Deliverance
- Followed by: Well-Schooled in Murder

Payment in Blood is the second crime novel by Elizabeth George. Like its predecessor, A Great Deliverance (1988), it features Inspector Lynley and Barbara Havers of Scotland Yard as they investigate a murder. On this occasion, the Inspector comes into conflict with the principles of the English upper class, of which he himself is a member.

== Plot ==
When Joy Sinclair, a noted and controversial playwright, is found stabbed to death in a locked room at a remote estate in the Scottish Highlands, Inspector Lynley and his irascible partner, Havers, are called to investigate. The situation is further complicated by the list of high-profile suspects, which include a leading actress, a famous theatre producer, a director and Lady Helen Clyde, Lynley's old friend, with whom the Inspector is in love.

== Reception ==
The novel was generally well-received, being described by Kirkus Reviews as: "Not quite as dazzling as its predecessor ... but still complex, rich, and accomplished enough to elbow the author between P.D. James and Ruth Rendell to form the new triumvirate of English psychological suspense."

A German translation by Mechtild Sandberg-Ciletti was published first by Blanvalet in 1991 under the title Keiner werfe den ersten Stein. It was subsequently also published in paperback form by Goldmann.
