= Common people (disambiguation) =

Common people are ordinary people lacking significant social status.

It may also refer to:

- Common People, a song by the Pulp
- Common People (Black Mirror), a TV series episode
