= A Suitable Vengeance =

1991 novel by Elizabeth George

- First US edition
- Author: Elizabeth George
- Series: Inspector Lynley
- Genre: Crime novel
- Publisher: Bantam Books
- Publication date: 1991
- Publication place: United States
- Media type: Print (hardcover, paperback)
- ISBN: 9780553295603 (first)
- Preceded by: Well-Schooled in Murder
- Followed by: For the Sake of Elena

A Suitable Vengeance is a crime novel by Elizabeth George. Published by Bantam Books in 1991, it is the author's fourth novel to feature Inspector Lynley.

It also exists as an audiobook, narrated by Donada Peters.

== Plot ==
A Suitable Vengeance is set a few years before the first Inspector Lynley novel, and offers some insights into his later relationships. The story starts with Lynley escorting his fiancée Deborah to meet his family at their Cornwall estate. Also present are his old friends Simon and Lady Helen, along with his addict brother Peter; Simon's younger sister Sidney and her partner, biochemist Justin Brooke; and Deborah's father, who serves as valet to Simon. The reunion is somewhat fraught: Sidney is being brutalized by Justin; Lynley and his mother have been estranged for over a decade; Simon is secretly in love with Deborah; and Lynley has to engage awkwardly with his mother's lover, Dr. Roderick Trenarrow.

To add to this, two murders are committed; a newsman, and Sidney's lover, Brooke, who has been researching a new drug, Incomet. There are several possible suspects, including Lynley's brother Peter, Dr. Trenarrow, and the Lynley estate manager, and Lynley is obliged to investigate, even as suspicion falls on members of his own family and friendship group.

== Reception ==
The novel was generally well-received, with some caveats: The New York Times commented on the psychological insights into the characters; Kirkus Reviews praised its depiction of emotional relationships but also criticized it as "overwrought", while Publishers Weekly called it a "darkly vibrant modern English mystery."
