= Jeremy Pope =

American actor and singer

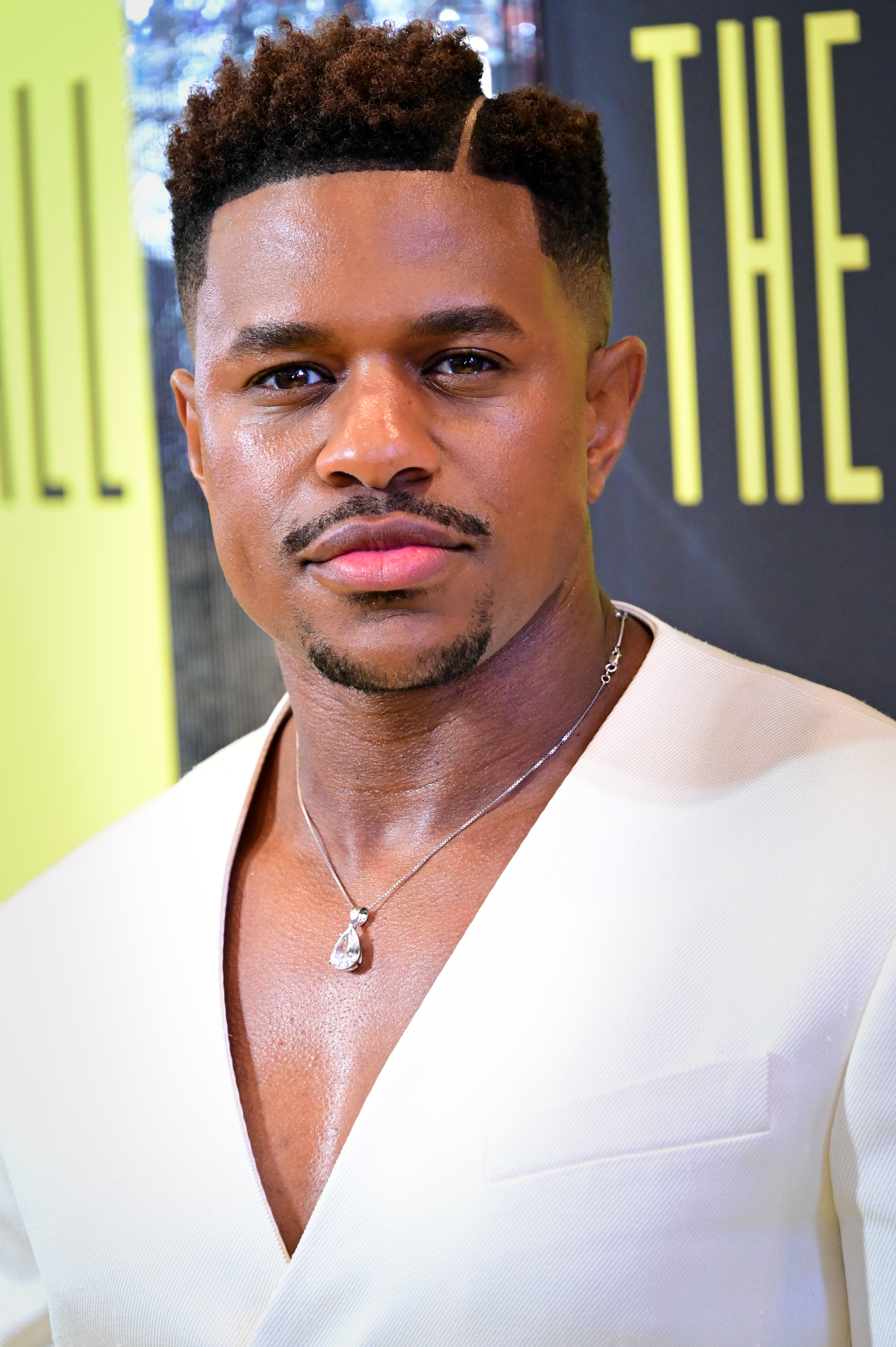
- Pope in 2026
- Born: July 9, 1992 (age 34); Orlando, Florida, U.S.
- Occupations: Actor; singer
- Years active: 2013–present

Jeremy Pope (born July 9, 1992) is an American actor and singer. Pope is the sixth person in Tony Award history to be nominated in two categories for separate performances during the same year, having received nominations for Best Actor in a Leading Role in a Play for his role as Pharus Jonathan Young in Choir Boy and Best Actor in a Featured Role in a Musical for his role as Eddie Kendricks in Ain't Too Proud, the latter of which also earned him a nomination for the Grammy Award for Best Musical Theater Album.

In 2020, Pope starred in the Netflix miniseries Hollywood, which earned him a nomination for a 2020 Primetime Emmy Award for Outstanding Actor in a Leading Role in a Limited or Anthology Series or Movie. In 2023, he received a Golden Globe nomination for his performance in the film The Inspection.

== Life and acting career ==
A native of Orlando, Florida, Pope attended Timber Creek High School and the American Musical and Dramatic Academy. He made his Broadway debut in 2018 as Pharus Jonathan Young in the play Choir Boy, soon followed by a role as Eddie Kendricks in the jukebox musical Ain't Too Proud. In 2019, he became the sixth actor in Tony Award history to be nominated in two categories during the same year, garnering nominations for Best Actor in a Leading Role in a Play for his role as Pharus Jonathan Young in Choir Boy and for Best Actor in a Featured Role in a Musical for his role as Eddie Kendricks in Ain't Too Proud. In 2019, he landed a lead role in Ryan Murphy's new Netflix series Hollywood, for which he was nominated for the Primetime Emmy Award for Outstanding Lead Actor in a Limited Series or Movie. In 2021, he also had a main role as Christopher, Blanca's boyfriend in the third and final season of Murphy's TV series Pose. In 2022, Pope returned to the theater, starring as painter Jean-Michel Basquiat opposite Paul Bettany as pop artist Andy Warhol in The Collaboration.

That same year, Pope starred in Elegance Bratton's semi-autobiographical film The Inspection as Ellis French, a young man who enlists in the United States Marine Corps. His performance earned him a nomination for the Golden Globe Award for Best Actor in a Motion Picture – Drama.

In 2024, Pope expanded his work as a filmmaker with the short film God Is Good, which he wrote and starred in and was directed by C Prinz. The film incorporates music, monologue, and dance and explores themes of faith, identity, masculinity, and self-acceptance. God Is Good was acquired by The Criterion Collection for streaming on the Criterion Channel.

In 2026, Pope starred as Jeremy in the FX television series The Beauty, created by Ryan Murphy and Matthew Hodgson, and also served as an executive producer on the series. He also made his Broadway producing debut as a co-producer of Cats: The Jellicle Ball. The production received nine Tony Award nominations, including Best Revival of a Musical, for which Pope was among the nominated producers, and won three awards.

== Personal life ==
Pope was born and raised in Orlando, Florida, in a close-knit family and religious household. His father, a pastor and professional bodybuilder, was an early influence on Pope's understanding of faith, discipline, and masculinity. Pope grew up singing in church and has described his upbringing and family as formative influences on his development as an artist.

Pope has spoken about navigating the expectations of the church while developing his own understanding of faith, sexuality, masculinity, and self-expression. He has described these experiences, as well as growing up as a Black man in the American South, as influences on his personal and artistic development.

Pope has also spoken about the personal significance of portraying Pharus Jonathan Young in Choir Boy, which he first began performing early in his career, and how his experiences with identity and self-acceptance have informed his work.

== Acting credits ==
=== Theatre ===
Year	Title	Role	Venue	Notes
2013	Choir Boy	Pharus Jonathan Young	New York City Center	Off-Broadway
2014	Choir Boy	Pharus Jonathan Young	Alliance Theatre	Regional
2014	Choir Boy	Pharus Jonathan Young	Geffen Playhouse	Regional
2015	Invisible Thread	Griffin	Second Stage Theater	Off-Broadway
2017	The View UpStairs	Wes	Lynn Redgrave Theater	Off-Broadway
2017	Ain't Too Proud	Eddie Kendricks	Berkeley Repertory Theatre	Regional
2017–18	Ain't Too Proud	Eddie Kendricks	The Kennedy Center	Regional
2017–18	Ain't Too Proud	Eddie Kendricks	Ahmanson Theatre	Regional
2017–18	Ain't Too Proud	Eddie Kendricks	Princess of Wales Theatre	Toronto
2018–19	Choir Boy	Pharus Jonathan Young	Samuel J. Friedman Theatre	Broadway
2019	Ain't Too Proud	Eddie Kendricks	Imperial Theatre	Broadway
2022	The Collaboration	Jean-Michel Basquiat	The Young Vic	London stage debut
2022–23	The Collaboration	Jean-Michel Basquiat	Samuel J. Friedman Theatre	Broadway

=== Film ===
Year	Title	Role	Notes
2018	The Ranger	Jerk	
2020	One Night in Miami	Jackie Wilson	
2022	The Inspection	Ellis French	
2024	God is Good	Himself	Short film Also writer
TBA	The Collaboration	Jean-Michel Basquiat	Post-production

=== Television ===
Year	Title	Role	Notes
2020	Hollywood	Archie Coleman	Main role
2021	Pose	Christopher	Main role
2026	The Beauty	Jeremy	Main role

== Fashion ==
In addition to his work in film, television, theater, music and photography, Pope has maintained a presence in the fashion industry through runway appearances, advertising campaigns and collaborations with luxury fashion houses.

Pope made his runway debut in November 2021, walking in Gucci's Love Parade show on Hollywood Boulevard, designed by Alessandro Michele. Later that year, Pope appeared in Rihanna's Savage X Fenty Show Vol. 3.

In 2024, Pope was named a global menswear ambassador for Italian luxury fashion house Fendi, appearing in the brand's worldwide Spring/Summer 2024 men's advertising campaign. Photographed by Bruno Staub, the campaign was shot in Florence on a set inspired by the Fendi Factory in Capannuccia.

That same year, Pope starred in Calvin Klein's 2024 Pride underwear campaign. GQ described Pope as the face of the campaign, which was photographed and directed by Gordon von Steiner.

Pope has also appeared in Vogue World for three consecutive years. He participated in Vogue World: Paris in 2024, appearing in the Jean Paul Gaultier segment alongside Maluma and FKA Twigs. He returned for Vogue World: Hollywood in 2025, appearing in the show's Afrofuturism section wearing Off-White. In 2026, he participated in Vogue World: Milano wearing Dolce & Gabbana, marking his third consecutive appearance in the event.

In June 2026, Pope appeared on the cover of GQ Germany for its Pride Month issue, accompanied by a fashion editorial featuring looks from Gucci's Pre-Fall 2026 collection.

Pope has been a recurring attendee of the Met Gala. At the 2023 gala, honoring Karl Lagerfeld, he wore a custom Balmain ensemble designed by Olivier Rousteing, featuring a nearly 33-foot train bearing a large-scale portrait of Lagerfeld. The garment was described as one of the longest trains in Met Gala history, with its construction requiring over 5,000 meters of silk chiffon and the work of 70 seamstresses. Vogue subsequently included Pope among its best-dressed men of the 2023 gala.

For his seventh Met Gala appearance in 2026, Pope and stylist Law Roach selected Slave to Love, an archival beaded and corseted evening jacket from Vivienne Westwood's Fall 1996 menswear collection. The trompe-l'œil garment depicts a muscular torso in pearl beading on its front and red lacerations on its back; its companion piece, Martyr to Love, was included in the Metropolitan Museum of Art Costume Institute's Costume Art exhibition. GQ ranked Pope first on its list of the 12 best-dressed men at the 2026 Met Gala. The look was also included in Vogue's retrospective, The 127 Best Met Gala Looks of All Time, recognizing it among the event's most memorable fashion moments.

== Music ==
Pope is a singer, songwriter, and multidisciplinary artist whose work spans music, acting, photography, and filmmaking. Raised in Orlando, Florida, he began singing in church and writing and recording music as a teenager.

Pope independently released his debut EP, Last Name: Pope, in 2024. The project incorporates elements of R&B, soul, funk, gospel, and house music and explores themes including identity, faith, sexuality, masculinity, love, and self-discovery.

The EP includes the single "Worth a Million", which explores themes of identity, vulnerability, and self-worth. Pope also released "Uptown Apartment", a funk-influenced collaboration featuring Earth, Wind & Fire bassist Verdine White.

Pope's music has also intersected with his work as a filmmaker and visual artist. He wrote and starred in the autobiographical short film God Is Good, directed by C Prinz. The film explores themes of Blackness, queerness, Christianity, gender, and self-acceptance. In 2024, the film was acquired by The Criterion Collection for streaming on the Criterion Channel.

Pope is also a principal soloist on the Broadway cast recordings of The View UpStairs and Ain't Too Proud: The Life and Times of the Temptations. His work on the latter earned him a nomination for the Grammy Award for Best Musical Theater Album in 2020.

=== Visual art and photography ===
Pope is also a photographer and visual artist, working primarily in portraiture, self-portraiture, and photojournalism. His work frequently explores family, Black identity, masculinity, sexuality, spirituality, and memory.

Pope began photographing professionally while studying acting in New York, initially taking headshots for fellow students before photographing actors and models and working with casting and modeling agencies. He later expanded his practice into conceptual photography, styling, and creative direction.

In 2021, Pope photographed, styled, and creative-directed Generations, an intimate family photo essay featuring his father, Ty Pope, and grandfather, Nathaniel Pope, photographed in Florida and dressed in Gucci. Primarily shot in black and white, the series explored Black masculinity, fatherhood, family lineage, and Pope's relationship to the men who raised him.

Pope continued the family portrait series in 2022 with a collection centered on his grandmother, Ann Hardison. Photographed at her home in Florida, the portraits explored their relationship as well as Hardison's influence on Pope's sense of style and artistic identity. W described Pope as an "actor, photographer, and fashion star" in its coverage of the series.

In 2023, Pope debuted FLEX(bitch), a photojournalism series examining masculinity, self-love, sexuality, and internalized homophobia. Drawing partly from his upbringing as the son of a pastor and professional bodybuilder, the series incorporated portraiture, self-portraiture, archival imagery, and photographs of family members, and featured RuPaul's Drag Race winner Symone.

FLEX(bitch) was presented at the SCOPE Art Show in Miami Beach during Miami Art Week in December 2023. As part of the presentation, Pope participated in a public conversation with playwright and Oscar Winning screenwriter Tarell Alvin McCraney about the themes and development of the work.

=== Discography ===
==== Extended plays ====
Title	EP details	Track listing
Last Name: Pope	Released: June 21, 2024; Label: Independent; Format: Digital download, streaming	"U, Lost"; "What I Gotta Do"; "Want, U"; "City2City"; "Fine"; "U, Lost (Prom Edition)"

==== Singles ====
Title	Year
"Wait For You"	2015
"New Love"	2018
"Feel So Good"	2018
"Be Great" – Loladre (Laura Dreyfuss) (featuring Jeremy Pope)	2019
"Time After Time" (Cyndi Lauper cover)	2020
"September" (Earth, Wind & Fire cover)	2020
"Ain't Nobody"	2021
"Worth a Million"	2021
"Uptown Apartment" (featuring Verdine White)	2022
"U, Lost / What I Gotta Do"	2024
"Fine"	2024

== Accolades ==
Year	Award	Category	Work	Result	Ref.
2013	Drama League Award	Distinguished Performance	Choir Boy	Nominated	
2019	Outer Critics Circle Award	Outstanding Actor in a Leading Role in a Play	Choir Boy	Nominated	
2019	Theatre World Award	Outstanding Debut Performance	Choir Boy	Won	
2019	Tony Award	Best Actor in a Leading Role in a Play	Choir Boy	Nominated	
2019	Tony Award	Best Actor in a Featured Role in a Musical	Ain't Too Proud	Nominated	
2019	Drama League Award	Distinguished Performance Award	Ain't Too Proud	Nominated	
2020	Grammy Award	Best Musical Theater Album	Ain't Too Proud	Nominated	
2020	Primetime Emmy Award	Outstanding Lead Actor in a Limited Series or Movie	Hollywood	Nominated	
2020	African-American Film Critics Association	Breakthrough Performer	Hollywood	Won	
2022	African-American Film Critics Association	Best Actor	The Inspection	Won	
2023	Alliance of Women Film Journalists	Best Actor	The Inspection	Nominated	
2023	Black Reel Awards	Outstanding Actor	The Inspection	Won	
2023	Black Reel Awards	Outstanding Breakthrough Performance, Male	The Inspection	Won	
2023	Golden Globe Award	Best Actor – Motion Picture Drama	The Inspection	Nominated	
2023	Independent Spirit Awards	Best Lead Performance	The Inspection	Nominated	
2023	Santa Barbara International Film Festival	Virtuosos Award	The Inspection	Won	
2026	Tony Awards	Best Revival of a Musical	Cats: The Jellicle Ball	Nominated	

In June 2020, in honor of the 50th anniversary of the first LGBTQ Pride parade, Queerty named him among the fifty heroes "leading the nation toward equality, acceptance, and dignity for all people".

== See also ==
- African-American Tony nominees and winners
- List of Tony Award records
- LGBT culture in New York City
