= Sofia Barclay =

English actress

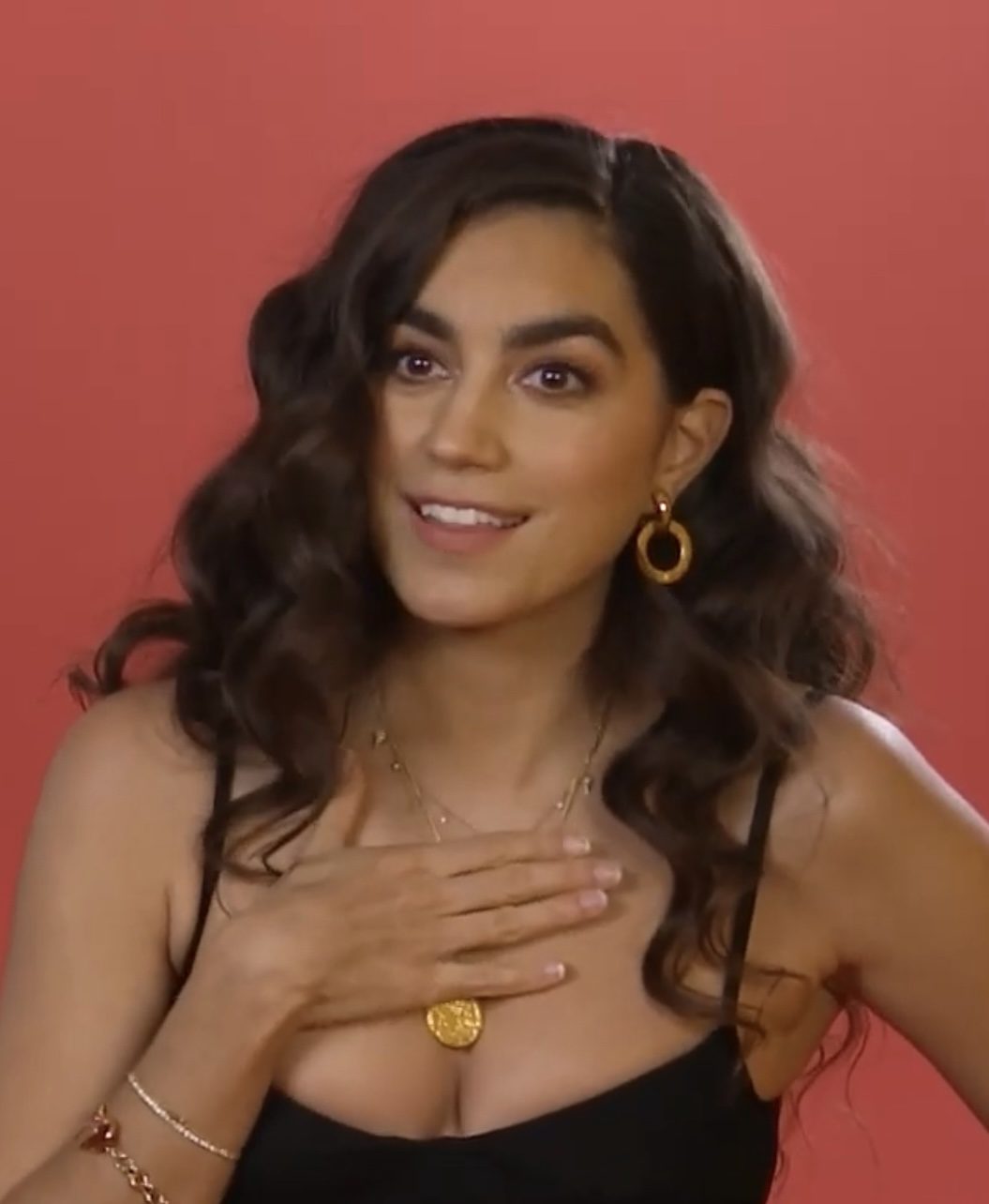
- Barclay at the British Independent Film Awards 2021
- Born: Sofia Beatrice Barclay; London, England
- Other name: Sofia Stuart
- Years active: 2010–present
- Family: David Barclay (paternal grandfather)

Sofia Beatrice Barclay, also credited as Sofia Stuart, is an English actress, who has performed on stage and TV, and in film. She began her professional career in 2010 after attending theatre school in New York. Her films include Love Again and the animation Spider-Man: Across the Spider-Verse (both 2023). On television, she stars in the BBC One crime drama Lynley (2025).

== Early life and education ==
Sofia Barclay, of British and Indian descent, was born in central London. She has an elder sister, Jenna Zoe, and a younger brother, Andrew. Their parents are Aidan Barclay, former chairperson of the Telegraph Media Group, and his wife Ferzana ("Fizzy"). Their paternal grandfather is the late billionaire Sir David Barclay.

Barclay attended Francis Holland School on Graham Terrace, and Westminster School for sixth form. She later took classes at the Circle in the Square Theatre School in New York City, performing in the school's 2009 showcase. At one point, Barclay and her brother were the registered co-owners of the building housing The Spectator, one of their family's holdings.

== Career ==
Initially credited as Sofia Stuart, Barclay began her career with a made-for-television film, Witchville. She pursued a range of theatrical opportunities across the UK, including fringe theatre in London and Edinburgh, Shakespeare in pub-theatres, and plays for children at the Soho Theatre. She played Desdemona in the 2012 Jack Studio Brockley production of Othello, receiving critical acclaim for her performance. She went on the 2014 tour with The Two Worlds of Charlie F and had further theatre roles as Anna in Future Conditional at the Old Vic in 2015 and Nathalie in Mosquitoes at the National Theatre in 2017.

In 2018 and 2019, Barclay played Selina in the BBC Two legal sitcom Defending the Guilty and Alisha in the Hampstead Theatre production of Everyday I Make Greatness Happen, had a small role in the film In Darkness, and was cast as Adela Zal in a pilot for a potential NYPD Blue spin-off series on ABC. Barclay had recurring roles as Zarina in the 2021 Channel 4 sitcom We Are Lady Parts and Dr. O'Sullivan, Roy Kent's (Brett Goldstein) sister, in the second and third seasons of the Apple TV+ sports comedy Ted Lasso. She originated the role of Maya in The Collaboration at the Young Vic in 2022.

Her film work includes credits spanning psychological thriller, drama, and romantic comedy. She appeared in Julian Jarrold's Sulphur and White and featured in the romantic comedy Love Again alongside Priyanka Chopra. Notably, Barclay voiced Malala Windsor/Spider-UK in the Marvel animated blockbuster Spider-Man: Across the Spider-Verse.

In July 2024, it was announced Barclay would star in a Lynley revival for BritBox and BBC One, playing Detective Sergeant Barbara Havers, with Leo Suter as Detective Inspector Thomas Lynley. The four-episode first series was streamed on BritBox in 2025, and aired on BBC One in 2026. Also, in 2025, Barclay played Safiya Zamil, a guest role in the Apple TV+ thriller Prime Target. In 2026, Barclay was noted as filming a second season of Lynley in Ireland.

== Filmography ==
=== Film ===
Year	Title	Role	Notes
2014	Avenue to Nowhere	Bar Patron	Short films (Credited as Sophia Stuart)
2014	Bistro Caprice	Mélanie	Short films (Credited as Sophia Stuart)
2018	In Darkness	WPC 2	Uncredited role
2019	Misconduct	Melissa	Short film
2020	Sulphur and White	Divina	
2023	Love Again	Suzy Ray	
2023	Spider-Man: Across the Spider-Verse	Malala Windsor / Spider-UK	Voice role
2024	O.C.D. (Obsessor Coercio Deus)	Liberal Panelist	Short film

=== Television ===
Year	Title	Role	Notes
2010	Witchville	Witch	Television film
2018	Beyond the Blade	The Doctor	Mini-series; episode 4: "The Doctor"
2018–2019	Defending the Guilty	Selina	3 episodes
2019	NYPD Blue	Adela Zal	Television film (Pilot)
2021	We Are Lady Parts	Zarina	2 episodes: "Godzilla" and "Represent"
2021–2023	Ted Lasso	Dr. O'Sullivan	2 episodes: "Man City" and "International Break"
2025	Prime Target	Safiya Zamil	2 episodes: "The Sequence" and "Kaplar"
2025	Lynley	DS Barbara Havers	4 episodes

== Stage ==
Year	Title	Role	Notes
2012	Othello	Desmonda	Jack Studio Theatre, Brockley
2014	The Two Worlds of Charlie F	Lauren	UK tour
2015	Future Conditional	Anna	Old Vic, London
2017	Mosquitoes	Nathalie	National Theatre, London
2018	Everyday I Make Greatness Happen	Alisha	Hampstead Theatre, London
2022	The Collaboration	Maya	Young Vic, London
