= Missing Joseph =

1992 novel by Elizabeth George

- First US edition
- Author: Elizabeth George
- Series: Inspector Lynley
- Genre: Crime novel
- Publisher: Bantam Books
- Publication date: 1992
- Publication place: United States
- Media type: Print (hardcover, paperback)
- ISBN: 9780553566048 (first)
- Preceded by: For the Sake of Elena
- Followed by: Playing for the Ashes

Missing Joseph is a 1993 crime novel by Elizabeth George, the sixth featuring Inspector Lynley, first published by Bantam Books.

Deborah and Simon St James take a winter break to Lancashire to ease their troubled marriage, but when the vicar seems to die of accidental poisoning, following a meal with the herbalist, Simon expresses doubts over the efficiency of the investigation, and Inspector Lynley is called in to investigate.

== Plot ==
In Missing Joseph, Lynley's friend Simon Allcourt St. James and his wife Deborah are on holiday in the village of Winslough, hoping to find solace from the miscarriages that have put their marriage under severe stress. However, they arrive to find that the vicar, Robin Sage, with whom Deborah has dealt in the past, is dead, from what seems to be accidental poisoning.

The investigation by local constable Colin Shepherd has ruled the poisoning accidental: Sage's dinner host, local herbalist Juliet Spence, having mistaken water hemlock for wild parsnip. However, as Shepherd is Juliet's lover, this seems suspicious to Simon, who calls in Lynley of New Scotland Yard to reopen the case. Lynley discovers buried secrets and past scandals in the Lancashire village, including the fact that the victim had an infant son who died of SIDS and a wife who apparently took her own life. As it becomes increasingly clear that the poisoning of Robin Sage was not an accident, the narrative looks at the tortuous nature of human relationships, and the lengths to which a mother will go for the sake of her child.

== Reception ==
The book received mediocre reviews, with critics commenting adversely on the wordiness of the dialogue, and the fact that Lynley and Havers take a lesser role than expected in the plot. Kirkus Reviews criticizes the "polarized characters too often engaged in lengthy, numbing speechifying", although Publishers Weekly calls it "a...deftly plotted, highly atmospheric novel."
