= For the Sake of Elena =

1992 novel by Elizabeth George

- First US edition
- Author: Elizabeth George
- Series: Inspector Lynley
- Genre: Crime novel
- Publisher: Bantam Books
- Publication date: 1992
- Publication place: United States
- Media type: Print (hardcover, paperback)
- ISBN: 9780553561272 (first)
- Preceded by: A Suitable Vengeance
- Followed by: Missing Joseph

For the Sake of Elena is a crime novel by Elizabeth George,. the fifth in her Inspector Lynley series. It was first published in 1992 by Bantam Books and was the fifth of her books adapted for UK television in 2002.

Set in the fictional St Stephen's College, Cambridge, the story follows Lynley and Havers as they are called to investigate the murder of Elena Weaver, a deaf student and the daughter of respected history professor Anthony Weaver, found battered to death as she went for her morning run. Further investigation reveals that Elena was pregnant when she died, and that she led a promiscuous lifestyle at odds with her father's impression of her.

== Reception ==
The book was moderately well-received, with Publishers Weekly commenting adversely on certain farfetched elements of the plot, but calling it "a well-crafted mystery." Kirkus Reviews commented on its length and the "tedious" aspects of certain relationships, calling it "uneven and puffy", but acknowledged that it was an absorbing read despite these qualities.
