= Playing for the Ashes =

1993 novel by Elizabeth George

- First UK edition
- Author: Elizabeth George
- Series: Inspector Lynley
- Genre: Crime novel
- Publisher: Bantam Books
- Publication date: 1993
- Publication place: United States
- Media type: Print (hardcover, paperback)
- ISBN: 9780553092622 (first)
- Preceded by: Missing Joseph
- Followed by: In the Presence of the Enemy

Playing for the Ashes is a crime novel by Elizabeth George, published in 1993 by Bantam Books. It is the author's seventh crime novel featuring Inspector Lynley. It also exists as an audiobook, narrated by Donada Peters.

== Background ==
The title Playing for the Ashes refers to a British cricketing term.

== Plot ==
When a famous cricketing star, Kenneth Fleming, is found dead on the estate of his patron, Lynley and Havers investigate with the help of local Detective Inspector Isabelle Ardery. Fleming, who was just going through divorce proceedings at the time of his death, was about to set off on holiday to Greece with his son. He is discovered following a fire in the cottage in which he was staying, although the woman who was meant to be renting it is nowhere to be found. Lynley's investigation leads him to seek out Fleming's patron’s daughter, Olivia, who suffers from ALS, and is now living on a barge with her animal-rights-activist partner. The plot follows a number of complicated personal and professional relationships, including those of Olivia' desperate need to gain the approval of her estranged mother.

== Reception ==
The novel received wide coverage, but mixed reviews. Critics commented on the length and detail of the book, whilst praising George's literary skills. Publishers Weekly said: "Although George's fluent prose is in full gear, the story fails to sustain momentum, sinking under the combined weight of superfluous detail and an overreaching psychological tone." Kirkus Reviews says: "Rambling and effusively wordy, Playing For the Ashes holds the reader in thrall to the end — a tribute to George's literary skills and storytelling magic."
