= Believing the Lie =

2012 novel by Elizabeth George

Believing The Lie
- First US edition
- Author: Elizabeth George
- Series: Inspector Lynley
- Genre: Crime novel
- Publisher: Dutton (US); Hodder & Stoughton (UK)
- Publication date: 2012
- Publication place: United States
- Media type: Print (hardcover, paperback)
- ISBN: 9780525952589 (first)
- Preceded by: This Body of Death
- Followed by: Just One Evil Act

Believing The Lie is a crime novel by Elizabeth George. It reached third place on the 2012 best sellers list of The New York Times.

== Plot ==
Inspector Thomas Lynley is sent undercover to investigate a death that has been ruled an accidental drowning. With the help of Simon and Deborah St. James, he soon discovers a web of intrigue, secrets and lies.

== Reception ==
The novel received mixed reviews, with critics commenting on the novel's length and the complexity of the plot. The New York Review of Books said: ''There may be a good 200-page book here, but it needs a solid plot point of view and a talented editor to dig it out.''

Publishers Weekly commented negatively on what it called "statements of the obvious" and "platitudes".

Kirkus Reviews described it as: ''Pared-down George, weighing in at a svelte 600 pages, but still strewn with subplots, melodrama, melancholy, a wretchedly unhappy Havers and the impossibly heroic, impossibly nice Thomas Lynley.''
