= Michael Workéyè =

British actor (born 1996)

- Born: August 1996 (age 30); London, United Kingdom
- Education: ArtsEd (BA)
- Years active: 2019–present

Michael Workéyè (born August 1996) is a British actor. On television, he appeared in the BBC One series This is Going to Hurt (2022) and the Amazon Prime series My Lady Jane (2024).

== Early life ==
Workeye was born in central London. He graduated from the Arts Educational Schools (ArtsEd) in 2019 with a Bachelor of Arts (BA) in Acting.

== Career ==
Workeye made his television debut in the BBC One film Sitting in Limbo. He went on the England tour of the play Drip Drip Drip. He was cast as a lead in Bolu Babalola's pilot for Channel 4 titled Big Age. He also signed with Select Model Management.

In 2022, Workeye had his first recurring role as hospital worker Ben in the BBC One miniseries This is Going to Hurt, made his feature film debut in the thriller Into the Deep, and starred in House of Ife, a play about an Ethiopian-British family, at the Bush Theatre. For his performance in the latter, Workeye received nominations for the 2022 The Stage Debut Awards and 2023 The Offies.

Workeye had a major supporting role as Archer in the 2024 Amazon Prime alternate history fantasy series My Lady Jane. He also appeared on stage in Phoebe Eclair-Powell's Shed at the Royal Exchange, Manchester. The following year, Workeye played Kae in the Black Mirror series 7 episode "Bête Noire" and Kaleb Negasi in the Disney+ mystery series The Stolen Girl. He will also appear in the Lynley revival on BBC One and play Billy in the U&Alibi series Bookish. He has an upcoming role in the Apple TV+ adaptation of Margo's Got Money Troubles.

== Filmography ==
=== Film ===
Year	Title	Role	Notes
2019	Mother Earth	Lukas	Short film
2020	Sauce	Man	Short film
2020	Brothers	Mickey	Short film
2022	Lions	Man	Short film
2022	Into the Deep	Mike	
2026	The Moment	Josh	
TBA	Rogue Trooper †	Private Herzog	Post-production

=== Television ===
Year	Title	Role	Notes
2020	Sitting in Limbo	Ahmed	Television film
2021	Big Age	Zeke	Pilot
2022	This is Going to Hurt	Ben	6 episodes
2024	My Lady Jane	Archer	4 episodes
2025	Black Mirror	Kae	Episode: "Bête Noire"
2025	The Stolen Girl	Kaleb Negasi	5 episodes
2025	Bookish	Billy	2 episodes
2025	The Girlfriend	Jamal K	Episode #1.5
2025	Lynley	DS Tony Bekele	4 episodes
2026	Margo's Got Money Troubles	JB	
2026	Break Clause	Kas	4 episodes

== Stage ==
Year	Title	Role	Notes
2020	Drip Drip Drip	Daniel Mebrahtu	England tour
2022	House of Ife	Yosi	Bush Theatre, London
2024	Shed	Mark	Royal Exchange, Manchester
2025	Paldem	Kevin	Edinburgh Fringe Festival

== Awards and nominations ==
Year	Award	Category	Work	Result	Ref.
2022	The Stage Debut Awards	Best Performer in a Play	House of Ife	Nominated	
2023	Offie	Newcomer	House of Ife	Nominated	
