= Deception on His Mind =

1997 mystery novel by Elizabeth George

Deception on his Mind
- Author: Elizabeth George
- Series: Inspector Lynley
- Genre: Crime novel
- Publisher: Bantam Books
- Publication date: 1997
- Publication place: United States
- Media type: Print (hardcover, paperback)
- ISBN: 9780553102345 (first)
- Preceded by: In the Presence of the Enemy
- Followed by: In Pursuit of the Proper Sinner

Deception on his Mind is a 1997 mystery novel by US author Elizabeth George. It is the ninth novel in George's Inspector Lynley series, and follows directly from the events of the previous novel, In the Presence of the Enemy.

Inspector Lynley is on his honeymoon, and the novel centres largely on DS Barbara Havers, who, left to her own devices in Lynley's absence, is called to investigate the murder of a Pakistani man in the sleepy Essex seaside town of Balford-le-Nez. The murder seems racially motivated, but very soon, other motives and secrets within the community come to light.

== Plot ==
Deception on his Mind takes place two weeks after the events of In the Presence of the Enemy. Lynley has married his long-time lover Lady Helen, and is away on honeymoon, leaving his partner Havers to recover from injuries sustained during the previous case. During this enforced leave of absence, Havers follows her neighbours, Taymullah Azhar and his young daughter, Hadiyyah, to Balford-le-Nez on the Essex coast, where a family situation has summoned them. They arrive in Balford to find unrest and rioting, triggered by the recent murder of a wealthy Pakistani immigrant. Chief Detective Inspector Emily Barlow asks Havers to help investigate the crime. It soon transpires that the murdered man, Haytham Querashi, was engaged to a young relative of Azhar's, and the case uncovers a complicated series of relationships and possible motives. Havers finds it increasingly difficult to work with the ambitious, racially prejudiced Barlow, and finds herself risking her career to uncover the culprit.

== Themes ==
The novel deals with themes of racial prejudice and sexuality, as well as "love, jealousy, sexuality, religion, greed."

== Reception ==
The novel was generally well-received: Publishers Weekly gave it a starred review, commenting adversely on its length but praising the characterization and calling it: "an unusually elaborate and intricate mystery." The New York Times calls it "melodrama," but acknowledges the quality of the storytelling, though Kirkus Reviews criticizes the novel's "pretension" and lack of finesse, saying: "A vital issue is badly served by moralizing, predictable characterizing."
