= Christmas Karma =

British Christmas musical film

- Theatrical release poster
- Directed by: Gurinder Chadha
- Written by: Gurinder Chadha
- Based on: A Christmas Carol by Charles Dickens
- Produced by: Gurinder Chadha; Celine Rattray; Trudie Styler; Amory Leader
- Starring: Kunal Nayyar; Leo Suter; Charithra Chandran; Pixie Lott; Danny Dyer; Boy George; Hugh Bonneville; Billy Porter; Eva Longoria; Mia Lomer
- Music by: Nitin Sawhney
- Production companies: Civic Studios; Bend It Films
- Distributed by: True Brit Entertainment
- Release date: 14 November 2025
- Running time: 114 minutes
- Country: United Kingdom
- Language: English
- Box office: $1.4 million

Christmas Karma is a 2025 British Christmas musical comedy-drama film written and directed by Gurinder Chadha. A Bollywood-inspired adaptation of the Charles Dickens 1843 novella A Christmas Carol, the film features an ensemble cast including Kunal Nayyar, Leo Suter, Charithra Chandran, Pixie Lott, Danny Dyer, Boy George, Hugh Bonneville, Billy Porter, and Eva Longoria.

Christmas Karma was released in the United Kingdom by True Brit Entertainment on 14 November 2025. It received widely negative reviews.

== Plot ==
On Christmas Eve in London, selfish Indian businessman Eshaan Sood fires his staff after catching them holding an office party, sparing his accountant, Bob Cratchit. Sood is approached by his nephew Raj and invited to his house for Christmas, which he declines, disparaging Raj for having married an English woman. On his way home, Sood is harassed by a racist drunk and annoyed by a taxi driver attempting to make small talk. Sood shames an Indian shopkeeper for making poor business decisions but is himself shamed for forgetting his roots. Upon arriving at his house, Sood reprimands a choir near his house and sees the face of his deceased business partner, Marley, in his door. Sood's housekeeper Mrs. Joshi tells him off for keeping her in the dark by not wanting to pay more for his electricity bill. Sood goes to bed but is disturbed by noises coming from the house, which are revealed to be from the ghost of Marley. Marley warns Sood that he is damned to walk the earth in chains once he dies unless he changes his ways and that he will be visited by three spirits throughout the night.

Sood attempts to go back to sleep but is awoken by the Ghost of Christmas Past, who takes him back to his childhood. In the past, Sood lived in Uganda with his friend Akiiki but was forced to leave after Idi Amin's deportation of Indians in 1972. Sood would be taken to a refugee center where his father died of a broken heart. Later, as a young adult, Sood was employed by a businessman by the name of Mr. Fezzywig and met his future love, Bea. Sood is shown their romance and an incident where he was attacked in a hate crime. Sood started his company after Bea's parents believed he wouldn't be able to financially support her, and refused to help Fezzywig when he fell on hard times, leaving him to die penniless. Despite proving his worth to Bea's parents, she discovered what he did to Fezzywig and left him. Sood is shown that Bea married another man and became a happy mother.

Sood later meets the Ghost of Christmas Present, who tells him to be more open-minded about the faith of others. He is then taken to Raj's party, where he finds his former employees badmouthing him and celebrating. Sood is also shown to Cratchit's family, with Bob showing sympathy for Sood's depression. Sood is informed that Bob's son Tim has a tumor that will eventually kill him unless he gets to a specialist in Switzerland.

Sood begins to feel remorse for his behavior while trying to justify it to present by bringing up the discrimination and hardship he faces, but is reprimanded and told that others should not suffer because of his pain. Sood finally meets the Ghost of Christmas Yet To Come, who shows him his future. Sood discovers that in this timeline, he has died of a heart attack and that his funeral is only attended by Bob and Mrs. Joshi. Sood is then shown that Tim died of his condition around the same time; a despondent Sood tearfully promises that he will reform and make up for his ways and wakes up on Christmas day.

Filled with newfound joy, Sood begins to make up for his actions from the previous night by donating to the choir's charity, engaging with the taxi driver, buying all the shopkeepers wares so that he can take the day off, re-hiring his employees, apologising to Raj, and giving Bob a promotion and higher pay. Tim's surgery is also funded by Sood, and a party is held at a Christmas fair. Sood travels back to Uganda to reunite with Akiiki, sailing away with him to explore the country.

== Cast ==
- Kunal Nayyar as Mr. Eshaan Sood
- Leo Suter as Bob Cratchit
- Charithra Chandran as Bea Fernandez
- Pixie Lott as Mary Cratchit
- Danny Dyer as Cabbie
- Boy George as the Ghost of Christmas Future
- Hugh Bonneville as Jacob Marley
- Billy Porter as the Ghost of Christmas Present
- Eva Longoria as the Ghost of Christmas Past
- Ali Asghar Shah as Ali
- Bilal Hasna as Young Eshaan (Eddie) Sood
- Nitin Ganatra as Parduman Singh (Shopkeeper)
- Allan Corduner as Mr Fezzywig
- Rufus Jones as Rupert Holly
- Tracy-Ann Oberman as Mrs. Fezzywig
- Eve Jihan Cooper as Herself
- Shobu Kapoor as Mrs Joshi

== Production ==
Financing for Christmas Karma is from Civic Studios. Gurinder Chadha, Celine Rattray, Trudie Styler, and Amory Leader serve as producers, with Zygi Kamasa, Anushka Shah, Paul Mayeda Berges, Sophia Pedlow, and Hannah Leader as executive producers.

The film is written, directed and produced by Chadha, who spoke in Parliament in January 2024, to discuss the British film industry. There, she told MPs her upcoming film would have an Indian lead character, saying "My Scrooge is an Indian Tory who hates refugees". The project was subsequently described as a Bollywood musical inspired by Charles Dickens's A Christmas Carol. It features music from Gary Barlow, Shaznay Lewis, and Nitin Sawhney.

The ensemble cast is led by Kunal Nayyar as a contemporary Scrooge, called Mr Sood, who despises refugees despite being one himself, and becomes haunted by three ghosts of Christmas past, present and future; played by Eva Longoria, Billy Porter and Boy George.

The Expulsion of Indians from Uganda is a central narrative in the story of Mr Sood.

Hugh Bonneville, Leo Suter, Charithra Chandran, Pixie Lott, Danny Dyer, Bilal Hasna, Allan Corduner, Tracy-Ann Oberman, Rufus Jones, Eve, and Nitin Ganatra also appear.

Principal photography began on 22 April 2024. Images from the set in London appeared in the British media in May 2024. Nayyar was moved while filming the past scenes.

Ketchup Entertainment acquired US distribution rights.

== Soundtrack ==
No.	Title	Writer(s)	Singer(s)	Length
1.	"Christmas Karma"		Shaznay Lewis, Pixie Lott, and Austin Howard
2.	"Manz a Scrooge"		Doc Brown, Lady Leshurr, and Shaznay Lewis
3.	"A Gift Is Still a Gift"		Leo Suter and Pixie Lott
4.	"Funky Christmas Feeling"		Joy Farrukh
5.	"Money Talks"	Gary Barlow	Gary Barlow
6.	"Pain of the Past – Part 1: Africa"		Boy George
7.	"Pain of the Past – Part 2: England"		Boy George
8.	"Rise Up"		Billy Porter
9.	"Boy Inside the Man"		Leo Suter and Pixie Lott
10.	"Christmas Bhangra Karma Featuring Jind Mahi"		Jassi Sidhu and Malkit Singh
11.	"Pain of the Past – Part 3: The Future"		Boy George
12.	"Favourite Time of the Year"		Shaznay Lewis and Joy Farrukh
13.	"Christmas Karma / Bhangra Song / Jind Mahi Finale"		Sidhu and Singh
14.	"Boy Inside the Man – African Finale"		Gary Barlow
15.	"Last Christmas (Desi Version)"	George Michael	Priyanka Chopra
16.	"Christmas Karma (Radio Edit)"		Shaznay Lewis, Pixie Lott, and Austin Howard
17.	"Rise Up (Radio Edit)’"		Billy Porter
18.	"Last Christmas (Sitar / Guitar Version)"	George Michael	Anoushka Shankar and Nitin Sawhney

== Reception ==
Following its announcement, GB News criticized the then-proposed project as a "woke re-write". Following its release, the film opened to widely negative reception, receiving The Daily Telegraph's second ever zero star review, with film critic Robbie Collin calling it "the worst film since Cats". Peter Bradshaw of The Guardian wrote that the film "has given me an overload of Yuletide nausea." Empire film magazine was more positive, with John Nugent awarding the film two stars, writing "Gurinder Chadha’s Dickens do-over is a typically original perspective on a canonical classic, if let down by its stretched production values and unlikable songs. But it aims only to be a crowd-pleaser, and may yet become one." Marc Burrows offered a more positive review of the film, despite noting its flaws. In an review for Film Ireland, Tanvi Gawali had mixed reactions.

== See also ==
- List of Christmas films
- List of ghost films
- Adaptations of A Christmas Carol
- List of 21st century films considered the worst
