= Ladies Night (play) =

1987 New Zealand play by Stephen Sinclair and Anthony McCarten

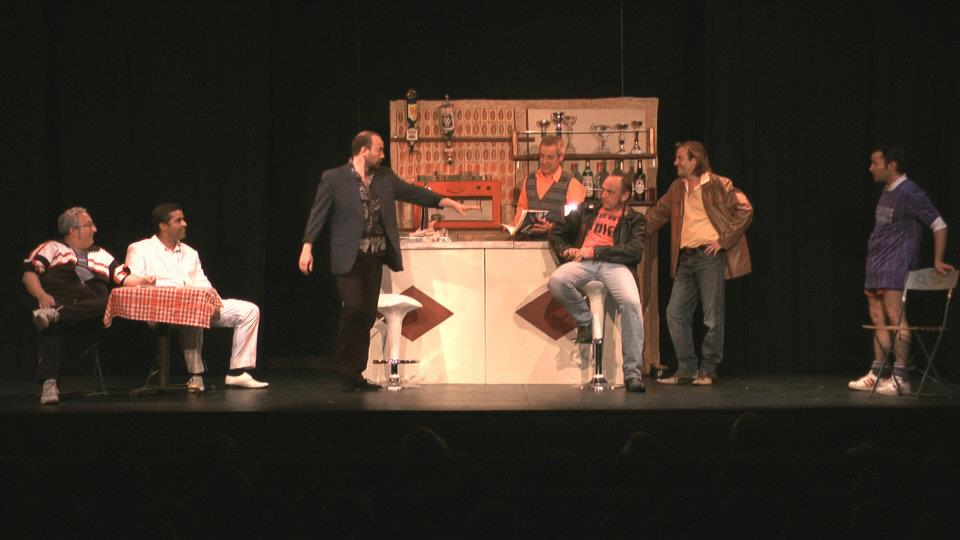
A French production of Ladies Night in 2011.

Ladies' Night is a play by the New Zealand writers Stephen Sinclair and Anthony McCarten about a group of unemployed workers who develop a male strip show.

== Performances ==
It was first performed in December 1987 at Auckland's Mercury Theatre and is the most commercially successful play in New Zealand's theatre history. It had several national sell-out tours in the UK since 1990 and has been translated into sixteen languages. It continues to play worldwide to popular acclaim. In 2001, the Paris production at the Théâtre Rive Gauche in a French adaptation by Jacques Collard received the Molière Award for Best Comedy.

== Development ==
The first season was workshopped with the actors for month before opening, with the season rapidly selling out. Actors included Bruce Hopkins, Michael Lawrence, Shane Dawson, Nigel Harbrow, Ross Duncan and Alison Bruce.

== Full Monty lawsuit ==
In 1998, McCarten launched a multimillion-pound lawsuit in California, US, against the producers of the 1997 film The Full Monty, which has a strikingly similar theme and was the highest-grossing British film at the time. It was dismissed because the film had been made in the United Kingdom.

Thus, McCarten and Sinclair filed a £180 million British lawsuit against the producers of The Full Monty in 1998. They claim that the film blatantly infringed on their play Ladies Night, which toured both Britain and New Zealand. Anthony McCarten and Stephen Sinclair created a website containing their play in response to statements from the producers of The Full Monty that claimed the two productions were not alike. The underlying rights were attributed to co-producer Paul Bucknor, and the lawsuit was settled out of court; as part of the agreement, the website containing Ladies Night was shut down.
