= The Collaboration (film) =

Upcoming film by Kwame Kwei-Armah

- Directed by: Kwame Kwei-Armah
- Screenplay by: Anthony McCarten
- Based on: The Collaboration by Anthony McCarten
- Produced by: Anthony McCarten; Denis O'Sullivan; Jeff Kalligheri
- Starring: Paul Bettany; Jeremy Pope; Daniel Brühl; Melissa Barrera; Henry Hunter Hall
- Cinematography: Robert Yeoman
- Edited by: Paul Machliss
- Production companies: Muse Of Fire Productions; Compelling Pictures; Marina Studios Productions; Live Wire Entertainment
- Country: United States
- Language: English

The Collaboration is an upcoming American biographical drama film directed by Kwame Kwei-Armah (in his feature debut) and adapted by Anthony McCarten from his 2022 stage play. The film stars Paul Bettany and Jeremy Pope, reprising the roles of Andy Warhol and Jean-Michel Basquiat that they performed in the original run of the stage play in February 2022 in London's West End, and for an extended run on Broadway into February 2023.

== Premise ==
Two contrasting artists, Andy Warhol and Jean-Michel Basquiat, begin a successful collaboration in 1980s New York after being paired by art collector Bruno Bischofberger.

== Cast ==
- Paul Bettany as Andy Warhol
- Jeremy Pope as Jean-Michel Basquiat
- Daniel Brühl as Bruno Bischofberger
- Melissa Barrera as Maya
- Henry Hunter Hall as Michael Stewart
- Andrea Sooch as Julia Warhol
- Andrew Fama as Jed
- Erin Eva Butcher as Pat Hackett
- Charlie Statires as Peter
- Yrsa Daley-Ward as Grace Jones

== Production ==
In February 2022 it was announced that Anthony McCarten had adapted his stage play and would produce a film version alongside Denis O’Sullivan with Kwame Kwei-Armah directing. Paul Bettany and Jeremy Pope would reprise their roles from the original run of the stage play as Andy Warhol and Jean-Michel Basquiat, respectively. In August 2022 Daniel Brühl was added to the cast, while Hannah Beachler would serve as production designer and Robert Yeoman as cinematographer. In September 2022 Melissa Barrera was revealed to be joining the cast, while Paul Machliss would edit the film. Filming started in 2022 in the Greater Boston area with scenes filmed in the Marina Studios in Quincy, Massachusetts from September 14, 2022, and parts of Lynn, Massachusetts doubling up as 1980s New York.

== Release ==
Bettany told The New York Observer in late 2022 that the film hadn't been edited at that point, with an earliest release date of late summer 2023, perhaps in Venice - but without firm plans. No updates on the status of the film have been reported since December 2022, and as of November 2026 it has no projected release window.
