= A Banquet of Consequences =

2015 novel by Elizabeth George

- First US edition
- Author: Elizabeth George
- Series: Inspector Lynley
- Genre: Crime novel
- Publisher: Viking Press (US); Hodder & Stoughton (UK)
- Publication date: 2015
- Publication place: United States
- Media type: Print (hardcover, paperback)
- ISBN: 9780525954330 (first)
- Preceded by: Just One Evil Act
- Followed by: The Punishment She Deserves

A Banquet of Consequences is a crime novel by Elizabeth George. It is the author's 20th novel featuring Inspector Lynley and Detective Barbara Havers of Scotland Yard.

== Plot ==
Lynley and Havers are called to investigate the poisoning of Clare Abbott, a feminist writer, and thereby uncover a series of human connections, including links to the suicide of a troubled young man three years previously. Meanwhile, Havers, under pressure to redeem her professional reputation, struggles to reinvent herself after heading to Dorset to pursue a lead, while Lynley remains in London to pursue another avenue of investigation, whilst attempting to further his relationship with Daidre, a vet who works at London Zoo.

== Themes ==
Some of the novel's themes include: guilt, loss, "motherhood gone wrong" and "what it means to be a modern woman".

== Reception ==
The novel reached number 19 on the 2015 best sellers list of the New York Times.

Reviews were generally good: some reviewers commented negatively on the length of the novel, whilst praising the satisfying nature of the read. Kirkus Reviews described George's books in their review of A Banquet of Consequences as "a shade too long, but... always satisfying," while The Washington Times called it: "one of Ms. George’s best mysteries, original in concept and fascinating in the breadth of its characters."
