= Paul Bettany =

English actor (born 1971)

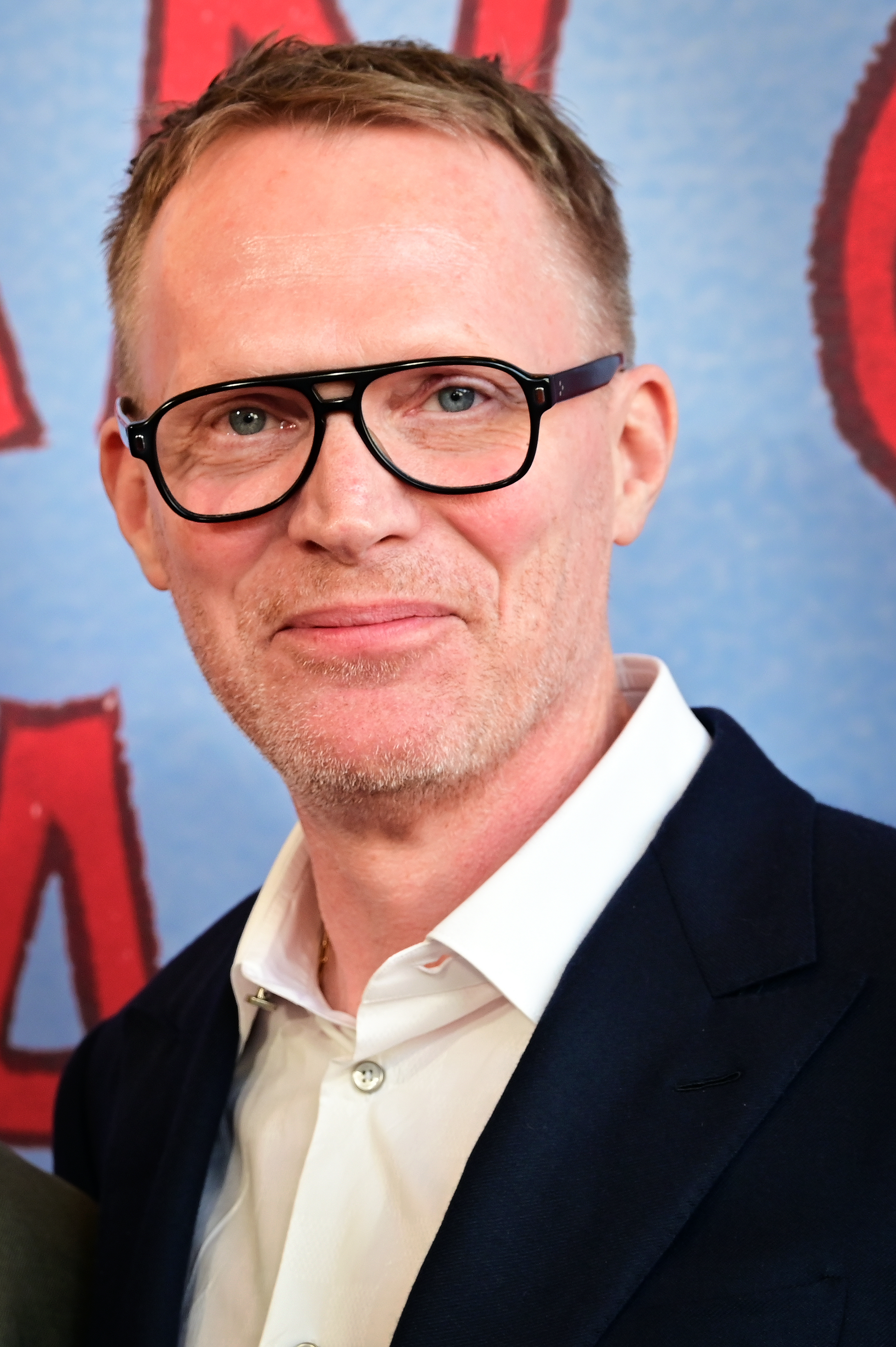
- Bettany in 2026
- Born: 27 May 1971 (age 55); London, England (Note: Sources differ as the exact location in London. Locations have been given as Harlesden, and as Shepherd's Bush. In other sources he is stated as having been in a Harlesden estate in his youth, and being a "boy from Harlesden". One source states he grew up in Shepherd's Bush.)
- Citizenship: United Kingdom; United States
- Education: Drama Centre London
- Occupation: Actor
- Years active: 1992–present
- Spouse: Jennifer Connelly (m. 2003)
- Children: 3
- Father: Thane Bettany

Paul Bettany (born 27 May 1971) is an English actor. He has portrayed the Vision and other various roles in the Marvel Cinematic Universe, including the Disney+ series WandaVision (2021) and VisionQuest (2026), the former of which garnered him a Primetime Emmy Award nomination.

Bettany appeared in the films Gangster No. 1 (2000), A Knight's Tale (2001), and A Beautiful Mind (2001). He was nominated for a BAFTA Award for playing Stephen Maturin in the film Master and Commander: The Far Side of the World (2003). He also featured in Dogville (2003), Wimbledon (2004), The Da Vinci Code (2006), The Tourist (2010), Margin Call (2011), Legend (2015), and Solo: A Star Wars Story (2018). He made his directorial debut with the film Shelter (2014), which he also wrote and co-produced.

In television, Bettany has portrayed Ian Campbell, 11th Duke of Argyll in the series A Very British Scandal (2021). On stage, he played Andy Warhol in the West End and Broadway productions of The Collaboration (2022).

== Early life ==
Bettany was born on 27 May 1971 in London to Anne (née Kettle), a stage singer, theatre teacher, and stage manager, and Thane Bettany, a dancer, actor, drama teacher, and godfather to Sophie, Duchess of Edinburgh. Bettany was raised Catholic, although his church attendance drifted after his Confirmation. Bettany then experimented with other Christian denominations, attending Methodist and Church of England congregations with his father before becoming an atheist. While his father taught at Queenswood School, an all-girls boarding school near Hatfield, Hertfordshire, the family lived on the school grounds.

When Bettany was 16, his brother Matthew died at age 8 after falling onto concrete from a tennis pavilion roof at Queenswood. Soon after, Bettany dropped out of school, left home, and became a street performer in London. He lived in a small flat and earned money by playing his guitar in the streets as a busker. His parents later divorced. After two years, he found a new job in a home for the elderly. After working there for a year, Bettany enrolled at the Drama Centre London.

== Career ==
In 1990, at the age of 19, Bettany began a three-year course at the Drama Centre London in Chalk Farm. He made his stage debut in Stephen Daldry's acclaimed West End revival of An Inspector Calls at the Aldwych Theatre, playing the part of Eric Birling. He also appeared in the Royal Shakespeare Company's productions of Richard III, Romeo and Juliet, and Julius Caesar (for which he received a Charleson Award nomination). When Bettany was 21, he appeared in a BBC production of Oliver Twist, playing Bill Sikes.

After appearing in the finale of Sean Bean's series Sharpe as William II of the Netherlands at the Battle of Waterloo, he made his film debut with a small part in Bent, a Holocaust drama which also featured Clive Owen, Jude Law, and Ian McKellen. He continued doing work in stage and television: these included Joe Penhall's Love and Understanding, which played at London's Bush Theatre and then ran in Connecticut. He had roles in the television productions Killer Net and Coming Home, during which he met and dated Emily Mortimer. His last stage work was in One More Wasted Year and Stranger's House at the Royal Court Theatre. He filmed several more movies, including his first leading role in Gangster No. 1. The British Independent Film Awards nominated him for Best Actor, and the London Film Critics' Circle nominated him for British Newcomer of the Year.

Back in Hollywood, writer/director Brian Helgeland (L.A. Confidential) was planning a new film called The Sin Eater (also known as The Order). He was impressed by Bettany's audition tape, though Helgeland eventually decided to film A Knight's Tale instead. The studio executives were not impressed, but Helgeland was determined to cast him, even writing the part of Geoffrey Chaucer for him. A Knight's Tale would be Bettany's first big Hollywood production. He received critical acclaim for A Knight's Tale, including winning the London Film Critics Circle Award for Best British Supporting Actor. After the movie wrapped, Helgeland, determined that Hollywood should recognise Bettany's talent, showed the audition tape to many of his peers, including Ron Howard, who cast Bettany in A Beautiful Mind alongside Russell Crowe and Jennifer Connelly. After A Beautiful Mind, Bettany was offered the role of serial killer Francis Dolarhyde in Red Dragon, opposite Edward Norton and Anthony Hopkins. He turned down the role due to his commitment to a role in Lars von Trier's Dogville.

Bettany's next major project saw him starring again alongside A Beautiful Mind costar Russell Crowe in Peter Weir's Master and Commander: The Far Side of the World. His portrayal of surgeon and naturalist Stephen Maturin brought him a BAFTA nomination, and he was named British Actor of the Year (London Film Critics' Circle), and Best Actor (Evening Standard).

On 28 June 2004, Bettany and 13 other actors were included in the 2004 invitation to join the Academy of Motion Picture Arts and Sciences. Dogville and The Reckoning were released in limited cinemas in 2004. In September of that year, Bettany made his leading-man debut in Wimbledon, a romantic comedy with Kirsten Dunst. The film's cast would also introduce him to Jon Favreau, playing his manager, a relationship that would return when Favreau cast him as the voice of J.A.R.V.I.S. in Iron Man. In mid-2005, Bettany filmed Firewall in Vancouver, Canada, a thriller also starring Harrison Ford and Virginia Madsen, which reunited him with Wimbledon director Richard Loncraine. He spent the autumn of 2005 filming The Da Vinci Code, based on Dan Brown's best-selling novel and starring Tom Hanks, Audrey Tautou and Ian McKellen. In the film, he played an Opus Dei monk named Silas.

In 2007, Bettany went to London to star in There For Me, written by his friends Dan Fredenburgh and Doraly Rosen. In 2008, he appeared in the New Line Cinema family fantasy Inkheart, playing the part of a fire-eater named Dustfinger. In 2009, he appeared as Charles Darwin in Creation, starring opposite his own wife Jennifer Connelly. In 2010, Bettany appeared alongside Johnny Depp and Angelina Jolie in The Tourist and portrayed the archangel Michael in Legion, a film depicting divine vengeance upon humanity. He starred in the films Priest and Margin Call, both released in 2011.

Bettany reprised his voice role as J.A.R.V.I.S. in 2010's Iron Man 2, 2012's The Avengers, 2013's Iron Man 3, and Disneyland's Innoventions attraction. In 2014, Bettany starred alongside Johnny Depp and fellow British actor Rebecca Hall in the feature film Transcendence. He was once again paired with Depp in Mortdecai, a 2015 motion picture also starring Gwyneth Paltrow and Ewan McGregor. After voicing J.A.R.V.I.S. for seven years, Bettany made his first onscreen appearance in a Marvel Cinematic Universe film in the 2015 film Avengers: Age of Ultron, playing Vision. He reprised the role in the sequels Captain America: Civil War (2016) and Avengers: Infinity War (2018).

Bettany portrayed Ted Kaczynski in the Discovery Channel television show Manhunt: Unabomber. Bettany replaced Michael K. Williams as crime boss Dryden Vos in Solo: A Star Wars Story, after Williams was removed from the final film, as he was unable to return to set during the film's reshoots. Bettany was cast in his place, with the character being reworked from a motion-capture alien to a human. On 20 January 2018, it was reported that Bettany was nearing a deal to play Prince Philip, Duke of Edinburgh in the Netflix series The Crown, succeeding Matt Smith. Days later, on 25 January, it was reported by TVLine that Bettany was ultimately unable to sign on due to scheduling conflicts.

Bettany starred alongside Elizabeth Olsen in the Marvel television miniseries WandaVision, portraying a new version of his Marvel Cinematic Universe character, Vision, with Olsen portraying the titular Wanda. It premiered on Disney+ in January 2021, garnering praise from critics. Reviewing the series, Matt Purslow of IGN wrote Bettany "effortlessly takes to the comedic skits" and that he and Olsen "provide a fantastic amount of life, wit, and emotion". For his performance, Bettany received nominations for the Primetime Emmy Award for Outstanding Lead Actor in a Limited or Anthology Series or Movie and Golden Globe Award for Best Actor – Miniseries or Television Film. Bettany reprised the role of Vision in the spinoff miniseries VisionQuest (2026) and is set to reprise the role in the 2027 film Avengers: Secret Wars.

Bettany starred in the 2021 miniseries A Very British Scandal. He played artist Andy Warhol in a production of the play The Collaboration by Anthony McCarten at the Young Vic in London from February to April 2022. He is slated to reprise the role in a film adaptation of the play.

In 2020, Bettany was announced to portray businessman Alexander Nix in a feature film about the Facebook–Cambridge Analytica data scandal, to be produced by AGBO with a script by Christopher Markus and Stephen McFeely. The project, later linked to director Peter Farrelly, did not move forward and remains unproduced. He was also announced to co-write and star in the dramedy film Harvest Moon for Miramax.

== Personal life ==
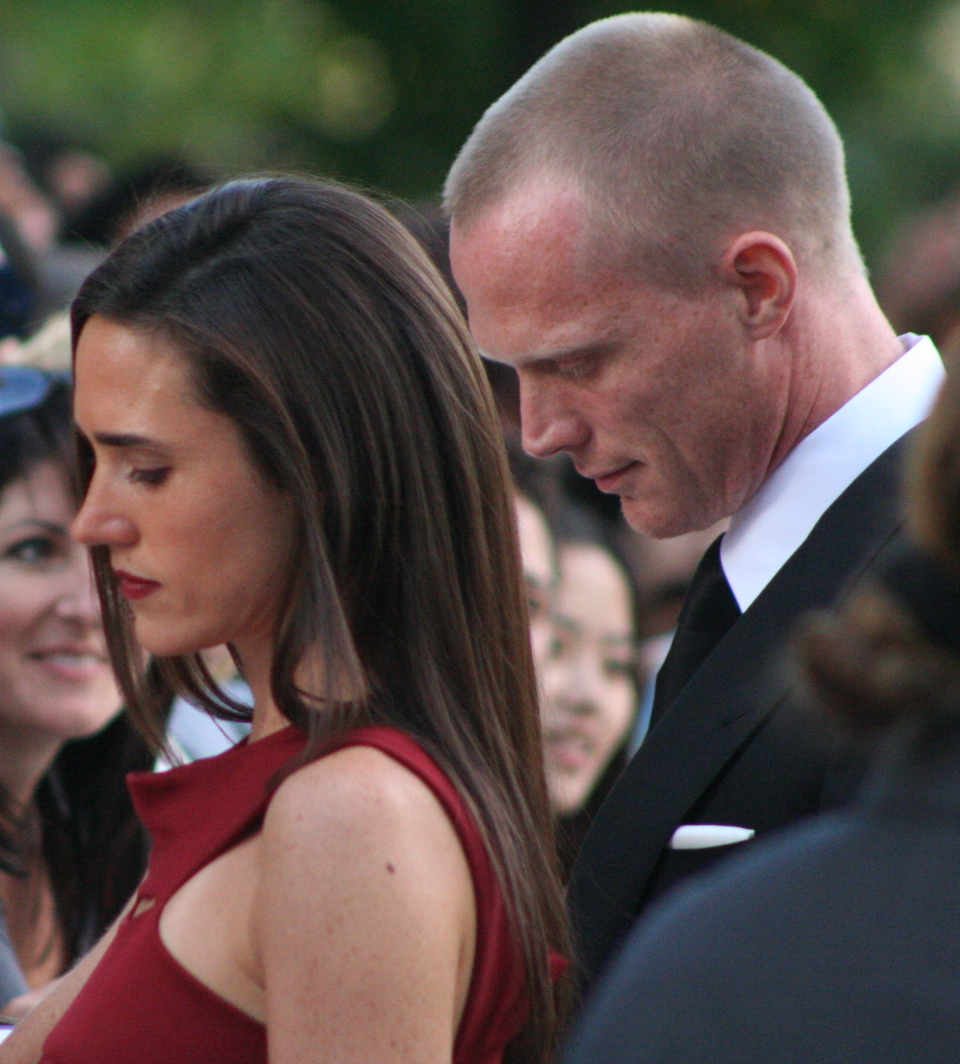
Bettany and his wife Jennifer Connelly at the 2009 Toronto International Film Festival

On 1 January 2003, Bettany married American actress Jennifer Connelly in Scotland, whom he met when they starred together in the 2001 film A Beautiful Mind. As a teenager, he had developed a crush on her after seeing her in the 1986 film Labyrinth. The September 11 attacks motivated him to act on his feelings for her, and after two days of attempting to contact her, he proposed, despite not being in a relationship. Soon after their marriage, they moved to Brooklyn Heights after living in Tribeca. The couple have two children together. Bettany is stepfather to Connelly's son from a previous relationship.

Text messages between Bettany and Johnny Depp from 2013 were used as evidence in 2020 during Depp's defamation trial against The Sun and in 2022 as part of Depp's defamation trial against his ex-wife, actress Amber Heard although Bettany has since denied being a "close friend" of Depp and claimed they hadn't spoken in years.

Bettany is a lifelong supporter of Arsenal F.C.

== Filmography ==
=== Film ===
Year	Title	Role	Notes	Ref.
1997	Bent	Captain		
1998	The Land Girls	Philip		
1999	After The Rain	Steph		
2000	Kiss Kiss (Bang Bang)	Jimmy		
2000	Dead Babies	Quentin		
2000	Gangster No. 1	Young Gangster		
2001	A Knight's Tale	Geoffrey Chaucer		
2001	A Beautiful Mind	Charles Herman		
2002	The Heart of Me	Rickie		
2003	Master and Commander: The Far Side of the World	Stephen Maturin		
2003	Dogville	Tom Edison		
2004	The Reckoning	Nicholas		
2004	Wimbledon	Peter Colt		
2005	Stories of Lost Souls	Y	Segment: "Euston Road"	
2006	Firewall	Bill Cox		
2006	The Da Vinci Code	Silas		
2008	Iron Man	J.A.R.V.I.S.	Voice	
2008	The Secret Life of Bees	T. Ray Owens		
2008	Inkheart	Dustfinger		
2008	Broken Lines	Chester		
2009	The Young Victoria	Lord Melbourne		
2009	Creation	Charles Darwin		
2010	Legion	Michael		
2010	Iron Man 2	J.A.R.V.I.S.	Voice	
2010	The Tourist	John Acheson		
2011	Priest	Priest		
2011	Margin Call	Will Emerson		
2012	The Avengers	J.A.R.V.I.S.	Voice	
2013	Iron Man 3	J.A.R.V.I.S.	Voice	
2013	Blood	Joe Fairburn		
2014	Transcendence	Max Waters		
2014	Shelter	—N/a	Writer & director only	
2015	Mortdecai	Jock Strapp		
2015	Avengers: Age of Ultron	J.A.R.V.I.S. (voice), Vision		
2015	Legend	Charlie Richardson	Uncredited	
2016	Captain America: Civil War	Vision		
2017	Journey's End	Osborne		
2018	Avengers: Infinity War	Vision		
2018	Solo: A Star Wars Story	Dryden Vos		
2020	Uncle Frank	Frank Bledsoe		
2024	Here	Al Young		
TBA	Cry to Heaven †	Maestro Porpora	Post-production	
TBA	The Collaboration †	Andy Warhol	Post-production	

Key
†	Denotes films that have not yet been released

=== Television ===
Year	Title	Role	Notes	Ref.
1994	Wycliffe	Ian Greaves	1 episode	
1996	The Bill	Jake Connolly	1 episode	
1997	Sharpe's Waterloo	Prince William of Orange	Television film	
1998	Coming Home	Edward Carey-Lewis	Miniseries, 2 episodes	
1998	Killer Net	Joe Hunter	Miniseries, 4 episodes	
1999	Every Woman Knows a Secret	Rob	Miniseries, 3 episodes	
2000	David Copperfield	James Steerforth	Television film	
2017	Manhunt	Ted Kaczynski	Main role, 8 episodes	
2021	WandaVision	Vision / Hex Vision	Miniseries, 9 episodes	
2021	Marvel Studios: Assembled	Himself	Episode: "Assembled: The Making of WandaVision"	
2021	What If...?	Vision, J.A.R.V.I.S. (voice)	2 episodes	
2021	A Very British Scandal	Ian Campbell, 11th Duke of Argyll	Miniseries, 3 episodes	
2025	Amadeus	Antonio Salieri	Miniseries, 5 episodes	
2026	VisionQuest	Vision, Proto-One (voice), Doctor Phineas Horton, J.I.M. / The Synthetic Man	Miniseries, 8 episodes; Also executive producer	

Key
†	Denotes television productions that have not yet been released

=== Theatre ===
Year	Title	Role	Venue	Ref.
1993	An Inspector Calls	Eric Birling	Aldwych Theatre, West End	
1995	Romeo & Juliet	Paris	Royal Shakespeare Company	
1995	Julius Caesar	Decius Brutus/Strato	Royal Shakespeare Company	
1995	Richard III	Richmond	Royal Shakespeare Company	
1997	One More Wasted Year		Royal Court Theatre, West End	
1997	Love and Understanding	Richie	Bush Theatre, West End	
2022	The Collaboration	Andy Warhol	Young Vic, West End; Manhattan Theatre Club, Broadway	

== Awards and nominations ==
Association	Year	Category	Work	Result	Ref.
Beijing International Film Festival Awards	2018	Best Supporting Actor	Journey's End	Won	
British Academy Film Awards	2004	Best Actor in a Supporting Role	Master and Commander: The Far Side of the World	Nominated	
British Independent Film Awards	2000	Best Actor	Gangster No. 1	Nominated	
Camerimage Awards	2015	Best Directorial Debut	Shelter	Nominated	
Chicago Film Critics Association Awards	2002	Most Promising Performer	—	Nominated	
Critics' Choice Movie Awards	2004	Best Supporting Actor	Master and Commander: The Far Side of the World	Nominated	
Critics' Choice Super Awards	2022	Best Actor in a Superhero Series	WandaVision	Nominated	
Critics' Choice Television Awards	2022	Best Actor in a Movie/Miniseries	WandaVision	Nominated	
Empire Awards	2005	Best British Actor	WandaVision	Nominated	
Evening Standard British Film Awards	2003	Best Actor	Master and Commander: The Far Side of the World; The Heart of Me	Won	
Glamour Awards	2006	Man of the Year	—	Won	
Golden Globe Awards	2022	Best Actor – Miniseries or Television Film	WandaVision	Nominated	
Golden Nymph Awards	2021	Best Actor	Uncle Frank	Won	
Gotham Awards	2011	Best Ensemble Performance	Margin Call	Nominated	
GQ Men of the Year Awards	2021	Leading Man of the Year	—	Won	
Hollywood Critics Association TV Awards	2021	Best Actor in a Limited Series, Anthology Series or Television Movie	WandaVision	Nominated	
Hollywood Film Awards	2008	Ensemble Acting of the Year	The Secret Life of Bees	Won	
Independent Spirit Awards	2012	Robert Altman Award	Margin Call	Won	
London Film Critics' Circle Awards	2001	British Newcomer of The Year	Gangster No. 1	Nominated	
London Film Critics' Circle Awards	2002	British Supporting Actor of the Year	A Knight's Tale	Won	
London Film Critics' Circle Awards	2003	British Supporting Actor of the Year	A Beautiful Mind	Nominated	
London Film Critics' Circle Awards	2004	British Actor of the Year	Master and Commander: The Far Side of the World	Won	
MovieGuide Awards	2005	Grace Award for Most Inspiring Actor	The Reckoning	Nominated	
Primetime Emmy Awards	2021	Outstanding Lead Actor in a Limited or Anthology Series or Movie	WandaVision	Nominated	
Satellite Awards	2022	Best Actor – Television Series Musical or Comedy	WandaVision	Nominated	
Saturn Awards	2016	Best Supporting Actor	Avengers: Age of Ultron	Nominated	
Screen Actors Guild Awards	2002	Outstanding Performance by a Cast in a Motion Picture	A Beautiful Mind	Nominated	
Teen Choice Awards	2016	Choice Movie: Chemistry (Note: shared with Chadwick Boseman, Don Cheadle, Robert Downey Jr. and Scarlett Johansson)	Captain America: Civil War	Nominated	
