= Write Away =

Book written by Elizabeth George

- First US edition
- Author: Elizabeth George
- Genre: Non-fiction
- Publisher: HarperCollins (US); Hodder & Stoughton (UK)
- Publication date: 2004
- Publication place: United States
- Media type: Print (hardcover, paperback)
- ISBN: 9780060560423 (first)

Write Away is a book written by Elizabeth George on writing.
