= The Collaboration (play) =

2022 play by Anthony McCarten

- Original language: English
- Written by: Anthony McCarten
- Subject: Painting, art, fashion, race, homosexuality, NYC
- Genre: Drama
- Setting: 1984 New York City

Premiere
- Date: 12 February 2022
- Place: The Young Vic; London

The Collaboration is a dramatic stage play written by New Zealand playwright Anthony McCarten. The play originated in the West End at The Young Vic in London. The original production starred Paul Bettany as Andy Warhol and Jeremy Pope as Jean-Michel Basquiat. The story, set in New York in 1984, centers around the collaboration between Andy Warhol and Jean-Michel Basquiat and their new exhibition. The production transferred on Broadway at the Samuel J. Friedman Theatre in a co-production with the Manhattan Theatre Club and the Young Vic Theatre, starting on 29 November 2022, and ending in February 2023.

== Synopsis ==
The show revolves around the painter and artist Andy Warhol, whose career is falling, and his relationship with the up-and-coming artist Jean-Michel Basquiat. Together, they agree to collaborate on a new art exhibit.

== Background ==
The play was written by the British playwright Anthony McCarten and directed by Kwame Kwei-Armah. It is the second of what McCarten calls his "Worship Trilogy", works that explore the collective fascination with religion, art and money. The first in the installment was his 2019 film The Two Popes starring Anthony Hopkins and Jonathan Pryce as Pope Benedict XVI and Pope Francis. The final installment of the "Worship Trilogy" is Wednesday at Warren's, Friday at Bill's, the upcoming McCarten-scripted adaptation about the meetings between Warren Buffett and Bill Gates that led to the establishment of The Giving Pledge, which encourages extraordinarily wealthy people to give their fortunes to philanthropic causes.

== Cast and characters ==
Role	London	Broadway
Role	2022	
Andy Warhol	Paul Bettany	Paul Bettany
Jean-Michel Basquiat	Jeremy Pope	Jeremy Pope
Bruno Bischofberger	Alec Newman	Erik Jensen
Maya	Sofia Barclay	Krysta Rodriguez

== Productions ==
=== London (2022) ===
The play originated in the West End written by McCarten and directed by Kwei-Armah; the production opened in previews at the Young Vic in London in February 2022 and ended its run in April.

=== Broadway (2022) ===
The production made its New York stage debut on Broadway presented by the Manhattan Theatre Club and directed by Kwei-Armah with Bettany and Pope reprising their roles at the Samuel J. Friedman Theater with previews beginning on 29 November 2022, and an opening night on 18 December. It closed on 11 February 2023.

== Film adaptation ==
In 2022, it was announced that the play would be adapted into a movie of the same name, Kwei-Armah's directorial debut, with Bettany and Pope reprising their roles.

== Critical reception ==
Critical reception for the play was mixed, with praise mostly being focused on the leading performance of Bettany and Pope as Warhol and Basquiat respectively. Time Out said of the play, "It is, as I say, terrific entertainment. But there's no getting away from the fact that it's wildly contrived". The critic Arifa Akbar of The Guardian praised the performances, writing: "Bettany and Pope do so much more than merely ventriloquising their celebrity parts. Bettany captures Warhol's tics – his gawkiness and gormless stares with a deadpan streak of cynicism...Pope gives us a seductive, childlike free spirit in his Basquiat." The Evening Standard's critic, Nick Curtis, praised the performances, describing them as "devastating", "triumphant" and "gorgeous", adding: "McCarten...gives them plenty of big themes – art, commerce, identity, faith, death – to chew on."
