= Bête Noire (Black Mirror) =

- Black Mirror episode
- Promotional posters
- Episode no.: Series 7 Episode 2
- Directed by: Toby Haynes
- Written by: Charlie Brooker
- Cinematography by: Stephan Pehrsson
- Editing by: Matthew Cannings
- Original air date: 10 April 2025
- Running time: 51 minutes

Guest appearances
- Siena Kelly as Maria; Rosy McEwen as Verity Greene; Michael Workeye as Kae; Hannah Griffiths as Luisa; Ben Ashenden as Nick; Ben Bailey Smith as Gabe

Episode chronology
← Previous "Common People"	Next → "Hotel Reverie"

"Bête Noire" is the second episode in the seventh series of the British science fiction anthology television series Black Mirror. Written by series creator and showrunner Charlie Brooker and directed by Toby Haynes, it premiered on Netflix on 10 April 2025, with the rest of series seven.

The episode centers on Maria, a culinary researcher whose reality begins to subtly change after an old classmate begins work at her office. It received generally positive reviews from critics.

== Plot ==
Maria (Siena Kelly) works in research and development at a chocolate-making company, coming up with new recipes. During a focus group taste testing of her latest concept, a chocolate bar filled with a sweet and salty miso jam, one tester, Verity (Rosy McEwen), arrives late. Maria's concept is deemed disgusting by other testers, but Verity says it tastes better the second time, after which they try it again and approve.

Verity catches up with Maria, recognizing her as a former classmate, and informs Maria that she is applying for a position at the company, even though Maria insists that there are no open positions. However, when she checks the website, there is a listing, confirmed by her boss. The next day, Verity is hired after a brief interview and quickly acclimates to the team. Maria finds that her own work has changed, which damages her reputation, while other small changes cause her and others to question her memory. As incidents increase in severity, her mental state worsens, and she begins to suspect that Verity is responsible.

Maria views Verity as a computer-obsessed social outcast. Maria bullied Verity during school years, claiming that Verity had performed sexual favours for a teacher. Maria contacts Natalie, an old schoolmate who had also gossiped about Verity, but discovers that she recently died by suicide. Natalie's husband explains that she had been experiencing similar events to Maria, but he hangs up as Maria begins aggressively questioning him about Verity.

Maria arrives at the office one day to find she has missed an all-staff meeting, further damaging her credibility. Maria and Verity talk and seem to resolve their issues before Verity suddenly and nonchalantly drinks their colleague's entire carton of almond milk in front of Maria, then blames her for it. They review the office security footage, but the feed shows Maria aggressively grabbing and drinking the milk. Maria pleads her innocence by reiterating to everyone that she has a nut allergy, but no one, not even Google, knows of such a term. Maria notices Verity fondling a teardrop-shaped pendant around her neck and, declaring that she is using it to change reality, tries to take it from Verity. Maria is subsequently fired.

That night, Maria follows Verity home and breaks in, discovering a massive server room. Verity discovers Maria hiding under the bed and explains that after finishing school, she became an expert programmer, creating a quantum computer in her home that can shift her to any alternative timeline she desires through real-time data she gathered, using the pendant as the remote, essentially granting her omnipotence. She has been utilizing her reality-bending ability to change timelines around Maria in an attempt to drive her to suicide. Verity reveals she did the same thing to Natalie as revenge for the rumour about the teacher that Maria started. Maria tries to reason with her, but Verity reveals she has tried every path, none of them fully satisfying her due to her lack of closure regarding the rumour. Maria attempts to attack Verity, but Verity alters reality to have armed police arrive, placing a knife in Maria's hand. While restrained, Maria grabs an officer's gun and shoots Verity in the face. She grabs the pendant and uses Verity's fingerprint to shift to a timeline where it works for her, too. After making the police officers believe that Verity committed suicide, she shifts reality several times to her own benefit, ending by making herself the Empress of the Universe.

== Production ==
"Bête Noire" (French for "black beast") is a French term for something that is detested or to be avoided. Brooker said that in an earlier version of the script Verity utilized a ring rather than a pendant, and the episode was titled "Ring of Truth". This title was later discarded as Brooker felt it was "too on the nose". In keeping with the theme of differing perceptions of reality, two versions of the episode were issued in which a chicken restaurant's name mysteriously changes either from "Bernie's" to "Barnie's" or vice versa, varying randomly depending on the Netflix user.

== Analysis ==
The majority of the episode is a psychological drama with a science fiction ending.

A primary theme of the episode is narrative manipulation of reality, which Charlie Brooker and some reviewers have referred to as "gaslighting". The plot also references the Mandela effect, a collective memory phenomenon sometimes interpreted as evidence of alternate realities.

== Reception ==
The episode received generally positive reviews. Reviewers praised the performances of Kelly and McEwen.

=== Episode rankings ===
"Bête Noire" ranked below average on critics' lists of the 34 installments of Black Mirror, from best to worst:

- 12th – Jackie Strause and James Hibberd, The Hollywood Reporter
- 13th – Lucy Ford, Jack King and Brit Dawson, GQ
- 20th – James Hibberd, Christian Holub, and Randall Colburn, Entertainment Weekly
- 21st – Ed Power, The Daily Telegraph
- 22nd – Charles Bramesco, Vulture
- 28th – James Hibbs, Radio Times

IndieWire listed the 33 episodes, excluding Bandersnatch, where "Bête Noire" placed 28th. Wired rated it third-best of the six episodes in series seven. Instead of by quality, Mashable ranked the episodes by tone, concluding that "Bête Noire" was the tenth-least pessimistic episode of the show.
