= I'll Find You (film) =

- Directed by: Martha Coolidge
- Screenplay by: David S. Ward; Bozenna Intrator
- Story by: Zbigniew John Raczynski; Edward Lee; Marcin Ziebinski; Ariadna Lewanska
- Produced by: Bozenna Intrator; Lukasz Raczynski; Zbigniew John Raczynski; Fred Roos
- Starring: Adelaide Clemens; Leo Suter; Stephen Dorff; Connie Nielsen; Stellan Skarsgård
- Cinematography: Alexander Gruszynski
- Edited by: Richard Chew; Eric A. Sears; Paul Seydor
- Music by: Jan A.P. Kaczmarek
- Production companies: Music, War and Love; FR Production; Bovenkon
- Distributed by: Gravitas Ventures
- Release dates: July 6, 2019 (Taormina Film Festival); February 25, 2022 (U.S.)
- Running time: 116 minutes
- Countries: United States; Poland
- Language: English

I'll Find You (originally titled Music, War and Love) is a 2019 romantic war drama film directed by Martha Coolidge from a screenplay by Bozenna Intrator and David S. Ward, and starring Adelaide Clemens, Leo Suter, Stephen Dorff, Connie Nielsen and Stellan Skarsgård. Set during the early days of World War II, the film follows two musicians, one Catholic and one Jewish, caught up in the chaos of Poland's invasion by Nazi Germany. I'll Find You debuted on July 6, 2019, at the Taormina Film Festival in Italy. It was released in the United States by Gravitas Ventures on February 25, 2022.

== Plot ==
In 1939 Poland, Robert and Rachel are musical performers (an opera singer and a Jewish violin virtuoso, respectively) who dream of, one day, performing at Carnegie Hall. They are attracted to each other, but their differing faiths hinder it. However, the Nazi invasion of Poland and the arrival of the Second World War lead to the pair becoming separated, and Robert vows to find Rachel again, entering into Germany.

== Cast ==
- Adelaide Clemens as Rachel Rubin
  - Ursula Parker as young Rachel
- Leo Suter as Robert Pulaski
  - Sebastian Croft as young Robert
- Stephen Dorff as General Huber
- Connie Nielsen as Lena Moser Drabowski
- Stellan Skarsgård as Benno Moser
- Toby Sebastian as Vlad Dagmarov
- Sam Gillett as Wolf Mann
- Adam Levy as Aleksander Rubin
- Karolina Porcari as Miriam Rubin
- Sophia Decaro as Sara Rubin
- Jacek Braciak as Josef Kramer
- Jacob Ifan as David Rosenwald

== Reception ==
Review aggregator website Rotten Tomatoes reports an approval rating of 80% based on 10 reviews, with an average rating of 6.60/10.
