= Lynley (TV series) =

British television series

- Genre: Crime drama
- Based on: The Inspector Lynley series by Elizabeth George
- Written by: Steve Thompson
- Directed by: Ed Bazalgette
- Starring: Leo Suter; Sofia Barclay; Michael Workéyè; Daniel Mays; Niamh Walsh
- Countries of origin: United Kingdom; Ireland
- Original language: English
- No. of series: 1
- No. of episodes: 4

Production
- Executive producers: David Stern; Colin Callender; Robert Schildhouse; Stephen Nye; Jon Farrar; Jess O'Riordan; Kate Woods; Sue Deeks
- Producer: Suzanne McAuley
- Running time: 90 minutes
- Production companies: BritBox International; Playground Entertainment; Salt Films; BBC Studios

Original release
- Network: BritBox (United States)
- Release: 4 September 2025 – present
- Network: BBC One (United Kingdom)
- Release: 5 January 2026 – present

Lynley is a British crime drama television series that is an adaptation of the Inspector Lynley novel series by Elizabeth George. Leo Suter plays the title role, Detective Inspector (DI) Tommy Lynley, alongside Sofia Barclay as Detective Sergeant (DS) Barbara Havers. The series premiered on 4 September 2025 on BritBox in the United States and on 5 January 2026 on BBC One in the United Kingdom. On 30 March 2026, BritBox announced the second season, with production underway in Dublin.

== Premise ==
A mismatched crime-solving detective duo working for the fictitious Three Counties police force (covering East Anglia) and based in Norfolk are teamed up: an aristocratic male police inspector and a maverick female sergeant from a working class background. Together, the two become a formidable team, bonded by their integrity and their desire to see justice done, while the series tackles issues around personality, gender, and class.

== Cast and characters ==
- Leo Suter as DI Thomas "Tommy" Lynley, 8th Earl of Asherton
- Sofia Barclay as DS Barbara Havers
- Daniel Mays as Detective Chief Inspector (DCI) Brian Nies
- Niamh Walsh as Helen Clyde
- Michael Workéyè as Tony Bakare
- Rosalyn Wright as Maia Saunders
- Joshua Sher as Simon St. James
- Nadia Parkes as Sofia
- Jack Archer as Frazer
- Eloise Thomas as Cynthia
- Tom Forbes as Gareth
- Oliver Wellington as Leo Hodgson
- Sophie Harkness as Gemma Swift
- Helene Maksoud as Susan Myerson
- Nathaniel Curtis as Prof Hamish Milne
- Kris Hitchen as DI Derek Horwood

== Production ==
The Elizabeth George Inspector Lynley novels are adapted by Steve Thompson, who is also an executive producer. The four-part series is directed by Ed Bazalgette. It is produced by BritBox International, Playground and Salt Films.

The cast is led by Leo Suter and Sofia Barclay and also includes Daniel Mays, Niamh Walsh and Michael Workéyè.

Despite being set in the fictional "Three Counties" constabulary in East Anglia, the series began filming in August 2024 around Dublin, along the Wicklow Mountains, and at Mallow Castle in County Cork. Additional establishing shots were filmed in London, the Norfolk Broads, and the Thames Estuary.

The series calls back to the previous adaption of the books, The Inspector Lynley Mysteries series, filmed between 2001 and 2008, putting Inspector Lynley back in a vintage 1970 Jensen Interceptor Mk II, the same model car featured in the original series.

The series was purchased by the BBC in October 2024. Suzanne McAuley is series producer. David Stern and Colin Callender are executive producers for Playground with Robert Schildhouse, Stephen Nye, Jon Farrar and Jess O'Riordan executive producers for BritBox, Kate Woods executive producer for BBC Studios and Sue Deeks as executive producer for the BBC.

== Broadcast ==
Lynley premiered on 4 September 2025 on BritBox in the United States. In the United Kingdom, the series premiered on 5 January 2026 on BBC One, with all episodes made available on BBC iPlayer the same day.

== Episodes ==
No. overall	No. in series	Title	Directed by	Written by	Original release date	UK air date	UK viewers (millions)
1	1	"A Place of Hiding"	Ed Bazalgette	Steve Thompson	4 September 2025	5 January 2026	4.45
2	2	"This Body of Death"	Ed Bazalgette	Steve Thompson	11 September 2025	12 January 2026	4.13
3	3	"Careless in Red"	Stewart Svaasand	Steve Thompson	18 September 2025	19 January 2026	4.19
4	4	"With No One as a Witness"	Ed Bazalgette	Steve Thompson	25 September 2025	26 January 2026	4.18

== Reception ==
A review in The Guardian described it as "undemanding telly".

In The Independent, Nick Hilton wrote: "It feels cruel, having lamented the inexorable rise of detective dramas that plumb the depths of human despair, to be so underwhelmed by a determinedly old-school offering like Lynley. ... There would be something reassuring about this throwback, if it were better executed. Instead, the eye is drawn constantly to the limitations: the performances, the writing, the convoluted mysteries."

On a positive note, Laura Jane Turner of Digital Spy wrote: "[T]o the show's credit, despite the focus on their developing (and strictly platonic) relationship, Lynley and Havers are afforded equal care and attention as individual characters. We are offered insights into each of their personal lives and further layers of characterisation, elevated by Suter and Barclay's performances and chemistry. While Lynley isn't going to go down as a groundbreaking or game-changing show, it's a solid case-of-the-week that will surely be as enjoyable for fans of the original story as it is for a broader cosy crime audience."
