= In Pursuit of the Proper Sinner =

1999 novel by Elizabeth George

- Author: Elizabeth George
- Series: Inspector Lynley
- Genre: Crime novel
- Publisher: Bantam Books
- Publication date: 1999
- Publication place: United States
- Media type: Print (hardcover, paperback)
- ISBN: 9780553102352 (first)
- Preceded by: Deception on His Mind
- Followed by: A Traitor to Memory

In Pursuit of the Proper Sinner is a 1999 novel by US author Elizabeth George. It is the tenth in the author's series of crime novels featuring Inspector Lynley of Scotland Yard. Lynley investigates two deaths, the daughter of a retired undercover officer and an unidentified man who are found in a prehistoric stone circle in Derbyshire.

== Publication and adaptations ==
The novel was first published in 1999 by Bantam Books. It also exists as an audiobook, narrated by Donada Peters.

It was dramatized for BBC One and appeared as the first episode of Season 3 of the Inspector Lynley Mysteries in 2004.

== Plot ==
The novel opens with the suicide of David King-Ryder, a renowned British musical writer/producer, on the eve of his successful comeback. Meanwhile, in an apparently unrelated incident, Inspector Lynley, newly returned from his honeymoon, is called upon to investigate the murder of Nicola Maiden, the headstrong daughter of Andy Maiden, a retired ex-colleague who Lynley regards as a mentor.

Nicola has been found dead, along with the unidentified body of a young man, in an ancient stone circle in Derbyshire locally known as Nine Sisters Henge. Both victims have met different, though equally violent ends. As Lynley investigates Nicola's death with the help of Sergeant Winston Nkata, his colleague Barbara Havers, who has been demoted following the events of the previous book, seeks to redeem herself by following the trail of the second victim across London. The young man is revealed to be an impoverished artist named Terry Cole, who seems to have no connection with Nicola or her family.

As the parallel investigations progress, it slowly becomes clear to Lynley and Havers that both of the victims were hiding secrets. It is revealed that Nicola had given up her burgeoning career in law to become a professional dominatrix, and suspicion falls on Andy Maiden, as well as on Nicola's aristocratic boyfriend, Julian Britton, and his jealous cousin, Samantha McCallin. Meanwhile, Havers has discovered a link between Terry Cole and the dead composer, Ryder-King, but Lynley dismisses her findings. During the investigation, Lynley has been persuaded that Nicola Maiden was the key to the mystery, whereas Havers believes that Terry Cole was the intended victim, and Nicola, an accidental casualty of circumstance. In the end Havers is proved right, and Lynley is forced to question his decisions and attitudes in the light of his personal bias against her.

== Themes ==
The novel explores the themes of identity, class prejudice, and the complexities of family relationships.

== Reception ==
The novel was well-received, earning a starred review from Publishers Weekly, which says: "The multifaceted surprise ending to the taut, suspenseful plot is the juiciest plum in this can't-put-down novel."
