= Haylee Roderick =

American dancer, choreographer and actress

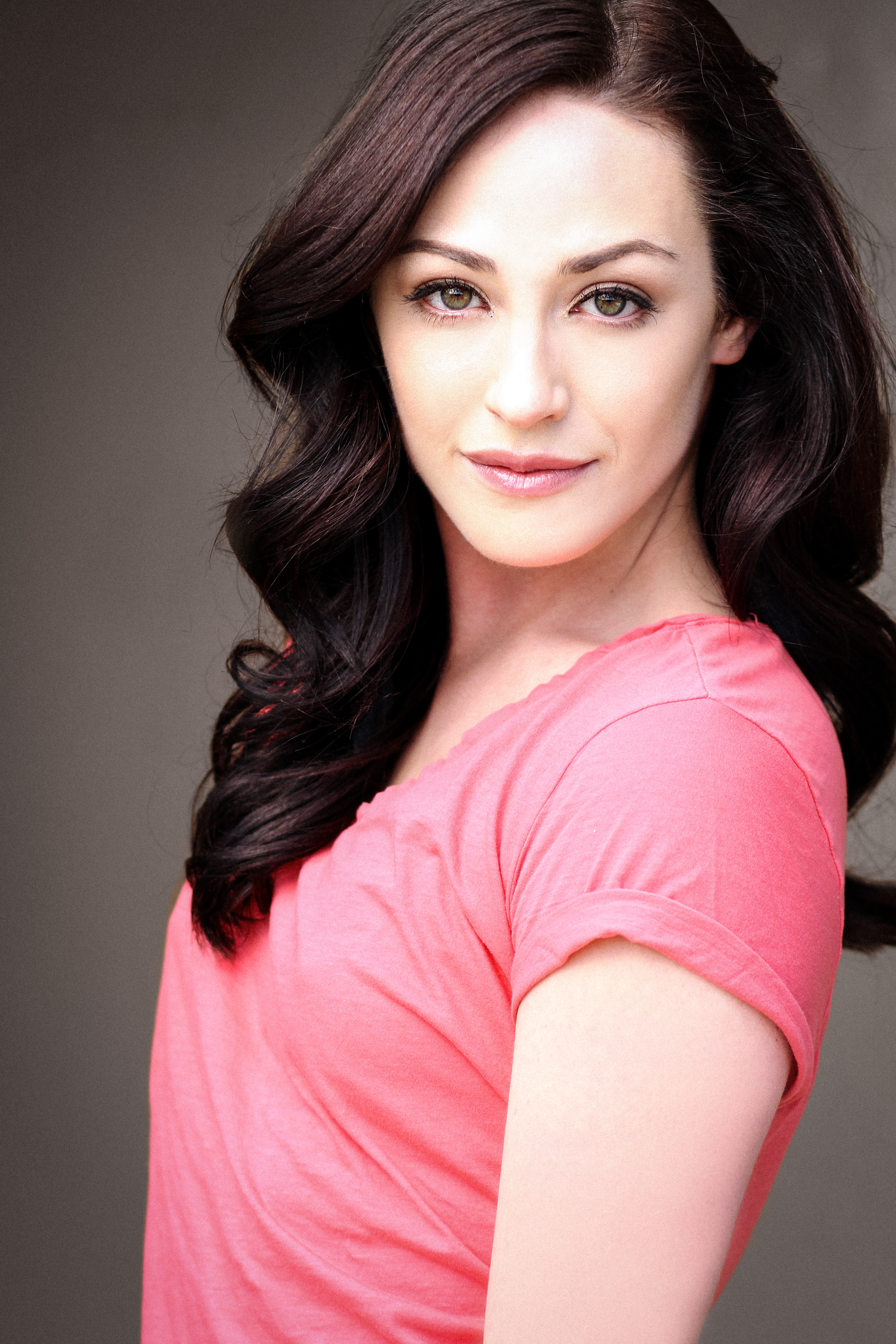
- Roderick in 2014
- Occupation: dancer
- Years active: 2008–present
- Height: 5 ft 6 in (168 cm)
- Spouse: Leo Suter (m. 2023)
- Website: HayleeRoderick.com

Haylee Roderick is an American dancer.

== Career ==
Roderick is a professional dancer and choreographer. She has received training in contemporary ballet, jazz, and hip-hop at the Center Stage Performing Arts Studio in Orem, Utah. She was a troupe dancer in the Disney film High School Musical 3. She was also one of many performers in the 82nd Academy Awards. Roderick is a dancer on Glee and has accompanied the cast for the Glee Live! In Concert! tour. She is on the April 2011 cover of Dance Spirit Magazine. Roderick has been featured in music videos, including Hotel Nacional by Gloria Estefan featuring Susan Lucci, Patient by Twin Shadow, Eight Days by Chelsea Williams, and Over You by Zak Waters. In 2023, she performed as a dancer in the eighth season of RuPaul's Drag Race All Stars. Now she provides personalized, expressive, and technique-driven instruction at her home studio, empowering dancers to grow creatively, confidently, and fluently in their movements.

== Filmography ==
Film
Year	Title	Role	Notes
2008	High School Musical 3: Senior Year	Troupe dancer	
2008	The American Mall	Dancer	
2008	Camp Rock 2: The Final Jam	Troupe dancer	
2011-2012	Glee Live! In Concert!	Principal dancer	

=== Television ===
Television
Year	Title	Role	Notes
2009–2015	Glee	Principal dancer	
2010	82nd Academy Awards	Troupe Dancer	
2012	The Secret Life of the American Teenager	Dancer	Season 5 Episode 3 "I Do and I Don't"
2013	Bunheads	Dancer	Season 1 Episode 18 "Next!"
2016	Grease: Live	Troupe Dancer	

=== Music Videos ===
Music Videos
Year	Artist	Title	Notes
2010	Chelsea Williams	Eight Days	
2012	Gloria Estefan	Hotel Nacional	
2012	Twin Shadow	Patient	
2014	Zak Waters	Over You	
