= In the Presence of the Enemy =

Crime novel by Elizabeth George

- First UK edition
- Author: Elizabeth George
- Series: Inspector Lynley
- Genre: Crime novel
- Publisher: Bantam Books
- Publication date: 1996
- Publication place: United States
- Media type: Print (hardcover, paperback)
- ISBN: 9780553092653 (first)
- Preceded by: Playing for the Ashes
- Followed by: Deception on His Mind

In the Presence of the Enemy is a crime novel by Elizabeth George.

== Plot ==
Dennis Luxford, the editor of a Tory newspaper, once had a brief affair with young reporter Eve Bowen, who, eleven years later, is now an up-and-coming Tory MP. Since then, Eve has married, and has refused all contact with Luxford, nor has she ever acknowledged him as the father of her daughter, Charlotte.

When Charlotte is kidnapped, Luxford, who is now also married and father to a young child, is ordered to acknowledge Charlotte as his daughter on the front page of his newspaper, or face terrible consequences. Eve, who believes Bowen to have fabricated the situation, refuses to call in the police. The story goes unpublished, and some time later, Charlotte's body is discovered in a Wiltshire waterway.

As Sergeant Barbara Havers is dispatched to the scene, a renewed demand is made by the murderer, with the life of another innocent at stake.

== Reception ==
Kirkus Reviews commented negatively on the novel's length and "unconvincing and off-the-wall plot", whilst praising the author's storytelling skills. However, Publishers Weekly awarded it a starred review, and praised the "fully developed characters" and "electrifying and astonishing conclusion."
