= Bozenna Intrator =

American writer

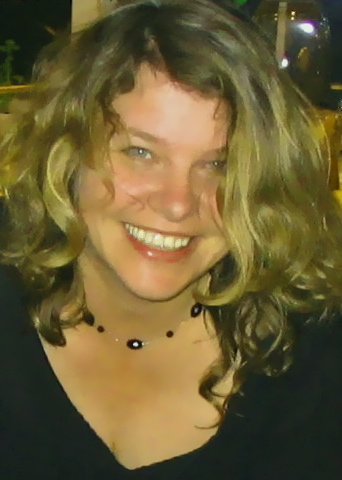
- Bozenna Intrator (2006)
- Born: 1964 (age 61–62)
- Occupation: Writer

Bozenna Intrator (born 1964, also Bozena Intrator Bożena Wnukowska) is a Polish-American writer, lyricist and translator.

== Biography ==
Intrator studied at the University of Warsaw, the University of Vienna, and the University of Southern California. In 1990, she graduated from the New York University with a Master's degree in Philosophy.

She has worked on various film and advertising projects in New York, Paris, Vienna and Warsaw, published poems and stories in literary magazines in Austria, Poland and in USA: Die Presse (Austria), Rzeczpospolita (Poland), Gutenberg (Poland). Songs of various vocalists were recorded with her lyrics. She's also written screenplays, poems, stories, novels, plays, of translations and adaptations of poems, plays and screenplays as well as photographs and paintings. She writes in three languages: German, Polish and English. She is a member of ZAiKS.

== Works ==
=== Prose ===
- Poetry collection: Szepczac-Geflüster, published by Wydawnictwo Edukacyjne, Poland, 1999 (in Polish and German)
- Poetry collection + CD: „So nahe und so weit – Tak blisko i tak daleko“, published by Akademia Wilanowska, Poland, 2006 (PL, DE)
- Poems and poem translations in anthologies:
  - Moderne Polnische Lyrik (Modern Polish Poetry)
  - Moderne Österreichische Lyrik (Modern Austrian Poetry), published by Wydawnictwo Edukacyjne, Poland, 1998 (in Polish and German)
  - Auschwitz Gedichte (Auschwitz poems)
  - Na mojej ziemi był Oświęcim (Auschwitz was in my homeland)
- Novel: Luft nur (Air only), published by Röschnarr Verlag, Austria, 1995
- Prose and poetry in various literary magazines

=== Screenplays ===
- English Versions of Polish screenplays: Little Caroline and A Dalmatians point of view (TV-Serie for children), Balladyna aka "The Bait" (2000) with Faye Dunaway
  - I'll Find You aka Music, War and Love - with David S. Ward
  - So nahe und so weit
  - Hela w opalach – the Polish Adaptation of the American comedy TV Series Grace Under Fire

=== Plays ===
- translations form German into Polish:
  - Tee in Richmond, (Esther Vilar), together with Grazyna Dylag, also for TVP Theater (director: Zbigniew Zapasiewicz)
  - Eifersucht, (Esther Vilar), also for TVP Theater (director: Krystyna Janda)
  - Strategie der Schmetterlinge, (Esther Vilar)
  - Moskito, (Esther Vilar)
  - „Alt heißt schön“, (Esther Vilar)
- Plays – translations from English into Polish:
  - “Fully committed“ by Becky Mode (translation and adaptation)
- Plays:
  - Praktyka wzglednosci (Relativity in Practice)
  - So nahe und so weit (it started with a dream)
  - Unser Hainzelmännchen (Our little dwarf)
  - Zwischen Ende und Anfang (Between the end and the beginning)
  - Talk to you on Facebook (written in English)
  - Schmetterlinge waren früher (Butterflies were earlier)
  - Third time is a charm (written in English)

=== Song lyrics in films and on various records ===
  - Bardzo kochać chcemy – a song in the film "Wojna żeńsko-męska" (2011)
  - „A Kto wie” is since 2000 the most often played Christmas song in Poland – in the film Świąteczna Przygoda / A Very Christmas Story and on the CD with the same title;
  - in the Polish version of the animated film Titanic: The Legend Goes On – songs "impreza u psa" performed by Borys Szyc and "ciagle śniłam" performed by Izabela Trojanowska
  - on the CD "Piątki na piątki" published by Radio Z
  - on the CD "Marzenia się spełniają” – performed by Majka Jeżowska
  - on the CD Hania Stach, Pomaton EMI Poland (clip and single: Właśnie w taki dzień, single: Gdy cię nie ma obok mnie) and 4 other songs
  - on the CD “Moda” by Hania Stach 2013
  - "it's not a game" (clip and single) performed by Urban Noiz in the finals of the Eurovision Song Contest in Poland
  - "It feels so right" – the December 2008 winner in the American contest Song of the Year
  - "Lody lila i różowe" – performed by Majka Jeżowska – in the TV and Radio ad campaign for Coral ice cream
  - radio single "taka jasna" – performed by Krzysztof Kiljanski
  - on the CD "FIVE" (2010) – performed by Izabela Kopeć (the first single and clip: I am singing for you)
  - in the film “Balladyna / The Bait” (2009) – with Sonia Bohosiewicz, Mirosław Baka and Faye Dunaway
  - I am singing for you – in the film "15 fotografii“ (2010) by Izabela Kopec
  - "Life tastes great – serdeczności" – in the TV campaign for Hochland – 2013
