= Just One Evil Act =

2013 novel by Elizabeth George

- First UK edition
- Author: Elizabeth George
- Series: Inspector Lynley
- Genre: Crime novel
- Publisher: Dutton (US); Hodder & Stoughton (UK)
- Publication date: 2013
- Publication place: United States
- Media type: Print (hardcover, paperback)
- ISBN: 9781444706000 (first)
- Preceded by: Believing The Lie
- Followed by: A Banquet of Consequences

Just One Evil Act is a crime novel by Elizabeth George. It is the 18th book in the author's Inspector Lynley series, and once again features the character of Detective Barbara Havers.

It also exists as an audiobook, narrated by Davina Porter.

== Plot ==
Just One Evil Act begins with the sudden disappearance of the nine-year-old daughter of Taymullah Azhar, a friend of Detective Havers. We learn that the child, Hadiyyah, has been apparently taken to Tuscany by her mother, Angelina, who no longer lives with Azhar.

Azhar is distraught, but because he and Angelina were not married, he has no legal claim over their daughter. However, when Angelina returns to London with the news that Hadiyyah is missing, suspicion falls on Azhar himself as the potential kidnapper.

Havers involves Inspector Lynley in the case, and defying orders not to get involved herself, follows him to Tuscany, where most of the action is set. Though the child is eventually discovered unharmed, her mother is then found murdered, and Azhar is once more a suspect. There follows a complicated series of twists and revelations, during which Havers attempts to manipulate the tabloid media in favour of her friend, while coming to terms with the possibility that Azhar may not be as innocent as she believes.

== Reception ==
Although it reached first place on the 2013 best sellers list of The New York Times, the book received mixed reviews, with reviewers commenting on its length, although Kirkus Reviews also said: "George is a master of the wily plot and the timely tossed out red herring."
