= Anthony McCarten =

New Zealand writer (born 1961)

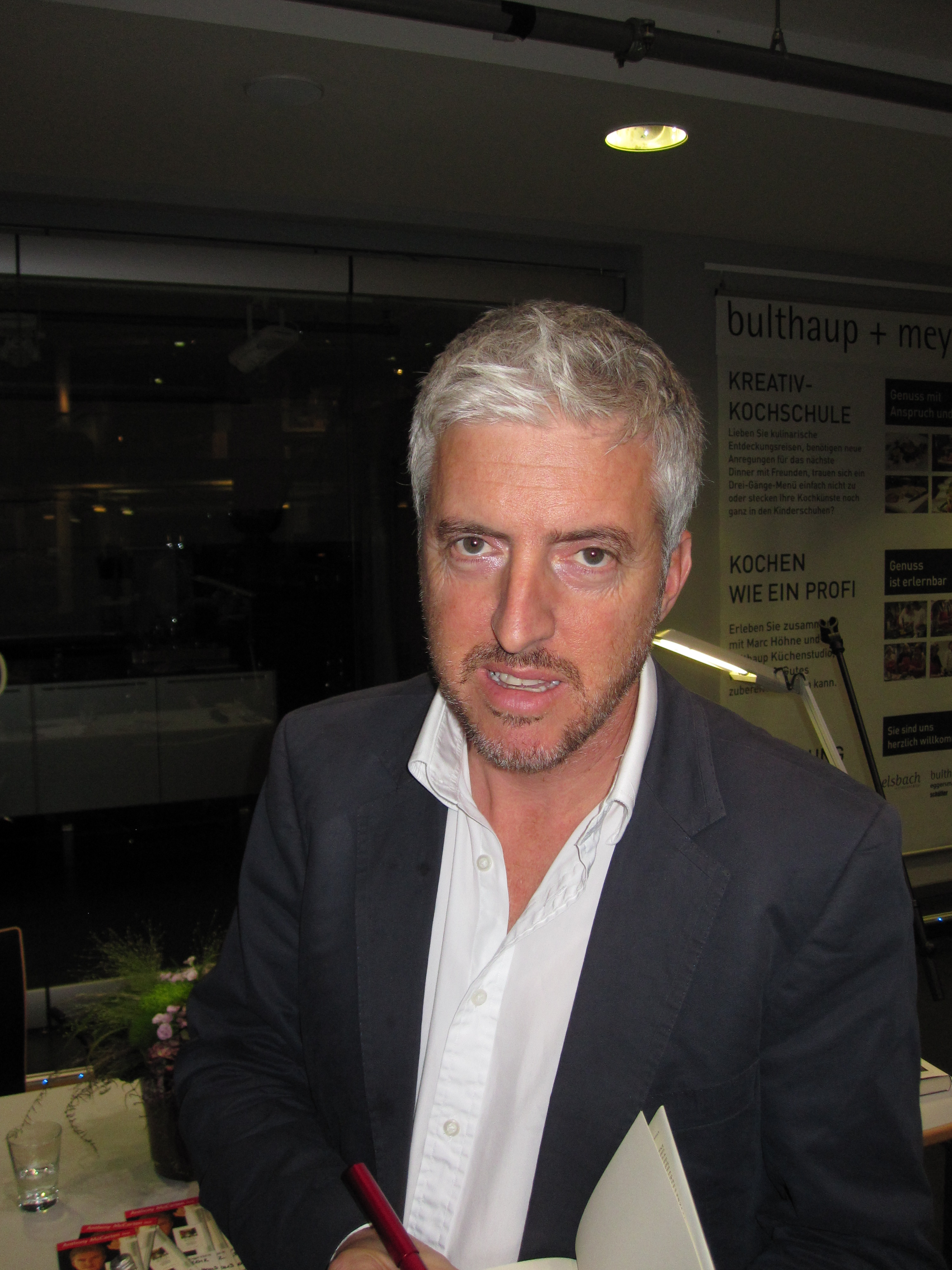
- Anthony McCarten in 2012
- Born: 28 April 1961 (age 65); New Plymouth, New Zealand
- Education: Massey University; Victoria University of Wellington
- Occupations: Screenwriter; novelist; playwright; journalist; film director; film producer

Anthony McCarten (born 28 April 1961) is a New Zealand writer and filmmaker. He is best known for writing big-budget biopics The Theory of Everything (2014), Darkest Hour (2017), Bohemian Rhapsody (2018), The Two Popes (2019), and Whitney Houston: I Wanna Dance with Somebody (2022). McCarten has been nominated for four Academy Awards, including twice for Best Adapted Screenplay, for The Theory of Everything and The Two Popes.

== Early life ==
McCarten was born and raised in New Plymouth, New Zealand, and attended Francis Douglas Memorial College. He worked as a reporter for a couple of years on The Taranaki Herald before studying for an Arts degree at Massey University and Victoria University of Wellington, where he studied creative writing with Bill Manhire. After leaving university, McCarten appeared in a production of King Lear.

== Career ==
=== Novels ===
McCarten is the author of ten novels. McCarten's novels have been translated into 26 languages. His first novel, Spinners (Picador, 2000), was voted one of the top ten novels of that year by Esquire magazine. McCarten published his second novel, The English Harem, in 2002, which he later adapted for the screen. It was broadcast on ITV in December 2005.

In 2007, he wrote his third novel Death of a Superhero, then adapted the screenplay, executive produced the film, and wrote the book of the stage musical. It won the 2008 Austrian Youth Literature Prize and was a finalist for the 2008 German Youth Literature Prize. His fourth novel, Show Of Hands, was published in Europe, and in the US by Simon and Schuster in 2009. McCarten directed the big screen adaptation and the movie had its world premiere at the Montreal World Film Festival, 2008, and was nominated for Best Picture and Best Director at the New Zealand Film Awards. The sequel novel to Death of a Superhero, In The Absence Of Heroes, was published in 2012, and was a finalist for the 2013 New Zealand Fiction Prize and was longlisted for the 2014 Dublin International IMPAC Literary Award. In 2013 McCarten published Brilliance, about Thomas Edison, and his friendship with J.P. Morgan. In 2015 he was inducted as a Literary Fellow of the New Zealand Society of Authors. Going Zero, his 2023 thriller, was published in 23 languages.

In 2017 McCarten's work of historical non-fiction, Darkest Hour: How Churchill Brought Us Back From The Brink was published, became a Sunday Times Number 1 Bestseller, and later was turned into a biopic.

=== Screenwriting ===
Via Satellite, which McCarten adapted from his own stage play, and directed himself, was invited to several film festivals including London, Cannes, Toronto, Melbourne, Hawaii and Seattle. His follow-up feature as writer/director, Show of Hands (2008), premiered at the Montreal International Film Festival and was an official selection for the Shanghai Film Festival 2009.

In 2011, his adaptation of his own novel Death of a Superhero had its world premiere at the Toronto Film Festival, won the 2011 Les Arcs Film Festival Audience Choice Prize and Young Jury Prize, and the Audience Award and 'Special Mention' of the Jury at the Mamer-en-Mars European Film Festival. It had its US premiere at the 2012 Tribeca Film Festival.

McCarten produced and wrote The Theory of Everything (2014), concerning the life of Prof. Stephen Hawking, and his first wife, Jane Hawking. He first initiated talks with Jane to acquire the rights to her autobiography, Travelling to Infinity, in 2004, and shortly after began work on the screenplay, which took its inspiration from her book. On 15 January 2015, the film received 5 Academy Award nominations, with McCarten earning two as producer and screenwriter in the categories of Best Picture and Best Adapted Screenplay. He won two BAFTA awards for his roles as producer Best British Film and screenwriter Best Adapted Screenplay.

In 2017, McCarten wrote and co-produced a film about Winston Churchill, Darkest Hour. It stars Gary Oldman as Churchill, who has received critical acclaim for his performance. The film received 6 Academy Award nominations, with McCarten earning one as producer in the category of Best Picture. He was also nominated for two BAFTA awards for his role as producer, Best British Film and Best Film.

McCarten wrote Bohemian Rhapsody (2018), the Queen biopic that reached Number 1 at the box office in the US, UK, France, Germany, and all major markets, recording the second biggest opening weekend in history for a musical biography. It became the biggest grossing drama and/or biopic of all time in 2018, winning the 2019 Golden Globe for Best Picture (drama), earning over $900 million at the box office, and was nominated for the 2019 Academy Award for Best Picture.

In 2019, he wrote the script for The Two Popes, the film adaptation of his own stage play, The Pope; the film stars Anthony Hopkins as Pope Benedict XVI and Jonathan Pryce as Pope Francis, and had its world premiere at the Telluride Film Festival.

In April 2020, Deadline.com announced McCarten would be writing the screenplay for an upcoming Whitney Houston biopic. He would also serve as producer with Houston's mentor/boss Clive Davis, her estate president and music company Primary Wave. Stella Meghie was set to direct the film, Whitney Houston: I Wanna Dance with Somebody. In September 2021, director Kasi Lemmons was brought on to replace Meghie. Production started shortly afterwards at Marina Studios' soundstages in Quincy, Massachusetts.

In 2026, he wrote and directed the political thriller The Price Of Peace.

=== Theatre ===
McCarten received early international success with his play Ladies Night. McCarten has written the book for A Beautiful Noise, a Broadway musical about Neil Diamond which premiered in New York in December 2022. He is also the author of the plays The Collaboration and The Pope (AKAThe Two Popes)

== Personal life ==
McCarten divides his time between London, Los Angeles and Munich. He has three children.

== Selected works ==
Films

Year	Title	Director	Writer	Producer
1999	Via Satellite	Yes	Yes	No
2008	Show of Hands	Yes	Yes	No
2011	Death of a Superhero	No	Yes	Executive
2014	The Theory of Everything	No	Yes	Yes
2017	Darkest Hour	No	Yes	Yes
2018	Bohemian Rhapsody	No	Yes	No
2019	The Two Popes	No	Yes	No
2022	Whitney Houston: I Wanna Dance with Somebody	No	Yes	Yes
2024	The Collaboration	No	Yes	Yes
2026	The Price of Peace	Yes	Yes	Yes

Television

Year	Title	Notes
1989	Worzel Gummidge Down Under	4 episodes
2005	The English Harem	TV movie

Theatre

Year	Title	Venue	Notes
1984	Invitation to a Second Class Carriage	Depot Theatre, Wellington	
1987	Yellow Canary Mazurka		
1987	Ladies Night	Mercury	With Stephen Sinclair
1988, 1989	Pigeon English	Playwrights' Workshop / Depot	
1990	Weed		
1991	Via Satellite	Wellington Theatre Critics	
1992	Hang on a Minute, Mate	Downstage	
1992	Ladies' Night 2	Mercury	With Stephen Sinclair
1995	FILTH (Failed in London, Try Hong Kong)	Circa	
1996	Four Cities	Los Angeles	AKA Continental Breakfast
2014	Death of a Superhero		book by McCarten, music by Paul Brown
2017	The Pope	Royal and Derngate Theatre, Northampton	AKA The Two Popes
2022	The Collaboration	London/Broadway	
2022	A Beautiful Noise	Boston/Broadway	book by McCarten, music by Neil Diamond
2026	Money To Burn		

== Awards and nominations ==
Year	Award	Category	Title	Result
2014	Academy Awards	Best Picture	The Theory of Everything	Nominated
2014	Academy Awards	Best Adapted Screenplay	The Theory of Everything	Nominated
2017	Academy Awards	Best Picture	Darkest Hour	Nominated
2019	Academy Awards	Best Adapted Screenplay	The Two Popes	Nominated
2014	BAFTA Awards	Best Film	The Theory of Everything	Nominated
2014	BAFTA Awards	Best Adapted Screenplay	The Theory of Everything	Won
2014	BAFTA Awards	Outstanding British Film	The Theory of Everything	Won
2017	BAFTA Awards	Best Film	Darkest Hour	Nominated
2017	BAFTA Awards	Outstanding British Film	Darkest Hour	Nominated
2018	BAFTA Awards	Outstanding British Film	Bohemian Rhapsody	Nominated
2019	BAFTA Awards	Best Adapted Screenplay	The Two Popes	Nominated
2019	BAFTA Awards	Outstanding British Film	The Two Popes	Nominated
2019	Golden Globe Awards	Best Screenplay	The Two Popes	Nominated
2019	Hollywood Film Awards	Hollywood Screenwriter Award	The Two Popes	Won

== Bibliography ==
- Spinners Random House New Zealand (1999) Harper Perennial (US) (2001)
- The English Harem Picador (2002), reprinted (film-tie-in) Alma Books (2006)
- Brilliance (2006) Hawthorne Books (US), Alma Books (UK) Random House (NZ) Diogenes (Germany)
- Death of a Superhero (2006, 2007) Alma Books
- Show of Hands (2008) Diogenes (Germ.), Simon and Schuster (US), Random House (NZ)
- In the Absence of Heroes (2012) Random House (NZ), Diogenes (Germ.)
- funnygirl (2015) Alma Books (UK), Random House (NZ) Diogenes (Germany)
- Darkest Hour: How Churchill Brought Us Back from the Brink (2017) Penguin/Viking (UK), HarperCollins (US)
- The Pope: Francis, Benedict, and the Decision That Shook the World (2019) Flatiron Books (US)
- Going Zero (2023)
- Warren and Bill - Gates, Buffett and the Friendship that Changed the World. (2024) Harper Collins (US)
