= Common People (Black Mirror) =

- Black Mirror episode
- Promotional poster
- Episode no.: Series 7 Episode 1
- Directed by: Ally Pankiw
- Story by: Charlie Brooker; Bisha K. Ali
- Teleplay by: Charlie Brooker
- Cinematography by: Bobby Shore
- Editing by: Sarah Brewerton
- Original air date: 10 April 2025
- Running time: 58 minutes

Guest appearances
- Chris O'Dowd as Mike Waters; Rashida Jones as Amanda Waters; Tracee Ellis Ross as Gaynor

Episode chronology
← Previous "Demon 79"	Next → "Bête Noire"

"Common People" is the first episode in the seventh series of the British science fiction anthology television series Black Mirror. Written by Bisha K. Ali and series creator and showrunner Charlie Brooker and directed by Ally Pankiw, it premiered on Netflix on 10 April 2025, with the rest of series seven.

The story centers around a woman (Rashida Jones) who needs a subscription service to survive, the consequences she experiences as the price goes up and the quality declines, as well as the lengths her husband (Chris O'Dowd) is willing to go to in order to cover the cost of the service.

The episode received positive reviews from critics, with praise going towards the performances of the cast, the commentary and the ending.

== Plot ==
Welder Mike Waters (Chris O'Dowd) and schoolteacher Amanda (Rashida Jones) have been married for three years and are trying to conceive a baby. One day while teaching, Amanda collapses, and doctors discover she has an inoperable brain tumour. Mike is introduced to Gaynor (Tracee Ellis Ross), a representative from tech startup Rivermind Technologies. Gaynor explains that Rivermind can remove the tumour and replace her excised brain tissue with synthetic tissue powered by their servers. While the surgery is free, Mike agrees to pay a monthly subscription fee of $300 to give Amanda a chance at living a normal life again.

Initially the service seems to help Amanda, but as time passes they find that it has several limitations (such as a limited geographical area in which it works) which can only be bypassed by upgrading from their current "Common" tier to the costlier "Plus" tier, which costs an additional $500 a month. Unbeknownst to Amanda, she begins interjecting brief advertisements into her daily speech. Mike secretly pays for the upgrade by raising funds on "Dum Dummies", a trash streaming site where users take requests from viewers to perform humiliating tasks for payment. Mike initially performs these while wearing a mask to protect his identity, but reluctantly reveals his face briefly during a stunt to make a large sum of money. On their next anniversary, Mike buys a 12-hour "Lux" pass that allows users to access a new higher-level tier and manipulate their emotions and sensations via a connected app.

A co-worker discovers Mike's Dum Dummies livestreams and shares them at work. Mike attacks his colleague, who is then severely injured in an accident, leading to Mike being fired. Mike and Amanda plead with an unsympathetic Gaynor to be allowed extra time on Rivermind until Mike can get a new job. When Mike mentions that they are trying for a baby, Gaynor explains they would be charged an additional fee if Amanda were to become pregnant. Mike becomes furious and the couple dejectedly leave the office.

One year later, Amanda has returned to the Rivermind "Common" service, sleeping 16 hours a day and spouting ads when she is awake. Mike pays for 30 minutes of the premium Lux service, using it to boost Amanda's serenity, allowing her to calmly request that he end her life when she is "not here". After the time runs out, Mike suffocates Amanda when she blacks out to run an ad. Mike then walks into another room with Dum Dummies streaming live on his laptop, holding a box cutter in his hand.

== Production ==
=== Writing ===
"Common People" was written by Bisha K. Ali alongside series creator Charlie Brooker. Brooker originally conceived of the episode as a light, comedic episode that centered on someone needing a subscription service to remain alive. He got the idea from listening to a podcast in which the host broke from the story to deliver advertisements, then resumed telling the story.

"Common People" features several references to previous Black Mirror episodes including, "Joan Is Awful" and "San Junipero". Additionally, it also references other season seven episodes "Bête Noire" and "Hotel Reverie". The episode itself is referenced in "Bête Noire".

Brooker felt that the episode's ending was among the "bleakest" in Black Mirror. Rashida Jones said she found the ending "mean" upon her first read, but came to understand its reasoning, finding it an act of love where providing a death with dignity is preferable to seeing the other person living in pain.

=== Casting ===
"Common People" stars Jones, Chris O'Dowd, and Tracee Ellis Ross. Ross and Jones were old friends and enjoyed working on the episode together. Ross and Jones both agreed to star in the episode before knowing anything about the storyline. Jones had previously co-written the season 3 episode "Nosedive".

== Release ==
Ross spoke with comedian Seth Meyers on Late Night with Seth Meyers about the episode.

=== Critical reception ===
The episode received generally positive reviews. On the review aggregator website Rotten Tomatoes, 80% of 10 critics' reviews are positive, with an average rating of 5.6/10. Louisa Mellor of Den of Geek rated the episode 3 out of 5 stars. Proma Khosla of Mashable considered the episode the second most pessimistic of the show, behind only "The Waldo Moment", describing it as "a nightmare that seems terrifyingly possible" regarding capitalism using technology to make life worse.

Vulture's Ben Rosenstock disliked the episode, criticizing it as "jumbled on a tonal, narrative, and thematic level".

Netflix submitted Jones, O'Dowd, and Ross to be considered for the 77th Primetime Emmy Awards. The episode received two Emmy nominations: one for Jones as Outstanding Lead Actress in a Limited or Anthology Series or Movie, and one for Brooker and Ali for Outstanding Writing for a Limited or Anthology Series or Movie.

=== Episode rankings ===
"Common People" ranked average on critics' lists of the 34 instalments of Black Mirror, from best to worst:

- 8th – James Hibbs, Radio Times
- 9th – Jackie Strause and James Hibberd, The Hollywood Reporter
- 12th – James Hibberd, Christian Holub, and Randall Colburn, Entertainment Weekly
- 16th – Charles Bramesco, Vulture
- 21st – Lucy Ford, Jack King and Brit Dawson, GQ
- 28th – Ed Power, The Daily Telegraph

IndieWire listed the 33 episodes, excluding Bandersnatch, where "Common People" placed 21st. Wired rated it second-best of the six episodes in series seven. Instead of by quality, Mashable ranked the episodes by tone, concluding that "Common People" was the second-most pessimistic episode of the show.
