= A Great Deliverance =

1988 book by Elizabeth George

- First edition
- Author: Elizabeth George
- Genre: Mystery fiction, Crime
- Published: 1988
- Publisher: Bantam Books
- Pages: 413
- Awards: Anthony Award for Best First Novel (1989)
- ISBN: 978-0-553-27802-6
- Website: A Great Deliverance

A Great Deliverance (ISBN 978-0-553-27802-6) is a book written by Elizabeth George and published by Bantam Books (now owned by Random House) on 1 May 1988.

It is George's first novel, and the first in her detective series featuring Inspector Lynley and Detective Barbara Havers of Scotland Yard.

== Plot ==
Detective Inspector Lynley and his sidekick Detective Sergeant Havers are called to the Yorkshire village of Keldale to investigate the beheading of William Teys, a local farmer. The case seems straightforward: the victim's daughter has already confessed to the murder, having been found by the body with an axe before lapsing into a catatonic state.

However, Lynley and Havers soon discover that the seemingly quiet village is riddled with secrets and subterfuge. The investigation uncovers a dark tale of abuse, seduction, and toxic family relationships within the small community.

We also follow the development of the professional relationship between the two very different protagonists. Lynley is wealthy and privileged; Havers is from a working-class background, and initially resents her senior officer's charm and good looks. However, as the case progresses the two detectives are able to find common ground, and Havers' initial dislike of Lynley is found to be largely due to her own insecurities and prejudice.

== Reception ==
The novel was largely well-received, with critics commenting on the protagonist's appeal and the "brilliantly drawn" characters. Kirkus Reviews described it as: "a marvelous book and a searing debut," although Publishers Weekly was less fulsome, commenting that: "George too often plays to the gallery with characterizations broad enough to border on caricature."

It won the Anthony Award for Best First Novel in 1989, as well as the 1989 Agatha Award and the 1990 French Grand Prix de Littérature Policière.
