= Leo Suter =

English actor (born 1993)

- Suter at the 2026 BFI London Film Festival
- Born: 26 September 1993 (age 33); London, United Kingdom
- Education: St Paul's School; New College, Oxford
- Occupation: Actor
- Years active: 2012–present
- Spouse: Haylee Roderick (m. 2023)

Leo Suter (born 26 September 1993) is an English actor. On television, he is known for his roles in the ITV series Victoria (2017), Beecham House and Sanditon (both 2019), the BBC series Clique (2018) and Lynley (2026), and the Netflix series Vikings: Valhalla (2022–2024). His films include I'll Find You (2019) and Widow Clicquot (2023).

== Early life and education ==
Suter was born in London, son of media executive Tim Suter and businesswoman Dame Helen Alexander, later chair of UBM plc and chancellor of the University of Southampton. He was educated at Colet Court, St Paul's School, and New College, Oxford, where he read Human Sciences.

== Career ==
Suter began acting while studying in school at the age of eleven. He signed his first professional acting contract after performing in his school final play. His theatre roles included Patsy in The Winterling by Oxford Playhouse, Subtle in The Alchemist by Arcola Theatre, and Mercutio in Romeo and Juliet by Southwark Playhouse.

From 2022 to 2024, Suter starred as Harald Sigurdsson in the Netflix series Vikings: Valhalla (2022–2024), directed by Jeb Stuart.

In 2025, he starred as DI Tommy Lynley in the BBC reboot Lynley. The series was premiered on Britbox, before being broadcast on BBC One in January 2026.

== Filmography ==
=== Films ===
Year	Title	Role	Notes	Ref.
2013	Round and Round the Garden	Gardener		
2014	Maleficent	Young Man	Uncredited	
2016	Fallen	Trevor Beckman		
2019	I'll Find You	Robert Pulaski		
2023	Widow Clicquot	George		
2025	Christmas Karma	Bob Crachit		
2026	The Face of Horror	Richard York		

=== Television ===
Year	Title	Role	Notes	Ref.
2012	Bad Education	Posh Pupil	1 episode	
2017	Victoria	Edward Drummond	8 episodes	
2017	Ransom	Simon Holman	Episode: "The Castle"	
2018	Clique	Jack Yorke	6 episodes	
2019	Beecham House	Daniel Beecham	6 episodes	
2019	Sanditon	Young Stringer	8 episodes	
2020	Intelligence	Tom Austin	Episode #1.4	
2020	The Liberator	Captain Bill Lauder	Episode: "The Enemy"	
2022–2024	Vikings: Valhalla	Harald Hardrada	3 Series	
2025	Lynley	DI Tommy Lynley	1 Series	
