= Well-Schooled in Murder =

1990 novel by Elizabeth George

- First US edition
- Author: Elizabeth George
- Series: Inspector Lynley
- Genre: Crime novel
- Publisher: Bantam Books
- Publication date: 25 October 1990
- Publication place: United States
- Media type: Print (hardcover, paperback)
- Pages: 329 pp (first ed., hardcover)
- ISBN: 0-593-01973-3 (first)
- OCLC: 220789038
- LC Class: PS3557.E478 W4 1990
- Preceded by: Payment in Blood
- Followed by: A Suitable Vengeance

Well-Schooled in Murder is a crime novel by Elizabeth George, published by Bantam in 1990. It was the third book in her Inspector Lynley series, the first of which was A Great Deliverance (1988). In 2002 a screen adaptation was broadcast as the first episode of season one in The Inspector Lynley Mysteries, a BBC TV series.

== Plot summary ==
Set in the late 1980s at an elite public school in the South of England, the plot revolves around a strict yet unwritten code of behaviour which dictates that under no circumstances must pupils ever tell on their schoolmates, no matter what they have done.

Accordingly, when 13-year-old Matthew Whateley goes missing one Friday afternoon, and two days later is found dead in a churchyard an hour's drive away, Detective Inspector Thomas Lynley and his partner, Detective Sergeant Barbara Havers, both of the Criminal Investigation Department of New Scotland Yard, find themselves up against a wall of silence as none of the 600 pupils of Bredgar Chambers School seems to be willing to co-operate with the police and communicate what they know.

Piecing together the events of the victim's last days, Lynley and Havers find a letter from Matthew to Jeannie Bonnamy, the daughter of local resident Colonel Bonnamy, with whom Matthew had dinner three days before his disappearance. When Jeannie brings Matthew back to school, they see 6th- form student Chas Quilter in a school minibus, returning from a visit to Cecilia Feld, a girl in Stoke Poges. Chas is hiding his relationship with Cecilia, who has a child by him.

There follows a string of revelations and incidents among the staff of Bredgar Chambers. Chemistry teacher Emilia Bond, who is in love with colleague John Corntel, discovers that he is collecting child pornography, and tries to dispose of the evidence. We find out that 6th-former Clive Pritchard was tormenting Matthew Whateley, because Matthew had made a tape recording of Clive bullying another schoolboy. Someone attempts to kill Jeannie Bonnamy. Chas Quilter hangs himself.

The investigators find out that Matthew was adopted by the Whateleys. His biological parents were Pamela Byrne, the wife of one of the school's Board of Governors, and Edward Hsu, a former pupil who killed himself after the affair was revealed. Giles Byrne, Pamela's husband, feeling partly responsible for the death of Hsu, obtains a scholarship for Matthew at Bredgar Chambers.

Finally, the investigation turns to a number of sixth-form boys. Brian Byrne, the 18-year-old son of Giles Byrne, is revealed as the person behind the attack on Jeannie Bonamy. Clive Pritchard, who was tormenting Matthew, is revealed to have tied Matthew up to torment and intimidate him the night Matthew disappeared, and finding him dead, assumed he was responsible. In fact, Brian Byrne, who knew that Matthew had recordings of boys being tortured by sixth-formers and wanted to suppress this evidence, had killed Matthew with carbon monoxide, using the fume cupboard in the chemistry lab, leaving him for Pritchard to find. He and Chas Quilter - who Brian was blackmailing - then transported the body to the graveyard in Stoke Poges in the school minibus.

In the wake of these revelations, Brian Byrne and Clive Pritchard are arrested.

In a subplot Barbara Havers visits her mother, who is suffering from dementia, and finds her father dead. Another ongoing plot strand concerns Lynley's aristocratic descent (he is sometimes referred to as "Lord Asherton")—shown through his working relationship with his working class colleague Barbara Havers and his unrequited love for Deborah, his best friend's wife.

== Characters ==
- DI Thomas Lynley
- DS Barbara Havers
- Jimmy Havers: Barbara's father
- Mrs Havers: Barbara's mother
- Deborah St James: Simon's wife, with whom Lynley is secretly in love
- Matthew Whateley: 13-year-old schoolboy
- Kevin Whateley: Matthew's adoptive father
- Patsy Whateley: Matthew's adoptive mother
- Chas Quilter: 6th former
- Clive Pritchard: 6th former
- Brian Byrne: 6th former
- Giles Byrne: Brian's biological father
- Mrs Pamela Byrne: Brian's mother (deceased)
- John Corntel: teacher, former Eton schoolmate of Lynley
- Emilia Bond: chemistry teacher, in love with Corntel
- Colonel Bonnamy: lives in the neighbourhood of the school
- Jeannie Bonnamy: Colonel's daughter
- Cecilia Feld: 17-year-old girl in Stoke Poges
- Edward Hsu: former pupil who killed himself

== Reception ==
The Baltimore Sun wrote: "Ms. George has crafted a fine and powerful novel sure to delight readers in the mood for a thought-provoking, hard-hitting mystery."

People wrote: "Like P. D. James, George knows the import of the smallest human gesture; Well-Schooled in Murder puts the younger author clearly in the running with the genre's master."

Kirkus Reviews called it: "Solid, fine-tuned writing."

Well-Schooled in Murder was awarded the MIMI, a German prize for suspense fiction.

== TV adaptation ==
Well Schooled in Murder was adapted and broadcast by the BBC in April 2002 as the first episode of season one in The Inspector Lynley Mysteries, following a 2001 pilot based on the inaugural Lynley novel A Great Deliverance. Several changes were made to the plot. Matthew's biological mother is Patsy Whateley instead of Pamela Byrne. Corntel is gay but doesn't actually collect child porn. Deborah and Simon St James are omitted. So is Cecilia Feld, and there's no mention of Chas Quilter having a child. Lorry driver Barry Summers is a new suspect.

== Publication ==
- 1990, UK, Bantam Press (ISBN 0-593-01973-3), Pub date 25 October 1990, hardback (First edition)
