= Sean Wing =

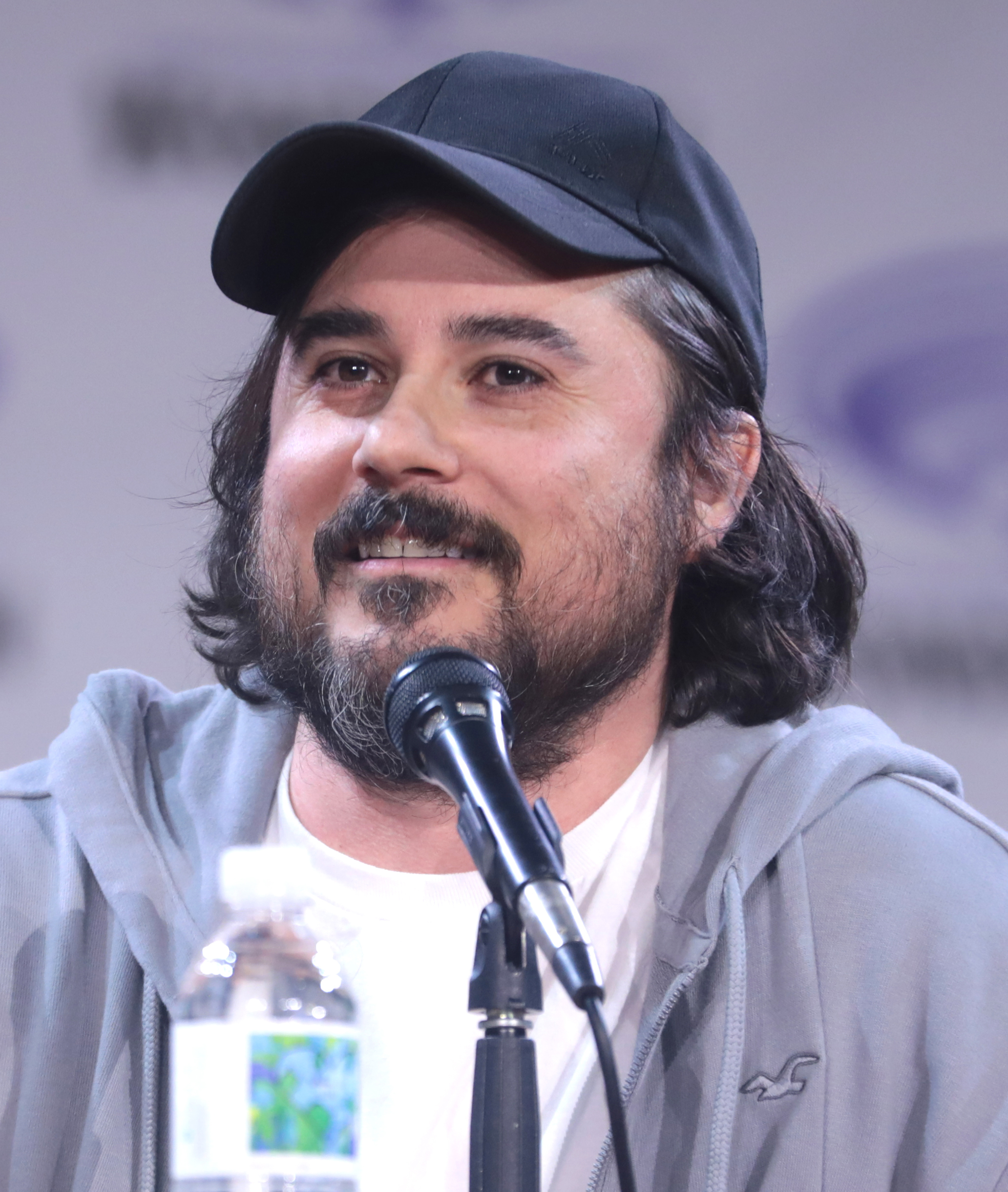
- Wing at the 2023 WonderCon

Background information
- Born: Sean Wing; July 10, 1982 (age 44)
- Origin: Las Vegas, Nevada, US
- Occupation: Actor
- Years active: 2000–present
- Website: Sean Wing at IMDb

Sean Wing (born July 10, 1982, in Las Vegas) is an American actor and singer whose first major appearance was on an episode of the CBS series Touched by an Angel. He may be best known for his roles as Glenn in the HBO comedy series Hello Ladies and Chad Griffin in the ABC series The Whole Truth.

== Career ==
In 1996, Wing was featured as "Student Host/Narrator" in "Mining for Music", a documentary short about mining processes by Lee Groberg.

In 2000, Wing appeared in a single episode of the CBS drama Touched by an Angel as Zack Collier. That was followed by a leading role in the TV series Beautiful People as Chris Prichett for ABC Family. He played Charlie in the 2010 romantic comedy film You Again co-starring Kristen Bell and Odette Yustman.

In 2010, he joined the lead cast of the ABC legal drama series The Whole Truth as Chad Griffin. The series was canceled after seven episodes aired and did not get renewed for a second season.

In 2010, Wing appeared in the Broadway production of Green Day's rock musical American Idiot.

In 2012 Wing was reported that he signed a contract to join the CW hit teen series 90210 playing Nick as a recurring character.

In 2013 joined the cast of Hello Ladies, the HBO comedy series by Stephen Merchant, as a recurring guest star, playing the character of Glenn the douchey agent.

In 2014, Wing appeared as Glenn in the Hello Ladies follow-up movie special on HBO.

In 2016, Wing wrote, produced and starred in the short film I Know Jake Gyllenhaal is Going to Fuck my Girlfriend

In 2016, he composed the score for and starred in "Fired on Mars" animation. Winner of Vimeo's Best of the Year

In 2018, Wing's short film I Know Jake Gyllenhaal is Going to Fuck my Girlfriend is selected one of the top ten short films of 2018 by filmshortage.com

In 2019, the short film A Play that Wing co-wrote, produced and starred in wins Mammoth Film Festival's Best Short Film and Best Writing

In 2019, he composed the music for and starred in "Wet City" on Adult Swim.

In 2023, Wing appeared as Brandon in the animated series "Fired on Mars" on HBO Max.

In 2025, he composed the music for and co-starred in the horror film "Appofeniacs."

== Filmography ==
Year	Film	Role	Other notes
2016	Fired on Mars	Jeff	Short Animation
2011	Red & Blue Marbles	Robert Lawson	Post production
2011	Fuzz Track City	Zack Lee	Post production
2010	You Again	Charlie Mason	Theatrical film
2009	Forget Me Not	T.J	Indie Horror film
2008	Munch	Boy on Date	Cameo role; uncredited
2008	The Attendant's Tip	John Meyer	Indie film
2007	Ten Inch Hero	Tad	Indie film
2006	Green Season	Man	Indie film
2006	Darkworld	Brian	Theatrical film
2004	In the Dark	Reese Gentry	Theatrical film
1996	Mining for Music	Student Host/Narrator	Educational documentary

== Television ==
Year	Series	Role	Other notes
2019	Wet City	Danny	Voice
2013	Hello Ladies	Glenn	Recurring
2011	90210	Nick	Recurring
2010	The Whole Truth	Chad Griffin	Series regular; canceled
2010	Lie on Me	Devil	1 episode; "Hold-on-U"
2009	Melrose Place	Levi Foster	1 episode; "June"
2009	NCIS: Los Angeles	Ted Brock	1 episode; "Random on Purpose"
2009	Drop Dead Diva	Charlie Tharpe	1 episode; "Crazy"
2009	10 Things I Hate About You	Mr. Liam Ross	1 episode; "Don't Give a Damn About My Bad Reputation"
2007–2008	South of Nowhere	Ethan Marks	Recurring; "Spencer's 18th Birthday"; "Career Day"; "Saturday Night Is for Fighting"
2008	Moonlight	Scott Walsh	1 episode; "Click"
2008	Medium		1 episode; "After Taste"
2007	Journeyman	Sammy	1 episode; "Winterland"
2007	Cold Case	Vince Patrielli	1 episode; "Running Around"
2007	What About Brian	Seven	1 episode; "What About Secrets"
2006	Beautiful People	Chris Pritchett	Series regular
2000	Touched by an Angel	Zack Collier	1 Episode; "Reasonable Doubt"
