= Kimberly Huie =

Canadian actress

Kimbery Huie
- Born: Kingston, Jamaica
- Education: University of Toronto (BA)
- Occupation: Actress

Kimberly Huie is a Jamaican-Canadian actress, best known for her lead roles in the television series Liberty Street and G-Spot.

== Early life and education ==
Born in Kingston, Jamaica, she moved to Toronto, Ontario with her family at age five. Her father, Barry Huie, was an engineer and book importer, a founder of the Kingston College alumni association, and the cousin of Jamaican painter Albert Huie. She began acting in high school, but completed a degree in history and political science at the University of Toronto before pursuing a professional career as an actress.

== Career ==
Huie's other acting credits have included appearances in the television series E.N.G., Forever Knight, Andromeda, Philly, Beautiful People, Studio 60 on the Sunset Strip, Chicago Hope, Grey's Anatomy, Self Made, Rookie Blue, The Parker Andersons and Amelia Parker, and the films Wishmaster: The Prophecy Fulfilled, Hairshirt, Never Get Outta the Boat, Deep Impact, and Passenger Side.

She has also acted on stage. Prior to Liberty Street, her most noted role was in Urban Donnellys, a stage show she cocreated with a theatre collective that included Marium Carvell, George Chiang, Sonia Dhillon, David Fox, Kanika Kapoor, Greg Kramer, Jack Nicholsen, Jovanni Sy and Michael Waller. In 2013, she appeared in a production of Robert Chafe's play As Ever in Nova Scotia.

== Filmography ==
=== Film ===
Year	Title	Role	Notes
1998	Deep Impact	Wendy Mogel	
1998	Too Smooth	Kimberly	
2002	Wishmaster: The Prophecy Fulfilled	Tracy	
2002	Never Get Outta the Boat	Dana	
2009	Passenger Side	Laurie	
2023	Totally Killer	adult Lauren Creston	

=== Television ===
Year	Title	Role	Notes
1993	Class of '96	Sherry	Episode: "Educating David"
1993–1994	E.N.G.	Kim	7 episodes
1994, 1995	Forever Knight	Bridget Hellman	2 episodes
1994–1995	Liberty Street	Janet Beecher	26 episodes
1995	Falling for You	Betsy	Television film
1995	Catwalk	Lisa Slade	2 episodes
1995	Baywatch Nights	Reporter	Episode: "Deadly Vision"
1995	The Awakening	Secretary	Television film
1996	Homeboys in Outer Space	Trixie	Episode: "The Pleasure Planet Principle, or G Marks the Spot"
1996	F/X: The Series	Ass't Director	Episode: "F/X: The Illusion"
1996, 1997	Flipper	Barbara	2 episodes
1997	The Sentinel	Caitlin Rachins	Episode: "Dead Drop"
1997, 1998	Pensacola: Wings of Gold	Hallie / Hannah McCray	2 episodes
1998	Malcolm & Eddie	Cidnee	Episode: "A Decent Proposal"
1998	Mike Hammer, Private Eye	Andrea Truesdale	Episode: "Gone Fishin'"
1998	Chicago Hope	Very Attractive Nurse	Episode: "Wag the Doc"
1999	Vengeance Unlimited	Jackie Jackson	Episode: "Confidence"
1999	G vs E	Nisco	Episode: "Men Are from Mars, Women Are Evil"
2000	Any Day Now	Angela Portho	Episode: "Five Golden Rings"
2001	NYPD Blue	Tracie Thomas	Episode: "In the Still of the Night"
2001	Raising Dad	Hannah	Episode: "Pilot"
2001	Men, Women & Dogs	Deena	Episode: "Dog Day Afternoon and Night"
2001, 2002	Andromeda	Elssbett Mossadim	2 episodes
2001, 2002	Philly	A.D.A. Lorraine Glover	2 episodes
2003	CSI: Crime Scene Investigation	Lola Creighton	Episode: "Recipe for Murder"
2003	The Paradise Virus	Dr. Delia	Television film
2003	The Guardian	Carla Webb	Episode: "What It Means to You"
2005–2009	G-Spot	Roxy	24 episodes
2006	Beautiful People	Maddy Kinkaid	8 episodes
2006	Studio 60 on the Sunset Strip	Jane	Episode: "The Cold Open"
2007	'Til Death	Doctor	Episode: "The Tale of the Tape"
2007	More of Me	Ginni	Television film
2007	Grey's Anatomy	Mary Daltrey	2 episodes
2009	CSI: Miami	Molly	Episode: "Flight Risk"
2009	Saving Grace	Millicent	Episode: "But There's Clay"
2012	Alphas	Natalie Young	Episode: "Wake Up Call"
2013	Rookie Blue	Karen Beaton	Episode: "You Can See the Stars"
2013	Cracked	Maya Henson	Episode: "Hideaway"
2015	The Affair	Customer	Episode #2.42
2017	The Americans	Secretary	Episode: "The Committee on Human Rights"
2017	The Blacklist	Dana Isaacs	Episode: "The Endling (No. 44)"
2018	Blindspot	Dr. Elizabeth White	Episode: "Let It Go"
2020	Self Made	Margaret Washington	Episode: "Bootstraps"
2020	Tiny Pretty Things	Ms. Banks	Episode: "Corps"
2021	Private Eyes	Celine Porter	Episode: "Smoke Gets in Your Eyes"
2021	The Parker Andersons	Joy	5 episodes
2022	The Kings of Napa	Grace Dixon	5 episodes
2022	Good Sam	Tanya	Episode: "The Griffith Technique"
