= Sarah Foret =

American actress

- Born: Sarah Elizabeth Foret
- Occupation: Actress
- Years active: 2004–2013

Sarah Elizabeth Foret (née Foret) is a retired American actress. She is known for her role as Sophie Kerr in Beautiful People.

== Life and career ==
Her first on-screen appearance was a role as Tina Paulson in an episode of the police procedural television series CSI: NY.

In 2005, she joined the cast of the ABC Family show Beautiful People, as Sophie Kerr. She appeared in two 2006 films, Karla and Pope Dreams, and one 2008 film, American Crude. She also appeared in episodes of The Hard Times of RJ Berger and Zach Stone Is Gonna Be Famous, as well as the Criminal Minds episode, "Supply and Demand".

She had guest roles on the television shows Gilmore Girls (2004), Clubhouse (2005), Moonlight (2007) and The Mentalist (2009).

== Filmography ==
Year	Title	Role	Notes
2004	CSI: NY	Tina Paulson	Episode: "A Man a Mile"
2004	Gilmore Girls	Anna Fairchild	Episode: "But Not as Cute as Pushkin"
2005	Clubhouse	Lucy	Episode: "Old Timers Day"
2005–2006	Beautiful People	Sophie Kerr	16 episodes
2006	Karla	Kaitlyn Ross	
2006	Pope Dreams	Hannah	
2007	Moonlight	Audrey	Episode: "12:04 AM"
2008	American Crude	Tammy	
2009	The Mentalist	Sydney Hanson	Episode: "A Dozen Red Roses"
2009	Lost Dream	Molly	
2010	The Dead Sleep	Melanie Wells	
2010	86'd	Miranda	Episode: "The Applicant"
2011	The Hard Times of RJ Berger	Katie	Episodes: "Saving Dick", "Sex. Teen. Candles."
2011	Criminal Minds	Renee Matlin	Episode: "Supply & Demand"
2011	Marcy	Sarah	Episode: "Marcy Does an Acting Class"
2013	Down and Dangerous	Emma Tate	
2013	Zach Stone Is Gonna Be Famous	N/A	Episode: "Zach Stone Is Gonna Be the Zachelor"
