= Rome Italy Temple =

Temple of the Church of Jesus Christ of Latter-day Saints in Rome, Italy

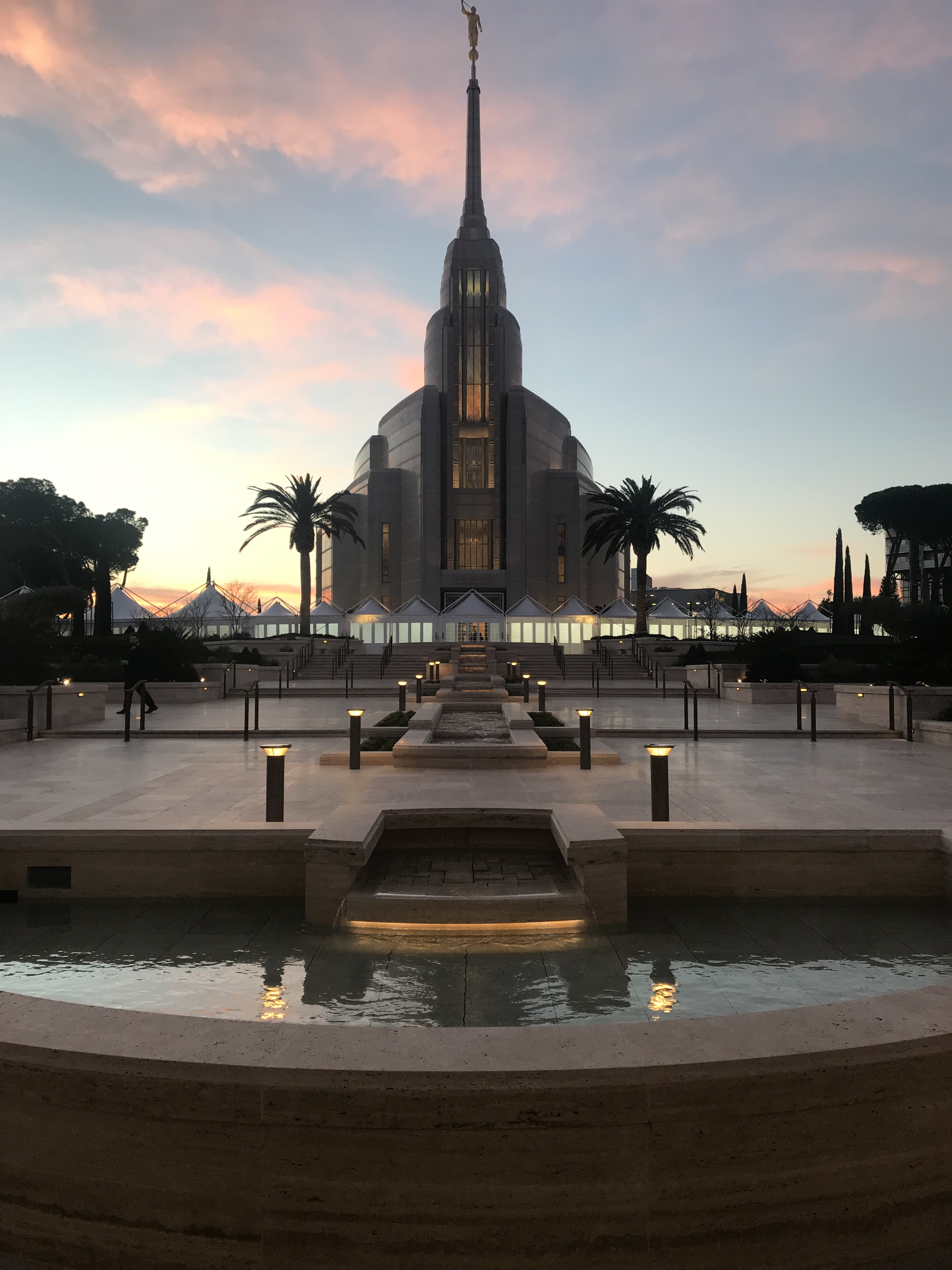
- Interactive map of Rome Italy Temple
- Number: 162
- Dedication: 10 March 2019, by Russell M. Nelson
- Site: 14.5 acres (5.9 ha)
- Floor area: 41,010 ft^{2} (3,810 m^{2})
- Height: 156.25 ft (47.63 m)
- Official website • News & images

Church chronology
← Barranquilla Colombia Temple	Rome Italy Temple	→ Kinshasa Democratic Republic of the Congo Temple

Additional information
- Announced: 4 October 2008, by Thomas S. Monson
- Groundbreaking: 23 October 2010, by Thomas S. Monson
- Open house: 28 January-16 February 2019
- Current president: Daniele Lui
- Location: Rome, Italy
- Coordinates: 41°58′14.2284″N 12°32′44.2752″E
- Exterior finish: Bianco Sardo Granite
- Baptistries: 1
- Ordinance rooms: 2
- Sealing rooms: 3
- Clothing rental: Yes
- Visitors' center: Yes

The Rome Italy Temple is a temple of the Church of Jesus Christ of Latter-day Saints in Rome, Italy. The temple serves church members in Italy, as well as Malta, Greece, Cyprus, Albania, Romania, and parts of the Middle East. Church president Thomas S. Monson announced the temple in 2008, the groundbreaking of the temple took place in 2010, and opened after its dedication in 2019. The temple is the first in Italy and the 162nd worldwide.

The temple has two attached end spires. This temple was designed by Neils Valentiner, using an architectural style reminiscent of Roman Catholic churches. A groundbreaking ceremony, to signify the beginning of construction, was held on October 23, 2010, conducted by Monson.

== History ==
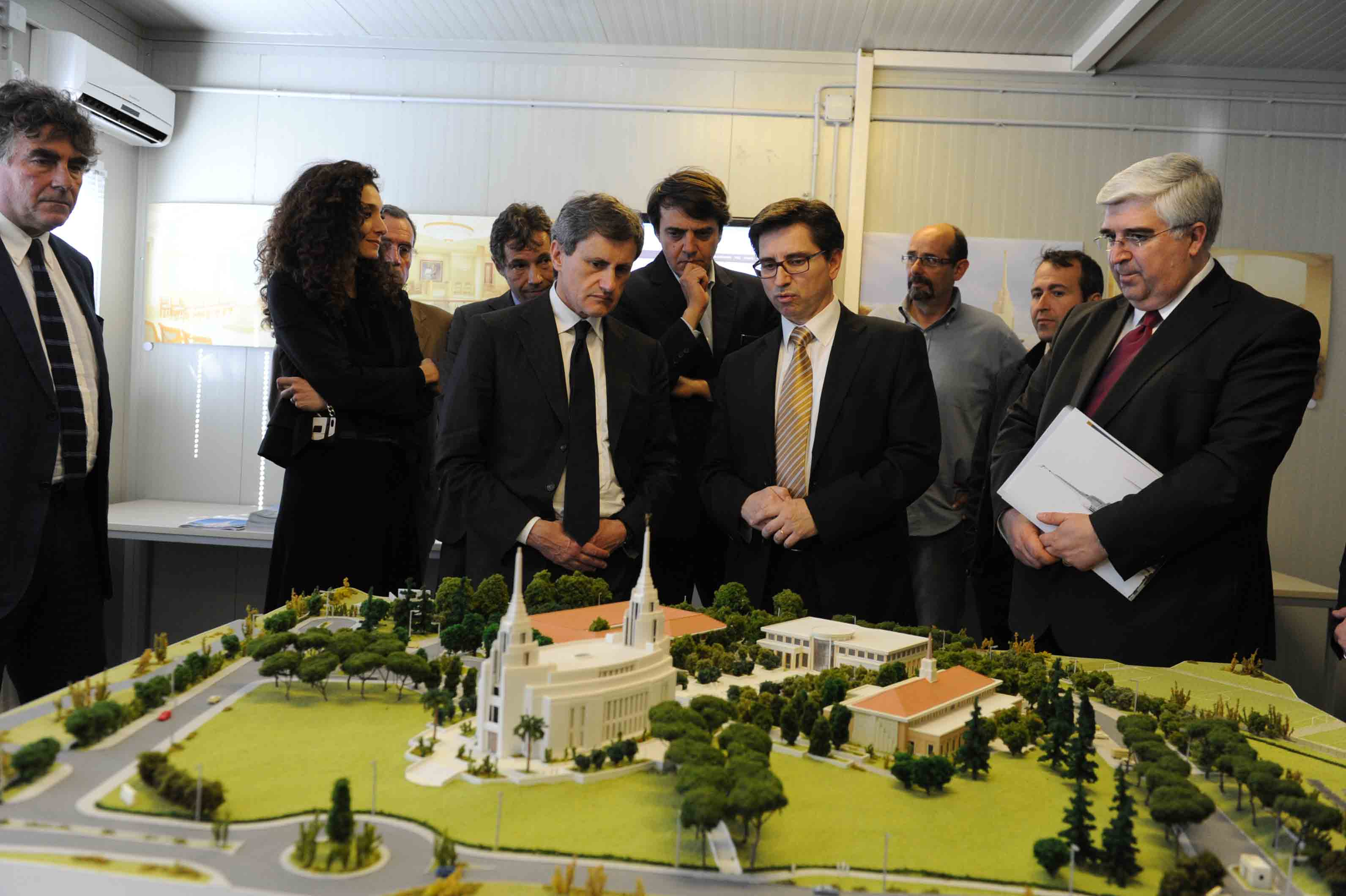
Mayor Gianni Alemanno visiting the community of Rome (2013)

At first, only a small parcel of land was available for construction of a temple, but the entire 15 acres of the land later became available for its construction and the associated building.

Before the temple was built, the land was a farm that the church acquired in 1997, which included the property of a villa, an olive plantation, and pizza broiler on the outside. This was a place church members used to gather and host activities from time to time; church missionaries also resided there for a period of time.

On 4 October 2008, Monson announced plans to build a temple in Rome. In preparation for the construction, and as part of the permit process, all potential building sites in Rome must undergo a search for ancient Roman ruins by digging trenches every 10 to 15 feet apart across the entire property. Following the search for ruins on the temple property, it was announced that none were found, and construction would be permitted.

A groundbreaking ceremony for the temple was held 23 October 2010, with Monson presiding. Only invited guests attended the groundbreaking, but the ceremony was rebroadcast to Latter-day Saint meetinghouses in Italy the following day. Dignitaries at the groundbreaking included Vice Mayor of Rome, Giuseppe Ciardi, Italian senator Lucio Malan, along with Monson, William R. Walker, and Erich W. Kopischke, each of whom were general authorities.

On March 29, 2018, the church announced that a public open house would be held from January 28 through February 16, 2019, excluding Sundays. All 15 of the church's apostles attended the temple's dedication. It is believed to be the first time the entire First Presidency and Quorum of the Twelve Apostles were in the same location outside the United States.

The temple was dedicated in three sessions on March 10, 2019 by church president Russell M. Nelson, with two more sessions held each of the following two days.

In 2020, like all the church's others, the Rome Italy Temple was closed for a time in response to the COVID-19 pandemic.

== Design and architecture ==
Neils Valentiner, the architect of the Rome Italy Temple, said its design is inspired by San Carlino Roman Catholic church in Rome, with a curved design on both the building's exterior and interior. The surfaces throughout the temple, including the floors, walls and countertops are made of Perlato Svevo marbles, which were quarried in Italy. Other stones from Italy, Spain, Turkey, and Brazil were added to them.

=== Site ===
The temple occupies part of a 15-acre (61,000 m^{2}) site owned by the church near the Grande Raccordo Anulare ring road skirting Cinquina in the northeast of Rome. This site is located in Rome's Municipio III (formerly IV), along the via di Settebagni.

The site includes the temple, a church meetinghouse, visitors' center, Family History Center (FHC), piazza, guest housing, and landscaped gardens and fountains.

The Rome Italy Temple is a three-story building where church members perform religious ordinances. It is on the site's east, on top of the piazza, with stone steps and fountains that lead down to the visitors' center on the opposite end. The meetinghouse, where members and visitors gather together for Sunday church services and social activities during the week, is on the west. Another building on the north accommodates patrons who have traveled long distances and the FHC which offers resources, facilities, equipment and services for doing genealogy work.

=== Exterior ===
The temple is three stories tall, constructed with Bianco Sardo granite. The exterior has an angel Moroni statue and two attached end spires. The design uses elements that reflect both local culture and broader church symbolism.

=== Interior ===
At the temple's entrance is a floor-to-ceiling stained-glass wall that depicts a scene of Jesus Christ's life. An olive tree and its leaves are featured on other additional art-glass. Other inside highlights include an oval design staircase, a mural featuring Italian landscape from the ocean to the slopes in the instruction room, a Baroque-style bridal room with crystal sconces and hand-painted chairs, sculpted-off white carpets in the sealing and celestial rooms. Additionally, the baptistry has an elliptical font, inlaid stones and Roman-style acanthus leaves. Original paintings are found throughout the temple.

The temple includes two ordinance rooms, three sealing rooms, and a baptistry.

=== Symbols ===
The design has elements representing church and Biblical symbolism, to provide spiritual meaning to its appearance and function. Symbolism is important to church members and includes an olive and live tree-motif, which symbolizes the resurrection of Christ; this is due to the fact that olive trees are difficult to kill, sprouting even when their roots have been cut.

=== Visitors' Center ===
Near the entrance of the visitors' center is an art-glass work created by a team of 25 artists led by Tom and Gayle Holdman. It depicts the 100 references of Christ’s life on earth, containing symbols of His parables in the New Testament.

Behind the art-work on the other side is a copy of Bertel Thorvaldsen's Christus statue, as well as copies of his twelve apostle statues found in the Lutheran Cathedral Church of Our Lady in Copenhagen, facing the temple in a rotunda, with an Italian landscape as background.

Opposite to the statues is a see-through floor-to-ceiling glass window that reflects the statue of Christ on the temple across the grounds, a similar effect can be seen from outside the visitors' center, where the temple is reflected on or near the statue of Christ.

Other features in the visitors' center include separate rooms and quiet places for reflection or discussions by missionaries with those interested in the church, and a small theater that plays the “Storms of Life” videos - recordings of how individuals confront and manage real life challenges. Additionally, a large model of the temple is on display to show the rooms, settings, and inside features. A map showing locations of meetinghouses all across the country can be found upstairs with the FHC.

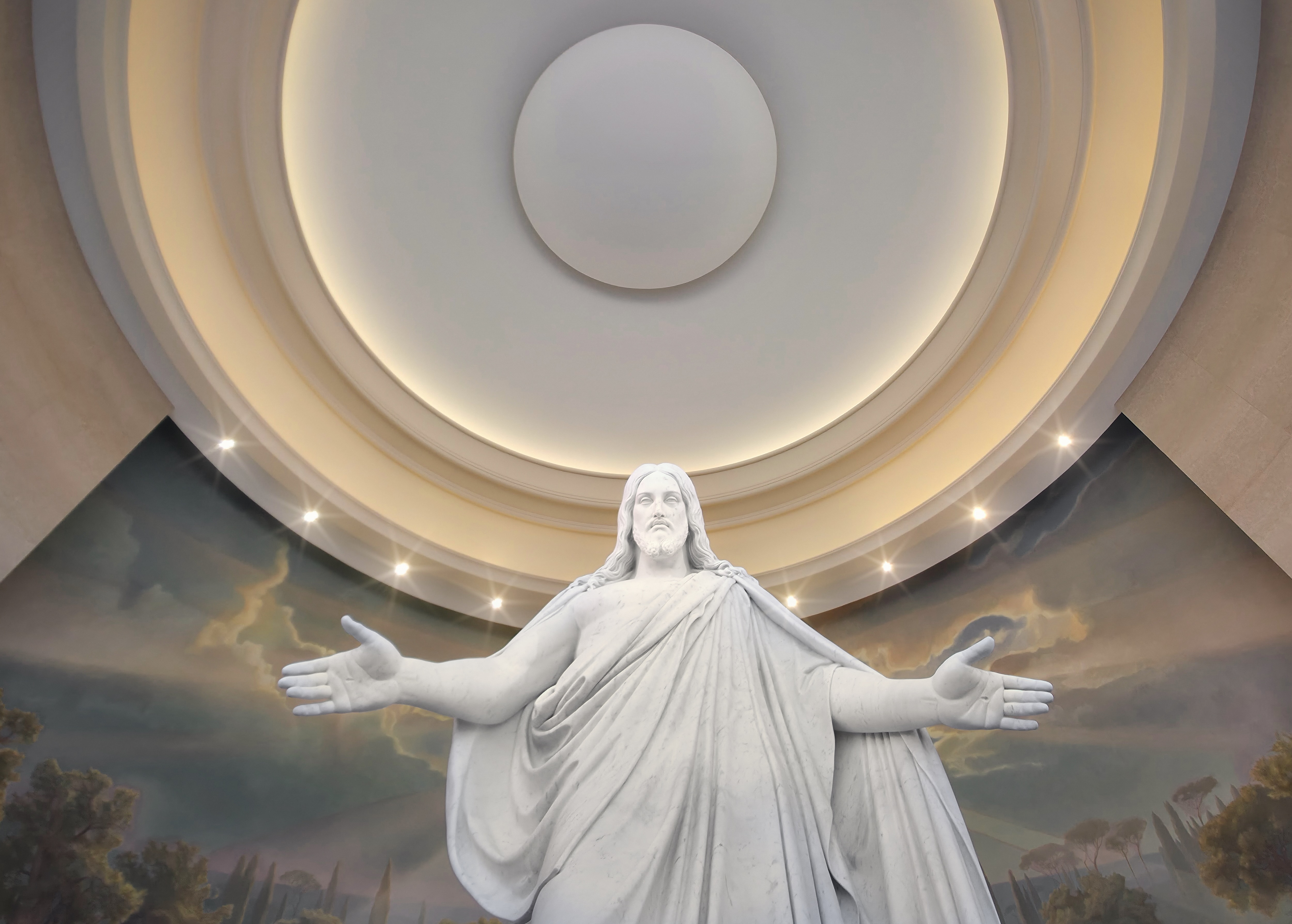
Bertel Thorvaldsen's Christus

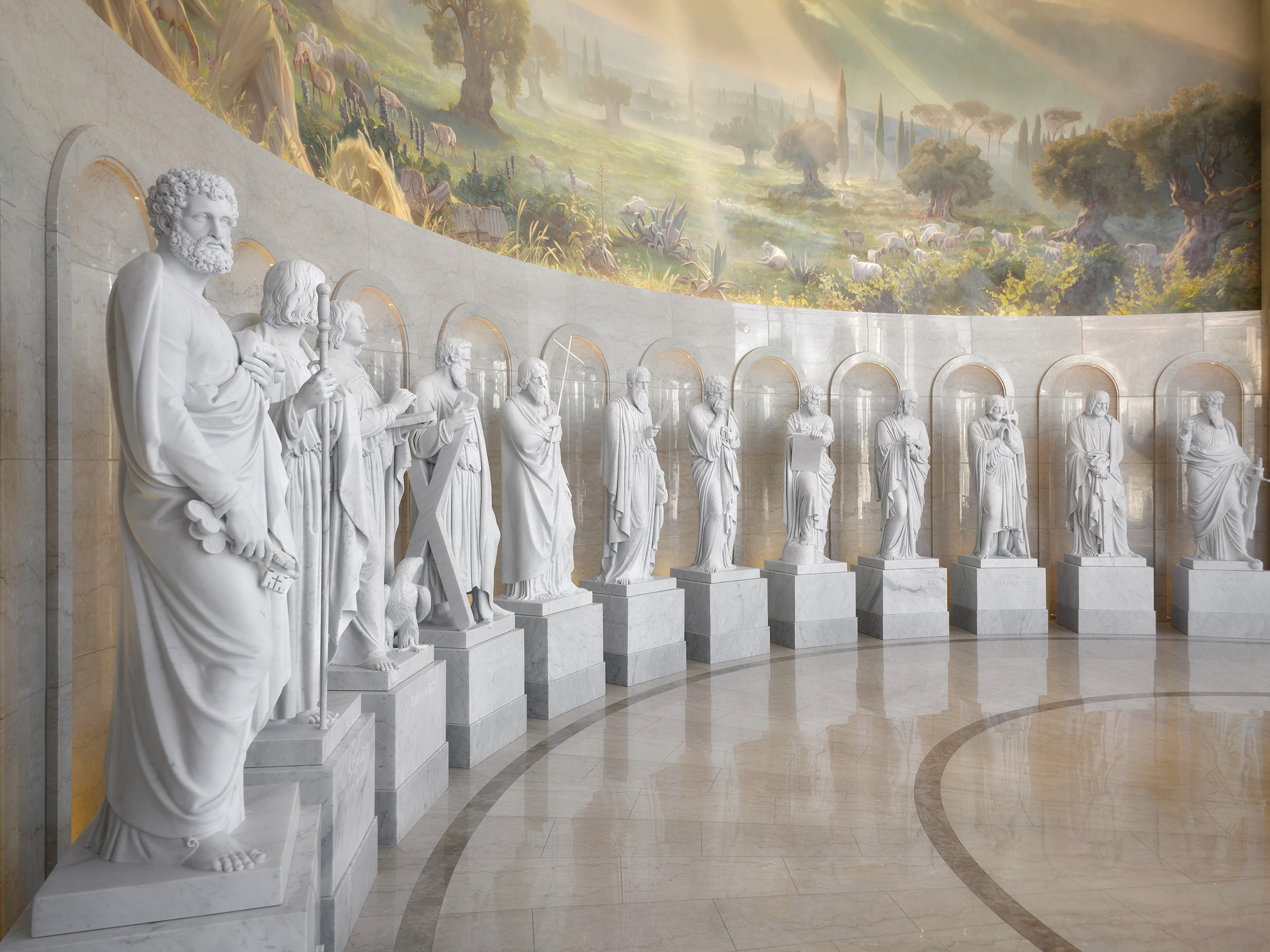
Bertel Thorvaldsen's Twelve Apostles

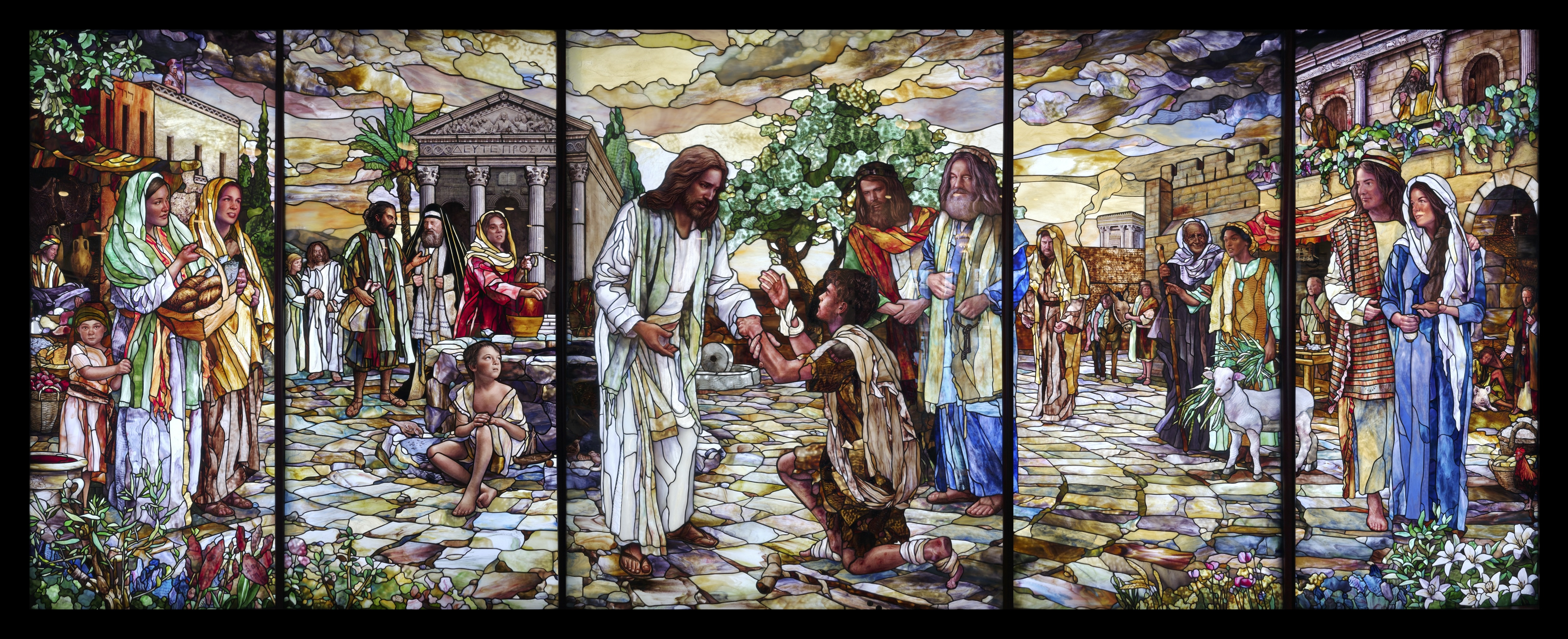
Tom Holdman's stained glass

== Cultural and community impact ==
The temple and its surrounding grounds provide a gathering place for some community events, including art exhibits, lecture series, and concerts. These events highlight the church's desire to create a sense of community and promote mutual understanding among residents of diverse backgrounds.

The area also hosts outreach programs, including members of Brigham Young University’s “Freedom and Respect Among Religions” project. These efforts underscore the church's commitment to serving the broader community and enhancing the well-being of its residents.

The Rome Italy Temple also plays a role in educating and spiritually uplifting those who visit. Insights into the faith and resilience of Italian church members is presented at the adjacent visitors' center, equipped with stained glass murals, paintings, marble statues of Jesus Christ and his apostles, and interactive exhibits.

== Temple presidents ==
The church's temples are directed by a temple president and matron, each typically serving for a term of three years. The president and matron oversee the administration of temple operations and provide guidance and training for both temple patrons and staff.

Serving from 2019 to 2022, Craig N. Pacini was the first president, with Julie A. Pacini serving as matron. As of 2025, Daniele Lui is the president, with Settimia Lucia Petarra serving as matron.

== Admittance ==
On January 14, 2019, the church announced the public open house that was held from January 28 to February 16, 2019 (excluding Sundays). Following the open house, the temple was dedicated during seven sessions from March 10–12, 2019, by Russell M. Nelson. Like all the church's temples, it is not used for Sunday worship services. To members of the church, temples are regarded as sacred houses of the Lord. Once dedicated, only church members with a current temple recommend can enter for worship. The visitors’ center is available to the public.

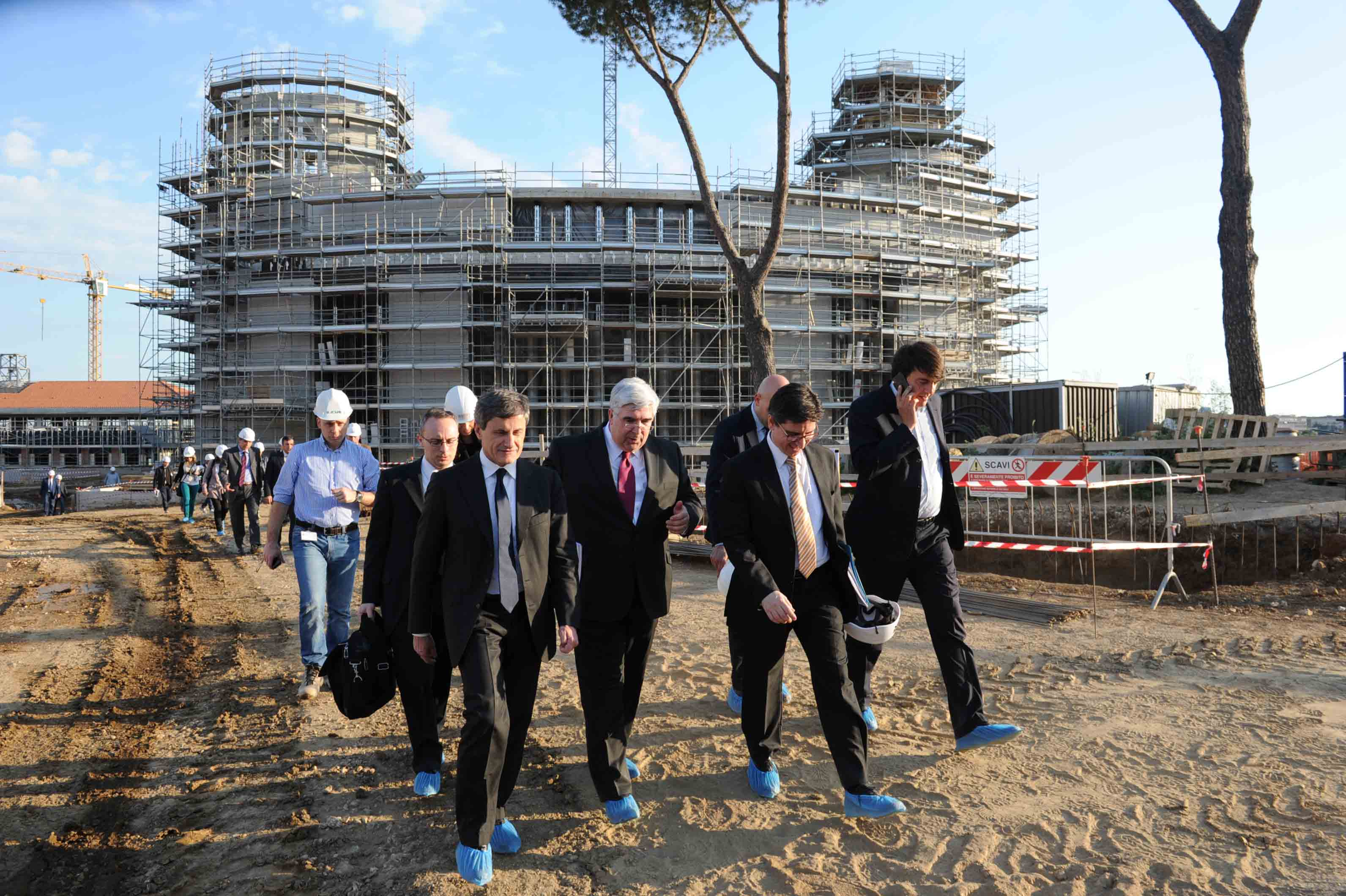
The temple under construction in 2013.

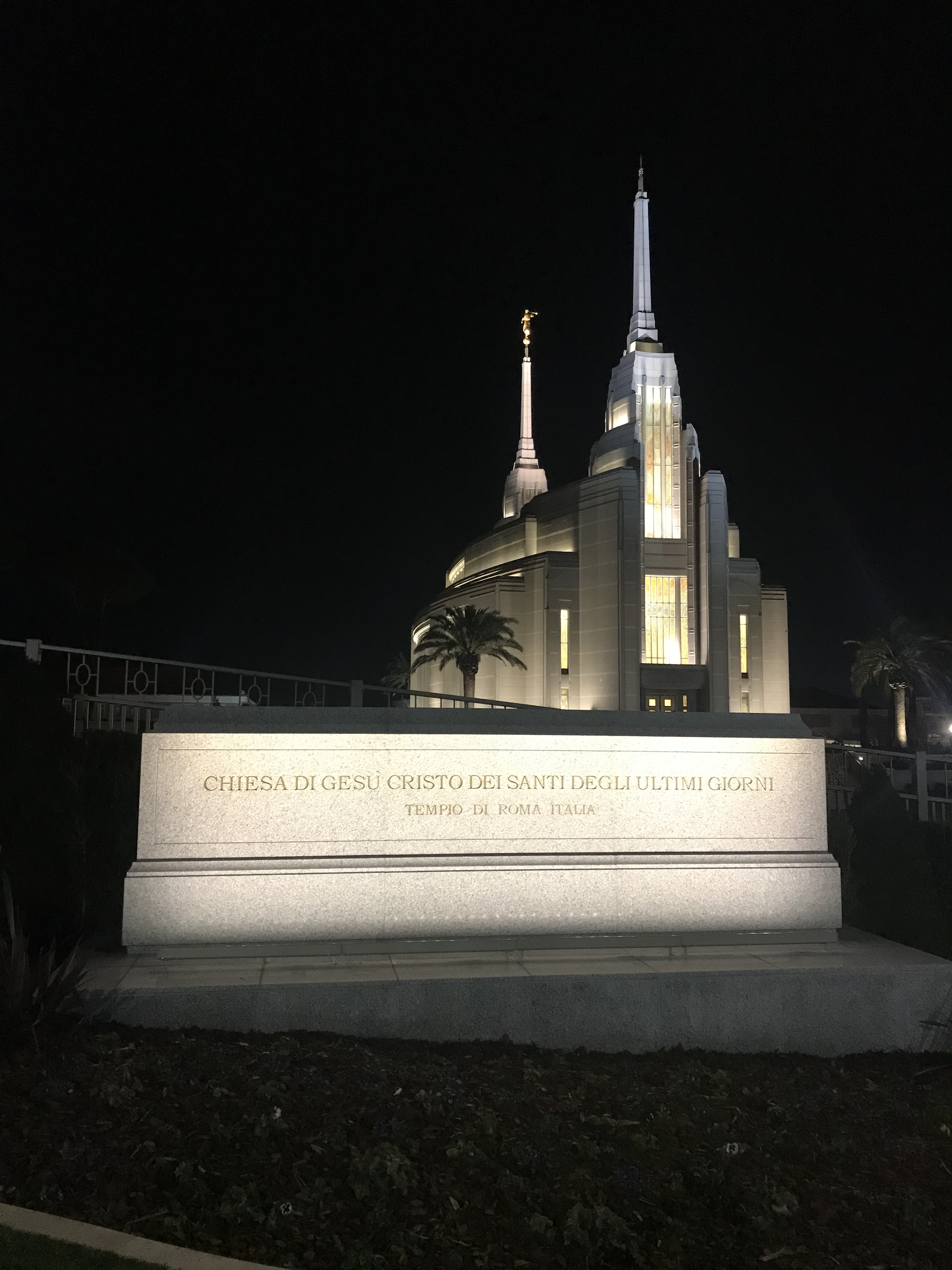
Rome Italy Temple at night

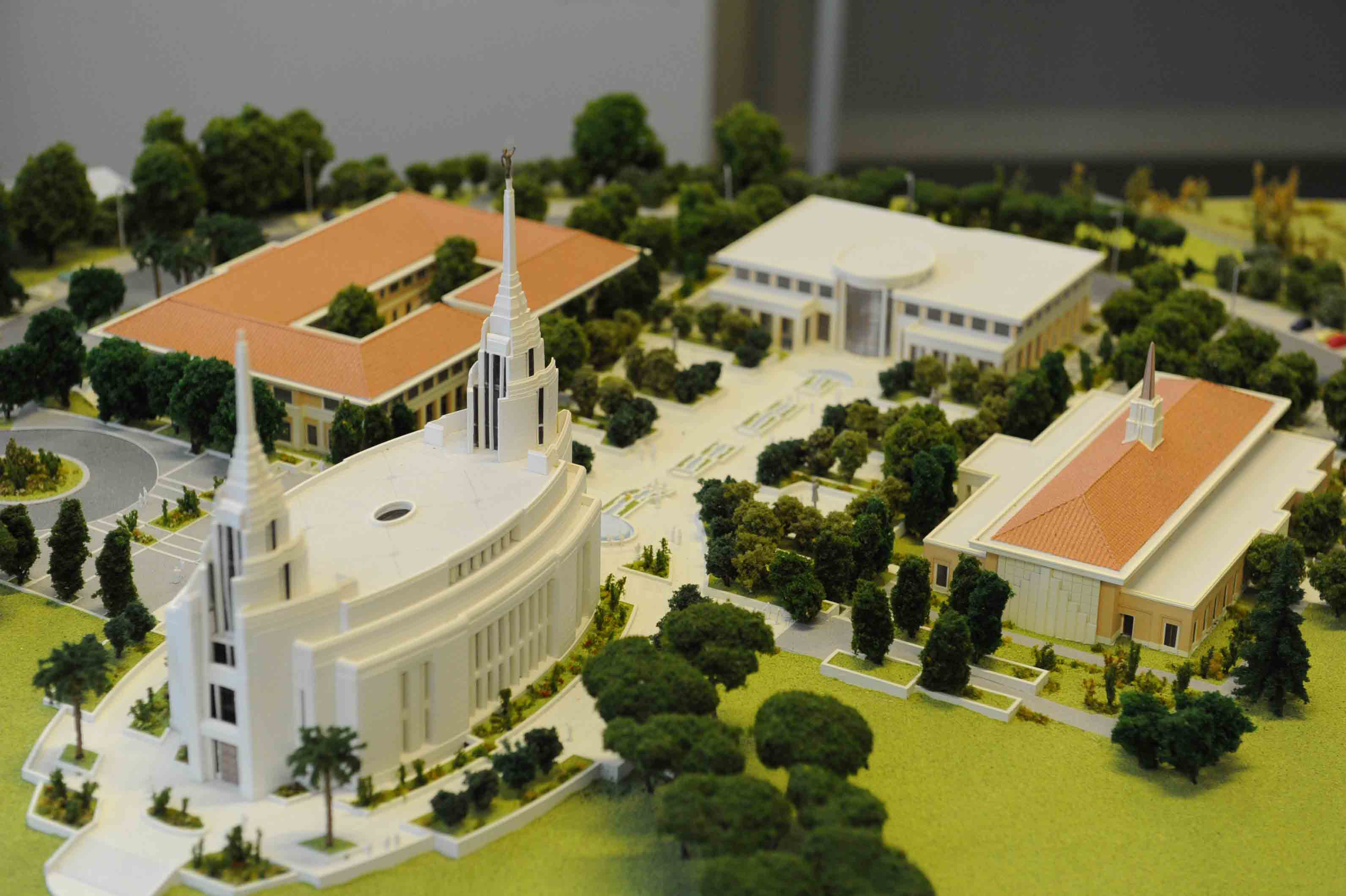
Model of Rome Italy Temple grounds

== See also ==
- Comparison of temples (LDS Church)
- List of temples (LDS Church)
- List of temples by geographic region (LDS Church)
- Temple architecture (LDS Church)
