= Beautiful People (American TV series) =

- Created by: Michael Rauch
- Starring: Daphne Zuniga; Sarah Foret; Torrey DeVitto; Jackson Rathbone; Ricky Mabe; Kathleen Munroe; Jordan Madley; Sean Wing
- Opening theme: "I'll Be There" by The Afters
- Composer: Adam Fields
- Country of origin: United States
- Original language: English
- No. of seasons: 2
- No. of episodes: 16

Production
- Executive producers: Paul Stupin; Michael Rauch
- Producers: John Ryan; Lisa Albert (season 2)
- Running time: 60 minutes
- Production companies: 34 Films; Pirates' Cove Entertainment; Sony Pictures Television; ABC Family

Original release
- Network: ABC Family
- Release: August 8, 2005 – April 24, 2006

Beautiful People is an American drama television series about a family that moves from New Mexico to New York City to make a fresh start on their lives. The series aired on the ABC Family network from August 8, 2005, to April 24, 2006, lasting sixteen episodes. Its executive producer was Paul Stupin, who played the same role for Dawson's Creek.

== Plot ==
An academically gifted teen Sophie Kerr (Sarah Foret), her model-beautiful older sister Karen Kerr (Torrey DeVitto) and their newly single mother Lynn Kerr (Daphne Zuniga) leave small town New Mexico in search of a new life in New York City. After their father runs off with his teenage mistress, Sophie and Karen decide their family needs a fresh start. They convince their mother that the big city holds promise for all of them. Sophie has received a scholarship to a Manhattan private school, Karen can pursue her dreams of modeling, and Lynn can leave the painful memories of her failed marriage behind her, while reviving the ambitions of becoming a fashion designer which she put on hold to raise a family.

== Characters ==
=== Main ===
- Lynne "Lynn" Kerr (Daphne Zuniga): Lynne leaves New Mexico after her husband leaves her for her daughter Karen's best friend. When she arrives in New York City she is a retailer at first, until she gets a jump start in the fashion world and starts working for a prominent sportswear designer. She bumps into her college sweetheart Julian Fiske, for whom she still has feelings.
- Karen Kerr (Torrey DeVitto): Beautiful and vivacious, Karen is an aspiring model who is usually confident, but she loses some of that confidence when she begins taking diet pills to be thinner at the suggestion of one of her agents. Her first modeling gig is when she poses for the cover of a Brighton School magazine in a school business competition. She also worked wearing a chicken suit, among other odd gigs.
- Sophie Kerr (Sarah Foret): Gifted and intelligent, Sophie is a talented photographer who wins a scholarship to the prestigious Brighton School, a hub for the children of Manhattan's elite. She meets her good friend Gideon Lustig, who ends up falling for Sophie and Annabelle. Sophie finds herself in a romantic dilemma between elitist Nicholas Fiske and artistic Gideon.
- Nicholas Fiske (Jackson Rathbone): Charming and extravagantly rich, Nicholas is the heir to Fiske Publications and is a BP and captain of the JV lacrosse team at the exclusive Brighton School. He turns his back on then-girlfriend Paisley Bishop to start a relationship with new girl Sophie Kerr, whose heart Nicholas competes for with Gideon.
- Gideon Lustig (Ricky Mabe): Sensitive and adorable Gideon is a vulnerable artist who is constantly put down by his wealthy, world-renowned artist father. Gideon believes that just because he has money doesn't mean he's better than others who aren't as fortunate. He develops a crush on Sophie Kerr and is caught in a love triangle with her and long-time best friend, Annabelle Banks.
- Annabelle Banks (Kathleen Munroe): An aspiring photographer, Annabelle is in the shadow of Gideon, her long-time crush, when Sophie Kerr rolls into town. Her parents are divorced and both her parents left six months after it was finalized, leaving Annabelle with a babysitter. Annabelle explores her sexuality, ultimately realizing that she is bisexual
- Paisley Bishop (Jordan Madley) (season 1): Wealthy, snobbish, and popular, Paisley is a BP and is used to getting whatever she wants, unless longtime on-and-off boyfriend Nicholas Fiske is involved. Her family owns the Empire State Building and she drives a silver Porsche.
- Chris Pritchett (Sean Wing) (season 2)

=== Recurring ===
- Kyle Schmid as Evan Frasier (season 1)
- Michèle Duquet as Rona Fiske (season 1)
- Matthew Del Negro as Ben Lewis (season 2)
- Kimberly Huie as Madisen "Maddy" Kinkaid (season 2)
- Arnold Pinnock as Toby Sayles
- Peter Hermann as Luke Dalton (season 2)
- Michael B. Silver as Dean Stein (season 1)
- Stephen Amell as Jason (season 1)
- Jennifer Miller as Claudette (season 1)
- Grant Show as Daniel Kerr
- Cameron Bancroft as Joe Seplar (season 1)
- Sasha Roiz as Mr. Tabor (season 1)
- Barbara Mamabolo as Zoe (season 1)
- Elizabeth Whitmere as Chelsea (season 2)
- Janaya Stephens as Ms. Newburg (season 2)

== Episodes ==
Season	Episodes	Originally released	
Season	Episodes	First released	Last released
1	8	August 8, 2005	September 26, 2005
2	8	March 6, 2006	April 24, 2006

=== Season 1 (2005) ===
No. overall	No. in season	Title	Directed by	Written by	Original release date	Prod. code
1	1	"Pilot"	Dennie Gordon	Michael Rauch	August 8, 2005	101
When Lynn Kerr's daughter Sophie wins a scholarship to an elite school she must pack up her two daughters and move from New Mexico to New York City. As Sophie starts school she quickly finds out the school is run by the "beautiful people" and they aren't too impressed by her.
2	2	"Point and Shoot"	Dennie Gordon	Michael Rauch	August 15, 2005	102
Nicky and Gideon 'apologize', clearly just for the girls' sake. Nicky joins the advanced photography class to be with Sophie, but she reproaches him 'taking' a really interested kid's place. Would-be model Karen develops anorexia and becomes a cocktail waitress in a nightclub, not listening to her mother's objections. She discover Tommy is the barman, and like her hid that lowly status, but they still end up together. Lynne is engaged at Toby Sayles's sports boutique, but resigns as soon as she realizes Julian's influence secretly got her the job. Paisley plays it cool when Nicky dumps her, but is jealous enough to steal Sophie's camera, a gift from her dad. Nicky helps her, leaves the class, but still learns about photography. Sophie fails to match her mother and photography teacher, David Stein, at the dinner her mother throws to 'make friends'.
3	3	"Reload"	Ken Girotti	Vince Calandra & Michael Rauch	August 22, 2005	103
Sophie and Nicholas get competitive for their mid-term project as Sophie challenges him to acknowledge their kiss and not to be embarrassed in front of his friends with her. Meanwhile, Karen makes a drastic decision about her job.
4	4	"Over Exposure"	Mel Damski	Elizabeth Davis	August 29, 2005	104
Gideon's painting talent gets him an advantage at the Brighton Academy's 'white part', where boys paint T-shirts on girls, which are then handed over for charity auction. Nicky is delighted Sophie partakes and solves her unease to be 'handled' by painting hers himself. Jealous Paisley spills the boys' annual seduction bet. Enraged by receiving her long overdue divorce papers, Lynn scolds neighbor Joe Seplar for everything males ever did to females. Later she apologizes by offering the NPD detective a dinner, in order to end 20 years dating drought. She seduces the perfect gentleman onto her bed, then turns frigid again. Karen sleeps with fashion executive Kevin Strong. When he can't make their next dinner date, she lands him with a monster bill and rages when they meet, ending up with egg on her bitching face.
5	5	"Dark, Room, Chemicals"	Milan Cheylov	Jennifer Glickman	September 5, 2005	105
Karen grumbles the girls have no time for her. Her boss sends her to Chicago to run a fashion show, but her luggage gets lost. Only Julian can help, yet the ingrate keeps very distant. Sophie is facing a bad grade in chemistry. Karen, on diet pills, calls her away from study group after getting robbed and lost in the Bronx. Their ride home from a nightclub proves too adventurous. Gideon worries about Sophie, Nicky finds out and actually gets them looking, but gratitude is barely flimsy there too.
6	6	"F-Stop"	Patrick Williams	Deborah Joy LeVine	September 12, 2005	106
Lynn, Sophie, and Karen are invited over to the Fiskes' home in Hamptons for a weekend. While there, a game of "Truth or Dare" gets a little out of hand. Meanwhile, Sophie encourages Annabelle to tell Gideon how she feels about him.
7	7	"Blow Up"	Robert Berlinger	Michael Rauch	September 19, 2005	107
Lynn creates a new design for her company's fashion launch and she asks Karen to model her design for her.
8	8	"Photo Finish"	Kelly Makin	Michael Rauch	September 26, 2005	108
Karen eventually faces up to her personal problems. Meanwhile, Sophie and Lynn both have difficult decisions to make as Lynn's ex-husband Daniel turns up and wants Sophie and Karen to come back home with him.

=== Season 2 (2006) ===
No. overall	No. in season	Title	Directed by	Written by	Original release date	Prod. code
9	1	"Flashback to the Future"	Ken Girotti	Anne Kenney	March 6, 2006	109
Daniel decides to fight for custody of Sophie. Karen gets a new agent and accepts some unpleasant assignments just so she can move up in the modeling world. Meanwhile, Lynn and Julian's relationship takes to take its toll on Sophie and Nicky.
10	2	"It's All Uphill from Here"	Chris Grismer	Lisa Albert	March 13, 2006	110
Sophie upsets Lynn by skipping school and then enrages her more by inviting her father Daniel to Brighton's Parent Night. Meanwhile, Karen gets a job working as an assistant to a famous photographer, thanks to Julian. Elsewhere, Gideon and Annabelle's attempts to get closer fail at every hurdle.
11	3	"A Tale of Two Parties"	Ken Girotti	K.J. Steinberg	March 20, 2006	111
All of the Kerrs get to experience their first snowstorm in New York all apart. Lynn is with Julian, Sophie and Nicky go to a party, and Karen uses Ben's invite to a party for her own use to meet agents.
12	4	"Das Boots"	Patrick Williams	David Goldsmith	March 27, 2006	112
Lynn is under pressure as she faces possible eviction as well as the custody case with Daniel. Meanwhile, Karen discovers a secret.
13	5	"Black Diamonds, White Lies"	Ken Girotti	Michael Rauch	April 3, 2006	113
Lynn finds out that Karen's new boyfriend Luke Dalton is the venture capitalist that is potentially financing her new fashion line.
14	6	"Where Are We Now?"	Mel Damski	Elizabeth Davis	April 10, 2006	114
Karen and Ben take their relationship a little further and Sophie and Chris share their first kiss.
15	7	"Best Face Forward"	Michael DeCarlo	Story by : Anne Kenney; Teleplay by : Lisa Albert & Anne Kenney	April 17, 2006	115
Karen competes with other models for a spot in a national advertising campaign; Lynn grows less secure about the age difference between Jeremy and herself.
16	8	"And the Winner Is..."	Chris Grismer	Story by : Lisa Albert & Anne Kenney & Michael Rauch; Teleplay by : Michael Rauch	April 24, 2006	116
Karen awaits the results of the modeling contest; Lynn takes control of the showcase; Sophie tries to come to terms with Chris.

== Reception ==
Common Sense Media gave the series 3 out of 5 stars, and wrote: "Drama best for teens and up lacks sizzle."

Michael Ausiello writing for TV Guide was disappointed by the season premiere, saying "it reduced Daphne Zuniga to a glorified extra". He felt it was trying to be a big-city Gilmore Girls and was ready to write off the show but his interest was piqued by the season finale which cast Zuniga's former Melrose Place costar Grant Show, as her character's ex-husband.

== Home media release ==
The series was released for region 1 on August 8, 2006.
