= Wishmaster: The Prophecy Fulfilled =

2002 film

- Promotional release poster
- Directed by: Chris Angel
- Written by: John Benjamin Martin
- Based on: Characters by Peter Atkins
- Produced by: Gary Howsam; Gilles Paquin
- Starring: Michael Trucco; Tara Spencer-Nairn; Jason Thompson; Victor Webster; Kimberly Huie; John Novak
- Cinematography: Curtis J. Petersen
- Edited by: Marcus Manton
- Music by: Daryl Bennett; Jim Guttridge
- Production companies: GFT Entertainment; Paquin Entertainment Group
- Distributed by: Artisan Entertainment
- Release date: October 22, 2002
- Running time: 92 minutes
- Country: Canada
- Language: English

Wishmaster: The Prophecy Fulfilled is a 2002 Canadian dark fantasy horror film directed by Chris Angel and starring Michael Trucco, Tara Spencer-Nairn, Jason Thompson, Victor Webster, Kimberly Huie, and John Novak. It is the fourth and final installment of the Wishmaster film series.

== Plot ==
Painter Sam is in an accident that leaves him paraplegic when the bones in his legs are fractured. Due to his condition, Sam grows distant from his girlfriend Lisa due to his inability to have sex, and believes she is having an affair with their lawyer Steven. Sensing Sam's growing distance from Lisa, Steven offers Lisa a jewel he found hidden in an antique desk. The jewel, unknown to Steven, is the Djinn's cell. Lisa inadvertently awakens the Djinn, who kills Steven and takes his form. The Djinn/Steven begins making advances on Lisa to trick her into making wishes.

Sam's first wish is for the case on Sam's condition to be won. The Djinn calls the opposing attorney and forces him to torture himself until he signs a settlement for ten million dollars. The Djinn takes Lisa to a restaurant to celebrate winning the case and asks her what she wishes for the most. When she says she wishes Sam could walk again, the Djinn grants this wish, enabling Sam to walk, but not repairing the injuries that left him paralyzed. They go to Steven's place where they drink champagne. While getting more for them to drink, the Djinn hears Lisa wish she could love "Steven" for who he really is. Aware that his true form will lose her forever, he is unable to grant the third wish. The Djinn tries to understand human love in order to "make" Lisa truly love him, and in the process he develops feelings for her.

An angel attempts to kill Lisa to prevent the third wish from being granted, which would cause the release of all Djinn. Steven arrives and sends her away to safety. The angel and the Djinn fight, with the Djinn eventually winning the battle and killing the angel. Steven arrives at Lisa's house and they have sex in the living room. Lisa realizes she has missed having sex but does not love Steven. Steven asks Lisa if she "truly [loves him] for who [he is]" in an attempt to make her grant the third wish; she is taken aback and repulsed by his pushiness.

The Djinn brethren make their presence known, forcing Lisa to flee. Using his magic to make the upstairs a looping maze, Steven brings Lisa back to the bedroom and reveals his true form to her, offering Lisa a choice: take his hand as the second in command when the Djinn race takes over the world, or be cast down to another dimension of Hell. Sam returns and tries to save the day with the angel's sword, but is stabbed by the Djinn. While the Djinn is attempting to convince Lisa to take his hand, Sam signals Lisa to push the Djinn through the blade sticking out of Sam. Lisa does so, and both the Djinn and Sam perish. Lisa escapes from the house and looks back, remembering the happier times she and Sam shared.

== Cast ==
- Tara Spencer-Nairn as Lisa Burnley
- Michael Trucco as Steven Verdel
- Jason Thompson as Sam
- John Novak as the Djinn
- Victor Webster as Hunter
- John Benjamin Martin as Douglas Hollister
- Kimberly Huie as Tracy
- Mariam Bernstein as Jennifer
- Mandy Hochbaum as Shopper
- Jennifer Pudavick as Waitress

== Production ==
Wishmaster 3: Beyond the Gates of Hell and Wishmaster: The Prophecy Fulfilled were shot back-to-back in Winnipeg, Manitoba. David DeCoteau was initially slated to direct the films, but scheduling conflicts with DeCoteau's The Brotherhood led to him leaving the productions.

In a scene where the Djinn shows Lisa an illusion of paradise, they are standing on a pond in Assiniboine Park, a notable locale for the city. The Assiniboine Park Pavilion can be seen just above the tree line in the background of the scene.

== Release ==
Wishmaster: The Prophecy Fulfilled was given a straight-to-video release in the United States on October 22, 2002.

== Reception ==
On Rotten Tomatoes the film has an approval rating of 20% based on reviews from 5 critics.

David Nusair of Reel Film Reviews gave it 2.5 out of 4 and wrote: "Wishmaster 4 easily redeems the series after the horrible second and third installments."

== Works cited ==
- Vatnsdal, Caelum (2004). They Came From Within: A History of Canadian Horror Cinema. Arbeiter Ring Publishing.
