= Tom Holdman =

American glass artist (born 1970)

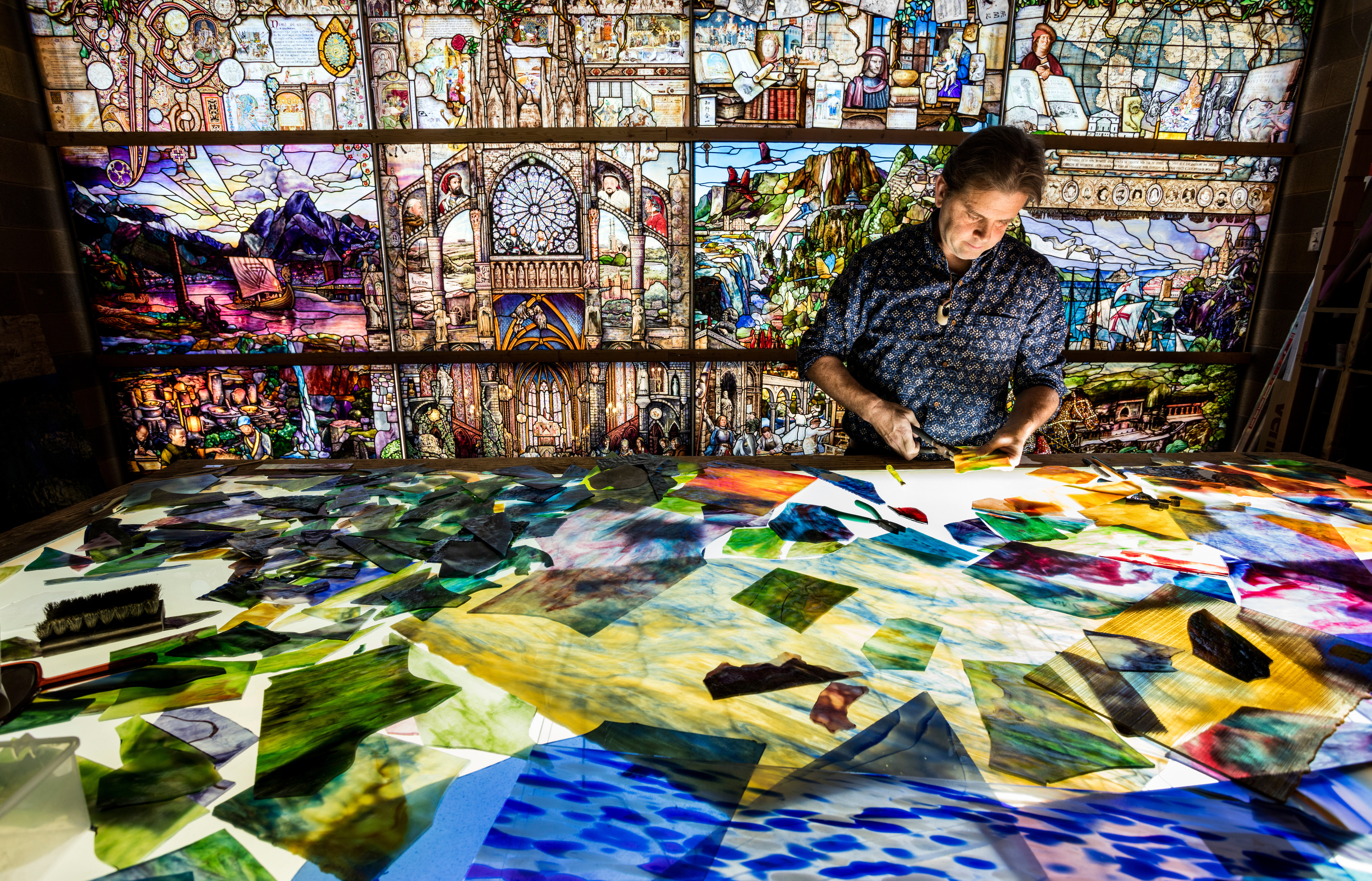
- Born: April 8, 1970 (age 55)
- Known for: Stained glass
- Notable work: Roots of Knowledge, Orem City Library, LDS Church's Rome Temple visitors' center
- Spouse: Gayle Holdman
- Website: www.holdmanstudios.com

Tom Holdman (born April 8, 1970) is a glass artist located in Lehi, Utah, United States. His works include the story telling stained-glass windows in the Orem City Library in Orem, Utah; the Roots of Knowledge stained-glass window at Utah Valley University (UVU); and pieces for more than 50 temples of the Church of Jesus Christ of Latter-day Saints (LDS Church).

== Career ==
Holdman's interest in stained glass began in high school when a teacher acted as a mentor to Holdman's art. When he was 21, Holdman started a stained-glass studio out of his parents' garage and found patrons by traveling door-to-door. He founded Holdman Studios in 1988 in Lehi, UT. One of his first stained-glass works was for the Orem Public Library, funded by Karen and Alan Ashton, depicting classic children's fairytales and stories. Holdman describes his introduction to glass-art, "It’s a partnership of three — the artist, the glass and the light. You are only one-third of that partnership. I loved how the light interacted with the glass. It’s hundreds of pieces of art as it is affected by the sun. That captivated me."

=== Roots of Knowledge ===
Holdman's Roots of Knowledge is a 200-foot stained glass wall installation, located in UVU's Fulton Library. Completed in 2016, the project took 12 years to complete at a budget of $3 million. The wall includes depictions of Isaac Newton, Harriet Tubman, the Berlin Wall, Stonehenge, the Millennium Falcon, Gandhi, and Alfred Hitchcock (holding a knife behind his back). It also contains real objects encased in glass including a Roman coin, a piece of meteorite, and a spoon from the 1893 Chicago World’s Fair. After an exhibition in London The Guardian called it 'one of the most spectacular stained-glass windows made in the past century'.

=== LDS Church projects ===
While the Palmyra New York Temple was under construction, the LDS Church asked Holdman to create a glass-art depiction of the First Vision to be included in the temple. His work is also featured in the Manhattan New York, Paris France, and Laie Hawaii temples. Holdman designed, created, and installed a four-panel depiction of Jesus Christ's life, miracles, and parables in the visitors' center of the Rome Italy Temple.

== Personal life ==
Holdman was born and raised in Orem, Utah, and has spoken with a stutter since childhood. He attended Orem High School and UVU and served a mission for the LDS Church to Dallas, Texas.
