= Ellen Gerstein =

American actress

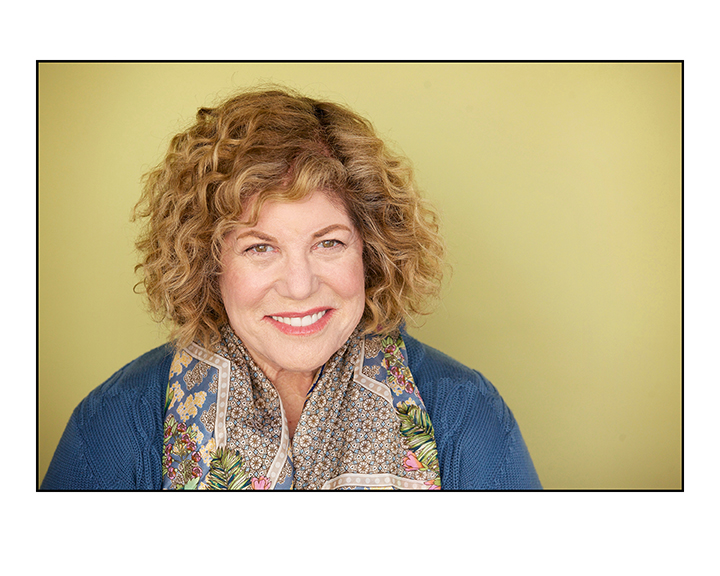
- Occupations: Actress, comedian, writer, producer, director
- Years active: 1977 - present

Ellen Gerstein is an American actress, comedian, writer, producer, and director. She is known for her roles in television series such as The Whole Truth, Shameless, and Seinfeld, and films such as Venom and James Dean. She is also known for directing the award-winning short film Come Away with Me.

== Education ==
Gerstein has a graduate degree in Psychology, from Antioch University.

== Career ==
Gerstein spent six years working as a social worker in Manhattan.

One of Gerstein’s first roles was in the comedy film Coast to Coast, which was released in 1980.

Gerstein appeared in an episode of Seinfeld, titled “The Stake Out,” which first aired in 1990. Her other credits in the 1990s include Friends, the HBO television film Witch Hunt, Phyllis Nagy’s Girl Bar (play) in 1994, and the musical television film Annie in 1999.

Gerstein made her directorial debut with the short film Waiting for Ronald, which was released in 2003. The film went on to win the Award of Merit at the 2015 Best Shorts Competition and the Audience Choice Best Short Film award at the Method Fest Film Festival.

Gerstein starred in the play “A Tragedy on West Utica,” which was performed at the LA LUPA Fest One-Act Festival in 2011.

Gerstein’s credits in the 2010s include Liza on Demand, Shameless, Fresh Off the Boat, and The Morning Show.

Gerstein was set to star as one of the leads in the Pulitzer Prize-winning play ‘night, Mother in 2014, but was forced to drop out for medical reasons. She remained on the project as a producer.

At the 2015 Spotlight Short Film Awards, Gerstein received the Platinum Award for her short film Come Away with Me. She produced, directed, starred in, and wrote an original song for the project. She produced, directed, starred in, and wrote an original song for the project. She won the Best Director award at the 2015 Atlanta Shortsfest, the Platinum Remi award at Worldfest Houston, and the Best Short Film award at the 2016 Imagine This Women’s International Film Festival for her work on the film. The film was also nominated for Best Drama at the 2015 LAIFF Awards. It was also one of the short films shown at the 2016 Sonoma International Film Festival.

At the 2016 Cape May Film Festival, Gerstein received the Robert Prosky Character Actor Award.

Gerstein starred in the short film Passage, which was released in 2018. For her role in the film, she won the Best Supporting Actress award in the Featurette category at the 2018 Idyllwild International Festival of Cinema.

Gerstein appeared as Mrs. Manfredi in the 2018 film Venom, based on the Marvel Comics character of the same name. She also starred in the independent film Turnover, which was released in 2019.

== Personal life ==
In her spare time, Gerstein enjoys fostering and taking care of dogs. She is a member of the Alliance of Women Directors.

== Filmography ==
Film

Year	Title	Director	Writer	Producer	Actress	Notes	Ref.
1977	The Billion Dollar Hobo	No	No	No	Yes	As Waitress	
1978	Jokes My Folks Never Told Me	No	No	No	Yes		
1978	Carla	No	No	No	Yes	As Waitress; short film	
1980	Coast to Coast	No	No	No	Yes	Nurse #1	
1981	Going Ape!	No	No	No	Yes	As Sister	
1983	I’m Going to Be Famous	No	No	No	Yes		
1984	Joy of Sex	No	No	No	Yes	As Nurse #2	
1984	Body Rock	No	No	No	Yes	As Secretary	
1986	The Education of Allison Tate	No	No	No	Yes	As Secretary	
1987	My Demon Lover	No	No	No	Yes	As Policewoman	
1987	Emanon	No	No	No	Yes	As Lynn	
1988	Daddy’s Boys	No	No	No	Yes	As Madame Wang/Henrietta	
1996	Inside Out	No	No	No	Yes	As Lawyer; short film	
1998	Murder of Crows	No	No	No	Yes	As Landlady	
2000	Boys Life 3	No	No	No	Yes	As Lawyer	
2003	Waiting for Ronald	Yes	Yes	No	No		
2004	You Are So Going to Hell!	No	No	No	Yes	As Thelma	
2005	Break a Leg	No	No	No	Yes	As “Secret Scruples” Casting Director	
2010	Treasure of the Black Jaguar	No	No	No	Yes	As Ms. Shaneberg	
2011	Autumn and George	No	No	No	Yes	As Waitress Ellen; short film	
2013	Sylvia Rents a Kid	Yes	Yes	No	Yes	As Sylvia: short film	
2014	Swelter	No	No	No	Yes	As Harriet	
2015	Come Away with Me	Yes	Yes	Yes	Yes	As Ann Chambers; short film	
2016	Come Away with Me: The Documentary Short	Yes	Yes	Yes	Yes	As self	
2016	Interior Night	No	No	No	Yes	As Mavis	
2016	Auto-Cowrecked	No	No	No	Yes	As Rita	
2017	The Golden Age	No	No	No	Yes	As Kathryn O’ Malley	
2017	Firm with Purpose	No	No	No	Yes	As Kathy; short film	
2017	After the Hutch	No	No	No	Yes	As Bunny Mother; short film	
2018	The Interview	No	No	No	Yes	As Margaret; short film	
2018	Passage	No	No	No	Yes	As June; short film	
2018	Venom	No	No	No	Yes	As Hospital Lady with Dog/Mrs. Manfredi	
2019	Turnover	No	No	No	Yes	As Cherub	
2019	Speed of Life	No	No	No	Yes	As Older Woman/Jean	
2019	The Planters	No	No	No	Yes	As Judy Fine/Lady with a Lisp; voice role	
2021	The Dead of Night	No	No	No	Yes	As Nana	
2022	God Save the Queens	No	No	No	Yes	As Eloise	
2023	Proof Sheet	No	No	No	Yes	As Waitress	
2024	Bad Generation	No	No	No	Yes	As Patty the Customer	
2024	Aloha Means I Love You	No	No	No	Yes	Bertie	

Television

Year	Title	Role	Notes	Ref.
1983	Likely Stories, Vol. 4	Turtle Head Story Lady	In “A Lovely Way to Spend an Evening” segment	
1984	It Came Upon a Midnight Clear	Nurse	TV movie	
1985	Cheers	Mo McSweeney		
1986	L.A. Law	Bailiff Woman		
1989	Duet	Instructor		
1990	Seinfeld	Carol		
1990	I’m Dangerous Tonight	Server	TV movie	
1991	Vidiots	Bertha	TV movie	
1992	Quantum Leap	Woman		
1993	There Was a Little Boy	Tina	TV movie	
1994	Witch Hunt	Sydney’s wife	TV movie	
1995	California Dreams	Esther		
1996	Lois & Clark: The New Adventures of Superman	Fortune Teller		
1999	It’s Like, You Know…	Woman #1/Daughter		
1999	Annie	Sophie	TV movie; part of The Wonderful World of Disney	
2001	James Dean	Jane Deacy	TV movie	
2002	Friends	Aunt Lisa		
2010–2011	The Whole Truth	Tina	Leading role	
2011	Baby Boomer Bunnies	Bunny Mother	TV movie	
2012	Southland	Crazy Carol		
2012–2013	Shameless	Aunt Rande		
2016	Twin Turbo	Nonna		
2016–2017	Broke A$$ Rich Kid	Katia		
2017	Fresh Off the Boat	Lillian		
2017	Law & Order True Crime	Judge Judith Stein		
2018	Liza on Demand	Seymour’s Wife		
2018	Hotel Du Loone	Mrs. Moorehouse		
2019	The Morning Show	Woman		
2020	Better Things	Manager		
2020	Smartphone Theater	Lorraine/Janice/Woman	Also produced segment “A Conversation with Mark Rydell”	
2020	Boned	Barbara Silvers		
2022	Smothered	Goldie		
2024	Nobody Wants This	Bessie		
2024	The Lincoln Lawyer	Judge Mary Elizabeth Mercer		
2025	Monster	Clerk		
2026	9-1-1	Dessie		

== Theater ==
- 1987 - The Traveler
