= Roots of Knowledge =

Stained glass display at Utah Valley University in Orem, Utah, United States

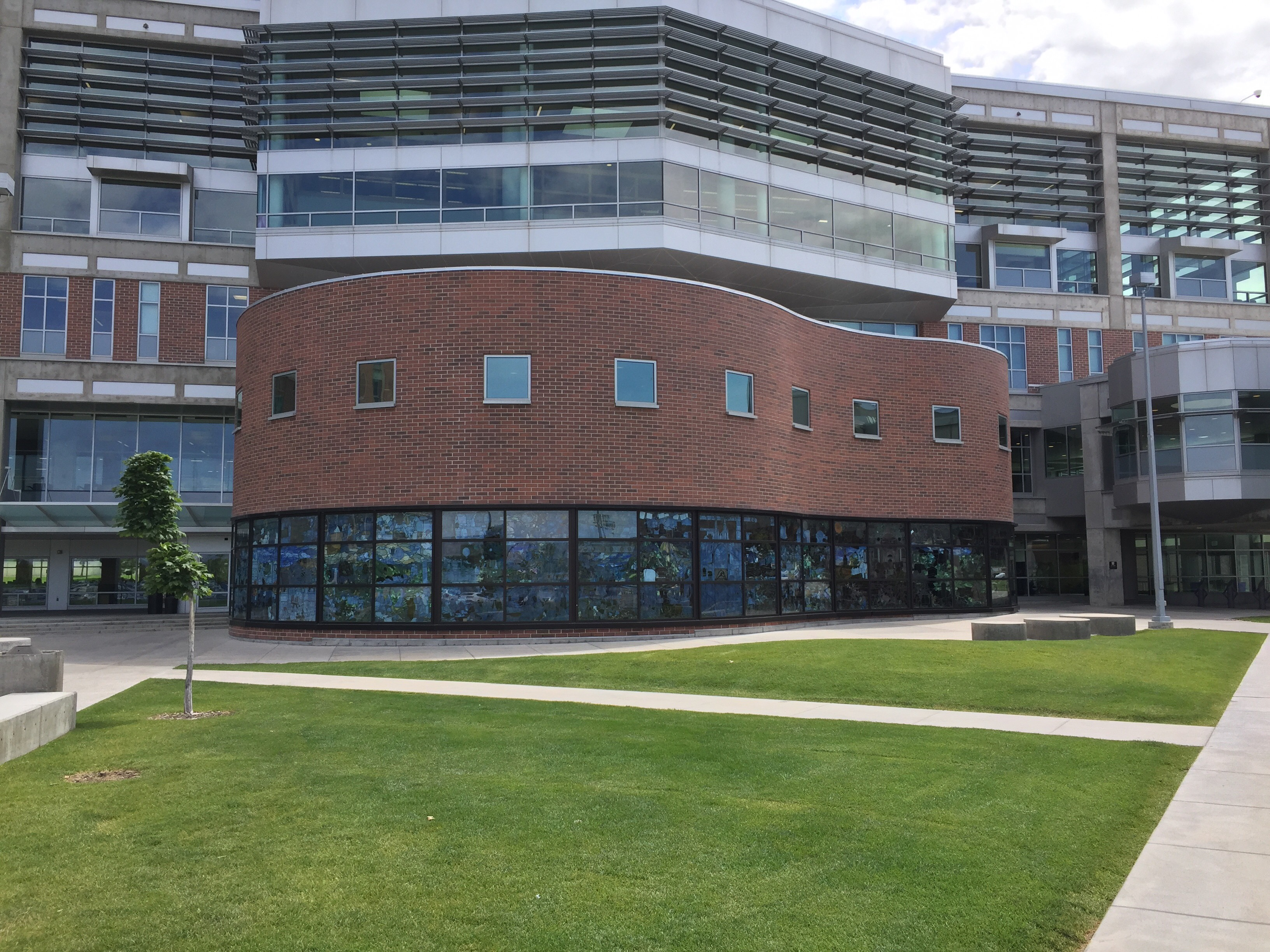
- View of the stained glass from the outside of the Fulton Library.
- Artist: Tom Holdman; Cameron Oscarson
- Completion date: November 18, 2016
- Medium: Stained glass
- Subject: History of knowledge
- Dimensions: 3.0 m × 61 m (10 ft × 200 ft)
- Location: Bingham Gallery, Fulton Library, Utah Valley University, Orem, Utah
- Coordinates: 40.2807751°N 111.7169962°W
- Owner: Utah Valley University
- Website: www.uvu.edu/rootsofknowledge/

Roots of Knowledge is a permanent stained glass display completed in 2016 at Utah Valley University (UVU) in Orem, Utah, United States. The creation of the exhibit was designed and overseen by stained glass artists Tom Holdman and Cameron Oscarson. It took over 12 years and cost US$4.5 million to complete.

== Description ==
The Roots of Knowledge is a permanent stained glass exhibit in the Ira A. and Mary Lou Fulton Library at Utah Valley University in Orem, Utah in the United States. It is 200 feet (61 m) long, about 10 feet (3.0 m) tall, and comprises 80 separate panes. Each of the panels was handcrafted from over 43,000 pieces of glass depicting part of the progress of human knowledge during recorded history. The exhibit depicts both religious and secular events and objects.

In addition to the stained, blown, fused, and carved glass used for most of the window, other objects were incorporated into the display. These included a shark's tooth, part of the Berlin Wall, a Purple Heart medal, a $5 bill from 1777, and glass from NASA. Part of the window incorporates a replication of the oldest stained glass known: a window created in 647 AD at The Abbey Church of Saint Peter and Saint Paul, Monkwearmouth–Jarrow in England.

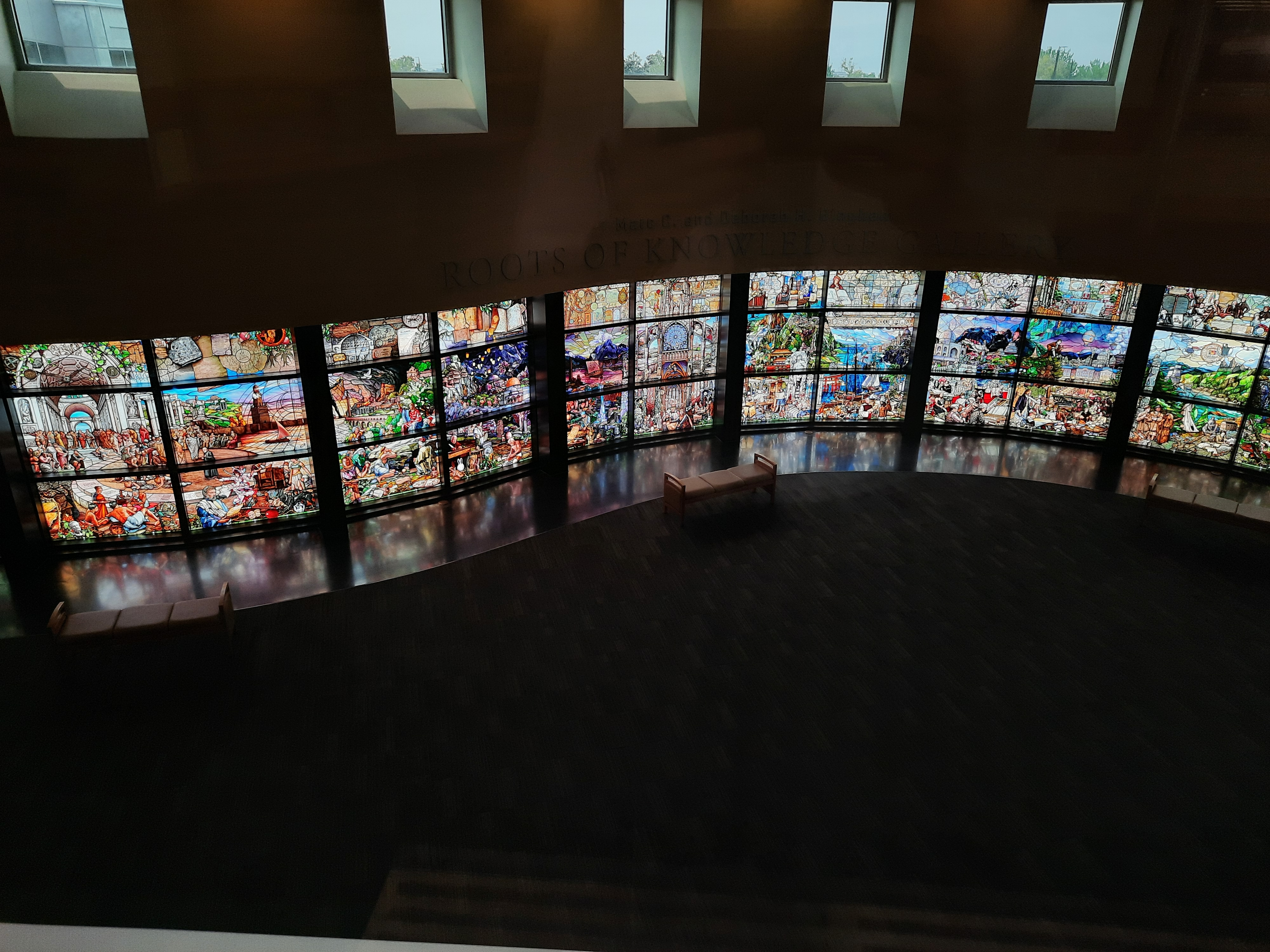
A view of some of the Roots of Knowledge windows as seen from a higher floor in the library

== History ==
The idea to create the stained glass exhibit began in 2004. For the next 12 years, Holdman and Oscarson worked to design and create the 80 panels included in the final exhibit. Each panel was handcrafted by the original designers, Tom Holdman and Cameron Oscarson, who worked with over 350 student artists, 26 faculty members, and 40 other artists during the construction of the exhibit. Lead designers include Nick Lawyer, Trevor Petersen, and Dallin Orr.

The US$4.5 million project was funded through private donations, including through sponsorships of individual pieces of glass. It was officially unveiled on November 18, 2016, as part of the 75th anniversary of the university.

== Reception ==
The installation was described as a "tour de force" by the curator of ceramics and glass at the Victoria and Albert Museum in London. The windows have been compared to those in several European cathedrals, including the Cologne Cathedral in Germany, Sainte-Chapelle in France, and York Minster in England. The Utah Education Network worked with Holdman and UVU to create curriculum and field trips based on the project.

The project is the subject of a one-hour documentary created for PBS by Lee Groberg.
