= The Whole Truth (TV series) =

- Genre: Legal drama
- Created by: Tom Donaghy
- Starring: Rob Morrow; Maura Tierney; Eamonn Walker; Sean Wing; Anthony Ruivivar; Christine Adams
- Composer: Sean Callery
- Country of origin: United States
- Original language: English
- No. of seasons: 1
- No. of episodes: 13

Production
- Executive producers: Jerry Bruckheimer; Jonathan Littman
- Production location: Los Angeles
- Running time: 42 minutes
- Production companies: Jerry Bruckheimer Television; Bonanza Productions; Warner Bros. Television

Original release
- Network: ABC
- Release: September 22 – December 1, 2010

The Whole Truth is an American legal drama television series that ran on ABC from September 22, 2010, to December 1, 2010. Episodes aired on Wednesdays at 10:00 pm ET/9:00 pm CT. The show, which starred Rob Morrow and Maura Tierney, chronicled legal cases from the points of view of both the prosecution and the defense; it was set in New York City and shot in Los Angeles.

ABC canceled The Whole Truth, in October after four episodes had aired. Initially it planned to air the remaining episodes. Two months later, the network pulled the show from its schedule with seven episodes unaired. The unaired episodes later aired on the Nine Network in Australia and in the Netherlands on NET 5 in 2012 and in Brazil on SBT.

== Cast and characters ==
=== Main cast ===
- Rob Morrow as Jimmy Brogan
- Ellen Gerstien as Tina
- Maura Tierney as Kathryn Peale
- Eamonn Walker as Sr. ADA Terrence "Edge" Edgecomb
- Sean Wing as Chad Griffin
- Anthony Ruivivar as Alejo Salazar
- Christine Adams as Lena Boudreaux

=== Recurring ===
- Stephanie Lemelin as Rhonda (13 episodes)
- Jack McGee as Stan Klotz (2 episodes)
- John Aylward as Judge Jeremiah Studley (2 episodes)
- Christine Healy as Judge Anna Mae Harmon (2 episodes)

=== Guest stars ===
- Judd Hirsch as Judge Wright (1 episode)
- Allison Smith as Corinne Sellards (1 episode)
- J. Kenneth Campbell as Larry Combs (1 episode)
- Skyler Day as Brianna Sellards (1 episode)
- Paul Greene as Kevin (1 episode)
- Shane Coffey as John Sellards (1 episode)
- Grey Damon as Todd Engler (1 episode)

== Production ==
When ABC announced its 2010 fall schedule in May 2010, The Whole Truth was set to star Morrow and Joely Richardson in the two lead roles. Richardson filmed the original pilot After the show was picked up, Richardson dropped out for personal reasons and was replaced by Maura Tierney, who went on to re-film all the Katie Peale scenes from the pilot. Tierney took on the role in addition to her recurring role on Rescue Me.

On-location production began in August: the show, set in New York City, was shot in Los Angeles, with Los Angeles City Hall, for example, standing in for the New York City Criminal Court.

== Episodes ==
No.	Title	Directed by	Written by	Original release date	Prod. code	U.S. viewers (millions)
1	"Pilot"	Alex Graves	Tom Donaghy	September 22, 2010 (US); January 21, 2012 (Netherlands)	296775	4.9
Attorneys Jimmy Brogan and Kathryn Peale argue of the case of a teacher having an affair with one of his students and then murdering her.
2	"Thicker Than Water"	Christine Moore	Tom Donaghy	September 29, 2010 (US); January 28, 2012 (Netherlands)	2J5752	4.6
Jimmy and Kathryn face off in the case of a woman suspected of rolling her wheelchair-using father off the Staten Island Ferry.
3	"Judicial Discretion"	Rob Bailey	Kevin J. Hynes & Hannah Shakespeare	October 6, 2010 (US); February 4, 2012 (Netherlands)	2J5755	4.4
When a beloved judge (Judd Hirsch) is charged with murder he asks Jimmy to represent him. When a wiretap on a drug lord, which was approved by the judge, reveals a larger conspiracy Kathryn considers filing charges in federal court for murder for hire.
4	"True Confessions"	Eagle Egilsson	Ian Biederman & Jordana Lewis Jaffe	October 20, 2010 (US); February 11, 2012 (Netherlands)	2J5754	4.5
An Upper West Side couple is found lying in a pool of blood in their home. Their 16-year-old son is accused of their murder. After an 11-hour interrogation the boy confesses. When Jimmy discovers a gap in the video recording of the interrogation he attempts to get the confession thrown out.
5	"When Cougars Attack"	Ken Fink	Story by : Ian Biederman; Teleplay by : Jonathan Kidd & Sonya Winton	October 27, 2010 (US); February 18, 2012 (Netherlands)	2J5756	4.4
Jimmy and Edge again face off when a 45-year-old fashion designer (Annabella Sciorra) is accused of murdering another of her younger boyfriends. Jimmy got her acquitted of the previous murder charge three years before. Kathryn and Lena pose for a "sexy lawyer" magazine spread.
6	"Liars"	Jeffrey Hunt	Jeffrey Lieber & Jordana Lewis Jaffe	December 1, 2010 (US); February 25, 2012 (Netherlands)	2J5758	3.6
A dentist is found dead in his chair and his "Stepford wife" is accused of murder. Complications arise when it is discovered that the victim was doing more than just dentistry at work.
7	"Uncanny"	Karen Gaviola	Hannah Shakespeare	March 3, 2012 (Netherlands); May 28, 2012 (Australia)	2J5753	TBA
Paul Braun (Harold Perrineau), who claims to be a psychic, is arrested because he knows too many intimate details about a homicide.
8	"Cold Case"	Gwyneth Horder-Payton	Ian Biederman	March 10, 2012 (Netherlands); June 18, 2012 (Australia)	2J5757	TBA
After a comatose woman dies, Kathryn brings a new charge of murder for the crime - now 10 years old.
9	"Young Love"	Karen Gaviola	Ed Zuckerman	March 17, 2012 (Netherlands); July 25, 2012 (Australia)	2J5759	TBA
Kathryn charges a young couple with manslaughter in the shaken death of an infant - while Jimmy and Alejo each represent one of the defendants.
10	"Perfect Witness"	Nathan Hope	Jeffrey Lieber & Jonathan Kidd & Sonya Winton	March 24, 2012 (Netherlands); July 3, 2012 (Australia)	2J5760	TBA
The case against an accused killer from Jimmy's old neighborhood, Hell's Kitchen, rests on the memory of a child with a photographic memory.
11	"Lost in translation"	Paul McCrane	Tom Donaghy & Kevin J. Hynes	March 31, 2012 (Netherlands)	2J5761	TBA
Jimmy represents an old friend from law school who's been charged with arson and murder. But a Chinese gang and an Italian mobster are also involved.
12	"The State Calls Kathryn Peale"	Tucker Gates	Paul J. Levine	April 7, 2012 (Netherlands); July 10, 2012 (Australia)	2J5762	TBA
Jimmy represents an ex-con implicated in a drive-by shooting of a defense attorney. It turns out, however, that the target may have been Kathryn.
13	"The End"	Rob Bailey	Sonya Winton & Jonathan Kidd	April 14, 2012 (Netherlands); July 17, 2012 (Australia)	2J5763	TBA
Kathryn & Jimmy relate the story of their first case opposing each other. Meanwhile, a retiring judge offers Kathryn an opportunity that's hard to refuse.

== Reception ==
Before the show's premiere, Matthew Gilbert of The Boston Globe said, "Having seen the original Richardson pilot, which was re-filmed to add in Tierney, I can tell you that Tierney saves the show from near worthlessness. She brings a passion, a finely gauged sense of humor, and a strong chemistry with costar Rob Morrow that were missing before." In general, though, the show has received mixed reviews, with Metacritic assigning it a score of 57.

According to Joe Flint of the Los Angeles Times, the "solid" ratings of the second-season premiere of Modern Family and "disappointing numbers" for the second-season premiere of Cougar Town were followed by "just 4.9 million" viewers for The Whole Truth. In comparison, the legal comedy-drama The Defenders, in the same time slot as The Whole Truth, was the "highest-rated new show for the night, with 12.1 million viewers."
