= The Parker Andersons =

- Also known as: Amelia Parker
- Genre: Sitcom
- Created by: Frank Van Keeken
- Written by: Sadiya Durrani; Anthony Q. Farrell; Amanda Joy; Murry Peeters; Ian Steaman; Jay Vaidya; Ian Malone
- Directed by: James Allodi; Melanie Orr; Cory Bowles; Anthony Q. Farrell; Warren P. Sonoda; Conor Casey; Lyndon Casey; Kelly Fyffe-Marshall; Alicia K. Harris
- Starring: Arnold Pinnock; Kate Hewlett; Millie Davis
- Countries of origin: United States; Canada
- Original language: English
- No. of seasons: 1
- No. of episodes: 20

Production
- Executive producers: Anthony Q. Farrell; Andra Johnson Duke; Michael A. Dunn; Matt Hornburg; Carrie Paupst Shaughnessy; Frank van Keeken; Yolanda Yott
- Producer: Jim Corston
- Editors: Brigitte Rabazo; Luke Sargeant
- Running time: 30 minutes
- Production company: MarbleMedia

Original release
- Network: Super Channel (Canada); BYUtv (U.S.)
- Release: April 3, 2021

The Parker Andersons and Amelia Parker are a pair of related television sitcoms, which premiered in 2021 on Super Channel. The shows both depict a blended family living in the suburbs of Chicago following the remarriage of widower Tony Parker (Arnold Pinnock) and divorced single mother Cleo Anderson (Kate Hewlett); while they share interconnections of character and storyline, The Parker Andersons centres on the whole family, while Amelia Parker focuses more specifically on the particular experiences of Tony's teenage daughter Amelia (Millie Davis), who is still coping with the death of her mother and struggling with the anxiety disorder of selective mutism.

The cast also includes Agape Mngomezulu, Akiel Julien, Charlie Zeltzer, Devin Ceccheto, Chris River, Sandy Jobin-Bevans, Jaida Grace, Kimberly Huie, Arista Arhin, and Madison Brydges.

The series is filmed in Toronto, Ontario, and production commenced in October 2020. In advance of production, writer and showrunner Anthony Q. Farrell, who was already working with Marblemedia on the series Overlord and the Underwoods, was brought in to rewrite the scripts to ensure that they more authentically represented the show's Black characters.

The shows premiered on Super Channel Heart & Home on April 19, 2021. They are also carried in the United States by BYUtv.

== Controversy ==
The series launch was a topic of some controversy in the Canadian television industry, when Radheyan Simonpillai's article in Now about the series launch included the statement that BYUtv series "couldn’t feature characters who are clearly identified as queer" due to the Church of Jesus Christ of Latter-day Saints' views on LGBTQ sexuality. The controversy roped in both The Parker Andersons/Amelia Parker and Overlord and the Underwoods. Within days, BYUtv responded with a statement that "As a young network committed to bringing together religious and non-religious audiences, BYUtv is learning and exploring ways to partner with diverse content creators, writers and talent to implement meaningful co-viewing experiences for our target audience (children 8-15 and their parents). While BYUtv has not referenced LGBTQ+ topics and characters in the five original scripted series it has aired to date, we desire to address subjects – including LGBTQ+ – that are important to our growing and diverse audience. There are no policies that would exclude the network from including characters who identify as LGBTQ+, and BYUtv is exploring ways to do so," and Marblemedia indicated that The Parker Andersons and Amelia Parker will include LGBTQ-related storylines in future seasons.

== Awards ==
Farrell received a nomination for Best Direction in a Family Series at the 2021 Directors Guild of Canada awards, for the episode "Father & Sons". Further nominations for the WGC Screenwriting Awards were received by Ian Steaman, Amanda Joy, and Murry Peeters for their respective scripts "Father & Sons," "Joy," and "This Wasn't the Plan."
