= Arnold Pinnock =

Canadian actor (born 1967)

- Born: December 10, 1967 (age 58); Birmingham, England, UK
- Occupations: Actor, Writer, Producer
- Years active: 1998–present

Arnold Pinnock (born December 10, 1967) is a Canadian actor who is perhaps best known for his appearance as Paul Greebie, Casey's guidance counselor, in Family's Life with Derek.

Pinnock was born in Birmingham, England to an African-Caribbean family, but they moved to Ontario in later years. His career began with sketch comedy at Toronto's Second City Mainstage before he moved on to television and film.

He created, wrote, starred in and produced the 2022 CBC and BET series The Porter, about the railway sleeping car porters who created North America's first Black labour union, the Brotherhood of Sleeping Car Porters.

== Filmography ==
=== Film ===
- Bless the Child (2000) as Alley Officer
- Bait (2000) as Convict
- Apartment Hunting (2000) as Dean
- Judgment (2001)
- XChange (2001) as Dickerson
- Down to Earth (2001) as Joe Guy
- Judgment (2001) as David Sands
- Exit Wounds (2001) as Alan Morris
- Paid In Full (2002) as Wiry Man
- Cypher (2002) as Pilot In Mensroom
- Against the Ropes (2004) as Heavyweight
- New York Minute (2004) as Big Shirl's Male Beautician
- Assault on Precinct 13 (2005) as Carlyle
- Left Behind: World at War (2005) as Bruce Barnes
- Get Rich or Die Tryin (2005) as Detective #2
- Lars and the Real Girl (2007) as Baxter
- P2 (2007) as Cop #2
- The Incredible Hulk (2008) as Soldier #2
- The Echo (2008) as Officer Cole
- The Cry of the Owl (2009) as Detective Anderson
- Dog Pound (2010) as Phillips
- Carrie (2013) as OB Nurse (uncredited)
- Cold Pursuit (2019) as The Eskimo
- The Knight Before Christmas (2019) as Officer Stevens
- The Well (2025) as Paul Devine
- Steal Away (2025) as Washington

=== Television ===
- Must Be Santa (1999, TV Movie) as Floyd Court / Santa
- The City (1999) as Tyrone Meeks
- The War Next Door (2000) as Neil
- Lord Have Mercy! (2003–2004) as Dwight Gooding
- Twitches (2005, TV Movie) as David Barnes
- Beautiful People (2005–2006) as Toby Sayles
- Life with Derek (2005–2009) as Paul Greebie
- Twitches Too (2007, TV Movie) as David Barnes
- Billable Hours (2007–2008) as Vic Laghm
- Stoked (2009) as Johnny
- Grey's Anatomy (2010)
- Lost Girl (2010) as Bertram
- The Listener (2009–2011) as George Ryder
- Combat Hospital (2011) as Commander Will Royal
- Wingin' It (2011) as Artie Jackson
- Air Farce Not the New Year's Eve Special (2012–2013)
- Republic of Doyle (2013–2014) as Marco Long
- A Day Late and a Dollar Short (2014, TV Movie) as Al
- Beauty & The Beast (2014–2015) as Agent Thomas
- Once Upon a Time (2016) as Poole
- Travelers (2016) as Walt Forbes
- PAW Patrol (2016–2019) as the Flight Controller
- Altered Carbon as Hemmingway
- The Expanse (2020) as Morris
- The Parker Andersons/Amelia Parker (2021) as Tony Parker
- The Porter
- Plan B
