= Lee Groberg =

American filmmaker

Lee B. Groberg (born 1951) is a documentary filmmaker and Latter-day Saint. Many of his films focus on Latter-day Saint history, while others focus on Utah history or the Olympics.

Groberg was born and raised in Farr West, Utah.

His first films were industrial films made for such organizations as Nu Skin. His first documentary was Winter: the St. Paul/Sapporo connection. In 1991 he made American Gunmaker: The John M. Browning Story. Many of Groberg's films have had T. C. Christensen as the cinematographer. Later, Mark Goodman became the main cinematographer working with Groberg. Groberg also made a documentary about the Roots of Knowledge stained glass installation at Utah Valley University.

Groberg and his wife Jeanene live in Bountiful, Utah. They are the parents of seven children.

== Sources ==
- lds film bio
- Groberg Films website
- Lee Groberg at IMDb
- includes a listing of Groberg among LDS film directors^{[usurped]}
