= Twitches (novel series) =

Children's novel series

T*Witches
- Author: H. B. Gilmour & Randi Reisfeld
- Cover artist: David Loew and Joyce White
- Country: United States
- Language: English
- Publisher: Scholastic Press (Scholastic Corporation)
- Published: 2001–2004
- Media type: Paperback
- Preceded by: Clueless

T*Witches is an American children's fantasy novel series by H. B. Gilmour and Randi Reisfeld which were published between 2001 and 2004 by Scholastic Press, a subsidiary of Scholastic Corporation.

The cover art and design of the book series was done by David Loew and Joyce White. The series was titled Witches Hexengirls for their releases in German and French.

Its first book, The Power of Two, was adapted into two television films; Twitches in 2005 and Twitches Too in 2007, which were broadcast on Disney Channel.

== Plots ==
The 10-book series focuses on long lost twin sisters who discovered that they were witches of Coventry Island. Camryn "Cam" Alicia Barnes, also known as Apolla DuBaer, is a popular and preppy teen with a Sun amulet. Alexandra "Alex" Nicole Fielding, also known as Artemis DuBaer, is a gothic teen who constantly changes the color of her hair, and wears the matching amulet of the Moon. The twins were separated on October 31, 1986. Years later, the two meet up as schoolgirls with ESP; Cam can see the future and Alex can read people's minds. Their legal guardians are the young witch Ileana and the mischievous, aging warlock Karsh. The twins' birth parents are Coventry Island's witch and warlock, Miranda and Aron DuBaer. The twins' birth was foretold by one of their ancestors years ago. The prophecy is called the La Prophetic Aux Yeux Gris (The Prophecy of the Gray Eyes). The two lived completely different lives miles away from each other, not knowing of their powers until they met in The Power of Two.

== Novels ==
1. The Power of Two (2001) [ISBN 0-439-24070-0]
2. Building a Mystery (2001) [ISBN 0-439-24071-9]
3. Seeing is Deceiving (2001) [ISBN 0-439-24072-7]
4. Dead Wrong (2002) [ISBN 0-439-24073-5]
5. Don't Think Twice (2002) [ISBN 0-439-24074-3]
6. Double Jeopardy (2002) [ISBN 0-439-24075-1]
7. Kindred Spirits (2003) [ISBN 0-439-47219-9]
8. The Witch Hunters (2003) [ISBN 0-439-49227-0]
9. Split Decision (2003) [ISBN 0-439-49230-0]
10. Destiny's Twins (2004) [ISBN 0-439-49232-7]

=== The Power of Two ===
Camryn and Alex are twin witches that were raised far apart by adoptive parents, each totally unaware of the existence of the other. That is, until their fourteenth year when a tragedy brings them together. Who are they? What are these scary witchy powers they've hidden from themselves and others? Why have they been brought together now? And by who?

=== Building a Mystery ===
Twin witches Cam and Alex couldn't be more different (Cam is a pretty and cheerful Ms. Popular, Alex is a sullen punk girl), but what they've got in common are their witchy powers! And when a cute, mysterious new boy moves into their neighborhood, those powers are put to the test like never before. Could the boy be connected to the twins' past, which they are still learning about? And can the girls hold back the evil that surrounds them?

=== Seeing is Deceiving ===
Cam's and Alex's powers are getting in sync, and the twins can't help themselves. They're reading people's minds, using magick on the soccer field. It's bringing them closer together. But it's forcing Cam and her bff, Beth, apart.

When Alex sneaks out to an all-night party, she suddenly finds Beth - and herself - in terrible danger. Thantos, the evil one who wants the twins eliminated, has taken Beth hostage. Must Alex sacrifice herself to save her sister and friend?

=== Dead Wrong ===
Alex and Cam return to Alex's hometown in Montana to settle some scores. Numero Uno: Someone is trying to block Alex from being adopted by Cam's family. Could it be Alex's deadbeat stepdad? Numero Dos: Alex's bud Evan is being blamed for a school death threat. When stepdad turns up Six Feet Under, the girls must power up for another battle with the forces of evil.

=== Don't Think Twice ===
Cam and Alex are becoming more comfortable with their powers and desire to help – or so they think. They are receiving mysterious letters they think refer to their mother Miranda. What’s more, Cam is getting urgent visions of a slight figure in the snow and Alex’s telepathy is breaking in to Cam’s friend Bree’s thoughts way more than is normal. Can they figure out what these visions and thoughts mean, and what is causing their magic to go on the fritz?

Meanwhile on Coventry Island, Fredo is on trial for his crimes. None other than Lord Thantos, absent from the island these past 15 years, is representing his defense. Karsh and Ileana represent the people, and where Karsh is calm in his presentation of evidence, Ileana’s hotheadedness may just reveal more than anyone ever expected.

=== Double Jeopardy ===
Camryn and Alex finally meet their birth mother. Unfortunately, she is physically and mentally broken; far from the powerful witch they imagined her to be. As more and more family secrets are revealed, the girls discover that there is a heavy price to pay for these secrets, one which neither they nor Ileana can prevent being paid.

=== Kindred Spirits ===
Welcome to Coventry Island, a lush, mystical land that is home to a powerful community of witches and warlocks. It is here that teen witches Cam and Alex were born. And now, the twins have returned to Coventry to say a final farewell to their beloved guardian Karsh. But when the girls visit their ancestral home on the island, they discover there are many truths to be revealed about their past. Their mother, Miranda, has secrets to share. And then there's the group of teen witches and warlocks who Cam and Alex meet. Will these teens help the twins...or are they up to something more sinister?

=== The Witch Hunters ===
In the aftermath of an unsettled trip to Coventry Island, Cam and Alex cannot rest until they find out why one of the Six Pack is showing off some strange powers, and why a stranger to Marble Bay wants to deprive its people of magic.

=== Split Decision ===
It's summer. And for the first time since they've met, Cam and Alex are doing their own things. Alex is chilling in Marble Bay with her sweetie, Cade. And Cam is in Coventry with her warlock hottie, Shane. However, despite their much needed vacation from themselves, Cam and Alex find their magick very weak while separated, resulting in evil settling in with no intention of leaving.

=== Destiny's Twins ===
Cam and Alex are on the brink of Initiation—until someone evil sets out to stop them from succeeding. Can the twins still become true witches?

It's the moment they've been waiting for. Cam and Alex are about to be initiated. In just a month, the girls will be welcomed as full-fledged witches in a blowout bash on Coventry.

But first they've got to prove themselves witch-worthy. The twins must complete a series of tough magick tests. And they've got an extra-credit exam: someone sketchy is out to stop them both from succeeding. It's up to the twins to decide how to get rid of this creep. But they'd better choose wisely. Because nothing less than their destiny is at stake.

== Characters ==
=== Witches and Warlocks ===
- Alexandra Nicole Fielding/Artemis DuBaer is the older of the twins. She was born as the moon was setting on October 31, 1986. She wears the moon amulet. Artemis, whom Alex was named after, was the Greek mythological moon goddess, and Apollo's twin sister. Alex is the spunky twin with a cynical personality. She grew up in Crow Creek, Montana and is an alumna of Crow Creek Regional High School's Class of 2004. Her closest friends are Lucinda and Evan, and her boyfriends throughout the series are Cade Richman and Andy Yatz. Her uniquely supernatural abilities consist of incredibly strong telekinesis, empathy, telepathy, hyperactive sense of smell and hearing, remote viewing, cold manipulation, and precognition.
- Camryn Alicia Barnes/Apolla DuBaer is the younger of the twins. She was born as the sun was rising on October 31, 1986. She wears the sun amulet. Apollo, whom Cam was named after, was the Greek mythological sun god, and Artemis' twin brother. Cam is the preppy, popular twin with an upbeat personality. She grew up in suburban Marble Bay, Massachusetts. She is an alumna of Marble Bay High School's Class of 2004. She is part of a social circle of six, and her boyfriends throughout the series are Shane Antayus Wright and Jason Weissman. Her specialized supernatural abilities include exceptionally strong empathy, telepathy, clairvoyance, hyperactive sight, blinding people temporarily, premonition, and pyrokinesis.
- Ileana DuBaer is a cousin to the twins and their Guardian. Her parents are Thantos DuBaer and Beatrice Hazlitt. After her mother died giving birth to her and Thantos abandoned her, Karsh Antayus, a distant relative of her mother, and close friend to her uncle Aron and grandfather Nathanial, reared her. Her mother had little or no power, though her mothers ancestors were quite powerful as is Ileana. Ileana herself is a very powerful witch until she finds out who her father is. Soon, Ileana recovers her powers and remains a powerful witch. Ileana is sometimes self-centered and has a temper but she is caring and dependable, and at heart pure, unlike her father. Her boyfriend is Brice Stanley. Her specialized powers are telekinesis, precognition, hyperactive sight, levitation, shape-shifting, telepathy.
- Lord Karsh Antayus is the guardian of Ileana DuBaer and a mentor to the twins. He guided many witches and wizards and saved the twins lives many times which resulted in his death. He had separated the twins at birth by Ileana's command, but 14 years later brought them together.
- Miranda Martine-DuBaer is the twins' birth mother. She wears a sun and moon amulet. After the birth of the twins and her husband's death, she lost almost all of her magical abilities and she disappeared. No one knew where she was except Thantos. She thought her daughters were dead too, until fourteen years later when Thantos decided to tell her they were alive. After she met them for the first time, she went back to Coventry Island and tried to connect to her home again. She did not know that Thantos was using her until he paralyzed her and Ileana trying to get Cam on his side. Her magical abilities include extremely powerful telekinesis, empathy, telepathy, precognition, astral projection, postcognition, and remote viewing.
- Thantos DuBaer is Ileana's father and an uncle to the twins. He owns a multimillion, multinational business and is extremely powerful in both worlds. He practices dark magic and was always jealous of his brother, Aron. He has tried to kill the twins numerous times, but failed. He is in love with Miranda, and never gotten over that it was Aron, she married. Toward the end of the series he asked Miranda to marry him, but she said no. In Book 10, he was to be ignored by everyone on Coventry Island at the end of the twins' initiation. His known powers are cold and ice manipulation, telepathy, hyperactive sight, smell, and hearing, and blinding people temporarily.
- Aron DuBaer is the twins' father and the middle brother of Thantos and Fredo. From what we know, he was very powerful and was a generous wizard. His younger brother, Fredo, killed him, trying to please Thantos the day his twin daughters were born. The twins were then passed into Karsh and Ileana's care, who delegated the task to human foster parents. His known powers are telepathy, remote viewing, hyperactive sight, smell, and hearing, clairvoyance, and shape-shifting.
- Fredo DuBaer is the younger brother of Thantos and Aron. He has little power and is in the Coventry Island jail for killing his brother, Aron. He has lived in the shadows of Thantos most of his life and even tried to kill the twins for Thantos. He has two sons, Vey and Tsuris DuBaer. His known powers are telepathy and shape-shifting.
- Vey and Tsuris DuBaer are the sons of Fredo and cousins to the twins. They are only half-warlock; their mother, Coco Lopez, is human. They killed Karsh but have not been tried for his death. They were raised by their mother and are not very bright. Their known powers: They can trust their powers to get through a porthole.

=== The Adoptive Families ===
- David Barnes is a lawyer. He knew since Cam was a baby that she was a witch. Dave was a Sensitive, a person with powers who is not a witch or warlock; and when he adopted Camryn, he became a Protector. David had psychokinesis and precognition but hasn't used any of his other powers since he adopted Cam.
- Emily Barnes is an interior designer and had no idea that the twins are witches because she is a mortal. She finds out Camryn is a witch after Cam and Alex meet. She is very fun and easygoing, and is very supportive of Camryn.
- Dylan Michael Barnes is the younger adoptive brother of Cam and the biological child of David and Emily. He and Alex hit it off right from the beginning. Karsh hinted to Dave in Book 2 that Dylan may be a Sensitive like his father once was. Karsh is quoted as saying "That inept but good hearted boy of yours, David. Dylan the boy has possibilities".
- Sara Fielding is Alex's adoptive mother and Protector who dies of lung cancer when Alex is 14. Her powers are unknown. However, it is noted through her friend Mrs. Bass that Sara did dabble in the craft. After she left her husband Isaac Fielding, her home had been foreclosed on, and she and Alex were forced to move into a trailer in Crow Creek, Montana. When people had come out of the woodwork demanding money they claimed Issac owed them, Sara was forced to work two jobs — daytime at the laundry in town and nights at a greasy diner — but even then she could barely keep up.
- Isaac Fielding: The adoptive father of Alexandra. Isaac left Alex and Sara when Alex was almost 8 years old. In Book 4, it is revealed Isaac had found out Alex had powers and wanted to use her to receive some illegal money, so Sara threw him out. In anger over it he stole Sara's savings and left her with huge debts. Sara told Alex that he left them in the hopes that Alex would never seek Isaac out. He showed up 4 months after Sara died trying to get Alex back, but was killed by Fredo.

=== Alex's Best Friends ===
- Evan Fretts is one of Alexandra's best friends.
- Lucinda Carmelson is one of Alexandra's best friends.

=== Camryn's Six Pack ===
- Elisabeth "Beth/Bethie" Fish is Camryn's best friend in her "Six Pack" group of Marble Bay best friends. She often feels left out after Camryn and Alex reunite.
- Brianna "Bree" Waxman, member of the Six Pack and best friend to Kristen. Bree's father is a big-time, executive Hollywood producer. In Book 5, the twins learn of a dangerous secret Bree has been keeping and use their powers to help her.
- Kristen Hsu, member of the Six Pack and best friend to Bree. Kristen is a Chinese-American with long, ebony hair, who is artistic and into computer graphics. In Book 5, she tries to get the twins to learn Bree's secret without betraying Bree's confidence.
- Sukari Woodward, member of the Six Pack. Sukari is described as a brainiac, a science buff, and cocoa-skinned. Sukari is revealed to be a Sensitive, but her gifts vanish at the end of Book 8.
- Amanda "Manda" Carter, member of the Six Pack. Amanda is described as a red-headed, curly-haired teenager, who is kind to Alex from the start. Amanda is interested in the cosmos and "witchy" stuff.

=== Love Interests ===
- Jason Weissman, a love-struck senior in Marble Bay, who only has eyes for Camryn. Jason accidentally ends up captured by the Furies after he follows Camryn to Coventry Island without her knowledge and later leaves early for college on a basketball scholarship.
- Shane A. Wright, a warlock from Coventry Island, who keeps pulling Camryn back into his morally grey life.
- Cade Richman, a mortal and one of Alex's love interests.

=== Ancestors ===
- Jacob Dubaer, son of Ephram, was a powerful physician with unique gifts. He would eventually found Coventry Island with his wife and child, a grey-eyed boy.
- Abigail Antayus was a prominent healer during the Salem Witch trials. After the death of her husband, Samuel Stetson, Jacob pursued her, romantically; in retaliation for Abigail rejecting him, Jacob accused her of witchcraft, until she was killed. Abigail cursed the DuBaer line and left behind three children, Providence Hazlitt (nee Antayus), Marcus Antayus, and Mary Nevins (nee Antayus). Ileana descends from Providence's descendants and Lord Karsh from Marcus' descendants.
- Nathaniel DuBaer, father of Thantos, Aron, and Fredo, was the grandfather of the twins, Ileana, and Fredo's sons. Lord Karsh was present when Nathaniel was killed in the caves beneath Coventry.
- Leila Tavisham, mother of Thantos, Aron, and Fredo, was the grandmother of the twins, Ileana, and Fredo's sons. Her spirit is summoned a few times throughout the series, often revealing unwelcomed truths to those who summoned her.

=== The Furies ===
- Sersee Tremain is the leader of a Coventry-based, trio of witches, who call themselves the Furies. Sersee is powerful, arrogant, and dangerous, but desperately seeks approval from Thantos after being passed over by him, Lord Karsh, and others for Initiate training.
- Epee, one of the Furies, is a blind follower of Sersee.
- Michaelina, one of the Furies, has fluctuating loyalties and sometimes helps out the twins.

=== Minor Characters ===
- Brice Stanley A movie star who is also a warlock. It is revealed he studied under Thantos, but his loyalties are unclear.
- Tonya Gladstone is a student at Marble Bay and sort of friends with Camryn's social circle.
- Marleigh Cooper is a celebrated teenage pop singer who is friends with Camryn's social circle. Marleigh and Cam share a different kind of friendship and silently agree that they cannot be friends at first sight. Cam's classmate, Tonya Gladstone, wants to use Marleigh for profit. When Marleigh disappears, Alex helps Cam find her. Cam and Alex rescue her when she is alone and in danger of losing herself and her place in society.

== Settings ==
- Marble Bay, Massachusetts: Music & More Store, Marble Bay High School, Cambridge, Boston University, Endicott Drive, Webster Road, Barneses residence, Gladstone residence, Hilton Head Island, South Carolina, Pie in the Sky pizzeria
- Crow Creek, Montana: Crow Creek Regional High School, Big Sky Resort, Big Sky, Fielding trailer park
- Coventry Island: Off the coast of Wisconsin, in Lake Superior.
