= Joshua Harto =

American actor, television producer and writer (born 1979)

- Born: Joshua Denver Harto; January 9, 1979 (age 47); Huntington, West Virginia, U.S.
- Other name: Josh Harto
- Occupations: Actor, television producer, writer
- Years active: 1996–present
- Spouse: Liz W. Garcia (m. 2008)

Joshua Denver Harto (born January 9, 1979) is an American actor, television producer and writer.

== Early life and education ==
Harto was born in Huntington, West Virginia. He is a graduate of the Dreyfoos School of the Arts.

== Career ==
As an actor, he has guest starred in a number of notable television series, including American Dreams, Carnivàle, Crossing Jordan, JAG, Strangers with Candy, The Practice, Cold Case and more. He has also had brief recurring roles in the Nickelodeon series The Mystery Files of Shelby Woo and as Ben Sturky on the Disney Channel series That's So Raven.

He appeared in the 2001 film The Believer, alongside Ryan Gosling. He has a small role in The Dark Knight alongside Christian Bale and Heath Ledger playing character Coleman Reese, as well as the Marvel film Iron Man, both released in 2008. He also appeared in the 2010 film Unthinkable. In the same year, Harto along with his wife, Liz W. Garcia, created the TNT police drama Memphis Beat, starring Jason Lee. The series ended the following year after two seasons.

== Filmography ==
=== Film ===
Year	Title	Role	Notes
2000	Swimming	Lance	
2001	The Believer	Kyle	
2001	Ordinary Sinner	Scott	
2001	Campfire Stories	Teddy	
2004	Peoples	Patrick Wilshire	
2008	Iron Man	CAOC Analyst	
2008	The Dark Knight	Coleman Reese	
2010	Unthinkable	Agent Phillips	
2013	The Lifeguard	John	Also producer
2013	Iron Man 3	CAOC Analyst	
2015	Bridge of Spies	Bates	
2016	Gold	Lloyd Stanton	
2017	The Last Word	Focus Group Man 1	
2019	American Sausage Standoff	Hank	
2020	Ma Rainey's Black Bottom	Policeman	
2024	Space Cadet	Captain Elvis Popowski	

=== Television ===
Year	Title	Role	Notes
1996–1997	The Mystery Files of Shelby Woo	Will	6 episodes
1999	Law & Order	Peter Stymons	Episode: "Hate"
2000	Strangers with Candy	Stoner Kid	Episode: "Ask Jerri"
2001	Oz	Carl Jenkins	2 episodes
2001	Law & Order: Special Victims Unit	Cell Technician	Episode: "Manhunt"
2001	Third Watch	Bart	Episode: "Man Enough"
2001	The Practice	Martin Jenks	Episode: "Liar's Poker"
2003	That's So Raven	Ben Sturky	3 episodes
2003	The Guardian	Scott Davenport	2 episodes
2003	Carnivàle	Junior	Episode: "Milfay"
2004	Crossing Jordan	Joshua Goodson	Episode: "Deja Past"
2004	American Dreams	Jason	Episode: "Tidings of Comfort and Joy"
2005	Without a Trace	Doug Reinecker	Episode: "Party Girl"
2005	Cold Case	Bud	Episode: "Revolution"
2005	JAG	Petty Officer Ferro	Episode: "Dream Team"
2005	McBride: The Doctor Is Out...Really Out	Morgue Attendant	Television film
2005	Invasion	Greg Olgalvy	3 episodes
2006	Veronica Mars	Donald Fagin	Episode: "Welcome Wagon"
2007	The Kidnapping	Logan	Television film
2014	Justified	Agent Henkins	Episode: "Wrong Roads"
2018	Deception	Izzy Fornette	Episode: "Black Art"
2018	Get Shorty	Wayne Kinnian	Episode: "And What Have We Learned?"
2019	Blue Bloods	William Sloan	Episode: "Rectify"
2020	Magnum P.I.	Jim Peele	Episode: "Mondays Are for Murder"
2021	The Resident	Mike Jonah Rellie	Episode: "The Thinnest Veil"
2024	Chicago Med	Ted Kachler	Episode: "Bad Habits"
2025	S.W.A.T.	Steven Owens	Episode: "AMBER"
