= Kristen Wilson =

American actress (born 1969)

- Born: September 4, 1969 (age 56); Chelmsford, Massachusetts, U.S.
- Other names: Kristin Wilson
- Occupation: Actress
- Years active: 1992–2011
- Spouses: Michael Marzovilla (m. 1997; div. 1999) Martin Astles (m. 2000)
- Children: 3

Kristen Wilson (born September 4, 1969) is an American former actress, best known as Miranda DuBaer in Twitches and Twitches Too and as Lisa Dolittle in the films Dr. Dolittle, Dr. Dolittle 2, and Dr. Dolittle 3.

== Early life ==
Kristen Wilson was born on September 4, 1969, and raised in Chelmsford, Massachusetts, near Boston. She trained as a dancer there and worked with the Boston Ballet for four years. She received her Bachelor of Fine Arts degree in musical theatre from Syracuse University, but took some time off during her junior year to be in a national tour of West Side Story.

== Career ==
Kristen made her film debut in the 1992 film Prototype and later landed a supporting role in Who's the Man? In 1995, Kristen moved to New York City, where she starred in the HBO TV movie Tyson as actress Robin Givens. Subsequently, she appeared alongside Damon Wayans and Adam Sandler in Bulletproof. Her other film credits include Get on the Bus, Walking Tall, Crossover, Dungeons and Dragons, Pompatus of Love, Girl 6, Cross-Eyed, Dr. Dolittle, Dr. Dolittle 2, and Dr. Dolittle 3. She also plays the biological mother of Camryn (Tamera Mowry) and Alex (Tia Mowry) in the Disney films Twitches and Twitches Too.

Wilson also has an extensive television career; she is well known for her recurring role on The District. Her other credits include My Wife and Kids, Crossing Jordan, New York Undercover, Matt Waters, and a pilot episode for the CBS' legal drama series Shark.

Wilson's work in theater consists of the Broadway hit Nick & Nora, 1492, The Hunchback, A FunnyForum, A My Name is Alice, The Club, and the national tour of West Side Story.

== Personal life ==
Kristen was married to lighting technician Michael Marzovilla from 1997 to 1999. They have a daughter Ruby, who was born in 1998.

== Filmography ==
=== Film ===
Year	Title	Role	Notes
1992	Prototype	Bar Girl	
1993	Who's the Man?	Maria	
1994	Dead Funny	Fate 1	
1996	Girl 6	Salesgirl #1	
1996	The Pompatus of Love	Tasha	
1996	Bulletproof	Traci Flynn	
1996	Get on the Bus	Shelly	
1998	Dr. Dolittle	Lisa Dolittle	
1999	Cross-Eyed	Laura	
1999	Harlem Aria	Julia	
2000	The Photographer	Schuyler	
2000	Dungeons & Dragons	Norda	
2001	Dr. Dolittle 2	Lisa Dolittle	
2002	Tales from the Crypt Presents: Ritual	Caro Lamb	
2002	Confessions of a Dangerous Mind	Loretta	
2004	Walking Tall	Michelle Vaughn	
2005	Shackles	Helen	
2006	Dr. Dolittle 3	Lisa Dolittle	Direct-to-video
2006	Crossover	Nikki	
2008	Soccer Mom	Dee Dee	

=== Television films ===
Year	Title	Role	Notes
1995	Tyson	Robin Givens	
1996	Educating Matt Waters	Nicole Moore	
2005	Twitches	Miranda Martine-DuBaer	
2007	Twitches Too	Miranda Martine-DuBaer	
2011	Mega Python vs. Gatoroid	Barbara	

=== Television ===
Year	Title	Role	Notes
1992–95	Stand-Up, Stand-Up	Hostess	Unknown episodes
1994	New York Undercover	Eileen Pleshette	Episode: "Eyewitness Blues"
1996	Matt Waters	Nicole Moore	6 episodes
1998	New York Undercover	Shelly Foster	Episode: "Going Native"
2001–02	Crossing Jordan	Kim Watkins	3 episodes
2002	My Wife and Kids	Dr. Cooper Madison	Episode: "Quality Time"
2002–03	The District	Kendall Truman	9 episodes
2006	Shark	Billie Willis	Episode: "Pilot"
