= Twitches (film) =

2005 television film by Stuart Gillard

- Promotional poster
- Based on: Twitches by H. B. Gilmour and Randi Reisfeld
- Teleplay by: Melissa Gould; Dan Berendsen
- Directed by: Stuart Gillard
- Starring: Tia Mowry; Tamera Mowry
- Music by: John Van Tongeren

Production
- Producer: Kevin Lafferty
- Cinematography: Manfred Guthe
- Editor: Robin Russell
- Running time: 86 minutes
- Production companies: Carla Singer Productions; Broomsticks Productions

Original release
- Network: Disney Channel
- Release: October 14, 2005

Related
- Twitches Too (2007)

Twitches is a 2005 American fantasy comedy-drama television film released as a Disney Channel Original Movie and based on the Twitches novel series by H. B. Gilmour and Randi Reisfeld. Directed by Stuart Gillard, the film stars Tia Mowry and Tamera Mowry as Alexandra Fielding and Camryn Barnes, respectively. A sequel, Twitches Too, premiered on October 12, 2007, as a part of Disney Channel's Hauntober Fest.

== Plot ==
In the magical dimension of Coventry, the royal witch Miranda gives birth to identical twin daughters on Halloween night. The sisters are named Apolla and Artemis after the Olympian twins, the gods of the Sun and Moon, respectively; in accordance with their namesakes, Apolla wears an amulet in the shape of the Sun and Artemis wears an amulet in the shape of the Moon. Their father Aron DuBaer, a powerful warlock, transfers the entirety of his magical powers to protect them from an evil entity known as the Darkness and is killed in the process. Karsh and Ileana WarBurton, a magical couple and friends of the family, assume the task of protecting the twins and flee to a non-magical dimension known as Earth to give them up for adoption.

Apolla is adopted by a wealthy couple who name her Camryn Elizabeth Barnes, while Artemis is adopted by a single mother and is named Alexandra "Alex" Nicole Fielding. Alex grows up to be a night owl and stays up until the moon sets, writing about the chronicles of magical twin sisters, unaware that her stories are true. She shares a single bedroom with her close friend Lucinda, after her mother dies a few months prior to her 21st birthday. Meanwhile, Camryn is a passionate artist and a lark, who wakes up at sunrise to sketch realistic pictures; unbeknownst to her, the images she creates are of Miranda and her homeland Coventry.

On the twins' 21st birthday, Camryn and her best friend Beth go shopping, while Alex is looking for a job. After Karsh and Ileana manipulate Alex into entering the store where Camryn is trying on clothes, the sisters encounter each other for the first time since their infancy. Although Camryn is overjoyed to discover Alex, the latter flees the store, prompting the former to grasp her hand, causing a burst of energy. As their magic is released, they discover that they share a sisterly bond and attempt to understand each other.

Karsh and Ileana reveal themselves to the twins and inform them about their magical background, after which Alex realizes that her stories about Coventry are true. According to an old prophecy, the sisters are the only ones capable of vanquishing the Darkness and restoring Coventry. As she has the gift of knowledge, Alex refuses to help fulfill the prophecy because her stories end with death. Camryn convinces Alex to stay, assuring her that they are unstoppable together, and the two practice their magical powers as they bond.

In the meantime, Miranda senses that her daughters are alive and informs their uncle Thantos, whom she married after Aron's death. The Darkness arrives at Alex's apartment, but the sisters transport themselves to Coventry, and the experience overwhelms Camryn. Despite her sister's pleas, she decides that she does not want to venture further into their destiny and leaves for her birthday party on Earth. Alex, determined to help Coventry without her sister, reunites with Miranda and meets Thantos, who informs her that if Camryn is alone, she is powerless against the Darkness.

At her party, Camryn discovers that she used to draw a face in the Darkness and learns from it that Thantos is responsible for the Darkness. She escapes to Coventry after Karsh and Ileana sacrifice themselves to help her. As Camryn reveals their uncle's crimes to Miranda and Alex, Thantos arrives and admits to killing his brother Aron in an attempt to acquire wealth and power. Thantos then captures Miranda and goes on a rampage around the castle. The twins combine their magic of light and love to vanquish him and restore Coventry, simultaneously reviving their mother Miranda, Karsh, and Ileana. They then celebrate their birthday on Earth, alongside Camryn's adoptive parents, David and Emily.

== Cast ==
- Tia Mowry as Alexandra "Alex" Nicole Fielding / Artemis DuBaer
- Tamera Mowry as Camryn "Cam" Elizabeth Barnes / Apolla DuBaer
- Kristen Wilson as Miranda DuBaer, the twins' mother and Queen of Coventry
- Patrick Fabian as Thantos DuBaer, the twins' evil uncle and step-father
- Pat Kelly as Karsh, one of the twins' guardians. He watches over Alex.
- Jennifer Robertson as Ileana, one of the twins' guardians. She watches over Camryn.
- Jessica Greco as Lucinda Carmelson, Alex's best friend
- Jackie Rosenbaum as Beth Fish, Camryn's best friend
- Arnold Pinnock as David Barnes, Camryn's adoptive father
- Karen Holness as Emily Barnes, Camryn's adoptive mother
- Jessica Feliz as Nicole Carmelson, Lucinda's younger sister who loves Halloween
- David Ingram as Aron DuBaer, the twins' father

== Production ==
=== Casting ===
Originally, Tia was supposed to play Camryn and Tamera was supposed to play Alex, but the two wanted their roles to be switched. For the first few days of filming, the cast and crew had a hard time telling Tia and Tamera apart. Kristen Wilson, the actress who played Camryn/Apolla and Alex/Artemis's birth-mother, is nine years older than the Mowry Twins. Also, Karen Holness, who plays Camryn's adoptive mother, is only a year older than Tia and Tamera.

=== Filming ===
Production for the film began in June 2005, entirely shot in Toronto, Ontario. Special effects were used in conjunction with green screens to help simulate the magic tricks shown throughout the film—the transitions between Earth and Coventry, the moon and sun put on the same horizon, and, with the aid of a wind machine, the visualization of the Darkness' presence.

== Release ==
=== Broadcast ===
Twitches premiered on Disney Channel on October 14, 2005, to 7 million viewers. In four subsequent airings during its first weekend, the film drew a total of 21.5 million viewers and was the week's most popular cable program.

=== Home media ===
The film was released on DVD in the United States on September 5, 2006, under the title Twitches: Betwitched Edition, including an exclusive alternate ending.

== Sequel ==
A sequel, Twitches Too, premiered on Disney Channel on October 12, 2007, in the United States.

== See also ==
- List of films set around Halloween
- List of films about witchcraft
