= Memphis Beat =

American crime comedy-drama television series

- Genre: Crime drama; Action; Comedy drama
- Created by: Joshua Harto; Liz W. Garcia
- Starring: Jason Lee; Alfre Woodard; Sam Hennings; DJ Qualls; Celia Weston; Leonard Earl Howze; Abraham Benrubi
- Opening theme: "Memphis Beat" by Keb' Mo'
- Country of origin: United States
- Original language: English
- No. of seasons: 2
- No. of episodes: 20

Production
- Executive producers: Joshua Harto; Liz W. Garcia; Clark Johnson; George Clooney; Grant Heslov
- Production locations: New Orleans, Louisiana
- Running time: 43 minutes
- Production companies: Warner Horizon Television; Smokehouse Productions

Original release
- Network: TNT
- Release: June 22, 2010 – August 16, 2011

Memphis Beat is an American crime comedy-drama television series created by Joshua Harto and Liz W. Garcia that aired on TNT from June 22, 2010, to August 16, 2011, with a total of 20 episodes spanning two seasons. It was produced by Smokehouse Productions, in association with Warner Horizon Television.

On October 14, 2011, TNT canceled the series of Memphis Beat after two seasons.

== Overview ==
The show follows Dwight Hendricks (Jason Lee), a police detective assigned to the General Assignment division of the MPD, who loves his mother, the blues, his city, and Elvis Presley and calls himself "the keeper of Memphis". His passionate devotion to his hometown is offset by his relaxed approach to his job, an attitude that frustrates by-the-book Lt. Tanya Rice (Alfre Woodard), his new boss.

== Cast and characters ==
- Jason Lee as Detective Dwight Hendricks
- Alfre Woodard as Lieutenant Tanya Rice
- Sam Hennings as Detective Charles "Whitehead" White
- DJ Qualls as Police Officer Davey Sutton
- Celia Weston as Paula Ann Hendricks
- Leonard Earl Howze as Detective Reginald Greenback
- Abraham Benrubi as Sgt. JC Lightfoot (Season 1)

== Development and production ==
Jason Lee said he was drawn to the show because the concept was original and the protagonist was fun to play. Lee said, "The whole package was unique and once I came to found the character and the material and the scenarios and his relationships and he's such a great guy and is so multi-layered and cares such a great deal for his city and his family and the people that he's protecting." Lee listened to hundreds of Presley songs in preparation for the role, and said his respect for the artist grew as a result. The vocals for Lee's character are sung by Mark Arnell.

The title Delta Blues was originally considered, but it was eventually changed to Memphis Beat. The show was created by married couple Joshua Harto and Liz W. Garcia, with actor George Clooney and his production partner writer/actor/director Grant Heslov serving as executive producers. Harto and Garcia wrote the first two episodes of the series. Liz Garcia said of the show, "Broadcast TV is being influenced by cable in so many ways in terms of reinventing genres and taking chances, and this is part of it. ... The forefront of creativity is on cable TV."

Despite the show's setting, the first season was primarily filmed in Laplace, LA, and New Orleans, LA, with only some key locations and exteriors filmed in Memphis. This has largely been attributed to the better tax incentives by filming in a state other than Tennessee.

On September 16, 2010, TNT announced that Memphis Beat was renewed for a second season, the first episode of which was broadcast June 14, 2011.

On October 17, 2011, TNT decided not to pick up a third season of Memphis Beat.

== Episodes ==
=== Series overview ===
| Season | Episodes | Originally released | |
| Season | Episodes | First released | Last released |
|---|---|---|---|
| 1 | 10 | June 22, 2010 | August 24, 2010 |
| 2 | 10 | June 14, 2011 | August 16, 2011 |

=== Season 1 (2010) ===
| No. overall | No. in season | Title | Directed by | Written by | Original release date | U.S. viewers (millions) |
|---|---|---|---|---|---|---|
| 1 | 1 | "It's Alright Mama" | Clark Johnson | Liz W. Garcia & Joshua Harto | June 22, 2010 | 4.30 |
Detective Dwight Hendricks investigates the abuse of an elderly woman who is also a legendary Memphis disc jockey known as the "First Lady of the Airwaves". But his new boss, Lt. Tanya Rice, starts cramping his investigative style when she brings a den mother approach to her job. Meanwhile, Dwight's mother starts dating her new neighbor.
| 2 | 2 | "Baby, Let's Play House" | Kevin Dowling | Sean Whitesell | June 29, 2010 | 4.00 |
Dwight and Whitehead search for a missing truck driver, when his son tells his classmates he was kidnapped. Meanwhile, Dwight has to try to get used to his mother dating a guy he doesn't trust and his ex-wife, Alex (Sunny Mabrey), keeps sending him mixed signals.
| 3 | 3 | "Love Her Tender" | John Fortenberry | Liz W. Garcia & Joshua Harto | July 6, 2010 | 3.56 |
While the squad tries to find a missing teenage beauty queen, Dwight tries to help Alex get her catering business off the ground.
| 4 | 4 | "Polk Salad Annie" | David Von Ancken | Tom Smuts & Meredith Stiehm | July 13, 2010 | 2.95 |
A BBQ king is almost killed which makes all the members of his inner circle suspects. And to find the killer, Officer Sutton must go undercover as a ladies man. Meanwhile, Lt Rice must deal with her own problems when her son has a run in with the law.
| 5 | 5 | "One Night of Sin" | Alex Zakrzewski | Angelina Burnett | July 20, 2010 | 3.12 |
A lead singer of a country western family and the group's manager dies suddenly. The manager's death is ruled as a suicide but Dwight suspect there might have been foul play when the family's problems come to light and an obsessed fan begins to act stranger than normal.
| 6 | 6 | "Run On" | Randy Zisk | Sean Whitesell | July 27, 2010 | 3.18 |
Dwight tries to find put who would have benefited more from a vicious assault on a local boxer or lost more from his upcoming retirement. Meanwhile, Sutton tries to make up for a lost opportunity from his past.
| 7 | 7 | "Suspicious Minds" | Michelle MacLaren | Scott Kaufer | August 3, 2010 | 3.51 |
A plane safely lands with absolutely nobody onboard, so Hendrick decides to investigate it, which leads to a failed lottery winning inventor who could have had something to do with it.
| 8 | 8 | "I Shall Not Be Moved" | Kevin Bray | Scott Kaufer | August 10, 2010 | 3.81 |
Dwight gets involved in a hostage situation and decides to become a second hostage to aid the situation and while he tries to defuse the situation he uncovers things from the captors past that goes way back to a cold case that has been unsolved for decades. Meanwhile, Lt. Rice find herself in trouble involving her ex-husband.
| 9 | 9 | "Don't Be So Cruel" | John Fortenberry | Joshua Harto, Liz W. Garcia & Angelina Burnett | August 17, 2010 | 3.94 |
Dwight and the rest of the squad search for a missing city councilman who disappeared on his wedding day. While his disappearance threatens to expose the underbelly of Memphis politics.
| 10 | 10 | "I Want to Be Free" | John Fortenberry | Liz W. Garcia & Joshua Harto | August 24, 2010 | 3.86 |
Dwight is haunted by an unsolved murder from 2007 while dealing with an amnesiac shooting victim in 2010. Meanwhile, Lt. Rice decides it might be time to change her career. Abe Benrubi makes his final appearance as Sgt. Lightfoot plus Memphis Mafia member Jerry Schilling makes a cameo appearance.

=== Season 2 (2011) ===
| No. overall | No. in season | Title | Directed by | Written by | Original release date | U.S. viewers (millions) |
|---|---|---|---|---|---|---|
| 11 | 1 | "At the River" | Michael Katleman | Jan Nash | June 14, 2011 | 3.02 |
Dwight teams up with an Internal Affairs detective (Beau Garrett) to investigate the murder of a police officer who may have had a connection to a gun smuggling ring.
| 12 | 2 | "Inside Man" | Elodie Keene | Bill Chais | June 21, 2011 | 2.89 |
Dwight and Whitehead attempt to catch some infamous burglars who attempt to beat the system by claiming statute of limitations on their previous crimes. They receive reluctant help from a pesky insurance agent (Thomas Lennon) with extensive knowledge of the initial robberies.
| 13 | 3 | "Lost" | Aaron Lipstadt | Jim Adler | June 28, 2011 | 2.88 |
Dwight agrees to a father's plea for help in finding his missing daughter.
| 14 | 4 | "Flesh and Blood" | Mike Listo | Liz W. Garcia & Joshua Harto | July 5, 2011 | 3.33 |
Dwight and Whitehead investigate a Missing Persons case involving a nun; Sutton finds an abandoned baby in his car that turns out to have a connection to the case.
| 15 | 5 | "Things We Carry" | Randy Zisk | Blair Singer | July 12, 2011 | 2.94 |
Dwight and Paula-Ann travel to New Orleans to speak at the early-release hearing for Dwight's father's killer (who is dying of cancer). Meanwhile, Whitehead and Lt. Rice investigate the burning of a beloved and historic Memphis movie theater.
| 16 | 6 | "Troubled Waters" | Greg Beeman | Matt Payne | July 19, 2011 | 2.87 |
Dwight re-encounters three old friends: one is arrested in a houseboat robbery case, another is an old flame, and the third is a band member from his high school days, with whom he performs.
| 17 | 7 | "Body of Evidence" | John Showalter | Jonathan I. Kidd and Sonya Winton | July 26, 2011 | 3.25 |
Dwight and Whitehead investigate when the body of a man known for helping at risk children goes missing during his funeral, and discover that the man might not have been the saint he seemed to be.
| 18 | 8 | "Identity Crisis" | Aaron Lipstadt | Jim Adler | August 2, 2011 | 3.22 |
Dwight looks into the claims of a man who attacked his bank's employees, when the man accuses the bank of stealing his identity and draining his account. The investigation leads to a large web of identity theft and fraud committed by a small team of con-artists.
| 19 | 9 | "Ten Little Memphians" | Anton Cropper | Bill Chais & Blair Singer | August 9, 2011 | 3.02 |
Dwight and Whitehead's visit to the latter's childhood home for a will reading is hampered by a thunderstorm and the murder of the will's executor.
| 20 | 10 | "The Feud" | Michael Katleman | Jan Nash | August 16, 2011 | 4.05 |
The shooting of a girl in the business district of Memphis uncovers a long-standing feud between two powerful families, which the squad tries to quell while working the case before anyone else gets hurt.

== Reception ==
=== Critical reception ===
On Metacritic season 1 has a score of 56% based on 18 reviews, indicating "mixed or average reviews". On Rotten Tomatoes season 1 has an approval rating of 38% based on reviews from 24 critics. The New York Times said of the pilot episode "This series is to Memphis what the HBO series 'Treme' is to New Orleans and 'Justified' on FX is to Harlan County in Kentucky—timeless indigenous music is set against the exoticism of temporal subcultures". The New York Daily News gave another positive review saying that "TNT's new 'Memphis Beat' has a great soundtrack and a pretty good cop drama in between". The Hollywood Reporter also gave the pilot a positive review:

But even as the cop genre seems beyond saturation, along comes TNT's Memphis Beat, a series with a fresh character in a fresh environment with a fresh look and sound that proves, against all odds, that good actors and agile execution trump format every time.

=== Awards and nominations ===
Awards and nominations for Memphis Beat
| Year | Award | Category | Actor | Result |
|---|---|---|---|---|
| 2011 | NAACP Image Award | Outstanding Supporting Actress in a Drama Series | Alfre Woodard | Nominated |
| 2011 | NAMIC Vision Awards | Best Performance - Drama | Alfre Woodard | Nominated |
| 2011 | Gracie Allen Awards | Outstanding Supporting Actress - Drama Series | Alfre Woodard | Won |

== International broadcasting ==
| Country | Network | Series Premiere |
|---|---|---|
| United Kingdom | 13th Street Universal | August 1, 2010 |
| Canada | Super Channel | September 9, 2010 |
| Turkey | CNBC-e | September 23, 2010 |
| Portugal | AXN | November 25, 2010 (AXN) |
| Norway | Viasat 4 | April 11, 2011 |
| South Africa | Mnet Series | April 27, 2011 |
| Spain | AXN | June 23, 2011 |
| Poland | TV Puls | September 5, 2011 |
| Latvia | LTV 7 | September 30, 2011 |
| Israel | HOT3 | 2011 |
| Finland | MTV3 | October 6, 2011 |
| Australia | Nine Network | December 29, 2011 |
| South Korea | OCN Series | 2010 |
| Italy | Premium Crime | March 1, 2012 |
| Germany | TNT Serie | May 7, 2012 |
| Sweden | TNT (Sweden) | April 5, 2013 |
| Brazil | SBT | August 7, 2013 |
| Estonia | Kanal 2 | May 22, 2014 |
