= Nathaniel Marston =

American actor (1975–2015)

- Marston on Soap Talk
- Born: July 9, 1975; Torrington, Connecticut, U.S.
- Died: November 11, 2015 (aged 40); Reno, Nevada, U.S.
- Occupations: Actor, producer
- Years active: 1996–2011
- Spouse: Rita Bias (m. 2006–2015)

Nathaniel Marston (July 9, 1975 – November 11, 2015) was an American actor and producer, known for his daytime roles on the CBS soap opera As the World Turns and ABC's One Life to Live.

== Early life ==
Born on July 9, 1975, in Torrington, Connecticut, Marston lived in several states with his mother Elizabeth, an aspiring actress, before moving to Kauaʻi, Hawaii, at the age of three. When he was ten, they moved to San Diego, California. During the next several years he lived in Los Angeles and New York, returning to Los Angeles where he graduated from Beverly Hills High School.

== Career ==
While working at a Beverly Hills bakery, Marston was "discovered" by a customer who happened to be an agent for William Morris. After appearing in several commercials, he was cast as Rosario Cappamezza in the feature film Love Is All There Is co-starring with Angelina Jolie, followed by a role in the film The Craft (1996). He then became a regular in the prime time television series Matt Waters in 1996.

Marston appeared as Eddie Silva on the CBS soap opera As the World Turns from 1998 to 2000. The role earned him a Soap Opera Digest Award nomination for "Outstanding Male Newcomer."

He next portrayed Al Holden on the ABC soap opera One Life to Live from 2001 to 2003, and then subsequently played Dr. Michael McBain on the series from 2004 to 2007.

Marston had a small role in the 2002 cable television movie Monday Night Mayhem. On November 25, 2008, he appeared on Law & Order: SVU in the role of Brent Latimer. Marston's other film work includes roles in the feature films Ordinary Sinner (2001) and Ciao, America (2002), along with a leading role in the short film The Paw (2005). Marston also starred as Tony Parisi in the 2011 independently produced body-switching romantic comedy Walk a Mile in My Pradas.

== Personal life ==
Marston was married to Rita Bias in 2006. In the early hours of October 21, 2007, he was arrested following an altercation with three people in New York City. Initially it was thought that he was under the influence of narcotics. Ultimately, in March 2010 Marston pleaded guilty to one charge of misdemeanor resisting arrest and completed a three-month course in anger management as part of a no-jail-time sentencing deal. No drug allegations were ever substantiated, though Marston did admit to punching a police officer who was trying to break up the fracas. Marston was involved with the charities The Gabriel Project and Lower Eastside Service Center. He was an amateur boxer.

=== Death ===
On October 30, 2015, Marston was involved in a car accident near Reno, Nevada, that left him in critical condition. He was not wearing a seatbelt when his pickup truck flipped several times, throwing him from the truck. No drugs or alcohol were found in his system. His mother later reported that he was on life support and doctors had advised that, if he survived, he would likely be paralyzed from the neck down. Marston died on November 11, 2015, following complications from surgery.

== Filmography ==
=== Film ===
Year	Title	Character	Notes	ref
1996	Love Is All There Is	Rosario Capomezzo		
1996	The Craft	Trey		
2001	Ordinary Sinner	Robert		
2002	Ciao, America	Skip Cromwell		
2005	The Paw	Clint Powers		
2011	Walk a Mile in My Pradas	Tony		

=== Television ===
Year	Title	Character	Notes	ref
1996	Matt Waters	Jack Tisdale	Short-lived American drama television show that starred talk show host Montel Williams, and was created by James D. Parriott.	
1998–2000	As the World Turns	Eddie Silva	Contract role	
2001–07	One Life to Live	Al Holden	Contract role	
2001–07	One Life to Live	Michael McBain	Contract role	
2002	Monday Night Mayhem	Reporter in Bar	Television film about the origin of ABC's television series Monday Night Football.	
2003	Soap Talk	Himself	Episode: "Episode 39.02" (S 2:Ep 39)	
2004	The View	Himself	Episode: "Swank/Marston" (S 7:Ep 113)	
2004	Soap Talk	Himself	Episode: "Episode 55.03" (S 3:Ep 55)	
2008	Law & Order: Special Victims Unit	Brent Latimer	Episode: "Persona" (S 10:Ep 8)	
2010	White Collar	Thomas Loze/Edward Reilly	Episode: "Front Man" (S 1:Ep 13)	
2010	Castle	Grant Vyro	Episode: "Last Call" (S 3:Ep 10)	
2011	Blue Bloods	Ronnie Cleary	Episode: "Cellar Boy" (S 1:Ep 21)	
