= Ordinary Sinner =

- Directed by: John Henry Davis
- Written by: William Mahone
- Story by: William Mahone; John Henry Davis; J.B. White
- Produced by: Chris Bongirne; John Henry Davis; J.B. White
- Starring: A Martinez; Elizabeth Banks; Kris Park; Joshua Harto
- Cinematography: Mathieu Roberts
- Edited by: Paul Zehrer
- Music by: Brian Adler
- Release date: 2001
- Running time: 92 minutes
- Country: United States
- Language: English

Ordinary Sinner is a 2001 American romantic drama film directed by John Henry Davis and starring A Martinez, Elizabeth Banks, Kris Park and Joshua Harto.

== Cast ==
- Brendan Hines
- Joshua Harto
- Kris Park
- Elizabeth Banks
- A Martinez
- Peter Onorati
- Chris Messina
- Daniel Sherman
- Nathaniel Marston
- Kia Joy Goodwin
- Jesse Tyler Ferguson

== Reception ==
The film has a 17% rating on Rotten Tomatoes.
