= Yasha Jackson =

American actress

- Occupation: Actress
- Years active: 2007–present

Yasha Jackson is an American actress. Jackson is best known for her recurring roles on Ray Donovan (2018), Blue Bloods (2018–2019), The Bold Type (2020–2021) and The Flight Attendant (2020–2022).

== Filmography ==
=== Film ===
Year	Title	Role	Notes
2013	10 Cards	Christine	Short
2013	Gouge	Michelle	Short
2015	Teaming Up	Jessica	Short
2016	Little Boxes	Denise	
2018	A Diva Duet: In F Minor	Elliott Rosen	Short
2021	Either Side of Midnight	Tina	
2021	Killer Among Us	Alisha	
2021	Clifford the Big Red Dog	Officer Zapatero	
2021	The Hating Game	Julie	
2024	Space Cadet	Grace Jackson	

=== Television ===
Year	Title	Role	Notes
2007	Law & Order: Special Victims Unit	Courtney Williams	Episode: "Snitch"
2014	Nurse Jackie	Admitting Nurse	Episode: "Rat on a Cheeto"
2014	Hot Mess	Nicole	Episode: "Men from Last Night"
2014	The Mysteries of Laura	Lisa	Episode: "Pilot"
2014	Forever	Antoinette	Episode: "The Pugilist Break"
2015	One Bad Choice	Kimberly	Episode: "Michelle Gopaul"
2017	The Get Down	Shawna Everly-Jones	Episode: "Only from Exile Can We Come Home"
2017	Black Mirror	Emily	Episode: "Black Museum"
2018	Ray Donovan	K'Lei Hughes	Recurring Cast: Season 6
2018–19	Blue Bloods	Maya Thomas	Recurring Cast: Season 9
2019	Pinkalicious & Peterrific	Ms. Cooper (voice)	Episode: "Whale of a Song; Pinkabubbles"
2020	Manifest	Suzanne Martin	Recurring Cast: Season 2
2020–21	The Bold Type	Dr. Alicia Golden	Recurring Cast: Season 4, Guest: Season 5
2020–22	The Flight Attendant	Jada Harris	Recurring Cast
2021	Bull	Vanessa Voss	Episode: "Bull Undone"
2021	Love Life	Destiny Mathis	Episode: "Destiny Mathis"
2022	ElfQuest: Journey to Sorrow's End	Shen-Shen/Maleen (voice)	Recurring Cast
2022	Helpsters	Smoothie Samantha	Episode: "Smoothie Samantha/Taxi Tina"
2021–23	Run the World	Iman	Guest Cast: Season 1–2
2024	The Equalizer	Jamila Cayman	Episode: "Legendary"

=== Video game ===
Year	Title	Role
2013	Grand Theft Auto V	Tanisha Jackson (voice)
