= Matt Waters =

American television series

- Created by: James D. Parriott; Steven Phillip Smith
- Starring: Montel B. Williams; Kristen Wilson; Richard Chevolleau; Cyndi Cartagena; Felix A. Pire; Nathaniel Marston; Amy Hargreaves; Sam McMurray
- Composer: Kurt Farquhar
- Country of origin: United States
- Original language: English
- No. of seasons: 1
- No. of episodes: 6

Production
- Executive producer: James D. Parriott
- Running time: 60 minutes
- Production companies: Christmas Tree Entertainment; James D. Parriott Productions; TriStar Television

Original release
- Network: CBS
- Release: January 3 – February 7, 1996

Matt Waters is an American drama series which aired in 1996 on CBS. The program starred talk show host Montel Williams, and was created by James D. Parriott. The show, which was a midseason replacement, failed to garner a significant audience and was canceled after just six episodes.

Williams played a retired naval officer who becomes a high school science teacher at Bayview High School, the school he had attended 25 years earlier. Williams's character had returned home after his brother was killed in a gang related murder. Portions of the program were filmed at Bayonne High School in Bayonne, New Jersey.

== Cast ==
- Montel B. Williams as Matt Waters
- Kristen Wilson as Nicole Moore
- Richard Chevolleau as Flea Decker
- Cyndi Cartagena as Angela Perez
- Felix A. Pire as Russ Achoa
- Nathaniel Marston as Jack Tisdale
- Amy Hargreaves as Chloe Drescher
- Sam McMurray as Charlie Sweet

== Episodes ==
No.	Title	Directed by	Written by	Original release date
1	"Coming Home"	Rick Wallace	James D. Parriott	January 3, 1996
2	"Baby Love"	Unknown	Unknown	January 10, 1996
3	"Just Another Day"	Unknown	Unknown	January 17, 1996
4	"Pay Day"	Unknown	Unknown	January 24, 1996
5	"Standard Time"	Unknown	Unknown	January 31, 1996
6	"Who"	Unknown	Unknown	February 7, 1996
