= Heavy Petting (2007 film) =

- DVD cover
- Directed by: Marcel Sarmiento
- Written by: Marcel Sarmiento
- Produced by: Marcel Sarmiento; Peter Glatzer; Vince P. Maggio; Gill Holland; Lillian LaSalle
- Starring: Malin Åkerman; Brendan Hines; Kevin Sussman
- Cinematography: Tim Ives; Zeus Morand
- Edited by: David Cordon; Phyllis Housen
- Music by: Julian Nott
- Production companies: SarcoFilms; LaSalleHolland
- Distributed by: Anchor Bay Entertainment
- Release dates: October 20, 2007 (Hollywood Film Festival); July 15, 2008 (United States; DVD)
- Running time: 92 minutes
- Country: United States
- Language: English

Heavy Petting is a 2007 American romantic comedy film written and directed by Marcel Sarmiento. The film follows a young man as he falls in love with a girl, but has to battle with her dog for her affections, only to discover that he himself is falling in love with the dog.

== Cast ==
- Malin Åkerman as Daphne
- Brendan Hines as Charlie
- Mike Doyle as James
- Kevin Sussman as Ras
- Juan Hernandez as Juan
- Marcel Sarmiento as Louis
- Sam Coppola as old codger #1
- Allie Woods as old codger #2
- Krysten Ritter as innocent bystander
- Casper the dog as Babydoll
