= Dr. Dolittle 3 =

2006 film by Rich Thorne

- Official DVD cover
- Directed by: Rich Thorne
- Written by: Nina Colman
- Based on: Doctor Dolittle by Hugh Lofting
- Produced by: John Davis
- Starring: Kyla Pratt; Kristen Wilson; John Amos
- Cinematography: Eric J. Goldstein
- Edited by: Tony Lombardo
- Music by: Christopher Lennertz
- Production company: Davis Entertainment
- Distributed by: 20th Century Fox Home Entertainment
- Release date: April 25, 2006
- Running time: 94 minutes
- Country: United States
- Language: English

Dr. Dolittle 3 is a 2006 American direct-to-video fantasy comedy film and the third film in the Dr. Dolittle series. It stars Kyla Pratt, reprising her role from the previous installments, as Maya Dolittle. Returning alongside Pratt are Kristen Wilson as Lisa Dolittle and Norm Macdonald as the voice of Lucky the Dog.

This is the first film not to feature Eddie Murphy as Dr. John Dolittle nor Raven-Symoné as Charisse Dolittle, although they are mentioned in the film. 17 years later, it was revealed in a 2023 interview that the reason they did not return was because Murphy was too uncomfortable playing the father of a grown adult daughter.

== Plot ==
Maya Dolittle has evolved considerably from an anti-social individual who was more interested in her science projects into a typical teenager. Like her sister Charisse, she inherits their father John's capacity for communicating with animals (she is a part-time veterinary assistant) and her life has changed drastically on all fronts. She often ends up in trouble with her parents, while her friends think she has gone insane.

With John away on business, Maya's mother Lisa sends her and her dog Lucky to Durango dude ranch so she can find herself. The ranch is owned by Jud Jones, and his son Bo. While at the ranch, Maya, who desperately tried to keep her talent under wraps so as not to arouse suspicion, uses it to "talk to the animals" in order to save Durango from being taken over by a neighboring dude ranch.

Maya is at first reluctant to show her ability to others, fearing rejection from her friends, but eventually does so. With her help, the Durango ranch enters a rodeo competition with a $50,000 award, and wins it. Also, she shares her first kiss with Bo and finally wins his heart.

== Cast ==
- Kyla Pratt as Maya Dolittle
- Kristen Wilson as Lisa Dolittle
- Walker Howard as Bo Jones
- John Amos as Jud Jones
- Luciana Carro as Brooklyn Webster
- Tommy Snider as Clayton Taylor
- Calum Worthy as Tyler
- John Novak as Walter
- Chelan Simmons as Vivica
- Ecstasia Sanders as Tammy
- James Kirk as Peter
- Gary Jones as Principal
- Carly McKillip as Tammy's Friend
- Emily Tennant as Party Kid
- Alistair Abell as Honkey Tonk Announcer
- Peter Kelamis as Rodeo Announcer
- Louis Chirillo as Bus Driver

=== Voice cast ===
- Norm Macdonald as Lucky
- Danny Bonaduce as Ranch Steer
- Gary Busey as Butch, a Morgan Horse.
- Ryan McDonell as Skip
- Tara Wilson as Kiki
- Chenier Hundal as Chip
- Paulo Costanzo as Cogburn the Rooster
- Chris Edgerly as Diamond the Horse, LP the Horse, Pig, Rattlesnake
- Eli Gabay as Rodeo Bull, Rodeo Steer
- Vanessa Marshall as Tan Hen, White Hen
- Mark Moseley as Harry the Hawk, Patches the Horse, Ranch Steer, Rodeo Longhorns, Silver the Horse
- Jenna von Oÿ as Gracie, a Border Collie.

== Production ==
The film was shot in British Columbia, Canada.

== Release ==
This film was released direct-to-video in 2006; on April 25 for Region 1 and May 1 for Region 2.

== Reception ==
=== Critical response ===
Of the three reviews at Rotten Tomatoes, two are negative. Scott Weinberg of DVD Talk gave the film 1.5 out of 5, writing, "Cheap-looking, atrociously written, and delivered with all the energy of a breach-birth bovine, Dr. Dolittle 3 is all kinds of terrible". Emily Ashby of Common Sense Media was positive to the film. She gave the film 4 out of 5, writing, "Positive messages throughout tween-friendly animal comedy".
