= Deep in the Valley =

2009 film by Christian Forte

Deep In The Valley
- DVD cover
- Directed by: Christian Forte
- Written by: Christian Forte
- Produced by: Bryan Brucks; Judd Payne; Geoff Pence; Matthew Rhodes
- Starring: Chris Pratt; Brendan Hines
- Cinematography: Alex Vendler
- Edited by: Sandy S. Solowitz
- Music by: William Goodrum
- Production company: Persistent Entertainment
- Release dates: July 22, 2009 (France); October 10, 2009 (United States)
- Running time: 96 minutes
- Country: United States

Deep in the Valley (also known as American Hot Babes in the UK) is a 2009 romantic comedy film written and directed by Christian Forte, son of 1950s and 1960s teen icon Fabian.

== Plot ==
Lester Watts (Chris Pratt) works at a liquor store, happily selling alcohol to minors while spending his spare money on his pornography collection. His best friend since third grade, Carl (Brendan Hines) works a corporate job at his British fiancée's family's company. He wants to leave the job and work somewhere else, but she angrily tells him he has no choice and that he must stay; it is clear that she is completely in control of the relationship.

That night, the two friends have a beer when a delivery comes in the form of a vintage porn viewer machine which plays the films of Diamond Jim (Christopher McDonald). They step inside and it transports them to a land where everyone acts like they are in a pornographic film. The police arrest them, led by Rod Cannon (Scott Caan), but they escape and are hidden from the police by Bambi Cummings (Rachel Specter) at her sorority house, Tri-Pi.

They elude the police while Bambi and Carl fall in love with each other. Eventually, they go to Diamond Jim's pool party where Carl decides to get transported home and Lester decides to stay. It is revealed that Lester is Diamond Jim's son. Back home, Carl breaks up with his overbearing girlfriend and Bambi is transported to him, reuniting them. Meanwhile, Lester takes over his father's porno empire. After the closing credits, it is revealed that Rod was transported to Lester's old job at the liquor store.

== Cast ==
- Chris Pratt as Lester Watts
- Brendan Hines as Carl
- Scott Caan as Rod Cannon
- Rachel Specter as Bambi Cummings
- Kim Kardashian as Summa Eve
- Denise Richards as Autumn Bliss
- Christopher McDonald as Jim "Diamond Jim"
- Blanca Soto as Suzi "Diablo"
- Tracy Morgan as "Busta Nut"
- Charlotte Salt as Tracy
- Olivia O'Lovely as Busta Nut Cocktail waitress

== Soundtrack ==
- Somebody Do It - Written and Performed by Darius Holbert
- The Slide - Written and Performed by Jake Keller (as Jacob Keller)
- On The Bus - Written and Performed by Jake Keller (as Jacob Keller)
- Push, Push (Lady Lightning) - Written and Performed by Bang Camaro.
