= Brendan Hines =

American actor (born 1976)

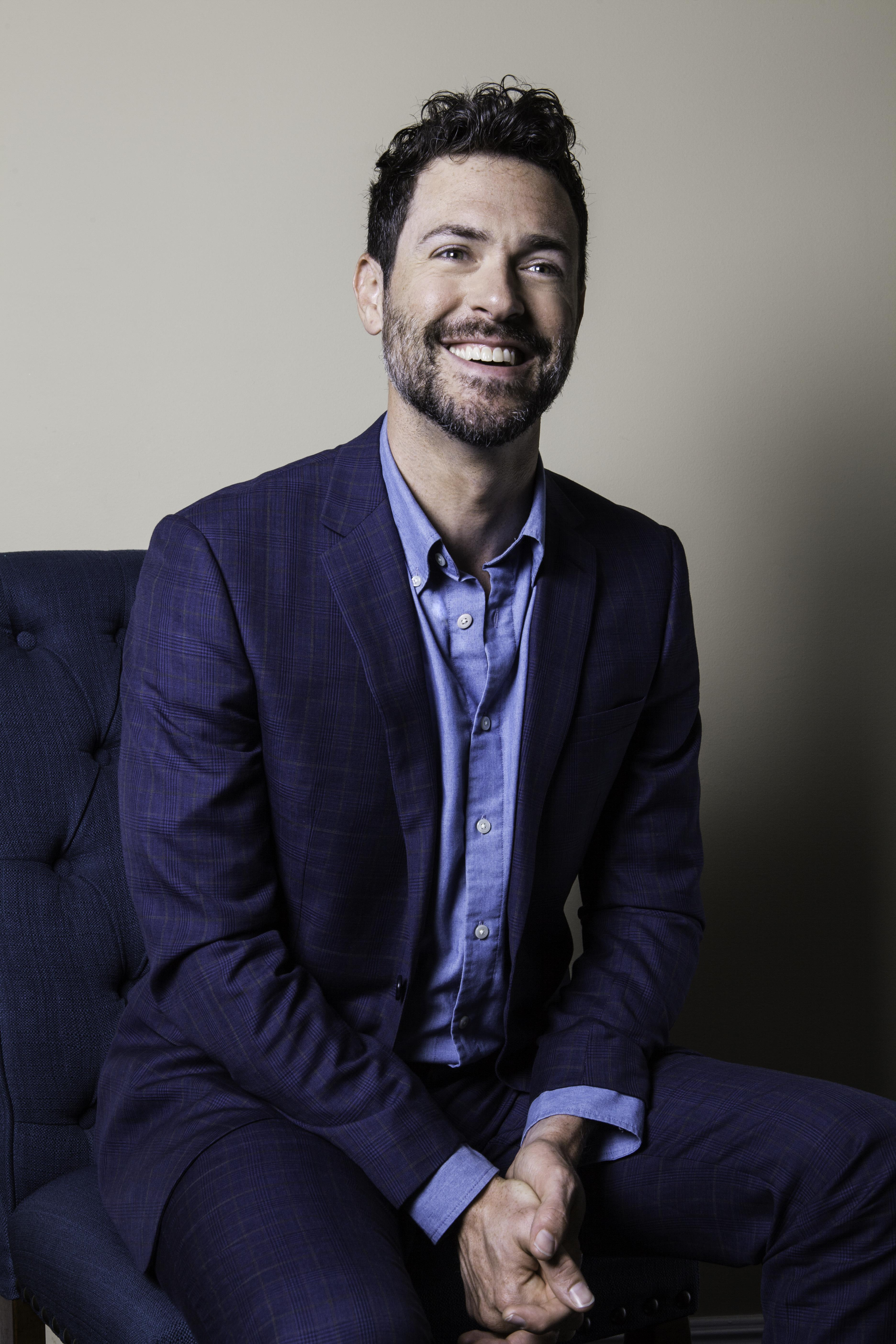
- Hines in 2017
- Born: Brendan Patrick Hines; December 28, 1976 (age 49); Baltimore, Maryland, U.S.
- Occupations: Actor, singer
- Years active: 1998–present
- Spouse: Tatiana Maslany (m. 2022)
- Relatives: Daniel Maslany (brother-in-law)
- Website: brendanhinesmusic.com

Brendan Patrick Hines (born December 28, 1976) is an American actor. He has had a number of television roles, including as part of the main cast of Lie to Me as well as recurring roles in Scandal, Betrayal, Suits, Scorpion, Secrets and Lies, and a regular role in Amazon Video's The Tick and Netflix's Locke & Key. Hines has also had leading roles in a handful of films, and released three albums.

== Early life ==
Hines was born the youngest of four children on December 28, 1976, in Baltimore, Maryland, where he graduated from Loyola Blakefield. His mother, Mary Hines, was a former nun and his father a former Jesuit priest who both appealed to dissolve their religious vows so they could marry. They left Brooklyn and eventually settled in Baltimore to teach philosophy. His mother was president of Carlow University in Pittsburgh.

== Career ==
Hines' acting career began on-stage where he performed in several plays in New York City. His first major film role was in the 2001 independent film Ordinary Sinner. In 2004 and 2005, he appeared in one episode each of both Angel and Love, Inc., respectively. In 2007, Hines starred in Heavy Petting opposite Malin Åkerman. One of his first major television roles was portraying Andy Goode in several episodes of the Terminator television series, Terminator: The Sarah Connor Chronicles. Hines went on to play a recurring role in The Middleman. He then returned to film in Deep in the Valley (2009) co-starring Chris Pratt.

In 2009, Hines began appearing as part of the regular cast of Lie to Me. Hines was part of all three seasons of the series playing the character of Eli Loker. In 2011, he appeared in an episode of Castle. In May 2011, Hines portrayed the dual characters of Pip/Theo in South Coast Repertory's theatre production of Three Days of Rain. Hines has stated this was perhaps his favorite and most challenging acting role.

In 2012, he appeared in an episode of Body of Proof and also began appearing in a recurring role in first season of Scandal. In 2013, he gained a recurring role in Betrayal. In 2014, he played Logan Sanders in the fourth season of Suits. He has also appeared in several episodes of Scorpion and the second season of Secrets and Lies.

In August 2017, Amazon Video released the first season of The Tick, a television series based on the comic book of the same name written by Ben Edlund. Hines portrays Superian, perhaps the most recognizable archetypal superhero among the many comic book characters in the series.

=== Music career and political activism ===
In early 2008, he released Good For You Know Who, an album of 10 original songs under the band name The Brendan Hines. The song "Miss New York" from the same album was featured in the 2010 film Happythankyoumoreplease, the directorial debut of Josh Radnor. In August 2012, he released "Could've Sworn", a single from his 6-song EP entitled Small Mistakes. In support of the release of Small Mistakes, Hines toured with the indie folk duo The Milk Carton Kids in the fall of 2012.

Hines is a vocal supporter of Bernie Sanders. In the lead up to the 2016 Democratic Primaries, he joined the Vermont Senator at several events to campaign for Sanders' bid to become the democratic candidate for President of the United States. In September 2017, Hines released "Average Is", the debut single from his upcoming solo album Qualms, a collection of songs written and recorded in the Joshua Tree Desert after the 2016 presidential election.

== Personal life ==
Hines married actress Tatiana Maslany in 2022.

== Filmography ==
=== Film ===
| Year | Title | Role | Notes |
|---|---|---|---|
| 2001 | Ordinary Sinner | Peter | Credited as Brendan P. Hines |
| 2002 | True Dreams | Sketchy Dan | |
| 2007 | Heavy Petting | Charlie | |
| 2009 | Deep in the Valley | Carl | |
| 2015 | No Way Jose | Dr. Steve | |
| 2019 | Josie & Jack | Ben Sorrels | |
| 2021 | Shelter In Place | John Burke | |
| TBA | The Young People † | TBA | Post-production |

=== Television ===
| Years | Title | Role | Notes |
|---|---|---|---|
| 2004 | Angel | Eli | Episode: "Harm's Way" |
| 2005 | Love, Inc. | Dr. West | Episode: "Family Ties" |
| 2006 | If You Lived Here, You'd Be Home Now | Scott | TV movie |
| 2006 | Without a Trace | Jason Barnes | Episode: "Watch Over Me" |
| 2008 | Terminator: The Sarah Connor Chronicles | Andy Goode | 3 episodes: "The Turk", "Queen's Gambit", "Dungeons & Dragons" |
| 2008 | The Middleman | Tyler Ford | 5 episodes |
| 2009–2011 | Lie to Me | Eli Loker | Main cast; 48 episodes |
| 2011 | Castle | Alex Conrad | Episode: "The Dead Pool" |
| 2012 | Body of Proof | Marc Freston | Episode: "Falling for You" |
| 2012 | Scandal | Gideon Wallace | Recurring cast (season 1); 6 episodes |
| 2012 | Covert Affairs | Wade Moore | Episode: "The Last Thing You Should Do" |
| 2012 | The Mob Doctor | Father Doyle | Episode: "Confessions" |
| 2013 | Murder in Manhattan | Bart Sutton | TV movie |
| 2013 | Beauty & the Beast | David | Episode: "On Thin Ice" |
| 2013 | Betrayal | Aidan | Recurring cast; 5 episodes |
| 2014 | Suits | Logan Sanders | 7 episodes |
| 2014–2015 | Scorpion | Drew Baker | 7 episodes |
| 2016 | Secrets and Lies | Detective Ralston | 7 episodes |
| 2016–2019 | The Tick | Superian | 17 episodes |
| 2018–2019 | MacGyver | Ethan Raines | Recurring role (season 3) |
| 2019 | Our Christmas Love Song | Chase | Hallmark TV movie |
| 2021–2022 | Locke & Key | Josh Bennett | Main cast (seasons 2–3); 16 episodes |
| 2024 | Brilliant Minds | Simon | 2 episodes: "The Girl Who Cried Pregnant", "The Man from Grozny" |
| 2025 | Chicago Med | Nicholas Hayes | Recurring role (season 10) |
