= The Lifeguard =

2013 film by Liz W. Garcia

- movie poster
- Directed by: Liz W. Garcia
- Written by: Liz W. Garcia
- Produced by: Liz W. Garcia; Milan Chakraborty; Joshua Harto; Mike Landry; Ed McWilliams; Carlos Velazquez
- Starring: Kristen Bell; David Lambert
- Cinematography: John Peters
- Edited by: Jennifer Davidoff Cook; Elizabeth Kling
- Music by: Fred Avril
- Production companies: Attic Light Films; C Plus Pictures; Houndstooth; La Pistola; Productivity Media; Wild Invention
- Distributed by: Focus World; Screen Media Films
- Release dates: January 19, 2013 (Sundance); July 30, 2013 (VOD); August 30, 2013 (United States)
- Running time: 98 minutes
- Country: United States
- Language: English

The Lifeguard is a 2013 American drama film produced, written, and directed by Liz W. Garcia, and starring Kristen Bell and David Lambert. The film premiered at the 2013 Sundance Film Festival, and was released via video on demand on July 30, 2013, and received a limited release in theaters on August 30.

== Plot ==
Leigh London is a writer living in New York City with a job as a journalist and a relationship with her engaged boss. At the beginning of the story, Leigh must accept the end of her love affair and is tasked with reporting the story of a tiger cub who was kept tied up as a pet in someone's home until it died. To Leigh's astonishment the piece isn't run as serious news, and she breaks down, arguing with her boss and ex-lover. Now entirely disillusioned with her life in the city, she decides to leave—without notifying her job—and return to her hometown. When she arrives at home Leigh's mother questions her sudden return, meanwhile her father is delighted to see her, especially after Leigh announces her decision to stay indefinitely. She becomes reacquainted with two of her former friends, art appraiser, Todd, and vice principal, Mel. While having some drinks with them, she announces that she's taken up her high school job as the community pool lifeguard, where she meets the maintenance man's son, Little Jason.

Over the next few weeks, she becomes friends with Jason and his best friend, Matt, and encourages wild behavior on her two high school friends, hanging out with the teens and smoking pot. Todd happily goes along with Leigh's behavior; while Mel does too, it takes its toll on her relationship with her husband as they are trying to conceive a baby. Leigh begins to spend a lot more time with Jason, and soon she realizes her attraction to him and vice versa. One night, after hanging out at the pool after hours with their friends, Leigh goes to the bathroom/changing room where Jason follows her and they kiss. The kiss quickly escalates into sex, and this starts a relationship between the two that continues over the summer, leading to frequent sexual encounters. One day while the two are having sex in bed, Leigh realizes she's falling in love with Jason and talks him into staying around longer instead of moving to Vermont with Matt as he had planned. Matt has been kicked out by his mother and has made it clear that he is desperate to leave town.

After Jason postpones the Vermont plans, Matt becomes very disheartened. Meanwhile, Mel's husband becomes increasingly frustrated with her "carefree" behavior. While at the pool one morning, Todd discovers Leigh and Jason kissing but doesn't say anything. Leigh's mother asked her to move out as she isn't the only one trying to get their life in order; Leigh stays with Jason. Her cat goes missing in the process. Todd lets it slip to Mel that Leigh is staying at Jason's and Mel discovers the relationship between the two, to her horror. She approaches Leigh in anger and plans to inform Jason's father. Leigh and Jason then go searching for her cat, only to discover Matt has committed suicide by hanging himself from a tree in the woods. Matt repeatedly mentions throughout the film that he hates life in the town and is desperate to get to Vermont. It seems Jason's postponement was his last bit of hope broken.

This takes its toll on Jason very hard and he is deeply distraught. Leigh takes the responsibility to inform Matt's mother, who is also heartbroken at the news. Leigh consoles her until her relatives arrive and then later finds her missing cat hiding near her parents' house. At the funeral, she makes her peace with Mel and goes to meet Jason one last time before they both leave. They share an emotional hug, both showing a strong affection for one another. She gives him $1,000 she won from a journalist prize, and walks away with tears in her eyes, knowing that her feelings for Jason could never truly be acted upon. The final scene ends with a postcard from Jason stating he still thinks about her a lot and Matt also.

== Cast ==
- Kristen Bell as Leigh London
- David Lambert as Little Jason
- Mamie Gummer as Mel
- Martin Starr as Todd
- Alex Shaffer as Matt
- Joshua Harto as John
- Amy Madigan as Justine London
- John Finn as Big Jason
- Paulie Litt as Lumpy
- Sendhil Ramamurthy as Raj
- Adam LeFevre as Hans
- Mike Landry as Officer Miller
- Lisa Ann Goldsmith as Matt's mother
- Terri Middleton as Matt's Aunt

== Production ==
Principal photography began in Sewickley, Pennsylvania, on July 9, 2012, and continued in the Pittsburgh metropolitan area through August 10. A suburban Fox Chapel home was used for most interior shots. The communities of Aleppo, Edgeworth and Leetsdale were also considered as locations.

== Release ==
The film competed at the 2013 Sundance Film Festival for Best Dramatic Film.

=== Home media ===
The Lifeguard was released on DVD on October 8, 2013, and on Blu-ray on November 3, 2015.

== Critical reception ==
On the review aggregator website Rotten Tomatoes, 16% of 32 critics' reviews are positive. Metacritic, which uses a weighted average, assigned the film a score of 34 out of 100, based on 14 critics, indicating "generally unfavorable" reviews.

Peter Debruge of Variety stated: "Drowning in self-pity is about as fun to watch as it sounds, which will mean difficulty getting people interested for any but prurient reasons." Justin Lowe of The Hollywood Reporter: "Not even a checklist of indie film attributes can inject a sense of originality into this familiar narrative." Jordan Hoffmaгуn of Film.com gave the film a 2.7/10 and stated: "The Lifeguard is a painfully dull (alleged) drama utterly lacking in originality or self-awareness."
