= Marcel Sarmiento =

American film director

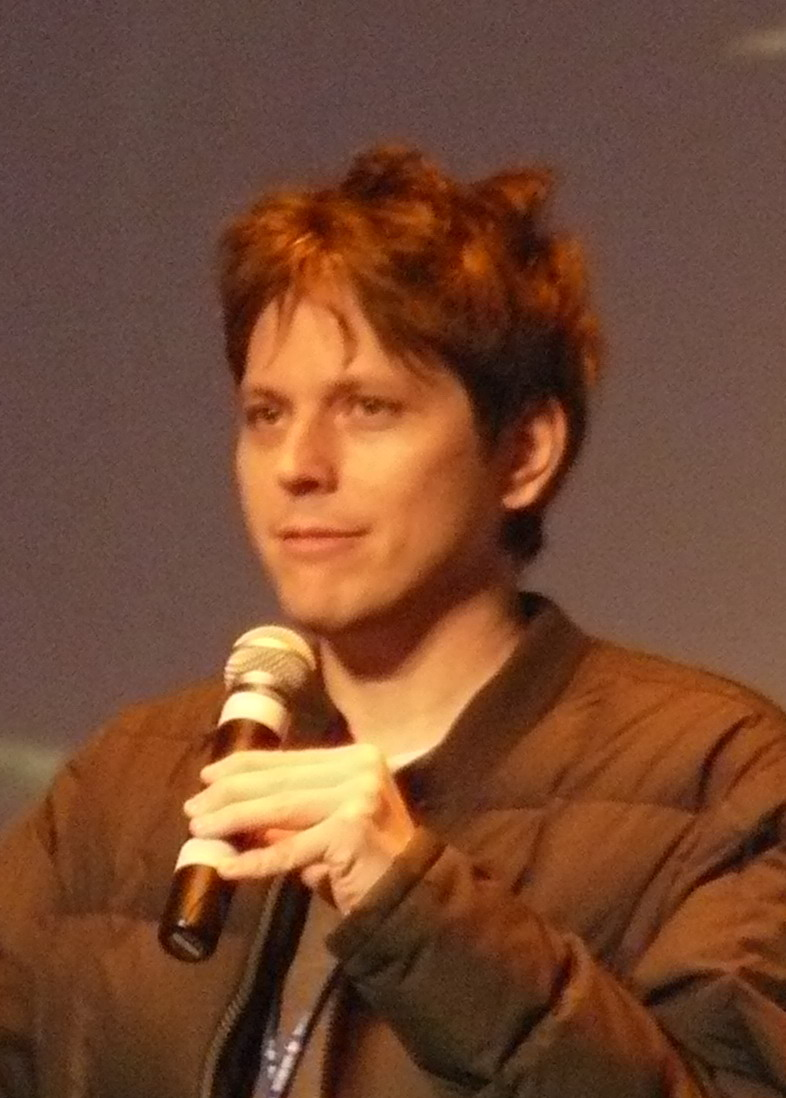
- Born: United States
- Occupations: Film director, screenwriter

Marcel Sarmiento is a film director and writer who has created both comedy and horror films and commercials. He wrote and directed the 2007 comedy Heavy Petting, co-produced and directed the 2008 horror film Deadgirl, and directed a segment Vicious Circles in V/H/S: Viral. Most recently, he co-wrote, produced and directed the upcoming thriller Faceless.

== Career ==
In 2019, he directed The Royal, the true story of Wilkie Mays Aikens, touted from a young age as the next Reggie Jackson, had his career quickly turn disastrous when he fell into drug abuse and was ultimately sentenced to the longest prison time ever given to a professional athlete.

He also co-wrote the story and directed Totem, a supernatural horror film was released by Blumhouse Productions for HBO/Cinemax on October 31, 2017. He was set to direct The Wildness for Bron Studios as of 2016. He is originally a member of Fox Searchlab, but he signed a deal with Fox Searchlight in 2002.

Sarmiento wrote and directed the "D is for Dogfight" segment of The ABCs of Death, an anthology horror film.

In the New York Times review of The ABCs of Death it was stated, "None, however, linger like “D Is for Dogfight,” a mesmeric, slow-motion ballet of brutality so distressingly realistic that you may never be able to name a dog Buddy again."

In addition to film and commercial work, Marcel also serves as the Creative Director for Fun Train, a virtual reality producer of original games for Playstation and Meta Quest, such as "The Exorcist Legion VR" and "Twilight Zone VR". UPLOADVR hailed "The Exorcist: Legion VR is without a doubt one of the best VR horror experiences available."

Marcel has also written screenplays and adaptations for Gold Circle Films and co-wrote the book The Modern Con Man: How to Get Something for Nothing.
