= Space Cadet (2024 film) =

2024 American film by Liz W. Garcia

- Release poster
- Directed by: Liz W. Garcia
- Written by: Liz W. Garcia
- Produced by: Greg Silverman; Jon Berg
- Starring: Emma Roberts; Tom Hopper; Poppy Liu; Gabrielle Union
- Cinematography: John G. Inwood
- Edited by: Oona Flaherty
- Music by: John Debney
- Production company: Stampede Ventures
- Distributed by: Amazon MGM Studios
- Release date: July 4, 2024
- Running time: 111 minutes
- Country: United States
- Language: English

Space Cadet is a 2024 American comedy film written and directed by Liz W. Garcia. It stars Emma Roberts, Tom Hopper, Poppy Liu, and Gabrielle Union.

Rex, a Floridian with little more than a high school diploma, manages to almost complete the NASA space training program before her falsified resumé is exposed, but later redeems herself by becoming the only hope for the crew using her intelligence, empathy, courage and determination.

The film was released internationally online on July 4, 2024.

== Plot ==
Tiffany "Rex" Simpson is a Florida party girl who has always been fascinated with outer space. Although Rex is a gifted amateur inventor who earned a full scholarship to Georgia Tech, she dropped out following her mother's death to care for her father. Now, Rex works as a bartender and alligator wrestler.

At her ten-year high school reunion, Rex encounters her childhood friend Toddrick Spencer, who is now a billionaire specializing in space tourism. After he tells her she was one of his inspirations, she decides to follow her dreams and apply to NASA to become an astronaut. Knowing Rex does not meet most of the requirements, her best friend Nadine heavily embellishes her resume without telling her. This leads her to be accepted to an astronaut training program at the Johnson Space Center.

Although Rex is excited to be at NASA, her outfits and general demeanor initially raise skepticism among the other candidates. At an introductory interview with the NASA board, she discovers what Nadine has done, but manages to salvage the situation without revealing her lack of qualifications. When Rex's roommate Violet accidentally discovers her secret, they agree to help each other.

Violet helps Rex catch up academically, while Rex helps her improve her physical fitness. Rex gradually wins over most of her fellow candidates, as well as program directors Pam Proctor and Logan O'Leary. Although he calls several of her application references, Nadine fakes them using voice acting, Google, and an office soundboard.

As the weeks pass, NASA begins cutting candidates, including Violet, who promises not to reveal Rex's secret, but warns her that it is unlikely to end well. The night before the final training exercise, Rex convinces Logan and most of the remaining candidates to go out to a karaoke bar. The group ends the evening in the Space Center planetarium, where she and Logan almost kiss.

Rex and her colleagues successfully complete the final exercise, a two-week Mars habitat simulation. However, after she begins flight training the next day, Logan discovers her falsified credentials when Nadine accidentally switches to video call while pretending to be a male reference. Although Rex successfully lands the plane, she is expelled from the program.

Ten months later, while Rex has returned to her normal life, her former colleagues head to the International Space Station, but their flight makes the news when meteorite debris becomes stuck in the station door and traps them inside. Rex presents a potential solution to Pam and Logan, who reluctantly allow her and Violet to pilot a rescue mission on Toddrick's spacecraft. Rex's unconventional thinking helps her figure out how to fix the door, and all the astronauts return to Earth safely.

In the epilogue, Rex reveals that she and Violet have become astronauts for Toddrick's company, the two of them and Nadine have started a "space camp" for young girls, and she is now in a relationship with Logan.

== Cast ==
- Emma Roberts as Rex Simpson
- Tom Hopper as Logan O'Leary
- Poppy Liu as Nadine Cai
- Gabrielle Union as Pam Proctor
- Kuhoo Verma as Violet Marie Vislawski
- Desi Lydic as Dr. Stacy Kellogg
- Sebastián Yatra as Toddrick Spencer
- Sam Robards as Calvin Simpson, Rex's dad
- Dave Foley as Rudolph Bolton
- Yasha Jackson as Grace Jackson
- Andrew Call as Captain Jack Mancini
- Josephine Huang as Miriam Osprey
- Troy Iwata as Hector Kaneko
- Tomas Matos as Johnny
- Fergie L. Philippe as Bingo
- Alli Brown as Paris

== Production ==
Principal photography took place in New Jersey from August to October 2022. Union Beach stood in for Cocoa Beach. Shooting occurred at the Bell Labs Holmdel Complex, Essex County Airport, and U.S. Space & Rocket Center.

== Release ==
The film was released by Amazon MGM Studios through its streaming service Prime Video on July 4, 2024.

== Reception ==
On the review aggregator website Rotten Tomatoes, 27% of 30 critics' reviews are positive, with an average rating of 3.8/10. The website's consensus reads: "Never achieving liftoff despite Emma Roberts' peppy performance, Space Cadet flunks out of the school of high-concept comedy." Metacritic, which uses a weighted average, gave the film a score of 40/100 based on ten critics, indicating "mixed or average" reviews.

The Guardian thought the film is "hopelessly muddled, a bitter first sip that proceeds to curdle". The New York Times opined that "the jokes feel tired. The actors are mostly doing their best, but the screenplay too often leaves them mimicking comedy rather than performing it", and it is not "unwatchable, but it's the sort of movie that makes you want to go back and revisit the better versions."
