= Black Museum (Black Mirror) =

- Black Mirror episode
- Promotional poster released as part of the "13 Days of Black Mirror"
- Episode no.: Series 4 Episode 6
- Directed by: Colm McCarthy
- Written by: Charlie Brooker
- Based on: "The Pain Addict" by Penn Jillette (first story)
- Cinematography by: Peter Robertson
- Editing by: Stephen Haren
- Original release date: 29 December 2017
- Running time: 69 minutes

Guest appearances
- Douglas Hodge as Rolo Haynes; Letitia Wright as Nish; Daniel Lapaine as Dr. Peter Dawson; Aldis Hodge as Jack; Alexandra Roach as Carrie; Babs Olusanmokun as Clayton Leigh; Yasha Jackson as Emily; Amanda Warren as Angelica (Nish's mother)

Episode chronology
← Previous
"Metalhead"
Next →
- Bandersnatch (film)
- "Striking Vipers"

"Black Museum" is the sixth and final episode of the fourth season of anthology series Black Mirror. It was directed by Colm McCarthy and written by series creator Charlie Brooker, with one part adapted from a story by Penn Jillette. The episode premiered on Netflix, along with the rest of series four, on 29 December 2017. The episode is divided into three stories, told by Rolo Haynes (Douglas Hodge), the owner of a remote Black Museum. He tells the visitor Nish (Letitia Wright) about the backstories of various exhibits, which involve his previous employment in experimental technologies.

"Black Museum" was filmed over a month in Spain and Nevada, United States. A horror episode, its themes include race and technology. The set contained a large number of Easter eggs referencing previous works in the series. "Black Museum" was met with mixed critical reception: most reviewers found its storyline and characterisation poor and the final plot twist proved polarising. The episode generally received weak rankings by critics in comparison to other Black Mirror episodes. Wright received a Primetime Emmy Award nomination and a Black Reel Award nomination for her acting.

== Plot ==
Nish (Letitia Wright) is driving across the desert, presumably in the United States. While waiting for her car to charge, she visits the remote Black Museum. The proprietor, Rolo Haynes (Douglas Hodge), explains backstories to the museum's crime-related artefacts, starting with a hairnet device.

Rolo previously recruited people for experimental medical technology. In a flashback, Dr. Peter Dawson (Daniel Lapaine) agreed to test an implant that made him feel the physical sensations of the person wearing the hairnet, to help him diagnose patients quickly. After experiencing a man's death, he became aroused by his patients' pain. Developing a masochistic addiction to it, he started mutilating himself for pleasure and eventually murdered a homeless man after forcing the hairnet on him, which caused him to fall into a coma.

In the present, the air conditioner is broken, so Nish offers Rolo water. Moving on to a toy monkey, Rolo describes how he convinced Jack (Aldis Hodge) to transfer his comatose wife Carrie's (Alexandra Roach) consciousness into part of his brain, so she could experience his physical sensations and communicate with him. Jack and Carrie became aggravated by their lack of privacy and agency, respectively. Rolo offered Jack an ability to "pause" Carrie. Months later, Jack un-paused her, and they eventually agreed for her to be un-paused on weekends only. Jack began dating Emily (Yasha Jackson), who wanted Carrie to be deleted. Rolo transferred Carrie to the toy monkey, which could feel sensations and say two phrases ("Monkey loves you" and "Monkey needs a hug"). Carrie and Jack's son Parker was soon bored by it. The monkey technology became illegal due to the limited emotions available, so Rolo was fired.

The museum's centerpiece is a holographic Clayton Leigh (Babs Olusanmokun). Rolo insists he was guilty of murder but Nish reminds him of conflicting evidence. While on death row, Clayton signed up to Rolo's exhibit: when a visitor pulls a lever, a conscious hologram of Clayton receives the electric chair, and a souvenir copy of him experiencing electrocution is made. The exhibit was immensely popular. As Rolo begins to have difficulty breathing, Nish continues the story, revealing herself as Clayton's daughter. After public protests, attendance to the exhibit dwindled to sadists and wealthy white supremacists, who abused Clayton's consciousness so heavily he was left in a vegetative state. Nish's mother Angelica (Amanda Warren) overdosed the day after she saw him. As revenge, Nish sabotaged the air conditioner and gave Rolo poisoned water. Nish transfers Rolo's consciousness into Clayton's hologram, then electrocutes it, which creates a souvenir of Rolo's suffering.

Nish takes the monkey containing Carrie with her and sets the museum on fire. She converses with her mother, whose consciousness is inside her head, like Carrie's was with Jack. She hangs the Rolo souvenir on her car's rear-view mirror, and drives away from the museum as it burns down.

== Production ==
Whilst series one and two of Black Mirror were shown on Channel 4 in the UK, Netflix commissioned the programme for 12 episodes (split into two series of six episodes) in September 2015 with a bid of $40 million. In March 2016, Netflix outbid Channel 4 for the right to distribute the series in the UK. The six episodes in series four were released on Netflix simultaneously on 29 December 2017. "Black Museum" is listed as the last episode, and was also one of the later episodes to be made. Production overlapped with various stages of each of the other five episodes' productions.

=== Conception and writing ===
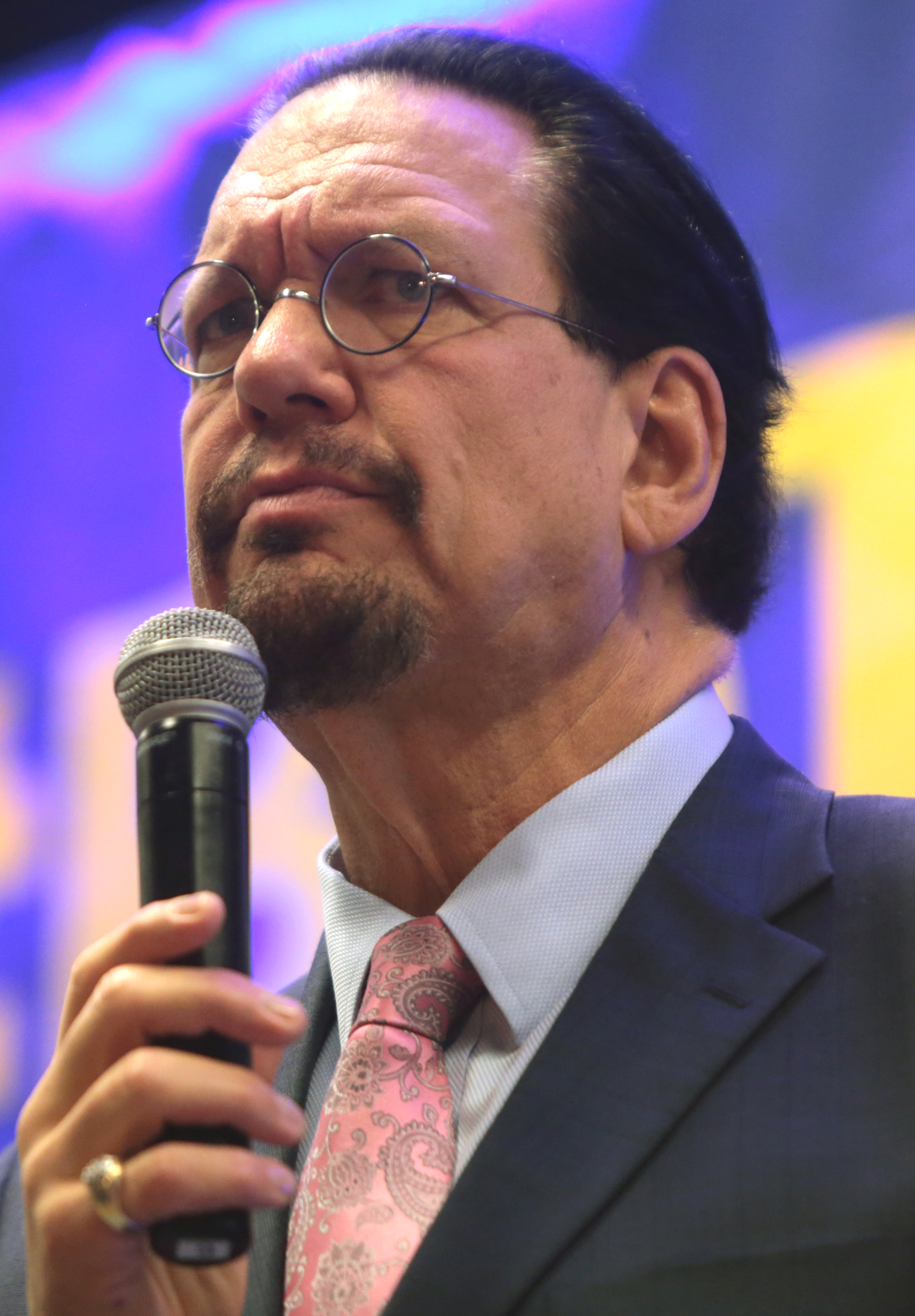
The first story in this episode was based on the short story "The Pain Addict", written by Penn Jillette in the 1980s.

The episode is a combination of three stories, the same structure as the 2014 special "White Christmas". Brooker described it as a narrative of "punishment and racism", similar to series two episode "White Bear", and with a tone resembling the 1990s American horror anthology series Tales from the Crypt. Some of the ideas used in "Black Museum" had been discussed prior to the production of series four. Brooker had conceived earlier of a ghost story involving a digital prisoner who was repeatedly electrocuted. Other ideas from this time included people having other consciousnesses implanted in their brain, such as a person who had an ex-partner in their brain, or a person who rented out parts of their brain to dead people.

The first part of the anthology, involving Dr. Peter Dawson, was based on the short story "The Pain Addict" authored by magician Penn Jillette early in his career. Jillette had written the story based on the personal experience of being ill in a Spanish welfare hospital in 1981, where it was difficult to get a diagnosis due to the language barrier. He conceived of technology that allowed a doctor to understand what pain a person was suffering, but led to the doctor's addiction to the pain of others. The story continued with the doctor "beating people to feel their pain", engaging in sadomasochism and desiring to experience what Jesus felt while being crucified. The idea was published as a short story in the 1988 anthology Would, Could, Should. Jillette met with Brooker before the production of the third series and told him about the story.

Around two years later, Brooker contacted Jillette to explain that he wanted to use "The Pain Addict" as a story in "Black Museum". Jillette then worked with Brooker on the framing story, which would involve a washed-up Las Vegas carny running the Black Museum outside of Vegas. Jillette wanted to audition for the role of the carny, but the production was too far along to change the casting. Brooker took Jillette's past performances as part of Penn & Teller and his documentary series Bullshit! as inspiration for Rolo.

=== Casting and filming ===
The production had previously looked to cast Letitia Wright in an episode of the third series of Black Mirror, but she became unavailable. During casting for "Black Museum", Wright was at the end of shooting for the superhero film Black Panther, where she worked with the star of the first series episode "Fifteen Million Merits", Daniel Kaluuya. She provided a self-tape audition, with Kaluuya reading the other characters' lines. Filming took place immediately after Black Panther's filming ended.

Douglas Hodge starred in the episode as Rolo Haynes, describing his character as a white supremacist and "the most toxic person" he had played. Hodge stayed largely in character during the filming process, staying away from Wright and choosing not to rehearse lines off-screen. Daniel Lapaine appears in this episode as Dr. Peter Dawson, after playing an unrelated role in the series one episode "The Entire History of You".

Colm McCarthy directed the episode. It took a month to film, with locations including Spain and Nevada, United States. Hodge's scenes were shot in chronological order. During the first story, Rolo shows Dr. Dawson a pair of rats, for which stuffed frozen rats were used. The first story also featured a graphic sex scene, which took a long time to film relative to its brief screentime. Scenes which relate to the plot twist of Nish's true intentions at the museum—such as her first sighting of the museum, her handing Rolo water and her entering the exhibit where her father is—were shot in many different ways. Wright played the early scenes as if Nish was the tourist she claims to be.

=== Post-production ===
Brooker and executive producer Annabel Jones participated in the edit of the episode, aiming to find a more human side to Rolo's character at certain points, and omitting some of the darker moments.

The music for the episode was composed by Cristobal Tapia de Veer, who commented on the score: "The beginning, discovering the Black Museum, that was going to set the tone for the rest of the show. The music morphed in many ways throughout the three stories, then goes back to where it started with the Black Museum, although with a sense of accomplishment, but also a sense of doom."

== Marketing ==
External videos
- Black Mirror – Black Museum; Trailer for "Black Museum"
- Black Mirror – Featurette: Black Museum; Commentary by Charlie Brooker, Annabel Jones and Douglas Hodge

In May 2017, a Reddit post unofficially announced the names of the six episodes in series 4 of Black Mirror. The first trailer for the series was released by Netflix on 25 August 2017. Beginning on 24 November 2017, Netflix published a series of posters and trailers for the fourth series of the show, referred to as the "13 Days of Black Mirror". The poster for "Black Museum" was released on 28 November and the trailer on 29 November. On 6 December Netflix published a trailer featuring an amalgamation of scenes from the fourth series, which announced that the series would be released on 29 December.

Cristobal Tapia de Veer's compositions for the episode were released through Lakeshore Records on 19 January 2018. A music sampler was released earlier, on 27 December 2017, on his YouTube and SoundCloud accounts.

== Analysis ==
Sophie Gilbert of The Atlantic found that the episode's structure was very similar to the previous portmanteau instalment "White Christmas". "Black Museum" has a linear narrative and Jacob Oller of Paste believed that the three stories are "darker and darker" as they progress. Tasha Robinson of The Verge commented that it explores the genre of "traditional horror". Louise Mellor of Den of Geek found it the "most cynical episode of the season". Robinson said that the "storytelling style" is as in previous instalments, but not the "moral framework": rather than the notion that "people are terrible" or "technology is dangerous", it revolves around Rolo being "personally loathsome". Mellor commented that the first story is "physically horrid", the second "wickedly cruel" and the third a "sad story" with "no laughs". Reviewing the stories' tones, Robinson found the first to be "dim and claustrophobic", the second "naturalistic" and the last "shot with a grind house seediness".

The episode was compared by Robinson to the 1990s horror anthology series Tales from the Crypt, with Rolo Haynes in a role similar to the cryptkeeper. Christopher Hooton of The Independent compared its racial themes to the 2017 horror film Get Out. The technology allowing Dr. Peter Dawson to experience other people's physical sensations was compared by Charles Bramesco of Vulture to the 19th century novella The Corsican Brothers, about a pair of formerly conjoined twins who can feel the other's pain. Gabriel Tate of The Telegraph found the consciousness transfer into a person's brain to be similar to the comic strip series The Numskulls, where small beings maintain the characters' brains and bodies. Mellor found the use of "(There's) Always Something There to Remind Me" in the ending to be a punchline characteristic of Black Mirror's fourth series.

Rolo Haynes is a "stand-in narrator", according to Steve Green of IndieWire. Bramesco called him a "storyteller" with a role similar to Matt Trent in "White Christmas". Jason Parham of Wired found him to be "an opportunistic sociopath" like the 19th century circus owner P. T. Barnum. Noel Ransome called Rolo "a figure of the white and the western, who senselessly use the black and the misguided for personal gain". The ending saw Rolo the victim of the technology he had created, similar to Robert Daly's outcome in series four episode "USS Callister". Convicted murderer Clayton Leigh's innocence was disputed by critics, Zack Handlen of The A.V. Club finding him innocent but Tate believing it to be ambiguous. Ransome wrote that he serves as "the standard black man", who "begins with enthusiasm and ends with exhaustion". The ending can be interpreted as happy, with Rolo getting what he deserved. Bramesco found that the programme "doesn't condemn" Nish, only the "ugly racism" of Rolo. Parham found the story to be about "cruelty of the prison system" and saw Nish freeing her father as a symbolic act. Greene called Nish's actions "an act of mercy" to Clayton.

The episode includes Easter egg references to each of the 18 previous Black Mirror episodes, according to McCarthy; many were placed by set designer Joel Collins. Gilbert said that this "seemed to definitively tie the Black Mirror universe together". Collins said that he wanted to make the set a "hidden celebration of six years of Black Mirror". For example, Jack is seen reading a comic showing plot points from "Fifteen Million Merits", and the museum's entrance includes a screen showing a picture of Victoria Skillane, a mannequin with a black balaclava and a white two-pronged symbol—all from "White Bear". The two rats shown to Dawson by Haynes are named Kenny and Hector, referencing the main characters from "Shut Up and Dance". The episode also makes multiple allusions to "San Junipero", including the company TCKR, a hospital named Saint Juniper's and Yorkie and Kelly's dresses being on display in the museum.

The term "Black Museum" was the original name for the Crime Museum, a museum of crime artefacts at Scotland Yard in the United Kingdom. Greene believed the museum served as an analogy to the series, which is about "finding addictive entertainment value in the plight of removed dystopias". Many museum items are taken from previous episodes, for instance: an autonomous drone insect (ADI) from "Hated in the Nation"; the lollipop Daly uses to clone Walton's son in "USS Callister"; the tablet used by Marie in "Arkangel"; and the bloodied bathtub where Shazia's husband was murdered in "Crocodile". Separately, one wall of the museum includes a number of death masks, which are busts of crew members.

== Reception ==
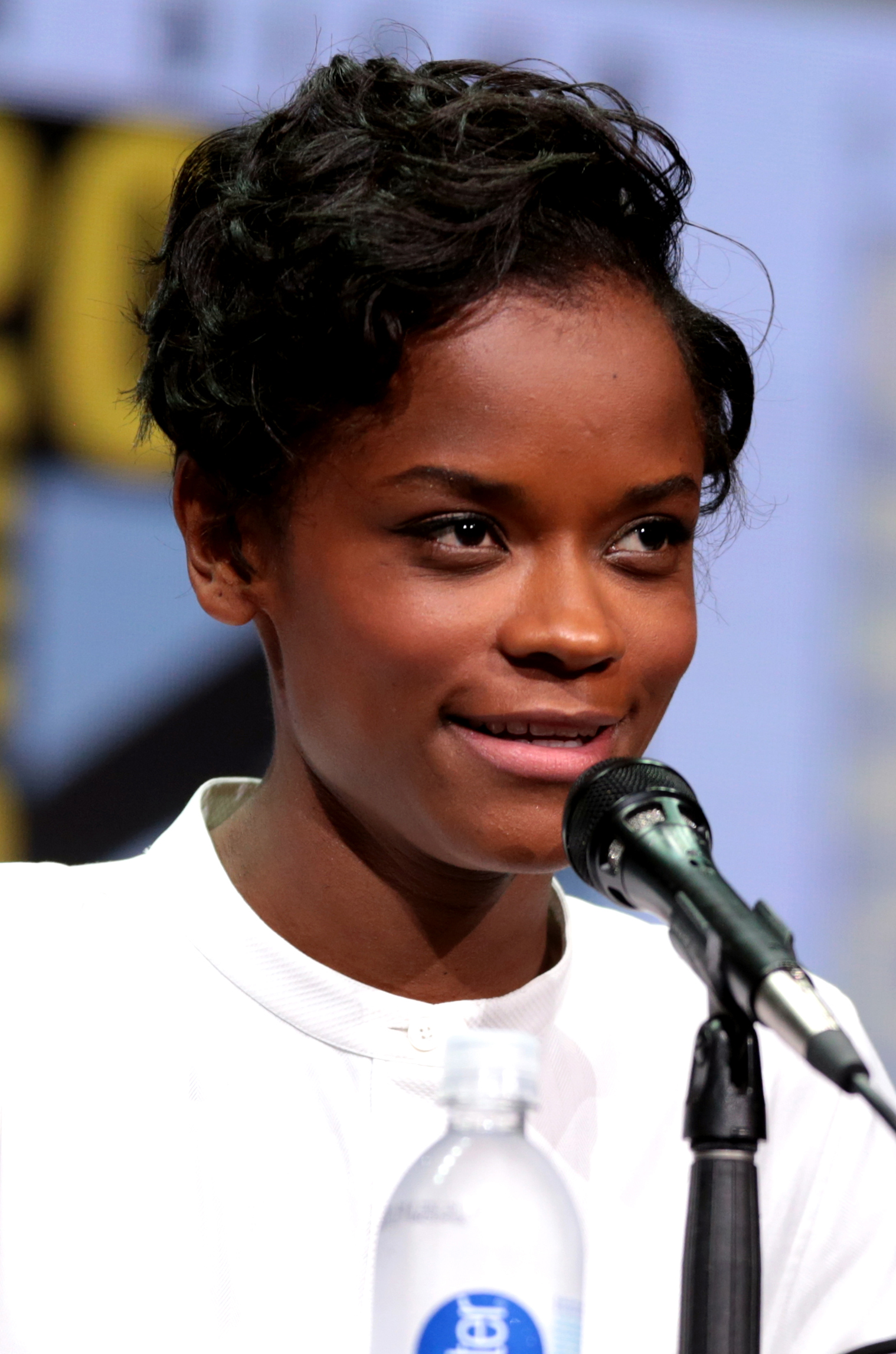
Letitia Wright received a Primetime Emmy Award nomination for her performance.

"Black Museum" received a mixed critical reception. On review aggregator Rotten Tomatoes, it has an approval rating of 75%, based on 28 reviews. The website's critics consensus reads: "Black Mirror goes full Black Mirror in 'Black Museum', an anthology within the anthology that has hits, misses, and plenty of philosophical sinew to chew on." It received ratings of three out of five stars in The Telegraph, a C+ in The A.V. Club and a C− in Entertainment Weekly. Sonia Saraiya of Variety called it the "worst episode" of the series, Darren Franich of Entertainment Weekly finding it the "only outright stinker". Handlen reviewed that its "obvious setups" led to the work lacking "surprise or insight", while Tate found that the characters were not developed well. Robinson reviewed that despite themes of punitive justice and racism, the commentary was "too vague". Contrastingly, Ransome found it the "most satisfying" instalment of the series, commenting that many reviewers "all seemed blind to the episode's overarching thesis on race". Hooton opined that it was "very strong".

Franich criticised that the episode's three stories are only "vaguely connected", Caroline Framke of Vox finding that "none particularly stand out". Saraiya believed that the narrative requires "people repeatedly choosing to be stupid and/or evil". Handlen called the stories "mean-spirited". However, Hooton called the stories "engrossing". Tate found the first to be "competent if predictable", though Gilbert reviewed that the homeless man's murder was "one of the most gratuitously violent scenes" in the show. Tate found the second story the best, though Framke thought it "not especially convincing" and Bramesco believing Jack to be the "dumbest man in history" for agreeing to the consciousness transfer into his head.

The final story and ending received mixed reception. Bramesco found that it "doesn't make a whole lot of sense in terms of storytelling" and Rebecca Nicholson of The Guardian thought it repeated previous themes of the series. Gilbert said it "isn't exactly a satisfying conclusion"; on the other hand, Framke called it "incredibly satisfying". Mellor found the twist to be "great" and "satisfying", though Tate thought only the reveal that Nish's mother's consciousness was inside her head was "genuinely unexpected". Framke called the third story overall "deeply cruel and entirely believable". Mellor commented that the ending was "happy" and "optimistic" and sees "justice done".

McCarthy's role as director was praised by Tate, who said that he "directs with imagination throughout". Oller approved of the episode's "clever visual effects" and use of props. The acting received mixed reception, Tate calling them "serviceable although seldom spectacular." Mellor found that Wright and Hodge offered "two excellent performances", with Gilbert finding Wright the "most compelling". Oller thought that the dialogue was "clunky" in places.

=== Episode rankings ===
"Black Museum" received largely poor rankings on critics' lists of the 23 instalments of Black Mirror, from best to worst:

- 9th – Travis Clark, Business Insider
- 13th – Matt Donnelly and Tim Molloy, TheWrap
- 17th – Charles Bramesco, Vulture
- 18th – Aubrey Page, Collider
- 20th – Corey Atad, Esquire
- 20th – Morgan Jeffery, Digital Spy
- 21st – James Hibberd, Entertainment Weekly
- 23rd – Ed Power, The Telegraph

Instead of by quality, Proma Khosla of Mashable ranked the episodes by tone, concluding that "Black Museum" is the 7th-most pessimistic episode of the show.

Other reviewers ranked "Black Museum" against other series four episodes:

- 2nd – Christopher Hooton, Jacob Stolworthy, The Independent
- 6th (grade: D+) – TVLine

=== Awards and accolades ===
Year	Award	Category	Recipients	Result	Ref.
2018	Primetime Emmy Awards	Outstanding Supporting Actress in a Limited Series or Movie	Letitia Wright	Nominated	
2018	Black Reel Awards	Outstanding Supporting Actor, TV Movie or Limited Series	Babs Olusanmokun	Nominated	
2018	Black Reel Awards	Outstanding Supporting Actress, TV Movie or Limited Series	Letitia Wright	Nominated	
