= Prototype (1992 film) =

- Directed by: Phillip J. Roth
- Written by: Phillip J. Roth (written by) (as Phillip Roth); Gian-Carlo Scandiuzzi (story); Phillip J. Roth (story) (as Phillip Roth)
- Produced by: Gary Jude Burkart; Phillip J. Roth (as Phillip Roth); Gian-Carlo Scandiuzzi; Ron Schmidt (as Ronald Schmidt)
- Starring: Lane Lenhart; Robert Tossberg; Brenda Swanson; Paul Coulj; Mitchell Cox; Sebastian Scandiuzzi
- Cinematography: Mark W. Gray
- Edited by: Daniel Lawrence
- Music by: Emilio Kauderer
- Distributed by: Vidmark Entertainment
- Release date: December 23, 1992
- Running time: 98 minutes
- Country: United States
- Language: English

Prototype, also known as Prototype X29A, is a 1992 post-apocalyptic science fiction film.

== Plot summary ==
Set in a post-apocalyptic Los Angeles of 2057, Hawkins Coselow, a crippled soldier, along with his ex-lover, Chandra Kerkorian, share vivid psychosexual dreams. Dr. Alexis Zalazny is working on a cybernetic program that will help Coselow walk again. The program sort of works, but everything goes deadly wrong when Coselow becomes a killing machine that can interface with any computer. He ends up killing several people belonging to a resistance movement.

The rebels are led by Omegas, cybernetically altered humans, battled government forces in the crime-ridden streets. In time, the Omegas reprogrammed themselves and carried out their own deadly agenda. In the end, the Omegas were destroyed, except one - implanted in a child, Chandra Kerkorian. Now grown, she is ready to lead the rebellion again.

== Cast ==
- Lane Lenhart as Chandra Kerkorian
- Robert Tossberg as Hawkins Coselow
- Brenda Swanson as Dr. Alexis Zalazny
- Paul Coulj as Dr. Taurence Roberts
- Mitchell Cox as Ariel
- Sebastian Scandiuzzi as Sebastian
- Harold Cannon as Rev. Delaney
- Zack Nesis as Teague
- Woon Young Park as Imperia (as Woon Park)
- Bill Barschdorf as Prototype (as Bill Barshdorf)
- Eric Fedorin as Prototype / Street Fighter
- Marcus Aurelius as Toto Mendez (as Marcus Aurelious)
- Mark Holman as Action
- Max Holman as Jackson
- Raymond Storti as Protector
- Rob Lee as Protector
- Tom Pullano as Bobo
- Kato Kaelin as Regalia
- Hien Nguyen as Thorn
- Natasha Roth as Baby Chandra (as Natasha Mozelle Roth)
