= H. B. Gilmour =

American novelist

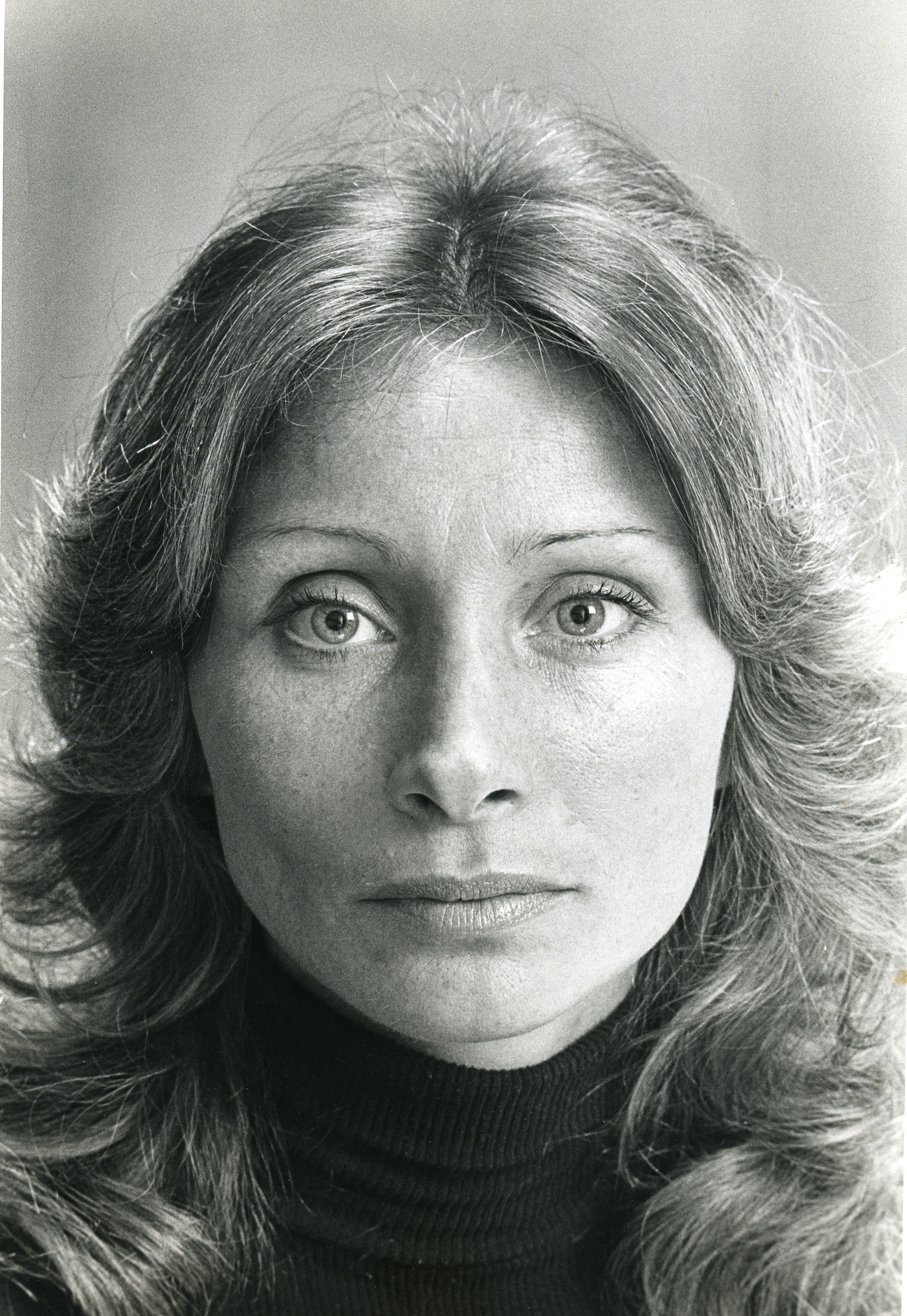
- Born: Harriet B. Gilmour; November 24, 1939 Brooklyn, New York, United States
- Died: June 21, 2009 (aged 69) Cornwallville, New York, United States
- Occupation: Author, publisher
- Spouses: Jules Bemporad; Bruce Gilmour; John Johann (1999–2009)
- Children: Jessica Gilmour

Harriet B. Gilmour (November 24, 1939, Brooklyn, New York – June 21, 2009, Cornwallville, New York) was a bestselling author of movie novelizations and books for young adults and children. She grew up in Williamsburg, Brooklyn with her mother and extended family, and wrote her first poem for Arbor Day when she was eight years old. As a teenager, she moved to Florida to live with her father. She attended college there and then moved back to New York City.

Gilmour's first publishing job was at E. P. Dutton. In 1964, she joined Bantam Books where she worked as a copywriter, editor, and copy chief and as an associate director of marketing. She was married to Bruce Gilmour in 1968. She had a child, Jessica, with him in 1970; they were divorced in 1972. Her first novel The Trade, a trashy paperback about the publishing business, was published in 1969.

She wrote novelizations (including Saturday Night Fever and Pretty in Pink) and children's books (including The Muppets books) while working full-time at Bantam and raising a child on her own. She published her second original novel So Long, Daddy in 1985. The artwork for the dust jacket of the hardcover release includes a photo of her daughter, Jessica. Her third novel was Ask Me If I Care, a book about a teenage girl who gets in with the wrong crowd.

In 1992, she joined the book division at Scholastic, leaving in 1995 to pursue writing full-time. She focused her energy on books for "tweens" and children. Gilmour's best-known novels are the Clueless series with author Randi Reisfeld.

She met John Johann, whom she would later marry, in 1992. They moved to Cornwallville in upstate New York where she lived until her death. She died on June 21, 2009, of pneumonia due to complications from lung cancer.

== Books ==
- The Trade (1973)
- Saturday Night Fever (1977)
- Eyes of Laura Mars (1978)
- All That Jazz (1979)
- Electric Horseman
- So Long, Daddy
- Even Kermit Gets Angry
- Why Wembley Fraggle Couldn't Sleep
- The Giant Next Door
- Pretty in Pink (1986) (with Randi Reisfield)
- Fatal Attraction (1988)
- Ask Me If I Care
- Wedded To Crime: The Autobiography of a Mafia Wife (with Sandy Leibowitz)
- The Amazing Zoo
- One Fine Day
- Clarissa Explains It All
- Godzilla: A Junior Novelization (1998) (Nickelodeon Kids Choice Awards Nominee)
- Curse of Katana
- Spontaneously Combustible
- My Fantasy Dream Date With......
- Making Waves (with Randi Reisfeld)
- Oh Baby! (with Randi Reisfeld)
- Twitches series (with Randi Reisfeld)
- Clueless series (with Randi Reisfeld)
