= Clueless (novels) =

Series of novels by H.B. Gilmour

Clueless is a series of young adult novels, mainly written by H. B. Gilmour and Randi Reisfeld. The series is published by Simon & Schuster. The series was generated after the release of the 1995 film of the same name.

== Novels ==
1. Clueless (H. B. Gilmour) (1995)
2. Cher Negotiates New York (Jennifer Baker)
3. An American Betty in Paris (Randi Reisfeld)
4. Achieving Personal Perfection (Gilmour)
5. Cher's Furiously Fit Workout (Reisfeld)
6. Friend or Faux (Gilmour)
7. Cher Goes Enviro-Mental (Reisfeld)
8. Baldwin from Another Planet (Gilmour)
9. To Hottie to Handle (Reisfeld)
10. Cher and Cher Alike (Gilmour)
11. True Blue Hawaii (Reisfeld)
12. Romantically Correct (Gilmour)
13. A Totally Cher Affair (Gilmour)
14. Chronically Crushed (Reisfeld)
15. Babes in Boyland (Gilmour)
16. Dude with a Tude (Reisfeld)
17. Cher's Frantically Romantic Assignment (Gilmour)
18. Extreme Sisterhood (Reisfeld)
19. Southern Fried Makeover (Carla Jablonski)
20. Bettypalooza (Elizabeth Lenhard)
21. Cher's Guide to... Whatever (Gilmour)
