= Twitches Too =

2007 television film by Stuart Gillard

- Film poster
- Written by: Daniel Berendsen
- Directed by: Stuart Gillard
- Starring: Tia Mowry; Tamera Mowry
- Theme music composer: John Van Tongeren
- Original language: English

Production
- Cinematography: Manfred Guthe
- Editor: Robin Russell
- Running time: 83 minutes
- Production companies: Zachary & Evie Productions, Inc. Carla/Singer Productions; Disney Channel Original Productions
- Budget: $26.5 million

Original release
- Network: Disney Channel
- Release: October 12, 2007

Related
- Twitches (2005)

Twitches Too is a 2007 American fantasy drama film released as a Disney Channel Original Movie. It is the sequel to the Disney Channel Original Movie Twitches, released in 2005. The film began production in late April 2007 and was released on October 12.

== Plot ==
In the magical land of Coventry, Queen Miranda is in King Aron's study speaking to his portrait how much she misses him. She exits the room followed by a shadow, waves her hand and a wall conceals the opening. In the Earth dimension, Camryn makes a mess when she tries to magically put dishes into a dishwasher. Alex is living with them because she is going to Waverly University. Karsh and Ileana show up and announce they are getting married and that Miranda wants to see them. Alex does not go because she does not want to miss her first day of classes, so Camryn goes by herself, she then meets a handsome man named Demitri. She believes him to be a prince, but he is a powerless kitchen servant. At school, Alex meets Marcus, who is Camryn's ex-boyfriend. He mistakes her for Camryn until Beth tells him otherwise.

Alex and Camryn receive clues that their father is alive in the Shadowlands. Miranda believes that Thantos is becoming powerful again, and wants the girls to use a vanquishing spell during a solar eclipse, when their powers will be at their strongest. If they perform the spell, everything in the Shadowlands will be destroyed, including their father Aron. Alex does not want to do it, but Camryn finishes the vanquishing spell. Alex finds a possible way to bring Aron from the Shadowlands but brings back Thantos. He goes off to destroy Aron's Shadow, who was the shadow present on Earth. Camryn and Alex follow, and when Thantos takes Aron back to Coventry, everyone is locked out. Demitri helps them get into the castle. When asked how, he reveals that Miranda returned his powers to him. Together as one, Camryn, Alex, and Miranda bring Aron back and he defeats Thantos, who falls down a portal, sending him to the afterlife.

Karsh and Ileana marry. Everyone is there: David and Emily, their housekeeper, and even Beth and Marcus. Camryn and Demitri share a loving look. Then she waves to Beth while Marcus and Alex wink at each other. Marcus whispers to Beth: "I can't believe you're not more freaked out about this." Beth replies, "What's there to be freaked out about? I'm just jealous she's got this much room in the back of her closet." Karsh and Ileana exchange rings and Aron and Miranda pronounce them husband and wife. They kiss and have the reception. The twins, Ileana, Karsh, Emily, David, Miranda and Aron, are all chanting, "Go Twitches, Go Twitches!"

== Cast ==
- Tia Mowry as Alexandra "Alex" Nicole Fielding / Artemis DuBaer
- Tamera Mowry as Camryn "Cam" Elizabeth Barnes / Apolla DuBaer
- Kristen Wilson as Miranda/Minerva DuBaer, the twins' mother, Aron's wife and Thantos' sister-in-law. The Queen of Coventry Wilson also played her evil twin sister out for revenge for the alternate ending.
- Patrick Fabian as Thantos DuBaer, Aron's brother, Miranda's brother-in-law and the twins' paternal uncle. Thought to have killed Aron.
- Pat Kelly as Karsh, the Protector of Princess Artemis and Royal Servant of the King and Queen. Marries Ileana at the end of the film.
- Leslie Seiler as Ileana, the Protector of Princess Apolla and Royal Servant of the King and Queen. Marries Karsh at the end of the film.
- Karen Holness as Emily Barnes, Camryn's adoptive mother who is more laid back than her husband.
- Arnold Pinnock as David Barnes, Camryn's adoptive father and a very stressed individual.
- Kevin Jubinville as Aron DuBaer, the twins' father, Miranda's husband and Thantos' brother. Thought to have been killed by Thantos. Aron was able to cling to life in shadows.
- Jayne Eastwood as Norseng
- Jackie Rosenbaum as Beth Fish, Camryn's best friend.
- Nathaniel Stephenson as Marcus Warburton, Camryn's boyfriend.
- Chris Gallinger as Demitri, a servant in the royal kitchens. Camryn becomes smitten with him, thinking he is royalty.

== Production ==
=== Casting ===
All of the cast reprise their roles, except for Jennifer Robertson, who played Ileana in the original movie. The character of Ileana is played by the actress Leslie Seiler in this sequel. David Ingram did not return as Aron; he was replaced by Kevin Jubinville.

=== Filming ===
Filming for Twitches Too began in April 2007 on location in Toronto, with Casa Loma being one of the filming locations. More special effects were used in this movie than the original, so most scenes were filmed using a green screen. Scenes where certain cast members had to fly were also filmed with a green screen, and the actors wore harnesses. When filming, the castle set was elevated nine feet high to give the illusion that the cast were up really high. Green bands were also attached to the bottom of the castle set in order to edit the background elements during post-production that blended in with the world of Coventry.

== Release and reception ==
It aired during Disney Channel's Halloween Month. The first trailer was released during the premiere of High School Musical 2. On its premiere night, the movie brought in 6.96 million viewers. For 15 years, it was the last non-musical Disney Channel Original Movie sequel to be produced until Under Wraps 2 (2022).

== See also ==
- List of films about witchcraft
