= Liz W. Garcia =

American television producer and writer (born 1977)

- Born: 1977 (age 48–49)
- Occupations: Television producer and writer
- Years active: 1988–present
- Spouse: Joshua Harto (m. 2008)
- Children: 1

Liz W. Garcia is an American television producer and writer.

== Career ==
As a writer her credits include Dawson's Creek, Wonderfalls and Cold Case (also executive story editor and consulting producer).

Garcia's film credits include working as a production assistant on the 1988 film Return of the Killer Tomatoes. She was also an assistant to Ed Decter and John J. Strauss in the 2002 film The New Guy.

In 2010, she co-created the TNT series Memphis Beat starring Jason Lee. She co-created the series with her husband, actor Joshua Harto. The series ended the following year after two seasons.

Garcia wrote and directed The Lifeguard, which began filming in July 2012 starring Kristen Bell. She also wrote and directed One Percent More Humid, starring Juno Temple and Julia Garner, which was released in 2017.

More recently, she signed an overall deal with Entertainment One. Garcia cowrote the film Purple Hearts, which was released in 2022.

== Personal life ==
Garcia is a graduate of Wesleyan University. She married actor Joshua Harto in 2008, and they have a son together.
