= Housley =

Housley is a surname. Notable people with the surname include:

- Adam Housley (husband of actress Tamera Mowry) (born 1972), joined Fox News Channel (FNC) in 2001 as a Los Angeles-based correspondent
- Frankie Housley (1926–1951), the lone stewardess on National Airlines Flight 83, which crashed in January, 1951
- Norman Housley, Professor of History and head of the School of Historical Studies at the University of Leicester
- Phil Housley (born 1964), former ice hockey player
