= The Masked Singer (American TV series) season 5 =

Season of television series

The Masked Singer
- Season 5
- Promotional poster for season five, featuring costumes from previous seasons in the background
- Starring: Robin Thicke; Jenny McCarthy Wahlberg; Ken Jeong; Nicole Scherzinger
- Hosted by: Nick Cannon; Niecy Nash
- No. of contestants: 14
- Winner: Nick Lachey as "Piglet"
- Runner-up: JoJo as "Black Swan"
- No. of episodes: 12

Release
- Original network: Fox
- Original release: March 10 – May 26, 2021

Season chronology
- ← Previous; Season 4 Next → Season 6

The fifth season of the American television series The Masked Singer premiered on Fox on March 10, 2021, and concluded on May 26, 2021. The season was won by singer Nick Lachey as "Piglet", with singer JoJo finishing second as "Black Swan", and rapper Wiz Khalifa placing third as "Chameleon".

== Panelists and hosts ==
Season 5 panelists and hosts

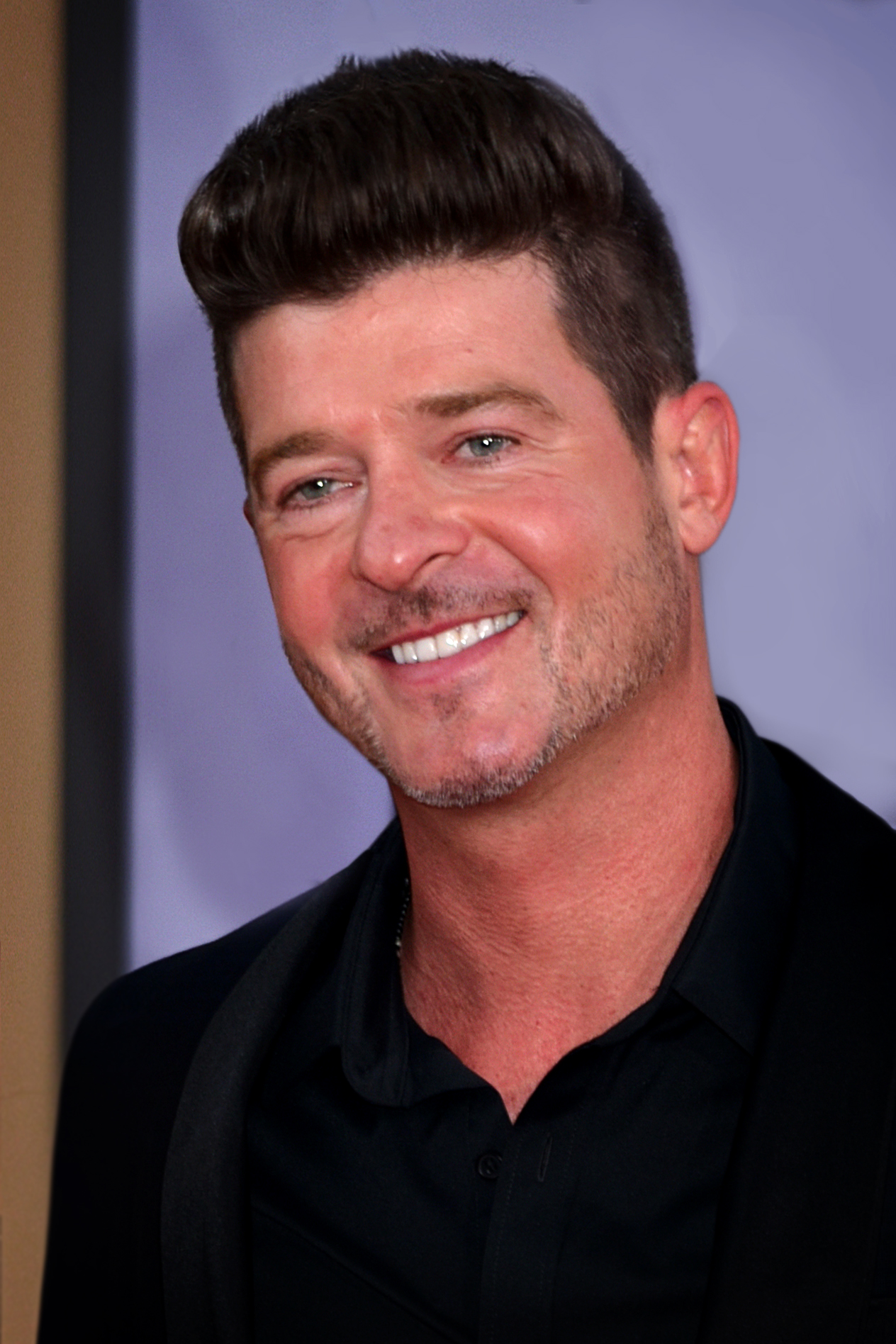
Robin Thicke

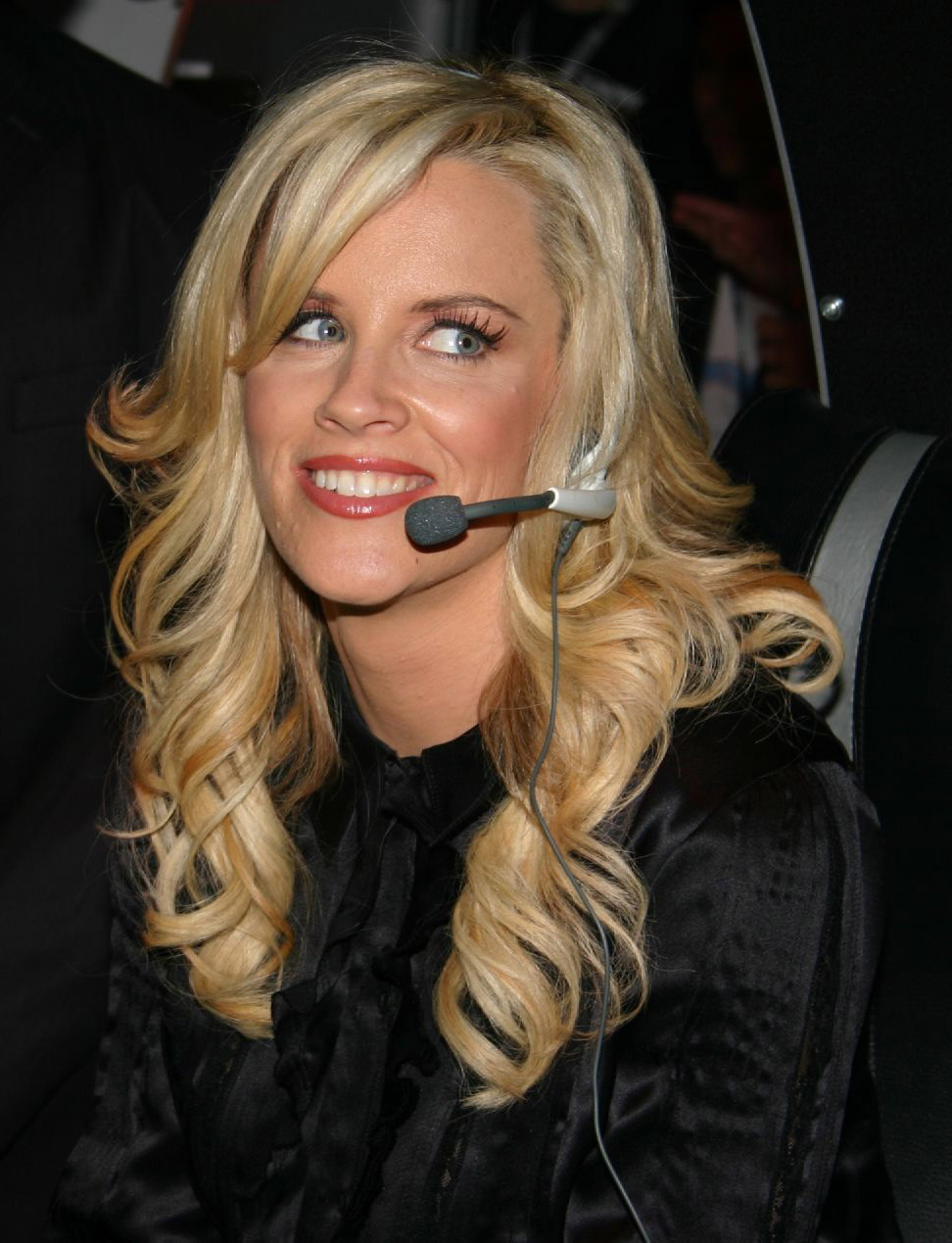
Jenny McCarthy Wahlberg

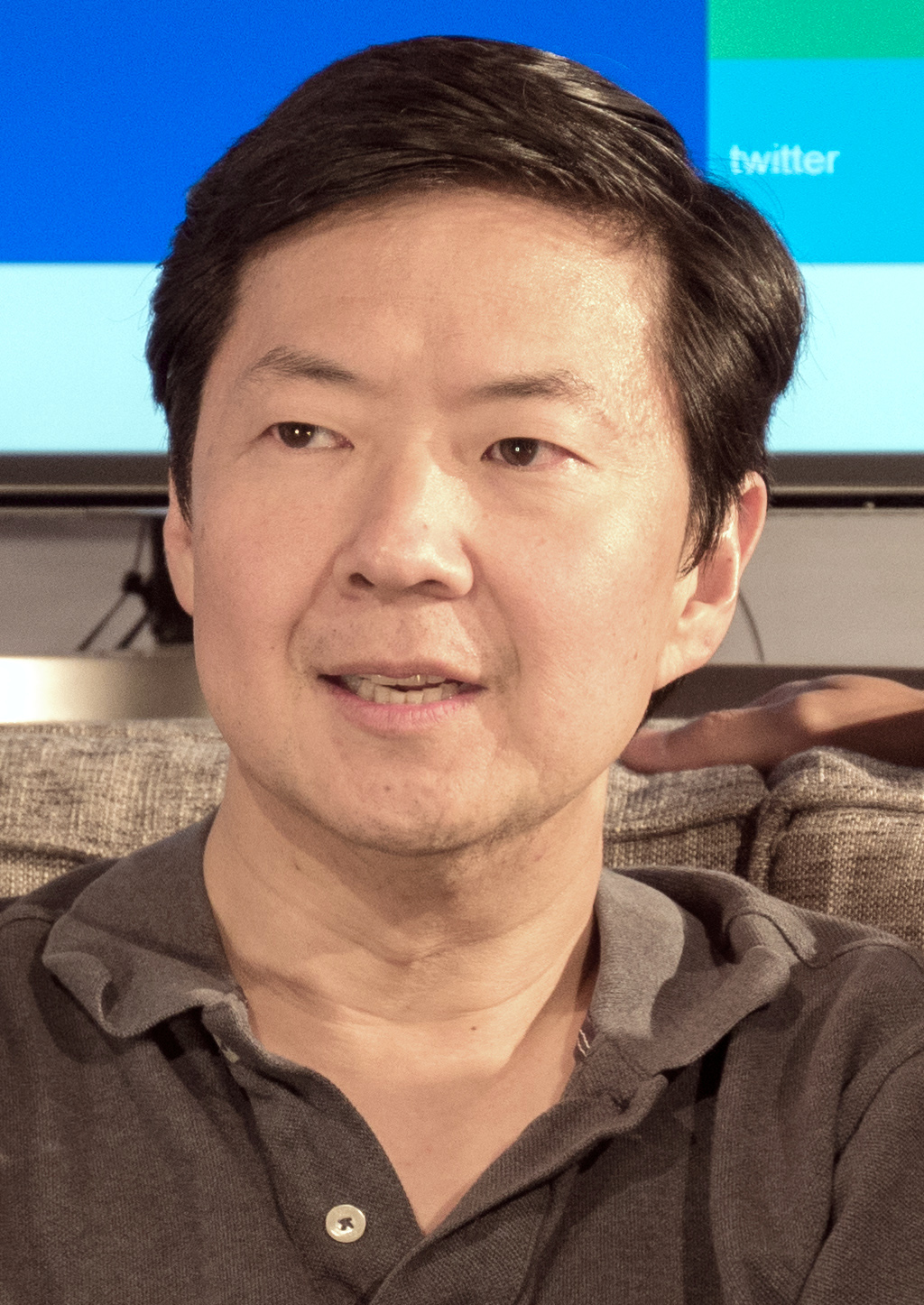
Ken Jeong

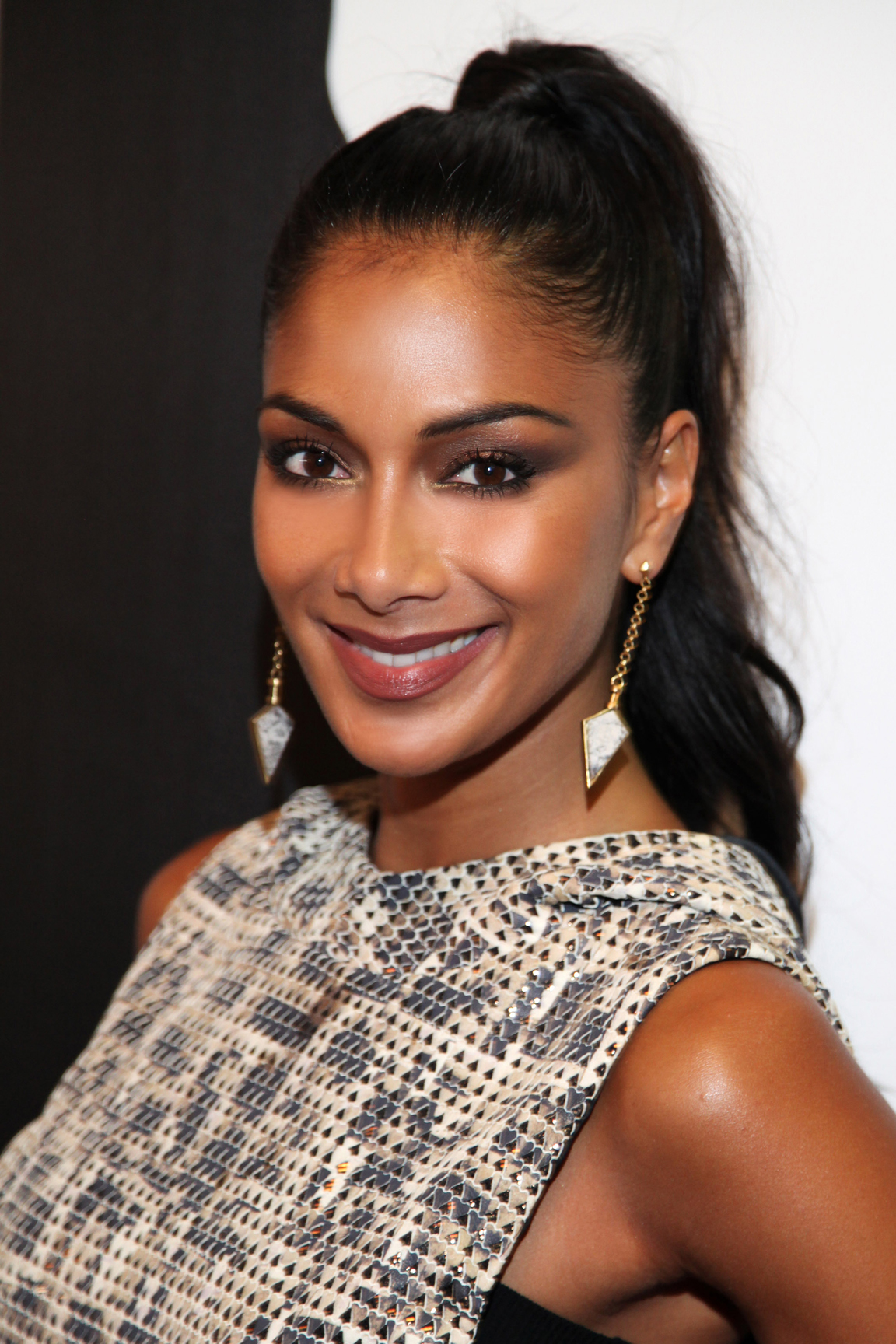
Nicole Scherzinger

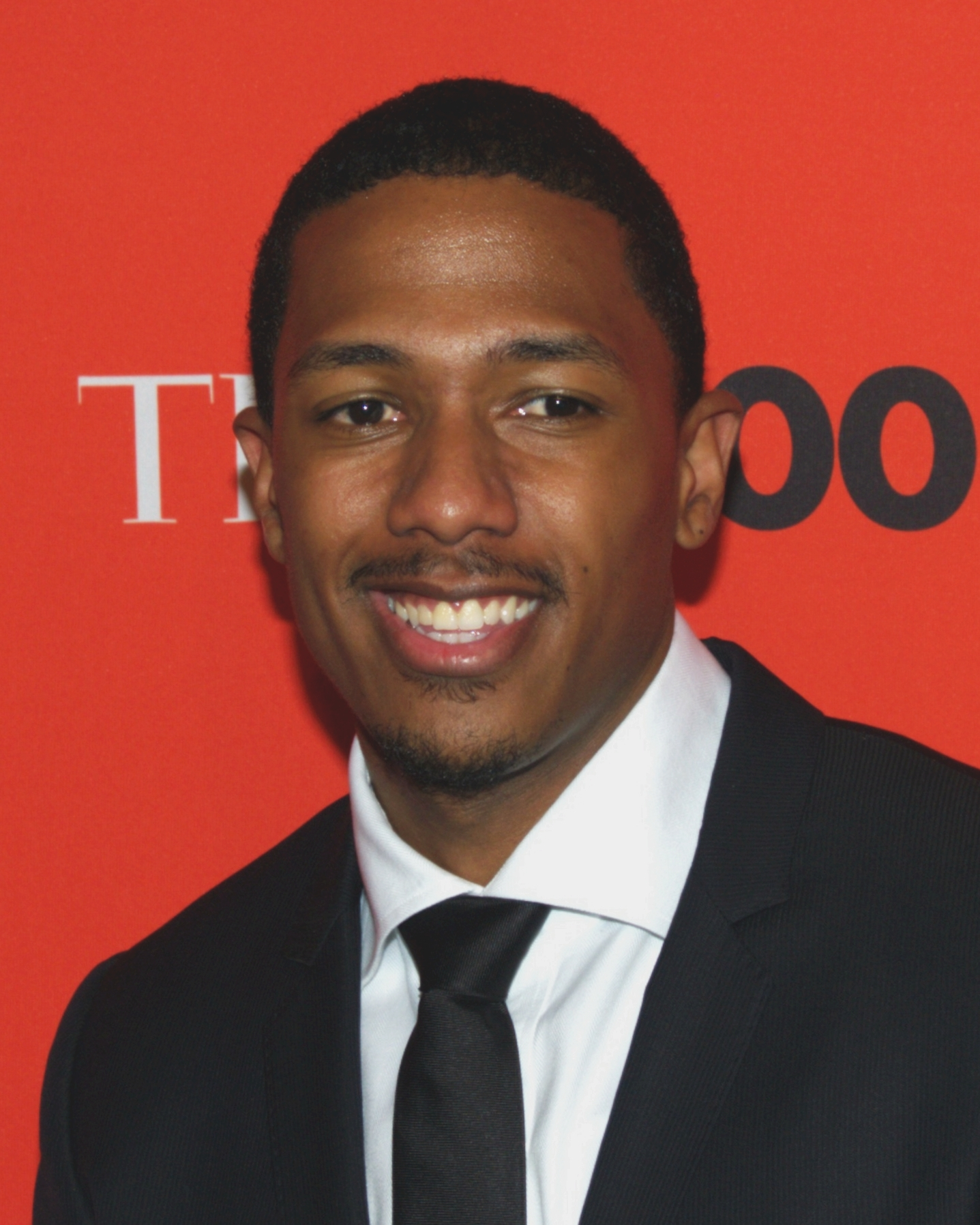
Nick Cannon

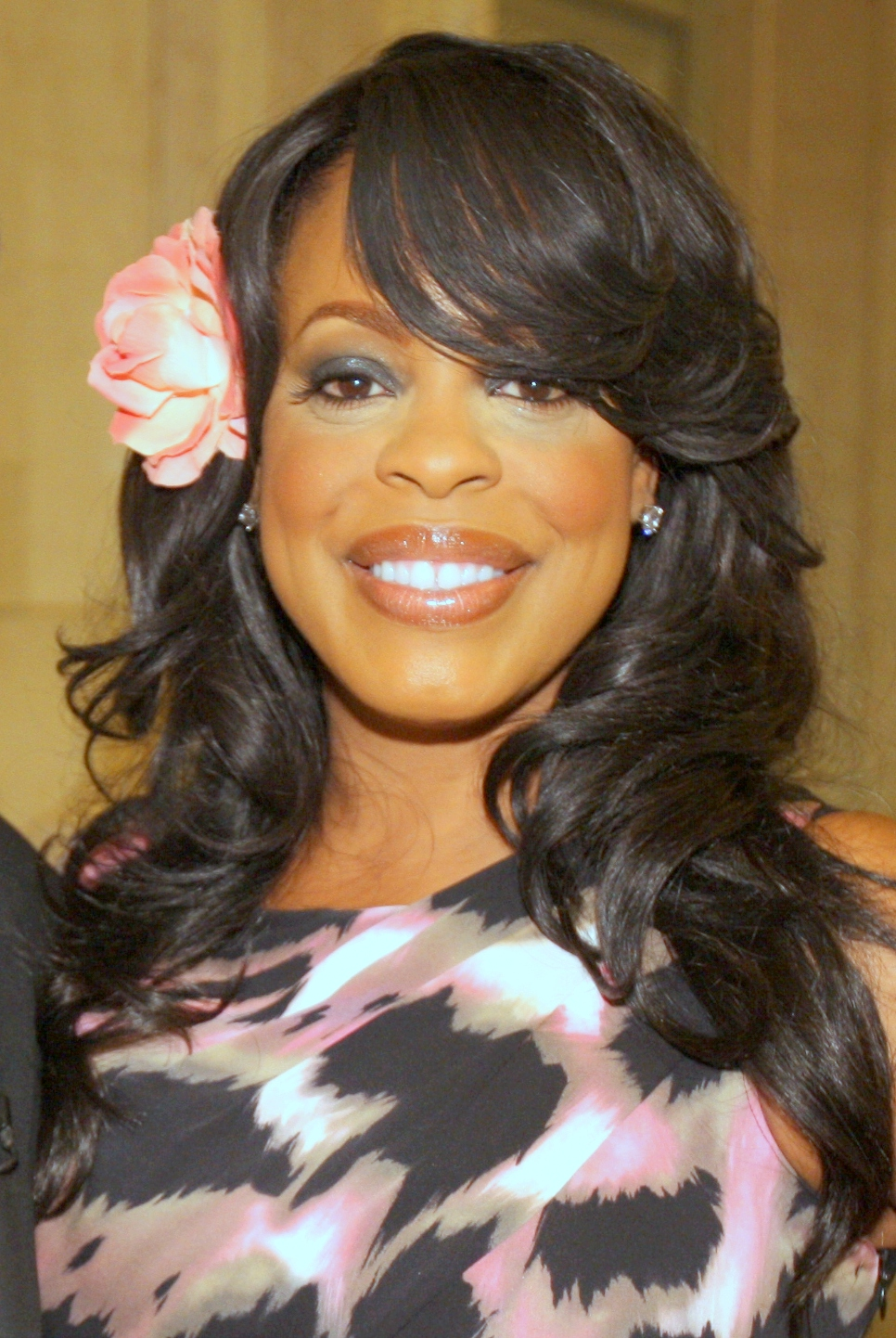
Niecy Nash

Singer-songwriter Robin Thicke, television and radio personality Jenny McCarthy Wahlberg, actor and comedian Ken Jeong, and recording artist Nicole Scherzinger all returned for their fifth season as panelists. The panelists once again competed for "The Golden Ear", with Jenny McCarthy Wahlberg winning for the second time. Regular host Nick Cannon tested positive for COVID-19 a few days before production was set to begin in February 2021; consequently, Niecy Nash guest hosted the first five episodes. Cannon returned after competing as "the Bulldog" in the fifth episode.

Guest panelists included Joel McHale in the third episode, Rita Wilson in the seventh episode, Chrissy Metz in the eighth episode, Rob Riggle in the ninth episode, Darius Rucker in the tenth episode, and season four winner LeAnn Rimes in the eleventh episode.

== Contestants ==
The season began with two groups of five, Group A and Group B. In a new twist, four wild card contestants entered the competition beginning with the third episode, replacing previously eliminated contestants. The contestants among the season have a combined, "26 Grammy nominations, nine multi-platinum singles, four Oscar nominations, three Super Bowl appearances, six gold medals and two world records among them". In addition, the opening scene for the season premiere revealed that cast has, "a combined net worth over $600 million, eight marriages, 25 gold and platinum records, 459 tattoos, over 55 million records sold, over 198 million followers, three Grammy wins, three Emmy nominations, one Oscar win, nine divorces, and 146 toes."

This season featured a non-contestant masked character called "Cluedle-Doo". Over the course of 10 episodes, Cluedle-Doo periodically disrupted the broadcast to provide additional clues to the audience from his secret studio, teasing the host and panelists, while challenging the audience to discover who he was. In the semi-final episode, he appeared in person to perform "Return of the Mack" by Mark Morrison for the panel, then challenged them to guess his identity. After the panelists made their guesses who he was, none of which was correct, he unmasked himself as singer Donnie Wahlberg, panelist Jenny McCarthy Wahlberg's husband, shocking McCarthy Wahlberg, who did not recognize his voice.

Kermit the Frog ("Snail") is the first fictional character to have competed on the American version of The Masked Singer and "Russian Dolls" (Hanson) are the second costume to feature more than one person (the first being Clint and Lisa Black's "Snow Owls" costume from the previous season) and the first costume to feature a group of different celebrities.

Results
Stage name	Celebrity	Occupation(s)	Episodes										
Stage name	Celebrity	Occupation(s)	1	2	3	4	5	6	7	9	10	11	12
Stage name	Celebrity	Occupation(s)	Group A	Group B	A	B		A	7	9	10	11	12
Piglet	Nick Lachey	Singer		SAFE		SAFE	SAFE		SAFE	SAFE	SAFE	SAFE	WINNER
Black Swan	JoJo	Singer		SAFE		SAFE	SAFE		SAFE	SAFE	SAFE	SAFE	RUNNER-UP
Chameleon	Wiz Khalifa	Rapper		SAFE		SAFE	SAFE		SAFE	SAFE	SAFE	SAFE	THIRD
Yeti (WC)	Omarion	Singer						SAFE	SAFE	SAFE	SAFE	OUT	
Russian Dolls (Note: The character performed in two costumes during the first and fifth performances and in three costumes during the second and third performances. When revealed, Taylor, Isaac, and Zac Hanson were underneath the main Russian Doll costume. Performances that utilized four costumes had one being used as a prop.)	Hanson	Band	SAFE		SAFE			SAFE	SAFE	SAFE	OUT		
Robopine (Note: The character was originally introduced as "Porcupine"; his name was changed to "Robopine" before his first performance.)	Tyrese Gibson	Actor/singer	SAFE		SAFE			SAFE	SAFE	OUT			
Seashell	Tamera Mowry-Housley	Actor/TV host	SAFE		SAFE			SAFE	OUT				
Crab (WC)	Bobby Brown	Singer				SAFE	SAFE		OUT				
Orca (WC)	Mark McGrath	Singer			SAFE			OUT					
Bulldog (WC)	Nick Cannon	Actor/TV host					OUT (Note: No vote was made by the panelists and superfans. Instead, Nash selected "Bulldog" to be eliminated. It was then unmasked to be Cannon, as part of transitioning the show's host duties back to him without the final guesses being obtained.)						
Grandpa Monster	Logan Paul	Internet personality		SAFE		OUT							
Raccoon	Danny Trejo	Actor	SAFE		OUT								
Phoenix	Caitlyn Jenner	Decathlete/TV Personality		OUT									
Snail	Kermit the Frog (Note: Kermit was voiced and performed by Matt Vogel, though Vogel was not revealed on camera.)	Muppet	OUT										

The masked singer was safe from elimination.
The masked singer was eliminated from the competition and unmasked.
The masked singer did not perform.

(WC) This masked singer is a wild card contestant.

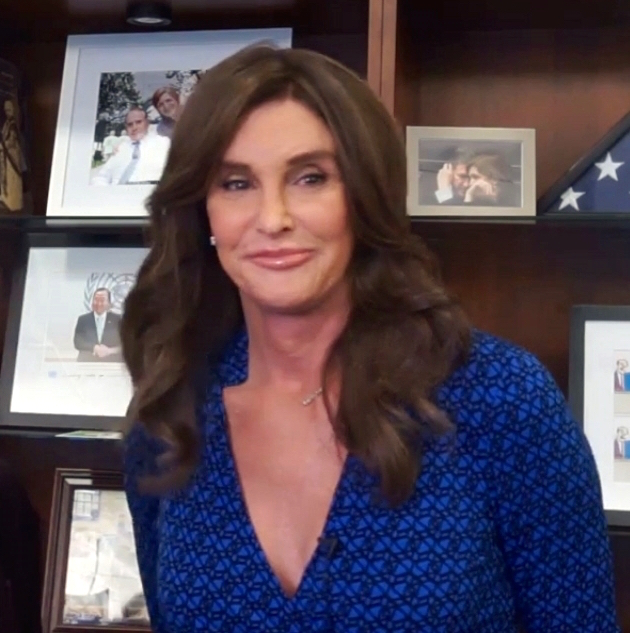
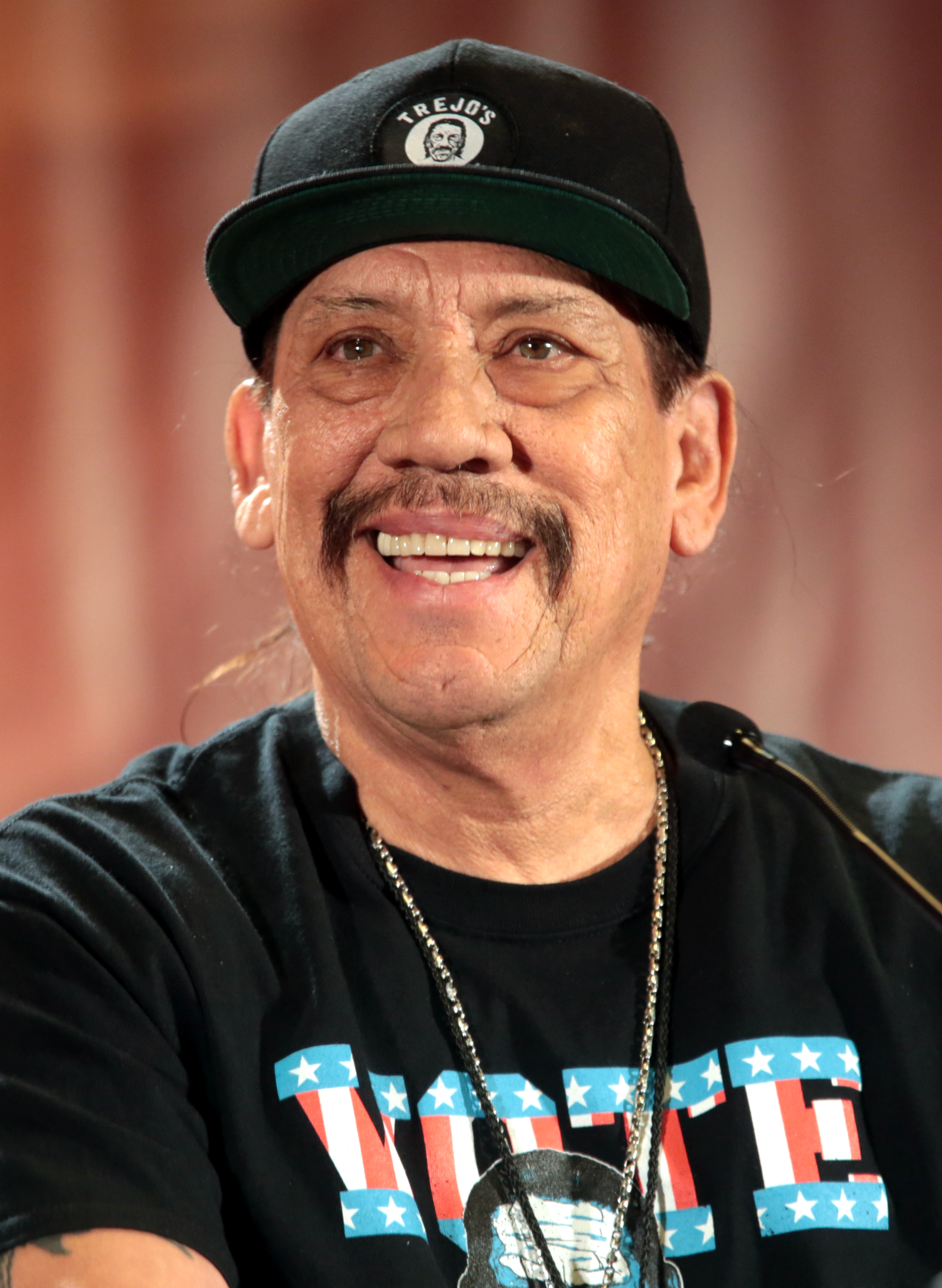
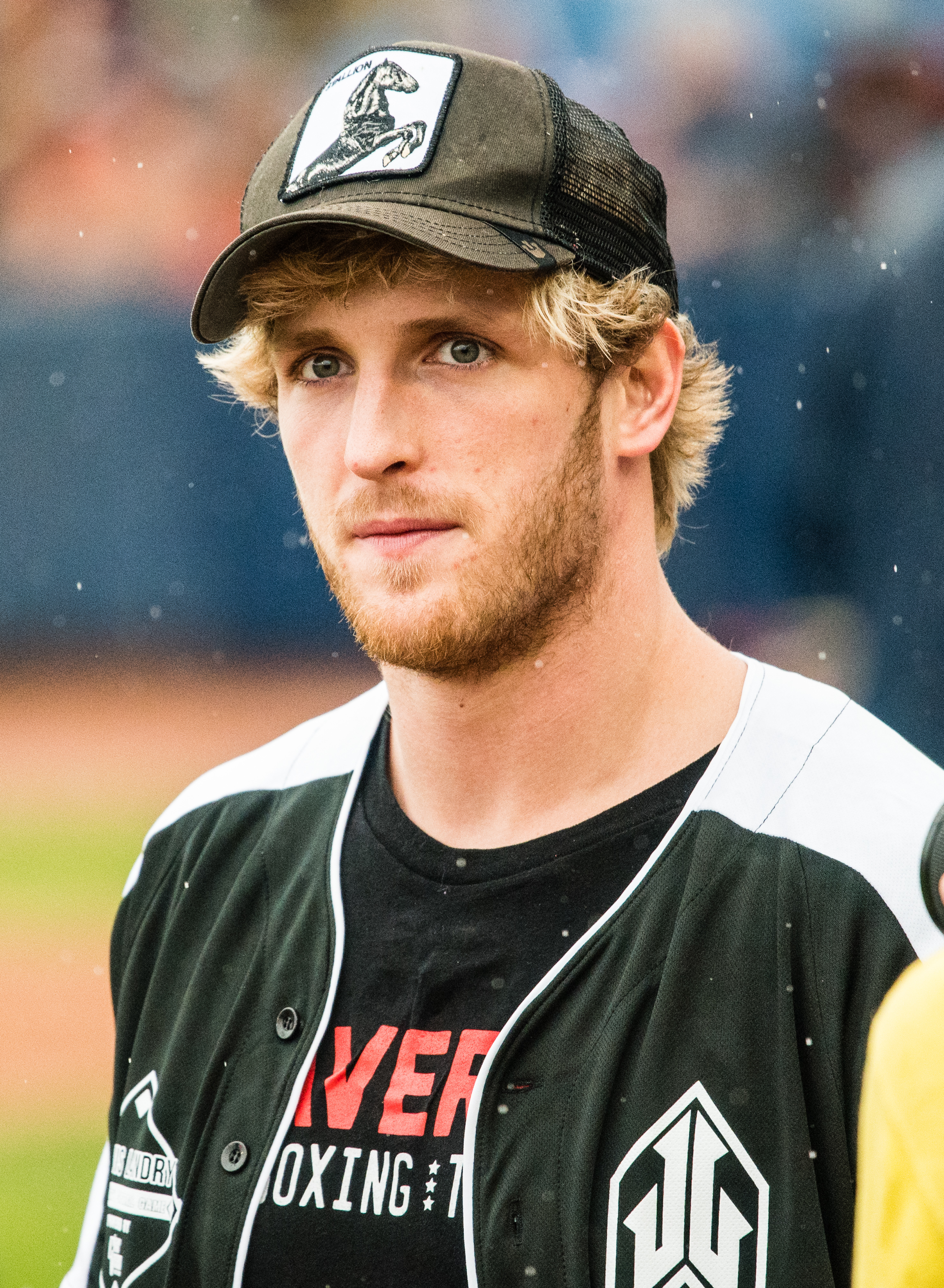
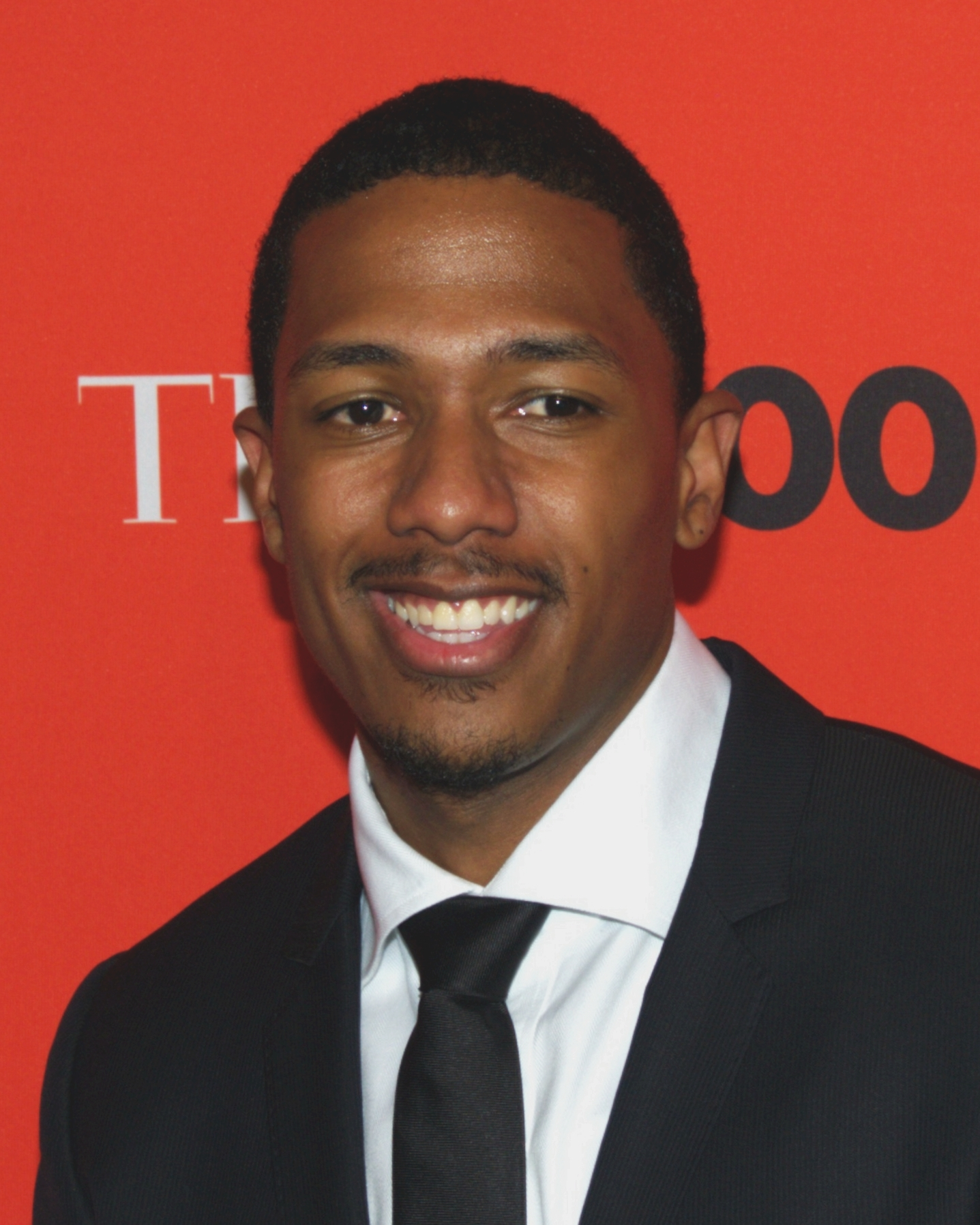
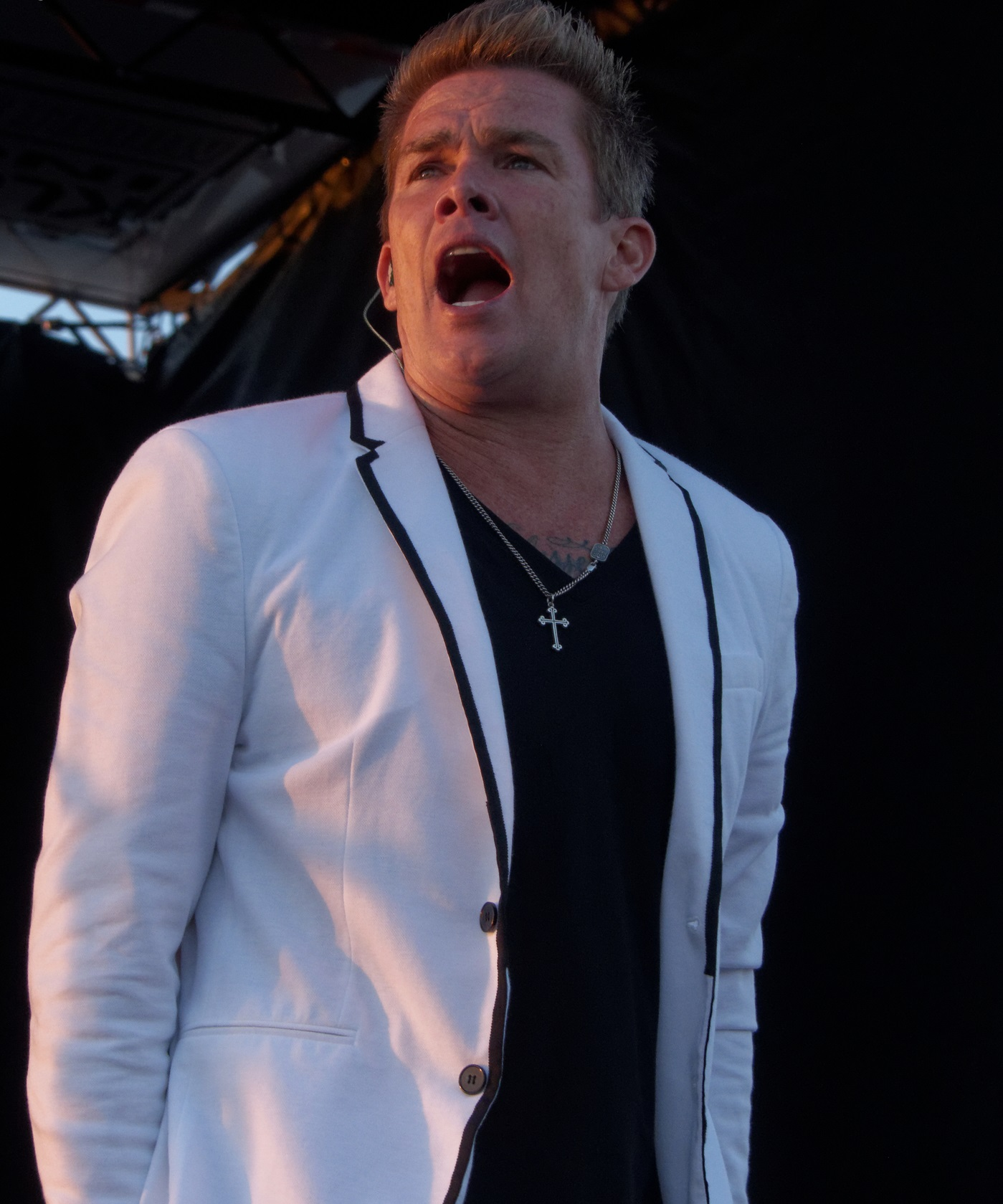
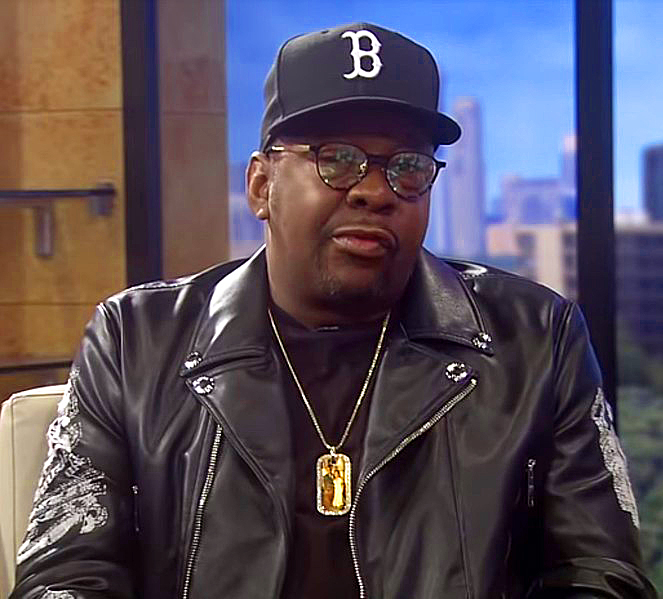
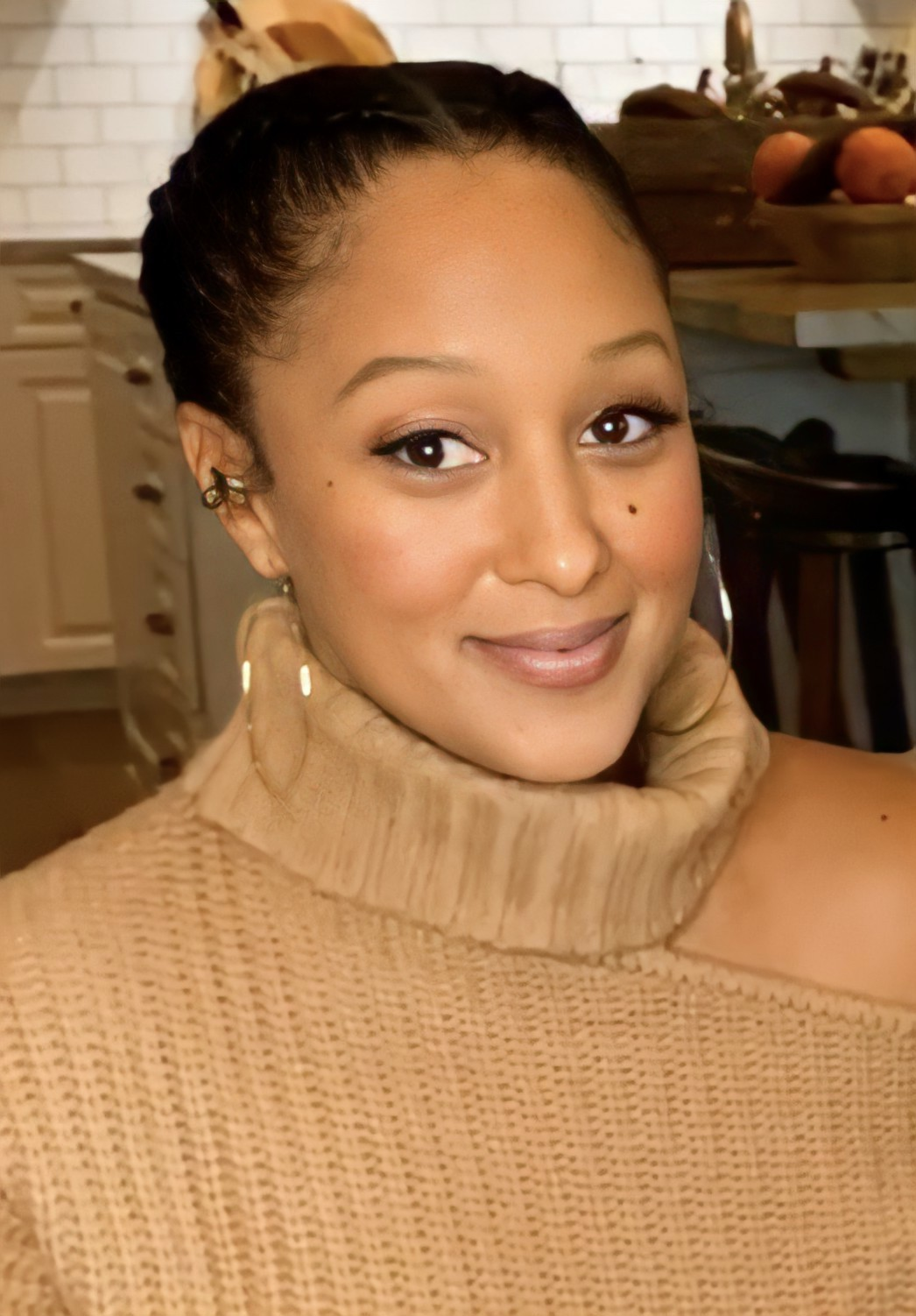
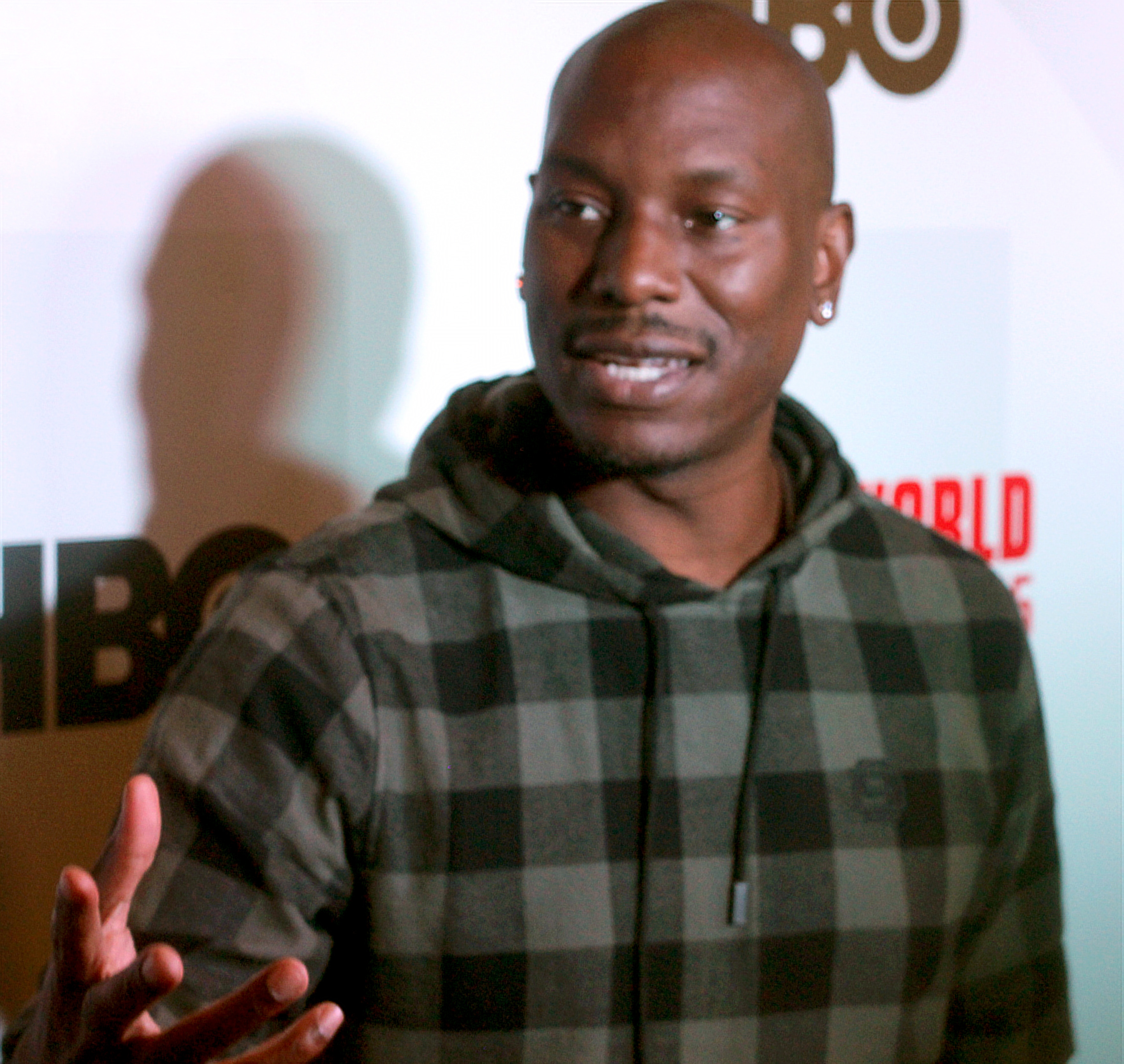
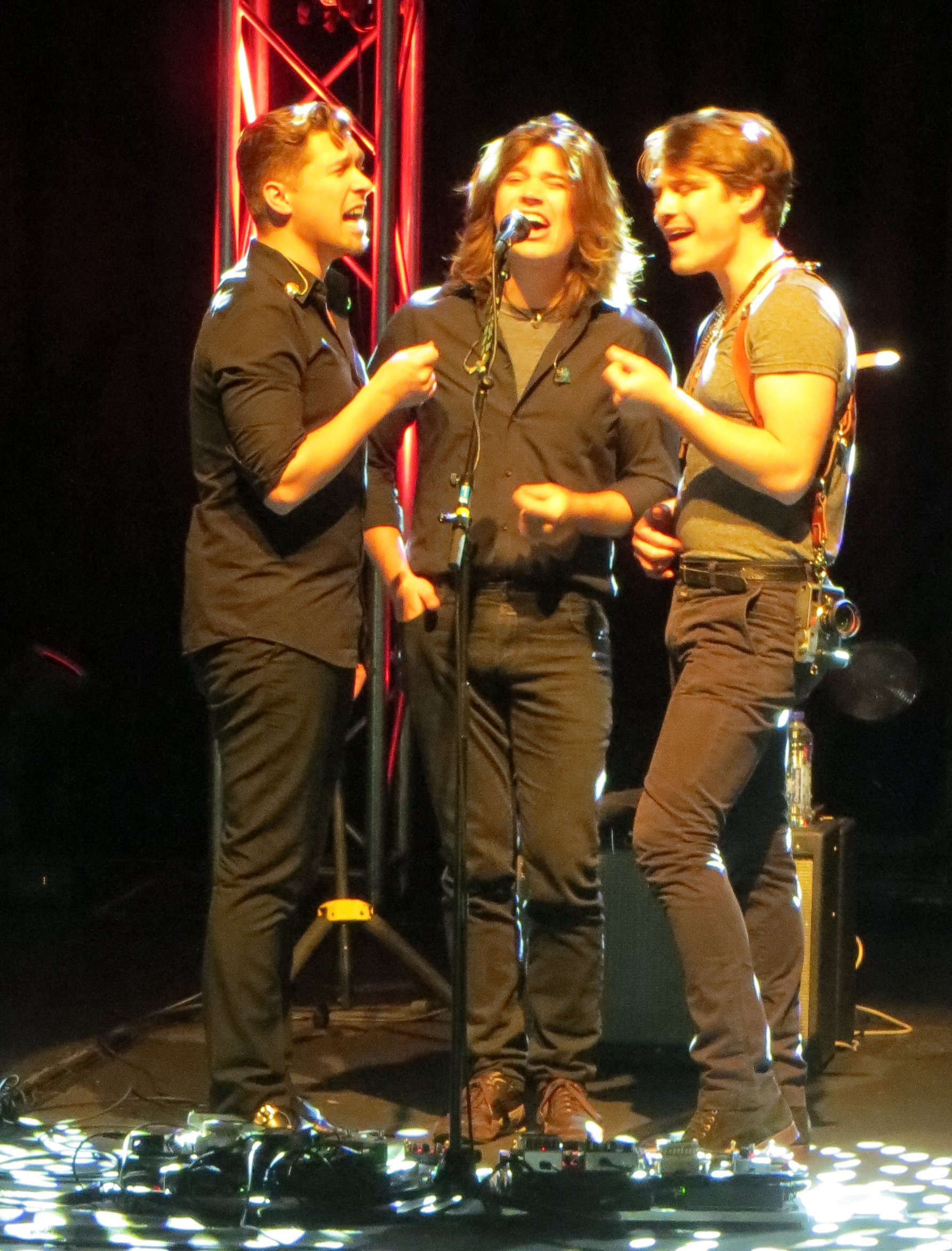
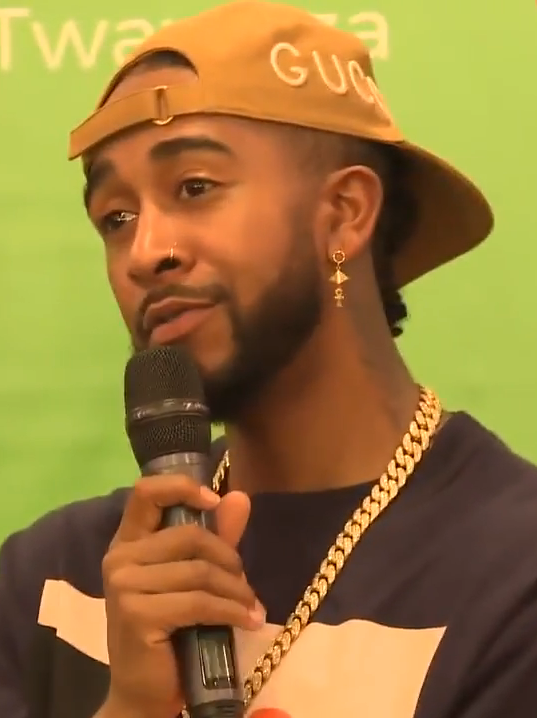
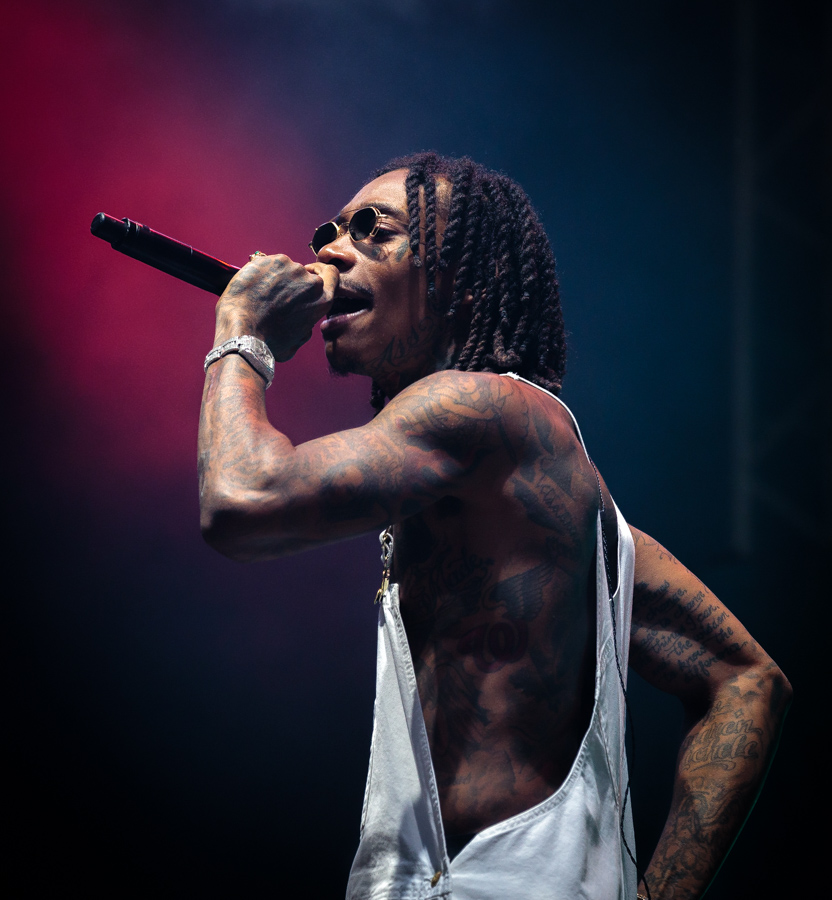
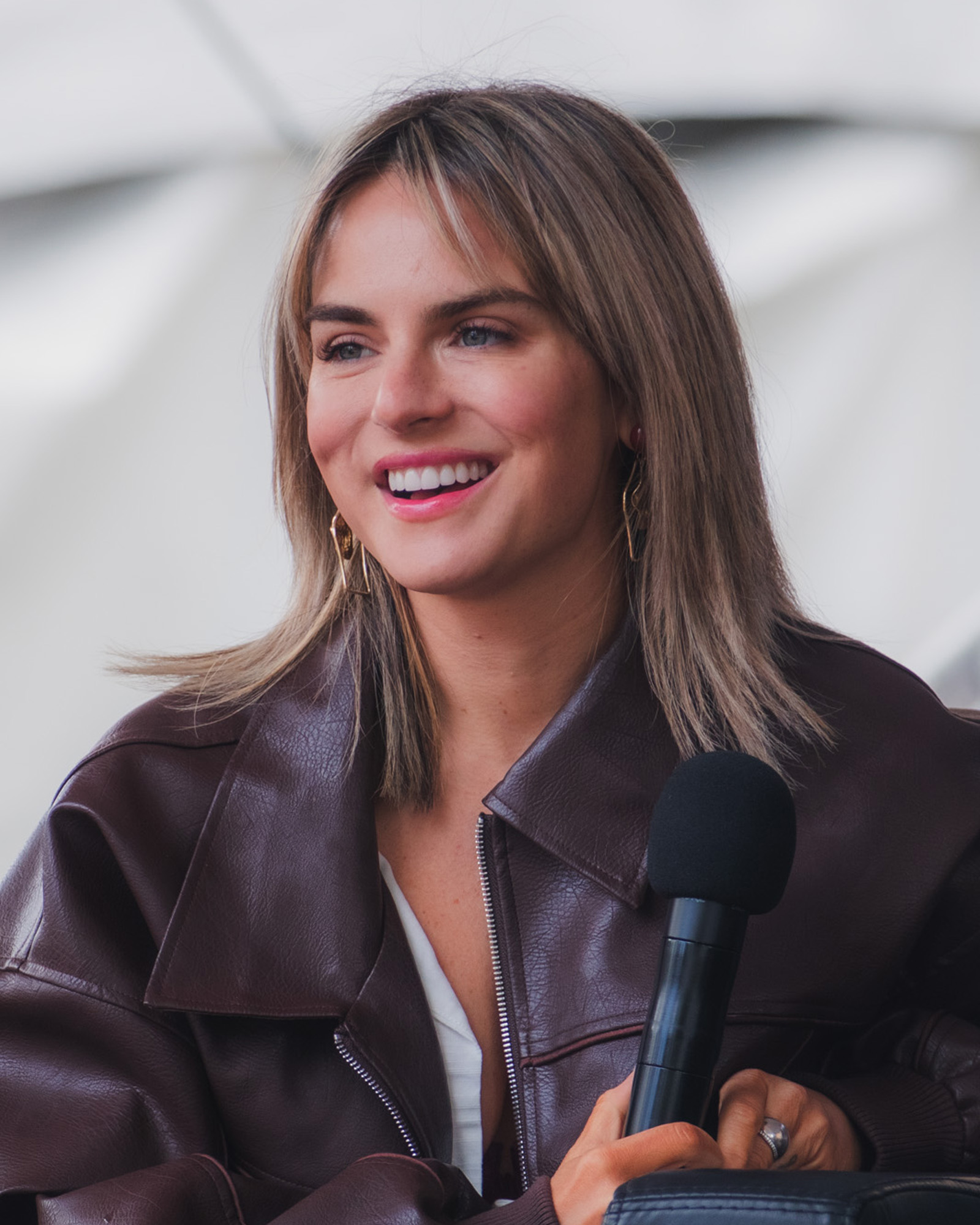
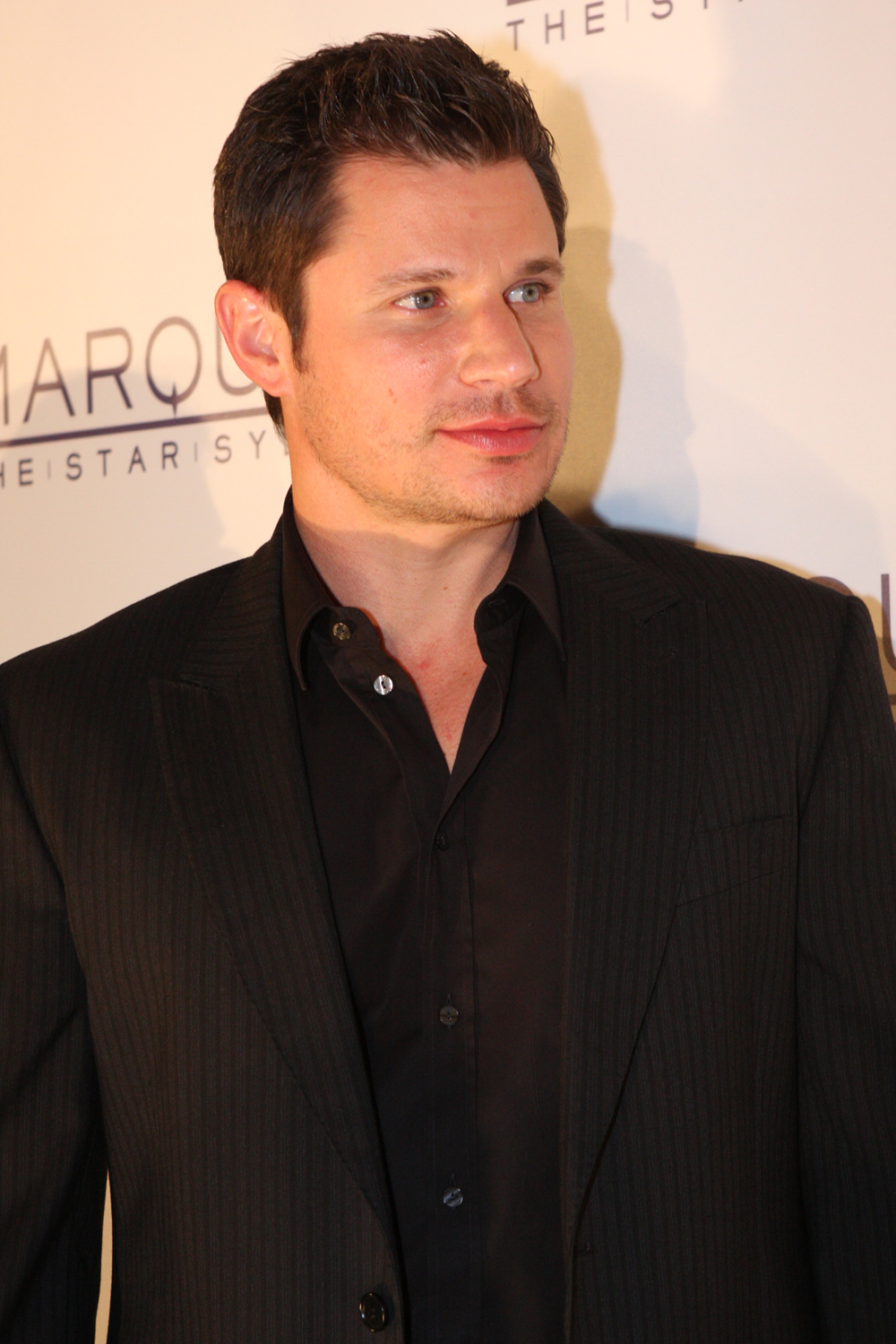
The celebrities who competed in the fifth season of The Masked Singer, pictured in order of elimination (L–R):

Caitlyn Jenner ("Phoenix"), Danny Trejo ("Raccoon"), Logan Paul ("Grandpa Monster"), Nick Cannon ("Bulldog"), Mark McGrath ("Orca"), Bobby Brown ("Crab"), Tamera Mowry-Housley ("Seashell"), Tyrese Gibson ("Robopine"), Hanson ("Russian Dolls"), Omarion ("Yeti"), Wiz Khalifa ("Chameleon"), JoJo ("Black Swan"), and Nick Lachey ("Piglet")

Not pictured: Kermit the Frog ("Snail")

== Episodes ==
=== Week 1 (March 10) ===
Performances on the first episode
#	Stage name	Song	Identity	Result
1	Russian Dolls	"Man in the Mirror" by Michael Jackson	undisclosed	SAFE
2	Snail	"You Make My Dreams (Come True)" by Hall & Oates	Kermit the Frog	OUT
3	Seashell	"Listen to Your Heart" by Roxette	undisclosed	SAFE
4	Raccoon	"Wild Thing" by The Troggs	undisclosed	SAFE
5	Robopine	"Never Too Much" by Luther Vandross	undisclosed	SAFE

=== Week 2 (March 17) ===
Performances on the second episode
#	Stage name	Song	Identity	Result
1	Black Swan	"Barracuda" by Heart	undisclosed	SAFE
2	Grandpa Monster	"Mambo No. 5 (A Little Bit Of...)" by Lou Bega	undisclosed	SAFE
3	Chameleon	"Ride wit Me" by Nelly	undisclosed	SAFE
4	Phoenix	"TiK ToK" by Kesha	Caitlyn Jenner	OUT
5	Piglet	"Speechless" by Dan + Shay	undisclosed	SAFE

=== Week 3 (March 24) ===
Performances on the third episode
#	Stage name	Song	Identity	Result
1	Russian Dolls	"Wonder" by Shawn Mendes	undisclosed	SAFE
2	Raccoon	"Ring of Fire" by Johnny Cash	Danny Trejo	OUT
3	Robopine	"All of Me" by John Legend	undisclosed	SAFE
4	Seashell	"Confident" by Demi Lovato	undisclosed	SAFE
Wild card	Orca	"We're Not Gonna Take It" by Twisted Sister	undisclosed	SAFE

=== Week 4 (March 31) ===
Performances on the fourth episode
#	Stage name	Song	Identity	Result
1	Grandpa Monster	"Bad Reputation" by Joan Jett	Logan Paul	OUT
2	Piglet	"Good to Be Alive (Hallelujah)" by Andy Grammer	undisclosed	SAFE
3	Black Swan	"In My Blood" by Shawn Mendes	undisclosed	SAFE
4	Chameleon	"21 Questions" by 50 Cent feat. Nate Dogg	undisclosed	SAFE
Wild card	Crab	"Ain't No Sunshine" by Bill Withers	undisclosed	SAFE

=== Week 5 (April 7) ===
Performances on the fifth episode
#	Stage name	Song	Identity	Result
1	Black Swan	"How Will I Know" by Whitney Houston	undisclosed	SAFE
2	Piglet	"7 Years" by Lukas Graham	undisclosed	SAFE
3	Crab	"Give It to Me Baby" by Rick James (Note: Following the performance, Crab's performer (Bobby Brown) had to be briefly taken to his dressing room when he became overheated and short of breath in the costume.)	undisclosed	SAFE
4	Chameleon	"Hip Hop" by Dead Prez	undisclosed	SAFE
Wild card	Bulldog	"Candy Girl" by New Edition	Nick Cannon	OUT

=== Week 6 (April 14) ===
Performances on the sixth episode
#	Stage name	Song	Identity	Result
1	Russian Dolls	"Want to Want Me" by Jason Derulo	undisclosed	SAFE
2	Robopine	"Killing Me Softly" by Roberta Flack	undisclosed	SAFE
3	Seashell	"Tell Me Something Good" by Rufus feat. Chaka Khan	undisclosed	SAFE
4	Orca	"Every Rose Has Its Thorn" by Poison	Mark McGrath	OUT
Wild card	Yeti	"If It Isn't Love" by New Edition	undisclosed	SAFE

=== Week 7 (April 21) ===
Performances on the seventh episode
#	Stage name	Song	Identity	Result
1	Piglet	"The Pretender" by Foo Fighters	undisclosed	SAFE
2	Robopine	"Let's Get It On" by Marvin Gaye	undisclosed	SAFE
3	Chameleon	"Regulate" by Warren G feat. Nate Dogg	undisclosed	SAFE
4	Yeti	"Lonely" by Justin Bieber and Benny Blanco	undisclosed	SAFE
5	Russian Dolls	"24K Magic" by Bruno Mars	undisclosed	SAFE
6	Crab	"In the Air Tonight" by Phil Collins	Bobby Brown	OUT
7	Seashell	"I Think We're Alone Now" by Tiffany	Tamera Mowry-Housley	OUT
8	Black Swan	"Use Somebody" by Kings of Leon	undisclosed	SAFE

=== Week 8 (May 5) ===
Performances on the eighth episode
#	Stage name	Song	Identity	Result
1	Yeti	"It Takes Two" by Rob Base and DJ E-Z Rock	undisclosed	SAFE
2	Robopine	"Water Runs Dry" by Boyz II Men	Tyrese Gibson	OUT
3	Piglet	"Against All Odds (Take a Look at Me Now)" by Phil Collins	undisclosed	SAFE
4	Black Swan	"Do I Do" by Stevie Wonder	undisclosed	SAFE
5	Russian Dolls	"Shallow" by Bradley Cooper and Lady Gaga	undisclosed	SAFE
6	Chameleon	"Put Your Hands Where My Eyes Could See" by Busta Rhymes	undisclosed	SAFE

=== Week 9 (May 12) ===
Performances on the ninth episode
#	Stage name	Song	Identity	Result
1	Russian Dolls	"I'm Still Standing" by Elton John	Hanson	OUT
2	Black Swan	"Thinking Out Loud" by Ed Sheeran	undisclosed	SAFE
3	Piglet	"Superstition" by Stevie Wonder	undisclosed	SAFE
4	Yeti	"Bless the Broken Road" by Rascal Flatts	undisclosed	SAFE
5	Chameleon	"Drop It Like It's Hot" by Snoop Dogg ft. Pharrell Williams	undisclosed	SAFE

=== Week 10 (May 19) ===
Performance by Cluedle-Doo (Donnie Walhberg): "Return of the Mack" by Mark Morrison

Performances on the tenth episode
#	Stage name	Song	Identity	Result
1	Yeti	"Celebration" by Kool & the Gang	Omarion	OUT
2	Black Swan	"Tequila" by Dan + Shay	undisclosed	SAFE
3	Chameleon	"Oh Boy" by Cam'ron feat. Juelz Santana	undisclosed	SAFE
4	Piglet	"Bruises" by Lewis Capaldi	undisclosed	SAFE

=== Week 11 (May 26) – Finale ===
Group performance: "How Do I Live" by LeAnn Rimes (Note: Rimes, who served as a guest panelist for the episode, also sang in this performance with the three finalists.)

Performances on the eleventh episode
#	Stage name	Song	Identity	Result
1	Chameleon	"Gangsta's Paradise" by Coolio feat. L.V.	Wiz Khalifa	THIRD PLACE
2	Black Swan	"How Am I Supposed to Live Without You" by Michael Bolton	JoJo	RUNNER-UP
3	Piglet	"Faithfully" by Journey	Nick Lachey	WINNER

== Ratings ==
Viewership and ratings per episode of The Masked Singer (American TV series) season 5
No.	Title	Air date	Rating/share (18–49)	Viewers (millions)	DVR (18–49)	DVR viewers (millions)	Total (18–49)	Total viewers (millions)	Ref.
1	"Season 5 Premiere - Return of the Masks"	March 10, 2021	1.3/9	5.66	0.7	2.33	2.1	7.99	
2	"Group B Premiere - Shamrock and Roll"	March 17, 2021	1.2/9	5.12	—N/a	—N/a	—N/a	—N/a	
3	"Group A Wildcard Round - Enter The Wildcards!"	March 24, 2021	1.2/8	5.20	—N/a	—N/a	—N/a	—N/a	
4	"Group B Wildcard Round - Rule of Claw!"	March 31, 2021	1.2/9	5.05	0.4	1.35	1.6	6.40	(Note: Live+7 DVR ratings were unavailable, so Live+3 DVR ratings are listed instead.)
5	"Group B Finals - The Ulti 'Mutt' Wildcard!"	April 7, 2021	1.1/8	4.79	0.6	1.81	1.7	6.60	
6	"Group A Finals - In the Nick of Time!"	April 14, 2021	1.2/8	5.17	0.5	1.75	1.8	6.92	
7	"Super 8 - The Plot Chickens!"	April 21, 2021	1.2/8	5.08	0.6	1.91	1.8	6.99	
Special	"The Sing-A-Long: The Maskie Awards"	April 28, 2021	0.8/6	3.62	0.2	0.79	1.0	4.41	
8	"The Spicy 6 - The Competition Heats Up!"	May 5, 2021	1.1/8	4.71	0.5	1.73	1.6	6.44	
9	"The Quarter Finals - Five Fan Favorites"	May 12, 2021	1.1/8	4.77	0.4	1.48	1.6	6.25	
10	"Semifinals"	May 19, 2021	1.2/8	5.23	0.5	1.71	1.8	6.95	
11	"Finale"	May 26, 2021	1.4/9	5.51	0.4	1.54	1.8	7.05	
