= Dr. Seuss Baking Challenge =

- Genre: Cooking competition
- Presented by: Tamera Mowry-Housley
- Country of origin: United States
- Original language: English
- No. of episodes: 8

Production
- Executive producers: Ruth Amsel; Susan Brandt; Adam Cohen; Cara Tapper; Joanna Vernetti
- Running time: 43–57 min.
- Production companies: Dr. Seuss Enterprises; Super Delicious; Amazon Studios

Original release
- Network: Amazon Prime Video; Amazon Freevee
- Release: December 13, 2022

Dr. Seuss Baking Challenge is an American cooking competition television series hosted by Tamera Mowry-Housley. It premiered on Amazon Prime Video and Amazon Freevee on December 13, 2022.

== Summary ==
Competing in teams of two, bakers and cake artists take on a series of culinary challenges inspired by iconic Dr. Seuss stories, such as The Cat in the Hat, How the Grinch Stole Christmas, and Horton Hears a Who!. Their creations are judged by pastry chefs Clarice Lam and Joshua John Russell, based on taste, creativity, and storytelling.

The first three episodes acted as qualifiers with three teams going head to head to win spots in the next round. After that the show changes to a typical format with all teams competing in every challenge and one team being eliminated every episode. Ultimately in the finale the two remaining teams competed for the $50,000 prize.

== Contestants ==
Team	Bakers		Eliminated
Green Team	Cristina Vazquez	Kerrie Breuer	Winners
Teal Team	Rebecca Reed	Ashley Ball	Runner-up
Brown Team	Angel Figueroa	Maya Hayes	Eliminated in Episode 7
Purple Team	Nikki Jessop	Alejandra Galan	Eliminated in Episode 6
Blue Team	Kyle Smothers	Huiwen Lu	Eliminated in Episode 5
Yellow Team	Lorenzo Delgado	Tareka Lofton	Eliminated in Episode 4
Orange Team	Chris Cwierz	Alene Paulk	Withdrew
Pink Team	Daniel Santo Edwards	Joyce Osorio	Eliminated in Episode 3
Red Team	Angelo Satterwhite	Lily Sanchez	Eliminated in Episode 1

== Production ==
On March 17, 2022, it was announced that a Dr. Seuss-themed baking competition series was in development at Amazon Studios, and would also be produced by Dr. Seuss Enterprises and Super Delicious. This would be the first unscripted series based on the work of Dr. Seuss. On August 16, 2022, it was announced that the series had been greenlit by Amazon, with Tamera Mowry-Housley as host, and Clarice Lam and Joshua John Russell as judges. Ruth Amsel is showrunner and executive producer, and Cara Tapper, Adam Cohen, Joanna Vernetti, and Susan Brandt are also executive producers.

== Contestant Progress ==
Episode	1	2	3	4	5	6^{2}	7	8
Theme	The Cat in the Hat	Oh the Places; You'll Go	Green; Eggs and Ham	How the Grinch; Stole; Christmas	The Shape of Me and Other Stuff	The Lorax	Fox in Socks	Horton; Hears a Who!
Theme	The Cat in the Hat	Oh the Places; You'll Go	Green; Eggs and Ham	How the Grinch; Stole; Christmas	Yertle the Turtle	The Lorax	If I Ran the Circus	Horton; Hears a Who!
Team	Elimination Challenge Results							
**Cristina & Kerrie**			WIN	BTM2	**SAFE**	**WIN**	**SAFE**	WINNER
**Rebecca & Ashley**		WIN		SAFE	BTM2	WIN^{3}	WIN	RUNNER-UP
**Angel & Maya**	**WIN**			**SAFE**	WIN	BTM2	OUT	
**Nikki & Alejandra**		**OUT**		WIN^{1}	SAFE	OUT		
**Kyle & Huiwen**	SAFE			SAFE	OUT			
**Lorenzo & Tareka**		SAFE		OUT				
**Chris & Alene**			**SAFE**	WD^{1}				
**Daniel & Joyce**			OUT					
**Angelo & Lily**	OUT							

^Note 1: In episode 4, it was announced that the Orange Team, Chris & Alene, had withdrawn from the competition. As a result the judges were allowed to bring one team back into the game, and they selected the Purple Team, Nikki & Alejandra.
^Note 2: From episode 6 on the team that won the first round no longer received an advantage in the elimination challenge.
^Note 3: The Green Team, Cristina & Kerrie, were declared the Best Bite of the day, however the Teal team, Rebecca & Ashley, also received pins and had their recipe added to Amazon as well.

(WIN) This team won the elimination challenge and had their recipe shared on Amazon.
(SAFE) This team was declared safe from elimination.
(BTM) This team was in the bottom two.
(OUT) This team was eliminated from the competition.
(WD) This team withdrew from the competition.

Bold denotes the team that won the first challenge and received an advantage in the elimination challenge.

== Release ==
The trailer for the series was released on November 16, 2022. All eight episodes of the series premiered on Amazon Freevee and Prime Video on December 13, 2022.
