= Clarice Lam =

Canadian pastry chef

Clarice Lam is a Canadian pastry chef and cookbook author.

== Early life ==
Lam was born in Toronto, Ontario, Canada and raised in Los Angeles, California by her parents who immigrated from Hong Kong. Initially, Lam desired to become a model. During her career in modeling, she was able to travel to many different countries. It was during her time in Paris that she developed an appreciation for French pastry. She took courses at Le Cordon Bleu while living in Italy. Lam was diagonosed with scoliosis at a young age.

== Career ==
Lam graduated from The French Culinary Institute and graduated with a Grand Diplôme in Classic Pastry Arts. Lam began her career while working at Bouchon Bakery and Spice Market. She later served as the executive chef at The Chocolate Room in Brooklyn. In 2012, she founded The Baking Bean, a bakery specializing in deserts. In 2020, Lam joined Kimika, an Italian-Japanese restaurant in Nolita, as the opening pastry chef. In 2022, Lam was announced as a Judge on Dr. Seuss Baking Challenge. Also in 2022, Kimika was a semifinalist for Best New Restaurant by the James Beard Foundation Award. Lam released her cookbook, Breaking Bao: 88 Bakes and Snacks from Asia and Beyond, which was nominated for the James Beard Foundation Award in 2025. Also, in 2025, Lam joined Kaya as the executive pastry chef.
