= Adam Housley =

American journalist and baseball player (born 1971)

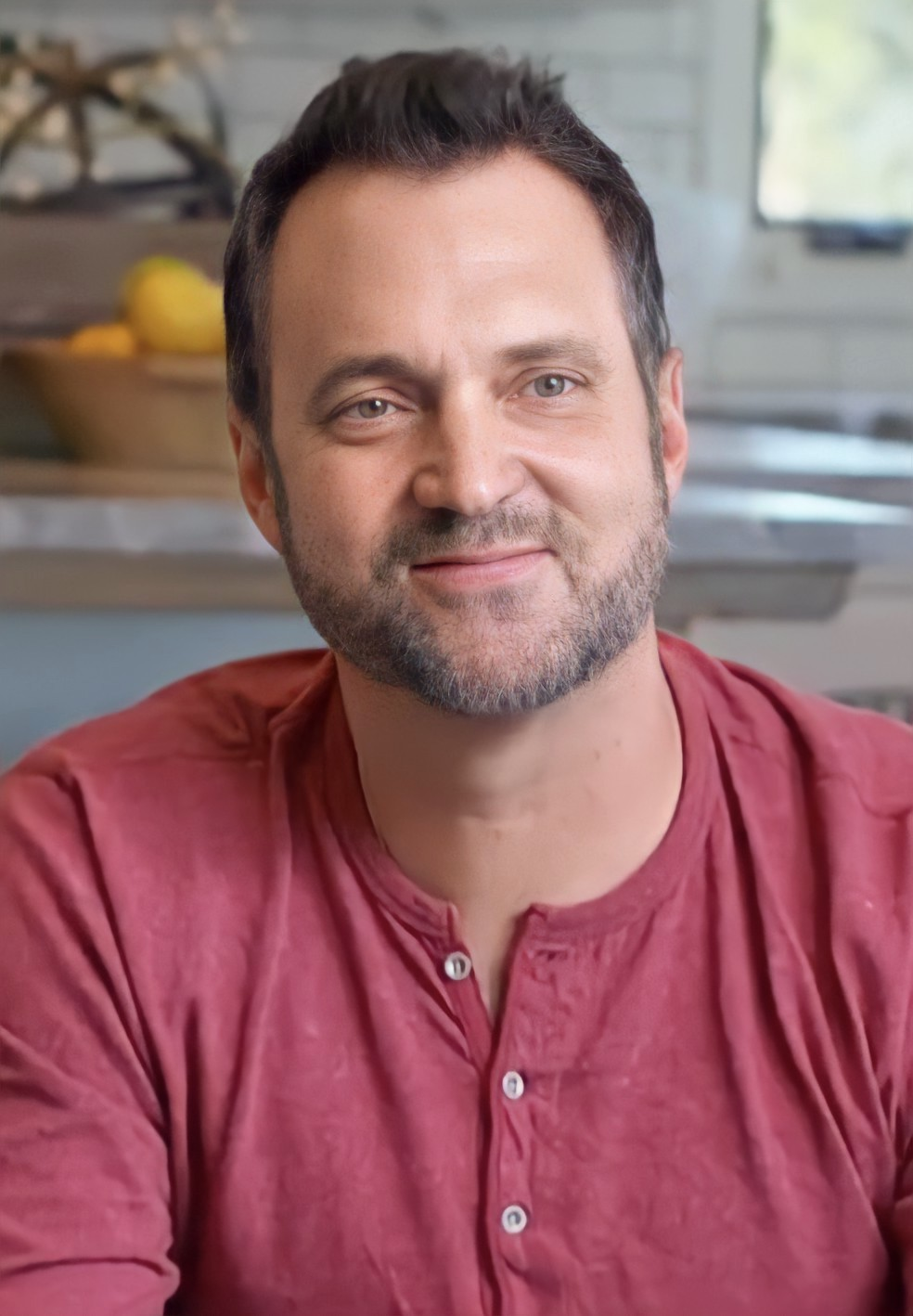
- Housley in 2019
- Born: Arthur Adam Housley; August 13, 1971 (age 55); Napa, California, U.S.
- Education: Vintage High School; Pepperdine University; University of Arizona
- Occupations: Vintner former television Senior news correspondent
- Spouse: Tamera Mowry (m. 2011)
- Children: 2
- Website: adamhousley.tv

Arthur Adam Housley (born August 13, 1971) is an Emmy Award-winning American journalist, winemaker, and former professional baseball player. He worked for Fox News from 2001 until 2018.

== Professional career ==
=== Baseball ===
A graduate of Pepperdine University, Housley played on the 1992 National Champion College World Series baseball team, and in 1992 and 1993 played collegiate summer baseball with the Harwich Mariners of the Cape Cod Baseball League. He was also a Junior Olympic All-American baseball player as a pitcher and hitter. He received a double bachelor's degree in political science and telecommunications from Pepperdine University. He was a two-time media fellow at the Hoover Institution at Stanford University, and received his MA in International Security Studies from the University of Arizona. Prior to his career in television, Housley played professional baseball. He was drafted by the Montreal Expos, and played for both the Milwaukee Brewers and the Detroit Tigers minor league organizations, pitching in 97 games.

=== Journalism ===
Prior to joining Fox News, Housley served as a reporter at KTXL-TV (Fox) in Sacramento, California from 1999 to 2001. He received an array of awards, including the 2001 Regional Associated Press Reporting Award and a Regional Emmy Award. In addition, he was the lead reporter for KFTY-TV from 1998 to 2000, an independent station in Santa Rosa, California. Prior to that, Housley was a reporter for KCPM-TV (NBC) in Chico, California from 1997 to 1998, where he won a California Department of Forestry and Fire Protection Award for capturing a wanted 50,000-acre arsonist. Housley began his career as a reporter for KVON and KVYN radio stations in his native Napa, where he developed and produced newscasts.

Housley reported during the Iraq War from Kuwait, Iraq, Bahrain, Jordan and the Persian Gulf. He has spent time covering the war on terror from Pakistan and in Israel, the West Bank and Gaza Strip. He was on air in Kuwait when the first missiles and warning sirens began on March 20, 2003, and earlier that month boarded ships in the Persian Gulf along with U.S. Special Forces as they looked for illegal shipments of weapons into Iraq. His reports also came via video phone from the deck of USS Milius a destroyer that would eventually fire the first missiles into Iraq to begin the war.

During his tenure, Housley was also the Fox News lead reporter for Arnold Schwarzenegger's 2003 campaign and has covered six hurricanes, including Katrina and Rita, and filed more than 45 stories from Mexico–United States border.

In December 2005, Housley was one of the reporters selected to witness the execution of murderer Stanley Williams at San Quentin State Prison.

Housley also reported live on the shooting at the Los Angeles International Airport, the suspension of New York Yankees third baseman Alex Rodriguez, and the aftermath of the crash of Asiana Airlines Flight 214 live from the San Francisco Airport. Previously, he covered the 2012 Waldo Canyon Fire, Colorado In April 2013, he secured an exclusive interview with a special operations whistleblower regarding the 2012 Benghazi attack on September 11.

Housley has covered stories in six Latin American countries: Nicaragua, Venezuela, El Salvador, Colombia, Mexico, and Chile (reporting on the "war on drugs" and interviewing the Sandinista National Liberation Front leader Daniel Ortega). He has also covered stories in Guyana. He was live on air when Venezuelan President Hugo Chávez shut down Latin American broadcaster RCTV, and spent two weeks covering the unrest.

He received a master's degree in international security from the University of Arizona in 2014.

==== Notable coverage ====
Housley was one of the first correspondents on assignment in Haiti, covering the devastation left in the wake of the 2010 Haiti earthquake that struck it on January 12, 2010. He wound up using a plug-in mic he found at the Consumer Electronics Show the week earlier to record reports shot on his iPhone. Housley and his cameraman, Eric Barnes, were able to turn rescue footage shot by Congressman Kendrick Meek (D-FL) into broadcast news.

Housley was one of the first Western journalists to provide extensive onsite coverage in the wake of the 2004 Indian Ocean earthquake and tsunami. He reported on recovery efforts and the search for bodies along with his crew on location from Phuket, Patong Beach, Phi Phi Islands and Khao Lak.

Housley who is fluent in Spanish, covered the 2010 Copiapó mining accident in northern Chile for Fox News. He was on site and reporting on October 12–13, 2010, as each of the 33 miners, trapped for 69 days, was brought to the surface one at a time in a rescue capsule.

Housley was one of the first American reporters on scene in Japan to cover the devastation following the 2011 Tōhoku earthquake and tsunami. He and his crew at one point got within 70 miles of the Fukushima Daini Nuclear Power Plant, filming live streaming reports for Fox News before the nuclear threat forced them to return to Tokyo. Among others, his coverage was featured in the Los Angeles Times, Mecklermedia and The Napa Valley Register.

During the protests in August and November 2014 following the death of Michael Brown, Housley was one of the Fox News reporters on the scene in Ferguson, Missouri. He reported live as the fires were still burning on Florissant Avenue, and he used twitter to help prompt viewers to donate money to local businesses whose property was damaged during the protests and subsequent fires.

Housley was one of the first reporters on site for the December 2015 San Bernardino attack in San Bernardino. He and his crew obtained exclusive video of the shootout that ended with the gunmen, Rizwan Farook and Tashfeen Malik, being shot and killed by police. He also broke a number of major developments in the case, including the plan to charge an accomplice, Enrique Marquez Jr., with terror-related offenses, federal investigators looking for a missing hard drive, the FBI knew of terror connections early on, and Farook and Malik practiced at a local gun range.

On August 23, 2018, Politico reported that Housley was leaving Fox News, due to his frustration with hard-news reporting being de-emphasized in favor of commentary regarding President Donald Trump.

=== Business owner ===
After a career in baseball and news, Housley helped to found Century Oak, his family's winery, in 2000. Housley's family had been involved in the wine grape growing business since 1969. The winery opened a tasting room in Napa named Housley Napa Valley in 2020. Housely and his wife, Tamera, established a Coffeehouse named Barnhouse Napa Brews on the same block in Napa in 2021.

== Personal life ==
=== Family ===
Housley married American actress Tamera Mowry on May 15, 2011 on a vineyard in Napa, California. Mowry wore a wedding gown designed by Carolina Herrera and twin sister, actress Tia Mowry, served as the maid of honor. The event was attended by approximately 300 guests. They have two children together: a son named Aden John Tanner Housley (b. 2012) and a daughter named Ariah Talea Housley (b. 2015).

==== TV Appearances with Tamera Mowry-Housley ====
In 2016, Housley appeared on Celebrity Cupcake Wars and as his wife's teammate. They competed against AJ Michalka, Maria Menounos, and Greer Grammer. Their recipe won and was featured at a celebration for astronaut Scott Kelly and their. In honor of their win, the show donated $10,000 to their chosen charity, the Gary Sinise Foundation Snowball Express, which serves children of fallen American soldiers.

In 2021, Housley and his wife competed on Celebrity Game Face, a celebrity game show hosted by Kevin Hart. They donated their winnings to the Alaina's Voice Foundation, a charitable organization founded by Housley's brother and sister-in-law Arik and Hannah, whose daughter Alaina Housley was a victim of the Thousand Oaks shooting.

=== Thousand Oaks Shooting ===
Housley's niece, Alaina Housley, was killed during the Thousand Oaks shooting on November 7, 2018.
