= Tamera Mowry =

American actress, singer, TV host (born 1978)

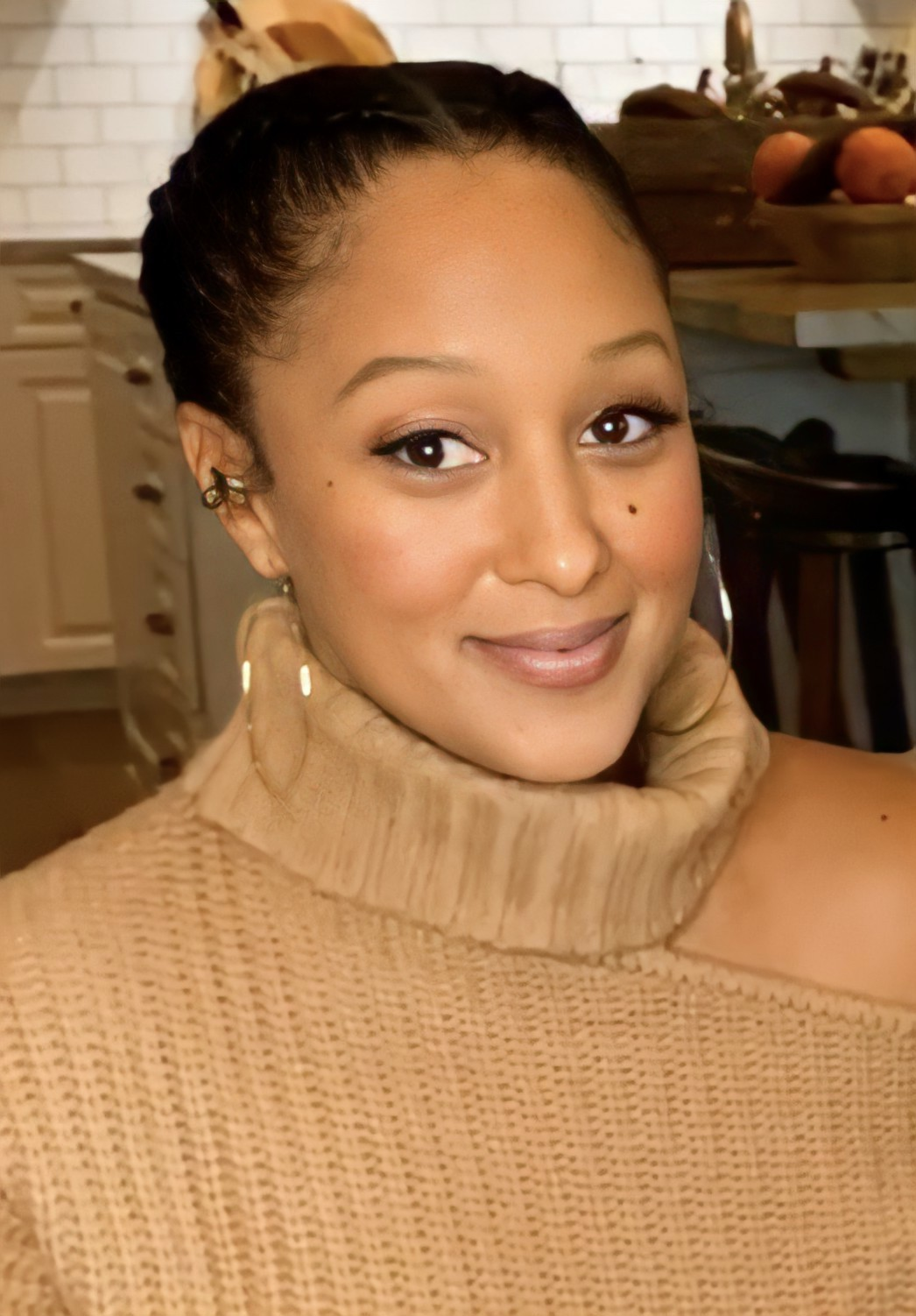
- Mowry in 2020
- Born: Tamera Darvette Mowry; July 6, 1978 (age 48); Gelnhausen, West Germany
- Other name: Tamera Mowry-Housley
- Education: Pepperdine University (BS)
- Occupations: Actress; television personality; singer
- Years active: 1990–present
- Television: Sister, Sister Tia & Tamera The Real Home & Family
- Spouse: Adam Housley (m. 2011)
- Children: 2
- Relatives: Tia Mowry (twin sister); Tahj Mowry (brother))
- Website: www.tameramowry.com

Tamera Darvette Mowry-Housley (née Mowry) (/təˈmɛərə ˈmɔːri/) (born July 6, 1978) is an American actress, television personality, and former singer. She first gained fame for her teen role as Tamera Campbell on the ABC/WB sitcom Sister, Sister (opposite her twin sister Tia Mowry). She has also starred in the Disney Channel Original Movie Twitches and its sequel, Twitches Too, and played Dr. Kayla Thornton on the medical drama Strong Medicine.

She next starred in a reality television series following her and her twin sister's lives, titled Tia & Tamera, which began airing on the Style Network in 2011 and ended in 2013 after three seasons. From 2013 to 2020, Mowry was one of the co-hosts of the syndicated daytime talk show The Real, for which she also won a Daytime Emmy Award for Outstanding Entertainment Talk Show Host in 2018 alongside then cohosts Adrienne Bailon, Loni Love and Jeannie Mai.

== Early life ==
Tamera Darvette Mowry was born in Gelnhausen in then-West Germany on July 6, 1978, to Darlene Renee Mowry (née Flowers), who later became her children's manager, and Timothy John Mowry, who became a custody officer/jailer with the City of Glendale Police Department when the family moved to California. She also has a twin sister, Tia Mowry and two younger brothers: actor Tahj Mowry and musician Tavior Mowry.

Her father has British and Irish ancestry and her mother is of Afro-Bahamian descent. Mowry's parents met in high school, in Miami, Florida, both joining the U.S. Army and eventually reaching the rank of sergeant. Mowry has described her family as being both "close-knit" and "deeply religious," noting that the sisters became born-again Christians when they were eight years old.

== Career ==
=== Music ===
Mowry and her twin sister, Tia, joined an R&B singing group in the early 1990s called Voices. The group debuted their first single, "Yeah, Yeah, Yeah!", in 1992 and it charted at No. 72 on the Billboard Hot 100. Mowry's mom Darlene removed the twins from the group after a disagreement with management prior to the release of their debut album.

In 2012, Mowry provided guest vocals on Jerome Wiggins' single "I Will", which was released that December.

=== Television ===
At the age of 12, the twins convinced their mother to move to California with them so they could pursue acting. She agreed, on the condition that they land an acting job within the first month of their stay. In 1990, their family moved to California permanently, settling in Los Angeles, and she and her sister began appearing in commercials and small roles. Mowry and her twin sister, Tia, co-starred as the main characters in Sister, Sister, a television show that aired from 1994 through 1999. Starring the two girls, Mowry played Tamera Campbell, who was adopted and separated from birth away from her twin sister. The show kickstarts from where the twins meet coincidentally in the mall. The comedy TV show shows the two sisters combining worlds with their adopted parents combining households. Tia is intelligent and from inner-city Detroit while Tamera is the boy-crazy twin from the suburbs.

In 2005, Mowry starred alongside her sister in the Disney Channel film Twitches. In 2013, Mowry became a co-host of the syndicated daytime talk show The Real alongside Adrienne Bailon, Tamar Braxton, Loni Love, Jeannie Mai. After premiering on July 15, The Real was picked up to series the following year. In 2018, Mowry and her co-hosts won the Daytime Emmy Award for Outstanding Entertainment Talk Show Host for their work. In July 2020, Mowry announced that after six seasons she would be leaving The Real. She returned to the show as a guest on December 8, 2020. That same day, Mowry joined Home & Family as a new family member on the show, succeeding Paige Hemmis.

In 2021, Mowry competed in season 5 of The Masked Singer as "Seashell". She was eliminated on Week 7 alongside Bobby Brown as "Crab". This show also revived Mowry being a singer.

In the same year, it was announced that Mowry and former White House Executive Pastry Chef Bill Yosses would be hosting Baker's Dozen, a baking competition show for Hulu.

Throughout 2021–2024, Mowry has starred in various holiday and non-holiday Hallmark movies such as, The Santa Stakeout, Girlfriendship, Inventing the Christmas Prince, and Hallmark Mystery's Haunted Harmony Mysteries: Murder in G Major.

=== Other ventures ===
Mowry and her twin sister, Tia, started a project called Need Brand as they entered motherhood. Milky! and Stretchy! are two of the products that can cater to motherhood. Milky! is a 2.5 oz. bottle with all organic ingredients that can help mothers produce milk. Stretchy! is a stretch mark cream for post-operation scars. Another sibling project of theirs was a four-book series called Twintuition: Double Vision and Twintuition: Double Trouble. She signed an overall deal with Crown Media in 2020.

== Personal life ==
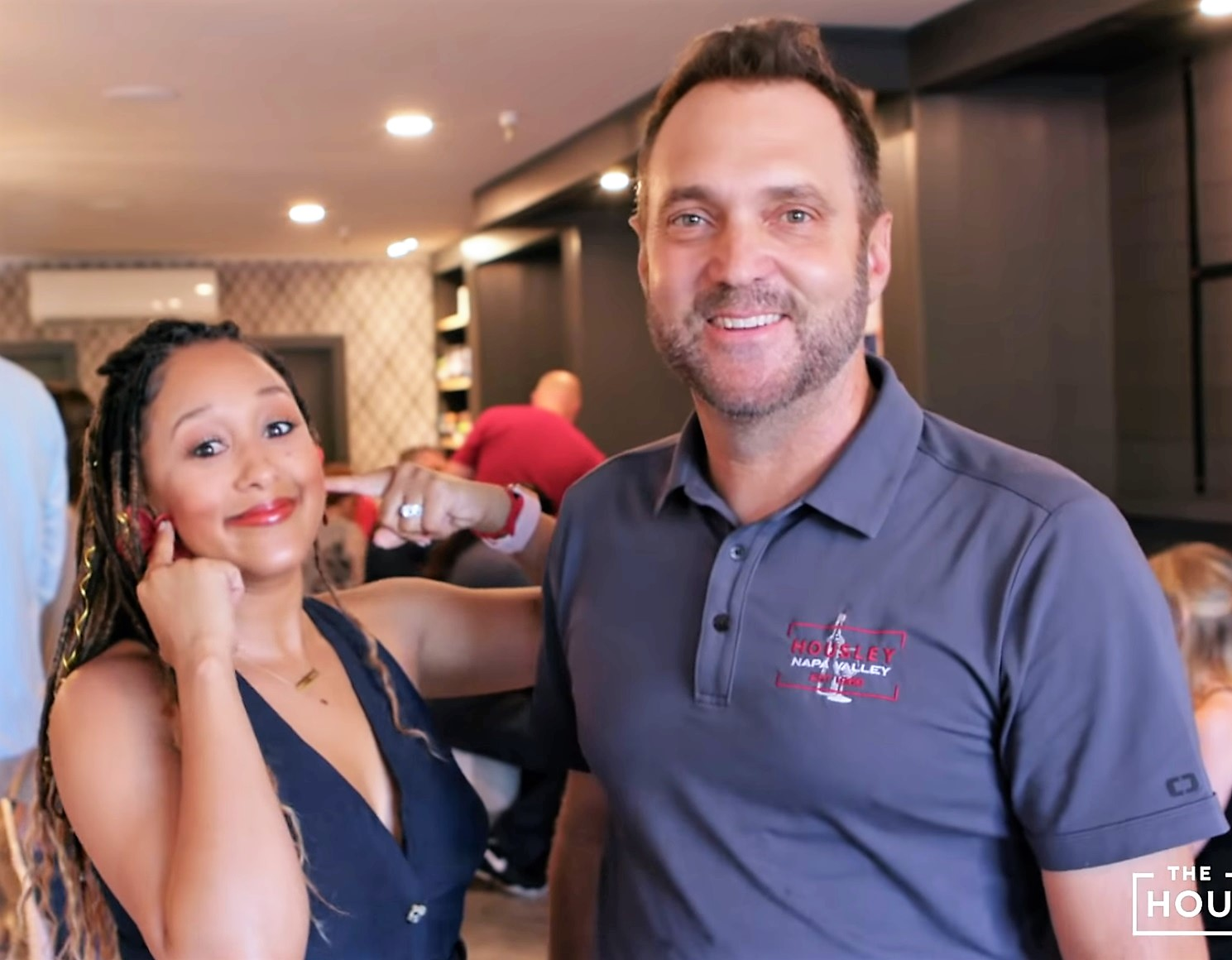
Mowry and Adam Housley at their tasting room in 2019

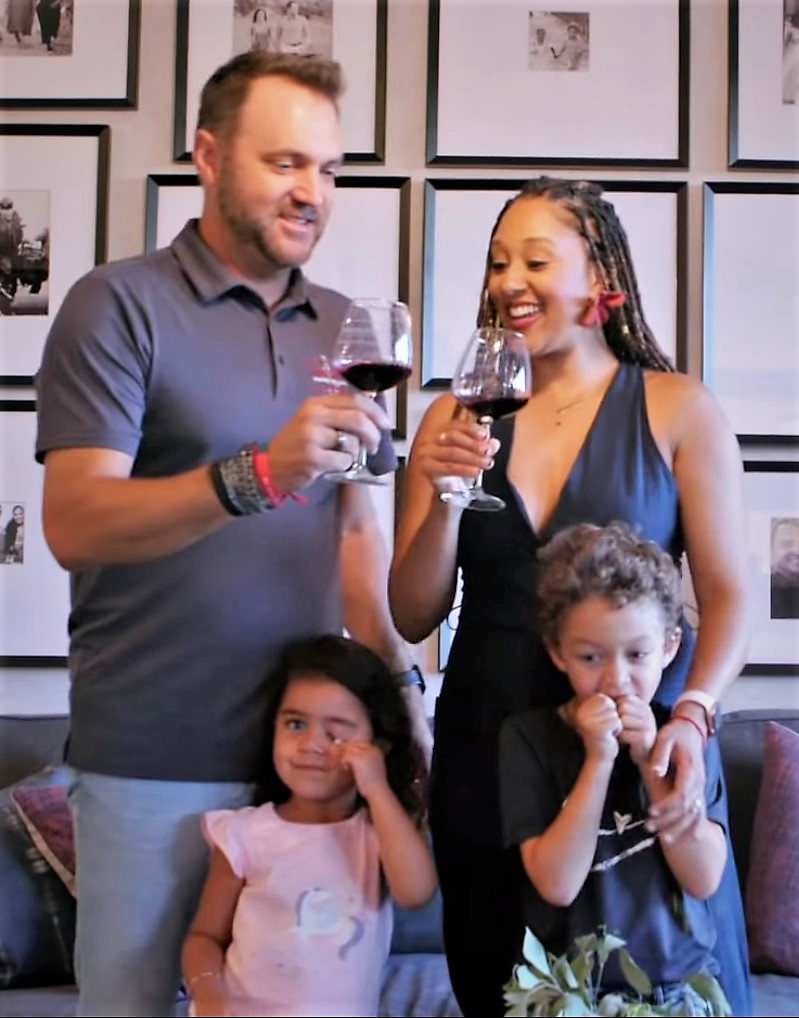
Housley, Mowry, and their children, at their tasting room in 2019

On May 15, 2011, after almost six years of dating, she married Fox News correspondent Adam Housley, in California's Napa Valley. Their first child, son Aden, was born on November 12, 2012. Their second child, daughter Ariah, was born on July 1, 2015. The couple owns a home in Napa Valley, near his family's vineyard.

The couple's niece Alaina Maria Housley was among the victims of the mass shooting at the Borderline Bar and Grill in Thousand Oaks, California, on November 7, 2018.

According to the April 22, 2025, episode of Finding Your Roots, William Brewster, a passenger on the Mayflower who became the senior elder of the Plymouth Colony, is the 13th great-grandfather of Mowry.

== Filmography ==
=== Film ===
Year	Title	Role	Notes
2002	The Hot Chick	Sissy	
2005	Hollywood Horror	Allison	
2012	Redemption of a Dog	Michelle	

=== Television ===
Year	Title	Role	Notes
1990	Rosie	Tamera Tanner	Episode: "Adventures in Blondiesitting"
1991	Flesh 'n' Blood	Penelope	Episode: "Beauty Is in the Eye of the Ticketholder"
1992	True Colors	Lorae	Episode: "In a Flash"
1992	Full House	Denise	Episode: "The Devil Made Me Do It"
1994–1999	Sister, Sister	Tamera Campbell	Main role
1995	The All New Mickey Mouse Club	Tamera Mowry	Season 7, Episode 10(; Cameo)
1996	Are You Afraid of the Dark?	Evil Chameleon	Episode: "The Tale of the Chameleons"
1995–1996	The Adventures of Hyperman	Emma C. Squared	Voice, main role
1996	The Jamie Foxx Show	Tamera Campbell	Episode: "The Bad Seed"
1997	Smart Guy	Roxanne	Episode: "Brother, Brother"
1999–2000	Detention	Orangejella LaBelle	Voice, main role
2000	Something to Sing About	Lily	TV film
2000	Seventeen Again	Young Catherine "Cat" Donovan	TV film
2001–2005	Express Yourself	Herself	Interstitial series
2004–2006	Strong Medicine	Dr. Kayla Thornton	Main role
2005	Twitches	Camryn Elizabeth Barnes / Apolla DuBaer	TV film
2006–2007	Family Guy	Esther	Voice, 3 episodes
2007	Twitches Too	Camryn Elizabeth Barnes / Apolla DuBaer	TV film
2009	Roommates	Hope Daniels	Main role
2009	The Super Hero Squad Show	Misty Knight	Voice, episode: "A Brat Walks Among Us!"
2010	Double Wedding	Danielle Warren	TV film
2011	Things We Do for Love	Lourdes	Main role
2011–2013	Tia & Tamera	Herself	Main role
2012	Rebounding	Vanessa	TV film
2012	Christmas Angel	Daphney Conroy	TV film
2013–2020	The Real	Herself	Talk show; co-host & producer (seasons 1-6)
2014–2015	Melissa & Joey	Gillian	3 episodes
2016	Talking Dead	Herself	Talk show
2017	Hollywood Darlings	Herself	Episode "Driving Miss Jodie"
2017	Daytime Divas	Herself	
2018	Help Us Get Married	Host	Facebook Watch Series
2019	A Christmas Miracle	Emma	TV film
2020	Christmas Comes Twice	Cheryl Jenkins	TV film
2020–2021	Home & Family	Herself	Talk show; Family Member, Lifestyle Expert
2021	Baker’s Dozen	Herself	Cooking show; host, judge
2021	Table Wars	Herself	Judge, Host
2021	The Masked Singer	Seashell	Contestant; unmasked in the Super 8
2021	The Santa Stakeout	Tanya Morris	TV film
2022	Girlfriendship	Samara	TV film
2022	Inventing the Christmas Prince	Shelby	TV film
2022	Dr. Seuss Baking Challenge	Herself	Cooking show; host
2023	Dream Moms	Danielle	TV film
2023	Haunted Harmony Mysteries: Murder in G Major	Gethsemane Brown	TV film
2024	Scouting for Christmas	Angela	TV film
2025	Haunted Harmony Mysteries: Buried at C	Gethsemane Brown	TV film
2025	Tidings for the Season	Lucy	TV film
2026	R.J. Decker	Louise Vernon	Episode: "In Vanity Veritas"
2026	All's Fair in Love and Mahjong	Carly	TV film
2026	Haunted Harmony Mysteries: Key to the Castle	Gethsemane Brown	TV film
2026	Haunted Harmony Mysteries: Prelude to a Wedding	Gethsemane Brown	TV film
2026	Scrubs (2026)	Dr. Steffie	Episode: "My Mentee"
2026	Mistletoe and Mimosas	Clare	

=== Music videos ===
Year	Title	Artist	Notes
1999	"I Really Like It"	Harlem World featuring Mase and Kelly Price	Guest appearance

== Awards and nominations ==
=== Daytime Emmy Award ===
Year	Award	Nominated work	Result
2016	Outstanding Entertainment Talk Show Host (shared with Tamar Braxton, Adrienne Houghton, Loni Love, and Jeannie Mai)	The Real	Nominated
2017	Outstanding Entertainment Talk Show Host (shared with Tamar Braxton, Adrienne Houghton, Loni Love, and Jeannie Mai)	The Real	Nominated
2018	Outstanding Entertainment Talk Show Host (shared with Houghton, Love, and Mai)	The Real	Won
2019	Outstanding Entertainment Talk Show Host (shared with Houghton, Love, and Mai)	The Real	Nominated

=== NAACP Image Award ===
Year	Award	Nominated work	Result
1996	Outstanding Youth Actor/Actress (shared with Tia Mowry)	Sister, Sister	Nominated
1999	Outstanding Actress in a Comedy Series (shared with Tia Mowry)	Sister, Sister	Won
2000	Outstanding Actress in a Comedy Series (shared with Tia Mowry)	Sister, Sister	Won
2011	Outstanding Actress Actress in a Television Movie, Miniseries or Dramatic Special	Double Wedding	Nominated
2013	Outstanding Reality Series	Tia & Tamera	Nominated
2018	Outstanding Talk Series (shared with Houghton, Love, and Mai)	The Real	Won
2019	Outstanding Talk Series (shared with Houghton, Love, and Mai)	The Real	Won

=== Nickelodeon Kids' Choice Award ===
Year	Award	Nominated work	Result
1995	Favorite TV Actress (shared with Tia Mowry)	Sister, Sister	Won
1996	Favorite TV Actress (shared with Tia Mowry)	Sister, Sister	Won
1997	Favorite TV Actress (shared with Tia Mowry)	Sister, Sister	Won
1998	Favorite TV Actress (shared with Tia Mowry)	Sister, Sister	Nominated
1998	Hall of Fame (shared with Tia Mowry)	—	Won

=== People's Choice Award ===
Year	Award	Nominated work	Result
2012	Favorite TV Celebreality Star (shared with Tia Mowry)	Tia & Tamera	Nominated
2018	The Daytime Talk Show of 2018 (shared with Houghton, Love and Mai)	The Real	Nominated

=== Teen Choice Award ===
Year	Award	Performance	Result
2012	Choice TV Show: Reality (shared with Tia Mowry)	Tia & Tamera	Nominated
2012	Choice Reality TV Star: Female (shared with Tia Mowry)	Tia & Tamera	Nominated

=== Young Artist Award ===
Year	Award	Performance	Result
1995	Best Youth Comedienne in a TV Show (shared with Tia Mowry)	Sister, Sister	Nominated
1996	Best Performance by a Young Actress - TV Comedy Series (shared with Tia Mowry)	Sister, Sister	Nominated
1997	Best Performance in a TV Comedy - Leading Young Actress (shared with Tia Mowry)	Sister, Sister	Nominated
2001	Best Performance in a TV Movie (Comedy) - Leading Young Actress (shared with Tia Mowry)	Seventeen Again	Nominated
