= Law & Order season 15 =

Season of American television series

Law & Order
- Season 15
- Season 15 U.S. DVD cover
- Starring: Dennis Farina; Jesse L. Martin; S. Epatha Merkerson; Sam Waterston; Elisabeth Röhm; Fred Dalton Thompson; Annie Parisse; Michael Imperioli
- No. of episodes: 24

Release
- Original network: NBC
- Original release: September 22, 2004 – May 18, 2005

Season chronology
- ← Previous; Season 14 Next → Season 16

The fifteenth season of Law & Order premiered on NBC with a two-hour premiere on September 22, 2004, and concluded on May 18, 2005. This is the last season to feature Elisabeth Röhm before she was replaced by Annie Parisse.

== Cast and crew changes ==
In May 2004, it was announced that Dennis Farina would be replacing Jerry Orbach (Detective Lennie Briscoe) as Detective Joe Fontana. Orbach, whose decade-long illness with prostate cancer had not been revealed to the general public, had moved over to the third Law & Order spin-off, Law & Order: Trial by Jury, which gave him a lighter schedule than the original series, but he was only able to appear in the first two episodes of that series, both of which aired after his death in December 2004.

Assistant District Attorney Serena Southerlyn, played by Elisabeth Röhm, became the first ADA to reach her fourth season on Law & Order. However, midway through the season it was announced that Röhm wanted to depart the series. Röhm said to MSNBC, "If I had stayed, I don’t think it would have made much sense, and as much as I loved the show I personally had to kind of kick myself out of the crib." She continued, "It was very hard for me to make the decision because my managers and agents wanted me to not even do any of this season." Röhm's last episode was "Ain't No Love" (episode 13) in which her character comes out as a lesbian at the end of the episode.

In December 2004, it was announced that Röhm was replaced by Annie Parisse who began portraying Assistant District Attorney Alexandra Borgia with the episode "Fluency". Parisse said, "I'm so excited to be a part of such a great show. I had so much fun when I did an episode a couple years ago and I'm really looking forward to working with everyone on a regular basis." Creator Dick Wolf said of the casting, "Annie is a terrific actress, and her new character (Alexandra Borgia) is an exotic beauty whose looks belie the fact that she is usually the smartest person in the room."

Days prior to the news of Annie Parisse joining the cast, it was announced that Jesse L. Martin (Detective Ed Green) would be temporarily departing the cast to film Rent. Martin said about his departure, "I am very grateful to everyone at Wolf Films and NBC Universal Television, especially Dick Wolf and Jeff Zucker, for allowing me this once in a lifetime opportunity, I'm going to miss Dennis (Farina), Epatha (Merkerson) and the rest of the cast and crew, and I can't wait to return next year." Dick Wolf added, "For the past six years, Jesse has been an 'actor's actor', an incredible performer, total professional and he is liked by everyone. He had an opportunity to reprise a career-making role that is very important to him, and we wanted to make it work. We look forward to his return to Law & Order for season 16." Martin's last episode of the season was "Tombstone" (a crossover episode with Law & Order: Trial by Jury, episode "Skeleton") in which Green is shot.

Martin was replaced by Michael Imperioli who portrayed Detective Nick Falco starting with the episode "Publish and Perish" until the season finale episode. Imperioli said about his character, Falco, "The character I'm playing on Law & Order, has a real passion for making the world safe and making the city safe for people. He wants to make sure that the bad guys go to jail and that justice wins out and I think he grew up with that reverence and lives with it."

Roz Weinman became showrunner/executive producer with Eric Overmyer over Matthew Penn and Peter Jankowski. Weinman and Overmyer depart the series at the end of the season, replaced by Walon Green and Nicholas Wootton in season 16.

== Cast ==
=== Main ===
- Dennis Farina as Senior Detective Joe Fontana
- Jesse L. Martin as Junior Detective Ed Green (Episodes 1–20)
- S. Epatha Merkerson as Lieutenant Anita Van Buren
- Sam Waterston as Executive Assistant District Attorney Jack McCoy
- Elisabeth Röhm as Assistant District Attorney Serena Southerlyn (Episodes 1–13)
- Fred Dalton Thompson as District Attorney Arthur Branch
- Annie Parisse as Assistant District Attorney Alexandra Borgia (Episodes 14–24)
- Michael Imperioli as Junior Detective Nick Falco (Episodes 21–24)

=== Recurring ===
- Leslie Hendrix as M.E. Dr. Elizabeth Rodgers
- John Cariani as CSU Technician Julian Beck
- Selenis Leyva as Detective Mariluz Rivera

=== Guest ===
- Michael Bloomberg as Himself
- J. K. Simmons as Dr. Emil Skoda
- Carolyn McCormick as Dr. Elizabeth Olivet
- Dann Florek as Captain Don Cragen

== Episodes ==
No. overall	No. in season	Title	Directed by	Written by	Original release date	Prod. code	U.S. viewers (millions)
326	1	"Paradigm"	Matthew Penn	S : Dick Wolf; T : Richard Sweren	September 22, 2004	E5301	18.86
Green and his new partner, Joe Fontana, investigate the murder of Lindsey Starr, an Iraq War veteran involved in the Abu Ghraib prison abuse scandal. But when an arrest is made, McCoy and Southerlyn go up against a deceased inmate's sister who claims she was acting in defense of her country. Cast: First appearance of Dennis Farina as Senior Detective Joe Fontana. Guest starring: Sarita Choudhury as Nadira Harrington, Michael Bloomberg as Himself.
327	2	"The Dead Wives Club"	David Platt	Nick Santora	September 29, 2004	E5307	15.39
When a woman Donna Mclean is found dead after a ferry collides with a Manhattan dock, Detectives Fontana and Green become suspicious when they learn that the victim sustained a blow to the head and was seen in the water just before the accident, and the likely suspect is the ex-wife of a firefighter who left her to marry a rich "9/11" widow. But EADA McCoy soon learns that the defendant's crafty lawyer Vanessa Galliano intends to position her as a victim of post-traumatic stress syndrome owing to 9/11, meaning that McCoy has to overcome extreme emotions common to every New Yorker. Cast: Last appearance of J. K. Simmons as Dr. Emil Skoda until he returns for three more appearances in season 20. Guest starring: Amy Carlson as Collette Connolly, and Roma Maffia as Vanessa Galliano
328	3	"The Brotherhood"	Jean de Segonzac	S : Wendy Battles; S/T : Alfredo Barrios, Jr.	October 6, 2004	E5304	12.94
When a prison gang puts out a contract on a Sing Sing corrections officer John Patrick Worley and his family, assigning the job to a newly released ex-con, the terrified officer pleads preemptive self-defense after he's brought to trial for the parolee's murder. As the trial proceeds, the gang attempts to affect the outcome of the case by sending a death threat to the presiding Judge Amanda Anderlee, who refuses to be intimidated. Shortly after the conclusion of the trial, McCoy discovers that the defendant's fears about the power and the reach of the gang were well-placed. Guest starring: Giancarlo Esposito as Defense Attorney Rodney Fallon, Gary Basaraba as John Patrick Worley, and Candice Bergen as Judge Amanda Anderlee.
329	4	"Coming Down Hard"	Richard Dobbs	Davey Holmes	October 13, 2004	E5308	12.51
When two college students take flying leaps to their deaths, Detectives Fontana and Green discover that both students were participants in a secret testing program on a new anti-depressant run by a large drug manufacturer that has yielded a high rate of suicides, and more attempted suicides. EADA McCoy decides to vigorously pursue the CEO of the pharmaceutical firm for second-degree murder but his case hinges on convincing the judge to admit guarded clinical trial info. Guest starring: Boris McGiver as Hjalmar Forskerskoler.
330	5	"Gunplay"	Constantine Makris	William N. Fordes & Lois Johnson	October 20, 2004	E5306	13.07
The NYPD gears up to find the cop-killers who murdered two officers Calvin May and Dexter Richmond during an illegal firearms buy-and-bust sting, putting Detectives Fontana and Green on the trail of two suspects as Green risks his life to pose as a gun buyer, to gather evidence on the gun dealers. They soon discover the killers were tipped off to the victims' identities by a website displaying photos of undercover cops. Turns out the website is financed by a vengeful defense attorney Gordon Samuels, whose criminal stepson was killed by the police; and now claims that he is protected by the First Amendment as McCoy and Southerlyn prepare to prosecute. McCoy is able to connect the hit men to the attorney who paid them to avenge the death of his gun-running stepson at the hands of the same detectives during a similar buy-and-bust several years earlier. Guest starring: Mustafa Shakir as Preston Hubbard, Wendell Pierce as Roger Porter, and Isiah Whitlock, Jr. as Gordon Samuels.
331	6	"Cut"	Richard Dobbs	Wendy Battles	October 27, 2004	E5302	13.23
After a bestselling pulp-fiction novelist Nora Hackett is found dead in her hotel bathroom, Detectives Fontana and Green investigate and discover that the deceased recently had a liposuction operation performed by a careless plastic surgeon Dr. Alvin Lawrence. EADA McCoy decides whether or not the case should be pursued in civil, not criminal court. But when District Attorney Branch sees a recurring thread of negligence in the doctor's past, McCoy files charges and bases much of his argument on the fact that the obsessed victim's many beauty procedures required psychological counseling that her greedy surgeon never suggested. Guest starring: Kate Burton, Carolyn McCormick, and Bruce Altman as Dr. Alvin Lawrence.
332	7	"Gov Love"	Michael Pressman	Richard Sweren & Ross Berger	November 3, 2004	E5313	15.15
In a controversial episode torn from recent headlines, Detectives Fontana and Green follow the sensational murder of the wife of Connecticut Governor Riordan, but their spadework turns up a corrupt developer Richard Kaplin whose business and romantic links to Riordan cause the official to step down in shame. However, EADA McCoy is stymied when he cannot get a third man to testify against the crooked business exec after he claims to have already married him, forcing the dogged McCoy to take the crucial gay marriage issue before the state's supreme court and Kaplan's defense attorney, Howard Pincham. Guest starring: Željko Ivanek as Richard Kaplin, Chris Sarandon as Defense Attorney Howard Pincham, and Robin Thomas as Connecticut Governor Michael Riordan.
333	8	"Cry Wolf"	Don Scardino	Nick Santora & Lorenzo Carcaterra	November 17, 2004	E5312	13.81
A street thug-turned-radio personality Christoff, who had a penchant for attracting headlines through "publicity stunt muggings" is thought to be faking again when he's shot and almost killed. However, when other bodies start to stack up, Detectives Fontana and Green now must believe the danger is for real, they begin to believe his story after they discover that the married jock was involved with a mobster's mistress. Guest starring: Joe Piscopo, Arthur J. Nascarella, Billy Porter, Tom Mason, and Jose Zuniga as Christoff.
334	9	"All in the Family"	Jace Alexander	William N. Fordes	November 24, 2004	E5303	12.62
After four people, including tourists, are shot dead on the same sidewalk, Detectives Fontana and Green learn that one was Roman Rybakov, a philandering jeweler with criminal ties to the Russian mob who was cooperating with federal authorities, until someone close to the victim "ratted him out." In the meantime, the investigators find the hitmen, but EADA McCoy must wrestle with the federal prosecutor over jurisdiction; and both cases might hinge on the fact that the jeweler was an Orthodox Jew. Guest starring: Charles Parnell as Assistant U.S. Attorney Mike Warner.
335	10	"Enemy"	Richard Dobbs	Alfredo Barrios, Jr.	December 1, 2004	E5314	14.71
In the bloody wake of a massacre of heroin dealers, Detectives Fontana and Green track through a list of international criminals until they target their primary suspect, a drug-dealing Afghan warlord Qaadar Khaleel, who is aided U.S. forces in Afghanistan and claims diplomatic immunity. But EADA McCoy and ADA Southerlyn fearlessly prosecute despite State Department pressure and a defense lawyer who claims his Afghan client was forced to push drugs in order to maintain his cover, and ultimately continue to aid American military efforts. Guest starring: Samrat Chakrabarti, Dylan Baker, and Christopher Maher as Qaadar Khaleel.
336	11	"Fixed"	Ed Sherin	Roz Weinman & Eric Overmyer	December 15, 2004	E5311	15.69
When a convicted child murderer, Dr. Jacob Lowenstein, is released from prison, he is struck by a car and left for dead by a motorist. Detectives Fontana and Green are not enthused about finding out who ran him over. When the murderer dies, they look inside the prison where he served his sentence, and they find evidence that leads EADA Jack McCoy to make a startling discovery. Guest starring: Dann Florek as Captain Donald Cragen, and David Groh as Dr. Jacob Lowenstein. Note: This episode is a direct sequel to the season 1 episode "Indifference".
337	12	"Mammon"	Jace Alexander	William N. Fordes & Douglas Stark	January 5, 2005	E5316	14.28
Not long after Greg Emerson, a wealthy venture capitalist, is found slain in his spacious home, Detectives Fontana and Green suspect the victim's feckless young wife Marley, as well as the handsome contractor Kenny Tremont who installed the security system and was romantically dallying with the wannabe widow. On the legal side, DAs McCoy and Southerlyn seek to turn the cheating wife against her ex-beau, but the bad boy's many "alibi girlfriends" and a second unexpected crime severely hamstring their prosecution. Guest starring: Liza Colón-Zayas as Luisa, John Benjamin Hickey as Defense Attorney Aaron Solomon, Andrea Roth as Marley Emerson, and Daniel Sunjata as Kenny Tremont.
338	13	"Ain't No Love"	Paris Barclay	Richard Sweren & Lois Johnson	January 12, 2005	E5315	14.69
Detectives Fontana and Green move to the beat of hip-hop when a legendary rapper is shot to death and evidence points to the victim's young protege Steven "Four Strike" Foreman, who was known to be cutting his own music on bootlegged street CDs, and more clues are found in one song's lyrics that describe a similar killing. As police tie in another previous murder, DAs McCoy and Southerlyn seek the email addresses from a thuggish record label's website that could unlock the case, even as the two prosecutors clash over admissible facts. As the investigation unfolds, Southerlyn's opinions put her sharply at odds with both McCoy and Branch, the latter of whom begins to feel that Southerlyn is not cut out to work in the DA's office. Southerlyn comes out as lesbian. Cast: Final appearance of Elisabeth Röhm as ADA Serena Southerlyn. Guest starring: Al Sapienza as Pete Andretti, and Jade Yorker as Anthony "Psycho" Harrison, and Sean Nelson as Steven "Four Strike" Foreman. Note: In 2005, this episode was ranked number 25 as part of TV Land's 'Top 100 Most Unexpected Moments in TV History'.
339	14	"Fluency"	Matthew Penn	Nick Santora	January 26, 2005	E5318	15.12
When nine afflicted people suddenly die, Detectives Fontana and Green discover that the victims were injected with fake flu vaccine that did not protect them, leading the police to arrest a career con man Elliot Peters, who has counterfeited everything, including what should have been a life-saving vaccine. But while EADA Jack McCoy is getting over the departure of ADA Southerlyn, he is joined by confident new ADA Alexandra Borgia, who boldly promises justice to the victims' relatives that will be difficult for the prosecutor to fulfill after vital search warrant evidence is tossed out. Cast: First appearance of Annie Parisse as ADA Alexandra Borgia. Guest starring: Kelly Coffield Park, Michael Marisi Ornstein, Xander Berkeley, Jordan Charney, and Robert Sedgwick as Elliot Peters.
340	15	"Obsession"	Constantine Makris	Wendy Battles & Alfredo Barrios, Jr.	February 9, 2005	E5319	13.16
After a controversial and conservative talk show host Larry Shea is shot to death, Detectives Fontana and Green consider a wealth of likely suspects but focus on Miranda Shea, who would inherit his estate only upon death, as well as on Karen Nix, a tormented woman who claims she had an affair with the new widow. As new ADA Borgia sizes up the case, she finds disturbing evidence that Karen was stalking the widow, whose secret love life yields a treasure trove of evidence. Guest starring: Marlyne Barrett, Sig Libowitz, Timothy Adams, Joseph Cross, Gerry Becker, Paula Devicq as Miranda Shea, and Dana Eskelson Karen Nix.
341	16	"The Sixth Man"	David Platt	S : Richard Sweren; S/T : Lois Johnson	February 16, 2005	E5321	13.74
When a loner Ira Walderman is found strangled to death in his rent-controlled apartment, Detectives Fontana and Green focus on both the victim's gambling habit and the building's owner who wants to convert it into a co-op, but the cops hit paydirt when they discover the dead man's nasty running feud with a spoiled pro basketball player. When the detectives find the athlete's fingerprints at the scene, prosecutors McCoy and Borgia must fight to keep the evidence from being tossed out on a technicality. Guest starring: Lamman Rucker as Reggie Uggams, and Joe Morton as Defense Attorney Leon Chiles.
342	17	"License to Kill"	Constantine Makris	Richard Sweren & Stuart Feldman	February 23, 2005	E5322	14.54
After a wild car chase through Manhattan's streets leaves one man dead and a teen injured, Detectives Fontana and Green connect some dots and discover that the chase began in upstate New York after a hunting party was massacred by the now deceased driver, but finding the man who chased the murderer puts prosecutors in a bind. As the reluctant hero Randall Stoller is publicly lauded for his efforts, prosecutors McCoy and Borgia carefully make their case that his poor decisions only endangered other lives. Guest starring: Mike Pniewski as Randall Stoller, and Michael Hyatt as Defense Attorney Julia Shinnear.
343	18	"Dining Out"	Jean de Segonzac	Davey Holmes	March 23, 2005	E5317	14.66
When a TV network executive Lisa Taylor is found murdered, Detectives Fontana and Green suspect twins who were stealing from the organization until they discover a celebrity chef with whom the married victim shared an affair. The nimble and charming chef is adroit at cultivating relationships with judges and juries alike, but prosecutor McCoy intends to reveal that the suspect's cooking show was about to be canceled by his late lover. Guest starring: Jason Sklar, Randy Sklar, Kamar de los Reyes, Wendie Malick, Ellen McElduff.
344	19	"Sects"	Richard Dobbs	Frank Pugliese	March 30, 2005	E5324	13.49
Detectives Fontana and Green are repulsed when they investigate the murder of Dolores Diamond, a woman, by Richard Ransen, a suicidal young man and discover a cult which encourages adult-child sexual relations, and prosecutor Borgia is determined to nail the mesmerizing but formidable woman who heads it. Aided by fellow EADA McCoy, Borgia traces a string of suicides from the surviving youths and searches for a secretive "Book of Daniel" that could wipe out the perverted sect forever. Guest starring: Marisa Ryan, Robin Lord Taylor, Merritt Weaver, Clifford David, David Thornton, Fran Lebowitz.
345	20	"Tombstone"	Eric Stoltz	Rick Eid	April 13, 2005	E5325	16.85
When a promiscuous young lawyer Jaquelyn Ogden is found bludgeoned to death in her office, Detectives Fontana and Green investigate her former lovers at the high-powered law firm until DNA evidence points to one attorney, Ron Drexler, who was in the office at the time of the murder. When evidence is dismissed by a judge, and a shocking crime takes place, EADA McCoy must leverage clout against a senior partner, Nathan Fogg, who is the suspect's alibi, as well as the subject of a U.S. Securities and Exchange Commission investigation. In the midst of the case, the life of one of the 27th precinct's own hangs in the balance. Cast: Detective Ed Green's shooting allowed actor by Jesse L. Martin to take a hiatus for the remainder of the season. Guest starring: Paul Fitzgerald as Ron Drexler, Fritz Weaver as Nathan Fogg, Robert Clohessy, and Linda Emond. Note: This episode begins a story that concludes on Law & Order: Trial by Jury in "Skeleton".
346	21	"Publish and Perish"	Constantine Makris	Tom Szentgyörgyi	May 4, 2005	E5328	14.33
The murders of Samantha Savage, an infamous porn actress, and Helen DeVries, a maverick publisher, plunge Detectives Fontana and his temporary partner Nick Falco into a sensational case that spirals upward to an ambitious and powerful police commissioner, Arnie MacLaren, who is up for the nation's top security post. But as District Attorney Branch warns, McCoy and the police must tread lightly given the high-profile players, especially when they discover a more intimate link. Cast: First recurring appearance by Michael Imperioli as Detective Nick Falco, temporarily replacing Jesse L. Martin's character, Detective Ed Green. Guest starring: Cyrus Farmer as Manager, Guy Boyd, Paul Schulze, Glenn Fleshler, Michael Tucker, Randy Graff as Helen DeVries, and Kevin Dunn as Arnie MacLaren.
347	22	"Sport of Kings"	Michael Pressman	S : Nick Santora; S/T : Richard Sweren & Wendy Battles	May 11, 2005	E5323	11.70
The shooting death of a Panamanian horse jockey puts Detectives Fontana and Falco on the track of a pack of colorful suspects who inhabit the competitive racing world, forcing them to nudge jockeys, trainers, and even a rich owner to discover who would murder the rider over his desire to ride one particular horse. However, their probe reveals that the victim challenged the registry and selling details of the prized three-year-old, leading the cops and EADA McCoy to a corporate head who bought the thoroughbred with stolen funds. Guest starring: Alfredo De Quesada, Maximiliano Hernández, Thomas G. Waites, Murphy Guyer, Reg Rogers, Scott Wilson, Jayne Atkinson, Lois Smith. Note: This episode airs a version of the title sequence that features both Imperioli in the main cast credits and Jesse L. Martin in the following cast shot, despite Martin not returning to the show until the following season.
348	23	"In God We Trust"	David Platt	Richard Sweren	May 18, 2005	E5326	12.22
Detectives Fontana and Falco arrest an arsonist after a blaze kills a fireman and discover a charred pistol that leads them to re-open a cold case murder of an African-American. Their remorseful prime suspect not only confesses but pleads not guilty due to his newfound faith and changed life. Even the skeptical EADA McCoy cannot ignore the "Clayton motion" filed by the defense attorney that asks for the case to be dismissed while church and public support build for the former racist who has worked hard for children's charities in the years since. Guest starring: Jim Moody, Michael Mulheren, Debra Monk, and Jim True-Frost as Dennis Langdon / Phil Newsom.
349	24	"Locomotion"	Matthew Penn	S : Roz Weinman; T : Eric Overmyer	May 25, 2005	E5329	12.41
A commuter train is violently derailed when it strikes an SUV parked on the tracks, resulting in 12 deaths, leaving Detectives Fontana and Falco sifting through massive debris, until they lock onto a depressed construction worker who maintains he only intended to commit suicide, not homicide. EADA McCoy cannot wait to get his hands on the case but his grip gets more slippery when the accused's attorney hints at an insanity defense, and the suspect later shocks everyone in court. Cast: Final recurring appearance of Michael Imperioli as Detective Nick Falco. He reprises the role in the episode "Hindsight" as a guest star. Guest starring: John Boyd as Zach Burns, Giancarlo Esposito as Defense Attorney Rodney Fallon.

== Releases ==
Season fifteen is available on DVD. Initially, it was only available as part of the Law & Order: The Complete Series DVD boxed set, released in November 2011. It was later released separately on November 4, 2014.
