= Law & Order season 12 =

Season of American television series

Law & Order
- Season 12
- Season 12 U.S. DVD cover
- Starring: Jerry Orbach; Jesse L. Martin; S. Epatha Merkerson; Sam Waterston; Elisabeth Röhm; Dianne Wiest
- No. of episodes: 24

Release
- Original network: NBC
- Original release: September 26, 2001 – May 22, 2002

Season chronology
- ← Previous; Season 11 Next → Season 13

The following is a list of Law & Order episodes from the series' twelfth season, which originally aired from September 26, 2001, to May 22, 2002. This season is the last season to feature Dianne Wiest as DA Nora Lewin and the first to feature Elisabeth Röhm as ADA Serena Southerlyn.

== Cast ==
Season 12 began with a mostly unchanged cast. Serena Southerlyn (played by Elisabeth Röhm) replaced season 11's Abbie Carmichael (Angie Harmon) in the role of Assistant District Attorney. Dianne Wiest, who stepped into the role of Interim DA Nora Lewin the previous season, left the cast at the end of this season.

=== Main ===
- Jerry Orbach as Senior Detective Lennie Briscoe
- Jesse L. Martin as Junior Detective Ed Green
- S. Epatha Merkerson as Lieutenant Anita Van Buren
- Sam Waterston as Executive Assistant District Attorney Jack McCoy
- Elisabeth Röhm as Assistant District Attorney Serena Southerlyn
- Dianne Wiest as Interim District Attorney Nora Lewin

=== Recurring ===
- Leslie Hendrix as Dr. Elizabeth Rodgers
- J. K. Simmons as Dr. Emil Skoda
- John Cariani as CSU Technician Julian Beck
- Andrea Navedo as Det. Ana Cordova

== Episodes ==
No. overall	No. in season	Title	Directed by	Written by	Original release date	Prod. code	U.S. viewers (millions)
254	1	"Who Let the Dogs Out?"	Don Scardino	Kathy McCormick & Douglas Stark	October 3, 2001	E2208	20.68
The investigation into the death of Sandy Meekin, a jogger mauled by a vicious dog, leads to an Attica inmate, his attorneys, and an underground dog-fighting ring. Cast: First appearance of Elisabeth Röhm as ADA Serena Southerlyn. Guest starring: Melissa Leo as Sherri Quinn.
255	2	"Armed Forces"	Martha Mitchell	Richard Sweren & Sean Jablonski	October 10, 2001	E2210	22.55
The fatal stabbing of Joseph Eastman leads to the discovery of his status as a Vietnam war veteran and the truths uncovered about an incident that occurred with him and three former soldiers in his division.
256	3	"For Love or Money"	Constantine Makris	Wendy Battles & Sean Jablonski	October 17, 2001	E2207	22.07
The death of parolee Ronnie Buck, who was a hit man, leads to a wealthy widow and daughter who may have hired him to kill their rich relative.
257	4	"Soldier of Fortune"	Richard Dobbs	Barry Schindel	October 24, 2001	E2206	21.39
The daring daylight kidnapping of a diamond dealer, which results in two murders at the scene, uncovers an international dynasty of blood diamonds sales and its links to a foreign civil war. Guest starring: Lance Reddick as Captain Maru Gasana.
258	5	"Possession"	James Quinn	Robert Palm	October 31, 2001	E2202	18.07
Investigating the murder of Virginia Boone, a woman in a rent-controlled apartment, Green and Briscoe initially turn their attention to janitor Roberto Ramos, who had been given a cash gift of $5,000 by the deceased but claimed he didn't remember her when questioned. But it isn't long before the detectives discover that she was engaged in a long-running battle with her landlord and had been blocking the potentially lucrative sale of the building.
259	6	"Formerly Famous"	Richard Dobbs	Wendy Battles & Marc Guggenheim	November 7, 2001	E2201	18.96
The shooting death of a former singer's wife leads the detectives to investigate his manager and sons after his explanation of the events surrounding her death have no credibility. Guest starring: Gary Busey as Tommy Vega. Note: Based on the murder of Bonny Lee Bakley
260	7	"Myth of Fingerprints"	David Platt	S : Eric Overmyer; T : Terri Kopp & Aaron Zelman	November 14, 2001	E2209	20.42
A murder investigation uncovers deliberately faulty forensics in the wrongful conviction of two men 12 years earlier in the case that paved the way for Van Buren's promotion.
261	8	"The Fire This Time"	David Platt	David Black	November 21, 2001	E2205	17.77
When a building is set ablaze, a girl must be identified despite her fatal burns. Through further investigation, it turns out that an extreme environmentalist group struck the match.
262	9	"3 Dawg Night"	Stephen Wertimer	S : Aaron Zelman; S/T : Richard Sweren	November 28, 2001	E2203	20.22
When a celebrity is implicated in a nightclub murder, McCoy and Southerlyn battle the flaks who attempt to insulate their client from any involvement or interrogation. Guest starring: Idris Elba as Lonnie Liston, Kerry Washington as Allie Lawrence, and Mustafa Shakir as Mike. Note: Based on the 1999 Club New York shooting involving Sean Combs and Jennifer Lopez.
263	10	"Prejudice"	Ed Sherin	Jill Goldsmith	December 12, 2001	E2213	19.39
The murder of Thomas Reddick, a magazine publishing company's black CEO, leads to a suspect who has a clear streak of racism and whose attorney intends on using that as a mental defect. Note: Reference to Law & Order season 5 episode: "Rage"
264	11	"The Collar"	Matthew Penn	Richard Sweren	January 16, 2002	E2214	19.95
The death of Father Grady, a cleric, leads the detectives to a priest who was given information by a murder suspect outside of the church but insists that he can't discuss anything about it, bringing McCoy to question whether the confessional seal should apply.
265	12	"Undercovered"	Jace Alexander	Wendy Battles & Noah Baylin	January 23, 2002	E2220	21.17
The father of a dying girl gets his revenge on Warren Slater, an insurance executive who denied a leukemia treatment for his daughter. One problem arises when the father is technically on both sides of the law.
266	13	"DR 1-102"	Richard Dobbs	Marc Guggenheim & Aaron Zelman	January 30, 2002	E2216	20.56
The bludgeoning of two women in their apartment leads the detectives to a suspect who has taken a hostage while demanding legal representation. Southerlyn's actions to secure the hostage's release, while heroic, result in disbarment proceedings against her for violation of Disciplinary Rule 1-102.
267	14	"Missing"	David Platt	S : Barry Schindel; T : Eric Overmyer & Matt Witten	February 6, 2002	E2212	18.95
When a girl's parents frantically search for her, Briscoe and Green see that the girl's belongings were packed up in her apartment. They learn that the girl had been seeing a married man — her boss. When the boss is brought up on charges, his wife sheds some new evidence.
268	15	"Access Nation"	Constantine Makris	Sean Jablonski & Terri Kopp	February 13, 2002	E2215	17.90
The murder of psychologist Tracy Conley leads to a case involving a computer company that sells information and their responsibility in shielding their clients' history in order to serve their needs. Guest starring: Hassan Johnson as Arnold, Kevin Kane as Matt Preminger, Frank Whaley as John McDowell, Josh Radnor as Robert Kitson.
269	16	"Born Again"	Jace Alexander	S : William N. Fordes; T : Jill Goldsmith & Matt Witten	February 20, 2002	E2204	20.09
The investigation into the death of 11-year-old Paula Weston uncovers the possible culpability of the child's mother and a rebirthing therapist.
270	17	"Girl Most Likely"	Steve Shill	Lynn Mamet	February 27, 2002	E2227	19.25
When high school student Julie Cade is found dead in an apartment building, Briscoe and Green suspect that the murder was a result of her getting a message board shut down. As McCoy and Southerlyn investigate the case further, they realize that her best friend Alicia Milford, who was reluctant to come forward as a witness, may be the answer to the murder. Guest starring: Noah Fleiss as Denny Cannon, and Caroline Dhavernas as Alicia Milford.
271	18	"Equal Rights"	James Quinn	Terri Kopp	March 13, 2002	E2221	18.93
A stock analyst's murder leads Briscoe and Green to a corporation whose stock had fallen. Guest starring: Bob Dishy as Defense Attorney Lawrence "Larry" Weaver.
272	19	"Slaughter"	Constantine Makris	Rob Wright	March 27, 2002	E2218	19.54
The investigation of the murder of university student Andrew Hatcher leads to a case involving meat contamination at a food service.
273	20	"Dazzled"	Lewis H. Gould	Eric Overmyer & Matt Witten	April 10, 2002	E2224	19.15
When Katy Snyder, a "gold digging" wife, is found dead, there are plenty of possible perpetrators. Her husband has become "whipped" and blinded by his young wife and then messes up his story to Briscoe and Green. When he finally comes around, it seems that the wife's ex-boyfriend was getting revenge for being fired from a contracting job. The medical examiner uncovers some more clues which point to a bitter alcoholic ex-wife. Eventually, the criminal comes forward but the only crime she has committed is trying to save her family.
274	21	"Foul Play"	Richard Dobbs	Richard Sweren & Stuart Feldman	May 1, 2002	E2222	19.30
The investigation into the death of Mike Drucker, a private investigator, uncovers corruption, deceit, and immigration fraud in a Youth Baseball League whose manager will go to any lengths to win.
275	22	"Attorney Client"	Matthew Penn	Jill Goldsmith	May 8, 2002	E2225	19.77
The wife of an attorney with many disgruntled clients is killed, but the detectives believe that he was the intended target as he was willing to reveal information despite confidentiality agreements. As the investigation continues, his tumultuous love life is exposed and the prosecutors are suspicious of his desire to return to the courtroom. Guest starring: Peter Friedman as Harold Jensen, Annie Parisse as Jasmine Blake, Randy Graff as Hillary Morton, Lord Jamar as Leon Griggs. Note: Parisse would later be cast in the main role of ADA Alexandra Borgia in seasons 15–16.
276	23	"Oxymoron"	Constantine Makris	Michael Harbert	May 15, 2002	E2217	18.30
The murder of young doctor Eliza Glazer leads Briscoe and Green to her involvement in an underground oxycodone ring, of which the leaders have hatched a plan to con McCoy and Southerlyn out of a trial.
277	24	"Patriot"	David Platt	William N. Fordes & Sean Jablonski	May 22, 2002	E2226	19.51
A tenement building explodes and the lone victim is Joseph Haden. The building was rent controlled and there had been a tenant strike, so the police initially suspect arson. But the landlord doesn't have insurance, ruling out their arson theory, and the medical examiner discovers that Haden's neck was broken and he was tied up before the explosion happened. Trying to figure out Haden is even more difficult. He didn't appear to have a family or a girlfriend and never got any substantial mail. He worked at the Jiffy Job service station making minimum wage, yet had $90,000 in the bank. Briscoe and Green do some more digging and find out that Haden was using an alias, and his real name was Yusuf Haddad. Cast: Last appearance of Dianne Wiest as IDA Nora Lewin.
