= List of Law & Order characters =

Fictional character list

Law & Order follows the fictional cases of a group of police detectives and prosecutors who represent the public in the criminal justice system. Since its September 1990 debut, each season features a main cast of six main characters: two detectives and their supervising officer (Law) within the New York City Police Department, alongside two prosecuting district attorneys and the Manhattan District Attorney (Order). The first season followed detectives Max Greevey (George Dzundza) and Mike Logan (Chris Noth), and Captain Donald Cragen (Dann Florek); ADAs Ben Stone (Michael Moriarty) and Paul Robinette (Richard Brooks), and District Attorney Adam Schiff (Steven Hill).

The series, with a run of more than 20 seasons to date, is known for its revolving cast, with most of its original cast having left the show within the first five seasons. The longest-serving main cast members of the series are Sam Waterston as EADA/DA Jack McCoy (1994–2010, 2022–2024), S. Epatha Merkerson as Lieutenant Anita Van Buren (1993–2010), and Jerry Orbach as Detective Lennie Briscoe (1992–2004). The following is a list of characters by role type who have appeared over the various seasons since the series's premiere.

== Main characters ==
Law & Order main characters
Character	Portrayed by	Position	Seasons																										
Character	Portrayed by	Position	1	2	3	4	5	6	7	8	9	M	10	11	12	13	14	15	16	17	18	19	20	21	22	23	24	25	26
Max Greevey	George Dzundza	Senior Detective; Sergeant	Main																										
Mike Logan	Chris Noth	Junior Detective	Main	Main	Main	Main	Main					Main																	
Donald Cragen	Dann Florek	Captain	Main	Main	Main		Guest					Main	Guest					Guest											
Ben Stone	Michael Moriarty	Executive Assistant DA	Main	Main	Main	Main																							
Paul Robinette	Richard Brooks	Assistant DA	Main	Main	Main			Guest											Guest	Guest									
Adam Schiff	Steven Hill	District Attorney	Main	Main	Main	Main	Main	Main	Main	Main	Main		Main																
Phil Cerreta	Paul Sorvino	Senior Detective; Sergeant		Main (Note: Paul Sorvino was credited as a series regular through the eighth episode of the third season.)	Main																								
Lennie Briscoe	Jerry Orbach	Senior Detective			Main (Note: Jerry Orbach was first credited as a series regular with the ninth episode of the third season.)	Main	Main	Main	Main	Main	Main	Main	Main	Main	Main	Main	Main												
Anita Van Buren	S. Epatha Merkerson	Lieutenant				Main	Main	Main	Main	Main	Main	Main	Main	Main	Main	Main	Main	Main	Main	Main	Main	Main	Main						
Claire Kincaid	Jill Hennessy	Assistant DA				Main	Main	Main																					
Jack McCoy	Sam Waterston	Executive Assistant DA; Interim DA; DA					Main	Main	Main	Main	Main	Main	Main	Main	Main	Main	Main	Main	Main	Main	Main	Main	Main	Main	Main	Main			
Rey Curtis	Benjamin Bratt	Junior Detective						Main	Main	Main	Main	Main											Guest						
Jamie Ross	Carey Lowell	Assistant DA							Main	Main			Guest	Guest										Guest					
Abbie Carmichael	Angie Harmon	Assistant DA									Main		Main	Main															
Ed Green	Jesse L. Martin	Junior Detective; Senior Detective											Main (Note: Jesse L. Martin was not credited as a series regular for episodes 21 to 24 of the fifteenth season, due to his temporary exit from the series. He returned with the first episode of the sixteenth season.)	Main	Main	Main	Main	Main	Main	Main	Main								
Nora Lewin	Dianne Wiest	Interim District Attorney												Main	Main														
Serena Southerlyn	Elisabeth Röhm	Assistant DA													Main	Main	Main	Main											
Arthur Branch	Fred Thompson	District Attorney														Main	Main	Main	Main	Main									
Joe Fontana	Dennis Farina	Senior Detective																Main	Main										
Nick Falco	Michael Imperioli	Junior Detective																Main (Note: Michael Imperioli was credited as a series regular from episodes 21 to 24.)	Guest										
Alexandra Borgia	Annie Parisse	Assistant DA																Main	Main										
Nina Cassady	Milena Govich	Junior Detective																		Main									
Connie Rubirosa	Alana de la Garza	Assistant DA																		Main	Main	Main	Main						
Cyrus Lupo	Jeremy Sisto	Junior Detective; Senior Detective																			Main	Main	Main						
Michael Cutter	Linus Roache	Executive Assistant DA																			Main	Main	Main						
Kevin Bernard	Anthony Anderson	Junior Detective; Senior Detective																			Main	Main	Main	Main					
Frank Cosgrove	Jeffrey Donovan	Junior Detective; Senior Detective																						Main	Main				
Kate Dixon	Camryn Manheim	Lieutenant																						Main	Main	Main			
Nolan Price	Hugh Dancy	Executive Assistant DA																						Main	Main	Main	Main	Main	Main
Samantha Maroun	Odelya Halevi	Assistant DA																						Main	Main	Main	Main	Main	Main
Jalen Shaw	Mehcad Brooks	Junior Detective																							Main	Main	Main		
Vincent Riley	Reid Scott	Senior Detective																								Main	Main	Main	Main
Nicholas Baxter	Tony Goldwyn	District Attorney																								Main	Main	Main	Main
Jessica Brady	Maura Tierney	Lieutenant																									Main	Main	Main
Theo Walker	David Ajala	Junior Detective																										Main	Main
Rob Calvino	James Badge Dale	Senior Detective																											Main (Note: James Badge Dale was initially credited as a guest star in season 26 before being promoted to series regular beginning with the third episode.)

== Police ==
=== Max Greevey ===
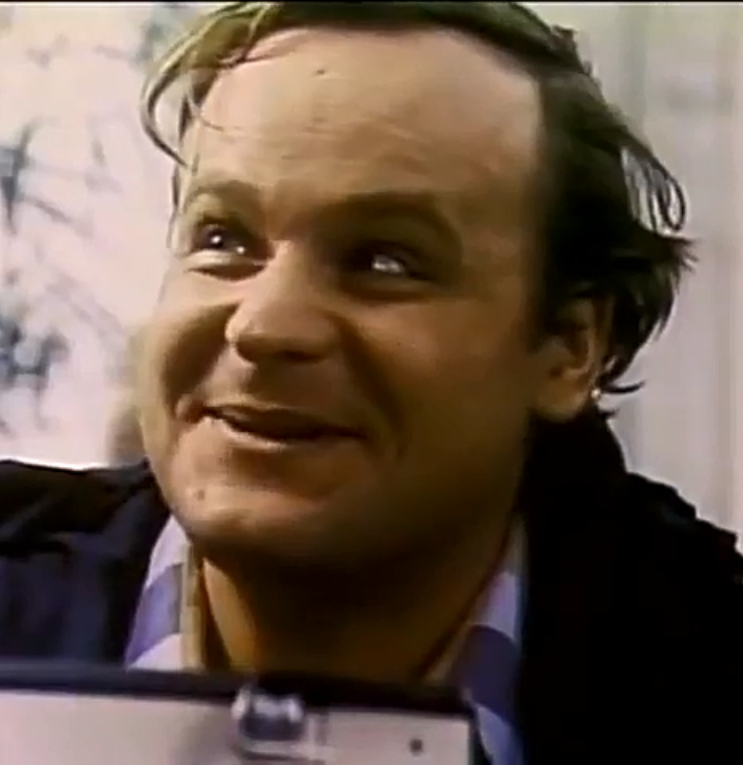
Max Greevey (pictured) was portrayed by George Dzundza during the first season (1990–1991). An uncredited actor appeared in the role for the character's final appearance.

- Portrayed by George Dzundza (1990–1991) (Note: During the second season premiere, Max was portrayed by an uncredited actor.)
- Episodes: "Prescription for Death" – "Confession"

Following the conclusion of the first season, Dzundza exited the role.

=== Mike Logan ===
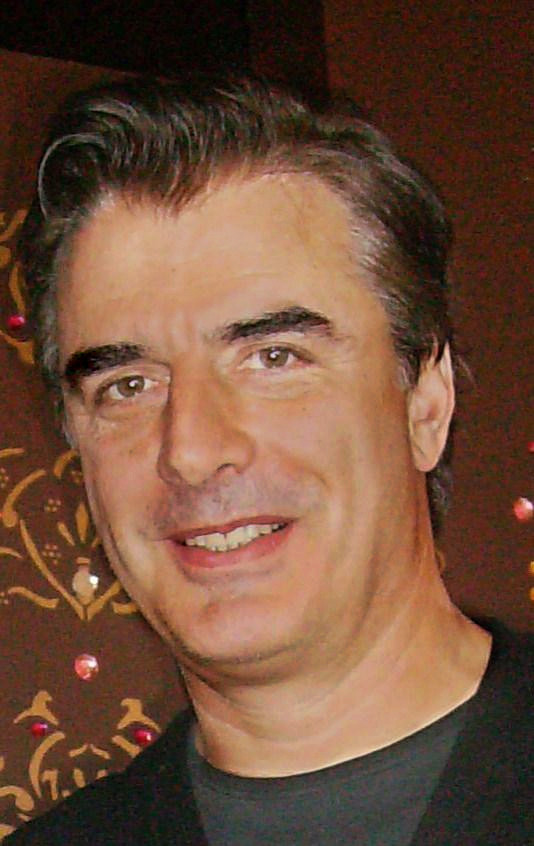
Chris Noth portrayed Mike Logan for the first five seasons of the series. He later reprised the role for Exiled: A Law & Order Movie (1998).

- Portrayed by Chris Noth (1990–1995)
- Episodes: "Prescription for Death" – "Pride"

=== Donald Cragen ===
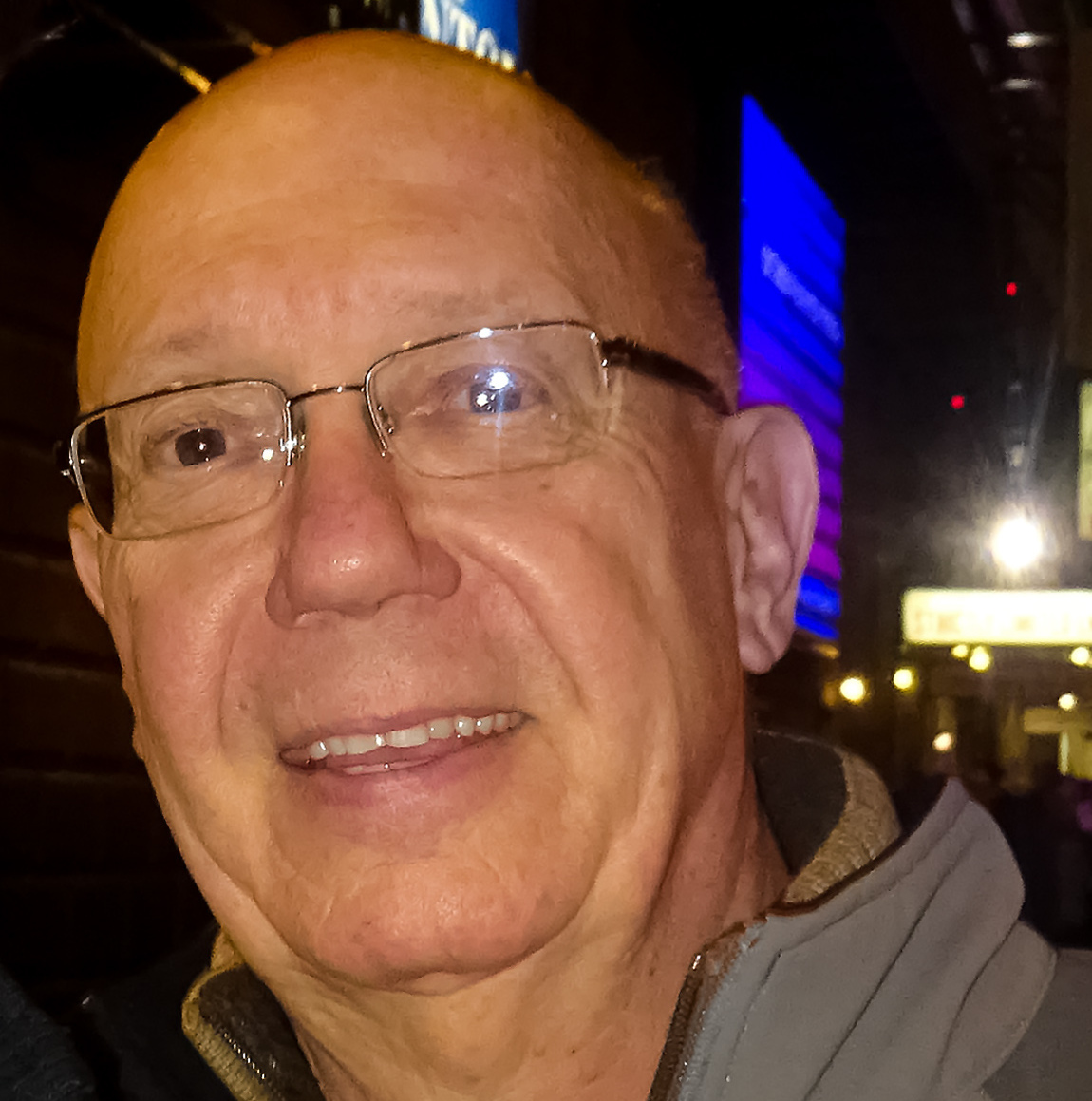
Dann Florek portrayed Donald Cragen for the first three seasons of the series. He later reprised the role for several episodes during subsequent seasons, and Exiled: A Law & Order Movie (1998).

- Portrayed by Dann Florek (1990–1993; 1995; 2000; 2004)
- Episodes: "Prescription for Death" – "Benevolence"; "Bad Faith"; "Entitled"; "Fixed"

=== Phil Cerreta ===
- Portrayed by Paul Sorvino (1991–1992)
- Episodes: "Confession" – "Point of View"

Sorvino exited the role, citing the exhausting filming schedule, a need to broaden his horizons, and the desire to preserve his vocal cords for singing opera. As a result, Phil departed the series after he was shot in the line of duty and transferred to an administrative position in another precinct.

=== Lennie Briscoe ===
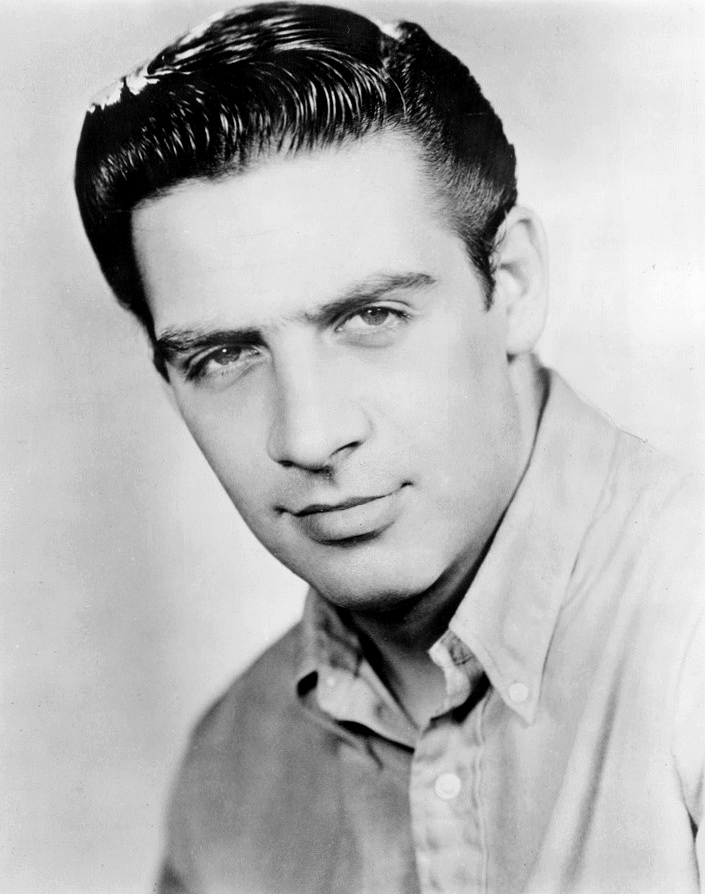
Jerry Orbach portrayed Lennie Briscoe from 1992 to 2004. He holds the distinction of being one of the series' longest-running cast members, appearing on over 275 episodes.

- Portrayed by: Jerry Orbach (1992–2004)
- Episodes: "Point of View" – "C.O.D."

=== Anita Van Buren ===
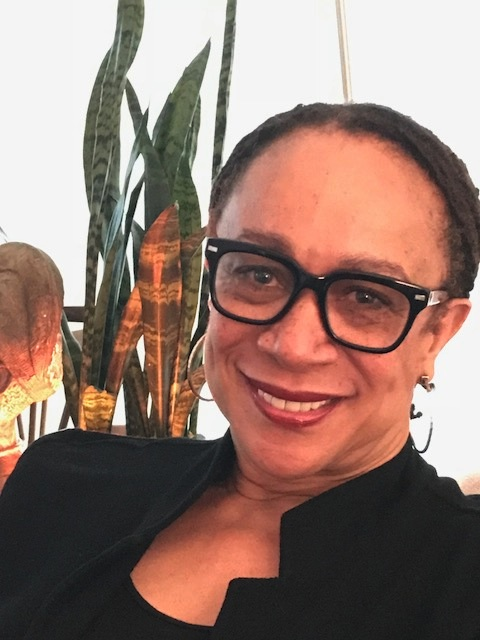
S. Epatha Merkerson portrayed Anita Van Buren from 1993 to 2010. Se holds the distinction of being one of the series' longest-running cast members, appearing on over 390 episodes, and is the longest-tenured actor during the series' original run (1990–2010).

- Portrayed by S. Epatha Merkerson (1993–2010)
- Episodes: "Sweeps" – "Rubber Room"

=== Rey Curtis ===
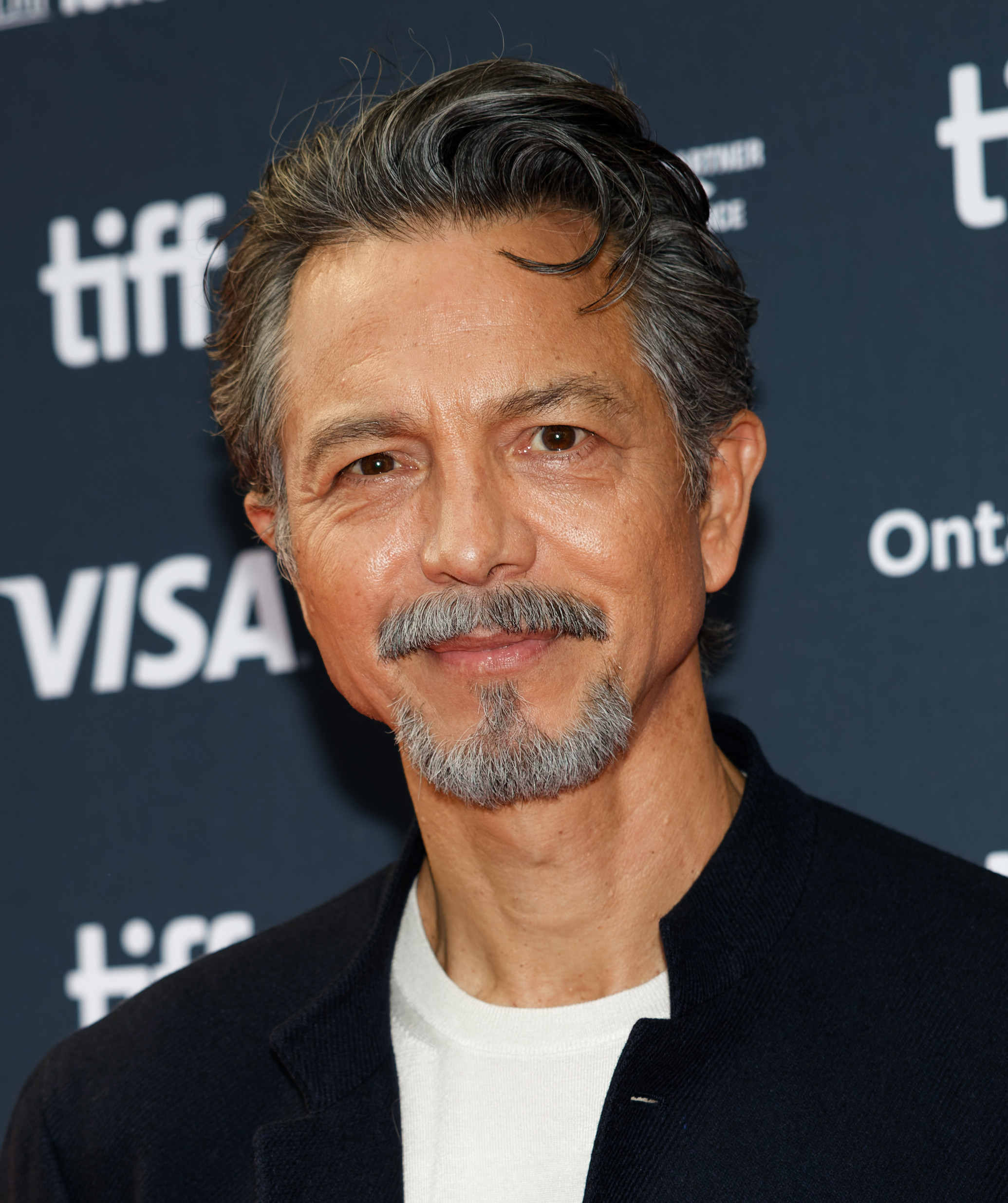
Benjamin Bratt portrayed Rey Curtis from 1995 to 1999. He reprised the role in 2009 when Rey's wife dies from multiple sclerosis (MS).

- Portrayed by Benjamin Bratt (1995–1999; 2009)
- Episodes: "Bitter Fruit" – "Refuge Part II"; "Fed"

=== Ed Green ===
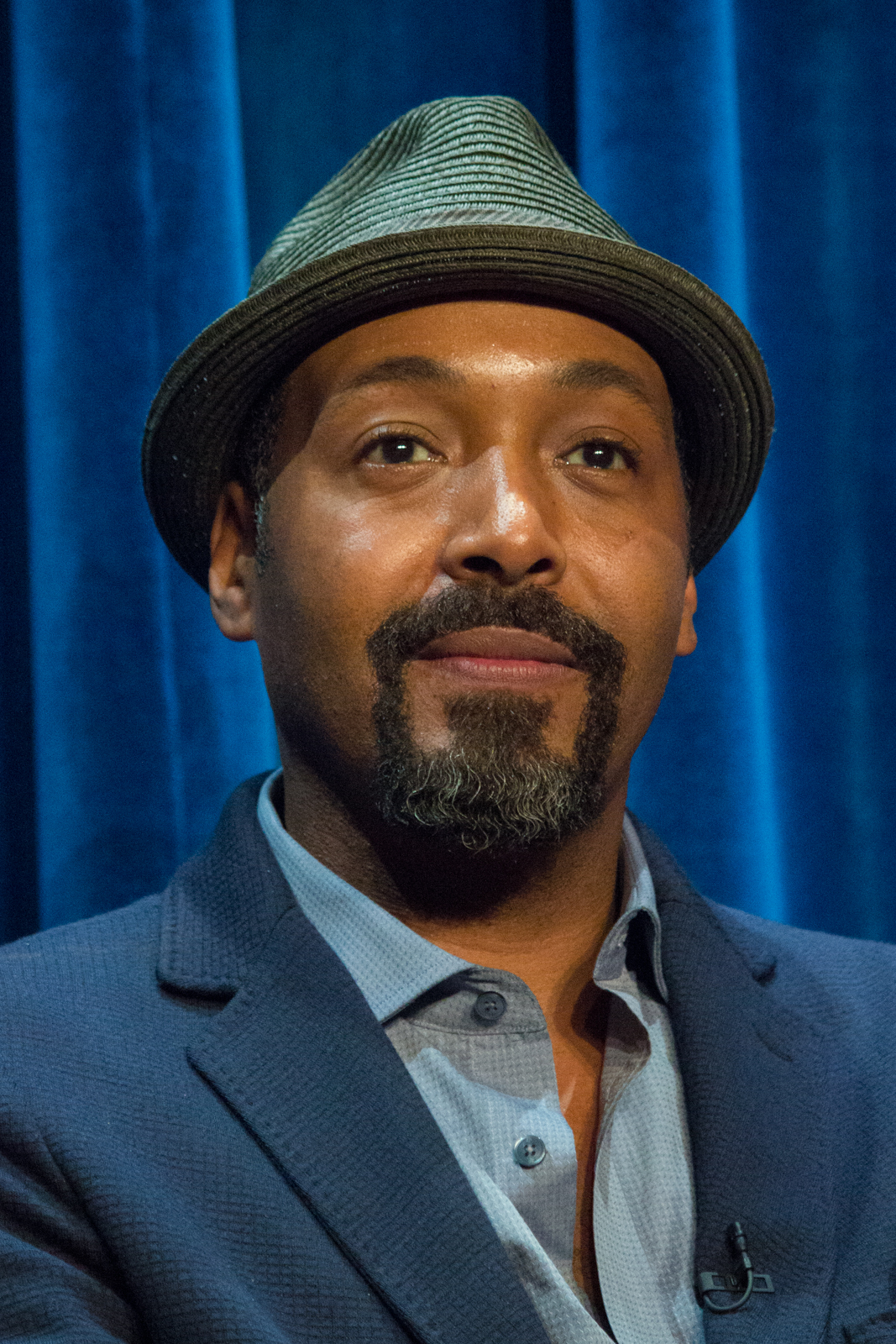
Jesse L. Martin joined the cast as Ed Green in 1999. He briefly exited the role during the fifteenth season to shoot Rent (2005). He returned that same year and exited the role in 2008 during the eighteenth season.

- Portrayed by Jesse L. Martin (1999–2008)
- Episodes: "Gunshow" – "Tombstone"; "Red Ball" – "Burn Card"

=== Joe Fontana ===
- Portrayed by: Dennis Farina (2004–2006)
- Episodes: "Paradigm" – "Invaders"

=== Nick Falco ===
- Portrayed by Michael Imperioli (2005–2006)
- Episodes: "Publish and Perish" – "Locomotion"; "Hindsight"

=== Nina Cassidy ===
- Portrayed by Milena Govich (2006–2007)
- Episodes: "Fame" – "The Family Hour"

=== Cyrus Lupo ===
- Portrayed by: Jeremy Sisto (2008–2010)
- Episodes: "Called Home" – "Rubber Room"

=== Kevin Bernard ===
- Portrayed by: Anthony Anderson (2008–2010; 2022)
- Episodes: "Burn Card" – "Rubber Room"; "The Right Thing" – "Black and Blue"

=== Frank Cosgrove ===
- Portrayed by: Jeffrey Donovan (2022–2023)
- Episodes: "Gimme Shelter – Part Three" – "Open Wounds"

=== Kate Dixon ===
- Portrayed by: Camryn Manheim (2022–2024)

=== Jalen Shaw ===
- Portrayed by Mehcad Brooks (2022–2024)
- Episodes: "Gimme Shelter – Part Three" – "Look the Other Way"

=== Vincent Riley ===
- Portrayed by: Reid Scott (2024–2026)
- Episodes: "Freedom of Expression" – Into the Mystic"

=== Jessica Brady ===
- Portrayed by: Maura Tierney (since 2024)

=== Theo Walker ===
- Portrayed by David Ajala (since 2025)
- Episodes: "Guardian" – present

=== Rob Calvino ===
- Portrayed by: James Badge Dale (since 2026)
- Episodes: "Into the Mystic" – present)

== Prosecutors ==
=== Executive Assistant District Attorneys ===
Name	Portrayed by	Year	Partners	Episodes	Notes
Benjamin Stone	Michael Moriarty	1990–1994	Paul Robinette, Claire Kincaid	88	Resigns due to his feelings of guilt over the death of a witness whose safety he tried to guarantee.; In 1996, Adam Schiff informs Jack McCoy that Stone is travelling in Europe.; In 2018, an episode of Law & Order: SVU discusses his death, and shows his funeral.
Jack McCoy	Sam Waterston	1994–2007	Claire Kincaid, Jamie Ross, Abbie Carmichael, Serena Southerlyn, Alexandra Borgia, Connie Rubirosa	405	Promoted to interim New York County District Attorney (2008); Begins his campaign to be elected as Manhattan DA in 2009, with support from Adam Schiff
Michael Cutter	Linus Roache	2008–2010	Connie Rubirosa	63	Promoted to Bureau Chief of the Sex Crimes Unit of the DA's office (2011).
Nolan Price	Hugh Dancy	2022–present	Samantha Maroun	TBD	

=== Assistant District Attorneys ===
Name	Portrayed by	Year	Partners	Episodes	Notes
Paul Robinette	Richard Brooks	1990–1993	Ben Stone	66	Resigns to pursue private practice in 1993.; Appears in three subsequent episodes as a defense attorney between 1996 and 2005.
Claire Kincaid	Jill Hennessy	1993–1996	Ben Stone, Jack McCoy	68	Dies in a car crash in 1996.
Jamie Ross	Carey Lowell	1996–1998	Jack McCoy	48	Former defense attorney who graduated from Columbia Law School; Resigns to pursue private practice and to spend more time with her daughter (1998), whom she had a bitter custody battle for with her ex.; Initially supported the death penalty, but eventually became an opponent.; Reappears as a defense attorney in 1999 and 2001.; Reappears as a judge in two episodes of Law & Order: Trial by Jury (2005).; Reappears in season 21 episode "The Right Thing" (2022).
Abbie Carmichael	Angie Harmon	1998–2001	Jack McCoy	72	Resigns to accept a job at the United States Attorney General's Office (2001).
Serena Southerlyn	Elisabeth Röhm	2001–2005	Jack McCoy	85	Fired by Arthur Branch for being inappropriately sympathetic towards a defendant she was prosecuting (2005).
Alexandra Borgia	Annie Parisse	2005–2006	Jack McCoy	34	Dies after being kidnapped and beaten during a murder trial (2006).
Connie Rubirosa	Alana de la Garza	2006–2010	Jack McCoy, Michael Cutter	85	Moves to Los Angeles and joins the DA's office there as a DDA (2011).; Later appears in Law & Order: Special Victims Unit as a federal prosecutor leading an investigation into an underage sex trafficking operation (2014).
Samantha Maroun	Odelya Halevi	2022–present	Nolan Price	TBD	

- In the 1997 season 7 episode "We Like Mike", Caleb Duff is listed as Assistant District Attorney beneath Adam Schiff as District Attorney and John J. McCoy as Executive Assistant District Attorney at the New York County District Attorney's Office, though he never appears on screen.

=== Manhattan District Attorneys ===
Name	Portrayed by	Terms	Episodes	Notes
Alfred Wentworth	Roy Thinnes	1988	1	Only appears in "Everybody's Favorite Bagman"
Adam Schiff	Steven Hill	1990–2000	228	Leaves office to work overseas for The Holocaust Project with Simon Wiesenthal and to investigate Swiss banks (2000).; Went with former President Jimmy Carter as part of a delegation to Zimbabwe (2008).
Nora Lewin	Dianne Wiest	2000–2002	48	Prior to her appointment as interim DA by the Governor of New York, she was a law professor (2000), which often provoked her critics to dismiss her as a detached academic with no practical experience.; Chooses not to run for election following her interim term (2002); The first woman in the program's history to hold the position of New York County District Attorney.
Arthur Branch	Fred Thompson	2002–2007	116	Branch's departure, the reason for which was never specified on the series, occurred after Thompson announced his campaign for the Republican Party's 2008 nomination for President.
Jack McCoy	Sam Waterston	2007–2010, 2022–2024	405	Appointed Interim DA after Branch's departure in 2007.; Begins his election campaign to become DA in 2009, winning the election that year.
Nicholas Baxter	Tony Goldwyn	2024–present	TBD	Appointed District Attorney after the departure of Jack McCoy.

== See also ==
- Law & Order (franchise) – Legal/criminal procedural television franchise
- List of Law & Order: Special Victims Unit characters – Fictional character list
- List of Law & Order: Criminal Intent characters – Fictional character list
- List of Law & Order: LA characters – Fictional character list
