= Law & Order season 10 =

Season of American television series

Law & Order
- Season 10
- Season 10 U.S. DVD cover
- Starring: Jerry Orbach; Jesse L. Martin; S. Epatha Merkerson; Sam Waterston; Angie Harmon; Steven Hill
- No. of episodes: 24

Release
- Original network: NBC
- Original release: September 22, 1999 – May 24, 2000

Season chronology
- ← Previous; Season 9 Next → Season 11

The tenth season of Law & Order premiered on NBC, September 22, 1999 alongside Law & Order: Special Victims Unit and ended May 24, 2000. Executive Producers René Balcer and Ed Sherin both left the show at the end of the season. This is the final season to feature Steven Hill as Adam Schiff, who was the last original cast member.

== Cast ==
This is the first season to feature Ed Green (played by Jesse L. Martin) who replaced seasons 6–9's Rey Curtis (Benjamin Bratt) in the role of junior detective. This season marked the first Law & Order spinoff, Law & Order: Special Victims Unit (Law & Order: SVU), which features Dann Florek reprising his role of Captain Donald Cragen from the first three seasons of Law & Order. Florek/Cragen appears in both parts of a two-part crossover between the two shows this season, and four other Law & Order: SVU characters appear in episodes of the original series over this season. Steven Hill, who played Adam Schiff, left the series at the end of the 10th season.

This season was the only season to feature all five of the series' longest running characters: Jack McCoy (19 seasons), Anita Van Buren (17 seasons), Lennie Briscoe (12 seasons), Adam Schiff (10 seasons) and Ed Green (9 seasons).

=== Main ===
- Jerry Orbach as Senior Detective Lennie Briscoe
- Jesse L. Martin as Junior Detective Ed Green
- S. Epatha Merkerson as Lieutenant Anita Van Buren
- Sam Waterston as Executive Assistant District Attorney Jack McCoy
- Angie Harmon as Assistant District Attorney Abbie Carmichael
- Steven Hill as District Attorney Adam Schiff

=== Recurring ===
- J. K. Simmons as Dr. Emil Skoda
- Leslie Hendrix as M.E. Dr. Elizabeth Rodgers
- Larry Clarke as Detective Morris LaMotte

=== Crossover stars from Law & Order: Special Victims Unit ===
- Christopher Meloni as Detective Elliot Stabler
- Mariska Hargitay as Detective Olivia Benson
- Richard Belzer as Detective John Munch
- Dann Florek as Captain Don Cragen

=== Guest ===
- Carolyn McCormick as Dr. Elizabeth Olivet
- Carey Lowell as Defense Attorney Jamie Ross
- Tovah Feldshuh as Defense Attorney Danielle Melnick

== Episodes ==
No. overall	No. in season	Title	Directed by	Written by	Original release date	Prod. code	U.S. viewers (millions)
206	1	"Gunshow"	Ed Sherin	René Balcer	September 22, 1999	E1106	18.63
A murderer's shooting spree of female medical school students in Central Park prompts Briscoe and his new partner, Detective Ed Green, to trace the murder weapon's origin; McCoy makes it his mission to punish both the killer and the gun manufacturer. Cast: First appearance of Jesse L. Martin as Det. Ed Green. Guest starring: Neal Huff as Dennis Trope, Ron McLarty as Trial Judge William Wright. Note: Based on the 1989 École Polytechnique massacre
207	2	"Killerz"	Constantine Makris	Richard Sweren	September 29, 1999	E1103	18.66
Briscoe and Green believe a 10-year-old is responsible for a child's death, and McCoy wants her isolated to stop any future fatalities. Guest starring: Carolyn McCormick as Dr. Elizabeth Olivet, Hallee Hirsh as Jenny Brandt.
208	3	"DNR"	David Platt	S : William N. Fordes; T : Kathy McCormick	October 6, 1999	E1109	17.90
As Briscoe and Green investigate the shooting of Judge Denise Grobman, suspicion quickly points to her husband Walter as the person who ordered the hit, but McCoy's case is hindered when she refuses to implicate her husband during the trial. Guest starring: John Heard as Walter Grobman. Note: Served as the basis for the Law & Order: UK series 4 episode "Denial".
209	4	"Merger"	Stephen Wertimer	Lynn Mamet	October 13, 1999	E1101	16.84
The murder of Christie Garrison, a drug-laden teen, presents Briscoe and Green with a host of suspects from her wealthy family.
210	5	"Justice"	Matthew Penn	S : William N. Fordes; S/T : Gerry Conway	November 10, 1999	E1104	17.70
After the murder of lawyer Martin Felder, McCoy finds himself on the opposite side of the courtroom from his former colleague, Jamie Ross, when she defends a man who claims to have key evidence that could put to death a man McCoy believes was wrongly convicted. Guest starring: Carey Lowell as Defense Attorney Jamie Ross.
211	6	"Marathon"	Jace Alexander	Richard Sweren & Matt Witten	November 17, 1999	E1105	17.69
A frustrating investigation of Eva Harrison, a purse-snatching victim who was fatally shot, leads to tension between Briscoe and Green over age and racial innuendos. Briscoe notices his partner has developed a dangerous habit.
212	7	"Patsy"	David Platt	René Balcer & Lynne E. Litt	November 24, 1999	E1102	17.64
The investigation that follows the discovery of Cecilia Knowles, a comatose woman in her apartment, leads to an unusual case involving murder and a possible frame-up, despite the prosecution having key DNA evidence to the contrary. Guest starring: Sebastian Roché as Ken Taylor; James Rebhorn as Defense Attorney Charles Garnett; David Harbour as Waiter Mike.
213	8	"Blood Money"	Matthew Penn	Barry Schindel	December 1, 1999	E1111	15.24
A taxi driver finds that his passenger Peter Grimaldi is dead, leading the detectives to a case involving an insurance scam and Holocaust victims. Guest starring: George Grizzard, Henderson Forsythe, Matt Servitto.
214	9	"Sundown"	Jace Alexander	S : William N. Fordes; S/T : Krista Vernoff	December 15, 1999	E1107	19.29
A patient, Marjorie Hallenbeck, is found beaten to death in a hospital lounge — and the resulting case involves infidelity, Alzheimer's disease, and a ladies' man. Guest starring: George Martin, Mark Pinter.
215	10	"Loco Parentis"	Constantine Makris	Richard Sweren & Matt Witten	January 5, 2000	E1115	18.28
After sanitation workers find the body of teenager Chris Skinner, the investigation leads to a school bully who displays an avid interest in martial-arts weapons, and whose father bought the murder weapon. Guest starring: Robert Clohessy as Robert Telford; Ned Eisenberg as Defense Attorney James Granick; Jacob Pitts as John Telford. Note: Reference to Law & Order Season 8 "Damaged".
216	11	"Collision"	David Platt	S : William N. Fordes; S/T : Gerry Conway	January 26, 2000	E1116	18.13
The investigation of the death of Karen Brewster, a schizophrenic woman, leads to a case involving Harvey Bauer, a homeless man, and his right to refuse medication. Guest starring: Tovah Feldshuh as Defense Attorney Danielle Melnick
217	12	"Mother's Milk"	Richard Dobbs	Lynn Mamet & Barry Schindel	February 9, 2000	E1110	18.38
Bloodstains in an apartment that belonged to Amy and James Beltran, a young couple with a baby, leads to the separated parents, each of whom claims that the other has the infant. The baby is later found dead. Guest starring: Michael C. Williams as Jimmy Beltran, Donna Murphy as Defense Attorney Carla Tyrell.
218	13	"Panic"	Constantine Makris	S : Kathy McCormick & Matt Witten; T : William N. Fordes & Lynn Mamet	February 16, 2000	E1117	17.92
Briscoe and Green investigate the shooting of P.K. Todd, a best-selling mystery writer, and the death of her accountant, with a love triangle involving the author's consulting FBI agent Dean Tyler as a possible motive for the crime. Guest starring: Tom Berenger as Dean Tyler, Ruthie Henshall, Linda Emond, Richard E. Council, Gerry Bamman.
219	14	"Entitled"	Ed Sherin	S : Dick Wolf, René Balcer & Robert Palm; T : Richard Sweren	February 18, 2000	E1112	18.92
The focus of the case previously investigated in "Mayhem" returns to a politically-influential family. During the course of the trial, McCoy finds the powerful matriarch to be a formidable opponent. Note: This episode concludes a crossover event that begins on Law & Order: Special Victims Unit season 1 episode 15 "Entitled". Cast: Richard Belzer as John Munch; Dann Florek as Donald Cragen; Mariska Hargitay as Olivia Benson; Christopher Meloni as Elliot Stabler.
220	15	"Fools for Love"	Christopher Misiano	Kathy McCormick & Lynne E. Litt	February 23, 2000	E1113	15.11
After the bodies of teens Jane Kendrick and Annika Ohlman are found, the detectives trace their identities and learn that one of them had a sister who was traveling with the girls. Guest starring: Mariska Hargitay as Olivia Benson, Christopher Meloni as Elliot Stabler, and Ellen Pompeo as Laura Kendrick. Note: Inspired by Karla Homolka, who helped rape and murder her sister and two other young girls.
221	16	"Trade This"	Jace Alexander	S : René Balcer; S/T : Barry Schindel	March 1, 2000	E1118	18.32
The murder of Sean Alvarez, a stockbroker, points to a coworker and supervisor Carl Braddock involved with organized crime when a hired hit man kills the prime suspect. Guest starring: Vincent Curatola as Joey Dantoni Sr., and Michael Gross as Carl Braddock.
222	17	"Black, White and Blue"	Constantine Makris	S : Richard Sweren; T : Matt Witten; S/T : Lynne E. Litt	March 22, 2000	E1120	18.67
The murder of Michael Tobin, a young white man in Harlem, sparks outrage when it is discovered that two police officers, Smith and Flannery, intentionally dropped him off in a known crime prone neighborhood. Guest starring: Ellen Foley, Kevin Smith, Earl Hindman.
223	18	"Mega"	David Platt	Lynn Mamet & William N. Fordes	April 5, 2000	E1121	17.99
The investigation into a helicopter bombing points to a victim's wife and her unconventional financial adviser Elias Grace. Guest starring: Annette O'Toole as Valerie Grace, Dana Wheeler-Nicholson as Maggie Callister, and Michael McKean as Elias Grace.
224	19	"Surrender Dorothy"	Martha Mitchell	Barry Schindel & Matt Witten	April 26, 2000	E1125	18.46
The body of Dorothy Graham, a teacher suspected of having an affair, is found in a car trunk and the investigation involves her husband and father-in-law, both of whom are psychiatrists. Guest starring: Jon Cypher, Lisa Emery, David Garrison.
225	20	"Untitled"	Jace Alexander	S : Richard Sweren; S/T : Barry M. Schkolnick	May 3, 2000	E1124	16.42
Wealthy woman Lucy Young, a patron of the arts, is found dead in her apartment and the ensuing investigation leads to a suspect whose violence was spurred by a painting similar to the crime scene. Guest starring: David Thornton, Steven Ogg, Bruce MacVittie, Spencer Garrett.
226	21	"Narcosis"	Constantine Makris	Kathy McCormick & Lynne E. Litt	May 10, 2000	E1123	18.64
The discovery of Lorraine Shelby, a strangled prostitute's body, leads to a case involving illegal immigrants and a family grappling with internet addiction. Guest starring: Ken Leung.
227	22	"High & Low"	Richard Dobbs	S : William N. Fordes; S/T : Gerry Conway	May 17, 2000	E1122	17.49
Detectives Briscoe and Green probe the strangulation of Leslie Cavanaugh, a college student who moonlighted as a stripper, and while they believe a pair of drug-dealing skinheads committed the murder, they struggle to determine the motive of the strip club owner who paid them for the hit. However, as they work their way up the ladder of complicity, the cops learn that the slaying is tied to an insider trading scam that forces McCoy to connect a former porn star with a businessman. Guest starring: Stephen Spinella, Adrienne Shelly (Note: Shelly's real-life murder in 2006 would later serve as inspiration for the Season 17 episode 'Melting Pot'.), Lori Tan Chinn, Bob Dishy.
228	23	"Stiff"	Jace Alexander	S : René Balcer; S/T : Hall Powell	May 24, 2000	E1119	15.12
The detectives' investigation into why a wealthy woman is comatose involves her husband, daughter, and doctor. Guest starring: David Dukes, Marin Hinkle, John Slattery, Thom Christopher, Susan Kellermann, Lee Wilkof.
229	24	"Vaya Con Dios"	Christopher Misiano	René Balcer & Richard Sweren	May 24, 2000	E1108	19.48
The death of an elderly man trying to find who was responsible for the torture-killing of his son in Chile in 1973 leads to a former high-ranking Chilean Army officer who is in New York receiving cancer treatments at a Manhattan hospital. Cast: Last appearance by Steven Hill as D.A. Adam Schiff. Guest starring: Julián Rebolledo, Michael Ealy, Olga Merediz, Tomas Milian, Joe Morton, Rebecca Schull, George Morfogen.
