= Law & Order: Trial by Jury =

American television series (2005–2006)

- Also known as: Law & Order: TBJ; Trial by Jury
- Genre: Legal drama
- Created by: Dick Wolf
- Starring: Bebe Neuwirth; Amy Carlson; Kirk Acevedo; Fred Dalton Thompson; Jerry Orbach; Scott Cohen
- Narrated by: Steven Zirnkilton (opening only)
- Opening theme: Theme of Law & Order: Trial by Jury
- Country of origin: United States
- Original language: English
- No. of seasons: 1
- No. of episodes: 13

Production
- Executive producers: Walon Green; Peter Jankowski; Dick Wolf
- Camera setup: Arriflex 16 SR3; Zeiss Super Speed; Angenieux HR and Canon Lenses
- Running time: 42 minutes
- Production companies: Wolf Films; NBC Universal Television Studio

Original release
- Network: NBC (episodes 1–12); Court TV (episode 13)
- Release: March 3, 2005 – January 21, 2006

Related
- Law & Order franchise

Law & Order: Trial by Jury is an American legal drama television series about criminal trials set in New York City. It was the fourth series in Dick Wolf's Law & Order franchise. The show's almost exclusive focus is on the criminal trial of the accused, showing both the prosecution's and defense's preparation for trial, as well as the trial itself. The series was first announced on September 28, 2004. The series premiered on Thursday, March 3, 2005, and ended on January 21, 2006. Its regular time slot was Fridays 10/9 p.m. ET on NBC. The last episode aired on Court TV months after the series' cancellation.

== Overview ==
In the criminal justice system, all defendants are innocent until proven guilty, either by confession, plea bargain, or trial by jury. This is one of those trials.

— Opening narration spoken by Steven Zirnkilton

Trial by Jury focuses on criminal legal procedures and preparation that are rarely depicted on other Law & Order series, such as jury selection, deliberations in the jury room, as well as jury research and mock trials prepared by the defense to use psychological studies and socioeconomic status profiling to their advantage. The episodes usually start with a witness or victim's personal account of a crime. This is a departure from the other Law & Order series, which usually begin by depicting either the actual crime or its discovery/reporting by civilians. The show progresses on from that point, showing how both sides develop their strategies for winning the case. In addition, a few episodes show jury deliberations. The show develops the judges as characters, showing scenes of them conferring with each other and reusing the same judges in multiple episodes.

=== Plot ===
The series follows Bureau Chief Tracey Kibre (Bebe Neuwirth), an Executive Assistant District Attorney assigned to Manhattan's homicide division. Kibre's team, including District Attorney Investigator Lennie Briscoe (Jerry Orbach) and Assistant District Attorney Kelly Gaffney (Amy Carlson), follows up on leads and interview witnesses, as well as participating in trials, during which both sides examine witnesses and give arguments. Similarly, the defense's preparation varies from episode to episode, running the gamut from testing arguments in front of jury focus groups to deal-making between co-defendants. Several pretrial meetings are held where some procedural issue is argued and ruled on.

== Cast and characters ==
The original cast of Law & Order: Trial by Jury (2005); from left, Amy Carlson, Bebe Neuwirth, Fred Thompson, Jerry Orbach, and Kirk Acevedo.

=== Main cast ===
- Bebe Neuwirth as Tracey Kibre, senior Assistant District Attorney (ADA) and Homicide Bureau Chief in the office of the New York County District Attorney (a.k.a. Manhattan DA). Tracey has a black-and-white view of the law. She is tough, tenacious, focused, and professional. Kibre has a strong working relationship with her staff. As chief of the Homicide Bureau, she is a senior prosecutor, subordinate only to the District Attorney and the Executive ADA.
- Amy Carlson as Kelly Gaffney, an ADA. Gaffney is Kibre's Deputy, who often challenges her senior colleague. She sees the law in shades of gray, and as a result is often more by-the-book.
- Jerry Orbach as Lennie Briscoe, a DA investigator. Briscoe was the longest-serving New York Police Department (NYPD) detective of the original Law & Order. Orbach succumbed to cancer over two months before the show's premiere, and he only appeared in the first two episodes of the series.
- Kirk Acevedo as Hector Salazar, a DA investigator. Salazar retired from the NYPD following an on-the-job injury which would have forced him behind a desk.
- Fred Dalton Thompson as Arthur Branch, the Manhattan DA. Branch is a tough Republican, who practices both legal and political conservatism. Thompson was simultaneously a series regular in the same role on this show and on the original Law & Order.
- Scott Cohen as Chris Ravell, an NYPD detective assigned to the ADA Kibre's team, succeeding Lennie Briscoe as Salazar's investigative partner. Cohen was credited as a guest appearance for episode 3 before being added to the main credits in episode 5. He did not appear in episode 4.

=== Recurring cast ===
- Candice Bergen as Amanda Anderlee, a New York Supreme Court judge in Manhattan (under New York State's archaic judicial nomenclature, the "Supreme Court" is a trial-level court and not the highest court in the state).
- Carey Lowell as Jamie Ross, a New York Supreme Court judge in Manhattan and former ADA.
- Seth Gilliam as Terence Wright, an ADA.
- Jessica Chastain as Sigrun Borg, an ADA.

=== Crossover guest cast ===
Law & Order
- Jesse L. Martin as Ed Green
- Dennis Farina as Joe Fontana
- S. Epatha Merkerson as Anita Van Buren
- Sam Waterston as Jack McCoy
- Carolyn McCormick as Elizabeth Olivet
- Leslie Hendrix as Elizabeth Rodgers
- Peter McRobbie as Trial Judge Walter Bradley

Law & Order: Special Victims Unit

- Christopher Meloni as Elliot Stabler
- Mariska Hargitay as Olivia Benson
- Richard Belzer as John Munch
- Diane Neal as Casey Novak
- Tamara Tunie as Melinda Warner

== Episodes ==
| No. | Title | Directed by | Written by | Original release date | Prod. code | U.S. viewers (millions) |
|---|---|---|---|---|---|---|
| 1 | "The Abominable Showman" | Jean de Segonzac | Dick Wolf | March 3, 2005 | E5701 | 17.29 |
Tough New York Assistant District Attorney Tracey Kibre tackles the murder of an aspiring Broadway actress, but has little evidence to prosecute the suspect; an acclaimed but arrogant theatre producer (Tony Bill) smugly knows that the police have found no blood or even a body. Kibre is joined by her unflappable deputy Assistant District Attorney, Kelly Gaffney, as they work with DA Investigators Briscoe and Salazar to pursue physical evidence while the producer's attorney (Annabella Sciorra) maneuvers to publicly portray the missing woman as promiscuous.
| 2 | "41 Shots" | Caleb Deschanel | Walon Green | March 4, 2005 | E5707 | 14.52 |
When a police officer is executed by a career criminal (Aliya Campbell), Kibre and Gaffney must overcome the fact that the accused was shot 41 times by police, not to mention the charges of police corruption leveled by the charismatic and cunning defense attorney (Peter Coyote). Kibre's plea for justice veers suddenly when evidence indicates the killer might be a federal agent's snitch, while she also fears the jury will sympathize when they see the bandaged man wheeled into court for his trial. Carey Lowell guest-stars as Judge Jamie Ross. note: This is the final episode of the 283 episodes across the Law & Order franchise for Jerry Orbach (Lennie Briscoe), who died after filming this episode.
| 3 | "Vigilante" | Dwight H. Little | David Wilcox | March 11, 2005 | E5712 | 10.69 |
Kibre and Gaffney face the unpopular job of prosecuting a father (Aidan Gillen) accused of murdering a paroled child molester who had approached his daughter. The case takes on an added twist when they investigate why his self-appointed lawyer (Lorraine Bracco) is so passionate about representing him. Later, new evidence about the pedophile's intentions is uncovered and District Attorney Branch knows the unwelcome publicity fallout for his department could hurt his chance at reelection. Scott Cohen appears as Detective Chris Ravell in a guest role. He joins the cast officially by the fifth episode, "Baby Boom" where he's added to the opening credits.
| 4 | "Truth or Consequences" | Constantine Makris | Story by : David Wilcox & Walon Green; Teleplay by : David Wilcox | March 18, 2005 | E5703 | 11.54 |
After a young woman is raped and murdered, ADAs Kibre and Gaffney are stymied by a triangle of suspects, three friends who include a rich boy (Warren Blosjo), a bad boy (Adam LaVorgna), and the victim's ex-boyfriend Danny (Ebon Moss-Bachrach). As the prosecutors try to turn one against the other, they wonder who is playing whom. When Danny seems the least likely to lie, though, Kibre wants to make a deal with him, but she worries he might be manipulating the facts to gain the jury's sympathy.
| 5 | "Baby Boom" | Michael Pressman | Story by : Pamela J. Wechsler; Teleplay by : Joan Rater & Tony Phelan | March 25, 2005 | E5704 | 11.07 |
The team from the DA's office attend Lenny Briscoe's funeral service. Kibre and Gaffney prosecute a young nanny (Elisabeth Moss) accused of murder for shaking an infant and bashing in her head, but they run into a stone wall when the presiding judge (Aasif Mandvi) intentionally blocks every move they make. After Kibre rejects Gaffney's desperate offer to resign to blunt the judge's irrational ire, they discover the tough defense attorney has coached his client well and intends to point the finger of murder elsewhere. note:The episode is dedicated to Jerry Orbach.
| 6 | "Pattern of Conduct" | Constantine Makris | Story by : Pamela J. Wechsler; Teleplay by : Pamela J. Wechsler & Walon Green | April 1, 2005 | E5710 | 10.58 |
Kibre faces an obstacle course when she prosecutes a famous pro basketball player (Damaine Radcliff) for killing his girlfriend, but first she must get past the starstruck grand jury, a legion of fans, a savvy defense lawyer, and the player's beautiful trophy wife (Sherri Saum), who is determined to hang on to what she has. Although other women have been assaulted by the defendant, Kibre and Gaffney have a difficult time getting them to testify, and new evidence that the victim had previously attempted suicide adds to the complexities of this case.
| 7 | "Bang & Blame" | Caleb Deschanel | Chris Levinson | April 8, 2005 | E5711 | 11.38 |
When a bank worker (Jeff Perry) casually shoots a customer to death and wounds others, the seemingly mentally unstable man runs rings around an exasperated Kibre in court when he asks to defend himself and exploits his claim of extreme emotional distress due to the tragic death of his son. Kibre and Gaffney must regain their footing before the jury through old-fashioned detective work, which reveals critical holes in the murderer's persistent claim that he has been victimized by everyone. Carey Lowell guest-stars as Judge Jamie Ross.
| 8 | "Skeleton" | David Platt | David Wilcox | April 15, 2005 | E5716 | 13.19 |
Kibre prosecutes an elusive career criminal Shane Lucas (Ritchie Coster) for the murder of a sleazy ex-cop and the shooting of Detective Ed Green. As Kibre's office works with Detective Joe Fontana (Dennis Farina), they discover their prime suspect might also be a producer of "snuff" pornography. When a sting goes bad and a shocking courtroom development cuts the legs from under her case, Kibre's career teeters on finding why the shootings were committed in the first place. This episode concludes a story that begins on Law & Order in "Tombstone". Dennis Farina (Detective Fontana), Jesse L. Martin (Detective Ed Green), S. Epatha Merkerson (Lt. Anita Van Buren), Sam Waterston (EADA Jack McCoy) and Richard Belzer (Detective John Munch) guest star.
| 9 | "The Line" | Richard Pearce | Tony Phelan & Joan Rater | April 22, 2005 | E5714 | 10.08 |
Against good advice, Kibre goes full out to retry a convicted multiple murderer (Gabriel Casseus), who is released due to falsified evidence, but she is hardly helped by frightened and hinky witnesses while the manipulative suspect seems to counter her every move with his pricey lawyers. As her fragile case continues to dissolve, Kibre hopes for a break from a witness or forensic evidence, and alienates Gaffney when she ponders contorting ethical rules, if necessary.
| 10 | "Blue Wall" | Joe Ann Fogle | Rick Eid | April 29, 2005 | E5713 | 9.59 |
Kibre is handed a political bombshell when she is asked to prosecute two police officers (Domenick Lombardozzi and Mike Colter) for their murky roles in the murder of a gay prisoner who was fatally sodomized with a police nightstick; she clashes with Detective Chris Ravell (Scott Cohen), who confronts the "blue wall" in his search for truth. Under federal pressure for a conviction, the conscience-stricken detective causes more problems when he tries to protect one of the cops and his young family by withholding vital evidence.
| 11 | "Day" | Caleb Deschanel | Story by : Chris Levinson and Amanda Green; Teleplay by : Chris Levinson | May 3, 2005 | E5715 | 18.70 |
ADA Kibre works to prosecute a serial rapist (Alfred Molina), whose trail of victims through the years has been whitewashed by his wealthy and protective mother (Angela Lansbury). Kibre must also overcome witness intimidation, and even sees her crucial DNA evidence tossed out, but the slippery suspect's lawyer has yet another surprise up his sleeve. This episode concludes a crossover with Law & Order: Special Victims Unit that begins on "Night". Mariska Hargitay (Olivia Benson), Christopher Meloni (Elliot Stabler), Diane Neal (Casey Novak), and Tamara Tunie (Melinda Warner) guest star.
| 12 | "Boys Will Be Boys" | Aaron Lipstadt | Rick Eid | May 6, 2005 | E5706 | 9.82 |
Kibre and Gaffney are stymied when a young man (Victor Rasuk) confesses to killing a transvestite upon discovering that the "she" was a "he", just before the suspect's controlling father (Giancarlo Esposito) also admits that he pummeled the victim to death in self-defense. Besides being whipsawed between two divergent confessions, the suspicious assistant DAs cannot seem to turn one against the other, prompting a determined Kibre to reach into her legal bag of tricks to force the issue in court.
| 13 | "Eros in the Upper Eighties" | Joe Ann Fogle | Chris Levinson | January 21, 2006 | E5705 | N/A |
A doorman at a high-end Upper Eastside building saves a tenant's life when he pulls a homeless man off her, but kills him in the process, and what appears to be an act of a good Samaritan is actually much more complicated.

== Ratings ==
| Season | Episodes | Timeslot (EST) | Season premiere | Season finale | TV season | Ranking | Viewers (in millions) |
|---|---|---|---|---|---|---|---|
| 1 | 13 | Fridays 10:00 p.m. | March 3, 2005 | January 21, 2006 | 2004–2005 | #37 | 10.73 |

== Cancellation ==
NBC announced on May 16, 2005, that Trial by Jury would not be returning for the 2005–2006 fall television season. The rival CBS procedural Numbers debuted in the midseason in late January 2005 and consistently beat NBC's Medical Investigation in the ratings, sending the latter show into hiatus and eventual cancellation, freeing up the time slot for Law & Order: Trial by Jury. Despite Trial by Jury's pedigree, Numbers' ratings remained strong, often beating Trial by Jury in both overall and key demographic ratings.

In an October 2005 interview with the Associated Press, Wolf stated that NBC had assured him Trial by Jury would return for the fall of 2005, but had "blindsided" him by canceling it instead. Though still having reasonable ratings that could have given the series a second season, the main reason for the cancellation according to Kevin Reilly, NBC's brand-new president of entertainment at the time, was due to the networks acquisition of Sunday Night Football for what was coming in the 2005–2006 season, which took away programming space for NBC. As Reilly would state, "Now that we have football [on Sundays, beginning in 2006], we only have five nights of entertainment programming. When we had six nights, we could accommodate four Law & Orders."

Trial by Jury was the first series of the Law & Order franchise to be canceled. The sets were reused by a series Wolf produced for NBC entitled Conviction which premiered Friday, March 3, 2006, lasting only one season before cancellation. The network Court TV (now TruTV) re-aired the entire series, including the episode "Eros in the Upper Eighties", which never aired on NBC before the series was canceled. TNT has aired the episode "Skeleton" on occasion, as the conclusion to the original series episode "Tombstone". The opening track and some of the intro sequences from Trial by Jury would be re-used in Law & Order: Criminal Intent after their show was transferred to the USA Network and remained until its own cancellation in 2011.

== Home media ==
On April 25, 2006, Universal Studios Home Entertainment released Law & Order: Trial by Jury – The Complete Series on DVD in Region 1. In Australia, Shock Entertainment released Law & Order: Trial by Jury – The Complete Series on DVD in Region 4 on March 7, 2018.

| Title | Ep# | Release dates | | Additional information |
| Title | Ep# | Region 1 | Region 4 | |
| Law & Order: Trial by Jury – The Complete Series | 13 | April 25, 2006 | | Cross-over episode "Night" from Law & Order: Special Victims Unit; Deleted Scenes; "A Different Look at Law & Order"; Presented in Cropped Full Frame 1.33:1; English Dolby Digital 5.1 Surround |
| Law & Order: Trial by Jury – The Complete Series | 13 | | March 7, 2018 | Presented in OAR Widescreen 1.78:1; English Dolby Digital 2.0 Stereo Surround |
