= Serena Southerlyn =

Character in the TV series Law & Order

- Law & Order character
- First appearance: "Who Let The Dogs Out?"
- Last appearance: "Ain't No Love"
- Portrayed by: Elisabeth Röhm

In-universe information
- Seasons: 12, 13, 14, 15

Serena Southerlyn is a fictional character portrayed by Elisabeth Röhm on the long-running NBC drama series Law & Order. She appeared in 85 episodes.

== Character overview ==
Southerlyn joins the District Attorney's office in the 2001 episode "Who Let The Dogs Out?" as an assistant district attorney, replacing Abbie Carmichael (Angie Harmon). She worked under District Attorneys Nora Lewin (Dianne Wiest) and Arthur Branch (Fred Thompson) and Executive Assistant District Attorney Jack McCoy (Sam Waterston). She was the second longest serving junior ADA in the history of the series, having served three complete seasons and half of a fourth.

Southerlyn often disagrees with McCoy over their trial strategies in cases where she sees the defendant's crime as a by-product of social circumstances, such as homelessness or racism. She has an especially troubled relationship with Branch, a conservative who replaced Lewin as District Attorney in 2002. There is some nuance in her political outlook, however; she takes a hardline stance against illegal immigration, and sees the Miranda Warning as "trite" and a "hollow formality".

== Notable conflicts in the series ==
In 2002, Southerlyn is brought before the New York Supreme Court, Appellate Division's Disciplinary Committee after promising to get legal help for a murder suspect who had taken hostages, to get him to release his prisoners. The man had a knife to a woman's throat and demanded a lawyer. Southerlyn, who happened to be in the area, volunteered to enter the store where the holdup was taking place, to negotiate the hostage's release. Since the man had asked for a lawyer, the committee attempts to paint Southerlyn's actions as fraudulent, since she was supposedly representing herself as his lawyer (which she denies), when she was in fact a district attorney. McCoy, who had been brought before the committee four years earlier, represents her. She is reprimanded, but keeps her law license.

Southerlyn is a graduate of (the fictional) Hudson University law school. In a 2003 trial, opposing counsel is her old professor of criminal law. He goads her by saying he remembers her as an A− student; she responds that she got an A, before adding that she never approved of his clients.

In several episodes, Southerlyn is portrayed as opposing the death penalty, which often puts her in a difficult ethical position when working with McCoy and Branch, who both support capital punishment.

== Departure and sexuality ==
Röhm left the show in the middle of the fifteenth season, and made her last appearance in the January 2005 episode "Ain't No Love". She was replaced by Alexandra Borgia (Annie Parisse).

Her departure was noteworthy due to a surprising conversation between Southerlyn and Branch in the very last scene of the episode. At the close of the show, Branch fires Southerlyn because he feels she is too sympathetic toward defendants, and that her emotions get in the way of looking at the facts. A stunned Southerlyn pauses for a moment, then asks, "Is this because I'm a lesbian?" Startled by the question, Branch protests, "No. Of course not. No." Her final line is "Good.... Good." This is the first and only instance that Southerlyn's homosexuality was ever explicitly mentioned, although there had been subtle hints in earlier episodes.

In the 2001 episode "3 Dawg Night", Southerlyn mentions she would often hold her boyfriend's cell phone in her purse while at a club.

In the 2002 episode "Girl Most Likely", while discussing a gay murder suspect, she notes, "Coming out's got to be a pretty tough thing to do, no matter how understanding your parents are." In the 2004 episode "Gov Love," she is uncomfortable with a case in which McCoy successfully seeks to have same-sex marriage declared illegal in New York in order to get testimony from a gay defendant's spouse. Southerlyn had objected to this and refused to assist McCoy, but her sexual orientation was never mentioned. She mentions in another episode that she dated a male college student while she was still in high school and that he is now a New York State Senator.

The decision to announce Southerlyn's homosexuality only as the character left the show was widely denounced both by fans and critics. Slate's Dana Stevens called the line "a cheap stunt", as did USA Today's Robert Bianco and numerous fans. The media director for the Gay & Lesbian Alliance Against Defamation (GLAAD) stated to Chicago Tribune television critic Maureen Ryan, "For a show that usually employs gay and lesbian characters as sensational plot devices, it's really disappointing to have one of the leads come out five seconds before she exits the show." Ryan also cited as "typical" a fan comment from Universal Television's fan forum that read, "They have never discussed her sexuality on the show before and all of a sudden, she's gay in her last two lines? Terrible writing decision." Tim Goodman of the San Francisco Chronicle joined those calling the move a "cheap stunt", adding, "but here's why it didn't work: Anyone who knows anything about gay people knows that no lesbian could ever be that bad of an actress." Diane Holloway of the Austin American-Statesman was one of many critics who chose to answer Southerlyn's on-screen question, while citing her as third runner-up for a list of "the most annoying actors on television".

Gone and almost forgotten, but destined to live on in endless reruns on TNT. This wide-eyed 'actress' with the tedious monotone nearly ruined one of my favorite series, stumbling through cue cards and generally not acting as Assistant District Attorney Southerlyn for four seasons. Her final line upon getting fired was the only memorable one of her career: 'Is it because I'm a lesbian?' No, Ms. Rohm. It's because you have no talent.

—

Critic Kevin Thompson of the Palm Beach Post similarly replied, "No, it's because you're a robotic actress."

Series creator Dick Wolf later explained at the Television Critics Association press tour that he had consulted Röhm before scripting the scene — the only Wolf-authored scene in the installment — saying, "Do you want to go out with a bang or a whimper?" He characterized the scene as "unabashedly a water-cooler moment." "And the fact that we're discussing it shows that I think it worked as a water-cooler moment." Wolf also noted the effectiveness of the device by reporting that the show's main online chat room "crashed 15 minutes after the show was over," although critic Alan Pergament joked in his column that the response came not because viewers approved, but "because many fans thought the out-of-left field ending was a crime."

== Critical response ==
TV Guide called Röhm "arguably the most inept cast member" in the series' first 18 years, with Ben Katner writing "we are dancing in the streets" upon her departure. Dusin Rowles of Pajiba described Röhm as a "disaster" and a "catastrophe". Entertainment Weekly called Röhm's performance and character "wooden". AfterEllen.com reported that Southerlyn was "one of the show's more disliked characters" due to her "cold and robotic" portrayal.

== Credits ==
Rohm is credited in a total of 85 episodes of Law & Order. This makes her character, Serena Southerlyn, tied with Connie Rubirosa (portrayed by Alana de la Garza) as the longest-serving assistant district attorney in the original Law & Order series in terms of the number of episodes featured (not including crossovers on other shows).

Seasons	Years	Episodes																							
Seasons	Years	1	2	3	4	5	6	7	8	9	10	11	12	13	14	15	16	17	18	19	20	21	22	23	24
12	2001–02																								
13	2002–03																								
14	2003–04																								
15	2004–05																								
Seasons	Years	1	2	3	4	5	6	7	8	9	10	11	12	13	14	15	16	17	18	19	20	21	22	23	24
Seasons	Years	Episodes																							

Regular cast

×	Regular cast + no appearance

Recurring cast

No credit + no appearance
