= Crimes of the Past =

- Directed by: Garrett Bennett
- Written by: Steve Edmiston
- Produced by: Lenville O'Donnell; Victor Kepler; Steve Edmiston
- Starring: David Rasche; Elisabeth Röhm; Chad Lindberg; Eric Roberts
- Cinematography: Julio Riberyo
- Edited by: Bryan Gunnar Cole; Liza McDonald
- Music by: Kyle Porter
- Distributed by: MarVista Entertainment
- Release date: June 10, 2009 (SIFF)
- Country: United States
- Language: English

Crimes of the Past, also known as The Spy and the Sparrow, is a 2009 thriller film starring David Rasche, Elisabeth Röhm, and Eric Roberts.

== Plot ==
Retired CIA Agent Thomas Sparrow (David Rasche) retires and returns home to Seattle to try to reconnect with his long-lost daughter (Elisabeth Röhm), but a former colleague (Eric Roberts) complicates things by coming back into Sparrow's life.

== Cast ==
- David Rasche as Thomas Sparrow
- Elisabeth Röhm as Josephine Sparrow
- Eric Roberts as Robert Byrne
- Chad Lindberg as Kidd Bangs
- John Aylward as Clay Covington
- Cynthia Geary as Agent Cotton
- Olivia Thomas as Erin Baker
- Charles Leggett as Salesman

== Production ==
Filming took place in Seattle, Washington from February 16 - March 14, 2007, and opened up to mixed to reviews. Stephen Farber of the Hollywood Reporter said "While it lacks major marquee names and doesn't quite hit a home run, it is an engrossing, superbly acted movie that will please audiences who manage to catch it."

== Distribution ==
The film was acquired for distribution by MarVista Entertainment, and premiered on Lifetime Movie Network February 12, 2011.
