= Lennie Briscoe =

Law & Order character

Det. Lennie Briscoe
- 'Law & Order' character
- First appearance: "Point of View" (L&O)
- Last appearance: "41 Shots" (TBJ)
- Portrayed by: Jerry Orbach

In-universe information
- Family: Unnamed brother
- Spouse: Two ex-wives
- Children: Julia Briscoe (daughter); Cathy Briscoe (daughter; deceased)
- Relatives: Harry (uncle; deceased); Ken Briscoe (nephew); At least two unnamed grandchildren
- Partner: John Flynn; Mike Logan; Rey Curtis; Ed Green; Hector Salazar
- Seasons: 3, 4, 5, 6, 7, 8, 9, 10, 11, 12, 13, 14 (L&O); 1 (TBJ)

Leonard W. Briscoe is a fictional character on NBC's long-running police procedural and legal drama television series Law & Order. He was created by Walon Green and René Balcer and portrayed by Jerry Orbach. He was featured on the show for 12 complete seasons and part of another, from 1992 to 2004, making him one of the longest-serving main characters in the series' history, as well as the longest-serving police detective on the show. He also appeared in three Law & Order spin-offs and was part of the original cast of Law & Order: Trial by Jury, appearing in the first two episodes prior to his death. He appears in 282 episodes across the Law & Order franchise (273 episodes of Law & Order, two episodes of Law & Order: Trial by Jury, one episode of Law & Order: Criminal Intent, three episodes of Law & Order: Special Victims Unit, and three crossover episodes of Homicide: Life on the Street), the TV movie Exiled and the Law & Order video games Law & Order: Dead on the Money, Law & Order: Double or Nothing, Law & Order: Justice Is Served and Law & Order: Legacies.

Prior to Orbach's recurring role, he played lawyer Frank Lehrman on Season 2 Episode 2, "The Wages of Love". Orbach's performance as Briscoe on the New York–based series was so popular that it resulted in Orbach being declared a "Living Landmark" by the New York Landmarks Conservancy, in a joint recognition with fellow longtime series cast member Sam Waterston, who portrayed prosecutor Jack McCoy on Law & Order for 19 seasons.

== Law & Order universe ==
Lennie Briscoe is introduced in the ninth episode of the third season, "Point of View", as the new senior detective in the New York City Police Department's 27th Detective Squad in the 27th Police Precinct's station house. In the episode "Virus", his birthday is given as January 2, 1940. His commanding officer during his first season on the show is Capt. Donald Cragen (Dann Florek); a year later, Lt. Anita Van Buren (S. Epatha Merkerson) takes over the 27th Precinct. He was previously assigned as a detective in the 116th Squad in Queens.

Briscoe joins the squad after Det. Mike Logan's (Chris Noth) partner, Sgt. Phil Cerreta (Paul Sorvino), is shot by a black market arms dealer and transfers to a desk job in another precinct.

After Logan is transferred to Staten Island in 1995, Det. Rey Curtis (Benjamin Bratt) becomes Briscoe's partner. Four years later, Curtis goes into early retirement to take care of his multiple sclerosis–stricken wife, and he is replaced by Det. Ed Green (Jesse L. Martin) in 1999.

== Character biography ==
Born on January 2, 1940, Lennie Briscoe grew up in the Meatpacking District of Manhattan. He has a brother. As a child, he attended P.S. 21, as his father had before him, as well as P.S. 189. He attended college at the City College of New York. A veteran of two failed marriages, Briscoe has two daughters by his first wife, the elder Julia and the younger Cathy (Jennifer Bill), and a nephew, Det. Ken Briscoe (played by Orbach's real-life son, Chris). Cathy was born on June 23, 1971, and murdered on March 4, 1998. By 2002, Briscoe has at least two grandchildren.

Prior to working for the NYPD, Briscoe worked at his uncle's liquor store.

Briscoe began working in the NYPD homicide department in 1981. He carries a Smith & Wesson Model 36 revolver as his service weapon.

He is a recovering alcoholic, admitting he spent "20 years in a bottle.” He often makes references to being a "friend of Bill W.", which is a reference to his having attended Alcoholics Anonymous. In the 1996 episode "Aftershock", after witnessing an execution from a case that he helped investigate, he falls off the wagon with disastrous results; Assistant District Attorney Claire Kincaid (Jill Hennessy) is struck and killed by a drunk driver while driving him home from a bar. He feels responsible for her death, and remains sober for the rest of his life.

His drinking harmed his family; he was often absent from his daughters' lives while they were growing up, and they have distant, fractious relationships with him as adults. Briscoe blames himself, especially when Cathy, a methamphetamine addict, is murdered by a drug dealer named Danny Jones (Johnny Dapolito) after she testifies against Jones in court. However, he finds closure when Jones dies from a heroin overdose. It is implied that Briscoe considered having Jones killed. One of Briscoe's former snitches had offered to kill Jones if Briscoe could get his charges reduced. Briscoe is later seen talking to the arresting officer about the snitch, but it is never confirmed if Briscoe did him the favor. This episode, which broke Dick Wolf's "self-imposed rule" against delving into the private lives of the characters, was brought about by Orbach's efforts to have Wolf provide the character with an "Emmy moment". Previously, when the firing of Chris Noth from the series had been announced, Orbach proposed that Noth's character be killed off, to allow a scene of "a sobbing Briscoe... cradling the dead body of Mike Logan in his arms"; Wolf declined this request, thus making it possible for Logan to return as a character later in the franchise. Wolf later commissioned the episode with Cathy's death to mollify Orbach.

Briscoe is Jewish on his father's side. While he was raised Catholic, he occasionally attends Jewish services as a gesture to his second ex-wife. His father served in the United States Army during World War II and helped to liberate the Dachau concentration camp in Germany. Briscoe's father suffered from Alzheimer's, and is dead by 1994. Briscoe did not get along with his father, and once described him as a "schmuck". Nevertheless, he took several days off when his father died.

He mentions having voted for Al Gore in the 2000 U.S. presidential election. He supported the 2003-era Iraq War. He plays golf, and he is also revealed to be a skilled pool player, in one episode defeating an opponent in eight-ball after the break without giving up a turn.

== Character highlights ==
Briscoe is one of many characters on the show to have served in the U.S. military; he was at one point a corporal in the United States Army. On several occasions he referred to his service in the Vietnam War. After leaving the Army, Briscoe joined the NYPD in the 29th Precinct in Manhattan and walked a beat there with stops at the 31st and 33rd Precincts, also in Manhattan, and the 110th and 116th Precincts in Queens, at some point reaching the rank of detective. In the 1999 episode "Marathon", he is revealed to have spent three years in the Anti-Crime Unit. Briscoe's detective shield number is 8220.

Briscoe typically has a wisecrack or joke about the victim or circumstances of death at the close of the opening scene, usually in a deadpan delivery. He likes music, but mostly music that was popular in his youth; in one episode, Curtis chides his musical taste for stopping with Bobby Darin. Briscoe used to read Langston Hughes back when he was a beatnik "for about five minutes" because "it used to work pretty good on Jewish girls from Riverdale."

Many of Briscoe's former partners and colleagues outside the series (offscreen before Briscoe joined the 27th Precinct) have been or ended up becoming corrupt. In the 1993 episode "Jurisdiction", Detective Brian Torelli (Dan Hedaya) forces a confession from a mentally handicapped man; at the end of the episode, Briscoe is present when Internal Affairs arrests Torelli for suborning perjury and obstruction of justice.

In the 1994 episode "Kids", the son of Briscoe's former colleague Detective Ted Parker (Robert Hogan) is arrested for shooting another teenager. Parker and Briscoe have a private conversation during which Parker, speaking hypothetically, essentially relays to Briscoe that his son killed the other boy in self-defense. At the end of the episode, Parker tacitly acknowledges to Briscoe that Parker used contacts in Parker's old precinct to engineer the shooting death of a key prosecution witness, resulting in a mistrial.

Another of Briscoe's former partners, Detective John Flynn (Kevin Conway), falsely implicates Briscoe in the 1996 episode "Corruption" for taking seized drugs from the 116th Precinct evidence room (given to him by Flynn) during their stint there several years before. Flynn makes this allegation partly to throw off the Hellman Commission, which had been convened to investigate police corruption, including the questionable shooting death of a suspect by Flynn himself at the start of the episode, and partly as revenge against Curtis, who refused to falsely defend Flynn. Briscoe, however, has an alibi—he was having an affair with Officer Betty Abrams (Caroline Kava), a married woman. Against Briscoe's wishes, Abrams testifies before the commission to exonerate him. Because of the affair, however, the commissioners question Abrams' credibility. Briscoe finally gets the truth out of Flynn with a hidden wire tap, but Flynn commits suicide before he can be further prosecuted. Briscoe is ultimately cleared.

In the 2000 episode "Amends", Briscoe has another reunion with one of his former colleagues that opens up some ugly history. While investigating a 20-year-old cold case, Briscoe learns that one of his former colleagues, Tommy Brannigan (Brad Sullivan), had been convinced by his superior to accept promotion to detective first grade in exchange for letting a wealthy murder suspect go free. The now-retired Brannigan ultimately confesses in court, which helps Executive ADA Jack McCoy (Sam Waterston) convict the suspect in the long-cold case. Briscoe and Brannigan reconcile afterwards.

Some decisions in Briscoe's career are controversial. In the 1998 episode "Stalker", a key piece of evidence against a stalker accused of murdering a woman is ruled inadmissible because the police concluded that the victim had earlier lied about previously being attacked by the stalker, thereby undermining her own credibility. However, after the victim is found murdered, Briscoe approaches McCoy and tells him that he now believes that the victim did not lie to the police concerning the stalker's earlier attacks. Briscoe testifies for the prosecution to this effect, resulting in the evidence being readmitted. In addition, Curtis is called as a defense witness so he can state his belief that the original police report was correct; McCoy is forced to attack his credibility in order to salvage the case. The stalker is convicted, and Briscoe and Curtis reconcile afterward.

Shortly after Ed Green is assigned as Briscoe's partner, the two nearly come to blows during a particularly difficult investigation of a robbery-homicide in the 1999 episode "Marathon". Their primary suspect confesses as he is being arrested, but because Briscoe is the only officer within earshot, Green, Van Buren, and McCoy are placed in a difficult position with regard to the confession. Again, Briscoe is eventually vindicated, and Green and he work to rebuild their professional rapport.

Briscoe retires in the 2004 episode "C.O.D." after 12 years at the 27th Precinct and more than 30 years in the NYPD. His replacement is Det. Joe Fontana (Dennis Farina).

Briscoe died at some point between 2004 and 2005 (Orbach himself died on December 28, 2004). Although not addressed directly on the main series until 2008, his death was implied in 2005 and confirmed in 2007 on an episode of Law & Order: Criminal Intent. The three official mentions of his death were made by each of his three junior partners on the series: Mike Logan, Rey Curtis and Ed Green.

== Spin-offs ==
On the first season of Law & Order: Special Victims Unit, Briscoe makes three guest appearances assisting his old boss, Captain Cragen (one of these reunions involves re-opening a serial murder case that Briscoe and Logan had failed to solve several years earlier in the 1994 episode "Mayhem"). Briscoe also makes a guest appearance in the Law & Order: Criminal Intent episode "Poison" with his partner Ed Green, in which he assists the Major Case Squad on a similar case. He also appeared in three episodes of Homicide: Life on the Street.

Soon after his retirement, Briscoe joins Law & Order: Trial by Jury, having accepted an appointment as an investigator in the office of New York County District Attorney Arthur Branch (Fred Thompson), with partner Inv. Hector Salazar (Kirk Acevedo). He appears in only the first two episodes of this series - "The Abominable Showman" and "41 Shots".

=== Appearances ===
- Homicide: Life on the Street
  - Season Four
    - Episode 12: "For God and Country"
  - Season Six
    - Episode 5: "Baby, It's You"
  - Season Seven
    - Episode 15: "Sideshow"
- Law & Order: Special Victims Unit
  - Season One
    - Episode 3: "...Or Just Look Like One"
    - Episode 4: "Hysteria"
    - Episode 15: "Entitled"
- Law & Order: Criminal Intent
  - Season One
    - Episode 7: "Poison"

== Death and acknowledgements ==
In 2005, the Lennie Briscoe character was written out after the second episode of Trial By Jury, coinciding with Orbach's death on December 28, 2004, from prostate cancer. The character's departure from the show was originally to be in the episode "Baby Boom" in which members of the DA's office attend a memorial service for him. This scene was in fact filmed but was not included in the aired episode. Part of the scene is included in the behind-the-scenes footage of the show's DVD set. Briscoe's absence past the second episode is never acknowledged, and he is quickly replaced by Detective Chris Ravell (Scott Cohen).

His former partners each mention his death on Law & Order or one of its spinoffs. In the 2007 Criminal Intent episode "Renewal", Mike Logan mentions that Briscoe has died, but that he still sees him alive in his dreams. In the 2008 Law & Order episode "Burn Card", Ed Green says that his gambling addiction relapsed briefly after Briscoe died. In the 2009 Law & Order episode "Fed", Rey Curtis returns to New York to bury his wife Deborah, who had finally succumbed to complications related to multiple sclerosis. He reveals to Van Buren that he had spoken with Briscoe a few days before his death, and that he was his old wisecracking self to the end.

== Credits ==
Seasons	Years	Episodes																							
Seasons	Years	1	2	3	4	5	6	7	8	9	10	11	12	13	14	15	16	17	18	19	20	21	22	23	24
3	1992–93																								
4	1993–94																								
5	1994–95																								
6	1995–96																								
7	1996–97																								
8	1997–98																								
9	1998–99																								
10	1999–2000																								
11	2000–01																								
12	2001–02																								
13	2002–03																								
14	2003–04																								
Seasons	Years	1	2	3	4	5	6	7	8	9	10	11	12	13	14	15	16	17	18	19	20	21	22	23	24
Seasons	Years	Episodes																							

Not cast; no appearance

Regular cast

No episode

Law & Order: Trial by Jury

Seasons	Years	Episodes												
Seasons	Years	1	2	3	4	5	6	7	8	9	10	11	12	13
1	2005–06													
Seasons	Years	1	2	3	4	5	6	7	8	9	10	11	12	13
Seasons	Years	Episodes												

Regular cast

No credit + no appearance

== Reception ==
Following the end of Orbach's run as Briscoe in 2004, the character was praised in a piece in Today as "the quintessential television detective", a character who "didn't feel the need to dominate every scene; he just slyly stole them, with the perfect quip and perpetually raised eyebrows".

- Lennie Briscoe was voted the 30th-greatest television show character of all time by Bravo TV.
- Lennie Briscoe was Law & Order's third-greatest detective on the Hallmark Channel poll in 2010, beaten only by Special Victims Unit's Detective Olivia Benson (Mariska Hargitay), who came in second, and Criminal Intent's Detective Robert Goren (Vincent D'Onofrio), who won the poll.
- Lennie Briscoe was ranked number 9 on Sleuth Channel's poll of America's Top Sleuths, between Sherlock Holmes at number 10 and Gil Grissom of CSI at number 8.
- Lennie Briscoe was named one of TV's Smartest Detectives by AOL TV.
- Lennie Briscoe was ranked 15th on TV Guide's list of the 25 greatest TV detectives.
