= Cyrus Farmer =

American actor

Cyrus Farmer is an American actor known for his work in film and television, particularly in crime dramas and thrillers.

== Early life and career ==
Farmer was born on 23 April 1968 in the United States. He began his acting career in the mid-1990s with roles in television series including The Sinbad Show and M.A.N.T.I.S.

== Career ==
=== Film ===
Farmer's early film work included roles in City of Industry (1997), Crash Dive (1996) and One Tough Bastard (1996). He appeared in three notable films during the 2000s: the psychological thriller Don't Say a Word (2001) starring Michael Douglas and Brittany Murphy, City by the Sea (2002) where he played Carl opposite Robert De Niro and James Franco, and Notorious (2009), in which he portrayed Selwyn in the biographical drama about rapper The Notorious B.I.G.

His other film credits include Held Up (2010), Sunken City (2015), Flock of Four (2018), I Hate the Man in My Basement (2020) and Wicked (2021).

=== Television ===
==== HBO productions ====
Farmer secured recurring roles in several HBO productions. He appeared in the 2000 miniseries The Corner and portrayed Officer Adrian Johnson in 15 episodes of the prison drama Oz from 2000 to 2003.

In 2006, Farmer appeared in Season 4 of The Wire as Devar Manigault, a recurring character whose storyline was central to the arc involving Michael Lee.

==== Other television work ====
Farmer has maintained a prolific career with appearances across numerous crime procedurals and dramas. His television credits include Guiding Light (1993), All My Children (1994), The Marshal (1995), Brooklyn South (1997), The Practice (1997), The Job (2001), The Jury (1997 & 2004), NYPD Blue (1997) as Ray Harvey in episode "Tom and Geri" (S04E13) and later as the villainous Craig Woodruff in season 11 (2004), 3 LBS (2006), Law & Order (2007), The Unit (2008), In Plain Sight (2009), Raising the Bar (2009), Detroit 1-8-7 (2010), CSI: Miami (2011), NCIS: Los Angeles (2011), CSI: Crime Scene Investigation (2012), The Fosters (2013), CSI: Cyber (2015), Castle (2016), Chicago P.D. (2016, 2023) as Reverend Pembelton and Dr. Michael Abani, Blue Bloods (2017) as Reggie Wilson, Bull (2017), Partner Track (2022) and The Blacklist (2022).

== Filmography ==
=== Film ===
Year	Title	Role	Notes
1996	Crash Dive		
1996	One Tough Bastard		
1997	City of Industry		
2001	Don't Say a Word		
2002	City by the Sea	Carl	
2009	Notorious	Selwyn	
2010	Held Up		
2015	Sunken City		
2017	Flock of Four		
2020	I Hate the Man in My Basement		
2021	Wicked	David	

=== Television ===
Year	Title	Role	Notes
1993	Guiding Light		
1993–1994	The Sinbad Show		
1994	All My Children		
1994–1995	M.A.N.T.I.S.		
1995	The Marshal		
1997	Brooklyn South		
1997	The Practice		
2000	The Corner		Miniseries
2000–2003	Oz	Officer Adrian Johnson	15 episodes
2001	The Job		
2004	The Jury		
1997-2004	NYPD Blue	Ray Harvey/Craig Woodruff	Multiple episodes
2006	3 LBS		
2006	The Wire	Devar Manigault	Season 4
2007	Law & Order		
2008	The Unit		
2009	In Plain Sight		
2009	Raising the Bar		
2010	Detroit 1-8-7		
2011	CSI: Miami		
2011	NCIS: Los Angeles		
2012	CSI: Crime Scene Investigation		
2013	The Fosters		
2015	CSI: Cyber		
2016	Castle		
2016	Chicago P.D.	Reverend Pembelton	
2017	Blue Bloods	Reggie Wilson	
2017	Bull		
2022	Partner Track		
2022	The Blacklist		
2023	Chicago P.D.	Dr. Michael Abani	
