= Reid Scott =

Reid Scott may refer to:

- Reid Scott (politician) (1926–2016), Canadian politician
- Reid Scott (actor) (born 1977), American actor
