= Elisabeth Röhm =

American-German actress

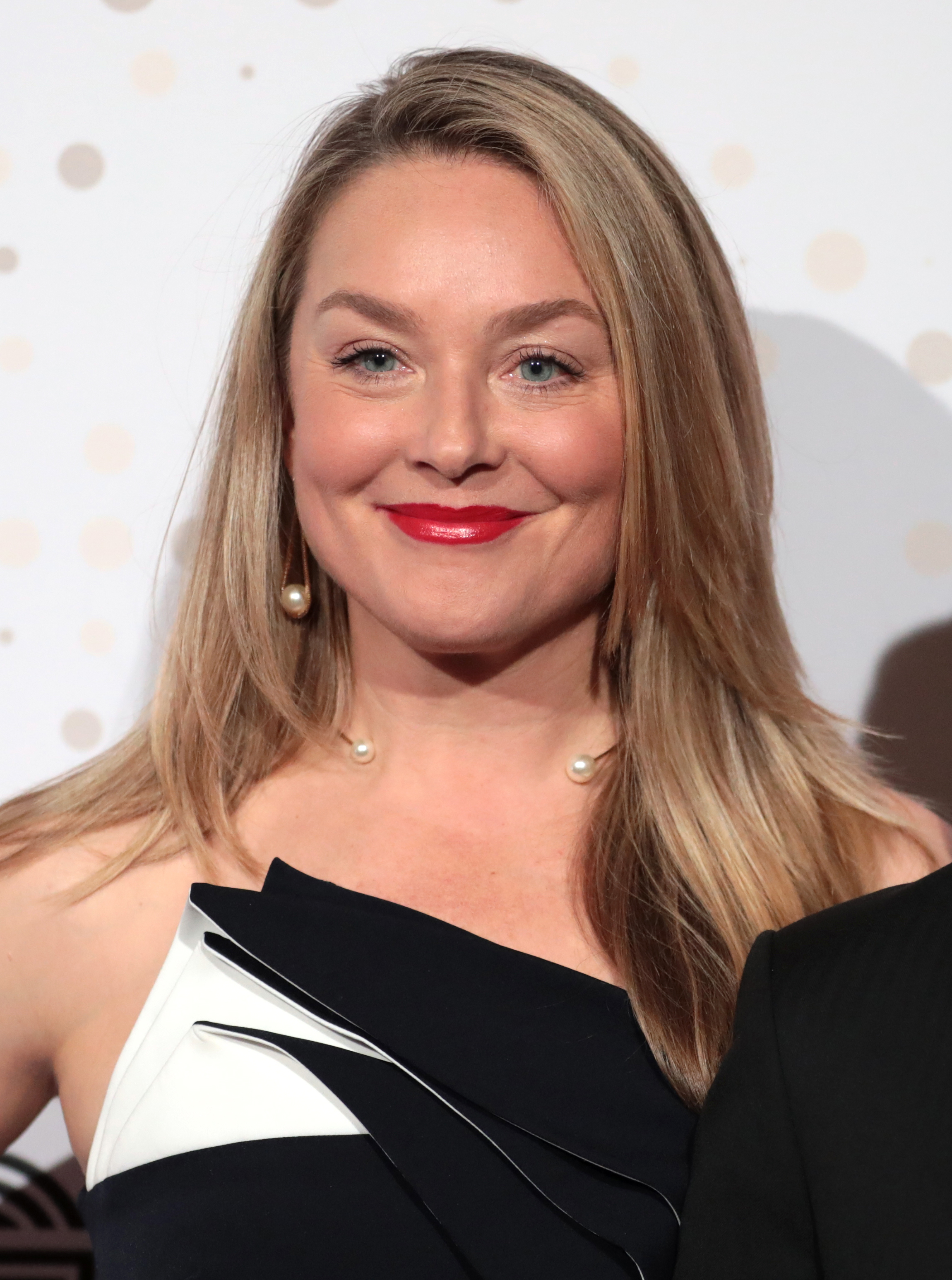
- Röhm in 2023
- Born: April 28, 1973 (age 53); Düsseldorf, West Germany
- Other name: Elisabeth Rohm
- Education: Sarah Lawrence College
- Occupations: Actress, director
- Years active: 1997–present
- Spouses: Ron Anthony Wooster (m. 2008; div. 2014) Peter Glatzer (m. 2021)
- Children: 1

Elisabeth Röhm (/reɪm/ "Rame" or /rɛm/ "rem"; German: [ˈʁøːm]; born April 28, 1973) is an American television and film actress and director. She is best known for playing Kate Lockley in the television series Angel from 1999 to 2001 and Serena Southerlyn in the television series Law & Order from 2001 to 2005.

She has also appeared in films such as Miss Congeniality 2: Armed and Fabulous (2005), American Hustle (2013), Joy (2015), Seduced (2016), Once Upon a Time in Venice (2017), The Tribes of Palos Verdes (2017) and Bombshell (2019).

Röhm made her directorial debut with the Lifetime film Girl in the Basement (2021).

== Early life ==
Röhm was born on April 28, 1973, in Düsseldorf, West Germany, to Lisa Loverde and Eberhard Röhm. Her father was a German partner at the law firm of Duane Morris LLP New York, and the family moved to New York City before her first birthday. Her mother was an American scriptwriter who once wrote for the TV soap opera Guiding Light. Röhm's parents divorced when she was 8 or 9. Her maternal grandfather was an Italian immigrant.

Röhm attended grades 11–12 at St. Andrew's-Sewanee School, a small private boarding school in Sewanee, Tennessee, and then graduated from Sarah Lawrence College in 1996 with a B.A. in European history.

== Career ==
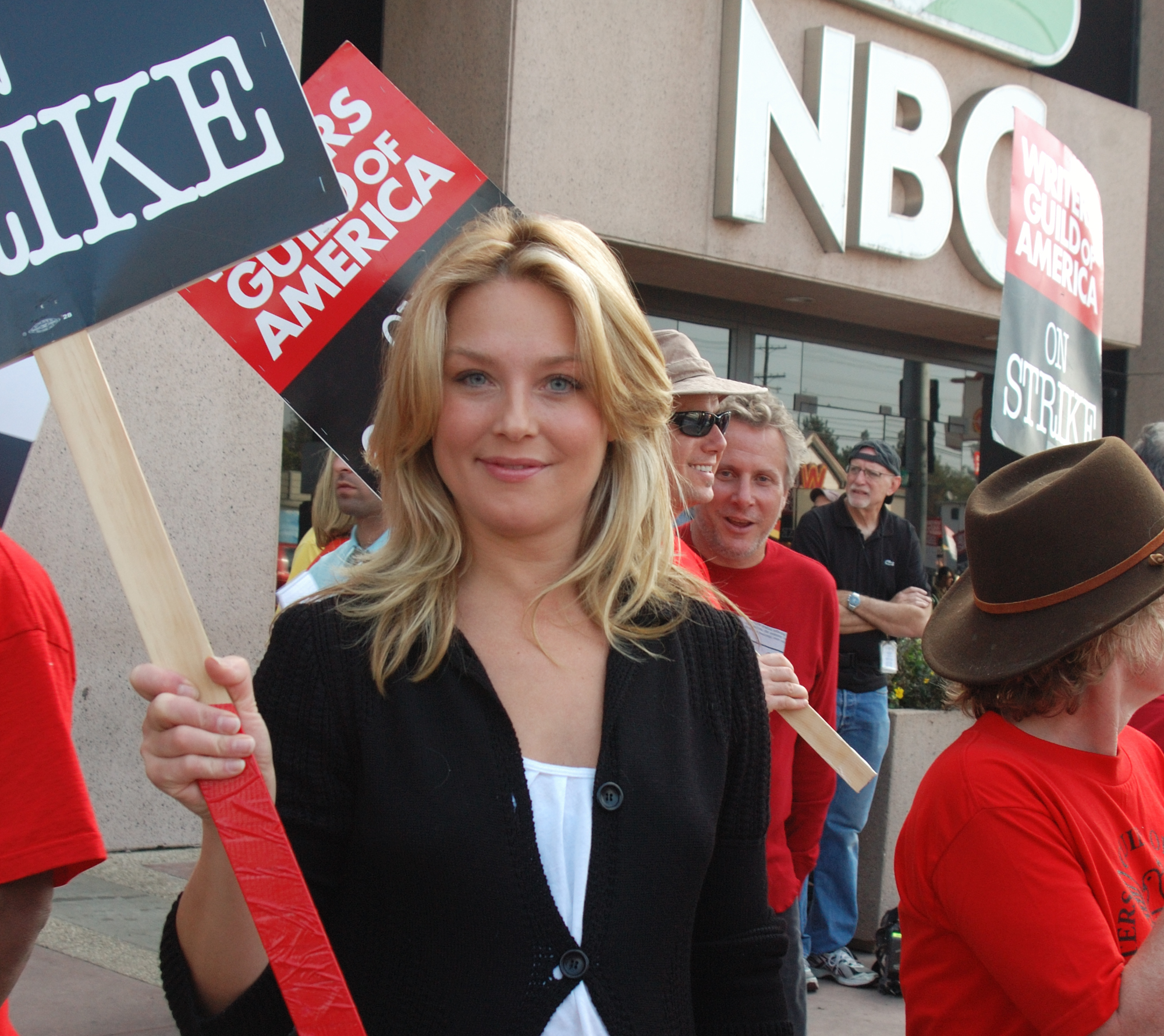
During the 2007–08 Writers Guild of America strike

Röhm received her first TV acting role in 1997, as Dorothy Hayes in the American soap opera One Life to Live. She had a starring role in the 1999 BBC Northern Ireland miniseries Eureka Street, and she then portrayed recurring character Detective Kate Lockley in the first two seasons (1999–2001) of the TV series Angel. While appearing in Angel, Röhm also had a regular role in the only season (2000-01) of the Turner Network Television drama series Bull.

Röhm portrayed regular character Assistant District Attorney Serena Southerlyn through four seasons (2001-05) of the television series Law & Order. She also portrayed deputy DA Amanda Taylor on Stalker. More recently, Röhm has received critical acclaim for her roles in two David O. Russell films, American Hustle (2013) and Joy (2015).

Between 2016 and 2017, Röhm appeared in three episodes of Hawaii Five-0; a Season 14 episode of NCIS; Netflix's Flaked; the film Once Upon a Time in Venice including Bruce Willis, Jason Momoa, John Goodman and Famke Janssen; and the film The Tribes of Palos Verdes starring Jennifer Garner and Alicia Silverstone. She portrayed Martha MacCallum in the 2019 film Bombshell with Nicole Kidman, Charlize Theron and Margot Robbie. She portrayed the mother of Aiden, a drug-addled teen who gets recruited by police to take down a drug czar, in the 2021 film The Runner.

She made her directorial debut with the Lifetime film Girl in the Basement (2021), based on the Fritzl case.

== Personal life ==
Röhm was a longtime avid equestrian, but she gave up professional equestrianism after a 2005 accident that she spoke about in a 2011 episode of the Biography Channel series Celebrity Close Calls. She appeared in several horse-riding scenes with Mark Harmon in an NCIS episode.

Röhm was engaged to director Austin Smithard in 2000. In 2005, Röhm began a relationship with Ron Anthony Wooster. Röhm and Wooster have a daughter born in April 2008. Röhm and Wooster married in October 2008. They divorced in October 2014. In January 2019, Röhm announced her engagement to Judge Jonathan T. Colby. In March 2020, Röhm's publicist revealed that she and Colby were no longer together.

In October 2021, Röhm married Peter Glatzer with her daughter in attendance.

Röhm had a blog on her personal website, where she often wrote about life with her daughter and her then-fiancé. On January 6, 2011, People added Röhm's blog to the "Moms & Babies" section of its website.

== Awards and nominations ==
Röhm, as part of the cast of the TV series Law & Order, was nominated for their 2001 performance, and again for their 2003 performance, for the Screen Actors Guild Award for Outstanding Performance by an Ensemble in a Drama Series. In 2014, Röhm and the rest of the cast won the Screen Actors Guild Award for Outstanding Performance by a Cast in a Motion Picture for their roles in American Hustle.

Röhm was selected for Maxim magazine's "Hot 100" list in 2002.

== Filmography ==
=== Film ===
Year	Title	Role	Notes
1999	Puppet, Love and Mertz	Love	Short film
2004	Push	Samantha	Short film
2005	Miss Congeniality 2: Armed and Fabulous	Agent Janet McKaren	
2007	Ghost Image	Jennifer	
2008	The Kreutzer Sonata	Abigail	
2008	San Saba	Leigh	
2009	The Whole Truth	Angela Masters	
2009	Crimes of the Past	Josephine Sparrow	
2011	Abduction	Lorna Price	
2012	Transit	Robyn	
2013	Officer Down	Alexandra Callahan	
2013	Aftermath	Rebecca Fiorini	
2013	Chlorine	Katherine	
2013	American Hustle	Dolly Polito	
2014	Mega Shark Versus Mecha Shark	Rosie	
2014	Finding Happiness	Juliet Palmer	
2015	Joy	Peggy Mangano	
2016	Everlasting	Jessie's Mom	
2016	Seduced	Caroline Prati	
2016	Love Is All You Need?	Reverend Rachel	
2016	Polaris	Christine	
2017	Once Upon a Time in Venice	Anne Phillips	
2017	Wish Upon	Johanna Shannon	
2017	Scales: Mermaids are Real	Tiffany	
2017	Trafficked	Rachel	
2017	The Tribes of Palos Verdes	Kristen	
2018	Con Man	Lisa Minkow	
2019	Sgt. Will Gardner	Kimmy	
2019	Bombshell	Martha MacCallum	
2021	The Starling	Nancy Rothwelder	
2021	The Runner	Miranda Albers	
2021	Notorious Nick	Stacey Newell	
2022	A Marriage Made in Heaven	Maria Chicopoulos	
2026	Starbright	Caroline	

=== Television ===
Year	Title	Role	Notes
1997–1998	One Life to Live	Dorothy Hayes	Unknown episodes
1998	The Invisible Man		Television film
1998	Fantasy Island	Beautiful Cindy	Episode: "We're Not Worthy"
1999	The '60s	Amanda Stone	Television film
1999	Turks	Marla	Episode: "Live, Love, Lose and Learn"
1999	Eureka Street	Max	Mini-series; 4 episodes
1999–2001	Angel	Kate Lockley	15 episodes
2000–2001	Bull	Alison Jeffers	20 episodes
2001–2005	Law & Order	ADA Serena Southerlyn	Main role (seasons 12–15); 85 Episodes
2005	Briar & Graves	Dr. Laurie Graves	Television film
2005	FBI: Negotiator	Laura Martin	Television film
2006	Amber's Story	Donna Whitson	Television film
2007	Masters of Science Fiction	Lt. Granger	Episode: "The Awakening"
2007	Big Shots	Alex Mason	3 episodes
2008–2013	The Mentalist	Dr. Sophie Miller	2 episodes
2009	90210	Bitsy Epstein	Episode: "To New Beginnings!"
2009	Brooke Harris	Television film	
2009–2010	Heroes	Lauren Gilmore	8 episodes
2011	A Christmas Kiss	Priscilla Hall	Television film
2012	CSI: Miami	Jill Ferris	Episode: "Terminal Velocity"
2012	Lake Placid: The Final Chapter	Sheriff Theresa Giovi	Television film
2012–2013	The Client List	Taylor Berkhalter	Recurring role, 14 episodes
2013	In the Dark	Ali	Television film
2014	A Christmas Kiss II	Miss Hall	Television film
2014	Beauty & the Beast	FBI Special Agent Dana Landon	4 episodes
2014	Forget and Forgive	Det. Anne Walker	Television film
2014	Hell's Kitchen	Herself	Episode: "16 Chefs Compete"
2014–2015	Stalker	Amanda Taylor	11 episodes
2016	Seduced	Caroline	Television film
2016	Revenge Porn	Elaine Harris	Television film; AKA My Daughter's Disgrace
2016	The Last Ship	Allison Shaw	13 episodes
2016–2017	Hawaii Five-0	Dr. Madison Gray	3 episodes
2017	Flaked	Alex	5 episodes
2017	NCIS	May Dawson	Episode: "Beastmaster"
2017–2019	Jane the Virgin	Eileen	6 episodes
2018	Magnum P.I.	Brooke Mason	Episode: "Sudden Death"
2018–2019	The Oath	Aria Price	Recurring role (13 episodes)
2019	Family Pictures	Maggie	Television
2019	Tales	Mrs. Sinclair	Episode: "My Life"
2020	Sleeping with Danger	Grace Tanner	Lifetime Television film
2021	Girl in the Basement	Nurse (uncredited)	Television film; director
2021	Switched Before Birth	-	Television film; director
2022	Girl in Room 13	-	Television film; director
2022	Law & Order	-	Episode: "Only the Lonely"; director
2024	Devil on Campus: The Larry Ray Story	-	Television film; director

=== Video games ===
Year	Title	Role	Notes
2002	Law & Order: Dead on the Money	ADA Serena Southerlyn (voice)	Video game
2003	Law & Order: Double or Nothing	ADA Serena Southerlyn (voice)	Video game
2004	Law & Order: Justice Is Served	ADA Serena Southerlyn (voice)	Video game
