= Jesse L. Martin =

American actor (born 1969)

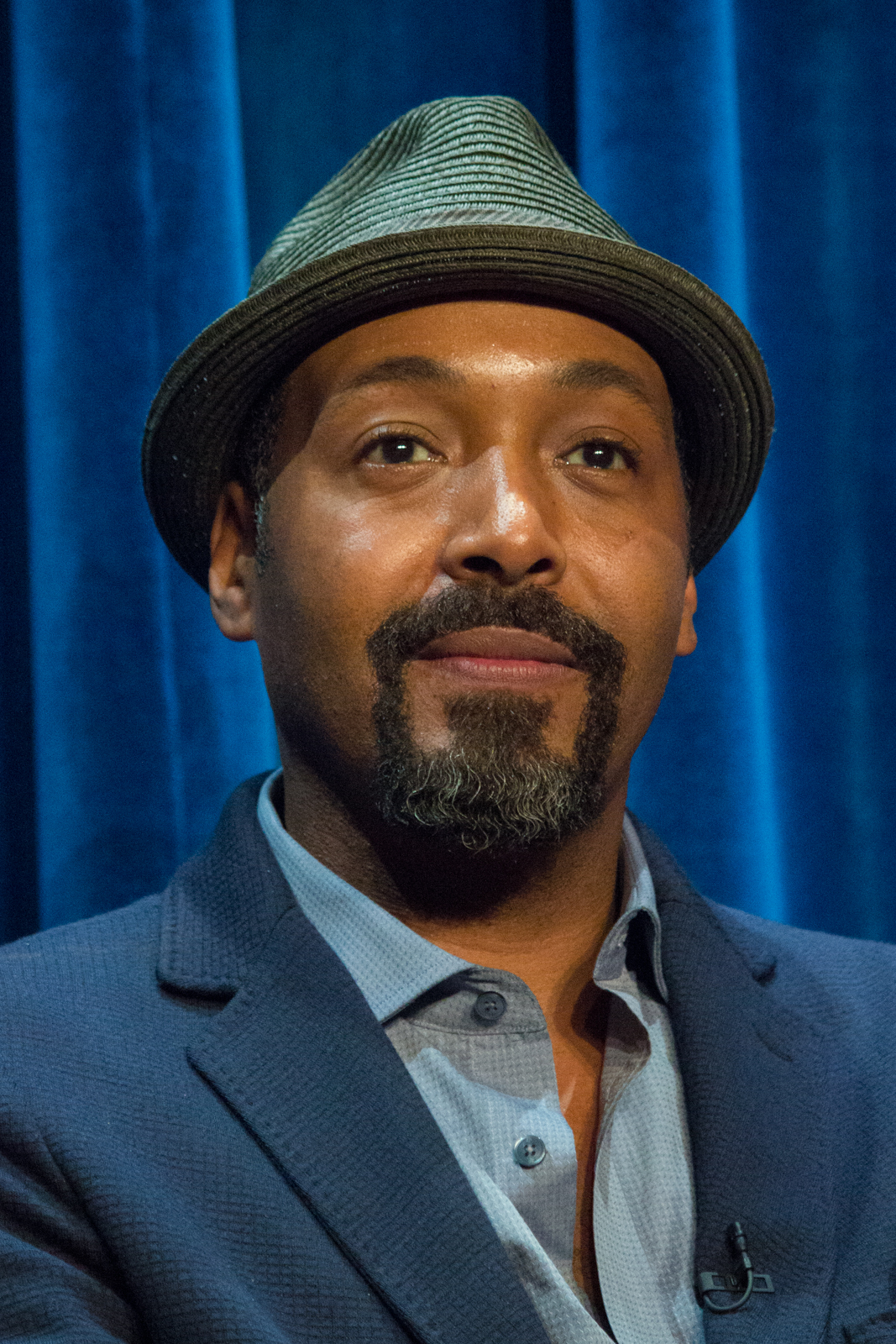
- Martin at the PaleyFest Fall TV Previews 2014 for The Flash
- Born: Jesse Lamont Watkins; January 18, 1969 (age 57); Rocky Mount, Virginia, U.S.
- Education: New York University (BA)
- Occupations: Actor, singer
- Years active: 1993–present

Jesse Lamont Martin (né Watkins; January 18, 1969) is an American actor and singer. He is best known for his role of Tom Collins on Broadway in the musical Rent and performed on television as NYPD Detective Ed Green on Law & Order, Captain Joe West on The Flash, and professor Alec Mercer on The Irrational.

== Early life ==
Martin, the third of four sons, was born on January 18, 1969 in Rocky Mount, Virginia. His father, Jesse Reed Watkins (1943–2003), was a truck driver, and his mother, Virginia Price, a college counselor. He was born two months premature. His parents divorced when he was a child. His mother eventually remarried and Martin adopted his stepfather's surname.

When Martin was in grade school, the family relocated to Buffalo, New York, but Martin began to dislike speaking because of his Southern accent and was often overcome with shyness. A concerned educator and mentor influenced him to join an after-school drama program and cast him as the pastor in The Golden Goose. Being from Virginia, the young Martin played the character the only way he knew how: as an inspired Southern Baptist preacher. The act was a hit, and Martin emerged from his shell. Martin attended high school at the Buffalo Academy for Visual and Performing Arts. He later enrolled in New York University's Tisch School of the Arts' theatre program.

== Career ==
After graduation, Martin toured the states with John Houseman's The Acting Company. He appeared in Shakespeare's Rock-in-Roles at the Actors Theatre of Louisville and The Butcher's Daughter at the Cleveland Play House, and returned to Manhattan to perform in local theatre, soap operas, and commercials. Finding that auditions, regional theater, and bit parts were no way to support himself, Martin waited tables at several restaurants around the city. He was serving a pizza when his appearance on CBS's Guiding Light aired in the same eatery. While the show aired, the whole waitstaff gathered around the bar television to cheer his performance.

Martin made his Broadway debut in Timon of Athens, and then performed in The Government Inspector with Lainie Kazan. While employed at the Moondance Diner, he met the playwright Jonathan Larson, who also worked on the restaurant's staff. In 1996, Larson's musical Rent took the theatre world by storm, with Martin in the role of gay computer geek/philosophy professor Tom Collins. The 1990s update of Puccini's La Bohème earned six Drama Desk Awards, five Obie Awards, four Tony Awards, and the Pulitzer Prize. In 1998, the West End production of Rent opened with four of the original cast members, including Martin. He played Tad in the concept album of Bright Lights, Big City.

In 2010, Martin returned to the stage for one of his biggest theater commitments since Law & Order, performing in the productions of The Merchant of Venice and The Winter's Tale as a part of The Public Theater's Shakespeare in the Park at the Delacorte Theater in Central Park. He played the roles of Gratiano and King Polixenes, respectively. The two shows were performed in repertory, beginning with previews on June 9, 2010, through to the final performance on August 1, 2010.

The Merchant of Venice later transferred to Broadway to the Broadhurst Theater for a limited engagement, in which Martin reprised his role as Gratiano. The show began previews on October 19, 2010, and officially opened on November 7. The show began a hiatus on January 9 to accommodate Al Pacino's pre-existing obligations, and resumed from February 1, 2011, to February 20, 2011; Martin did not reprise his role after the hiatus due to other work commitments. He took part in a one-night-only reading benefit of Romeo and Juliet to celebrate the 50th anniversary of the opening of the Delacorte Theater in Central Park, alongside Meryl Streep, Kevin Kline, Raúl Esparza, and others on June 18, 2012.

=== Television work ===
Martin landed roles on Fox's short-lived 413 Hope St. and Eric Bross's independent film Restaurant (1998). Ally McBeal's creator, David E. Kelley, attended Rent's Broadway premiere and remembered Martin when the show needed a new boyfriend for the title character. His performance as Dr. Greg Butters on Ally McBeal caught the attention of David Duchovny, who cast Martin as a baseball-playing alien in a 1999 episode of The X-Files titled "The Unnatural" that Duchovny wrote and directed.

While still shooting Ally McBeal, Martin heard rumors that actor Benjamin Bratt planned to leave the cast of Law & Order. Martin had tried out for the show years before and won the minor role of a car-radio thief named Earl the Hamster, but decided to wait for a bigger part. With the opportunity presenting itself, Martin approached Law & Order producer Dick Wolf regarding the opening. Wolf hoped to cast him, and upon hearing that CBS and Fox both offered Martin development deals, he gave the actor the part without an audition.

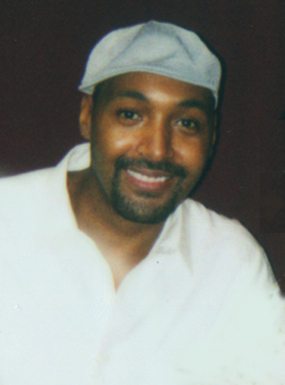
Martin at the 2006 Broadway Cares/Equity Fights AIDS Annual Grand Auction and Flea Market

From 1999 to 2008, he starred as Detective Edward "Ed" Green on Law & Order. Altogether, he was the fifth-longest serving cast member behind S. Epatha Merkerson, Sam Waterston, Jerry Orbach, and Steven Hill. He had a brief hiatus at the end of the 2004–2005 season while he was filming the movie adaptation of Rent in which he reprised the role of Tom Collins. Martin's final episode of Law & Order aired April 23, 2008, as he was replaced by Anthony Anderson. Martin returned to NBC a year later as the co-star of The Philanthropist.

On September 14, 2012, NBC announced that Martin would be joining the cast of Smash during season two for a nine-episode arc as Scott Nichols, the artistic director of the Manhattan Theatre Workshop. Martin also starred in an NBC pilot called The Secret Lives of Husbands and Wives as Greg Cooke, however it was not picked up to series.

Martin played Joe West in the superhero series The Flash, a spin-off from Arrow which premiered in October 2014. In the third season episode "Duet", Martin played gangster Digsy Foss in Barry and Kara's dreamworld. In its fifth season in 2018, a back injury forced Martin to take medical leave following the season's fourth episode. From the start of the season until then he was almost always leaning against a wall or sitting down. Martin returned from medical leave in January 2019 with the season's fifteenth episode. He departed as a series regular after the eighth season, having been cast in the NBC pilot The Irrational, in which he already starred.

=== Film work ===
On March 4, 2013, it was announced that Martin would replace Lenny Kravitz as Marvin Gaye in Sexual Healing, an upcoming biopic directed by Julien Temple, and produced by Vassal Benton and Fred Bestall. Martin had been attached to the Marvin Gaye biopic for years and had stated that it was his dream role to portray the legendary Motown singer. With only three weeks to go on a planned nine-and-a-half week shoot, it was reported that production had stopped on the biopic, primarily due to financial problems (crew members were said to have not been paid fully for their work on the film). Approximately 70% of the film had been shot.

=== Other work ===
Martin narrated the audio book The Fire Next Time by James Baldwin and On the Shoulder of Giants, Volume 2: Master Intellects and Creative Giants by Kareem Abdul-Jabbar. He co-produced the off-Broadway production of Fully Committed with Rent co-star Adam Pascal (and two other producers).

Martin sits on the board of trustees for the Jonathan Larson Performing Arts Foundation along with Rent co-producer Kevin McCollum.

== Personal life ==
In October 2006, Martin returned to Buffalo, New York to work on an independent film (Buffalo Bushido), and was robbed two days after his arrival there.

In 2018, Martin suffered a back injury during the summer. He took a medical leave of absence from The Flash after recording scenes for a few episodes.

After residing in New York City for most his career, he now lives in Vancouver, BC.

== Stage work ==
- Ring of Men (off-Broadway) – unknown date and character
- The Prince and the Pauper (off-Broadway) – unknown character and date
- Arabian Nights (off-Broadway) – Prince of Fools, Clarinetist, Boy (1994)
- The Butcher's Daughter (Cleveland Playhouse) – unknown character (1993)
- Timon of Athens (Broadway Premiere) – "Alcibiades' Officer" (original), "Second Masseur" (original), Alcibiades (understudy) (1993).
- The Government Inspector (Broadway revival) – Abdulin (original), Panteleyeva (understudy) (1994)
- Rent (off-Broadway) – Tom Collins (1996)
- Rent (Broadway) – Tom Collins (1996)
- Rent (West End) – Tom Collins (1998)
- Bright Lights, Big City (musical) (concept recording) – Tad
- The Threepenny Opera (Williamstown, MA; Williamstown Theatre Festival Production) – Macheath (2003)
- The Merchant of Venice (Shakespeare in the Park) – Gratiano (summer 2010)
- The Winter's Tale (Shakespeare in the Park) – King Polixenes (summer 2010)
- The Merchant of Venice (Broadway) – Gratiano (2010); transfer from the Shakespeare in the Park production
- Romeo and Juliet (Public Theater; Delacorte Theatre's 50th anniversary) – Gregory, Friar John, Watchman 2 (2012)

== Filmography ==
=== Film ===
Year	Title	Role	Notes
1998	Restaurant	Quincy	
2003	Season of Youth	Roc Williams	
2005	Rent	Tom Collins	(Note: Repeated his Off-Broadway and Broadway role, along with five other original main cast members.)
2007	The Cake Eaters	Judd	
2009	Peter and Vandy	Paul	
2009	Buffalo Bushido	Shawn	
2011	Puncture	Daryl King	
2012	Joyful Noise	Marcus Hill	
2013	Long Live TOY	Himself	Documentary
TBA	Sexual Healing †	Marvin Gaye	Post-production

=== Television ===
Year	Title	Role	Notes
1995	One Life to Live	Quincy	Unknown episodes
1995, 1998	New York Undercover	Mustafa, Kaylen	Episodes: "All in the Family", "Going Native"
1997–1998	413 Hope St.	Antonio Collins	Main role 10 episodes
1998–1999	Ally McBeal	Dr. Greg Butters	Recurring role (seasons 1–2); 12 episodes
1999	The X-Files	Josh Exley	Episode: "The Unnatural"
1999	Deep in My Heart	Don Williams	TV movie
1999–2008	Law & Order	Detective Edward "Ed" Green	Main role (seasons 10–18); 198 episodes
1999–2000	Law & Order: Special Victims Unit	Detective Edward "Ed" Green	Episodes: "...Or Just Look Like One", "Entitled"
2001	Law & Order: Criminal Intent	Detective Edward "Ed" Green	Episode: "Poison"
2004	A Christmas Carol	Ghost of Christmas Present / Ticket Seller	TV movie
2004	Law & Order: Justice Is Served	Junior Homicide Detective Ed Green (voice)	Video game
2007	Andy Barker, P.I.	Detective Edward "Ed" Green	Episode: "The Big No Sleep"
2008	A Muppets Christmas: Letters to Santa	A Postal Worker	TV movie; cameo
2009	The Philanthropist	Philip Maidstone	Main role 8 episodes
2013	Smash	Scott Nichols	Recurring role (season 2), 9 episodes
2014–2023	The Flash	Joe West Digsy Foss	Main role (season 1–8); Recurring role (season 9) Episode: "Duet"
2016–2017	Sofia the First	Kai	Voice role, 2 episodes
2017	Supergirl	Joe West	Episode: "Crisis on Earth-X, Part 1"
2019	Rent: Live	Himself	Television special
2022–present	How It Really Happened	Himself	Host (season 7 – present); anthology series
2023–2025	The Irrational	Alec Mercer	Lead role (seasons 1–2)
2026	Percy Jackson and the Olympians	Frederick Chase	
