= Law and Order =

Law and Order may refer to:

== In politics ==
- The preservation of the rule of law
- The keeping of the peace (law)
- Law and order (politics), a term common in political debate and discussion, generally indicating support of a strict criminal justice system
- Law and Order Offensive Party, a former minor German political party
- Operation Law and Order, an Israeli military operation against a Hezbollah base in Lebanon
- Law and Order, previous name of Platform 21, a minor right-wing Latvian political party

== In entertainment and media ==
=== In film ===
- Law and Order (1932 film), a Western
- Law and Order (1940 film), a Western
- Law and Order (1942 film), a Billy the Kid Western
- Law and Order (1953 film), a Western
- Law and Order (1969 film), a documentary
- Law and Order (2026 film), an action-thriller
- Exiled: A Law & Order Movie, a 1998 drama

=== In television ===
- Law & Order (franchise) (1990–present), a number of related police and legal dramas created by Dick Wolf for NBC:
  - Law & Order (1990–2010, 2022–present), the first series in the franchise
  - Law & Order: Special Victims Unit (1999–present), the second series in the franchise
  - Law & Order: Criminal Intent (2001–2011), the third series in the franchise
  - Law & Order: Trial by Jury (2005–2006), the fourth series in the franchise
  - Law & Order: UK (2009–2014), a British adaptation of the original series
  - Law & Order: LA (2010–2011), the fifth (American) series in the franchise
  - Law & Order True Crime (2017), the sixth American series in the franchise
  - Law & Order: Organized Crime (2021–2025), the seventh American series in the franchise
  - Law & Order Toronto: Criminal Intent (2024–present), a Canadian show based on Law & Order: Criminal Intent
- Law & Order (British TV series), 1978 series of four police and legal television plays
- "Law and Order", an episode of the 1975 TV series Survivors

=== In music ===
- Law and Order (album), by Lindsey Buckingham
- "Law & Order" (song), by the Tom Robinson Band on the 1979 album TRB Two
- "Law & Order", the theme to the Law & Order franchise, a song by Mike Post from the 1994 album Inventions from the Blue Line

=== In video games ===
- Law & Order: Dead on the Money
- Law & Order: Double or Nothing
- Law & Order: Justice Is Served
- Law & Order: Criminal Intent (video game)
- Law & Order: Legacies

=== In other uses ===
- Law & Order (G.I. Joe), a fictional K-9 team in the G.I. Joe universe
- Law and Order, 1973 NYC police novel by Dorothy Uhnak which became a TV-movie starring Darren McGavin

== See also ==
- Law and Order Party (disambiguation)
- Crime and Punishment (disambiguation)
