= Jerry Orbach filmography =

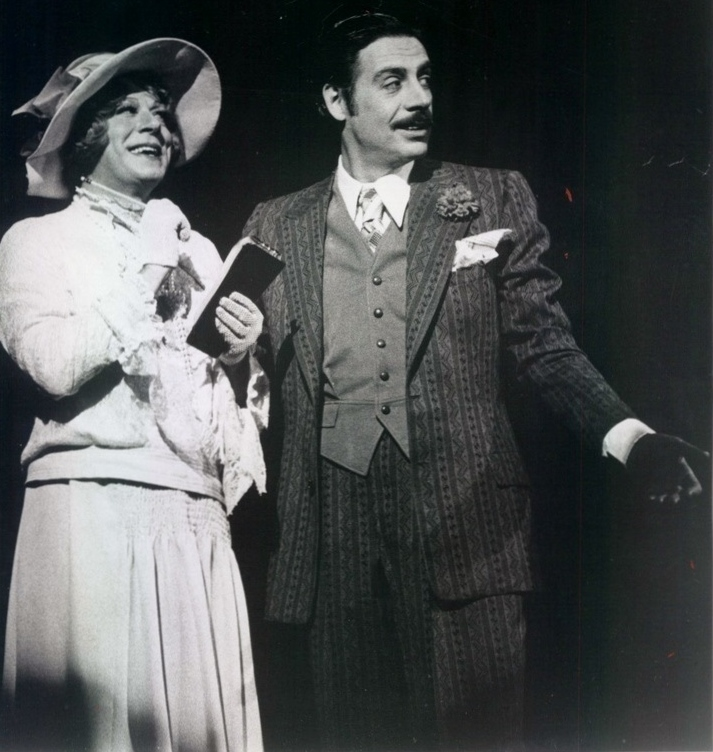
Jerry Orbach in the Broadway production of Chicago in 1975

Jerry Orbach was an American actor of the stage and screen. Orbach is most known for his long-running leading role as Det. Lennie Briscoe in Law & Order from 1992 to 2004. He also made appearances on Murder, She Wrote and The Golden Girls.

He originally starred on the Broadway stage appearing in a revival of Guys and Dolls in 1965. He also starred in Carousel that same year, Annie Get Your Gun in 1966, Promises, Promises in 1968, and Chicago in 1975. Orbach also made appearances in film including small roles in Guys and Dolls (1955), Marty (1955), and Bye Bye Birdie (1963). He gained greater attention for his performances in Sidney Lumet's Prince of the City (1981), and Woody Allen's Crimes and Misdemeanors (1989). He earned affection from audiences for his roles in romantic drama Dirty Dancing (1987), and his voice role as Lumiere in the Walt Disney Animated classic Beauty and the Beast (1991).

== Filmography ==
=== Film ===
Year	Title	Role	Notes
1955	Guys and Dolls	Barbershop Extra	Uncredited
1955	Marty	Ballroom Extra	Uncredited
1958	Cop Hater	Mumzer - Gang Leader	
1961	Mad Dog Coll	Joe Clegg	
1963	Bye Bye Birdie	Bob - Ed Sullivan Show Producer	Uncredited
1964	Ensign Pulver	Axel, cop in car	
1965	John Goldfarb, Please Come Home	Pinkerton	
1971	The Gang That Couldn't Shoot Straight	Salvatore "Kid Sally" Palumbo	
1972	A Fan's Notes	Frederick Earl Exley	
1975	Fore Play	Jerry Lorsey	
1977	The Sentinel	Michael Dayton	
1981	Underground Aces	Herbert Penlittle	
1981	Prince of the City	Detective Gus Levy	
1985	Brewster's Millions	Charlie Pegler	
1986	The Imagemaker	Byron Caine	
1986	F/X	Nicolas DeFranco	
1987	Dirty Dancing	Dr. Jake Houseman	
1987	Someone to Watch Over Me	Lieutenant Garber	
1987	I Love N.Y.	Leo	
1989	Last Exit to Brooklyn	Boyce	
1989	Crimes and Misdemeanors	Jack Rosenthal	
1991	Dead Women in Lingerie	Bartoli	
1991	A Gnome Named Gnorm	Stan Walton	
1991	Out for Justice	Captain Ronnie Dozinger	
1991	Toy Soldiers	Albert Trotta	Uncredited
1991	Delusion	Larry	
1991	Delirious	Lou Sherwood	
1991	California Casanova	Constantin Rominoffski	
1991	Beauty and the Beast	Lumière	Voice
1992	Straight Talk	Milo Jacoby	
1992	Universal Soldier	Dr. Christopher Gregor	
1992	Mr. Saturday Night	Phil Gussman	
1993	The Cemetery Club	Jake Rubin	Uncredited
1996	Aladdin and the King of Thieves	Sa'luk	Voice, Direct-to-video
1997	Beauty and the Beast: The Enchanted Christmas	Lumière	Voice, Direct-to-video
1998	Beauty and the Beast: Belle's Magical World	Lumière	Voice, Direct-to-video
1999	Temps	Announcer	
2000	The Acting Class	Elton	
2000	The Road to El Dorado	Mo	Voice
2000	Chinese Coffee	Jake Manheim	
2000	Prince of Central Park	Businessman	
2002	Manna from Heaven	Waltz Contest Announcer	
2003	Broadway: The Golden Age, by the Legends Who Were There	Himself	
2003	Try to Remember: The Fantasticks	Himself	
2004	Protesters	Police Investigator	

Source: Turner Classic Movies

=== Television ===
Year	Title	Role	Notes
1961	Twenty-Four Hours in a Woman's Life	Cristoff	TV movie
1967	Annie Get Your Gun	Charles Davenport	TV movie
1973	Love, American Style	Homer	Episode: "Love and the Hoodwinked Honey"
1974	What's My Line	Panelist	
1975	Medical Center	Josh	Episode: "The Captives"
1975	Kojak	Brubaker	Episode: "A Question of Answers"
1980	Buck Rogers in the 25th Century	Lars Mangros	Episode: "Space Rockers"
1983	Ryan's Hope	Mr. Brahm	Airdate: March 17, 1983
1983	The Magic of Herself the Elf	King Thorn	Voice, TV movie
1983	An Invasion of Privacy	Sam Bianchi	TV movie
1985	Our Family Honor	Brian Merrick	2 episodes
1985–91	Murder, She Wrote	Harry McGraw	6 episodes
1986	Dream West	Capt. John Stutter	Television mini-series
1986	The Adventures of the Galaxy Rangers	Zachary Foxx	Voice
1987	Tales from the Darkside	Robert	Episode: "Everybody Needs a Little Love"
1987	Out on a Limb	Mort Viner	TV movie
1987	Love Among Thieves	Spicer	TV movie
1987–88	The Law & Harry McGraw	Harry McGraw	16 episodes
1988	Simon & Simon	Harrison / Malcolm Stanley III	Episode: "Ain't Gonna Get It From Me, Jack"
1989	Perry Mason: The Case of the Musical Murder	Blaine Counter	TV movie
1989	The Flamingo Kid	Phil Brody	
1990	Hunter	Sal Scarlatti	Episode: "Son and Heir"
1990	The Golden Girls	Glen O'Brien	Episode: "Cheaters"
1990	Who's the Boss?	Nick	Episode: "Starlight Memories"
1990	Dead Women in Lingerie	Bartoli	TV movie
1990	Kojak: None So Blind	Tony Salducci	TV movie
1990	In Defense of a Married Man	Alan Michaelson	TV movie
1991	Perry Mason: The Case of the Ruthless Reporter	Vic St. John	TV movie
1991	Law & Order	Frank Lehrmann	Episode: "The Wages of Love"
1992	Empty Nest	Arthur	2 episodes
1992	Quiet Killer	Dr. Califano	
1992	Neil Simon's Broadway Bound	Jack Jerome	TV movie
1992	Mastergate	Clifton Byers	TV movie
1992–2004	Law & Order	Det. Lennie Briscoe	273 episodes
1995	Captain Planet and the Planeteers		Voice
1996	Frasier	Mitch (voice)	Episode: "High Crane Drifter"
1996–99	Homicide: Life on the Street	Det. Lennie Briscoe	3 episodes
1998	Exiled: A Law & Order Movie	Det. Lennie Briscoe	TV movie
1999–2000	Law & Order: Special Victims Unit	Det. Lennie Briscoe	3 episodes
2000-02	Encounters with the Unexplained	Himself, Host	TV documentary
2001	Law & Order: Criminal Intent	Det. Lennie Briscoe	Episode: "Poison"
2001–02	Disney's House of Mouse	Lumière	Voice, 8 episodes
2005	Law & Order: Trial by Jury	D.A. Investigator Lennie Briscoe	2 episodes; Posthumous release

=== Theatre ===
Year	Title	Role	Venue	Ref.
1955–61	The Threepenny Opera	Streetsinger, Smith and Macheath	Theatre de Lys, NY	
1960	The Fantasticks	El Gallo	Sullivan Street Playhouse, NY	
1961–63	Carnival!	Various roles	Winter Garden Theatre, Broadway	
1964	The Cradle Will Rock	Larry Foreman	Theatre Four, NY	
1965	Guys and Dolls	Sky Masterson	City Center, Broadway	
1965	Carousel	Jigger Craigin	New York City Center	
1966	Annie Get Your Gun	Charlie Davenport	1681 Broadway Theatre, Broadway	
1967	The Natural Look	Malcolm	Longacre Theatre, Broadway	
1967	Scuba Duba	Harold Wonder	New Theatre, NY	
1968–72	Promises, Promises	Chuck Baxter	Shubert Theatre, Broadway	
1972–73	6 Rms Riv Vu	Paul Friedman	Lunt-Fontanne Theatre, Broadway	
1975–77	Chicago	Billy Flynn	46th Street Theatre, Broadway	
1980–85	42nd Street	Julian Marsh	St. James Theatre, Broadway	

== Other ==
=== Video games ===
Year	Title	Role	Notes
2000	Disney's Beauty and the Beast Magical Ballroom	Lumière	Voice
2002	Law & Order: Dead on the Money	Det. Lennie Briscoe	Voice
2003	Law & Order: Double or Nothing	Det. Lennie Briscoe	Voice
2004	Law & Order: Justice Is Served	Senior Homicide Detective Lennie Briscoe (voice)	Voice

=== Theme park ===
Year	Title	Role
2003	Mickey's PhilharMagic	Lumière
