= Michelle Lee (actress) =

American actress

- Occupations: Actress, stuntwoman
- Years active: 2004-present

Michelle Lee is an American actress, martial artist, and stuntwoman. Since the early 2000s, Lee has provided stunt work and motion capture for dozens of films, television series and video games, and also portrayed the roles of Ada Wong in Resident Evil 6 and Mileena in the second season of Mortal Kombat: Legacy.

== Selected roles ==
=== Film ===
Acting roles
Year	Title	Role	Notes
2004	50 First Dates	Woman	Uncredited
2004	Chicks with Sticks, Part 3	Demon Queen, Green Demon	Short film
2005	Chicks with Sticks: Live at the Grand Slam	White Warrior	Short film
2006	Girl with Gun	Ninja Girl	Short film
2006	You, Me and Dupree	Hawaiian Air Ticketing Agent	Uncredited
2006	The Strange Case of Dr. Jekyll and Mr. Hyde	Kim Li	
2006	Duan Quan	Liu Xi	Short film
2007	Pirates of the Caribbean: At World's End	Lian	Uncredited
2007	The Delivery Man		Short film
2008	Trailer Park of Terror	Miss China	
2008	Stiletto	Geisha #1	Also choreographer
2008	The Living Sword	Madison	Short film
2008	Cleaner	The Cleaner	Short film
2008	Life at the Trailer Park of Terror	Miss China	Short film
2009	Sleeping Dragon	Kaya	Short film
2009	Blood and Bone	Sherry	
2010	Supreme Champion	Ming	
2011	Cold Fusion	Ekaterina Demidrova	
2012	The Girl from the Naked Eye	Cop	
2015	The Hunted	Serena	
2014	Black Salt	Horse Ripper	Short film
2017	Check Point	Suzie	Also associate producer
2017	Zambo Dende: Predictable night		Short film
2018	Blindsided: The Game	Emily	
2018	Venom	Riot/Corinne Wan	Credited as "Malaysia EMT / Riot Host"
2018	The Green Ghost	Song Shijin	
2019	California Love	Lisa Yuen	
2021	Black Widow	Oksana	
2023	Plane	Isabella Yu	
2023	Tiger 3	General Zimou	Indian film

Stunt roles
Year	Title	Notes
2007	Pirates of the Caribbean: At World's End	
2008	Ninja Cheerleaders	Double
2009	Crank: High Voltage	
2009	Gamer	
2009	Surrogates	
2010	The Last Airbender	
2010	Lure	Direct-to-Video; double
2011	Pirates of the Caribbean: On Stranger Tides	
2010	Olympus Has Fallen	Double for Malana Lea
2013	Pacific Rim	
2015	Mockingjay: Burn	Short film
2016	Suicide Squad	
2019	California Love	

=== Television ===
Acting roles
Year	Title	Role	Notes
2004	Next Action Star	Herself	Contestant
2006	Saurian	Chu	TV movie
2006	Numb3rs	Michelle Kim	Episode: "The Mole"
2007	Moonlight	Cocktail Waitress	Episode: "B.C."
2008	Depth Charge	Chang	TV movie
2009	CSI: NY	Jody Sun	Episode: "She's Not There"
2009	1000 Ways to Die	May	Episode: "Death Bites"
2010	CSI: Crime Scene Investigation	Desiree McQuire	Episode: "Pool Shark"
2011	Supah Ninjas	Melody	Episode: "Hero of the Shadows"
2012	America's Most Wanted: America Fights Back	Young Kavila	Episode: "Luis Mena"
2013	Mortal Kombat: Legacy	Mileena	Recurring (season 2)
2013	We Are Men	Jill	Episode: "Pilot"
2014	Metal Hurlant Chronicles	Gas	Episode: "The Endomorphe"
2014	Switched at Birth	Phoebe	Episode: "Have You Really the Courage?"
2014	CollegeHumor Originals	Julian	Episode: "What Happens Next"
2017	The Librarians	Lam's Major Domo	Episode: "And the Fatal Separation"
2018	Altered Carbon	Female Fighter	Episode: "In a Lonely Place"
2022	The Rookie	Jane Becker	Episode: "Hit List"
2022	Blood & Treasure	Violet	Main role

Stunt roles
Year	Title	Notes
2009	The Mentalist	Uncredited; Episode: "Red Scare"; Double for Christina Chang
2009	Angel of Death	Webseries
2015	Community	Uncredited; Episode: "Modern Espionage"
2018	The Rookie	1 episode; Double for Melissa O'Neil

=== Video games ===
Year	Title	Role
2007	Pirates of the Caribbean: At World's End	Lian (voice, motion capture)
2007	Golden Axe: Beast Rider	Tyris Flare (motion and face capture)
2009	UFC 2009 Undisputed	Arianny Celeste (motion capture)
2010	God of War III	Motion capture
2011	Hunted: The Demon's Forge	E'lara (motion capture)
2012	Kinect Star Wars	Mavra Zane (motion capture)
2012	Resident Evil 6	Ada Wong (motion capture)
2013	God of War: Ascension	Motion capture
2014	The Last of Us: Left Behind	Stunts
2015	Halo 5: Guardians	Motion capture
2017	Uncharted: The Lost Legacy	Chloe Frazer (motion capture)

Various roles: Medal of Honor: Underground (2000), Law & Order: Dead on the Money (2002), Law & Order II: Double or Nothing (2003), Law & Order: Justice is Served (2004), Law & Order: Criminal Intent (2005), Gears of War (2006), Super Street Fighter II Turbo HD Remix (2008), Resistance: Retribution (2009), Call of Duty: Black Ops (2010), Blur (2010), X-Men: Destiny (2011), Sleeping Dogs (2012), Call of Duty: Black Ops II (2012).

=== Miscellaneous ===
- TV show Next Action Star (2004) - herself
- Snapdragon commercial (2012) - Mage

== Awards and recognition ==
In 2006, Lee was nominated in the category "Female Action Performer of the Year" at the Action On Film International Film Festival for her role of a ninja in the short film Girl with Gun. In 2007, she, along with the others stunt performers in Pirates of the Caribbean: At World's End, was nominated in Screen Actors Guild Awards for "Outstanding Performance by a Stunt Ensemble in a Motion Picture". In 2010, she was featured on the cover of Inside Kung Fu.
