= Christopher Daniel Barnes =

American actor (born 1972)

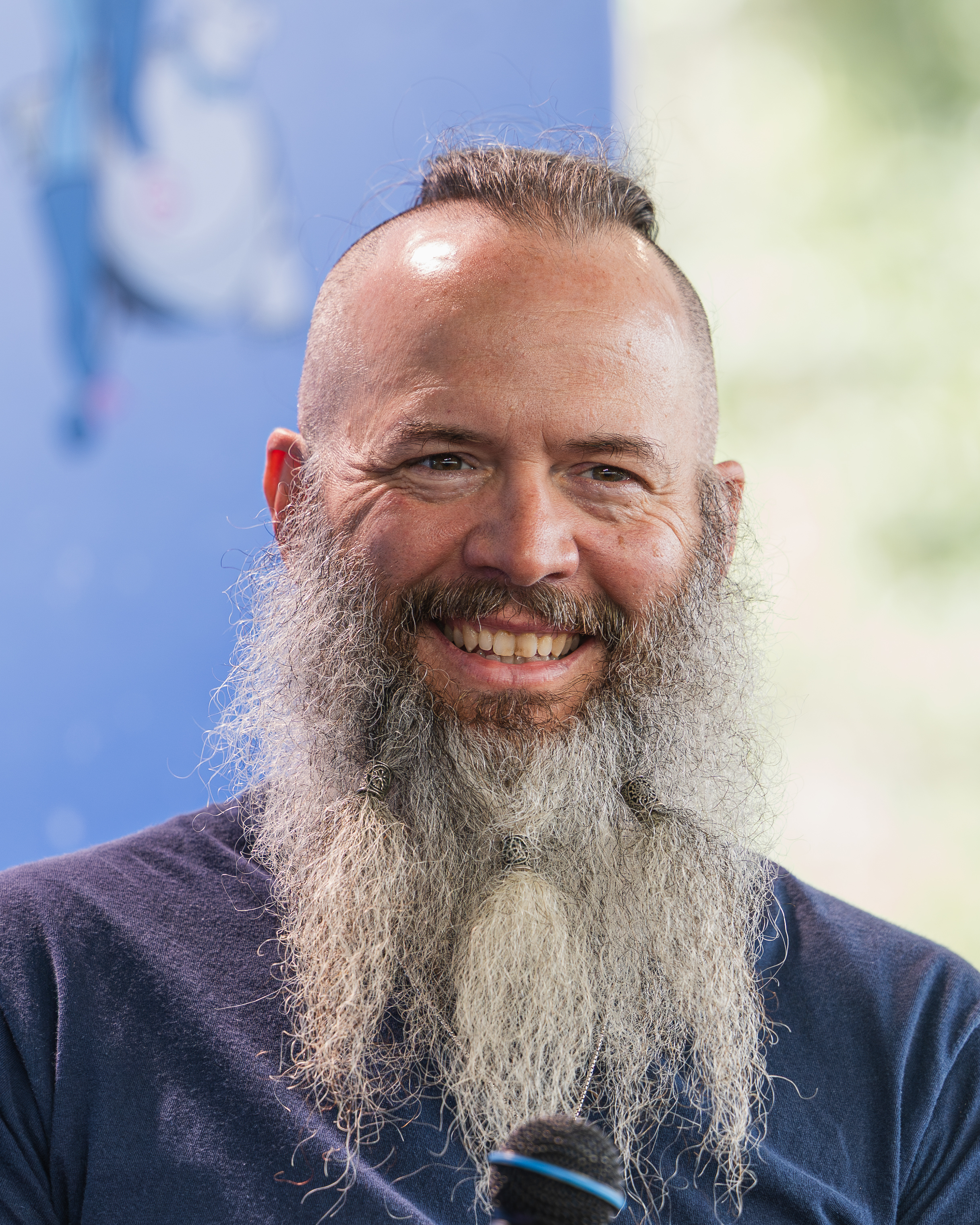
- Barnes at GalaxyCon Nashville in 2026
- Born: November 7, 1972 (age 53); Portland, Maine, U.S.
- Occupations: Actor; writer; child model
- Years active: 1981–present
- Website: christopherdanielbarnes.com

Christopher Daniel Barnes or referred to by his stage name as C.B. Barnes (born November 7, 1972) is an American actor, writer, and former child model. He is best known for his voice role as the titular character in the 1990s animated series Spider-Man: The Animated Series (1994–1998), as well as Prince Eric in Disney's The Little Mermaid (1989). On-screen, he has portrayed Greg Brady in the films The Brady Bunch Movie (1995) and A Very Brady Sequel (1996).

He starred in 22 episodes of the science fiction series Starman (1986–1987), as the 14-year-old son of the title character played by Robert Hays and had a starring role in the 1988–1989 NBC sitcom Day by Day as Ross Harper. From 1998–2000, he played Leonard on the UPN sitcom Malcolm & Eddie.

== Early life ==
Barnes was born on November 7, 1972, in Portland, Maine. He is the youngest of three children, with an older sister and an older brother.

== Career ==
=== Live-action roles ===
Barnes originally began his career as a child model, he would later began pursuing his acting career in 1981 at 8 years old. In the 1986–1987 series Starman, he played the teenage boy Scott, the son of the Starman. He starred in the NBC sitcom Day by Day for two seasons. In one episode's dream sequence which included many guest stars from The Brady Bunch, he played a fourth Brady son, "Chuck Brady". He later played Greg Brady in The Brady Bunch Movie and A Very Brady Sequel. He starred as Leonard Rickets in the sitcom Malcolm & Eddie.

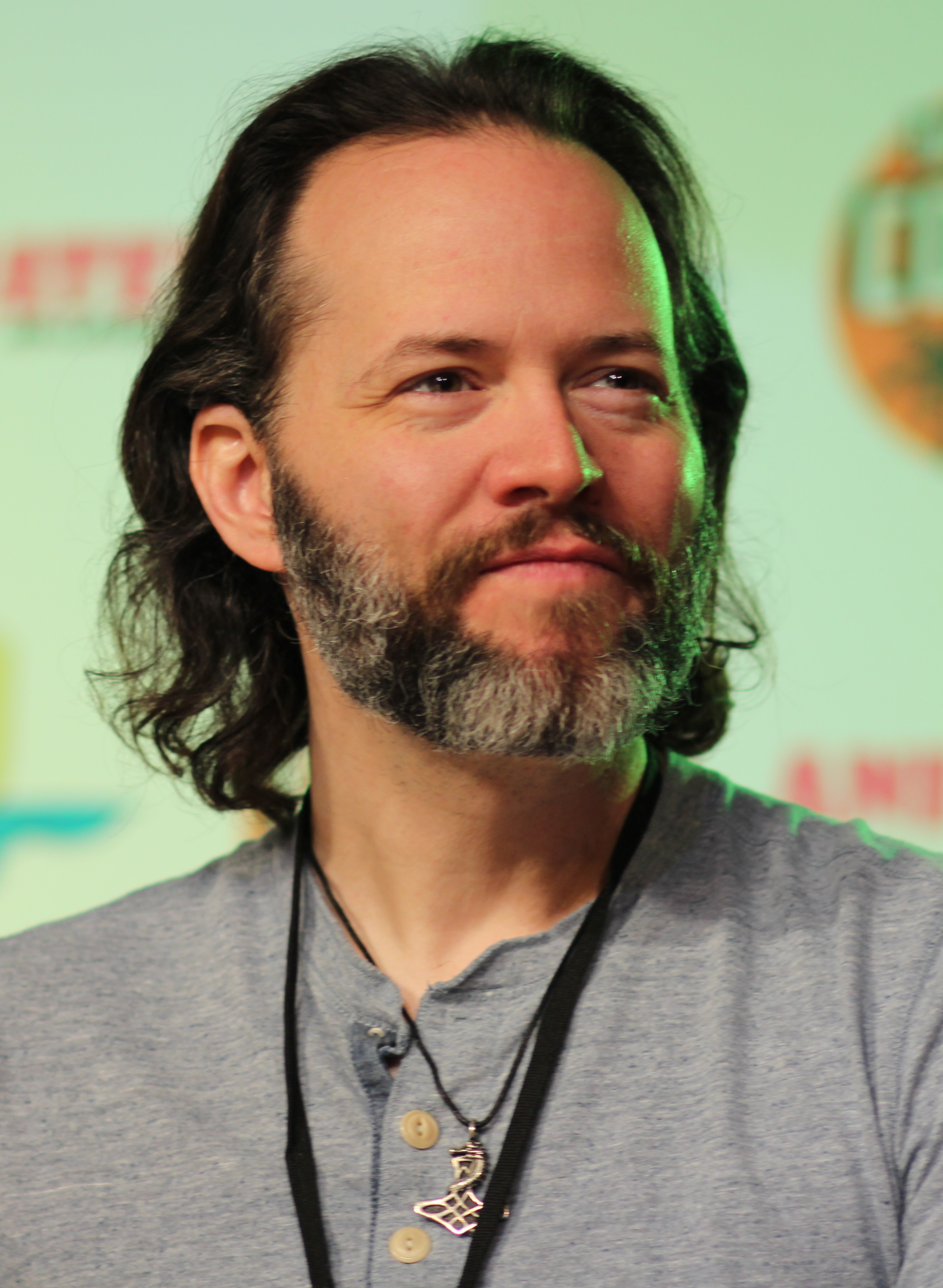
Barnes at the Magic City Comic Con in 2015

He appeared in Beverly Hills, 90210; Clueless; Wings; Blossom; JAG; American Dreamer; The Golden Girls; Touched by an Angel; Herman's Head; Time Trax; 7th Heaven; Empty Nest; Girlfriends; CBS Schoolbreak Special and ABC Weekend Specials.

=== Disney work ===
At age 16 in 1989, Barnes voiced Prince Eric in The Little Mermaid and reprised the role in 2005 for Kingdom Hearts II. He was unable to return for the sequel The Little Mermaid II: Return to the Sea in 2000 and was replaced by Rob Paulsen. He voiced Prince Charming in the Cinderella sequels Cinderella II: Dreams Come True and Cinderella III: A Twist in Time. He reprised the role of Prince Eric 18 years later for Disney Dreamlight Valley.

=== As Spider-Man ===
As a voice actor, Barnes is best known for his main role in the 1994–1998 Spider-Man series. He later provided the voice of Spider-Man Noir in the 2010 video game Spider-Man: Shattered Dimensions, Spider-Man 2099 in the 2011 video game Spider-Man: Edge of Time, Electro, Spyder-Knight and Wolf Spider in the 2012 animated series Ultimate Spider-Man, and also voiced two special costumes, Symbiote Spider-Man and Superior Spider-Man 2.0, in the 2013 video game Marvel Heroes. He reprised his role of Electro and voiced Vulture in the mobile game Spider-Man Unlimited. He again portrayed Electro in the 2019 video game Marvel Ultimate Alliance 3: The Black Order

=== Other work ===
He has provided voices for other animated series including several characters in Captain Planet and the Planeteers, Tagert McStone in Jackie Chan Adventures, and Speckles in Speckles: The Tarbosaurus.

He has also performed voice acting in video games, including Scott Donovan in the Law & Order titles Law & Order: Dead on the Money and Law & Order: Double or Nothing.

=== Short stories ===
Barnes is a writer of short stories which he shares freely on his website.

== Personal life ==
Barnes earned his BA in 2004 and his MA in 2009 and enjoys reading, writing short stories, playing the guitar, and practicing yoga.

== Filmography ==
=== Film ===
Year	Title	Role	Notes
1984	American Dreamer	Kevin Palmer Jr.	Credited as C.B. Barnes
1985	Picking up the Pieces	Tom Harding	Television film
1989	The Little Mermaid	Prince Eric (voice)	
1990	Exile	Dave	Television film
1991	Frankenstein: The College Years	Jay Butterman	Television film
1992	Murder Without Motive: The Edmund Perry Story	Sean	Television film
1995	The Brady Bunch Movie	Greg Brady	
1995	Spring Fling!	Michael	Television film
1996	A Pig's Tale	Barry	Direct-to-video
1996	A Very Brady Sequel	Greg Brady	
2002	Cinderella II: Dreams Come True	Prince Charming (voice)	Direct-to-video
2004	Shut Up and Kiss Me	Ryan Ballister	
2007	Cinderella III: A Twist in Time	Prince Charming (voice)	Direct-to-video
2007	Disney Princess Enchanted Tales: Follow Your Dreams	Additional voices	Direct-to-video
2012	The Dino King	Adult Speckles (voice)	English dub

=== Television ===
Year	Title	Role	Notes
1985	ABC Weekend Specials	Gardner Waterford	Episode: "Columbus Circle"
1985–1986	As the World Turns	Paul Ryan	Unknown episodes
1986–1987	Starman	Scott Hayden	22 episodes, series star Credited as "C.B. Barnes"
1988–1989	Day by Day	Ross Harper	33 episodes
1989–1990	ABC Afterschool Special	Boyd, Will	2 episodes
1990	The Golden Girls	Kevin Kelly	Episode: "Feelings"
1990	Captain Planet and the Planeteers	Additional voices	Credited as Chris Barnes
1992	Herman's Head	Crawford's Son	Episode: "Guns 'n' Neurosis"
1992–1995	Blossom	Farnsworth	3 episodes
1993	Time Trax	Josh Elliott	Episode: "Darien Comes Home"
1994	Empty Nest	Raymond	Episode: "A Chip Off the Old Charley"
1994–1998	Spider-Man: The Animated Series	Peter Parker / Spider-Man, Ben Reilly / Scarlet Spider, Spider-Carnage (voice)	Main role; 65 episodes
1995	CBS Schoolbreak Special	Scott Leone	Episode: "Between Mother and Daughter"
1995	Wings	Greg Brady	Episode: "A House to Die For"
1995	Real Ghosts	Fraternity Brother	Segment: "The Brotherhood"
1996	Clueless	Donal Miller	Episode: "To Party or Not to Party"
1998	Beverly Hills, 90210	Lenny	4 episodes
1998–2000	Malcolm & Eddie	Leonard Rickets	43 episodes
1999	Sonic Underground	Stripes (voice)	Episode: "The Last Resort"
2000	7th Heaven	Police Officer	2 episodes
2000	JAG	Lt. Andy Kingsley	Episode: "JAG TV"
2001	Girlfriends	Ken Duncans	Episode: "Friends, Colleagues, Brothers"
2001	Touched by an Angel	Dennis Loggins	Episode: "Most Likely to Succeed"
2001	Jackie Chan Adventures	Taggart McStone (voice)	Episode: "Agent Tag"
2013–2016	Ultimate Spider-Man	Electro, Spyder-Knight, Wolf Spider, Video Game Voice, Villager (voice)	9 episodes

=== Video games ===
Year	Title	Role	Notes
1991	Police Quest III: The Kindred	Sergeant Sonny Bonds	Credited as Chris Barns
1998	Return to Krondor	Additional voices	Credited as Christopher Daniel Barns
2002	Law & Order: Dead on the Money	Scott Donovan	
2003	Law & Order: Double or Nothing	Scott Donovan	
2005	Kingdom Hearts II	Prince Eric	English dub (Kingdom Hearts HD 1.5 + 2.5 Remix)
2007	Kingdom Hearts II: Final Mix+	Prince Eric	English dub (Kingdom Hearts HD 1.5 + 2.5 Remix)
2010	Spider-Man: Shattered Dimensions	Spider-Man Noir	
2011	Spider-Man: Edge of Time	Spider-Man 2099	
2013	Marvel Heroes	Symbiote Spider-Man	
2014	The Amazing Spider-Man 2	Donald Menken	
2014	Spider-Man Unlimited	Electro, Vulture	
2019	Marvel Ultimate Alliance 3: The Black Order	Electro	
2022	Disney Dreamlight Valley	Prince Eric	
2024	Disney Speedstorm	Prince Eric	

Preceded by Dan Gilvezan	Voice or portrayal of Spider-Man; 1994–1998	Succeeded by Rino Romano
