= Law and Justice (disambiguation) =

Law and Justice is a Polish political party.

Law and Justice may also refer to:

- Law and Justice (Croatia), a Croatian political party
- National Democracy (Czech Republic), a political party in the Czech Republic formerly named Law and Justice
- Law and Justice (Georgia), a Georgian political party
- Law & Justice (journal), a United Kingdom based academic legal periodical
- Law and Justice Division, a government division in Bangladesh
- Law and Justice Commission of Pakistan, a statutory authority of the government of Pakistan

== See also ==
- Law and Order
