= L&O =

L&O may refer to:

- Law & Order (franchise), a number of related television programs created by Dick Wolf
  - Law & Order (1990–2010, 2022–), an American police procedural and legal drama television series set in New York City
    - Law & Order: Dead on the Money, first in a series of computer games based on the television series Law & Order
    - Law & Order: Double or Nothing, second in a series of computer games based on the television series Law & Order
  - Law & Order: Special Victims Unit (1999–), an American police procedural television drama series set in New York City
  - Law & Order: Criminal Intent (2001–2011), an American police procedural television drama series set in New York City
  - Law & Order: Trial by Jury (2005–2006), an American television drama about criminal trials set in New York City
  - Law & Order: UK (2009–2014), a British police procedural and legal television programme set in London, England
  - Law & Order: LA (2010–2011), an American police procedural-legal television drama series set in Los Angeles, California
- Leigh & Orange, an international architectural and interior design practice
- Lexington and Ohio Railroad, the first railroad in the U.S. state of Kentucky
- Lorton and Occoquan Railroad, a seven-mile railroad line running between the Lorton Reformatory and Occoquan, Virginia
