= Murder, She Wrote (video game) =

2009 video game

- Developer: Legacy Games
- Publisher: Focus Multimedia
- Platforms: Microsoft Windows; Mac OS X (2011–present)
- Release: November 12, 2009
- Genres: Point-and-click adventure, puzzle
- Mode: Single-player

Murder, She Wrote is a 2009 episodic point-and-click adventure video game developed by Legacy Games, based on the 1984–1996 television series of the same name. Initially launched in late 2009, it saw widespread digital releases and retail distribution in 2010 for PC and Mac. The game features five murder mysteries that the player tackles through point-and-click puzzle solving methods. Although none of the actors from the original TV show lend their voice in the game, the likenesses of Angela Lansbury as Jessica Fletcher, William Windom as Dr. Seth Hazlitt, and Ron Masak as Sheriff Mort Metzger are used.

A sequel, Murder She Wrote 2: Return to Cabot Cove, was launched by Legacy Interactive in November 2012.

== Stories ==
A Deadly Catch: A local fisherman is found murdered on his boat, and Jessica's investigation reveals that there are more than lobsters being hauled in.

Murder in the Maples: While giving a guest lecture at a Vermont college, Jessica stops in a small town to visit an old friend, Maria Olsen, who runs a maple syrup business. However, when the dead body of one of Maria's former employees turns up in the syrup vat, Jessica must work her way through the sticky sweet layer of love, rivalry, and sabotage in order to uncover the sour truth.

A Garden to Die For: Cabot Cove's gardening competition is put on hold when one of the contestants ends up dead, and Jessica must weed through every clue to find the killer.

Ashes to Ashes: Just as Cabot Cove's city council prepares to renovate a house that's been abandoned for two years, the home's previous owner is found murdered inside, and a local rumor of a hidden fortune leads Jessica to wonder if a treasure hunter is to blame.

Final Curtain: Jessica visits her identical cousin, Emma MacGill, in London, and ends up in another investigation when a famous actress is found murdered in her dressing room.
