= Victor Brandt (actor) =

American actor

- Born: September 19, 1942 (age 83); Los Angeles, California, U.S.
- Occupation: Actor
- Years active: 1965–present

Victor Brandt (born September 19, 1942) is an American actor. He is known for voicing Emil Hamilton in Superman: The Animated Series and General Crozier in Metalocalypse.

== Early life ==
Brandt was born in Los Angeles, California.

== Career ==
Brandt has appeared as an actor in several classic shows such as Star Trek: The Original Series, Mission Impossible, and T. J. Hooker. He has provided voices for various shows, including the roles of Emil Hamilton in Superman: The Animated Series, Master Pakku in Avatar: The Last Airbender, Rupert Thorne in The Batman, and General Crozier in Metalocalypse.

== Filmography ==
=== Film ===
Year	Media	Role	Notes
1965	Battle of the Bulge	Actor	
1968	The Head Mistress	Mario	
1968	The Sunshine Patriot	Tibor	Television film
1974	Three the Hard Way	Guards	
1976	The Boy in the Plastic Bubble	TV Installer	Television film
1978	I Wanna Hold Your Hand	Theatre Cop	
1982	Wacko	Dr. Moroeu	
1989	Criminal Act	Lance Bellard	
1990	Another 48 Hrs.	District Attorney	
1990	83 Hours 'Til Dawn	Sorella	Television film
1993	Sliver	Detective McCracken	
1998	Babe: Pig in the City	Additional voices	
2002	The Santa Clause 2	Reindeer	
2003	The Cat in the Hat	Narrator	Voice
2013	Metalocalypse: The Doomstar Requiem	General Crozier	Voice, television film
2015	April and the Extraordinary World	Additional voices	English dub
2018	Mirai	Grandfather	Voice, English dub
2023	Metalocalypse: Army of the Doomstar	General Crozier	Voice, direct-to-video

=== Television ===
Year	Title	Role	Notes
1966–1968	Gomer Pyle, U.S.M.C.	Corporal Jensen	8 episodes
1968–1969	Star Trek: The Original Series	Watson, Tongo Rad	2 episodes: "Elaan of Troyius", "The Way to Eden"
1970	Mission Impossible	Doctor	Episode: "The Innocent"
1971	The Smith Family	Max	Episode: "All the Good Neighbors"
1973	The Odd Couple	Ramon	Episode: "The Odd Holiday"
1975–1976	The Rookies	Harry Towsend / Lawson	2 episodes
1982	T. J. Hooker	Billy Marks	Episode: "The Streets"
1984	Highway to Heaven	Hacker	2 episodes
1990–1991	They Came from Outer Space	Dad	20 episodes
1993	Murder, She Wrote	David Oesterman	Episode: "Killer Radio"
1994	Saved by the Bell	Mr. McMillan	2 episode
1995	Gargoyles	Rabbi Loew, Janus	Voice, episode: "Golem"
1996	Road Rovers	Eisnerian Ambassador	Voice, episode: "Where Rovers Dare"
1996–2000	Superman: The Animated Series	Professor Emil Hamilton	Voice, 14 episodes
1998–1999	Todd McFarlane's Spawn	Chief Banks, Agent #1	Voice, 5 episodes
1998	Godzilla: The Series	Hobo	Voice, episode: "Cat and Mouse"
2001	Totally Spies!	Vladimir Kozyrev	Voice, episode: "Child's Play"
2002	NYPD Blue	Ben Tyrell	Episode: "Low Blow"
2003	Spider-Man: The New Animated Series	Oscorp Executive	Voice, episode: "Heroes and Villains"
2003	My Life as a Teenage Robot	Mr. Mezmer, Jock #1	Voice, episode: "The Return of Raggedy Android"
2004	The Batman	Rupert Thorne	Voice, episode: "The Bat in the Belfry"
2005–2008	Avatar: The Last Airbender	Master Pakku	Voice, 6 episodes
2006–2013	Metalocalypse	General Crozier, Cardinal Ravenwood	Voice, 59 episodes
2011-2012	Star Wars: The Clone Wars	Keeper Agruss	Voice, 2 episodes
2016	Transformers: Robots in Disguise	Scorponok	Voice, 2 episodes
2017	We Bare Bears	Additional voices	Episode: "Panda's Art"
2019	Love, Death & Robots	Corporal Pogodin	Voice, episode: "The Secret War"

=== Video games ===
Year	Title	Role	Notes
1997	Men in Black: The Game	Agent K	
1999	Superman 64	Professor Emil Hamilton	
2002	Superman: Shadow of Apokolips	Professor Emil Hamilton	
2002	Law and Order: Dead on the Money	Douglas Wade	
2003	Law & Order: Double or Nothing	Douglas Wade	
2005	Jade Empire	Black Whirlwind, additional voices	
2006	Avatar: The Last Airbender	Additional voices	
2011	Iron Brigade	Vlad	
2013	StarCraft II: Heart of the Swarm	Alexei Stukov	
2015	Heroes of the Storm	Alexei Stukov	
2015	StarCraft II: Legacy of the Void	Alexei Stukov	
2016	World of Warcraft: Legion		
2017	Walden, a game	Horace Greeley, Bartleby the Clerk, Father	
2018	Red Dead Redemption 2	Additional voices	
