= Pet Pals: Animal Doctor =

2006 video game

- Australian box art
- Developers: Legacy Interactive; Frontline Studios (Wii)
- Publishers: Legacy Interactive (Wii, PC, Mac); Majesco (DS)
- Platforms: macOS, Nintendo DS, Wii, Windows
- Release: December 2006: Windows/Macintosh December 2006 Nintendo DS; NA: February 7, 2008 Wii; NA: November 11, 2008; PAL: November 14, 2008
- Genre: Simulation

Pet Pals: Animal Doctor is a video game created by Legacy Interactive in which the player is a veterinarian, and must take care of 35 animals brought to their clinic. In the Wii version, the player takes care of 30 animals. It is rated E10+ by the American Entertainment Software Rating Board. In Europe, the game was released under the name "Real Adventures - Pet Vet".

In 2007, it was given the "Silver Honor" award by the Parents' Choice Foundation.

== Notes ==
- If you get 1000 points in a case, you get a perfect score trophy.
- If you do something wrong, incorrectly diagnose the animal, and ask the wrong questions, you won't get a trophy.

== See also ==
- Zoo Vet
