= Fabrizio Boccardi =

Italian businessman

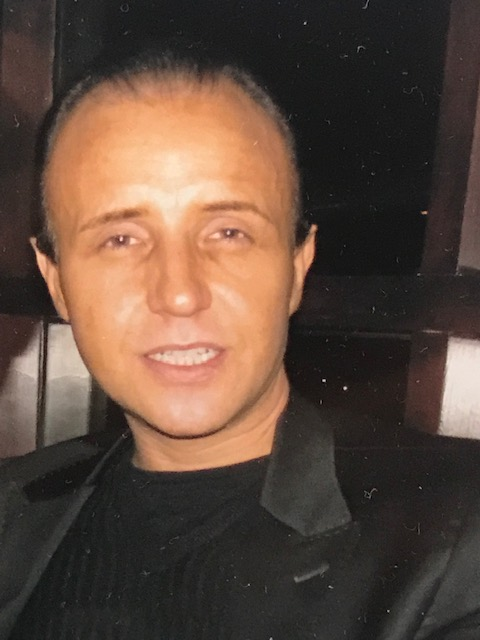
- Born: Milan, Italy
- Occupations: Entrepreneur, investor, producer

Fabrizio Boccardi is an Italian-American entrepreneur and investor. He is known for his investments and ventures in real estate, hospitality, media and technology. Boccardi created a fictional character "The Tyrant", a Las Vegas Casino owner, who has been the subject of two books and rumored deals for comics and movie franchises. Boccardi has attempted to buy control of a Las Vegas casino and has announced intentions to create a casino and gaming franchise based on the fictional character. In the technology sector he is known for his ventures and investments in new technology for commerce.

== Early life ==
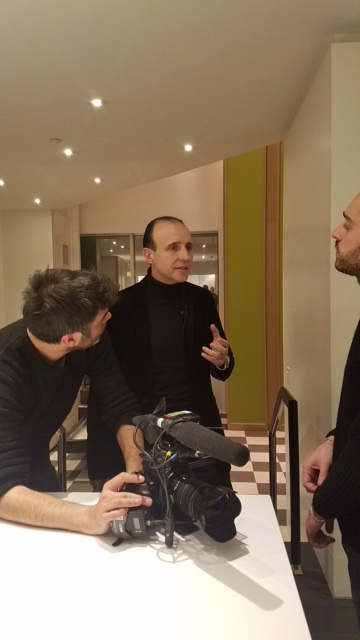
Boccardi during a March 2018 TV interview in Las Vegas.

Boccardi was born in Milan, Italy; his father Giampiero Boccardi, was a businessman in Italy with holdings in construction, insurance and financial services. Boccardi attended the Leone XIII school in Milan, and then the Ophenaimer. He continued his studies in the United States, attending Villanova Preparatory School, in Ojai, California, but was unable to finish his junior year when his family's holding company's collapsed and finished school in Italy.

Boccardi invested in condominium development in the South of France before moving to Las Vegas in 2000.

== Property investment ==
Boccardi has attempted to buy a Las Vegas casino, since 1999. At that time, he signed an agreement to buy the New Frontier Hotel & Casino on the Las Vegas Strip, for $270 million owned at the time by Phil Ruffin. The price Boccardi was willing to pay in 1999 for the aged New Frontier Hotel & Casino, was considered too high by the lenders and gaming analysts as a result Boccardi was forced to pull out during due diligence and terminate the agreement with Ruffin. Phil Ruffin sold the New Frontier to El Ad Properties in 2007 at more than $1.2 billion, the 36 Frontier acres sold for more than $33 million an acre.

In 2000, Boccardi offered $200 million for the Desert Inn Hotel & Casino, but his offer was considered too low by owners Starwood Hotel & Resorts and was then sold to Las Vegas casino owner Steve Wynn for $275 million. To publicize his bid for the Desert Inn, Boccardi invited Prince Albert of Monaco to Las Vegas.

In 2003, Boccardi bid $8.50 per share for control of Riviera Holdings, owners of the Riviera Hotel & Casino on the Las Vegas Strip and a casino in Black Hawk, Colorado. Boccardi's offer caused the stock of the company to increase substantially. The offer was subject to a change of ‘control put’ and bondholders’ approval of the debt holders of the public company trading on the American Stock Exchange. Management rejected the offer, causing some shareholders to file suit against Riviera's management for not considering the offer. Boccardi in an interview with the Wall Street Journal claimed that if successful buying the Riveria it would be rebranded as The Seven Sins.

=== Seven Sins Megaresort ===
Boccardi has announced plans to use his media properties such as Tiranno, Tyrant and Tyrant Knight to launch a global gaming and hospitality brand which will include the construction of the Seven Sins Megaresort, the same casino depicted in the Michael Tiranno the Tyrant book series, films and comics. In an interview with Robin Leach via the Review Journal in 2017, Boccardi confirmed that the timing for his casino and hospitality plans to be realized will be primarily determined by the level of success of the film The Seven Sins.

== Litigation ==
In April 2004, DE Shaw Laminar Portfolios announced in its filings with the Securities and Exchange Commission (SEC) pending strategic discussions with Boccardi regarding the Riviera Casino, and bought 10% in Riviera Holdings from Donald Trump. In May 2004, in subsequent filings with the SEC, DE Shaw Laminar Portfolios announced the termination of its discussions with Boccardi regarding Riviera Holdings.

In 2005 Boccardi Capital Systems filed suit in the United States District Court for the Southern District of New York in Manhattan, against DE Shaw Laminar Portfolios for breach of contract and other allegations in connection with Riviera Holdings, asking for compensation of approximately $140 million. The suit was finally dismissed in February 2009, and despite an appeal that Boccardi Capital filed immediately thereafter, the judgment was reaffirmed in December 2009 by the United States Court of Appeals, Second Circuit.

Twentieth Century Fox and King Midas World Entertainment reached a settlement in 2014 regarding the TYRANT Mark. Both parties called on to refrain from challenging each other's mark, with FX's “Tyrant” TV series based on the story of an American family drawn into Middle Eastern turmoil, and King Midas’ “Tyrant” a Las Vegas-based superhero property created by Boccardi.

== Venture capital ==
Boccardi is also a venture capitalist and technology entrepreneur. Through several of his controlled entities he provides capital in business ventures in the US and elsewhere.

== Technology ==
Boccardi is engaged in the technology sector through his involvement with Astral Dynamic Networks, also known as Astradyne Inc. Boccardi focuses on artificial intelligence, blockchain technology and other tech innovations aiming to advance technology in commerce and social interactions for the populace via new products with new capabilities.

Boccardi is engaged in the development of advanced technologies centered on secure communications, modular computing architectures, and artificial intelligence. His initiatives prioritize scalability, privacy, and cross-platform interoperability, with the goal of enhancing the foundational infrastructure for next-generation digital ecosystems.

== Fictional character ==
The Tyrant Knight is Boccardi's franchised fictional character, first appearing in 2008 in the book "The Seven Sins: The Tyrant Ascending," written by Jon Land and published by Macmillan. Boccardi worked with Land to create the story, which is loosely inspired by Boccardi's own life.

In 2008, The Seven Sins: The Tyrant Ascending was published by Forge Books/Saint Martin's Press. The Library Journal selected The Seven Sins: The Tyrant Ascending as a "Best Thriller of 2008."

The second book in the series titled "Black Scorpion The Tyrant Reborn" was published in North America by Macmillan Publishing Group on April 7, 2015, written by Jon Land and created by Boccardi.

DC Entertainment is developing the comics based on a publishing license provided to DC by King Midas World Entertainment. Comic Artists such as Andrea Mutti have been engaged to work on the comic property.

A production for a feature film is in development in Hollywood based on the franchised character of Michael Tiranno, the Tyrant Knight. The film will be based on the blended adaptation of Black Scorpion and its predecessor, The Seven Sins, which both have also been licensed to DC Comics for comic books and graphic novels publications. In 2017, director Chuck Russell was attached to direct and help to write the screenplay for the film titled "The Seven Sins: Dawn of the Tyrant Knight".

=== Other media properties ===
Boccardi created a media property named Dark Light Dawn. The first book in the series was announced for publication in North America by Macmillan Publishing Group on August 1, 2017. The book is written by Jon Land and created and owned by Boccardi. Inspired by geopolitical events, rising terrorism, and religious conflicts, the novel meshes a paranormal tale with the action horror thriller genre.
