= Edmund Plowden (disambiguation) =

Edmund Plowden was a lawyer.

Edmund Plowden may also refer to:

- Edmund Plowden (colonial governor), Lord Proprietor, Earl Palatine, Governor and Captain General of the province of New Albion
- Edmund Plowden Trust, publishers of Law & Justice (journal)
