= The Seven Sins: The Tyrant Ascending =

2008 novel by Jon Land

- Author: Jon Land
- Language: English
- Genre: Thriller/Mystery
- Publisher: Forge
- Publication date: 2008
- Publication place: United States
- Followed by: Black Scorpion: The Tyrant Reborn

The Seven Sins: The Tyrant Ascending is a 2008 novel by Jon Land and the first book in the Michael Tiranno series. The book tells the story of Michael Tiranno, beginning with his harsh childhood in Sicily to his rise to success in Las Vegas. A second novel, entitled Black Scorpion: The Tyrant Reborn, was released in 2015

The series is loosely modeled on Fabrizio Boccardi.

== Synopsis ==
The novel follows Michael Tiranno (Tiranno meaning "tyrant" in Italian), a wealthy and powerful Las Vegas casino owner. He's partially fueled his success to a strange, mysterious gold medallion he possesses that has the phrase "To Dream...To Dare..To Win..." inscribed on it in Latin. Michael wasn't always successful - at one point he was an orphan that had to undergo a tough childhood. This drove him to pursue wealth and power, no matter what the cost. This has caused him to make enemies, one of which is now set on ruining everything that he has built for himself.

== Adaptations ==
=== Comic ===
On June 14, 2011 King Midas World Entertainment announced that DC Comics had licensed the worldwide rights to the series, with the intent to publish graphic novels and periodicals.

=== Film ===
Shortly after the book's release in 2008 the film rights were purchased by producers Moritz Borman and Peter Graves. In 2010 King Midas World Entertainment announced that they had signed screenwriter Christopher Kyle to adapt the novel into a screenplay. In May 2017, famed Cult Classic favorite and blockbuster film Director Chuck Russell was attached to work on the screenplay and direct the film. The film will be based on an adaptation of the two books.

== Reception ==
The Las Vegas Weekly wrote a mixed review, criticizing Land for his lack of consistency but writing "what Land lacks in consistency, he more than makes up for in harmless thrills. Go ahead—enjoy the hell out of this book, and hate yourself later." The Library Journal was more favorable in their review, writing that the book would "enthrall all thrill seekers" and including it in their list of best thrillers of 2008.

== Other books in the series ==
In 2014 the sequel Black Scorpion was released through MacMillan Books. It recorded the further adventures of Tiranno and was positively received.
