= Starman (TV series) =

1986–1987 American sci-fi TV series

- Genre: Science fiction
- Based on: 1984 film of the same name by Bruce A. Evans & Raynold Gideon
- Developed by: James Henerson; James Hirsch; Mike Gray; John Mason
- Written by: Michael Marks; Mike Gray; John Mason; Randall Wallace
- Directed by: Bill Duke; Robert Chenault; Bob Dahlin; Mike Gray; Robert Hays; Nancy Malone; Nick Marck; Bob Sweeney
- Starring: Robert Hays; Christopher Daniel Barnes; Michael Cavanaugh; Patrick Culliton
- Composers: Dana Kaproff; Jack Nitzsche
- Country of origin: United States
- Original language: English
- No. of seasons: 1
- No. of episodes: 22

Production
- Executive producers: Michael Douglas; James S. Henerson; James G. Hirsch
- Producers: Mike Gray; John Mason
- Running time: 60 mins. (approx)
- Production companies: Michael Douglas Productions; Henerson/Hirsch Productions; Columbia Pictures Television

Original release
- Network: ABC
- Release: September 19, 1986 – May 2, 1987

Related
- Starman

Starman is an American science fiction television series starring Robert Hays and Christopher Daniel Barnes which continues the story from the 1984 film of the same name. The series aired on ABC from September 19, 1986, to May 2, 1987.

== Storyline ==
Christopher Daniel Barnes (left) as Scott Hayden Jr. and Robert Hays as Paul Forrester.

The series takes place fifteen years after the film's story and features the return of the alien as a clone of deceased photojournalist Paul Forrester (Robert Hays) to meet and guide his now-teenage son Scott Hayden Jr. (Christopher Daniel Barnes) as they try to avoid a U.S. government agent and find the missing Jenny Hayden, Scott's mother.

Each episode of the series has the fugitive father and son moving from place to place meeting people that are in need of some assistance, while Scott tries to explain to his alien father what it means to be a human being as Starman is forced to deal with fallout from Forrester's rather hedonistic past. Each has a small silvery sphere of alien material that allows them to project thoughts to carry out telekinesis or telepathy in some limited manner.

Starman and Scott are pursued by government UFO investigator George Fox (Michael Cavanaugh), who regards both father and son as a threat to humanity and will not tolerate them running free in society.

In a two-part episode, "Starscape", Starman and Scott find Jenny Hayden (Erin Gray) living as an artist, under the name Karen Iseley, in Arizona. One more episode, "The Test", aired after the two-part episode, trying to pave the way for a second season, but the series was canceled.

== Cast ==
- Robert Hays as Paul Forrester / Starman
- Christopher Daniel Barnes as Scott Hayden Jr.
- Michael Cavanaugh as George Fox
- Patrick Culliton as FSA Agent Wylie

== Production ==
Robert Hays accepted the lead role in the series just as his one-year contract with Columbia Pictures Television was set to expire. According to Hays, rather than do a traditional pilot Columbia instead produced a 20 minute presentation showing the look and feel the series would go for describing it as being in the vein of The Fugitive and The Invaders. ABC gave the series a half-season order which they would air on Friday nights at 10PM opposite CBS' Falcon Crest and NBC's L.A. Law.

== Critical reception ==
Starman scored a critics' rating of 34 out of 100 on Metacritic, based on 5 "generally unfavorable" reviews. These ranged from The Miami Herald calling it "warm and funny" to the Los Angeles Times stating, "Brother, is this a drag".

== Episodes ==
No.	Title	Directed by	Written by	Original release date
1	"The Return"	Charles S. Dubin	James Henerson & James Hirsch	September 19, 1986
Following his foster parents' death, a grieving Scott Hayden Jr (Christopher Daniel Barnes) uses a sphere and inadvertently contacts his alien father, the Starman (Robert Hays), calling him back to Earth. Starman clones the body of the reckless photojournalist Paul Forrester, who was killed in a helicopter crash while trying to photograph an erupting volcano. George Fox (Michael Cavanaugh), already investigating Scott, learns of the alien's return through Liz Baynes (Mimi Kuzyk), an investigative reporter who often worked with the real Paul and was one of his many lovers. Scott, forced to believe his father's identity when he hears a tape from Jenny Hayden, his biological mother, sets out to find her. Starman, as Paul, accompanies him to protect them both from government agents. Liz offers to help Paul find work as a photographer.
2	"Like Father, Like Son"	Nancy Malone	Geoffrey Fischer	September 26, 1986
Scott has trouble accepting his father's origins and what that means for his own life. Rather than hitchhiking on their journey, they instead decide to buy a used car. Afterward, they pick up a stressed-out woman (Candy Clark) and her daughter (Robyn Lively). After taking the car to a garage and staying the night at a hotel, Scott and Paul learn the police are after the mother for kidnapping. Meanwhile, Fox is trying to rally the government for the support he needs.
3	"Fatal Flaw"	Robert Chenault	Mike Gray & John Mason	October 3, 1986
Scott and Paul hide out at an airfield, where they meet a pilot (Patricia McPherson) who had been designing a new plane with her father until he suffered a stroke that left him unable to speak. Seeing her failing financial situation, Paul uses his sphere to communicate with her father, who points out some flaws in the plane's design. Scott begins to appreciate his father's abilities.
4	"Blue Lights"	Claudio Guzman	Tom Lazarus	October 10, 1986
Scott erroneously uses his sphere to cause blue lights to appear in the sky. Father and son end up in a jail cell, while the sheriff tries to convince everyone of the story. However, only the government and Fox are interested.
5	"Best Buddies"	Charles S. Dubin	Leon Tokatyan	October 24, 1986
Starman finds it difficult to resume Paul's life when he meets a couple, Paul's Vietnam veteran buddy and his wife, who declares she still loves Paul and wishes to resume their affair.
6	"Secrets"	Bob Sweeney	Randall Wallace	October 31, 1986
Paul and Scott hear a news report that someone named Jennifer Hayden has escaped from a nearby mental hospital, a ruse arranged by Fox. They enlist the aid of an actress (Lisa Blount), who is more interested in Paul than in finding Jenny whom she says she knows. Meanwhile, another false news report leads Scott into a trap.
7	"One for the Road"	Claudio Guzman	Michael Marks	November 7, 1986
Becoming tired of being on the lam, Paul and Scott stay in a town for a while. Scott joins the school's track team and falls in love with schoolmate Kelly Jordan (Ami Dolenz). When Paul suggests that it is time for them to leave town, Scott rebels.
8	"Peregrine"	Robert Chenault	Geoffrey Fischer	November 14, 1986
Paul sees both sides of the captive breeding program for endangered species when he heals the broken wing of a peregrine falcon he calls Waldo. He also makes his first intentional joke and learns an important lesson about being human. Paul and Scott befriend a veterinarian (Margaret Klenck) and stay with her as they work for her.
9	"Society's Pet"	Claudio Guzman	Ross Hirshorn	November 28, 1986
Antonia Weyburn (Janet Leigh), the very wealthy sister of Scott's foster father, uses a $10,000 insurance policy to lure Paul and Scott to her farm. Willing even to strike a bargain with Fox, she wants to remove Scott from what she considers Paul's bad influence and properly raise him. When he sees how much Scott savors the luxury offered him, Paul wonders if his son might not prefer such an arrangement.
10	"Fever"	Bill Duke	Tom Lazarus	December 5, 1986
A common cold endangers Starman's life, leaving him vulnerable to Fox, who has been relieved of duty for not finding tangible proof of the alien's existence. Scott realizes how important his father has become.
11	"The Gift"	Mike Gray	Peggy Goldman	December 12, 1986
Accepting an invitation to spend Christmas with the real Paul Forrester's mother (Jane Wyatt), Paul and Scott find she did not invite them and does not want to see her son. After learning she is dying, Starman tries to explain his own view of death to Scott and to heal the wounds between Paul and his mother before it is too late.
12	"The System"	Bill Duke	Steven Hollander	January 9, 1987
Starman gets arrested on a bench warrant for Paul, who refused to violate the confidence of a fugitive from justice he had photographed. Fox eventually learns of this and tries to get Paul but the police stonewall him. Then, a mistake gets Paul released and he thinks he can find the location in the photograph.
13	"Appearances"	Nick Marck	Story by : Michael Marks & Joe Goodson; Teleplay by : Michael Marks	January 16, 1987
Starman heals the acid-burned hand of a sheltered blind girl (Nadine Van der Velde), who then believes him to be a healer and cannot understand why he will not also heal her eyes.
14	"The Probe"	Mike Gray	Syrie Astrahan James	January 30, 1987
Paul falls in love with a beautiful widowed astronomer (Kay Lenz), who is struggling with the issue of military funding for scientific research.
15	"Dusty"	Claudio Guzman	Peggy Goldman	February 6, 1987
A compulsive gambler steals Paul and Scott's car, stranding them in Reno with an $8,000 debt and without their belongings.
16	"Barriers"	Mike Gray	Michael Marks	February 13, 1987
Knocked unconscious, Paul gets taken to Mexico, separated from Scott, and imprisoned by the father of Tonita, a pregnant aristocrat. Paul must escape, cross the border with other "illegal aliens", and protect Tonita from bandits as she goes into labor on the way to find her baby's father.
17	"Grifters"	Claudio Guzman	Steven Hollander	March 13, 1987
Two con men try to scam Paul and Scott, who ultimately find themselves in the clutches of Fox. Starman learns the extent of Fox's hatred, paranoia and plans for Scott.
18	"The Wedding"	Nick Marck	Geoffrey Fischer	March 21, 1987
The owner (Al Ruscio) of a fishing fleet and cannery asks Paul to photograph his daughter Anna's (Christine Healy) wedding, but her father actually hopes being reminded of a past love affair with Paul will make Anna change her mind about marriage and leaving home.
19	"Fathers and Sons"	Ted Lange	Syrie Astrahan James	March 28, 1987
A 15-year-old boy who believes Paul Forrester was his biological father wants to escape his current life and go on the road with Paul. Scott, feeling irritated in his own father-son relationship, is indifferent with the boy. Meanwhile, Paul has been hired by a magazine publisher to expose some former activists who might have sold out.
20	"Starscape, Part 1"	Claudio Guzman	James Henerson & James Hirsch	April 4, 1987
Paul recognizes his home star in a painting, and he and Scott search for the artist, Jenny Hayden (Erin Gray). Separated in New Mexico, they both head for Arizona, where Paul finds his lost love, but is not quite sure how to reveal his identity. Meanwhile, Scott's involved in a truck crash in an isolated area and saves the driver, not realizing the man is his uncle.
21	"Starscape, Part 2"	Claudio Guzman	James Henerson & James Hirsch	April 11, 1987
Jenny initially finds it difficult to believe the identity of her new love, but they reaffirm their bond and focus on finding Scott. Fox captures both father and son, but Jenny's brother aids in their escape from the Air Force lab. During the pursuit, Fox has a heart attack. Starman ponders the best solution so he can have a life with the family he loves, which is whether to let Fox die or not.
22	"The Test"	Robert Hays	Laurie Newbound	May 2, 1987
Scott faces a trio of bullies in school, while Paul presents two people with the opportunity to change their lives, a disillusioned teacher and a man who has yet to face his illiteracy.

== Awards and nominations ==
Starman was nominated twice in 1987 for the Young Artist Award. The series received a nomination for Best Family Television Drama, and its co-star Christopher Daniel Barnes received a nomination for Best Young Actor Starring in a Television Drama Series.
