= Ghost Whisperer (video game) =

2012 video game

- Developer: Legacy Games
- Publisher: Legacy Games
- Platforms: Microsoft Windows, Mac OS X
- Release: 7 August 2012
- Genre: Hidden object
- Mode: Single-player

Ghost Whisperer is a casual hidden-object mystery adventure game developed by Legacy Games for Microsoft Windows and Mac OS. The Mac version was released in October 2012, requiring Mac OS X 10.5 or later. The game is based on the CBS supernatural television show Ghost Whisperer starring Jennifer Love Hewitt (Melinda Gordon). The game contains two different cases to solve: "Forgotten Toys" and "A Brush with Death".

== Story ==
In Forgotten Toys, an elderly toy mogul is found abandoned in his mansion with a ghost as his only companion. Team up with Melinda Gordon as she communicates with the ghost to solve the mystery.

In the second case, A Brush with Death, Melinda and Delia Banks investigate a haunted painting on loan to the Grandview art museum. A wealthy family in Grandview is having mysterious ghost trouble and only you can help them.

== Characters ==
Melinda (Jennifer Love Hewitt) is the main character in Ghost Whisperer. She has a very special ability to see and communicate with ghosts and souls who are stuck between two worlds in limbo, due to some unresolved issue. Melinda helps them find peace and cross over into the light. She also owns an antique shop and lives in the small town of Grandview, New York.

Jim Clancy (David Conrad) is Melinda’s loving husband. He is a paramedic who met Melinda when he rescued her from her burning apartment complex. Jim has known about Melinda's unique ability to communicate with ghosts for years and helps her whenever he can.

Eli James (Jamie Kennedy) is a teacher at Rockland University who developed the ability to hear ghosts after he was burned to death in an accident on campus and subsequently brought back from the dead. Due to this experience, he can now hear ghosts, but he can’t see them as Melinda does. Eli has adjusted to his newfound ability and assists Melinda in her mission to help restless souls find peace.

Delia Banks (Camryn Manheim) is Melinda’s best friend and works at her antique shop, Same As It Never Was. She lives in Grandview with her teenage son, Ned. Although in the past Delia has been skeptical about Melinda’s ability to communicate with spirits, she now understands Melinda’s gift and frequently helps her.

== Gameplay ==
Ghost Whisperer is a hidden-object game in which the player assumes the role of Melinda Gordon and is tasked with solving the paranormal mysteries taking place. There are two missions or “cases,” each with a unique storyline. While progressing through each case, the player frequently encounters various obstacles that must be cleared in order to progress further. These obstacles sometimes merely need to be “unlocked” using items that the player finds on the way, but they may also appear in the form of puzzles. By passing these obstacles, the player comes closer and closer to resolving each case as more story elements become revealed, culminating with the final, surprising resolution to the story.
