= The Tuttles Madcap Misadventures =

- Developer: Legacy Interactive
- Publisher: Legacy Interactive
- Platform: Windows
- Release: 2007; March 2008(retail version)
- Genre: Action

The Tuttles Madcap Misadventures, also known as The Tuttles Madcap Misadventures: Starlight Charity Challenge, is a 2007 video game from Legacy Interactive.

== Gameplay ==
The Tuttles Madcap Misadventures follows the Tuttle family as they set out on a road trip to the Alamo, progressing through a side‑scrolling platform adventure. Players move through 40 levels spread across six environments, including areas such as a desert, ocean, jungle, mountain, and island. Throughout the journey, the family travels either on foot or aboard their flying mini‑van, with each of the four family members becoming playable at different points. Levels are filled with hazards typical of platforming stages, and animated cut‑scenes appear between segments to advance the story. Voice performances from several well‑known actors accompany the narrative as players continue through the sequence of environments and challenges.

== Development ==
The Tuttles Madcap Misadventures was announced in August 2007. The retail version was released in March 2008.

At least half of the proceeds of The Tuttles Madcap Misadventures went to Starlight Children's Foundation's charity.

== Reception ==
Reception

Review scores
Publication	Score
Baxter Bulletin	4/5
Common Sense Media	4/5
Softpedia	8/10
Tech With Kids	4/5

Gamezebo called The Tuttles Madcap Misadventures fun and colorful and keeps the player interested in the family's adventure. Baxter Bulletin praised the voice talent.
