= List of Murder, She Wrote novels =

Over the course of the long-running Murder, She Wrote television series, fictional mystery author turned sleuth, Jessica Fletcher, played by actress Angela Lansbury, publishes a series of fictional novels under the pen name J. B. Fletcher. In the pilot episode, "The Murder of Sherlock Holmes", we witness her rise to fame following the release of her first novel, The Corpse Danced at Midnight. The book would later be made into a movie in the episode "Hooray for Homicide". Her book A Murder Comes to Maine becomes the basis of a Broadway play in the episode "Deadpan". Her book A Killing at Hastings Rock undergoes development to become a virtual reality video game in the episode "A Virtual Murder".

The title The Stain on the Stairs, mentioned in the episode "The Days Dwindle Down", had previously been used by author Agatha Christie in The Murder at the Vicarage as the title of a supposed detective story.

In keeping with the spirit of the television show, a series of official original novels have been written and published. The co-author credited for all of the novels is the fictitious "Jessica Fletcher". The first novel, Gin & Daggers, originally published in 1989, authored by American ghostwriter Donald Bain, included several inaccuracies to the television series including Jessica driving a car which she could not do as she never learned to drive. Due to fans pointing out the errors, the novel was republished in 2000 with most of the inaccuracies corrected.

== Fictional novels ==
The following is a list of novels that were written by the fictional character of Jessica Fletcher (J. B. Fletcher) and were mentioned in the context of the episode storylines of the television series:

- The Corpse Danced at Midnight
- Dirge for a Dead Dachshund
- A Faded Rose Beside Her
- Murder on the Amazon
- The Umbrella Murders
- Murder at the Inn
- Murder at the Digs
- Murder in a Minor Key
- The Stain on the Stairs
- The Mystery of the Mutilated Minion
- The Belgrade Murders
- Sanitarium of Death
- Calvin Canterbury's Revenge
- Murder at the Asylum
- Murder Comes to Maine
- Ashes, Ashes, Fall Down Dead
- Goodbye, Charlie
- Yours Truly, Damian Sinclair
- The Corpse That Wasn't There
- The Messengers of Midnight
- The Poison in My Heart
- All the Murderers
- Murder at the Ridge Top
- The Corpse Swam by Moonlight
- The Killer Called Collect
- The Corpse at Vespers
- The Triple Crown Murders
- The Crypt of Death
- A Killing at Hastings Rock
- The Uncaught
- Murder in White
- The Dead Man Sang
- Stone Cold Dead on Wall Street
- Endangered
- The Launch Pad Murders
- Runway to Murder
- The Venomous Valentine
- A Case and a Half of Murder
- The Zero Aspect

== Novelizations ==
A number of episodes were the basis for a series of novels released in the mid 1980s by Avon Books. The first three books in the series are written by James Anderson and the fourth is written by David Deutsch. Each book, with the exception of The Murder of Sherlock Holmes, utilizes two episodes from the show as the basis for its story.

James Anderson

1. The Murder of Sherlock Holmes (April 1985)
  - based on the two-hour pilot episode of the same name.
2. Hooray for Homicide (November 1985)
  - based on the episodes "Deadly Lady" and "Hooray for Homicide".
3. Lovers and Other Killers (February 1986)
  - based on the episodes "Lovers and Other Killers" and "It's a Dog's Life".

David Deutsch

4. Murder in Two Acts (April 17, 1986)
  - based on the episodes "Sing a Song of Murder" and "Murder in the Afternoon".

== Spin-off novels ==
The following are novels inspired by the series, which are published by imprints for the current parent company, Penguin Random House. Donald Bain began writing the series in 1989 and continued authoring the books until his death in 2017. Bain's wife, Renée Paley-Bain (1945–2016), participated in writing the books beginning in 2002, and received a co-author credit for the final three books on which she worked. After Bain's death in 2017, author Jon Land was approached to take over the series. Land would go on to author six books in the series.

In 2020, it was revealed that author Terrie Farley Moran would be taking over the series beginning in 2021. In June 2024, it was announced that author Barbara Early would pen two Murder, She Wrote books; the first appearing in early 2025, with an additional book in 2026. Moran is expected to release two new titles following Early's release in 2025, as well as an additional book in 2026, again, after the publication of Early's.

The book series has also been translated and published in Italian, French, and Czech.

Jessica Fletcher and Donald Bain

1. Gin & Daggers (June 1989)
  - Second edition (Note: Author Donald Bain released a revised second edition in April 2000, omitting passages which had Jessica Fletcher driving a car.) (April 2000)
2. Manhattans & Murder (December 1994)
3. Rum & Razors (April 1995)
4. Brandy & Bullets (August 1995)
5. Martinis & Mayhem (December 1995)
6. A Deadly Judgment (April 1996)
7. A Palette for Murder (October 1996)
8. The Highland Fling Murders (April 1997)
9. Murder on the QE2 (October 1997)
10. Murder in Moscow (May 1998)
11. A Little Yuletide Murder (October 1998)
12. Murder at the Powderhorn Ranch (May 1999)
13. Knock 'em Dead (October 1999)
14. Trick or Treachery (October 1, 2000)
15. Blood on the Vine (April 2001)
16. Murder in a Minor Key (October 2001)
17. Provence – To Die For (April 2002)
18. You Bet Your Life (October 2002)
19. Majoring in Murder (April 2003)
20. Destination Murder (October 7, 2003)
21. Dying to Retire (April 6, 2004)
22. A Vote for Murder (October 5, 2004)
23. The Maine Mutiny (April 5, 2005)
24. Margaritas & Murder (October 4, 2005)
25. A Question of Murder (April 4, 2006)
26. Three Strikes and You're Dead (October 3, 2006)
27. Coffee, Tea, or Murder? (April 3, 2007)
28. Panning for Murder (September 25, 2007)
29. Murder on Parade (April 1, 2008)
30. A Slaying in Savannah (September 30, 2008)
31. Madison Avenue Shoot (April 7, 2009)
32. A Fatal Feast (October 6, 2009)
33. Nashville Noir (April 6, 2010)
34. The Queen's Jewels (October 5, 2010)
35. Skating on Thin Ice (April 5, 2011)
36. The Fine Art of Murder (October 4, 2011)
37. Trouble at High Tide (April 3, 2012)
38. Domestic Malice (October 2, 2012)
39. Prescription for Murder (April 2, 2013)
40. Close-Up on Murder (October 1, 2013)
41. Aloha Betrayed (April 1, 2014)
42. Death of a Blue Blood (October 7, 2014)
43. Killer in the Kitchen (April 7, 2015)

Jessica Fletcher and Donald Bain with Renée Paley-Bain

44. The Ghost and Mrs. Fletcher (October 6, 2015)
45. Design for Murder (April 5, 2016)
46. Hook, Line, and Murder (October 4, 2016)

Jessica Fletcher and Donald Bain with Jon Land

47. A Date with Murder (May 1, 2018)

Jessica Fletcher and Jon Land

48. Manuscript for Murder (November 6, 2018)
49. Murder in Red (May 28, 2019)
50. A Time for Murder (November 26, 2019)
51. The Murder of Twelve (May 26, 2020)
52. Murder in Season (November 24, 2020)

Jessica Fletcher and Terrie Farley Moran

53. Killing in a Koi Pond (June 8, 2021)
54. Debonair in Death (November 2, 2021)
55. Killer on the Court (May 17, 2022)
56. Death on the Emerald Isle (January 3, 2023)
57. Fit for Murder (January 23, 2024)
58. Murder Backstage (April 2, 2024)
59. A Killer Christmas (October 8, 2024)

Jessica Fletcher and Barbara Early

60. Snowy with a Chance of Murder (March 18, 2025)

Jessica Fletcher and Terrie Farley Moran

61. A Body in Boston (July 1, 2025)
62. The Body in the Trees (December 2, 2025)

Jessica Fletcher and Barbara Early

63. Murder Most Trivial (May 12, 2026)

Jessica Fletcher and Terrie Farley Moran

64. A Killing in Real Estate (December 8, 2026)

Jessica Fletcher and Barbara Early

65. Only Murders in the Castle (May 17, 2027)

== Anthologies ==
Beginning in 1997, a series of three anthologies were released, each featuring a number of stories by different authors. While none of the stories tied into the series (save for one story by Charlaine Harris in the first book, with Jessica Fletcher as a supporting character), each book was captioned as "Jessica Fletcher presents...", with the fictitious character being credited as the author of the book's introduction and making a short comment at the start of each story.

1. Murder, They Wrote (1997)
2. Murder, They Wrote II (1998)
3. More Murder, They Wrote (1999)

== Young Adult novels ==
A trilogy featuring Jessica's great-grandniece Beatrice "Bea" Fletcher (the granddaughter of Grady and Donna Fletcher), who becomes involved in solving cold cases.

1. By the Time You Read This I'll Be Gone by Stephanie Kuehn (October 5, 2022)
2. Carry My Secret to Your Grave by Stephanie Kuehn (October 31, 2023)
3. The Dead Will Never Haunt Me by Stephanie Kuehn (October 1, 2024)
