= Vet Emergency 2 =

2002 video game

- Developer: Legacy Interactive
- Publisher: Legacy Interactive
- Platforms: Windows, Mac OS
- Release: NA: November 26, 2002
- Genre: Simulation
- Mode: Single-player

Vet Emergency 2 is a PC CD-ROM computer game in which the player is a veterinarian and must take care of animals, earning points for treatment and efficiency. It was created by Legacy Interactive, and is the sequel to Vet Emergency.
