= Emergency Room (series) =

- Cover art for the original game (1995)
- Genre: Simulation
- Developers: Legacy Software (original game); Legacy Interactive (subsequent games)
- Publishers: Legacy Software (original game); Legacy Interactive (subsequent games)
- Platforms: MS-DOS, Macintosh, Windows, Nintendo DS
- First release: Emergency Room; 1995
- Latest release: Emergency Room: Heroic Measures; April 23, 2010

Emergency Room is a simulation video game series in which the player assumes the role of a medical person who treats hospital patients. The first game, Emergency Room, was released for MS-DOS in 1995. It was developed and published by Legacy Software, which created additional games in the series as Legacy Interactive Inc. beginning in 1999. The subsequent games were released for Macintosh and Microsoft Windows up until 2001, and a Nintendo DS game was released in 2009. The eighth and final game in the series, Emergency Room: Heroic Measures, was released in 2010.

== Video games ==
=== Emergency Room (1995) ===
Emergency Room was developed and published by Legacy Software, and was released for MS-DOS in 1995. Set in an emergency room at Legacy Memorial Hospital, the player takes control of a rookie medical student who reviews patients' charts and performs various procedures to diagnose and treat illnesses and injuries. Procedures used to make a diagnosis include checking patients' blood pressure and pulse, and multiple-choice options are presented to the player throughout the game. The game features 400 medical cases with various levels of severity. The player is guided by the hospital staff, which provides advice on medical decisions. The game was produced by Dr. Ariella Lehrer, a cognitive psychologist and the eventual founder and chief executive officer of Legacy Interactive Inc.

Emergency Room sold over 230,000 copies. Ken Neville of Entertainment Weekly gave the game a "C−" and criticized its simplicity, noting the player's inability to question patients to determine their ailments. Neville concluded that people who enjoy pretending to be doctors are "best advised to watch television's ER, because this Emergency Room makes you want to pull the plug." The Miami Herald stated that the game offers "a realistic experience in a hospital ER without the threat of a malpractice suit."

=== Emergency Room 2 (1999) ===
Emergency Room 2 was developed and published by Legacy Interactive Inc. The game was released in January 1999, for Macintosh and Microsoft Windows. In the game, the player controls a medical student who works in the emergency ward at Legacy Memorial Hospital. The game includes 100 patients whose cases are divided into five levels of difficulty. The patients can be brought through four areas of the hospital for diagnosis: an exam room, an X-ray room, a laboratory, and a treatment center. The game includes over 40 different medical tools. The player engages in various tasks to diagnose each patient, such as taking X-rays and CT scans, and performing stool tests. During patient exams, the player is given a time limit. By successfully treating patients, the player earns points that increase their ranking in hospital position. There are five rankings: medical student, intern, resident, attending physician, and chief of staff. The medical conditions encountered by the player become more severe with each ranking. The game includes voiceover work from Joey Lauren Adams and Steve Park, who respectively portray a nurse and a radiology technician. Legacy offered additional patient cases that could be downloaded from the game's website.

Anne Royal of Computer Games Magazine rated the game three stars out of five and criticized initial installation issues, but stated that the game "more than adequately represents the stressful life of triage staff in a busy hospital emergency room." Andrew Park of GameSpot gave the game a Fair rating of 6.8 out of 10, writing that while it "might be an interesting and challenging cognitive aid, it's not much of a game." Park was critical of the game's graphics and grainy full motion videos (FMV), its sensitive controls, and the lack of background music. Park stated that most of the voiceover work was done fairly well, but that some patients suffered from "an overdose of overacting." Park praised the large amount of medical information and stated that the game "seems like a decent piece of edutainment software."

Danny Lam of GamePro gave the game a Fun Factor of 4 out of 5 and stated that the game "kept me hooked," while writing that the "badly acted FMV sequences don't have the smoothest transitions and the injuries look fake." Lam concluded that for people who have an interest in medical science, the game "gives doctor-wannabes a scratch-the-surface education in the life of a medical professional." Michael L. House of AllGame gave the game two and a half stars out of five, and considered the game and many of its patient cases to be boring. House also criticized the game environment for its repetitive appearance, and he disliked the "annoying" comments made by patients.

=== Emergency Room: Disaster Strikes (1999) ===
Emergency Room: Disaster Strikes was developed and published by Legacy Interactive. The game was released for Macintosh and Windows on December 10, 1999. The game features similar gameplay to its predecessors. In the game, three disasters have struck California: an earthquake, a winter storm, and a freeway pileup. The player must deal with the aftermath of the disasters. The player chooses which of the three disaster sites to report to, and then selects a patient to bring back to the hospital for an examination, tests, and treatment. The player begins as a Medical Student at Legacy Memorial Hospital, and must work up through the ranks of Intern, Resident, Attending, and ultimately Chief of Staff. The player's ranking increases after receiving high grades for successfully treating patients. After selecting a patient, the player must develop a treatment plan. In the treatment room, the player is presented with tables and trays that offer various items which may be used for treating patients. The game features more than 50 medical tools. After each patient case, the player is given a report detailing what was done right and wrong. The game includes 100 patient cases, and additional cases could be downloaded from the game's website. The game also includes 250 video segments, featured at the disaster sites and in hospital exam rooms.

Karen McCall of AllGame gave a score of three stars out of five, calling the game "realistic and exciting." McCall praised the graphics and sound, but noted that the medical tools were sometimes difficult to use. Bart Farkas, a former registered nurse and a reviewer for Inside Mac Games, scored the Macintosh version 1 out of 10. Farkas criticized the lack of realism in the game but stated that "for a layperson it might be a semi-interesting experience". Anne Royal gave the game three stars out of five and stated that it was "considerably better" than its predecessors. D. Ian Hopper of CNN also considered the game an improvement over its predecessors and wrote that it "makes a good attempt at being fun as well as educational," but noted that some of the patient injuries had nothing to do with the three disasters depicted in the game.

=== Emergency Room: Life or Death (2000) ===
Emergency Room: Life or Death was developed and published by Legacy Interactive. The game was released for Macintosh and Windows on March 20, 2000. As with its predecessors, the game is set in Legacy Memorial Hospital, and features rankings that range from medical student to chief of staff. The game features 50 patient cases and more than 40 medical tools for treatment, as well as searchable databases that provide medical information and hints. The player must identify each patient's symptoms to devise the correct treatment. The player is assisted by a nurse and a doctor who both provide advice. The game features 150 hours of video footage in more than 250 video sequences depicting the hospital staff's comments to the player, including advice, criticism, and praise.

Mark Kanarick of AllGame gave the game a score of two and a half stars out of five. Kanarick criticized the game's graphics and the vague advice offered by the game's nurse and doctor. Kanarick also considered the game too difficult for most players but believed that it would appeal to people interested in a medical career, as well as people in the medical industry.

=== Emergency Room 3 (2001) ===
Emergency Room 3 was developed and published by Legacy Interactive. The game was released for Macintosh and Windows on May 21, 2001. The game features 50 patients who need to be diagnosed and treated by the player, who receives advice from a nurse.

Alan Regan wrote much of the game. Medical doctors were enlisted by Legacy to create more than 500 pieces of information associated with the patient cases, and many of the cases were inspired by real scenarios the doctors had encountered.

=== Emergency Room: Code Red (2001) ===
Emergency Room: Code Red was developed and published by Legacy Interactive. The game was released for Macintosh and Windows in October 2001. Set at Legacy Memorial Hospital, the game features 35 patients, each with their own medical conditions, and the player must prioritize which patient to see. With each case, the player stabilizes the patient, asks questions about their condition and symptoms, performs an examination, makes a tentative diagnosis, and then devises a treatment plan. The game features over 50 medical tools that the player must use throughout the game. The player is also aided by a personal digital assistant, while a doctor evaluates the player's progress after each patient is treated.

R. Gerbino of GameZone rated the game 7 out of 10 and noted poor animations for patient movements. Gerbino also noted occasional graphic glitches, poor sound quality, and repetitive comments from patients. However, Gerbino praised the "simple" controls and stated that despite the game's "minor deficiencies," it "manages to be an amusing change of pace." Harriet Gurganus, an ER nurse and a reviewer for Just Adventure, praised the game for its realism: "The scenarios are realistic. The action is believable. The medical equipment and patient complaints are exactly what you would see in every ER in the US. And the interface between you, the patient and the patient care computer is easy to use and accurate."

=== Emergency Room: Real Life Rescues (2009) ===
Emergency Room: Real Life Rescues was developed and published by Legacy Interactive, and was released for the Nintendo DS on August 25, 2009. The player controls a paramedic working for Harbor City Hospital, and the game includes more than 20 tools that the player must use to treat various patients.

=== Emergency Room: Heroic Measures (2010) ===
Emergency Room: Heroic Measures was developed and published by Legacy Interactive. The game was released for Macintosh and Windows on April 23, 2010. In the game, the player must ask patients questions to make an accurate diagnosis and devise the proper treatment.
