= Betrayal (Fitzpatrick book) =

Great agent

- Author: Robert Fitzpatrick with Jon Land
- Language: English
- Publisher: Forge Book
- Publication place: United States
- Media type: Print (hardcover & paperback), audio CD (read by Michael Prichard), Amazon Kindle, Audible, Audiobook
- ISBN: 978-0-7653-3551-7 (hardcover), ISBN 978-0-7653-3550-0 (trade paperback), ISBN 978-1-4299-6366-4 (e-book)
- Dewey Decimal: 813'.54—dc23
- LC Class: PS3562.A469B48 2012

Betrayal: Whitey Bulger and the FBI Agent Who Fought to Bring Him Down is the memoir of Robert Fitzpatrick, a former assistant special agent in charge of the FBI's Boston office. It was written by Fitzpatrick and his co-author Jon Land. In the early 1980s, FBI headquarters in Washington sent Fitzpatrick to the Boston FBI office to evaluate Whitey Bulger's "suitability" as a high level informant. Instead he encountered an environment that appeared to support and enable Bulger's alleged antithetical behaviors and goals. Former FBI Assistant Special Agent in Charge Sentenced for Perjury and Obstruction of Justice During Bulger Trial https://www.justice.gov/usao-ma/pr/former-fbi-assistant-special-agent-charge-sentenced-perjury-and-obstruction-justice
