= Zoo Vet =

2004 video game

- Developer: Legacy Games
- Publisher: Legacy Games
- Designer: Legacy Games
- Platform: Microsoft Windows
- Release: December 1, 2004
- Genre: Simulation
- Mode: Single player

Zoo Vet and Zoo Vet: Endangered Animals are computer games designed by Legacy Games.

== Gameplay ==
In the games, the player controls a veterinarian and has to cure animals using medical tools. There are minigames alongside the main game.

== Reception ==
Zoo Vet: Endangered Animals received a rating of 6.5/10 from IGN. Reviewer Lucas M. Thomas praised the large amount of animals within the game and the "solid" treatment process. He criticized the graphics, additionally stating that the stylus's controls were "often inconsistent", writing that it interfered with the gameplay.
