= Murder, She Wrote =

American crime drama television series (1984–1996)

- Genre: Crime drama Detective fiction
- Created by: Peter S. Fischer; Richard Levinson; William Link
- Starring: Angela Lansbury
- Theme music composer: John Addison
- Country of origin: United States
- Original language: English
- No. of seasons: 12
- No. of episodes: 264 (list of episodes)

Production
- Executive producers: Angela Lansbury (1992–1996); Peter S. Fischer (1984–1991); Richard Levinson; William Link; David Moessinger (1991–1992)
- Running time: 48 minutes
- Production companies: Universal Television; Corymore Productions (seasons 9–12)

Original release
- Network: CBS
- Release: September 30, 1984 – May 19, 1996

Related
- Magnum, P.I.; The Law & Harry McGraw

Murder, She Wrote is an American crime drama television series, created by Peter S. Fischer, Richard Levinson, and William Link, starring Angela Lansbury, and produced and distributed by Universal Television for the CBS network. The series focuses on the life of Jessica Fletcher, a mystery writer and amateur detective, who becomes involved in solving murders that take place in the fictional town of Cabot Cove, Maine, as well as across the United States and abroad. The program ran for 12 seasons from September 30, 1984, to May 19, 1996, for a total of 264 episodes and included among its recurring cast Tom Bosley, William Windom, and Ron Masak.

The series was a ratings hit during its broadcast, becoming a staple of the CBS Sunday-night TV schedule for around a decade, while achieving distinction as one of the most successful and longest-running television shows in history, averaging 25 million viewers per week in its prime. In syndication, the series is still highly successful and popular throughout the world.

For her role on the program, Lansbury was nominated for ten Golden Globes, winning four, along with nominations for 12 Emmy Awards, earning her the record for the most Golden Globe nominations and wins for Best Actress in a television drama series and the most Emmy nominations for Outstanding Lead Actress in a Drama Series. The series itself also received three Emmy nominations for Outstanding Drama Series, and six Golden Globe nominations in the same category, with two major wins.

After the series finale in 1996, four television films were released from 1997 to 2003. Two point-and-click video games were released for PC: one in 2009, and a sequel in 2012. The show was spun-off into a bestselling book series in 1989; it continues to be published as of 2026.

== History ==
=== Origin ===
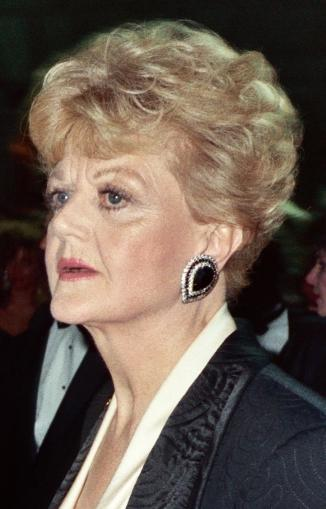
Lansbury in September 1989

Series producers Peter S. Fischer, Richard Levinson and William Link developed the lead role for actress Jean Stapleton, who was initially somewhat interested but eventually turned it down, threatening the project.

Scrambling to find another major star, the producers thought Angela Lansbury would be perfect for the part of Jessica Fletcher but did not think that she would be interested in a television series. Earlier, she had acted in two film adaptations of Agatha Christie's mystery novels: as Salome Otterbourne in Death on the Nile (1978) and as Miss Marple in The Mirror Crack'd (1980). When the latter film did poorly—despite an all-star cast including Rock Hudson, Elizabeth Taylor, Kim Novak and Tony Curtis—the offer for Lansbury to reprise Miss Marple in three more films never materialized.

When she made it known she would be available if the right project came along, the three creators sent her the script, and, almost immediately, Lansbury felt she could do something with the role of Jessica Fletcher. With Murder, She Wrote debuting on Sunday, September 30, 1984, the producers were able to parlay their "mystery writer/amateur detective" premise into a 12-year hit for CBS. It also made Lansbury, known previously for her motion picture and Broadway stage work, a household name for millions of television viewers. The title comes from Murder, She Said, which was the title of a 1961 film adaptation of Agatha Christie's Miss Marple novel 4:50 from Paddington.

=== Premise ===
The cast of Murder, She Wrote (L–R): Ron Masak, Angela Lansbury, William Windom

The show revolves around the day-to-day life of Jessica Fletcher (née MacGill, which was Lansbury's mother's maiden name), a widowed and retired English teacher, who becomes a successful mystery writer. Despite fame and fortune, Jessica remains a resident of Cabot Cove, a small coastal community in Maine (the first-season episode "Murder Takes the Bus" establishes that Cabot Cove is just north of the town of Newcastle), and maintains her links with all of her old friends, never letting her success go to her head.

The show usually starts with a preview of the episode's events, with Jessica stating: "Tonight on Murder, She Wrote..." Jessica invariably proves more perceptive than the official investigators of a case, who are almost always willing to arrest the most likely suspect. By carefully piecing the clues together and asking astute questions, she leads the authorities to arrest the real murderer. Murder occurred with such regularity in her vicinity that the term "Cabot Cove syndrome" was coined to describe the constant appearance of dead bodies in remote locations. Indeed, if Cabot Cove existed in real life, it would top the FBI's national crime statistics in numerous categories, with some analysis suggesting that the homicide rate in Cabot Cove exceeds even that of the real-life murder capital of the world. However, Fletcher travels constantly all over the nation and the world. In 12 years, just 54 episodes out of the total 264 take place in Cabot Cove.

Jessica's relationship with law enforcement officials varies from place to place. Both sheriffs of Cabot Cove resign themselves to having her meddle in their cases. However, most detectives and police officers do not want her anywhere near their crime scenes, until her accurate deductions convince them to listen to her. Some are happy to have her assistance from the start, often because they are fans of her books. With time, she makes friends in many police departments across the U.S., as well as with a British police officer attached to Scotland Yard. At the start of season eight, more of the stories were set in New York City with Jessica moving into an apartment there part-time in order to teach criminology at the city university.

== Production ==
Murder, She Wrote was mostly filmed on sound stages at Universal Studios in Universal City, California (near Los Angeles). The series also filmed exterior shots and some episodes on location in the Northern California town of Mendocino, which stood in for the fictional Maine town of Cabot Cove. Cabot Cove dockside scenes were filmed a few miles north at Noyo Harbor in Fort Bragg, California.

Bruce Lansbury, Angela's brother, served as producer of 88 episodes of the show. He was also a writer for 15 episodes.

=== Lansbury considers retirement in 1988 ===
In August 1988, Lansbury expressed weariness of her commitment to the series as she was not sure, at 63, that she could continue at the pace now required of her; she specifically cited the change from seven to eight days to shoot each episode. Thus, Murder, She Wrote went into its fifth season that autumn with the distinct possibility that it would cease production at the end of it and the series finale would air in May 1989.

A solution was worked on, however, which enabled Lansbury to continue but also give her time to rest. This also enabled some secondary characters to get significant stories. For the next two seasons, Lansbury reduced her appearances in several episodes, only appearing at the beginning and the end, to introduce stories starring several friends of Jessica, such as private investigator Harry McGraw, reformed thief Dennis Stanton or MI5 agent Michael Hagarty. The "experiment" ended in 1991. In 1992, Lansbury took on a more extensive role in production as she became the show's executive producer.

=== Move from Sundays in 1995 ===
Murder, She Wrote was renewed for a twelfth season after finishing the 1994–95 season as the eighth-most-watched program on television, tied with NBC's new sitcom Friends for the spot. Despite the continued popularity of the program, Lansbury was considering retirement again after the upcoming season as she would be nearing seventy years of age at its conclusion. The decision, ultimately, would not be left up to her as CBS would make a decision regarding the series that would prove problematic for the network on two separate nights of programming.

Murder, She Wrote was, at the time, the most popular scripted series on CBS; in fact, CBS' struggles as a network were so pronounced at that point that the show was one of only four programs in its entire lineup to garner a rating in the top twenty (Murphy Brown, which finished twelfth in that year's ratings; 60 Minutes, which finished sixth; and The CBS Sunday Movie, which finished eighteenth, were the other three). Meanwhile, over at NBC, their Thursday night Must See TV lineup had been a ratings powerhouse for years and CBS decided to use Murder, She Wrote in an effort to cut into their viewership. So, after eleven years on Sunday night, the series moved to Thursday for the 1995–1996 season. It would keep the same time slot (8:00 p.m.) on its new night, leading off a lineup that included the new drama New York News and the long-running news magazine 48 Hours; its first half would be facing off against Friends on NBC, which was entering its second season and was being moved to lead off the network's two-hour situation comedy block.

CBS decided to replace Murder, She Wrote with two sitcoms in its timeslot. The first was Cybill, which had been a midseason replacement series in 1995 that had been airing on Monday nights. The show, starring Cybill Shepherd as a struggling actress, had drawn a decent rating in its limited run, finishing as the #22 rated show. Following Cybill would be a new series, Almost Perfect, which saw Nancy Travis portray a television producer.

The moves made by CBS proved to be disastrous on both Thursday and Sunday. Murder, She Wrote saw a precipitous drop in its ratings, due to the growing popularity of Friends and the strong performances of both of its follow-up shows, The Single Guy and Boston Common; all three of these series would finish in the top ten in the ratings, while Murder, She Wrote would drop to 58th when the season was over. New York News, meanwhile, did not retain viewers from having the veteran drama as a lead-in and was cancelled after ten episodes. The Sunday sitcom lineup fared no better, as Cybill saw its ratings drop as well while Almost Perfect's ratings were bad enough that CBS decided to move it to its Monday comedy lineup to try and salvage the series, which succeeded (although it would be cancelled not long into its second season). The Bonnie Hunt Show, which had been airing on Fridays, was then retooled and moved to Sundays to try and boost its own sagging ratings, but would be cancelled at the end of the season.

Murder, She Wrote would also be cancelled when the season concluded, but not before CBS made a move that effectively reversed its earlier decision. Midway through the season, on January 7, 1996, CBS decided to air a new episode of Murder, She Wrote in its former Sunday timeslot. The episode drew the highest ratings of the season to that point, pulling in nearly twenty million viewers (the highest it had done in its new Thursday slot had been just over fifteen million, and it had averaged slightly under thirteen million for the first twelve episodes). Then, on February 25, another new episode was scheduled on Sunday night, and it also reached nearly twenty million viewers.

The network decided shortly thereafter to give Murder, She Wrote its old timeslot back to end its run. The last episode to air on Thursday aired on April 4, 1996, after which Murder, She Wrote went on hiatus for three weeks. It returned to the schedule on Sunday, April 28, in its old timeslot, for the first of the last four episodes of the series. Three of the four episodes drew over sixteen million viewers, with the penultimate episode being the exception, and the finale finished in the top 20 for the week.

=== After the series ===
The network also agreed to commission four Murder, She Wrote movies over the next few years. The first was South by Southwest (1997), with three more following as A Story to Die For (2000), The Last Free Man (2001) and The Celtic Riddle (2003).

Lansbury stated in May 2011 that she would like to make a comeback appearance as Jessica Fletcher. However, in a 2015 interview, she quashed the idea of reprising the much beloved character, stating, "I think it would be a downer. In some way, we'd have to show her as a much older woman, and I think it's better to maintain that picture we have in our mind's eye of her as a vigorous person. I'm still pretty vigorous, especially in the garden … but if I wanted to transform myself back into the woman I looked like then, it would be ridiculous. And I can't do that." Dame Angela Lansbury died on October 11, 2022, at age 96.

In 2023, over-the-top video streaming service The Roku Channel launched a 24-hour Murder, She Wrote channel.

== Cast ==
Actor	Character	Seasons												Movies
Actor	Character	1	2	3	4	5	6	7	8	9	10	11	12	Movies
Angela Lansbury	Jessica Fletcher	Main	Main	Main	Main	Main	Main	Main	Main	Main	Main	Main	Main	Main
Tom Bosley	Sheriff Amos Tupper	Recurring	Recurring	Recurring	Recurring									
William Windom	Sam Breen	Guest												
William Windom	Dr. Seth Hazlitt		Recurring	Recurring	Recurring	Recurring	Recurring	Recurring	Recurring	Recurring	Recurring	Recurring	Recurring	
Ron Masak	Sheriff Mort Metzger					Recurring	Recurring	Recurring	Recurring	Recurring	Recurring	Recurring	Recurring	
Will Nye	Dep. Floyd Jones					Recurring	Recurring	Recurring						
Louis Herthum	Dep. Andy Broom								Recurring	Recurring	Recurring	Recurring	Recurring	

- Angela Lansbury as Jessica Fletcher (1984–1996; 264 episodes), a retired English teacher who, after being widowed in her early 50s, becomes a very successful mystery writer. The only cast member to appear in every episode as the series is centered around her.

=== Recurring cast ===
- William Windom as Dr. Seth Hazlitt (1985–1996; 52 episodes), the local doctor of Cabot Cove and one of Jessica's best friends and most intrepid supporters. Windom previously appeared as another character, a lawyer named Sam Breen, in the season 1 finale, "Funeral at Fifty-Mile". Windom also played a separate character in Magnum P.I., which takes place in the same universe.
- Ron Masak as Sheriff Mort Metzger (1988–1996; 39 episodes), a former NYPD officer who takes Sheriff Tupper's place as sheriff in the mistaken belief that he would be living in a more peaceful place. His unseen wife, Adele, a former Marine capable of prodigious acts of strength, teaches self-defense classes. Masak previously appeared as other characters in earlier episodes: a police officer in the first-season episode "Footnote to Murder", and a store owner in trouble with the IRS in the third-season episode "No Accounting for Murder".
- Louis Herthum as Deputy Andy Broom (1991–1996, 25 episodes), Sheriff Metzger's second deputy.
- Tom Bosley as Sheriff Amos Tupper (1984–1988; 19 episodes), Cabot Cove's sheriff at the start of the series. Tupper later retires and goes to live with his sister.
- Will Nye as Deputy Floyd Jones (1988–1991, 15 episodes), Sheriff Metzger's original deputy.
- Michael Horton as Grady Fletcher (12 episodes, 1984–1990, 1995), Jessica's unlucky favorite nephew, who (through no fault of his own) always seems to get in trouble with the law. After some romantic disasters, he eventually marries his girlfriend Donna.
- Julie Adams as Eve Simpson (10 episodes, 1987–1993), the Cabot Cove realtor with a great love for men, both single and married, and for gossiping.
- Keith Michell as Dennis Stanton (9 episodes, 1988–1991, 1993), a suave English former jewel thief turned insurance claims investigator, who always solves his cases using unusual methods, and often sends a copy of the story to Jessica afterwards. Many of the episodes starring Dennis do not involve Jessica, and usually begin with her introducing the story to the audience, breaking the fourth wall. Keith Michell is the only actor other than Angela Lansbury to receive star billing (before the episode titles), on episodes which focus on Dennis.
- Jerry Orbach as Harry McGraw (7 episodes, 1985–1987, 1989, 1991), an old-school private investigator who becomes friends with Jessica. Orbach was popular enough to garner his own, short-lived spin-off series in 1987, The Law & Harry McGraw, and returned to Murder, She Wrote after his show was canceled. Harry ceased to be a character permanently after Orbach took on the role of Lennie Briscoe on Law & Order in 1992.
- Len Cariou as Michael Hagarty (7 episodes, 1985–86, 1988–1992), a British former MI5 agent, who often appeared when Jessica least expected him to drag her into a dangerous case. Cariou had previously starred with Lansbury on Broadway in Sweeney Todd: The Demon Barber of Fleet Street as the titular character.
- Richard Paul as Sam Booth (7 episodes, 1986–89, 1991–1992), the genial, ineffectual mayor of Cabot Cove who is elected on his campaign promise to do nothing.
- Herb Edelman as Artie Gelber (7 episodes, 1992–1995), a NYPD Lieutenant and Jessica's friend. Edelman had previously appeared as various characters in the series pilot, the second-season episode "Murder by Appointment Only", and the third-season episode "Murder in a Minor Key".

=== Occasional cast ===
- Hallie Todd as Rhoda Markowitz (6 episodes, 1990–1991), Dennis Stanton's assistant. Todd had previously appeared as another character in the season 6 episode "Class Act".
- Ken Swofford as Lt. Perry Catalano (6 episodes, 1990–1991). Swofford also appeared in four previous episodes and one later episode as various characters.
- James Sloyan as Robert Butler (5 episodes, 1990–1991). Sloyan had previously appeared as different characters in the third-season episode "Corned Beef and Carnage" and the fourth-season episode "The Body Politic".
- Wayne Rogers as Charlie Garrett (5 episodes, 1993–1995), a disreputable private investigator who usually gets into trouble and needs Jessica's help. Charlie's character was the replacement for Harry McGraw after Jerry Orbach's departure.
- Leonard Lightfoot as Detective Henderson (5 episodes, 1993–1994).
- Debbie Zipp as Donna Mayberry Fletcher (5 episodes, 1988–1990), Grady's girlfriend and later wife. Zipp had previously played another character in the third-season episode "The Days Dwindle Down". Zipp and Horton are married in real life, and have been since prior to the show.
- Claude Akins as Ethan Cragg (4 episodes, 1984), Jessica's fisherman friend. Ethan is replaced by Seth as Jessica's friend from Season 2 onwards.
- Madlyn Rhue as Jean O'Neil (4 episodes, 1993–1996), Cabot Cove's disabled librarian. Rhue had previously appeared as another character in the sixth-season episode "Seal of the Confessional".
- John Astin as Harry Pierce (3 episodes, 1984–1985), a local real estate agent. In his final appearance, Pierce briefly becomes Sheriff when Amos Tupper retires but turns out to be unsuitable for the job when he commits murder. Astin had previously appeared in the first-season episode "Hooray for Homicide", and later appeared in the eleventh-season episode "Film Flam", portraying different characters.
- Genie Francis as Victoria Brandon Griffin (3 episodes, 1984, 1986, 1990), Jessica's niece. Other than Grady Fletcher, she is the only one of Jessica's many nieces and nephews to appear more than once. Victoria's husband, hapless actor Howard Griffin (Jeff Conaway), also featured in two of the episodes.
- Ruth Roman as Loretta Speigel (3 episodes, 1987–1989), Cabot Cove's lovelorn hairdresser and an inveterate gossip.
- Kathryn Grayson as Ideal Molloy (3 episodes, 1987–1989), one of the regulars at Loretta's beauty parlour.
- Gloria DeHaven as Phyllis Grant (3 episodes, 1987–1989), one of the regulars at Loretta's beauty parlour.
- Bruce Gray as Ted Hartley (3 episodes, 1991–1994). Gray had previously appeared as different characters in two other episodes.
- Gregory Sierra as Lt. Gabriel Caceras (3 episodes, 1993–1995). Sierra had previously appeared as various characters in three other episodes.
- Paddi Edwards as Lois Hoey (2 episodes, 1984), a resident of Cabot Cove and member of its PTA, and a friend of Jessica's. Appears in the pilot and another episode of season 1.
- Dale Robertson as Colonel (ret.) Lee Goddard (2 episodes, 1988–1989), a member of Frank Fletcher's US Air Force unit who reunites with Jessica when Frank is accused of a historic murder. A widower, Goddard also has romantic designs on Jessica. Robertson was uncredited for both appearances.
- Many actors and actresses also appeared in many episodes playing various characters, sometimes a different character in each one. These include Rosanna Huffman, who portrayed a member of the PTA in the pilot episode and various others across all the seasons, appearing in 7 episodes overall; Tricia O'Neil who appeared in the Pilot and 5 episodes overall; and Barbara Babcock, who portrayed different characters in 5 episodes. There are several other examples including veteran character actor Steve Forrest famous for S.W.A.T. and a memorable appearance on Dallas.

== Episodes ==
Season	Episodes	Originally released		Rank	Rating
Season	Episodes	First released	Last released	Rank	Rating
1	22	September 30, 1984	April 21, 1985	8	20.1
2	22	September 29, 1985	May 18, 1986	3	25.3
3	22	September 28, 1986	May 10, 1987	4	25.4
4	22	September 20, 1987	May 8, 1988	9	20.2
5	22	October 23, 1988	May 21, 1989	8	19.9
6	22	September 24, 1989	May 20, 1990	13	17.7 (Note: Tied with Chicken Soup.)
7	22	September 16, 1990	May 12, 1991	12	16.4
8	22	September 15, 1991	May 17, 1992	8	16.9
9	22	September 20, 1992	May 16, 1993	5	17.7
10	21	September 12, 1993	May 22, 1994	11	16.0
11	21	September 25, 1994	May 14, 1995	8	15.6 (Note: Tied with Friends.)
12	24	September 21, 1995	May 19, 1996	58	9.50
Movies	4	November 2, 1997	May 9, 2003	—N/a	—N/a

=== Crossover with Magnum, P.I. ===
The third-season episode of Murder, She Wrote entitled "Magnum on Ice" concludes a crossover that began on the seventh-season Magnum, P.I. episode "Novel Connection". In the episode's plot, Jessica comes to Hawaii to investigate an attempt to murder Robin Masters' guests, and then tries to clear Magnum when he's accused of killing the hitman. The Magnum, P.I. episode originally aired on November 19, 1986, with the concluding Murder, She Wrote episode following four days later on November 23.

The Magnum, P.I. episode of the crossover is included on the Murder, She Wrote Season 3 DVD set, as well as the Complete Series Set. The Magnum, P.I. Season 7 DVD set, as well as its Complete Series set, includes the Murder, She Wrote episode.

== Awards and honors ==
Over its 12-year run Murder, She Wrote received numerous award nominations. Lansbury herself holds the record for the most Emmy nominations for outstanding lead actress in a drama series with twelve, one for each season. She never won, which is also a record. Mary Dodson, the art director for 102 of the series' 264 episodes, received three Emmy nominations for her work on Murder, She Wrote. In total, the show was nominated for 41 Emmys.

Group	Award	Years	Result
Primetime Emmy Awards	Outstanding Drama Series	1985–87	Nominated
Primetime Emmy Awards	Outstanding Lead Actress in a Drama Series (Angela Lansbury)	1985–96	Nominated
Primetime Emmy Awards	Outstanding Music Composition for a Series (John Addison)	1985	Won
Primetime Emmy Awards	Outstanding Music Composition for a Series (Bruce Babcock)	1993, 1995	Nominated
Primetime Emmy Awards	Outstanding Costume Design for a Series (Alfred E. Lehman)	1986	Won
Golden Globe Awards	Best TV Series—Drama	1984, 1985	Won
Golden Globe Awards	Best TV Series—Drama	1986–89	Nominated
Golden Globe Awards	Best Performance by an Actress in a TV Series—Drama (Angela Lansbury)	1984, 1986, 1989 & 1991	Won
Golden Globe Awards	Best Performance by an Actress in a TV Series—Drama (Angela Lansbury)	1985, 1987, 1988, 1990, 1992 & 1994	Nominated
Edgar Awards	Best Episode of a TV Series ("Deadly Lady")	1985	Won
Edgar Awards	Best Episode of a TV Series ("The Dead File")	1993	Nominated
Screen Actors Guild Awards	Best Performance by an Actress in a TV Series—Drama (Angela Lansbury)	1994	Nominated

== U.S. television ratings ==
Murder, She Wrote maintained extremely high ratings, finishing in the top 15 of shows for eleven of its 12 seasons (eight of which it was in the top 10), even well into its late seasons. By its 11th season, Murder, She Wrote was still averaging 25 million viewers per week. At its very peak, the show even hit above 40 million U.S. viewers. However, at the beginning of its 12th season in 1995, CBS moved the show from its extremely popular Sunday nighttime slot to Thursday night forcing it to compete with NBC's Must See TV line-up, and as a result the ratings plummeted; during seasons 11 and 12, CBS changed affiliates in several major markets as part of a broader network affiliation realignment, resulting in confusion among some viewers of where to find the network. The show rated as the following:

Television ratings
Season		Episodes	Time slot (ET)	Season premiere	Season finale	Rank	Rating
1	1984–85	22	Sunday at 8:00 p.m. (Episodes 1, 3–22); Sunday at 9:00 p.m. (Episode 2)	September 30, 1984	April 21, 1985	#8	20.1
2	1985–86	22	Sunday at 8:00 p.m.	September 29, 1985	May 18, 1986	#3	25.3
3	1986–87	22	Sunday at 8:00 p.m.	September 28, 1986	May 10, 1987	#4	25.4
4	1987–88	22	Sunday at 8:00 p.m.	September 20, 1987	May 8, 1988	#9	20.2
5	1988–89	22	Sunday at 8:00 p.m.	October 23, 1988	May 21, 1989	#8	19.9
6	1989–90	22	Sunday at 8:00 p.m.	September 24, 1989	May 20, 1990	#13	17.7
7	1990–91	22	Sunday at 8:00 p.m.	September 16, 1990	May 12, 1991	#12	16.4
8	1991–92	22	Sunday at 8:00 p.m.	September 15, 1991	May 17, 1992	#8	16.9
9	1992–93	22	Sunday at 8:00 p.m.	September 20, 1992	May 16, 1993	#5	17.7
10	1993–94	21	Sunday at 8:00 p.m.	September 12, 1993	May 22, 1994	#11	16.0
11	1994–95	21	Sunday at 8:00 p.m.	September 25, 1994	May 14, 1995	#8	15.6
12	1995–96	24	Thursday at 8:00 p.m. (Episodes 1–12, 14–17, 19–20); Sunday at 8:00 p.m. (Episodes 13, 18, 21–24)	September 21, 1995	May 19, 1996	#58	9.50

== Canceled reboot ==
Deadline Hollywood reported in October 2013 that NBC was planning a reboot of the series, starring Octavia Spencer as a "hospital administrator and amateur sleuth who self-publishes her first mystery novel." The next month, Lansbury said that while she was a fan of Spencer, she was not a fan of using the title; she said "I think it's a mistake to call it Murder, She Wrote because Murder, She Wrote will always be about Cabot Cove and this wonderful little group of people who told those lovely stories and enjoyed a piece of that place, and also enjoyed Jessica Fletcher, who is a rare and very individual kind of person." It was decided by producers that Spencer's character would not be named Jessica Fletcher, for only Lansbury could play Fletcher. On January 21, 2014, Deadline Hollywood announced that the reboot would not be going forward.

== Film adaptation ==
On September 9, 2023, it was revealed that a film adaptation of the series was in the early stages of development at Universal Pictures. Dumb Money screenwriters Lauren Schuker Blum and Rebecca Angelo will write the script while Amy Pascal acts as producer. On December 16, 2024, it was announced that Phil Lord and Christopher Miller were joining as producers.

Jamie Lee Curtis told Entertainment Tonight in July 2025 that the movie was close to shooting. "It's… happening," said the Academy Award–winning actress, who will take on the role of Jessica Fletcher. In January 2026, it was announced that Jason Moore would direct the feature. In March 2026, it was reported that the film had set a December 22, 2027 release date. The following month however, the film was pushed back to February 4, 2028.

== Merchandise ==
In 1985, Warren Company released a Murder, She Wrote board game. In the game, one player takes the hidden role of a killer and the other players try to determine which player is the killer through deduction. The killer wins for killing five of the characters on the game-board and escaping, while the detective players win by correctly deducing the identity of the killer.

In December 2009, casual game developer and publisher Legacy Interactive, under license with Universal Pictures Digital Platforms Group (UPDPG), announced the release a PC and Macintosh video game, Murder, She Wrote, based on the television series. In the game, players help Jessica Fletcher to solve five unusual murders. A sequel, Murder She Wrote 2, was launched by Legacy Interactive in November 2012.

Since 2020, Funko and NECA have released an array of dolls and action figures based on Murder, She Wrote, specifically the character Jessica Fletcher.

== Multimedia ==
- List of Murder, She Wrote novels
- List of Murder, She Wrote home video releases
- List of former Universal Studios Florida attractions

== See also ==
- Murder She Said
