= Crime and Punishment (disambiguation) =

Crime and Punishment is a novel by Fyodor Dostoyevsky.

Crime and Punishment may also refer to:

== Film ==
- Raskolnikow (film), a 1923 German film directed by Robert Wiene
- Crime and Punishment (1917 film), an American silent crime drama film
- Crime and Punishment (1935 American film), a film directed by Josef von Sternberg
- Crime and Punishment (1935 French film), a French crime drama
- Crime and Punishment (1945 film), a Swedish film
- Crime and Punishment (1951 film), a Mexican film
- Crime and Punishment (1956 film), a French crime film
- Crime and Punishment U.S.A., a 1959 American film directed by Denis Sanders
- Crime and Punishment (1970 film), a Soviet film in two parts directed by Lev Kulidzhanov
- Crime and Punishment (1983 film), a Finnish film directed by Aki Kaurismäki
- Crime and Punishment (1998 film), a television film directed by Joseph Sargent
- Crime and Punishment in Suburbia, a 2000 film directed by Rob Schmidt
- Crime and Punishment (2002 Russian film), a film directed by Menahem Golan
- Crime + Punishment, an American documentary that received a Special Jury Award at the 2018 Sundance Film Festival

== Television ==
- Crime and Punishment, a 1979 BBC production starring John Hurt and Timothy West
- Crime & Punishment (1993 TV series), an NBC police drama series created by Dick Wolf
- Crime and Punishment (2002 TV series), a British television film directed by Julian Jarrold starring John Simm
- Crime and Punishment (2024 TV series), a Russian TV series adaptation of the novel
- Crime & Punishment, a 2002 television spin-off of the Law & Order franchise
- Tony Robinson's Crime and Punishment, a 2008 British documentary series

=== Episodes ===
- "Crime and Punishment" (Brooklyn Nine-Nine)
- "Crime and Punishment" (Dawson's Creek)
- "Crime and Punishment" (Private Practice)
- "Crime and Punishment" (Roseanne)
- "Crime and Punishment" (Supergirl)

== Other ==
- Crime and Punishment (play), a 2007 play by Marilyn Campbell and Curt Columbus
- Crime and Punishment (video game), a 1984 legal simulation game released for the Commodore 64 and MS-DOS
- Sherlock Holmes: Crimes & Punishments, a 2014 video game
- On Crimes and Punishments, a 1764 treatise on legal reform by Cesare Beccaria
- Crime and Punishment (manga), a 1953 manga series based on Dostoyevsky's novel by Osamu Tezuka
- Crime and Punishment: A Falsified Romance, a 2007 manga adaptation of Dostoyevsky's novel by Naoyuki Ochiai
- National Museum of Crime & Punishment, in Washington, D.C.
- "Tsumi to Batsu"(Crime and Punishment), a 2000 single by Japanese singer Ringo Sheena, released on her second album Shōso Strip
- "Crime and Punishment", a 2010 song by Japanese Vocaloid producer Deco*27, as well as its 2025 re-recording
