= Legacy Games =

American video game publisher

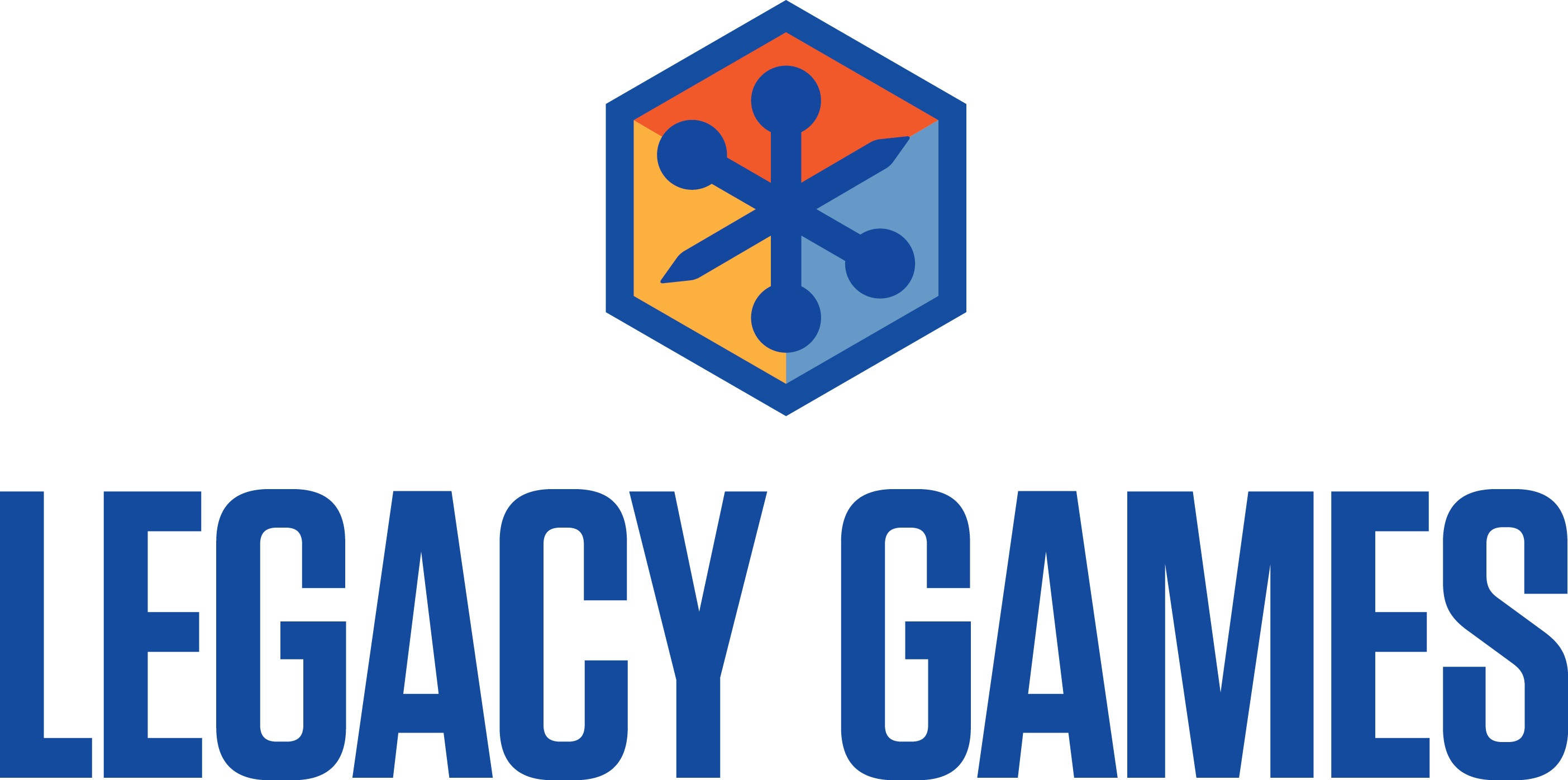
- Industry: Video games
- Founded: September 1998
- Founder: Ariella Lehrer
- Defunct: December 31, 2026
- Fate: Dissolved
- Headquarters: Los Angeles, California
- Website: www.legacygames.com

Legacy Games (also known as Legacy Interactive) is a game publisher and distributor specializing in casual games and indie titles for PC, console, and mobile platforms. It offers digital downloads of games through its website, www.legacygames.com. Additionally, Legacy sells physical discs with digital codes at Walmart stores and on Amazon. The company is well-known for its game packs, offering over 100 different bundles of themed hidden object, indie, puzzle, adventure, match 3, and simulation games.

Ariella Lehrer is CEO of Legacy Games, which she founded in 1998. Based in Los Angeles, Legacy Games has created and published many hidden object and adventure game titles based on TV brands such as Ancient Aliens, Doctor Who, Paranormal State, Sherlock Holmes, Criminal Minds, Murder, She Wrote, Ghost Whisperer, Law & Order, ER, Twilight Zone, Psych, Jane Austen, Clueless, Mean Girls, and Pretty in Pink. Legacy's many educational game credits include pioneering "real-life games" such as the Zoo Vet, Pet Pals: Animal Doctor, and Emergency Room products, plus three Crayola creativity titles.

Legacy distributes the games of over 75 developers and publishers, including Artifex Mundi, Microids, Domini Games, Gamehouse, Big Fish Games, Alawar, and Kalypso, among others.

In October 2026, the company announced its closure by the end of the year.

== Legacy's Published Titles ==
Game title	Original Release Year	Platform
Adam Wolfe	2024	Switch, Xbox, PS4/5
Pearls of Atlantis: The Cove	2022	iOS, Android, PC, HTML5, Switch, PS5
Ancient Aliens: The Game	2022	PC
Project Blue Book: Hidden Mysteries	2021	PC
Crayola Color Blaster	2016	Android (Tango-enabled devices)
Tarzan Rescue Run	2016	Gee Inflight Entertainment, iOS, Android
3D PRINT KITS - Build Your Own Guitar	2015	Retail, Amazon
3D PRINT KITS - Build Your Own Desk Clock	2015	Retail, Amazon
Crayola Bubbles	2015	Android, iPad, PC, Intel RealSense
K3Y	2015	Android, iPad
Crayola DJ	2015	Android, iPad, HP Sprout, Win8
Chubby Pixie	2015	iOS, Android
Crayola Color, Draw & Sing	2014	PC, iOS, Android
Doctor Who	2014	PC, Steam
The Twilight Zone	2014	PC
Psych	2014	PC
Tarzan Unleashed	2013	iOS, Android
Paranormal State	2013	PC, Mac, iOS, Android
Jane Austen's Estate of Affairs	2013	PC, Mac
League of Mermaids	2013	PC, Mac, iPhone, iPad, Android
Disaster Hero	2013	Web Browser
Atlantis: Pearls of the Deep	2013	PC, Mac, iPhone, iPad, Android
Jane Austen Unbound	2012	Facebook
Legends of Atlantis: Exodus	2012	PC, Mac, Android, iPhone, iPad
Criminal Minds	2012	PC, Mac
Murder, She Wrote 2	2012	PC, Mac, iPad
Ghost Whisperer	2012	PC, Mac
House M.D.	2010	PC, DSi
Top Doc	2010	iPhone
The Lost Cases of 221B Baker St.	2010	PC, iPhone
The Lost Cases of Sherlock Holmes 2	2010	PC, Mac
Emergency Room: Heroic Measures	2010	PC
Bird Brain	2009	iPhone
Emergency Room: Real Life Rescues	2009	DS
Pretty in Pink	2009	PC
Clueless	2009	PC
Mean Girls	2009	PC
Murder, She Wrote	2009	PC, Mac, iPhone
Igor: The Game	2008	PC, Wii, Nintendo DS
CSI: NY – The Game	2008	PC
The Lost Cases of Sherlock Holmes	2008	PC
Fever Frenzy	2008	PC, Mac, iPad, iPhone
Pet Pals: New Leash on Life	2008	PC, DS
Farm Vet	2008	PC
Brain Spa	2007	PC
The Tuttles Madcap Misadventures	2007	PC
Zoo Vet: Endangered Animals	2007	PC, Wii, Nintendo DS
The Apprentice: Los Angeles	2007	PC
Pet Pals: Animal Doctor	2006	PC
The Apprentice	2006	PC
ER	2005	PC
Law & Order: Criminal Intent	2005	PC
Law & Order: Justice Is Served	2004	PC
Zoo Emergency	2004	PC
Zoo Vet	2004	PC
Law & Order: Double or Nothing	2003	PC
911 Paramedic	2002	PC
Law & Order: Dead on the Money	2002	PC
Vet Emergency 2	2002	PC
Vet Emergency	2002	PC
Emergency Room: Code Red	2001	PC
Emergency Room 3	2001	PC
Code Blue	2000	PC
Emergency Room: Life or Death	2000	PC
Emergency Room: Disaster Strikes	1999	PC
Emergency Room 2	1999	PC, Macintosh (PowerPC)
Emergency Room	1995	PC (published as Legacy Software)

== Awards ==
Crayola DJ

- Parents' Choice Award Winner - 2015 Mobile App Award - Fun Stuff
- (NAPPA) National Parenting Publications Awards: 2015 Bronze Winner
- Creative Child Magazine: 2015 Mobile App Creative Play of the Year Award
- The Parenting Center: The National Parent Center's Seal of Approval
- Kids First! Certified Endorsement

Atlantis: Pearls of the Deep

- Gamezebo's 2012 Match-3 Game of the Year

Zoo Vet

- Parents' Choice Approved Award Winner
- National Parenting Center's Seal of Approval

Pet Pals: Animal Doctor

- Parents' Choice Silver Award Winner

Pet Pals: New Leash on Life

- Parents' Choice 2009 Gold Award Winner

The Tuttles Madcap Misadventures

- Game Tunnel 2007 Kid's Game of the Year – Innovation

Zoo Vet Endangered Animals

- 2008 Parents' Choice Gold Award Winner
