= Law and Order Party =

Law and Order Party as a proper name may refer to:

- Law and Order Party of Rhode Island, a short-lived political party in the U.S. state of Rhode Island in the 1840s
- Law and Order Party (Kansas), a pro-slavery party in Kansas during the Bleeding Kansas period
- For Each and Every One (Latvian: Katram un katrai, KuK), the previous name of Platform 21
- A faction opposed to the 1856 San Francisco Committee of Vigilance
