= Jon Land =

American author and screenwriter

- Born: United States
- Occupations: Director, producer, writer, author
- Writing career
- Language: English
- Genres: Thrillers, screenwriting

Jon Land is an American author of thriller novels.

His books include the Caitlin Strong novels about a fifth-generation Texas ranger, and the Ben Kamal and Danielle Barnea books, about a Palestinian detective and chief inspector of the Israeli police.

He is an emeritus board member and currently sits on the marketing committee for the International Thriller Writers.

He was a screenwriter for the film Dirty Deeds.

== Books ==
=== Caitlin Strong ===
1. Strong Enough to Die, Forge Books, 2009
2. Strong Justice, Forge Books, 2010
3. Strong at the Break, Forge Books, 2011
4. Strong Vengeance, Forge Books, 2012
5. Strong Rain Falling, Forge Books, 2013
6. Strong Darkness, Forge Books, 2014
7. Strong Light of Day, Forge Books, 2015
8. Strong Cold Dead, Forge Books, 2016
9. Strong to the Bone, Forge Books, 2017
10. Strong as Steel, Forge Books, 2019
11. Strong from the Heart, Forge Books, 2020

=== Ben Kamal and Danielle Barnea ===
1. The Walls of Jericho, Forge Books, 1997
2. The Pillars of Solomon, Forge Books, 1999
3. A Walk in the Darkness, Forge Books, 2000
4. Keepers of the Gate, Forge Books, 2001
5. Blood Diamonds, Forge Books, 2002
6. The Blue Widows, Forge Books, 2003
7. The Last Prophecy, Forge Books, 2004

=== Blaine McCracken ===
1. The Omega Command, Fawcett, 1986
2. The Alpha Deception, Fawcett, 1987
3. The Gamma Option, Fawcett, 1989
4. The Omicron Legion, Fawcett, 1991
5. The Vengeance of the Tau, Fawcett, 1993
6. Day of the Delphi, Tor Books, 1993
7. Kingdom of the Seven, Forge Books, 1994
8. The Fires of Midnight, Forge Books, 1996
9. Dead Simple, Forge Books, 1998
10. Pandora's Temple, Open Road Media, 2012
11. The Tenth Circle, Open Road Media, 2013

=== Jared Kimberlain ===
1. The Eighth Trumpet, Fawcett, 1989
2. The Ninth Dominion, Fawcett, 1991

=== Michael Tiranno ===
1. The Seven Sins: The Tyrant Ascending, Forge Books, 2008
2. Black Scorpion the Tyrant Reborn, Forge Books, 2015

=== Murder, She Wrote ===
- Murder She Wrote - A Date with Murder, co-written with Donald Bain, Berkley, 2018
- Murder, She Wrote - Manuscript for Murder, Berkley, November 2018
- Murder, She Wrote - Murder in Red, Berkley, 2019
- Murder, She Wrote: A Time for Murder, Berkley, November 2019 ISBN 978-1984804303
- Murder, She Wrote: The Murder of Twelve, Berkley, May 2020 ISBN 978-1984804334
- Murder, She Wrote: Murder in Season, Berkley, November 2020

=== The Rising ===
Written with Heather Graham

1. The Rising, 2017
2. Blood Moon, Tor Books, 2022

=== Other Fiction ===
- The Doomsday Spiral, Zebra, 1983
- Vortex, Zebra, 1984
- The Lucifer Directive, Zebra, 1984
- Labyrinth, Fawcett, 1985
- The Council of Ten, Fawcett, 1987
- The Valhalla Testament, Fawcett, 1990
- Hope Mountain, Forge Books, 1998
- Dolphin Key, Forge Books, 1999
- Dark Light: Dawn, Forge Books, 2017
- Margaret Truman's Murder on the Metro, Forge Books, 2021

=== Nonfiction ===
- Betrayal: Whitey Bulger and the FBI Agent Who Fought to Bring Him Down, co-written with Robert Fitzpatrick, Forge Books, 2012
- Takedown: A Small-Town Cop's Battle Against the Hells Angels and the Nation's Biggest Drug Gang, with Jeff Buck and Lindsay Preston, Forge Books, 2016
