= Law & Justice (journal) =

- Discipline: Law
- Language: English

Publication details
- History: 1974–present
- Publisher: The Edmund Plowden Trust (U.K.)
- Frequency: Biannual

Standard abbreviations
- ISO 4: Law Justice

Indexing
- ISSN: 0269-817X

Links
- Journal homepage

Law & Justice (also known as The Christian Law Review) is a biannual peer-reviewed academic legal periodical published by The Edmund Plowden Trust. The primary focus of the journal is a Christian perspective of the law, with a particular emphasis on religious freedom, canon law, ethics and morality.

The current editor is John Duddington, former head of the Law School at Worcester College of Technology.

== See also ==
- Edmund Plowden

== Associated websites ==
- Law & Justice
- Worcester Law School
