= Law & Order: Justice Is Served =

2004 video game

- Developer: Legacy Interactive
- Publishers: NA: Legacy Interactive; EU: Mindscape Inc.
- Platform: Microsoft Windows
- Release: NA: October 5, 2004; EU: November 26, 2004
- Genre: Adventure
- Modes: Single-player, multiplayer

Law & Order: Justice Is Served is the third in a series of video games based on the television series Law & Order. The game was developed by Legacy Interactive and was first published in October 2004.

== Plot ==
During a junior tennis tournament, a young player is found murdered in the stadium's locker room. The game player works with NYPD detectives Lennie Briscoe and Ed Green as they investigate the crime and make the arrest. Once accomplished, the player who now plays as an Executive ADA, works with ADA Serena Southerlyn to try to crack the case, but there are twists and turns that reveal dark secrets about the sport and its players. For the first time in the game series, and in the format of the show, a second junior detective's role for the player is introduced, rather than the player being Briscoe's partner. This was due to the developers' wish to include Jesse L. Martin in one of their games. DA Charles Northcutt, played by Alan Oppenheimer, is a character created exclusively for the game who does not appear in the main show.

== Reception ==
Reception

Aggregate scores
Aggregator	Score
GameRankings	76.19%
Metacritic	77/100

Review scores
Publication	Score
Adventure Gamers	3.5/5
GameSpot	7.2/10
GameSpy	4/5
GameZone	7.7/10
IGN	8.4/10
PC Format	53%
PC Gamer (US)	79%
The Sydney Morning Herald	3.5/5

Justice Is Served was met with positive reception upon release, as GameRankings gave it a score of 76.19%, while Metacritic gave it 77 out of 100.

Justice Is Served received a runner-up position in GameSpot's 2004 "Best Adventure Game" award category across all platforms, losing to Myst IV: Revelation.
