= Law & Order: Double or Nothing =

2003 video game

- Developer: Legacy Interactive
- Publishers: NA: Legacy Interactive; EU: The Adventure Company
- Platform: Microsoft Windows
- Release: NA: October 1, 2003; EU: November 21, 2003
- Genre: Adventure
- Modes: Single-player, multiplayer

Law & Order: Double or Nothing (also known as Law & Order II: Double or Nothing) is the second in a series of video games based on the television series Law & Order. The game was developed by Legacy Interactive and was first published in September 2003, a year after the release of Law & Order: Dead on the Money.

== Plot ==
The game's plot revolves around the murder of a noted geneticist in his car on a city street. The player and Detective Briscoe investigate the crime and gather the evidence to make the arrest. Once accomplished, the player joins forces with ADA Serena Southerlyn and tries to crack a case that combines traditional desires with almost futuristic means. DA Douglas Wade, played by Victor Brandt, is a character created exclusively for the game who does not appear in the main show.

== Controversy ==
A controversy erupted in the United Kingdom over the game after an in-game image (used to depict a fictional child abduction) was discovered to be an actual CCTV still of murdered toddler James Bulger being kidnapped by his killers. Because of this, the game's distributors withdrew it from the shelves for a short period of time. A spokesman for the game's developer, Legacy Interactive, said they were only made aware of the offending picture on June 17, 2007. The spokesman said: "Obviously the game was out almost five years ago and this is the first time we knew anything about it otherwise we would never have put it out." An update patch was later released, which removes the image of Bulger from the game for anyone with an offending copy.

== Critical reception ==
Reception

Aggregate scores
Aggregator	Score
GameRankings	69.45%
Metacritic	74/100

Review scores
Publication	Score
Adventure Gamers	4/5
GameSpot	7.1/10
GameZone	7.5/10
PC Gamer (UK)	35%
X-Play	3/5

Double or Nothing was met with average to mixed reception, as GameRankings gave it a score of 69.45%, while Metacritic gave it 74 out of 100. According to PC Data, the game's North American retail sales reached 37,714 units by the end of 2003.
