= Law & Order: Dead on the Money =

2002 video game

- Developer: Legacy Interactive (Note: Ported to Mac OS X by TransGaming.)
- Publishers: NA: Legacy Interactive; EU: The Adventure Company; Aspyr (Mac OS X)
- Platforms: Windows, Mac OS X
- Release: Windows: NA: September 24, 2002; UK: June 2003; Mac OS X: NA: December 4, 2003
- Genre: Adventure
- Mode: Single-player

Law & Order: Dead on the Money is the first in a series of video games based on the television series Law & Order. The game was developed by Legacy Interactive and was first released in September 2002.

== Plot ==
The game's plot revolves around the murder of a Wall Street stock broker who is murdered in Central Park whilst jogging. The player and Detective Briscoe then question a number of people related to the incident, including a park cleaner, coffee vendor, the broker's employer, her lawyer, daughter, and her associates. The player must assess who is the murderer and then take them to trial. The game, like the original format of the show, is separated into two parts. During the first half, the player assumes the part of Junior Detective, working as the partner of Detective Lennie Briscoe (Jerry Orbach), who is tasked with gathering enough evidence to make an arrest. During the second half, the player assumes the part of executive assistant district attorney, who is partnered with ADA Serena Southerlyn (Elisabeth Röhm), with the object of convincing a jury that the defendant is guilty. DA Douglas Wade, played by Victor Brandt, is a character created exclusively for the game who does not appear in the main show.

== Reception ==
=== Sales ===
Law & Order: Dead on the Money was a commercial success that surpassed its developer's expectations. By August 2003, it had sold 180,000 units; in the United States alone, more than 120,000 copies were sold by September. PC Data tracked 55,956 domestic sales of the game during 2003 alone. Legacy Interactive's Christina Oliver Taylor said at the time, "Frankly, we weren't sure how popular the game would be, given reports of decreasing sales trends for both adventure games and PC games, but we were counting on the enthusiasm of the Law & Order fans, and they really came through." In early 2004, Lorraine Lue of DreamCatcher Interactive's European branch likewise reported that Dead on the Money had performed "very, very well" worldwide, and singled out the United Kingdom as a successful market for the game.

=== Critical reviews ===
Reception

Aggregate score
Aggregator	Score
Metacritic	70/100

Review scores
Publication	Score
Adventure Gamers	3.5/5
Computer Gaming World	2/5
GameSpot	6.5/10
GameZone	7.9/10
IGN	8/10
PC Gamer (UK)	37%
PC Gamer (US)	40%
X-Play	2/5
Entertainment Weekly	B−

The game received "mixed or average reviews" from critics, according to the review aggregation website Metacritic.
