= Law & Order season 13 =

Season of American television series

Law & Order
- Season 13
- Season 13 U.S. DVD cover
- Starring: Jerry Orbach; Jesse L. Martin; S. Epatha Merkerson; Sam Waterston; Elisabeth Röhm; Fred Dalton Thompson
- No. of episodes: 24

Release
- Original network: NBC
- Original release: October 2, 2002 – May 21, 2003

Season chronology
- ← Previous; Season 12 Next → Season 14

The thirteenth season of the American legal drama series Law & Order premiered on NBC on October 2, 2002, and ended on May 21, 2003.

== Cast ==
Arthur Branch (played by Fred Dalton Thompson) replaced season 12's Nora Lewin (Dianne Wiest) in the role of District Attorney. The resulting ensemble cast was the most stable in the history of the Law & Order series up to that time, being unchanged for 2 seasons over 48 episodes (Seasons 7 and 8 were the first seasons with no cast changes as well, however those seasons totaled 47 episodes). The longest period of cast stability overall encompassed the last four episodes of Season 18 and the entirety of Seasons 19 and 20, a total of 49 episodes.

=== Main ===
- Jerry Orbach as Senior Detective Lennie Briscoe
- Jesse L. Martin as Junior Detective Ed Green
- S. Epatha Merkerson as Lieutenant Anita Van Buren
- Sam Waterston as Executive Assistant District Attorney Jack McCoy
- Elisabeth Röhm as Assistant District Attorney Serena Southerlyn
- Fred Dalton Thompson as District Attorney Arthur Branch

=== Recurring ===
- Carolyn McCormick as Dr. Elizabeth Olivet
- J. K. Simmons as Dr. Emil Skoda
- Leslie Hendrix as M.E. Dr. Elizabeth Rodgers
- John Cariani as CSU Technician Julian Beck
- Andrea Navedo as Det. Ana Cordova

=== Guest ===
- Tovah Feldshuh as Defense Attorney Danielle Melnick
- David Zayas as John Mireles

== Episodes ==
No. overall	No. in season	Title	Directed by	Written by	Original release date	Prod. code	U.S. viewers (millions)
278	1	"American Jihad"	Constantine Makris	Aaron Zelman & Marc Guggenheim	October 2, 2002	E3304	19.13
A Muslim-American man, Greg Landon, becomes the prime suspect in a double homicide after an academic challenges his religious beliefs. Cast: First appearance of Fred Dalton Thompson as DA Arthur Branch.
279	2	"Shangri-La"	Constantine Makris	Michael S. Chernuchin	October 9, 2002	E3301	20.25
The murder of high school English teacher Valerie Keenan uncovers a love triangle that includes a female student and a male teacher, both of whom become suspects. The prosecutors have to deal with a dark secret the student has been hiding once the secret is revealed.
280	3	"True Crime"	Martha Mitchell	Wendy Battles & Noah Baylin	October 16, 2002	E3305	19.29
Investigating the death of Patty Voytek, a rock singer who had large amounts of cocaine and heroin in her system, the detectives question a former boyfriend who was a disgruntled bandmate of her late husband. The actions of a retired detective-turned-writer, who worked a case with Briscoe several years back and whose unconventional research tactics make him an additional suspect, hamper the prosecution.
281	4	"Tragedy on Rye"	David Platt	William N. Fordes	October 23, 2002	E3303	20.16
Struggling actress Lucy Dolan is murdered in an apparent robbery-homicide where a videotape, made by a couple touring the city and sold to a local news station, shows three suspects loading the stolen property into an SUV. They are charged with the capital crime of felony murder, which causes unrest with Southerlyn regarding the death penalty. Note: Inspired by the May 2001 New York City shooting above the popular tourist attraction, the Carnegie Deli.
282	5	"The Ring"	Richard Dobbs	Michael S. Chernuchin	October 30, 2002	E3309	18.44
The discovery of a body in Hell's Kitchen that had worn a $40,000 diamond ring leads Briscoe and Green back to the September 11 attacks. The victim, Kelly Sommers, had reportedly died on the 89th floor of the World Trade Center, and the investigation leads to a fiancé, an extramarital lover, and the determination that the events of 9/11 may have been convenient timing to hide the fact that she was murdered the night before.
283	6	"Hitman"	Richard Dobbs	Eric Overmyer	November 6, 2002	E3302	19.02
The execution-style shooting of city contractor Tony Rosatti leads Briscoe and Green to suspect a professional hitman. They first focus upon possible enemies of the victim, but end up suspecting the victim's wife and her boyfriend of hiring the killer. However, evidence leads McCoy and Southerlyn to a conspirator that no one had suspected.
284	7	"Open Season"	Matthew Penn	Richard Sweren	November 13, 2002	E3306	17.98
Vance Grody, a prominent defense attorney who had just acquitted a man charged with attempted murder of a police officer, is gunned down outside a Manhattan restaurant. The detectives start with cops in the injured officer's precinct and then his brother before they are led to a white supremacist who is part of a national network. McCoy is faced with the unlikely prospect that the defendant's attorney, his friend of 20 years and a friend of Grody's, played a part in the murder of a Florida district attorney following the defendant's arrest. McCoy is able to make a deal that preserves the integrity of his adversary but not without a cost.
285	8	"Asterisk"	Steve Shill	Terri Kopp	November 20, 2002	E3308	15.84
A star baseball player becomes the prime suspect in the murder of Norman Pratt his limousine driver when it is discovered that the driver was his supplier of steroids. The investigation reveals blackmail as the underlying motive for the murder.
286	9	"The Wheel"	Richard Dobbs	Jill Goldsmith	November 27, 2002	E3307	19.62
The smoldering corpse of Helen Quan an Asian girl found outside the Chinese consul general's apartment, leading the detectives to believe she had immolated herself to make a political statement. When forensics shows that she had been murdered beforehand, they find themselves in the middle of a religious conflict with the consul general as their prime suspect.
287	10	"Mother's Day"	Jace Alexander	Janis Diamond	December 11, 2002	E3311	19.55
The hit-and-run death of Emily Milius a popular high school student leaves the detectives suspecting the girl's father was the real target. When evidence reveals that the death was possibly a random killing, they are able to track down their suspect to his apartment. However, things get complicated when their killer is murdered.
288	11	"Chosen"	Ed Sherin	Michael S. Chernuchin	January 15, 2003	E3310	19.03
The murder of Gordon Meeks a bookie with a high-class clientele leads the detectives to arrest his partner. Charged with first-degree murder, his attorney puts forth an unusual defense strategy that turns the trial into a political statement.
289	12	"Under God"	Gloria Muzio	Marc Guggenheim & Noah Baylin	February 5, 2003	E3313	18.33
Well-known drug dealer Scott Giddins is killed, and suspicion falls on a dead teenager's father. This case hits Briscoe hard because his daughter Cathy, who had struggled with meth addiction for years, was recently murdered by her dealer boyfriend after she testified against him for immunity (as seen in "Damaged"). Briscoe, still mourning his loss, is unusually sympathetic towards the suspect. Guest starring: Denis O'Hare as Father Richard Hogan.
290	13	"Absentia"	Martha Mitchell & Darnell Martin	Eric Overmyer	February 12, 2003	E3314	18.38
When Levi March, the witness in a jewelry store robbery-homicide, fails to appear in court, McCoy suspects foul play until he discovers more about the man. Guest starring: Mandy Patinkin as Levi March.
291	14	"Star Crossed"	David Platt	Richard Sweren	February 19, 2003	E3315	19.81
The bludgeoning of Hal Garber a luxury sports car dealer leads the detectives to a mentally challenged man and his girlfriend, who is extremely attractive and whose expensive tastes lead her to be equally manipulative.
292	15	"Bitch"	Constantine Makris	Michael S. Chernuchin & Roz Weinman	February 26, 2003	E3320	19.63
The death of Brad Osterhaus a stockbroker leads the detectives to his famous photographer girlfriend and her mother, who is a cosmetics mogul with a longstanding friendship with DA Arthur Branch. The mother will stop at nothing to protect her corporate image and goes as far as using hormone-replacement therapy withdrawal as the basis for her defense.
293	16	"Suicide Box"	Matthew Penn	Aaron Zelman	March 5, 2003	E3312	16.48
Media-savvy attorney Carl Helpert defends a black teenager accused of shooting an off-duty police officer. Guest starring: Gregory Hines as Carl Helpert.
294	17	"Genius"	Jace Alexander	William N. Fordes	March 19, 2003	E3318	15.47
While investigating the murder of John Chertoff a cab driver, the detectives come to suspect a famous author and his protege, a former child prodigy.
295	18	"Maritime"	Gloria Muzio	Wendy Battles	April 9, 2003	E3319	15.48
A missing football player becomes the prime suspect in the murder of Julie Eastman a woman whose body is discovered floating in the East River. When his yacht is found with all the guests missing, the detectives suspect that the player was a victim himself of his problematic brother.
296	19	"Seer"	James Quinn	Jill Goldsmith	April 23, 2003	E3316	18.09
The prime suspect in the murder of Rachel Cardwell a woman outside a sex club claims to have merely witnessed the crime via a psychic vision.
297	20	"Kid Pro Quo"	David Platt	Eric Overmyer & Roz Weinman	April 30, 2003	E3325	18.09
The murder of Deborah Landon, a private-school admissions director, leads the detectives to investigate a pair of angry parents whose children were denied admission, but then they set their sights on the headmaster when they discover that the victim was about to go public with the denied admissions.
298	21	"House Calls"	Jace Alexander	Janis Diamond	May 7, 2003	E3323	17.46
The suspicious death of Nadia Parkova a Russian model leads the detectives to suspect medical malpractice.
299	22	"Sheltered"	Richard Dobbs	Terri Kopp	May 14, 2003	E3324	18.33
In a race against time, the detectives go on the hunt for a sniper whose victims are shot in broad daylight. Guest starring: Sebastian Stan as Justin Capshaw.
300	23	"Couples"	David Platt	Lorenzo Carcaterra	May 21, 2003	E3317	16.01
In an episode that spends only five minutes with the District Attorney's team, Briscoe and Green catch four unconnected crimes on the same day, three murders and a kidnapping, stumbling upon the new ones while travelling from earlier ones; the pair get handed confessions – by end of day – in each case. As they leave the precinct at the end of the long day, they are called to the scene of a suspected jumper.
301	24	"Smoke"	Constantine Makris	S : Dick Wolf; T : Michael S. Chernuchin	May 21, 2003	E3322	19.02
After events in "Couples", Briscoe and Green arrive at the location of the suspected jumper, finding it was a baby who fell from a burning apartment. The pair investigate the eccentric comedian who may have killed his young son by dangling him off a ledge.
