= Law & Order season 11 =

Season of American television series

Law & Order
- Season 11
- Season 11 U.S. DVD cover
- Starring: Jerry Orbach; Jesse L. Martin; S. Epatha Merkerson; Sam Waterston; Angie Harmon; Dianne Wiest
- No. of episodes: 24

Release
- Original network: NBC
- Original release: October 18, 2000 – May 23, 2001

Season chronology
- ← Previous; Season 10 Next → Season 12

The eleventh season of Law & Order premiered on NBC October 18, 2000, and concluded with a two-hour finale on May 23, 2001. This was the first season of the series to start in October.

== Cast ==
Nora Lewin (played by Dianne Wiest) replaced Adam Schiff (Steven Hill) as District Attorney after the end of the previous season. He was the last remaining member of the show's original cast from 1990. Angie Harmon, who had played Abbie Carmichael since the beginning of season 9, left the series at the end of this season.

=== Main ===
- Jerry Orbach as Senior Detective Lennie Briscoe
- Jesse L. Martin as Junior Detective Ed Green
- S. Epatha Merkerson as Lieutenant Anita Van Buren
- Sam Waterston as Executive Assistant District Attorney Jack McCoy
- Angie Harmon as Assistant District Attorney Abbie Carmichael
- Dianne Wiest as Interim District Attorney Nora Lewin

=== Recurring ===
- J. K. Simmons as Dr. Emil Skoda
- Leslie Hendrix as M.E. Dr. Elizabeth Rodgers

=== Guest ===
- Rudolph Giuliani as Himself
- Carey Lowell as Defense Attorney Jamie Ross
- Tovah Feldshuh as Defense Attorney Danielle Melnick

== Episodes ==
No. overall	No. in season	Title	Directed by	Written by	Original release date	Prod. code	U.S. viewers (millions)
230	1	"Endurance"	Constantine Makris	Matt Witten	October 4, 2000	E1304	17.77
A suspicious apartment fire leaves a severely disabled boy dead of smoke inhalation. Though an antique store owner in the same building had been "victim" to several other fires in the past, Detectives Briscoe and Green are drawn to suspects closer to home as they discover the tremendous burden the young boy posed to his parents and their failed marriage during his twelve years. As more is learned about the devoted mother Megan Parnell, even E.A.D.A. Jack McCoy begins to question whether his prosecution is truly in the service of justice. Meanwhile, Mayor Giuliani introduces Interim District Attorney Nora Lewin to McCoy and Carmichael. Cast: First appearance of Dianne Wiest as IDA Nora Lewin. Guest starring: John Costelloe, Nick Chinlund, Sakina Jaffrey, and Megan Follows as Megan Parnell. Special guest appearance: Rudolph Giuliani as himself.
231	2	"Turnstile Justice"	Richard Dobbs	Barry Schindel	October 11, 2000	E1303	16.67
When a woman with no identification is found dead from a blow to the head with a pavement stone, the only clues to her past are found in the information stored on her mass-transit pass. More magnetic evidence leads Detectives Briscoe and Green to the current possessor of the dead woman's credit card; but once they have their suspect, the mental state of the attacker calls into question whether the perpetrator alone is responsible for the tragedy. Following a plea to action from the deceased's ex-husband Paul Donatelli, District Attorney Lewin pursues media glory by encouraging prosecutors McCoy and Carmichael to take on the health care system responsible for releasing the emotionally disturbed convict into society. Guest starring: Victor Slezak, Jack Gilpin, and Ty Burrell as Paul Donatelli.
232	3	"Dissonance"	Lewis H. Gould	Wendy Battles	October 18, 2000	E1307	17.60
When Nathalie Dreisner, the star violinist of the Manhattan Symphony Orchestra, is found murdered in her dressing room, Detectives Briscoe and Green don't have to look beyond the concert hall for an array of leads. The priceless violin she played is missing and the rest of the violin section is found to have been resentful of the recent Juilliard graduate's rapid ascent to stardom. Meanwhile, the brilliant and debonair conductor Carl Reger, whose wife also performs in the orchestra, points the detectives toward a stagehand who may have been rebuffed in his advances toward the victim, as his own relationship with his first chair violinist comes under scrutiny. Guest starring: Ronald Guttman as Carl Reger, Jan Maxwell, Ron McLarty, George Grizzard.
233	4	"Standoff"	Jace Alexander	P.K. Todd	October 25, 2000	E1308	19.03
When a gang leader convicted of brutal crimes is stabbed to death in a prison scuffle, Detectives Briscoe and Green find that their victim had numerous enemies on both sides of the law. The investigation, in which gang members, corrections officers, and undercover cops are all suspects, results in an eventual indictment that leaves E.A.D.A. McCoy with an uphill battle as he tries to convict the murderer of a vicious criminal. Guest starring: Matt Mulhern, Ned Eisenberg, Alison Bartlett, Thomas G. Waites, Dan Moran, Isiah Whitlock Jr., Otto Sanchez.
234	5	"Return"	Stephen Wertimer	Aaron Zelman	November 1, 2000	E1309	18.69
The murder of Saul Caplan, a storeowner, leads to a case where the suspect flees to Israel and may be protected from extradition by Israel's Law of Return. Guest starring: Evan Handler, Bruce Ornstein, Danny Maseng, Bruce Altman.
235	6	"Burn Baby Burn"	David Platt	Richard Sweren	November 8, 2000	E1306	18.29
A former Black Panther accused of murdering Jack Kearsey, a Caucasian police officer, questions Green's integrity amidst a politically charged trial. Guest starring: Clarence Williams III as Latiff Miller; Joe Morton as Defense Attorney Leon Chiles. Note: Based on the 1981 murder of Philadelphia police officer Daniel Faulkner by Mumia Abu-Jamal.
236	7	"Amends"	Matthew Penn	William N. Fordes	November 15, 2000	E1302	19.41
Under pressure from the department's top brass, a 20-year-old murder case, initially investigated by Briscoe's now-retired boss, is reopened; it involves the slaying of a teenage girl, with the spoiled son of a politically connected family as the prime suspect. Guest starring: Brad Sullivan as Tommy Brannigan; James Hanlon as Officer Charles Curran; Ron Leibman as Barry Nathanson. Note: Based on the 1975 murder of Martha Moxley.
237	8	"Thin Ice"	Jace Alexander	S : Bernard Goldberg; T : Barry Schindel & Matt Witten	November 22, 2000	E1310	18.22
The killing of Russ Crider, a school hockey coach, leads to a case in which the defendant claims that he committed the crime while suffering from "sports rage." Guest starring: Geoffrey Wigdor as Keith Taylor; Harley Venton as Raymond Taylor; Richard Venture as Defense Attorney Douglas Greer. Note: The original airing of this episode was delayed a week due to Vice President Al Gore's concession speech in the extended 2000 Presidential election.
238	9	"Hubris"	Constantine Makris	Kathy McCormick & Wendy Battles	November 29, 2000	E1311	20.34
An assistant manager at a jeweler's discovers four bodies at the store, leading to the prosecution of an amiable murder suspect who insists on representing himself, and winning the admiration of a female juror. Guest starring: Tim Guinee as Mark Landry.
239	10	"Whose Monkey Is It Anyway?"	Vincent Misiano	William M. Finkelstein	December 13, 2000	E1318	18.19
The death of Ronald Lee, a lab technician, and the abduction of 17 infected monkeys lead to a trial involving the treatment of research animals. Guest starring: Tresa Hughes, Catherine Hickland, Terrence Mann.
240	11	"Sunday in the Park with Jorge"	James Quinn	William M. Finkelstein	January 24, 2001	E1301	18.54
Following "wilding incidents" in Central Park, a woman's body is found in the lake and the suspects include the deceased's wealthy husband. Note: This episode was based on incidents of violence at the 2000 Puerto Rican Day Parade, and caused a controversy by offending some members of the Puerto Rican community. NBC promised not to re-run it. Despite NBC's embargo, the episode is still rerun in syndication.
241	12	"Teenage Wasteland"	Constantine Makris	Barry Schindel & Aaron Zelman	January 31, 2001	E1315	19.31
The beating death of Tommy Ngai, a chinese restaurant owner, leads Briscoe and Green to thrill-seeking teenagers; McCoy and Lewin are forced to decide how young is too young for the death penalty.
242	13	"Phobia"	David Platt	Kathy McCormick & Lynn Mamet & Wendy Battles	February 7, 2001	E1313	20.07
Briscoe and Green investigate the beating death of James Bradford, a gay man, and the kidnapping of his adopted son, and their investigation leads McCoy and Carmichael to believe that homophobia was the motive rather than ransom.
243	14	"A Losing Season"	Jace Alexander	Barry Schindel & Wendy Battles	February 14, 2001	E1322	18.25
Briscoe and Green initially investigate the fiancé of Dina Meredith, a pregnant woman found dying in the trunk of her car, but the investigation soon turns to professional athlete Chris Coty, who may have had reasons of his own to want the woman and her unborn child out of the way.
244	15	"Swept Away"	James Quinn	William M. Finkelstein	February 21, 2001	E1319	18.88
When a participant in a TV reality show is murdered, McCoy goes after the producers and network executives for deliberately fomenting hostility among the participants to boost the ratings. All too appropriately, the outcome of the case hinges on a videotape made by a hidden camera. Guest starring: Charlie Day as Jeremy.
245	16	"Bronx Cheer"	Richard Dobbs	S : Wendy Battles; S/T : Richard Sweren	February 28, 2001	E1316	18.70
When a woman, Angel Jarrell, is found strangled to death with a large quantity of the drug Ecstasy in her handbag, Detectives Briscoe and Green have difficulty gathering sufficient evidence for an indictment of their prime suspect, drug dealer Francis "Taz" Partell. But when they question one of his former associates, they discover new evidence indicating that Taz is responsible for the earlier murder of a bouncer in Bronx County. Guest starring: Peter Greene as Francis "Taz" Partell. Note: The episode carries a disclaimer stating that the Bronx County District Attorney portrayed by Keith David was in no way intended as a reference to real-life Bronx DA Robert Johnson.
246	17	"Ego"	James Quinn	William N. Fordes & Wendy Battles	March 14, 2001	E1324	18.14
When the dead body of Karen Hall, an investigator with the State Attorney General's Office Criminal Division, is found in the Hudson River, Detectives Briscoe and Green find that her boss, Alec Conroy, had written off her disappearance as a random kidnapping from an Albany train station. But as more is learned about Conroy's controlling relationships — with the dead woman, with his wife and with a longtime girlfriend — he quickly becomes a suspect. Guest starring: Gerry Bamman as Defense Attorney Stan Gillum, and Nestor Serrano as Alec Conroy.
247	18	"White Lie"	Don Scardino	Richard Sweren & Aaron Zelman	April 4, 2001	E1312	17.96
Briscoe and Green investigate Daniel and Rosa Alvarez, a couple murdered in their apartment, which leads them to the wife of an officer in the U.S. Army who is involved in anti-drug activities in Colombia, leaving McCoy with the awkward job of getting her to testify. Guest starring: Ruben Santiago-Hudson as Defense Attorney Winters. Notes: Based on smuggling cocaine by Laurie Anne Hiett, wife of Col. James Hiett who supervised the American campaign against illegal drug trade in Colombia. The episode carries a disclaimer stating that the portrayed persons, places, and events have been fictionalized and that any similarity to real life is unintentional.
248	19	"Whiplash"	Richard Dobbs	Matt Witten & Aaron Zelman	April 18, 2001	E1323	16.28
When Hector Santiago, a Hispanic male, is found dead from a severe chest trauma, Detectives Briscoe and Green discover that he and two other illegal immigrants had been in a staged automobile accident. As evidence mounts linking numerous similar car crashes with the same employer, chiropractor, insurance adjuster and lawyers, ADAs McCoy and Carmichael must determine who is ultimately responsible for the man's death, from which so many others profited.
249	20	"All My Children"	David Platt	Barry Schindel & Noah Baylin	April 25, 2001	E1326	19.67
The murder of Scott Wilder, a young man, points to a mysterious woman who may have been extorting money from the victim's wealthy father, who she believed was also her father.
250	21	"Brother's Keeper"	Constantine Makris	René Balcer & Joe Gannon	May 2, 2001	E1325	18.82
Briscoe and Green discover that a murdered businessman may have been the target of a well-known criminal, but the investigation stumbles when the FBI acts as the suspect's alibi. The case gets even more complicated when the detectives find out the suspect has a twin brother, that both brothers had a motive for killing the victim and they can't be sure who was actually the murderer.
251	22	"School Daze"	Richard Dobbs	S : Dick Wolf; T : Barry Schindel & Eric Overmyer	May 2, 2001	E1329	21.55
Detectives Briscoe and Green investigate when a masked schoolkid opens fire on classmates, killing four and wounding eleven. It soon becomes apparent that more than one child fits the profile of a youth capable of committing such violence. An e-mail sent by one of the students skews the investigation towards one particular youth with a violent history. But finding the perpetrator becomes a race against time when another e-mail arrives threatening more murders. E.A.D.A. McCoy goes head to head with Jamie Ross, who is acting as the teen's defense attorney, and who argues that the e-mail is inadmissible because it is privileged.
252	23	"Judge Dread"	David Platt	Richard Sweren & Aaron Zelman	May 16, 2001	E1327	16.96
An attempted murder of Linda Karlin, a tough judge, leads Briscoe and Green on a wild goose chase to track down the criminal. When the perpetrator is found, Carmichael and McCoy have a difficult time making a case. Guest starring: Tovah Feldshuh as Defense Attorney Danielle Melnick.
253	24	"Deep Vote"	Jace Alexander	William N. Fordes & Matt Witten	May 23, 2001	E1331	20.03
A woman's murder leads Briscoe and Green to discover the actual target was a reporter who did a story about voting improprieties in a recent senatorial election. Carmichael can't get the reporter to reveal her sources for a story containing allegations that the vote was fixed and ballots tampered with, even though the reporter's life is at risk. Without the source, McCoy and Carmichael have a difficult time making a case against the Senator, who they believe has ties to the mob and ordered the hit on the reporter. The case hinges on 2,000 missing ballots from the vote that were stolen by the mob. Once the ballots are found, there is a court battle over whether or not they should be counted. McCoy believes that the ballots will show the Senator's motive for ordering the hit, but an appellate court won't allow it, so their case is virtually dead. In the end, McCoy is able to convince the reporter to reveal her source and have him testify against the senator, which surprisingly turns out to be the Senator's own campaign manager. Meanwhile, Carmichael tells McCoy that she is leaving the D.A.'s Office to accept a job with the U.S. Attorney's Office as soon as the case is over. Cast: Last appearance of Angie Harmon as ADA Abbie Carmichael.
