= Law & Order season 14 =

Season of American television series

Law & Order
- Season 14
- Season 14 U.S. DVD cover
- Starring: Jerry Orbach; Jesse L. Martin; S. Epatha Merkerson; Sam Waterston; Elisabeth Röhm; Fred Dalton Thompson
- No. of episodes: 24

Release
- Original network: NBC
- Original release: September 24, 2003 – May 19, 2004

Season chronology
- ← Previous; Season 13 Next → Season 15

The fourteenth season of Law & Order premiered on September 24, 2003 and concluded on May 19, 2004 on NBC. The season consists of 24 episodes. This is the final season to feature Jerry Orbach as Det. Lennie Briscoe, as the character was transferred to the spin-off Law & Order: Trial by Jury, where he appeared in the first two episodes before his death from prostate cancer on December 28, 2004. In May 2004, it was announced that Dennis Farina would replace Orbach as Detective Joe Fontana in the following season.

== Cast ==
The cast of season 14 remained unchanged from season 13. Jerry Orbach, who had played Lennie Briscoe since 1992, left the series at the end of the 14th season, and would be replaced by Dennis Farina. Orbach would move to the third spin-off, Law & Order: Trial by Jury, and appear in the first two episodes, before his death on December 28, 2004.

=== Main ===
- Jerry Orbach as Senior Detective Lennie Briscoe
- Jesse L. Martin as Junior Detective Ed Green
- S. Epatha Merkerson as Lieutenant Anita Van Buren
- Sam Waterston as Executive Assistant District Attorney Jack McCoy
- Elisabeth Röhm as Assistant District Attorney Serena Southerlyn
- Fred Dalton Thompson as District Attorney Arthur Branch

=== Recurring ===
- Carolyn McCormick as Dr. Elizabeth Olivet
- J. K. Simmons as Dr. Emil Skoda
- Leslie Hendrix as M.E. Dr. Elizabeth Rodgers
- John Cariani as CSU Technician Julian Beck
- Andrea Navedo as Det. Ana Cordova

=== Guest ===
- Dylan Baker as Defense Attorney Sanford Rems
- Tovah Feldshuh as Defense Attorney Danielle Melnick

== Episodes ==
No. overall	No. in season	Title	Directed by	Written by	Original release date	Prod. code	U.S. viewers (millions)
302	1	"Bodies"	Constantine Makris	S : Michael S. Chernuchin; S/T : William N. Fordes	September 24, 2003	E4302	20.86
While investigating the death of a teenage girl, the detectives stumble on a pattern of crimes that indicate they are after a serial killer. The suspect, however, puts the prosecutors through an ethical wringer when he discloses his attorney's knowledge of the victims and their whereabouts.
303	2	"Bounty"	Matthew Penn	Michael S. Chernuchin	October 1, 2003	E4304	17.50
The investigation into the murder of bounty hunter Robert Rovelli leads to a reporter with compromised ethics and a dubious defense strategy.
304	3	"Patient Zero"	David Platt	Wendy Battles	October 8, 2003	E4301	16.47
The investigation into the carjacking of Anna Hopkins reveals her vehicle contained vials of a deadly virus, leading the detectives on a search for the first person infected with the virus and a biochemist whose sinister motivations were driven by passion.
305	4	"Shrunk"	Jace Alexander	Richard Sweren	October 15, 2003	E4305	16.60
The police and prosecutors investigate the connection between John David Myers, an award-winning songwriter, and Carrie Gunderson, the young woman found murdered in his home, to discover who would profit by her death at his hands.
306	5	"Blaze"	Gloria Muzio	Marc Guggenheim & Aaron Zelman & Michael S. Chernuchin	October 22, 2003	E4309	16.17
A teenager's need for parental love, acceptance, and recognition sets in motion the events leading to the deaths of 23 concert-goers in a blaze started by a rock band's illegal pyrotechnics. Note: Based on The Station nightclub fire.
307	6	"Identity"	Jace Alexander	Janis Diamond	October 29, 2003	E4311	16.38
When a man is found murdered shortly after depositing almost $400,000 in his savings account, the investigation into the source of funds reveals that Andy Hitchens, the victim, ran an identity theft scam which left Lonnie Jackson, an elderly man, homeless and impoverished.
308	7	"Floater"	Richard Dobbs	Eric Overmyer	November 5, 2003	E4307	18.93
The husband of a woman whose partially decomposed body is found floating in the Hudson River becomes the prime suspect in her murder until the prosecutors uncover a connection between her prospective attorney and a judge who has heard a suspiciously high number of his cases.
309	8	"Embedded"	Ed Sherin	Craig Turk	November 12, 2003	E4303	17.53
After Frank Elliot, a reporter accused of causing the deaths of soldiers with whom he was embedded in Iraq by reporting on their troop movements, is shot and wounded on the eve of his return to the front, the ballistics report indicates that the gun belonged to one of the dead soldiers, leading the detectives to uncover who brought the gun back from the front and committed the crime.
310	9	"Compassion"	Constantine Makris	Roz Weinman	November 19, 2003	E4308	14.74
When Gideon Blake, a con man passing himself off as a grief counselor, is poisoned by a respected doctor he victimized, McCoy must determine whether revenge or insanity prompted the crime.
311	10	"Ill-Conceived"	David Platt	Aaron Zelman & Noah Baylin & Michael S. Chernuchin	November 26, 2003	E4306	16.61
Arnold Zachary, the owner of a clothing company with illegal immigrant workers, is found murdered which sends the detectives on a search for an unidentified evening caller whose girlfriend, also a worker in the factory, recently gave birth. Upon discovery that the victim was also the baby's father, the boyfriend is arrested with the motive being an office affair until the victim's widow discloses that it was a surrogate arrangement.
312	11	"Darwinian"	Jace Alexander	Marc Guggenheim	December 17, 2003	E4313	17.99
The apparent hit-and-run of a homeless man sends the detectives on a search for the driver, a high-profile female publicist, which fuels the fire for the prosecutors to obtain a murder conviction. However, an autopsy reveals that the victim died as a result of a beating, which had to have taken place hours before the car accident, which leads to a suspect within the homeless community.
313	12	"Payback"	Constantine Makris	Lorenzo Carcaterra	January 14, 2004	E4310	17.23
The investigation into the murder of Jerry Tortino a former bookie turned mob informant reveals a disturbing new wrinkle in organized crime involving legitimate businessmen moonlighting as contract hitmen in a battle for mob leadership, and ends with a Federal ploy to nullify the plea bargain in the case, leaving McCoy seething and two more people dead.
314	13	"Married with Children"	Richard Dobbs	Wendy Battles & William N. Fordes	February 4, 2004	E4315	17.33
The death of Lisa Winslow, a woman who fell from a hotel balcony leads to a case involving a lesbian couple and a state law banning gay adoption.
315	14	"City Hall"	Gloria Muzio	Richard Sweren & Marc Guggenheim	February 11, 2004	E4318	16.96
A city employee's clerical error sets in motion a chain of events which culminates in a fatal shooting at City Hall and a secret federal court proceeding with sinister implications.
316	15	"Veteran's Day"	David Platt	Noah Baylin	February 18, 2004	E4314	18.04
A decorated Gulf War veteran, grief-stricken over the Afghanistan combat death of his son, murders an anti-war protester, claiming at trial that he acted under extreme emotional distress.
317	16	"Can I Get a Witness?"	Don Scardino	Aaron Zelman	February 25, 2004	E4320	16.73
McCoy faces an uphill battle in proving that witnesses to the murder of Henry Ware a drug mule were bribed, intimidated, and eventually murdered on the orders of the drug dealer accused of the crime.
318	17	"Hands Free"	Gloria Muzio	Janis Diamond	March 3, 2004	E4316	14.61
When McCoy fails to win a murder conviction against an eccentric cross-dressing millionaire for the death of his neighbor, he redoubles the effort to convict the man for murdering his second wife years earlier by demonstrating that he murdered a witness to the crime. Note: Based on the murderer Robert Durst.
319	18	"Evil Breeds"	Constantine Makris	S : Barry Schindel; S/T : Noah Baylin	March 24, 2004	E4326	15.05
A Holocaust survivor, Leah Glaser, is murdered on the eve of her testimony in the deportation trial of Stefan Anders, a former concentration camp guard. McCoy must not only put the murderer on trial, but also the former guard who stood to gain the most from the survivor's death, even though evidence is limited.
320	19	"Nowhere Man"	Martha Mitchell	William N. Fordes	March 31, 2004	E4324	17.86
The District Attorney's Office is set on its ear when the investigation into the death of ADA Daniel Tenofsky uncovers a scandal that could imperil hundreds of cases. Cameo: New York City Mayor Michael Bloomberg as himself.
321	20	"Everybody Loves Raimondo's"	Richard Dobbs	S : Richard Sweren; S/T : Lorenzo Carcaterra	April 14, 2004	E4327	16.16
Greed, treachery and disrespect shape the motives for murder when two men are gunned down at an exclusive restaurant.
322	21	"Vendetta"	David Platt	S : Michael S. Chernuchin; S/T : David Nahmod	April 21, 2004	E4317	17.21
The investigation into a barroom brawl fatality reveals a detective's decades-old vendetta against a petty criminal turned murderer who was falsely accused of one murder after evading conviction on another. Note: Partially inspired by the 2003 Steve Bartman incident.
323	22	"Gaijin"	Jace Alexander	Wendy Battles	May 5, 2004	E4325	17.19
Van Buren has reservations about Branch's tactics in luring a Ginza nightclub owner back to New York after the Japanese government is unwilling to extradite him to face charges of conspiracy and murder in the death of his wife on a New York City vacation.
324	23	"Caviar Emptor"	Richard Dobbs	Roz Weinman	May 12, 2004	E4321	15.86
When Manny Suleimani a caviar importer is murdered the day after his wedding to a much-younger woman, the large pool of suspects includes his new wife, his children, and his chief competitor, each of whom has a compelling motive for committing the crime.
325	24	"C.O.D."	Matthew Penn	Richard Sweren & Marc Guggenheim	May 19, 2004	E4319	19.46
Briscoe bids farewell to the 27 as the prosecution of two women for killing each other's husbands comes to a successful conclusion. Cast: Final appearance in this series by Jerry Orbach as Lennie Briscoe.
