= Law & Order season 8 =

Season of American television series

Law & Order
- Season 8
- Season 8 U.S. DVD cover
- Starring: Jerry Orbach; Benjamin Bratt; S. Epatha Merkerson; Sam Waterston; Carey Lowell; Steven Hill
- No. of episodes: 24

Release
- Original network: NBC
- Original release: September 24, 1997 – May 20, 1998

Season chronology
- ← Previous; Season 7 Next → Season 9

The eighth season of the legal drama Law & Order aired on NBC from September 24, 1997, to May 20, 1998, and consisted of 24 episodes.

== Cast ==
The cast of season 8 remained unchanged from season 7, for the first time in the show's history. Carey Lowell, who played Jamie Ross, left the series at the end of the 8th season but made a special guest appearance as a Defense Attorney in the 10th-season episode "Justice" and the 11th-season episode "School Daze", as well as going on to play Ross, who had become a judge, on Law & Order: Trial by Jury. This is the first season without an appearance by Carolyn McCormick as Dr. Elizabeth Olivet since her debut in season 2.

=== Main ===
- Jerry Orbach as Senior Detective Lennie Briscoe
- Benjamin Bratt as Junior Detective Rey Curtis
- S. Epatha Merkerson as Lieutenant Anita Van Buren
- Sam Waterston as Executive Assistant District Attorney Jack McCoy
- Carey Lowell as Assistant District Attorney Jamie Ross
- Steven Hill as District Attorney Adam Schiff

=== Recurring ===
- J. K. Simmons as Dr. Emil Skoda
- Leslie Hendrix as M.E. Dr. Elizabeth Rodgers
- John Fiore as Detective Tony Profaci

=== Guest stars ===
- Richard Belzer as BPD Detective John Munch
- Yaphet Kotto as BPD Lieutenant Al Giardello
- Jon Seda as BPD Det. Paul Falsone
- Tovah Feldshuh as Defense Attorney Danielle Melnick

== Episodes ==
No. overall	No. in season	Title	Directed by	Written by	Original release date	Prod. code	U.S. viewers (millions)
158	1	"Thrill"	Martha Mitchell	René Balcer	September 24, 1997	K2508	17.58
Detectives Briscoe and Curtis break the seemingly random murder of Matthew Wheeler, a fried chicken deliverer, which was discovered to be a thrill killing, with a little "undercover" work in the park, but McCoy and Ross face a harder battle to get a conviction when the two defendants Joey Timon and Dale Kershaw resolutely point the finger at each other, and the one item identifying the actual killer is the recording of a confession-made to a priest. Meanwhile, Detective Curtis learns that his wife has multiple sclerosis. Note: Based on the April 1997 Thomas Koskovich and Jayson Vreeland case.
159	2	"Denial"	Christopher Misiano	S : René Balcer; S/T : David Shore	October 1, 1997	K2504	14.28
Bloody sheets and an apparently stolen credit card lead Briscoe and Curtis to a pair of college-age lovers Christina Talbert and Tommy Horton, who present McCoy and Ross with a united front of denial that one of them killed their newborn son and disposed of the body. Cast: First recurring appearance by J. K. Simmons as Dr. Emil Skoda. Note: Based on the Amy Grossberg and Brian Peterson case and the Melissa Drexler case.
160	3	"Navy Blues"	Jace Alexander	S : Dick Wolf; S/T : Kathy McCormick	October 8, 1997	K2510	11.79
McCoy finds himself battling the Navy and the office of the Judge Advocate General as he tries to prosecute female pilot Kirstin Blair, accused of murdering her married lover Robert Stroud after he tried to break off with her. Note: Inspired by the 1997 U.S. Air Force sex scandal involving Lt. Kelly Flinn.
161	4	"Harvest"	Matthew Penn	S : René Balcer; S/T : I.C. Rapoport	October 15, 1997	K2506	14.18
A discrepancy concerning the time of death of Nancy O' Neal, a drive-by shooting victim, leads McCoy and Ross to initiate prosecutions against both the shooter, Elias Camacho, and doctor Donald Cosgrove, who harvested her organs as transplant donations. Note: Inspired by a piece on 60 Minutes about people being shot in Los Angeles drive-bys.
162	5	"Nullification"	Constantine Makris	David Black	October 22, 1997	K2507	12.98
After Briscoe and Curtis trace an eagle tattoo on a man shot and killed while holding up an armored truck to a group of militia members, McCoy finds himself facing one of their number as the pro se counsel for his friends, arguing for the concept of "jury nullification", the right of a jury to protect a defendant from an unjust law by acquittal despite the evidence. Note: Inspired by Militia actions such as the sieges of Ruby Ridge, Idaho and Waco, Texas, the Oklahoma City bombing and the trial of the Chicago Seven. Writer David Black said while researching for the episode that he found some aspects of the movement to be bigoted, but found that some of it reminded him of "original revolutionists of America. They do sound like Tom Paine and Thomas Jefferson... I don't think they should use terrorist tactics, but philosophically I have some sympathy."
163	6	"Baby, It's You"	Ed Sherin	Jorge Zamacona	October 29, 1997	K2511	16.01
It's old home week for Briscoe when an apparent murder of Britney Janaway, a teenage model in New York City, develops ties to Baltimore, and Detectives Munch and Falsone pay a visit to the Big Apple to observe the case. Meanwhile, McCoy finds himself battling the attorney of the victim's parents for access to his clients while also battling the Baltimore DA for jurisdiction. Note: This episode begins a crossover event that concludes on Homicide: Life on the Street season 6 episode 5 "Baby, It's You". Based on the JonBenét Ramsey case. Cast: Special appearances include Richard Belzer as BPD Det. John Munch, Yaphet Kotto as BPD Lieutenant Al Giardello, and Jon Seda as BPD Det. Paul Falsone.
164	7	"Blood"	Jace Alexander	S : René Balcer; S/T : Craig Tepper	November 5, 1997	K2502	15.13
The paternity of a black baby placed for adoption by Karen Burdett, a white wealthy mother who later fell from an apartment balcony, might provide a clue to her murderer, but it also unearths some long-buried family secrets that it seems more than one person would kill to keep hidden.
165	8	"Shadow"	Matthew Penn	Richard Sweren	November 12, 1997	K2505	14.81
The murder of bail bondsman Manny Erlich looks fairly routine until the chance words of the chief suspect uncover possible case-fixing between a shady lawyer and an unknown contact within the judicial system.
166	9	"Burned"	Constantine Makris	Siobhan Byrne	November 19, 1997	K2501	14.24
A message overheard on an answering machine leads Briscoe and Curtis to a confessed murderer and the home of wealthy Carl Anderton, an old friend of Adam Schiff, whose stubborn non-cooperation with the district attorney threatens to create a serious miscarriage of justice. Guest starring: Bob Dishy as Defense Attorney Lawrence "Larry" Weaver.
167	10	"Ritual"	Brian Mertes	Kathy McCormick & Richard Sweren	November 26, 1997	K2516	13.88
Curtis and Briscoe investigate the death of Josef Moussad, an Arab man found behind a dumpster, the victim of an apparent mugging. The detectives soon realize that Moussad had brought a doctor into the country to perform a clitoridectomy on his young niece, and suspicion turns to the family. Ross is horrified that young Alison's grandmother and uncle were both in full support of the operation, which makes it hard for her to prosecute the case objectively. Note: Based on heightened concern over female genital mutilation.
168	11	"Under the Influence"	Adam Davidson	René Balcer	December 17, 1997	K2517	16.98
After events in "Aftershock", Briscoe and Curtis finally determine who was driving the car that killed three people. The legal prosecution stands in danger of becoming a kangaroo court when McCoy's feelings over Kincaid mesh with the political agenda of Gary Feldman, an ambitious judge anxious to make an example of the defendant to boost his election chances against Adam Schiff.
169	12	"Expert"	Lewis H. Gould	David Shore & I.C. Rapoport	January 21, 1998	K2518	13.55
The shooting of two people in a restaurant restroom takes some abrupt turns as they try to discover who exactly the intended victim Lindsay Carson was, and the prosecutors have to deal with a defendant claiming to have been in a dissociative state while committing the crime — the same defense used years before by the defendant's father.
170	13	"Castoff"	Gloria Muzio	David Black & Harold Schechter	February 4, 1998	K2512	15.59
The street murder of Jennifer Gaylin, a woman who worked with underprivileged kids, takes a turn towards the bizarre when the detectives uncover she had a predilection for kinky sex, and that one of her current partners appears to be serial killer Eddie Chandler, who offers an overexposure to television violence as his defense during his trial. Note: Based on the Andrew Cunanan case.
171	14	"Grief"	Christopher Misiano	Suzanne Oshry	February 11, 1998	K2514	14.56
As Briscoe and Curtis try to pin down the specifics of an assault on George Harding, a man reluctant to discuss it, they uncover the alleged rape of two women in custodial care. But as the prosecutors attempt to prepare their case, a reluctant witness changes their view of the cases.
172	15	"Faccia a Faccia"	Martha Mitchell	René Balcer & Eddie Feldmann	February 18, 1998	K2519	13.78
Taking on an apparent Mafia murder, Detectives Briscoe and Curtis are stymied by a dead witness and a seemingly incoherent mob boss.
173	16	"Divorce"	Constantine Makris	Barry M. Schkolnick	February 25, 1998	K2520	14.71
The stabbing death of Linda Burke, a psychologist, draws Detectives Briscoe and Curtis into a heated divorce case and pits prosecutors McCoy and Ross against a manipulative attorney.
174	17	"Carrier"	J. Ranelli	David Black	March 4, 1998	K2525	12.73
The death of May Kiley, a college student, leads to a case involving an HIV-positive male who's seeking to infect as many young women as possible. McCoy, testing right-to-privacy ethics, wants to charge him with murder.
175	18	"Stalker"	Richard Dobbs	Kathy McCormick	March 11, 1998	K2523	16.38
When a woman, Andrea Blake, is found unconscious at the bottom of her apartment stairs, Briscoe and Curtis must figure out what happened — before it's too late. In order to make his case, McCoy pits the two detectives against each other in the courtroom.
176	19	"Disappeared"	David Platt	Richard Sweren & William N. Fordes	April 1, 1998	K2528	14.20
A defendant, Matthew O'Dell, refuses to allow his lawyer to raise the issue of insanity. This complicates matters for the brother who turned him in with hopes of securing medical treatment for him. Guest starring: Tovah Feldshuh as Defense Attorney Danielle Melnick. Note: Based on the Ted Kaczynski case.
177	20	"Burden"	Constantine Makris	David Shore & I.C. Rapoport	April 22, 1998	K2526	11.34
After Michael Sutter, a 12-year-old quadriplegic, dies at home in his bed, paramedics claim that he was suffocated and the suspects include the boy's parents and sister.
178	21	"Bad Girl"	Jace Alexander	René Balcer & Richard Sweren	April 29, 1998	K2524	14.26
Schiff's re-election may hinge on the stabbing death of police officer Dana Flynn; Briscoe's daughter is arrested for dealing drugs. Guest starring: Isabel Gillies as Monica Johnson. Notes: Gillies went on to portray Kathy Stabler, wife of Elliot Stabler, in Law & Order: Special Victims Unit. Based on the Karla Faye Tucker case.
179	22	"Damaged"	Constantine Makris	Janis Diamond	May 6, 1998	K2522	14.27
The case of a teacher's shooting uncovers a vendetta involving the rape of a mentally challenged co-ed by three students, whose attorney claims they weren't aware of her condition. Briscoe is devastated to learn of his daughter Cathy's death at the hands of a killer that an unknown prosecutor failed to convict. Guest starring: Ron McLarty as Trial Judge William Wright and Lauren Ambrose as Valerie Maxwell.
180	23	"Tabloid"	Brian Mertes	S : Alec Baldwin; S/T : David Black	May 13, 1998	K2515	13.28
Tabloid journalism comes under scrutiny during the investigations into the deaths of a gossip columnist and a celebrity target he pursued. Guest starring: John Slattery as Arlen Levitt.
181	24	"Monster"	Ed Sherin	René Balcer & Richard Sweren	May 20, 1998	K2527	14.80
Ten year-old Malika Richardson is raped and rendered comatose by a pedophile. A snitch offers Briscoe a chance to avenge his daughter's death. The NYPD brass is looking to force Lieutenant Van Buren out of her job. McCoy must contend with Judge Feldman as an adversary both at trial and outside the courtroom due to an ethics complaint the judge filed against him. While all of this goes on, Schiff begins to consider the possibility that Feldman might defeat him in the election. At episode's end, Ross resigns from her job as an ADA to devote more time to her family life and her ongoing divorce. Cast: Last regular appearance of Carey Lowell as Assistant District Attorney Jamie Ross.
