= Law & Order season 16 =

Season of American television series

Law & Order
- Season 16
- Season 16 U.S. DVD cover
- Starring: Dennis Farina; Jesse L. Martin; S. Epatha Merkerson; Sam Waterston; Annie Parisse; Fred Dalton Thompson
- No. of episodes: 22

Release
- Original network: NBC
- Original release: September 21, 2005 – May 17, 2006

Season chronology
- ← Previous; Season 15 Next → Season 17

The sixteenth season of Law & Order premiered on NBC on September 21, 2005, and concluded on May 17, 2006. This was just the second season in which the show's principal cast remained unchanged from the previous season, as Annie Parisse joined the series midway through season 15, following the departure of Elisabeth Röhm.

== Cast and crew changes ==
Jesse L. Martin returned to his role of Detective Ed Green for the season, after he was temporarily written off near the end of the previous season to reprise his role in the film adaptation of the Broadway musical Rent.

Parisse quit the series late in the season, wanting out of her contract. A show insider said to Fox News, "She saw the writing on the wall, they never treated her very well. They were always complaining about her hair. And they also thought she looked too young next to Sam Waterson (sic)." Parisse's character, ADA Alexandra Borgia, was brutally killed off in the season finale episode, "Invaders."

Less than two weeks after that episode aired, it was announced that Dennis Farina (Detective Joe Fontana) was also leaving the cast. Farina wished to pursue other offers and projects being developed by his production company. Dick Wolf said that he respected Farina's decision and looked forward to working with him again.

There were "a lot" of firings, including a portion of the camera crew. "None of the original writer-producers are there anymore," a source said to Fox News. "They've all been replaced by people from L.A. who don't get the show." Walon Green was the showrunner/executive producer for the season, along with Nicholas Wootton, Matthew Penn, and Peter Jankowski. Green stepped down at the end of the season and Wootton took over in the 17th season.

== Cast ==
=== Main ===
- Dennis Farina as Senior Detective Joe Fontana
- Jesse L. Martin as Junior Detective Ed Green
- S. Epatha Merkerson as Lieutenant Anita Van Buren
- Sam Waterston as Executive Assistant District Attorney Jack McCoy
- Annie Parisse as Assistant District Attorney Alexandra Borgia
- Fred Dalton Thompson as District Attorney Arthur Branch

=== Recurring ===
- Carolyn McCormick as Dr. Elizabeth Olivet
- Leslie Hendrix as M.E. Dr. Elizabeth Rodgers
- John Cariani as CSU Technician Julian Beck
- Selenis Leyva as Detective Mariluz Rivera

=== Guest ===
- Mariska Hargitay as Detective Olivia Benson
- Ice-T as Detective Fin Tutuola
- Richard Brooks as Defense Attorney Paul Robinette
- Tovah Feldshuh as Defense Attorney Danielle Melnick
- Dylan Baker as Defense Attorney Sanford Rems
- Michael Imperioli as Detective Nick Falco

== Episodes ==
No. overall	No. in season	Title	Directed by	Written by	Original release date	Prod. code	U.S. viewers (millions)
350	1	"Red Ball"	Matthew Penn	David Wilcox	September 21, 2005	16001	13.04
When Jennifer Clark, a five-year-old girl, is abducted from her mother in broad daylight during an apparent carjacking, Detectives Fontana and Green canvass the streets, only to uncover a more sinister motive when they discover the car intact but no trace of the girl. The investigators soon unearth an ex-convict with the child's bloodied dress who refuses to talk until his release is guaranteed. With time and leads running out and the prospect of the girl's safe return looking unlikely, EADA McCoy and ADA Borgia consider a deal with severe legal and political ramifications.
351	2	"Flaw"	Jean de Segonzac	Chris Levinson	September 28, 2005	16002	15.06
When the body of Patrick Sullivan is found with Olivia Benson's number in his cell phone, Green and Fontana call the Special Victims Unit squad to help them with their case. Although not initially clear, the detectives soon realize that Sullivan is connected to Lorraine Dillon (Lynda Carter) and April Troost (Estella Warren), career criminals that Benson had previously been unable to catch. Lorraine confesses to the crime and claims she did it to protect her daughter, but tells a different story when April ends up on the stand, and McCoy and Benson disagree on which of the two is telling the truth.: This episode concludes a story that begins on Law & Order: Special Victims Unit in "Design".
352	3	"Ghosts"	Constantine Makris	Rick Eid	October 5, 2005	16003	12.60
A criminal, Dan Flood (Ari Fliakos), makes a surprising deathbed confession that compels Detective Fontana to re-open his own 10-year-old cold case file concerning the murder of Sarah Dolan, a 12-year-old girl. Instead of the victim's father (Raymond J. Barry), whom Fontana is certain committed the crime, the new prime suspect is a former drug-addict (David Vadim) whose jailhouse confession to the prosecution's most viable witness (Gano Grills) is disqualified on the grounds it was made in a spiritual context. Despite dwindling options, Executive Assistant D.A. McCoy continues to pursue a murder-two conviction despite a stern warning from his wary boss, District Attorney Branch, who cautions against the fallout of losing this high-profile case again.
353	4	"Age of Innocence"	David Platt	Davey Holmes	October 12, 2005	16005	10.92
A car bomb kills the husband of an incapacitated woman shortly before the victim planned to disconnect her feeding tube, and when Detectives Fontana and Green wade into the politically charged case, they find the bombmaker who points them to suspects that include the woman's angry family and clergy. As national media arrive, EADA McCoy and ADA Borgia engage in a frustrating shell game where each suspect seems to have a mutually bulletproof alibi.
354	5	"Lifeline"	Rosemary Rodriguez	Greg Plageman	October 26, 2005	16006	12.33
When the body of undercover reporter Teresa Richter is discovered, police soon realize her death is connected to the story she was working on about a Latin gang, L-12. Their investigation leads them to Kevin Drucker (William Sadler), a businessman who reported his car stolen but who was really paying off members of L-12 not to hurt his son Patterson (Brad Fleischer), who was imprisoned on the same cell block with many of the gang members. McCoy and Borgia realize that the only way they can get to L-12, who ordered the hit on Richter, is to get Drucker to testify. Drucker is reluctant to do so, however, unless his son's safety can be guaranteed.
355	6	"Birthright"	Constantine Makris	David Slack	November 2, 2005	16007	12.57
Teenage suspect Traci Sands (Adepero Oduye) dies in police custody after being arrested for the murder of Sam Register, the man who reported her to child protective services. Rodgers reveals that she died because someone outfitted her with a benecrine I.U.D. that reacted fatally with her sickle-cell condition. Fontana and Green follow the trail to a charitable clinic and nurse Gloria Rhodes (Stephanie Roth Haberle), who believes she is saving the world by sterilizing women that she does not believe are worthy of having children. McCoy faces former assistant district attorney Paul Robinette (Richard Brooks) in court as Robinette defends Rhodes.
356	7	"House of Cards"	Michael Pressman	Wendy Battles	November 9, 2005	16008	10.86
Fontana and Green investigate when the body of Chelsea Haggerty, a young mother who had recently cleaned up her life is found in her apartment, with her five-day-old infant son Nicholas missing. Detectives soon track down Arlene Tarrington (Wendy Moniz) and ascertain that the infant she is claiming is hers is really baby Nicholas, but after her lawyers make a claim of post-partum psychosis and another man (Victor Verhaeghe) comes forward claiming to be the child's father, McCoy and Borgia are forced to decide which of the two they would rather lock up for the crime.
357	8	"New York Minute"	Don Scardino	Nicholas Wootton	November 16, 2005	16009	11.44
When Clayton Stack, the owner of a big-rig trucking company is shot to death, Detectives Fontana and Green learn that the victim was hauling illegal aliens and suspect a member (Daniel Roebuck) of a citizen's border patrol group; but their only witness is an undocumented Hispanic woman (Aixa Rosario Medina) who risks deportation if she testifies. Meanwhile, prosecutor McCoy is incensed when the witness is physically intimidated as he tries to turn one organization member against the other in court.
358	9	"Criminal Law"	Ed Sherin	David Wilcox	November 23, 2005	16010	11.93
The deaths of three women with the same name lead Fontana and Green to the nine-year-old conviction of Leland Barnes, who had shot and killed his wife in an office full of people. With two of the three witnesses against him dead and Jack McCoy on the hit list, the detectives struggle to determine how Barnes, who has been in prison the entire time, got someone on the outside to kill the only people who could keep him in jail. The investigation leads them to Leland's two sons, with surprising results.
359	10	"Acid"	Michael Pressman	Richard Sweren	November 30, 2005	16011	12.87
After the daughter of one of Van Buren's college friends is found dead in her room, a suicide, Van Buren joins Green and Fontana in hunting down the man who burned her face with acid months earlier, ultimately leading to her suicide. Van Buren is unsuccessful in getting a lot of help from her friend, who is terrified that the man who destroyed her elder daughter's life will destroy her younger daughter as well. McCoy and Borgia's case hits a snag when Van Buren takes the stand and comes close to committing perjury to keep Jason Corley behind bars.
360	11	"Bible Story"	Rick Wallace	Richard Sweren	December 7, 2005	16004	12.13
Jeffrey Kilgore is found murdered after destroying the Speicher family Chumash, which had been brought to America from Poland years earlier. Green and Fontana follow the trail of evidence to Barry Speicher, who confesses to the murder, but it's his cousin Eric that McCoy has his eye on after Barry's wife tells them that Eric had everything to gain by Barry going to prison. McCoy and Borgia pursue the matter to trial, but their star witness turns on them.
361	12	"Family Friend"	Jean de Segonzac	Philippe Browning	January 11, 2006	16012	12.83
After Philip and Valerie Messick are attacked in their home, Green and Fontana follow the trail to a small-time thug named Jay Fleckner. After Valerie's testimony unintentionally helps free Fleckner, he is found dead, and detectives soon realize that Bob Cerullo, a family friend of Valerie and her late husband, was the triggerman. Unfortunately, when McCoy attempts to prosecute Cerullo, a retired cop, he threatens to claim that he deliberately planted evidence in his past cases in an attempt to get McCoy to drop all the charges.
362	13	"Heart of Darkness"	Richard Dobbs	Carter Harris	January 18, 2006	16013	12.38
A journalist's suicide becomes suspect after Green and Fontana find evidence at the scene suggesting that it was not a suicide after all. Their suspicions turn to the reporter's girlfriend after learning that he was still sleeping with his ex, but their investigation soon leads them in a different direction.
363	14	"Magnet"	Adam Bernstein	David Black	February 8, 2006	16014	14.53
Detectives Fontana and Green investigate the strangling of Alex Garcia, a promising Hispanic student at a private magnet school. The men soon learn the victim was selling test answers and writing term papers for more privileged students, including their prime suspect, Greg Loomis (Jaime McAdams), a trouble-prone senior who would kill just to graduate. After Loomis' arrest, Jack McCoy spurns any deal with his high-powered attorney Rebecca Shane (Kathleen Turner) but has to overcome her vigorous defense that her client himself was a victim of medication side effects.
364	15	"Choice of Evils"	Michael Pressman	David Wilcox	February 15, 2006	16016	12.39
After the body of Danny Ashburn, a teenage boy, is found dead in a warehouse, detectives use DNA to connect the boy to a convicted rapist and serial killer, then to the boy's mother, Allison Ashburn, the convict's ex-wife. While trying to solve Danny's murder, Fontana and Green learn that he recently got his girlfriend Tina pregnant, and his mother had seen him recently when she had given him money despite having claimed she had not seen him for months. Allison finally admits that she murdered her son after the police arrest her new husband John, but claims she did it to save the world from her son, whom she was convinced would become a monster just like his biological father. Borgia and McCoy face an uphill battle trying to convict the perfect soccer mom.
365	16	"Cost of Capital"	Michael Watkins	S : Rick Eid; T : Tom Smuts	March 1, 2006	16015	11.79
After Derek Miller, a young African-American banking associate, is found murdered, Detectives Fontana and Green discover that he had hundreds of thousands of dollars in his checking account. The detectives suspect the victim was having an affair with his high-powered boss Sophia (Lisa Zane) who killed him out of fear and rage. As the police and EADA Jack McCoy build their case, everything hinges on using either the executive's estranged husband (Martin Donovan) or their shaky teenaged daughter Katie (Sarah Steele) as their star witness.
366	17	"America, Inc."	Jean de Segonzac	Richard Sweren	March 22, 2006	16017	9.00
After Jeffrey Pope, a private military contractor, is found dead in a hotel room, suspicion eventually leads Green and Fontana to Robbie Howell (Adam Scott), the younger brother of a man who died because of Pope's incompetence, and Kevin Boatman, Nick Howell's former co-worker who had witnessed the tragic events in Iraq. Danielle Melnick (Tovah Feldshuh) returns to defend Robbie and Kevin, and in the courtroom Kevin drops the bombshell that he knows where Pope and his men were keeping an Iraqi prisoner of war, a wanted terrorist. McCoy and Branch butt heads over whether or not to let Kevin Boatman get away with murder in order to get their hands on the prisoner.
367	18	"Thinking Makes It So"	Tony Goldwyn	Michael S. Chernuchin	March 29, 2006	16019	9.35
Fontana and Green investigate when a bank manager is involved in the robbing of his own bank and learn that his daughter is being held hostage and that he had to go along with the robbery or risk losing his daughter. One man is killed in the robbery, but the two detectives track down his accomplice and, while alone with Mitchell Lowell, Fontana uses extreme force to get the answers he needs, prompting Lowell's lawyer to claim that all the information Fontana obtained is fruit of the poison tree. McCoy works to fight the claim of police brutality while also trying to find a way to get around Fontana's actions.
368	19	"Positive"	Richard Dobbs	Sonny Postiglione	April 12, 2006	16020	10.84
When Jeremy Miller a teenage boy, commits suicide after firing on a doctor and hitting an innocent party, Fontana and Green investigate why he was after the doctor to begin with and learn that Jeremy Miller's younger sister had recently died of AIDS. Throughout the course of the investigation, detectives are led to Dr. Andrew Copelan, the doctor in charge of Emily Miller's care, who had been giving her an experimental AIDS drug not yet approved for usage on humans, ostensibly to find a cure for his own AIDS.
369	20	"Kingmaker"	Don Scardino	David Slack	May 3, 2006	16018	10.66
After undercover cop Dana Baker is murdered, Fontana and Green learn that the man who killed her had discovered her identity after seeing a photograph of her in the paper revealing her as an undercover police officer, not the heroin dealer she was posing as. Investigating the story leads detectives to Eric Lund (Garret Dillahunt), one of the workers in Congressman Prescott's office, but Lund seems to have an ironclad alibi after an e-mail he sent comes to light.
370	21	"Hindsight"	Jean de Segonzac	Chris Levinson	May 10, 2006	16021	12.68
Detectives Fontana and Green are skeptical when Detective Falco (Michael Imperioli) finds a young woman he took home the night before slashed to death in his bathroom. Anxious to exonerate himself of this crime, Falco takes steps that could be indicative of a cover-up instead of an unauthorized pursuit of the true culprit. Fortunately, Detectives Fontana and Green believe their colleague was drugged by the victim in a plan to rob him but was instead dispatched by a violent female rival. Proving it in court is difficult for Jack McCoy, who must sort through a family of cons and ex-cons, some with ties to Falco, all resulting in a final twist of fate.
371	22	"Invaders"	Matthew Penn	Richard Sweren & David Wilcox	May 17, 2006	16022	13.59
The latest murder victims of two home invaders are the family members of a man who once sold fake D.E.A. badges to the killers and then began secretly cooperating with police. The case takes a harrowing turn when one of the law enforcement teams is put in the line of fire. In a legal gambit, Executive ADA Jack McCoy must then risk his career, and those of others as well, by bending the rules and using corrupt DEA Agent Almonte (Ritchie Coster) to lure out his co-conspirators – the sadistic psychopaths. Meanwhile, the police and the DAs have to deal with the loss of one of their own when Almonte sends his co-conspirators after ADA Borgia in the midst of the case.
