= Law & Order season 17 =

Season of American television series

Law & Order
- Season 17
- Season 17 U.S. DVD cover
- Starring: Jesse L. Martin; Milena Govich; S. Epatha Merkerson; Sam Waterston; Alana de la Garza; Fred Dalton Thompson
- No. of episodes: 22

Release
- Original network: NBC
- Original release: September 22, 2006 – May 18, 2007

Season chronology
- ← Previous; Season 16 Next → Season 18

The seventeenth season of Law & Order premiered on NBC on September 22, 2006, and concluded on May 18, 2007. This is the last season to feature Fred Thompson (Arthur Branch), the only season to feature Milena Govich and the first season to feature Alana de la Garza.

== Cast changes ==
Following the departures of Dennis Farina and Annie Parisse at the end of the 16th season, Govich and de la Garza joined the cast as Detective Nina Cassady and Assistant District Attorney Connie Rubirosa, respectively. Jesse L. Martin's character (Ed Green) was promoted to senior detective to replace Farina's character. At the end of the season, Fred Thompson (Arthur Branch) and Milena Govich departed the cast. Former cast member Richard Brooks reprised his role as Paul Robinette for the episode "Fear America".

== Cast ==
=== Main ===
- Jesse L. Martin as Senior Detective Ed Green
- Milena Govich as Junior Detective Nina Cassady
- S. Epatha Merkerson as Lieutenant Anita Van Buren
- Sam Waterston as Executive Assistant District Attorney Jack McCoy
- Alana de la Garza as Assistant District Attorney Connie Rubirosa
- Fred Dalton Thompson as District Attorney Arthur Branch

=== Recurring ===
- Carolyn McCormick as Dr. Elizabeth Olivet
- Leslie Hendrix as M.E. Dr. Elizabeth Rodgers
- John Cariani as CSU Technician Julian Beck

=== Guest ===
- Richard Brooks as Defense Attorney Paul Robinette
- Tovah Feldshuh as Defense Attorney Danielle Melnick
- Selenis Leyva as Detective Mariluz Rivera

== Episodes ==
No. overall	No. in season	Title	Directed by	Written by	Original release date	Prod. code	U.S. viewers (millions)
372	1	"Fame"	Jean de Segonzac	Nicholas Wootton	September 22, 2006	17001	11.07
Ed Green and his new partner, Nina Cassady, investigate the death of a cop killed during a botched robbery which leads them to stolen photographs of a celebrity mother married to a rapper who has motive for wanting the photos. Cast: First appearances of Milena Govich as Junior Detective Nina Cassady, and Alana de la Garza as Assistant District Attorney Connie Rubirosa.
373	2	"Avatar"	Vincent Misiano	David Slack	September 29, 2006	17002	10.03
Green and Cassady investigate after the photograph of a dead woman is found on a popular website, B-Frendz.com. Their investigation leads them to a mentally-disturbed young man the victim's teenage daughter claims kidnapped and raped her, but his lawyer offers up an even greater incentive: the supposed kidnapping victim, Molly Preston.
374	3	"Home Sweet"	Richard Dobbs	Michael S. Chernuchin	October 6, 2006	17003	9.64
When eight-year-old Jenna Wechsler dies as a result of a building explosion, Green and Cassady follow the trail of evidence to Rosalie Schaffner, the owner's ex-wife. McCoy and Rubirosa pursue Rosalie Schaffner despite a lack of concrete evidence, but the case takes a turn when Rubirosa finds a piece of evidence that points them in a new direction.
375	4	"Fear America"	Constantine Makris	Sonny Postiglione & Robert Nathan	October 13, 2006	17004	9.43
After Eric Khalaby is seen being murdered on tape in what appears to be an American movement against Islam, Green and Cassady investigate the case which leads them to Khalaby's cousin-in-law Ben Faoud, who appears to be connected to a terrorist cell functioning inside New York. Unfortunately, the best link to Faoud appears to surround a recent shipment of uranium, which McCoy and Rubirosa are forbidden to mention by the federal government. When news of the uranium leaks out, McCoy and Rubirosa find themselves the victims of intense federal scrutiny, and Paul Robinette's vigorous defense of young Faoud does not help matters. Guest starring: Richard Brooks as Paul Robinette
376	5	"Public Service Homicide"	Constantine Makris	Chris Levinson	October 20, 2006	17005	10.20
When Carl Mullaly is discovered murdered in his apartment, Green and Cassady learn that he had recently been profiled on HardFocus, a tabloid talk show that exposes sex offenders who are caught via the ScumWatch website. With an eight-year-old girl as the only eyewitness, detectives arrest the murderer, but McCoy and Rubirosa soon learn that HardFocus is a lot more involved than they claim.
377	6	"Profiteer"	Arthur W. Forney	David Wilcox	October 27, 2006	17007	9.02
The shooting of Gary Howard a local businessman is linked to a killing in Iraq, and McCoy and Rubirosa refuse to allow the killer to plead out.
378	7	"In Vino Veritas"	Tim Hunter	David Wilcox	November 3, 2006	17006	10.87
A has-been actor Mitch Carroll, wearing bloodstained clothing and arrested for drunk driving, reveals religious prejudices during his rantings. The detectives soon discover a Jewish producer dead, and try to find his connection to the murder. Guest starring: Chevy Chase. Note: Inspired by the events surrounding Mel Gibson.
379	8	"Release"	Michael Pressman	Rick Eid & Nicholas Wootton	November 10, 2006	17008	9.57
After Hudson Moore is found bludgeoned in the back of the Babes Being Bad bus, suspicion initially turns to the company's creator, Chris Drake, until video footage leads detectives to a young woman who was with Moore the night that he died. After concentrating their investigation on the young woman, the reasons behind Moore's murder soon become apparent, and McCoy and Rubirosa struggle to prosecute a man who, while not directly responsible for the murder, may have been responsible for the incidents that led up to it.
380	9	"Deadlock"	Alex Chapple	David Slack	November 17, 2006	17009	9.94
Green and Cassady hunt mass murderer Leon Vorgitch, who recently escaped from prison. They finally corner Vorgitch in a school with a room full of hostages, and before surrendering himself to police, Vorgitch shoots a number of innocent children, killing four. His unwillingness to accept a deal infuriates McCoy, as it gives him more time to escape prison again. When the father of one of his victims takes justice into his own hands and ends up being used as a campaign slogan for a local politician, McCoy and Rubirosa try to convince Robert Purcell not to let himself be a scapegoat for a political platform.
381	10	"Corner Office"	Joan Stein Schimke	Rick Eid & Richard Sweren	December 8, 2006	17010	10.23
After corporate attorney Charles Dillon is discovered dead in a hotel room, Green and Cassady investigate and learn that the company he was working for is in the process of being indicted. Their investigation leads them to a high-priced callgirl, Julia Veloso, who turns out to have been romantically involved with the company's CEO, Samantha Weaver. McCoy and Rubirosa find themselves at odds as Rubirosa wonders if McCoy's prosecution of Weaver has more to do with her gender than her guilt.
382	11	"Remains of the Day"	Constantine Makris	S : Shiya Ribowsky; S/T : David Wilcox	January 5, 2007	17011	9.77
After Michael Jones dies in his mother's hospital room with no immediate explanation, his mother Ashley accuses her former husband's adult children, Miles and Hillary Foster, who are fighting her for control of their father's substantial fortune. The autopsy rules out the Fosters, and points Green and Cassady in the direction of illegally harvested donor bones, which Jones had received in a transplant eighteen months prior. McCoy and Rubirosa struggle to prosecute the case after it becomes clear the only way they will get the evidence they need is to test another young man who received bone grafts from the same woman who had given Michael Jones his legs.
383	12	"Charity Case"	Michael Pressman	Nicholas Wootton	January 12, 2007	17012	9.02
Green and Cassady investigate after Sean Archer, a producer who had recently adopted a child from Africa with his wife, well-known actress Sofia Archer, is gunned down outside an ice cream shop while holding baby Christopher. The shooting is soon linked to the recent adoption of Christopher, which had received international scrutiny because it appeared to have been pushed through based on the couple's celebrity status. McCoy and Rubirosa initially investigate the murder of Sean Archer, which soon turns into an investigation of a child's death when the identity of baby Christopher comes under question. Guest starring: Jennifer Beals as Sofia Archer.
384	13	"Talking Points"	Matthew Penn	Michael S. Chernuchin	February 2, 2007	17013	9.53
The shooting of university student Jason Miles at a political rally hosted by controversial speaker Judith Barlow leaves any number of suspects, but after Green and Cassady prove that two of the people they've questioned are lying about their alibis, they turn their attention to Malcom Yates, a grad student who claimed to be with Jason's girlfriend at the time of his death. McCoy and Rubirosa realize that Yates went after Barlow because of her open criticism of stem-cell research, something that Yates had high hopes could help find a cure for his own Parkinson's.
385	14	"Church"	Constantine Makris	Rick Eid	February 9, 2007	17014	9.63
A reverend is accused of the murder of Jeff Cantwell a young gay actor, but McCoy and Rubirosa soon learn that he may not be the guilty party.
386	15	"Melting Pot"	Jean de Segonzac	Richard Sweren	February 16, 2007	17015	9.01
After Erin Garrett, an actress and director, is found dead in her apartment, Green and Cassady attempt to prove that her death was not a suicide after discovering that someone had been attempting to suppress a film she had been making about abuse of women under Islam. Upon finding two prime suspects, a Muslim sound engineer outraged by the film and construction worker Julio Rodriguez who was threatened by Garrett moments before she was killed, McCoy and Rubirosa uncover a scheme at Rodriguez's place of work to make millions in unpaid illegal labor that could've gone up in smoke if Garrett exposed it, leading to the discovery of another suspect at risk of losing everything. Note: Inspired by the murder of actress Adrienne Shelly, who herself guest starred in a Season 10 episode of Law & Order entitled "High & Low".
387	16	"Murder Book"	Constantine Makris	David Wilcox	February 23, 2007	17016	8.67
After publisher Serena Darby is found murdered in her apartment, suspicion turns to J.P. Lange, a former professional baseball player acquitted of his wife's murder who had written a book hypothesizing how he would have committed the murder. Green and Cassady follow the trail of evidence from Lange to Gerald Stockwell, a former ghostwriter on the book, but Stockwell tries to clear himself by offering McCoy and Rubirosa proof that one of the jurors in Lange's trial was paid off to force an acquittal.
388	17	"Good Faith"	Sam Weisman	David Slack	March 30, 2007	17017	7.47
Green and Cassady investigate an arson turned homicide when a body found in a burned church turns out to have been murdered before the fire started. Cast: Last appearance by Tovah Feldshuh as Danielle Melnick in the original Law & Order series.
389	18	"Bling"	Karen Gaviola	Matthew McGough	April 6, 2007	17018	8.22
Green and Cassady follow the clues in the shooting death of rapper Clarice James, "Sweet Clarice", first to a sketchy music producer and then to a jeweler who claims Clarice owed him a great deal of cash.
390	19	"Fallout"	Constantine Makris	Sonny Postiglione	April 27, 2007	17019	7.52
Green and Cassady get mixed up with the Russian consulate after Peter Rostov dies of ricin poisoning. Their investigation leads them first to his work, where they learn he spent a great deal of time traveling back and forth between Russia, and secondly to his brother, Karl. It is not long before they link the Rostov brothers to an illegal prostitution ring trafficking in young Russian women, but McCoy is faced with trying to get the remaining Rostov brother to testify so he can prosecute Brezin, the father of one of the trafficked girls.
391	20	"Captive"	Michael Watkins	Richard Sweren	May 4, 2007	17020	8.88
When a young boy is found murdered, Green and Cassady follow the leads to a suspected serial pedophile/murderer, where another captive boy has spent five years as a now willing victim with Stockholm syndrome.
392	21	"Over Here"	Constantine Makris	William N. Fordes	May 11, 2007	17021	8.30
The detectives link the beating deaths of two homeless men to a trio of thieving door-to-door magazine salespeople. The victims turn out to be veterans of the Iraq War, as does one of the salespeople, who suffered a brain injury in combat and was sent to a VA hospital in the US for treatment. McCoy and Rubirosa document the squalid conditions at the hospital, but a judge rules the evidence inadmissible, forcing them to work out a new strategy for prosecuting the killer.
393	22	"The Family Hour"	Matthew Penn	Richard Sweren & David Slack	May 18, 2007	17022	9.23
When Nicole Bailey, the ex-wife of a respected former senator, is found murdered and brutalized in her home, Green and Cassady look first at the senator, but follow the trail of clues to a dysfunctional family with a number of potentially embarrassing secrets. McCoy finds himself in the hot seat when he is forced to argue the case in front of a judge who does not seem mentally prepared to hear murder cases. Cast: Last appearances of Fred Thompson as District Attorney Arthur Branch, and Milena Govich as Detective Nina Cassady. Guest starring: Jeremy Sisto as Clint Glover, defense attorney. Note: Sisto joined the main cast the next season as Detective Cyrus Lupo.
