= Law & Order season 20 =

Season of American television series

Law & Order
- Season 20
- Season 20 U.S. DVD cover
- Starring: Jeremy Sisto; Anthony Anderson; S. Epatha Merkerson; Linus Roache; Alana de la Garza; Sam Waterston
- No. of episodes: 23

Release
- Original network: NBC
- Original release: September 25, 2009 – May 24, 2010

Season chronology
- ← Previous; Season 19 Next → Season 21

The twentieth season of Law & Order premiered on NBC on September 25, 2009, which remained unchanged, for which it was moved from its previous time slot to air on Fridays at 8 p.m. ET for the NBC broadcast. L&O was moved to Monday nights on March 1, 2010, with a two-hour telecast at 9 p.m. ET, before settling into its new time slot at 10 p.m. the following week, March 8.

During the season, The Jay Leno Show in primetime was canceled, and Leno returned to the 11:35 pm Tonight Show because of affiliate dissatisfaction. Three more episodes of Law & Order were ordered to fill the primetime gap, increasing the number of episodes for the season to 23.

In early January, NBC announced the renewal of Law & Order for a 21st season. NBC's President of Primetime Entertainment at the time, Angela Bromstad, said, "I’m a "Law & Order" junkie... I wouldn’t want to be responsible for not having "Law & Order" break the record." However, the network abruptly canceled Law & Order on May 14 after 20 seasons on the air, tying it with Gunsmoke as American network television's longest-running regularly scheduled primetime drama. Gunsmoke would later be surpassed by The Simpsons in 2018 in terms of episodes as the longest primetime scripted television series. The final episode aired on NBC on May 24.

The late announcement of the cancellation resulted in Law & Order not having a "series finale" episode. Had the series continued in the 2010–2011 television season, it would have done so without S. Epatha Merkerson, who had announced prior to the cancellation that she would not return.

Although NBC canceled Law & Order, AMC Network investigated its revival; however, attempts to revive the series failed, and according to series creator Dick Wolf, the series has "moved to the history books". However, on September 28, 2021, NBC announced that the show was being revived and a 21st season had been ordered.

== Cast ==
=== Main cast ===
- Jeremy Sisto as Senior Detective Cyrus Lupo
- Anthony Anderson as Junior Detective Kevin Bernard
- S. Epatha Merkerson as Lieutenant Anita Van Buren
- Linus Roache as Executive Assistant District Attorney Michael Cutter
- Alana de la Garza as Assistant District Attorney Connie Rubirosa
- Sam Waterston as District Attorney Jack McCoy

=== Recurring cast ===
- Leslie Hendrix as M.E. Dr. Elizabeth Rodgers
- Ernie Hudson as Frank Gibson
- J. K. Simmons as Dr. Emil Skoda

=== Notable guest stars ===
- Annaleigh Ashford as Mia
- Kathy Baker as Camille Peterson
- David Alan Basche as Kevin Franklin
- Samantha Bee as Vanessa Carville
- Tammy Blanchard as Dana Silva
- John Bolger as Don Sorenson
- Benjamin Bratt as Rey Curtis
- Kate Burton as Defense Attorney Erica Gardner
- Timothy Busfield as Ray Backlund
- Jonathan Cake as Defense Attorney Marcus Woll
- Camille Chen as Emma Kim
- Anna Chlumsky as Lisa Klein
- Rob Corddry as Jim Leary
- David Costabile as Glen Dolan
- Rebecca Creskoff as Veronica Masters
- Doug E. Doug as Michael Reed
- Adam Driver as Robby Vickery
- Clea DuVall as Amanda Green
- Ned Eisenberg as Defense Attorney James Granick
- Raúl Esparza as Dennis Di Palma
- Sabina Gadecki as Brenna Lane
- Jim Gaffigan as Larry Johnson
- Elliott Gould as Stan Harkavy
- Anna Gunn as Marielle Di Napoli
- Tony Hale as Phillip Shoemaker
- Michael Hollick as Minister
- René Ifrah as Sid Maxwell
- Adriane Lenox as Dolores Martin
- Jennifer Lim as Daisy Chao
- Mark Linn-Baker
- Nina Lisandrello as Belinda Alvarez
- Amy Madigan as Emily Ryan
- Carolyn McCormick as Dr. Elizabeth Olivet
- Emily Meade as Bonnie Jones
- Sean Nelson
- Deirdre O'Connell as Valerie Knight
- Portia Reiners as Jill Sorenson
- Tony Roberts as Senator Bryce Peterson
- Amy Rutberg as Megan Kerik
- Bill Sage
- Peter Scanavino as Jim Anderson
- Ben Schnetzer
- Rich Sommer as Zach Marshall
- Jenna Stern
- Richard Thomas
- Elliot Villar as Dr. Oscar Silva
- Lindsey Vonn as Alicia
- Robin Weigert
- Debra Winger as Martha Woodside

== Episodes ==
No. overall	No. in season	Title	Directed by	Written by	Original release date	Prod. code	U.S. viewers (millions)
434	1	"Memo from the Dark Side"	Fred Berner	René Balcer & Keith Eisner	September 25, 2009	20001	6.25
When young war veteran Greg Tanner is found murdered in a Hudson University parking garage, Detectives Cyrus Lupo and Kevin Bernard connect the murder to law professor Kevin Franklin, an attorney who formerly worked for the Department of Justice. But when the case is brought to court, it seems Tanner may have been more affected by the war than his discharge stated. Lupo and Bernard find that the pieces start to fit when Franklin's memos from the Bush Administration are leaked. Meanwhile, Lieutenant Van Buren announces some very shocking news to her squad, concerning her health, and District Attorney Jack McCoy deals with the stress of winning the election.
435	2	"Just a Girl in the World"	M.T. Adler	Richard Sweren & Christopher Ambrose	October 2, 2009	20002	6.79
After crime scene unit investigator Daisy Chao is found murdered in her apartment, Detectives Lupo and Bernard suspect her fiance, Jim Anderson, may not be telling the whole truth about his involvement with the murder. When young journalist Emma Kim is attacked by a cab driver, DNA found at both crime scenes seems to implicate the same man for the attacks. Lupo becomes personally involved with Emma, raising serious ethical questions and jeopardizing both the case and his career. Note: Inspired by the con-artist known as the hipster grifter.
436	3	"Great Satan"	Michael Dinner	Ed Zuckerman & Luke Schelhaas	October 9, 2009	20003	7.22
When an aspiring musician is shot while attempting to go through a trash can, Detectives Lupo and Bernard find a bag full of cash, leading them to a slew of suspects, including Don Sorenson. Sorenson confesses to shooting the musician when it is revealed that his daughter is thought kidnapped, but the clues don't seem to match up when his daughter Jill appears back at home after losing her cell phone. Using the stolen cell phone as a guide, the detectives link the case with a bigger terrorist scheme, which could put lives in danger. Meanwhile, Lt. Van Buren begins to seek treatment for her cancer.
437	4	"Reality Bites"	Constantine Makris	Ed Zuckerman & Luke Schelhaas	October 16, 2009	20004	7.73
When Larry Johnson drives home from picking up his adopted, physically disabled children from school, he discovers his wife's dead body on the floor of their home. Detectives Lupo and Bernard question Vaughn, who explains that he and his wife had adopted a child with special needs and felt it was their calling, so they adopted nine more children. While the detectives question the children for suspects and a motive, they uncover an affair and an offer for the Vaughn family to appear in a reality show, causing tension in the household and with another family, whose mother Belinda Alvarez has strong ambitions to be on the reality show.
438	5	"Dignity"	Jim McKay	Richard Sweren & Julie Martin	October 23, 2009	20005	7.24
When Doctor Walter Benning is killed in church, Detectives Lupo and Kevin Bernard arrive at the scene and are informed a white male was seen fleeing in a dark sedan. The minister tells the detectives that Dr. Benning was a late-term abortion doctor and had been shot at before and threatened many times, and his wife, Phyllis Benning, is convinced it is an anti-abortion zealot who is responsible. While the detectives scan the several protester suspects, Lt. Van Buren gets more bad news and ADA Rubirosa faces a moral dilemma, causing tension among the team. Note: Inspired by the murder of George Tiller.
439	6	"Human Flesh Search Engine"	Darnell Martin	Ed Zuckerman & Matthew McGough	October 30, 2009	20006	7.07
When Sid Maxwell, owner of a fashion company, is found dead, Detectives Lupo and Bernard assume asphyxia. But when fashion photographer Terry Clark leads the detectives to an alarming discovery of Maxwell's true identity, they uncover a suspicious website with threatening web posts. Executive ADA Cutter takes on the operator of the website, Jim Leary, who is dedicated to righting social wrongs, after a delusional woman used information gathered on the website to kill Maxwell. But as the owner of the website is charged and put on trial, he uses his defense to go after Detective Bernard, uncovering a deep secret that he never wanted to be known to anyone. Cast: Final appearance of Carolyn McCormick as Dr. Elizabeth Olivet in the original Law & Order. First appearance of Ernie Hudson as Frank Gibson, Lt. Van Buren's boyfriend.
440	7	"Boy Gone Astray"	Rose Troche	S : René Balcer; S/T : Keith Eisner	November 6, 2009	20007	7.98
When a young woman Nina Wilsher is found dead in her apartment, a few tell-tale signs quickly lead Detectives Lupo and Bernard to believe that the killer was not after her wealth. After finding suitcases filled with money and drugs in one of the victim's apartments, the detectives watch a security video from her lobby. The video exposes two potential suspects, leading the detectives to a drug cartel. ADA Rubirosa winds up getting a personal stake in the case as she tries her best to help Rafa Alvarez, a young man who involuntarily got pulled into the cartel, testify against the drug lord, who has a rich and powerful defense attorney, who has crossed paths with Rubirosa before, Marcus Woll.
441	8	"Doped"	Mario Van Peebles	Richard Sweren & Christopher Ambrose	November 6, 2009	20008	8.29
A deadly drunk-driving car accident brings Detectives Lupo and Bernard to the scene when a suspicious nasal spray is found. After the medical examiner realizes the nasal spray is a powerful anesthetic that could easily disorient its user, the detectives learn that the victim was about to blow the whistle on the pharmaceutical company she worked for, causing the detectives to become suspicious of her boss, Zach Marshall.
442	9	"For the Defense"	William Klayer	Ed Zuckerman & Luke Schelhaas	November 13, 2009	20009	7.42
After a key witness Maggie Hayes for a murder trial is found dead outside her hotel room, Detectives Lupo and Bernard become involved in a spiraling case that unravels into an intricate conspiracy, leaving additional witnesses' lives in danger and ADA Rubirosa in the crossfire. Black market dealings, affairs and drug cartels intertwine to expose the risk of taking the stand as a witness when corrupt officials control the court, EADA Cutter does his best to get down to the truth in court, putting his partnership with Rubirosa on ice, especially after learning about Rubirosa's past with dirty prosecutor-turned-defense attorney, Marcus Woll.
443	10	"Shotgun"	Roger Young	Richard Sweren & Julie Martin	November 20, 2009	20010	7.52
When an elderly man, Stan Harkavy, a small businessman in Spanish Harlem, defends his shop from an armed robbery, Detectives Bernard and Lupo suspect that this incident could have been an inside job. However, the investigation later discovers that there are holes in his story; they learn that the mugging might have been a scare tactic for a shakedown, and that Mr. Harkavy's shooting may not have been a case of self-defense.
444	11	"Fed"	Alex Chapple	S : René Balcer; S/T : Keith Eisner	December 11, 2009	20011	8.81
As election day rapidly approaches, Detectives Lupo and Bernard discover the disfigured remains of James Landy a man with the word "FED" written across his bare chest. Missing a crucial piece of evidence, the detectives decide to retrace the steps of the victim, a campaign volunteer, to home in on the challenging investigation. After the victim's perplexing past emerges and the list of suspects multiplies, the detectives find themselves dealing with more than just dirty politics. They learn that the victim was secretly gathering incriminating information about the organization he worked for. Meanwhile, in the middle of the investigation, Lt. Van Buren gets a call from Rey Curtis, who is in town with some bad news.
445	12	"Blackmail"	Marc Levin	Ed Zuckerman & Matthew McGough	January 15, 2010	20012	7.21
When Lupo and Bernard find journalist Megan Kerik dead on an abandoned building site, the detectives learn of a relationship between the victim and daytime talk show host Vanessa Carville. Upon further investigation, the detectives encounter Carville in a meeting with DA Jack McCoy, and Carville admits to a series of workplace affairs and a blackmail threat, leaving the detectives suspicious of Carville and her co-workers.
446	13	"Steel-Eyed Death"	Michael Pressman	Richard Sweren & Christopher Ambrose & Julie Martin	March 1, 2010	20013	7.76
When a family of four is found murdered in their home, Detectives Lupo and Bernard discover that the deaths may be related to the deceased teenage daughter's troubled friend, Bonnie Jones. As Lupo and Bernard track down Bonnie, the detectives become aware of another suspect, Justin Sachs, who suffers from post-traumatic stress disorder, making the case more complicated when both suspects' mental states come into question. As the case is tried in court, EADA Mike Cutter is up against a famous defense attorney, Veronica Masters, who had a history with Detective Cyrus Lupo, who reveals a secret to his partner, Bernard.
447	14	"Boy on Fire"	Rose Troche	S : Ed Zuckerman; T : Luke Schelhaas; S/T : Matthew McGough	March 1, 2010	20014	7.76
When Lupo and Bernard come upon the burning body of Cesar Ramirez, a sixteen-year-old charter school student from a bad neighborhood, they begin to question his young mentee Moses, who was the last person to see him alive. After evidence leads the detectives to a shocking cell phone video of the crime being committed, they soon realize that the four people in the video may be in cahoots with an unexpected ally. The investigation leads the detectives to the high school principal, Martha Woodside, who has all of the right answers. With a shady educator, tampered alibis and jealous schoolboys all coming into play, the detectives discover that their case may be more than elementary, and until new evidence comes to light, there is no one that ADAs Cutter and Rubirosa can put on trial.
448	15	"Brilliant Disguise"	Alex Chapple	S : René Balcer; S/T : Keith Eisner	March 8, 2010	20015	5.21
After a young woman, Justine Stebbins, is found brutally murdered in a hotel and her body stashed away on a food service cart, evidence leads Detectives Lupo and Kevin Bernard to a young medical school student. When a crafty lawyer, Ray Backlund, becomes involved, the detectives realize that it is going to take more than superficial evidence to put the murderer behind bars. This quickly becomes a case of mind over matter.
449	16	"Innocence"	Fred Berner	Richard Sweren & Julie Martin	March 15, 2010	20016	6.95
Detectives Lupo and Bernard detain Cedric Stuber a man who is tried and found guilty of killing a gay man as a hate crime. Shortly after, one of Cutter's former law professors, Emily Ryan steps in with The Innocence Collective, determined to prove his innocence and reverse the verdict. Cutter soon discovers that Emily's overeager student assistant, Lisa Klein, may have crossed the line to get a testimony in her client's favor. Before long, personal relationships are threatened as the integrity of the entire trial is called into question. As a defense on for her client, Emily Ryan uses the status of EADA Cutter's law license to say that her client, among others, deserve new trials; Cutter races to figure out a way to keep a mistrial from occurring and letting the defendant walk away from a brutal hate crime.
450	17	"Four Cops Shot"	Jim McKay	Ed Zuckerman & Luke Schelhaas & Matthew McGough	March 22, 2010	20017	6.02
Lieutenant Anita Van Buren is told by her doctor Valerie Knight that she came off her radiation just fine and her hemoglobin levels are up. She's set to go back to her doctor in three months to see if the tumor has shrunk. Meanwhile, Detectives Lupo and Bernard are called to a scene where four police officers were shot and killed, at a local pizzeria. With a room full of witnesses, they have a sketchy description of the culprit but that's all. The case becomes even more confusing when they discover that the police officers may have known the shooter. The investigation quickly leads them to a drug cartel, a jealous husband, and a penitent judge who are all linked together. Tensions rise from both the homicide units, the DA's office, and even to the U.S. Attorney. Notes: Originally intended as the season/series finale episode, but due to the 2010 Tonight Show conflict; NBC ordered six more episodes to the season. Mentions the Season 6 episode "Aftershock".
451	18	"Brazil"	Jean de Segonzac	S : René Balcer; S/T : Keith Eisner	March 29, 2010	20018	6.01
When an environmental scientist, Dr. Oscar Silva, is poisoned during a global warming symposium, Detectives Bernard and Lupo initially suspect competitors from Dr. Silva's field of study. It is soon discovered that Dr. Silva is involved in a messy custody battle with his wife Dana's ex-husband, Phillip Shoemaker, and the focus of the investigation quickly shifts to the victim's family. Meanwhile, the case becomes personal for EADA Cutter as it stirs up unpleasant memories from his own past.
452	19	"Crashers"	Darnell Martin	Richard Sweren & Christopher Ambrose & Julie Martin	May 3, 2010	20019	6.18
When the body of young model Brenna Lane is found burning in an alley, Detectives Lupo and Bernard search for her killer. With no witnesses, the detectives must retrace the victim's last steps to get insight into her final days before her death. They quickly discover that just before her death, Brenna crashed an upscale political event, hosted by Senator Bryce Peterson and his wife Camille. As secrets unfold, Lupo and Bernard realize that they must untangle an intricate web of lies to obtain the truth about Brenna Lane's murder. Note: This is the first episode of the series in which Anita Van Buren, who plays S. Epatha Merkerson, does not wear a wig.
453	20	"The Taxman Cometh"	Fred Berner	S : Ed Zuckerman; S/T : William N. Fordes	May 10, 2010	20020	6.22
Lupo and Bernard are called in to investigate the death of a young heiress, Annie Douglas, who died of an apparent drug overdose. The detectives begin to suspect her cousin, Randy Colwyn, whose inheritance was increased due to Annie's death. As the investigation continues, Annie's greedy relatives reveal another recent loss in the group. The case becomes more than a family matter as an experimental cancer clinic, fraudulent adoptions and unborn children are tied into the case.
454	21	"Immortal"	Jim McKay	Richard Sweren & Julie Martin	May 17, 2010	20021	6.12
When Jerome Turner dies of stab wounds upon arrival at a hospital, Lupo and Bernard are called in to investigate his stabbing. They soon discover that, unknown to everyone, Turner was leading a double life. Family tensions escalate as the detectives begin to unravel secrets of an exploited family (resembling the case of Henrietta Lacks). In search for the truth, EADA Cutter crosses a line with Lt. Van Buren during trial.
455	22	"Love Eternal"	William Klayer	Ed Zuckerman	May 17, 2010	20022	6.12
When a television crew from a style show goes in search of a fashion victim, Marielle Di Napoli, they find a murder victim instead. As Detectives Lupo and Bernard investigate this unusual crime, they begin to suspect the victim's wife, who has a violent and peculiar past. The case is further complicated when detectives discover the truth behind the victim's financial situation: they learn that the victim may have backed out of a conspiracy with fellow husbands to hide assets from their wives until their divorces.
456	23	"Rubber Room"	René Balcer	René Balcer	May 24, 2010	20023	7.84
When Lieutenant Van Buren discovers a blog site featuring video of an alarming amount of explosives, Detectives Lupo and Bernard race against time to find the anonymous blogger before plans to blow up a school are put into action. The Department of Education's refusal to take the threat seriously and resistance from the teachers' union further complicate the investigation. Fortunately, an administrative assistant at the teachers' union, Alicia, gives the detectives a tip to lead them in the right direction. Meanwhile, Lieutenant Van Buren struggles to keep her personal issues from becoming public and due to the ignorance of the people possibly revolving around the blogger's terrorist act, they push District Attorney McCoy's buttons.
