= Anita Van Buren =

Law & Order character

- Law & Order character
- First appearance: "Sweeps"
- Last appearance: "Rubber Room"
- Portrayed by: S. Epatha Merkerson

In-universe information
- Family: Donald Van Buren (ex-husband); Ric Van Buren (son); Stefan Van Buren (son); Frank Gibson (fiancée); Unnamed sister
- Seasons: 4, 5, 6, 7, 8, 9, 10, 11, 12, 13, 14, 15, 16, 17, 18, 19, 20

Anita Van Buren is a fictional character on NBC's long-running police procedural and legal drama television series Law & Order, portrayed by S. Epatha Merkerson. The character of Van Buren was an "authoritative lieutenant" in the New York Police Department, who supervised teams of detectives who worked out in the field, and originally served as "commander of the 27th Precinct Detective Squad." The fictional Van Buren achieved the rank of NYPD lieutenant before any actual policewoman in New York did so, creating a "dissonance" with reality. Van Buren appeared in 390 episodes of Law & Order. When she crossed the 300-episode mark in 2008, Lt. Van Buren became the longest-running African-American character in television history.

In 1997, it was noted that "Van Buren was one of the first and is still one of the few female African-American characters in network television to hold a position of power standing over the desks of white professional men telling them how to do their jobs." The Associated Press once described Van Buren as a character with typically "limited screen time...whose practical function is to point her detectives in the story's next direction." After many years on the procedural drama, Merkerson was "rewarded with a personal crisis for her character—a life-threatening bout with cervical cancer—that gave her some fine, if fleeting, opportunities to show Van Buren's rarely glimpsed vulnerability." Van Buren's role in the franchise is considered a precursor to Olivia Benson's centrality in the SVU series.

By episode count, she was the longest-running character on the original show during its original run; Jack McCoy (Sam Waterston) surpassed her during its revival. Van Buren appeared in 392 episodes within the franchise (390 of Law & Order, the Law & Order: Criminal Intent episode "Badge" and the Law & Order: Trial by Jury episode "Skeleton") and Exiled: A Law & Order Movie, and is the fifth longest-running regular character in the Law & Order franchise, behind Olivia Benson (Mariska Hargitay), Fin Tutuola (Ice-T), McCoy, and Donald Cragen (Dann Florek), and the sixth longest-running character in the Law & Order universe, behind Benson (478 episodes in Law & Order: Special Victims Unit), Tutuola (456 episodes in SVU), McCoy (408 episodes in the universe, including two in Homicide: Life on the Street), Cragen (400 episodes in the franchise), and John Munch (Richard Belzer) (452 episodes in the universe, including 122 in Homicide: Life on the Street).

TV critics Alan Sepinwall and Matt Zoller Seitz called the season-five Law & Order character lineup (featuring Van Buren, McCoy, Mike Logan, Lennie Briscoe, Claire Kincaid and Adam Schiff) the single-best character combination in the Law & Order universe, dubbing them "the '27 Yankees of L&O casts, featuring not only Hall of Famers at every position but the very best example of each respective role in the franchise's history." A textbook on management of state and municipal police departments described Anita Van Buren as a "good example of an operational supervisor as a strong leader...Nothing seems to get by her. When [detectives] cross the line of legality, she steps in to put them in their place. The operational supervisor must know their subordinates well; they must be present not only in spirit but in body and mind."

== Character history ==
Van Buren joins the cast in the 1993 episode "Sweeps", succeeding Capt. Don Cragen (Dann Florek) as commander of the 27th Precinct Detective Squad after Cragen transfers to the Anti-Corruption Task Force. Throughout her run on the show, she oversees the work of detectives such as Lennie Briscoe (Jerry Orbach), Mike Logan (Chris Noth), Tony Profaci (John Fiero), Rey Curtis (Benjamin Bratt), Sammy Kurtz (Paul Guilfoyle), Morris LaMotte (Larry Clarke), Joe Cormack (Joe Forbrich), Ed Green (Jesse L. Martin), Joe Fontana (Dennis Farina), Nick Falco (Michael Imperioli), Nina Cassady (Milena Govich), Cyrus Lupo (Jeremy Sisto), and Kevin Bernard (Anthony Anderson).

Van Buren is known for her toughness, but she often pays a price for it. In one episode she shoots and wounds a would-be mugger (Omar Scroggins) who attacks her at an ATM, and kills the mugger's partner, who turned out to be a mentally handicapped teenager. She is investigated, and absolved, by the Internal Affairs Bureau. The District Attorney brings her case to the grand jury, but they choose to not indict her. Later, the mugger is charged with the murder and Van Buren testifies at the trial. Due to this, Lennie Briscoe later tells Rey Curtis that “she hates the hell out of going to court.” In another, she nearly loses her job when she sues the NYPD for promoting a white woman with less seniority ahead of her. Her lawsuit becomes such an issue of contention within the department that the Chief of Detectives tells her she will have to resign to get her squad the resources it needs to apprehend a child rapist. A judge eventually dismisses her discrimination suit.

During a murder case, Van Buren learns that the case that led to her promotion to lieutenant was tainted by a dishonest fingerprint examiner's report. The expert, a friend of Van Buren's, had been falsifying various other reports and is tried for her actions, saying that she was just doing what Van Buren wanted. No action is taken against Van Buren, but the scandal continues to haunt her.

In season 17, she is forced to accept Nina Cassady as the replacement for Det. Joe Fontana upon his retirement. Van Buren believes that Cassady is too inexperienced to be a homicide detective, creating a risk to her partner, Ed Green. Van Buren had a "hand-picked" replacement for Fontana who was much more experienced than Cassady. She eventually learns to tolerate (and perhaps accept) Cassady as a member of her squad. However, this acceptance does not seem to last long; in the seventeenth season finale "The Family Hour", Van Buren berates the detective for her inability to keep her temper in check and suggests that Cassady has no future in the 27th Squad.

She was succeeded as lieutenant of the 27th Precinct by Kate Dixon, when Season 21 premiered in 2022.

== Personal life ==
Van Buren was born at some point after 1952. A graduate of John Jay College, Van Buren was married to Donald (Charles Dumas), who owns a hardware store. They divorce after he cheated on her. They have two sons, Stefan, who is the elder, and Ric, who was diagnosed with scoliosis at the age of six. It is revealed that she spent five years as a patrol officer and three years in undercover narcotics. Further revelations are that she enjoys the poet Langston Hughes, and that she is left-handed. She had a sister who was greatly upset by the fact that she could not have children. She is opposed to the Iraq War and disapproves of hunting.

Her father was wounded in Wasu, Korea, during the Korean War in 1952. He spent time at Tulsa VA Hospital in Oklahoma and his wife later claimed that he would have died if it had not been for the excellent care that he received from the medical staff. He had died by 2007. Her detectives have affectionately addressed her by two shortened versions of her rank: "L.T." (used by Rey Curtis, Cyrus Lupo, and Kevin Bernard) and "Lieu" (used by Lennie Briscoe, Ed Green, and also Cyrus Lupo).

=== Cancer storyline ===
In season 20, Van Buren sees an OB/GYN and is diagnosed with Stage II cervical cancer, caused by the sexually transmitted human papillomavirus (HPV)—which she contracted from Donald, who had been cheating on her. She had not been married to him for at least 5 years. Just before her diagnosis, she began dating a man named Frank (Ernie Hudson). Due to the chemotherapy, she loses her hair and begins wearing a wig. She is so dedicated to her job that she refuses to use medical marijuana because, at the time, it is illegal; however, she starts using it after the Chief of Detectives, a testicular cancer survivor, says he will look the other way if she keeps it discreet. As the season goes on, her treatment is apparently not progressing well and she is becoming increasingly worried about her chances of survival. However, in the final episode of the season (and ultimately the series, at the time), "Rubber Room", her health appears to have improved: she receives a call from her doctor, looks back at her colleagues and whispers "Thank you...Thank you" to herself. The series ends with a fundraising party that her colleagues organized in order to help her pay for the expensive treatment. On the same occasion, it is revealed that she and Frank are engaged.

== Work history ==
Time period	Senior Detective	Junior Detective
1993–1995	Lennie Briscoe	Mike Logan
1995–1999	Lennie Briscoe	Rey Curtis
1999–2004	Lennie Briscoe	Ed Green
2004–2006	Joe Fontana	Ed Green
2005	Joe Fontana	Ed Green
2005	Joe Fontana	Nick Falco
2005	Joe Fontana	Ed Green
2006–2007	Ed Green	Nina Cassady
2008	Ed Green	Cyrus Lupo
2008–2010	Cyrus Lupo	Kevin Bernard

== Awards and decorations ==
The following are the medals and service awards worn by Lieutenant Van Buren, as seen in "Gunplay" (season 15, episode 5).

American Flag Breast Bar
World Trade Center Breast Bar
NYPD Meritorious Police Duty
NYPD Excellent Police Duty

== Credits ==
Seasons	Years	Episodes																							
Seasons	Years	1	2	3	4	5	6	7	8	9	10	11	12	13	14	15	16	17	18	19	20	21	22	23	24
4	1993–94																								
5	1994–95																								
6	1995–96																								
7	1996–97																								
8	1997–98																								
9	1998–99																								
10	1999-2000																								
11	2000–01																								
12	2001–02																								
13	2002–03																								
14	2003–04																								
15	2004–05																								
16	2005–06																								
17	2006–07																								
18	2008																								
19	2008–09																								
20	2009-10																								
Seasons	Years	1	2	3	4	5	6	7	8	9	10	11	12	13	14	15	16	17	18	19	20	21	22	23	24
Seasons	Years	Episodes																							

Regular cast

×	Regular cast + no appearance

Recurring cast

No credit + no appearance
