= Law & Order season 18 =

Season of American television series

Law & Order
- Season 18
- Season 18 U.S. DVD cover
- Starring: Jesse L. Martin; Jeremy Sisto; S. Epatha Merkerson; Linus Roache; Alana de la Garza; Sam Waterston; Anthony Anderson
- No. of episodes: 18

Release
- Original network: NBC
- Original release: January 2 – May 21, 2008

Season chronology
- ← Previous; Season 17 Next → Season 19

The eighteenth season of Law & Order premiered with a two part episode on NBC on January 2, 2008, and concluded on May 21, 2008. This was the final season to feature Jesse L. Martin, as he departs the series in episode 14 and is replaced in the cast by Anthony Anderson.

== Production ==
On May 13, 2007, NBC renewed Law & Order for an 18th season of 22 episodes as part of a deal made by series creator Dick Wolf and NBC. Though the series was originally scheduled to air on Sundays as a midseason replacement for NBC Sunday Night Football, TV Guide reported on December 4, 2007, that Law & Order would debut instead on Wednesday, January 2, 2008.

René Balcer, who had developed and produced spinoff Law & Order: Criminal Intent, returned to Law & Order as executive producer. Production of season 18 was interrupted by the 2007 Writers Guild of America strike. When Balcer and the rest of the writing staff participated in the work stoppage, the mid-season delay meant that the season only had eighteen episodes instead of the scheduled twenty-two.

== Cast and crew changes ==
In May 2007, cast member Fred Thompson departed the series to return to politics, with reports saying he would seek the Republican nomination for the 2008 U.S. presidential election. His character, District Attorney Arthur Branch, was replaced in that function by Sam Waterston's Jack McCoy, with McCoy being promoted to Branch's vacant seat after serving as Executive Assistant District Attorney since the resignation of his predecessor Benjamin Stone. Since this move required that a new character be added to the series, the writers created the role of EADA Michael Cutter and British actor Linus Roache was brought in to portray him.

Because of the equal-time rule, which requires that broadcasters treat legally qualified political candidates equally in regard to air time, NBC announced in July 2007 that it would not broadcast any episode of Law & Order in which Thompson appeared after September 1. Thompson officially declared his intention to seek nomination on September 5, 2007, when he appeared on The Tonight Show with Jay Leno.

Milena Govich, who played Detective Nina Cassady, also did not return to the series after joining the cast one year earlier following the departure of Dennis Farina (Joe Fontana). She was replaced by Jeremy Sisto, who had guest starred as a defense attorney in the 17th season finale, as Detective Ed Green's new partner Cyrus Lupo.

Rounding out the list of departures was Jesse L. Martin, who had portrayed Det. Ed Green since 1999. Martin, who was scheduled to appear in only 13 episodes this season, announced the move in February 2008 and made his final appearance in "Burn Card". Anthony Anderson, who made his debut as Detective Kevin Bernard in the same episode, was then added to the cast.

== Cast ==
=== Main ===
- Jesse L. Martin as Senior Detective Ed Green (Episodes 1–14)
- Jeremy Sisto as Junior / Senior Detective Cyrus Lupo
- S. Epatha Merkerson as Lieutenant Anita Van Buren
- Linus Roache as Executive Assistant District Attorney Michael Cutter
- Alana de la Garza as Assistant District Attorney Connie Rubirosa
- Sam Waterston as Interim District Attorney Jack McCoy
- Anthony Anderson as Junior Detective Kevin Bernard (Episodes 15–18)

=== Recurring ===
- Carolyn McCormick as Dr. Elizabeth Olivet
- Leslie Hendrix as M.E. Dr. Elizabeth Rodgers

=== Guest ===
- David Zayas as Detective Justin Cabrera
- John Doman as Jim Gilles
- Ruben Santiago-Hudson as Defense Attorney Winters

== Episodes ==
No. overall	No. in season	Title	Directed by	Written by	Original release date	Prod. code	U.S. viewers (millions)
394	1	"Called Home"	Allen Coulter	René Balcer	January 2, 2008	18001	13.46
Det. Cyrus Lupo returns to New York after serving four years abroad in the Intelligence division after learning his brother Thomas Lupo committed suicide. Lupo and Green reluctantly partner up to investigate another suicide committed the same way and soon find a suspect in a parolee known as "Dr. Death". Cast: First appearances of Jeremy Sisto as Detective Cyrus Lupo, and Linus Roache as Executive Assistant District Attorney Michael Cutter.
395	2	"Darkness"	Michael Dinner	William N. Fordes & David Slack	January 2, 2008	18006	13.46
Green and Lupo investigate a kidnapping that happened during a citywide blackout; a housekeeper is slain and a mother and daughter are kidnapped. The evidence that links all the kidnappers is the father and husband of the kidnap victims. When they search the kidnappers' hideout, they find preparations which implies that the kidnappers knew that the blackout was coming. Cutter must convince the man to testify after he has lied about a search warrant to save the man's daughter, or else the kidnappers will all go free. Issues of a warrantless search arise. Note: Courtroom scenes revolve around questions of Enron-like manipulation of energy.
396	3	"Misbegotten"	Michael Watkins	David Wilcox & Stephanie Sengupta	January 9, 2008	18002	11.02
Green and Lupo investigate after a package explodes at a scientific research lab, resulting in the injury of Lori Emerson a pregnant security guard. The investigation soon turns to the scientist's latest experiments. Note: Inspired by the concept of the gay gene.
397	4	"Bottomless"	Alex Chapple	Ed Zuckerman	January 16, 2008	18004	11.59
The investigation into a pair of missing pants leads to the murder of Lily Yee a young lawyer. Green and Lupo soon turn their suspicions to a businessman who works for a shady multinational corporation called SavingsMart. Note: Inspired by Roy Pearson's 54 million dollar pants lawsuit, by quality-control issues with goods from China, and by ethics enforcement at Wal-Mart.
398	5	"Driven"	Alan Taylor	Richard Sweren & Gina Gionfriddo	January 23, 2008	18009	10.35
Lupo and Green investigate after David Kendall a white teenager and Tanya Anderson a young black girl are shot and killed in a local neighborhood. The investigation stalls when no one is willing to talk, but the detectives later learn that the victim had earlier had an altercation with someone in the neighborhood that led to a surprising altercation later that evening.
399	6	"Political Animal"	Jean de Segonzac	Ed Zuckerman & David Slack	January 30, 2008	18011	11.10
A triple homicide has ties to a politician, but he may be just the first step toward the truth and a killer who will take desperate measures to keep his freedom.
400	7	"Quit Claim"	Jim McKay	William N. Fordes & David Wilcox	February 6, 2008	18010	10.06
A hit-and-run investigation leads back to a title company, but Green, Rubirosa and Lupo's undercover work takes a surprising twist that pits McCoy against the U.S. Attorney's office.
401	8	"Illegal"	Constantine Makris	William N. Fordes & David Slack	February 13, 2008	18003	10.23
A riot at an immigration rally ends in murder, and the political climate causes McCoy to assign a special prosecutor increasing tensions at the office.: references to Law & Order season 9 2-part Episode "Refugee", and Law & Order season 10 Episode "Gunshow"
402	9	"Executioner"	Constantine Makris	Richard Sweren & Gina Gionfriddo	February 20, 2008	18012	10.86
A case of mistaken identity leads Green and Lupo to suspect that a murdered doctor may have been in the wrong place at the wrong time.
403	10	"Tango"	Dean White	Stephanie Sengupta	February 27, 2008	18013	11.42
A high school party turns tragic when teenager Ann-Marie Liscombe is found dead, and the detectives end up playing games with the two leading suspects to find out the real story. Unfortunately, unwanted attention from a juror for ADA Rubirosa may disrupt the trial. Guest starring: Pedro Pascal as Tito Cabassa.
404	11	"Betrayal"	Marc Levin	Richard Sweren & Gina Gionfriddo	March 5, 2008	18005	9.63
The murder of Isaac Waxman, a psychiatrist, focuses the suspect list to his clients and wife Katherine, and the defense of the murderer will challenge the D.A.'s office to somehow show the jury that a bad childhood is not a justification for crime. Guest starring: John Shea (cameo) as Isaac Waxman, and Moira Kelly as Katherine Donovan Waxman.
405	12	"Submission"	Constantine Makris	Ed Zuckerman	March 12, 2008	18007	11.85
When the police shut down a dog-fighting ring, the investigation becomes a murder case after a woman's finger is found inside one of the dogs; things get more complicated as the case deepens, and the interest of pushy reporter Dawn Talley is sparked. Guest starring: Lara Flynn Boyle as Dawn Talley.
406	13	"Angelgrove"	Darnell Martin	David Wilcox & Stephanie Sengupta	March 19, 2008	18008	10.49
A recorded conversation has Lupo and Green delving into the personal and family life of murdered art dealer Audrey Lortell, suspected of connections to terrorist activity. Later investigation leads to her fanatical Christian teenage son Jason Lortell and his pastor Pastor Hensley. Guest starring: Will Denton as Jason Lortell, Sean Astin and Pastor Hensley.
407	14	"Burn Card"	Mario Van Peebles	Ed Zuckerman & David Wilcox	April 23, 2008	18014	12.75
Internal Affairs takes a special interest in Ed after he shoots a gambler who may be connected to a current case. The investigation turns up a part of his past he's taken pains to conceal. At the end, Green leaves the 27th Precinct even though all charges against him are dropped and he is cleared. Cast: Last appearance of Jesse L. Martin as Detective Ed Green. First appearance of Anthony Anderson as Internal Affairs Detective Kevin Bernard, who becomes the Junior Detective in the next episode, with Detective Cyrus Lupo then promoted to Senior Detective.
408	15	"Bogeyman"	Tim Hunter	S : Gina Gionfriddo; S/T : Richard Sweren	April 30, 2008	18015	9.65
A novelist's apparent suicide changes to a murder investigation. The suspects include a cultist and her husband. Cutter's case is jeopardized by the defense attorney's indirect juror tampering tactics of scaring the jurors.
409	16	"Strike"	Marisol Torres	William N. Fordes & David Slack	May 7, 2008	18016	8.85
A legal aid strike ends in the death of a paralegal, and the investigation leads to a greenskeeper who proclaims his innocence, again. The case takes an even stranger twist when Rubirosa is pitted against Cutter because of the strike that started it all.
410	17	"Personae Non Gratae"	John Coles	Stephanie Sengupta & Matthew McGough	May 14, 2008	18017	8.46
An online romance may be at the heart of a mechanic's murder, but Detectives Lupo and Bernard must unravel some truly bizarre developments before the full story is known. Guest starring: Melissa Leo as Donna Chaponis, first of four appearances by Tom Everett Scott as NY Governor Donald Shalvoy
411	18	"Excalibur"	Jim McKay	René Balcer & Ed Zuckerman	May 21, 2008	18018	8.57
A jeweler's murder may have ties to a prostitution ring. Once the case goes to trial, D.A. McCoy's job is on the line as favors are called in.
