= Connie Rubirosa =

Law & Order character

- Law & Order character
- First appearance: "Fame" (L&O) "Silver Lake" (LA) "Jersey Breakdown" (SVU)
- Last appearance: "Rubber Room" (L&O) "Angel's Knoll" (LA)
- Portrayed by: Alana de la Garza

In-universe information
- Seasons: L&O: 17, 18, 19, 20; LA: 1 SVU: 15

Consuela "Connie" Rubirosa is a fictional character, portrayed by Alana de la Garza, who joined the cast of long-running NBC drama series Law & Order during the 17th-season premiere episode "Fame". She is the only second-chair assistant district attorney (ADA) of Law & Order to have appeared in four complete seasons and the last ADA on the show before its eventual cancellation in 2010. She later appeared on Law & Order: LA as a series regular until the show's cancellation in May 2011. In January 2014, she appeared on Law & Order: Special Victims Unit, in which she has become an assistant U.S. attorney in the Southern District of New York.

== Character overview ==
=== Career history ===
After graduating Swarthmore College and spending a year working as a kindergarten teacher, Rubirosa joined the Manhattan District Attorney's office in 2004. Shortly thereafter, Rubirosa had a brief sexual relationship with her supervisor, Marcus Woll. She is promoted to assistant district attorney in 2007 under District Attorney Arthur Branch, and second-chairs for Executive Assistant District Attorney Jack McCoy. With McCoy's election to district attorney (as of the 18th season), Rubirosa is assigned to newly promoted Executive Assistant District Attorney Michael Cutter. During the early months of this transition, she is sometimes an unwilling mediator when her two superiors have disagreements regarding law.

After leaving the Manhattan District Attorney's Office, Rubirosa goes on to serve as a deputy district attorney in Los Angeles, following the resignations of Evelyn Price and Lauren Stanton. In this capacity, she works alongside Joe Dekker.

Rubirosa returned to the Law & Order franchise as a federal prosecutor in the Law & Order: Special Victims Unit season-15 episode "Jersey Breakdown". In this episode, which aired on January 22, 2014, she heads a joint task force on underaged sex trafficking.

=== Family ===
She has stated that her father, a doctor, was a Spanish immigrant whose medical degree was not recognized in the United States and who thus had to work as a nurse for 10 years. Later in the case, she passionately opposes a legal strategy proposed by McCoy that would have detrimentally affected other illegal immigrants who worked for the same contractor, but were not part of the crime. She has also told McCoy that she had a sister who had previously been in an abusive relationship. She also has a brother. Her brother is married and has at least two children. His wife almost miscarries their first child in or before 2001. Her mother is Mexican, as she was a descendant of Juan Cortina. Her parents divorced and her mother eventually remarried. Her stepfather died in 2007. In 2011, she moved to Los Angeles to take care of her mother, who had suffered a stroke.

=== Personality ===
Rubirosa is a strong advocate of women's rights. In one episode, she says she disagrees with the politics of a conservative author who made "Ann Coulter look like Mary Poppins". In another, however, she refuses to give credit to a female defense attorney's unjustified feminist trial strategy. During one case, Rubirosa learns damaging information about a murdered abortion doctor's murder of a newborn, albeit at the clear informed permission of the mother of a baby with birth defects severe enough to guarantee death in hours. Although her superiors order her to delay reporting it to the medical board as irrelevant evidence of a deceased doctor until after the trial, Rubirosa is so moved by the testimony, and concerned by the apparent breach of professional ethics of not immediately informing the defense of the facts, that she defied her instructions. Although Rubirosa requests a transfer to the white-collar crime section for this moral conflict, McCoy, deciding that the moral complexities involved in the case and the larger issues needed more flexibility from everyone, orders Cutter and her to resolve their differences.

Rubirosa has a strong maternal instinct. She has always wanted to have a child, but is appalled at the casual treatment of children as "fashion" by affluent celebrities. She is disgusted by the defendant in one episode, a wealthy actress who allowed a baby to die due to negligence, and then got a "replacement baby". She is particularly outraged by the defendant's claim that the nanny was responsible for the child's death, and that she did not recognize that the babies had been switched.

Her physical attractiveness sometimes becomes an issue during cases. During one trial, a juror flirts with her after the trial has adjourned for the day. Shocked, she quickly insists that such communication is inappropriate and must stop. When she learns that Cutter was aware of the juror's feelings toward her and that Cutter's recommendation was based on these feelings, she is angry at him, feeling that he had "pimped [her] out to the jury".

In the episode "Strike", legal aid is on strike and Rubirosa is forced to become the defendant's defense attorney. She proves quite capable, and shows her clear belief in "zealously representing [her] client". Besides being Cutter's opponent throughout the trial, she antagonizes Detective Kevin Bernard in court. She even uses dubious means to suppress incriminating evidence, although Cutter discovers it, anyway. Later, she comes to believe her client is guilty, of both this murder and another for which he will soon be officially pardoned. Although she agonizes about violating attorney–client privilege, she decides to give him an ultimatum: take a plea bargain or risk an unfavorable jury verdict. The choice is also influenced by what Rubirosa sees as repeated dishonesty on his part, and she ultimately comments to McCoy that she hopes her action was fair, and not biased by her view that he was guilty. McCoy assures her that he is certain her actions were fair and legal.

She supports the use of post-9/11 terrorism laws for purposes beyond their original intent, demonstrated when she comes up with the idea of charging the perpetrators of a park fight with committing a terrorist act after several innocent bystanders are killed in the fray.

She has a great deal of respect for McCoy, and is slightly protective of him, to the point that Cutter and she have an agreement in which he is not allowed to criticize McCoy in front of her.

She has revealed her dedication to her job on more than one occasion. When a death threat is made against her while she is investigating a drug cartel, she is adamant about remaining on the case. In the end, the lead witness in the case backs out, ending the trial and the threat to her life. In another, she is a witness in a brutal shooting against a woman who is supposed to testify in court. Although Cutter gives her the opportunity to stop working on the case, she stays on, determined to do her job no matter what.

In the aforementioned episode, she names herself as a co-conspirator in a murder charge, to ensure that they can charge the defendant with conspiracy to commit murder. No charges are pressed against her, but even Cutter is shocked by her actions, while also proud of her.

Rubirosa is aware that Cutter has romantic feelings for her, but her own feelings on the matter are left ambiguous.

When she was in high school, she and her friends started a rumor which almost got the vice principal fired.

Alana de la Garza, who portrays Connie Rubirosa, was pregnant in 2010. Although Rubirosa was initially suggested to become pregnant in the series, as well, the subsequent cancellation of the show after 20 seasons rendered the matter moot.

== Reception ==
Ken Tucker wrote, "De La Garza is, per the show's distaff tradition, obliged to have Rubirosa scissor her legs around the DA's office. But unlike past office trinkets like Angie Harmon (1998–2001) or Elisabeth Röhm (2001–2005), De La Garza also draws your attention to her sarcastically raised eyebrow when she looks at the clashing McCoy and Cutter as if to say, 'Boys, boys — is that a legal brief in your briefs, or are you just glad to see each other?’"

John Freeman Gill of The New York Times writes that "Law & Order has been around so long that the datebook in the office of the prosecutor played by Sam Waterston is embossed with the year 1995. But one new ingredient in the show this season, the casting of Alana De La Garza as its first Hispanic assistant district attorney, helped give the "Melting Pot" story both nuance and passion."

Matt Roush of TV Guide wrote, "Tonight, in another strong episode, it's De La Garza's turn to shine, and she makes the most of it, proving herself a worthy successor to Jill Hennessy and Angie Harmon, my previous favorites in this often-thankless role. She is tough and aggressive, but always sympathetic, as she is forced to go up against her colleague Cutter in court as a temporary (and very reluctant) defense attorney, called into action because the Legal Aid lawyers are all on strike."

== Credits ==
De la Garza has been credited in 85 episodes of Law & Order, eight episodes of Law & Order: LA, and one episode of Law & Order: Special Victims Unit, a total of 94 episodes. Her 85 episodes as an ADA makes her tied for the fifth-longest serving ADA in the Law & Order franchise history with Serena Southerlyn, surpassed by Rafael Barba (SVU), Alexandra Cabot (SVU), Ron Carver (CI), and Casey Novak (SVU).

Seasons	Years	Episodes																						
Seasons	Years	1	2	3	4	5	6	7	8	9	10	11	12	13	14	15	16	17	18	19	20	21	22	23
17	2006–07																							
18	2007–08																							
19	2008–09																							
20	2009–10																							
1 (LOLA)	2011																							
15 (SVU)	2014																							
Seasons	Years	1	2	3	4	5	6	7	8	9	10	11	12	13	14	15	16	17	18	19	20	21	22	23
Seasons	Years	Episodes																						

Regular cast

No credit + no appearance

No episode
