= Arthur Branch =

Law & Order character

Arthur Branch (District Attorney)
- Law & Order character
- First appearance: "American Jihad" (L&O) "Fallacy" (SVU) "The Abominable Showman" (TBJ)
- Last appearance: "The Family Hour" (L&O) "Gone" (SVU) "Eros in the Upper Eighties" (TBJ)
- Portrayed by: Fred Dalton Thompson

In-universe information
- Spouse: Lillian Branch
- Children: Bobby Branch
- Relatives: Unnamed grandson Maggie Branch (granddaughter); Andy (nephew)
- Seasons: L&O: 13, 14, 15, 16, 17; SVU: 4, 5, 6, 7 TBJ: 1

Arthur Branch is a fictional character on the TV crime drama Law & Order and one of its spinoffs, Law & Order: Trial by Jury. Branch has also appeared on Law & Order: Special Victims Unit, Law & Order: Criminal Intent, and Conviction. He appeared in 142 episodes of the various series in the franchise (116 episodes of Law & Order, 11 episodes of Law & Order: Special Victims Unit, one episode of Law & Order: Criminal Intent, all 13 episodes of Law & Order: Trial by Jury, and the pilot episode of Conviction).

Branch was portrayed by Fred Thompson, who started his acting career in 1985, and was a sitting U.S. Senator by the time Arthur Branch was introduced to the Law & Order franchise as the Manhattan District Attorney in the 2002 episode "American Jihad". In 2005, during his third season on Law & Order, his character appeared in the main cast of Trial by Jury, making him one of the few actors to be in the main cast on two TV series simultaneously as the same character. When Thompson began the role, his term in the Senate did not expire until several months after his first episode aired—thus making Thompson the first sitting U.S. Senator to portray someone other than himself on TV. Thompson was the only regular on Law & Order who was once a prosecutor in real life. He worked as an assistant United States Attorney from 1969 to 1972.

== Character background ==
Branch graduated from Yale University and Yale Law School. He was later a professor at the latter. He and his wife, Lillian, have lived in New York City since moving in the early 1980s from the state of Georgia. According to McCoy, Lillian "loves the smell of concrete", and would not allow Arthur to move from New York City back to Georgia. Arthur and Lillian have at least one child, a son named Bobby. They also have a grandson and a granddaughter named Maggie. He also has a nephew named Andy. He owns a Chevrolet and a Porsche. He speaks with a Southern accent and commonly uses colorful metaphors.

Branch is elected the Manhattan District Attorney in 2002, replacing Nora Lewin (Dianne Wiest). Prior to becoming the District Attorney, he was successful as a lawyer and became the head of his New York law firm. He says that he was elected DA because the people of Manhattan wanted to feel safe after the September 11 attacks. Along with Odafin Tutuola (Ice-T), he and Abbie Carmichael (Angie Harmon) are the only characters in the show known to be Republicans. Branch's administration is a sharp contrast to that of Lewin, as he supports the death penalty and does not believe in the existence of a constitutional right to privacy. He had written a book on the justice system and represented the Chinese government when he worked in private practice.

His legal and political conservatism often puts him in conflict with Jack McCoy (Sam Waterston), a relative center leftist, as well as his previous assistant DA Serena Southerlyn (Elisabeth Röhm), a liberal idealist. He has few quarrels with Alexandra Borgia (Annie Parisse), who is more conservative in her viewpoints than Southerlyn. He is portrayed as having an amicable working relationship with ADA Connie Rubirosa (Alana de la Garza).

Branch strongly supported the Iraq War. He does not oppose same-sex marriage, nor does he particularly approve of it; he believes that it is none of his business nor that of the U.S. federal government. While his legal philosophy is decidedly conservative, he is not blindly partisan; he ascribes cynical, political motives to drug prohibition, refers to the U.S. National Guard as "the Dan Quayle Brigade", and is not averse to seeking alternatives to the death penalty when he thinks it appropriate. Although he is personally pro-life, he describes himself as even more "pro-law", and orders Olivia Benson (Mariska Hargitay) and Casey Novak (Diane Neal) to arrest a doctor who deliberately misled a young pregnant woman to ensure her pregnancy would develop past the legal time limit for the procedure, thus prompting her to desperately ask her boyfriend to assault her to induce a still birth. In the episode "Ain't No Love", he fires Southerlyn because he feels she is inappropriately sympathetic towards a defendant she is prosecuting. Despite her parting fears, Branch says he is not firing her because she is a lesbian.

In May 2007, less than two weeks after the final episode of Law & Order season 17 aired, Thompson left the cast to run for the Republican Party's nomination for the 2008 United States presidential election. No reason is given for Branch's departure; the new season of Law & Order did not start until January 2008, so it was on a November 2007 episode of Special Victims Unit that McCoy is revealed to have been chosen to serve out the remainder of Branch's term. In Branch's final scene, he suggests that McCoy might run for District Attorney in the future; McCoy says "I'm no politician, Arthur" and Branch replies, "Yeah... everybody says that." This contradicts a prior statement he made to McCoy, several episodes earlier, telling the latter in admonishment: "You're a helluva prosecutor, Jack. But, you'll never be a District Attorney." In October 2009, Executive ADA Michael Cutter (Linus Roache) tells McCoy that the producers of a reality TV show set on Long Island want Branch to be a judge, where he will preside in a trial featuring the heads of two dysfunctional households who are both suspects in a murder.

== Appearances on other TV series ==
- Law & Order: Special Victims Unit
  - Season Four
    - Episode 21: "Fallacy"
  - Season Five
    - Episode 2: "Manic"
    - Episode 4: "Loss"
    - Episode 5: "Serendipity"
    - Episode 8: "Abomination"
    - Episode 10: "Shaken"
  - Season Six
    - Episode 20: "Night"
    - Episode 23: "Goliath"
  - Season Seven
    - Episode 8: "Starved"
    - Episode 9: "Rockabye"
    - Episode 16: "Gone"
- Law & Order: Criminal Intent
  - Season Five
    - Episode 7: "In the Wee Small Hours, Part 2"
- Conviction
  - Pilot episode
