= Bruce Ornstein =

American actor and director (born 1957)

- Born: 1957 (age 68–69)
- Occupations: Actor, director

Bruce Ornstein (born 1957) is an American actor and director known for the role of "Gus" in the 1977 film, Saturday Night Fever.

== Career ==
Ornstein's acting career started with Saturday Night Fever. Following the release of the film, he has appeared in a number of films, television movies, television program episodes, and stage plays. His film credits include Jack and His Friends, starring Sam Rockwell, which he wrote and directed. In 2012, he co-wrote and directed the independent film, Vamperifica, for Blood River Productions. Vamperifica won numerous awards, including Best Picture, and Best Vampire Comedy at the 2012 Indie Horror Festival, as well as Best Horror Comedy and Audience Award at the Bram Stoker International Horror Festival in Whitby, UK.

In addition to screenwriting and directing, Ornstein teaches acting in New York City, having created the Bruce Ornstein Acting Workshop in 1997. He is currently an adjunct professor in the Columbia University MFA Program for Film.
