= Jack McCoy =

Law & Order character

- Law & Order character
- First appearance: "Second Opinion" "Entitled" (SVU)
- Last appearance: "Last Dance" (Law & Order) "The Undiscovered Country" (SVU)
- Portrayed by: Sam Waterston

In-universe information
- Spouses: Ellen (divorced); Unnamed ex-wife
- Children: Rebecca McCoy
- Relatives: Linc (grandson); Unnamed granddaughter Unnamed nephew Unnamed great-niece
- Seasons: L&O: 5, 6, 7, 8, 9, 10, 11, 12, 13, 14, 15, 16, 17, 18, 19, 20, 21, 22, 23; SVU: 1, 9, 11, 19; TBJ: 1

John James McCoy is a fictional character in the American television drama Law & Order. He was created by Dick Wolf and Michael S. Chernuchin and has been portrayed by Sam Waterston during the show's original run from 1994 to 2010 and again from 2022 until his retirement in 2024. He is the longest-tenured character on the show, appearing in 19 seasons. In addition to appearances in 405 episodes of Law & Order, the character appeared in other shows across the Law & Order franchise, including four episodes of Law & Order: Special Victims Unit, two episodes of Law & Order: Trial by Jury, two crossover episodes of Homicide: Life on the Street, and the made-for-TV movie Exiled.

Waterston's performance as McCoy on the New York–based series was so popular that it resulted in Waterston being declared a "Living Landmark" by the New York Landmarks Conservancy, in a joint recognition with fellow longtime series cast member Jerry Orbach, who portrayed NYPD detective Lennie Briscoe on Law & Order for 12 seasons.

== Character overview ==
McCoy is introduced as Executive Assistant District Attorney by Adam Schiff (Steven Hill) in the season five premiere episode "Second Opinion". He has been nicknamed "Hang 'em High McCoy". He describes himself as a "junkyard dog". He is well-respected in the legal community, once referred to as "the top of the legal food chain" by a rival attorney during a trial.

Following the 17th season (2006–2007), McCoy is appointed interim district attorney, taking over from Arthur Branch (Fred Thompson). McCoy's appearance on Law & Order: Special Victims Unit on the November 13, 2007, episode "Blinded" marked his first appearance in the Law & Order universe as district attorney.

Law & Order originally ceased production in 2010, but McCoy (though not seen) was still occasionally referenced as the Manhattan DA in Law & Order: Special Victims Unit in several episodes through 2011. A reference to "the new DA" in a 2013 SVU episode suggested that McCoy had left the position, although his replacement was unnamed. Among the new DA's staffing changes were making Cutter a Bureau Chief ADA of the Special Victims Unit. Cutter, in turn, was replaced as EADA by David Haden. The new DA's career was eventually one of several ended by the massive statewide scandal involving madam Delia Wilson and her sex trafficking ring. This made McCoy the DA again in 2018, appearing in the SVU episode "The Undiscovered Country". In 2022, he appeared as the DA in the revival of the original Law & Order, with ADAs Nolan Price (Hugh Dancy) and Samantha Maroun (Odelya Halevi) working under him.

Waterston made his final appearance as McCoy in the 2024 episode "Last Dance". In the episode, a case in which a politically connected tech billionaire is charged with murdering a woman he had raped years earlier earns McCoy the enmity of New York City Mayor Robert Payne (Bruce Altman), who threatens to destroy his career and those of Nolan and Maroun unless they back off from calling his son as a witness, which would reveal the younger Payne's extramarital affairs. McCoy prosecutes the case himself and obtains a guilty verdict; he then resigns as DA so the governor will appoint an interim successor, thus denying the vindictive Payne the chance to run him out of office and replace him with a lackey who would fire every ADA on his staff.

== Personal life ==
McCoy was abused by his father, a Chicago policeman who had also beat Jack's mother, and who eventually died of cancer. McCoy says his determination and unyielding work ethic are a byproduct of having been harshly punished by his father for losing at anything. He also revealed his father was a racist who once hit him for dating a Polish girl. McCoy disliked his father, calling him a "son-of-a-bitch"; however, he admits he could have easily become like him. While not an Irish nationalist, he cares enough about his Irish heritage to be offended by a suspect's father's insinuation two murder suspects committed the crime because of their "Irish temper". McCoy attended University of Chicago and New York University School of Law.

McCoy has been divorced twice (one ex-wife having been a former assistant) and has an adult daughter, Rebecca, with first ex-wife Ellen. One of his ex-wives left him because he worked too many late nights. In 2006, a gossip columnist writes McCoy has not seen or spoken to his daughter since 1997, and McCoy receives an envelope containing pictures of his daughter. McCoy reunites with Rebecca (Jamie Schofield) when they meet for dinner in 2007, and in 2008 mentions she has taken a job in San Diego, and she drove up to Los Angeles to meet him there for dinner while he was attending a conference on official business. In 2023, when Rebecca (Elisabeth Waterston) is the attorney for a defendant being prosecuted by McCoy's office, it is revealed he has a son-in-law, Eric, and a college-aged grandson (attending Northwestern) named Linc; a year later, he mentions he has a then 14-year-old granddaughter. He also has a nephew, which indicates he has at least one sibling. By 2008, his nephew has had a young daughter.

McCoy has a reputation for having romantic affairs with his female ADAs. The ADAs with whom McCoy had affairs included Sally Bell (Edie Falco), who later became a defense attorney; Diana Hawthorne (Laila Robins); and Claire Kincaid (Jill Hennessy). McCoy also had a romantic relationship with his frequent courtroom adversary, defense attorney Vanessa Galiano (Roma Maffia). Defense attorneys have used his sexual history against him.

McCoy was raised Catholic, but describes himself as a "lapsed Catholic". McCoy was educated by the Jesuits. On several occasions, religion has been the subject of various cases. In the episode "Thrill", in which two teenaged boys are accused of killing a man for fun, McCoy finds his case particularly complicated when one of the suspects confesses the crime to his uncle, a priest. When the confession tape is labeled privileged, McCoy ignores the bishop's request to preserve the sacrament of reconciliation and instead tries to use the tape as evidence. When Detective Rey Curtis (Benjamin Bratt) tries to dissuade McCoy from doing so, reminding him that he is a Catholic, McCoy responds, "Not when I'm at work."

== Reception ==
Entertainment Weekly television critic Ken Tucker has praised Law & Order's creator Dick Wolf for putting McCoy at the center of "some of the best episodes of the immortal series' 19th season." According to Tucker, riding herd "over a couple of stubborn young bucks — assistant DAs Mike Cutter (Linus Roache) and Connie Rubirosa (Alana de la Garza) — McCoy argues, bellows orders, and croaks with outrage when his charges disobey his legal advice".

== District attorney's office timeline ==
(note this does not count anyone who was in charge for when Law & Order was off the air.)

Time period	Executive assistant district attorney (EADA)	Assistant district attorney (ADA)	District attorney (DA)
1990-1992	Benjamin Stone	Paul Robinette	Adam Schiff
1992-1994	Benjamin Stone	Paul Robinette	Adam Schiff
1994–1996	Jack McCoy	Claire Kincaid	Adam Schiff
1996–1998	Jack McCoy	Jamie Ross	Adam Schiff
1998–2000	Jack McCoy	Abbie Carmichael	Adam Schiff
2000–2001	Jack McCoy	Abbie Carmichael	Nora Lewin
2001–2002	Jack McCoy	Serena Southerlyn	Nora Lewin
2002–2005	Jack McCoy	Serena Southerlyn	Arthur Branch
2005–2006	Jack McCoy	Alexandra Borgia	Arthur Branch
2006–2007	Jack McCoy	Connie Rubirosa	Arthur Branch
2008–2010	Michael Cutter	Connie Rubirosa	Jack McCoy
2022–2024	Nolan Price	Samantha Maroun	Jack McCoy

== Appearances on other TV shows ==
- Homicide: Life on the Street
  - Season 6
    - Episode 5: "Baby, It's You"
  - Season 7
    - Episode 15: "Sideshow"
- Law & Order: Special Victims Unit
  - Season 1
    - Episode 15: "Entitled"
  - Season 9
    - Episode 7: "Blinded"
  - Season 11
    - Episode 21: "Torch"
  - Season 19
    - Episode 13: "The Undiscovered Country"
- Law & Order: Trial by Jury
  - Episode 1: "The Abominable Showman"
  - Episode 8: "Skeleton"

== Credits ==
Seasons	Years	Episodes																							
Seasons	Years	1	2	3	4	5	6	7	8	9	10	11	12	13	14	15	16	17	18	19	20	21	22	23	24
5	1994–95																								
6	1995–96																								
7	1996–97																								
8	1997–98																								
9	1998–99																								
10	1999–2000																								
11	2000–01																								
12	2001–02																								
13	2002–03																								
14	2003–04																								
15	2004–05																								
16	2005–06																								
17	2006–07																								
18	2008																								
19	2008–09											×													
20	2009–10																								
21	2022																								
22	2022-23																								
23	2024																								
Seasons	Years	1	2	3	4	5	6	7	8	9	10	11	12	13	14	15	16	17	18	19	20	21	22	23	24
Seasons	Years	Episodes																							

Regular cast

×	Regular cast + no appearance

Recurring cast

No credit + no appearance
