= Danielle Melnick =

- Law & Order character
- First appearance: "Aria"; October 1, 1991
- Last appearance: "Good Faith"; March 30, 2007
- Portrayed by: Tovah Feldshuh

Danielle Rose Melnick is a fictional character on the NBC crime drama Law & Order. She is portrayed by the actress Tovah Feldshuh. She made her first of 13 appearances on the show as Melnick in 1991, although Feldshuh had already appeared in an earlier 1991 episode ("Aria"), where she plays a character very similar to Melnick but is a probate lawyer, not a litigator, and is unnamed.

Melnick is a New York City–based defense attorney with a practice spanning more than 20 years. She is portrayed as a well-established, high-profile litigator, regularly going up against the toughest, most powerful prosecutors in the New York City District Attorney's office. Her role in the Law & Order universe has been as a foil for Ben Stone (Michael Moriarty) and Jack McCoy (Sam Waterston). She has had an affectionately competitive friendship with the latter since the early days of their careers.

Melnick is dedicated to her job and is often shown to be a thorn in the side of the DA's office. Much like the character McCoy, she is so zealous in her job that she will bend (but never break) trial laws to win a case, and sometimes risks being put in contempt of court for antagonizing a judge.

In the 2002 episode "Open Season," she is very nearly disbarred and murdered in a case where she is representing a white supremacist accused of murdering a defense attorney. After the trial judge prohibits her client from receiving mail, she—angry about the decision—passes along an address to one of the man's associates, after he assures her that it will produce evidence that can clear him. Unbeknownst to her, however, it is actually the address of one of the terrorist's intended targets, who is soon murdered. She is arrested and charged as an accessory. She is horrified by what her client has done but refuses to break attorney–client privilege, even if it means she will go to prison.

McCoy, reluctant to prosecute his old friend, ends up saving her by lying to the terrorist, telling him that Melnick had confessed to unwittingly helping him and that he would go to prison for life unless he admitted that she had not known what he was going to do with the information. Melnick is cleared of all charges but is shot soon after by one of her former client's followers. She recovers a few episodes later and returns to her practice.

In 2011, Melnick appeared in the Law & Order: Criminal Intent finale "To the Boy in the Blue Knit Cap" on June 26, now specializing in real estate law.

Feldshuh appeared in the inaugural episode of Chicago Justice, "Fake," on March 1, 2017, portraying Melnick as a judge.
