= Jace Alexander =

American television director and actor (born 1964)

- Born: Jason Alexander; April 7, 1964 (age 62); New York City, U.S.
- Occupations: Actor, television director
- Years active: 1984–2015
- Spouse: Maddie Corman (m. 1998)
- Children: 3
- Mother: Jane Alexander
- Criminal information
- Status: Probation
- Convictions: Promoting a sexual performance by a child; Possession of an obscene performance by a child
- Penalty: 10 year probation and permanent registry as a sex offender

Details
- Date apprehended: July 29, 2015

Jason "Jace" Alexander (born April 7, 1964) is an American former actor and television director. In 2015, Alexander was arrested for the downloading and file sharing of child pornography, and later pleaded guilty to one count of promoting a sexual performance by a child and one count of possessing an obscene sexual performance by a child.

== Career ==
=== Acting ===
After attending New York University, Alexander began his professional career as the stage manager of a 1983 Broadway revival of The Caine Mutiny Court Martial, in which he also played a small role. Alexander appeared on stage in I'm Not Rappaport, Six Degrees of Separation and notably the Stephen Sondheim musical Assassins, in which he portrayed Lee Harvey Oswald. His screen roles include City of Hope, Love and a .45, Matewan, Eight Men Out, Mistress, Crocodile Dundee II and Clueless.

=== Directing ===
In the early 1990s, Alexander studied at the American Film Institute, where he became interested in directing. His television credits include 32 episodes of Law & Order (on which his stepfather Ed Sherin served as an executive producer) and 18 episodes of Rescue Me, in addition to Xena: Warrior Princess, Arli$$, Homicide: Life on the Street, The Practice, Ally McBeal, Third Watch, House M.D., Prison Break, Golden Boy, Jodi Arias: Dirty Little Secret and the pilots for Burn Notice, Warehouse 13, Royal Pains, and Three Inches.

Alexander was second vice president of the Directors Guild of America, but resigned only two months after his arrest on child pornography charges. He was replaced by Brooke Kennedy.

== Personal life ==
Alexander was born Jason Alexander in New York City, the only son of actress Jane Alexander and her first husband Robert, founder and former director of Living Stage Theatre Company.

Alexander married actress Maddie Corman in September 1998. Alexander and Corman formerly lived in Dobbs Ferry, New York, but moved after Alexander's guilty plea.

=== Child pornography charges ===
On July 24, 2015, police discovered child pornography uploaded from an IP address assigned to Alexander's home in Dobbs Ferry. He was arrested on July 29 for the downloading and file sharing of child pornography. An investigation of his computers and hard drives in his home revealed files of minors engaged in sexual acts.

Alexander was charged with one count of promoting a sexual performance by a child and one count of possessing an obscene sexual performance by a child, facing a maximum of seven years in state prison. In January 2016, he pleaded guilty to the charges. In June 2016, he was sentenced to 10 years' probation; he must also register as a sex offender in New York.

== Filmography ==
Year	Title	Role
1987	Matewan	Hillard Elkins
1988	Crocodile Dundee II	Rat
1988	Eight Men Out	Dickey Kerr
1990	High Score	M.K. / M.J.
1991	City of Hope	Bobby
1992	Mistress	Stuart Stratland Jr.
1994	Love and a .45	Creepy Cody
1995	Clueless	Robber
