= Edwin Sherin =

American-Canadian actor, director (1930–2017)

- Born: January 15, 1930; Harrisburg, Pennsylvania, U.S.
- Died: May 4, 2017 (aged 87); Lockeport, Nova Scotia, Canada
- Other name: Ed Sherin
- Occupations: Actor, director, producer
- Years active: 1971–2009
- Spouse(s): Pamela Vevers (divorced) Jane Alexander (m. 1975)
- Children: 3
- Relatives: Jace Alexander (stepson)

Edwin Sherin (January 15, 1930 – May 4, 2017) was an American-Canadian director and producer. He is best known as the director and executive producer of the NBC drama series Law & Order (1991–2005).

== Early life ==
Sherin was born in Danville, Pennsylvania, the son of Ruth (née Berger), a homemaker, and Joseph Sherin, a textile worker. He grew up in Hattiesburg, Mississippi, and Inwood, Manhattan. He had a sister, Edith Sherin Markson, who was among the founders of the Milwaukee Repertory Theater.

When he was 16 years old, Sherin dropped out of DeWitt Clinton High School and traveled to West Texas, where he worked on a cattle ranch. He eventually resumed his education at the Fountain Valley School in Colorado Springs, graduating in 1948. In 1952, he graduated from Brown University, where he received a degree in international relations. After graduation, Sherin enlisted in the Navy and fought in the Korean War.

== Career ==
Sherin started out as an actor, training at the Paul Mann's Actors Workshop and studying with John Houseman at the American Shakespeare Theatre.

He met Jane Alexander while serving as the resident director at Washington, DC's Arena Stage, where he cast her and James Earl Jones in The Great White Hope. In 1968, he directed the play and its two stars on Broadway, and the production marked the start not only of his Broadway directorial career, but a long professional and personal relationship with Alexander as well. In August 1973, he cast Jones as King Lear for his production on King Lear at The Public Theater's Shakespeare in the Park.

He directed Alexander in First Monday in October on Broadway in 1978, Hedda Gabler at the Hartman Theatre (Connecticut) in 1981 in the American Playhouse television movie A Marriage: Georgia O'Keeffe and Alfred Stieglitz, in 1991. and in the Broadway revival of The Visit.

Sherin directed six plays at Washington, D.C.'s Arena Stage, one per season for six consecutive seasons: The Wall (1963–64), Galileo (1964–65), St. Joan (1965–66), Macbeth (1966–67), The Iceman Cometh (1967–68), and King Lear (1968–69).

Sherin won the 1969 Drama Desk Award for Outstanding Director for The Great White Hope and was nominated for a 1974 Tony Award for Best Direction of a Play, for Find Your Way Home.

In 1972, he directed a revival of The Time of Your Life, at the Huntington Hartford Theater in Los Angeles, with a cast that included Henry Fonda, Richard Dreyfuss and Jane Alexander.

In 1974, Sherin directed a revival of A Streetcar Named Desire at London's Piccadilly Theatre with Claire Bloom, Martin Shaw, Joss Ackland, and Morag Hood.

In 2009, Sherin directed Alexander again in Thom Thomas's A Moon to Dance By at The Pittsburgh Playhouse, an then at the George Street Playhouse in New Brunswick, New Jersey.

=== Television ===
Sherin executive-produced 163 episodes of the NBC drama Law & Order, between 1993 and 2000. His television directing credits include 36 episodes of Law & Order; Hill Street Blues; L.A. Law; Doogie Howser, M.D.; Homicide: Life on the Street; and Medium.

Sherin directed the television films Lena: My 100 Children (1987), The Father Clements Story (1987), Settle the Score (1989), Daughter of the Streets (1990), and A Marriage: Georgia O'Keeffe and Alfred Stieglitz (1991).

=== Movies ===
Sherin directed two theatrical films: Valdez Is Coming with Burt Lancaster and Susan Clark and My Old Man's Place with William Devane and Michael Moriarty. Both films were released in 1971.

== Personal life ==
Sherin's first wife was actress Pamela Vevers, with whom he had three sons. The marriage ended in divorce. In 1975, he married actress Jane Alexander.

He and Alexander became Canadian citizens, having maintained a home in Lockeport, Nova Scotia starting in 1998.

== Death ==
Sherin died on May 4, 2017, in Nova Scotia, aged 87.

== Theatre director ==
Broadway

- Prymate (2004)
- The Visit (1992 revival)
- Goodbye Fidel (1980)
- First Monday in October (1978)
- Do You Turn Somersaults? (1978) (also at the Kennedy Center)
- The Eccentricities of a Nightingale (1976)
- Rex (1976)
- Sweet Bird of Youth (1975 revival)
- Of Mice and Men (1974 revival)
- 6 Rms Riv Vu (1972)
- An Evening With Richard Nixon and... by Gore Vidal (1972)

Off-Broadway

- The White Rose and the Red (1964)

London West End

- A Streetcar Named Desire (1974)
