= David Platt (director) =

American film and television director

- Occupation(s): Television director, producer, former sound engineer and actor
- Years active: 1980–present

David Platt is an American film and television director. He has directed many episodes of Law & Order and its spin-off Law & Order: Special Victims Unit, as well as an episode of The Wire. For The Wire Platt directed the fifth episode of the fourth season, "Alliances". Show runner David Simon praised Platt's deft touch with the young actors and the scene where the boys discover a corpse in a vacant house. He has a house in Pennsylvania, and is friends with independent filmmaker/producer Carlton J. Albright.

== Filmography ==
- Body of Proof
  - Episode 8: "Buried Secrets".
- House
- Law & Order: Special Victims Unit
- The Wire
  - Episode 4.05 "Alliances" (2006)
- Law & Order
- Law & Order: Trial by Jury
- Queens Supreme (2003)
- Law & Order: Criminal Intent
- Hack (2002)
- Judging Amy
- The Education of Max Bickford (2001)
- The Agency (2001)
- Deadline (2000)
- NYC 22 (2012)
- Lie to Me S03E04
