= Matthew Penn =

American director and producer

- Born: 1959 (age 66–67)
- Education: Wesleyan University
- Occupations: Television/theatre director, producer
- Years active: 1976–present

Matthew Penn (born 1959) is an American director and television and film producer. His father was Arthur Penn, a film and theatre director. His mother was actress Peggy Maurer. He grew up in Stockbridge, Massachusetts, and New York City.

Prior to beginning work in television, Penn spent many years working as an actor and director in theatre and is currently a co-artistic director of the Berkshire Playwrights Lab located in Great Barrington, Massachusetts.

Penn has directed and produced over 150 prime-time TV dramas. Some of his directorial credits include NYPD Blue, Law & Order, New York Undercover, Brooklyn South, The Sopranos, House, Damages, The Closer, and Royal Pains. He was nominated for an Emmy Award in 1999 for directing the 200th episode of Law & Order, guest-starring Julia Roberts. He was an executive producer of Law & Order from 2003 to 2007 and Queen of the South in 2016.
