= Constantine Makris =

Greek-American cinematographer

- Occupations: Cinematographer, television director, television producer.
- Years active: 1974–present
- Awards: Emmy for Outstanding Cinematography, Single Camera Series (3)

Constantine Makris A.S.C. is a Greek-American cinematographer, television director and television producer who has mainly worked on Dick Wolf's series. For his work on Law & Order, he won Emmys for Outstanding Cinematography, Single Camera Series in 1993, 1997 and 1998.

He studied political science, engaging in various jobs after graduation, including that of a taxi driver. His first, brief stint in cinematography was as a director's assistant for a commercial. Later on, he met Larry Pizer BSC with whom he collaborated. Makris has not had formal cinematography studies, but instead gained expertise working alongside accomplished directors.

== Selected filmography ==
=== As director ===
- Manifest
- Instinct
- Ten Days in the Valley
- The Lizzie Borden Chronicles
- Orange Is the New Black
- Law & Order
- Law & Order: Special Victims Unit
- Law & Order: Criminal Intent
- Law & Order: Trial by Jury
- Law & Order: Los Angeles
- Conviction
- 30 Rock
- Damages
- Warehouse 13
- FlashForward
- Criminal Minds
- Royal Pains
- Rescue Me
- Quantico
- Chicago Fire
- Chicago P.D. (not credited)
- Chicago Med (not credited)

=== As cinematographer ===
- Tracey Ullman Takes on New York
- Law & Order

=== As producer ===
- Conviction
