= Puerto Rican Day Parade =

Annual parade along Fifth Avenue in Manhattan, New York City, US

Coordinates: 40°45′18″N 73°58′47″W

Puerto Rican Day Parade (also known as the National Puerto Rican Day Parade)
- Status: Active
- Genre: Parade
- Frequency: 2nd Sunday of June
- Venue: 5th Avenue
- Location: New York City
- Country: United States
- Previous event: June 8, 2025
- Next event: June 14, 2026
- Sponsor: National Puerto Rican Day Parade, Inc. (since 1995)
- Website: nprdpinc.org, official website of the National Puerto Rican Day Parade, Inc.

The Puerto Rican Day Parade (also known as the National Puerto Rican Day Parade) takes place annually in the United States along 5th Avenue in New York City. Established in 1958, the parade is held on the second Sunday in June, in honor of the 3.2 million inhabitants of Puerto Rico and all people of Puerto Rican birth or heritage residing on the U.S. mainland. The parade attracts many celebrities, both Puerto Rican and of Puerto Rican heritage, and many politicians from the Tri-State area. It is the only Latino heritage parade that takes place on iconic 5th Avenue and is the oldest and longest running Latino heritage parade in all of the city.

The parade marches along 5th Avenue from 44th Street to 86th Street and has grown to become one of the largest parades in the United States, with nearly four million spectators annually by 2007. Although the largest Puerto Rican cultural parade is in New York City, other cities with large Puerto Rican populations, such as Philadelphia, Chicago, and Boston, also have notable Puerto Rican parades and festivals.

== History ==
Frankie Cutlass at the Puerto Rican Day Parade 2006

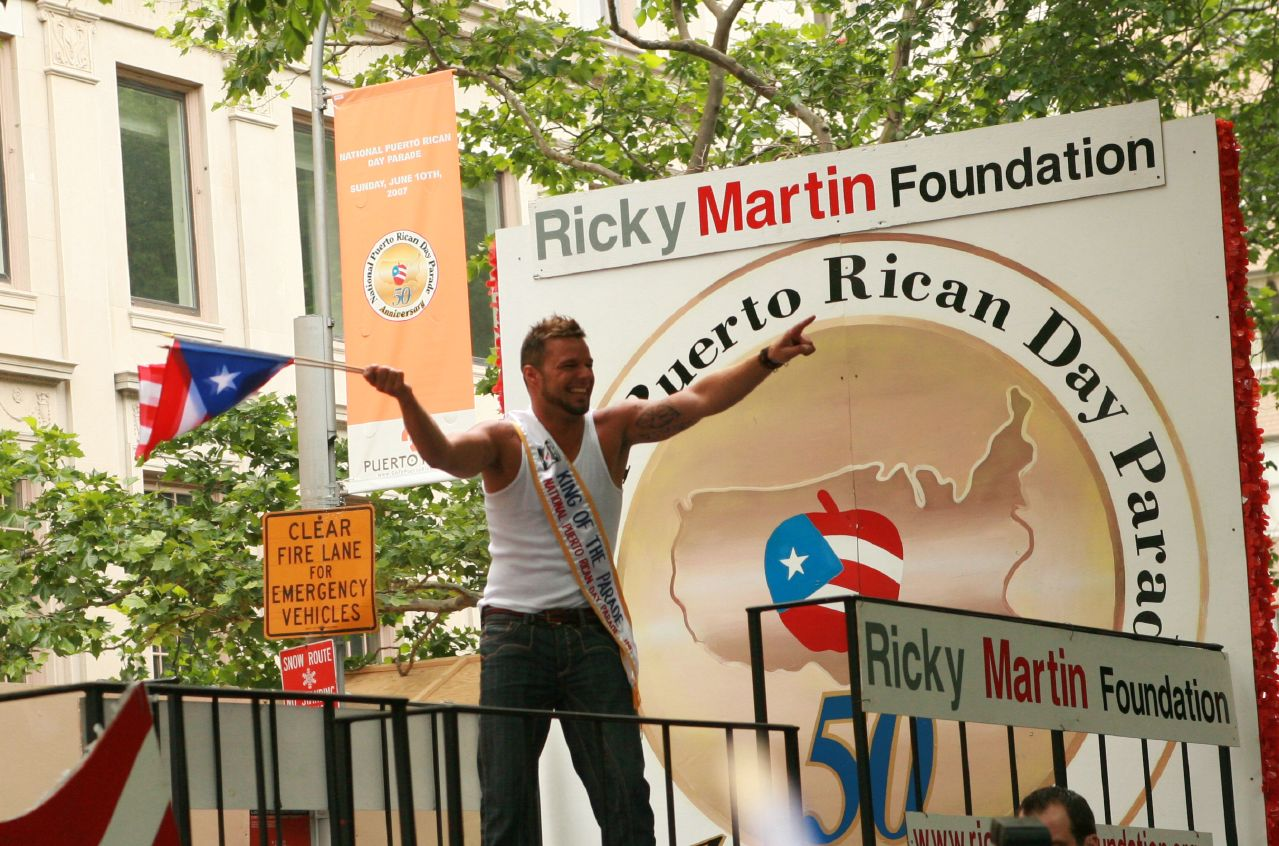
Ricky Martin as the parade's grand marshal in 2007

The first Puerto Rican Day Parade was held on Sunday, April 13, 1958, in New York City, replacing the former Hispanic Day Parade. This move, part of the mission of the Catholic Archdiocese of New York (esp., Cardinal Spellman and Ivan Illich) represented a shift away from earlier attempts at "Yankeefication" toward culturally specific expressions based on traditional fiestas patronales. In 1995, the parade became incorporated as the National Puerto Rican Day Parade and expanded beyond the parade venue itself. The parade now hosts over seven major events throughout the city.

There are dozens of other events that also take place the weekend of the parade that are not sponsored by the National Parade's corporation. One of the longest running is the street fair held one day prior to the parade. Though the size has changed over the years the heart of the parade has always been at 116th Street between Lexington and Second avenues. In addition to the parade in New York City, there are currently over fifty smaller parades that take place throughout the United States.

In 1994 - Hip Hop music has deeply entered the parade - both literally as a dedicated cultural movement and as an anthem. Trailblazing Latino artists who popularized early hip-hop anthems with explicit Puerto Rican pride, such as Frankie Cutlass and Prince Markie Dee of The Fat Boys, were among the first prominent rappers to champion Puerto Rican heritage in the New York-area parades. Throughout the 1990s and into the 2000s, legendary figures and parade honorees like Fat Joe and Big Pun brought their groundbreaking East Coast rap dominance directly to the event, solidifying Boricua culture's lasting footprint in American hip-hop. The inclusion of these artists in the festivities served to bridge traditional island sounds with the rap mainstream, paving the way for later legends like Tego Calderón, Daddy Yankee, Don Omar, Hector El Father, Wisin & Yandel, and modern superstars like Bad Bunny.

The parade has attracted many New York politicians including mayor Michael Bloomberg, former mayor Rudy Giuliani, Governor Andrew Cuomo and Senator Charles Schumer, as well as many political candidates running for office and looking for voters in local, state and national elections. In recent years, the parade has honored several Puerto Rican celebrities by naming them "International Grand Marshal" of the parade including singer Marc Anthony, who participated in the parade along with his ex-wife Jennifer Lopez, and Ricky Martin in 2007 and 2010.

In 2009, organizers selected internationally recognized telenovela actor Osvaldo Ríos, as the parade's "Special Guest Star".

In addition to a National Grand Marshal, a variety of honorees are named for the parade, with titles such as "King", "National Ambassador of La Salsa", and "National Godmother". In June 2004, Puerto Rican rapper Ivy Queen was designated as the "Puerto Rico Youth Godmother" of the parade. Others to be given such titles include Wisin & Yandel and Willie Colón.

In June 2025, Pablo Hernández Rivera participated in the Puerto Rican parade in New York, United States, which would make him the first resident commissioner in Washington to attend the celebration of Puerto Rican identity in the United States since Aníbal Acevedo Vilá.

== In popular culture ==
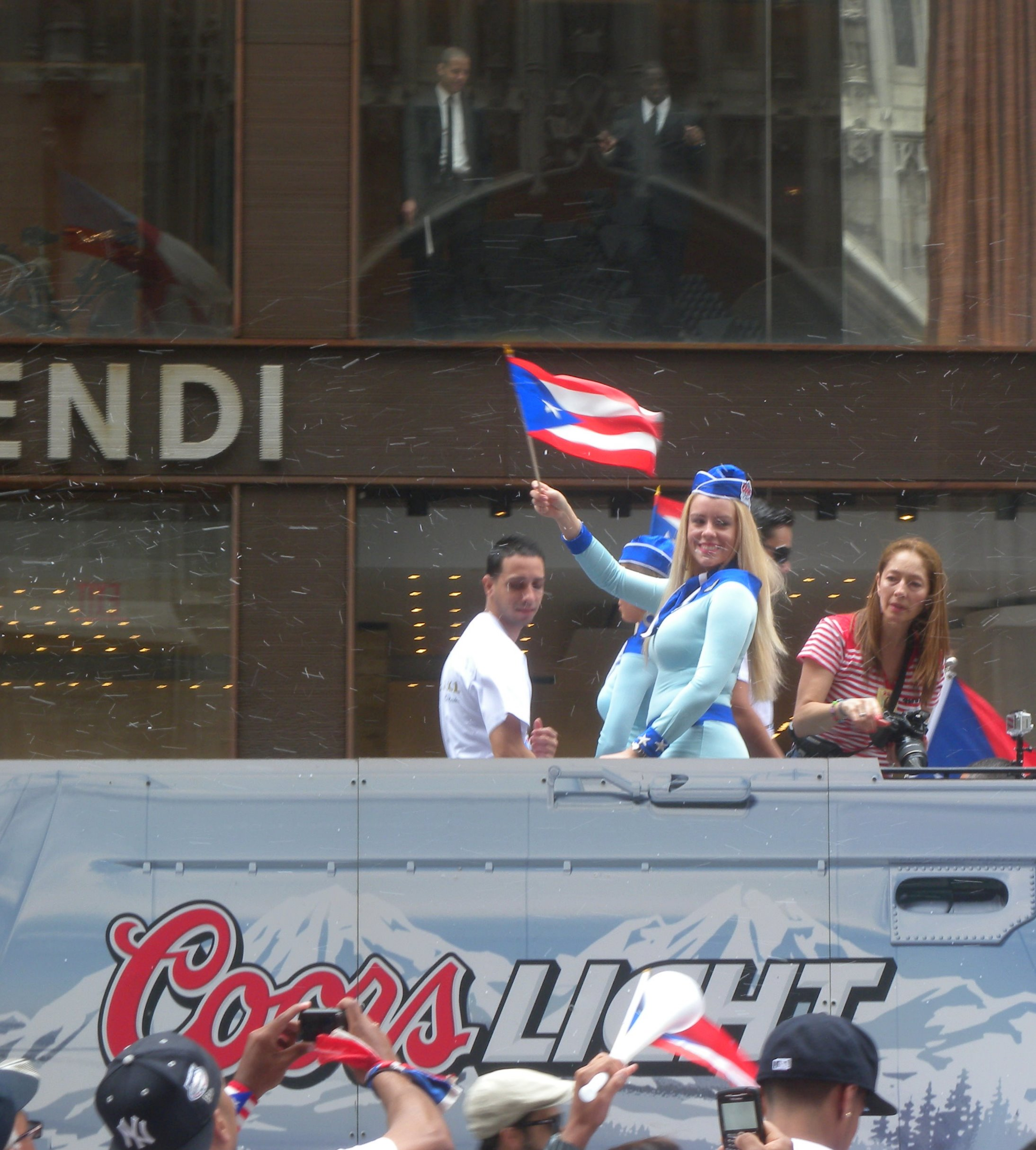
Scene from the 2011 parade.

The parade itself has been featured in an episode of the NBC television sitcom Seinfeld entitled "The Puerto Rican Day" (S09E20). In it, Jerry Seinfeld, George Costanza, Elaine Benes, and Cosmo Kramer get stuck in a traffic jam as a result of the parade. Due to controversy relating to a scene in which Kramer accidentally burns and then stomps on a Puerto Rican flag and is chased by a mob of angry Puerto Ricans, NBC refused to air the episode again. The episode was also withheld from syndication as a result, but has been shown sparingly in syndicated repeats since 2002 and has been released on DVD along with all of the sitcom's episodes, and it is part of the series' streaming package.

The parade was portrayed in a negative aspect following the controversial 2000 parade in a 2001 episode of the long-running NBC crime series Law & Order entitled "Sunday in the Park with Jorge" (S11E11). Before the National Puerto Rican Coalition protested the episode, network executives issued an apology. The company also made a pledge to "improve our procedures regarding sensitive programming issues".

The Latin American literary classic Empire of Dreams (1994) by Giannina Braschi staged a revolution on the Puerto Rican Day Parade.

The parade has been referenced on the Tru TV show Impractical Jokers within multiple episodes, satirically introduced as a joke about castmember Sal Vulcano's heritage, which is Cuban, but often mistaken for Mexican or Puerto Rican.

== Controversies ==
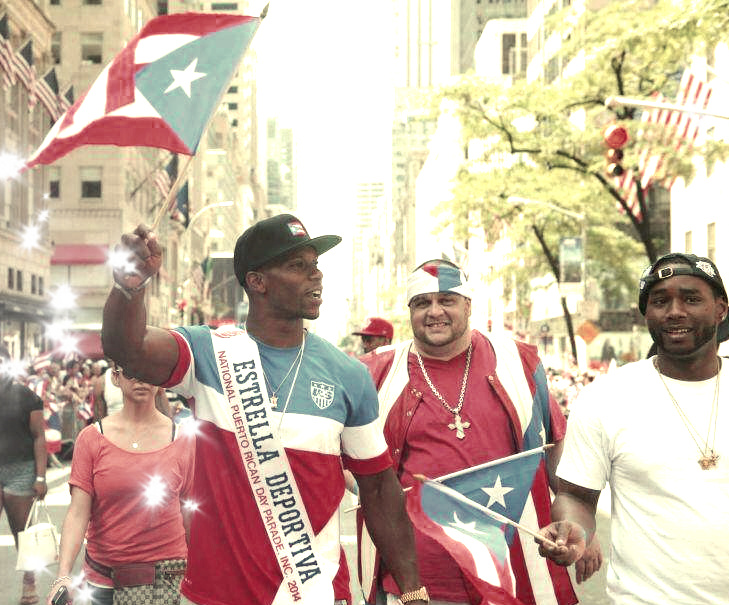
New York Giants NFL Legend Super Bowl XLVI Champion Victor Cruz and award winning platinum artist and producer Frankie Cutlass march in the 2014 parade.

In June 2010, controversy arose after organizers selected telenovela actor Osvaldo Ríos, who served three months in a Puerto Rican prison in 2004 for assaulting his former girlfriend after a domestic-violence incident as the parade's "International Godfather". Many confirmed participants such as U.S. Representative Luis Guiterrez and corporate sponsors such as Verizon withdrew their participation and endorsements due to his controversial past. After mounting pressure from both the media, politicians, public officials, and domestic violence organizations, Rios decided to not attend the parade after discussing the matter with his children and U.S. Congresswoman Nydia Velasquez. He was replaced at the last minute by singer Marc Anthony, who was accompanied by his then wife Jennifer Lopez.

In past interviews, actor and comedian John Leguizamo had always claimed Puerto Rican ancestry via his father's side, which was one of the reasons that he was selected as the 2011 Puerto Rican Day Parade Global Ambassador of the Arts. On June 10, 2011, Leguizamo's father, Albert, declared in an interview published in El Diario La Prensa, the largest Spanish-language newspaper in New York, that he was not Puerto Rican - but rather, of Colombian ancestry. This contradicted his son's past claims of Puerto Rican ancestry. In response to his father's allegations, Leguizamo stated in an interview that his grandfather was of Puerto Rican descent. A spokesman for the National Puerto Rican Day Parade stated that despite his shifting ancestry, Leguizamo would not be stripped of his ambassadorship, and would be allowed to participate in the June 2011 parade.

The theme of the 2015 parade had a strong historical focus. The year 2015 marked the 50th anniversary of the death of Pedro Albizu Campos, who spent 25 years in prison and dedicated his life to the independence of Puerto Rico.

Organizers of the 2017 parade chose to honor Oscar López Rivera, considered a terrorist by some and a freedom fighter by others. As a result of López Rivera being selected, parade sponsors Goya Foods, JetBlue, Coca-Cola, AT&T, and the New York Yankees dropped their sponsorship. New York City Police Department's Hispanic Society did not march, as well as NYPD's Gay Officer Action League and NYPD Police Commissioner James O'Neill. Some artists, such as Puerto Rican salsa singer Willie Colón criticized the parade organizers as having gone too far, while others, such as six-time Grammy Award-winning Puerto Rican salsa singer Gilberto Santa Rosa, chose to participate. Despite the controversy, the 60th Parade was celebrated on 12 June 2017. New York City mayor Bill de Blasio also participated greeting attendees and shaking hands. After public and corporate backlash, Mayor De Blasio had announced that López Rivera would not be honored at the 2017 parade but, in the end, the Puerto Rican activist was honored and kicked off the Parade celebration. López Rivera said he wished to keep the focus on Puerto Rico rather than himself.

== Security ==
Following the parade on June 11, 2000, a number of women were harassed, robbed and sexually assaulted by mobs of young men in and about Central Park. The attacks, which were videotaped by onlookers, led to the arrest and prosecution of many of those involved. Manuel Vargas, who was a suspected ringleader, was quoted by the press as saying he "was just having fun." In 2007, the presence of gangs such as the Latin Kings, the Bloods and the Crips have been recorded at the event.

== See also ==
- Nuyorican
- Puerto Ricans in New York City
