= 2000 Puerto Rican Day Parade attacks =

Attacks in New York City, US

The 2000 Puerto Rican Day Parade attacks occurred on June 11, 2000, in Manhattan, New York City, United States, and involved multiple assailants who harassed, sexually assaulted, and robbed random victims. Many of the attacks were caught on video, and received worldwide attention. The New York City Police Department was greatly criticized for its handling of the attacks. Eventually, over fifty women reported being sexually harassed or assaulted.

== Background ==
The Puerto Rican Day Parade, an annual event held on the second Sunday in June, marches down Fifth Avenue from 44th Street to 79th Street, passing by Central Park along the way. The temperature on June 11 was over 90 °F (32 °C). Parade observers noted the smell of marijuana in the air, and some reported that paraders were smoking in full presence of officers. The police disputed this claim. Other witnesses reported seeing attendees openly drinking alcohol. One witness later recalled seeing "alcohol all over the street, bottles of liquor, people offering shots."

Before noon, a group of three women were harassed and groped near the Metropolitan Museum of Art. Hours later, witnesses began noticing groups of men using water guns and other vessels to splash attendees indiscriminately as well as men shouting lewd insults at passing women. While there were nearly a thousand police officers assigned to Central Park during the parade, none were present along a stretch of Center Drive, where many of the more violent attacks would take place.

== Attacks ==
At 6:14 p.m. EDT, the first of the violent attacks began. At Simon Bolivar Plaza, near Sixth Avenue and Central Park South, a group of 15 to 20 men descended upon two teenagers, sprayed them with water, and proceeded to grope them. One victim was pushed to the ground and an assailant stole a pocketbook from them before moving on. A few minutes later, the attackers surrounded a French honeymooning couple on Center Drive near Wollman Rink. The group doused the woman with water, with some men reportedly chanting, "Soak her! Soak her!" The group then tore off her clothes and undergarments, groped her, and yanked her jewelry from her neck. Her husband attempted to save her, forcing his way through the crowd, and taking her out of the park to a policeman. The couple was ushered to a police scooter, but the crowd surrounded the scooter and attempted to continue the attack.

Soon after, another victim, skating down Central Park South, was sexually assaulted by a group of men. She was pulled to the ground and the assailants attempted to remove her shorts. The men eventually gave up after stealing her cell phone. The victim then attempted to report the attack to a policeman, who ignored her. Dozens of women were subsequently mobbed and assaulted. One of the last attacks was on a trio of British tourists at around 6:48 p.m. The three teenagers were sitting on a fence in the park when a group of men began groping them. One of the teenagers was forcibly separated from her group, stripped, and sexually assaulted. After a brief respite, a second group of men came upon her and sexually assaulted and robbed her.

== Aftermath ==
The New York City Police Department was widely criticized for its failures to stop or prevent the attacks. Mayor Rudy Giuliani initially defended the NYPD, remarking, "We have 41,000 police officers, and they can't be everywhere, at every point..." Police Commissioner Howard Safir told reporters, "If I put 10,000 cops in Central Park, we couldn't cover every single area." Giuliani later said that officers who had not helped victims "should be severely disciplined." Over 50 women came forward to report having been attacked.

In 2006, a civil suit against the city for failing to provide police protection was finally settled.

=== Charges ===
Manuel Vargas, a Dominican American from Washington Heights and a suspected ringleader, was quoted by the press as saying he "was just having fun". Eventually, 30 people were charged in the attacks, 18 pleaded guilty or were convicted, one was acquitted, and 11 had their charges dismissed. The longest sentence handed down was five years for Abel Ortiz. Eleven police officers and three 9-1-1 operators were disciplined, and the city paid over $500,000 in lawsuit settlements to victims. Mayor Giuliani banned alcohol at the parade the following year, though public consumption of alcohol was already illegal before the move.

== In media ==
The 2000 Puerto Rican Day Parade attacks formed the basis of the episode "Sunday in the Park with Jorge", of the NBC police procedural Law & Order, in which many women were accosted and one was found murdered in Central Park.
