= 2011–12 NFL playoffs =

American football tournament

- Dates: January 7–February 5, 2012
- Season: 2011
- Teams: 12
- Games played: 11
- Super Bowl XLVI site: Lucas Oil Stadium; Indianapolis, Indiana
- Defending champions: Green Bay Packers
- Champion: New York Giants (8th title)
- Runner-up: New England Patriots
- Conference runners-up: Baltimore Ravens; San Francisco 49ers
NFL playoffs
← 2010–11	2012–13 →

The National Football League playoffs for the 2011 season began on January 7, 2012. The postseason tournament concluded with the New York Giants defeating the New England Patriots in Super Bowl XLVI, 21–17, on February 5, at Lucas Oil Stadium in Indianapolis.

The Houston Texans qualified the playoffs for the first time since entering the league in 2002, and the Detroit Lions qualified for the first time since 1999. The Buffalo Bills, who were eliminated from playoff contention for the twelfth straight year then, were the only team that had not made the playoffs in the 21st century (and would not do so again until 2017). This team was tied with the Lions for the overall longest failure streak entering the season (the Bills had also not made the playoffs since qualifying as a wild card in 1999 where they were defeated by the Tennessee Titans).

This was the first postseason since 2001–02 to not feature Peyton Manning and the Indianapolis Colts.

Both the conferences’ runners-up made the Super Bowl the next year, which Baltimore won, 34–31.

Unless otherwise noted, all times listed are Eastern Standard Time (UTC−05)

== Overtime rules ==
This was the second postseason that the modified playoff overtime rules were in effect. Under these rules, instead of a straight sudden death, the game will not immediately end if the team that wins the coin toss scores a field goal on its first possession (the game will end if a touchdown is scored by the offense or if the defense scores a safety on the first possession of the overtime period). Instead, the other team will get a possession. If the loser of the coin toss scores a touchdown on that possession, it will be declared the winner. If the winner of the coin toss does not score on its first possession, or if both teams score field goals on their first possession, the game will revert to sudden death.

None of the games during the 2010–11 NFL playoffs went into overtime. The first overtime game that used these new rules was this postseason's Wild Card playoff game between the Pittsburgh Steelers and Denver Broncos at Sports Authority Field at Mile High. The Broncos won the coin toss and received. They proceeded to win the game 29–23 by scoring a touchdown on their first play from scrimmage, immediately ending the game.

Coincidentally, the same two teams had also played in the NFL's first regular season overtime game at Denver's Mile High Stadium on September 22, 1974, which resulted in a 35–35 tie.

After the season, this "modified sudden death" overtime system was applied to all preseason and regular season games.

== Participants ==
Within each conference, the four division winners and the top two non-division winners with the best overall regular season records) qualified for the playoffs. The four division winners are seeded 1–4 based on their overall won-lost-tied record, and the wild card teams are seeded 5–6. The NFL does not use a fixed bracket playoff system, and there are no restrictions regarding teams from the same division matching up in any round. In the first round, dubbed the wild-card playoffs or wild-card weekend, the third-seeded division winner hosts the sixth-seed wild card, and the fourth seed hosts the fifth. The 1 and 2 seeds from each conference received a first-round bye. In the second round, the divisional playoffs, the number 1 seed hosts the worst-surviving seed from the first round (seed 4, 5, or 6), while the number 2 seed will play the other team (seed 3, 4, or 5). The two surviving teams from each conference's divisional playoff games met in the respective AFC and NFC Conference Championship games, hosted by the higher seed. Although the Super Bowl, the championship round of the playoffs, is played at a neutral site, the designated home team is based on an annual rotation by conference.

Playoff seeds
Seed	AFC	NFC
1	New England Patriots (East winner)	Green Bay Packers (North winner)
2	Baltimore Ravens (North winner)	San Francisco 49ers (West winner)
3	Houston Texans (South winner)	New Orleans Saints (South winner)
4	Denver Broncos (West winner)	New York Giants (East winner)
5	Pittsburgh Steelers (wild card)	Atlanta Falcons (wild card)
6	Cincinnati Bengals (wild card)	Detroit Lions (wild card)

== Bracket ==
Jan 8 – MetLife Stadium	Jan 15 – Lambeau Field
5	Atlanta	2
4	NY Giants	37
4	NY Giants	24	Jan 22 – Candlestick Park
1	Green Bay	20
NFC
Jan 7 – Mercedes-Benz Superdome	4	NY Giants	20*
Jan 14 – Candlestick Park
2	San Francisco	17
6	Detroit	28	NFC Championship
3	New Orleans	32
3	New Orleans	45	Feb 5 – Lucas Oil Stadium
2	San Francisco	36
Wild Card playoffs
Divisional playoffs
Jan 7 – Reliant Stadium	N4	NY Giants	21
Jan 15 – M&T Bank Stadium
A1	New England	17
6	Cincinnati	10	Super Bowl XLVI
3	Houston	13
3	Houston	31	Jan 22 – Gillette Stadium
2	Baltimore	20
AFC
Jan 8 – Sports Authority Field at Mile High	2	Baltimore	20
Jan 14 – Gillette Stadium
1	New England	23
5	Pittsburgh	23	AFC Championship
4	Denver	10
4	Denver	29*
1	New England	45

* Indicates overtime victory

== Schedule ==
In the United States, NBC broadcast the first two Wild Card playoff games and Super Bowl XLVI. CBS telecast the rest of the AFC playoff games and Fox the rest of the NFC games.

Round	Away team	Score	Home team	Date	Kickoff (ET / UTC−5)	TV
Wild-card round	Cincinnati Bengals	10–31	Houston Texans	January 7, 2012	4:30 p.m.	NBC
Wild-card round	Detroit Lions	28–45	New Orleans Saints	January 7, 2012	8:00 p.m.	NBC
Wild-card round	Atlanta Falcons	2–24	New York Giants	January 8, 2012	1:00 p.m.	Fox
Wild-card round	Pittsburgh Steelers	23–29 (OT)	Denver Broncos	January 8, 2012	4:30 p.m.	CBS
Divisional round	New Orleans Saints	32–36	San Francisco 49ers	January 14, 2012	4:30 p.m.	Fox
Divisional round	Denver Broncos	10–45	New England Patriots	January 14, 2012	8:00 p.m.	CBS
Divisional round	Houston Texans	13–20	Baltimore Ravens	January 15, 2012	1:00 p.m.	CBS
Divisional round	New York Giants	37–20	Green Bay Packers	January 15, 2012	4:30 p.m.	Fox
Conference championships	Baltimore Ravens	20–23	New England Patriots	January 22, 2012	3:00 p.m.	CBS
Conference championships	New York Giants	20–17 (OT)	San Francisco 49ers	January 22, 2012	6:30 p.m.	Fox
Super Bowl XLVI Lucas Oil Stadium Indianapolis, Indiana	New York Giants	21–17	New England Patriots	February 5, 2012	6:30 p.m.	NBC

== Wild-card round ==
=== Saturday, January 7, 2012 ===
==== AFC: Houston Texans 31, Cincinnati Bengals 10 ====
Cincinnati Bengals vs. Houston Texans – Game summary

Quarter	1	2	3	4	Total
Bengals	7	3	0	0	10
Texans	7	10	7	7	31

at Reliant Stadium, Houston, Texas

- Date: January 7
- Game time: 4:30 p.m. EST/3:30 p.m. CST
- Game weather: Sunny played with roof closed, retractable roof stadium
- Game attendance: 71,725
- Referee: Clete Blakeman
- TV announcers (NBC): Tom Hammond (play-by-play), Mike Mayock (color commentator), and Alex Flanagan (sideline reporter)
- Recap

Game information

1st quarter

- CIN – Cedric Benson 1-yard run (Mike Nugent kick), 7:34. Bengals 7–0. Drive: 5 plays, 74 yards, 2:23.
- HOU – Arian Foster 8-yard run (Neil Rackers kick), 4:57. Tied 7–7. Drive: 6 plays, 80 yards, 2:37.

2nd quarter

- CIN – Mike Nugent 37-yard field goal, 7:09. Bengals 10–7. Drive: 8 plays, 61 yards, 4:15
- HOU – Neil Rackers 39-yard field goal, 1:48. Tied 10–10. Drive 13 plays, 59 yards, 5:21.
- HOU – J. J. Watt 29-yard interception return (Neil Rackers kick), 0:52. Texans 17–10.

3rd quarter

- HOU – Andre Johnson 40-yard pass from T. J. Yates (Neil Rackers kick), 1:08. Texans 24–10.Drive: 9 plays, 83 yards, 4:37.

4th quarter

- HOU – Arian Foster 42-yard run (Neil Rackers kick), 5:15. Texans 31–10. Drive: 3 plays, 45 yards, 1:46.

Leading passers

- CIN – Andy Dalton – 27/42, 257 yards, 3 INT
- HOU – T. J. Yates – 11/20, 159 yards, TD

Leading rushers

- CIN – Brian Leonard – 3 rushes, 34 yards
- HOU – Arian Foster – 24 rushes, 153 yards, 2 TD

Leading receivers

- CIN – A. J. Green – 5 receptions, 47 yards
- HOU – Andre Johnson – 5 receptions, 90 yards, TD

In the first playoff game in Reliant Stadium (and the first NFL playoff game played in Houston since 1993), Houston's defense forced four sacks and intercepted three passes, while their offense racked up 188 rushing yards en route to the team's first playoff win since the team's founding in 2002. For the Bengals, it marked their fourth consecutive playoff loss since 1990 and extended their playoff win drought to 21 years, the longest streak among all NFL teams.

In the first quarter, a 52-yard pass interference penalty against Texans cornerback Glover Quin while trying to cover A. J. Green gave the Bengals a first down at the Houston 24-yard line. Then facing third down and seven, backup tailback Brian Leonard ran a screen pass 16 yards to the 1-yard line, where Cedric Benson ran the ball into the end zone on the next play, giving Cincinnati a 7–0 lead. Houston struck back with a 6-play, 80-yard scoring drive. The key player on the drive was running back Arian Foster, who rushed five times for 44 yards, the last carry an 8-yard touchdown run to tie the game.

In the second quarter, Cincinnati drove to the Texans 23-yard line. But on third down, quarterback Andy Dalton was sacked for a 9-yard loss by linebacker Brooks Reed, and then Mike Nugent missed a 50-yard field goal attempt. On the Bengals next drive, Dalton's 36-yard completion to reserve tight end Donald Lee and a 15-yard penalty against Houston at the end of the play set up Nugent's 37-yard field goal to make the score 10–7. Houston countered with T. J. Yates completing four passes for 38 yards on a 59-yard drive that ended with Neil Rackers' 39-yard field goal. Then with just 52 seconds left in the half, rookie defensive end J. J. Watt intercepted a pass from Dalton at the line of scrimmage and returned it 29 yards for a touchdown to give the Texans a 17–10 halftime lead.

In the second half, Houston completely took over the game. After the first three drives ended in punts, Yates completed two passes to Foster for 27 yards before tossing a 40-yard touchdown pass to Andre Johnson. On the Bengals next possession, they moved the ball to the Texans 47-yard line. But on fourth down and 3, Dalton's pass was intercepted by former Bengal Johnathan Joseph. Then in the fourth quarter, Houston put the game completely out of reach with an interception by Danieal Manning that set up Foster's 42-yard touchdown run, increasing their lead to 31–10 with just over five minutes left in regulation.

Foster finished the game with 153 rushing yards, three receptions for 29 yards, and two touchdowns. He became the third undrafted player in NFL history ever to rush for over 100 yards in a playoff game, after Paul Lowe and Ryan Grant.

The attendance of 71,725 was a record crowd for a football game at Reliant Stadium; in 2009, WrestleMania 25 was attended by 72,744 fans. The Bengals extended their current playoff losing streak to four, dating back to the divisional round loss against the Los Angeles Raiders in January 1991. This was the first game in playoff history ever to feature a starting rookie quarterback for each team.

==== NFC: New Orleans Saints 45, Detroit Lions 28 ====
Detroit Lions vs. New Orleans Saints – Game summary

Quarter	1	2	3	4	Total
Lions	7	7	7	7	28
Saints	0	10	14	21	45

at Mercedes-Benz Superdome, New Orleans, Louisiana

- Date: January 7
- Game time: 8:00 p.m. EST/7:00 p.m. CST
- Game weather: Played indoors, domed stadium
- Game attendance: 73,038
- Referee: Tony Corrente
- TV announcers (NBC): Al Michaels (play-by-play), Cris Collinsworth (color commentator), and Michele Tafoya (sideline reporter)
- Recap

Game information

1st quarter

- DET – Will Heller 10-yard pass from Matthew Stafford (Jason Hanson kick), 10:58. Lions 7–0. Drive: 8 plays, 80 yards, 4:02.

2nd quarter

- NO – Darren Sproles 2-yard run (John Kasay kick), 14:01. Tied 7–7. Drive: 11 plays, 89 yards, 5:19.
- DET – Calvin Johnson 13-yard pass from Matthew Stafford (Jason Hanson kick), 9:11. Lions 14–7. Drive 9 plays, 87 yards, 4:50.
- NO – John Kasay 24-yard field goal, 0:00. Lions 14–10. Drive 14 plays, 78 yards, 5:03.

3rd quarter

- NO – Devery Henderson 41-yard pass from Drew Brees (John Kasay kick), 13:09. Saints 17–14. Drive: 4 plays, 78 yards, 1:51.
- NO – Jimmy Graham 3-yard pass from Drew Brees (John Kasay kick), 4:03. Saints 24–14. Drive: 13 plays, 92 yards, 6:27.
- DET – Matthew Stafford 1-yard run (Jason Hanson kick), 1:08. Saints 24–21. Drive 8 plays, 80 yards, 2:55.

4th quarter

- NO – Darren Sproles 17-yard run (John Kasay kick), 9:53. Saints 31–21. Drive: 14 plays, 80 yards, 6:15.
- NO – Robert Meachem 56-yard pass from Drew Brees (John Kasay kick), 7:29. Saints 38–21. Drive: 4 plays, 61 yards, 2:14.
- DET – Calvin Johnson 12-yard pass from Matthew Stafford (Jason Hanson kick), 4:40. Saints 38–28. Drive 9 plays, 79 yards, 2:49.
- NO – Pierre Thomas 1-yard run (John Kasay kick), 3:36. Saints 45–28. Drive: 4 plays, 44 yards, 1:04.

Leading passers

- DET – Matthew Stafford – 28/43, 380 yards, 3 TD, 2 INT
- NO – Drew Brees – 33/43, 466 yards, 3 TD

Leading rushers

- DET – Kevin Smith – 6 rushes, 21 yards
- NO – Pierre Thomas – 8 rushes, 66 yards, TD

Leading receivers

- DET – Calvin Johnson – 12 receptions, 211 yards, 2 TD
- NO – Marques Colston – 7 receptions, 120 yards

New Orleans never punted the ball, gained a postseason record 626 yards, converted three fourth downs, and scored 35 points in the second half to defeat the Lions, who were playing their first playoff game in twelve years.

Detroit quarterback Matthew Stafford completed five of six passes for 70 yards on the opening drive of the game, the last one a 10-yard touchdown pass to tight end Will Heller. Later on, a 31-yard burst by Saints running back Pierre Thomas set up Darren Sproles' 2-yard touchdown run, tying the score early in the second quarter.

Detroit responded on their next drive, moving the ball 87 yards in nine plays and taking a 14–7 lead on Stafford's 13-yard touchdown pass to Calvin Johnson. With 21 seconds left in the half, New Orleans appeared to score the tying touchdown on a pass from Drew Brees to receiver Marques Colston, but the catch was overturned by official review, and the Saints ended up settling for a John Kasay field goal to cut the score to 14–10 at the end of the half.

The Saints dominated the second half, scoring touchdowns on five consecutive possessions before ending the game on their sixth. On the first play of the third quarter, Thomas rushed for 18 yards. Running back Chris Ivory then added a 19-yard run before Brees finished the drive with a 41-yard touchdown pass to Devery Henderson. Then after a Lions punt, New Orleans drove 92 yards, featuring a 40-yard completion from Brees to Henderson, and scored with his 3-yard touchdown pass to tight end Jimmy Graham.

This time Detroit stormed back, with Stafford completing two passes to Johnson for 63 yards before rushing the ball into the end zone himself on a 1-yard run, making the score 24–21. But their defense still could not stop Brees, who completed five passes for 52 yards on a 78-yard drive that ended with Sproles' second touchdown on a 17-yard run. Then on the first play of the Lions' next drive, Jabari Greer intercepted Stafford's pass at the New Orleans 39-yard line. Four plays later, Brees converted the turnover with a 56-yard touchdown pass to Robert Meachem. This time, Detroit managed to respond, with Johnson catching three passes for 38 yards on a 79-yard drive, the last one a 12-yard score. But New Orleans recovered Jason Hanson's onside kick attempt and stormed back for another touchdown, with Meachem's 41-yard reception setting up Thomas' 1-yard scoring run. Then the Saints sealed the victory with Greer's second interception from Stafford, enabling them to run out the rest of the clock.

Brees completed 33 of 43 passes for a franchise postseason record 466 yards and three touchdowns. Meachem and Colston both recorded over 100 receiving yards each, while Thomas and Sproles combined for 264 all-purpose yards and three touchdowns between them.

Stafford threw for 380 yards and three touchdowns, with two interceptions, while Johnson set franchise playoff records with 12 receptions for 211 yards and two scores.

With the victory the Saints ran their home playoff winning streak to five dating back to their 2000 victory over the St. Louis Rams, which was also the first playoff win in their history. The Lions continued their streak of playoff futility, having only one playoff win – their divisional playoff win over the Dallas Cowboys in January 1992 – in their history since the AFL–NFL merger. This streak ended in 2023.

This was the first postseason meeting between the Lions and Saints.

=== Sunday, January 8, 2012 ===
==== NFC: New York Giants 24, Atlanta Falcons 2 ====
Atlanta Falcons vs. New York Giants – Game summary

Quarter	1	2	3	4	Total
Falcons	0	2	0	0	2
Giants	0	7	10	7	24

at MetLife Stadium, East Rutherford, New Jersey

- Date: January 8
- Game time: 1:00 p.m. EST
- Game weather: 44 °F (7 °C), partly cloudy
- Game attendance: 79,909
- Referee: Carl Cheffers
- TV announcers (Fox): Joe Buck (play-by-play), Troy Aikman (color commentator), Pam Oliver, and Chris Myers (sideline reporters)
- Recap

Game information

1st quarter

- None

2nd quarter

- ATL – Intentional Grounding Penalty on Giants quarterback Eli Manning in the endzone for a safety, 13:44. Falcons 2–0.
- NYG – Hakeem Nicks 4-yard pass from Eli Manning (Lawrence Tynes kick), 2:47. Giants 7–2. Drive: 13 plays, 85 yards, 7:32

3rd quarter

- NYG – Lawrence Tynes 22-yard field goal, 7:51. Giants 10–2. Drive: 11 plays, 72 yards, 4:47
- NYG – Hakeem Nicks 72-yard pass from Eli Manning (Lawrence Tynes kick), 2:44. Giants 17–2. Drive: 3 plays, 79 yards, 1:32

4th quarter

- NYG – Mario Manningham 27-yard pass from Eli Manning (Lawrence Tynes kick), 9:55. Giants 24–2. Drive: 10 plays, 85 yards, 5:38

Leading passers

- ATL – Matt Ryan – 24/41, 199 yards
- NYG – Eli Manning – 23/32, 277 yards, 3 TD

Leading rushers

- ATL – Michael Turner – 15 rushes, 41 yards
- NYG – Brandon Jacobs – 14 rushes, 92 yards

Leading receivers

- ATL – Julio Jones – 7 receptions, 64 yards
- NYG – Hakeem Nicks – 6 receptions, 115 yards, 2 TD

New York shut out Atlanta's offense, outgaining them in total yards 442–247, while also limiting them to 4/14 on third down conversions and 0/3 on fourth down attempts resulting in a dominating win in their only playoff game to date at MetLife Stadium.

Both teams combined for just one first down over their first five possessions. Eventually, Atlanta managed to sustain a drive, but on the first play of the second quarter, quarterback Matt Ryan was stuffed for no gain on fourth down and one on the Giants 24-yard line. Two plays later, New York quarterback Eli Manning gave Atlanta the first points of the game by committing intentional grounding in the end zone, resulting in a safety that made the score 2–0. After forcing a punt, New York earned their first score with an 85-yard drive, featuring a 34-yard run by Brandon Jacobs, that ended with Manning's 4-yard touchdown pass to Hakeem Nicks, giving them a 7–2 lead.

In the second half, a 30-yard run by Giants running back Ahmad Bradshaw set up a field goal by Lawrence Tynes. Atlanta responded with a drive to the New York 21-yard line, but once again they came up empty when Ryan was tackled for no gain on fourth and one for a second time. A few plays later, New York increased their lead to 17–2 with Manning's 72-yard touchdown completion to Nicks. In the fourth quarter, Manning threw his third touchdown pass, a 29-yarder to Mario Manningham. Meanwhile, all that lay in store for Atlanta were more punts and their third failed fourth down conversion attempt of the day.

Manning threw for 277 yards and three touchdowns with no interceptions, while Jacobs added 100 all-purpose yards. Nicks caught six passes for 115 yards and two scores.

The win marked New York's first playoff win since their victory in Super Bowl XLII and their first home playoff win since their victory in the 2000 NFC Championship Game; they were defeated in the 2005–06 playoffs by the Carolina Panthers in the wild card round and lost in the divisional playoffs to the Philadelphia Eagles in the 2008 season after clinching the No. 1 seed in the NFC. Atlanta's playoff losing streak reached four games with the loss. It was the first playoff game an offense was shut out since the Giants were shut out by the Carolina Panthers in 2005.

This game was also notable for the fact that it was the first game in NFL postseason history in which a safety was the only score awarded to a team.

This was the first postseason meeting between the Falcons and Giants.

==== AFC: Denver Broncos 29, Pittsburgh Steelers 23 (OT) ====
Pittsburgh Steelers vs. Denver Broncos – Game summary

Quarter	1	2	3	4	OT	Total
Steelers	6	0	7	10	0	23
Broncos	0	20	0	3	6	29

at Sports Authority Field at Mile High, Denver, Colorado

- Date: January 8
- Game time: 4:30 p.m. EST/2:30 p.m. MST
- Game weather: 40 °F (4 °C), sunny
- Game attendance: 75,970
- Referee: Ron Winter
- TV announcers (CBS): Jim Nantz (play-by-play) and Phil Simms (color commentator)
- Recap

Game information

1st quarter

- PIT – Shaun Suisham 45-yard field goal, 11:14. Steelers 3–0. Drive: 8 plays, 53 yards, 3:46
- PIT – Shaun Suisham 38-yard field goal, 0:23. Steelers 6–0. Drive: 12 plays, 47 yards, 5:50

2nd quarter

- DEN – Eddie Royal 30-yard pass from Tim Tebow (Matt Prater kick), 13:24. Broncos 7–6. Drive: 5 plays, 80 yards, 1:59
- DEN – Tim Tebow 8-yard run (Matt Prater kick), 10:36. Broncos 14–6. Drive: 4 plays, 73 yards, 2:18
- DEN – Matt Prater 20-yard field goal, 7:30. Broncos 17–6. Drive: 4 plays, 16 yards, 1:44
- DEN – Matt Prater 28-yard field goal, 1:05. Broncos 20–6. Drive: 8 plays, 59 yards, 4:04

3rd quarter

- PIT – Mike Wallace 1-yard run (Shaun Suisham kick), 4:29. Broncos 20–13. Drive: 11 plays, 87 yards, 5:56

4th quarter

- DEN – Matt Prater 35-yard field goal, 13:10. Broncos 23–13. Drive: 12 plays, 63 yards, 6:19
- PIT – Shaun Suisham 37-yard field goal, 9:59. Broncos 23–16. Drive: 7 plays, 61 yards, 3:11
- PIT – Jerricho Cotchery 31-yard pass from Ben Roethlisberger (Shaun Suisham kick), 3:48. Tied 23–23. Drive: 7 plays, 55 yards, 3:47

Overtime

- DEN – Demaryius Thomas 80-yard pass from Tim Tebow, 14:49. Broncos 29–23. Drive: 1 play, 80 yards, 0:11

Leading passers

- PIT – Ben Roethlisberger – 22/40, 289 yards, TD, INT
- DEN – Tim Tebow – 10/21, 316 yards, 2 TD

Leading rushers

- PIT – Isaac Redman – 17 rushes, 121 yards
- DEN – Willis McGahee – 19 rushes, 61 yards

Leading receivers

- PIT – Emmanuel Sanders – 6 receptions, 81 yards
- DEN – Demaryius Thomas – 4 receptions, 204 yards, TD

This game was the first one ever played under the league's new overtime rules, in which winning would be more difficult for the team that won the coin toss because the game would not end on an opening field goal. It did not matter, as it took Denver just one play to win with Tim Tebow's 80-yard touchdown pass to Demaryius Thomas.

Pittsburgh scored on their opening drive, with Ben Roethlisberger's 33-yard completion to tight end Heath Miller setting up a 45-yard field goal by Shaun Suisham. Later in the quarter, Steelers running back Isaac Redman rushed five times for 33 yards on a 47-yard drive that ended with Suisham's 38-yard field goal, increasing the score to 6–0.

But Denver, which gained just eight yards in the first quarter, suddenly exploded with offensive production in the second. On their first drive of the quarter, Tebow completed a 51-yard strike to Thomas. Then he followed it up with a 30-yard touchdown pass to Eddie Royal. Following a Pittsburgh punt, Tebow's 58-yard completion to Thomas set up his own touchdown on an 8-yard run, giving the Broncos a 14–6 lead. An interception by Quinton Carter quickly led to a 20-yard field goal from Matt Prater, and before the end of the half, Prater added one more, the second set up by Tebow's 41-yard completion to tight end Daniel Fells. With time running out in the quarter, Roethlisberger completed a 25-yard pass to Antonio Brown and an 18-yarder to Emmanuel Sanders on a drive that advanced to the Broncos 32-yard line. But on third down, a fumbled snap resulted in a 23-yard loss, pushing the team out of field goal range.

Pittsburgh regrouped in the second half. After its defense forced a punt, Roethlisberger completed an 18-yard pass to Sanders and Redman broke off a 32-yard run on the way to a 1-yard touchdown run by receiver Mike Wallace on an end-around play, cutting the score to 20–13. Denver struck back with their third field goal from Prater, aided by a 32-yard pass interference penalty on Ike Taylor, but Pittsburgh responded with their own field goal-drive, featuring a 28-yard run by Redman, making it a one-score game at 23–16.

With 7:35 left in regulation, Denver running back Willis McGahee lost a fumble while being tackled by Ryan Mundy, and linebacker LaMarr Woodley recovered it at the Steelers 45-yard line. Though Roethlisberger was sacked on the first play, he recovered with a 15-yard completion to Sanders and a 6-yard run before tying the game with a 31-yard touchdown completion to Jerricho Cotchery. Both teams had one more drive to attempt a winning score, but Denver could go no further than their own 35-yard line, while Roethlisberger was sacked twice on his drive as time expired in the fourth quarter.

Following a touchback on the opening kickoff, Pittsburgh anticipated that Denver would take to the ground, so the Steelers defense put all 11 players within six yards of the line of scrimmage. But Tebow hit Thomas in stride on a slant pattern across the middle of the field, and he took the ball 80 yards to the end zone for the game-winning score.

Tebow completed only 10 of 21 passes, but threw for 316 yards and two touchdowns without any interceptions, and added 50 yards and a touchdown on the ground, and also set a franchise record for passer rating in a playoff game, with 125.5. Thomas had 204 yards and a touchdown on just four receptions, an average of 51 yards per catch. Defensive end Robert Ayers had two sacks. For the Steelers, Redman finished with a career-high 121 rushing yards.

Many observers have pointed out the symbolism of Tebow's 316 passing yards in comparison to the Biblical passage of John 3:16. Tebow – known for his strong religious beliefs – had the number in black under his eyes when he led the Florida Gators in winning the 2009 BCS National Championship Game, which was played exactly three years to the day before this playoff game. Additionally, he set a playoff record by averaging 31.6 yards per completion. The only interception of the game was thrown by Roethlisberger on third down and 16. The Nielsen ratings for the game also peaked at 31.6. Pittsburgh's time of possession was 31:06. In addition, Thomas, who caught the winning touchdown pass in overtime, was born on Christmas Day in 1987.

Denver won its first playoff game at home since defeating the New England Patriots in the 2005 playoffs, with their next game seeing them lose to the same Steelers. Pittsburgh failed to advance past the first round of the playoffs for the first time since 2007, after winning the AFC Championship Game the year prior.

This was the seventh postseason meeting between the Steelers and Broncos. Both teams split the first six meetings. Pittsburgh won the most recent meeting 34–17 in the 2005 AFC Championship Game.

== Divisional round ==
=== Saturday, January 14, 2012 ===
==== NFC: San Francisco 49ers 36, New Orleans Saints 32 ====
New Orleans Saints vs. San Francisco 49ers – Game summary

Quarter	1	2	3	4	Total
Saints	0	14	0	18	32
49ers	14	3	3	16	36

at Candlestick Park, San Francisco, California

- Date: January 14
- Game time: 4:30 p.m. EST/1:30 p.m. PST
- Game weather: 62 °F (17 °C), sunny
- Game attendance: 69,732
- Referee: John Parry
- TV announcers (Fox): Kenny Albert (play-by-play), Daryl Johnston (color commentator), and Tony Siragusa (sideline reporter)
- Recap

Game information

1st quarter

- SF – Vernon Davis 49-yard pass from Alex Smith (David Akers kick), 2:08. 49ers 7–0. Drive: 2 plays, 54 yards, 0:46
- SF – Michael Crabtree 4-yard pass from Alex Smith (David Akers kick), 0:41. 49ers 14–0. Drive: 3 plays, 4 yards, 0:15

2nd quarter

- SF – David Akers 25-yard field goal, 14:12. 49ers 17–0. Drive: 4 plays, 6 yards, 1:23
- NO – Jimmy Graham 14-yard pass from Drew Brees (John Kasay kick), 9:32. 49ers 17–7. Drive: 9 plays, 80 yards, 4:40
- NO – Marques Colston 25-yard pass from Drew Brees (John Kasay kick), 4:09. 49ers 17–14. Drive: 7 plays, 66 yards, 3:04

3rd quarter

- SF – David Akers 41-yard field goal, 10:36. 49ers 20–14. Drive: 4 plays, 3 yards, 0:59

4th quarter

- NO – John Kasay 48-yard field goal, 13:08. 49ers 20–17. Drive: 9 plays, 37 yards, 3:26
- SF – David Akers 37-yard field goal, 7:36. 49ers 23–17. Drive: 5 plays, 45 yards, 3:02
- NO – Darren Sproles 44-yard pass from Drew Brees (John Kasay kick), 4:02. Saints 24–23. Drive: 9 plays, 79 yards, 3:34
- SF – Alex Smith 28-yard run (Frank Gore run failed), 2:11. 49ers 29–24. Drive: 6 plays, 80 yards, 1:51
- NO – Jimmy Graham 66-yard pass from Drew Brees (Drew Brees–Darren Sproles pass), 1:37. Saints 32–29. Drive: 4 plays, 88 yards, 0:34
- SF – Vernon Davis 14-yard pass from Alex Smith (David Akers kick), 0:09. 49ers 36–32. Drive: 7 plays, 85 yards, 1:28

Leading passers

- NO – Drew Brees – 40/63, 462 yards, 4 TD, 2 INT
- SF – Alex Smith – 24/42, 299 yards, 3 TD

Leading rushers

- NO – Chris Ivory – 9 rushes, 23 yards
- SF – Frank Gore – 13 rushes, 89 yards

Leading receivers

- NO – Marques Colston – 9 receptions, 136 yards, TD
- SF – Vernon Davis – 7 receptions, 180 yards, 2 TD

Alex Smith's 14-yard touchdown pass to tight end Vernon Davis with nine seconds left gave San Francisco their first playoff win since 2002 at the end of a wild, back and forth final quarter which featured four lead changes in a span of 3:53.

New Orleans started off the game with a 78-yard drive to the 49ers 2-yard line, but came up empty when Donte Whitner forced a fumble from Pierre Thomas that was recovered by linebacker Patrick Willis. Thomas was injured on the play and did not return. Later on, San Francisco opened up the scoring with Smith's 49-yard touchdown pass to Davis. A few plays into the next drive, Dashon Goldson intercepted a pass from Saints quarterback Drew Brees and returned it 41 yards to the 4-yard line, setting up Smith's touchdown completion to Michael Crabtree and giving the 49ers a 14–0 lead. Then Courtney Roby lost a fumble on the kickoff that San Francisco linebacker Blake Costanzo recovered on the Saints 13-yard line. This time New Orleans managed to keep them out of the end zone, but David Akers kicked a field goal to give the 49ers a 17–0 lead less than a minute into the second quarter.

Brees led the Saints back, completing seven consecutive passes for 65 yards and rushing for five on an 80-yard drive that ended with his 14-yard scoring pass to tight end Jimmy Graham. Then after a punt, he threw a 25-yard touchdown completion to Marques Colston, cutting the deficit to three points. Later on, Brees threw his second interception, this one to Tarell Brown, but San Francisco could not convert and the score remained 17–14 at the end of the second quarter, despite four Saints turnovers.

Early in the second half, Costanzo forced a fumble from Darren Sproles on a punt return and Colin Jones recovered it, leading to Akers' second field goal. In the fourth quarter, the Saints managed to close the gap back to three points with a franchise postseason record 48-yard field goal from John Kasay. But a 42-yard run from San Francisco's Frank Gore helped put the margin back up to six on Akers' third field goal of the day.

With 4:02 left in the game, New Orleans took their first lead of the game at 24–23 with Brees' 44-yard touchdown pass to Sproles. But it lasted less than two minutes before San Francisco took it back, with Smith hitting Davis for a 37-yard gain before taking the ball into the end zone himself on his career long 28-yard run, making the score 29–24 after the two-point conversion failed. Not to be outdone, Brees matched the score with his fourth touchdown pass of the day, a 66-yard completion to Graham, and then threw the ball to Sproles for a successful 2-point conversion, giving the Saints a 32–29 lead.

San Francisco got the ball back on their own 15-yard line with 1:37 left in the game. Smith started the drive with two completions to Gore for 18 yards. Then after an incompletion, he connected on a 47-yard pass to Davis, advancing the ball to the Saints 20-yard line. A 6-yard completion to Gore then moved the ball to the 14, where Smith spiked the ball to stop the clock. On the next play, he threw a 14-yard touchdown pass to Davis with nine seconds left, who managed to hang onto the ball despite a hard hit from Roman Harper while he was still in mid-air, earning San Francisco their first conference championship game since 1997.

Smith threw for 299 yards and three touchdowns without an interception, while adding 28 yards and a touchdown on the ground. He was the first quarterback in NFL playoff history to lead two go-ahead touchdowns in the final three minutes of a game. Davis caught seven passes for 180 yards and two touchdowns, breaking Kellen Winslow's NFL postseason record for receiving yards (166) by a tight end. Gore rushed for 89 yards and caught seven passes for 38. For the Saints, Brees completed 40 of 63 passes for 462 yards and four touchdowns, with two interceptions. His top target was Sproles, who caught an NFL playoff record 15 passes for 119 yards and a touchdown, while adding 59 more yards on rushing and special teams returns. Graham caught five passes for 103 yards and two touchdowns, while Colston caught nine passes for 136 yards and one score.

Davis' game-winning touchdown catch occurred four days after the 30th anniversary of The Catch – Joe Montana's touchdown pass to Dwight Clark in the 1981 NFC Championship against the Cowboys – known as the most famous play in 49ers history. San Francisco had another famous playoff win in the 1998 Wild Card round against the Packers on a last second touchdown pass from Steve Young to Terrell Owens known as The Catch II. Sports writers and 49ers fans dubbed Davis' catch as The Catch III, also considering that all three times, the 49ers were trailing with less than a minute to go at Candlestick Park and facing 3rd and 3. The league later seconded the moniker on social media.

This was the first postseason meeting between the Saints and 49ers.

In April 2012, leaked audio of a pre-game team meeting of Saints defensive coordinator Greg Williams from a day before the game that was captured by Sean Pamphilon showed that bounties where placed by the Saints to injure Alex Smith, Michael Crabtree, Vernon Davis, Kyle Williams, Frank Gore, and Kendall Hunter as a part of the New Orleans Saints bounty scandal.

==== AFC: New England Patriots 45, Denver Broncos 10 ====
Denver Broncos vs. New England Patriots – Game summary

Quarter	1	2	3	4	Total
Broncos	0	7	3	0	10
Patriots	14	21	7	3	45

at Gillette Stadium, Foxborough, Massachusetts

- Date: January 14
- Game time: 8:00 p.m. EST
- Game weather: 24 °F (−4 °C), partly cloudy and cold
- Game attendance: 68,756
- Referee: Gene Steratore
- TV announcers (CBS): Jim Nantz (play-by-play), Phil Simms (color commentator), and Steve Tasker (sideline reporter)
- Recap

Game information

1st quarter

- NE – Wes Welker 7-yard pass from Tom Brady (Stephen Gostkowski kick), 13:09. Patriots 7–0. Drive: 5 plays, 80 yards, 1:51
- NE – Rob Gronkowski 10-yard pass from Tom Brady (Stephen Gostkowski kick), 6:42. Patriots 14–0. Drive: 7 plays, 59 yards, 3:25

2nd quarter

- DEN – Willis McGahee 5-yard run (Matt Prater kick), 14:54. Patriots 14–7. Drive: 4 plays, 24 yards, 2:06
- NE – Rob Gronkowski 12-yard pass from Tom Brady (Stephen Gostkowski kick), 7:42. Patriots 21–7. Drive: 8 plays, 52 yards, 3:35
- NE – Deion Branch 61-yard pass from Tom Brady (Stephen Gostkowski kick), 1:57. Patriots 28–7. Drive: 2 plays, 72 yards, 0:30
- NE – Rob Gronkowski 19-yard pass from Tom Brady (Stephen Gostkowski kick), 0:05. Patriots 35–7. Drive: 5 plays, 58 yards, 1:04

3rd quarter

- NE – Aaron Hernandez 17-yard pass from Tom Brady (Stephen Gostkowski kick), 11:46. Patriots 42–7. Drive: 4 plays, 44 yards, 1:40
- DEN – Matt Prater 41-yard field goal, 2:14. Patriots 42–10. Drive: 14 plays, 58 yards, 6:16

4th quarter

- NE – Stephen Gostkowski 20-yard field goal, 12:39. Patriots 45–10. Drive: 11 plays, 78 yards, 4:35

Leading passers

- DEN – Tim Tebow – 9/26, 136 yards
- NE – Tom Brady – 26/34, 363 yards, 6 TD, INT

Leading rushers

- DEN – Willis McGahee – 17 rushes, 76 yards, TD
- NE – Aaron Hernandez – 5 rushes, 61 yards

Leading receivers

- DEN – Demaryius Thomas – 6 receptions, 93 yards
- NE – Rob Gronkowski – 10 receptions, 145 yards, 3 TD

New England quarterback Tom Brady completed 18 of 25 passes for 246 yards and a postseason record five touchdowns in the first half as the Patriots dominated the game the whole way through, setting new franchise postseason records for total yards (509), points (45), and margin of victory (35). Brady finished with six touchdown passes, while Denver quarterback Tim Tebow completed just nine of 26 passes, and the Denver offense had 14 plays that lost yardage.

New England scored on their opening drive, moving the ball 80 yards in five plays, including a 43-yard run by Aaron Hernandez, before finishing it off with Brady's 7-yard touchdown pass to Wes Welker. Denver responded with a drive to the Patriots 37-yard line, but Tebow lost a fumble while being sacked by Rob Ninkovich, and New England linebacker Brandon Spikes recovered it. Brady went right back to work, completing five consecutive passes for 47 yards on the way to a 10-yard touchdown toss to Rob Gronkowski.

After a punt, Quinton Carter intercepted a pass from Brady and returned it 17 yards to the New England 24-yard line. On the last play of the quarter, Tebow kept the drive going with a 12-yard completion to Demaryius Thomas on third and 3, and then Willis McGahee ran the ball into the end zone from five yards out, cutting the score to 14–7.

However, this would be the closest scoring margin the Broncos would reach for the rest of the game. At the end of New England's next drive, Zoltan Mesko's 40-yard punt pinned Denver back at their own 5-yard line. After a three and out, the Patriots got the ball back with great field position at their own 48. Brady then completed four consecutive passes for 41 yards, the last one a 12-yard touchdown pass to Gronkowski. Later in the quarter, New England increased their lead to 28–7 on Brady's 61-yard touchdown completion to Deion Branch. And after forcing a punt, Brady threw a 20-yard completion to Hernandez, and an 11-yarder to Julian Edelman on the way to his 19-yard touchdown pass to Gronkowski, increasing the lead to 35–7 with just five seconds left in the half.

The second half didn't get any better for the Broncos. New England forced a punt on the first drive, which Edelman returned 15 yards to the Broncos 42-yard line. Five plays later, Brady tied a playoff record with his sixth touchdown pass of the day, a 17-yarder to Hernandez. Denver responded with Tebow completing an 18-yard pass to Matt Willis and a 15-yard pass to Eddie Royal on fourth down and 3. However, New England halted the drive at their 24-yard line, forcing them to settle for a 41-yard field goal by Matt Prater. In the fourth quarter, Brady completed two passes to Gronkowski for 48 yards to set up the last score of the day, a 20-yard field goal from Stephen Gostkowski making the final score 45–10, New England's first playoff victory since the 2007 AFC Championship Game.

Brady completed 26 of 34 passes for 363 yards and six touchdowns. Gronkowski caught 10 of those passes for 145 yards and tied a playoff record with three touchdown receptions. Ninkovich had four solo tackles, 1.5 sacks, and a forced fumble. McGahee was the top rusher of the game with 76 yards and a touchdown, while Thomas was Denver's top receiver with six receptions for 93 yards, including a 41-yard catch in the fourth quarter. The Broncos also gave up a postseason record of 16 negative yardage plays from the line of scrimmage.

This was the third postseason meeting between the Broncos and Patriots. Denver won both previous meetings, including handing Tom Brady his first playoff loss 27–13 in the 2005 AFC Divisional playoffs.

=== Sunday, January 15, 2012 ===
==== AFC: Baltimore Ravens 20, Houston Texans 13 ====
Houston Texans vs. Baltimore Ravens – Game summary

Quarter	1	2	3	4	Total
Texans	3	10	0	0	13
Ravens	17	0	0	3	20

at M&T Bank Stadium, Baltimore, Maryland

- Date: January 15
- Game time: 1:00 p.m. EST
- Game weather: 31 °F (−1 °C), sunny
- Game attendance: 71,547
- Referee: Pete Morelli
- TV announcers (CBS): Greg Gumbel (play-by-play) and Dan Dierdorf (color commentator)
- Recap

Game information

1st quarter

- HOU – Neil Rackers 40-yard field goal, 12:24. Texans 3–0. Drive: 5 plays, 20 yards, 2:36
- BAL – Kris Wilson 1-yard pass from Joe Flacco (Billy Cundiff kick), 9:51. Ravens 7–3. Drive: 3 plays, 2 yards, 1:21
- BAL – Billy Cundiff 48-yard field goal, 6:02. Ravens 10–3. Drive: 6 plays, 30 yards, 2:47
- BAL – Anquan Boldin 10-yard pass from Joe Flacco (Billy Cundiff kick), 1:08. Ravens 17–3. Drive: 5 plays, 34 yards, 2:05

2nd quarter

- HOU – Neil Rackers 33-yard field goal, 11:42. Ravens 17–6. Drive: 11 plays, 59 yards, 4:26
- HOU – Arian Foster 1-yard run (Neil Rackers kick), 4:48. Ravens 17–13. Drive: 12 plays, 86 yards, 5:49

3rd quarter

- None

4th quarter

- BAL – Billy Cundiff 44-yard field goal, 2:52. Ravens 20–13. Drive: 10 plays, 45 yards, 4:29

Leading passers

- HOU – T. J. Yates – 17/35, 184 yards, 3 INT
- BAL – Joe Flacco – 14/27, 176 yards, 2 TD

Leading rushers

- HOU – Arian Foster – 27 rushes, 132 yards, TD
- BAL – Ray Rice – 21 rushes, 60 yards

Leading receivers

- HOU – Andre Johnson – 8 receptions, 111 yards
- BAL – Anquan Boldin – 4 receptions, 73 yards, TD

Despite gaining 227 yards, Baltimore's defense forced four turnovers, which included Ed Reed's clutch interception on his own 4-yard line with less than two minutes left, to win the game and send the Ravens into their third AFC Championship Game in franchise history.

Houston's Danieal Manning returned the opening kickoff 60 yards to the Ravens 41-yard line, setting up a field goal by Neil Rackers. Their defense quickly forced a punt, but returner Jacoby Jones fumbled the ball and cornerback Jimmy Smith recovered for Baltimore on the Texans 2-yard line. Two plays later, Joe Flacco put the Ravens on the board with a 1-yard touchdown pass to Kris Wilson, Wilson's first reception of the year. Then after forcing a punt, Flacco's 21-yard completion to Anquan Boldin set up a 48-yard field goal from Billy Cundiff, making the score 10–3. Later in the quarter, Baltimore cornerback Lardarius Webb intercepted a pass from T. J. Yates at the Houston 34-yard line. On third down and 9, Ray Rice kept the drive going with a 20-yard gain on a screen pass, and Flacco ended up finishing it off with a 10-yard touchdown pass to Boldin.

In the second quarter, Houston managed to fight back. First, Arian Foster rushed three times for 29 yards and caught a pass for 16 on a 59-yard drive that ended with Rackers' second field goal, cutting the score to 17–6. Then after a punt, Foster rushed for 53 yards, including a 28-yard burst on the first play, on a 12-play, 86-yard drive that consumed just 5:46 and ended with his 1-yard touchdown run, making the score 17–13. Baltimore responded with a drive to the Texans 33-yard line. But on third down, J. J. Watt sacked Flacco for a 9-yard loss, pushing the Ravens out of field goal range.

On Houston's first drive of the second half, Yates completed a 17-yard pass to Andre Johnson and a 19-yarder to Kevin Walter, moving the ball to the Ravens 32-yard line. But Baltimore halted the drive there and Rackers missed a 50-yard field goal try. The Ravens then took the ball back and drove all the way to the Texans 1-yard line, but Rice was stuffed for no gain by Tim Dobbins on fourth down – Dobbins' only tackle of the game – and they failed to score.

Midway through the fourth quarter, Webb recorded his second interception of the day on the Ravens 29-yard line, and Baltimore converted the turnover with a 44-yard field goal, taking a 7-point lead at 20–13. Yates responded with two completions to Johnson for 34 yards, moving the ball to the Ravens 38-yard line. But on the next play, Reed picked off a deep pass from Yates on his own 4-yard line with less than two minutes left in regulation. Houston still managed to force a punt with 45 seconds left, but the Ravens defense rose to the occasion once again, forcing a turnover on downs at their own 43-yard line.

Flacco threw for 176 yards and two touchdowns. Webb had four tackles and two interceptions. For Houston, Foster rushed for 132 yards and a touchdown, while also catching five passes for 22 yards. Johnson was the top receiver of the game with eight receptions for 111 yards. Watt had 12 total tackles (nine solo) and 2.5 sacks, while linebacker Brooks Reed had six solo tackles, 2.5 sacks, and a forced fumble.

This was Baltimore's first home playoff game since 2006, and their first home playoff win since 2000.

This was the first postseason meeting between the Texans and Ravens.

==== NFC: New York Giants 37, Green Bay Packers 20 ====
New York Giants vs. Green Bay Packers – Game summary

Quarter	1	2	3	4	Total
Giants	10	10	0	17	37
Packers	3	7	3	7	20

at Lambeau Field, Green Bay, Wisconsin

- Date: January 15
- Game time: 4:30 p.m. EST/3:30 p.m. CST
- Game weather: 31 °F (−1 °C), sunny
- Game attendance: 72,080
- Referee: Bill Leavy
- TV announcers (Fox): Joe Buck (play-by-play), Troy Aikman (color commentator), Pam Oliver, and Chris Myers (sideline reporters)
- Recap

Game information

1st quarter

- NYG – Lawrence Tynes 31-yard field goal, 8:33. Giants 3–0. Drive: 13 plays, 67 yards, 6:27
- GB – Mason Crosby 47-yard field goal, 5:33. Tied 3–3. Drive: 8 plays, 50 yards, 3:00
- NYG – Hakeem Nicks 66-yard pass from Eli Manning (Lawrence Tynes kick), 3:47. Giants 10–3. Drive: 4 plays, 80 yards, 1:46

2nd quarter

- GB – John Kuhn 8-yard pass from Aaron Rodgers (Mason Crosby kick), 14:54. Tied 10–10. Drive: 9 plays, 60 yards, 3:53
- NYG – Lawrence Tynes 23-yard field goal, 1:51. Giants 13–10. Drive: 5 plays, 29 yards, 1:46
- NYG – Hakeem Nicks 37-yard pass from Eli Manning (Lawrence Tynes kick), 0:00. Giants 20–10. Drive: 4 plays, 69 yards, 0:41

3rd quarter

- GB – Mason Crosby 35-yard field goal, 3:50. Giants 20–13. Drive: 10 plays, 58 yards, 4:58

4th quarter

- NYG – Lawrence Tynes 35-yard field goal, 7:48. Giants 23–13. Drive: 10 plays, 38 yards, 5:06
- NYG – 4-yard pass from Eli Manning (Lawrence Tynes kick), 6:48. Giants 30–13. Drive: 1 play, 4 yards, 0:05
- GB – Donald Driver 16-yard pass from Aaron Rodgers (Mason Crosby kick), 4:46. Giants 30–20. Drive: 8 plays, 76 yards, 2:02
- NYG – Brandon Jacobs 14-yard run (Lawrence Tynes kick), 2:36. Giants 37–20. Drive: 6 plays, 50 yards, 2:10

Leading passers

- NYG – Eli Manning – 21/33, 330 yards, 3 TD, INT
- GB – Aaron Rodgers – 26/46, 264 yards, 2 TD, INT

Leading rushers

- NYG – Ahmad Bradshaw – 12 rushes, 63 yards
- GB – Aaron Rodgers – 7 rushes, 66 yards

Leading receivers

- NYG – Hakeem Nicks – 7 receptions, 165 yards, 2 TD
- GB – Donald Driver – 3 receptions, 45 yards, TD

For the second consecutive year and for the fourth time in five seasons, the No. 1 seed in the NFC lost its opening game as New York topped Green Bay behind a career postseason high passing yardage day from Giants quarterback Eli Manning.

The Giants received the opening kickoff, and scored on the opening drive with a 31-yard field goal by kicker Lawrence Tynes. The Packers responded with a game-tying field goal on their opening drive, when their kicker Mason Crosby hit a 47-yard field goal. New York scored again on the following drive as Manning threw a 66-yard touchdown pass to receiver Hakeem Nicks.

Once again, the Packers responded on the following drive when Aaron Rodgers threw a touchdown pass to fullback John Kuhn on the first play of the second quarter. Green Bay was aided by a controversial call on the drive where receiver Greg Jennings was ruled down by contact on a play where replays showed that he had lost the ball, but after Giants coach Tom Coughlin challenged the call the play was upheld. Kuhn's touchdown tied the score at 10. Green Bay then attempted an onside kick to try and catch the Giants off guard, but New York recovered in Packer territory. However, on the drive that followed Tynes saw his 40-yard field goal attempt blocked.

New York recovered a fumble by Kuhn with 3:37 left in the half and on the first play of the ensuing drive Manning found Nicks for a 29-yard gain to the Green Bay five-yard line. The drive stalled afterward and Tynes kicked his second field goal of the game from 21 yards out. After forcing a Packers punt on their next drive, Manning and the Giants advanced into Packers territory on third down with a 23-yard run by Ahmad Bradshaw to put the ball at the Packers' 37. More importantly, Bradshaw was able to get out of bounds and stop the clock which gave the Giants four seconds to run one final play before the half. Manning then converted a Hail Mary pass in the end zone that was caught by Nicks, who secured the catch by holding the ball against his helmet in a play reminiscent of Manning's pass to David Tyree in Super Bowl XLII. The extra point made the score 20–10 in favor of New York at the half.

The Packers turned the ball over on their first drive of the second half after Rodgers was sacked by Osi Umenyiora and Deon Grant recovered the ball after Rodgers fumbled. However, Green Bay got the ball back after forcing a three-and-out and scored on the next drive when Crosby converted his second field goal. It was the last scoring play of the third quarter, as neither team was able to put a drive together for a score.

Green Bay moved into New York territory but the drive was stalled at the Giants' 39-yard line early in the fourth quarter. Coach Mike McCarthy elected to go for the first down on fourth and 5 but Rodgers was sacked by Michael Boley and the Packers turned the ball over on downs. The Giants scored on their possession with a third field goal by Tynes, this time from 35 yards. New York then capitalized on a fumble by Ryan Grant on the second play of the following drive as Chase Blackburn recovered and took the ball to the Packers' 4-yard line. Manning then zipped a touchdown pass to Mario Manningham on the first play of the new possession and gave the Giants a 30–13 lead.

New York appeared to have stopped the Packers' on a third down when Rodgers threw an incomplete pass to Donald Driver but Umenyiora was called for hitting Rodgers late and the Packers received a new set of downs. Six plays later Rodgers found Driver for a 16-yard touchdown to cut the Giants' lead to 30–20. However, they failed to recover the onside kick as Victor Cruz fell on the ball after Spencer Paysinger failed to control the kick from Crosby initially. It took New York six plays to score again when Brandon Jacobs ran it in from 14 yards out.

Trailing 37–20, the Packers took the field trying again to score as they had on their last drive. After hitting Jordy Nelson for an 11-yard gain on the first play Rodgers was then sacked by Umenyiora. After a short pass to James Starks that resulted in the loss of a yard Rodgers tried to throw to Jermichael Finley, but the pass was intercepted by Grant and the Giants ran out the clock from there.

With the victory the Giants advanced to their fifth NFC Championship Game and first since 2007, when they defeated the Packers to advance to the Super Bowl. Manning passed for a postseason career high 330 yards on 21-for-33 passing and three touchdowns. Nicks caught seven passes for 165 yards and two touchdowns while Cruz added five catches for 74 yards and Manningham caught three passes for 31 yards and one touchdown. In the defeat, Rodgers finished with 264 yards on 26-for-46 passing, two touchdowns, and an interception. Jennings led the Packers in receptions with four for 40 yards while Driver added three and led the team in receiving yards with 45. New York forced four turnovers (the interception and three fumbles) and sacked Rodgers four times.

Green Bay was playing in its first playoff game at home since the aforementioned 2007 NFC Championship Game and lost for the second consecutive time. The Packers became the first team to win at least fifteen games during the season and not advance beyond their first playoff game and became the fourth team after the 1998 Vikings, the 2004 Steelers, and the 2007 Patriots to win at least 15 games during the season and not win the Super Bowl. As previously mentioned, the Packers became the fourth team in five years – 2007 Cowboys, 2008 Giants, and 2010 Falcons – to get the NFC's top seed and lose their first playoff game. This was also the sixth consecutive year in which the defending Super Bowl champion failed to win a playoff game. The win by the Giants also was the first win by a road team in the 2011–12 NFL playoffs.

The Giants' win was their fifth consecutive away from home in the playoffs. Dating back to their 2007 Super Bowl season, the Giants played games in Raymond James Stadium, Texas Stadium, University of Phoenix Stadium, and Lambeau Field twice (including this game) and won each game.

This was the seventh postseason meeting between the Giants and Packers, with Green Bay having won four of the prior six meetings. New York won the last meeting 23–20 in overtime in the 2007 NFC Championship Game.

== Conference championships ==
=== Sunday, January 22, 2012 ===
==== AFC: New England Patriots 23, Baltimore Ravens 20 ====
Baltimore Ravens vs. New England Patriots – Game summary

Quarter	1	2	3	4	Total
Ravens	0	10	10	0	20
Patriots	3	10	3	7	23

at Gillette Stadium, Foxborough, Massachusetts

- Date: January 22
- Game time: 3:00 p.m. EST
- Game weather: 29 °F (−2 °C), cloudy and cold
- Game attendance: 68,756
- Referee: Alberto Riveron
- TV announcers (CBS): Jim Nantz (play-by-play), Phil Simms (color commentator), and Steve Tasker (sideline reporter)
- Recap

Game information

1st quarter

- NE – Stephen Gostkowski 29-yard field goal, 5:49. Patriots 3–0. Drive: 13 plays, 50 yards, 5:20

2nd quarter

- BAL – Billy Cundiff 20-yard field goal, 14:21. Tied 3–3. Drive: 8 plays, 67 yards, 4:20
- NE – BenJarvus Green-Ellis 7-yard run (Stephen Gostkowski kick), 10:35. Patriots 10–3. Drive: 10 plays, 75 yards, 3:46
- BAL – Dennis Pitta 6-yard pass from Joe Flacco (Billy Cundiff kick), 6:03. Tied 10–10. Drive: 8 plays, 80 yards, 4:32
- NE – Stephen Gostkowski 35-yard field goal, 3:00. Patriots 13–10. Drive: 10 plays, 63 yards, 3:03

3rd quarter

- NE – Stephen Gostkowski 24-yard field goal, 9:06. Patriots 16–10. Drive: 14 plays, 74 yards, 5:54
- BAL – Torrey Smith 29-yard pass from Joe Flacco (Billy Cundiff kick), 3:38. Ravens 17–16. Drive: 11 plays, 78 yards, 5:28
- BAL – Billy Cundiff 39-yard field goal, 0:50. Ravens 20–16. Drive: 6 plays, 7 yards, 2:36

4th quarter

- NE – Tom Brady 1-yard run (Stephen Gostkowski kick), 11:29. Patriots 23–20. Drive: 11 plays, 63 yards, 4:21

Leading passers

- BAL – Joe Flacco – 22/36, 306 yards, 2 TD, INT
- NE – Tom Brady – 22/36, 239 yards, 2 INT

Leading rushers

- BAL – Ray Rice – 21 rushes, 67 yards
- NE – BenJarvus Green-Ellis – 15 rushes, 68 yards, TD

Leading receivers

- BAL – Anquan Boldin – 6 receptions, 101 yards
- NE – Rob Gronkowski – 5 receptions, 87 yards

With New England clinging to a 23–20 lead near the end of the game, Patriots safety Sterling Moore broke up consecutive passes in and near his own end zone, forcing Baltimore to attempt a 32-yard field goal to send it into overtime. But Billy Cundiff's kick was wide left, earning New England their seventh Super Bowl appearance in franchise history.

After the game started with four punts, New England receiver Julian Edelman's 10-yard return gave his team good field position on their 39-yard line. The Patriots then drove to the Baltimore 11-yard line, aided by an illegal contact penalty on Lardarius Webb that wiped out an interception, and scored with Stephen Gostkowski's 29-yard field goal. New England quickly forced a punt, but Webb eventually intercepted a pass – for his third interception in two games – from Tom Brady on his own 30-yard line. On the next play, Joe Flacco's 42-yard completion to Torrey Smith moved the ball to the Patriots 28. However, New England's defense managed to halt the drive at the 3-yard line, where Cundiff kicked a field goal to tie the game.

In the second quarter, New England drove 75 yards to score the first touchdown of the game. The key player on the drive was running back BenJarvus Green-Ellis, who rushed five times for 33 yards and finished it off with a 7-yard touchdown run. Baltimore struck right back with an 80-yard scoring drive, with Flacco hitting Anquan Boldin for 37 yards and Lee Evans for 20 before finding tight end Dennis Pitta in the end zone to tie the game back up at 10. But New England retook the lead on their next drive, with Brady completing five of seven passes for 60 yards on the way to Gostkowski's second field goal, making the score 13–10 at the end of the half.

New England started off the second half with another long scoring drive, moving the ball 74 yards to the Ravens 6-yard line. But on third and two, Green-Ellis was tackled for no gain, so Gostkowski kicked his third field goal to give them a six-point lead. Later in the quarter, Baltimore took their first lead of the game, 17–16, on Flacco's 29-yard touchdown pass to Smith. Then Ravens receiver LaQuan Williams – a college teammate of Smith at the University of Maryland – forced a fumble from kick returner Danny Woodhead that Emanuel Cook recovered for Baltimore at the Pats 28-yard line, setting up Cundiff's second field goal to make the score 20–16.

Woodhead returned the ensuing kickoff 41 yards to the 37-yard line, and the Patriots offense took the ball to the end zone from there, featuring a 23-yard reception by tight end Rob Gronkowski. On fourth down on the Ravens 1-yard line, Brady took the snap and dove over a pile of players for a touchdown, giving New England a 23–20 lead. Late in the fourth quarter, Patriots linebacker Brandon Spikes picked off a pass from Flacco and returned it 19 yards to midfield. Brady tried to capitalize on the next play with a deep pass to the end zone, but Bernard Pollard deflected the ball and Jimmy Smith made a diving interception just before it hit the ground. Then he got back up and returned the ball to the Ravens 39-yard line. Baltimore subsequently drove to the Patriots 30-yard line, but on third and three, Vince Wilfork dropped Ray Rice for a 3-yard loss. Rather than attempt a 50-yard field goal, Baltimore decided to go for it on fourth down, but Flacco's pass was incomplete and the team turned the ball over.

The Ravens defense forced a punt with 1:44 left, giving them one last chance to tie or win the game. Three receptions by Boldin for 41 yards helped move the ball to the Patriots 13-yard line. But Moore made two critical pass deflections to keep them out of the end zone. First, Evans appeared to haul in a touchdown pass, but Moore knocked the ball out of his arms just before he held it long enough for a reception. Then on third down, he broke up a pass intended for Pitta at the 2-yard line. Cundiff then came onto the field to try a 32-yard field goal attempt which would have sent the game into overtime for the first time in an AFC Championship Game in 25 years (this didn't occur until the 2018 AFC Championship). However his kick was wide left, enabling New England to run out the rest of the clock.

Flacco threw for 306 yards and two touchdowns, with one interception. Boldin caught eight passes for 101 yards. Brady won his 16th postseason game as the Patriots quarterback, tying the NFL record held by Joe Montana. He also joined John Elway as one of the only quarterbacks ever to play in five Super Bowls.

The missed kick – and the fact that the football's laces were not out, as customary during placekicks – drew comparisons to the fictional kicker Ray Finkle from the 1994 film Ace Ventura: Pet Detective, who missed a similar short-range last-second kick in their version of Super Bowl XVII. The memory of Myra Kraft inspired the Patriots and some fans credited her intervention for the miss. Robert Kraft said "We had an angel looking out for us."

This was the second postseason meeting between the Ravens and Patriots. Baltimore won the only prior meeting 33–14 in the 2009 AFC Wild Card playoffs.

===== Reactions =====
None of the Ravens players blamed the loss entirely on Cundiff.

Linebacker Terrell Suggs told ESPN that there was a miscommunication on the sideline prior to the missed field goal. He blamed it on the scoreboard, which he said inaccurately stated there was a first down. In fact, the Ravens were one yard shy.

Punter Sam Koch said the play felt rushed. Cundiff himself said he was late getting on the field.

Cundiff pointed the finger at himself alone following the game, but stated that these moments do not define a player, and that he had intended to move on with his career. He said that he had made kicks like that 1000 times before, and that there was no excuse. He said it is a lesson he would learn from. He said he hoped to make amends during the next season. Despite his statement, Cundiff was cut by the Ravens before the start of the 2012 season in favor of rookie kicker Justin Tucker.

Ravens fans reacted to the loss with shock and were described as "heartbroken".

University of Kansas basketball fans mocked Cundiff during a game that took place the following day. This included holding up white cardboard letters that spelled out C-U-N-D-I-F-F, and tilting them to the shooter's left, during the game whenever an opponent shot a free throw.

==== NFC: New York Giants 20, San Francisco 49ers 17 (OT) ====
New York Giants vs. San Francisco 49ers – Game summary

Quarter	1	2	3	4	OT	Total
Giants	0	10	0	7	3	20
49ers	7	0	7	3	0	17

at Candlestick Park, San Francisco, California

- Date: January 22
- Game time: 6:30 p.m. EST/3:30 p.m. PST
- Game weather: 52 °F (11 °C), rain
- Game attendance: 69,732
- Referee: Ed Hochuli
- TV announcers (Fox): Joe Buck (play-by-play), Troy Aikman (color commentator), Pam Oliver, and Chris Myers (sideline reporters)
- Recap

Game information

1st quarter

- SF – Vernon Davis 73-yard pass from Alex Smith (David Akers kick), 7:11. 49ers 7–0. Drive: 2 plays, 73 yards, 0:13

2nd quarter

- NYG – Bear Pascoe 6-yard pass from Eli Manning (Lawrence Tynes kick), 11:15. Tied 7–7. Drive: 10 plays, 69 yards, 4:16
- NYG – Lawrence Tynes 31-yard field goal, 0:02. Giants 10–7. Drive: 10 plays, 51 yards, 1:34

3rd quarter

- SF – Vernon Davis 28-yard pass from Alex Smith (David Akers kick), 5:18. 49ers 14–10. Drive: 3 plays, 54 yards, 1:30

4th quarter

- NYG – Mario Manningham 17-yard pass from Eli Manning (Lawrence Tynes kick), 8:34. Giants 17–14. Drive: 6 plays, 29 yards, 2:34
- SF – David Akers 25-yard field goal, 5:39. Tied 17–17. Drive: 6 plays, 48 yards, 2:55

Overtime

- NYG – Lawrence Tynes 31-yard field goal, 7:06. Giants 20–17. Drive: 5 plays, 11 yards, 2:26

Leading passers

- NYG – Eli Manning – 32/58, 316 yards, 2 TD
- SF – Alex Smith – 12/26, 196 yards, 2 TD

Leading rushers

- NYG – Ahmad Bradshaw – 20 rushes, 74 yards
- SF – Frank Gore – 16 rushes, 74 yards

Leading receivers

- NYG – Victor Cruz – 10 receptions, 142 yards
- SF – Vernon Davis – 3 receptions, 112 yards, 2 TD

For the fifth time in conference championship history and for the third time in five years, overtime decided the game, and as it was in the 2007 NFC Championship Game, a field goal by Lawrence Tynes was the winning score as the Giants defeated the 49ers for their fifth NFC Championship Game victory. The Giants became the third team in NFL history to advance to the Super Bowl with fewer than 10 wins during a 16-game regular season, joining the 1979 Los Angeles Rams and the 2008 Arizona Cardinals. (Additionally, Green Bay won Super Bowl II after a 9–4–1 season.)

The 49ers scored the first touchdown of the game as quarterback Alex Smith connected with tight end Vernon Davis deep for a 73-yard touchdown pass midway through the opening quarter. Davis was called for an excessive celebration penalty after he climbed atop the camera tower in the back of the end zone, which forced David Akers to kick off from the 49ers' 20-yard line. San Francisco took possession of the ball on downs when New York failed to convert a fourth-and-1 situation from their 34-yard line. On the first play of the ensuing drive the 49ers attempted an end-around reverse play where receiver Kyle Williams would be the ball carrier. Williams, however, could not handle the handoff on the end-around and fumbled the ball but was able to recover when the ball squirted out of the grasp of a Giants defender. The 49ers punted three plays later, but this would not be the last time Williams' ball-handling would cause his team trouble during the game.

The Giants tied the score on the next drive, as Eli Manning found tight end Bear Pascoe for a six-yard touchdown pass to complete a 10-play, 69-yard drive. Manning completed passes to wide receiver Victor Cruz twice on the drive, one for a large gain that afforded New York the football in San Francisco territory. It was among two of 10 catches that Cruz made during the game. They then gained the lead on the last drive of the half, as Tynes converted the first of two successful field goals with a 31-yard kick. Cruz was again Manning's key target on the drive, with four receptions including a catch that set up Tynes' attempt. With 5:18 remaining in the third quarter, the 49ers regained the lead on Smith's second touchdown pass. San Francisco was able to move the ball 54 yards in six plays and was aided by Williams' 24-yard return of Steve Weatherford's punt; Williams was playing the position of punt returner in place of Ted Ginn, Jr., who missed the game with an injury. Frank Gore caught a pass from Smith on the second play of the drive for a 24-yard gain to the New York 28-yard line whereupon Davis caught his second touchdown pass on the next play to give the 49ers a 14–10 lead.

After the teams traded punts on the next three possessions, the 49ers began on their own 12-yard line as the third quarter was drawing to a close. An eleven-yard run by Gore was followed by a short completion from Smith to tight end Delanie Walker for seven yards. However, Chris Canty was called for a roughing the passer penalty, which added fifteen yards to the end of the play and advanced the ball to the San Francisco 45-yard line as the fourth quarter began. Gore ran for six yards on the next play, with Anthony Dixon adding three more on the play after that. Chase Blackburn and Linval Joseph made a tackle on the third down play to stop the drive at the New York 46-yard line. Instead of going for it, the 49ers elected to take a delay of game penalty and punt the football back to the Giants.

The ensuing drive for the Giants started at their own 20-yard line, but the 49ers held them to a three and out with two Manning incompletions sandwiched around an Aldon Smith sack. Weatherford again came out for a punt, with Williams standing ready to field the ball at his own 38-yard line. The ball hit the turf at the 45-yard line and bounced back toward Williams, who chose to let the ball continue rolling down the field. Giants receiver Devin Thomas, seeing this, began sprinting toward the ball and picked it up near the 30-yard line. The officials gave the 49ers possession at the spot where Thomas had picked the ball up. Thomas, however, was insistent that Williams had touched the ball first, and ran the rest of the way into the end zone with the ball; if he was right, possession would have gone back to the Giants on a muff and a recovery, but the ball would be placed at the spot of the recovery since muffed punts, by rule, are unable to be advanced by the recovering team.

Tom Coughlin decided to take a chance and threw his red challenge flag onto the field to ask the officials to review the play. The replay showed that the ball had touched Williams' right knee at the spot where he attempted to field it, and the Giants received possession at the spot where Thomas picked the ball up, which was determined to be the 29-yard line of San Francisco. It took seven plays for New York to reach the end zone from there, with a 15-yard pass from Manning to Mario Manningham giving them the lead again.

The 49ers responded on their next possession and on the first three plays, they achieved successive first downs. The first was awarded as the result of a defensive foul, as Kenny Phillips was flagged for illegal use of hands, while the following two were earned by Smith and Kendall Hunter on running plays. Three plays later, Akers was called on to kick the game-tying field goal as the drive stalled at the New York 8-yard line. Akers converted tying the game at 17–17. The rest of the fourth quarter was uneventful as the teams traded possessions six times. The Giants punted three times while the 49ers did so twice, and regulation ended on a play where tight end Delanie Walker fumbled the football.

After a lengthy description of the current playoff overtime rules by referee Ed Hochuli, New York won the coin toss and elected to receive the opening kickoff of overtime; however, four plays later, they elected to punt the football. With the new overtime rules in place, this meant that since both teams had taken possession of the ball, the game was now sudden-death where the first team to score would win the football game. However, San Francisco could not advance the football on their possession and the 49ers elected to punt the football after three plays. The Giants started their drive from their 36-yard line and advanced near midfield on third down, but Manning was sacked by Justin Smith and Weatherford came out for his twelfth punt of the game. Once again, Williams fielded the kick. After returning the ball five yards Giants linebacker Jacquian Williams reached in and stripped the football from Williams and Thomas recovered it at the San Francisco 24-yard line. It was Williams' second official fumble and second lost fumble, and the last time the 49ers would possess the ball.

Ahmad Bradshaw carried the football on three successive plays and rushed for eight, six and four yards to the San Francisco six yard line. On the fourth snap, Manning simply took the ball to the middle of the field and kneeled, which brought up third down. Tynes was called out onto the field for what was a 26-yard field goal, but the Giants were called for a delay-of-game penalty, making it a 31-yard attempt. Tynes alleged there was a patch of dirt at the 16-yard line and felt more comfortable kicking 5 yards back. After San Francisco called timeout to try to attempt to distract Tynes, he converted the field goal successfully despite a low snap. With the victory, the Giants moved on to Indianapolis to play the Patriots in the Super Bowl.

As had happened in the previous four conference championship games that required overtime to decide them, the winning margin was a field goal. Tynes became the first person to kick the winning field goal in overtime twice and became the first since Garrett Hartley of the New Orleans Saints did so in the 2009 NFC Championship Game. New York became the second consecutive team to win three playoff games to reach the Super Bowl after the Packers won three road playoff games the year before. San Francisco lost its second consecutive NFC Championship Game where they served as the host team, having lost the 1997 NFC Championship Game at home to the Packers. The 49ers dropped to a win–loss record of 1–5 in NFC Championship Game appearances since their victory in 1990 over the Los Angeles Rams to advance to Super Bowl XXIV; the Giants handed the 49ers two of those losses (one of them in very similar fashion to this game 21 years earlier) and the Dallas Cowboys also defeated them twice. Meanwhile, New York won their fifth NFC Championship Game in as many tries and won their third conference championship game on the road in the process. The three road wins all came on the last play of the game (1990, 2007, and this game), while the two home wins were both by shutout (1986 and 2000).

Manning, despite being sacked six times and constantly under pressure by the 49ers, was praised for his gutsy performance. He completed 32 of 58 passes for 316 yards and two touchdowns with no turnovers in the rainy contest. Smith had 196 passing yards and two touchdowns – both to Davis – finishing 12-for-26. This was Smith's last 49ers playoff game as he was replaced by Colin Kaepernick in 2012. Bradshaw and Gore each rushed for 74 yards while Cruz led all receivers with 10 catches for 142 yards. Davis caught three passes for 112 yards and two touchdowns. Of San Francisco's six sacks, defensive end Ray McDonald had a team-high two and a half. Justin Tuck led New York with one and a half of the team's three sacks. San Francisco fumbled the football on four occasions and Williams lost the two fumbles which were the only turnovers of the game. There were twenty-two combined punts in the game, as Weatherford and Andy Lee recorded twelve and ten punts, respectively. The 49ers converted only one third down in 13 opportunities.

This was the eighth postseason meeting between the Giants and 49ers. San Francisco had won four of the prior seven meetings, including 39–38 in the 2002 NFC Wild Card playoffs.

== Super Bowl XLVI: New York Giants 21, New England Patriots 17 ==
Super Bowl XLVI – New York Giants vs. New England Patriots – Game summary

Quarter	1	2	3	4	Total
Giants (NFC)	9	0	6	6	21
Patriots (AFC)	0	10	7	0	17

at Lucas Oil Stadium, Indianapolis

- Date: February 5
- Game time: 6:30 p.m. EST
- Game weather: Played with roof closed, retractable roof stadium
- Game attendance: 68,658
- Referee: John Parry
- TV announcers (NBC): Al Michaels (play-by-play), Cris Collinsworth (color commentator), and Michele Tafoya (sideline reporters)
- Recap

Game information

1st quarter

- NYG – Intentional Grounding Penalty on Patriots quarterback Tom Brady in the endzone for a safety, 8:52. Giants 2–0.'
- NYG – Victor Cruz 2-yard pass from Eli Manning (Lawrence Tynes kick), 3:24. Giants 9–0. Drive: 9 plays, 78 yards, 5:23

2nd quarter

- NE – Stephen Gostkowski 29-yard field goal, 13:48. Giants 9–3. Drive: 10 plays, 60 yards, 4:32
- NE – Danny Woodhead 4-yard pass from Tom Brady (Stephen Gostkowski kick), 0:08. Patriots 10–9. Drive: 14 plays, 96 yards, 3:55

3rd quarter

- NE – Aaron Hernandez 12-yard pass from Tom Brady (Stephen Gostkowski kick), 11:20. Patriots 17–9. Drive: 8 plays, 79 yards, 3:40
- NYG – Lawrence Tynes 38-yard field goal, 6:43. Patriots 17–12. Drive: 7 plays, 45 yards, 4:37
- NYG – Lawrence Tynes 33-yard field goal, 0:35. Patriots 17–15. Drive: 8 plays, 36 yards, 5:01

4th quarter

- NYG – Ahmad Bradshaw 6-yard run (run failed), 0:57. Giants 21–17. Drive: 9 plays, 88 yards, 2:49

Leading Passer

- NYG – Eli Manning – 30/40, 296 yards, TD
- NE – Tom Brady – 27/41, 276 yards, 2 TD, INT

Leading Rusher

- NYG – Ahmad Bradshaw – 17 rushes, 72 yards, TD
- NE – BenJarvus Green-Ellis – 10 rushes, 44 yards

Leading Receiver

- NYG – Hakeem Nicks – 10 receptions, 109 yards
- NE – Aaron Hernandez – 8 receptions, 67 yards, TD

This was the second Super Bowl matchup between the Giants and Patriots, with New York pulling off the upset in Super Bowl XLII.
