= Hakeem Nicks =

American football player (born 1988)

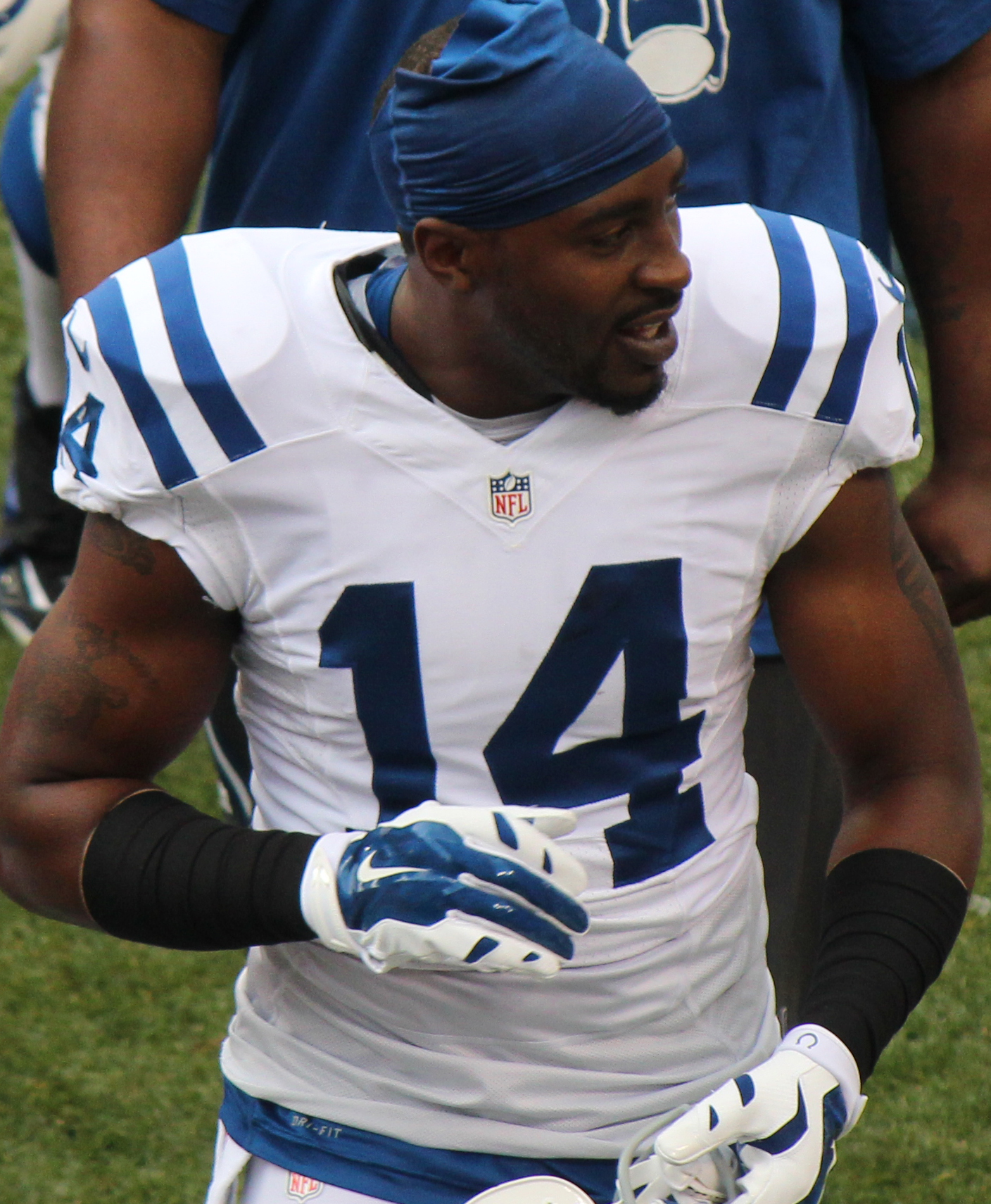
- Nicks with the Indianapolis Colts in 2014

No. 88, 14, 15
- Position: Wide receiver

Personal information
- Born: January 14, 1988 (age 38); Charlotte, North Carolina, U.S.
- Listed height: 6 ft 1 in (1.85 m)
- Listed weight: 208 lb (94 kg)

Career information
- High school: Independence (Charlotte)
- College: North Carolina (2006–2008)
- NFL draft: 2009: 1st round, 29th overall pick

Career history
- New York Giants (2009–2013); Indianapolis Colts (2014); Tennessee Titans (2015)*; New York Giants (2015); New Orleans Saints (2016)*
- * Offseason or practice squad member only

Awards and highlights
- Super Bowl champion (XLVI); 97th greatest New York Giant of all-time; First-team All-ACC (2008); Second-team All-ACC (2007)

Career NFL statistics
- Receptions: 356
- Receiving yards: 5,081
- Receiving touchdowns: 31
- Stats at Pro Football Reference

Hakeem Amir Nicks (born January 14, 1988) is an American former professional football player who was a wide receiver in the National Football League (NFL). He played college football for the North Carolina Tar Heels, and was selected by the New York Giants in the first round of the 2009 NFL draft. Nicks has also played for the Indianapolis Colts.

== Early life ==
Nicks was born in Charlotte, North Carolina. He attended Independence High School in Charlotte. While playing football there, he was rated as one of the Top 10 Players in North Carolina by SuperPrep and Rivals.com. He was also named the Charlotte Observer Offensive Player of the Year and was also selected to the North Carolina Associated Press All-State team. He never lost a game in high school, and completed his senior year with MVP honors in the NCHSAA 4AA state championship game. In the game, he posted eight catches for 205 yards and two touchdowns (one for 11 and another for 80 yards). He posted 93 catches for 1,819 yards and 20 touchdowns in his senior year.

== College career ==
During his freshman season, Nicks started all 11 games in which he played, missing one game due to an ankle sprain. He had a breakout game against Notre Dame on November 4 with six receptions for 171 yards and two touchdowns. He finished the 2006 season with 39 receptions for 660 yards and four touchdowns. Nicks led the team and set school single-season records for receptions and receiving yards by a freshman. He ranked third in the ACC in receiving yards per game and eighth in receptions per game.

On September 15, 2007, Nicks had seven receptions for 113 yards and two touchdowns in a game against Virginia. On October 13, against South Carolina, he had eight receptions for 114 yards. On November 17, he had seven receptions for 162 yards and one touchdown against Georgia Tech. In the 2007 season, Nicks had 74 catches for 958 receiving yards along with five touchdowns. His single-season receiving yards were the third most in school history. Nicks finished second in the ACC with 79.8 receiving yards per game and third with 6.17 catches per game. Has made at least one catch in 22 of 23 games played and caught at least two passes in each game his sophomore season.

Nicks had six receptions for 110 yards to start the 2008 season against McNeese State. He had two receiving touchdowns in the next game against Rutgers. On September 27, against Miami (FL), he had five receptions for 133 yards and a touchdown. On October 11, verses Notre Dame, he had nine receptions for 141 receiving yards. Two weeks later, he had eight receptions for 139 receiving yards and three receiving touchdowns to go along with a rushing touchdown against Boston College. Nicks was honored as a First-team All-ACC selection at wide receiver. By the completion of his junior season, Nicks set 14 school records at UNC, including career receptions (181), career receiving yards (2,580), and career touchdowns (21). During his last season, Nicks tallied 68 catches for school records of 1,222 yards and 12 touchdowns. The 68 receptions tied for third most in a season in school history. Nicks led the ACC and ranked 12th nationally with 94.0 receiving yards per game. Nicks caught at least one pass in 26 straight games and had a catch in 35 of 36 career games. He set the UNC single-season receiving yardage record and became North Carolina's first 1,000-yard receiver.

Nicks ended his collegiate career in the 2008 Meineke Car Care Bowl, where he caught eight passes for a bowl record of 217 yards, with three going for touchdowns of 73, 66 and 25 yards, in a game against West Virginia. One of his other catches in that game was offered a candidate for the "Greatest Catch of the Year."

Four years after he had left North Carolina, Nicks was found guilty of academic fraud during the 2008 school year. His record setting season will remain in the media guide, but the school said they will place an asterisk by his records. Nicks was found to have received some jewelry and money during his years at North Carolina.

== Professional career ==
=== Pre-draft ===
Considered to be one of the top wide receivers available in the 2009 NFL draft, Nicks drew comparisons to Hines Ward and Anquan Boldin. Butch Davis, Nicks' coach at North Carolina, went even further, comparing him to Hall of Famer Michael Irvin.

Pre-draft measurables
Height	Weight	Arm length	Hand span	40-yard dash	10-yard split	20-yard split	20-yard shuttle	Three-cone drill	Vertical jump	Wonderlic
6 ft 0 3/4 in (1.85 m)	212 lb (96 kg)	33 1/2 in (0.85 m)	10 1/2 in (0.27 m)	4.63 s	1.70 s	2.74 s	4.43 s	6.96 s	36.0 in (0.91 m)	11
20-ss and 3-cone from UNC Pro Day, all others from NFL Combine

=== New York Giants (first stint) ===
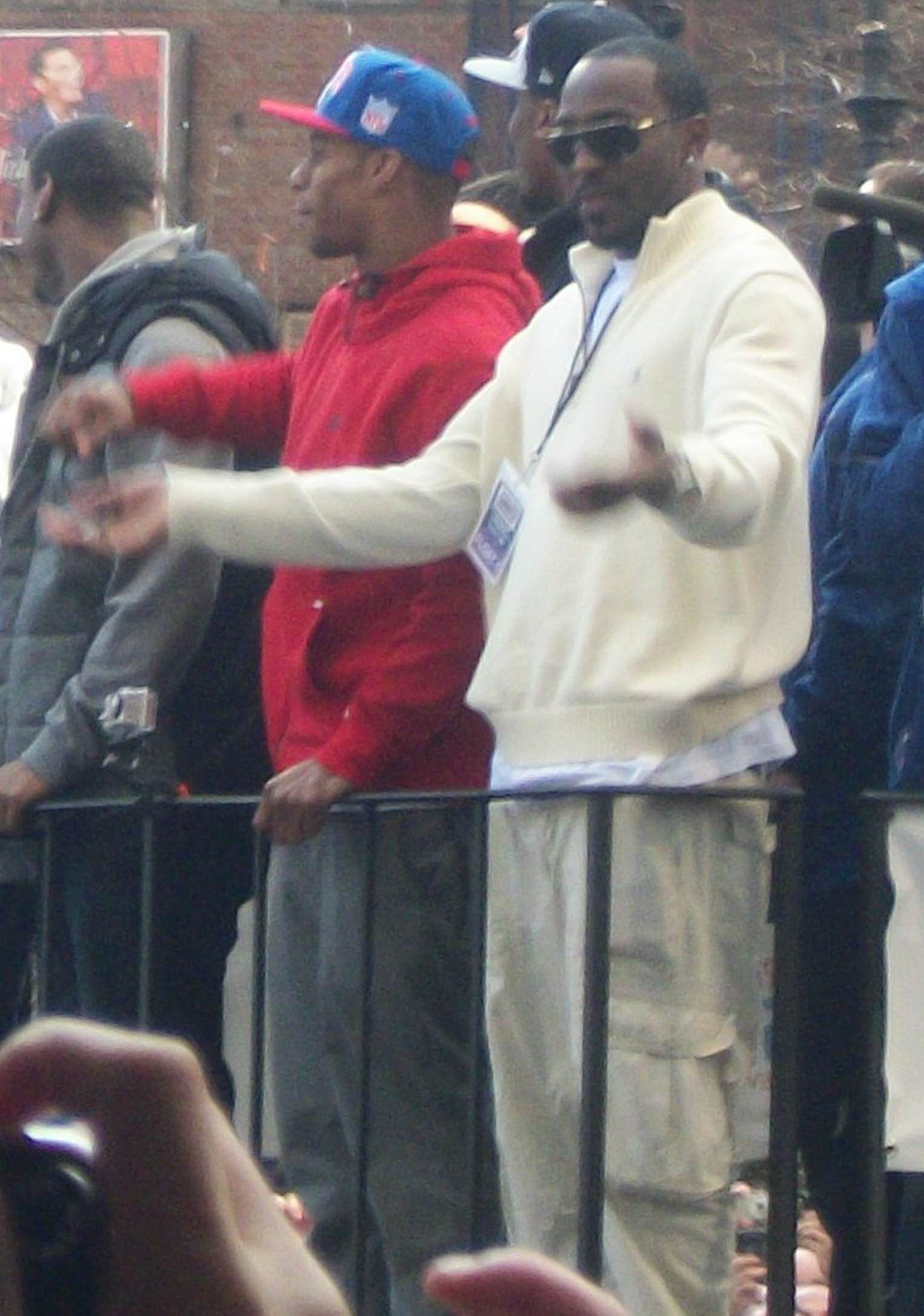
Nicks at the Giants' Super Bowl XLVI parade in 2012 with Victor Cruz.

The New York Giants, in need to replace wide-out Plaxico Burress, selected Nicks in the first round, 29th overall. Nicks was the fifth wide receiver taken in the draft, and one out of six taken in the first round alone.

On August 1, 2009, Nicks signed a five-year, $12.54 million contract. The deal includes a $6.5 million signing bonus. During training camp, Nicks vied for a starting position with the Giants' other wide receivers, most notably Domenik Hixon and Steve Smith, and Hakeem Nicks had the best overall average of all these wide receivers with a 16.0 average.

Nicks made his first career NFL reception on September 13, 2009, against the Washington Redskins on wide receiver screen pass for 11 yards. On October 4, 2009, against the Kansas City Chiefs, Nicks recorded his first touchdown reception on a 54-yard screen pass. For the next four games, Nicks would score a touchdown pass in each, becoming the first Giants rookie to score touchdowns in four consecutive games since Bob Gaiters, who scored in five straight games in 1961. However, Odell Beckham Jr. broke that record. On the strength of that feat, Nicks was named the NFL Offensive Rookie of the Month. Nicks ended the season starting in the #2 wide receiver spot opposite Steve Smith after an injury to Domenik Hixon in Week 2 and outperforming Mario Manningham as of Week 14. He finished his rookie season with 47 receptions for 790 receiving yards and six receiving touchdowns. He had two games on the season going over the 100-yard mark.

At the start of the 2010 season, Nicks recorded his first three-touchdown game against the Carolina Panthers during the season opener, catching a total of four passes for 75 yards in a winning effort. During Week 5, when New York visited Houston, Nicks exploited the NFL's 29th ranked secondary and more specifically Texans rookie cornerback Kareem Jackson as he reeled in career highs with 12 catches (tying a franchise record) for 130 yards. In addition, Nicks caught two touchdown passes on the day from quarterback Eli Manning. In Week 7 against the Dallas Cowboys, he had nine receptions for 108 yards and two touchdowns in the 41–35 victory. In Week 9 against the Seattle Seahawks, he had six receptions for 128 yards and a touchdown in the 41–7 victory. Nicks was inactive for the final game of the season in Washington due to a broken toe in his left foot. On the year, he recorded 1,052 yards on 79 receptions, and was fourth in the NFL with 11 receiving touchdowns.

Nicks opened the 2011 season, his third, with seven receptions for 122 yards in a loss to Washington, followed three weeks later with 10 receptions for a career-best 162 yards and a touchdown against Arizona in the Giants' third-straight win. Nicks remained one of the few bright spots in the Giants' subsequent 2–5 slump, averaging 73 yards per game and recording four touchdowns. In Week 13, he had two receiving touchdowns against the Green Bay Packers in a 38–35 loss. In Week 14 at Dallas, Nicks again had a career-best 163 yards on ten receptions in a pivotal 37–34 win. In the 2011 season, Nicks had his second straight 1,000+ yard receiving season. He caught 76 passes for 1,192 yards (15.7 yards per catch average) and seven touchdowns, helping the Giants sneak into the playoffs at 9–7.

In the Giants' historically improbable 2011 postseason, Nicks had the most prolific receiving statistics in franchise history. In the Wild Card Round against the Atlanta Falcons, Nicks recorded six receptions for 115 yards and two touchdowns in the 24–2 victory. The following week against the top seeded 15–1 Green Bay Packers in the Divisional Round, Nicks hauled in seven catches for 165 yards and two more touchdowns, including a 37-yard Hail Mary reception at the end of the first half. After 55 yards in the NFC Championship win over San Francisco, in Super Bowl XLVI against the New England Patriots Nicks was the leading receiver for the game with 10 receptions for 109 yards to help secure a 21–17 New York Giants victory. As of 2017, Nicks' 2011 postseason numbers remain franchise records with 28 receptions for 444 yards (also most all-purpose yards) and 4 receiving touchdowns (also tied with Joe Morris and Brandon Jacobs for most total touchdowns). He also holds postseason career franchise records for most Yds/Rec with 15.86, Yds/Game with 111, most 100+ yard receiving games with 3, and along with Amani Toomer is the only Giant with 2 games with 2+ TD scored.

In Week 2 of the 2012 season, Nicks had ten receptions for 199 receiving yards and one receiving touchdown in the 41–34 victory over the Tampa Bay Buccaneers. In the 2012 season, Nicks recorded 53 receptions for 692 receiving yards and three receiving touchdowns.

In the 2013 season opener for the Giants, Nicks had five receptions for 114 yards against the Dallas Cowboys. In Week 5 against the Philadelphia Eagles, he had nine receptions for 142 yards. In Week 14 against the San Diego Chargers, he had five receptions for 135 receiving yards. In the 2013 season, Nicks did not record a touchdown reception, but still finished with 896 receiving yards in 15 games played for the Giants. Nearing the trade deadline on October 29, there was speculation that the New York Giants were going to trade him. As the deadline passed, no deal was done and Nicks remained a Giant until his contract expired at the conclusion of the season, making him a free agent.

=== Indianapolis Colts ===
On March 14, 2014, Nicks signed a one-year deal worth a maximum of $5.5 million with the Indianapolis Colts. In the Colts' Week 17 game against the Tennessee Titans, Nicks reached 5,000 receiving yards for his career. He finished the season with 38 receptions, 408 yards, and four touchdowns.

Nicks scored a receiving touchdown in the Colts' 24–13 win over the Denver Broncos in the Divisional Round.

=== Tennessee Titans ===
On April 24, 2015, Nicks signed a one-year deal with the Tennessee Titans.

Nicks was released by the Titans on September 5, 2015.

=== New York Giants (second stint) ===
On November 17, 2015, Nicks returned to the Giants, signing a one-year deal. In six games, he recorded seven receptions for 54 yards.

=== New Orleans Saints ===
Nicks signed a one-year contract with the New Orleans Saints on July 27, 2016. On August 8, 2016, the Saints waived Nicks.

=== XFL ===
Nicks participated in a tryout for the XFL in June 2019.

== Career statistics ==
=== NFL ===
Legend
	NFL record
	Led the league
**Bold**	Career high

==== Regular season ====
Year	Team	Games		Receiving							Rushing					Fumbles	
Year	Team	GP	GS	Tgt	Rec	Yds	Avg	Lng	TD	FD	Att	Yds	Avg	Lng	TD	Fum	Lost
2009	NYG	14	6	74	47	790	**16.8**	**68T**	6	32	**2**	**8**	**4.0**	**9**	0	**2**	0
2010	NYG	13	12	128	**79**	1,052	13.3	46T	**11**	45	—	—	—	—	—	1	0
2011	NYG	15	**15**	**133**	76	**1,192**	15.7	**68**	7	**54**	—	—	—	—	—	0	0
2012	NYG	13	11	100	53	692	13.1	50	3	35	—	—	—	—	—	0	0
2013	NYG	15	**15**	101	56	896	16.0	57	0	38	—	—	—	—	—	0	0
2014	IND	**16**	6	68	38	405	10.7	29	4	18	—	—	—	—	—	0	0
2015	NYG	6	2	14	7	54	7.7	19	0	2	—	—	—	—	—	0	0
Total		92	67	618	356	5,081	14.3	68	31	224	2	8	4.0	9	0	3	0

==== Postseason ====
Year	Team	Games		Receiving							Rushing					Fumbles	
Year	Team	GP	GS	Tgt	Rec	Yds	Avg	Lng	TD	FD	Att	Yds	Avg	Lng	TD	Fum	Lost
2011	NYG	**4**	**4**	**43**	**28**	**444**	15.9	**72T**	**4**	**19**	—	—	—	—	—	0	0
2014	IND	3	0	8	6	98	**16.3**	45	1	5	—	—	—	—	—	0	0
Total		7	4	51	34	542	15.9	72	5	24	0	0	0.0	0	0	0	0

=== College ===
Season	Team	GP	Receiving					Rushing				
Season	Team	GP	Rec	Yds	Avg	Lng	TD	Att	Yds	Avg	Lng	TD
2006	North Carolina	11	39	660	16.9	83	4	1	10	10.0	10	0
2007	North Carolina	12	74	958	12.9	53	5	1	−1	−1.0	−1	0
2008	North Carolina**	13	68	1,222*	18.0	74	12*	5	34	6.8	12	1
Career		181*	2,840*	15.9	83	21*	36	7	43	8.6	12	1

* school record ** vacated from school record books

== Career highlights ==
NFL

- Super Bowl champion (XLVI)
- NFC champion (2011)
- NFL Alumni Wide Receiver of the Year (2011)
- Ranked #90 in the Top 100 Players of 2012
- NFL Offensive Rookie of the Month (October 2009)
- Most pass targets in a postseason (43)
- 97th greatest New York Giant of all-time

College

- Most career receptions in UNC history (181) * Ryan Switzer Broke this
- Most career TD receptions in UNC history (21)
- Most single-season TD receptions in UNC history (12)
- First-team All-ACC by Rivals.com (2007)
- Second-team All-ACC by The Associated Press (2007)
- First-team All-ACC by ACSMA/AP (2008)

== Personal life ==
Nicks is the son of Rob Nicks Jr. and Lisa Mason. He has two brothers, Anwar and Aleef, and a daughter named Harmony.

On August 24, 2022, Nicks auctioned off his Super Bowl XLVI ring. On August 28, 2022, the ring sold for $117,000 and plans on donating some of that money to charity.
