= Prospa (company) =

Australian financial technology company

- Type: Private
- Traded as: ASX: PGL
- Industry: Financial services
- Founded: 2012; 14 years ago
- Founders: Beau Bertoli; Greg Moshal
- Headquarters: Sydney, Australia
- Areas served: Australia; New Zealand
- Key people: Greg Moshal (CEO)
- Products: Business loan
- Website: prospa.com prospa.co.nz

Prospa is an Australian financial technology company specializing in online lending services for small and medium-sized enterprises (SMEs). It is based in Sydney and has operations in Australia and New Zealand.

== History ==
Prospa was founded in 2012 by Beau Bertoli and Greg Moshal. It was founded in response to the cash flow difficulties that small and medium-sized enterprises (SMEs) in Australia face in securing bank financing.

In 2017, Prospa raised A$25 million from AirTree in a funding round that valued Prospa at A$235 million.

In 2018, Prospa was listed on the Australian Securities Exchange, raising A$110 million in the initial public offering. The IPO was initially delayed just 15 minutes before it was supposed to open, and later described as "bizarre". The delay was triggered after issues regarding the fairness of their contracts were identified by regulators. A year later, in 2019, Prospa was launched in New Zealand.

In early 2024, Prospa acquired the loan portfolio from Zip Business, with a transaction valued at approximately $15.6 million. This move encompasses all remaining performing Australian commercial loans from Zip Co, which amount to approximately $18.4 million and were distributed among around 370 small businesses.

In 2024, Salter Brothers Tech Fund led the consortium to take Prospa private and acquired a minority stake in Prospa for $74 million. It was taken private at just A$0.45 per share, considerably lower than the A$3.78 it had sold for when it first went public.

== Operations ==
Prospa is active in Australia and New Zealand with headquarters located in Sydney, Australia.

Prospa provides business loans and line of credit to small and medium-sized enterprises (SMEs) in Australia and New Zealand, ranging from $5,000 to $1 million with terms up to five years.

In March 2026, Prospa announced a partnership with Qantas Business Rewards, allowing eligible SME customers to earn Qantas Points on selected business loans, with points redeemable through the Qantas Business Rewards program.

== Technology ==
Prospa's Credit Decision Engine evaluates over 450 data points, primarily from third-party sources, to determine the creditworthiness of applicants. The software allows a fast turnaround on loan applications. In 2024, Prospa launched Prospa IQ, a new quoting tool.
