= Sunday in the Park with Jorge =

11th episode of the 11th season of Law & Order

- Law & Order episode
- Episode no.: Season 11; Episode 11
- Directed by: James Quinn
- Written by: William M. Finkelstein
- Original air date: January 24, 2001

Guest appearances
- Selenis Leyva as DeeDee Salazar; Ben Weber as Ethan Capp; Nick Gomez as Latin Thug; Dan Lauria as Deputy Chief Joseph "Joe" Strudevant; Glenn Fitzgerald as Seth Teitel; Michael Mulheren as Judge Harrison Taylor; Mark Kenneth Smaltz as Judge William Koehler; Gordana Rashovich as Attorney Simone Reuben

Episode chronology
← Previous "Whose Monkey is it Anyway?"	Next → "Teenage Wasteland"

"Sunday in the Park with Jorge" is the 11th episode of the eleventh season of the American legal drama television series Law & Order, and the 240th episode overall. The title of the episode is a play on words on the Stephen Sondheim musical Sunday in the Park with George.

The episode was written by William M. Finkelstein and directed by James Quinn, and originally aired on NBC on January 24, 2001.

== Plot ==
A couple in a rowboat in Central Park discover the body of a severely beaten woman in a pond during the Puerto Rican Day Parade celebrations.

Meanwhile, a riot broke out in the park where many women were accosted. The response of the police is criticized throughout the city, leading to pressure from One Police Plaza and the mayor's office to find the murderer among the rioters.

Detectives Lennie Briscoe and Ed Green interview Hispanic men arrested for robbery and sexual assault in the park that day.

The murder victim is the wife of a young billionaire. The detectives soon discover that she had retained the services of a divorce attorney and had planned to make the divorce very costly for her husband. He has an alibi for the day of the murder, having been out with his new girlfriend. The detectives interview her, where they notice that she has bruises on her neck. She explains that she got the bruises from her husband's best friend and his company's vice president, Seth.

After interviewing Seth, the detectives discover that he was heavily invested in the company and that his stake in the company could vanish if the divorce carried through. He claims to have met the victim in the rowboat at the park to persuade the victim to separate amicably. Because of his financial stake and his violence against the girlfriend, the detectives are not convinced and arrest him. Despite apprehension from the mayor's office, who had wanted to prosecute a member of the mob, D.A. Nora Lewin decides to proceed with the prosecution on circumstantial evidence.

One of the men convicted of assault in the park strikes a deal to reduce his sentence in return for testimony identifying Seth at the park that day. Detective Briscoe tells Jack McCoy that there is an inconsistency in his testimony, and after further pressure, he recants: he did see Seth in the boat, but Seth left the scene before she was killed.

Follow-up investigation finds a new suspect, Nestor Salazar, a Brazilian man at the riot with his friends. Witnesses identified him as the man who harassed the victim then beat her to death in the rowboat.

Salazar is charged with the murder, and effectively admits to killing her on the stand. However, he claims he never intended to kill her, and that his actions were motivated by peer pressure to intimidate the woman as his friends did to the other women who were attacked. Despite his stated intentions, the jury convicts Salazar of manslaughter.

== Controversy ==
"Sunday in the Park with Jorge" was loosely based on the Puerto Rican Day Parade attacks in June 2000 before the episode aired, in which over four dozen women claimed to be groped and where the police response was heavily criticized.

After the episode aired in January 2001, it generated protests from many Puerto Rican activist organizations. Answering a grievance from the National Puerto Rican Coalition, who did not deny the crime nor the Puerto Rican background of the perpetrators, network executives issued a formal apology and made a pledge to "improve our procedures regarding sensitive programming issues".

Series producer Dick Wolf criticized the decision, questioning if the legitimate background of every perpetrator from a "based on actual events" plot would have to be excised in every future episode of the series.
