= Pocketbook =

Pocketbook may refer to:

== Pouch or bag ==
- Coin purse, a small money bag or pouch, made for carrying coins
- Handbag, a large bag for carrying personal items, also known as a purse.

== Art, entertainment, media ==
- A notebook (in British English), as carried by people such as police officers for keeping records.
- "Pocketbook", by Meshell Ndegeocello from Cookie: The Anthropological Mixtape (2002)
- "Pocketbook", by Jennifer Hudson from Jennifer Hudson (2009)
- Paperback, a type of book binding often referred to as a "pocket book"
- Pocket edition, an abridged edition of a book or a small-size book made to be carried in the pocket
- Pocketbook (application), a Sydney-based free budget planner and personal finance app
- Pocket Books, a division of Simon & Schuster that primarily publishes paperback books

== Brands and companies ==
- PocketBook International, a maker of PocketBook brand e-book readers and tablet computers, and publisher of BookLand ebooks
- Acorn Pocket Book

== See also ==
- Pamphlet, an unbound book historically known in England as a 'pocket book'
