= Zip Co =

Australian financial technology company

Zip Co Limited
- Formerly: ZipMoney Limited
- Type: Public limited company
- Traded as: ASX: ZIP; S&P/ASX 200 component
- Industry: Fintech, consumer finance, e-commerce
- Founded: 2013
- Headquarters: Sydney and New York City
- Area served: Australia, New Zealand, United States
- Key people: Larry Diamond (co-founder, US Chairman); Peter Gray (co-founder, ANZ CEO); Cynthia Scott (Group CEO, Managing Director); Joe Heck (US CEO)
- Products: Zip Pay, Zip Money, Zip Plus
- Website: zip.co

Zip Co Limited (abbreviated as Zip Co) is a digital financial services company with operations in Australia, New Zealand and the USA. According to their FY24 Annual Results, across the group they had 6.0 million active customers, total transaction volume of A$10.1 billion, revenue of A$4.0b, and cash gross profit of A$1.0B.

== History ==
The company was founded by Larry Diamond and Peter Gray in 2013 as Zip Money, and offered a digital credit option to customers. The organisation soon launched a second product, Zip Pay, to cater for everyday purchases, including retail and health. In 2015, Zip was listed on the Australian Securities Exchange as zipMoney Limited (ASX: ZML). In 2016, Zip acquired Pocketbook, one of the most popular finance apps in Australia. In 2017, Zip secured a $260 million debt facility with $200 million in funding from National Australia Bank, and a $40 million equity investment from Westpac. Zip was also ranked #7 on Deloitte’s Technology Fast 500 APAC. In December 2017, the company changed its name from ‘ZipMoney Limited’ to ‘Zip Co Limited’, now known simply as Zip. In January 2018, the ASX ticker code was changed from ‘ZML’ to ‘ZIP’.

In August 2018, the Zip app was launched in the Google Play Store and then the Apple App Store later that year.

In August 2019, Zip Co acquired 100% of the shares in PartPay Limited, a Buy Now, Pay Later company from New Zealand with early operations in the UK. The acquisition accelerated Zip’s global expansion.

In September 2019, Zip Co acquired SpotCap ANZ to enter the unsecured business lending market.

In December 2019, Zip Co announced that it has received firm commitments to raise $60 million before costs via a placement of 16,216,216 ordinary shares to fund its global expansion.

In June 2020, Zip Co bought the remaining shares in New York-based "buy now, pay later" company Quadpay Inc for $430 million as part of its efforts to expand globally. 14% interest in Quadpay was already owned by Zip which it bought as part of its deal with New Zealand-based PartPay for $84 million in August 2019.

As of March 2021, Zip operates in the United States, the United Kingdom, Australia and New Zealand. They are also minority shareholders in Payflex in South Africa and Twisto in the Czech Republic.

In October 2021, Zip Co acquired Middle Eastern buy now pay later platform Spotii.

In November 2021, Zip Co acquired European buy now pay later platform Twisto.

In April 2022, Zip changed their ASX ticker code from 'Z1P' to 'ZIP'

In July 2022, Zip Co ceased operations in Singapore.

In October 2022, Zip Co began a wind down from the United Kingdom and ceased operations.

In mid-July 2026, Zip Co announced that it would withdraw from the New Zealand market, effective 16 August 2026.

=== Trademark dispute ===
In May 2026, the High Court of Australia upheld a Federal Court of Australia ruling that Zip Co had infringed the intellectual property of Firstmac Limited, another Australian financial services provider which registered "Zip" as a trademark for a loan product in 2004. While Zip Co mounted a defence of "honest concurrent use", the High Court found that Zip Co had not acted honestly and had in fact deliberately targeted Firstmac's trademark.

== Products ==
The Zip digital wallet has two types of interest free accounts, Zip Pay and Zip Money. These accounts can be used with retail partners online and instore anywhere Zip is accepted.

=== Zip Pay / Zip Pay in 4 ===
Zip Pay is a digital wallet that allows customers to purchase immediately and pay later, both in-store and online.

It provides an interest-free service until the end of each month leaving a $7.95 fee if the amount isn't paid by the due date. Accounts are available from $250 up to $1,500.

At the beginning of each month, customers are sent a summary (called a "statement") of what they have spent and what they have paid for the month. They are then given the opportunity to pay it off in full or pay it off for a minimum of $40 a month. Those with a $1500 account have to pay a minimum of $80 a month.

=== Zip Money ===
Zip Money is also a digital wallet allowing customers to purchase immediately and pay later, both in store and online. It provides 6 months interest free service, providing a reusable amount of up to $30,000.

=== Zip plus ===
In 2023, the company introduced Zip Plus which offers credit limits from $2,000 to $4,000, with an interest rate of 12.95%p.a. accruing daily if the owing balance exceeds $1,500 at the end of each month and includes a monthly fee of $9.95.

== Discontinued products ==
As Zip has evolved as a business it has periodically retired products from its offering.

=== Pocketbook ===
Zip was the owner and developer of freeware app Pocketbook, which was one of Australia’s largest non-bank financial apps. Pocketbook was a freeware budget planner and personal finance app launched in 2012 and acquired by Zip in 2016. Users could set up and manage budgets, track spending and manage bills with the app. Pocketbook was the first personal finance app in Australia to offer users the ability to manage their money through linking their bank accounts. In 2016, Pocketbook claimed to support over 250,000 Australians. In January 2018, that number was 435,000. Zip announced the closure of Pocketbook in July 2022 and the app closed the following month.

=== Zip Business Trade and Trade Plus ===
Zip Business Trade and Zip Business Trade Plus were accounts specifically aimed at small and medium businesses. They offered similar features to Zip Pay and Zip Money, with interest free periods and higher credit limits. As of 5 July 2022 these products were no longer offered to new customers, and as of 31 August 2022, existing accounts could no transact with these accounts. Customers were advised to switch to Zip Pay and Zip Money accounts instead.

=== Zip Business Capital ===
Zip Business Capital accounts offered unsecured lending to small and medium businesses up to $500,000. As of May 2023, these products were no longer offered to new customers. In January 2024, Prospa acquired Zip Business’s loan book.
