= Pocketbook (application) =

Australian personal finance app

- Type: Finance
- Founded: 2012
- Founder: Alvin Singh, Bosco Tan
- Defunct: 2022
- Headquarters: Sydney, New South Wales Australia
- Area served: Australia
- Parent: Zip Co Ltd (ASX: Z1P)
- Website: getpocketbook.com

Pocketbook was a Sydney-based free budget planner and personal finance app launched in 2012. The app helped users setup and manage budgets, track spending and manage bills. As of 2016 Pocketbook claimed to support over 250,000 Australians, in January 2018 that number was 435,000.

After being acquired by Zip Co Ltd in 2016, it was announced in 2022 that the app was to be shut down and all user accounts deleted.

== History ==
Pocketbook was founded by Alvin Singh and Bosco Tan in 2012. It was conceived in 2011 in a Wolli Creek apartment as a tool for Alvin and Bosco to take control of their money.

In 2013, Pocketbook raised $500,000 from technology fund Tank Stream Ventures, and a group of investors including TV personality David Koch, Geoff Levy, David Shein and Peter Cooper. In September 2016 Digital retail finance and payment industry player zipMoney (now trading as Zip Co Limited) acquired Pocketbook in a $7.5m deal

== Features ==
The app synced with the bank account of users and would organize spending into different categories. Users could also be reminded of bill payments, analyse spending and set spending limits. They can also be alerted of fraudulent transactions and deductions. The app employs security measures like end to end encryption, CloudFlare protection, fraud detection, identity protection etc. Pocketbook was available via web and mobile version.

== Awards ==
- Personal Finance Innovator of the Year by Fintech Business Awards 2017
- Innovator of the Year by OPTUS MyBusiness Awards 2017
- Best Finance App of 2016 by Australian Fintech
- Best Personal Finance App: Pocketbook won the 2016 Finder Innovation Awards, presented at a gala dinner hosted by media personality and The New Inventors presenter James O'Loghlin.
- Best Mobile App of the Year Winner: StartCon hosted the first annual Australasian Startup Awards. Over 200 nominations in 14 categories and an overall winner were reviewed, and winners were determined by public voting, with over 63,000 votes in total.
- Best New Startup 2014 by StartupSmart.
- Finalist in the SWIFT Innotribe startup competition in Dubai in 2013.
