= Victor Cruz =

American football player (born 1986)

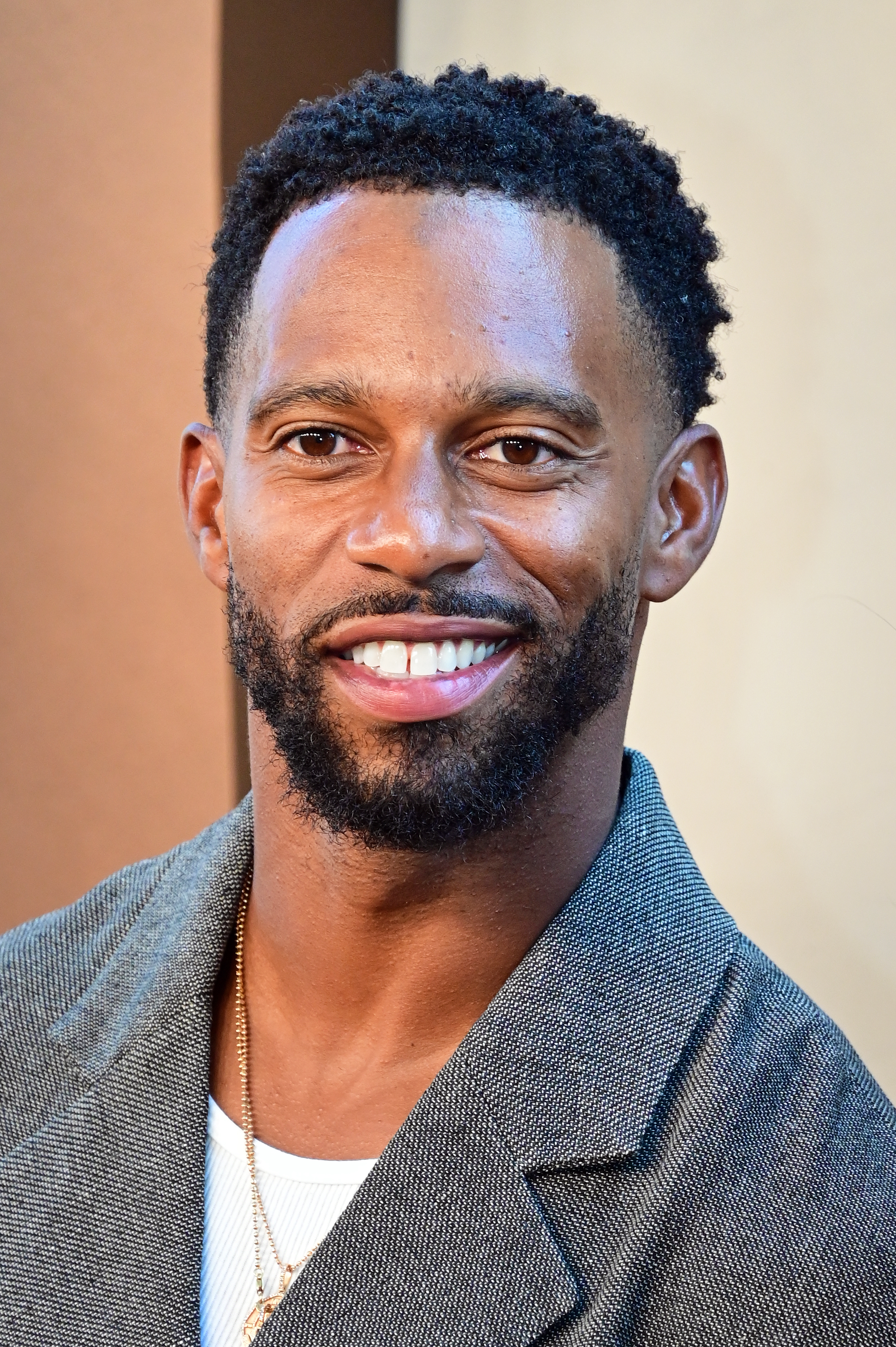
- Cruz in 2026

No. 80
- Position: Wide receiver

Personal information
- Born: November 11, 1986 (age 40); Paterson, New Jersey, U.S.
- Listed height: 6 ft 0 in (1.83 m)
- Listed weight: 204 lb (93 kg)

Career information
- High school: Paterson Catholic
- College: UMass (2005–2009)
- NFL draft: 2010: undrafted

Career history
- New York Giants (2010–2016); Chicago Bears (2017)*
- * Offseason or practice squad member only

Awards and highlights
- Super Bowl champion (XLVI); Second-team All-Pro (2011); Pro Bowl (2012); 59th greatest New York Giant of all-time; 2× First-team All-CAA (2008, 2009); NFL record: Longest receiving touchdown: 99 yards (tied)

Career NFL statistics
- Receptions: 303
- Receiving yards: 4,599
- Receiving touchdowns: 25
- Stats at Pro Football Reference

Victor Michael Cruz (born November 11, 1986) is an American former professional football player who was a wide receiver in the National Football League (NFL), spending seven seasons with the New York Giants. He played college football at UMass, and signed with the Giants as an undrafted free agent in 2010. With New York, he won Super Bowl XLVI over the New England Patriots, and made the 2012 Pro Bowl.

== Early life ==
Cruz was born in Paterson, New Jersey, on November 11, 1986, to Blanca Cruz and Michael Walker, a firefighter. His father was African American and his mother is Puerto Rican. Cruz's father died by suicide in 2007.

Cruz attended Paterson Catholic High School in Paterson. He completed a post-graduate semester at Bridgton Academy in North Bridgton, Maine. Cruz put up 47 catches for 869 yards and eight touchdowns in his single season at Bridgton Academy. At Paterson Catholic, Victor played wide receiver and defensive back for coach Andrew Slome, who he credits for his success. He earned All-State honors as a senior in 2003, when the team went undefeated at 11–0 and captured the New Jersey Parochial Group I championship. That season, Cruz caught 42 passes and scored 19 touchdowns—15 on receptions.

== College career ==
Cruz initially struggled to successfully combine his college studies with his football career, and was twice sent home from the University of Massachusetts for academic reasons. He only became eligible to play for the Minutemen in 2007, but went on to have both a solid college football career and to complete a BA in Afro-American Studies from UMass.

Cruz finished his career at UMass with 131 catches ranking him fourth on the all-time UMass receptions list, despite the fact that he did not start a game until his junior season. He scored 11 touchdowns in his career and had just under 2,000 receiving yards. Cruz was named a first-team All-Colonial Athletic Association wide receiver for the years 2008 and 2009. He is fifth all-time at UMass in career receiving yards (1,958).

== Professional career ==
Pre-draft measurables
| Height | Weight | Arm length | Hand span | 40-yard dash | 10-yard split | 20-yard split | 20-yard shuttle | Three-cone drill | Vertical jump | Broad jump | Bench press |
|---|---|---|---|---|---|---|---|---|---|---|---|
| 5 ft 11 5/8 in (1.82 m) | 206 lb (93 kg) | 31 in (0.79 m) | 9.5 in (0.24 m) | 4.45 s | 1.56 s | 2.60 s | 4.17 s | 6.96 s | 41.5 in (1.05 m) | 10 ft 5 in (3.18 m) | 16 reps |
All values from Boston College's Pro Day.

=== New York Giants ===
Cruz went undrafted in the 2010 NFL draft and was signed the day after the draft by the New York Giants.

==== 2010 season ====
In a preseason game against the New York Jets on August 16, 2010, Cruz helped the Giants win 31–16 by catching six passes for 145 yards and three touchdowns. He finished the preseason leading the NFL with 297 receiving yards, tied for the preseason lead with four touchdown catches, and was selected to the Giants' 53-man regular season roster. He was praised and highlighted by critics for his performance throughout the preseason. He played in three games at the start of the season, before a hamstring injury placed him on injured reserve for the remainder of the year.

==== 2011 season ====
After the Giants lost Steve Smith to free agency, Cruz began the season as the team's fourth wide receiver, before injury to Domenik Hixon led to him receiving a larger role in the Giants win over the Philadelphia Eagles in Week 3. Against a heavily favored Eagles team Cruz made a huge impact. Most highlighted was a Cruz reception made between two defenders in which he took to the end zone for a touchdown. Cruz finished that game with three catches for 110 yards and two touchdowns, the first and second of his career.

In Week 4, with the Giants trailing 27–24 to the Arizona Cardinals in the fourth quarter with under three minutes left to play, Cruz made a reception and went down without being touched at the Cardinals 29-yard line and released the ball as he got up. Believing that Cruz had fumbled since he was never touched, a Cardinal picked up the ball as if it was still alive. The play was whistled dead, but further replay after the game showed Cruz did appear to fumble. On the next play, Eli Manning threw the game-winning touchdown pass to Hakeem Nicks.

In a Week 5 36–25 loss to the Seattle Seahawks, Cruz caught a one-handed 68-yard touchdown reception off a tipped pass. Later in the game, Cruz also lost a fumble, allowing Seattle to tie the game at 22. With the Giants down 29–25 inside the 20, Cruz slipped on his route with the ball in the air and in an attempt to catch the ball, tipped it into the arms of Brandon Browner, who returned it 94 yards for the game clinching touchdown. In Week 11, against the Philadelphia Eagles, he had six receptions for 128 receiving yards and one touchdown. In the following game, on the road against the New Orleans Saints, he had nine receptions for 157 yards and two touchdowns. In the next game against the Green Bay Packers, he had seven receptions for 119 yards in the 38–35 loss.

In Week 16, he tied the NFL record with an explosive 99-yard touchdown catch against the New York Jets. His 89 yards after the catch on the play is the most by a receiver on a 99-yard reception. This catch has constantly been highlighted as the turning point of the Giants 2011 season. In the same game, Cruz also surpassed Amani Toomer as the record holder for the most single-season receiving yards by a Giant.

In Week 17, in a do-or-die game against the Dallas Cowboys for the final playoff slot in the NFC, Cruz had six receptions for 178 yards, including the game's first score with a 74-yard touchdown catch, as well as a fourth quarter, 44-yard catch on third and seven that put the Giants in position to make a field goal that put the Giants up by two scores. The Giants added another touchdown, a 4-yard pass from Manning to Hakeem Nicks, setting a record of 15 fourth quarter touchdown passes in one season for Manning and beat the Cowboys 31–14. Cruz was praised for terrific route running and decimating the Cowboys defense. Cruz finished the season with a single season franchise record 1,536 receiving yards on 82 receptions and nine touchdowns. Cruz was named a second-team All-Pro by the Associated Press. He was named as the Most Improved Player by the PFWA.

Against the San Francisco 49ers in the NFC Championship, Cruz had 10 catches for 142 yards—all in the first half—as the Giants edged the 49ers, 20–17, in overtime to advance to Super Bowl XLVI. The Giants advanced and won the Super Bowl against the New England Patriots for another Super Bowl title. Cruz had four receptions for 25 yards and a touchdown in the game.

Cruz has been popularly known for celebrating nearly every touchdown with a salsa dance. He has stated that it was in honor of his deceased grandmother who taught him how to dance salsa and loved touchdown dances. Cruz's touchdown dance led to him receiving an offer to appear on Dancing with the Stars, which he turned down. He was ranked 39th by his fellow players on the NFL Top 100 Players of 2012.

==== 2012 season ====
In Week 2 of the 2012 season, Cruz had 11 receptions for 179 receiving yards and one touchdown in the 41–34 victory over the Tampa Bay Buccaneers. In Week 4 against the Philadelphia Eagles, he had nine receptions for 109 yards and a touchdown in the 19–17 loss. In the following game, a 41–27 victory over the Cleveland Browns, he had three receiving touchdowns. In Week 7, against Washington, he had seven receptions for 131 yards and a touchdown in the 27–23 victory. In Week 14, against the New Orleans Saints, he had eight receptions for 121 yards and a touchdown in the 52–27 victory. Overall, Cruz finished with 86 receptions for 1,092 receiving yards and ten receiving touchdowns in 16 games and starts. He was named to the Pro Bowl for the 2012 season. He was ranked 58th by his fellow players on the NFL Top 100 Players of 2013.

==== 2013 season ====
On June 14, 2013, Cruz signed his one-year, $2.879 million restricted free agent tender. On July 8, 2013, Cruz signed a five-year, $45.879 million total, contract extension. This made the total a six-year deal, including the free agent tender. Cruz suffered a heel bruise in an August 18 preseason game. Unlike center David Baas's injury, Cruz's heel bruise was deemed minimal in nature. In the Giants' regular season opener against the Dallas Cowboys, he had five receptions for 118 yards and three touchdowns in the 36–31 loss. In the following game against the Denver Broncos, he had eight receptions for 118 yards and a touchdown in the 41–23 loss. In Week 4, against the Kansas City Chiefs, he had ten receptions for 164 yards and a touchdown. In Week 11, against the Green Bay Packers, he had eight receptions for 110 yards in the 27–13 victory. He finished the 2013 season with 73 receptions for 998 receiving yards and four receiving touchdowns in 14 games.

==== 2014 season ====
On October 12, 2014, against the Philadelphia Eagles, Cruz suffered a torn patellar tendon, prematurely ending his 2014 season. In the 2014 season, Cruz produced 23 receptions for 337 receiving yards and a touchdown in six games.

==== 2015 season ====
After a long rehab, Cruz gave an update informing the media he was not yet fully recovered. Cruz returned to training camp in the summer of 2015, but aggravated his calf. The aggravation of his calf further delayed his comeback. From Week 5, Cruz's return was pushed to play in Week 10 against the New England Patriots, but it was later announced that Cruz would undergo surgery on his left calf, and would miss the entire 2015 season. On November 17, 2015, he was placed on season-ending injured reserve.

==== 2016 season ====
After two years of rehab, Cruz returned to NFL play on September 11, 2016, in the Giants opener against the Dallas Cowboys. That afternoon, he scored a game-winning touchdown and celebrated with a salsa dance, his first in two years. Cruz would follow up his performance against the New Orleans Saints with a game winning catch in the final minutes of the game. The Giants went on to win the game by a score of 16–13. On September 17, Cruz was fined $12,154 for excessive celebration related to dancing in the endzone with fellow wideout Odell Beckham Jr., who was also fined for the same reason. Cruz finished the 2016 season with 39 receptions for 586 receiving yards and one receiving touchdown.

Cruz had three receptions for 30 yards in the Giants 38–13 Wild Card Round loss to the Green Bay Packers.

On February 13, 2017, Cruz was released by the Giants.

=== Chicago Bears ===
On May 25, 2017, Cruz signed a one–year deal with the Chicago Bears. He appeared in four preseason games, catching 6 passes for 28 yards and a touchdown. On September 2, 2017, Cruz was released by the Bears.

In 2017, the New York Giants suffered many injuries at the wide receiver position, and there were speculations that the Giants and Cruz would reunite. However, the deal never materialized, and Cruz remained a free agent during the 2017 season.

=== Retirement ===
On August 21, 2018, Cruz announced his retirement and joined ESPN as an analyst. He intended to sign a one-day contract with the New York Giants to officially retire as a member of that team, but never actually did so. Cruz hosted the first season of MTV's The Challenge: Champs vs. Pros.

== NFL career statistics ==
Legend
| | Won the Super Bowl |
| **Bold** | Career high |

=== Regular season ===
| Year | Team | Games | | Receiving | | | | | Rushing | | | | | Fumbles | |
| Year | Team | GP | GS | Rec | Yds | Avg | Lng | TD | Att | Yds | Avg | Lng | TD | Fum | Lost |
|---|---|---|---|---|---|---|---|---|---|---|---|---|---|---|---|
| 2010 | NYG | 3 | 0 | — | — | — | — | — | — | — | — | — | — | — | — |
| 2011 | NYG | **16** | 7 | 82 | **1,536** | **18.7** | **99T** | 9 | **1** | **3** | **3.0** | **3** | 0 | **1** | **1** |
| 2012 | NYG | **16** | **16** | **86** | 1,092 | 12.7 | 80T | **10** | — | — | — | — | — | 0 | 0 |
| 2013 | NYG | 14 | 13 | 73 | 998 | 13.7 | 70T | 4 | — | — | — | — | — | **1** | **1** |
| 2014 | NYG | 6 | 6 | 23 | 337 | 14.7 | 61 | 1 | — | — | — | — | — | 0 | 0 |
| 2015 | NYG | 0 | 0 | Did not play due to injury | | | | | | | | | | | |
| 2016 | NYG | 15 | 12 | 39 | 586 | 15.0 | 48 | 1 | — | — | — | — | — | **1** | **1** |
| Career | | 70 | 54 | 303 | 4,549 | 15.0 | 99 | 25 | 1 | 3 | 3.0 | 3 | 0 | 3 | 3 |

=== Postseason ===
| Season | Team | Games | | Receiving | | | | | Rushing | | | | | Fumbles | |
| Season | Team | GP | GS | Rec | Yds | Avg | Lng | TD | Att | Yds | Avg | Lng | TD | Fum | Lost |
|---|---|---|---|---|---|---|---|---|---|---|---|---|---|---|---|
| 2011 | NYG | **4** | **4** | **21** | **269** | **12.8** | **36** | **1** | — | — | — | — | — | 0 | 0 |
| 2016 | NYG | 1 | 1 | 3 | 30 | 10.0 | 17 | 0 | — | — | — | — | — | 0 | 0 |
| Career | | 5 | 5 | 24 | 299 | 12.5 | 36 | 1 | 0 | 0 | 0.0 | 0 | 0 | 0 | 0 |

== Personal life ==
Cruz has a daughter, Kennedy, with Elaina Watley. He was in a relationship with actress Karrueche Tran from November 2017 through January 2021. In the summer of 2010, Cruz founded the "Young Whales" clothing line with former teammate Nate Collins. Cruz and former teammate Osi Umenyiora were among the brand's original models.

Cruz's college roommate was then-UMass quarterback and current Jacksonville Jaguars head coach, Liam Coen, whom Cruz credits as one of the first to recognize his talents as a wide receiver.

Following the shooting at Sandy Hook Elementary School on December 14, 2012, Cruz honored one of the victims, Jack Pinto, age 6. Pinto was a fan of Cruz, who wore a tribute on his shoes in the game against the Atlanta Falcons two days after the massacre. In permanent marker, one shoe read "R.I.P. Jack Pinto" and the other "Jack Pinto My Hero." On December 19, 2012, he visited the Pinto family in Newtown, saying, "I felt like it was only right that I pay my respects to him and be as comforting to that family as much as I can." Cruz gave the cleats and gloves he wore in the Falcons' game to Pinto's brother, Ben.

== See also ==
- List of Afro-Latinos
