= Wunmi Mosaku =

Nigerian-British actress (born 1986)

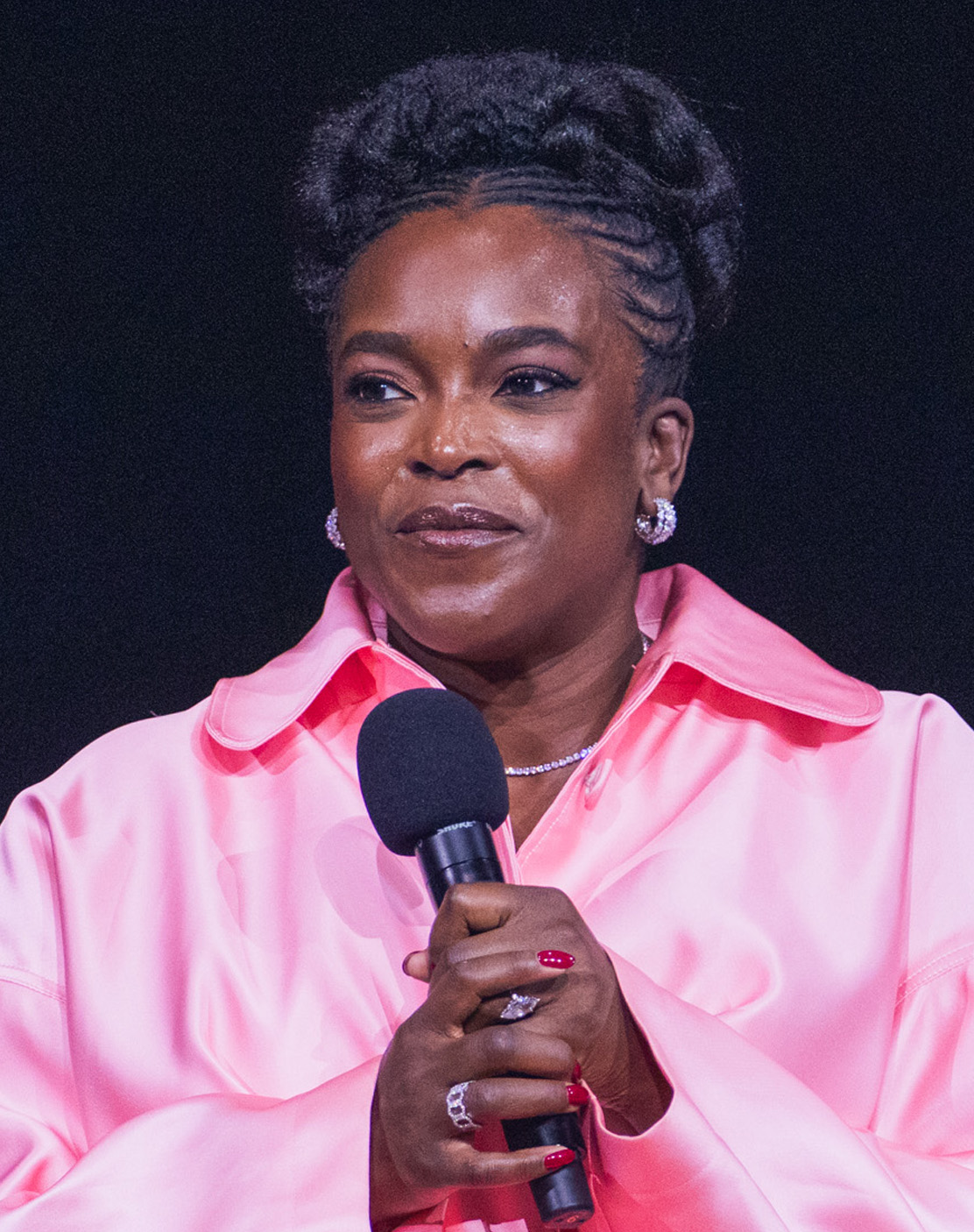
- Mosaku in 2025
- Born: Oluwunmi Olapeju Mosaku; 31 July 1986 (age 40); Zaria, Nigeria
- Citizenship: Nigeria; United Kingdom
- Education: Royal Academy of Dramatic Art (BA)
- Occupation: Actress
- Years active: 2006–present
- Spouse: Tash Moseley (m. 2020)
- Children: 2

Oluwunmi Olapeju Mosaku (born 31 July 1986), known professionally as Wunmi Mosaku, is a Nigerian and British actress. She rose to prominence for her roles as Joy in the BBC Two miniseries Moses Jones (2009) and Holly Lawson in the ITV series Vera (2011–2012). She won the BAFTA TV Award for Best Supporting Actress for her role as Gloria Taylor in the TV film Damilola, Our Loved Boy (2016). In 2019, she appeared in the fifth season of Luther, followed by her role as Ruby Baptiste in HBO's Lovecraft Country (2020). She portrayed the character Hunter B-15 in the Marvel Cinematic Universe (MCU) Disney+ series Loki (2021–2023) and reprised the role in the film Deadpool & Wolverine (2024).

Mosaku was nominated for the BAFTA Award for Best Actress in a Leading Role and won the British Independent Film Award for Best Performance by an Actress in a British Independent Film for her role as Rial in the film His House (2020). For her performance as Annie in the 2025 horror film Sinners, Mosaku won the BAFTA Award for Best Actress in a Supporting Role and Gotham Independent Film Award for Outstanding Supporting Performance and was nominated for an Academy Award, a Critics' Choice Movie Award, and an Actor Award.

== Early life ==
Mosaku was born in Zaria, Nigeria, to Yoruba parents who were both professors. When she was one year old, the family emigrated to Manchester, England, where she was raised and attended the Trinity Church of England High School and Xaverian Sixth Form College. She sang for eleven years in the Manchester Girls Choir. Her mother Irene started a business and her father eventually returned to Nigeria. She has two older sisters. Mosaku studied acting at the Royal Academy of Dramatic Art (RADA), graduating in 2007 with a BA degree in Acting (H Level).

== Career ==
Mosaku made her professional stage debut in 2007 at the Arcola Theatre in a production of Pedro Calderón de la Barca's The Great Theatre of the World. Her other theatre credits including Rough Crossings (2008), directed by Rupert Goold and based on the book by Simon Schama, at the Lyric Hammersmith; The Vertical Hour (2010) by David Hare and Truth and Reconciliation (2011), both at the Royal Court Theatre.

In 2008, she appeared in the first of the UNDEREXPOSED exhibitions at the National Portrait Gallery, designed to raise the profile of black role models and celebrates the talent that exists among the Black British community. Her photo also appeared on Commercial Way, Peckham, London, as part of the exhibition. In 2009, she starred in the BBC Two series Moses Jones, for which she won Best Actress in a Miniseries at the Rome Fiction Festival.

Mosaku featured on the front cover of Screen International magazine June–July 2009, as one of the UK Stars of Tomorrow, and in 2011 was featured in Nylon's 2011 Young Hollywood issue. In 2010, she was named one of The Seven Fresh Faces of Toronto International Film Festival, for I Am Slave, in which she starred. She plays Malia, a girl who has been kidnapped from her village in Sudan and sold into slavery. Her performance garnered several awards: Best Actress at the Birmingham Black Film Festival, Best Onscreen Performance at the Cultural Diversity Awards, and Best Female Performance at the Screen Nation Awards.

In 2011, Mosaku appeared in Vera as Holly Lawson. In 2015, Mosaku played the part of Quentina, a traffic warden, in the three-part BBC series Capital, based on John Lanchester's novel of the same name. In 2016, she appeared in Playtest, an episode of the anthology series Black Mirror. She won the British Academy Television Award for Best Supporting Actress for playing Gloria Taylor in the television film Damilola, Our Loved Boy (2016).

In 2025, Mosaku appeared as the hoodoo healer Annie in Ryan Coogler's vampire film Sinners. The New York Times called her performance "the soulful core" of the movie. She later received a nomination for the Academy Award for Best Supporting Actress for her performance at the 98th Academy Awards. Sinners led the field with a record 16 total nominations, including Mosaku's supporting acting nomination.

== Personal life ==
When asked to list her personal heroes, Mosaku included her grandmother Anike Adisa, whom she described as having "taught me so many lessons"; actor Albert Finney, who was her inspiration for attending RADA; her colleague and former instructor at RADA, William Gaskill; Paul Newman, whom she admired, not just for his acting, but also for his philanthropic efforts with Newman's Own; and Oprah Winfrey, whom Mosaku considers "a superwoman".

Mosaku moved to Los Angeles, California in 2018, and married American talent and literary manager Tash Moseley two years later. They welcomed a daughter in 2024, and a son in 2026. Mosaku has been taking Yoruba language lessons since 2020.

=== Political views ===
During Donald Trump's second presidential term, Mosaku publicly criticized the administration's immigration enforcement policies on various occasions. In a February 2026 interview with The Sunday Times, she stated that she was unable to celebrate her Oscar nomination in light of recent deaths connected to federal immigration enforcement in Minnesota, describing the political climate as "truly dystopian."

== Filmography ==
=== Film ===
Year	Film	Role	Director	Notes
2006	The Women of Troy	Helen of Troy	Phil Hawkins	
2010	Honeymooner	Seema	Col Spector	
2010	Womb	Erica	Benedek Fliegauf	
2012	Citadel	Marie	Ciarán Foy	
2013	Philomena	Young nun	Stephen Frears	
2016	Batman v Superman: Dawn of Justice	Kahina Ziri	Zack Snyder	
2016	Fantastic Beasts and Where to Find Them	Beryl	David Yates	
2018	Leading Lady Parts	Herself	Jessica Swale	Short film
2019	Sweetness in the Belly	Amina	Zeresenay Berhane Mehari	
2020	His House	Rial	Remi Weekes	
2022	Call Jane	Gwen	Phyllis Nagy	
2022	Alice, Darling	Sophie	Mary Nighy	
2024	Deadpool & Wolverine	Hunter B-15	Shawn Levy	
2025	Sinners	Annie	Ryan Coogler	
2026	The Social Reckoning	Raya	Aaron Sorkin	
2026	The Life and Deaths of Wilson Shedd	TBA	Tim Blake Nelson	Post-production
TBA	This Is How It Goes	Belinda	Idris Elba	Post-production

=== Television ===
Year	Show	Role	Notes
2007	Sold	Firefighter	Episode #1.5
2008	Never Better	Server	Episode: "First Week Euphoria"
2008	Doctors	Nurse Kelly Strathairn	Episode: "Who Do You Think You Are Kidding?"
2008	The Bill	Sophie Oduya	Episode: "Trial and Error: Part 1"
2009	Father & Son	Stacey Cox	Miniseries
2009	Moses Jones	Joy	Miniseries
2010	One Night in Emergency	Beautiful nurse	Television film
2010	Silent Witness	Charlie Gibbs	4 episodes (series 13)
2010	I Am Slave	Malia	Television film
2010	Law & Order: UK	Tamika Vincent	Episode: "Survivor"
2011	32 Brinkburn Street	Joy	5 episodes
2011	Stolen	Sonia Carey	Television film
2011	The Body Farm	Rosa Gilbert	Miniseries
2011–2012	Vera	DC Holly Lawson	5 episodes (series 1–2)
2012	Blackout	Millie Caswell	Miniseries
2013	Dancing on the Edge	Carla	Miniseries
2013	Jo	Angélique Alassane	Miniseries
2013	Truckers	Danielle	Episode #1.3
2014	In the Flesh	Maxine Martin	6 episodes (series 2)
2015	Capital	Quentina	Miniseries
2015	Don't Take My Baby	Belinda	Television film
2016	Black Mirror	Katie	Episode: "Playtest"
2016	Scott & Bailey	Rae Milton	2 episodes (series 5)
2016	Damilola, Our Loved Boy	Gloria Taylor	Television film
2017	Guerrilla	Kenya	Miniseries
2017	Fearless	DCS Olivia Greenwood	Miniseries
2017	The End of the F***ing World	DC Teri Darego	5 episodes (series 2)
2018	Kiri	DI Vanessa Mercer	Miniseries
2018	On the Edge	Tessa	Episode: "Through the Gates"
2019	Luther	DS Catherine Halliday	4 episodes (series 5)
2019	Animal Babies: First Year on Earth	Narrator	Voice; docuseries
2019	Temple	Mercy King	Miniseries
2020	Lovecraft Country	Ruby Baptiste	10 episodes
2021–2023	Loki	Hunter B-15 / Dr. Verity Willis	11 episodes
2022	We Own This City	Nicole Steele	Miniseries
2023	Scavengers Reign	Azi	Voice; 12 episodes
2024	Boarders	Grace	4 episodes (series 2)
2024	Passenger	Riya Ajunwa	6 episodes

== Radio ==
- Drama on 3: The Vertical Hour (2008) on BBC Radio 3, as Terri Scholes
- Drama on 4: Normal and Nat (2009) on BBC Radio 4, as Shanice
- Drama on 4: Amazing Grace (2010) on BBC Radio 4, as Grace

== Awards and nominations ==
Year	Award	Category	Work	Result	Ref.
2009	Rome Fiction Festival	Best Actress in a Mini-series	Moses Jones	Won	
2017	BAFTA TV Awards	Best Supporting Actress	Damilola, Our Loved Boy	Won	
2018	Royal Television Society Programme Awards	Actor: Female	Damilola, Our Loved Boy	Nominated	
2021	BAFTA Film Awards	Best Actress in a Leading Role	His House	Nominated	
2021	British Independent Film Awards	Best Performance by an Actress	His House	Won	
2021	Screen Actors Guild Awards	Outstanding Ensemble in a Drama Series	Lovecraft Country	Nominated	
2021	Hollywood Critics Association TV Awards	Best Supporting Actress in a Broadcast Network or Cable Series, Drama	Lovecraft Country	Nominated	
2021	Critics' Choice Super Awards	Best Actress in a Horror Series	Lovecraft Country	Nominated	
2021	Critics' Choice Television Awards	Best Supporting Actress in a Drama Series	Lovecraft Country	Nominated	
2025	Alliance of Women Film Journalists	Best Supporting Actress	Sinners	Won	
2025	Alliance of Women Film Journalists	Best Breakthrough performance	Sinners	Nominated	
2025	Astra Midseason Movie Awards	Best Supporting Actress	Sinners	Runner-up	
2025	African-American Film Critics Association	Best Supporting Actress	Sinners	Won	
2025	Austin Film Critics Association	Best Supporting Actress	Sinners	Nominated	
2025	Chicago Film Critics Association	Best Supporting Actress	Sinners	Nominated	
2025	Critics' Choice Super Awards	Best Actress in a Horror Movie	Sinners	Nominated	
2025	Dallas–Fort Worth Film Critics Association	Best Supporting Actress	Sinners	Nominated	
2025	Fangoria Chainsaw Awards	Best Supporting Performance	Sinners	Nominated	
2025	Florida Film Critics Circle	Best Supporting Actress	Sinners	Runner-up	
2025	Gotham Film Awards	Outstanding Supporting Performance	Sinners	Won	
2025	Gotham Film Awards	Ensemble Tribute (Note: Shared with Michael B. Jordan, Hailee Steinfeld, Miles Caton, Jack O'Connell, Jayme Lawson, Omar Benson Miller, Buddy Guy, Li Jun Li, and Delroy Lindo)	Sinners	Won	
2025	Indiana Film Journalists Association	Best Ensemble Acting	Sinners	Won	
2025	Kansas City Film Critics Circle	Best Supporting Actress	Sinners	Nominated	
2025	Michigan Movie Critics Guild	Best Supporting Actress	Sinners	Won	
2025	Michigan Movie Critics Guild	Best Ensemble	Sinners	Won	
2025	New York Film Critics Online	Best Supporting Actress	Sinners	Nominated	
2025	New York Film Critics Online	Best Ensemble	Sinners	Won	
2025	North Texas Film Critics Association	Best Supporting Actress	Sinners	Nominated	
2025	Online Association Of Female Film Critics	Best Supporting Female	Sinners	Won	
2025	Philadelphia Film Critics Circle	Best Supporting Actress	Sinners	Runner-up	
2025	Phoenix Critics Circle	Best Supporting Actress	Sinners	Nominated	
2025	Portland Critics Association	Best Supporting Performance	Sinners	Won	
2025	San Diego Film Critics Society	Best Supporting Actress	Sinners	Nominated	
2025	San Diego Film Critics Society	Best Performance by an Ensemble	Sinners	Runner-up	
2025	San Francisco Bay Area Film Critics Circle	Best Supporting Actress	Sinners	Nominated	
2025	Seattle Film Critics Society	Best Actress in a Supporting Role	Sinners	Won	
2025	Southeastern Film Critics Association	Best Ensemble	Sinners	Won	
2025	UK Film Critics Association	Best Supporting Actress	Sinners	Won	
2025	Washington D.C. Area Film Critics Association	Best Supporting Actress	Sinners	Nominated	
2025	Washington D.C. Area Film Critics Association	Best Ensemble	Sinners	Won	
2025	Women Film Critics Circle	Best Screen Couple (Note: Shared with Michael B. Jordan)	Sinners	Won	
2026	Academy Awards	Best Supporting Actress	Sinners	Nominated	
2026	Actor Awards	Outstanding Cast in a Motion Picture (Note: Shared with Michael B. Jordan, Hailee Steinfeld, Miles Caton, Jack O'Connell, Jayme Lawson, Omar Benson Miller, Buddy Guy, and Delroy Lindo)	Sinners	Won	
2026	Actor Awards	Outstanding Female Actor in a Supporting Role	Sinners	Nominated	
2026	Astra Film Awards	Best Supporting Actress – Drama	Sinners	Nominated	
2026	BAFTA Film Awards	Best Actress in a Supporting Role	Sinners	Won	
2026	Black Reel Awards	Outstanding Supporting Performance	Sinners	Won	
2026	Chicago Indie Critics	Best Supporting Actress	Sinners	Nominated	
2026	Critics' Choice Movie Awards	Best Supporting Actress	Sinners	Nominated	
2026	Critics' Choice Movie Awards	Best Acting Ensemble (Note: Shared with Michael B. Jordan, Hailee Steinfeld, Miles Caton, Jack O'Connell, Jayme Lawson, Omar Benson Miller, Li Jun Li, and Delroy Lindo)	Sinners	Won	
2026	Columbus Film Critics Association	Best Supporting Performance	Sinners	Nominated	
2026	Denver Film Critics Society	Best Supporting Actress	Sinners	Nominated	
2026	Dorian Awards	Supporting Film Performance of the Year	Sinners	Nominated	
2026	Greater Western New York Film Critics Association	Best Supporting Actress	Sinners	Won	
2026	Houston Film Critics Society	Best Supporting Actress	Sinners	Nominated	
2026	Latino Entertainment Journalists Association	Best Supporting Actress	Sinners	Nominated	
2026	London Critics Circle Film Awards	Supporting Actress of the Year	Sinners	Nominated	
2026	Minnesota Film Critics Association	Best Supporting Actress	Sinners	Nominated	
2026	Music City Film Critics Association	Best Supporting Actress	Sinners	Nominated	
2026	National Society of Film Critics	Best Supporting Actress	Sinners	3rd place	
2026	NAACP Image Awards	Outstanding Supporting Actress in a Motion Picture	Sinners	Won	
2026	North Carolina Film Critics Association	Best Supporting Actress	Sinners	Nominated	
2026	North Dakota Film Society	Best Supporting Actress	Sinners	Nominated	
2026	Online Film Critics Society	Online Film Critics Society Award for Best Supporting Actress	Sinners	Nominated	
2026	Online Film & Television Association	Best Supporting Actress	Sinners	Nominated	
2026	Pittsburgh Film Critics Association	Best Supporting Actor	Sinners	Runner-up	
2026	Puerto Rico Critics Association	Best Supporting Actress	Sinners	Nominated	
2026	Satellite Awards	Best Actress in a Supporting Role	Sinners	Nominated	
2026	Utah Film Critics Association	Best Supporting Performance – Female	Sinners	Runner-up	
