= Euros Lyn =

Welsh film and television director (born 1971)

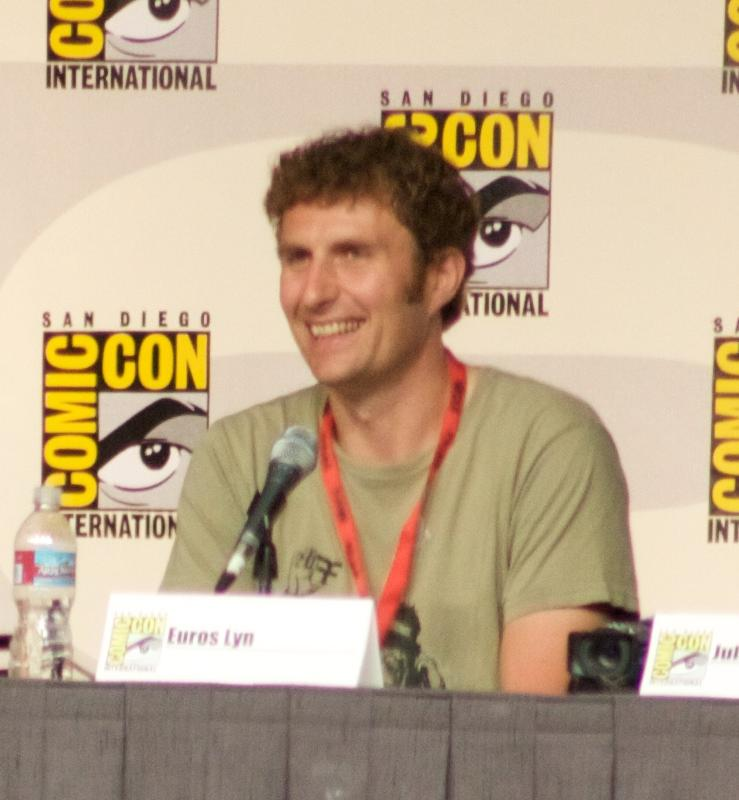
- Lyn at the 2009 San Diego Comic-Con
- Born: 1971 (age 54–55); Cardiff, Wales
- Occupations: Film and television director
- Years active: 1997–present
- Spouse: Craig Hughes (m. 2015)

Euros Lyn (Welsh pronunciation: [ˈɛɨ̯.rɔs ˈlɪn]; born 1971) is a Welsh film and television director, best known for his work in Doctor Who, Sherlock, Black Mirror, Daredevil, His Dark Materials and Heartstopper.

== Early life ==
Lyn was born in Cardiff. His family moved to north Wales and later back south to Swansea. He was educated at Ysgol Gyfun Ystalyfera and studied Drama at the University of Manchester.

== Career ==
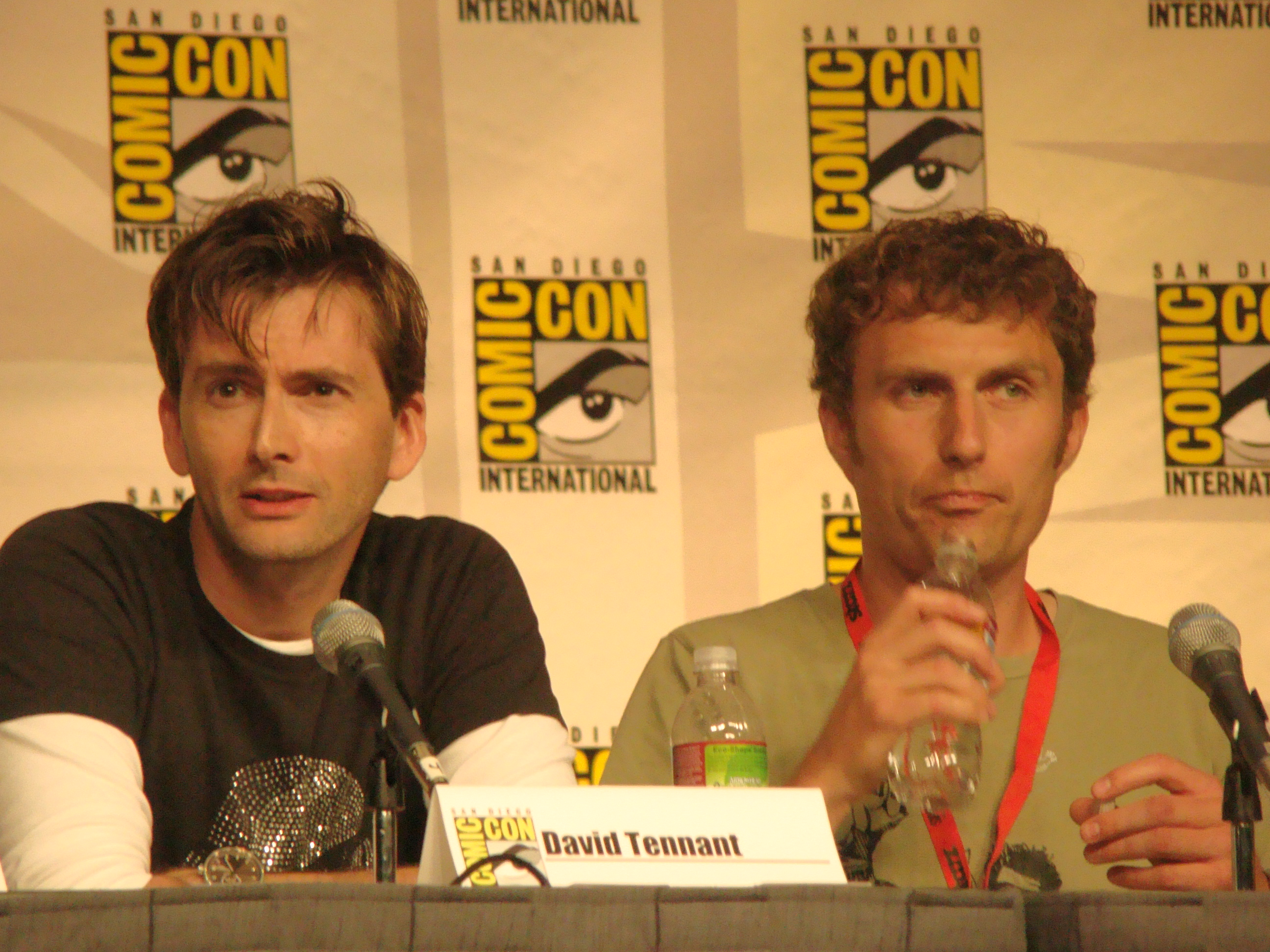
Euros Lyn (at right) with actor David Tennant at 2009 San Diego Comic-Con

Lyn started his career directing Welsh-language programmes broadcast on S4C, such as Pam Fi Duw?, Iechyd Da and Y Glas.

He directed nine episodes of Doctor Who and won the BAFTA Cymru award for Best Director for "Silence in the Library" and the 2007 Hugo Award for Best Dramatic Presentation, Short Form for "The Girl in the Fireplace". He also directed David Tennant's last episodes of Doctor Who.

In 2007, he directed the pilot of George Gently, based on the Inspector Gently novels by Alan Hunter, for BBC One. He has also directed four episodes of the long-running BBC medical drama Casualty.

In 2008, he directed the third series of Torchwood, a five part mini-series called Children of Earth.

Lyn won the BAFTA Cymru for Best Director three times, most recently for the first series of Sherlock with Benedict Cumberbatch and Martin Freeman, which also won RTS and BAFTA Best Drama awards. He also directed Fifteen Million Merits, an episode of the anthology series Black Mirror for Channel 4, which won an International Emmy for Best Drama Series. In 2013 he directed three episodes of Broadchurch with David Tennant and Olivia Colman, and a further three episodes of the second instalment of BAFTA-winning series Last Tango in Halifax, after directing three episodes of the first series.

The crime series Happy Valley, which Lyn directed, was shown on BBC One in 2014. In 2015 the show won the BAFTA award for Best Drama Series. He also directed episodes of Gracepoint (FOX USA), Cucumber (Channel 4) and Daredevil (Netflix USA).

In 2015 Lyn received the Siân Phillips Award at the BAFTA Cymru ceremony for his contributions to the industry. In the same year, he directed the three-part BBC series Capital based on John Lanchester's novel of the same name.

In 2016 Lyn directed his first feature film, the Welsh-language Y Llyfrgell, which was released with English subtitles as The Library Suicides and was based on Fflur Dafydd's book Y Llyfrgell. The film starred Ryland Teifi, Catrin Stewart, Dyfan Dwyfor and Sharon Haf Morgan.

In 2020 Lyn directed the film Dream Horse based on a true story and starring Toni Colette and Joanna Paige.

== Personal life ==
A Welsh speaker, Lyn resides in Llangennith, Gower, with his husband Craig Hughes.

== Credits ==
Year	Title	Notes	Broadcaster
1997	Pam fi Duw?	Series 1	S4C
2000	Diwrnod Hollol Mindblowing Heddiw (cy)	TV movie	S4C
2000	Belonging	4 episodes	BBC One Wales
2002	A Mind to Kill	Episode: "The Little House in the Forest"	Channel 5/S4C
2002–2003	Casualty	4 episodes	BBC One
2004	Cutting It	1 episode	BBC One
2005–2006; 2008–2010	Doctor Who	12 episodes	BBC One
2005	All About George	2 episodes	ITV1
2006	Jane Hall	3 episodes	ITV1
2007	George Gently	Pilot	BBC One
2008	Fairy Tales	Episode: "Billy Goat"	BBC One
2008	Phoo Action	Pilot	BBC Three
2009	Torchwood	5 episodes	BBC One
2010	Sherlock	Episode: "The Blind Banker"	BBC One
2010	Upstairs, Downstairs	2 episodes	BBC One
2011	Black Mirror	Episode: "Fifteen Million Merits"	Channel 4
2012–2013	Last Tango in Halifax	6 episodes	BBC One
2013	Broadchurch	3 episodes	ITV1
2014	Happy Valley	3 episodes	BBC One
2014	Gracepoint	2 episodes	Fox
2015	Cucumber	2 episodes	Channel 4
2015–2016	Daredevil	2 episodes	Netflix
2015	Capital	Series	BBC One
2016	Y Llyfrgell / The Library Suicides	Film	S4C, Blinc Media
2016	Damilola, Our Loved Boy	TV movie	BBC One
2017	Let the Right One In	Pilot	TNT
2018	Kiri	Miniseries	Channel 4
2019	His Dark Materials	Episode: "The Daemon-Cage"	BBC One
2020	Dream Horse	Film	
2022–2023	Heartstopper	16 episodes	Netflix
2024	The Radleys	Film	
2025	Wayward	4 episodes	Netflix
2026	Pride and Prejudice		Netflix
