= Robert Emms =

British actor (born 1986)

- Born: Robert James MacPherson; 20 May 1986 (age 39); Horley, Surrey, England
- Occupation: Actor
- Years active: 2007–present

Robert Emms (born Robert James MacPherson; 20 May 1986) is a British film, stage and television actor, known for portraying Pythagoras in the BBC One fantasy-adventure series Atlantis, Supervisor Lonni Jung in the Star Wars series Andor, and Leonid Toptunov in the HBO miniseries Chernobyl.

== Early life ==
Emms was born in Horley, Surrey, England. He went to a local secondary school, Oakwood School, Horley. He studied at the BRIT School for Performing Arts and Technology from 2002 to 2004, and then the London Academy of Music and Dramatic Art (LAMDA) from 2004 to 2007.

== Career ==
In March 2009, Emms played the lead role of Albert in the National Theatre's production of War Horse. After Steven Spielberg saw him in War Horse at the New London Theatre, he was cast as David Lyons in Spielberg's film adaptation of the play.

In June 2011, Screen International named him as a 'Star of Tomorrow'.

His other film work includes Kick-Ass 2 alongside Jim Carrey, and Rick 'Broken' Buckley in Broken directed by Rufus Norris for BBC films. He appeared as the Elizabethan playwright Thomas Dekker in Anonymous directed by Roland Emmerich, in Tarsem Singh's version of the Brothers Grimm's Snow White, Mirror Mirror with Julia Roberts, and in the BAFTA-nominated film The Arbor, directed by Clio Barnard. More recently he has portrayed Vitas Gerulaitis in the film Borg vs McEnroe directed by Janus Metz Pederson (alongside Shia LaBeouf).

Emms' notable television appearances include Happy Valley by Sally Wainwright, The Street by Jimmy McGovern, and Scott & Bailey. In 2015, Emms played the part of Smitty, the artistic grandson of Petunia Howe, in the three-part BBC series Capital based on John Lanchester's novel of the same name. He portrayed John Gerard in the 2017 BBC series Gunpowder alongside Kit Harington and Liv Tyler. He also played Pythagoras in the series Atlantis for the BBC.

Emms played Jack in Jurassic World: Fallen Kingdom (2018) and the third season of Jurassic World Camp Cretaceous (2021).

== Filmography ==
=== Film ===
Year	Title	Role	Notes
2010	The Arbor	Young David	
2011	War Horse	David Lyons	
2011	Anonymous	Thomas Dekker	
2012	Broken	Rick Buckley	
2012	Mirror, Mirror	Charles Renbock	
2013	Kick-Ass 2	Insect Man	
2013	The Selfish Giant	Phil	
2017	Borg/McEnroe	Vitas Gerulaitis	
2017	Apostasy	Steven	
2018	Jurassic World: Fallen Kingdom	Tech Merc (Jack)	
2022	This Is Christmas	Paul	
2023	Starve Acre	Steven	
2025	The Choral	Robert Horner	
2025	Bad Apples	Josh	
2027	Blood on Snow †	Klein	Post-production

=== Television ===
Year	Title	Role	Notes
2008	Shangri-La	Horatio	1 episode
2008	Waking the Dead	Steo	1 episode
2008	The Wrong Door	Colin/Smee	2 episodes
2009	The Street	Calum Miller	1 episode
2009	Monday Monday	Tom	1 episode
2011	Scott & Bailey	Luke Farrell	1 episode
2013–2015	Atlantis	Pythagoras	Main role, 25 episodes
2015	Capital	Smitty	Miniseries, 3 episodes
2016	The Living and the Dead	Peter	1 episode
2016	Happy Valley	Daryl Garrs	Main role, 4 episodes (Series 2)
2017	Gunpowder	Father John Gerard	Recurring role, 3 episodes
2019	Cleaning Up	Glynn	Main role
2019	Chernobyl	Leonid Toptunov	Miniseries, 5 episodes
2019	His Dark Materials	Thomas	6 episodes
2021	Jurassic World Camp Cretaceous	Tech Merc (Jack) (voice)	Season 3, 1 episode
2021	War of the Worlds	Micah	2 episodes
2022	Four Lives	Ricky	Miniseries, 3 episodes
2022–2025	Andor	Supervisor Lonni Jung	10 episodes
2023	The Reckoning	Ray Teret	Miniseries, 3 episodes
2024	Kaos	Anatole	3 episodes
2024	Sherwood	Samuel Warner	6 episodes

== Theatre ==
Year	Title	Role	Director	Company
2007	The Six-Days World	Tom	Jamie Harper	Finborough Theatre
2008	The Glee Club	Colin	Roger Haines	Library Theatre, Manchester
2008	Shangri-La	Horatio	Mark Ravenhill	Roundhouse
2009–10	War Horse	Albert Narracott	Marianne Elliott and Tom Morris	National Theatre at New London Theatre
2009	War Horse	Billy Narracott	Marianne Elliott and Tom Morris	National Theatre at New London Theatre
2019–20	Ravens: Spassky vs. Fischer	Bobby Fischer	Annabelle Comyn	Hampstead Theatre
2023–24	The Homecoming	Teddy	Matthew Dunster	Young Vic
