= The Debt to Pleasure =

1996 novel by John Lanchester

- Author: John Lanchester
- Language: English
- Publication date: 1996

The Debt to Pleasure is a 1996 novel by John Lanchester published by Picador. The novel won the 1996 Whitbread Book Award in the First Novel category and the 1997 Hawthornden Prize. It was described as a skilful and wickedly funny account of the life of a loquacious Englishman named Tarquin Winot, revealed through his thoughts on cuisine as he undertakes a mysterious journey around France. The revelations become more and more shocking as the truth about the narrator becomes apparent.

== Content ==
The novel centres on the character of Tarquin Winot (originally Rodney Winot), an erudite English writer, hedonist, and gastronome, who is nonetheless a profoundly unreliable narrator. Its structure is divided into four separate sections, all of which correspond to different seasons of the year. In each section there are recipes in addition to the narrative.

It opens with the observation that "This is not a conventional cookbook", taken from a comment made by Bertrand Russell regarding the work of Ludwig Wittgenstein. It then features Winot driving through France as he travels in the direction (so he tells us) of his house in Provence. During the journey he provides long disquisitions upon the art and food of the Normandy and Brittany regions of France, discussions of famous chefs and gastronomists such as Brillat-Savarin and Elizabeth David, and a wide variety of classical allusions and quotations. When he finally arrives at his house he sets up electronic surveillance equipment, follows a young couple, and grants an interview with a biographer of his elder brother, Bartholomew. In the course of the novel, a darker and more sinister motive for Winot's journey is revealed.
