= The 7.39 =

2014 British TV romantic drama film

- The 7:39 DVD cover
- Genre: Drama
- Written by: David Nicholls
- Directed by: John Alexander
- Starring: David Morrissey; Sheridan Smith; Olivia Colman; Sean Maguire
- Theme music composer: Adrian Johnston
- Country of origin: United Kingdom
- Original language: English
- No. of series: 1
- No. of episodes: 2

Production
- Producer: Lynn Horsford
- Cinematography: Matt Gray BSC
- Editor: Roy Sharman
- Running time: 60 minutes
- Production company: Carnival Films

Original release
- Network: BBC One; BBC One HD
- Release: 6 January – 7 January 2014

The 7.39 is a British drama television film that was broadcast in two parts on BBC One on 6 January and 7 January 2014. This romantic drama from Carnival Films was written by David Nicholls.

== Plot ==
Carl Matthews (David Morrissey) commutes by train to London where he works in a property management office under a boss who is pressuring him to dismiss an employee. He has a kind and supportive wife Maggie (Olivia Colman) and two teenage children who he feels do not appreciate him.

One morning he complains to a woman called Sally (Sheridan Smith) that she has taken his seat on the train. He later apologises to her and they start chatting, a relationship develops and she reveals that she is divorced but about to marry again, although scenes with her fiancé (Sean Maguire) suggest she is going cold on the idea. She works at a health club and Carl joins it so that he can see more of her. They fall in love and one evening when the train is not running they spend the night together at a hotel. The second part of the drama deals with the repercussions of their affair.

== Cast ==
- David Morrissey as Carl Matthews
- Sheridan Smith as Sally Thorn
- Olivia Colman as Maggie Matthews
- Sean Maguire as Ryan Cole
- Bill Milner as Adam Matthews
- Izzy Meikle-Small as Charlotte Matthews
- Ben Fox as Commuter
- Lashana Lynch as Kerry Wright
- Justin Salinger as Grant Findlay
- Thomas Morrison as Martin Dawson
- Raj Ghatak as Hotel Receptionist

== Production ==
BBC One announced the series on 29 April 2013. On 1 May 2013 Carnival Films announced that filming had begun. Filming took place on the South West Trains network, including London Waterloo station and Woking railway station. Other scenes were filmed in Twickenham, London and Long Ditton, Surrey. The 7.39 was produced by Lynn Horsford, directed by John Alexander and executive produced by Gareth Neame and Sally Woodward Gentle. The original score was by Adrian Johnston.

== Reception ==
Overnight figures showed that the first episode on 6 January 2014 was watched by 22.6% of the viewing audience for that time, with 5.66 million watching it. The second episode on the following day was watched by 23.9% of the viewing audience for the time with 5.77 million watching it.
