= Viva Laughlin =

American comedy drama television series

- Intertitle
- Genre: Dramedy; Musical
- Created by: Peter Bowker; Bob Lowry
- Starring: Lloyd Owen; Mädchen Amick; Ellen Woglom; Carter Jenkins; Eric Winter; D. B. Woodside; Hugh Jackman; Melanie Griffith; P. J. Byrne
- Theme music composer: Trevor Morris
- Composers: Patrick Miligan; John E. Nordstrom
- Country of origin: United States
- Original language: English
- No. of seasons: 1
- No. of episodes: 2 (5 unaired)

Production
- Executive producers: Peter Bowker; Hugh Jackman; Bob Lowry; Gabriele Muccino; John Palermo; Steven S. DeKnight; Paul Telegdy
- Producer: Don Kurt
- Cinematography: Paul M. Sommers
- Camera setup: Single-camera
- Running time: 42 minutes
- Production companies: BBC Worldwide; CBS Paramount Network Television; Seed Productions; Sony Pictures Television

Original release
- Network: CBS
- Release: October 18 – October 21, 2007

Viva Laughlin is an American musical comedy drama television series adapted by Bob Lowry and Peter Bowker (creator of the original series) from the popular BBC serial Blackpool, and taking its name from the latter program's sequel Viva Blackpool. Lowry and Bowker also served as executive producers alongside Hugh Jackman, John Palermo, Paul Telegdy, and Gabriele Muccino. The latter also directed the pilot. It was filmed on location in part at the Morongo Casino Resort & Spa in Cabazon, California for most of the inside casino shots.

Produced by BBC Worldwide, CBS Paramount Network Television, Sony Pictures Television, and Seed Productions, the series was greenlit and given a thirteen-episode order on May 14, 2007. Excerpts from the series were aired in subsequent previews throughout the CBS telecast of the 61st Annual Tony Awards on June 10, 2007. CBS aired a preview of the pilot on October 18, 2007 following an episode of CSI: Crime Scene Investigation before broadcasting its official season premiere on October 21, 2007 in its regular timeslot on Sunday nights at 8:00/7:00c, following 60 Minutes.

CBS cancelled Viva Laughlin on October 22, 2007 after airing two episodes, with the Nine Network (in Jackman's home country of Australia) following suit the next day by canceling the show after airing only one episode. Both CBS and Nine filled the show's time slot with repeat episodes of CSI, with The Amazing Race then taking Viva Laughlin's place on CBS on November 4. There are still no plans to air the remaining episodes as of October 2020.

== Plot ==
Viva Laughlin is a mystery drama musical about businessman Ripley Holden, whose ambition is to run a casino in Laughlin, Nevada. It occasionally has the actors break into contemporary song. Ripley has invested all his money into opening a casino that is nowhere near completion, when his financing suddenly falls through. Needing an investor, Ripley approaches his rival, wealthy casino owner Nicky Fontana; but Fontana wants to own the casino himself, and Ripley turns down the deal. Ripley becomes embroiled in a murder investigation after the body of his ex-business partner is found at his casino.

== Cast ==
- Lloyd Owen as Ripley Holden
- Mädchen Amick as Natalie Holden
- Ellen Woglom as Cheyenne Holden
- Carter Jenkins as Jack Holden
- Eric Winter as Peter Carlyle
- D. B. Woodside as Marcus Henckman
- Hugh Jackman as Nicky Fontana
- Melanie Griffith as Bunny Baxter
- P. J. Byrne as Jonesy

== Episodes ==
No.	Title	Directed by	Written by	Original release date
1	"Pilot"	Gabriele Muccino	Bob Lowry	October 18, 2007
2	"What a Whale Wants"	John Showalter	Michael Gans & Richard Register	October 21, 2007
3	"Takin' Care of Business"	Matt Earl Beesley	Steven S. DeKnight	---
4	"Magic Carpet Ride"	n/a	n/a	---
5	"Bad Moon Rising"	n/a	n/a	---
6	"Need You Tonight"	n/a	n/a	---
7	"Fighter"	n/a	n/a	---
TBA	"Would I Lie to You"	n/a	n/a	---

== Critical reception ==
Critical reaction to the show was mostly negative. The musical numbers themselves were not criticized as much as the plot, the dialogue and the acting.

The opening line of The New York Times review said, "Viva Laughlin on CBS may well be the worst new show of the season, but is it the worst show in the history of television?"

Newsday's review started with, "The stud is a dud. And that's only the first of a dozen problems with CBS' admirably ambitious but jaw-droppingly wrongheaded new musical/murder mystery/family drama Viva Laughlin. Let us count the ways it bombs..."

== International broadcasters ==
The following broadcasters purchased the series:

Country	TV network(s)	Series premiere	Weekly schedule
Australia	Nine Network	22 October 2007	Cancelled after the first episode
Canada	E!	October 2007	Cancelled after the second episode; was seen Sundays at 7PM ET
United Kingdom	Virgin 1 Living	Virgin 1: 2007; Living: 2008	Virgin 1: Unknown; Living: Unknown
United States	CBS	October 18, 2007	Cancelled after the second episode

== See also ==
- Cop Rock, a poorly received 1990 ABC series which attempted to combine the genres of musical theater, black comedy, and police procedural
- Glee, a more successful television musical that debuted on FOX in 2009
- SMASH, another television musical that debuted on NBC in 2012
- Hull High, a 1990 NBC "musical soap opera"
- Fame (1982 TV series), ran for 5 seasons, inspiration for Glee
- Zoey's Extraordinary Playlist
- List of television series cancelled after one episode
