= Peter Bowker =

British playwright and screenwriter

- Born: 5 January 1959 (age 67); Hazel Grove, Stockport, England
- Occupations: Screenwriter, playwright
- Writing career
- Genre: Drama
- Notable works: Blackpool; Occupation; Capital; The A Word
- Notable awards: RTS Award for Best Writer; 2002 Flesh and Blood; 2009 Occupation; Awarded Doctorate of Letters at University of Keele 16 July 2015

Peter Bowker (born 5 January 1959) is a British playwright and screenwriter. He is best known for the television serials Blackpool (2004), a musical drama about a shady casino owner in the north of England; Occupation (2009), which follows three military servicemen adjusting to civilian life after a tour of duty in Iraq; Capital (2015), an Emmy award-winning drama about real-estate bubbles in South London; and The A Word (2016), an adaptation of Keren Margalit's Israeli drama Yellow Peppers about a family raising an autistic child. In 2007, he adapted Blackpool for CBS as Viva Laughlin.

== Biography ==
Born and raised in Hazel Grove, Stockport, England. Bowker was educated at Marple Hall School and read Philosophy and English at the University of Leeds. He taught for twelve years in a Leeds hospital unit for the intellectually disabled, and went on to study for an M.A. in creative writing at the University of East Anglia, where his tutors were novelists Malcolm Bradbury and Rose Tremain. He switched to the screenwriting course after realising he preferred writing dialogue.

Bowker began his career writing for the long-running BBC medical drama Casualty in 1992. He wrote seven episodes of the series, including the 1993 episode "Boiling Point", in which the emergency department is burnt down by rioters. "Boiling Point" attracted 17 million viewers and hundreds of complaints, and led to Bowker writing for Medics and Peak Practice.

Bowker later began to write his own works for television, and in 2002 contributed the play Flesh and Blood to the BBC Two season on sex and disability. It was hailed as a breakthrough in the representation of learning disability. He has also contributed updated versions of "The Miller's Tale" and A Midsummer Night's Dream for the BBC's The Canterbury Tales and Shakespeare ReTold series (2003 and 2005, respectively).

In 2009, Bowker rose back to prominence with a series of high profile and sometimes critically well-received serial dramas. Occupation, based upon the backdrop of the Iraq War and starring James Nesbitt and Stephen Graham, ran for three consecutive nights on BBC One. It averaged approximately 4 million viewers across the three nights and was described by The Independent as a "masterly production", as well as gaining praise across the wider media. Bowker followed this with another BBC drama, Desperate Romantics, which received mixed reviews, and an adaptation of Emily Brontë's classic novel Wuthering Heights for ITV.

Bowker executive produced both Viva Laughlin and Wuthering Heights. He won the Royal Television Society Award for Best Writer for both 2002, for Flesh and Blood, and 2009, for Occupation.

Bowker's projects have included an adaptation of Mark Haddon's novel, A Spot of Bother, a medical drama series called Monroe for ITV1, and the biographical BBC film Eric and Ernie about Morecambe and Wise, broadcast on 1 January 2011. In 2015, he wrote the three-part BBC series Capital based on John Lanchester's novel of the same name. In 2019, he wrote the Second World War drama World on Fire. It was renewed for a second series, which was broadcast in 2023.

== Filmography ==
| Production | Notes | Broadcaster |
|---|---|---|
| Casualty | Various episodes; 1992–97 | BBC One |
| Medics | Various episodes; 1993 | ITV |
| Out of the Blue | Co-writer (1995–96) | BBC One |
| Peak Practice | Various episodes; 1995 | ITV |
| The Uninvited | (1997) | ITV |
| Where the Heart Is | Various episodes; 1998 | ITV |
| Undercover Heart | (1998) | BBC One |
| A Christmas Carol | (2000) | ITV |
| Hidden Treasure | (2001) | |
| Flesh and Blood | (2002) | |
| The King and Us | (2002) | |
| The Canterbury Tales | "The Miller's Tale" (2003) | BBC One |
| Single | Various episodes; 2003 | |
| Blackpool | (2004) | BBC One |
| Shakespeare ReTold | "A Midsummer Night's Dream" (2005) | BBC One |
| Viva Blackpool | (2006) | BBC One |
| Viva Laughlin | Co-written with Bob Lowry (2007) | CBS |
| Occupation | (2009) | BBC One |
| Desperate Romantics | (2009) | BBC Two |
| Wuthering Heights | (2009) | ITV/PBS |
| Eric and Ernie | TV film (2011) | BBC Two |
| Monroe | (2011-12) | ITV |
| From There to Here | (2014) | BBC One |
| Marvellous | (2014) | BBC Two |
| Capital | (2015) | BBC One |
| The A Word | Creator, writer of all episodes (2016-2020) | BBC One |
| World On Fire | Creator, writer of all episodes (2019-) | BBC One |
| Ralph & Katie | Creator (2022) | BBC One |
