= Imogen Byron =

British actor

- Born: 8 March 1996 (age 30); London, England
- Occupation: Actress

Imogen Byron (born 8 March 1996) is an English actress. She had roles in Messiah, Pickles: The Dog Who Won the World Cup, Home Again, Stupid!, Last Chance Harvey, and Holby City.

== Filmography ==
=== Film ===
Year	Title	Role	Notes
2008	Last Chance Harvey	Niece at Wedding	

=== Television ===
Year	Title	Role	Notes
2004	Hardware	Courtney	Episode: "Bastard"
2004	Murphy's Law	Murphy's Daughter	Episode: "Jack's Back"
2004	Tunnel of Love	Gemma	Television film
2005	Messiah	Jaqueline Price	Episodes: "The Harrowing: Parts One, Two and Three"
2006	Pickles: The Dog Who Won the World Cup	Sammy Yeomans	Television film
2006	Home Again	Sheridan	6 episodes
2006	Stupid!	Various characters	Series 2; 7 episodes
2006	Green Wing	Bridesmaid	Christmas Special; uncredited role
2007	Forgiven	Older Jessica	Television film
2007	Cranford	Kate	Episodes: "June 1842" and "August 1842"
2008	That Mitchell and Webb Look	Girl with Hamster	Episode: #2.3
2009	The Omid Djalili Show	Various characters	Episode: #2.4
2010–2015	Holby City	Rachel Levy	17 episodes; recurring role
2015	Grantchester	Rose Parr	Episode: #2.1
2016	Going Forward	Kelly Wilde	Mini-series; 3 episodes; lead role
2016	People Just Do Nothing	Groupie	Episode: "Ipswich"
2016	Damilola, Our Loved Boy	Witness Bromley	Television film
2018	Millie Inbetween	Dee-Dee	Episodes: "Friend Fiction" and "Lauren Deleted"
2019	Doctors	Lola Cottram	Episode: "Independence Day"

=== Stage ===
Year	Title	Role	Venue
2004	Les Misérables	Young Éponine	Queen's Theatre
2005	The Wind in the Willows	Young Mouse	Open Air Theatre, Regent's Park
2007	Evita	Solo Child	Adelphi Theatre
2009	Inherit the Wind	Melinda Loomis	The Old Vic
2009	Feather Boy	Child	National Theatre Studio
2013	That Face	Alice	Landor Theatre
2013	Pride and Prejudice	Kitty Bennet	Open Air Theatre, Regent's Park
2015	Linda	Bridget	Royal Court Theatre
