= Damilola, Our Loved Boy =

- Genre: Drama; True crime
- Written by: Levi David Addai
- Directed by: Euros Lyn
- Starring: Babou Ceesay; Wunmi Mosaku
- Country of origin: United Kingdom
- Original language: English

Production
- Executive producer: Colin Barr
- Producer: Susan Horth
- Running time: 87 minutes
- Production company: Minnow Films

Original release
- Network: BBC One
- Release: 7 November 2016

Damilola, Our Loved Boy is a British television film about the events surrounding the 27 November 2000 death of Damilola Taylor. The film aired on BBC One on 7 November 2016, and was written by Levi David Addai, directed by Euros Lyn, and starred Babou Ceesay and Wunmi Mosaku. The film received three nominations at the 2017 British Academy Television Awards, winning Best Single Drama and Best Supporting Actress for Mosaku.

== Cast ==
- Babou Ceesay as Richard Taylor
- Wunmi Mosaku as Gloria Taylor
- Juwon Adedokun as Tunde Taylor
- Sammy Kamara as Damilola Taylor
- Juma Sharkah as Gbemi Taylor
- Robert Pugh as DCI Nick Ephgrave
- Raphel Famotibe as Dapo
- McKell David as Nathan
- Shola Adewusi as Auntie Dorcas
- Megan Parkinson as Leanne
- John Hollingworth as Detective Wallace
- Gamba Cole as Junior
- Eugene Wanangwa Khumbanyiwa as Pastor Peter
- Alfie Browne-Sykes as Will
- Muna Otaru as Tayo
- Naomi Ackie as Council Worker
- Doc Brown as Cab Driver
- Jud Charlton as Prosecution Barrister
- Richard Pepple as Defence Barrister
- Mario Demetriou as Male Witness
- Wanda Opalinska as Pathologist
- Imogen Byron as Witness Bromley
- Anthony Adjekum as Chris
- Ian Bonar as Damilola's Teacher
- Shanice Sewell as Passionate Youth

== Reception ==
=== Critical reception ===
The Telegraph's Michael Hogan gave the film four stars out of five, calling it a "terrific piece of TV" and a "fitting tribute". Hogan also praised the "superb" performances from Babou Ceesay and Wunmi Mosaku, and noted that Sammy Kamara as Damilola was "luminous and full of life".

The Guardian's Sam Wollaston called the film a "quietly powerful, affecting drama" and praised the performances from Mosaku, Juwon Adedokun and, in particular, Ceesay.

=== Accolades ===
List of awards and nominations
Year	Award	Category	Recipient(s)	Result	Ref(s)
2017	British Academy Television Awards	Best Single Drama	Damilola, Our Loved Boy	Won	
2017	British Academy Television Awards	Best Actor	Babou Ceesay	Nominated	
2017	British Academy Television Awards	Best Supporting Actress	Wunmi Mosaku	Won	
2017	Royal Television Society Craft & Design Awards	Director - Drama	Euros Lyn	Nominated	
2017	Royal Television Society Craft & Design Awards	Music - Original Score	Dru Masters	Won	
2018	Royal Television Society Programme Awards	Single Drama	Damilola, Our Loved Boy	Nominated	
2018	Royal Television Society Programme Awards	Actor: Female	Wunmi Mosaku	Nominated	
