= Thomas Morrison (actor) =

English actor

- Born: 30 June 1983 (age 42); Burnley, Lancashire, England, UK
- Occupation: Actor
- Years active: 2003–present

Thomas Morrison (born 30 June 1983) is an English actor who has performed in theatre, TV and film. He is best known for his appearances in On the Shore of the Wide World and as Scripps in Cast B and C of Alan Bennett's The History Boys. working alongside Steven Webb and Matt Smith.

== Life and career ==
Morrison was born in Burnley, Lancashire and attended the Guildhall School of Music and Drama, London for three years. After graduation Thomas landed the part of Danny Holden in the BBC Television drama Blackpool, In 2011 - 2012 Thomas Morrison appeared in the ITV television drama Monroe as Lee Bradley the bed porter. He also had a role in the BBC drama The 7.39 and had a part in the 2015 BBC drama Jonathan Strange & Mr Norrell in the role of Winespill in Series 1, Episode 3.

Morrison gained his first television role in BBC One's Blackpool before stepping into theatre. His first appearances include Kes and On the Shore of the Wide World at the Royal Exchange, Manchester before then moving with the latter to the National Theatre and then featuring as Scripps in Alan Bennett's The History Boys in Casts B and C. In all three of his first theatre productions he appeared alongside co-star Steven Webb.

His later ventures included appearances in a small role in Sky One's adaptation of Terry Pratchett's The Colour of Magic in the same scene as Pratchett himself. He also played Hooper in the 2008 film adaptation of Evelyn Waugh's Brideshead Revisited.

== Awards and recognition ==
- 2006 Laurence Olivier Award for Best New Play: Cast member of On the Shore of the Wide World
- 2004 Royal Television Society Network Newcomer – On Screen, nominee

== Credits ==
=== Theatre ===
Title	Role	Theatre	Performance Dates
The Dybbuk	2nd Batlon / 1st Student	King's Head Theatre, London	January 2008 – February 2008
Alaska	Chris	Royal Court Theatre Upstairs, London	May 2007 – June 2007
The History Boys	Scripps	Wyndham's Theatre, London (West End)	December 2006 – April 2007
"	"	UK Tour	August 2006 – November 2006
"	"	National Theatre, London	September 2005 – January 2006
On the Shore of the Wide World	Alex Holmes	National Theatre, London	May 2005 – August 2005
"	"	Royal Exchange, Manchester	April 2005 – May 2005
Kes	Tibbut	Royal Exchange, Manchester	September 2004 –October 2004

=== Television ===
Programme Title (Episodes)	Role	Channel/Broadcaster	Original Air Date
The 7.39	Martin Dawson	BBC One	January 2014
Monroe	Lee Bradley	ITV	March 2011 - November 2012
Any Human Heart	Young Vicar	Channel 4	November - December 2010
The Colour of Magic	Dim Student	Sky One	March 2008
Doctors (Ep 151 : Series 9)	Duncan Brookfield	BBC One	December 2007
The Bill (Ep 55 : Series 22)	Peter Hanley	ITV1	August 2006
Holby City (Ep 23 : Series 7)	Bradley Johnson	BBC One	March 2005
Blackpool	Danny Holden	BBC One	November 2004 – December 2004

=== Film ===
Film title	Role	Release date
Brideshead Revisited	Hooper	2008
