= 2017 British Academy Television Awards =

UK television awards ceremony

63rd British Academy Television Awards
- Date: 14 May 2017
- Site: Royal Festival Hall
- Hosted by: Sue Perkins

Highlights
- Best Comedy Series: Charlie Brooker's 2016 Wipe
- Best Drama: Happy Valley
- Best Actor: Adeel Akhtar; Murdered by My Father
- Best Actress: Sarah Lancashire; Happy Valley
- Best Comedy Performance: Steve Coogan Alan Partridge's Scissored Isle; Phoebe Waller-Bridge Fleabag
- Most awards: Damilola, Our Loved Boy / Happy Valley (2)
- Most nominations: The Crown (5)

Television coverage
- Channel: BBC One
- Duration: 2 hours

The 2017 British Academy Television Awards were held on 14 May 2017 at the Royal Festival Hall in London. They were hosted by Sue Perkins.

The nominations were announced on 11 April, with The Crown nominated for five awards. The BAFTA Fellowship was awarded to Joanna Lumley.

The 2017 British Academy Television Craft Awards were held on 23 April 2017.

== Winners and nominees ==
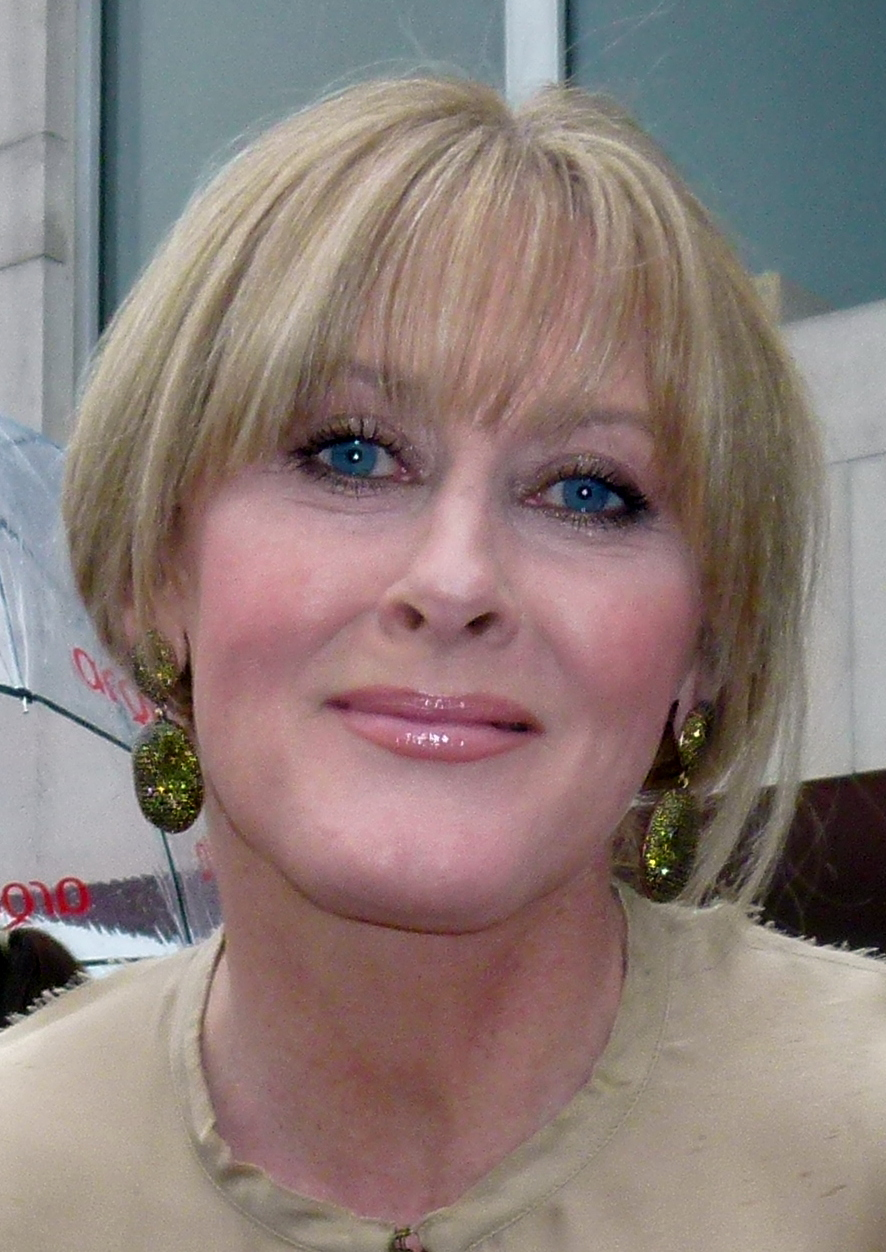
Sarah Lancashire, Best Actress winner

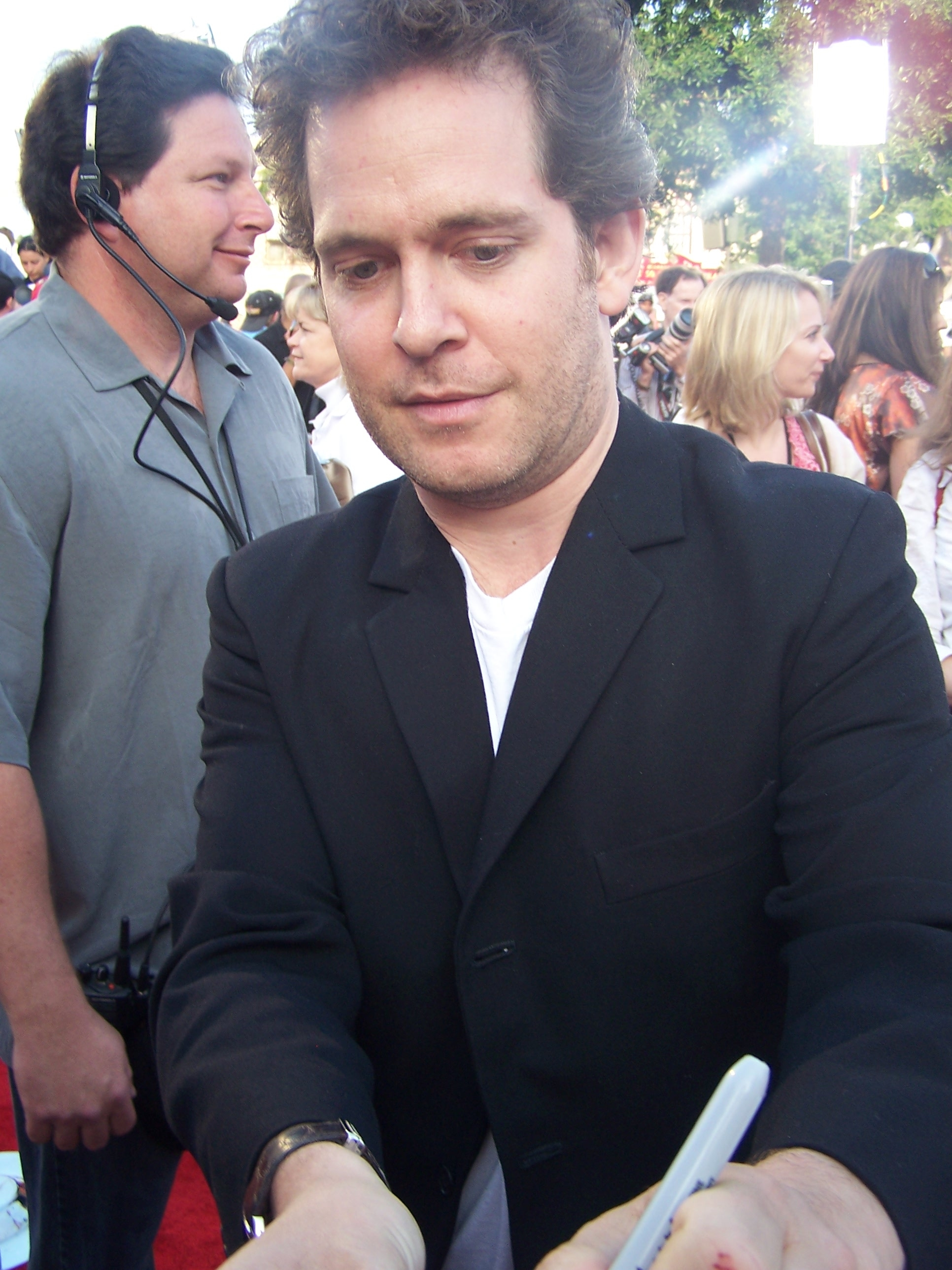
Tom Hollander, Best Supporting Actor winner

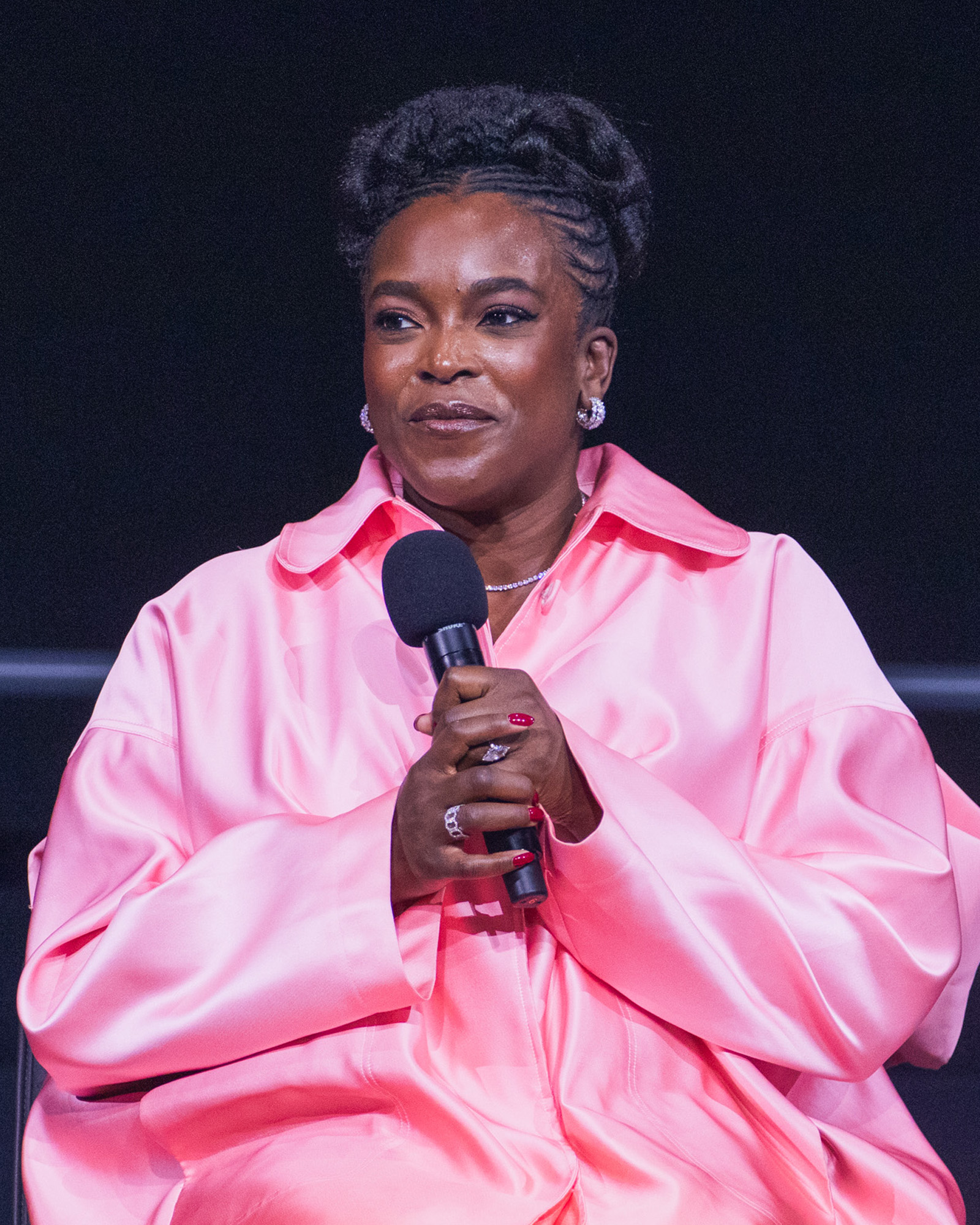
Wunmi Mosaku, Best Supporting Actress winner

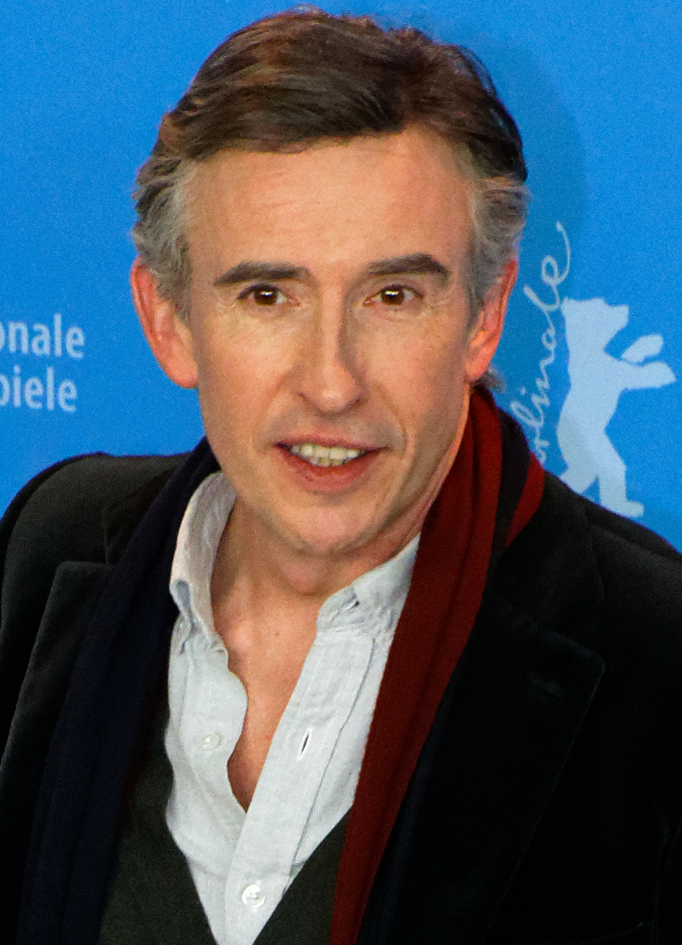
Steve Coogan, Best Male Comedy Performance winner

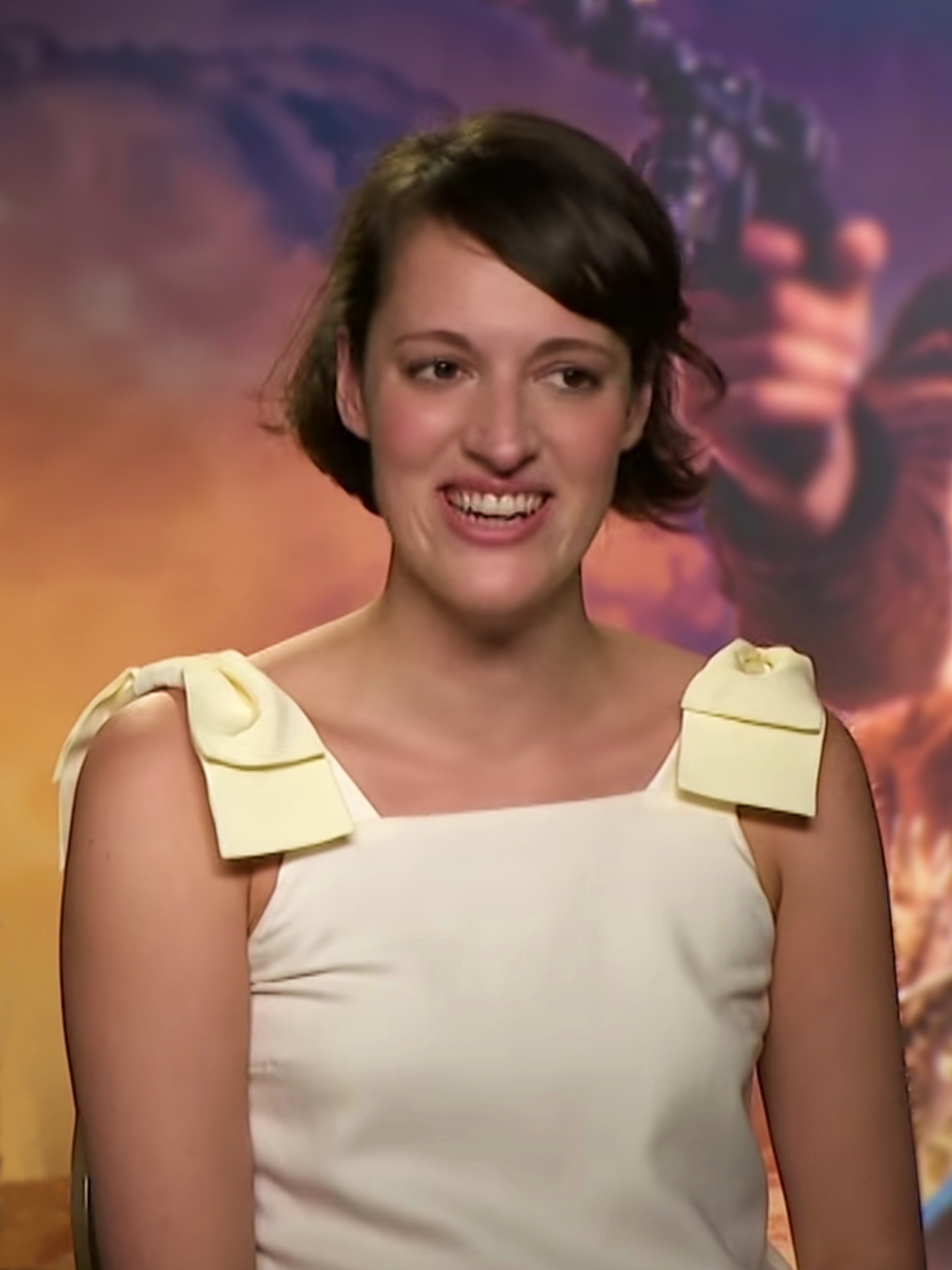
Phoebe Waller-Bridge, Best Female Comedy Performance winner

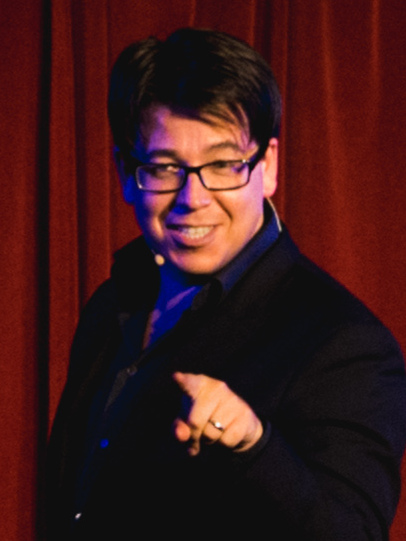
Michael McIntyre, Best Entertainment Performance winner

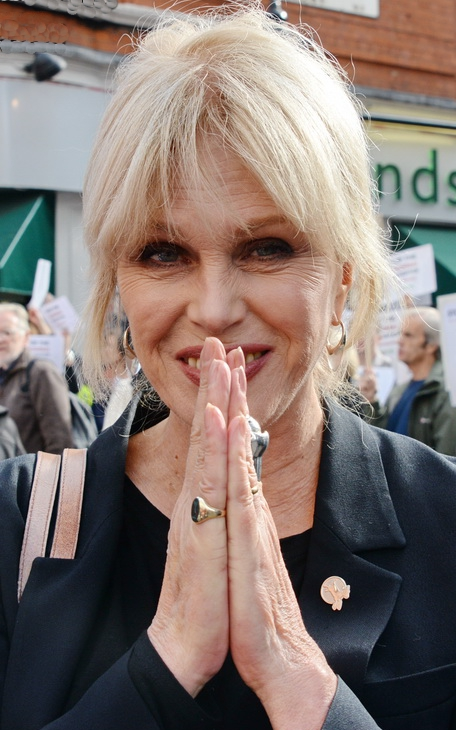
Joanna Lumley, BAFTA Fellowship Award winner

Best Actor	Best Actress
Adeel Akhtar – Murdered by My Father as Shahzad (BBC Three); Babou Ceesay – Damilola, Our Loved Boy as Richard Taylor (BBC One); Robbie Coltrane – National Treasure as Paul Finchley (Channel 4); Benedict Cumberbatch – The Hollow Crown: The Wars of the Roses as King Richard III (BBC Two)	Sarah Lancashire – Happy Valley as Sgt. Catherine Cawood (BBC One); Nikki Amuka-Bird – NW as Natalie Blake (BBC One); Jodie Comer – Thirteen as Ivy Moxam (BBC Three); Claire Foy – The Crown as Queen Elizabeth II (Netflix)
Best Supporting Actor	Best Supporting Actress
Tom Hollander – The Night Manager as Major "Corky" Lance Corkoran (BBC One); Jared Harris – The Crown as King George VI (Netflix); John Lithgow – The Crown as Winston Churchill (Netflix); Daniel Mays – Line of Duty as Sergeant Danny Waldron (BBC Two)	Wunmi Mosaku – Damilola, Our Loved Boy as Gloria Taylor (BBC One); Siobhan Finneran – Happy Valley as Clare Cartwright (BBC One); Vanessa Kirby – The Crown as Princess Margaret (Netflix); Nicola Walker – Last Tango in Halifax as Gillian (BBC One)
Best Male Comedy Performance	Best Female Comedy Performance
Steve Coogan – Alan Partridge's Scissored Isle as Alan Partridge (Sky Atlantic); Asim Chaudhry – People Just Do Nothing as Chabuddy G/Charlie (BBC Three); Harry Enfield – The Windsors as Charles (Channel 4); David Mitchell – Upstart Crow as Will Shakespeare (BBC Two)	Phoebe Waller-Bridge – Fleabag as Fleabag (BBC Three); Olivia Colman – Fleabag as Godmother (BBC Three); Lesley Manville – Mum as Cathy Bradshaw (BBC Two); Diane Morgan – Cunk on Shakespeare as Philomena Cunk (BBC Two)
Best Entertainment Performance	Best Single Drama
Michael McIntyre – Michael McIntyre's Big Show (BBC One); Adam Hills – The Last Leg (Channel 4); Graham Norton – The Graham Norton Show (BBC One); Claudia Winkleman – Strictly Come Dancing (BBC One)	Damilola, Our Loved Boy (BBC One); Aberfan: The Green Hollow (BBC One); Murdered by My Father (BBC Three); NW (BBC Two)
Best Mini-Series	Best Drama Series
National Treasure (Channel 4); The Hollow Crown: The Wars of the Roses (BBC Two); The Secret (ITV); The Witness for the Prosecution (BBC One)	Happy Valley (BBC One); The Crown (Netflix); The Durrells (ITV); War and Peace (BBC One)
Best Soap and Continuing Drama	Best International Programme
Emmerdale (ITV); Casualty (BBC One); EastEnders (BBC One); Hollyoaks (Channel 4)	American Crime Story: The People v. O. J. Simpson (FX) / (BBC Two); The Night Of (HBO) / (Sky Atlantic); Stranger Things (Netflix); Transparent (Amazon Prime)
Best Factual Series or Strand	Huw Wheldon Award for Specialist Factual
Exodus: Our Journey to Europe (BBC Two); 24 Hours in Police Custody (Channel 4); The Prosecutors: Real Crime and Punishment (BBC 4); Kids on the Edge (Channel 4)	Planet Earth II (BBC One); Alan Bennett's Diaries (BBC Two); Attenborough's Life That Glows (BBC Two); Grayson Perry's All Man (Channel 4)
Flaherty Award for Single Documentary	Best Feature
Hillsborough (BBC Two); Behind Closed Doors (BBC One); How to Die: Simon's Choice (BBC Two); HyperNormalisation (BBC iPlayer)	Who Do You Think You Are? (BBC One); The Doctor Who Gave up Drugs (BBC Two); The Great British Bake Off (BBC One); Travel Man (Channel 4)
Best Reality and Constructed Factual	Best Current Affairs
Muslims Like Us (BBC Two); First Dates (Channel 4); The Real Marigold Hotel (BBC Two); The Secret Life of 5 Year Olds (Channel 4)	Teenage Prison Abuse Exposed – Panorama (BBC One); Inside Obama's White House (BBC Two); Three Days of Terror: The Charlie Hebdo Attacks – This World (BBC Two); Unarmed Black Male – This World (BBC Two)
Best News Coverage	Best Sport
Victoria Derbyshire: Footballer's Abuse (BBC Two); BBC North West Tonight: Hillsborough Inquests (BBC One); Channel 4 News: Brexit Day One (Channel 4); Sky News Tonight – Aleppo: Death of a City (Sky News)	2016 Open (Sky Sports 1); 2016 Rio Olympics (BBC One); 2016 Rio Paralympics (Channel 4); Six Nations – England V Wales (ITV)
Best Live Event	Best Entertainment Programme
The Queen's 90th Birthday Celebration (ITV); The Centenary of the Battle of the Somme: Thiepval (BBC One); Shakespeare Live! From the RSC (BBC Two); Stand up to Cancer (Channel 4)	Ant and Dec's Saturday Night Takeaway (ITV); Britain's Got Talent (ITV); Michael McIntyre's Big Show (BBC One); Strictly Come Dancing (BBC One)
Best Scripted Comedy	Best Comedy and Comedy Entertainment Programme
People Just Do Nothing (BBC Three); Camping (Sky Atlantic); Fleabag (BBC Three); Flowers (Channel 4)	Charlie Brooker's 2016 Wipe (BBC Two); Cunk on Shakespeare (BBC Two); The Last Leg: Live from Rio (Channel 4); Taskmaster (Dave)
Virgin's Must-See Moments
Planet Earth II – "Snakes v iguanas chase"; Game of Thrones – "Battle of the Bastards"; The Late Late Show with James Corden – "Carpool Karaoke with Michelle Obama"; Line of Duty – "Urgent exit required"; Strictly Come Dancing – "Ed Balls’ Gangnam Style"; Who Do You Think You Are – "Danny Dyer's origins"

== Programmes with multiple nominations ==
Programmes that received multiple nominations
Nominations	Programme
5	The Crown
3	Damilola, Our Loved Boy
3	Fleabag
3	Happy Valley
3	Strictly Come Dancing
2	Cunk on Shakespeare
2	Line of Duty
2	Michael McIntyre's Big Show
2	Murdered by My Father
2	National Treasure
2	NW
2	People Just Do Nothing
2	Planet Earth II
2	The Hollow Crown: The Wars of the Roses
2	The Last Leg
2	Who Do You Think You Are?

Networks that received multiple nominations
Nominations	Network
30	BBC One
24	BBC Two
17	Channel 4
8	BBC Three
7	ITV
6	Netflix
4	Sky Atlantic
2	HBO

== In Memoriam ==
- Andrew Sachs
- Mary Tyler Moore
- Gareth Gwenlan
- Jean Alexander
- Darcus Howe
- Brian Rix
- Peter Vaughan
- Antony Jay
- Carla Lane
- Gorden Kaye
- Robert Vaughn
- Jimmy Perry
- Peter Morley
- Tim Pigott-Smith
- Steve Hewlett
- Ian McCaskill
- Michael Nicholson
- Barry Hanson
- Colin Dexter
- Michael Wearing
- Christopher Morahan
- Christopher Bland
- Philip Saville
- Alan Simpson
- Liz Smith
- Caroline Aherne
