= Miranda Carter =

British writer (born 1965)

Miranda Carter FRSL
- Born: 1965 (age 60–61)
- Education: St Paul's Girls' School; Exeter College, Oxford University
- Occupations: historian, writer and biographer
- Spouse: John Lanchester
- Children: 2
- Writing career
- Pen name: M. J. Carter
- Language: English
- Website: www.mj-carter.com

Miranda Carter (born 1965) is an English historian, writer and biographer, who also publishes fiction under the name M. J. Carter.

== Education ==
Carter was educated at St Paul's Girls School and Exeter College, Oxford.

== Career ==
Carter's first book was a biography of the art historian and spy Anthony Blunt, entitled Anthony Blunt: His Lives. It won the Royal Society of Literature Award and the Orwell Prize and was short-listed for the CWA Gold Dagger for Non-Fiction, the Guardian First Book Award, the Whitbread Prize for Best Biography, and the James Tait Black Memorial Prize. In the US, it was chosen by the New York Times Book Review as one of seven best books selected by The Times' editors for 2002. Noted the editors, "It's an unusual achievement: Miranda Carter's biography of Anthony Blunt is more interesting than the man."

Her second historical undertaking was The Three Emperors, which was a group biography of Kaiser Wilhelm II, Tsar Nicholas II and King George V, all world leaders during the First World War.

Carter also has written several novels, notably The Strangler Vine and its sequel The Infidel Stain, which was later republished as The Printer's Coffin. Her third mystery is entitled The Devil's Feast. All three are Victorian detective and mystery stories.

She was elected a Fellow of the Royal Society of Literature in 2011.

== Personal life ==
Carter is married to John Lanchester, with whom she has two children, and lives in London.

== Accolades ==
- 2010: Los Angeles Times Book Prize (Biography), The Three Emperors: Three Cousins, Three Empires and the Road to World War One, shortlist
- 2002: Whitbread Biography Award, Anthony Blunt: His Lives, shortlist
- 2002: The Royal Society of Literature Award, Anthony Blunt: His Lives
- 2002: Orwell Prize, Anthony Blunt: His Lives
- 2002: James Tait Black Memorial Prize (for biography), Anthony Blunt: His Lives, shortlist
- 2002: Duff Cooper Prize, Anthony Blunt: His Lives, shortlist
- 2002: Crime Writers' Association Silver Dagger for Non-Fiction, Anthony Blunt: His Lives, shortlist
- 2001: Guardian First Book Award, Anthony Blunt: His Lives, shortlist

== Bibliography ==
=== Non-fiction ===
- Anthony Blunt: His Lives. London: Macmillan. 2001. ISBN 0-330-36766-8
- The Three Emperors: Three Cousins, Three Empires and the Road to World War One. London: Penguin. 2009. ISBN 978-0-67091556-9

=== Avery & Blake Series ===
- The Strangler Vine. London: Fig Tree. 2014. ISBN 978-0-241-14622-4
- The Infidel Stain [or] The Printer's Coffin. London: Fig Tree. 2015. ISBN 978-0-241-14625-5
- The Devil's Feast. London: Fig Tree. 2016. ISBN 978-0-241-14636-1
