= Blackpool (TV series) =

- Also known as: Viva Blackpool
- Genre: Musical; Drama; Crime
- Created by: Peter Bowker
- Written by: Peter Bowker
- Directed by: Coky Giedroyc; Julie Anne Robinson; Catherine Morshead
- Starring: David Morrissey; Sarah Parish; David Tennant; Georgia Taylor; Thomas Morrison; Steve Pemberton; David Bradley; Bryan Dick; Kevin Doyle; John Thomson
- Composer: Rob Lane
- Country of origin: United Kingdom
- Original language: English
- No. of series: 1
- No. of episodes: 7

Production
- Executive producers: David Bernath; Sally Haynes; Laura Mackie
- Producer: Kate Lewis
- Cinematography: Lukas Strebel
- Editors: Anthony Combes; David Rees
- Running time: 60 minutes; 90 minutes (Viva Blackpool!)
- Production companies: BBC; BBC America

Original release
- Network: BBC One
- Release: 11 November 2004 – 10 June 2006

Blackpool is a British television musical drama serial, produced in-house by the BBC, that first broadcast on BBC One on 11 November 2004. Starring David Morrissey, Sarah Parish, and David Tennant, the serial was written by Peter Bowker, who had previously written for BBC One's modern adaptation of The Canterbury Tales and BBC Two's Flesh and Blood, and directed by Coky Giedroyc and Julie Anne Robinson. The series was filmed on location in Brentford and Blackpool itself, and broadcast across six weeks at 9:00 pm on Thursdays, until 16 December 2004.

The plot concerns the murder of a young man in a Blackpool arcade, and how it affects the people involved in the arcade and the investigation. As the investigation proceeds, it takes its toll on the characters; Ripley (Morrissey), under suspicion of murder, finds his public and private life slowly unravelling as both his bullying nature and long-forgotten demons from his past return to haunt him, whilst Carlisle (Tennant), intent on proving Ripley is the murderer and planning to use Natalie (Parish) to get to him, finds himself genuinely falling in love with her instead.

The series also starred Kevin Doyle, John Thomson, Georgia Taylor and Steve Pemberton in supporting roles. For its broadcast on BBC America in 2005, the series was renamed Viva Blackpool. Subsequently, as a result of its broadcast in the United States, the series went on to win a Peabody Award for BBC Worldwide, the commercial overseas distribution subsidiary of the BBC. In 2006, a feature-length sequel to the original, also known as Viva Blackpool, broadcast on BBC One.

== Music ==
The series employed pop music in the course of the narrative. The original recordings are played, and are sung along with and accompanied by slightly surreal dance routines acted out by the characters, in a manner reminiscent of the work of Dennis Potter.

A soundtrack was also released to accompany the series, in which a six-page booklet explained why each song used was included in the series.

== Reception ==
Critical reception to the series was positive. Viewing figures averaged between four and five million per episode. In 2005, the series was nominated in the Best Drama Serial category at the British Academy Television Awards, eventually losing out to Channel 4's Sex Traffic. It did, however, win the "Best Miniseries" and Grand Prize accolades at Canada's Banff Television Festival.

In December 2005, it was announced that it had been nominated, under its American title, Viva Blackpool, in the Golden Globe Award for Best Miniseries or Television Film category at the 2006 Golden Globe Awards.

== Distribution ==
The series was sold to several countries, broadcasting on Television New Zealand's TV One, BBC America in the United States, BBC Canada and TVOntario in Canada, ABC in Australia, Canvas in Belgium, YLE in Finland and VPRO in the Netherlands. The series was also on DVD in the UK, Australia and the Netherlands.

In October 2007, American network CBS aired a series based on the same premise called Viva Laughlin, adapted by Bob Lowry and the creator of Blackpool, Peter Bowker, coproduced by BBC Worldwide, CBS Paramount Network Television, Sony Pictures Television, and Seed Productions; however, the series was cancelled after two episodes due to low ratings.

== Cast ==
- David Morrissey as Ripley Holden, an ambitious, arrogant arcade owner who believes strongly in luck, and who is planning to turn his arcade into a Las Vegas-style casino hotel and thus revive Blackpool's fortunes.
- Georgia Taylor as Shyanne Holden, Ripley and Natalie's spoiled daughter, who worships her doting father but is cruel and distant to her mother.

=== Blackpool ===
- Sarah Parish as Natalie Holden, Ripley's shy, frustrated and lonely wife, whom Ripley takes for granted and to whom Carlisle takes a shine.
- David Tennant as D.I. Peter Carlisle, the detective assigned to investigate the murder. A charming, good-natured and gluttonous, although extremely manipulative, police officer, who dislikes Ripley almost on sight.
- Thomas Morrison as Danny Holden, Ripley and Natalie's troubled and awkward son, who is constantly belittled by his father.
- Steve Pemberton as Adrian Marr, Ripley's accountant.
- David Bradley as Hallworth, a devout Christian who opposes and campaigns against Ripley's plans to establish a casino hotel.
- Bryan Dick as D.C. Blythe, Carlisle's junior partner.
- Kevin Doyle as Steve, Shyanne's older boyfriend, who has a bad relationship with Ripley after an incident in their school days.
- John Thomson as Terry Corlette.
- David Hounslow as D.C.I. Jim Allbright, Carlisle's senior officer and mate of Ripley's.

=== Viva Blackpool ===
- Annette Crosbie as Mrs. Berry, mother of Ripley's now-deceased business partner, Patrick.
- Mark Williams as Tommy "The Motor" Vesty, owner of a local car showroom.
- Megan Dodds as Kitty De-Luxe, a showgirl and convicted fraudster whom Ripley falls in love with.
- Al Weaver as Darrell aka 'Vibe', a runner working for Pollard who falls in love with Shyanne.
- Keith Allen as Steve Pollard, a local entrepreneur and sporting agent.
- Paul Ritter as Billy Pope, Ripley's right-hand-man in the Chapel of Love.
- Hayley Carmichael as D.S. Coogan, the officer investigating the theft.

== Episodes ==
=== Blackpool (2004) ===
No.	Title	Directed by	Written by	Original release date	Prod. code	UK viewers (millions)
1	"Episode 1"	Julie Ann Robinson	Peter Bowker	11 November 2004	TBA	5.31
Musical numbers: "Viva Las Vegas" by Elvis Presley; "You Can Get It If You Really Want" by Jimmy Cliff; "She's Not You" by Elvis Presley; "These Boots Are Made for Walkin'" by Nancy Sinatra
2	"Episode 2"	Julie Ann Robinson	Peter Bowker	18 November 2004	TBA	4.59
Musical numbers: "The Gambler" by Kenny Rogers; "Cupid" by Johnny Nash; "Should I Stay" by Gabrielle; "I Second That Emotion" by Smokey Robinson and the Miracles
3	"Episode 3"	Julie Ann Robinson	Peter Bowker	25 November 2004	TBA	N/A
Musical numbers: "Brilliant Mistake" by Elvis Costello; "Skweeze Me, Pleeze Me" by Slade; "The Boy with the Thorn in His Side" by The Smiths; "The Secrets That You Keep" by Mud
4	"Episode 4"	Coky Giedroyc	Peter Bowker	2 December 2004	TBA	N/A
Musical numbers: "Walk Tall" by Val Doonican; "I'm Gonna Make You Love Me" by Diana Ross & The Supremes and The Temptations; "Ooh La La" by The Faces
5	"Episode 5"	Coky Giedroyc	Peter Bowker	9 December 2004	TBA	N/A
Musical numbers: "Should I Stay or Should I Go" by The Clash; "Invisible" by Alison Moyet; "Don't Stop Me Now" by Queen; "Knock Knock, Who's There?" by Mary Hopkin
6	"Episode 6"	Coky Giedroyc	Peter Bowker	16 December 2004	TBA	N/A
Musical numbers: "White Wedding" by Billy Idol; "There Goes My Everything" by Engelbert Humperdinck; "Don't Leave Me This Way" by The Communards; "(There's) Always Something There to Remind Me" by Sandie Shaw

=== Viva Blackpool (2006) ===
No.	Title	Directed by	Written by	Original release date	Prod. code	UK viewers (millions)
1	"Viva Blackpool"	Catherine Morshead	Peter Bowker	10 June 2006	TBA	N/A
Having returned from Vegas following the death of his business partner Patrick, Ripley finds himself living in a trailer and running the local 'Chapel of Love', which he hopes to franchise out into a country-wide business. When the beautiful Kitty De-Luxe rocks up at the altar, having been ditched by her groom, Ripley finds himself falling in love for all the wrong reasons. Coupled with his new found romance, Ripley finds himself caught up in a bidding war between a local sports agent and a car dealer, both desperate to get their hands on one of Patrick's prize possessions - the real Jules Rimet trophy, which seemingly disappeared after the 1962 World Cup. Only Ripley can obtain the object of their desires, but little does he know that his conscience is going to be harder to beat than he first thought. Musical numbers: "Crazy Little Thing Called Love" by Queen; "I'm on My Way" by The Proclaimers; "I Only Want To Be With You" by Dusty Springfield; "Ring of Fire" by Johnny Cash; "It's Not Unusual" by Tom Jones; "Dream A Little Dream" by Cass Elliot
