= The Wall (Lanchester novel) =

2019 climate fiction novel by John Lanchester

- Author: John Lanchester
- Genre: Climate fiction
- Publisher: W. W. Norton & Company
- Publication date: March 5, 2019
- Publication place: United Kingdom
- Pages: 288
- ISBN: 978-1-324-00163-8

The Wall is a 2019 climate fiction novel by British journalist and novelist John Lanchester. It is Lanchester's fifth novel.

The novel is set in the future, where the United Kingdom has erected a massive wall around itself to defend against rising sea levels and keep out climate refugees, called Others.

The novel received positive reviews from critics, including a starred review from Kirkus Reviews. Alec Nevala-Lee, writing for The New York Times, noted that the book "arrives at a moment in which the definition of a wall is a matter of national debate, and it actively invites such associations". Amy Brady of the Chicago Review of Books called it "a harrowing but beautifully written novel that speaks not only to the uncertainties of life in the Anthropocene but also to recent discourses surrounding racial and economic divisions, nationalism, and immigration." Johanna Thomas-Corr of The Guardian called it "an environmental fable that manages to be both disquieting and quite good fun at the same time." Dan Hartland, in a review for Strange Horizons, noted thematic similarities with George R. R. Martin's A Song of Ice and Fire.

The book was longlisted for the 2019 Booker Prize.
