= Fragrant Harbour =

2002 novel by John Lanchester

- First edition (publ. Faber & Faber)

Fragrant Harbour (2002) is the third novel by author John Lanchester, who grew up in Hong Kong. It was shortlisted for the James Tait Black Memorial Prize (2002).

== Plot summary ==
Set in Hong Kong, the story is told through the eyes of several people. Dawn Stone is an ambitious young woman who wants to make as much money as quickly as she can. Tom Stewart is an Englishman who had been in Hong Kong since 1935 and made his fortune in business. Sister Maria, whom Tom wants to love, is a devout nun and tends to the territory's poor and needy. Their stories all converge in the end when Hong Kong is passed from British to Chinese rule.

== Critical reception ==
A review in New Statesman praised Lanchester's "clear-as-springwater style, and the characterisation".
