= Capital (British TV series) =

2015 British television series

- Based on: Capital by John Lanchester
- Written by: Peter Bowker
- Directed by: Euros Lyn
- Starring: Toby Jones; Gemma Jones; Adeel Akhtar; Rachael Stirling; Wunmi Mosaku; Robert Emms; Zrinka Cvitešić; Lesley Sharp
- Theme music composer: Dru Masters
- Country of origin: United Kingdom
- Original language: English
- No. of series: 1
- No. of episodes: 3 on BBC One, 4 on Netflix

Production
- Executive producers: Peter Bowker; Lucy Richer; Derek Wax
- Producer: Matt Strevens
- Cinematography: Zac Nicholson
- Editor: Emma Hulme
- Running time: 60 minutes on BBC One, 45 minutes on Netflix
- Production company: Kudos

Original release
- Network: BBC One (HD)
- Release: 24 November – 8 December 2015

Capital is a British television adaptation of John Lanchester's novel Capital. It was originally broadcast as three one hour episodes and was later recut to four 45 minute episodes by Netflix. The series was written by Peter Bowker, directed by Euros Lyn and produced by Matt Strevens for Kudos Film & Television Company. The story centres on the residents of a road in South London as the value of each house in the street is approaching £3 million. They all begin to receive repeated postcards with the message "We want what you have". The first episode was broadcast on BBC One on 24 November 2015.

== Plot ==
The central characters all have a connection to Pepys Road, a fictional street (although there are two actual Pepys Roads in South London — namely in Raynes Park and New Cross) in an unidentified south London suburb. The houses in the street were once ordinary family homes in an unremarkable residential district, but thanks to London’s ever-increasing property values they are now properties worth millions. Their residents include those such as wealthy banker Roger Yount (played by Toby Jones) who have recently bought their homes, as well as people who have lived in the street since before its houses became so valuable, such as elderly widow Petunia Howe (played by Gemma Jones) who moved there as a young bride. They all start to receive postcards saying "We want what you have", which some residents interpret as a threat, but which others initially ignore.

== Production ==
Describing how he became involved with the production, writer Peter Bowker said, "I was already reading Capital when Derek Wax (Executive Producer), who I've worked with before, sent me it. It hadn't occurred to me that it could be adapted because so much of it is people's internal dialogue and thoughts, so I thought the challenge of that would be intriguing. I've admired John Lanchester's writing as an economist so to begin with I was just excited to meet him! Then the more I read the book the more I thought it was similar to Dickens, both in terms of catching a moment of time and how the big decisions filter in to everyday life. If you start with the people at the bottom, who absorb the impact of those decisions, there's something dramatic there. So that's how it started."

== Cast ==
Main Cast

- Adeel Akhtar – Ahmed Kamal, corner-shop-keeper
- Danny Ashok – Shahid Kamal, Ahmed's brother
- Alexander Arnold – Parker, Smitty's assistant
- Shabana Azmi – Mrs. Kamal, mother of Ahmed, Shahid and Usman
- Zrinka Cvitešić – Matya, the Younts' family nanny from Hungary
- Bryan Dick – DI Mill, detective investigating the We Want What You Have campaign
- Robert Emms – Graham "Smitty" Leatherby, artist and grandson of Petunia
- Emma Fielding – Strauss, the Kamal family's lawyer
- Mona Goodwin – Rohinka, wife of Ahmed
- Andrew Gower – Mark, a banker and colleague of Roger's
- Kobna Holdbrook-Smith – Mashinko, churchgoer and love interest to Quentina
- Hamza Jeetooa – Usman Kamal, Ahmed's brother
- Gemma Jones – Petunia Howe, an elderly widow who has lived in Pepys Road since she married as a young woman
- Rad Kaim – Zbigniew aka Bogdan, a Polish builder
- Matthew Marsh – Lothar, Roger's superior at PinkerLloyd
- Wunmi Mosaku – Quentina, Zimbabwean refugee working illegally as a traffic warden
- Lesley Sharp – Mary Leatherby, Petunia's daughter
- Rachael Stirling – Arabella Yount, Roger's wife
- Toby Jones – Roger Yount, banker

Recurring Cast

- Kaiya Bakrania – Fatima, Ahmed and Rohinka's daughter
- Arthur Bateman – Conrad, Roger and Arabella's eldest son
- Noma Dumezweni – Greaves, an immigration official on Quentina's case
- Krystian Godlewski – Piotr, Bogdan's colleague and roommate
- Tom Reed – Iqbal, an old friend of Shahid's

== Critical reception ==
Reviewing the first episode in UK newspaper The Guardian, Sam Wollaston began by asking "How much of a city of 8.5 million can you get into one south London street? Capital (BBC1), adapted from John Lanchester's novel, manages a lot". He added that "[…] Lanchester – and in turn Peter Bowker and Euros Lyn, who have adapted and directed so excellently – have managed to squeeze an incredible amount into one street, one book, and then further squeeze into three hours of television. A lot of the important stuff, as well as what is most wonderful and most terrible about the place". Wollaston found the episode's evocation of life in a London street to be "instantly recognizable" and concluded, "It's not just a brilliant allegorical portrait of London. There are stories to tell, the postcards keep coming […] We're heading for a crash, big bang, meltdown".

In The Daily Telegraph, Ben Lawrence gave the opening episode four out of five stars. He began his review by noting that he had found the novel on which it is based "[…] a disappointment. This was no Dickensian bird’s-eye view, but an overly schematic tangle of under-developed plotlines populated by underwritten characters". By contrast, he thought the television adaptation showed "an eternal London, riven by inequality and quickened by diversity". He was particularly impressed by the cast, writing "[…] it’s the acting that makes this production sing. There was not a bad performance among the large ensemble cast and each brought something very different". He praised Toby Jones' "fine line in quiet desperation" as banker Roger Yount, and Rachael Stirling’s portrayal of his wife Arabella, but judged that "The standout performances came from Gemma Jones, as pensioner Petunia Howe, a working-class Londoner who had become an accidental millionaire by sitting steadily in her Edwardian terraced house and Wunmi Mosaku as Quentina Mkfesi, a Zimbabwean asylum seeker working illegally as a traffic warden and facing deportation. Both actresses ably captured the loneliness of London life".

Writing in The Independent, Daisy Wyatt decided that, "Fans of John Lanchester's best-selling novel Capital will be pleased with the BBC adaptation starring Toby Jones and Lesley Sharp. Not only does the three-part drama revisit such brilliantly painted characters, it does so with admirable faithfulness". However, she felt that "[…] for viewers unfamiliar with the book, it may not have quite enough intrigue to keep them coming back for more", but concluded overall, "That said, the drama is a pleasing adaptation that brings life to lovable characters, with strong performances from the ensemble cast".

Ben Dowell, writing in Radio Times described Capital as a "sparkling and hugely relevant new drama". He found that, "This is for the most part a very believable London (except for the summery trees bedecked with leaves during a scene purporting to be Christmas). It shows Londoners trying to work out very real problems. It’s a world where people who think they lead very separate lives are shown to be very connected – often without wanting it" before concluding that, "[…] as you expect from Bowker (writer of the Bafta-winning Marvellous), there is a fierce intelligence at work here, a script which asks some very interesting and important questions but doesn’t force the answers down your throat".

== Awards ==
In November 2016, Capital won the best TV movie/mini series award at the 44th International Emmy Awards.
