= Babou Ceesay =

British actor

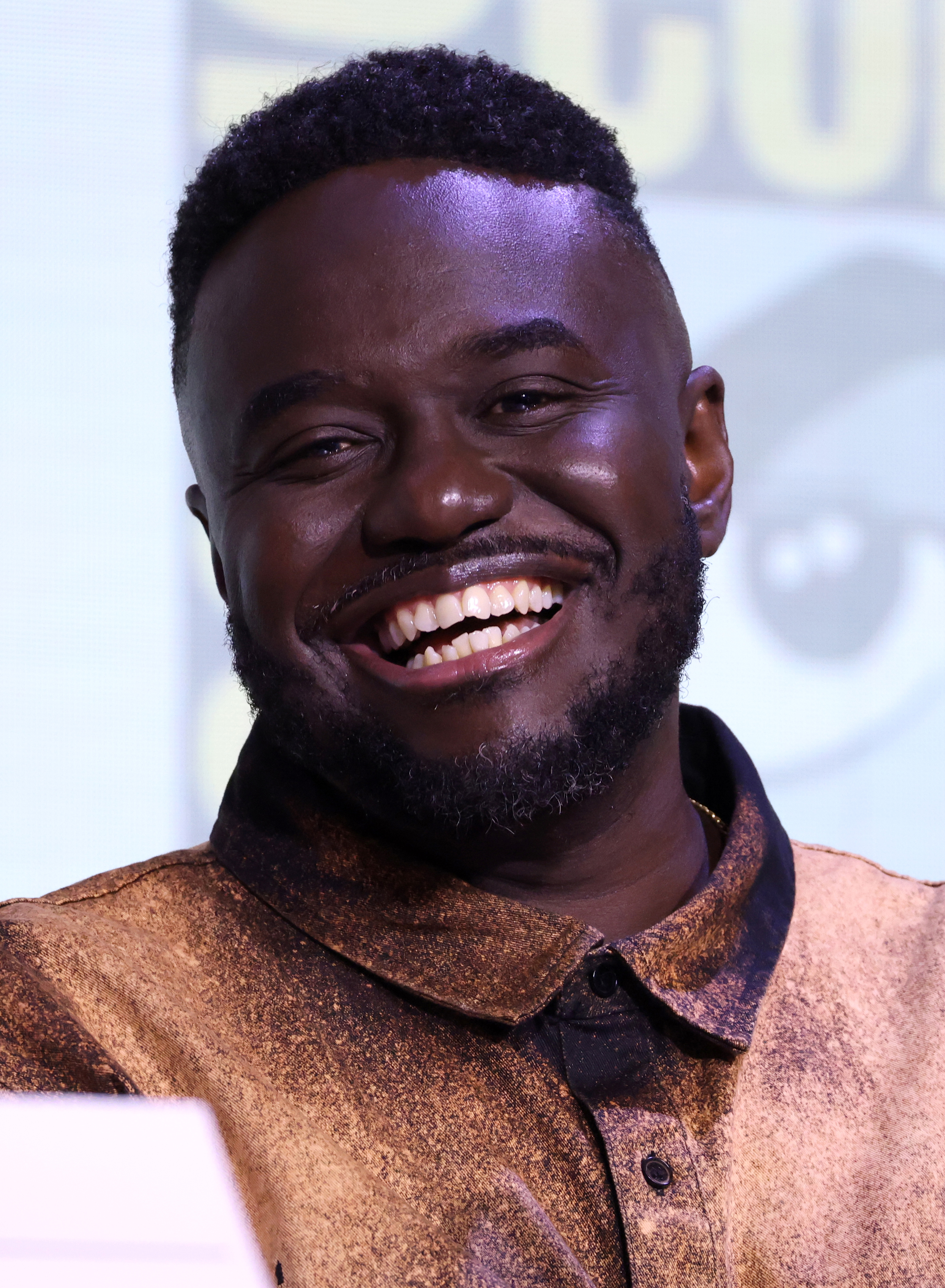
- Ceesay at the 2025 San Diego Comic-Con
- Born: Baboucarr Alieu Ceesay; 17 November 1978 (age 47); London, England
- Education: Imperial College London; Oxford School of Drama
- Occupation: Actor
- Years active: 2006–present
- Spouse: Anna Ceesay
- Children: 2

Baboucarr Alieu Ceesay (born 17 November 1978) is a British actor. His film credits include Eye in the Sky (2015), Rogue One (2016), The Best of Enemies (2019) and Killer Heat (2024). On television, he is known for A.D. The Bible Continues (2015), Guerrilla (2017), Into the Badlands (2018-19) and Alien: Earth (2025-present). He has also been cast in A Knight of the Seven Kingdoms season 2 (2027).

== Early life and education ==
Ceesay was born in London, and grew up in West Africa. He holds dual citizenship and is of Gambian descent. Ceesay trained on the One Year Course at the Oxford School of Drama and has been involved in many significant projects on stage, including The Overwhelming, opposite Andrew Garfield, and A Midsummer Night's Dream. Before attending drama school, Ceesay studied Microbiology at Imperial College London, and also worked as an internal auditor at accounting firm, Deloitte.

== Career ==
Ceesay's first major role was in the horror/comedy film Severance. Two years later, he got a role on TV in an episode of Whistleblower. He made guest appearances in multiple British TV shows, including Silent Witness, Law & Order: UK, Casualty, Strike Back, Luther, Getting On and Lewis.

In 2013, he appeared in the Nigerian film Half of a Yellow Sun, alongside Thandiwe Newton, Chiwetel Ejiofor and another rising star, John Boyega. In 2014, he starred in '71.

In 2015, he was cast in NBC's TV drama A.D. The Bible Continues as John the Apostle. He also appeared in the thriller Eye in the Sky (2015) and the British action comedy Free Fire (2016), set in Boston and starring Brie Larson, Sharlto Copley and Armie Hammer.

He made a return to television with a major role in the Channel 4 drama National Treasure as Jerome Sharp, the lawyer of Paul Finchley, played by Robbie Coltrane. He then starred in a BBC One television movie, Damilola, Our Loved Boy, based on the murder of Damilola Taylor, a ten-year-old Nigerian boy living in London, and the trial that followed. He played the role of the father Richard Taylor, for which he received a BAFTA nomination for Best Actor.

In August 2016, he was cast in the British miniseries Guerrilla, alongside Idris Elba and Freida Pinto.

In 2019, he was cast as Manny Mensah in the BBC One drama television series Dark Money, with John Schwab and Joseph May. He also performed in the American civil rights drama The Best of Enemies (2019), about school integration and an unlikely alliance in a town in North Carolina.

In 2020, Ceesay was cast as DI Jackson Mendy in the Alibi television series We Hunt Together, with Eve Myles, Hermione Corfield and Dipo Ola in the other main roles. In 2021, Paul Abbott's crime drama Wolfe premiered on Sky; in it, Ceesay played the title role as a forensic scientist in Manchester.

In 2025, he took on a lead role of Kumi Morrow, a cyborg, in the sci-fi drama Alien: Earth, part of the Alien franchise.

In March 2026, it was announced that Ceesay had been cast as Ser Bennis in the second season of A Knight of the Seven Kingdoms.

Ceesay joined the cast of Black Doves season 2, which premiered on Netflix in November 2026.

== Personal life ==
He lives in London with his wife, journalist Anna Ceesay, and their two children.

== Filmography ==
=== Film ===
Year	Title	Role	Director	Notes
2006	Severance	Billy	Christopher Smith	
2013	Half of a Yellow Sun	Okeoma	Biyi Bandele	
2014	'71	Corporal	Yann Demange	
2015	Eye in the Sky	Sgt. Mushtaq Saddiq	Gavin Hood	
2016	Free Fire	Martin	Ben Wheatley	
2016	Rogue One	Lt. Sefla	Gareth Edwards	
2019	The Best of Enemies	Bill Riddick	Robin Bissell	
2020	The Show	Second Cabby	Mitch Jenkins	
2021	Resurrection	John the Apostle	Ciarán Donnelly	
2023	Iris	The Doctor	Francis Tamburin	Short film
2024	Killer Heat	Georges Mensah	Philippe Lacôte	
2024	The Backway	Alieu	Cherno Jagne	Short films
2025	Thai Black Tea	Lamin	Ekkawat Pond Sankhavesa	Short films

=== Television ===
Year	Title	Role	Notes
2008	Whistleblower	Dr. Abdulrazzad	Miniseries; Episode #1.1
2008	Silent Witness	DS Gayle	Episode: "Death's Door: Part 2"
2009	Law & Order: UK	Daniel Matoukou	Episode: "Care"
2011	Casualty	Jake Maddick	Episode: "Til Death Us Do Part"
2011	Luther	Adewale Omotoso	Episode #2.3
2011	Stolen	David	Television films
2011	Shirley	Henry Bassey	Television films
2012	Strike Back	Ozzy Osondu	"Vengeance"; 2 episodes
2012	Getting On	Hansley	5 episodes
2013	Lewis	DC Alex Gray	Episode: "The Ramblin' Boy"
2014	Puppy Love	Dennis	Miniseries; 3 episodes
2015	A.D. The Bible Continues	John the Apostle	12 episodes
2016	National Treasure	Jerome	Miniseries; 4 episodes
2016	Damilola, Our Loved Boy	Richard Taylor	Television film
2017	Guerrilla	Marcus Hill	Miniseries; 6 episodes
2018-2019	Into the Badlands	Pilgrim	16 episodes
2019	Dark Money	Manny Mensah	Miniseries; 4 episodes
2020-2022	We Hunt Together	DI Jackson Mendy	12 episodes
2021	Wolfe	Wolfe Kinteh	Miniseries; 6 episodes
2024	Shardlake	Abbot Fabian	Miniseries; 4 episodes
2025-present	Alien: Earth	Kumi Morrow	8 episodes
2026	Black Doves	Mr. Conteh	Season 2
TBA	A Knight of the Seven Kingdoms	Ser Bennis of the Brown Shield	Season 2

=== Video games ===
Year	Title	Role	Notes
2017	Warhammer 40,000: Dawn of War III	Jonah Orion / Eldar	Voice

== Awards and nominations ==
Year	Award	Category	Work	Result
2017	12th Screen Nation Film and Television Awards	Male Performance in TV	Damilola, Our Loved Boy	Nominated
2017	63rd British Academy Television Awards	Best Actor	Damilola, Our Loved Boy	Nominated
2018	Broadcasting Press Guild Awards	Best Actor	Guerrilla	Nominated
