= Monroe (TV series) =

- Genre: Medical drama
- Written by: Peter Bowker
- Directed by: Paul McGuigan; David Moore
- Starring: James Nesbitt; Sarah Parish; Tom Riley
- Country of origin: United Kingdom
- Original language: English
- No. of series: 2
- No. of episodes: 12

Production
- Executive producers: Peter Bowker; Michele Buck; Damien Timmer
- Producer: Jennie Scanlon
- Running time: 46 mins
- Production company: Mammoth Screen

Original release
- Network: ITV
- Release: 10 March 2011 – 5 November 2012

Monroe is a British medical drama television series created and written by Peter Bowker and produced by Mammoth Screen for the ITV network. The series follows a neurosurgeon named Gabriel Monroe, played by James Nesbitt. The six-part series was commissioned by ITV as one of a number of replacements for its long-running police drama series The Bill, which was cancelled in 2010. Filming on Monroe began in Leeds in September 2010, with production based in the old Leeds Girls' High School in Headingley. The first episode was broadcast on ITV on 10 March 2011 to strong ratings. A second series followed in 2012. On 14 November 2012, it was announced that ITV had cancelled Monroe due to low viewing figures.

== Development ==
Screenwriter Peter Bowker announced to the trade magazine Broadcast in July 2009 that he was developing a "big medical drama" for ITV. Bowker had worked on medical dramas early in his career, including Casualty and Medics. ITV's director of drama Laura Mackie told The Stage that the series would be "grown-up" and would be based around a single character, like ITV's Doc Martin. Mackie believed that other broadcasters were reluctant to create series with one lead character—instead making ensemble shows like Casualty and Holby City—so Bowker's series would not overlap with anything already being screened.

Bowker told the Media Guardian that he had been inspired to create a series about a neurologist after his four-year-old daughter was diagnosed with a benign brain tumour. He wanted the drama of Monroe to be similar to the American medical series House; "It may be foolish to compare the two but with neurologists, as with House, there is this very intense 10 days when you work with them on a case and then you say goodbye – it is really quite fascinating and will hopefully make great drama." Independent production company Mammoth Screen developed the series with Bowker, having previously worked with him on his Wuthering Heights adaptation. The drama entered the pre-production stage in March 2010, when Laura Mackie and ITV's director of television Peter Fincham commissioned it for the network. Formal greenlighting was expected to happen in the first week of April 2010.

Film director Paul McGuigan signed on as lead director of Monroe. McGuigan researched the nature of the series by meeting with neurosurgeons and watching a brain operation being performed. Steve Lawes, with whom McGuigan worked on his other television series, Sherlock, was originally announced as the director of photography. McGuigan directed the first three episodes of the series, and David Moore directed the last three. The cast and crew met for a script read-through the week before filming began and the principal cast attended a "boot camp" at Leeds General Infirmary.

== Production ==
Filming on the series commenced on 26 September 2010. The principal setting of St Matthews Hospital has been created within the former Leeds Girls' High School. Eight weeks were spent converting the school into the hospital set, with the ward set built in the old library.

== Characters ==
- James Nesbitt as Mister Gabriel Monroe. Brilliant but unusual neurosurgeon. Recently divorced from Anna, with a son Nick in university.
- Sarah Parish as Miss Jenny Bremner. Talented, but somewhat aloof cardiothoracic surgeon, in a relationship with Dr Shepherd and at the start of season 2 has just returned from maternity leave.
- Tom Riley as Dr. Lawrence Shepherd. An anaesthetist, he is Monroe's best friend and is in a relationship with Miss Bremner, and has a baby Louis with her.
- Neil Pearson as Mr. Alistair Gillespie. General surgeon and newly appointed Head of Clinical Services at St Matthew's.
- Manjinder Virk as Miss Sally Fortune. Neurosurgical Registrar working under Mr. Monroe.
- Luke Allen-Gale as Mr. Daniel Springer. An over-enthusiastic neurosurgical trainee. He is often seen as obnoxious and arrogant but charming.
- Michelle Asante as Miss Kitty Wilson. Neurosurgical trainee, she is shy and weak-stomached, and initially had difficulty making it through operations, Monroe however sees her potential.
- Christina Chong as Miss Sarah Witney. Cardiothoracic Registrar working under Ms. Bremner.
- Andrew Gower as Mr. Andrew Mullery. Initially a cardiothoracic surgical trainee, he is now a registrar under Gillespie specialising in general and vascular surgery.
- Tracy-Ann Oberman as Lizzie Clapham. Clinical Nurse Specialist dealing with neurosurgical and cardiothoracic patients' emotional needs.
- Lisa Millet as Jill McHeath. Ward Nurse, Cottingley Ward.
- Thomas Morrison as Lee Bradley. Hospital Porter, also an unofficial bookie, poker enthusiast and lover of greyhounds. He regularly entertains Monroe and Shepherd with his philosophy on life.
- Susan Lynch as Anna Monroe. Monroe's ex-wife.
- Perry Millward as Nick Monroe. Monroe's son.
- Andrew Munroe as Marlon Brown. Monroe's High School friend.

== Casting ==
Actor James Nesbitt, who starred in Bowker's Iraq War drama Occupation, told the Radio Times in May 2010 that he had been cast in the series. The ITV Press Centre confirmed Nesbitt's involvement on the same day the magazine was published, and announced that he would be playing the title role and that the series would commence filming in Leeds in September 2010 for broadcast in 2011. To research the role, Nesbitt watched surgery being performed and consulted neurosurgeon Philip Van Hille. Nesbitt said of Van Hille's advice, "It's been extremely important as I knew nothing about it [neurosurgery]. He taught me technique, but most of all he taught me about the relationship with patients." Monroe is described by ITV as "a brilliant and unusual neurosurgeon – a flawed genius who never lets anyone forget his flaws or his genius."

ITV's Autumn/Winter 2010 press pack refers to other characters in the series: "[Monroe's] trainees, his anaesthetist, his poker school – and his female colleague, heart surgeon Jenny Bremner, who has contempt for his cockiness." While appearing on This Morning to promote his role in Mammoth Screen's Bouquet of Barbed Wire, actor Tom Riley announced that he would be playing Monroe's anaethestist. To research the role, he met with anaesthetists in Leeds shortly before filming began, and watched brain surgery being performed on 20 September. Riley revealed the name of the character as Laurence Shepherd on Twitter.

The ITV Press Centre announced on 23 September the further casting of Sarah Parish as Jenny Bremner, Manjinder Virk as registrar Sally Fortune, Susan Lynch as Monroe's wife Anna, and Luke Allen-Gale and Michelle Asante as Daniel Springer and Kitty Wilson, two of Monroe's trainees. Liz Hume-Dawson plays theatre nurse Wicken in at least four episodes. Hume-Dawson has previously portrayed medical professionals in such productions as Bodies. Andrew Gower, a Spotlight Prize winner, plays regular character Dr Mullery, in his first professional role.

== Broadcast ==
Episode 1 of Monroe was broadcast on 10 March 2011 at 9 pm then each of the remaining 5 were shown weekly until 14 April 2011.

ITV commissioned a second series from Mammoth Screen in July 2011, to begin production in 2012. It screened in October and November 2012.

== Series overview ==
Series	Episodes	Originally released	
Series	Episodes	First released	Last released
1	6	10 March 2011	14 April 2011
2	6	1 October 2012	5 November 2012

== Episodes ==
=== Series 1 (2011) ===
No.	Title	Directed by	Written by	Original release date	Viewers (millions)
1	"Episode One"	Peter Bowker	Paul McGuigan	10 March 2011	6.85 (Note: 6.32 million on ITV1, 279,000 on the ITV1 HD simulcast, and 251,000 on ITV1+1.)
When a woman is admitted to hospital with a brain tumour, neurosurgeon Gabriel Monroe has to help her decide whether to undergo surgery that could save her life, but also carries the risk of her being left paralysed or unable to speak. Meanwhile, the medic's home life and relationship with his wife spirals out of control.
2	"Episode Two"	Peter Bowker	Paul McGuigan	17 March 2011	5.72 (Note: 5.22 million on ITV, 285,000 on the ITV1 HD simulcast, and 215,000 on ITV+1.)
Monroe struggles to accept that his wife has left him and tries to find the courage to tell his son the truth about why his marriage ended. At the hospital, he has to deal with the aftermath of a double shooting, Bremner is forced to justify the way she relates to her patients, and Springer meets his match in the form of a fearsome theatre nurse.
3	"Episode Three"	Peter Bowker	Paul McGuigan	24 March 2011	5.71 (Note: 5.26 million on ITV, 227,000 on the ITV HD simulcast, and 227,000 on ITV+1.)
A former soldier is admitted to the hospital with a blood clot in his brain and Monroe controversially decides against surgery. Bremner is tempted to break her own rule about remaining detached from her patients, and Springer tries to cover up the fact that he has 'mislaid' a patient.
4	"Episode Four"	Peter Bowker	David Moore	31 March 2011	5.53 (Note: 5.05 million on ITV, 313,000 on the ITV HD simulcast, and 168,000 on ITV+1.)
Monroe finds that 'civilised divorce' is much harder than he had imagined and his attempts to enter the world of dating seem doomed to failure. At the hospital, he tries to persuade an epileptic man to have an operation that could stop his religious hallucinations, and Bremner is furious to find that she is the subject of gossip about her relationship with Shepherd.
5	"Episode Five"	Peter Bowker	David Moore	7 April 2011	4.96 (Note: 4.41 million on ITV, 323,000 on the ITV HD simulcast, and 227,000 on ITV+1.)
The neurosurgeon has to confront the prospect of operating on a colleague when registrar Sally Fortune collapses. Bremner reaches a decision about her relationship with Shepherd, and Monroe helps his estranged wife Anna build a new life.
6	"Episode Six"	Peter Bowker	David Moore	14 April 2011	5.14 (Note: 4.72 million on ITV, 267,000 on the ITV HD simulcast, and 148,000 on ITV+1.)
When a 13-year-old girl is admitted to hospital after a road accident, Monroe believes there is little chance of saving her and an operation could leave her severely damaged. However, her father begs him to operate and give her a chance to live. The trainees face their final assessments and Shepherd considers leaving following his break-up with Bremner.

=== Series 2 (2012) ===
Series 2 begins on Monday 1 October 2012

No.	Title	Directed by	Written by	Original release date	Viewers (millions)
7	"Episode One"	Peter Bowker	Damon Thomas	1 October 2012	4.67 (Note: 4.36 million on ITV and ITV HD, and 312,000 on ITV+1.)
Paul Herd (Jody Latham) and his pregnant wife Julie (Julia Haworth) ask Monroe for help. Paul has been refused surgery by other hospitals for a dangerous neurological condition and Monroe has to decide whether to operate, putting him in conflict with Gillespie. Eighteen months have passed since the last episode, Monroe has moved into his new bachelor pad, while Shepherd and Bremner are now parents to baby Louis. Today is Bremner’s first day back after maternity leave. There is a new Head of Clinical Services Alistair Gillespie (Neil Pearson) and he is making life difficult for Bremner and Monroe. Witney (Christina Chong) has been promoted to registrar, Mullery (Andrew Gower) has transferred to General Surgery and is now working under Gillespie; Monroe also invites his ex-wife to dinner with her new Boyfriend Dave (Simon Chadwick) Monroe must also choose between Wilson and Springer to promote to registrar.
8	"Episode Two"	Peter Bowker	Damon Thomas	8 October 2012	4.30 (Note: 3.78 million on ITV and ITV HD, and 520,000 on ITV+1.)
Neuro Cases : Teenager Shelley Maxwell (Amelia Young) comes to Monroe for surgery due to a malfunctioning brain shunt. Lynn Monkford (Caroline Strong) has terminal brain cancer, Monroe has formed a close relationship with her husband Mike (Sean Gilder), she is here for surgery to reduce the size of her tumour and make her last year more pleasant. Cardio Cases: Graham Birdwell (Martin Walsh) is about to undergo a double heart bypass with the help of his mentally disabled brother Geoffrey (Tim Dantay) Shepard is finding life with Bremner difficult and starts looking for comfort elsewhere
9	"Episode Three"	Peter Bowker	Brian Kelly	15 October 2012	3.73 (Note: 3.41 million on ITV and ITV HD, and 317,000 on ITV1+1.)
Monroe is still reeling from the result of Lynn Monkford surgery in the previous episode. He makes his decision on whom to promote to registrar. Shepard is left to deal with what he did the previous night, he and Bremner decide to try counselling to repair their relationship. Neuro Cases : Alex Schofield (Gwilym Lee), a boy with a Benign tumour in his spine A rugby fan with a knife on his brain seems to get Monroe back on his feet Cardio Cases: Bremner (Sarah Parish) and Witney deal with a 5-year-old Pakistani refugee Yalda Sahni (Sophie Mohammed) who has Tetralogy of Fallot
10	"Episode Four"	Lucy Gannon	Damon Thomas	22 October 2012	3.89 (Note: 3.59 million on ITV and ITV HD, and 292,000 on ITV+1.)
Monroe's confidence has returned, and with his ex-wife happily involved with her new boyfriend Dave, he decides to take new colleague Lizzie out on a date. Shepard and Bremner are doing their best to play happy families, but the underlying issues are still festering. This episode also featured the first appearance of Andrew Munroe, a life-long friend of Monroe, who attended the same high school. However, it is not talking terms for the pair, as Andrew's wife is admitted to the hospital after a series of violent crimes. Neuro Cases : Sally Indale (Jennifer Hennessey) has been experiencing fitting and episodes of aggression, and she is found to have a large aneurysm in her temporal lobe. Monroe believes that by correcting the problem he can restore her old personality. Cardio Cases: Max Portas (David Ajala), an amateur footballer, has myocarditis. He is refusing treatment, and Witney spends the night with him trying to talk him round.
11	"Episode Five"	Peter Bowker	Brian Kelly	29 October 2012	3.93 (Note: 3.56 million on ITV and ITV HD, and 368,000 on ITV+1.)
Shepherd has moved into Monroes. Springer has some legal issues Neuro Cases : Bridget Addy (Michelle Holmes), a lady with epilepsy is having problematic seizures Monroe decides to take out the part of her brain that is causing the problem. Lizzie (Tracy-Ann Oberman) hauls her ex-husband in to offer support Cardio Cases: Grace Bushnall (Rebecca Ryan), a teenager waiting for a heart transplant, she has been waiting for a new heart for years but now is having doubts and wants to back out. Gillespie (Neil Pearson) is beginning to trust Mullery (Andrew Gower) more and more, they deal with a man who requires a graft to his entire aorta. At the end of the day Lizzie, Monroe, Shepherd and Bremner all come to surprising conclusions about their love lives
12	"Episode Six"	Peter Bowker	Brian Kelly	5 November 2012	4.24 (Note: 4.08 million on ITV and ITV HD, and 166,000 on ITV+1.)
Monroe has informed Bremner after Shepard's activities. Witney appears to have decided that it's time to leave St Matthew’s. Monroe decides to throw a stag party for his son Nick. Meanwhile at the hospital Springer is introducing Jacob Namobu (Ukweli Roach), a young medical student to neurosurgery. Things don't go to plan when there is a large road traffic accident. This night the truth will be revealed, someone will die, and someone will resign.
