= Care (Law & Order: UK) =

First episode of Law & Order: UK

- Law & Order: UK episode
- First intertitle from the episode
- Episode no.: Series 1 Episode 1
- Directed by: Omar Madha
- Written by: Chris Chibnall
- Based on: "Cradle to Grave" by Robert Nathan and Sally Nemeth
- Original air date: 23 February 2009

Guest appearances
- Lorraine Ashbourne as Maureen Walters; Patrick Malahide as Robert Ridley QC

Episode chronology
← Previous —	Next → "Unloved"
- Law & Order: UK series 1

"Care" is the first episode of the British police procedural and legal television programme, Law & Order: UK. "Care" follows the case of a dead infant dropped off at a hospital to the corrupt estate agent whose negligence caused his death. Written by Chris Chibnall, directed by Omar Madha, and produced by Richard Stokes, "Care" originally aired on 23 February 2009.

The episode is based on the original Law & Order second season episode, "Cradle to Grave" which was written by Robert Nathan and Sally Nemeth and originally aired on 31 March 1992.

== Plot ==
After midnight on 6 January, the corpse of a poisoned nine-month-old boy is found in a holdall at Royal Hope Hospital. Brooks and Devlin's investigation leads them to Kings Cross; there, they find the child's flat and a sabotaged gas heater: the source of his poisoning. Following leads to the child's mother, Dionne Farrah (Venetia Campbell), they then investigate the babysitter, Serena Jackson (Angela Terence), whose statement leads the detectives back to Farrah's fellow tenant Mike Turner (Tony Maudsley). Turner has been hired by the flat's management company to harass the tenants into leaving, so that the owner—Maureen Walters (Ashbourne)—can renovate the units for better capital gain.

Represented by the devious and unprincipled Robert Ridley QC (Malahide), Turner is charged with damaging the Farrah's heating unit, causing the fatal gassing of the child. However, on 7 April, the judge is forced to declare a mistrial after the building's French-speaking caretaker, Daniel Matoukou (Babou Ceesay), is improperly translated. Uncovering that Walters has been paying bribes to environmental inspection officials, DS Brooks (Walsh) secures such evidence as to bring her to trial for failing to maintain the flats and leading to the boy's death. After Turner flips on Walters for a reduced sentence, the jury finds her guilty on 5 May.

== Production ==
Regarding the opening scene, where two PCSOs discuss which should open the holdall they suspect contains a bomb, Producer Richard Stokes conceded that in reality, they would have called the bomb squad. On the series as a whole, he admitted, "if there's a choice between technical accuracy and powerful drama, the drama will always win."

== Reception ==
=== Critical reception ===
Universal Studios' Universal Playback summarized the episode and related positive critical input from reviewers. Andrew Billen from The Times expected the series to be successful based on the showing of "Care", and TV Times said that "those concerned can give themselves a pat on the back because [the episode] really, really works."

Radio Times reviewer Alison Graham felt the episode didn't live up to the original Law & Order's pacing, saying that it could have been accomplished in half the time taken. She also didn't care for the story, saying "it falls headfirst into a typically British legal-drama trap of the noble prosecutor [...] crusading to bring the guilty to justice while pitted against the louche, self-serving defence barrister [...]. No, sorry, that's just too cliched. And wrong."

Scott Matthewman of The Stage thought the episode's exposition was too obvious in explaining the characters' roles and responsibilities; "they go round talking to each other like none of them have ever done this before." This complaint seems solely registered at "Care", however, as he found the following episode ("Unloved") didn't suffer the same.

Janet Daley, blogger for The Daily Telegraph, decried the episode's apparent unwillingness to take on controversial topics in the same vein as the original Law & Order. Instead, "the black single mother [...] proves to be a blameless saint, [and] "her vindictive capitalist employers" and "heartless, property developing landlady" are the ones at fault.

=== Viewer reception ===
Upon its premiere, "Care" won its overnight time slot with 6.4 million viewers, ultimately reining in 6.96 million. As of September 2010, members of the user-contributed television review sites the Internet Movie Database and TV.com rated "Care" a 7.1 and 7.7 (rated "Good") out of 10 respectively.
