= Moses Jones =

British television crime drama series

- Genre: Crime drama • Thriller
- Written by: Joe Penhall
- Directed by: Michael Offer
- Starring: Shaun Parkes; Matt Smith; Eamonn Walker; Dennis Waterman; Indira Varma; Jude Akuwudike; Wunmi Mosaku; Obi Abili
- Country of origin: United Kingdom
- Original language: English
- No. of seasons: 1
- No. of episodes: 3

Production
- Executive producers: Joe Penhall; Hilary Salmon
- Producer: Cameron Roach
- Cinematography: Tim Fleming
- Editor: Sarah Brewerton
- Running time: 60 minutes

Original release
- Network: BBC Two
- Release: 2 February – 16 February 2009

Moses Jones is a British television crime drama series first broadcast on BBC Two in February 2009. The series was written by Joe Penhall, directed by Michael Offer and produced by Cameron Roach. The series follows DI Moses Jones (Shaun Parkes), a Scotland Yard detective who is seconded onto an enquiry investigating a mutilated body found floating in the Thames. The complete series was released on DVD on 9 March 2009.

== Synopsis ==
The discovery of the bizarrely mutilated body in the Thames who seems to have been the victim of a ritualistic witchcraft killing sparks a wave of violence amongst London's Ugandan exile community. DI Moses Jones (Shaun Parkes) is seconded to the case from Scotland Yard due to his supposed cultural links with the local African community and assisted by young, hopeful DS Dan Twentyman (Matt Smith), he sets out to uncover the truth.

Jones and Twentyman find their investigations lead to the victim's niece Joy (Wunmi Mosaku) and her friend Solomon (Eamonn Walker) at the Afrigo Club where the ex-pat community go to unwind to the African beats of Solomon's band. As the investigation continues, the violence escalates and the evidence all seems to point towards Matthias Mutukula (Jude Akuwudike), a mysterious godfather figure rumoured to have both terror links and supernatural powers.

Forced to ask himself tough questions about his cultural identity, Moses Jones embarks on a frightening quest to track down his man and redeem himself before the community implodes... or takes revenge itself.

== Cast ==
- Shaun Parkes - DI Moses Jones
- Matt Smith - DS Dan Twentyman
- Eamonn Walker - Solomon
- Wunmi Mosaku - Joy
- Femi Elufowoju Jr. - Peter
- David Fishley - Paul
- Jude Akuwudike - Matthias Mutukula
- Obi Abili - Joseph
- Indira Varma - Dolly
- Dennis Waterman - Frank Costello
- Tom Goodman-Hill - DCI Dick Catherwood
- Christianne Oliveira - Lita
- Ellen Thomas - Libby Jones
- Mark Oliver - Selwyn
- Shaun Dingwall - Roger Dankorth
- Struan Rodger - Father Fred Bone
- Lee Ross - Mick Mahoney
- Adam Kotz - Dr. Michael Michaels
