= John Lanchester =

British journalist and novelist

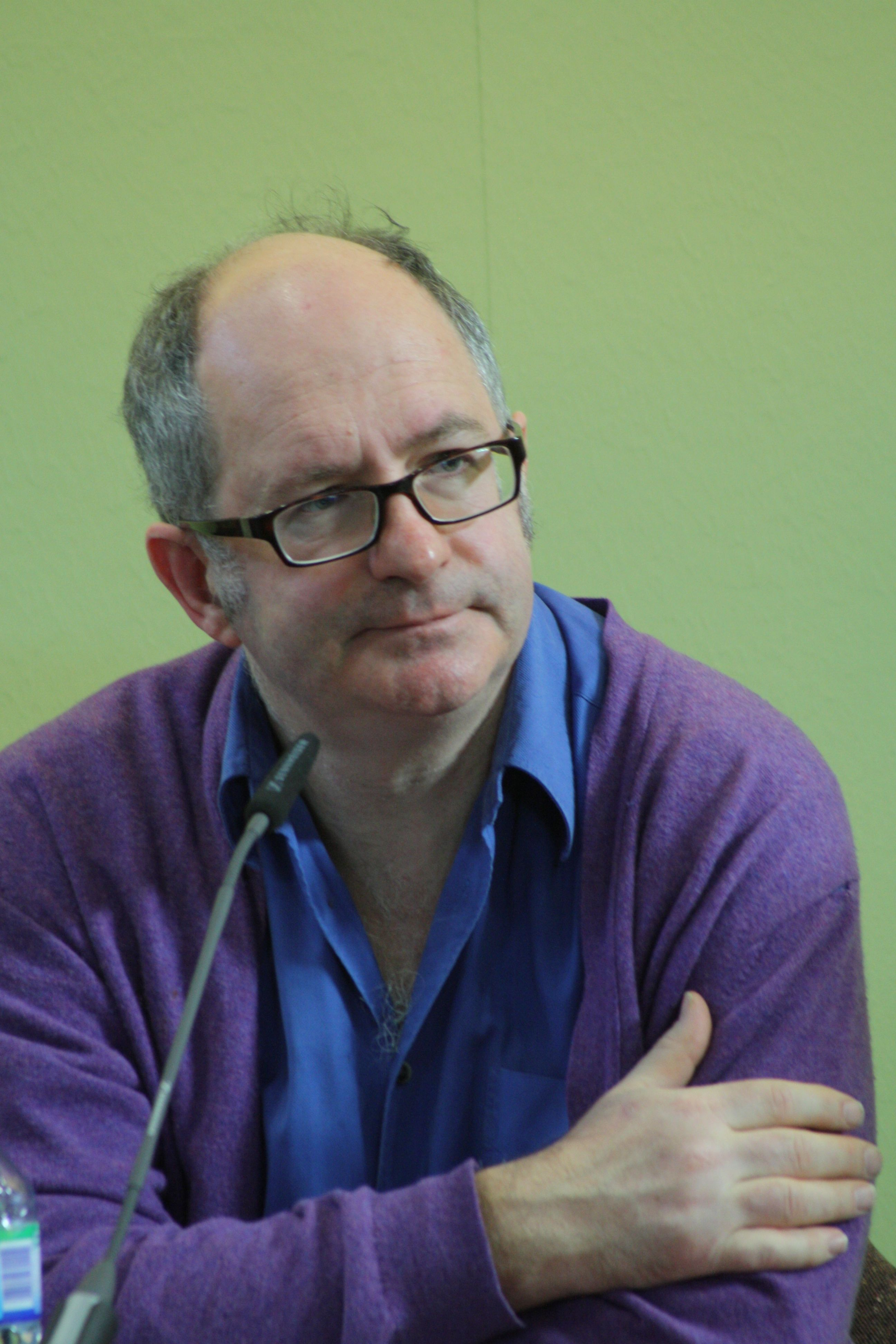
- Leipzig 2013
- Born: 25 February 1962 (age 64); Hamburg, West Germany
- Education: Gresham's School
- Alma mater: St John's College, Oxford
- Spouse: Miranda Carter
- Children: 2
- Writing career
- Language: English
- Genres: Literary fiction, Business
- Notable awards: Whitbread Book Award; 1996; E. M. Forster Award; 2008

John Henry Lanchester (born 25 February 1962) is a British journalist and novelist. His book reviews appear frequently for the London Review of Books.

== Life ==
He was born in Hamburg, brought up in Hong Kong and educated in England; between 1972 and 1980 at Gresham's School in Holt, Norfolk, then at St John's College, Oxford.

He is married to historian and author Miranda Carter, with whom he has two children, and lives in London.

Lanchester was elected a Fellow of the Royal Society of Literature in 2002.

== Works ==
Lanchester is the author of novels, a memoir, non-fiction and journalism.

His journalism has appeared in the London Review of Books (where he is a Contributing Editor), Granta, The Observer, The New York Review of Books, The Guardian, the Daily Telegraph and The New Yorker. He also regularly writes on food and technology for Esquire.

The Debt to Pleasure (1996) won the 1996 Whitbread Book Award in the First Novel category and the 1997 Hawthornden Prize. It was described as a skilful and wickedly funny account of the life of a loquacious Englishman named Tarquin Winot, revealed through his thoughts on cuisine as he undertakes a mysterious journey around France. The revelations become more and more shocking as the truth about the narrator becomes apparent. He is a monster, and yet an appealing and erudite villain.

Mr Phillips (2000) describes one day in the life of Victor Phillips, a middle-aged accountant who has been made redundant, but has yet to tell his family. He spends the day travelling round London, with the narrative dividing itself between reporting Mr Phillips' observations about what he sees, and also exploring his recollections of things in the past, or his own taboo-like preoccupations, with sex and social obligation. The book deals with other male, middle-class concerns, including money, family and getting older.

Fragrant Harbour (2002) is set in Hong Kong in the 1980s. It tells the stories of three immigrants to the island—an ambitious and increasingly self-confident female English journalist who has recently arrived, an elderly English hotel-keeper who came in the 1930s; a young Chinese man who came as a child refugee from mainland China.

His memoir Family Romance (2007) recounts the story of his mother, a nun who walked out of the convent, changed her name, falsified her age, and concealed these facts from her husband and son until her death.

2010 saw the publication of Lanchester's book Whoops! Why Everyone Owes Everyone and No One Can Pay (titled I.O.U.: Why Everyone Owes Everyone and No One Can Pay outside the UK). It is an explanation of the 2008 financial crisis for general readers.

Capital (2012) is a satirical novel set in London prior to and during the 2008 financial crisis and the Great Recession, telling of the crisis' effect on characters living in a fictional street in Clapham, a suburb of south London. The book deals with contemporary issues in British life including immigration, Islamic extremism, celebrity, and property prices. The book was adapted into a three-part TV series for BBC 1, first broadcast on 24 November 2015.

In 2013 he was invited by The Guardian to examine materials from Edward Snowden, and on 4 October wrote "The Snowden files: why the British public should be worried about GCHQ".

Lanchester wrote the introduction to a 2012 edition of Empire of the Sun by J. G. Ballard, an author whose work resonates with him.

The Wall (2019) is set in a dystopic near-future Britain, where rising sea-levels and climate change have led to a breakdown in world-wide social and economic order. The title refers to a concrete fortification constructed along the entire British coast, populated by conscripted Defenders responsible for preventing the Others (refugees) from reaching the British mainland (where the British population enjoy relative stability and prosperity). The story is told from the perspective of Kavanagh, a young man beginning his mandatory two-year tour of duty as a Defender on the Wall. The novel deals with themes of inter-generational guilt, international inequality, cross-Channel refugee migration, climate change, and slavery. The Wall was included on the Booker Prize longlist for 2019. His 2026 book published by Faber and Faber is titled Look What You Made Me Do.

== Bibliography ==
=== Books ===
==== Fiction ====
- —— (1996). The Debt to Pleasure. London: Picador. ISBN 9780330344548.
- —— (2000). Mr Phillips. New York: Viking Penguin. ISBN 9780399146046.
- —— (2002). Fragrant Harbour. Toronto: National Geographic Books.
- —— (2012). Capital. New York: W. W. Norton & Company. ISBN 9780393082074.
- —— (2019). The Wall. London: Faber & Faber. ISBN 9780571298723.
- —— (2020). Reality and Other Stories. London: Faber & Faber. ISBN 9780571363001.
- —— (2026). Look What You Made Me Do. London: Faber & Faber. ISBN 9780571298662.

==== Non-fiction ====
- —— (2007). Family Romance. Toronto: National Geographic Books. ISBN 9780771046094.
- —— (2010). Whoops! Why Everyone Owes Everyone and No One Can Pay. London: Allen Lane. ISBN 9781846142857.
- —— (2013). What We Talk About When We Talk About the Tube: The District Line. London: Penguin Publishing. ISBN 9781846145292.
- —— (2014). How to Speak Money: What the Money People Say—And What It Really Means. New York: National Geographic Books. ISBN 9780393243376.

=== Essays and reporting ===
- "Unlikeabilityfest". London Review of Books. 33 (4): 24. 17 February 2011.
- "1979 and all that : Margaret Thatcher's revolution". The Critics. A Critic at Large. The New Yorker. 89 (23): 68–72. 5 August 2013.
- "Money talks : learning the language of finance". Annals of Argot. The New Yorker. 90 (22): 30–33. 4 August 2014.
- "The Snowden files: why the British public should be worried about GCHQ". The Guardian: 17. 4 October 2013.
- "The robots are coming". London Review of Books. 37 (5): 3–8. 5 March 2015. Retrieved 4 November 2017.
- "When Bitcoin Grows Up". London Review of Books. 38 (8): 3–12. 21 April 2016.
- "You Are the Product". London Review of Books. 39 (16): 3–10. 17 August 2017.
- "After the Fall". London Review of Books. 40 (13): 3–8. 5 July 2018.
- "Good New Idea: Universal Basic Income". London Review of Books. 41 (14): 5–8. 18 July 2019. (Universal Basic Income)
- "Chinese Cyber-Sovereignty". London Review of Books. 41 (19). 10 October 2019. (aspects of Cyber sovereignty and mass surveillance in China such as the fifty-cent army, Great Firewall)
- "As the Lock Rattles". London Review of Books. 43 (24). 16 December 2021.
- "Fraudpocalypse". London Review of Books. 44 (15). 4 August 2022.
- "Inside the Thatcher Larp". London Review of Books. 44 (20). 20 October 2022.
- "Putting the Silicon in Silicon Valley". London Review of Books. 45 (6). 16 March 2023.
- "Get a Rabbit". London Review of Books. 45 (18). 21 September 2023.
- "He-Said, They-Said". London Review of Books. 45 (21). 2 November 2023.
- "For Every Winner a Loser". London Review of Books. 46 (17). 12 September 2024.
- "King of Cannibal Island". London Review of Books. 47 (23). 25 December 2025.
