= Capital (novel) =

2012 novel by John Lanchester

- Author: John Lanchester
- Publisher: Faber & Faber
- Publication date: 20 February 2012
- Media type: Print (Hardcover)
- ISBN: 978-0-571-23460-8
- Dewey Decimal: 823/.914
- LC Class: PR6062.A4863C37 2012

Capital is a novel by John Lanchester, published by Faber & Faber in 2012. The novel is set in London before and during the 2008 financial crisis, jumping between December 2007, April 2008, and August 2008. The title refers both to London as the capital city of the United Kingdom, and to financial capital. All of the main characters have a connection to Pepys Road, a street in the south London suburb of Clapham.

The book deals with multiple contemporary issues in British life including the 2008 financial crisis, immigration, Islamic extremism, celebrity, and property prices. In 2015 a three-part TV adaptation by Peter Bowker, and starring Lesley Sharp and Toby Jones, was filmed. The first episode was broadcast on BBC One on 24 November 2015.

== Characters ==
- Petunia Howe - an elderly widow who has lived on Pepys Road for most of her life. Her husband was Albert who died before the story starts.
  - Mary - her adult daughter who lives in Essex
  - Alan - Mary's husband
  - Smitty - Mary's son and Petunia's grandson, a celebrated but anonymous artist similar to Banksy
- Roger Yount - has a highly paid job in investment banking
  - Arabella - his shopaholic wife
  - Mark - his ambitious deputy at work
- Ahmed and Rohinka Kamal - Pakistani immigrants who live on Pepys Road above their family shop, a convenience store
  - Shahid and Usman - Ahmed's brothers who sometimes work in the shop
  - Mrs Kamal - mother of Ahmed, Shahid and Usman, who comes to visit from Lahore
- Freddy Kamo - talented footballer from Senegal who moves to London to play for a Premier League club, and lives on Pepys Road with Patrick, his father.
  - Mickey - "gopher" at Freddy's football club who also manages the house where Freddy and Patrick live
- Quentina Mkfesi - a highly educated asylum seeker from Zimbabwe, working illegally as a traffic warden on Pepys Road.
- Zbigniew (Bogdan) - migrant Polish builder from Warsaw who works on houses in Pepys Road, later called in to work in Petunia's house.

== Reception ==
Capital was well received by critics.

Reviewing the book in The Observer, Claire Tomalin began by noting, "Dickens was a reporter before he became a novelist, and his reporter's instincts remained strong, especially in his 'condition of England' novels, from Bleak House to Our Mutual Friend. John Lanchester also has a reputation as a reporter and as a novelist, and with this 'big, fat London novel' he is writing a report on London in 2008, peopling it with fictional but precisely observed Londoners – a touch of Mayhew as well as Dickens. His documentation is sharp and vivid as he follows their adventures". She found that, "A few strands of the narrative don't quite work, but the best ones make you turn the pages faster to find out where they are going. There is a moral fable about money, so neatly done that its resolution comes as a shock". Overall, Tomalin concluded, "He tells a good story. He gives you a lot to think about. This is an intelligent and entertaining account of our grubby, uncertain, fragmented London society that has almost replaced religion with shopping. Read it."

Reviewing Capital for The Daily Telegraph, Keith Miller gave it a full five stars and began by writing, "The first thing to say about John Lanchester is that a sizeable number of concerned economic illiterates have him and none other to thank for whatever portion of their sanity they managed to hang on to when the banking system went south in the late 2000s. His journalism in the London Review of Books and elsewhere and his book Whoops! explained roughly what was going on in terms that even a humanities graduate could understand [...] Lanchester's was an intelligent, humorous and eminently reasonable voice among all the gibbering. If there's a knighthood going spare by any chance, he should get it nem con". He found the book to be, "a more or less unimpeachably plausible portrait of one (fictional) street in Clapham, a popular south London 'village' where a spacious but fairly hideous Victorian house can command a price approaching a hundred times the UK's median annual income". Miller warned against the "obvious-seeming parallels with Dickens" finding instead, "A more credible parallel is with Honoré de Balzac: like Balzac, Lanchester has the brains to relate the particular to the general; the ruthlessness to make bad things happen to good people (though good people are in short supply in Capital); the steadiness of hand to draw unpalatable conclusions (poor immigrants really do despise affluent white Londoners; some of our neighbours really do want to blow us up; we fall in love with our nannies not because they are younger and prettier than our wives but because they're kinder-hearted and more companionable); and, crucially, the courage to bore his readers a little, at times, rather than leave them underinformed". Miller noted Lanchester's avoidance of moralising but concluded by saying, "Yet some of the book's 'lessons' [...] seem a shade limited: limiting, even".
