= List of Law & Order: UK episodes =

Law & Order: UK is a British police procedural and legal television programme, adapted from the American series Law & Order. The programme is financed by the production companies Kudos Film and Television, Wolf Films, and Universal Media Studios. Chris Chibnall, the first head writer, set the practice of adapting episodes from the American series, which continued after he left the production. Through the eight series, 53 episodes have been borrowed from across the 456 episode American run, ranging from the first American episode being used in series 5 of Law & Order: UK, through a final (20th) season American episode used in series 6 of the UK version.

Law & Order: UK is based in London. The original cast consisted of Bradley Walsh, Freema Agyeman, Ben Daniels, Jamie Bamber, Bill Paterson, and Harriet Walter, whilst the final cast featured Walsh, Sharon Small, Ben Bailey Smith, Dominic Rowan, Georgia Taylor, and Peter Davison. Paul Nicholls and Paterson Joseph also starred.

The series premiered worldwide on ITV on Thursday 23 February 2009. As of 11 June 2014, a total of 53 episodes have been shown globally. Internationally, the programme is broadcast in thirteen-episode runs; however, in Britain, each thirteen-episode run is broadcast in two halves – one containing seven episodes, and the other containing the remaining six. This results in several episodes being broadcast in foreign countries months before their British broadcast. The series premiered in America on BBC America on 3 October 2010.

In June 2014, broadcaster ITV and producer Kudos issued a joint press release announcing that series 8 would be "the last to be transmitted for the foreseeable future". By coincidence, the final episode aired the following week, delayed from its planned 30 April airdate due to a plot which incorporated events considered too similar to 28 April murder of teacher Ann Maguire.

== Series overview ==
Series	Episodes	Originally released	
Series	Episodes	First released	Last released
1	7	23 February 2009	6 April 2009
2	6	11 January 2010	15 February 2010
3	7	9 September 2010	21 October 2010
4	6	21 March 2011	11 April 2011
5	6	11 July 2011	14 August 2011
6	7	6 January 2012	17 February 2012
7	6	14 July 2013	18 August 2013
8	8	12 March 2014	11 June 2014

== Episodes ==
=== Series 1 (2009) ===
No. overall	No. in series	Title	Directed by	Written by	Original release date	UK viewers (millions)	Original Law & Order episode
1	1	"Care"	Omar Madha	Chris Chibnall	23 February 2009	6.96 million	"Cradle to Grave" (31 March 1992)
2	2	"Unloved"	Andy Goddard	Terry Cafolla	2 March 2009	6.24 million	"Born Bad" (16 November 1993)
3	3	"Vice"	Omar Madha	Chris Chibnall	9 March 2009	6.61 million	"Working Mom" (26 February 1997)
4	4	"Unsafe"	Andy Goddard	Chris Chibnall	16 March 2009	6.24 million	"American Dream" (9 November 1993)
5	5	"Buried"	Mark Everest	Catherine Tregenna	23 March 2009	6.69 million	"...In Memory of" (5 November 1991)
6	6	"Paradise"	Tristram Powell	Chris Chibnall	30 March 2009	5.87 million	"Heaven" (26 November 1991)
7	7	"Alesha"	Mark Everest	Catherine Tregenna	6 April 2009	6.02 million	"Helpless" (4 November 1992)

=== Series 2 (2010) ===
No. overall	No. in series	Title	Directed by	Written by	Original release date	UK viewers (millions)	Original Law & Order episode
8	1	"Samaritan"	Andy Goddard	Chris Chibnall	30 July 2009 (Canada); 11 January 2010 (UK)	6.51 million	"Manhood" (12 May 1993)
9	2	"Hidden"	Julian Holmes	Emilia di Girolamo	6 August 2009 (Canada); 18 January 2010 (UK)	6.53 million	"Bitter Fruit" (20 September 1995)
10	3	"Community Service"	Ken Grieve	Catherine Tregenna	13 August 2009 (Canada); 25 January 2010 (UK)	6.07 million	"Volunteers" (29 September 1993)
11	4	"Sacrifice"	Robert Del Maestro	Terry Cafolla, Nathan Cockerill	20 August 2009 (Canada); 1 February 2010 (UK)	6.06 million	"Sonata for a Solo Organ" (2 April 1991)
12	5	"Love and Loss"	Mark Everest	Terry Cafolla	27 August 2009 (Canada); 8 February 2010 (UK)	6.34 million	"Consultation" (9 December 1992)
13	6	"Honour Bound"	Andy Goddard	Chris Chibnall	3 September 2009 (Canada); 15 February 2010 (UK)	6.28 million	"Corruption" (30 October 1996)

=== Series 3 (2010) ===
No. overall	No. in series	Title	Directed by	Written by	Original release date	UK viewers (millions)	Original Law & Order episode
14	1	"Broken"	Andy Goddard	Emilia di Girolamo	9 September 2010	5.27 million	"Killerz" (29 September 1999)
15	2	"Hounded"	Julian Holmes	Catherine Tregenna	16 September 2010	4.42 million	"Mad Dog" (2 April 1997)
16	3	"Defence"	Mark Everest	Debbie O’Malley	23 September 2010	4.83 million	"Pro Se" (8 May 1996)
17	4	"Confession"	James Strong	Terry Cafolla	30 September 2010	3.75 million	"Bad Faith" (26 April 1995)
18	5	"Survivor"	Andy Goddard	Emilia di Girolamo	7 October 2010	4.82 million	"Punk" (25 November 1998)
19	6	"Masquerade"	Hettie MacDonald	Richard Stokes	14 October 2010	4.90 million	"Good Girl" (7 October 1996)
20	7	"Anonymous"	Mark Everest	Debbie O’Malley	21 October 2010	5.05 million	"Stalker" (15 April 1998)

=== Series 4 (2011) ===
No. overall	No. in series	Title	Directed by	Written by	Original release date	UK viewers (millions)	Original Law & Order episode
21	1	"Help"	James Strong	Terry Cafolla	2 December 2010 (Canada); 7 March 2011 (UK)	5.70 million	"We Like Mike" (30 April 1997)
22	2	"Denial"	Robert Del Maestro	Catherine Tregenna	11 November 2010 (Canada); 14 March 2011 (UK)	4.71 million	"DNR" (6 October 1999)
23	3	"ID"	Andy Goddard	Emilia Di Girolamo	4 November 2010 (Canada); 21 March 2011 (UK)	4.35 million	"Promises to Keep" (10 February 1993)
24	4	"Duty of Care"	Julian Holmes	Debbie O'Malley	25 November 2010 (Canada); 28 March 2011 (UK)	4.37 million	"Endurance" (18 October 2000)
25	5	"Shaken"	Paul Wilmshurst	Emila Di Girolamo	18 November 2010 (Canada); 4 April 2011 (UK)	4.69 million	"Homesick" (15 April 1996)
26	6	"Skeletons"	Andy Goddard	Catherine Tregenna	9 December 2010 (Canada); 11 April 2011 (UK)	4.71 million	"Trophy" (31 January 1996)

=== Series 5 (2011) ===
No. overall	No. in series	Title	Directed by	Written by	Original release date	UK viewers (millions)	Original Law & Order episode
27	1	"The Wrong Man"	Marisol Adler	Debbie O'Malley	10 July 2011	6.77 million	"Prescription for Death" (13 September 1990)
28	2	"Safe"	Julian Holmes	Emilia Di Girolamo	17 July 2011	5.43 million	"Angel" (29 November 1995)
29	3	"Crush"	Mat King	Nicholas Hicks-Beach	24 July 2011	5.31 million	"Humiliation" (22 November 1995)
30	4	"Tick Tock"	Mark Everest	Richard Stokes	31 July 2011	4.93 million	"Hot Pursuit" (8 November 1995)
31	5	"Intent"	Julian Holmes	Debbie O'Malley	7 August 2011	4.88 million	"Privileged" (5 April 1995)
32	6	"Deal"	Andy Goddard	Emilia Di Girolamo	14 August 2011	4.86 million	"Slave" (21 April 1996)

=== Series 6 (2012) ===
No. overall	No. in series	Title	Directed by	Written by	Original release date	UK viewers (millions)	Original Law & Order episode
33	1	"Survivor’s Guilt"	Andy Goddard	Emilia di Girolamo	28 September 2011 (US); 6 January 2012 (UK)	5.14 million	"Suicide Box" (23 March 2003)
34	2	"Immune"	James Strong	Nicholas Hicks-Beach	5 October 2011 (US); 13 January 2012 (UK)	5.24 million	"Double Down" (16 April 1997)
35	3	"Haunted"	Mat King	Suzie Smith	12 October 2011 (US); 20 January 2012 (UK)	5.32 million	"Ghosts" (5 October 2005)
36	4	"Trial"	David O'Neill	Nicholas Hicks-Beach	19 October 2011 (US); 27 January 2012 (UK)	5.07 million	"Double Blind" (6 November 1996)
37	5	"Line Up"	M.T. Adler	Emilia di Girolamo	26 October 2011 (US); 3 February 2012 (UK)	5.26 million	"Performance" (8 February 1995)
38	6	"Dawn Till Dusk"	Mark Everest	Richard Stokes	2 November 2011 (US); 10 February 2012 (UK)	5.15 million	"Mayhem" (9 March 1994)
39	7	"Fault Lines"	James Strong	Emilia di Girolamo	9 November 2011 (US); 17 February 2012 (UK)	5.09 million	"Just a Girl in the World" (2 October 2009)

=== Series 7 (2013) ===
No. overall	No. in series	Title	Directed by	Written by	Original release date	UK viewers (millions)	Original Law & Order episode
40	1	"Tracks"	Mat King	Emilia di Girolamo	14 July 2013	5.32 million	"Locomotion" (18 May 2005)
41	2	"Tremors"	Mat King	Emilia di Girolamo	21 July 2013	4.91 million	"Aftershock" (22 May 1996)
42	3	"Paternal"	Jill Robertson	Nicholas Hicks-Beach	28 July 2013	4.90 million	"Deadbeat" (13 November 1996)
43	4	"Fatherly Love"	Jill Robertson	Noel Farragher	4 August 2013	4.60 million	"Family Values" (12 October 1994)
44	5	"Mortal"	Joss Agnew	Nicholas Hicks-Beach	11 August 2013	4.67 million	"Golden Years" (5 January 1994)
45	6	"Dependent"	Joss Agnew	Jane Hudson	18 August 2013	4.56 million	"Phobia" (14 February 2001)

=== Series 8 (2014) ===
No. overall	No. in series	Title	Directed by	Written by	Original release date	UK viewers (millions)	Original Law & Order episode
46	1	"Flaw"	Mat King	Nicholas Hicks-Beach	12 March 2014	4.24 million	"Refuge, Part I" (26 May 1999)
47	2	"Safe from Harm"	Mat King	Tom Grieves	19 March 2014	3.88 million	"Betrayal" (5 March 2008)
48	3	"I Predict a Riot"	Mat King	Richard Stokes	26 March 2014	4.29 million	"Ramparts" (13 January 1999)
49	4	"Pride"	Mat King	Matt Evans	2 April 2014	4.29 million	"Identity" (5 November 2003)
50	5	"Customs"	Joss Agnew	Jamie Crichton	9 April 2014	4.42 million	"Ritual" (17 December 1997)
51	6	"Bad Romance"	Joss Agnew	Louise Ironside	16 April 2014	4.51 million	"Denial" (8 October 1997)
52	7	"Hard Stop"	Jill Robertson	Noel Farragher	23 April 2014	3.97 million	"Criminal Law" (23 November 2005)
53	8	"Repeat to Fade"	Jill Robertson	Richard Stokes	11 June 2014	3.83 million	"Marathon" (17 November 1999)

== Ratings ==
Law & Order: UK : UK viewers per episode (millions)
Audience measurement performed by Broadcasters' Audience Research Board
