= Law & Order: UK series 3 =

Law & Order: UK
- Series 3
- No. of episodes: 7

Release
- Original network: ITV
- Original release: 9 September – 21 October 2010

Series chronology
- ← Previous; Series 2 Next → Series 4

The third series of Law & Order: UK premiered on ITV on 9 September 2010 and concluded on 21 October 2010. It stars Bradley Walsh, Jamie Bamber, and Harriet Walter, as well as Freema Agyeman. It ran for 7 episodes.

== Cast ==
=== Main ===
==== Law ====
- Bradley Walsh as Senior Detective Sergeant Ronnie Brooks
- Jamie Bamber as Junior Detective Sergeant Matt Devlin
- Harriet Walter as Detective Inspector Natalie Chandler

==== Order ====
- Ben Daniels as Senior Crown Prosecutor James Steel
- Freema Agyeman as Junior Crown Prosecutor Alesha Phillips
- Bill Paterson as CPS Director George Castle

== Episodes ==
No. overall	No. in series	Title	Directed by	Written by	Original release date	UK viewers (millions)	Original Law & Order episode
14	1	"Broken"	Andy Goddard	Emilia di Girolamo	9 September 2010	5.27 million	"Killerz" (29 September 1999)
When six-year-old Connor Reid is found strangled to death in a dis-used council flat, suspicion falls onto a mystery man who thirteen-year-old Paige Ward (Annie Cull) and ten-year-old Rose Shaw (Romy Irving) claim to have seen. However, when CCTV footage shows Paige & Rose accompanying Connor into the flat, the pair open up and claim they had been babysitting Connor after his older brother, who was supposed to be babysitting, had left him alone. Eventually, Paige breaks down and names Rose as the killer. When the case gets to court, Rose's brief Kim Sharkey invites the court to accept Paige as the guilty party, as forensics seem to implicate her as the murderess. However, Alesha finds more evidence to confirm Rose as the killer. Connor's mother, however, claims she doesn't want Rose to be punished – and instead plead that due to her abusive upbringing, the courts have grounds to charge diminished responsibility, and seek psychiatric care for Rose. However Sharkey, after professional glory, wants an all-or-nothing verdict. James puts Rose's vile mother in the witness box to prove the prosecution point and battles to save Rose from a murder charge.
15	2	"Hounded"	Julian Holmes	Catherine Tregenna	16 September 2010	4.42 million	"Mad Dog" (2 April 1997)
Sixteen-year-old virgin Ashanti Walker is found murdered in her bed following sex, the MO matches a series of cases committed by serial rapist Paul Darnell. Conveniently, Darnell had been released from prison just three months earlier – and suspicion soon falls upon his part in the crime. However, with no signs of forced entry at her flat, Brooks & Devlin struggle to make the claim stick. Darnell's loyal girlfriend claims his innocence – and says that he is a reformed character. However, with no formal alibi, and CCTV footage of Darnell in the area at the time, Brooks & Devlin are convinced he is the murderer. They soon discover that Darnell would not have needed to force his way into her flat, as living in a similar building when he was younger, knew that downstairs, a tunnel linking two neighbouring properties would allow him entry without detection. And the fact that the lock on the neighbouring property's door was broken seems to suggest that the door was Darnell's point of entry. He is formally arrested, however, his barrister, Cassie Shaw (Neve McIntosh), attempts to get him off the charge by claiming persecution in interview. With little physical evidence and only psychiatric reports to rely on, Steel must convince the jury of Darnell's involvement.
16	3	"Defence"	Mark Everest	Debbie O’Malley	23 September 2010	4.83 million	"Pro Se" (8 May 1996)
An employee who works at a vintage clothes shop returns from lunch, and finds two workers and a customer dead. He quickly calls 999 and Devlin and Brooks investigate the victims, who were apparently killed with a sword or long knife. The medical evidence later indicates that the weapon was a bayonet. A fourth surviving victim soon points the detectives in the right direction – a man who was seen nearby just before the attack. He is eventually identified as John "Zero" Smith (Rupert Graves), an educated but homeless ex-military man, who is arrested with the weapon on him. Smith, who hasn't taken his medication for several months was previously charged with stalking a young woman but sloppy prosecution led to the case's collapse. It is also revealed that Smith is a law graduate, who has several law degrees. Smith has a long history of mental illness and occasional violent behavior but as long as he remains on his medication, he's practically a different person and there's a high degree of normality about him. He soon decides to defend himself at his trial. He proves to be a formidable opponent against Steel, and trying to avoid both hospitalization and jail, argues that he is not a danger to society so long as he is medicated and claims that he was not himself that day and therefore not the killer, while Steel attempts to prove that Smith is likely to stop taking his medications yet again. Steel brings in Smith's sister, Patricia (Amanda Root), and attempts to use Smith's paranoia to get his conviction. Signs of disociative identity disorder seem present throughout.
17	4	"Confession"	James Strong	Terry Cafolla	30 September 2010	3.75 million	"Bad Faith" (26 April 1995)
A gunshot is heard by two passers by in the park, and they quickly flag down some cops. Only to discover the dead person was a fellow Police Officer Pete Garvey, but the apparent murder quickly turns out to be a suicide. Matt Devlin takes it badly as he was childhood friends with Garvey as well as his first partner on uniform detail. Garvey's widow says that he had recently been plagued by nightmares and was seeing Jonathan Nugent (Matthew Marsh), a former priest and pillar of the community but in reality an undetected paedophile, who had molested Garvey and others when they were boys. It becomes apparent that Garvey was suffering from post traumatic stress disorder after being reminded of the sexual abuse he suffered at the hands of Nugent. The now-married Nugent and Devlin face off as CPS engages in a risky gambit and charges Nugent with manslaughter, for causing the PTSD, on the fact that Nugent's abuse so unbalanced Garvey that he killed himself as a result. The case becomes increasingly difficult, and Nugent claims that Garvey was blackmailing him, which tips the jury on his side. On top of that, Steel must now deal with the Catholic church, who wish to do a deal, and the press.
18	5	"Survivor"	Andy Goddard	Emilia di Girolamo	7 October 2010	4.82 million	"Punk" (25 November 1998)
Prisoner officer Charlie Tyner is found shot dead on a council estate in Hackey, suspicion falls on Ellis Bevan (Ceyln Jones), who was hounded by Tyner in prison for being a child molester. However, it is not long before Brooks & Devlin discover that Tyner was corrupt, and not only was he dealing heroin to the prisoners in his care, he was taking advantage of their situation and raping them as well. Suspicion falls on prisoner Tamika Vincent (Wunmi Mosaku), who became pregnant at the hands of Tyner during one of his sordid sexual adventures. They soon discover that Tyner's drug dealer was Jackson Marshall (Robbie Gee), a career criminal who has evaded the justice system for too long, and that Marshall also has a connection with Tamika – she is serving a sentence for being a mule for Marshall and smuggling drugs into the country for him. With two motives to kill – the fact that Tyner owed him money, and that he raped his mule Tamika – James and Alesha find themselves at odds with George, who is keen to bring justice to the murder of a prison officer. When it is discovered that Tamika ordered Marshall to kill Tyner after her months of abuse, the crown prosecution service believe they finally have the opportunity to bring Marshall to justice.
19	6	"Masquerade"	Hettie MacDonald	Richard Stokes	14 October 2010	4.90 million	"Good Girl" (7 October 1996)
A landlord finds one of his tenants doors open and a body on the floor he calls the police, who find university student, Archie Rahman, stabbed to death in his flat. The only clue to go on is a library book on Persian Pottery, taken out in the name of Becky Anderson (Charlene McKenna), which was found in Archie's flat. Brooks and Devlin question Becky, who tells them her friend Sally Douglas (Kimberley Nixon) swapped library cards with her. The girls give each other alibis, claiming they were studying in the library at the time the young man was killed. Becky later admits she was lying for Sally, and the officers soon focus on several inconsistencies in Sally's story, until she finally admits that Archie, who she did not know, lured her to his flat where he drugged and raped her. The police and CPS are skeptical but when the media get hold of the story, the whole case takes on racial overtones with the press clearly taking Sally's view of the case. It's left to Steel and Phillips to sort just what is the truth, as they learn that Archie was once suspended from school for sexual misconduct, but evidence also points to Sally having known Archie for some time, rather than being the casual pick-up she claims. Under the heavy influence of her racist father (Andrew Dunn), personality throws doubt on Sally's innocence.
20	7	"Anonymous"	Mark Everest	Debbie O’Malley	21 October 2010	5.05 million	"Stalker" (15 April 1998)
Medical nurse Stephanie Blake (Michelle Bonnard) is thrown down the stairs at her flat by a mystery assailant, evidence of a stalker named 'Giovanni' comes to light. It appears that for the past two years, the stalker has been sending Stephanie e-mails and telephone calls claiming to know every last detail about her. Lucas Dutton, a man whom she met a local bar, claims to know nothing about the stalking – but when he is revealed to be a bit of a dark horse, Brooks & Devlin suspect there is more to him than meets the eye. When Russell Lowry (Rocky Marshall), a conceited ladies man, is revealed to have contacted Stephanie through an animal charity that Stephanie worked for, suspicion falls on his involvement in the case. However, at the time the e-mails and phone calls started, Lowry was in prison for a GBH charge. When no physical evidence is found at the scene of Stephanie's fall, Brooks & Devlin suspect that Blake threw herself down the stars as a cry for help, as the police involved with her stalking claim failed to help her. In interview, Ronnie shows her a picture of Lowry and asks if he was the man who pushed her – and unable to remember, he believes she did throw herself down the stairs – but she claims that if she is not given help she will end up dead. Upon her release, she returns to her flat – but within hours is found dead, slashed across the neck. The only clue is a 999 phone call, made by Blake moments before her death, claiming 'it's him, it's him, the man from the photo', indicated that Lowry was her killer. Ronnie decides to review the evidence – and when the landlady of the building reveals she buzzed someone in around the time of Stephanie's fall, he believes that she was, in fact, pushed by Lowry as well. When the case comes to court, James comes up against Evelyn Wyndham (Anna Chancellor). However, Ronnie's review of the evidence comes under scrutiny from Matt – and in order to secure a conviction against Lowry, James must discredit Matt's view.
