= Law & Order: UK series 6 =

Law & Order: UK
- Series 6
- No. of episodes: 7

Release
- Original network: ITV
- Original release: 6 January – 17 February 2012

Series chronology
- ← Previous; Series 5 Next → Series 7

The sixth series of Law & Order: UK premiered on BBC America on 28 September 2011 and concluded on 9 November 2011. It ran for 7 episodes. In the UK, it was broadcast on ITV on 6 January 2012, concluding on 17 February 2012.

According to Screen Rant, the fan favorite episode during season 6 of Law & Order: UK was "Survivor's Guilt", based on IMDb ratings.

== Cast ==
=== Main ===
==== Law ====
- Bradley Walsh as Senior Detective Sergeant Ronnie Brooks
- Paul Nicholls as Junior Detective Sergeant Sam Casey
- Harriet Walter as Detective Inspector Natalie Chandler

==== Order ====
- Dominic Rowan as Senior Crown Prosecutor Jacob Thorne
- Freema Agyeman as Junior Crown Prosecutor Alesha Phillips
- Peter Davison as CPS Director Henry Sharpe

== Episodes ==
No. overall	No. in series	Title	Directed by	Written by	Original release date	UK viewers (millions)	Original Law & Order episode
33	1	"Survivor’s Guilt"	Andy Goddard	Emilia di Girolamo	28 September 2011 (US); 6 January 2012 (UK)	5.14 million	"Suicide Box" (23 March 2003)
DS Sam Casey is given the job of investigating Matt Devlin's death, but Ronnie, distraught about the loss of his best friend and partner, begins to let his emotions interfere with the investigation. Casey immediately suspects one of Mark Ellis' accomplices. Ellis, however, denies all involvement and the case leads to a teenager, Jamaal Clarkson, whose brother Kieran was murdered in 2003 after being shot in the head. The police covered up the case and signed it off as a suicide, but Jamaal and his family believe they had been subjected to institutional racism. Jamaal admits to Ronnie that he knew that Mark Ellis was Kieran's killer and that he went to the court to shoot Ellis, but was too late, and instead shot Matt as an act of revenge against the police. Jake and Alesha must find a way of prosecuting Jamaal for murder.
34	2	"Immune"	James Strong	Nicholas Hicks-Beach	5 October 2011 (US); 13 January 2012 (UK)	5.24 million	"Double Down" (16 April 1997)
An armed robbery at a fast food restaurant leads Ronnie and Sam to Frank Donovan, a convicted criminal who is believed to be the accomplice in the robbery. Donovan reveals that he and his former cellmate, Jamie Harper, robbed the joint after they ran into a gambling debt – and that after their getaway car broke down, in the midst of Harper shooting an innocent bystander, kidnapped an innocent man, Michael Coombs, and ordered him to drive them away. Coombs, a father of two who suffers from severe asthma, is nowhere to be found – and Donovan insists that for information on his whereabouts he must be given immunity against being prosecuted for the murder of the innocent bystander, and instead be tried for manslaughter. Jake and Alesha agree to the deal, however, Donovan's information leads to Coombs' corpse, and thus, they realize they have been duped, as Donovan would have known Coombs was already dead. In court, Jake attempts to overturn the immunity agreement, which comes up against some scrutiny from Donovan's brief, Miriam Pescatore (Tamzin Outhwaite). However, the case soon swings in his favour when Donovan's accomplice Jamie Harper is found dead and buried in the woodlands. Jake agrees to let the immunity agreement stand, but thus, pleads that separate to the charge of manslaughter, Donovan should be tried for Harper's death as it were a separate incident.
35	3	"Haunted"	Mat King	Suzie Smith	12 October 2011 (US); 20 January 2012 (UK)	5.32 million	"Ghosts" (5 October 2005)
Ronnie and Sam are called to visit dying criminal Jimmy O'Docherty after he is hit by a car after committing a theft. On his deathbed, he confesses to the murder of Amanda Bennett, a case Ronnie investigated and put to bed over 14 years ago. At the time, Ronnie was convinced that Amanda's father, Simon, had committed the murder after her blood was found on his clothes, and his saliva found on her hand. The investigation leads to Docherty's best friend Ricky Phelps, and after some investigation, Ronnie and Sam believe they have found the right man after three witnesses admit to Ricky claiming he killed Amanda. New DNA evidence also puts Ricky in the frame – but when the case gets to court, Ronnie's motives for tracking Ricky down come under scrutiny when the defence highlight he was an alcoholic during the original investigation. The case is further hindered when Ronnie confesses that his colleague at the time, Bernard Rawlins, was regularly known to be overdosing on prescription drugs.
36	4	"Trial"	David O'Neill	Nicholas Hicks-Beach	19 October 2011 (US); 27 January 2012 (UK)	5.07 million	"Double Blind" (6 November 1996)
A retired janitor is killed by a letter bomb, Ronnie and Sam suspect that he may have been killed because he was Jewish. The trace leads to a criminal who was responsible for several similar killings in the '70s, who informs the police that the bomb may have been constructed using an anarchists' guide. As they investigate the janitor's previous place of work, Thameside University, they discover he was fired after false allegations that he was stealing drugs from the Psych lab. They discover that a student who works in the university's postroom, Simon Wells, had recently inquired to other students on how to construct a weapon using mercury – however, after he is arrested, his brief pleads diminished responsibility due to insanity. Jake and Alesha discover that Wells killed the janitor after he found out that he was stealing drugs and blackmailed him. Wells revealed he decided to create the bomb after a mental condition he had been suffering for sometime returned. Before they prosecute Wells, however, they discover that his doctor, a well respected Marylebone physician, may be responsible for his condition after he failed to continue the correct course of treatment, in favour of money from a drugs company. After it is discovered that Simon is not insane and, in fact, suffers from a brain tumour, his doctor is put in the dock for manslaughter.
37	5	"Line Up"	M.T. Adler	Emilia di Girolamo	26 October 2011 (US); 3 February 2012 (UK)	5.26 million	"Performance" (8 February 1995)
Ronnie and Sam become concerned when they are alerted to a video of a teenage girl being raped and shot which has been circulating virally for three weeks. They discover that the victim, Anna Rousso, believed that she was going to a party to hang out with some of her friends, but on arrival, found three boys waiting to have sex with her. They discover that Anna's crush, Danny, was a witness to the incident and made a 999 call from a nearby phonebox. They are soon able to link the rape to three local youths using Danny's evidence, DNA and the video footage. However, when the case reaches court, the youths' brief (Eva Pope) manages to get the video footage excluded, leaving Alesha with no ground to fall back on. However, during a conversation with Danny, she lets slip that all she would need is a guilty plea to convict all three defendants – and when in the witness box, Danny makes a life-changing decision which could throw the decision in Alesha's favour.
38	6	"Dawn Till Dusk"	Mark Everest	Richard Stokes	2 November 2011 (US); 10 February 2012 (UK)	5.15 million	"Mayhem" (9 March 1994)
Ronnie and Sam are called out to the scene of a man found dead in his car. They immediately discover that he was not alone, and soon manage to track down his female friend. While on the search for a "Harry Hill" lookalike who was seen at the scene of the crime, they are distracted when they are called to the scene of a man who has hit his brother over the head during a violent row, after his brother attacked him. As they interview a suspect in the case of the dead man, they discover that the suspect in question, Roland Hextor, had apparently been spotted following one of the man's female colleagues just weeks earlier. To make matters worse, in interview, he refuses to provide any information as to where he was on the night in question. Just as they are about to charge Hextor, they discover the weapon used to kill the victim does not match a weapon found in Hextor's possession, leaving their case with no leads. With hours of CCTV to trawl through, the detectives soon become worklogged when the case of the man who fought with his brother turns into a murder charge. With two cases to deal with, a further spanner is thrown into the works when a defendant on trial accuses Sam of intimidating him during interview.
39	7	"Fault Lines"	James Strong	Emilia di Girolamo	9 November 2011 (US); 17 February 2012 (UK)	5.09 million	"Just a Girl in the World" (2 October 2009)
Ronnie and Sam investigate when crime scene examiner Kelly Mahon is found stabbed to death in her flat. All the lines of inquiry begin to lead to a dead end, until her colleague, Lucy Kennard, makes a claim that she was attacked outside her flat by an angered cabbie. The cabbie is soon found to have a connection to Kelly, and after forensic evidence places Kelly's blood on his trainers, Ronnie believes they have the right man. However, as things seem to appear cut and dried, Sam finds himself entangled in a sexual relationship with Lucy. Whilst investigating the contents of Kelly's stolen handbag, they discover that at the time of the stabbing, she was in possession of an Ann Summers gift card worth £100. Sam soon discovers that the card had been activated once in the last month to buy a size 10 red nightie, however, no trace of a nightie is found at Kelly's flat. As their relationship grows deeper, Sam is startled and horrified to discover the nightie in Lucy's bathroom. Jake and Alesha soon discover that Lucy may well have been Kelly's killer – and that the forensic evidence found on the cabbie may have been placed there by Kelly's friends to deliberately implicate him. And as a string of men who have had money extorted from them by Lucy come to light, Jake and Alesha believe they have enough evidence to prosecute. However, with Sam's sexual involvement hanging over their shoulders, the case threatens to collapse after Lucy accuses the judge of the trial of bribing her with release in return for sexual activities.
