= Law & Order: UK series 7 =

Law & Order: UK
- Series 7
- No. of episodes: 6

Release
- Original network: ITV
- Original release: 14 July – 18 August 2013

Series chronology
- ← Previous; Series 6 Next → Series 8

In August 2012, the UK television network ITV announced that the series Law & Order: UK would return with a six-episode seventh series with production to begin in November. It was also announced that cast members Freema Agyeman and Harriet Walter would not be returning. Georgia Taylor and Paterson Joseph join the cast in this series. The series began airing on 14 July 2013, eighteen months since the airing of Series 6.

== Cast ==
=== Main ===
==== Law ====
- Bradley Walsh as Senior Detective Sergeant Ronnie Brooks
- Paul Nicholls as Junior Detective Sergeant Sam Casey
- Paterson Joseph as Detective Inspector Wes Leyton

==== Order ====
- Dominic Rowan as Senior Crown Prosecutor Jacob Thorne
- Georgia Taylor as Junior Crown Prosecutor Kate Barker
- Peter Davison as CPS Director Henry Sharpe

== Episodes ==
No. overall	No. in series	Title	Directed by	Written by	Original release date	UK viewers (millions)	Original Law & Order episode
40	1	"Tracks"	Mat King	Emilia di Girolamo	14 July 2013	5.32 million	"Locomotion" (18 May 2005)
A car is left on a railway level crossing causing a catastrophic train crash which kills fifteen people, though the car driver cannot be found. DS Sam Casey struggles to cope after failing to save a young boy at the scene of the incident. This forces DS Ronnie Brooks and the recently promoted Wes Leyton, who is an old colleague of Ronnies and who is covering for DI Natalie Chandler, to keep a close eye on him. Initially the police suspect the car owner, the unpleasant Michael Gennis (Adam James), but learn that the car was stolen and the actual driver, Finn Tyler (Aidan McArdle), intended to kill himself by driving onto the track but changed his mind at the last minute. Jake Thorne is anxious to prosecute him for murder but Tyler's defence barrister, Kate Barker, puts up a case of diminished responsibility by reason of suicidal intention. At trial Kate shows Tylers vulnerability and mental illness to the court and the jury agrees. Tyler is found not guilty of murder but guilty of manslaughter by reason of diminished responsibility. Meanwhile Jake's boss, CPS Director Henry Sharpe, springs one more surprise on the Chief Prosecutor, Kate as his junior assistant. But before Jake has time to protest, Kate excuses herself to check on Tyler. However down in the holding cells, Tyler is found dead and suspicion falls on his last known visitor, DS Sam Casey.
41	2	"Tremors"	Mat King	Emilia di Girolamo	21 July 2013	4.91 million	"Aftershock" (22 May 1996)
Continuing on from the last episode where it was shown that he was the last person to apparently have seen Finn Tyler alive, DS Sam Casey is suspended from duty pending a full investigation. Convinced of Sam's innocence Ronnie does some sleuthing of his own, with DI Wes Leyton getting hands on with the investigation. Discovering that CCTV footage of Tyler in his cell has gone missing, this in turn leads him to discover a pact made by the bereaved relatives of the train victims and to the real killer. Meanwhile, For the first time we explore a day-in-the-life of the Law & Order: UK regulars. Jake and Kate argue over the morality of prosecuting a mentally ill man like Tyler and indeed over most things but declare a truce over a broken coffee machine and after a few drinks Jake opens up to new colleague about his mother's death. Whilst Ronnie catches up with estranged daughter Emma (Alexandra Guelff). And during his suspension Sam spends the day with his son Ben (Joe Reynolds), to his ex-wife's (Ebony Gilbert) disapproval. All giving new insight into our heroes' off-duty lives.
42	3	"Paternal"	Jill Robertson	Nicholas Hicks-Beach	28 July 2013	4.90 million	"Deadbeat" (13 November 1996)
Michael Trent is found shot dead in his hotel room and the money he had with him is missing. Not only was he dealing with the dangerous Kopecky brothers (Branko Tomovic and Christopher Sciueref) but had told his girlfriend Becky Bryson (Gemma Atkinson) that he was an under-cover policeman, when he was actually car salesman Gary Tully. The police learn that, despite his hidden wealth, he owed thousands of pounds in child maintenance to Lindsey Donovan (Jo Hartley), the mother of his son Joe (Max Furst), who has leukemia and was evasive about being tested for a bone marrow match. Suspicion falls on Tully's ex-father-in-law and Lindsay's father Philip Donovan (Ian Bleasdale), who had been hiding some of the stolen money and he is charged with murder but his lawyer Eleanor Flint (Amanda Mealing) pleads self-defence when Philip claims that Tully pulled a gun on him. However a police interview with an associate of Philip suggests that both he and Lindsay had plotted to kill the victim. Kate is sympathetic over the family situation but Jake simply wants a conviction.
43	4	"Fatherly Love"	Jill Robertson	Noel Farragher	4 August 2013	4.60 million	"Family Values" (12 October 1994)
Property developer Charlotte Leigh's car is found, on Albert Bridge, by two young men who get in and try to start it only to end up getting arrested by the police when the wannabe car thief's story doesn't fly with them. Suspicious as to why the car was parked there in the first place, the police call in Ronnie and Sam who suspect Charlotte is now dead in the River Thames. After starting a missing persons investigation, a body is later found near the spot where her car was found, and identified as being Charlotte, suicide being ruled out by the forensic pathologist. At first her ex-husband, Richard McGrath (Patrick Baladi), is suspected after the police are told that he is in a custody battle over his and Charlotte's young teenage daughter, Holly (Charlotte Hope). But after his alibi rules him out the team look a little closer to home when traces of Charlotte's blood are found at her own home, a flat that she shared with Holly and her new man Sean Harte (Rory Keenan). After interviewing him and Holly they both claim the other was pestering them sexually. Sean has an alibi, and confesses that Holly told him she murdered Charlotte in a jealous rage over him. She is arrested and stands trial for the murder of her own mother, however Ronnie discovers that Sean was also involved with Jess (Jodie Comer), a school-friend of Holly, which swings the case away from the accused.
44	5	"Mortal"	Joss Agnew	Nicholas Hicks-Beach	11 August 2013	4.67 million	"Golden Years" (5 January 1994)
Following a break-in, a frail, elderly woman is found dead in her flat. Ronnie and Sam initially suspect a burglary gone wrong and however, following a tip-off from the victim's grand-daughter Connie, the detectives' attention turns to live-in carer Cecile, who has disappeared having stolen a clock, the police find Cecile with the clock and she is promptly arrested. But Cecile claims the clock was a present and accuses Connie of firing her because she would not obey her instructions and starve Jenny to death. She backs up her claim with written instructions and the detectives discover that Connie, a potential bankrupt, has inherited Jenny's flat and she is charged with murder. Her lawyer Vijay Prasad submits that the accusation is vague and that Connie could easily have smothered her grandma if she wanted. Then Connie gives evidence, stating that her grandmother was in great pain and killed herself for the release. Chief Prosecutor Jake Thorne has the bit between his teeth when he tells the jury Connie was the only real family the victim had, and she left her to die. When Connie tells her side of the story she is very convincing and it seems likely that Jake will fail to secure a guilty verdict.
45	6	"Dependent"	Joss Agnew	Jane Hudson	18 August 2013	4.56 million	"Phobia" (14 February 2001)
A gay man called Richard Peters is found bludgeoned to death outside his flat and Leo, the baby he adopted with his partner Gareth Wilks is missing. Ronnie and Sam try to find the person who murdered Richard and took his adoptive son. Ruth Pendle, Leo's biological mother and a former drug addict, is seen on CCTV leaving the murder scene with a man who proves to be Neil Jenkins, the baby's real father. Jenkins admits to pushing Richard though he and Ruth both deny murder and the police charge them jointly. They have separate barristers, each accusing the other, but Kate believes Ruth should not be prosecuted and gets into trouble with Jake for colluding with Ruth's barrister Lydia Smythson by providing information to help her. Ronnie discovers that Kate's bias is due to her missing sister Beth's situation, similar to Ruth's. Ultimately Kate lets her head rule her heart in identifying the real killer, after which Ronnie has good news for her regarding her sister.

^{1} Ratings do not include ITV HD.
