= Law & Order: UK series 2 =

Law & Order: UK
- Series 2
- No. of episodes: 6

Release
- Original network: ITV
- Original release: 11 January – 15 February 2010

Series chronology
- ← Previous; Series 1 Next → Series 3

The second series of Law & Order: UK premiered on ITV on 11 January 2010 and concluded on 15 February 2010.

In January 2010, The Sunday Telegraph said that the show's "second season, which begins...with a PC killed at Waterloo Station, grips from the outset."

== Cast ==
=== Main ===
==== Law ====
- Bradley Walsh as Senior Detective Sergeant Ronnie Brooks
- Jamie Bamber as Junior Detective Sergeant Matt Devlin
- Harriet Walter as Detective Inspector Natalie Chandler

==== Order ====
- Ben Daniels as Senior Crown Prosecutor James Steel
- Freema Agyeman as Junior Crown Prosecutor Alesha Phillips
- Bill Paterson as CPS Director George Castle

== Episodes ==
No. overall	No. in series	Title	Directed by	Written by	Original release date	UK viewers (millions)	Original Law & Order episode
8	1	"Samaritan"	Andy Goddard	Chris Chibnall	30 July 2009 (Canada); 11 January 2010 (UK)	6.51 million	"Manhood" (12 May 1993)
After young police constable Nick Bentley (Ashley Rolfe) gets caught in a war between two drug dealers he is shot and killed in the crossfire. His partner, PC Ray Griffin (Jamie Foreman), says Nick shouldn't have been on his own but they got separated while on foot patrol. Brooks and Devlin think it's a tragic but pretty straightforward case and eventually locate a witness who identifies one of the parties to the drug transaction. They soon catch drug dealer Theo Carson (Ashley Chin). Carson shocks them and their boss, DI Natalie Chandler, when he tells them he saw another police constable standing in the shadows while the injured policeman was calling for help. Brooks and Devlin find an anomaly in Griffin's formal statement and things get tense within the police force when they start questioning fellow police officers. Brooks and Devlin discover that Nick was gay and that Bentley's fellow constables had recently learned of his sexual orientation, also that Griffin is the head of a radical Christian group with homophobic tendencies. At the CPS, James Steel and Alesha Phillips think they can prove Griffin was duty-bound to help his dying partner. But their boss, George Castle, doesn't agree. He doesn't want to upset the working relationship they have with the police and thinks the force won't be with them. James and Alesha don't want to let Griffin off the hook, though and argue that Griffin had a duty of care and was obliged to help his dying partner.
9	2	"Hidden"	Julian Holmes	Emilia di Girolamo	6 August 2009 (Canada); 18 January 2010 (UK)	6.53 million	"Bitter Fruit" (20 September 1995)
When ten-year-old Jodie Gaines is found dead in a disused builder's skip, Brooks and Devlin investigate the cab driver who regularly takes Jodie to music lessons. He claims to have dropped Jodie directly outside her teacher's house – but the teacher claims she never arrived. Brooks and Devlin realise one of them is lying – and upon re-interviewing each witness, discover that the taxi driver did not take her all the way to the teacher's house due to roadworks blocking the route. The pair then look at the CCTV footage from the surrounding area. This corroborates the taxi driver's story, and also throws a new light on the investigation when a white builder's van is seen to be following Jodie. Brooks and Devlin suspect that Nick Carlton (Philip Wright), an ex-con working for a seemly harmless construction company, was in fact the man who kidnapped Jodie – and forensic evidence ties him to her kidnap. When the case reaches court, the accused is surprisingly allowed bail – but is attacked and murdered by Jodie's mother Kayleigh (Anna Madeley), a recovering drug addict who lost contact with the girl following a custody battle. Crown prosecutor James Steel seeks a murder conviction, even though he knows that Kayleigh will be likely to have the sympathy of the court. It appears that Kayleigh will be released – but Devlin and Brooks uncover a crucial piece of information: Kayleigh had hired Carlton to kidnap Jodie in a scheme to get cash from tabloids for the story. Nick realized that Jodie was sick and wanted to back out. The prosecution claims that Kayleigh killed him to ensure he did not tell the police of their plan.
10	3	"Community Service"	Ken Grieve	Catherine Tregenna	13 August 2009 (Canada); 25 January 2010 (UK)	6.07 million	"Volunteers" (29 September 1993)
A homeless man with bipolar disorder, Roland Kirk (Sean Harris), is discovered severely beaten in a well-cared-for residential square of an East London estate, the police are called in for an attempted murder case. Kirk had unofficially moved into the community, and had been living out of a camper van in the square for some time, mainly causing trouble with his homeless friends. The law becomes a minefield for detectives Brooks and Devlin as they discover their list of suspects is long. Kirk was not really welcome on the estate, his presence taunting the residents who made countless complaints to the police, only to see him return once the police move him away. When the investigation reveals that the CCTV cameras had been turned away, indicating that the attack may have been planned, many in the neighbourhood refuse to cooperate, and none are willing to give up the person who did what so many of them wanted to do. Suspicion falls onto Joe Butler (Will Thorp), a seemingly harmless guy whose girlfriend the homeless man had been stalking. When Kirk regains consciousness, he claims that he has no recollection of who attacked him – except that remembered seeing a dragon before he fell unconscious. It is soon discovered that the 'dragon' is in fact a pattern on the dressing gown of Butler – and he is brought in and charged. However, he reveals there was more than one man there that night and Joe tells them it was hapless father Harry Morgan (Kevin McNally) who is soon charged with Kirk's assault. Steel believes he has a secure case with several motives – including the Kirk assaulting and breaking Morgan's wife Irene's arm, and Kirk converting Morgan's son Nate (Jonathan Readwin) into his way of life. When the case reaches court, however, Morgan claims he acted in self-defence.
11	4	"Sacrifice"	Robert Del Maestro	Terry Cafolla, Nathan Cockerill	20 August 2009 (Canada); 1 February 2010 (UK)	6.06 million	"Sonata for a Solo Organ" (2 April 1991)
A well-known local drug dealer and pimp, Darren McKenzie, is found lying on the ground in a park with what appears to be a missing kidney, Brooks and Devlin realize they must uncover exactly what happened to the man before the attacker strikes again. Their case soon leads to Joanna Woodleigh, a seemingly normal NHS patient who has recently undergone a successful kidney transplant, after two failed previous attempts. When they discover the kidney placed into Joanna belonged to McKenzie, they discover that somebody illegally sneaked the kidney into the hospital, and used it in the otherwise legal operation. When Joanna's father, Phillip (Denis Lawson) revealed he paid Joanna's doctor, John Reberty, £2,000,000 to find Joanna a suitable kidney in any way possible, Brooks and Devlin believe that the doctor, with the help of nurse Martha Kemble (Victoria Carling), took the kidney from McKenzie as it was the only suitable match. Steel soon struggles as to which one he should put in the dock – but is surprised to discover that George will be defending the case.
12	5	"Love and Loss"	Mark Everest	Terry Cafolla	27 August 2009 (Canada); 8 February 2010 (UK)	6.34 million	"Consultation" (9 December 1992)
Teenager Debbie Powell collapses and dies upon return from a holiday in Thailand, Brooks and Devlin suspect that foul play has occurred when a ruptured condom, containing heroin, is found in her system. It is revealed she had more than seventy condoms in her stomach, worth a street value of £250,000. The trail of suspects soon leads to Gerry Craig (Doug Allen), a known drug-dealer who had regular contact with Debbie. He, however, leads Brooks and Devlin to believe that Debbie had a secret boyfriend – and that he was the one who had a contact in Thailand, and had arranged for Debbie to smuggle the drugs into the country. When her secret boyfriend is discovered to be family friend Jack Gilmore (Shaun Dooley), Brooks and Devlin discover Debbie was one in a long line of mules whom Gilmore had sent on holiday to smuggle drugs for him. When the case comes to court, Steel faces a tough decision over securing a prosecution, after star witness Craig decides to change his story in the witness box.
13	6	"Honour Bound"	Andy Goddard	Chris Chibnall	3 September 2009 (Canada); 15 February 2010 (UK)	6.28 million	"Corruption" (30 October 1996)
An operation involving a police informant and a consignment of drugs goes wrong, resulting in the shooting of an informant, Shahid Nafoor (Pano Masti), DS Jimmy Valentine (Robert Glenister) comes under suspicion. He claims that Nafoor pulled the gun on him, and that in a struggle to disarm him, the gun fired. Brooks, who was part of the operation with Valentine, seems sure that his old friend is telling the truth, and has no questions regarding what happened. However, Devlin, who was watching from the background, doesn't seem so sure that Nafoor made the first move. Valentine is investigated, and it soon becomes apparent that Nafoor was a drugs runner for Clyde Mason, whom Valentine had a secret deal with. Devlin discovers that Mason had ordered Valentine to shoot Nafoor, after he discovered that Nafoor had been giving the police information on him. He also discovers that Valentine's relationship with Mason began several years ago, after Mason offered Valentine a sum of money to get him off a drugs possession charge. Valentine did so by arranging someone to remove evidence from the evidence store, meaning Mason would walk free on a technicality. When the case gets to court, however, things become awry. Valentine twists his story, claiming that Brooks was only part of the operation for a specific reason – that he was the person who stole the drugs from the evidence store.
