= Law & Order: UK series 1 =

Law & Order: UK
- Series 1
- Series 1 DVD cover
- No. of episodes: 7

Release
- Original network: ITV
- Original release: 23 February – 6 April 2009

Series chronology
- Next → Series 2

The first series of Law & Order: UK premiered on ITV on 23 February 2009 and concluded on 6 April 2009.

In September 2010, BBC America announced that it would import and broadcast Law & Order: UK in the United States starting on 3 October 2010.

== Cast ==
=== Main ===
==== Law ====
- Bradley Walsh as Senior Detective Sergeant Ronnie Brooks
- Jamie Bamber as Junior Detective Sergeant Matt Devlin
- Harriet Walter as Detective Inspector Natalie Chandler

==== Order ====
- Ben Daniels as Senior Crown Prosecutor James Steel
- Freema Agyeman as Junior Crown Prosecutor Alesha Phillips
- Bill Paterson as CPS Director George Castle

== Episodes ==
| No. overall | No. in series | Title | Directed by | Written by | Original release date | UK viewers (millions) | Original Law & Order episode |
|---|---|---|---|---|---|---|---|
| 1 | 1 | "Care" | Omar Madha | Chris Chibnall | 23 February 2009 | 6.96 million | "Cradle to Grave" (31 March 1992) |
DS Ronnie Brooks and DS Matt Devlin are assigned to investigate the death of a dead nine-month-old child who was found inside the sports bag in the parking lot of the hospital. The first obvious suspect is child's mother, Dionne Farrah (Venetia Campbell), but they learn that she had left the child at home by himself pending the arrival of the babysitter as she was concerned that she would be fired if she was late to work. The sitter was refused entry to the building and the boy was poisoned by carbon monoxide poisoning due to a faulty central heating system from the gas heater in his flat. A fellow tenant, Mike Turner (Tony Maudsley), had been bribed by the landlady, Maureen Walters (Lorraine Ashbourne), to harass the occupants into leaving so that she can renovate the building for more profitable developers as means for getting higher rent and he is charged with tampering with the heater as means of getting rid of tenants who refused to vacate their homes, and in the process killed the child. However, the case is declared a mistrial when it is claimed that the testimony of the building's French caretaker was wrongly translated. However, the trial gets back on track when the team finds that Mrs. Walters has also been bribing environmental health officers, and Steel persuades Turner to testify against her. Steel tries to prosecute Walters for gross negligence and corruption of public officials. First appearances of Ronnie Brooks, Matt Devlin, Natalie Chandler, James Steel, Alesha Phillips and George Castle.
| 2 | 2 | "Unloved" | Andy Goddard | Terry Cafolla | 2 March 2009 | 6.24 million | "Born Bad" (16 November 1993) |
When a 13-year-old boy is found kicked to death at Euston Station, first the detectives have to identify him. Their initial assumption is that he is a runaway but the autopsy reveals that he was well fed and in good health. DI Chandler holds a press conference which leads to identifying the victim as Danny Jackson who was in foster care as his mother, Mandy (Nicola Stephenson) is a former drug addict and currently in a rehab facility. She recently left her live-in boyfriend, Stevie Agnew (Neal Barry), who is already suspected of physical abuse towards the victim but he denies ever touching the child and claims not to have seen him since he left his mother. Brooks and Devlin become emotionally affected by the case which seems to involve child abuse and gang violence. The trail leads to the arrest of another young boy, Jono Blake (Richard Wisker), who was also in care at the same house as Danny. Steel and Phillips face an "old flame" from Steel's past in defence barrister Beatrice McArdle (Dervla Kirwan), who attempts a bizarre and audacious line of defence of genetic predisposition towards violence: the suggestion that genes could be responsible for aggressive behaviour. This could upset the whole British legal system since other defendants could claim that genes means that they are not responsible for their actions.
| 3 | 3 | "Vice" | Omar Madha | Chris Chibnall | 9 March 2009 | 6.61 million | "Working Mom" (26 February 1997) |
When the body of ex-vice squad officer, Frank McCallum, is found in the rear seat of his own car in Paddington, it is discovered that he was apparently killed after oral sex. They trace his movements to a young prostitute who has McCallum's wallet in her purse, but forensics eliminates her as a suspect. Though married to an adoring wife Frank had a roving eye and according to the victim's boss (Sean Pertwee), money from the paintballing firm for which he worked is unaccounted for. As they look into their ex-colleague's background, Brooks and Devlin trace McCallum's company credit card to a children's clothing store in Barnes run by two friends, Emma Sandbrook (Juliet Aubrey) and Kate Barton (Deborah Cornelius), only to discover that it is a front for an escort girl service and the two women are moonlighting as high-class prostitutes to pay for their sons' school fees. They charge the women with murder and determine a motive for one of them to have killed the man. Emma's unique and expensive lipstick is identified amongst the forensic evidence in the back of the car. Her "formidable defence barrister", Phyllis Gladstone (Lesley Manville), argues that McCallum was blackmailing Emma for free sex and attacked her when she tried to get out of the car. He subsequently tried to force her to have sex and she killed him in self-defense. Steel and Alesha are not convinced and prepare to do battle with Gladstone.
| 4 | 4 | "Unsafe" | Andy Goddard | Chris Chibnall | 16 March 2009 | 6.24 million | "American Dream" (9 November 1993) |
When a treasure hunter with a metal detector uncovers a nine-year-old skeleton in a shallow grave aside the Thames mudflats, it forces Brooks and Devlin to reopen a contentious murder case when they identify the remains as those of David Ackroyd who disappeared in 1999. His supposed killer and business partner, Luke Slade (Iain Glen), was eventually convicted of murder although no corpse was found and an unreliable witness claimed that Slade told him he had slit his victim's throat but the medical examiner finds that he was shot in the head. As a result, it would appear that Slade is the victim of a miscarriage of justice. Steel, however, is far from convinced and, when Slade represents himself in court, it becomes less about the trial and more about the vendetta between the two men. Slade soon files a writ to have his conviction overturned and the Crown prosecutors learn that Slade will represent himself at the appeal. Whilst in jail Slade has become skilled in the law and wins himself a re-trial, putting James Steel's career on the line in the process as was the original trial prosecutor as this was his first case with the Crown Prosecution Service. Steel and the police have to build an entirely new case against him and Steel soon finds himself before his own hearing alleging misconduct in his pursuit of Slade but fortunately for Steel, a visit to Slade's old cell-mate yields results.: Original episode and this adaptation inspired by the Billionaire Boys Club case.
| 5 | 5 | "Buried" | Mark Everest | Catherine Tregenna | 23 March 2009 | 6.69 million | "...In Memory of" (5 November 1991) |
When remains of a small boy are uncovered in a wall by a construction crew, the Police are called in. The remains are later identified as Thomas "Tommy" Keegan, who disappeared in 1983 at the age of eight, so his body was found 25 years after he was reported missing. The boy had his skull crushed with a blunt object and his body was bricked into a wall. Brooks and Devlin meet with the retired policeman in charge of the original investigation and he was convinced that he knew the culprit, Edward Connor (Anthony Higgins) a neighbour and a suspected paedophile, who was arrested but the police couldn't get - or beat - a confession out of him so he was released for lack of evidence. They also meet Julia Mortimer (Holly Aird), a childhood friend of Tommy, who used to play with him when they were younger. She tells the police that she had seen Tommy the day before he died but they notice an anomaly in her statement and ask her to undergo EMDR therapy, also known as regression hypnosis, to see if they can retrieve any additional memories as they believe that is subconsciously suppressing her memories of the events of the time. Julia names her estranged father Vernon (Keith Barron) not only as the killer but as a paedophile himself who molested her too. This leads to a history of sexual abuse and abuse of trust and it's left up to Steel to get the man to admit it on the witness stand but the court trial leads to angry exchanges between Julia and her father. However, Steel soon finds that his whole case rests on a very upset and potentially unreliable witness.: Original episode and this adaptation inspired by the George Franklin case.
| 6 | 6 | "Paradise" | Tristram Powell | Chris Chibnall | 30 March 2009 | 5.87 million | "Heaven" (26 November 1991) |
When an arson attack on a Turkish club claims kills 17 people, all undocumented illegal immigrants, Brooks and Devlin are under pressure to discover just who was behind it. Using CCTV, they manage to trace a suspect to a nearby hospital and what was first thought of as a racist attack soon turns out to be a lot more complicated. The perpetrator, Nazim Kazaba (Nabil Elouahabi), is caught as part of the device he used went off in the blast and something embedded in his leg but is refusing treatment, the situation is not helped when a suspect's human rights gets in the way of obtaining the crucial evidence. Steel's attempt to force the man to undergo treatment is unsuccessful so the police just wait for the wound to fester and, with evidence finally in hand, charge him with murder. The defendant decides to cut a deal and his information leads them to Ediz Kilic (Ken Bones), one of the most prominent members of London's Turkish community who is also a people smuggler who Kazaba claims forced him to silence the clubbers, who were ready to expose his activities. The prosecutors struggle to build a case as a conflict emerges between justice, community relations and racial harmony. Steel jeopardises his friendship with a Turkish school mate, who resents being under suspicion, from his student days to get information to bring Kilic down.: Original episode and this adaptation inspired by the Happy Land fire caused by Julio Gonzalez.
| 7 | 7 | "Alesha" | Mark Everest | Catherine Tregenna | 6 April 2009 | 6.02 million | "Helpless" (4 November 1992) |
When Phillips' gynaecologist, Dr. Alec Merrick (Derek Riddell), touches her inappropriately during a routine medical examination, she files a complaint with the police and accuses the respected doctor of sexual assault. Brooks, Devlin and Chandler struggle to find any firm evidence to investigate and the team becomes divided, but can't seem to find any former patients who may have made similar claims. They do however find that he did sleep with some patients, even if they won't accuse him of misconduct, making the conflicting reports from previous clients impossible to make an arrest. After learning that they have insufficient evidence to proceed, Phillips then resorts to desperate means to obtain justice only to make things worse for herself. Returning for a follow-up exam, Merrick drugs and rapes her, which she records on a spy camera. Steel is pitted against formidable defence barrister Phyllis Gladstone (Lesley Manville), who at trial claims entrapment. When Merrick also claims that the sex was consensual and the apparent rape was in fact role-playing as agreed to by both of them, Steel comes under pressure to secure a conviction.
