= Law & Order: UK series 8 =

Law & Order: UK
- Series 8
- No. of episodes: 8

Release
- Original network: ITV
- Original release: 12 March – 11 June 2014

Series chronology
- ← Previous; Series 7

On 28 June 2013, Bradley Walsh stated on This Morning that Law & Order: UK would return with an eighth series, commissioned to start filming in October 2013. In September 2013, broadcaster ITV confirmed that Law & Order: UK would return in 2014 with an eight episode series, and that Ben Bailey Smith had been cast as DS Joe Hawkins, replacing Paul Nicholls as DS Sam Casey.

This was the last series of Law & Order: UK to air, with broadcaster ITV and producer Kudos issuing a joint press release, on 3 June 2014, announcing that it would be "the last to be transmitted for the foreseeable future".

== Cast ==
=== Main ===
==== Law ====
- Bradley Walsh as Senior Detective Sergeant Ronnie Brooks
- Ben Bailey Smith as Junior Detective Sergeant Joe Hawkins
- Paterson Joseph as Detective Inspector Wes Leyton (Episodes 1–7)
- Sharon Small as Detective Inspector Elisabeth Flynn (Episode 8)

==== Order ====
- Dominic Rowan as Senior Crown Prosecutor Jacob Thorne
- Georgia Taylor as Junior Crown Prosecutor Kate Barker
- Peter Davison as CPS Director Henry Sharpe

== Episodes ==
No. overall	No. in series	Title	Directed by	Written by	Original release date	UK viewers (millions)	Original Law & Order episode
46	1	"Flaw"	Mat King	Nicholas Hicks-Beach	12 March 2014	4.24 million	"Refuge, Part I" (26 May 1999)
A police car chase ends when the car the police are pursuing crashes into an oncoming lorry, killing the driver. They find another dead body in the boot, with his teeth and hands missing. Ronnie and his new partner Joe Hawkins (Ben Bailey Smith) investigate the death. After questioning a number of suspects, the victim, jeweller Harry Bernstein, has a sister who is on the jury for the trial of Dale Horgan, a drug dealer and murderer that Ronnie tries to apprehend years before. The sister, Rebecca Bernstein, received her brother's severed hands in a box with the message "not guilty". The defence barrister in the trial, Eleanor Richmond (Helen Baxendale), argues that the jury was tampered, and they are dismissed. However, the trial would still continue with Horgan's fate to be determined by the judge alone. However, the judge ultimately finds Horgan not guilty, reasoning that the prosecution has not met their burden of proof. However, Joe manages to convince a witness, a scared young graffiti artist, into revealing what transpired during Harry's murder, by sending him to the scene of the crime. After identifying the murderer, Joe and Ronnie question him, where he reveals that Horgan organised the murder. In turn, Ronnie arrests Horgan again for conspiracy to murder and perverting the course of justice.
47	2	"Safe from Harm"	Mat King	Tom Grieves	19 March 2014	3.88 million	"Betrayal" (5 March 2008)
When Ronnie and Joe investigate the fatal stabbing of Dr Philip Gardner, a psychiatrist with a caseload of violent adolescent patients, their first instinct is to question the young people he was treating. Then evidence suggests that he may have been having an affair with one of them, and they begin to suspect the doctor's wife Alison. Although initially she denies killing her husband, Alison changes her defence as the case stacks up against her. Pleading that she was not in her right mind and lost control at the time of the stabbing, she makes a persuasive case. Her case is in fact so persuasive that Kate begins to question whether Alison should be on trial for murder at all, but Jake is determined to see justice done. Thanks to some last minute detective work, the team are finally able to uncover the truth. Guest starring Ramon Tikaram.
48	3	"I Predict a Riot"	Mat King	Richard Stokes	26 March 2014	4.29 million	"Ramparts" (13 January 1999)
Ronnie and Joe come across a skeleton in a car boot at the bottom of the Thames. It turns out that the dead man was Taylor Kane, a black undercover police officer who went missing at the time of the 1985 Brixton riot. Unsettling evidence comes to light as Ronnie, Joe and Wes begin to raise issues and ask questions which the police would rather forget - and Wes gets an unexpected visit from the Commissioner. In court, Jake takes up the prosecution case as Philip Nevins appears for the defendant, DS Darren Grady. Accusations are thrown and the trial hits the headlines. Wes, Ronnie and Joe are drawn deeper and deeper into a case which sees the law itself in the witness box. Then Kane's sister Nikki comes knocking at their door. It is time to choose sides as friendships and loyalties are tested and careers are put on the line in the interests of justice. Guest starring Roger Lloyd-Pack and Graham Cole.
49	4	"Pride"	Mat King	Matt Evans	2 April 2014	4.29 million	"Identity" (5 November 2003)
Ronnie and Joe are on the hunt for the killer of a seemingly innocent family man when the investigation leads them to Ronnie's old boss, ex-DI Natalie Chandler. The former detective inspector's father is a man in his 70s called Eddie Stewart and he is the prime suspect. Ronnie has a tough time telling Natalie that her father stands accused of murder. No one can understand why Eddie would commit such a crime, least of all his own daughter. Jake and Kate try to be sympathetic, but explain that there is nothing they can do unless Eddie agrees to cooperate – a man has died and someone has to take responsibility. Natalie persuades Ronnie that he must go above and beyond the call of duty to try to find the real killer – a move that gets him into trouble with an increasingly frustrated Wes. Just how far is Ronnie prepared to go to help his old friend? Guest starring Roy Hudd, Harriet Walter, Martin Jarvis and Geoffrey McGivern.
50	5	"Customs"	Joss Agnew	Jamie Crichton	9 April 2014	4.42 million	"Ritual" (17 December 1997)
When the body of an elderly woman is discovered at the foot of a well-known suicide leap, Ronnie detects foul play. The dead woman, Ranya Habib, had no apparent reason for killing herself and the finger of suspicion points at Dr Yafeu Elsayed, recently arrived in the UK to visit her. Ronnie wonders if there might be a terrorist connection, but with no evidence attention turns to Ranya's family - her son Tariq and his wife Safia. Even after the detectives obtain a confession to Ranya's murder, Joe is baffled as to the motive and the whole matter seems to be shrouded in a conspiracy of silence. Then as a shocking revelation comes to light, Joe and Kate join forces. It is a move, which sees Kate about to jeopardise her entire career as she leaves Jake to prosecute the case on his own. Guest starring Haydn Gwynne and Glyn Pritchard.
51	6	"Bad Romance"	Joss Agnew	Louise Ironside	16 April 2014	4.51 million	"Denial" (8 October 1997)
A blood-stained hotel room and a stolen credit card lead Ronnie and Joe to Charles Hutton, a wealthy member of the upper classes who dotes on his wife Camille and daughter Georgia. It is hard to work out what crime has been committed, but Ronnie and Joe have enough evidence to suggest that Georgia gave birth in the hotel room. There is no trace of a baby and it proves difficult for Jake and Kate to mount a prosecution case against Georgia and her boyfriend. To make matters worse, the defence counsel turns out to be an old opponent of Jake's, Maitland Cosby. As the evidence against the young couple stacks up, how far is Georgia's father prepared to go to protect her?
52	7	"Hard Stop"	Jill Robertson	Noel Farragher	23 April 2014	3.97 million	"Criminal Law" (23 November 2005)
When a spate of shootings claims Wes; Ronnie and Joe are left with little time to grieve - they must catch the killer before he or she moves on to the next person on the hit list. The next likely victim seems to be Henry Sharpe, head of the Crown Prosecution Service, but gradually the link between all the targets becomes clear. The connection is Mark Glendon, who has been in prison after being convicted of the murder of his wife four years previously. Although Glendon is still in custody, his case has been reopened for a retrial. The police face an uphill struggle to find any leads implicating Glendon in the shootings. With the new trial already underway, the race is on to catch the killer before the jury deliver their verdict.
53	8	"Repeat to Fade"	Jill Robertson	Richard Stokes	11 June 2014	3.83 million	"Marathon" (17 November 1999)
Still reeling from the shocking death of one of their team, Ronnie and Joe have a new case to deal with when an innocent young mother is stabbed to death in a busy London market place. Under pressure from all sides to solve the case and make Londoners feel safe again, Ronnie and Joe struggle to gather enough evidence to charge the youth they believe is responsible - Bobbi Washington. When Bobbi inadvertently confesses to Ronnie, they think they have got him bang to rights - but with Bobbi's confession uncorroborated by anyone else, both Ronnie's honesty and his future as a detective are in doubt. Note: This episode was originally due to air on 30 April 2014 but was postponed by ITV due to a plot which incorporates events considered too similar to the 28 April murder of teacher Ann Maguire. It was rescheduled for 11 June.
