= Law & Order: UK series 4 =

Law & Order: UK
- Series 4
- No. of episodes: 6

Release
- Original network: ITV
- Original release: 7 March – 11 April 2011

Series chronology
- ← Previous; Series 3 Next → Series 5

The fourth series of Law & Order: UK premiered in the UK on ITV on 7 March 2011 and concluded on 11 April 2011.

== Cast ==
=== Main ===
==== Law ====
- Bradley Walsh as Senior Detective Sergeant Ronnie Brooks
- Jamie Bamber as Junior Detective Sergeant Matt Devlin
- Harriet Walter as Detective Inspector Natalie Chandler

==== Order ====
- Ben Daniels as Senior Crown Prosecutor James Steel
- Freema Agyeman as Junior Crown Prosecutor Alesha Phillips
- Bill Paterson as CPS Director George Castle

== Episodes ==
No. overall	No. in series	Title	Directed by	Written by	Original release date	UK viewers (millions)	Original Law & Order episode
21	1	"Help"	James Strong	Terry Cafolla	2 December 2010 (Canada); 7 March 2011 (UK)	5.70 million	"We Like Mike" (30 April 1997)
Devlin and Brooks investigate the death of a Premiership footballer, Robbie Nicals, the evidence leads to a passer-by, Mike Jones (Lorcan Cranitch), who helped Nicals change a tyre. However, the man is about to get married, and forced to interrupt his nuptials, they interrogate him for details, which unveil a disturbing link to a gangster with connections in the police force and judiciary. Senior Crown prosecutor Steel must convince a man whose wedding was ruined by the investigation to give evidence in public against a renowned thug, whilst holding his own against the obsessive compulsive genius defence barrister Jason Peters (Eddie Marsan).
22	2	"Denial"	Robert Del Maestro	Catherine Tregenna	11 November 2010 (Canada); 14 March 2011 (UK)	4.71 million	"DNR" (6 October 1999)
Brooks and Devlin investigate the shooting of Dame Rachel Callaghan (Juliet Stevenson), a well-known High Court judge, who is shot in the underground car park of her apartment building, in what looks like a carjacking gone wrong. They retrieve the car from a dupe who purchased it, and arrest the middleman in the sale. The middleman blames the crime on a man named Eddie. It becomes apparent that Eddie was hired to kill Callaghan, but his attempt went awry. The detectives believe that Callaghan's husband, Dan (John McArdle), was involved in the murder plot. However, Callaghan takes steps to defend her husband from prosecution, even when she is presented with evidence proving his guilt. Callaghan eventually has her medication withdrawn, prompting Steel to seek the court's permission to question her before she dies. When Callaghan tries to commit suicide, Steel seeks to have her declared mentally incompetent but Judge Mary Hall (Diana Quick) overrules Steel's motion. George is torn between friendship and respecting a person’s right to die as he tries to get Rachel to accept the truth of what has happened.
23	3	"ID"	Andy Goddard	Emilia Di Girolamo	4 November 2010 (Canada); 21 March 2011 (UK)	4.35 million	"Promises to Keep" (10 February 1993)
A pregnant woman is murdered in a car park, Devlin and Brooks believe it to be a crime of passion and suspect her ex-boyfriend. When the ex-boyfriend's alibi is confirmed they look to Joe Nash, the current boyfriend, who says he was with his psychiatric social worker, whom he sees for a severe sleeping disorder. Based on Joe's behaviour, Brooks believes him to be an ex-con who is hiding something. When Joe is arrested, he admits that his real name is Billy Wells and that his new identity was arranged by the Home Office because he is on a life licence for the murder of his teacher when he was eleven years old. When he recants the admission to being Billy Wells, attempts to verify his identity expose a conspiracy that involves high ranking government officials, including the Director of Public Prosecutions and the Home Secretary.
24	4	"Duty of Care"	Julian Holmes	Debbie O'Malley	25 November 2010 (Canada); 28 March 2011 (UK)	4.37 million	"Endurance" (18 October 2000)
A fire starts in a flat above a corner shop, a young mother is forced to leave her disabled 13-year-old son to die. Brooks and Devlin first suspect the shop owner, who has been renowned for insurance scam operations in the past. However, it later becomes clear that the fire was caused by the young boy's mother, who, after believing he had died from an epileptic seizure, decided to start the fire to kill herself. However, when her lawyer Dominic Peck (Oliver Dimsdale) appears to be bending the truth in an attempt to fool the jury, James and Alesha must deal with Peck, who is determined to win at all costs.
25	5	"Shaken"	Paul Wilmshurst	Emila Di Girolamo	18 November 2010 (Canada); 4 April 2011 (UK)	4.69 million	"Homesick" (15 April 1996)
An infant is found dead in his cot, it is suspected that the baby died of cot death. However, when it is revealed that the baby died as a result of being shaken, Brooks and Devlin initially suspect the live-in nanny, especially after she admits to being the only person around the baby in the 24 hours preceding his death. Things begin to get complicated, however, when it is discovered that other people were in the house that day. The live-in nanny's boyfriend soon falls under suspicion, as his rough attitude with his four-year-old nephew has come under suspicion from social services. However, it soon becomes clear that the nanny may have been having an off-day, and a quick reaction to a minor incident may have caused the fatal move.
26	6	"Skeletons"	Andy Goddard	Catherine Tregenna	9 December 2010 (Canada); 11 April 2011 (UK)	4.71 million	"Trophy" (31 January 1996)
After a series of murders are committed across London with the same motive, it is suspected that Andrew Dillon, a serial killer from six years previous has returned to commit further crimes. However, Brooks and Devlin manage to track a new man down, and it seems that he was also responsible for the deaths Dillon supposedly committed. However, an alibi provided at the time by a deceased witness seemed to leave Dillon in the clear, despite the fact there is no evidence to back it up either way. It never reached court, however, so it would seem Steel apparently deleted the alibi and is accused of perverting the course of justice. Finding himself on the wrong side of the law, Steel battles for his career and his freedom.
