= Law & Order: UK series 5 =

Law & Order: UK
- Series 5
- No. of episodes: 6

Release
- Original network: ITV
- Original release: 10 July – 14 August 2011

Series chronology
- ← Previous; Series 4 Next → Series 6

The fifth series of Law & Order: UK premiered on ITV on 10 July 2011 and concluded on 14 August 2011. In the US, it was broadcast on BBC America.

== Cast ==
=== Main ===
==== Law ====
- Bradley Walsh as Senior Detective Sergeant Ronnie Brooks
- Jamie Bamber as Junior Detective Sergeant Matt Devlin
- Harriet Walter as Detective Inspector Natalie Chandler

==== Order ====
- Dominic Rowan as Senior Crown Prosecutor Jacob Thorne
- Freema Agyeman as Junior Crown Prosecutor Alesha Phillips
- Peter Davison as CPS Director Henry Sharpe

== Episodes ==
No. overall	No. in series	Title	Directed by	Written by	Original release date	UK viewers (millions)	Original Law & Order episode
27	1	"The Wrong Man"	Marisol Adler	Debbie O'Malley	10 July 2011	6.77 million	"Prescription for Death" (13 September 1990)
18-year-old Suzanne Morton dies in unknown circumstances on a busy hospital ward, her father calls upon the help of Brooks and Devlin to find out just what caused her death. They discover that the A&E she was treated on has had three such untimely deaths within six months, and that her death may have been caused by a conflict between the drugs she was given and the medication she was taking at the time. Brooks and Devlin suspect Dr Grant, who was known to have treated her that evening. Things become complicated, however, when it is discovered that half of her medical notes have vanished, the report on the night in question has been doctored, and the suspect has bought a one-way ticket to Belgium. Brooks and Devlin catch up with their suspect, only to unravel a web of lies, involving a chiropodist who has been posing a doctor, a triage nurse who has been paid to keep silent, and a well respected doctor with a history of alcohol abuse who has been secretly addicted to codeine for three years. Senior Crown Prosecutor Jake Thorne must decide which one to prosecute in order to get justice for Suzanne's death.
28	2	"Safe"	Julian Holmes	Emilia Di Girolamo	17 July 2011	5.43 million	"Angel" (29 November 1995)
When Kayla Stark reports that her two-year-old son, Ryan, has been taken from a high-street merry go round, Brooks and Devlin suspect that her ex-boyfriend, who is also the child's father, may be responsible. However, upon examination of the CCTV footage, the pair discover that the child was never on the merry-go-round, and that the buggy Kayla was pushing at the time was empty. Suspicion then turns to Kayla's current partner, and when the boy is found dead in the airing cupboard at his flat, Brooks and Devlin believe they have their man. However, without any evidence proving whether Kayla or her boyfriend killed Ryan, Thorne and Phillips must decide which guilty party to prosecute.
29	3	"Crush"	Mat King	Nicholas Hicks-Beach	24 July 2011	5.31 million	"Humiliation" (22 November 1995)
A Czech Escort Katerina Cizik is found stabbed to death in her hotel room, Brooks and Devlin immediately suspect a case of blackmail, when £4,000 and a log of payments are found in the woman's bedside table. Suspicion falls on the hotel porter, who was conveniently out of the building at the time - but a secret relationship between a respected male practitioner and the escort comes to light, and soon leads Thorne and Phillips to believe that the jealous wife of the practitioner is prepared to frame her husband, as his meetings with the escort have led to her son being born brain-damaged, caused by an STD which the husband contracted from the escort, and in turn gave to his wife.
30	4	"Tick Tock"	Mark Everest	Richard Stokes	31 July 2011	4.93 million	"Hot Pursuit" (8 November 1995)
While investigating the shooting of two innocent bystanders in a local nightclub, Brooks and Devlin's night goes from bad to worse when they realize have a possible hostage situation in their hands. Then they are called to a third shooting of a local off-licence attendant by a pair of burglars wearing rubber face masks. When a fourth body is found - the owner of the nightclub - suspicion falls on a mentally unstable Iraq War veteran Andy Bishop - and when the team finally catch up with Andy, things take a terrible turn when he is shot by his girlfriend. When the case comes to trial, the court has to decide: Was she a terrified victim who killed her abuser, or a willing participant in the crimes?
31	5	"Intent"	Julian Holmes	Debbie O'Malley	7 August 2011	4.88 million	"Privileged" (5 April 1995)
A housekeeper arrives to find her employers dead, Brooks and Devlin begin an investigation into the murder of David and Elaine Lerner, who had only moved into the house six months ago, and had been doing it up as their dream home for when they retired. When they struggle to find a motive for the killing, their line of investigation soon turns to the previous owners of the house, ex-husband and wife Camilla Mallon (Anna Wilson-Jones) and Lucas Boyd (Samuel West) after discovering that they were part of a major hedge fund scam several years back. When CCTV footage puts Boyd in the area at the time of the killing, they discover that his fingerprints match the one found in Elaine's blood. Boyd, drunk at the wheel of his car, crashed the vehicle while turning a corner, banging his head, and mistakenly returned his old house - and brutally stabbed the Lerners. Thorne and Phillips press for a murder charge, while faced with Jake’s old mentor Margaret Rumsfield (Jill Baker), who argues that the accused should face only manslaughter charges.
32	6	"Deal"	Andy Goddard	Emilia Di Girolamo	14 August 2011	4.86 million	"Slave" (21 April 1996)
Mother-of-one Lia Brown is found shot in her bed, suspicion immediately falls on to her boyfriend, who struggles with MS and has to take medicinal cannabis to help his condition. However, when it is discovered that the bullet was fired from over 100 metres away, Kaden Blake, the thirteen-year-old son of a known addict, comes into the firing line. He claims that he was told to kill his friend Chase Wade, and that when he first fired the gun, he missed Chase and the bullet flew through the air and into Lia's flat, killing her. When it is discovered he was under the instructions of Mark Ellis, a long time criminal and well-known drug dealer, who the police have previously failed to bring to justice, Jake and Alesha offer Kaden a reduced sentence in order to bring Ellis to justice. It soon transpires that Kaden's mother, who is addicted to crack, sold her son to Ellis in exchange for free drugs, and that Ellis had been torturing the boy and making him run illegal errands. Ellis is soon taken to court and found guilty of illegal imprisonment, possession of class A drugs and GBH. Kaden is also given a sentence in a young offender's institution, but after being released from court, he finds himself in the firing line of an armed man driving a 4x4. Devlin manages to spot the gunman, and in an attempt to save Kaden, takes a bullet for him.
