= Sharon Small =

British actress

- Education: Mountview Academy of Theatre Arts
- Occupation: Actress
- Years active: 1994–present
- Spouse: Dan Bridge
- Children: 2

Sharon Small is a Scottish actress known for her work in film, radio, theatre, and television. Perhaps best known for her portrayal of Detective Sergeant Barbara Havers in the BBC television adaptation of The Inspector Lynley Mysteries by Elizabeth George, she is also recognised for her lead roles in Mistresses (as Trudi Malloy), London Kills (as DS Vivienne Cole) and Trust Me (as Dr Brigitte Rayne). She was nominated for an Olivier Award for her performance in a 2022 revival of Good.

== Early life ==
Small is the eldest of five children. She was educated at Kinghorn Primary School in Fife, where she was the Kinghorn Gala Queen in her final year, and at Balwearie High School in Kirkcaldy. Small then studied drama at Kirkcaldy College of Technology (now Fife College), and continued her study at Mountview Academy of Theatre Arts in London from which she graduated in 1989.

== Personal life ==
Small lives in London. She has two sons with her photographer husband Dan Bridge.

== Filmography ==
Film
Year	Title	Role	Production	Notes
1997	Bumping the Odds	Terry	–	Best Actress Award at the Edinburgh Film Festival
1997	Bite	Alison	–	–
1998	Driven	Caroline Hall	Dandelion Films	–
2002	About a Boy	Christine	Universal Pictures	–
2004	Dear Frankie	Marie	Universal	–
2004	Belly Button	Kika	Satellite Pictures	–
2008	Last Chance Harvey	Nurse	Overture Films	–
2008	Pop Art short film	Mrs. Gannon	Forward Films	

Television
Year	Title	Role	Production	Awards
1994	Taggart	Michelle Gibson	SMG Productions	1 episode
1994	Roughnecks	Bernadette	–	1 episode
1995	An Independent Man	Nicola	–	1 episode
1996	Doctor Finlay	Irene Gallagher	–	1 episode
1997	The Bill	Gina Nash	ITV	–
1997	Hamish Macbeth	WPC Anne Patterson	–	1 episode
1997	No Child of Mine	Linda	ITV	–
1999–2000	Sunburn	Carol Simpson	–	14 episodes
2000	Glasgow Kiss	Cara Rossi	–	6 episodes
2003	Cutting It	Boo Wiberley	–	–
2001–2007	The Inspector Lynley Mysteries	DS Barbara Havers	BBC	24 episodes – nominated for Most Popular Actress and the Golden Satellite Award
2005	A Midsummer Night's Dream	Titania	BBC's Shakespeare Retold season	–
2006	Rebus	Miranda Masterson	–	–
2007-2015	Nina and the Neurons	Bud the Taste Neuron	–	11 seasons
2009	Murderland	Dr Laura Maitland	ITV	3 episodes
2008–2010	Mistresses	Trudi Malloy	BBC	16 episodes
2010	Agatha Christie's Marple	Mary Pritchard	ITV adaptation of "Miss Marple: The Blue Geranium", aired in the US on PBS	–
2011	Downton Abbey	Marigold Shore	–	1 episode
2012	Kidnap and Ransom	Beth Cooper	ITV	3 episodes
2012	New Tricks	Minnie/Annabel Tilson	BBC	1 episode
2013	Silent Witness	Geraldine Briggs	BBC	2 episodes
2013	Call the Midwife	Nora Harding	BBC	1 episode
2014	Death in Paradise	Dorothy Foster	BBC	1 episode
2014	Midsomer Murders	Ruth Cameron	ITV “Wild Harvest”	1 episode
2014	Law & Order: UK	Inspector Elisabeth Flynn	ITV	1 episode
2015	Stonemouth	Connie Murston	BBC	2 episodes
2017	Born to Kill	Cathy	World Productions	4 episodes
2017	Trust Me	Dr Brigitte Rayne	BBC	4 episodes
2019–	London Kills	DS Vivienne Cole	Acorn TV	Main role, 4 series, 20 episodes
2020	Flesh and Blood	Stella	ITV	4 episodes
2021	The Bay	Rose Marshbrook	ITV1	6 Episodes
2024	Nightsleeper	Liz Draycott	BBC	6 Episodes

Radio
Title	Role
At The Foot of the Cross	Narrator
High Table, Lower Orders	Zoe
"Dr. Finlay – The Adventures of a Black Bag"	Nurse Angus
Angel	Lorraine
The Order of Release	Effie Ruskin

== Stage ==
Year	Title	Role	Production
1994	The Threepenny Opera by Bertolt Brecht	Polly Peachum	Donmar Warehouse
1996	The Nun	–	Greenwich Studio Theatre
1998	London Cuckolds by Edward Ravencroft	–	Royal National Theatre
2004	When Harry Met Sally...	Marie Fisher	Theatre Royal Haymarket
2005	Lear by Edward Bond	Fortanelle	Sheffield Crucible Theatre
2009	Life Is A Dream	Estrella	Donmar Warehouse
2010	Spur of the Moment by Anya Reiss	Vicky Evans	Royal Court Theatre
2010	Men Should Weep by Ena Lamont Stewart	Maggie Morrison	National Theatre
2014	Arden of Faversham by Anonymous	Alice Arden	Royal Shakespeare Company
2015	Carmen Disruption	The Singer	Almeida Theatre
2015	Luna Gale by Rebecca Gilman	Caroline	Hampstead Theatre
2016	The Threepenny Opera by Bertolt Brecht	Jenny Diver	Royal National Theatre
2018	Still Alice	Alice Howland	West Yorkshire Playhouse
2022	The Trials by Dawn King	Defendant Three	Donmar Warehouse
2022	Good by C.P. Taylor	Helen	Harold Pinter Theatre
2024	Nye by Tim Price	Jennie Lee	Royal National Theatre

== Awards and honours ==
Year	Award	Category	Nominated Work	Result
1997	Edinburgh Film Festival	Best Actress Award	Bumping the Odds	Won
2007	Golden Satellite Awards	Best Award	The Inspector Lynley Mysteries	Nominated
2023	Laurence Olivier Awards	Best Supporting Actress	Good	Nominated
