= Terry Cafolla =

Northern Irish screenwriter

- Born: 1969 (age 56–57); Armagh, Northern Ireland, UK
- Occupation: Screenwriter
- Writing career
- Genres: Drama, Crime
- Notable works: Law and Order: UK, Holy Cross
- Notable awards: Golden FIPA

Terry Cafolla is a Northern Irish screenwriter.

== Early life ==
Terry Cafolla was born in Armagh in 1969. He left Armagh to study at Queen's University, where he completed a degree in Philosophy and Russian studies before subsequently obtaining an MA in Poetry. After leaving college, following a short spell on a media-training course, Cafolla secured a one-year contract with a Belfast film collective. Cafolla himself cites the fact that both poetry and American TV drama had a large influence over him in his adolescence, despite the fact that "TV never seemed an option for somebody from Armagh".

== Career ==
His first television drama Holy Cross (2003) examined the emotive events which occurred on Belfast’s Ardoyne Road in 2001 and signalled the emergence of a television writer of skill and sensitivity. This first foray into television drama earned Cafolla a BAFTA nomination for best new Drama, and a Golden FIPA award for best screenplay. Cafolla has since contributed to the TV drama Messiah and has written episodes for both series of Law & Order: UK, a British adaptation of the long-running US crime series. Other notable work includes a drama-documentary on the life of George Best, and an episode of the TV fantasy series, Camelot.

He wrote The Whale, a television film starring Martin Sheen that aired on BBC One in 2014. He wrote an episode of the historical drama Britannia in 2017.
