= Emilia di Girolamo =

British television screenwriter

Emilia di Girolamo is a British television screenwriter and author. Di Girolamo has also written articles and blog posts for The Guardian newspaper. Her daughter Raffiella by actor Dom Chapman is an actress.

== Early life and education ==
Di Girolamo got a First in Drama from Middlesex University, and remained at that institution for a PhD focusing on the rehabilitation of offenders using drama-based techniques.

== Writing career ==
Di Girolamo started writing for the popular long-running drama EastEnders in 2008. She joined the core writing team for series 3 and 4 of Law & Order: UK in 2009, and was Lead Writer and took on a Co-Producer role for series 5 and 6. She penned a total of 13 episodes before announcing her departure after season 6 (to pursue other projects). Di Girolamo returned as a guest writer to do the two-part season opener for season 7, "Tracks" and "Tremors".

Di Girolamo joined The Tunnel as showrunner for season 3, The Tunnel: Vengeance, a Kudos/Sky Atlantic production that aired in December 2017. Later, she wrote the script for an episode of the period drama Medici: Masters of Florence.

In 2021, di Girolamo wrote the television drama miniseries Deceit.

She adapted a series of Louise Penny mystery novels as lead writer. She served as executive producer (alongside series lead Alfred Molina and others) for the police drama, titled Three Pines, for Amazon Prime Video.
