= Law & Order season 5 =

Season of American television series

Law & Order
- Season 5
- Season 5 U.S. DVD cover
- Starring: Jerry Orbach; Chris Noth; S. Epatha Merkerson; Sam Waterston; Jill Hennessy; Steven Hill
- No. of episodes: 23

Release
- Original network: NBC
- Original release: September 21, 1994 – May 24, 1995

Season chronology
- ← Previous; Season 4 Next → Season 6

The fifth season of Law & Order aired on NBC between September 21, 1994, and May 24, 1995.

== Cast ==
=== Changes ===
Jack McCoy (played by Sam Waterston) replaced Ben Stone (Michael Moriarty) as Executive Assistant District Attorney. This was the final main season appearance of Det. Mike Logan, played by Chris Noth. Noth would reprise the role in the 1998 television movie Exiled, as well as seasons 5–7 of the second spin-off series Law & Order: Criminal Intent.

=== Main ===
- Jerry Orbach as Senior Detective Lennie Briscoe
- Chris Noth as Junior Detective Det. Mike Logan
- S. Epatha Merkerson as Lieutenant Anita Van Buren
- Sam Waterston as Executive Assistant District Attorney Jack McCoy
- Jill Hennessy as Assistant District Attorney Claire Kincaid
- Steven Hill as District Attorney Adam Schiff

=== Recurring ===
- Dann Florek as Captain Don Cragen
- Carolyn McCormick as Dr. Elizabeth Olivet
- Leslie Hendrix as M.E. Dr. Elizabeth Rodgers
- John Fiore as Detective Tony Profaci

=== Guest stars ===
- Polly Adams
- Nancy Addison
- Sidney Armus
- Elizabeth Ashley
- Leslie Ayvazian
- Blake Bashoff
- Jerome Preston Bates
- Steve Burns as Kevin Jeffries
- Claiborne Cary
- Dominic Chianese
- Marilyn Chris
- Jude Ciccolella
- Chuck Cooper
- Marc Coppola
- Christopher Cousins
- Ann Crumb
- Leila Danette
- Cynthia Darlow
- Raúl Dávila
- Joey Dedio
- Bob Dishy
- Lisa Emery
- Peter Facinelli
- Edie Falco
- Tibor Feldman
- Peter Friedman
- Jack Gilpin
- Alan Gordon
- Dan Grimaldi
- Daniel Hagen
- Anthony Heald
- Jonathan Hogan
- Anna Holbrook
- Erik Jensen
- Thomas Kopache
- Ilene Kristen
- William Kunstler as himself
- Ron Leibman
- Laura Linney as Martha Bowen
- Deirdre Lovejoy
- Marcella Lowery
- Will Lyman
- J. C. MacKenzie
- Vanessa Marshall
- Alison Martin
- Michael Mastro
- Jan Maxwell
- Larry Miller
- Aleta Mitchell
- Debra Monk
- Leslie Nipkow
- Kevin O'Rourke
- Vincent Pastore
- Sarah Paulson as Maggie Conner
- Mary Beth Peil
- Larry Pine
- David Pittu
- Victor Raider-Wexler
- Tony Roberts
- Nada Rowand
- James Saito
- Ruben Santiago-Hudson
- Paul Schulze
- John Scurti
- Stephen Shellen
- Tom Shillue
- Norman Snow
- Fredro Starr
- Lee Summers
- Akira Takayama
- Regina Taylor
- Maria Tucci
- Aida Turturro
- John Ventimiglia
- Floyd Vivino
- Hynden Walch
- Jessica Walter
- Dick Anthony Williams
- Michael Willis
- Samuel E. Wright
- Michael Zaslow

== Episodes ==
No. overall	No. in season	Title	Directed by	Written by	Original release date	Prod. code	U.S. viewers (millions)
89	1	"Second Opinion"	Ed Sherin	Michael S. Chernuchin & Jeremy R. Littman	September 21, 1994	69408	18.3
A woman's death exposes an unorthodox method of treating cancer that new Executive Assistant DA McCoy intends to prove is negligent homicide. Cast: First appearance of Sam Waterston as Executive Assistant District Attorney Jack McCoy.
90	2	"Coma"	Jace Alexander	Ed Zuckerman	September 28, 1994	69406	19.5
Comedy-club owner Michael Dobson comes under suspicion for having shot his wife, now comatose with a bullet in her head, after it is discovered he was abusive and she was about to divorce him. Note: The events of this episode continue in the following season's episode "Encore".
91	3	"Blue Bamboo"	Don Scardino	S : Hall Powell; T : Morgan Gendel; S/T : René Balcer	October 5, 1994	69402	15.5
The killing of Shinro Hayashi, a Japanese nightclub owner who was visiting New York City, leads to the arrest of singer Martha Bowen, whose lawyer uses the "battered-woman syndrome" as a defense. While assisting on the case, Olivet remembers her own prior sexual assault.
92	4	"Family Values"	Constantine Makris	René Balcer & William N. Fordes	October 12, 1994	69401	17.7
A missing victim Laura Madsen, a suspicious ex-husband Victor Connor, and a family hiding something all contribute to the ADAs' decision to risk their licenses on a hunch. After ruling out suicide, McCoy and Kincaid turn their focus on the missing woman's daughter Maggie Conner – and take a giant leap to prove their far-fetched theory. Note: This episode was the basis for the Law & Order: UK episode "Fatherly Love".
93	5	"White Rabbit"	Steven Robman	Ed Zuckerman & Morgan Gendel	October 19, 1994	69411	18.2
A burglary unlocks a decades-old case. A safety deposit box company unwittingly exposes a female political activist-fugitive who has been hiding for over 20 years. Detectives locate and arrest one of the four involved in the burglary, and ultimately catch the female fugitive who is accused of killing a policeman during a 1971 robbery.
94	6	"Competence"	Fred Gerber	Michael S. Chernuchin & Mark B. Perry	November 2, 1994	69409	17.9
When Lt. Van Buren is the victim of an attempted holdup by two teens, she fires her gun and kills one of them, and the detectives are faced with the fact that she shot an unarmed child in the back.
95	7	"Precious"	Constantine Makris	René Balcer & I.C. Rapoport	November 9, 1994	69410	17.5
When Briscoe and Logan suspect that a missing infant may have been murdered rather than kidnapped, they uncover a terrible family secret.
96	8	"Virtue"	Martha Mitchell	Mark B. Perry & Jeremy R. Littman	November 23, 1994	69412	18.7
McCoy uses a charge of "larceny by extortion" against Spencer Talbert, a councilman whose former colleague claims he demanded sex in exchange for a law-firm partnership.
97	9	"Scoundrels"	Marc Laub	Ed Zuckerman & Charles C. Mann	November 30, 1994	69415	18.3
Among the suspects in a lawyer's murder are a swindler who conned a woman out of her family fortune, and the woman's once-wealthy son.
98	10	"House Counsel"	James Quinn	Michael S. Chernuchin & Barry M. Schkolnick	January 4, 1995	69413	16.4
The killing of David Lampert, a man who had served as a juror in a mob trial, leads to a battle of wills between McCoy and his long-time friend, the suspect's attorney.
99	11	"Guardian"	Christopher Misiano	S : Brad Markowitz; T : William N. Fordes; S/T : René Balcer	January 11, 1995	69404	16.6
After the body of a young female junkie is identified as Katie Blanchard the daughter of a wealthy family, Briscoe and Logan try to find out who left her to die in the yard of a day-care center.
100	12	"Progeny"	Don Scardino	S : Mark B. Perry; T : Ed Zuckerman; S/T : Morgan Gendel	January 25, 1995	69416	16.4
After the murder of Eleen Reed an abortion-clinic doctor, Briscoe and Logan are led to a suspect who belongs to a radical anti-abortion movement and their suspicion soon turns to the group's leader, who admits that he's glad the doctor died. McCoy faces the unpleasant task of charging the respected and charismatic former priest with murder, and the public debate over whether the secular community should interfere in spiritual matters.
101	13	"Rage"	Arthur W. Forney	Michael S. Chernuchin	February 1, 1995	69414	17.1
Wall Street broker Benjamin Greer is accused of murdering his mentor Wallace Holbrook, and uses the defense of "black rage" in court.
102	14	"Performance"	Martha Mitchell	S : René Balcer; T : Ed Zuckerman; S/T : Jeremy R. Littman	February 8, 1995	69419	16.2
Briscoe and Logan set out to identify the apparent victim in a snuff film, Corey Russell, but find her alive and the victim of a points-for-sex club at her prestigious high school.
103	15	"Seed"	Don Scardino	Michael S. Chernuchin & Janis Diamond	February 15, 1995	69420	16.8
A routine investigation into a woman's death leads Briscoe and Logan to a fertility doctor guilty of unethical practices, but who apparently cannot be touched because of confidentiality rules, and patient reluctance to talk.
104	16	"Wannabe"	Lewis H. Gould	René Balcer & I.C. Rapoport	March 15, 1995	69417	16.0
The shooting of Bill Presscott, a board member of an exclusive private school, leads to a blue-collar family and a classist system.
105	17	"Act of God"	Constantine Makris	Ed Zuckerman & Walter Dallenbach	March 22, 1995	69422	16.0
A bomb at a construction site kills a 12-year-old boy, and the suspects include the bankrupt contractor and a jealous husband.
106	18	"Privileged"	Vincent Misiano	Jeremy R. Littman & Suzanne O'Malley	April 5, 1995	69418	14.6
The investigation into David and Eileen Lerner, a double homicide, leads to a young alcoholic whose family once lived in the victims' house and admitted to his AA group that he had nightmares about the killings.
107	19	"Cruel and Unusual"	Matthew Penn	René Balcer & Michael S. Chernuchin	April 19, 1995	69423	15.5
The death of Kevin Jeffries, an autistic youth in custody, reveals a multitude of unusual and possibly illegal therapies being used, but also parents reluctant to pursue a prosecution.
108	20	"Bad Faith"	Dann Florek	René Balcer	April 26, 1995	69426	13.4
Logan relives unhappy childhood memories when a friend, Det. Marino, is found dead. It is a presumed suicide, until the investigation reveals recent contact with a former priest who has a history of pedophilia.
109	21	"Purple Heart"	Arthur W. Forney	Morgan Gendel & William N. Fordes	May 3, 1995	69421	14.1
The investigation into a taxi driver's murder involves a loan shark, a missing plumber, a forged check, and the victim's wife.
110	22	"Switch"	Christopher Misiano	Jeremy R. Littman & Sibyl Gardner	May 17, 1995	69425	14.1
Suspects in a psychiatrist's murder include the victim's ex-husband, a patient suffering from multiple-personality disorder and her obstructive father.
111	23	"Pride"	Ed Sherin	Ed Zuckerman & Gene Ritchings	May 24, 1995	69427	13.4
Gay city councilman Richard Durban is murdered and the trail leads to Joe Gibb, a male prostitute found with Durban's belongings, and Kevin Crossley, a bigoted rival politician who Durban had removed from city council. Cast: Last appearance of Chris Noth as Junior Detective Mike Logan.

== Critical reception ==
Alan Sepinwall wrote in TV (The Book) that the casting lineup in season 5 was the best out of all the seasons of Law & Order, stating that it was "[t]he '27 Yankees of L&O casts, featuring not only Hall of Famers at every position but the very best example of each respective role in the franchise's history."
