= Law & Order season 4 =

Season of American television series

Law & Order
- Season 4
- Season 4 U.S. DVD cover
- Starring: Jerry Orbach; Chris Noth; S. Epatha Merkerson; Michael Moriarty; Jill Hennessy; Steven Hill; Carolyn McCormick
- No. of episodes: 22

Release
- Original network: NBC
- Original release: September 15, 1993 – May 25, 1994

Season chronology
- ← Previous; Season 3 Next → Season 5

The fourth season of Law & Order aired on NBC between September 15, 1993, and May 25, 1994. This is the final season to feature Michael Moriarty as Ben Stone. It is also the first season to include a shorter opening sequence and theme (at 46 seconds), which would be used for the remainder of the series' run. Season four was released on DVD December 6, 2005.

== Cast ==
=== Changes ===
There were two cast changes from season 3:

- Anita Van Buren (played by S. Epatha Merkerson) replaced Don Cragen (Dann Florek) in the role of the detectives' supervisor (although Van Buren was a Lieutenant while Cragen had held the more senior rank of Captain)
- Claire Kincaid (played by Jill Hennessy) replaced Paul Robinette (Richard Brooks) as Assistant District Attorney.

This was the first time women played any of Law & Order's six major characters: both roles would continue to be occupied by women, with Merkerson remaining in the role of Van Buren, through the show's cancellation at the end of its 20th season, although she did not return when it was later revived. It was also the first time in Law & Order's history that two major cast changes were made simultaneously; the next such double change did not happen until the beginning of season 17.

Michael Moriarty, who played Executive Assistant District Attorney Ben Stone, left the series at the end of the 4th season and was replaced by Sam Waterston as Executive Assistant District Attorney Jack McCoy from 1994 until 2008, when he became District Attorney.

=== Main ===
- Jerry Orbach as Senior Detective Lennie Briscoe
- Chris Noth as Junior Detective Mike Logan
- S. Epatha Merkerson as Lieutenant Anita Van Buren
- Michael Moriarty as Executive Assistant District Attorney Ben Stone
- Jill Hennessy as Assistant District Attorney Claire Kincaid
- Steven Hill as District Attorney Adam Schiff
- Carolyn McCormick as Dr. Elizabeth Olivet

=== Recurring ===
- Leslie Hendrix as Medical Examiner Dr. Elizabeth Rodgers
- John Fiore as Detective Tony Profaci

=== Guest ===
- Tovah Feldshuh as Defense Attorney Danielle Melnick

== Episodes ==
No. overall	No. in season	Title	Directed by	Written by	Original release date	Prod. code	U.S. viewers (millions)
67	1	"Sweeps"	James Frawley	Craig McNeer & Robert Nathan	September 22, 1993	69009	13.6
Briscoe and Logan investigate after a convicted child molester, Dr. Joseph Vinton, is murdered on a controversial talk show hosted by Rick Mason. The shooter is easily identified — he's Sid Fisher, the father of the dead man's victim from three years earlier. During the course of the investigation, however, the detectives find evidence that leads them to believe that Mason may have set up Vinton's murder so as to assure high ratings during sweeps period. Stone's case is made more difficult because Sid Fisher isn't willing to say anything that could put his son, Scotty, on the stand. Cast: First appearance of S. Epatha Merkerson as Lieutenant Anita Van Buren, and Jill Hennessy as Assistant District Attorney Claire Kincaid. Guest starring: Robert Klein, David Krumholtz, Alexandra Gersten-Vassilaros, Steve Ryan, Melissa Leo, William Bogert, Jim Boyd
68	2	"Volunteers"	James Quinn	René Balcer	September 29, 1993	69017	13.7
A disruptive, unbalanced homeless man Roland Kirk is found severely beaten in an alley of the middle-class neighborhood he calls home, leading Stone to try and prosecute one of the residents for premeditated murder. Guest starring: Nicolas Coster, Kent Broadhurst, Denis O'Hare, Gareth Williams, Betsy Aidem, Harsh Nayyar, Doug Barron, Jill Tasker, Billy Van. Note: This episode was the basis for the Law & Order: UK episode "Community Service"
69	3	"Discord"	Ed Sherin	Michael S. Chernuchin	October 6, 1993	69012	15.3
When college student Julia Wood charges an admittedly promiscuous rock star, C Square, with rape, he claims the act was consensual. Logan and Briscoe investigate the crime and soon learn that C Square isn't the nice guy he would have everyone believe. Guest starring: Lucy Deakins, Sebastian Roché, Karron Graves, Boris McGiver, J. Grant Albrecht
70	4	"Profile"	E.W. Swackhamer	T : Ed Zuckerman; S/T : Gordon Rayfield	October 13, 1993	69010	16.0
After a number of neighborhood residents are murdered, the police follow the investigation to a local racist who is murdering people he doesn't feel belong in his neighborhood. Stone finds himself facing a prominent black attorney representing the murderer. Guest starring: Joe Seneca, Cecilia Hart, James Earl Jones, Frances Chaney, Faran Tahir, Reggie Montgomery, Sharon Angela, Shawn Michael Howard, Glenn Taranto
71	5	"Black Tie"	Arthur W. Forney	Walon Green & Michael S. Chernuchin	October 20, 1993	69004	16.3
After Jonathan Keyes, a wealthy man is found dead in his home, the police receive an anonymous tip that he was murdered. Logan and Briscoe encounter difficulties at the scene when the widow Danielle Keyes and her attorney Norman Rothenburg refuse to allow an autopsy, and by the time Rodgers is able to examine the body, it has already been embalmed. The medical examiner claims the death was natural causes, and even though the state finally gets the necessary proof that the death was murder, the methods used to obtain the needed evidence come under question when Stone tries the case in court. Guest starring: Caroline Lagerfelt, Viveca Lindfors, Beverly Johnson, Hudson Leick, Robert Cicchini, Malcolm Gets, Richard Bright, Lewis Arlt, Graham Brown, Daniel Zelman
72	6	"Pride and Joy"	Gilbert Shilton	Edward Pomerantz & Robert Nathan	October 27, 1993	69006	16.2
When building superintendent Frank McKinnon is found murdered in the basement of the building he works and lives in, Logan and Briscoe initially investigate the crime as a potential break-in until forensics discovers that the "break-in" was staged. The state's attention soon turns to Sean, Frank's 17-year-old son. Dr. Olivet determines the son is an abusive sociopath after interviewing him. But when the victim's wife claims that Frank beat his family on a regular basis, Stone and Kincaid try to determine who is telling the truth. Guest starring: Pamela Payton-Wright, Gabriel Olds, Lauren Ambrose, Paul Collins, Tom Everett Scott
73	7	"Apocrypha"	Gabrielle Beaumont	Michael S. Chernuchin	November 3, 1993	69013	14.9
Stone and Kincaid try to prove that Wendy Berman, the young woman believed to have planted a bomb in a parking garage, had been brainwashed and was acting under the direct orders of Daniel Hendricks, the charismatic leader of a local cult known as the Acherusian Temple. Guest starring: Bibi Besch, Ted Sorel, Joyce Ebert, Sam Robards, Tim Kelleher, Neal Huff, Paul O'Brien, Charles Malik Whitfield
74	8	"American Dream"	Constantine Makris	Sibyl Gardner	November 10, 1993	69018	14.4
A dig at a building site uncovers the body of Sid Cohen, who had gone missing and been presumed murdered years earlier. The identification of the body proves troublesome for Stone, who had initially prosecuted Phillip Swann fourteen years earlier and had obtained a conviction. Swann uses inconsistencies between the original trial and the location of the body to seek an appeal. Guest starring: Željko Ivanek, Scott Sowers, Mark Tymchyshyn, Sophie Hayden, Guy Davis, Matt Malloy. Note: This episode was the basis for the Law & Order: UK episode "Unsafe".
75	9	"Born Bad"	Fred Gerber	Michael S. Chernuchin & Sally Nemeth	November 17, 1993	69021	15.6
When teenager Chris Pollit beats a fellow foster home resident Johnny Lasky to death, his lawyer Helen Brolin seeks a not guilty verdict by reason of genetic defect, claiming that Pollit is genetically predisposed to violence because he has an extra Y chromosome. Guest starring: Maria Tucci, Wil Horneff, Helen Gallagher, James Madio, Vivienne Benesch, Ben Shenkman, Shona Tucker, Matthew Arkin, Kitty Chen, Lillias White, Alan Gordon, Laurence Mason. Note: This episode was the basis for the Law & Order: UK episode "Unloved".
76	10	"The Pursuit of Happiness"	Dann Florek	Morgan Gendel & Robert Nathan	November 24, 1993	69005	17.0
When Billy Cooper is found murdered at the meat-packing plant where he works, Logan and Briscoe turn their eye to his wife Irina, a green card bride from Russia who had married Cooper in the hopes of a better life but had fallen in love with a co-worker and lost favor with her husband, who repeatedly threatened to send her back. Guest starring: Faith Prince, Bruce Altman, Jesse Corti, Natalya Negoda, Mary Lim, George T. Odom
77	11	"Golden Years"	Helaine Head	T : Ed Zuckerman; S/T : Doug Palau	December 1, 1993	69008	15.2
After 82-year-old Mildred Bauer is found dead in her apartment, suspicion immediately turns to her at-home caregiver and her boyfriend until the medical examiner reveals that the elderly woman had been starved to death. Feeding instructions given to Maria by Laura, the deceased woman's granddaughter, turn Stone's eye on the young woman, and she is charged with neglect and grave indifference to human life. Guest starring: Jan Miner, Julie Dretzin, Michael Ryan, Daniel Dae Kim, Lynda Gravátt, Melissa Hurst, Natalie Toro, Brian Williams, Chad L. Coleman, Tovah Feldshuh. Note: This episode was the basis for the Law & Order: UK episode "Mortal".
78	12	"Snatched"	Constantine Makris	Walon Green & René Balcer	January 12, 1994	69024	15.3
After Sol Bregman is arrested while trying to exchange a ransom payoff for his kidnapped son, Logan and Briscoe find themselves trying to find Jason Bregman while trying to stop the father, a millionaire and a close friend of Adam Schiff, from interfering in the investigation. Once Jason Bregman is found, suspicion turns to the victim himself. Guest starring: Theodore Bikel, Vyto Ruginis, Reg Rogers, George Guidall, Caitlin Dulany, Gerry Becker, Leonard Jackson, Brian Howe, Rosanna Carter, Tiger Haynes
79	13	"Breeder"	Arthur W. Forney	Michael S. Chernuchin & René Balcer	January 26, 1994	69023	19.3
Debra Elkins claims to have passed out in a cab after giving birth only to wake up and discover her baby is missing, but it isn't long before Briscoe and Logan follow the trail of evidence to her boyfriend, Steven Shaw, who is keeping the baby in a hotel at Debra's request. As the investigation continues, Stone and Kincaid find three separate couples who had been led to believe that they would be the baby's adoptive parents, but it appears that Debra has no intention of giving her baby to any of them. Guest starring: Deirdre O'Connell, Ann Dowd, Ellen Parker, Judson Mills, Marie Masters, Robert LuPone, Marcella Lowery, Erica Gimpel, Bernadette Quigley
80	14	"Censure"	Ed Sherin	William N. Fordes	February 2, 1994	69026	19.0
When the investigation into threats on a 5-year-old girl leads to a judge that Kincaid had been romantically involved with when she clerked under him, she asks Ben to take her off the case. When Thayer is brought to trial, he insinuates that Kincaid deliberately pointed the witness in his direction, claiming that she had approached him in an inappropriate manner while she worked with him. Guest starring: David Groh, Kip Niven, Jane Kaczmarek, Lee Bryant, Enrico Colantoni, Bruce Adler, Christopher Misiano
81	15	"Kids"	Don Scardino	Michael Harbert & Robert Nathan	February 9, 1994	69028	16.3
When 14-year-old Angel Ramirez is shot dead while out with two friends, the investigation leads to a local gun dealer, Juan Domingo. While investigating Domingo, Briscoe and Logan learn that he was a recent suspect in a shooting that paralyzed a teenage boy, and Briscoe finds himself in an awkward position when Kevin Parker, the son of Ted Parker an old friend of Briscoe's, ends up being the prime suspect in young Angel's homicide. Guest starring: Philip Bosco, Danny Gerard, Robert Hogan, Tresa Hughes, Marilyn Cooper, Elizabeth Parrish, Guillermo Díaz, Pamela Blair, John Griesemer, Alan Blumenfeld, Ron Ostrow
82	16	"Big Bang"	Dann Florek	Ed Zuckerman	March 2, 1994	69027	15.7
A nuclear physicist Edward Manning becomes the chief suspect when his estranged wife Florence, who has been delaying divorce proceedings, is the victim of a mail bomb. Guest starring: Randle Mell, Harris Yulin, Karen Sillas, Jeanne Paulsen, Vincent Pastore
83	17	"Mayhem"	James Quinn	S : Walon Green; T : René Balcer; S/T : Michael S. Chernuchin	April 20, 1994	69029	16.6
During a 24-hour period, Briscoe and Logan have to deal with three unrelated homicides: an aspiring actor shot in the head, a woman maiming her cheating husband, and a store owner killed in a robbery. Guest starring: Kathrine Narducci, Alice Drummond, Shae D'lyn, Robin Tunney, Victor Colicchio, George Bartenieff, Saul Stein, Lou Martini Jr., John Morrison, Leila Danette, Jack Landrón. Notes: This episode was the basis for the Law & Order: UK episode "Dawn till Dusk". One of the cases in this episode is revisited in "Entitled" (2000), a two-parter which begins on Law & Order: Special Victims Unit.
84	18	"Wager"	Ed Sherin	S : Michael S. Chernuchin; T : Kevin Arkadie; S/T : Harvey Solomon	April 27, 1994	69002	16.3
Briscoe and Logan bet that the killing of Ben Williams, a star athlete's father, is linked to gambling debts and threats to the baseball player's family, but it turns out the son Pat's alibi does not hold up, and he ends up under suspicion himself. Guest starring: Richard Libertini, Malik Yoba, Ray Aranha, Steve Harris, Keith Hernandez, Zakes Mokae, O.L. Duke, Myra Lucretia Taylor, Ernestine Jackson, Woodie King Jr., James A. Baffico
85	19	"Sanctuary"	Arthur W. Forney	Michael S. Chernuchin & William N. Fordes	May 4, 1994	69030	17.1
A black minister fans the flames of racial intolerance after a Jewish man, Joshua Berger, is not indicted for a hit-and-run which resulted in the death of black 12-year-old Damon Fox. The result is a riot which ends in a black teenager beating an Italian man to death after he mistook him for Jewish. Guest starring: Tony Todd, Michael Constantine, Beatrice Winde, Elaine Bromka, Arthur French, J.K. Simmons, (Note: Simmons portrays cameraman Jerry Luppin in the episode. Later on, Simmons would recur on the series as psychologist Dr. Emil Skoda in seasons 8–15 & 20) Sean Nelson, Carl Cofield. Note: In 1997, TV Guide ranked this episode #79 on its list of the 100 Greatest Episodes.
86	20	"Nurture"	Jace Alexander	Paris Qualles & Ed Zuckerman	May 11, 1994	69011	15.3
Briscoe and Logan investigate the disappearance of Wendy Sylvester from her abusive foster home, and find her being held by Arnette Fenady, a loving but disturbed woman who insists she has acted only for the child's own good. Guest starring: Christine Baranski, Lisa Eichhorn, Camryn Manheim, Bruce MacVittie, Zelda Harris, Sondra James, Adina Porter, Danny Tamberelli
87	21	"Doubles"	Ed Sherin	Michael S. Chernuchin & René Balcer	May 18, 1994	69001	15.7
An assailant breaks the wrist of tennis player, Korey Burke, prior to a tournament, and a competitor is among the suspects. Guest starring: John Heard, Leslie Lyles, Peter Jacobson, Mary McCormack
88	22	"Old Friends"	James Quinn	S : Robert Nathan; S/T : Joshua Stern	May 25, 1994	69031	15.3
A truck hits a pedestrian and the investigation reveals Steven Green, the victim's link to a baby-food company where a new partner has connections to the Russian mob. Cast: Final appearance of Michael Moriarty as Executive Assistant District Attorney Ben Stone. Guest starring: Allison Janney, Victor Slezak, Geoff Pierson, Michael Harney, Brian Tarantina, Don Creech, Michael Gaston, Scott MacDonald, Elizabeth Rodriguez, Bob Dishy
