= Dominic Rowan =

British actor

- Born: 17 June 1970 (age 56); Oxford, England
- Education: Royal Central School of Speech and Drama
- Occupations: Actor, voice-over artist
- Spouse(s): divorced: ex wife: Francesca Rowan/Rogers, interior designer
- Children: Two sons

Dominic Rowan (born 17 June 1971) is an English television, film and theatre actor. He played CPS prosecutor Jacob Thorne in the ITV crime drama Law & Order: UK and Tom Mitford in the Channel 4 drama series North Square. Rowan has also had an extensive stage career.

== Career ==
Rowan trained at Central School of Speech and Drama.

=== Theatre ===
Rowan's work in theatre includes: A Dream Play, Iphigeneia at Aulis, Mourning Becomes Electra, Three Sisters, The Talking Cure and Private Lives at the National Theatre, London; The Two Gentlemen of Verona, The Merchant of Venice and Talk of the City for the RSC; A Voyage Round My Father and Lobby Hero at the Donmar Warehouse, London; Playhouse Creatures at the Old Vic, London; Way to Heaven and Forty Winks at the Royal Court Theatre, London; The Importance of Being Earnest at The Oxford Playhouse; Sexual Perversity in Chicago at the Crucible Theatre, Sheffield; The Rivals, Charley's Aunt and Look Back in Anger at the Royal Exchange, Manchester; A Collier's Friday Night at Hampstead Theatre, London; Wit's End at the New End Theatre, London, and Happy Now?, a new play by Lucinda Coxon at the National Theatre, London.

He was seen in David Eldridge's Under The Blue Sky, which ran from July to September 2008 at the Duke of York's Theatre, London, then from December 2009 in Martin Crimp's version of Molière's comedy The Misanthrope at the Comedy Theatre, London. In summer 2009, he appeared as Touchstone in Shakespeare's As You Like It at the Globe Theatre, where he also appeared in the title role of Henry VIII in 2010. In July 2011 he appeared at the Royal Court alongside Romola Garai in The Village Bike.

In 2012 he appeared as Torvald in Henrik Ibsen's A Doll's House at the Young Vic and in Berenice by Jean Racine at the Donmar Warehouse. In March 2024 Rowan appeared alongside Rachael Stirling in The Divine Mrs S. at the Hampstead Theatre, and in summer 2025 he appeared alongside Claire Price, Daniel Abelson and Joe Edgar in Terence Rattigan's In Praise of Love at the Orange Tree Theatre, Richmond.

=== Television ===
His TV credits include: Catwalk Dogs, Baby Boom, Midsomer Murders, Trial & Retribution, Family Man, The Lavender List, Celeb, Silent Witness, Swallow, Doc Martin, A Rather English Marriage, Saint X, Holby City, Rescue Me, Lost World, North Square, Hearts and Bones, Emma, The Tenant of Wildfell Hall, No Bananas, Devil's Advocate and Between the Lines. In 2011, Rowan joined the cast of Law & Order: UK, replacing Ben Daniels as the show's Crown Prosecutor Jacob Thorne. He joined the new "order" team of Freema Agyeman and Peter Davison. He also joined the cast of the fourth series of The Crown on Netflix in 2020, as Charles Powell.

=== Film ===
Rowan's film appearances include: David, The Tulse Luper Suitcases and the short film Pressure Points. In September 2011 Rowan played the title role in NCM Fathom/Globe Theatre/Arts Alliance Media film presentation of Shakespeare's Henry VIII – filmed during live performances at the Globe Theatre in London.

=== Radio ===
His radio work includes: Number 10, And the Rain My Drink, The Talk of the City and The Mill on the Floss.
