= Law & Order season 7 =

Season of American television series

Law & Order
- Season 7
- Season 7 U.S. DVD cover
- Starring: Jerry Orbach; Benjamin Bratt; S. Epatha Merkerson; Sam Waterston; Carey Lowell; Steven Hill
- No. of episodes: 23

Release
- Original network: NBC
- Original release: September 18, 1996 – May 21, 1997

Season chronology
- ← Previous; Season 6 Next → Season 8

The following is a list of Law & Order episodes from the series' seventh season (1996–1997): During the seventh season, Law & Order was becoming more popular on television and was NBC's 2nd most-popular drama; however, the ratings were usually half the size of the network's hit drama ER. NBC decided to give Law & Order some additional promotion by airing a three-episode story arc on Thursday nights at 10pm ET instead of ER reruns. Ratings for all three episodes were strong and helped establish the show on NBC's schedule for years to come. Episode 152 "Mad Dog" was supposed to air on a Thursday night as well, but NBC moved Law & Order back to Wednesdays at 10pm ET. The season won the Emmy for Outstanding Drama Series.

== Cast ==
Jamie Ross (played by Carey Lowell) replaced season 6's Claire Kincaid (Jill Hennessy) in the role of Assistant District Attorney. The resulting ensemble cast was the most stable in the history of the Law & Order series up to this point, remaining unchanged for two seasons and 47 episodes.

=== Main ===
- Jerry Orbach as Senior Detective Lennie Briscoe
- Benjamin Bratt as Junior Detective Rey Curtis
- S. Epatha Merkerson as Lieutenant Anita Van Buren
- Sam Waterston as Executive Assistant District Attorney Jack McCoy
- Carey Lowell as Assistant District Attorney Jamie Ross
- Steven Hill as District Attorney Adam Schiff

=== Recurring ===
- Carolyn McCormick as Dr. Elizabeth Olivet
- Leslie Hendrix as M.E. Dr. Elizabeth Rodgers
- John Fiore as Detective Tony Profaci

=== Guest ===
- David Zayas as Raoul Cervantes
- John Doman as Sgt. Frank Gottlieb
- Tovah Feldshuh as Defense Attorney Danielle Melnick
- Jack Gilpin as Defense Attorney Mr. Axtell

== Episodes ==
No. overall	No. in season	Title	Directed by	Written by	Original release date	Prod. code	U.S. viewers (millions)
135	1	"Causa Mortis"	Ed Sherin	René Balcer	September 18, 1996	K1106	15.7
McCoy's new second chair, ADA Jamie Ross, is determined to prosecute, as harshly as possible, a carjacker who took the life of Maureen Rankin, a teacher, as she pleaded for her life on an audio tape discovered at the crime scene. Cast: First appearance of Carey Lowell as Assistant District Attorney Jamie Ross. Guest starring: David Zayas as Raoul Cervantes. Note: Based on the murder of New Jersey schoolteacher Kathleen Weinstein in Toms River.
136	2	"I.D."	Constantine Makris	Ed Zuckerman	September 25, 1996	K1107	16.5
The cops tackle identifying a corpse left in an elevator, and McCoy finds his prosecution of the suspect later hampered by the vindictive Judge Nathan Marks who resents Ross's in-court rebuke for sexual harassment. Guest starring: Jerry Adler as Judge Nathan Marks
137	3	"Good Girl"	Jace Alexander	Jeremy R. Littman	October 2, 1996	K1103	14.5
Briscoe and Curtis have to break the mutual alibi of two girlfriends as they try to find the killer of Charlie Monroe, a young black man. His angry parents pressure McCoy to indict Danielle Mason, a young woman who claims the victim had raped her.
138	4	"Survivor"	Vincent Misiano	Barry M. Schkolnick	October 16, 1996	K1104	15.5
Briscoe and Curtis's investigation of the murder of Steven Campbell, a rare coin dealer, nets them a millionaire as a suspect. But Ross has to play detective too as the DA's office tries to establish a provenance for the missing coin collection.
139	5	"Corruption"	Matthew Penn	S : René Balcer; S/T : Gardner Stern	October 23, 1996	K1101	16.2
Curtis, angered by the attitude of John Flynn, an old colleague of Briscoe, looks beyond the findings of an IAB investigation and turns up evidence of police corruption. This puts the DA's office into competition with an ambitious judge. Flynn angrily accuses Briscoe of stealing evidence from a police lockup.
140	6	"Double Blind"	Christopher Misiano	Jeremy R. Littman & William N. Fordes	October 30, 1996	K1105	15.22
The murder of Greg Franklin, a janitor from a university laboratory building, leads back to a student Alan Sawyer, a lab employee whose participation in a drug study may have prompted the crime.
141	7	"Deadbeat"	Constantine Makris	Ed Zuckerman & I.C. Rapoport	November 6, 1996	K1108	14.9
The murder of Michael Malone, a deadbeat father whose son is dying of leukemia, presents McCoy and Ross with a sympathetic suspect and a moral dilemma. Guest starring: Tamara Tunie as Defense Attorney Caroline Bennett. Note: Tunie went on to portray Medical Examiner Dr. Melinda Warner in Law & Order: Special Victims Unit.
142	8	"Family Business"	Lewis H. Gould	Gardner Stern & Barry M. Schkolnick	November 13, 1996	K1111	14.0
The murder of Richard Speigel, chief financial officer for an exclusive, family-owned department store goes from the sitting room to the bedroom and into the board room as suspicion shifts from co-workers to family members.
143	9	"Entrapment"	Matthew Penn	René Balcer & Richard Sweren	November 20, 1996	K1109	13.23
The case against Huey Tate, a young man accused of shooting Roland Brooks the well-known leader of the African-American Congress, comes undone when the New York authorities learn that their chief witness was once an informant for the FBI, and is still under their protection. Guest starring: Michelle Hurd as Angela Roney. Notes: Hurd went on to portray Detective Monique Jeffries in Law & Order: Special Victims Unit. This episode revisits the assassination of Marcus Tate from the season 3 episode "Conspiracy".
144	10	"Legacy"	Brian Mertes	Ed Zuckerman & Jeremy R. Littman	November 27, 1996	K1113	15.06
The investigation of the seemingly random shooting of James Shepherd leads Briscoe and Curtis to a brazen, cold-blooded hitman, and the only way to bring him down is for Briscoe to pose as his competition. The case is complicated during trial when it is revealed that the victim was shot as revenge for a murder he committed himself just five years ago.
145	11	"Menace"	Constantine Makris	S : Barry M. Schkolnick; S/T : I.C. Rapoport	December 11, 1996	K1114	14.97
An apparent suicide turns out to be murder as Briscoe and Curtis investigate the death of Karen Marsh a woman, who jumped from a bridge (in front of numerous bystanders) to avoid a crazed attacker with whom she was apparently involved in a fender-bender. When they are unable to convict, McCoy and Ross dig deeper and discover that the 'accident' might not have been so accidental after all. Meanwhile, Curtis is booted from his house after admitting to his wife that he cheated on her.
146	12	"Barter"	Dan Karlok	René Balcer & Eddie Feldmann	January 22, 1997	K1110	14.80
An unpromising case of murder suddenly develops new leads when the cops explore the possibility that the victim Shelley Ganz was mistaken for someone else. McCoy walks a thin line in the matter of ethical conduct as he tries to make a case against a lender who uses unscrupulous methods to collect the money owed to him.
147	13	"Matrimony"	Lewis H. Gould	Ed Zuckerman & Richard Sweren	February 5, 1997	K1115	13.14
The discovery of a would-be thief refocuses a murder investigation, leaving the prosecutors the task of making a conspiracy case against the deceased's attorney and the pretty young widow.
148	14	"Working Mom"	Jace Alexander	Jeremy R. Littman & I.C. Rapoport	February 12, 1997	K1118	15.02
The shooting of Gilbert “Gilly” Keene, an ex-cop, in a neighborhood notorious for prostitution leads Briscoe and Curtis to two suburban housewives who are secretly high-class hookers. When one of the housewife's specialty lipstick is matched to a lipstick sample taken from a very private spot on the victim, it seems like McCoy has an open and shut case. However, the accused soon claims rape and hires a famous women's rights attorney to defend her.
149	15	"D-Girl"	Ed Sherin	René Balcer & Ed Zuckerman & Gardner Stern	February 19, 1997	K1119	19.76
A headless corpse fished out of the river sends Briscoe and Curtis out to Los Angeles to obtain a blood sample from their chief suspect. Back in New York, McCoy and Ross try to obtain a court order for the procedure.
150	16	"Turnaround"	Ed Sherin	René Balcer & Ed Zuckerman & Gardner Stern	February 26, 1997	K1120	18.08
In New York, Briscoe and Curtis try to pin down the suspect's schedule on the night of the murder, but find instead that another man was in the area at the right time and more importantly, might have a motive for the crime. After a new arrest warrant is issued, McCoy and Ross have to fly to L.A. to defend their warrant against attacks by the man's defense counsel, Ross's former husband Neal Gorton.
151	17	"Showtime"	Ed Sherin	René Balcer & Ed Zuckerman & Gardner Stern	March 19, 1997	K1121	17.07
The trial of Eddie Newman begins but the prosecution's chances of conviction are hampered by a "dream team" of defense attorneys, Gorton's personal pressures on Ross, and a surprise accusation of sexual harassment. Curtis' relationship with Lisa also creates tension.
152	18	"Mad Dog"	Christopher Misiano	René Balcer	March 26, 1997	K1116	14.88
McCoy pushes the police perilously close to harassment as he tries to link a recently paroled serial rapist Lewis Darnell to a new fatal rape. Note: Sam Waterston was nominated for an Outstanding Lead Actor in a Drama Series Emmy for his performance in this episode.
153	19	"Double Down"	Arthur W. Forney	S : Richard Sweren; T : Ed Zuckerman; S/T : Shimon Wincelberg	April 23, 1997	K1122	14.62
The cops' best hope of finding a kidnapped hired car driver alive is one of the armed robbers who grabbed him after a job, but the immunity deal he demands in return would effectively preclude his prosecution for the shooting death of an off-duty cop, placing McCoy in a difficult position as he seeks to placate the cops, who want the guy prosecuted, and the kidnapped man's wife, who wants every avenue of saving her husband explored.
154	20	"We Like Mike"	David Platt	Gardner Stern & I.C. Rapoport	April 30, 1997	K1125	13.37
A young man, Mike Bodak, who claims to have helped a murdered young man, Matthew Sherman, change a flat tire, is first the cops' primary suspect, then the prosecutors' chief witness.
155	21	"Passion"	Constantine Makris	S : Richard Sweren; S/T : Barry M. Schkolnick	May 7, 1997	K1124	13.06
Briscoe and Curtis investigate the death of Joan Timberman, a pretty young book editor who was reputedly having an affair with one of her authors, and find themselves focusing on the author's longtime companion, who steadfastly denies there was anything wrong with their relationship.
156	22	"Past Imperfect"	Christopher Misiano	Janis Diamond	May 14, 1997	K1112	13.42
The cops have a definite clue when a bloodstain that is not the same as the victim's reveals that the killer was a blood relative, and the prosecutors stumble when their chief suspect claims their chief witness is her lawyer, and his knowledge of the crime represents privileged communications.
157	23	"Terminal"	Constantine Makris	René Balcer & Ed Zuckerman	May 21, 1997	K1102	14.88
The cops uncover a man with a secret second life as they try to learn who opened fire on a group of people disembarking from a party cruise, but his guilt or innocence becomes almost a second thought as Adam Schiff goes toe-to-toe with the governor and the state's Attorney General over the decision to seek the death penalty. Meanwhile, Schiff learns his wife has been rushed to Cedar's Hospital after suffering a severe stroke rendering her unconscious. Guest starring: Jack Gilpin as Defense Attorney Mr. Axtell.
