= Law & Order: UK =

British police procedural television series

- Genre: Police procedural; Legal drama
- Created by: Dick Wolf
- Written by: Various
- Directed by: Various
- Starring: Bradley Walsh; Jamie Bamber; Harriet Walter; Ben Daniels; Freema Agyeman; Bill Paterson; Dominic Rowan; Peter Davison; Paul Nicholls; Paterson Joseph; Georgia Taylor; Ben Bailey Smith; Sharon Small
- Opening theme: Law & Order London Theme
- Ending theme: Law & Order London Theme
- Composer: Andy Price
- Country of origin: United Kingdom
- Original language: English
- No. of series: 8
- No. of episodes: 53 (list of episodes)

Production
- Executive producers: Chris Chibnall; Bradley Walsh; Andrew Woodhead; Stephen Garrett; Dick Wolf; Jane Featherstone
- Producers: Richard Stokes (series 1–6); Jane Hudson (series 7); Jane Dauncey (series 8)
- Production locations: London, United Kingdom
- Running time: 45–48 mins (without adverts)
- Production companies: Kudos; Wolf Entertainment; Universal International Studios

Original release
- Network: ITV
- Release: 23 February 2009 – 11 June 2014

Related
- Law & Order (franchise)

Law & Order: UK (stylised as Law & Order | UK) is a British police procedural and legal television programme broadcast from 2009 to 2014 on ITV, adapted from the American series Law & Order. Financed by the production companies Kudos Film and Television, Wolf Films, and Universal Television, the series originally starred Bradley Walsh, Freema Agyeman, Jamie Bamber, Ben Daniels, Harriet Walter and Bill Paterson. Dominic Rowan, Georgia Taylor, Paul Nicholls, Ben Bailey Smith, Sharon Small, Peter Davison and Paterson Joseph joined the cast in later series. This is the first American drama television series to be adapted for British television, while the episodes are adapted from scripts and episodes of the parent series.

Series 1 was broadcast in 2009. In June 2014, broadcaster ITV and producer Kudos issued a joint press release announcing that series 8 would be "the last to be transmitted for the foreseeable future."

== Premise ==
In the criminal justice system, the people are represented by two separate yet equally important groups: the police who investigate crime, and the Crown Prosecutors who prosecute the offenders. These are their stories.

— Opening narration spoken by Robert Glenister.

Law & Order: UK is a British adaptation of the American television series Law & Order, one of the most successful brands in American primetime television. Law & Order: UK is based in London and duplicates the episode format of the original series but with appropriate modifications to more closely resemble the English legal system.

The first half of each episode focuses on the perpetration of a crime and the related police investigation, typically culminating in an arrest. The second half follows the legal and court proceedings in an effort to convict the suspect. The show dwells little on the characters' back-stories or social lives, focusing mainly on their lives at work.

The opening narration is largely the same as that of the American series, but replaces "district attorneys" with "crown prosecutors".

=== The police segment ===
For most of Law & Order: UK's run, the lead-in of the show began with the discovery of a crime, usually a murder. The scene typically begins with a slice of everyday life in London, perhaps in a fish and chip shop or Indian takeaway. Some civilians would then discover the crime victim, or sometimes the crime would occur in a public place with civilians as victims or witnesses.

The police are represented in the show by Metropolitan Police Service Murder Investigation Unit (referred to as MIU), with two Criminal Investigation Department (CID) detectives, both detective sergeants (DSs), who report directly to their boss, a detective inspector (DI) or detective chief inspector (DCI). During the preliminary crime scene examination, the detectives make their first observations, form initial theories, and engage in witty banter before the title sequence begins.

The detectives often have few or no good clues, and might not even know the victim's identity, but must usually chase several dead ends before finding a likely suspect. They begin by collecting evidence at the crime scene, often receiving a briefing from scenes of crime officers (SOCOs) who have already conducted a preliminary investigation. They visit the forensic pathologist for information about cause and time of death, or about the victim's identity from dental records or fingerprints. The police will also inform relatives, interview witnesses, and trace the victim's last known movements by talking to the victim's family, friends, co-workers, or known associates. They will visit the crime laboratory for evidence such as fingerprints, DNA and ballistics results. They will receive information from colleagues who have checked the financial and criminal records of both victims and suspects. In some instances, psychologists or psychiatrists are called in for insight into the criminal's personality, behaviour or modus operandi. The detectives then report to their commanding officer who advises or directs them on how best to proceed. For example, when suspects have been identified, the commanding officer decides if there is enough for a search or arrest warrant, perhaps after consulting the CPS office to see if the case is strong enough; and whether any back-up from uniformed officers or armed police is needed. The detectives will then arrest the suspects, sometimes after a chase through the streets of London. The scene then shifts to the interrogation room where the detectives interview the suspect(s) until the latter request(s) a solicitor, who then arrives to typically advise the suspect to remain silent; and then from the interrogation room to the offices of the Crown Prosecution Service, where crown prosecutors decide if they have enough to press charges.

=== The trial segment ===
Towards the middle of a show, the police will begin to work with the prosecutors to make the arrest, though sometimes the CPS team will on occasion appear early on to arrange a plea-for-information deal or to decide if the detectives have enough evidence for search warrants and/or arrest warrants before arresting the suspect or suspects and an arraignment scene will follow.

The matter then is taken over by a pair of crown prosecutors, a crown prosecutor sometimes referred to as a chief crown prosecutor and a crown prosecutor sometimes referred to as a crown advocate from the London office of the Crown Prosecution Service. They discuss deals, prepare the witnesses and evidence, and conduct the Crown's case in the trial. The crown prosecutors work together and with the coroner's office, the crime laboratory (including fingerprint analysts, DNA profilers and Ballistics analysts), and psychologists and/or psychiatrists (if the defendant uses an insanity plea) all of whom may be needed to testify in court for the prosecution. The police may also reappear to testify in court or to arrest another suspect, but most investigation in the second segment is done by the CPS office, who always consult with the local London CPS Director for advice on the case. If the case is very weak then the police would re-investigate.

Unlike many legal dramas (e.g. Kavanagh QC and Rumpole of the Bailey), the court proceedings are shown from the prosecution's point of view, with the regular characters trying to prove the defendant's guilt, not innocence. The prosecution usually opens with the arraignment of defendants and proceeds to trial preparation, including legal research and plea negotiations. Some episodes include legal proceedings beyond the testimony of witnesses, including motion hearings (often concerning admissibility of evidence); jury selection; and allocutions, usually as a result of plea bargains. Many episodes employ motions to suppress evidence as a plot device, and most of these end with evidence or statements being suppressed, often on a technicality. This usually begins with the service of the motion to the CPS team, follows with argument and case citations of precedent before a judge in court, and concludes with visual reaction of the winning or losing attorney. In some episodes, the audience may not explicitly see the final verdict of the trial or outcomes of any ensuing legal agreements. If the CPS loses a case against a defendant, the episode may occasionally show the CPS pursuing additional charges against the said defendant.

Many episodes use outlandish defence scenarios such as diminished responsibility (e.g. "genetics"/"television"/"God"/"the devil made me do it" and intoxication defence) and temporary insanity (e.g. "black rage"/"white rage"/"sports rage"). Some episodes revolve around moral and ethical debates, including the right to die (euthanasia), the right to life (abortion) and the right to bear arms (gun control). The episode usually ends with the verdict being read by the jury foreperson and a shot of both the winning and losing parties. The scene then shifts to the Crown Prosecution Service's London office where the team is leaving the office to go home while contemplating either the true guilt of the accused, the defence scenarios they used or the moral or ethical debate of the episode.

== Conception ==
One of the distinguishing features of Law & Order is a black-and-white intertitle card, which gives the description of the time, date and setting of each scene. This intertitle is the first title from "Care".

Law & Order: UK was first imagined by franchise creator Dick Wolf in 2000; however, at the time, no network was willing to pick up a pilot for the series. Wolf managed to attract scriptwriter Chris Chibnall, who had previously worked on British productions Torchwood, Life on Mars and Born and Bred, to write a series of 13 adaptations from the original Law & Order series. Wolf then asked Chibnall to look through the Law & Order Bible, a book released in the United States containing a collection of synopses for every episode. Chibnall picked 13 episodes that could be adapted for British television, watched the originals on DVD, and then wrote the adaptations to accommodate contractual requirements with production company Kudos, and to build on the show's reputation of successful storytelling. Subsequently, the series was picked up by ITV. One of the episodes Chibnall adapted, however, had to be scrapped because of incompatibility with English law, resulting in a different episode being adapted. Wolf then attracted producer Richard Stokes to the series, but he stated that a 13-episode series would be too long for broadcast on British television, and thus, he separated the 13 scripts into two separate series. Wolf, however, objected to this, claiming that it wouldn't be an issue, as each series in the United States contains 22 episodes per series. Wolf pushed ITV for more episodes per series, but his attempt was unsuccessful. Each of the 13 scripts was updated for contemporariness, and while the difficulties of adapting the scripts for the English legal system exceeded the expectations of the production team, Stokes opined that audiences familiar with both shows would enjoy them for their distinctions. Further series have continued to adapt scripts from the original Law & Order series. Many of the familiar hallmarks of the original Law & Order series were carried through into the adaptation, including the styling of the opening music, black-and-white intertitles, using Wolf's signature "clanging cell door" sound, and hand-held camera work. Stokes later expressed his praise for the Kudos' method of guerrilla filming on the streets of London. Wolf later described the biggest difference between the two series as the wigs, claiming: "The law is not really that dissimilar and, you know, murder is murder."

== Cast changes ==
In August 2012, ITV announced that they had renewed the show for a six-episode seventh series. Due to other commitments, neither Harriet Walter nor Freema Agyeman returned, and they were replaced by Paterson Joseph and Georgia Taylor in the roles of Detective Inspector Wes Layton and Crown Prosecutor Kate Barker respectively. On 27 February 2013, it was confirmed that Paul Nicholls who plays Detective Sergeant Sam Casey would be leaving the series in the sixth episode of Series 7. On 8 April 2014, it was confirmed that Paterson Joseph would be leaving the series, with his character to be killed in episode 7 of series 8. He was replaced by Sharon Small as DI Elizabeth Flynn in episode 8. On 3 June 2014, ITV confirmed that Bradley Walsh had declined a contract option to return for a ninth series; simultaneously the show was retired indefinitely.

== Series ==
=== Series 1 (2009) ===
The first series of Law & Order: UK starred Bradley Walsh, Jamie Bamber and Harriet Walter, Ben Daniels, Freema Agyeman and Bill Paterson. Each commission consisted of six-seven episodes. Series one was broadcast in February 2009 and concluded in April 2009, with seven episodes being broadcast. The second series followed in January 2010 and consisted of six episodes.

=== Series 2, 3 & 4 (2010) ===
The next three series were all broadcast throughout 2010 with series 2 airing between January and February followed by series 3 between September and October with series 4 airing between November and December. The first major cast departures came at the end of the fourth series, with Ben Daniels and Bill Paterson leaving the show. Walsh, Bamber, Walter, and Agyeman all remained in their roles.

=== Series 5 & 6 (2011) ===
Series 5 introduced two major new cast members in Dominic Rowan as Crown Prosecutor Jacob Thorne and Peter Davison as Henry Sharpe, taking over from Ben Daniels and Bill Paterson respectively. It was also the final series to feature Jamie Bamber, whose character DS Matt Devlin was killed off in the sixth and final episode.

Series 6 introduced Devlin's replacement, DS Sam Casey played by Paul Nicholls. Series 6 was also the last to feature Freema Agyeman as junior prosecutor Alesha Phillips and Harriet Walter as DI Natalie Chandler, though she would later return for the fourth episode of Series 8.

=== Series 7 (2013) ===
The show returned after a longer break between series with a further 7 episodes for its seventh and penultimate series.

This featured two further cast changes with the introduction of Paterson Joseph as DI Wes Layton and Georgia Taylor as junior prosecutor Kate Barker, replacing Harriet Walter and Freema Agyeman, respectively.

It was also the last series to feature Paul Nicholls as DS Sam Casey, who departed in the final episode due to Nicholls having other commitments. He was replaced by Ben Bailey Smith in Series 8.

=== Series 8 (2014) ===
The show returned in the spring of 2014 for an eighth series featuring a final run of eight episodes.

It featured the final major cast change with the introduction of Ben Bailey Smith as DS Joe Hawkins.

In June 2014, ITV announced the show would take an indefinite hiatus with Bradley Walsh opting to quit the show, despite originally having outlined stories for a ninth series.

== Episodes ==
Series	Episodes	Originally released	
Series	Episodes	First released	Last released
1	7	23 February 2009	6 April 2009
2	6	11 January 2010	15 February 2010
3	7	9 September 2010	21 October 2010
4	6	21 March 2011	11 April 2011
5	6	11 July 2011	14 August 2011
6	7	6 January 2012	17 February 2012
7	6	14 July 2013	18 August 2013
8	8	12 March 2014	11 June 2014

In Canada and the United States, for series 1–3, each thirteen-episode run was transmitted as a single series, meaning a total of three seasons had been broadcast as of 2012.

On 30 April 2014, the final episode of series 5 was due to air at 9:00 but was pulled from broadcast hours prior due to the storyline's similarity to the murder of British teacher Ann Maguire in the same week. The episode was instead due to be shown on the later date of 11 June 2014.

== Filming ==
Filming on the first series of Law & Order: UK began in January 2008, and after completion, ITV cutbacks were a concern for cast member Jamie Bamber, who in an interview with Metro, stated, "I think it will [return], but I don't know because as you know there are cutbacks on ITV." However, ITV commissioned a further thirteen episodes, and filming began in the third quarter of 2009. These episodes were subsequently broadcast from 9 September 2010. For the Law part of the series, frequent filming on-location around London takes place, while for the Order part, filming around the exterior of the Old Bailey takes place concurrently on Sundays. Filming of the courtroom interior, police station office and the Crown Prosecution Service office takes place on a specially built set on a disused Ministry of Defence base in Qinetiq, based near the M25 motorway in Surrey. The police station set was specifically designed with an eye for realism; with personal items on each of the desks, and an ironing board and clean shirts being placed around for the eventuality of police officers heading to court. The campus of University College London, including the main quadrangle and the cloisters, was used for the basis of filming for scenes aired in series six.

== Cast ==
The original cast of Law & Order: UK consisted of Bradley Walsh as Sergeant Ronnie Brooks, Jamie Bamber as Sergeant Matt Devlin, and Harriet Walter as Inspector Natalie Chandler, Ben Daniels as Prosecutor James Steel, Freema Agyeman as Solicitor Alesha Phillips, and Bill Paterson as Director George Castle. Bamber was subsequently replaced by Paul Nicholls as Sergeant Sam Casey, and later Ben Bailey-Smith as Sergeant Joe Hawkins, while Walter was succeeded by Paterson Joseph as Inspector Wes Layton, and Sharon Small as Inspector Elisabeth Flynn. Similarly, both Georgia Taylor and Dominic Rowan would succeed Agyeman and Daniels, respectively, as Prosecutors Kate Barker and Jake Thorne, whilst Paterson was succeeded by Peter Davison, as Director Henry Sharpe.

Original cast member Walsh left the cast prior to a potential ninth series, though ITV's decision to place the show on hiatus after the series 8 finale leaves Walsh's departure a moot point, and as such he remains the only actor to appear throughout the entire run of the series.

=== Characters ===
- Ronnie Brooks (Bradley Walsh), is a Detective Sergeant assigned to London's Major Incident Unit. A recovering alcoholic and absent-father, Ronnie values his job more than anything. He lives to see justice served. Ronnie is the light-hearted leader and mentor of his junior partner, and has turned down numerous promotions in order to make a difference on the streets.
- Matt Devlin (Jamie Bamber, series 1–5), is a Detective Sergeant and the junior partner to Ronnie's senior role. Flirtatious, tech-savvy and people-smart, Matt formed strong bonds with both Alesha and Natalie. It was no surprise then, that when he was gunned down outside a court-house, the team were inconsolable.
- Natalie Chandler (Harriet Walter, series 1–6; guest star series 8), is the mother-figure to Ronnie's father-figure and the Senior Investigating Officer at the M.I.U. She departed to care for her mother, who was in the late stages of a terminal disease.
- James Steel QC (Ben Daniels, series 1–4), is a senior crown prosecutor employed by the London CPS.
- Alesha Phillips (Freema Agyeman, series 1–6), is Steel's partner and a junior CPS prosecutor. A tough lawyer raised on the streets of London, Phillips had a flirty relationship with Devlin until his death. She departed the CPS to become a senior prosecutor in Greater Manchester.
- George Castle (Bill Paterson, series 1–4), was the first director of CPS London and the supervisor of Phillips and Steel.
- Jake Thorne (Dominic Rowan, series 5–8), was Phillips second partner, and a senior crown prosecutor.
- Henry Sharpe (Peter Davison, series 5–8), succeeded Castle as the director of CPS London and was the direct supervisor to Thorne and Phillips.
- Sam Casey (Paul Nicholls, series 6–7), is a Detective Sergeant who has worked at M.I.U. for several years. Originally assigned to investigate the death of Devlin, he was partnered with Ronnie on a full-time basis sometime during the subsequent year. He is a part-time dad, and presumably left the force to focus more wholly on the upbringing of his child.
- Kate Barker (Georgia Taylor, series 7–8), replaced Phillips following her promotion. Loud and nosey, Barker was a defence barrister before joining Thorne, making it exceedingly difficult to build a professional relationship upon their adversarial experiences.
- Wes Layton (Paterson Joseph, series 7–8), worked with Ronnie during his days on the beat. Assigned to the MIU temporarily to cover Chandler's leave, but became her permanent replacement shortly thereafter. He was assassinated during series 8 as part of a series of gun-crimes that also targeted Sharpe.
- Joe Hawkins (Ben Bailey Smith, series 8), was Ronnie's third and final partner. A newly promoted DS, he is far more working class than his predecessors and as such possesses greater street smarts. Eager to learn, he's a fresh mind for Ronnie to mould, and he's fiercely loyal.
- Elisabeth Flynn (Sharon Small, series 8) joined the team after she was promoted following an on-the-job injury. Her personal crusade was against knife-crime, making it ironic that that was the first case that fell onto her desk. She sees Ronnie as a dinosaur, and has a deep desire to modernise the police force. She appears only in the final episode of the series.

== Broadcast ==
In the United Kingdom, Law & Order: UK is broadcast on ITV with repeats of the series airing on sister channel ITV3. In Ireland, TV3 broadcasts each episode a day after the British airing, however, the series is billed as Law & Order: London to distinguish itself from the original American series.

In Canada, City began broadcasting the series on 11 June 2009 and in Australia, Network Ten began broadcasting the series in August 2009. It was later moved to 13th Street, which will premiere the fifth season on 4 February 2015.

In the United States, the series began broadcasting on BBC America on 3 October 2010. Series 1–4 were shown back-to-back as were series 5–6. In the United States, series 7 was broadcast as a 6-episode season 4; no date has been announced for the American broadcast of series 8/season 5.

The series also broadcasts in France, Germany, the Netherlands, Belgium and New Zealand.

== Reception ==
Independent writer Robin Jarossi, who attended a special preview of the premiere episode at the British Film Institute in London on 5 February 2009, praised the uniquely British take on the franchise for balancing the new vision while maintaining the proven Law & Order formula. Jarossi specifically extolled the unexpected casting of Bradley Walsh, the excellent use of their London backdrop, and Chibnall's adaptation of the show. John Boland of the Irish Independent compared Law & Order: UK to the original, ultimately deciding that the former is just as engrossing as the latter, if its tone is slightly more jocular. Boland expects ITV "has a winner on its hands." Andrew Billen from The Times expects the series to be successful based on the premiere episode, and TV Times said that "those concerned can give themselves a pat on the back because this really, really works." The Daily Express' Matt Baylis described the new series as "a breath of fresh air", and the Daily Mirror said "It's all highly professional and heroic."

Variety magazine called the series a hit, quoting NBC Universal as saying, "Law & Order has won its slot every week and is actually increasing its ratings." While Radio Times reviewer Alison Graham felt the series' execution was adequate, she criticised its pacing and writing; the former for not matching that of the original Law & Order programmes, and the latter for "falling headfirst into a typically British legal-drama trap of the noble prosecutor, crusading to bring the guilty to justice while pitted against the louche, self-serving defence barrister." Whereas, on the other hand, The Guardian's Sarah Dempster didn't feel that using the original series' camera work and stylings was appropriate for British crime drama: "Fiddly. And wrong." However, later on in the series' run The Observer's Kathryn Flytt writes that despite her initial prejudices, the series "seems to have absorbed the pace and energy of the original without looking too tricksily derivative". In Australia, Melinda Houston commented favourably in The Age on the show's opening series, opining that the fusion between British crime drama and the American Law & Order franchise is like "a match made in Heaven." The premiere episode which aired on 12 August 2009, only rated 775,000 viewers, and was outside the top 15 rated shows for that period.

Barrister Caroline Haughey, a self-confessed crime junkie, said that Law & Order: UK made her cry:

the relationship between the officers and CPS was reasonably fair; however, the conduct of the Crown Prosecution Advocate in his talking directly to defendants and offering plea bargains was a step too far. Law And Order State Side is excellent, but the translation of that justice system into our own jurisdiction is not really possible – CPS lawyers do NOT invite defendants to CPS HQ, and do not run their own investigation.

== Home releases ==
=== Region 2 ===
DVD Volume	Release Date	Episodes	Additional Features
Series 1 (Episodes 1–7)	11 January 2010	7	Audio Commentary ("Care"); Deleted Scenes; Extended Scenes; Alternate Beginning ("Care"); Summing Up ("Vice"); CPS Set Tour; Interview with Jamie Bamber; Interview with Chris Chibnall; Interview with Bradley Walsh; Interview with Dick Wolf
Series 2 (Episodes 8–13)	22 February 2010	6	Audio Commentaries ("Samaritan", "Honour Bound"); Deleted Scenes; Extended Scenes; Police Set Tour; Interview with Harriet Walter; Interview with Richard Stokes; Interview with Robert Glenister
Series 3 (Episodes 14–20)	7 March 2011	7	Audio Commentary ("Masquerade"); From Dawn 'Til Dusk: Featurette
Series 4 (Episodes 21–26)	11 July 2011	6	Audio Commentary ("Help"); Gag Reel
Series 1–4 (Episodes 1–26)	11 July 2011	26	Interview with Freema Agyeman; Interview with Ben Daniels; Interview with Bill Paterson; Interview with Harriet Walter; Interview with Jamie Bamber; Interview with Bradley Walsh; Interview with Richard Stokes; Wardrobe Tour with Freema Agyeman; Tour of Court Set with Freema Agyeman
Series 5 (Episodes 27–32)	6 February 2012	6	Interview with Dominic Rowan; Interview with Freema Agyeman; Interview with Peter Davison
Series 6 (Episodes 33–39)	2 April 2012	7	Interview with Bradley Walsh; Interview with Paul Nicholls; Interview with Harriet Walter; Interview with Richard Stokes
Series 7 (Episodes 40–45)	7 October 2013	6	Behind the Scenes of the Train Crash

The final Series 8 (Episodes 46 to 53) has not been released on DVD since transmission in 2014.

=== Region 1 ===
DVD title	Release date	Episodes	Additional information
Season One (Episodes 1–13)	26 October 2010	13	Audio Commentaries ("Care", "Samaritan" & "Honour Bound"); Deleted Scenes; Extended Scenes; Alternate Beginning ("Care"); Summing Up ("Vice"); CPS Set Tour; Police Set Tour; Interview with Jamie Bamber; Interview with Chris Chibnall; Interview with Bradley Walsh; Interview with Dick Wolf; Interview with Harriet Walter; Interview with Richard Stokes; Interview with Robert Glenister
Season Two (Episodes 14–26)	22 November 2011	13	Audio Commentaries ("Masquerade" & "Help"); From Dawn 'Till Dusk: Featurette; Gag Reel
