= Law & Order season 2 =

Season of American television series

Law & Order
- Season 2
- Season 2 U.S. DVD cover
- Starring: Paul Sorvino; Chris Noth; Dann Florek; Michael Moriarty; Richard Brooks; Steven Hill
- No. of episodes: 22

Release
- Original network: NBC
- Original release: September 17, 1991 – May 12, 1992

Season chronology
- ← Previous; Season 1 Next → Season 3

The second season of Law & Order aired on NBC between September 17, 1991, and May 12, 1992. This season marked the first death of a main character, as George Dzundza had departed the series after the conclusion of the first season. The death of his character Max Greevey is shown in the season premiere. Carolyn McCormick makes her first recurring appearance as Dr. Elizabeth Olivet.

== Cast and characters ==
Phil Cerreta (played by Paul Sorvino) replaced season 1's Max Greevey (George Dzundza) in the role of senior detective. The cast was otherwise unchanged.

Jerry Orbach made his initial appearance in the series in the episode "The Wages of Love", playing defense attorney Frank Lehrman; he would become a member of the principal cast beginning the next season after Paul Sorvino left, playing Senior Detective Sergeant Phil Cerreta’s replacement Senior Detective Lennie Briscoe, and remain with the show for twelve seasons.

=== Main ===
- Paul Sorvino as Detective Sergeant Phil Cerreta
- Chris Noth as Detective Mike Logan
- Dann Florek as Captain Donald Cragen
- Michael Moriarty as Executive Assistant District Attorney Ben Stone
- Richard Brooks as Assistant District Attorney Paul Robinette
- Steven Hill as District Attorney Adam Schiff

=== Recurring ===
- Tanya Berezin as Trial Judge Rosalyn Lenz
- Susan Blommaert as Trial Judge Rebecca Steinman
- Joan Copeland as Trial Judge Rebecca Stein
- Donald Corren as Forensic Technician Medill
- Christine Farrell as Forensic Technician Arlene Shrier
- Tovah Feldshuh as Defense Attorney Danielle Melnick
- John Fiore as Detective Tony Profaci
- Sam Gray as Trial Judge Manuel Leon
- George Grizzard as Defense Attorney Arthur Gold
- Ben Hammer as Trial Judge Herman Mooney
- Leslie Hendrix as Medical Examiner Dr. Elizabeth Rodgers
- David Lipman as Arraignment Judge Morris Torledsky
- Carolyn McCormick as Dr. Elizabeth Olivet
- Bernie McInerney as Trial Judge Michael Callahan
- Joanna Merlin as Defense Attorney Carla Bowman
- John Ramsey as Trial Judge Walter Schreiber
- David Rosenbaum as Trial Judge Alan Berman
- Fred J. Scollay as Trial Judge Andrew Barsky
- Roger Serbagi as Trial Judge Robert Quinn
- Barbara Spiegel as Arraignment Judge Harriet Doremus
- Richard Venture as Defense Attorney Douglas Greer

== Episodes ==
No. overall	No. in season	Title	Directed by	Written by	Original release date	Prod. code	U.S. viewers (millions)
23	1	"Confession"	Fred Gerber	Michael Duggan & Robert Palm	September 17, 1991	67416	16.4
Logan forces a confession at gunpoint from Daniel Magadan Jr. the man suspected of murdering Max Greevey and, in the process, endangers Stone's prosecution. Logan is also introduced to his new partner, Phil Cerreta, while he speaks to a counselor, Dr. Elizabeth Olivet. Cast: This episode is technically the final appearance of Detective Sergeant Max Greevey, though he only appears from behind and is not played by George Dzundza. Guest starring: Vyto Ruginis, Daniel Von Bargen, Val Avery, Nicolas Coster, Peter Crombie, Joe Mantello
24	2	"The Wages of Love"	Ed Sherin	S : Robert Stuart Nathan; S/T : Ed Zuckerman	September 24, 1991	67405	16.6
A double homicide of Edward Cullen an older man and Alexandria Beckett his younger lover casts suspicion on both the ex-wife Melainie and the former boyfriend Douglas Phillips of the murdered duo, with the murdered man's son Jamie holding the key to the mystery. Guest starring: Shirley Knight, Benjamin Hendrickson, Jerry Orbach, Howard Witt, William Bogert, Catherine Lloyd Burns, Timothy Britten Parker, Keith Diamond, Judith Roberts, Robert Stanton
25	3	"Aria"	Don Scardino	S : Michael S. Chernuchin; T : Christine Roum	October 1, 1991	67411	18.9
A lethal drug overdose of Priscilla Blaine a young actress leads the detectives to an aggressive stage mother Elizabeth and a pornographic movie producer Franklin Frome. Guest starring: Tony Roberts, Maura Tierney, Stephen D. Newman, Lisa Nicole Carson, Maria Pitillo, Lewis Black, Catherine Wolf, Mary Doyle, Lou Martini Jr., Frank Vincent, Jay Goede, Ed Kovens, Schuyler Grant and Vincent Curatola
26	4	"Asylum"	Kristoffer Siegel-Tabori	S : Robert Palm; T : Kathy McCormick	October 8, 1991	67409	20.8
A victim's stabbing death in front of a coffee shop leads to one vagrant testifying against another. But the conviction is threatened twice based on the lack of a search warrant for a suspect's home - first an SRO hotel room and second a lean-to in the park. Guest starring: Matthew Cowles, Ron McLarty, Elizabeth Lawrence, Lycia Naff, Michael Tolan, Jack Wallace, Jane White, William Mesnik, Graham Brown, Dan Grimaldi, Mary Testa, George T. Odom
27	5	"God Bless the Child"	E.W. Swackhamer	David Black & Robert Stuart Nathan	October 22, 1991	67404	15.1
A couple Nancy and Ted Driscoll, whose religious beliefs forbids medical treatment, is on trial for letting their daughter die of strep throat infection. Stone's prosecution hinges on whether either or both of the parents wanted to call for medical help. The investigation uncovers two other pertinent facts: 1. the night of the girl's death, the mother was drinking (also against the couple's religious beliefs), and 2. the couple had another child that died under similar circumstances. Guest starring: Henderson Forsythe, Marian Seldes, James Noble, Caroline Aaron, Kaiulani Lee, Biff McGuire, Kenneth Tigar, Socorro Santiago, Peter Appel, Aleta Mitchell, Keith Randolph Smith
28	6	"Misconception"	Daniel Sackheim	S : Michael Duggan; S/T : Michael S. Chernuchin	October 29, 1991	67410	18.5
The mugging of a pregnant legal secretary leads to a charge against her employer of assault, which is upgraded to murder when she miscarries. Time span confirmation of the baby's conception and the employer-secretary affair eliminates the employer as a suspect. Suspicion shifts to the secretary and her boyfriend Christopher Baylor (a disbarred lawyer) when a wiretap reveals that the couple intended, first, to have the employer held criminally responsible for the baby's murder and, second, to sue the employer for wrongful death. Initially, the primary issue appears to be the fetus age at which a murder charge can be leveled. The primary issue proves to be two-fold; 1. whether the suspects can be held accountable for knowing both the law and its meaning, and 2. even if the suspects cannot legally be convicted of the baby's murder, whether they can be convicted of a lesser crime, i.e. attempted murder. Guest starring: Molly Price, Reed Diamond, Stanley Anderson, Rosemary De Angelis, Shirley Stoler, Yancy Butler, Neal Jones, Kristine Nielsen
29	7	"In Memory Of"	Ed Sherin	S : Siobhan Byrne; T : Robert Stuart Nathan; S/T : David Black	November 5, 1991	67413	18.1
The renovation of a brownstone uncovers the remains of Tommy Keegan a young boy who disappeared thirty-one years earlier during the 1960 presidential campaign. The discovery revives a wrenching and long-suppressed memory in a childhood friend and neighbor Thad Messimer-and the suspect's daughter Julie Atkinson. Guest starring: Michael Higgins, Mary-Joan Negro, Rosemary Murphy, Tresa Hughes, Richard Hamilton, Colin Fox, Hildy Brooks, Adam LeFevre, Kevin O'Morrison, Gwen Shepherd, Marylouise Burke, Billy Van
30	8	"Out of Control"	John Whitesell	S : David Black & Robert Stuart Nathan; T : Jack Richardson	November 12, 1991	67403	19.3
The detectives investigate the gang rape of Andrea Fermi a college student during a fraternity Halloween party, but when her own testimony can't be supported by the evidence, it becomes hard to prove rape. Guest starring: Cynthia Harris, Brian Tarantina, Geoff Pierson, Joe Grifasi, David Burke, Mark Kiely, Isaiah Washington, Patricia Mauceri, Matthew Arkin, Néstor Carbonell, Bellina Logan, Brad Kane, Star Jasper, Billie Allen, Todd Louiso
31	9	"Renunciation"	Gwen Arner	Michael S. Chernuchin & Joe Morgenstern	November 19, 1991	67414	16.0
When Lawrence Kealey, a gambler, is killed, the hit-and-run investigation leads to the discovery of school teacher Jenna carrying on an affair with one of her students, Roy Pack Jr., Cerreta and Logan suspect that she may have manipulated him into killing her husband. Guest starring: Ashley Crow, Victor Arnold, Sam Coppola, Robert LaSardo, Ben Lang, Donald Corren
32	10	"Heaven"	Ed Sherin	T : Nancy Ann Miller; S/T : Robert Palm	November 26, 1991	67415	19.1
The investigation into an illegal social club fire which claimed 53 fatalities leads to a connection between arson, illegal immigrants and the sale of green cards. Guest starring: Jose Perez, Lisa Emery, Luis Guzmán, Robert Hogan, Phyllis Somerville, Gil Rogers, Bárbara González, Murphy Guyer, Donald Corren, Kim Chan, Mel Gorham: Based on the Happy Land fire.
33	11	"His Hour Upon the Stage"	Steve Cohen	Robert Nathan & Giles Blunt	December 10, 1991	67407	18.3
The discovery of Joshua Foster a frozen corpse in a dumpster leads to rival Broadway producers. Guest starring: Finn Carter, Frank Converse, Alan Feinstein, Alberta Watson, Bruce MacVittie, Mike Starr, Dylan Baker, Tony Darrow, Marilyn Sokol, David Cryer, Walter Bobbie, Larry Block, Renée Lippin, Ron Ostrow
34	12	"Star Struck"	Ed Sherin	S : David Black & Alan Gelb; T : Robert Nathan & Sally Nemeth	January 7, 1992	67406	21.3
An obsessive fan Jesse Unger pleads temporary insanity when he is charged with attempting to murder the soap opera actress Lucy Nevin who is the center of his life. Guest starring: Blanche Baker, Jordan Charney, Lenka Peterson, Werner Klemperer, David Drake, Currie Graham, Allison Janney, Pippin Parker, Julie White, James Colby
35	13	"Severance"	Jim Frawley	S : Michael Duggan; T : Michael S. Chernuchin; S/T : William N. Fordes	January 14, 1992	67418	17.4
Stone faces Arthur Gold an old rival in court as he tries to link a hit man and three murders to a sleazy lawyer and a powerful man behind bars. Guest starring: Maureen Anderman, Sam Groom, J. Smith-Cameron, Rita Gardner, Frank John Hughes, Gareth Williams
36	14	"Blood Is Thicker"	Peter Levin	S : Robert Nathan; S/T : Ed Zuckerman	February 4, 1992	67422	17.6
An apparent mugging ends in the death of Lois Ryder a wealthy woman but the case comes to hang on a silver pin that may have been in the victim's possession. Guest starring: Nancy Marchand, John Bedford Lloyd, Joel Polis, Sam Freed, Kim Hamilton, Nicholas Turturro, Jude Ciccolella, John Heffernan, Nick Sandow, Saul Stein, Frank Muller, Brian Williams, Glenn Taranto, Venida Evans, Stephanie Trudeau, and Steven Martini
37	15	"Trust"	Daniel Sackheim	S : Michael Duggan; S/T : René Balcer	February 11, 1992	67417	17.6
Stone is determined to see that Jamie Maser a teenage boy does not get away with murder twice when the young man is brought to trial for the shooting death of one of his friends. Guest starring: Tom Mason, Michael Constantine, Lizbeth MacKay, Harley Cross, Michael Harney, Will Friedle, Karron Graves, Judd Trichter
38	16	"Vengeance"	Daniel Sackheim	S : Peter S. Greenberg; T : René Balcer; S/T : Michael S. Chernuchin	February 18, 1992	67420	19.2
The parents of a murdered woman Judy Bream contest Stone's prosecution of her killer Albert Lawrence Cheney so that he can be extradited to their home state, where the death penalty still exists. Guest starring: Barbara Barrie, Allen Garfield, Rutanya Alda, Jay Patterson, Steve Ryan, James Rebhorn, Melinda Mullins, Matt Malloy
39	17	"Sisters of Mercy"	Fred Gerber	S : Robert Palm; S/T : René Balcer	March 3, 1992	67423	16.4
Cerreta and Logan investigate the accusation that a nun sister in charge of a shelter for teens molested a young addict. Guest starring: Kate Burton, William H. Macy, Kelli Williams, Judy Reyes, LaTanya Richardson Jackson, Vincent Laresca, Aideen O'Kelly
40	18	"Cradle to Grave"	James Frawley	Robert Nathan & Sally Nemeth	March 31, 1992	67424	18.1
The discovery of a dead baby leads to a case involving a slumlord who would not provide any heat and who defends her actions by blaming the rent laws. Guest starring: Tony Lo Bianco, Victor Argo, Karen Lynn Gorney, Richard Bright, Rocco Sisto, Chandra Wilson, Frances Chaney, Elise Neal, Carol Woods, Leonard L. Thomas, Troy Winbush and Irma St. Paule
41	19	"The Fertile Fields"	Ed Sherin	Michael S. Chernuchin & René Balcer	April 7, 1992	67425	17.5
The brutal murder of Ezra Shore a Jewish jeweler appears to be a hate crime, but the investigation soon leads back to the man's brother and his shady business deals. First appearance of Leslie Hendrix as Assistant Chief Medical Examiner Dr. Elizabeth Rodgers. Guest starring: David Spielberg, Tom Mardirosian, Daryl Mitchell, Jerry Stiller, Eddie Korbich, Darien Sills-Evans
42	20	"Intolerance"	Steven Robman	Robert Nathan & Sally Nemeth	April 14, 1992	67426	14.9
When Tim Chong a Chinese-American honors student is killed, the investigation uncovers a racist mother Marian Borland whose son Randy was competing with the victim for the same scholarship. Guest starring: Kelly Bishop, Stephen Pearlman, Lee Wallace, Allelon Ruggiero, Sabrina Lloyd, Rex Robbins, Sam Rockwell, Michael Raynor, Estelle Harris
43	21	"Silence"	Ed Sherin	S : Michael Duggan; T : Michael S. Chernuchin; S/T : René Balcer	April 28, 1992	67427	11.1
A politician opposes the prosecution of his son's murderer because it might mean revealing that his late son James Vogel was gay. Guest starring: George Martin, Reed Birney, Richard Levine, Justine Miceli
44	22	"The Working Stiff"	Daniel Sackheim	S : William N. Fordes; S/T : Robert Palm	May 12, 1992	67428	12.1
The murder of Marshall McFadden a Wall Street legend begins a case involving ailing union worker Simon Vilanis, and Dwight Corcoran, a former governor and old friend of Schiff's. Guest starring: Eli Wallach, George DiCenzo, William Prince, Victor Slezak, Richard Backus, Mia Dillon, Joseph Siravo, Peter Kass, Bobby Alto, Paul Kandel
