= Law & Order season 3 =

Season of American television series

Law & Order
- Season 3
- Season 3 U.S. DVD cover
- Starring: Paul Sorvino; Chris Noth; Dann Florek; Michael Moriarty; Richard Brooks; Steven Hill; Jerry Orbach; Carolyn McCormick
- No. of episodes: 22

Release
- Original network: NBC
- Original release: September 23, 1992 – May 19, 1993

Season chronology
- ← Previous; Season 2 Next → Season 4

The third season of Law & Order aired on NBC between September 23, 1992, and May 19, 1993. This season marked the introduction of Jerry Orbach as Lennie Briscoe, who replaced Paul Sorvino after "Prince of Darkness." A year prior, Orbach had guest starred as a defense attorney in at least one season two episode: “Wages of Love”. At the end of the season, both Dann Florek and Richard Brooks departed the main cast.

== Cast and characters ==
Season 3 began with an unchanged cast. However, during the third and sixth episodes, Carolyn McCormick (as Dr. Elizabeth Olivet) was credited, and starting with the ninth episode, she was credited for the rest of the season. This made her the first woman to be part of the cast in the series.

A third of the way through, Lennie Briscoe (played by Jerry Orbach) replaced Phil Cerreta (Paul Sorvino) as Mike Logan’s partner. This was the first mid-season replacement of a major character in Law & Order's history; the next would not occur until season 15.

This was also the final season to feature Dann Florek as Capt. Don Cragen, and Richard Brooks as Paul Robinette. Both actors would later return in guest roles, with Florek eventually joining the cast of Law & Order: Special Victims Unit.

Eric Bogosian, who guest starred as a defense attorney in the episodes "Conspiracy" and "Night and Fog", would later have a starring role in Law & Order: Criminal Intent.

=== Main ===
- Paul Sorvino as Detective Sergeant Phil Cerreta (Episodes 1–8)
- Chris Noth as Detective Mike Logan
- Dann Florek as Captain Donald Cragen
- Michael Moriarty as Executive Assistant District Attorney Benjamin Stone
- Richard Brooks as Assistant District Attorney Paul Robinette
- Steven Hill as District Attorney Adam Schiff
- Jerry Orbach as Detective Lennie Briscoe (Episodes 9–22)
- Carolyn McCormick as Dr. Elizabeth Olivet (Episodes 9–22)

=== Recurring ===
- Philip Bosco as Defense Attorney Gordon Schell
- Charlotte Colavin as Trial Judge Lisa Pongracic
- Joan Copeland as Trial Judge Rebecca Stein
- Donald Corren as Forensic Technician Medill
- Edie Falco as Defense Attorney Sally Bell
- Christine Farrell as Forensic Technician Arlene Shrier
- Tovah Feldshuh as Defense Attorney Danielle Melnick
- John Fiore as Detective Tony Profaci
- Merwin Goldsmith as Arraignment Judge Ian Feist
- George Grizzard as Defense Attorney Arthur Gold
- Ben Hammer as Trial Judge Herman Mooney
- Leslie Hendrix as Medical Examiner Dr. Elizabeth Rodgers
- David Lipman as Arraignment Judge Morris Torledsky
- Bernie McInerney as Trial Judge Michael Callahan
- Joanna Merlin Defense Attorney Carla Bowman
- Bill Moor as Defense Attorney Bill Patton
- George Murdock as Trial Judge Eric Bertram
- Rochelle Oliver as Trial Judge Grace Larkin
- John Ramsey as Trial Judge Walter Schreiber
- David Rosenbaum as Trial Judge Alan Berman
- Fred J. Scollay as Trial Judge Andrew Barsky
- Roger Serbagi as Trial Judge Robert Quinn
- William Sever as Trial Judge Henry Fillmore
- Barbara Spiegel as Arraignment Judge Harriet Doremus
- Elaine Stritch as Defense Attorney Lanie Stieglitz

=== Guest ===
- Mark Blum as Brooklyn A.D.A. Frank Lazar

== Episodes ==
No. overall	No. in season	Title	Directed by	Written by	Original release date	Prod. code	U.S. viewers (millions)
45	1	"Skin Deep"	Daniel Sackheim	Robert Nathan & Gordon Rayfield	September 23, 1992	68009	14.9
After photographer Julian Decker is found murdered in his studio, Logan and Cerreta discover that Decker's real business was prostitution and acting as a pimp for models who aren't getting the work they needed. Their investigation leads to Angela Brandt, one of Decker's models who found more money working for Decker in other ways, but they also discover that Decker was romantically involved with Angela's teenage daughter. Stone realizes that something strange is going on when the case gets weaker against Angela, but all of a sudden she wants to cut a deal. Guest starring: Alberta Watson, Murphy Guyer, Claire Danes, Maeve McGuire, John Rothman, David Bailey, Gina Torres as Laura Elkin, Yul Vazquez, Lauren Ambrose, Billy Van
46	2	"Conspiracy"	Ed Sherin	Michael S. Chernuchin & René Balcer	September 30, 1992	68006	12.8
After Marcus Tate, the respected leader of a controversial African-American rights movement, is assassinated at a rally, Logan and Cerreta attempt to get information on the crime but are stonewalled by many of Tate's followers, who aren't interested in talking to white police officers. Photographs lead them to Mitchell Kolbin, a white man who had followed Tate religiously but who seemed to lose some of his wonderment when Tate began an affair with his wife. Guest starring: Joe Morton, Michael Jace, Jephté Guillaume, Michael Genet, Kirk Taylor, and Eric Bogosian as Gary Lowenthal.
47	3	"Forgiveness"	Bill D'Elia	S : Robert Nathan; S/T : Ed Zuckerman	October 7, 1992	68005	17.2
After Beth Milgram is found beaten to death in an alleyway after her going away party, Logan and Cerreta initially turn their suspicion to the girl's father after her fiancé, Tommy Beltran, claims that he had hit her after Beth told him they were engaged, but it isn't long before their primary suspect becomes Beltran himself. Stone has the unpleasant task of facing the renowned Cyrus Weaver, who is determined to prove that Tommy Beltran is not guilty of murdering Beth Milgram because he was a poor young man from a Mexican family who could not restrain his rage when his upper-class girlfriend broke up with him. Guest starring: Laurence Luckinbill, Luis Antonio Ramos, Luke Reilly, Richard Holmes, Chris Bauer, Suzanne Cryer, Mara Hobel, Sarah Litzsinger, Boris McGiver. Note: Derived from Bonnie Garland murder case.
48	4	"The Corporate Veil"	Don Scardino	Michael S. Chernuchin & Joe Morgenstern	October 14, 1992	68007	14.8
A teenager's fatal heart attack is traced to fraud and greed on the part of the manufacturer of his pacemaker and their supplier. Guest starring: Dennis Boutsikaris, Bruce Norris, Robert Milli, Elizabeth Hubbard, Michael Lombard, Harriet Sansom Harris, Wendy Barrie-Wilson, Justine Miceli, John Ortiz
49	5	"Wedded Bliss"	Vern Gillum	Robert Nathan & Edward Pomerantz	October 21, 1992	68004	14.8
The discovery of a young woman's body in the river leads to an investigation of illegal sweatshops and the enslavement of young immigrants. Guest starring: Patti D'Arbanville, John Pankow, Bill Raymond, José Zúñiga, Lisa Vidal, Walter Bobbie, Leslie Lyles, Bill Fiore, Vincent Pastore, Glenn Taranto
50	6	"Helpless"	James Frawley	Michael S. Chernuchin & Christine Roum	November 4, 1992	68011	17.5
Dr. Olivet accuses Alex Merritt, her gynecologist, of rape, but Stone finds his case in trouble when he discovers that Olivet tape-recorded the crime. Guest starring: Paul Hecht, Felicity Huffman, Tracey Ellis, Howard Witt, Michele Pawk, Adam Lefevre, Mark Shannon, Ethan Phillips, Janet Ward
51	7	"Self-Defense"	Ed Sherin	René Balcer & Hall Powell	November 11, 1992	68008	14.9
Cerreta and Stone find themselves on opposite sides of the fence when George Costas, a storeowner, kills two robbers and then claims self-defense as a justification. Guest starring: Adam Arkin, Marissa Chibás, Ron Rifkin, Robert Hirschfeld, Jon Manfrellotti, Wai Ching Ho, Paul Schulze, Lou Martini Jr.
52	8	"Prince of Darkness"	Gilbert Shilton	Robert Nathan & William N. Fordes	November 18, 1992	68003	14.6
Cerreta poses as a weapons dealer to help Stone build a case against a Colombian hit man, but the deal takes an unexpected turn, resulting in bloodshed. Guest starring: Rosanna DeSoto, Joe Lisi, Saundra Santiago, Mark Margolis, Shawn Elliott, Jaime Sánchez, Lonny Price, Lizan Mitchell, Carlos Sanz, Gary Perez, Catherine Gardner
53	9	"Point of View"	Gilbert Moses	Walon Green & René Balcer	November 25, 1992	68012	16.4
Logan has trouble dealing with Lennie Briscoe, who has been brought in while Cerreta recovers from surgery during their investigation of the murder of Tommy Duff, a small-time hood. Their investigation leads them to a woman who claims Duff raped her, and when her attorney, an old friend of Stone's from law school, calls Olivet to the stand to testify in Mary Kostrinski's defense, Schiff forces Stone to use Olivet's recent rape (from the episode "Helpless") to discredit her testimony. Logan is upset to learn that Cerreta has accepted another position within the department and will not be returning; at the end of the episode, Logan has no choice but to accept Briscoe as his new partner. Cast: The first appearance of Jerry Orbach as Detective Lennie Briscoe, and the last appearance of Paul Sorvino as Detective Sergeant Phil Cerreta. Guest starring: Lisa Eichhorn, Gary Basaraba, Caroline Aaron, Alan North, Cara Duff-MacCormick, Peter McRobbie, Tony Lip
54	10	"Consultation"	James Hayman	Matt Kiene & Joseph Reinkemeyer	December 9, 1992	68014	13.4
Engineer Phillip Marietta and tribal chief Gimju Nwaka become the chief suspects in the death of Kelani Amoda, a Nigerian woman who died while smuggling heroin internally. Guest starring: Roscoe Lee Browne, Andrew Robinson, Wendell Pierce, Keith Szarabajka, Talia Balsam, Seth Gilliam, Beatrice Winde, Afemo Omilami, Beverly Johnson, Paul Eckstein, Reggie Montgomery, Charles Malik Whitfield, Liz Larsen, Denise Burse and Kwaku Sintim-Misa. Note: This episode was later remade as Law & Order: UK season 2 episode titled "Love and Loss".
55	11	"Extended Family"	Charles Correll	T : Robert Nathan; S/T : Wendell Rawls	January 6, 1993	68015	16.1
When Janet Silver kidnaps her daughter from the mall, Logan and Briscoe are sent in to investigate and learn that she committed the crime with the assistance of a children's help organization after going to them with fears that the little girl's father was sexually abusing her. Guest starring: Barry Primus, Michael McGuire, Brian Markinson, Anna Holbrook, Joyce Van Patten, Matthew Sussman, Madeline Zima, Olga Merediz, Carol Woods
56	12	"Right to Counsel"	James Frawley	Michael S. Chernuchin & Barry M. Schkolnick	January 13, 1993	68019	15.1
After Stone accepts a plea bargain from Steven Gregg the much younger and poorer lover of Barbara Spiegleman a wealthy older woman found murdered in her apartment, he begins to have doubts that he has sent the right man to prison, especially as he learns more about Kevin Doyle the attorney who handled the woman's estate. Guest starring: Mary Mara, Richard Cox, Darrell Larson, Alice Hirson, Thomas Hill, Ted Sorel, Donna Murphy, Floyd Vivino
57	13	"Night and Fog"	Ed Sherin	Michael S. Chernuchin & René Balcer	February 3, 1993	68018	14.6
The confession of an elderly man that he assisted his shoah survivor wife in committing suicide doesn't fully satisfy Stone when evidence surfaces that the man was once a Nazi collaborator. Guest starring: Nehemiah Persoff, Reizl Bozyk, Chip Zien, Diane Venora, Danny Maseng, Bahni Turpin, Beryl Bernay, Paul Schulze
58	14	"Promises to Keep"	Ed Sherin	S : William N. Fordes & Douglas Stark; T : Robert Nathan & Joshua Stern	February 10, 1993	68022	11.4
The investigation into the murder of Jennifer Gorham a young physician leads to the discovery of an unorthodox and illegal relationship between her fiancé and his psychiatrist. Guest starring: Lindsay Crouse, Fritz Weaver, Gail Strickland, Jenny O'Hara, Fred Weller, Robert Sedgwick. Note: This episode was later remade as Law & Order: UK season 4 episode titled "ID".
59	15	"Mother Love"	Daniel Sackheim	S : Walon Green; S/T : Robert Nathan	February 24, 1993	68024	14.6
The absence of a murder weapon complicates the investigation into the murder of Dawn Bryan a drug addict who stole from her family to support her habit. Guest starring: Mary Alice, Kelly Neal, Phyllis Yvonne Stickney, Douglas Turner Ward, Fatima Faloye, Frances Foster, Carl Cofield, Matt Malloy, Paul Schulze
60	16	"Jurisdiction"	Bruce Seth Green	Walon Green & René Balcer	March 3, 1993	68017	N/A
Stone battles the Brooklyn D.A.'s office over prosecutorial jurisdiction in the case of David Zifrin, a mentally handicapped man who confesses to the stabbing deaths of two women. Guest starring: Dan Hedaya, Paul McCrane, Michael Badalucco, Leslie Ayvazian, Paul D'Amato, Amy Ryan, James Colby
61	17	"Conduct Unbecoming"	Arthur W. Forney	S : Walon Green & Peter S. Greenberg; T : Michael S. Chernuchin & René Balcer	March 10, 1993	68023	13.5
Stone and the police battle the closed ranks of the Navy to investigate the death of Tracy Hagen a female Naval officer during a party in a Manhattan hotel. Guest starring: Len Cariou, Boyd Gaines, George Coe, Michael Dolan, Julianna Margulies, Dick Latessa, Richard Hamilton, Joe Chrest, Barbara Blackburn, Mark Hildreth. Note: Based on the 1991 Tailhook scandal
62	18	"Animal Instinct"	Ed Sherin	Michael S. Chernuchin & Sibyl Gardner	March 17, 1993	68021	12.7
The initial investigation into the death of Faye Walsh a research scientist leads to an animal-rights group until evidence surfaces that her husband's affair with Susan Boyd a coworker may point to a possible motive for the murder. When the husband is acquitted, the investigation turns to the individual who provided evidence of the affair. Guest starring: Frances Fisher, Lawrence Pressman, Charles Brown, Allan Arbus, Peter Maloney, Mary Joy, Martina Deignan
63	19	"Virus (Note: Listed as "Computer Virus" on some home media releases and streaming services.)"	Steven Robman	Michael S. Chernuchin & René Balcer	April 21, 1993	68010	11.9
While investigating several deaths at a diabetes clinic, Briscoe and Logan discover that teenage computer hackers may have tampered with the clinic's medical database. Guest starring: Stephen Elliott, Dana Elcar, Paul Calderón, Stivi Paskoski, Beth Fowler, Harold Perrineau, John Dossett, Jim Fyfe, Lynne Marta, Jim Moody, James A. Baffico
64	20	"Securitate"	James Hayman	Matt Kiene & Joe Reinkemeyer	May 5, 1993	68026	10.8
When a Romanian immigrant kills, his lawyer announces he will plead his client "not guilty due to cultural insanity" claiming the man had been conditioned to violence in his homeland. Guest starring: Morgan Weisser, David Margulies, Richard E. Council, Alan King, Jorja Fox
65	21	"Manhood"	Ed Sherin	S : Walon Green; S/T : Robert Nathan	May 12, 1993	68025	13.7
The statement of a drug dealer who survived a shoot-out that killed a cop leads Logan and Briscoe to suspect that the cop died because he was gay and his fellow officers were reluctant to back him up. Guest starring: Charles Hallahan, Sam Rockwell, Robert Moresco, Dan Grimaldi. Note: This episode was later remade as the Law & Order: UK season 2 episode titled "Samaritan".
66	22	"Benevolence"	Ed Sherin	T : René Balcer; S/T : Douglas Palau	May 19, 1993	68028	15.4
Logan and Briscoe begin their investigation into the death of Kathleen McKenna a hearing-impaired young woman by questioning her two most recent boyfriends. Cast: Last series regular appearances of Dann Florek as Captain Don Cragen, and Richard Brooks as Assistant District Attorney Paul Robinette. Guest starring: Sofia Landon Geier, Peter Kass, Patrick Kerr, Meredith Scott Lynn, Camryn Manheim, Leon Russom
