= Sully Boyar =

American actor (1923–2001)

- Born: Irving Boyar; December 14, 1923; Williamsburg, Brooklyn, U.S.
- Died: March 23, 2001 (aged 77); Queens, New York, U.S.
- Occupation: Actor
- Organization: Actors Studio

Irving "Sully" Boyar (December 14, 1923 – March 23, 2001) was an American character actor of stage, film, and television of Russian-Jewish descent.

== Early life and education ==
Boyar was raised in Williamsburg, Brooklyn, one of seven children, some of whom grew up to become lawyers and businessmen. He worked as a lawyer before turning to acting classes. He had a twin brother named Samuel.

== Career ==
Boyer began his career as a theater actor, with small parts offered by off-Broadway and experimental productions, including those at Judson Poets Theater.

A life member of the Actors Studio, he worked with Al Pacino in Dog Day Afternoon (1975) as the bank manager Mulvaney.

His many other film credits included The Panic in Needle Park (1971), The King of Marvin Gardens (1972), The Gambler (1974), Car Wash (1976), Oliver's Story (1978), Night of the Juggler (1980), The Jazz Singer (1980), Fort Apache, The Bronx (1981), The Entity (1982), Too Scared to Scream (1985), Prizzi's Honor (1985), Best Seller (1987), The Lemon Sisters (1989), Betsy's Wedding (1990), In the Soup (1992), and Just the Ticket (1999).

On television, he appeared as Tom Feeney in the television movie The Deadliest Season (1977). He portrayed Judge Maurice Sanderling in the 1980s CBS series, The Equalizer. He appeared four times in the first four seasons of Law & Order, three of which portraying Judge Harvey Sirkin in a cameo role. He also guest starred on The Sopranos in 2001, playing Dr. Krakower, a psychiatrist consulting with Carmela Soprano.

== Death ==
On March 23, 2001, Boyar died of a heart attack at age 77 while waiting for a bus in Whitestone, Queens.

== Filmography ==
=== Film ===
Sully Boyar film credits
Year	Title	Role	Notes
1965	Man Outside	Policeman	
1969	Me and My Brother		
1971	The Panic in Needle Park	Doctor	
1971	Made for Each Other	Psychiatrist	
1971	The Gang That Couldn't Shoot Straight	Bald Bartender	Uncredited
1972	Last of the Red Hot Lovers	Man #1 Coffee Shop	
1972	The King of Marvin Gardens	Lebowitz	
1972	Up the Sandbox	Fat Man	Uncredited
1974	The Gambler	Uncle Hy	
1975	Dog Day Afternoon	Mulvaney, Bank's manager	
1976	Car Wash	Leon 'Mr. B' Barrow	
1978	Smokey and the Good Time Outlaws		
1978	Oliver's Story	Mr. Gentilano	
1980	Night of the Juggler	Larry the Dog Catcher	
1980	The Kidnapping of the President	FBI Chief	
1980	The Jazz Singer	Eddie Gibbs	
1981	Fort Apache, The Bronx	Dugan	
1982	The Entity	Mr. Reisz	
1983	The American Snitch	Pommeranz	
1985	Too Scared to Scream	Sydney Blume	
1985	Prizzi's Honor	Casco Vascone	
1986	The Manhattan Project	Night Guard	
1987	Best Seller	Monks	
1989	Mortal Sins		
1989	The Lemon Sisters	Baxter O'Neil	
1990	Betsy's Wedding	Morris (Lola's Dad)	
1992	In the Soup	Old Man	
1994	Somebody to Love	Porno Theatre Owner	
1994	Hits!	Mr. Dougherty	
1999	Just the Ticket	Uncle Tony	
2004	Delivery Method		(final film role)

=== Television ===
Sully Boyar television credits
Year	Title	Role	Notes
1977	Kojak	Louie Rindone	2 episodes
1977	The Deadliest Season	Tom Feeney	TV movie
1979	The Rockford Files	Bernard L. Petrankus	1 episode
1980	Charlie's Angels	Stiles	1 episode
1986	The Equalizer	Judge Maurice Sanderling	Episode: "Counterfire"
1989	The Equalizer	Judge Maurice Sanderling	Episode: "Trial by Ordeal"
1990	Law & Order	Swersky	Episode: "Everybody's Favorite Bagman"
1991	Law & Order	Judge Harvey Sirkin	Episode: "Life Choice"
1992	Law & Order	Arraignment Judge Harvey Sirkin	Episode: "The Corporate Veil"
1993	Law & Order	Arraignment Judge Harvey Sirkin	Episode: "Volunteers"
2001	The Sopranos	Dr. Krakower	Episode: "Second Opinion"
