= Manhood (Law & Order) =

21st episode of the third season of Law & Order

- Law & Order episode
- Episode no.: Season 3 Episode 21
- Directed by: Ed Sherin
- Story by: Walon Green; Robert Nathan
- Teleplay by: Robert Nathan
- Original air date: May 12, 1993
- Running time: 47 minutes

Guest appearances
- Charles Hallahan as Capt. Tom O'Hara; Adam Trese as Off. Craig McGraw; Sam Rockwell as Off. Weddeker; Philip Bosco as Gordon Schell

Episode chronology
← Previous "Securitate"	Next → "Benevolence"
- Law & Order (season 3)

"Manhood" is the 21st episode of the third season of the American police procedural television series Law & Order, and the 65th episode overall. The episode's story was written by Walon Green and Robert Nathan, the teleplay was written by Robert Nathan, and was directed by Ed Sherin. The episode originally aired on May 12, 1993, on NBC.

The episode follows the investigation of the death of a police officer killed in the line of duty. When detectives learn that his fellow officers delayed coming to his aid because he was gay, the district attorney's office prosecutes three of them for his death.

== Plot ==
NYPD police officer Rick Newhouse is killed when he is caught alone in a crossfire trying to break up a drug deal. Two units fail to arrive in time to back him up despite his repeated calls. Detectives Lennie Briscoe and Mike Logan quickly arrest a suspect, Lucio Martinez. In his statement, Martinez claims that a police car was parked just around the corner from the scene of the shooting. The detectives discover that Newhouse's service record has gone from spotless to very poor in a matter of months and suspect that he was left to die as payback for failing to overlook corruption in his precinct.

Newhouse's commander, Captain Tom O'Hara, vehemently denies any corruption and tells the detectives and Captain Don Cragen that he personally demanded the suspension of four officers — Rhodes, Harley, Davis and Weddeker — for arriving late to the scene. Briscoe notices a transfer request on O'Hara's desk from Newhouse's partner, Craig McGraw, and finds it strange that he would want to be among strangers immediately after his partner's death. They talk with McGraw but he gives them nothing. They then search Newhouse's apartment and realize that backup was slow to arrive because Newhouse was gay.

Ben Stone and Paul Robinette interview O'Hara and Sergeants Harley and Rhodes, all of whom deny that they knew Newhouse was gay. They interview McGraw, who gives them an anti-gay flier that had circulated at his precinct. After interviewing Officer Weddeker and learning that Harley and Rhodes deliberately delayed their cars' arrivals at the shooting, they indict Rhodes, Harley and Davis for second-degree murder.

At trial, McGraw testifies that the officers in his precinct knew that he and Newhouse were gay, and that they both faced harassment because of it. Defense attorney Gordon Schell changes his strategy, offering psychiatric testimony to support a form of the gay panic defense: The officers, Schell argues, were "upholding the very values of the society that they've sworn to protect". Stone counters that homophobia is no more acceptable than hatred based on race, nationality, religion or politics, and that police officers who allow their own prejudices to interfere with their duties should be held accountable. Nevertheless, the jury acquits the defendants.

== Cast ==
- Jerry Orbach as Detective Lennie Briscoe
- Chris Noth as Detective Mike Logan
- Dann Florek as Captain Donald Cragen
- Michael Moriarty as Executive A.D.A. Ben Stone
- Richard Brooks as A.D.A. Paul Robinette
- Steven Hill as D.A. Adam Schiff
- Charles Hallahan as Captain Tom O'Hara
- Adam Trese as Craig McGraw
- Philip Bosco as Attorney Gordon Schell
- Robert Moresco as Sergeant Henry Rhodes
- Ron Ryan as Sergeant Jack Harley
- Spartan McClure as James Davis
- Sam Rockwell as Officer Weddeker
- Rene Rivera as Lucio Martinez

== Production and reception ==
Co-writer Robert Nathan credits Michael Moriarty with inspiring the strength of his character Ben Stone's closing argument. Moriarty felt that the original summation was weak and suggested that Stone should deliver a variation on Martin Niemöller's famous First they came ... statement, relating the defendants' hatred for gay people to hatred for other groups that might include the jurors. Nathan agreed and rewrote the summation.

Gay media scholar Ron Becker analyzed "Manhood" in terms of how it played to the heterosexual majority. By placing the series' protagonists on the pro-gay side, the episode positions the viewers with Americans who support gay rights. Stone and Adam Schiff's shock at the verdict is meant to inspire similar incredulity in the viewer and a comparison of the police who left the gay officer to die and the jury that acquitted them to the Ku Klux Klan further encourages the viewer to consider him- or herself enlightened on gay issues.

"Manhood" won a 1993 GLAAD Media Award for Outstanding Dramatic Television Episode. Green and Nathan were nominated for an Emmy Award for their script.

In 2009, "Manhood" was remade as the series 2 Law & Order: UK episode "Samaritan".
