= Law & Order season 1 =

Season of American television series

Law & Order
- Season 1
- Season 1 U.S. DVD cover
- Starring: George Dzundza; Chris Noth; Dann Florek; Michael Moriarty; Richard Brooks; Steven Hill
- No. of episodes: 22

Release
- Original network: NBC
- Original release: September 13, 1990 – June 9, 1991

Season chronology
- Next → Season 2

The first season of Law & Order premiered on Canada's CTV on September 11, 1990. In the United States, NBC aired its first episode on September 13, 1990, and concluded on June 9, 1991. The season consists of 22 episodes. It was the only season to feature George Dzundza as Max Greevey. It was the first season to include a longer opening sequence and theme (at 81 seconds). And it was also the first season to include Chris Noth as Junior Detective Mike Logan, Dann Florek as Captain Donald Cragen, Michael Moriarty as Executive Assistant District Attorney Ben Stone, Richard Brooks as Assistant District Attorney Paul Robinette and Steven Hill as District Attorney Adam Schiff.

== Overview ==
Everybody's Favorite Bagman was produced in 1988 for CBS and was intended as the pilot episode of the series. CBS were concerned by the intensity of the episode and series and chose against airing it. Law & Order was picked up by NBC who ordered a full season, with "Prescription for Death" as the premiere episode instead. "Everybody's Favourite Bagman" was the premiere episode in Canada. The series was eventually televised from 1990. It was directed by John Tiffin Patterson and written by Dick Wolf.

== Cast and characters ==
One future core cast member actress made her first appearance in the episode "Mushrooms". S. Epatha Merkerson appeared as Denise Winters, the mother of the victims. She would later appear in season 4 as Lieutenant Anita Van Buren, commander of the 27th Precinct Detective Squad, and play the role for 17 seasons from 1993–2010.

=== Main ===
- George Dzundza as Sergeant Max Greevey
- Chris Noth as Detective Mike Logan
- Dann Florek as Captain Donald Cragen
- Michael Moriarty as Executive Assistant District Attorney Ben Stone
- Richard Brooks as Assistant District Attorney Paul Robinette
- Steven Hill as District Attorney Adam Schiff

=== Recurring ===
- Doris Belack as Trial Judge Margaret Barry
- Tanya Berezin as Trial Judge Rosalyn Lenz
- Philip Bosco as Defense Attorney Gordon Schell
- John Fiore as Detective Tony Profaci
- Sam Gray as Trial Judge Manuel Leon
- Ben Hammer as Trial Judge Herman Mooney
- Mike Hodge as Trial Judge Delano Burns
- Bill Moor as Defense Attorney Bill Patton
- John Newton as Trial Judge Eric Caffey
- Josh Pais as Assistant Medical Examiner Borak
- William Severs as Trial Judge Henry Fillmore
- Brian Smiar as Arraignment Judge Harper
- Barbara Spiegel as Arraignment Judge Harriet Doremus
- Lorraine Toussaint as Public Defender Shambala Green

=== Notable guest stars ===
- Erika Alexander as Doris Carver
- Phillip R. Allen as D.A. Davis
- Bruce Altman as Brad Feldman
- Erick Avari as Dr. Ekballa Raza
- Gerry Bamman as Internal Affairs Lt. Kennedy
- Christine Baranski as Katherine Masucci Beigel
- Philip Bosco as Defense Attorney Gordon Schell
- Sandy Baron as Mike Lucia
- Gil Bellows as Howard Metzler
- Dennis Boutsikaris as Defense Attorney Richard 'Dick' Berkley
- Eugene Byrd as Tonel Otten
- Paul Calderon as Father Roberto Torres
- J. D. Cannon as Chet Burton
- Rocky Carroll as Dr. Davids
- John Capodice as Bernie - Store Owner
- Dominic Chianese as Dan Rubell
- Patricia Clarkson as Laura Winthrop
- Frances Conroy as Elizabeth Hendrick
- Jesse Corti as Angel Suarez
- John Doman as Bailiff
- Stephen Elliott as Judge Neil Markham
- Frankie Faison as Lester Crawford
- John Finn as Freddo Parisi
- Peter Frechette as John 'Jack' Curry
- Al Freeman Jr. as Reverend Thayer
- Megan Gallagher as Monica Devries
- Clark Gregg as Patrick Dunne
- Zach Grenier as Lemish
- David Groh as Dr. Jacob Lowenstein
- Paul Guilfoyle as Anthony Scalisi
- Bob Gunton as Gil Himes
- Ronald Guttman as Carl Reger
- Roxanne Hart as Janet Ralston
- Paul Hecht as Defense Attorney Ballard
- Philip Seymour Hoffman as Steven B. Hanauer
- Samuel L. Jackson as Defense Attorney Louis Taggert
- Caroline Kava as Rose Schwimmer
- Steven Keats as Defense Attorney George Zuckert
- Erik King as Dorian "Silky" Ford
- Marcia Jean Kurtz as Alice Halsey, Carla Lowenstein
- Robert Lansing as COO Peter O'Farrell
- Adam Lefevre as Bartender
- Joe Lisi as Morrel, Mahoney
- William H. Macy as John McCormack
- Wendy Makkena as Officer Nicki Sandoval
- Camryn Manheim as Leila
- Tom Mardirosian as Brian Doxsee
- David Margulies as Simpson
- Stephen McHattie as Joe Pilefsky
- S. Epatha Merkerson as Denise Winters
- Michael P. Moran as Limo Driver
- Haviland Morris as Polly Norris
- Meg Mundy as Helen Ralston
- Cynthia Nixon as Laura Di Biasi
- Alan North as Reilly
- J. A. Preston as Congressman Ronald Eaton
- Victor Raider-Wexler as Harold Morton
- Lee Richardson as Defense Attorney Michael 'Mike' Le Claire
- Ron Rifkin as Phillip Nevins
- Merlin Santana as Ronald Griggs
- Paul Sparer as Dr. Edward Auster
- John Spencer as Howard Morton
- Mike Starr as Truck Driver Tony Halliwell
- Frances Sternhagen as Margaret Langdon
- Roy Thinnes as District Attorney Alfred Wentworth
- Fritz Weaver as Philip Woodleigh
- Jake Weber as Wesley Parker
- Paxton Whitehead as Fenwick
- Trey Wilson as Defense Attorney Eddie Cosmatos

== Episodes ==
No. overall	No. in season	Title	Directed by	Written by	Original release date	Prod. code	U.S. viewers (millions)
1	1	"Prescription for Death"	John P. Whitesell II	S : David Black; S/T : Ed Zuckerman	September 13, 1990	66209	14.0
Teenager Suzanne Morton dies after a visit to a hospital emergency room during a hectic night shift. Her father, a former army medic in Vietnam, accuses the hospital of negligence and demands a police investigation. Logan and Greevey question a doctor who made adjustments to her chart, but are soon led to the respected Dr. Edward Auster, who they feel may have been drunk on duty. The other residents are reluctant to speak for fear their jobs may be in jeopardy, and Stone is faced with the awkward job of prosecuting a revered physician.
2	2	"Subterranean Homeboy Blues"	E. W. Swackhamer	Robert Palm	September 20, 1990	66205	15.5
A white woman, Laura di Biasi, shoots two black men in a crowded subway. The shooting at first appears to be self-defense, but further investigation shows that the motive may be revenge. Logan and Greevey argue about di Biasi's guilt, especially after learning that the dead man has a substantial record, and the living one cannot control himself in court. Laura di Biasi tries to make her case to Robinette, but he distances himself from the issue. Stone has trouble with the case, both in dealing with di Biasi's public defender, Shambala Green, and with the fact that the district attorney's office is divided over the issue.
3	3	"The Reaper's Helper"	Vern Gillum	T : David Black & Robert Stuart Nathan; S/T : Thomas Francis McElroy	October 4, 1990	66215	14.6
Construction worker Bobby Holland is found shot to death in his apartment. Logan and Greevey investigate and soon learn that Holland was gay. After reading a magazine article, Greevey connects the death to others in Los Angeles and San Francisco. The detectives arrest Jack Curry, who is connected to all three cases. Curry admits his involvement and claims that each man asked him to help them commit suicide because they had AIDS. Stone is troubled about prosecuting the case because of his doubts that Curry did anything wrong.
4	4	"Kiss the Girls and Make Them Die"	Charles Correll	S : Dick Wolf; T : Robert Stuart Nathan	October 11, 1990	66210	16.8
Paige Bartlett is found beaten severely in her Upper East Side apartment. She dies in the hospital. Greevey and Logan investigate her boyfriend Steven Feinstein, but find that they broke up the evening before she was killed. The detectives locate another boyfriend, Ned Loomis, and learn that he has a history of violence after another former victim comes forward. Stone is frustrated when he is not able to use Loomis' former crimes against him in court.
5	5	"Happily Ever After"	Vern Gillum	S : Dick Wolf; T : Robert Stuart Nathan; S/T : David Black	October 23, 1990	66216	19.4
Alan Ralston is shot to death and his wife Janet wounded inside their building parking garage. In hospital, Janet identifies the alleged attacker from a police photo. One witness questioned early in the investigation is Gil Himes, a business associate of Alan. Police eventually piece together that the crime was not a random act of violence by the identified attacker. Rather it was the intentional murder of Alan and equally intentional wounding of Janet. Stone tries to get one of the suspects to testify against the other.
6	6	"Everybody's Favorite Bagman"	John Patterson	Dick Wolf	October 30, 1990	83543	18.2
After local councilman and former bagman Charles Halsey is mugged and his throat slashed, Logan and Greevey investigate the case and the two young black male suspects initially caught. Their suspicion turns to organized crime when they link the victim to Masucci soldier Tony Scalisi. As Stone and Robinette continue their investigation, they uncover a corruption scandal involving Councilman Halsey; the collection of parking meter violation fines has been awarded to a firm connected to organized crime. To avoid the appearance of impropriety, District Attorney Wentworth won't allow Stone to offer Scalisi immunity. However, in order to win their case, their only option might be to make a deal with the mobster. Stone discovers that the case involves not only organized crime, but also elected city officials and a deputy police commissioner whom he accuses of changing his testimony and doctoring evidence in a past case. Stone is unable to use the police because of suspected corruption within the department, so he consults Assistant U.S. Attorney John McCormack.
7	7	"By Hooker, By Crook"	Martin Davidson	David Black	November 13, 1990	66203	17.7
The discovery of an unconscious man named Diamond in Central Park leads Greevey and Logan to Diamond's previous activity and locale—with an escort named Jolene in a hotel room. Greevey poses as a "john" looking for Jolene. When she stipulates her fees and services, Greevey arrests her for solicitation. When Diamond dies, the investigation leads to Jolene's superior, Jasmine; then, it leads to Jasmine's superior, Laura Winthrop. Winthrop claims that she runs a catering service, but when Jolene's blood tests HIV-positive, the case takes a sharp tack questioning the safety of the escort service industry.
8	8	"Poison Ivy"	E. W. Swackhamer	S : Jack Richardson; S/T : Jacob Brackman	November 20, 1990	66211	15.0
During a routine drug arrest, Freddo Parisi a veteran police officer, kills Tommy Richardson a young African-American man, who may have been unarmed. Parisi is accused of planting a gun on the victim to justify the shooting. Moreover, Parisi has a similar incident already on his record. Richardson was a student at Princeton University who was well respected for his contributions to his community in terms of time, energy, and money. But the investigation reveals that he sold drugs to get the money.
9	9	"Indifference"	James Quinn	Robert Palm	November 27, 1990	66207	17.6
Greevey and Logan discover that an abused child Didi Lowenstein has a cocaine-addicted mother Carla, who is also being abused by Jacob her drug-addicted psychotherapist husband. The detectives investigate the doctor's checkered past, while prosecutors take a new tactic after the child dies.
10	10	"Prisoner of Love"	Michael Fresco	S : David Black; S/T : Robert Stuart Nathan	December 4, 1990	66208	16.8
The apparent suicide of Victor More a controversial bisexual artist, who died while engaging in an apparent act of auto-erotic strangulation, leads Detectives Greevey and Logan into the city's bondage/S&M subculture. The initial explanation for the artist/victim's position is that he was involved in a "performance art work." Further investigation reveals that, in fact, he was one of a sadomasochistic trio that included the head of the New York City Department of Cultural Affairs and his "mistress," a wealthy socialite dominatrix who instigated and monitored the S&M scene that led to the artist's death.
11	11	"Out of the Half-Light"	E. W. Swackhamer	Michael Duggan	December 11, 1990	66202	19.8
A teenaged African-American girl Astrea Crawford claims to have been raped by white police officers. Police and prosecutors struggle to get the truth when an ambitious African-American congressman claims the investigation is a racially motivated cover-up. However, when the rape kit tests negative, the prosecution suspects the case may be a hoax. The conflict heats until Robinette learns from the girl's parents that she and her boyfriend had sexual relations. The family fears an unwanted pregnancy, so, with the urging of the congressman, they claim the girl was raped by police officers. Having admitted the hoax, the family avoids the congressman whose campaign has been destroyed. Prosecutors devise a solution involving all-round gag orders. They concede that reputations were seriously damaged, but they reason that, with its impetus deflated, the case will fade quickly from people's memories.
12	12	"Life Choice"	Aaron Lipstadt	S : Dick Wolf; T : David Black & Robert Stuart Nathan	January 8, 1991	66213	19.2
After Mary Donovan, an anti-abortion protester, is killed in an abortion center bombing, detectives search for all of her potential co-conspirators. The victim's parents and brother prove to be as committed to the anti-abortion movement as the victim. The first defendant arrested is Celeste McClure, who purchased the fertilizer to be mixed with the diesel fuel to create the bomb. Police determine that the central figure in the plot is Rose Schwimmer who is arrested. Detectives discover that the victim was pregnant and was secretly seeking an abortion. At trial, Schwimmer attempts to use her witness testimony to preach against abortion. Stone stops the attempt by asking Schwimmer that, if abortion is murder, is Schwimmer not guilty of murdering Mary Donovan's unborn baby. Schwimmer is visibly defeated by the question and remains silent for the remainder of the trial, including her conviction.
13	13	"A Death in the Family"	Gwen Arner	T : David Black; S/T : Joe Viola	January 15, 1991	66204	17.8
NYPD officer Pete Rennick is shot to death on a rooftop in the dark; Logan and Greevey believe that a crook known as Brutus Walker is responsible for it, and the NYPD initiates a citywide manhunt for him. However, it later turns out that Walker was not the one who shot Rennick; it was his partner, Nicki Sandoval. Investigation reveals that, after displaying many blatant examples of his corruption to his partner, he was afraid that she would report him. So he lured her to the rooftop and tried to kill her, but she killed him first in self-defense. She is cleared of the shooting, but since policy dictates that she should have reported him, she may lose her job or face other disciplinary actions.
14	14	"The Violence of Summer"	Don Scardino	Michael Duggan	February 5, 1991	66219	16.2
Stone temporarily dismisses rape charges against three defendants because the victim is a journalist of questionable character whose testimony has too many flaws. Greevey and Logan's subsequent reinvestigation uncovers a possible fourth assailant.
15	15	"The Torrents of Greed"	E. W. Swackhamer	S : Michael Duggan; S/T : Michael S. Chernuchin	February 12, 1991	66222	16.6
16	16	"The Torrents of Greed"	E. W. Swackhamer	S : Michael Duggan; S/T : Michael S. Chernuchin	February 19, 1991	66225	13.6
Part I: Detectives arrest three members of the Masucci crime family involved in a fatal assault, which leads to Stone attempting to use the arrest as a means to take down the entire Masucci crime syndicate via charging Mafia chieftain Frank Masucci. However, the plan backfires when Stone discovers that his chief witness (one of the three charged in the fatal assault) perjures himself on the stand, leading to Masucci's acquittal. Part II: In the wake of Masucci's acquittal, ADAs Stone and Robinette intensify their investigation with the mob boss. Their investigation leads them to bust Masucci's brother-in-law, who the mob boss promptly has murdered. The murder leads to the discovery of the dumping ground for victims of Masucci's crime syndicate. As they re-arrest the mob boss, his grieving sister supports her brother in court by putting up the money for his bail. However, within hours of leaving the courtroom, Frank Masucci is killed by an unknown hitman. Robinette and Stone speculate that Masucci's sister is the one who ordered the hit, but are unable to prove it. The two men, along with Adam Schiff, take comfort in the fact that in spite of their failure to bring Masucci to justice through the legal system, his death will severely cripple the crime family.
17	17	"Mushrooms"	Daniel Sackheim	Robert Palm	February 26, 1991	66218	15.6
A 12-year-old boy, Gregory Winters, is injured and his infant brother, Andrew, is killed by gunshots. The investigation reveals the children were the accidental victims of a hit ordered by Michael Ingrams, a drug dealer, against a real estate broker. Tragically, the shootings prove to be the result of an adolescent gunman targeting the wrong address because he knows more about operating automatic weapons than about basic reading.
18	18	"The Secret Sharers"	E. W. Swackhamer	Robert Stuart Nathan	March 12, 1991	66221	13.2
Stone faces Chet Burton, a Texas cowboy lawyer, and a hostile community as he tries to prosecute Nicky Guzman, a young man accused of murdering Jose Urbano, a drug dealer. He discovers two truths...that the drug dealer raped the defendant's sister, and that the community views the murder as retribution.
19	19	"The Serpent's Tooth"	Don Scardino	S : I.C. Rapoport & Joshua Stern; T : René Balcer & Robert Stuart Nathan	March 19, 1991	66224	19.3
A businessman and his wife, Carl and Everlyn Jarmon, are murdered; initially, the couple's two sons, Nick and Greg, are treated as suspects. As the investigation develops, detectives discover that in order to obtain financing for his business, the man took on a partner who was connected to Russian organized crime.
20	20	"The Troubles"	John P. Whitesell II	S : Dick Wolf; S/T : Robert Palm	March 26, 1991	66214	17.4
A truck with three handcuffed federal prisoners arrives at the 27th precinct. FBI and NYPD officials discover that one of the prisoners has mysteriously been murdered. The FBI officials assert jurisdiction and transport the other two to a federal prison. One of the two is a suspected IRA member who has been detained in the U.S. for five years without charge, bail or trial. Shortly afterwards, the remaining prisoner is discovered hanging in his federal prison cell. A prison guard is discovered to be an IRA member; he confesses to the prisoner's murder. Detectives and prosecutors face resistance from federal authorities as they pursue murder charges against a suspected IRA member serving time in federal prison, after he is suspected of killing another federal prisoner.
21	21	"Sonata for Solo Organ"	Fred Gerber	S : Michael Duggan; T : Michael S. Chernuchin; S/T : Joe Morgenstern	April 2, 1991	66226	18.0
Greevey and Logan discover that Drew McDaniel, an apparent mugging victim found unconscious on a park bench, has had his kidney removed. The case leads to Philip Woodleigh, a powerful man whose daughter desperately needed a transplant, and the doctor who may have helped him.
22	22	"The Blue Wall"	Vern Gillum	S : Dick Wolf; S/T : Robert Stuart Nathan	June 9, 1991	66220	12.2
Captain Cragen ends up in the cross-hairs of an internal investigation into evidence tampering, and the DA's office is forced to put him in a precarious situation to implicate the conspirators. Cast: Final appearance of George Dzundza as Max Greevey.
