= Life Choice =

twelfth episode of the first season of Law & Order

- Law & Order episode
- Episode no.: Season 1 Episode 12
- Directed by: Aaron Lipstadt
- Written by: David Black; Robert Stuart Nathan
- Production code: 66213
- Original air date: January 8, 1991
- Running time: 48 minutes

Episode chronology
← Previous "Out of the Half-Light"	Next → "A Death in the Family"
- Law & Order season 1

"Life Choice" is the twelfth episode of the first season of Law and Order. It was directed by Aaron Lipstadt, from a story by Dick Wolf and a teleplay by David Black and Robert Stuart Nathan. It originally aired on NBC on January 8, 1991.

The episode follows the investigation of a bombing at an abortion clinic that kills a young woman, leading detectives to investigate members of an anti-abortion organization. The case places Detectives Max Greevey and Mike Logan on opposing sides of the abortion debate.

== Plot ==
A bomb explodes at an abortion clinic, killing 22-year-old Mary Donovan. Sergeant Max Greevey and Detective Mike Logan investigate and discover that Donovan was carrying false identification and initially conclude that she brought the bomb into the clinic. They learn that Donovan was involved with Women for Life, an anti-abortion organization, and begin investigating others connected to the group.

The detectives trace materials used in the bomb to Celeste McClure, who purchased fertilizer used to make the explosive. Their investigation increasingly focuses on Rose Schwimmer, the leader of Women for Life, whom they suspect of directing the bombing. Celeste is arrested as the investigation continues.

After Celeste’s arrest, the detectives discover that Mary was pregnant and had secretly intended to have an abortion. This changes the direction of the investigation and strengthens their suspicions that Rose Schwimmer was responsible for Mary’s death. Schwimmer is arrested and charged with murder.

At trial, Schwimmer takes the stand and attempts to justify her actions through her opposition to abortion. Stone challenges her by asking whether, according to her own belief that abortion is murder, the bombing also made her responsible for the death of Donovan’s unborn child. Schwimmer is left unable to respond and is ultimately convicted.

== Cast ==
=== Main ===
- George Dzundza as Sergeant Max Greevey
- Chris Noth as Detective Mike Logan
- Dann Florek as Captain Donald “Don” Cragen
- Michael Moriarty as Executive ADA Ben Stone
- Richard Brooks as A.D.A. Paul Robinette
- Steven Hill as D.A. Adam Schiff

=== Recurring ===
- Sully Boyar as Arraignment Judge Harvey Sirkin

=== Guest stars ===
- Caroline Kava as Rose Schwimmer
- Paul Hecht as Defense Attorney Ballard
- Pat McNamara as Defense Attorney Molloy
- Clark Gregg as Patrick Dunne
- Jaime Tirelli as CSU Technician Rivera
- Bridgit Ryan as Celeste McClure
- Paul Butler as Judge Tyler B. Ashford
- Kevin Cooney as Geoffrey Donovan
- Laurie Kennedy as Barbara Donovan
- Kevin O'Rourke as Kevin Donovan
- Johann Carlo as Colman
- Jonathan Hogan as Corcoran
- LaTanya Richardson as Lorraine
- Jim Fyfe as Cleary
- Julie Halston as Jane
- Isa Thomas as Gwen Matson
- Rafael Ferrer as Clerk
- Steve Itkin as O'Hare
- Howard Spiegel as Bernstein
- Timothy Britten Parker as Cioran
- Larry Attile as Foreman
- Richard M. Davidson as Court Clerk
- Camryn Manheim as Leila
- Lynn Anderson as Woman #1
- Jane Sanders as Woman #2
- Lennie Loftin as Fogarty
- Frank Anderson as Man #1

== Production ==
“Life Choice” was directed by Aaron Lipstadt from a story by series creator Dick Wolfe and a teleplay by David Black and Robert Stuart Nathan. Robert Palm and Daniel Sackheim served as producers,

The episode generated controversy because of its abortion storyline. Dick Wolf later recalled that approximately $900,000 in advertising was withdrawn in response to the episode,while NBC executive Brandon Tartikoff continued to support its broadcast.

== Reception and legacy ==
In 2009, TV Guide ranked “Life Choice” 68th on its list of the 100 greatest television episodes of all time. The magazine described it as series creator Dick Wolf’s favorite episode and noted the controversy surrounding its abortion-clinic bombing storyline.

In a retrospective ranking of the first season of Law & Order, The Postrider ranked “Life Choice” as the season’s best episode.
