= Stephen Pearlman =

American stage, television and film actor (1935–1998)

- Pearlman as he appears in Die Hard with a Vengeance
- Born: February 26, 1935; Brooklyn, New York, U.S
- Died: September 30, 1998 (aged 63); Manhattan, New York, U.S
- Education: Dartmouth College
- Occupation: Actor
- Years active: 1954–1998
- Notable work: Die Hard with a Vengeance, Pi, The First Wives Club
- Spouse: Stefanie Solow Glennon (m. 19?? – 1998; his death)

Stephen Pearlman (February 26, 1935 – September 30, 1998) was an American theatre, film and television actor, known for starring in the films Die Hard with a Vengeance and Pi. He also played Zampano in the Broadway musical La Strada.

== Biography ==
Pearlman was born in Brooklyn but raised in Jersey City, New Jersey. After graduating from Dartmouth College in 1954, Pearlman immediately become a theatre actor making his New York stage play debut in The Threepenny Opera in 1959. He has also acted in La Strada in 1969, in which he played one of the leading roles. He also appeared in many film and television roles such as Die Hard with a Vengeance, Seinfeld, Pi and Law and Order.

== Death ==
Pearlman died on September 30, 1998, in his Manhattan apartment. The reported cause of death was cancer.

== Filmography ==
Year	Title	Role	Notes
1962	Don't Call Me Charlie!	MP	TV series Episode: "A Friend in Need"
1973	The Iceman Cometh	Chuck Morelo	
1973	Serpico	Desk Sergeant	Uncredited
1977	Audrey Rose	Russ Rothman	
1977	Rollercoaster	Lyons	
1978	American Hot Wax	Peter Overmyer	
1980	Xanadu	Foreman	
1990	Green Card	Mr. Adler	
1990	Law & Order	Rosen	TV series Episode: "Everybody's Favorite Bagman"
1991	Saying Kaddish	Jack	
1991	Age Isn't Everything	Unknown	
1992	Law & Order	Leonard Willis	TV series Episode: "Intolerance"
1992	Claude	Mr. Gold	
1992	My New Gun	Al Schlyen	
1993	The Cemetery Club	Rabbi	
1994	Seinfeld	Mr. Goldstein	TV series Episode: "The Raincoats"
1994	Quiz Show	Judge Schweitzer	
1995	Die Hard with a Vengeance	Dr. Fred Schiller	
1995	Animal Room	Principal Jones	
1996	The First Wives Club	Mr. Christian	
1997	Private Parts	Couple Looking for Apartment	
1997	Commandments	Rabbi	
1998	Law & Order	Dr. Leon Mayer	TV series Episode: "Expert'"
1998	Pi	Rabbi Cohen	
1998	The Horse Whisperer	David Gottschalk	
2000	Fear of Fiction	Mr. Basketball Head	(final film role); Released posthumously
