= The Violence of Summer =

The Violence of Summer may refer to:

- Violence of Summer (Love's Taking Over), Duran Duran single
- The Violence of Summer (Law & Order), television episode
