= Firepower (1979 film) =

1979 British film by Michael Winner

- Original theatrical poster
- Directed by: Michael Winner
- Written by: Gerald Wilson
- Based on: story by Bill Kerby; Michael Winner
- Produced by: Michael Winner
- Starring: Sophia Loren; James Coburn; O. J. Simpson; Eli Wallach; Victor Mature; Jake LaMotta
- Cinematography: Robert Paynter
- Edited by: Michael Winner
- Music by: Gato Barbieri
- Production companies: ITC Entertainment; Michael Winner Productions
- Distributed by: Associated Film Distribution
- Release date: 13 April 1979
- Running time: 104 minutes
- Countries: United Kingdom; United States
- Language: English
- Budget: $8 million
- Box office: $1.2 million (US rentals)

Firepower (aka Fire Power) is a 1979 British-American action-thriller film directed by Michael Winner and starring Sophia Loren, James Coburn, O. J. Simpson and Eli Wallach. It was the final film in the career of actor Victor Mature. The film was poorly reviewed by critics who objected to its convoluted plot, though the lead performances and filming locations were generally praised.

== Plot ==
In New York City, Adele Tasca is present when her husband is murdered by a letter bomb. She suspects the reclusive billionaire Karl Stegner, his former employer, of committing the assassination. She learns that her husband, who worked as a chemist, discovered that his employer had made a contaminated drug that resulted in patients contracting cancer. The US government would like to be able to find and bring charges against this mysterious Stegner, who hides his face from the world and his income from the tax department.

FBI agent Frank Hull is assigned to the case but does not know how to find Stegner. He decides to use a former secret agent, Sal Hyman, to help him. The latter hires Jerry Fannon, a former mafia hitman, for a million dollars, and sends him to Antigua. Sal thinks Jerry is the only man likely to infiltrate the network that protects Stegner.

His right-hand man, Catlett is killed by Leo Gelhorn on the island, but with the help of the beautiful Adele, who wants revenge, Jerry succeeds in tracking down Stegner, before realizing that he actually captured Stegner's double, who was the victim of an attack by Stegner's men. Jerry returns to the island where Stegner is hiding. The mysterious Dr. Felix is really Stegner.

After disposing of the vehicles and the helicopter of Dr. Felix, Jerry enters the house with a bulldozer. He takes Felix prisoner and leaves with him and Adele, pursued by Stegner's bodyguards. As they prepare to leave the island by seaplane, Adele turns a gun on Jerry. Felix takes his weapon, but when he fires at Jerry, Adele turns away. Jerry finally takes off with Dr. Felix to be brought to justice.

A little later, Adele is introduced to Harold Everett, another billionaire who she sets her eyes on, as her next conquest.

== Cast ==
- Sophia Loren as Adele Tasca
- James Coburn as Jerry Fanon/Eddie
- O. J. Simpson as Catlett
- Eli Wallach as Sal Hyman
- Anthony Franciosa as Dr. Charles Felix
- George Grizzard as Leo Gelhorn
- Vincent Gardenia as Frank Hull
- Victor Mature as Harold Everett
- Jake LaMotta as Nickel Sam
- Hank Garrett as Oscar Bailey
- George Touliatos as Karl Stegner
- Conrad Roberts as Lestor Wallace
- Billy Barty as Dominic Carbone
- Vincent Beck as Trilling
- Dominic Chianese as Orlov
- Andrew Duncan as Del Cooper
- Paul D'Amato as Tagua

== Production ==
Firepower started as a Dirty Harry film written by Bill Kerby. It was considerably rewritten. In 1977, O. J. Simpson mentioned one of his upcoming projects was Fire Power for producer Carlo Ponti with Terence Hill.

Sophia Loren was cast at a reported fee of $1 million.

According to director Michael Winner, producer Lew Grade had fully expected Charles Bronson to co-star with Loren. With much of the pre-production crew already on location in the Caribbean (Saint Lucia), Grade wanted to shut down the production when Bronson pulled out. Realizing how much money he had already sunk into a film that had not properly secured its star actors, Grade saved face by moving ahead and using James Coburn as a replacement for Bronson.

Coburn said "I did it for the money, the locations (the Caribbean islands) and to work with Sophia Loren. The director was Michael Winner. He’s probably one of the weirdest guys I’ve ever met. Yet, I thought he was a good guy when I first met him. But when he got on the set, he was almost like a total dictator. I found it hard to work for that way. The most fun I had was when I got to drive a bulldozer through a house in the islands (laughs).” It was one of Coburn's last leading roles.

Winner says the millionaire character was based on Howard Hughes and Robert Vesco.

Firepower was filmed in Curaçao, Saint Lucia, Antigua, Brooklyn, New Jersey, New York, Miami, Florida, and Key Largo, Florida. Bridgeport, Connecticut.

Victor Mature makes a cameo at the request of director Michael Winner, who wanted someone instantly recognisable for the role of one of the richest people in the world. "I worked for eight hours on one scene," he laughed. (Note: Winner recalled Mature "let his hair go grey when he did 'Firepower' with Sophia Loren. He dyed it dark but it came out green. Sophia was orange so he said that the end of the film was the green man meets the orange woman.")

Winner says he "resented" having O. J. Simpson imposed on him but "now I am happy he was given to me because what he lacks in experience he makes up with in charisma." Simpson said "there were times on this movie, I didn't feel comfortable. I needed a little more attention from the director to establish my character."

== Reception ==
Firepower was an early release from AFD, a new distribution company set up by Lew Grade in association with EMI to distribute their films in the US.

=== Critical ===
Janet Maslin of The New York Times wrote: "Mr. Winner directs movies the way others toss salads, which means that “Firepower” is best appreciated at a kind of mental half‐mast. A lot happens. None of it makes sense". She further added: "Some of the performances Mr. Winner gets from his supporting players are rip‐roaringly awful, as is Gato Barbieri's loud and schlocky score. However, there's a nice chemistry in the teaming of Miss Loren, Mr. Coburn and Mr. Simpson, each of whom has an unusually physical presence on the screen."

Author John Howard Reid concurred that the plot was too convoluted, stating that the film has "enough plot twists and action sequences for a dozen movies". He approved of the performances, but expressed disappointment that Victor Mature barely had any screen time and was not central to the plot and that Coburn's double role wasn't used to better effect.

The review in Variety noted: "If the story becomes too tough or tiresome to follow, or the action grows tepid and repetitive, there’s always the beautiful scenery of the glamorous Caribbean locales."
