= Suspect (1987 film) =

1987 film by Peter Yates

- Theatrical release poster
- Directed by: Peter Yates
- Written by: Eric Roth
- Produced by: Daniel A. Sherkow
- Starring: Cher; Dennis Quaid; Liam Neeson; John Mahoney; Joe Mantegna
- Cinematography: Billy Williams
- Edited by: Ray Lovejoy
- Music by: Michael Kamen
- Production company: ML Delphi Premier Productions
- Distributed by: Tri-Star Pictures
- Release date: October 23, 1987
- Running time: 121 minutes
- Country: United States
- Language: English
- Budget: $14.5 million
- Box office: $18.7 million

Suspect is a 1987 American legal thriller film directed by Peter Yates and starring Cher, Dennis Quaid and Liam Neeson. Other notable cast members include John Mahoney, Joe Mantegna, Fred Melamed and Philip Bosco.

In the film, a female law clerk investigates an old case and questions the trial judge. Shortly afterward, the judge kills himself and the clerk is murdered. A deaf-mute Vietnam veteran is charged with the murder, but a public defender and a political lobbyist suspect that he has not killed anyone.

== Plot ==
Elizabeth Quinn, a law clerk, stumbles onto something while working on the transcripts of a 17-year old case. She approaches the trial judge, who gives her a cassette tape before taking his own life. Quinn is found murdered shortly thereafter.

A homeless man is accused of the murder after being caught with the clerk's wallet and a large knife. To face trial, the homeless man is assigned a public defender, Kathleen Riley.

Political lobbyist Eddie Sanger wants to get out of jury duty but impresses Riley with his extreme attention to detail. Riley does not believe the homeless man, a violent left-handed deaf-mute Vietnam veteran, was the murderer and reluctantly teams up with Sanger to find the real murderer. Judge Matthew Helms wants a speedy trial for personal reasons and denies Riley's request for more time to investigate the death of a potential witness.

Riley discovers the cassette tape in the law clerk's car and listens to the confession recorded by the judge who committed suicide. Armed with the tape, Riley reveals in court that Helms was the prosecutor "fixing" the case discovered by the law clerk. Riley further reveals that Helms was the real murderer. Riley and Sanger, who became romantically involved during the trial, celebrate in her office.

== Cast ==
- Cher as Kathleen Riley
- Dennis Quaid as Eddie Sanger
- Liam Neeson as Carl Wayne Anderson
- John Mahoney as Judge Matthew Bishop Helms
- Joe Mantegna as Charlie Stella
- Philip Bosco as Paul Gray
- E. Katherine Kerr as Grace Comisky
- Fred Melamed as Morty Rosenthal
- Bernie McInerney as Walter
- Bill Cobbs as Judge Franklin
- Richard Gant as Everett Bennett
- Paul D'Amato as Michael John Guthridge
- Thomas Barbour as Justice Lowell
- Katie O'Hare as Elizabeth Quinn
- Jim Walton as Helms' Court Marshal
- Michael Beach as Parking Lot Attendant
- Ralph Cosham as Judge Assel Stewart
- Djanet Sears as Message Clerk

== Reception ==
The film's climactic scene (in which the actual murderer is revealed) was panned by Roger Ebert, whose review noted that it is "as if an Agatha Christie novel evaluated six suspects in a British country house, and then in the last chapter we discover the killer was a guy from next door."

In the Los Angeles Times, film critic Sheila Benson wrote:

As it speeds toward its finale, there are plot holes the size of Manhattan potholes, although it is refreshing to have so menacing a thriller with such a relatively low level of violence. And there isn't a car chase from start to finish--amazing restraint from the director of Bullitt, and a positive point of pride these days. This is one to enjoy, but not to question too closely.

On review aggregator website Rotten Tomatoes, the film holds an approval rating of 68%, based on 19 reviews, and an average rating of 6.5/10. On Metacritic — which assigns a weighted mean score — the film has a score of 53 out of 100 based on 13 critics, indicating "mixed or average reviews". Audiences polled by CinemaScore gave the film an average grade of "B+" on an A+ to F scale.

== See also ==
- List of films featuring the deaf and hard of hearing
