= Prescription for Death =

1990 episode of Law & Order

- Law & Order episode
- Episode no.: Season 1 Episode 1
- Directed by: John P. Whitesell II
- Story by: David Black; Ed Zuckerman
- Teleplay by: Ed Zuckerman
- Editing by: Drake Silliman
- Original air date: September 13, 1990

Guest appearances
- Paul Sparer as Dr. Edward Auster; John Spencer as Howard Morton; Rocky Carroll as Dr. Davids; Ron Rifkin as Phillip Nevins; Erick Avari as Dr. Ekballa Raza; Erika Jayne as Suzanne Morton Uncredited

Episode chronology
← Previous —	Next → "Subterranean Homeboy Blues"

"Prescription for Death" is the series premiere of the American crime drama television series Law & Order. The episode's teleplay was written by Ed Zuckerman, the story was written by David Black and Ed Zuckerman, and was directed by John P. Whitesell II. The episode originally aired on NBC in the United States on September 13, 1990, and although it was the first episode of the series to air, it is not the pilot. The pilot episode, "Everybody's Favorite Bagman", which was filmed two years prior to the rest of the first season, aired as the sixth episode. "Prescription for Death" is based upon the death of Libby Zion.

== Plot ==
Teenager Suzanne Morton dies after a visit to a hospital emergency room during a hectic night shift. Her father (John Spencer), a former medic in Vietnam, accuses the hospital of negligence and demands a police investigation. Logan and Greevey question a doctor who made adjustments to her chart, but are soon led to the respected Dr. Edward Auster, whom they feel might have been drunk on duty. The other residents are reluctant to speak for fear of putting their jobs in jeopardy, and Stone is faced with the awkward job of prosecuting a revered physician.
