= Assignment Manhunt =

American TV dramatic anthology series (1951–1952)

Assignment Manhunt is an American television dramatic anthology series that was broadcast on NBC from July 14, 1951, to September 1, 1951, and from July 5, 1952, to August 23, 1952, serving as the summer replacement for Your Hit Parade.

== Overview ==
Episodes of Assignment Manhunt were adapted from stories of adventure and suspense that had been used in books, films, or magazines. Actors who appeared on the program included Roger De Koven, Paul Langton, Rod Steiger, Gerald S. O'Loughlin, Lonny Chapman, Peggy McCay, Jeff Morrow, Martin Brooks, and Amzie Strickland.

== Episodes ==
Partial List of Episodes of Assignment Manhunt
| Date | Episode |
|---|---|
| July 28, 1951 | "The Pipes Are Calling" |
| August 4, 1951 | "Sentence of Death" |
| August 11, 1951 | "The Trap" |
| August 18, 1951 | "Confidential Agent" |
| August 25, 1951 | "Delayed Verdict" |
| September 1, 1951 | "The Good Prospect" |
| July 5, 1952 | "Overdue Account" |

== Production ==
Julian Claman was the producer. Directors included Daniel Petrie, Bill Hobin, and Peter Kass. Sponsored by Lucky Strike cigarettes, the program was broadcast on Saturdays from 10:30 to 11 p.m. Eastern Time. It originated from WNBT. Kinescope recordings of Assignment Manhunt were among films of 15 programs provided by TV networks for viewing by American military forces overseas in 1951. After review by an armed forces committee, films selected were to be shown at military bases, mainly those in the Korean area.

== Critical response ==
In a column in The Cincinnati Enquirer, John Caldwell wrote that Assignment Manhunt "is certainly a welcome relief from all the private eyes doing business at other stands this summer". Caldwell compared the program to Dragnet in its use of facts as it recounted pursuit of lawbreakers and in the way it showed policemen "as earnest men doing their job without fanfare". He wrote that although Assignment Manhunt had not reached Dragnet's level of excellence, its stories and production values exceeded those of other crime programs on television.
