= The Lesser Evil (1998 film) =

- VHS cover
- Directed by: David Mackay
- Written by: Jeremy Levine; Stephan Schultze
- Produced by: Daniel Helberg; David Mackay
- Starring: Colm Feore; Tony Goldwyn; Arliss Howard; David Paymer
- Cinematography: Stephan Schultze
- Edited by: Bret Marnell
- Music by: Don Davis
- Distributed by: MGM Home Entertainment
- Release date: September 13, 1998 (United Kingdom)
- Running time: 96 minutes
- Country: United States
- Language: English

The Lesser Evil is a 1998 American psychological thriller film produced and directed by David Mackay, written by Jeremy Levine and Stephan Schultze, and starring Colm Feore, Tony Goldwyn, Arliss Howard, and David Paymer. A nonlinear narrative film, it follows four men allegedly hiding the crime they committed after twenty years.

== Plot ==
In the 1970s, Derek Eastman, Frank O'Brian, Ivan Williams, and George are a friendly quadruple adolescent group, who had allegedly committed a murder: one of them inside the car was disposed in the lake near the cliff and the other died in the forest. Twenty two years later, they became employees hiding the truth in the log cabin. The flashback connects between the past and present day. When they betray each other, they confirm that the gun was used by Derek, whom Ivan killed. After the funeral, the rest of the men move on.

== Cast ==
- Colm Feore as Derek Eastman, a lumberyard businessman
  - Jonathan Scarfe as Young Derek
- Tony Goldwyn as Frank O'Brian, a police officer
  - Steven Petrarca as Young Frank
- Arliss Howard as Ivan Williams, a Catholic priest
  - Marc Worden as Young Ivan
- David Paymer as George, a lawyer
  - Adam Scott as Young George
- Jack Kehler as Hardaway, a detective
- Mason Adams as Derek's father

== Production ==
The story of the film is set in Missouri. The film was shot in Winston-Salem, North Carolina.

== Reception ==
The film has a 60% approval rating on the review aggregator Rotten Tomatoes based on 5 reviews, with an average score of 7.07/10. Variety gave a positive review, calling the film "a crafty and well-crafted drama", and Film Threat praised it as "an exceptionally well told tale".
