= The Violence of Summer (Law & Order) =

14th episode of the first season of Law & Order

- Law & Order episode
- Episode no.: Season 1 Episode 14
- Directed by: Don Scardino
- Written by: Michael Duggan
- Original air date: February 5, 1991
- Running time: 48 minutes

Guest appearances
- Megan Gallagher as Monica Devries; Samuel L. Jackson as Defense Attorney Louis Taggert; Randy Danson as Diane Manso; Sandy Baron as Mike Lucia; Al Shannon as Tim Pruiting; Gil Bellows as Howard Metzler; Philip Seymour Hoffman as Steven Hanauer; Kenny Johnston as Ryan Cutrona; David Green as Dr. Kornfeld; Robert Heller as Silva; Marie Barrientos as Mimi Vitella; Jean Taylor as Mrs. Hollis

Episode chronology
← Previous "A Death in the Family"	Next → "The Torrents of Greed"

The Violence of Summer is the fourteenth episode of the first season of the American police procedural television series Law and Order. It was directed by Don Scardino and written by Michael Duggan. It originally aired on NBC on February 5, 1991. The episode concerns the investigation and prosecution of the sexual assault of a television news reporter, complicated by difficulties with the victim’s recollection of the attack and conflicting accounts from the suspects.

The episode features guest appearances by Samuel L. Jackson, Megan Gallagher, Gil Bellows, and Philip Seymour Hoffman.

== Plot ==
Television reporter Monica Devries is sexually assaulted by a group of men. Three suspects are arrested, but prosecutors Ben Stone and Paul Robinette encounter problems with the case when the physical evidence does not match the defendants and Devries is unable to clearly remember the attack. Stone temporarily dismisses the charges and asks Sergeant Max Greevey and Detective Mike Logan to reinvestigate the case and find additional evidence.

Greevey and Logan begin the investigation again and have Devries undergo hypnosis in an attempt to recover her memories of the assault. She recalls the presence of a fourth man who had not previously been identified. The detectives pursue the new lead and identify the fourth man as Tim Pruiting, a drug dealer connected to the other suspects.

Greevey and Logan find evidence connecting Pruiting to the crime and arrest him. They then trick Metzler and Hanauer into discussing the assault while their conversation is recorded, providing additional evidence against them. Stone proceeds with the prosecution. After a three-week trial, Pruiting is convicted of first-degree rape, while Metzler and Hanauer are convicted of second-degree attempted rape.

== Cast ==
=== Main ===
- George Dzundza as Sergeant Max Greevey
- Chris Noth as Detective Mike Logan
- Dann Florek as Captain Donald Cragen
- Michael Moriarty as Executive A.D.A. Benjamin Stone
- Richard Brooks as A.D.A. Paul Robinette
- Steven Hill as D.A. Adam Schiff

=== Recurring ===
- Mike Hodge as Trial Judge Delano Burns

=== Guest stars ===
- Megan Gallagher as Monica Devries
- Samuel L. Jackson as Defense Attorney Louis Taggert
- Randy Danson as Diane Manso
- Sandy Baron as Mike Lucia
- Al Shannon as Tim Pruiting
- Gil Bellows as Howard Metzler
- Philip Seymour Hoffman as Steven Hanauer
- Kenny Johnston as Ryan Cutrona
- David Green as Dr. Kornfeld
- Robert Heller as Silva
- Philip Hoffman as Hypnotherapist
- Marie Barrientos as Mimi Vitella
- Jean Taylor as Mrs. Hollis
- Phil Stein as Technician
- James Pyduck as Bailiff

== Production ==
“The Violence of Summer” was directed by Don Scardino and written by Michael Duggan. Philip Seymour Hoffman appeared as Steven Hanauer, one of the men accused of assaulting Monica Devries. The episode marked Hoffman’s screen debut; he was credited as “Philip Hoffman.”

Samuel L. Jackson guest-starred as Louis Taggert, the defense attorney representing Steven Hanauer and Howard Metzler. Jackson had already appeared in several films and television productions by the time of the episode, but had not yet achieved the prominence he would gain later in his career.

Gil Bellows guest-starred as Howard Metzler, another of the men accused in the assault. Bellows appeared alongside Philip Seymour Hoffman, who played fellow defendant Steven Hanauer.

Robert Palm and Daniel Sackheim served as producers on the episode. Mike Post composed the music, Constantine Makris was the director of photography, and Drake Silliman edited the episode. Lynn Kressel served as casting director, while Richard Bianchi was the production designer.

== Reception and legacy ==
In a 2025 retrospective for /Film, Witney Seibold praised “The Violence of Summer” and highlighted its treatment of the difficulties faced by sexual-assault victims whose credibility is questioned. Seibold also praised the performances of Samuel L. Jackson and Philip Seymour Hoffman, describing Hoffman’s appearance as an early example of his commitment to a role.

In 2026, TVLine revisited the episode because of the early appearances of Hoffman and Jackson. The publication noted that Hoffman made his screen acting debut in the episode as Steven Hanauer, years before becoming an Academy Award-winning actor, and highlighted the episode as an early point in the careers of both performers.

Robert Palm and Daniel Sackheim served as producers on the episode. Mike Post composed the music, Constantine Makris was the director of photography, and Drake Silliman edited the episode.

Gil Bellows guest-starred as Howard Metzler, another of the men accused in the assault. Bellows appeared alongside Philip Seymour Hoffman, who played fellow defendant Steven Hanauer.
