= Benjamin Stone (Law & Order) =

Fictional TV character

Ben Stone
- Law & Order character
- First appearance: "Prescription for Death"
- Last appearance: "Old Friends"
- Portrayed by: Michael Moriarty

In-universe information
- Family: Peter (son); Pamela (daughter; deceased)
- Seasons: 1, 2, 3, 4

Benjamin "Ben" Stone is a fictional character portrayed by Michael Moriarty in the TV drama Law & Order. He was the Executive Assistant District Attorney for New York County until his resignation at the end of season 4. He appeared in 88 episodes.

== Character overview ==
Stone works in the Manhattan District Attorney's office under Alfred Wentworth (Roy Thinnes, in the pilot episode "Everybody's Favorite Bagman") and Adam Schiff (Steven Hill). He was born in 1943 and raised in an Irish Catholic family. He was raised mostly by his Irish grandmother, his father having been an alcoholic. Stone is divorced and has a son, Peter Stone (Philip Winchester), who was the Deputy Chief of the Special Prosecutions Bureau in Chicago and was the Chief ADA of the Sex Crimes Bureau in New York, and a daughter, Pamela (Amy Korb).

Stone's prosecutorial methods are portrayed as being grounded in moral principles stemming from his Catholic faith. He is shown to be anti-abortion and opposed to the death penalty. He also is a strong advocate of social justice, having marched in the civil rights movement. It is implied that Stone, like actor Moriarty, is a Dartmouth College alumnus, with references to "fraternity row" and New Hampshire. Stone is also likely a graduate of New York University Law School, evidenced by the diplomas on his wall in several episodes.

== Career within the show ==
Stone became Executive Assistant DA in 1985 after convicting con artist and murderer Philip Swann (Željko Ivanek), who years later enters a civil suit against Stone when the validity of the conviction is called into question. Swann is ultimately found guilty, however, and sent back to prison. Stone's assistants have been Paul Robinette (Richard Brooks) and Claire Kincaid (Jill Hennessy).

Stone is a demanding boss who rarely forgives error from his subordinates; in the pilot episode, when Robinette tells Sergeant Max Greevey (George Dzundza) and Detective Mike Logan (Chris Noth) that he has worked with Stone for eight months, Greevey quips, "Must be some kind of record." Nevertheless, in the season four episode "Discord", when Kincaid makes a mistake that nearly results in a rapist being acquitted, he tells her about an incident in his early career in which he accidentally faxed an internal memo to the defense, and gives her another chance.

Stone makes his last appearance in the show in the episode "Old Friends," the final episode of season four. The episode portrays a racketeering case in which the main witness, Ann Madsen (Allison Janney), whose testimony Stone had secured by threatening to send her to prison, is murdered by the Russian Mafia. He feels responsible for her death and resigns from the DA's office. He is succeeded by Jack McCoy (Sam Waterston) as Executive ADA.

== Post-departure ==
Stone is mentioned in the 1996 episode "Custody" as a possible witness against a judge. When his former assistant Paul Robinette, now a defense attorney, wants a judge to recuse himself for past comments showing bias against drug addicts and support for forced sterilization, Robinette threatens to subpoena Stone to testify about the comments, which both he and Stone heard the judge make. Upon hearing of the threat, Schiff informs McCoy that Stone "is traveling in Europe, not available to testify at any hearing." However, the judge by this time has already declared himself "unavailable" to hear the case.

The opening scene of the Law & Order: Special Victims Unit episode "The Undiscovered Country" (aired in 2018) reveals that Stone has died. His successor, Jack McCoy, gives the eulogy at the funeral.

The Special Victims Unit episode "Dear Ben" mentions Stone several times. The plot of the episode revolves around the cold case of a serial rapist whom Stone repeatedly attempted to track down and prosecute, to no avail. Peter reveals that Stone once briefly sent him and Pamela away to stay with relatives after the rapist sent him a Father's Day card, suggesting that he knew where Stone lived. The Special Victims Unit detectives eventually catch the rapist, Edgar Noone (Jude Ciccolella), who is obsessed with the late Stone and believes that he pursued him for so many years because he loved him like a son. Peter and SVU Lieutenant Olivia Benson (Mariska Hargitay) bait Noone by saying that Stone did not care about him at all and only spent so much time on him to protect his victims. As intended, this provokes an enraged Noone to accidentally reveal his guilt.

== Family ==
Stone's son is Peter Stone (Philip Winchester), formerly a Cook County Assistant State's Attorney and lead character on Chicago Justice. Peter first appears on the Chicago P.D. episode "Justice", which is the backdoor pilot for Chicago Justice. Peter also appears in season 19 of Law & Order: Special Victims Unit, and eventually becomes the titular sex crimes bureau's ADA. In several episodes, Peter describes Ben as a distant father who neglected his family in favor of work.

Peter Stone also had a sister, Pamela (Amy Korb), who is introduced in the SVU episode "Send in the Clowns". Pamela has paranoid schizophrenia, and has been hospitalized for most of her life. According to Peter, their father would visit Pamela once a week, and Peter has continued the visits since their father's death. She is murdered by sex traffickers in the SVU episode "Remember Me Too".

== Reason for departure ==
Stone's departure from Law & Order stemmed from actor Michael Moriarty's dispute with the network and U.S. Attorney General Janet Reno, who in 1993 began promoting legislation to limit portrayals of violence on television. Moriarty, who was outspoken against Reno and what he felt was government censorship, was scheduled to appear on NBC shows Today and Now with Tom Brokaw and Katie Couric, but both ended up canceled. Moriarty had already taped his segment for Now. For his Today show appearance, during which he was scheduled to debate Senator Kent Conrad, he was replaced by FCC chairman Reed Hundt. Both appearances were scheduled to air on January 26, 1994. Moriarty submitted his resignation to producer series creator Dick Wolf on January 25, 1994, and his departure was written into the series.

== Credits ==
Seasons	Years	Episodes																					
Seasons	Years	1	2	3	4	5	6	7	8	9	10	11	12	13	14	15	16	17	18	19	20	21	22
1	1990–91																						
2	1991–92																						
3	1992–93																						
4	1993–94																						
Seasons	Years	1	2	3	4	5	6	7	8	9	10	11	12	13	14	15	16	17	18	19	20	21	22
Seasons	Years	Episodes																					

Regular cast

×	Regular cast + no appearance

Recurring cast

No credit + no appearance
