= Ralph Cosham =

American actor (1936–2014)

- Cosham in 2013
- Born: 25 February 1936; Eastbourne, Sussex, United Kingdom
- Died: 30 September 2014 (aged 78); Reston, Virginia, United States
- Years active: 1970s–2014

Ralph Howard Cosham (25 February 1936 – 30 September 2014) was a British-born American actor and narrator. Cosham also recorded under the name Geoffrey Howard. He was a member of the acting companies of the Washington Theatre Club, the Folger Shakespeare Library, Arena Stage and the Shakespeare Theater all in Washington, D.C. Several of his works were awarded "Audio Best of the Year" by Publishers Weekly. Cosham worked as a journalist before he became an actor in the 1970s.

== Career ==
In early 1964, Panther Pictorial contracted with United Press International to prepare a special souvenir magazine of The Beatles' first visit to America. UPI took the photos and assigned English immigrant Cosham to write the accompanying text. His interviews with concertgoers and reporting was published as The Beatles at Carnegie Hall. It was Carnegie Hall's first ever rock concert ("set").

In voice acting he was featured in the video game The Elder Scrolls IV: Oblivion as the Breton males, including characters such as Jauffre, the Grandmaster of the Blades, and Vicente Valtieri. Cosham also played Dr. Guervich in Death Without Consent (2005) and he played the voice part "townspeople 3" in Pirates of the Caribbean (2003).

In acting he was a driver in Shadow Conspiracy (1997); Supreme Court Justice Jensen in The Pelican Brief (1993), Judge Assel Steward in Suspect (1987); a Marine Lieutenant in Starman (1984); and played the part of Braddock's Captain in the TV mini-series George Washington (1984).

As a book narrator, Cosham (or as Howard) narrated over 100 books since 1992. Some titles include The Time Machine by H. G. Wells, The Castle by Franz Kafka, The Secret Agent (1996), Heart of Darkness (2002), Frankenstein (2002), Around the World in Eighty Days (2003), Alice in Wonderland (2004), Watership Down (2010), Dead Man's Chest (2001 novel by Roger Johnson, narrated in 2006), King Leopold's Ghost, Postwar: A History of Europe Since 1945, numerous works of C.S. Lewis including The Space Trilogy, Miracles, Mere Christianity, The Problem of Pain and The Screwtape Letters, as well as a collection of American short stories titled The American Experience: A Collection of Great American Stories (2004).

Cosham was the first narrator for a series of mysteries written by Louise Penny; he won AudioFile Earphones and Library Journal awards for best audiobook and the Mystery Audie Award in 2013 for The Beautiful Mystery. Cosham recorded the first ten books of the series. After Cosham's death, Robert Bathurst narrated future books.

== Personal life and death ==
Cosham lived in Reston, Virginia. He was married to Beverly Cosham, an actress and singer.

Cosham died of an illness on 30 September 2014 at his home in Reston, at the age of 78.

== Filmography ==
| Year | Title | Role | Notes |
|---|---|---|---|
| 1983 | Kennedy | Dr. Clark | TV mini-series, 5 episodes |
| 1984 | George Washington | Braddock's Captain | TV mini-series |
| 1984 | Starman | Marine Lieutenant | |
| 1987 | Suspect | Judge Assel Stewart | |
| 1991 | A Woman Named Jackie | Dr. Wilson | TV mini-series |
| 1993 | The Pelican Brief | Justice Jensen | |
| 1997 | Shadow Conspiracy | Driver | |
| 2003 | Pirates of the Caribbean | Townspeople 3 | Video game, voice only |
| 2006 | The Elder Scrolls IV: Oblivion | Jauffre / Vicente Valtieri / Male Bretons | Video game, voice only |
| 2007 | Death Without Consent | Dr. Guervich | Final film role |
