= Amore! =

1993 film by Lorenzo Doumani

- Directed by: Lorenzo Doumani
- Written by: Lorenzo Doumani
- Produced by: Joey DePinto; Edward Doumani; Lorenzo Doumani
- Starring: Jack Scalia; Kathy Ireland; George Hamilton; Norm Crosby; James Doohan; Brenda Epperson; Elliott Gould; Katherine Helmond
- Cinematography: Thomas Del Ruth
- Edited by: Debra Bard
- Music by: Harry Manfredini
- Release date: November 2, 1993
- Language: English

Amore! is a 1993 comedy film directed by Lorenzo Doumani and starring Jack Scalia and Kathy Ireland. Its music score was created by Harry Manfredini.

== Plot ==
Saul Schwartz is a bored New York businessman who decides to change his life to become a Hollywood movie star but finds it harder than he expected.

== Cast ==
- Jack Scalia as Saul Schwartz
- Kathy Ireland as Taylor Christopher
- Katherine Helmond as Mildred Schwartz
- Elliott Gould as George Levine
- George Hamilton as Rudolpho Carbonera
- James Doohan as Dr. Landon
- Frank Gorshin as Asino
- Brenda Epperson as Louise Armstrong
- Norm Crosby as Shlomo Schwartz
- Betsy Russell as Cheryl Schwartz
- Arlene Golonka as Acting Coach
- Mother Love as "Cookie"
- Allan Rich as Studio Executive
- Ava Cadell as Mrs. Scarborough
