= Light and the Sufferer =

- Directed by: Christopher Peditto
- Written by: Christopher Peditto; Jonathan Lethem
- Produced by: Irene Cagen; Fredrik Carlström; Jason Diamond; Julie Gonthier; David Marks; Christopher Peditto; Nicole Rodney
- Starring: Paul Dano; Paz de la Huerta; Michael Esper; Paul D'Amato
- Cinematography: Lana Bernberg
- Edited by: Jason Diamond; Josh Diamond
- Music by: Mark Nelson
- Distributed by: Vivendi Entertainment; Lightyear Entertainment
- Release dates: October 2, 2007 (Edmonton International Film Festival); September 9, 2008 (United States)
- Running time: 70 minutes
- Country: United States
- Language: English

Light and the Sufferer is a 2007 American science fiction film starring Paul Dano, Paz de la Huerta, Michael Esper, and Paul D'Amato and directed by Christopher Peditto. It is based on a short story by Jonathan Lethem.

The film is about two brothers who try to leave New York City for a new life in California, only to find their plans and lives changed forever by the appearance of a mysterious alien.
