= Brenda Epperson =

American actress and singer (born 1865)

- Born: September 9, 1965 (age 60); Hollywood, California, U.S.
- Education: DePauw University
- Occupations: Actress and singer
- Years active: 1987–present
- Known for: Ashley Abbott – The Young and the Restless
- Parent(s): Sherry Epperson-Pippin & Don Epperson
- Website: https://brendaepperson.com

Brenda Epperson (born September 9, 1965) is an American actress and singer. Epperson is best known for being the second actress to portray the character of Ashley Abbott on the CBS daytime drama The Young and the Restless.

== Biography ==
Her father, Don Epperson, was both a country singer and a co-star of Big Jake with John Wayne. After his sudden death in 1973, Brenda's mother was left to raise two daughters. Brenda released her published book Rise Up! in 2021.

When Eileen Davidson decided to quit The Young and the Restless in 1988, Epperson was chosen to replace Davidson because they looked so similar to one another. At the time, Epperson was working as a waitress with a caterer.

After leaving Y&R, Epperson then went on sign with Sony Tri-Star Music, was chosen as the opening act for Lionel Richie, and toured Europe.

Before May 2021 Epperson was filming the 5th season of the BET+ series The Rich and the Ruthless where she played the character Edith Norman. Epperson is also the host of the podcast Morning Cup of Faith, Epperson is a host on the UStream series, Actors-E Chat, where she interviews other celebrities. In October 2013, she began coordinating the Ascend Conference for women. She is married to Terry Moore, a real estate mogul and developer, and has had two more daughters with him for a total of three girls.

In March 2013, she released a 3-song EP titled, Take Time, on her own label. That same year, Epperson joined the board of directors at Idle Tuesdays Recording Studio, a non-profit record label founded by Emily Hibard and based in Los Angeles. Epperson is the founding co-director of a women's conference, with the website AscendWomen.org.

== Filmography ==
- The Bold and the Beautiful (1987) (Taxi Bar Guest)
- The Young and the Restless – Ashley Abbott (#2) (5 December 1988 to 21 December 1995)
- Amore! (1993)
- The Misery Brothers (1995)
- Storybook (1995)
- The Nanny (1997) (guest star)
- Bug Buster (1998)
- Follow Your Heart (1999)
- Passions – Crystal Harris (2000) (recurring role)
- Vegas, City of Dreams (2001)
- Spy TV (2001) (reality show) (guest star)
- Windfall (2003) (TV movie)
- The Blue Light (2004) (TV movie)
- Day Of Miracles (direct-to-video documentary) (2005)
- Instant Recall (2010) (game show) (guest star)
- Promises Written in Water (2010)
- Trash or Treasure Sizzle Reel (2013) (reality show) (co-host)
- Celebrity Ghost Stories (2013) (herself)
- The Rich and the Ruthless (2017–) (TV series)(BET+)
