= Mason Adams =

American actor (1919–2005)

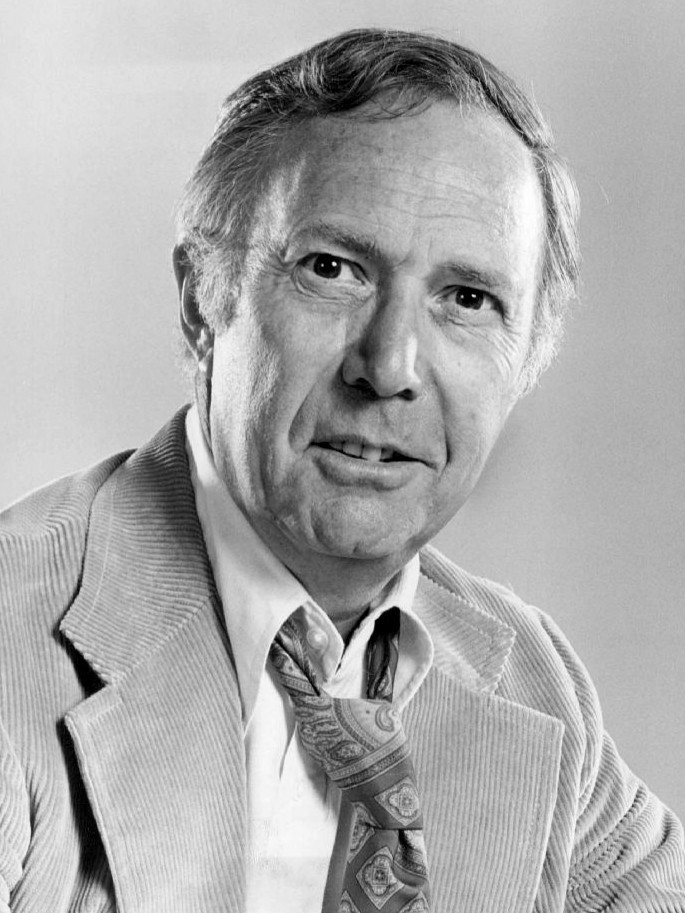
- Adams in 1977
- Born: February 26, 1919; Brooklyn, New York, U.S.
- Died: April 26, 2005 (aged 86); Manhattan, New York, U.S.
- Education: University of Wisconsin, Madison (BA, MA)
- Occupation: Actor
- Years active: 1940–2003
- Spouse: Margot Feinberg (m. 1957)
- Children: 2

Mason Adams (born Mason Abrams; February 26, 1919 – April 26, 2005) was an American actor. From the late 1940s until the early 1970s, he was heard in numerous radio programs and voiceovers for countless television commercials, the latter of which he resumed in the 1980s and 1990s. In the early 1970s, he moved into acting and from 1977 to 1983 held perhaps his best-known role, that of Managing Editor Charlie Hume on Lou Grant. He also acted in numerous other television and movie roles, most prominently Omen III: The Final Conflict (1981) and F/X (1986).

== Early life ==
Adams was born in Brooklyn, New York, and grew up in Sheepshead Bay. His father, Morris Abrams, was an immigrant from Russia and the owner of a company that made machinery and factory tools. His mother, the former Freda Sugarman, was also an immigrant from Russia. He studied at the University of Wisconsin, earning a bachelor’s degree in theater and speech in 1940, and a master’s degree in theater arts in 1941. He later studied acting at New York City's Neighborhood Playhouse School of the Theatre, where he also taught speech. He made his stage debut in 1940, appearing in summer stock at Baltimore's Hilltop Theater.

== Career ==
Adams was heard on many radio programs during Radio's Golden Age. A notable recurring role of his was that of Pepper Young in Pepper Young's Family, which aired from 1947 to 1959. He also portrayed the deadly Nazi Atom Man in a classic 1945 serial on the radio version of The Adventures of Superman.

During the '60s, Adams was ubiquitous as a voiceover actor in television commercials for foods and household products, most notably for Chiffon margarine, Crest toothpaste ("Helps stop cavities before they start") and French's food products (French's Mustard was "the best thing that happened since man first bit dog"). He also did the vocal part of the television commercials for Smucker's preserves ("With a name like Smucker's, it has to be good!"), a role he resumed in his later years.

His voiceover work resumed in the '80s when he began providing the voiceover for Cadbury's Creme Eggs, which were advertised on television with Adams' catchy slogan, "Nobunny knows Easter better than him [the Cadbury Bunny]." Also in the '80s, Adams did voiceover TV commercials for Sherwin-Williams Paints, and radio commercials for the Salvation Army. In addition, Adams was the narrator for Kix commercials in the '90s and a few Dentyne and Swanson commercials. He was also the announcer for a 1992 WCBS-TV news promotion and a 1986 Lysol commercial. In the early '90s, he narrated Frontiers of Flight, a Discovery Channel series on milestones of aviation.

During the 1970s, Adams was a co-star of the NBC soap opera Another World, and in 1976, he was in the original 1976 Broadway cast for Checking Out. Following that, he landed perhaps his most famous role, Managing Editor Charlie Hume, in the television series Lou Grant, which aired from 1977 to 1982. Appearing in the show for its entire run, he landed three straight Emmy Award nominations for Best Supporting Actor in 1979, 1980, and 1981, each year alongside his Lou Grant co-star Robert Walden, who played reporter Joe Rossi. During his run on Lou Grant, Adams performed perhaps his most often-seen role, as the US president in Omen III: The Final Conflict (1981). He also appeared in popular TV movies, such as The Deadliest Season (1977), Revenge of the Stepford Wives (1980), and The Kid with the Broken Halo (1982).

In 1983, Adams joined The Mirror Theater Ltd's repertory company for their first season, appearing in Paradise Lost, Rain, Inheritors, and The Hasty Heart. This season was presented initially off-off-Broadway at the Real Stage Acting School, and was moved off-Broadway to the Theatre at St. Peter's Church. In 1986, he starred as Col. Edward Mason, one of his most famous feature-film roles, in the movie F/X starring Bryan Brown and Brian Dennehy, and in 1991, he appeared in the action movie Toy Soldiers.

In 1993, Adams starred as Walter Warner Sr., in the movie Son in Law starring Pauly Shore, and then had roles in Houseguest (1995), Touch (1997), and The Lesser Evil (1998). In the 1998 HBO miniseries From the Earth to the Moon, he played Senator Clinton P. Anderson. His final role was in the series finale of Oz.

In the 1990s, Adams narrated several of the Lilian Jackson Braun audiobook mysteries and a Mary Higgins Clark audiobook.

=== Radio career ===
Mason Adams played many characters in Old-Time Radio programs, among them:

- The Adventures of Ellery Queen
- The Adventures of Superman
- Big Sister
- Big Town
- CBS Radio Mystery Theater
- The Crime Club
- Exploring Tomorrow
- Gasoline Alley
- Grand Central Station
- Inner Sanctum
- The Mysterious Traveler
- The NBC Radio Theatre
- Nick Carter, Master Detective
- Pepper Young's Family
- Proudly We Hail
- Suspense
- The Chase
- This Is My Story
- X Minus One
- Yours Truly, Johnny Dollar
- Corporal Eddie on a series of public-announcement shows for the U.S. Army

== Christmas recording ==
Adams played Mack in the episode "Miracle for Christmas" of the Grand Central Station radio series. In the story, Mack is an ambulance driver in a poor neighborhood, who drives an intern who turns out to be more than a doctor. It was repeated for six years out of popularity, and is still considered a classic from the Radio Golden Era.

Adams achieved a bit of holiday immortality by taking part in a comedy spoof of "The Twelve Days of Christmas", called "The Chickens Are in the Chimes" (RCA Victor 74-8277, 1963). Recorded by Sascha Burland and the Skipjack Choir, with Adams as the lead voice, this recording was issued in 1963 on a 45 rpm record, but has never been released on compact disc. The recording for the "B" side was "Have Yourself a Merry Little Christmas". "The Chickens Are in the Chimes" has often been played over radio stations at Christmas, and became a holiday favorite ever since.

== Personal life and death ==
Adams was the older brother of Dr. Herbert L. Abrams, a radiologist who helped in the founding of International Physicians for the Prevention of Nuclear War, which was awarded the Nobel Peace Prize in 1985.

Adams married Margot Fineberg in 1958. The couple had a daughter, Betsy, and a son, Bill. Adams died on April 26, 2005, from natural causes.

== Filmography ==
=== Film ===
Year	Title	Role	Notes
1947	Mr. Bell	Thomas Watson	Short Film
1975	The Happy Hooker	The Banker with Chris	
1976	God Told Me To	Obstetrician	
1977	Raggedy Ann & Andy: A Musical Adventure	Grandpa (voice)	
1981	Omen III: The Final Conflict	President	
1986	F/X	Colonel Mason	
1991	Toy Soldiers	Deputy Director Brown	
1993	Son in Law	Walter Warner Sr.	
1995	Houseguest	Mr. Pike	
1995	Not of This Earth	Dr. Rochelle	
1997	Touch	Father Nestor	
1997	Hudson River Blues	Grandpa	
1998	The Lesser Evil	Derek's Father	
1999	Life Among the Cannibals	Francis	

=== Television ===
Year	Title	Role	Notes
1951	Love of Life	Dr. Carl Westheimer	
1954	The Man Behind the Badge	Conrad	Episode: "The Case of the Phantom Fire"
1955	Robert Montgomery Presents	Mr. Watkins	Episode: "A Matter of Dignity"
1955	Armstrong Circle Theatre		Episode: "TV or Not TV"
1958	Decoy	Bill Wendover	Episode: "Odds Against the Jockey"
1958	The Phil Silvers Show	GI Engineer Walter Maxwell	Episode: "Bilko the Genius"; uncredited
1959	Startime	Radio Actor	Episode: "The Wonderful World of Entertainment"
1959	Deadline	Rossoff	Episode: "The Blue Dahlia"
1964	Another World	Dr. Frank Prescott	
1969	Where the Heart Is	Judge Halstad	
1977	The Deadliest Season	Bill Cavins	TV movie
1977—1982	Lou Grant	Charlie Hume	114 episodes
1979	And Baby Makes Six	Dr. Eliot Losen	TV movie
1979	A Shining Season	Dr. Ed Johnson	TV movie
1980	The Last Resort	Dr. Sternhagen	Episode: "Is There a Doctor in the House?"
1980	Flamingo Road	Elmo Tyson	Episode: "Pilot"
1980	Murder Can Hurt You!	Willie the Wino	TV movie
1980	Revenge of the Stepford Wives	Wally	TV movie
1981	Rise and Shine		Episode: "Pilot"
1981	The Love Boat	Richard Simmons	Episode: "Country Blues / Daddy's Little Girl / Jackpot"
1981	Peking Encounter	Clyde	TV movie
1982	The Kid with the Broken Halo	Harry Tannenbaum	TV movie
1982	The Grinch Grinches the Cat in the Hat	The Cat in the Hat / Narrator (voice)	TV Short
1983	Freedom to Speak		7 episodes
1983	Adam	Ray Mellette	TV movie
1983	Great Day	Narrator (voice)	TV movie
1984	Passions	Ron Sandler	TV movie
1984	American Playhouse	Ford	Episode: "Solomon Northup's Odyssey"
1984	The Night They Saved Christmas	Sumner Murdock	TV movie
1985	CBS Storybreak	Narrator (voice)	Episode: "Arnold of the Ducks"
1986	Under Siege	Geoffrey Wiggins	TV movie
1986	Morningstar/Eveningstar	Gordon Blair	7 episodes
1986	Walt Disney World: A Dream Come True	Narrator	TV special
1986	You Are the Jury	Dr. Parke	Episode: "The State of Arizona vs. Dr. Evan Blake"
1986	Northstar	Dr. Karl Janss	TV movie
1986	Who Is Julia?	Dr. Gordon	TV movie
1986	Rage of Angels: The Story Continues	Father Francis Ryan	TV movie
1986	Family Ties	Professor Lloyd Rhodes	Episode: "Paper Lion"
1987	The Hope Division	Peter Braden	TV movie
1988	Matlock	Bob Ranier	Episode: "The Heiress"
1989	Murder, She Wrote	Roger Philby	Episode: "The Search for Peter Kerry"
1989	A Quiet Conspiracy	General Luther B. Novak	Episode: "Episode #1.1"
1989	Knight & Daye	Everett Daye	7 episodes
1989	It All Started with a Mouse: The Disney Story	Narrator (voice)	TV movie
1990	Whip Valentine		TV movie
1990	WIOU	Hal Krasner	Episode: "Do the Wrong Thing"
1990	Monsters	Doctor	Episode: "A New Woman"
1991	Perry Mason: The Case of the Maligned Mobster	Frank Halloran	TV movie
1991	Family Matters	Judge Vance	Episode: "Citizen's Court"
1991	Rockenwagner	Rory Carmichael	TV movie
1992	Civil Wars	Judge Toffinetti	Episode: "Chute First, Ask Questions Later"
1992	Screenplay	Bob Rutherford	Episode: "Buying a Landslide"
1992	Jonathan: The Boy Nobody Wanted	Judge Colbert	TV movie
1993	Class of '96	President Harris	Episode: "Pilot"
1994	Assault at West Point: The Court-Martial of Johnson Whittaker	Henry D. Hyde	TV movie
1997	Murder One	Sidney Pomerantz	Episode: "Chapter Thirteen, Year Two"
1997	Murder One: Diary of a Serial Killer	Sidney Pomerantz	6 episodes; Mini series
1997	Metropolitan Hospital		TV movie
1998	From the Earth to the Moon	Clinton Anderson	Episode: "Apollo One"
1998	Beyond Belief: Fact or Fiction	Mr. Trapwell	2 episodes
1999	The West Wing	Justice Joseph Crouch	Episode: "The Short List"
2003	Oz	Mr. Hoyt	Episode: "Exeunt Omnes"; final role
