= The Rich and the Ruthless =

American television series

- Genre: Comedy; Satire
- Created by: Victoria Rowell
- Starring: Victoria Rowell; Richard Brooks; Valenzia Algarin; Elaine Ballace; Hunter Bodine; Elizabeth J. Carlisle; Michael Colyar; Starletta DuPois; Brenda Epperson; Carlo Mendez; Robert Ri'chard; Alesha Renee; Irene Roseen; Mykel Shannon Jenkins; Shadoe Stevens; Chrystale Wilson; Gabrielle Sanalitro; Akilah Releford; Kimberlin Brown; JoNell Kennedy; Dawnn Lewis
- Country of origin: United States
- Original language: English
- No. of seasons: 4
- No. of episodes: 23

Production
- Executive producer: Victoria Rowell
- Running time: 22 minutes
- Production company: Days Ferry Productions

Original release
- Network: Urban Movie Channel (seasons 1–3); BET+ (season 4)
- Release: July 28, 2017 – May 13, 2021

The Rich and the Ruthless is an American television comedy series created, produced and directed by Victoria Rowell. The series stars Rowell and Richard Brooks. The series is loosely based on Rowell's novels Secrets of a Soap Opera Diva and The Young and the Ruthless, and offers a behind-the-scenes look at the fictional soap opera.

The six-episode first season premiered on the streaming service Allblk on July 28, 2017. On August 24, 2017, the series was renewed for a second season. The third season premiered on May 23, 2019. The fourth season moved to BET+ and premiered on May 13, 2021.

The series received multiple awards and nominations, include Daytime Emmy Award nomination for an Outstanding Lead Actor in a Digital Daytime Drama Series for Brooks in 2018. In 2018 and 2019, the series won Indie Series Awards for Best Ensemble in a Comedy.

== Cast and characters ==
- Victoria Rowell as Kitty Barringer
- Richard Brooks as Augustus Barringer
- Valenzia Algarin as Veronica Barringer
- Elaine Ballace as Fern
- Hunter Bodine as Randall Roberts
- Elizabeth J. Carlisle as Emmy Abernathy
- Michael Colyar as Willie Turner
- Starletta DuPois as Grandma Jones
- Brenda Epperson as Edith Norman
- Carlo Mendez as Kurt
- Robert Ri'chard as Max Barringer
- Alesha Renee as Calysta Jeffries
- Irene Roseen as Maeve Fielding
- Mykel Shannon Jenkins as Derrick Taylor
- Shadoe Stevens as Phillip McQueen
- Chrystale Wilson as Alison Fairchild Roberts
- Gabrielle Sanalitro as Tamara
- Akilah Releford as Ivy
- Kimberlin Brown as Dr. Maya Cooper
- JoNell Kennedy as Earthaletta
- Dawnn Lewis as Beth

== Episodes ==
Season	Episodes	Originally released		
Season	Episodes	First released	Last released	Network
1	6	July 21, 2017	August 25, 2017	Urban Movie Channel
2	6	June 14, 2018	July 19, 2018	Urban Movie Channel
3	6	May 23, 2019	June 27, 2019	Urban Movie Channel
4	5	May 13, 2021		BET+

=== Season 1 (2017) ===
No. overall	No. in season	Title	Directed by	Written by	Original release date
1	1	"Episode 1"	Unknown	Unknown	July 21, 2017
2	2	"Episode 2"	Unknown	Unknown	July 28, 2017
3	3	"Episode 3"	Unknown	Unknown	August 4, 2017
4	4	"Episode 4"	Unknown	Unknown	August 11, 2017
5	5	"Episode 5"	Unknown	Unknown	August 18, 2017
6	6	"Episode 6"	Unknown	Unknown	August 25, 2017

=== Season 2 (2018) ===
No. overall	No. in season	Title	Directed by	Written by	Original release date
7	1	"Episode 1"	Unknown	Unknown	June 14, 2018
8	2	"Episode 2"	Unknown	Unknown	June 21, 2018
9	3	"Episode 3"	Unknown	Unknown	June 28, 2018
10	4	"Episode 4"	Unknown	Unknown	July 5, 2018
11	5	"Episode 5"	Unknown	Unknown	July 12, 2018
12	6	"Episode 6"	Unknown	Unknown	July 19, 2018

=== Season 3 (2019) ===
No. overall	No. in season	Title	Directed by	Written by	Original release date
13	1	"Episode 1"	Unknown	Unknown	May 23, 2019
14	2	"Episode 2"	Unknown	Unknown	May 30, 2019
15	3	"Episode 3"	Unknown	Unknown	June 6, 2019
16	4	"Episode 4"	Unknown	Unknown	June 13, 2019
17	5	"Episode 5"	Unknown	Unknown	June 20, 2019
18	6	"Episode 6"	Unknown	Unknown	June 27, 2019

=== Season 4 (2021) ===
No. overall	No. in season	Title	Directed by	Written by	Original release date
19	1	"Episode 1"	Unknown	Unknown	May 13, 2021
20	2	"Episode 2"	Unknown	Unknown	May 13, 2021
21	3	"Episode 3"	Unknown	Unknown	May 13, 2021
22	4	"Episode 4"	Unknown	Unknown	May 13, 2021
23	5	"Episode 5"	Unknown	Unknown	May 13, 2021
