= The Deadliest Season =

- Official release poster
- Genre: Drama; Sport
- Written by: Ernest Kinoy
- Directed by: Robert Markowitz
- Starring: Michael Moriarty; Kevin Conway; Meryl Streep
- Music by: Dick Hyman
- Country of origin: United States
- Original language: English

Production
- Executive producer: Herbert Brodkin
- Producer: Robert Berger
- Production location: Hartford, Connecticut
- Cinematography: Alan Metzger
- Editor: Stephen A. Rotter
- Running time: 98 minutes
- Production company: Titus Productions

Original release
- Network: CBS
- Release: March 16, 1977

The Deadliest Season is a 1977 American made-for-television sports drama film aired on CBS on March 16, 1977. It was directed by Robert Markowitz, written by Ernest Kinoy and produced by Titus Productions. The film stars Michael Moriarty, Kevin Conway and Meryl Streep.

== Plot ==
Gerry Miller (Michael Moriarty) is a professional ice hockey defenseman relegated to the minor leagues because his play is not aggressive enough. In an effort to get back to the majors, he plays dirty and gets into fights on the ice, which gets him back to the majors. His aggressive play results in the death of a former friend (Paul D'Amato) playing for an opposing team who sustained a ruptured spleen during a game. Miller appears largely indifferent to the situation, appearing to view it as a normal part of playing top-level ice hockey. He is charged with aggravated assault with a deadly weapon by the district attorney and is under pressure to accept a plea bargain while his team and the league dissociate themselves from the scandal. He is defended by George Graff (Kevin Conway), a disabled lawyer who is one of the few people that believes he can get Miller exonerated in court.

== Cast ==
- Michael Moriarty as Gerry Miller
- Kevin Conway as George Graff
- Meryl Streep as Sharon Miller
- Sully Boyar as Tom Feeney
- Jill Eikenberry as Carole Eskanazi
- Walter McGinn as District Attorney Horace Meade
- Mason Adams as Bill Cairns
- Paul D'Amato as Dave Eskanazi
- Ron Weyland as Judge Reinhardt
- Frank Bongiorno as Rene Beauvois
- Mel Boudrot as Coach Bryant
- Rudy Hornish as Walters
- Eddie Moran as Eddie Miller
- Dino Narizzano as Referee Merritt
- Alan North as Detective Forscher
- George Petrie as President MacCloud
- Tom Quinn as Trainer Doyle
- Bob Dio as Kenny
- Suzanne Ford as Miss Converse
- D.H. Robinson as Pete
- Jerry Reid as Coach MacInerny
- Andrew Duggan as Al Miller
- Patrick O'Neal as Bertram Fowler

In The Deadliest Season, Michael Moriarty plays the main character. Kevin Conway also starred in this film. Sully Boyar, Jill Eikenberry, Walter McGinn, Andrew Duggan, Paul D'Amato and Mason Adams also appeared on The Deadliest Season. Conway played the attorney who defended Mortiarty's character. Adams' appearance as the team owner in the film helped land him a role in Lou Grant.

The film was written by Ernest Kinoy, who had already written several television dramas by that time. It was directed by Robert Markowitz, and produced by Titus Productions. Meryl Streep made her television debut. She also made her film debut role for Julia in the same year. Streep, playing Moriarty's wife, received fifth billing in what was her first role.

== Reception ==
John J. O'Connor of The New York Times praised the film as "an exceptionally impressive production." He complimented Moriarty for bringing "an incredible range of shading and sensitivity to his portrayal of the well‐meaning but confused athlete," Conway for being "admirably forceful, carefully avoiding cheap sentiment" and film editor Stephen A. Rotter and cinematographer Alan Metzger for having "captured the essence of their hockey sequences with stunning fidelity."

== Airing ==
The Deadliest Season was a 98-minute-long courtroom and sports drama made-for-TV movie that originally aired in the United States on CBS in 1977. In Canada, the movie aired in August 1979 on CBC. In Australia, the film first aired in November 1980, and later aired on March 23, 1982, on ATN7. In 1984, it reran in New York on Channel 2. It re-ran on television in Alaska in November 1986.

== See also ==
- List of films about ice hockey
