= La Strada (musical) =

- Original Broadway Windowcard
- Music: Lionel Bart; Elliot Lawrence
- Lyrics: Lionel Bart; Martin Charnin
- Book: Charles K. Peck, Jr.
- Basis: La Strada by Federico Fellini; Tullio Pinelli; Ennio Flaiano
- Productions: 1969 Broadway

La Strada is a musical with lyrics and music by Lionel Bart, with additional lyrics by Martin Charnin and additional music by Elliot Lawrence. It is based on the 1954 film of the same name by Federico Fellini, Tullio Pinelli and Ennio Flaiano. Bart wrote the score in 1967 and made a demonstration recording, although the musical was not produced until 1969, when it was famously cancelled after just one performance. The musical's book was written by Charles K. Peck, Jr., who also produced it on Broadway.

== Plot summary ==
The play follows the story of the film of the same name. Gelsomina, a young girl, is sold by her impoverished mother to a brutish circus strongman, Zampanò, to be his assistant. She shows her abilities as a clown and soon becomes the star of the show. She falls in love with Zampanò, despite his abuse of her. But tragedy strikes when she befriends Mario, a circus clown, who gives her advice and friendship, and Zampanò kills him in a jealous fit. Zampanò eventually leaves Gelsomina, who still loves him, to die on the road.

== Characters and original Broadway cast ==
- Gelsomina – Bernadette Peters
- Zampano – Stephen Pearlman
- Mother – Anne Hegira
- Mario – Larry Kert
- Elsa – Lisa Belleran
- Eva – Mary Ann Robbins
- Sophia – Susan Goeppinger
- Castra – Lucille Patton

== Musical numbers ==
Act I

- Seagull, Starfish, Pebble – Gelsomina
- The Great Zampano – Gelsomina and Zampano
- What's Going on Inside? – Zampano
- Belonging – Gelsomina
- Wedding Dance – Company
- I Don't Like You – Gelsomina
- Encounters – Gelsomina and Company
- There's a Circus in Town – Mario
- You're Musical – Mario and Gelsomina
- Only More! – Gelsomina

Act II

- What a Man – Gelsomina and Mama Lambrini
- Everything Needs Something – Gelsomina
- Sooner or Later – Mario
- Sooner or Later (reprise) – Gelsomina
- Belonging (reprise) – Gelsomina
- The End of the Road – Company

== Production, background and recordings ==
Lionel Bart and Chris Curtis produced a concept album of the proposed show in 1967 with Madeline Bell as Gelsomina. The musical had out-of-town tryouts at the Fisher Theatre in Detroit, Michigan starting on October 27, 1969. La Strada opened on December 14, 1969 at the Lunt-Fontanne Theatre on Broadway after 14 previews. The show was directed by Alan Schneider, with choreography by Alvin Ailey and Joyce Trisler. It closed the same night, losing $650,000.

In discussing La Strada's problems, Steven Suskin wrote that Bart apparently did not go to the United States to assist during rehearsals, and neither the director nor the choreographers had previously done a Broadway musical. Peters confirmed that Bart never worked on the show in New York: "The script really wasn't ready, and Lionel Bart was never coming over. Marty Charnin and his partner at the time [Lawrence] rewrote it." Ken Mandelbaum wrote about La Strada in his book, Not Since Carrie: Forty Years of Broadway Flops. During try-outs, Vincent Beck as Zampano, the strongman, was replaced. All but three of the original songs from the concept album were replaced. Furthermore, "it followed a relentlessly bleak, tragic screenplay, [and] it emerged as one of the most depressing musicals ever. ... Bernadette Peters, in her first Broadway lead, did not let the show down. ... The score was not bad, particularly Peters' haunting opening "Seagull, Starfish, Pebble", written by Lawrence and Charnin".

Although bootleg live recordings of the score are known to exist, no original cast album was commercially released. Two songs from the show were later included on an EP titled Martin Charnin's Mini Album: 5 Great Songs from Not-So-Great Shows (1976). One of these songs, "Sooner or Later" was performed by Larry Kert, who had been an original cast member. A recording of "Starfish", as performed by Judy Kuhn, was included on the anthology Unsung Musicals, released by Varèse Sarabande in 1994.

== Critical responses ==
In his review in The New York Times, Clive Barnes wrote that the book was superficial and the music bland and trite. However, he praised Peters, writing "In a different show the birdlike and croaky Bernadette Peters would have become a star overnight."

== Sources ==
- Mandelbaum, Ken (1991), "Not Since Carrie: Forty Years of Broadway Flops", St. Martin's Press, ISBN 0-312-06428-4
