= Paul Sparer =

American character actor

- Born: Paul Israel Sparer; December 19, 1923; Boston, Massachusetts, U.S.
- Died: November 19, 1999 (aged 75); Manhattan, New York, U.S.
- Education: Harvard University
- Occupation: Character actor
- Spouse: Nancy Marchand (m. 1951)

Paul Israel Sparer (December 19, 1923 – November 19, 1999) was an American character actor.

== Early years ==
Sparer was born on December 19, 1923, in Boston, Massachusetts. He graduated cum laude from Harvard University.

== Career ==
Sparer's Broadway credits include Love's Labour's Lost (1953), The Merchant of Venice (1953), Saint Joan (1956), Much Ado About Nothing (1959), Cut of the Axe (1960), A Cook for Mr. General (1961), Ross (1961), After the Rain (1967), The Price (1968), In the Matter of J. Robert Oppenheimer (1969), Operation Sidewinder (1970), Much Ado About Nothing (1972), In Praise of Love (1974), Zalmen or The Madness of God (1976), Poor Murderer (1976), Saint Joan (1977), Medea (1982), Awake and Sing! (1984), and Shadowlands (1990).

Sparer appeared as Rex Cooper in the soap operas Somerset and Another World. He was also known for narrating the anthology TV series Tales from the Darkside. His film roles include Loving and The House on Carroll Street while television appearances include Armstrong Circle Theatre, Kojak, The Adams Chronicles, Lou Grant and Spenser: For Hire. He also appeared in the first episode of Law & Order, "Prescription for Death".

Sparer narrated the unabridged audiobook of Kahlil Gibran's 1923 book The Prophet, first published in 1985 and reissued in 2006.

== Personal life ==
Sparer was born in Boston, Massachusetts to a Jewish family. He was married to actress Nancy Marchand and had three children and seven grandchildren. Sparer died of cancer in Manhattan on November 19, 1999.

Marchand died of lung cancer half a year later on June 18, 2000, one day before she was to turn 72.

== Filmography ==
Year	Title	Role	Notes
1970	Loving	Marve	
1978	King of the Gypsies	Dave's Doctor	
1987	Hiding Out	Judge	
1988	The House on Carroll Street	Randolph Slote	
1990	Law and Order	Dr. Edward Auster	Episode 1, "Prescription for Death"
