= Paul D'Amato (actor) =

American actor (1949–2024)

- D'Amato in Slap Shot (1977)
- Born: October 2, 1949; Worcester, Massachusetts, U.S.
- Died: February 19, 2024 (aged 74); East Brookfield, Massachusetts, U.S.
- Education: Emerson College
- Occupation: Actor
- Years active: 1973–2009

Paul D'Amato (October 2, 1949 – February 19, 2024) was an American actor best known for his appearance as the lead antagonist in the hockey film Slap Shot. Apart from films, he also acted in various television series and stage productions, often cast as a thug or henchman.

== Early life, education, and career ==
Paul D'Amato was born in Worcester, Massachusetts, on October 2, 1949. D'Amato began working as a stagehand at the age of 14. When he was 21, he changed his career path to acting. He attended Emerson College, where he appeared in school productions and also played on the school ice hockey team. In 1974, he moved to Montpelier, Vermont, and acted in a local theatre ensemble. He played one of the three prisoners in a 1975 stage production of the Jean Genet play, Deathwatch, for which his performance was reviewed as "outstanding".

== Film and stage career ==
D'Amato's combination of acting and ice hockey experience put him in contention for a role in the 1977 film Slap Shot, in which he played the main antagonist, Tim "Dr. Hook" McCracken. He appeared in films including The Deadliest Season (1977 TV film), The Deer Hunter (1978), Firepower (1979), and Heaven's Gate. His appearance in Slap Shot served as the basis of Marvel Comics artist John Byrne's rendition of the X-Men comic book character, Wolverine. D'Amato also had a stage career, appearing in a Vermont production of Shakespeare's Pericles, Prince of Tyre in 1980. In the 1980s, D'Amato was typically cast as a thug or henchman; in a 1983 pilot for the TV series Murder Ink, his character assaulted a character played by Ellen Barkin, and in the 1987 film Suspect, he "held a razor to Cher's throat... and stabbed [Dennis Quaid]". Later in life, D'Amato joked about the occasions in which his characters menaced characters played by famous actors. In the 1990s and 2000s D'Amato appeared as different characters in multiple episodes of Law & Order and Law & Order: Criminal Intent. In 1996, he performed in an off-Broadway revival of the play, Requiem for a Heavyweight.

== Later life ==
D'Amato continued to make public appearances in the 2010s, mostly evoking his appearance in Slap Shot. In November 2010, D'Amato dropped the ceremonial first puck at a hockey game between the Danbury Whalers and the Broome County Barons. In July 2012, he came out for an ice skating event to raise funds for Hope Lodge in Worcester. In August 2017, he participated in a reunion of members of the Slap Shot cast in Winnipeg for a golf tournament commemorating the 40th anniversary of the film. By 2019, he was working as a boot-fitter in a Vermont ski shop, which facilitated his skiing hobby.

== Personal life and death ==
In the mid-1970s, D'Amato married Bertine Colombo of Montpelier, whom he met while they attended adjacent colleges. In 2019, he was engaged to Marina Re, with whom he remained at the time of his death.

D'Amato died in East Brookfield, Massachusetts, on February 19, 2024, at the age of 74. He had a four-year battle with progressive supranuclear palsy, a rare brain disease. (Note: Many news sources mislabel his age as "75" or "76".)

== Filmography ==
| Year | Title | Role | Notes |
|---|---|---|---|
| 1973 | Magnum Force | Store Crook #2 | Uncredited |
| 1977 | Slap Shot | Tim "Dr. Hook" McCracken | |
| 1977 | The Deadliest Season | Dave Eskanazi | TV movie |
| 1978 | Heaven Can Wait | Swimmer's Friend | Uncredited |
| 1978 | The Deer Hunter | Green Beret | |
| 1979 | Firepower | Tagua | |
| 1980 | Heaven's Gate | Bearded Mercenary | |
| 1986 | F/X | Gallagher | |
| 1987 | Suspect | Michael | |
| 1993 | Dangerous Affairs | Harold Anderson | |
| 1994 | Crimson Lights | | |
| 1997 | Six Ways to Sunday | Fishetti | |
| 1998 | Men Under Water | Man at Counter | |
| 1999 | The Opportunists | Dylan | |
| 2007 | The Living Wake | Rutger | |
| 2007 | Light and the Sufferer | Jimmy | |
