= Mary Joy =

Disambiguation name page

Mary Joy is a feminine given name.

Notable people with this name include:

- Mary Joy Dela Cruz Baron, birth name of Majoy Baron (born 1995), Filipino volleyball player
- Mary Joy Langdon (born 1951), English Roman Catholic nun and firefighter
- Mary Joy Tabal (born 1989), Filipino marathon runner
