= Peter Kass =

American theater actor and director

Peter Meyer Kass (April 28, 1923 – August 4, 2008) was an American theater actor and director who became a well-known teacher. His mentor Clifford Odets chose Kass to direct and develop The Country Girl before it opened on Broadway. Kass played the part of Larry.

Kass was the son of Russian immigrants. During World War II he served in the Army in Europe.

Kass later directed four Broadway plays, including a short-lived revival of Odets' Night Music and Lorraine Hansberry's The Sign in Sidney Brustein's Window. He also directed Assignment Manhunt for television and worked on the Red Buttons show; he directed the 1961 feature film Time of the Heathen.

Kass taught at Boston University in the 1950s, then at New York University in the 1960s and 1970s before becoming a private instructor. Students included Olympia Dukakis, Faye Dunaway, John Cazale, Maureen Stapleton and Val Kilmer.

Kass was born in Brooklyn and was a lifelong resident. He died of heart failure in Manhattan.

Kass was married to the former Nance Robbins for 50 years, and they had two sons.

== Preservation ==
Time of the Heathen was preserved and restored by the UCLA Film & Television Archive and Lightbox Film Center, University of the Arts from the 35mm original picture and track negatives, and the original ¼ in. stereo master recording of Lejaren Hiller’s score. Restoration funding was provided by Ron and Suzanne Naples. The restoration had its Los Angeles premiere at the 2024 UCLA Festival of Preservation.
