= Everybody's Favorite Bagman =

1990 episode of Law & Order

- Law & Order episode
- Episode no.: Season 1 Episode 6
- Directed by: John Patterson
- Written by: Dick Wolf
- Original air date: October 30, 1990

Guest appearances
- Roy Thinnes as D.A. Alfred Wentworth; Paul Guilfoyle as Anthony Scalisi; William H. Macy as Assistant U.S. Attorney John McCormack; Ron Foster as William Jefferson

Episode chronology
← Previous "Happily Ever After"	Next → "By Hooker, By Crook"

"Everybody's Favorite Bagman" is the sixth episode of the first season of the American police procedural and legal drama Law & Order. The episode was written by Dick Wolf and directed by John Patterson, and originally aired on NBC on October 30, 1990. The episode was produced in 1988 and was the pilot episode of the series, although it is not the first broadcast.

== Plot ==
After local councilman and former bagman Charles Halsey is mugged and his throat slashed, Logan and Greevey investigate the case and the two young black male suspects initially caught. Their suspicion turns to organized crime when they link the victim to Masucci family soldier Tony Scalisi (Paul Guilfoyle).

As Stone and Robinette continue their investigation, they uncover a corruption scandal involving a councilman; the collection of parking meter violation fines has been awarded to a firm connected to organized crime. To avoid the appearance of impropriety, District Attorney Wentworth won't allow Stone to offer Scalisi immunity. However, in order to win their case, their only option might be to make a deal with the mobster.

Stone discovers that the case involves not only organized crime, but also elected city officials and a deputy police commissioner whom he accuses of changing his testimony and doctoring evidence in a past case. Stone is unable to use the police because of suspected corruption within the department, so he consults Assistant U.S. Attorney John McCormack (William H. Macy).

== Production ==
"Everybody's Favorite Bagman" was directed by John Patterson and written by Dick Wolf. It was produced in 1988 and was the pilot of the series. "Prescription for Death" aired as the series premiere instead, while "Everybody's Favorite Bagman" aired as the sixth episode in the series.

The pilot was shot on 16 mm film and then blown up to 35 mm to give it a gritty, documentary-style appearance. It was produced for CBS, but the network declined to pick up the series. NBC later ordered the series for its 1990 schedule.

Roy Thinnes was cast as District Attorney Alfred Wentworth, by the time production of Law & Order began in 1990, Thinnes was starring in Dark Shadows and declined to return.

Steven Hill was selected as his replacement, portraying District Attorney Adam Schiff.

Steven Zirnkilton, the narrator of the Law & Order franchise’s opening sequences, makes an onscreen appearance in the episode.

== Notes ==
=== Bibliography ===
- Courrier, Kevin; Green, Susan (1999). Law & Order: The Unofficial Companion (2nd ed.). Los Angeles, California: Renaissance Books. ISBN 1-58063-108-8.
