= Robert Palm =

American writer and producer

Robert Palm is an American writer and producer for television, best known as the first executive producer of the currently running NBC drama, Law & Order: Special Victims Unit and a consulting producer on the currently running CBS drama, NCIS.

His work with Law & Order was nominated for an Emmy Award in 1992.

He published his first novel in 2023, Erasure.
