= Richard Brooks (actor) =

American actor, singer, director (born 1962)

- Born: Richard Lee Brooks; December 9, 1962 (age 63); Cleveland, Ohio, U.S.
- Occupations: Actor; singer; director
- Years active: 1983–present

Richard Lee Brooks (born December 9, 1962) is an American actor, singer, and director. He played the eccentric bounty hunter Jubal Early in the space-western Firefly and assistant district attorney Paul Robinette in the NBC drama series Law & Order from 1990 to 1993, later appearing as a defense attorney on that same show. In 2013, he began starring as Patrick Patterson in the BET drama series, Being Mary Jane.

== Early life ==
Born and raised in Cleveland, Ohio he later moved to New York City and was a student of the Circle in the Square Professional Theater School.

== Career ==
While in New York, Brooks performed in the Eugene O'Neill Theater Conference production of August Wilson's Fences, which gained him a positive reputation. A subsequent move to Los Angeles found the actor landing television roles in Hill Street Blues and The Russians Are Coming, along with made-for-TV features such as Badge of the Assassin (1985) and Resting Place (1986). With Teen Wolf (1985), The Hidden (1987), Off Limits (1988), Shakedown (1988), and Shocker (1989), Brooks began his work in the world of feature films. Brooks appeared as OD in the award-winning film 84C MoPic (1989), directed by Patrick Sheane Duncan.

Throughout the 1990s, most of his popularity came from his widespread exposure in his role as Paul Robinette on Law & Order. His roles alternated between feature films, television, and the stage. After appearing in The Substitute and playing the villain in The Crow: City of Angels (both 1996), Brooks opted to try his hand at directing, and the result was Johnny B Good (1998). It is about a young, urban black man who makes a positive change after suffering amnesia. Brooks returned to television for the short-lived series G vs E in 1999. In 2001, he made a guest appearance in NYPD Blue. Brooks' performance on Joss Whedon's Firefly as bounty hunter Jubal Early in the existentialist series finale "Objects in Space" gained him many fans. He also appeared as Hasdrabul Skaras in "Slayer", the fifth episode of the series Brimstone and as Detective Ehrle in the short-lived Fox series Drive, alongside Nathan Fillion, with whom Brooks had worked on Firefly.

Brooks founded his own production company, Flat Top Entertainment LLC. At the dawn of the millennium, Brooks released his first solo R&B album, Smooth Love, on Flat Top Records.

In March 2011, Brooks played the role of Harmond Wilkes in Radio Golf, written by August Wilson, at Geva Theatre Center in Rochester, New York. He played Frederick Douglass in the 2013 PBS series The Abolitionists.

Brooks starred as Patrick in the BET original series Being Mary Jane. It premiered July 2, 2013. He starred as Lead Marshal Pollack in Person of Interest, season 3, "The Devil's Share". He played Warden Gregory Wolfe in season 4 of The Flash, and Dwight Wise in Seasons 5 and 6 of the show Bosch. Brooks played Augustus Barringer on the UMC network comedy The Rich and the Ruthless (2017–2021). He has a recurring role as LAFD Chief Simpson in 9-1-1.

== Filmography ==
=== Film ===
Year	Title	Role	Notes
1985	Teen Wolf	Lemonade	
1986	Good to Go	Chemist	
1987	The Hidden	Sanchez	
1988	Saxo	Joe	
1988	Off Limits	Preacher	
1988	Shakedown	Michael Jones	
1989	84C MoPic	OD	
1989	Shocker	Rhino	
1990	To Sleep with Anger	Babe Brother	
1995	Chameleon	Tom Wilson	
1996	Black Rose of Harlem	Yancey	
1996	The Substitute	Wellman	
1996	The Crow: City of Angels	Judah Earl	
1998	Johnny B Good	-	
1998	The Adventures of Ragtime	Agent Dooley	
1998	Acid Rain	-	
1999	In Too Deep	Wesley	
2004	Lexie	Ricardo French	Direct-to-video
2009	Dough Boys	Detective Nichols	
2010	Who Da Man?	Dante	Short film
2011	In My Pocket	Dr. Barry	
2013	Officer Down	McAlister's Lawyer	
2015	The Sin Seer	Jake Ballard	
2020	Noah's Arc: The 'Rona Chronicles	Wade's Dad	Short film
2020	Troubled Waters	Floyd Cash	
2020	Steele Justice	Alex	

=== Television ===
Year	Title	Role	Notes
1983	Hill Street Blues	Tyrone Crane	Episode: "The Russians Are Coming"
1984	With Intent to Kill	Eddie Cox	TV movie
1985	Badge of the Assassin	Anthony "Tony" Bottom	TV movie
1986	Resting Place	Booker T. Douglas	TV movie
1987	A Special Friendship	Matt Bowser	TV movie
1988	Spenser: For Hire	Robert	Episode: "The Siege"
1989	Terror on Highway 91	-	TV movie
1989	Tour of Duty	Private First Class Marsten	Episode: "True Grit"
1989	Almost Grown	Curtis	Episode: "Jersey Blues"
1989	The Neon Empire	Tampa	TV movie
1990–1993, 1996, 2005, 2006	Law & Order	Paul Robinette	Main Cast (seasons 1–3); 3 episodes (seasons 6, 16, 17)
1992	Memphis	Eben Kinship	TV movie
1994	ER	Mr. Freeman	Episode: "Chicago Heat"
1994	Chicago Hope	Henry Lavelle	Episode: "Shutt Down"
1994	Diagnosis: Murder	Mercury "The Heat" Jones	Episode: "Standing Eight Count"
1995	Renegade	Barry	Episode: "Repo Raines"
1996	Code Name: Wolverine	Special Agent John Baines	TV movie
1997	Nash Bridges	Max Moore	Episode: "Found Money"
1997	Renegade	Agent Marcus Donner	Episode: "Top Ten with a Bullet"
1998	The Wedding	Lincoln Odis	TV movie
1998	Brimstone	Hasdrabul Skaras	Episode: "Slayer"
1998	NYPD Blue	Everette McRae	Episode: "Hammer Time"
1999	WWE Raw	Henry McNeil	Episode: "Rebellion Results"
1999	Judging Amy	Mr. Plymouth	Episode: "Presumed Innocent"
1999–2000	G vs E	Henry McNeil	Main cast
2001	NYPD Blue	Captain Eric Knowlton	Episode: "Franco, My Dear, I Don't Give a Damn"
2001	Dead Last	Tyrell Nitro "TNT" Thompson	Episode: "The Problem with Corruption"
2002	Firefly	Jubal Early	Episode: "Objects in Space"
2003	Skin	-	Episode: "Pilot"
2003	NCIS	Lieutenant Colonel Walsh	Episode: "Marine Down"
2006	Close to Home	Phil Raab	Episode: "Community"
2006	Spy Games: The Black Wolf Hunt	-	TV movie
2007	Drive	Detective Ehrle	Recurring role
2009	Lie to Me	Mark Boulware	Episode: "Life is Priceless"
2011	Childrens Hospital	Robert	Episode: "Father's Day"
2011	Charlie's Angels	Richard Umbaque	Episode: "Royal Angels"
2013	American Experience	Frederick Douglass	Episode: "The Abolitionists: Part 1-3"
2013	Person of Interest	Lead Marshal Pollack	Episode: "The Devil's Share"
2013–2019	Being Mary Jane	Patrick Patterson	Main cast
2015	Elementary	Detective Demps	Episode: "For All You Know"
2016	Unsung Hollywood	Himself	Episode: "Sheryl Lee Ralph"
2016	The Good Wife	Ace Barnstone	Episode: "Targets"
2016	You Can't Hurry Love	Pastor Avery	TV movie
2017	Chicago Justice	Defense Attorney Paul Robinette	Episode: "Uncertainty Principle"
2017–2018	The Flash	Warden Gregory Wolfe	Recurring role (season 4)
2017–2021	The Rich and the Ruthless	Augustus Barringer	Main cast
2018–2019	Jacqueline and Jilly	Magnus Mitchell	Main cast
2019	The Blacklist	Mitchell Young	Episode: "Olivia Olson (No. 115)"
2019	All Rise	Assistant Chief Jack Healy	Episodes: "Pilot" & "A View from the Bus"
2019–2020	Bosch	Dwight Wise	Recurring role (seasons 5–6)
2019–2021, 2023	Good Trouble	Joseph	Recurring role (seasons 2–3), 1 episode (season 5)
2020	The Haves and the Have Nots	Al	Recurring role (season 7), 1 episode (season 8)
2021	Chicago P.D.	Lieutenant Mike Carey	Episode: "Tender Age"
2021	Shameless Hall of Shame	Big Liam	Episode: "Frank: Ghosts of Gallagher Past"
2022–present	Abbott Elementary	Gerald Howard	4 episodes
2024–present	9-1-1	Chief Cordell Simpson	Recurring role (seasons 7–10)
2025	Reasonable Doubt	Eddie Nicholas	Recurring role (season 3)

== Awards and nominations ==
Year	Award	Category	Work	Result
2018	Daytime Emmy Awards	Daytime Emmy Award for Outstanding Digital Daytime Drama Series	The Rich and the Ruthless	Nominated
