= List of Law & Order episodes =

Law & Order is an American police procedural and legal drama television series created by Dick Wolf that premiered on NBC on September 13, 1990. Set in New York City, where episodes were also filmed, the series ran for twenty seasons before it was cancelled on May 14, 2010, and aired its final episode ten days later, on May 24. After its cancellation, AMC Network considered reviving Law & Order for a twenty-first season; however, in July 2010, Dick Wolf indicated that attempts had failed and he declared that the series had now "moved to the history books".

The series was ultimately revived for a 21st season in February 2022. In May 2025, it was renewed for a twenty-fifth season. The twenty-sixth season premiered on October 8, 2026. As of November 12, 2026, 550 episodes of Law & Order have aired, currently in its twenty-sixth season.

== Series overview ==
Season	Episodes	Originally released		Rank	Avg. rating (Note: In households; seasons 1–7)/ Avg. viewers (Note: In millions; seasons 8–20)
Season	Episodes	First released	Last released	Rank	Avg. rating/ Avg. viewers
1	22	September 13, 1990	June 9, 1991	#46	12.1
2	22	September 17, 1991	May 12, 1992	#46	12.3
3	22	September 23, 1992	May 19, 1993	#56	10.2
4	22	September 15, 1993	May 25, 1994	#38	11.9
5	23	September 21, 1994	May 24, 1995	#27	11.6
6	23	September 20, 1995	May 22, 1996	#24	10.9
7	23	September 18, 1996	May 21, 1997	#27	10.5
8	24	September 24, 1997	May 20, 1998	#24	14.1
9	24	September 23, 1998	May 26, 1999	#20	13.8
Film	1	November 8, 1998		—N/a	17.9
10	24	September 22, 1999	May 24, 2000	#13	16.3
11	24	October 18, 2000	May 23, 2001	#11	17.7
12	24	September 26, 2001	May 22, 2002	#7	18.7
13	24	October 2, 2002	May 21, 2003	#10	17.3
14	24	September 24, 2003	May 19, 2004	#14	15.9
15	24	September 22, 2004	May 18, 2005	#25	13.0
16	22	September 21, 2005	May 17, 2006	#35	11.2
17	22	September 22, 2006	May 18, 2007	#54	9.4
18	18	January 2, 2008	May 21, 2008	#38	9.7
19	22	November 5, 2008	June 3, 2009	#62	8.2
20	23	September 25, 2009	May 24, 2010	#60	7.2
21	10	February 24, 2022	May 19, 2022	#39	5.9
22	22	September 22, 2022	May 18, 2023	#34	5.9
23	13	January 18, 2024	May 16, 2024	TBA	TBA
24	22	October 3, 2024	May 15, 2025	TBA	TBA
25	21	September 25, 2025	May 14, 2026	TBA	TBA
26	TBA	October 8, 2026	TBA	TBA	TBA

== Episodes ==
=== Season 1 (1990–1991) ===
- The sixth episode "Everybody's Favorite Bagman" was the original pilot made by CBS in 1988. NBC decided to air "Prescription for Death" as the first episode of the series in 1990, before airing the original pilot later in the season.
- It marks the only release of George Dzundza who left the cast at the end of the first season. He was replaced by Paul Sorvino.
- S. Epatha Merkerson guest-stars as Denise Winters in the episode "Mushrooms". She then joins the main cast as Lieutenant Anita Van Buren three seasons later. James McDaniel, who plays Michael Ingrams, became Lieutenant Arthur Fancy on NYPD Blue.
- Thirteen episodes (excluding the CBS pilot) were filmed between the spring and summer of 1990 before being broadcast. Thirteen episodes were already completed before the show premiered on NBC.
- This is the first season to feature 22 episodes.

No. overall	No. in season	Title	Directed by	Written by	Original release date	Prod. code	U.S. viewers (millions)
1	1	"Prescription for Death"	John P. Whitesell II	S : David Black; S/T : Ed Zuckerman	September 13, 1990	66209	14.0
2	2	"Subterranean Homeboy Blues"	E. W. Swackhamer	Robert Palm	September 20, 1990	66205	15.5
3	3	"The Reaper's Helper"	Vern Gillum	T : David Black & Robert Stuart Nathan; S/T : Thomas Francis McElroy	October 4, 1990	66215	14.6
4	4	"Kiss the Girls and Make Them Die"	Charles Correll	S : Dick Wolf; T : Robert Stuart Nathan	October 11, 1990	66210	16.8
5	5	"Happily Ever After"	Vern Gillum	S : Dick Wolf; T : Robert Stuart Nathan; S/T : David Black	October 23, 1990	66216	19.4
6	6	"Everybody's Favorite Bagman"	John Patterson	Dick Wolf	October 30, 1990	83543	18.2
7	7	"By Hooker, By Crook"	Martin Davidson	David Black	November 13, 1990	66203	17.7
8	8	"Poison Ivy"	E. W. Swackhamer	S : Jack Richardson; S/T : Jacob Brackman	November 20, 1990	66211	15.0
9	9	"Indifference"	James Quinn	Robert Palm	November 27, 1990	66207	17.6
10	10	"Prisoner of Love"	Michael Fresco	S : David Black; S/T : Robert Stuart Nathan	December 4, 1990	66208	16.8
11	11	"Out of the Half-Light"	E. W. Swackhamer	Michael Duggan	December 11, 1990	66202	19.8
12	12	"Life Choice"	Aaron Lipstadt	S : Dick Wolf; T : David Black & Robert Stuart Nathan	January 8, 1991	66213	19.2
13	13	"A Death in the Family"	Gwen Arner	T : David Black; S/T : Joe Viola	January 15, 1991	66204	17.8
14	14	"The Violence of Summer"	Don Scardino	Michael Duggan	February 5, 1991	66219	16.2
15	15	"The Torrents of Greed"	E. W. Swackhamer	S : Michael Duggan; S/T : Michael S. Chernuchin	February 12, 1991	66222	16.6
16	16	"The Torrents of Greed"	E. W. Swackhamer	S : Michael Duggan; S/T : Michael S. Chernuchin	February 19, 1991	66225	13.6
17	17	"Mushrooms"	Daniel Sackheim	Robert Palm	February 26, 1991	66218	15.6
18	18	"The Secret Sharers"	E. W. Swackhamer	Robert Stuart Nathan	March 12, 1991	66221	13.2
19	19	"The Serpent's Tooth"	Don Scardino	S : I.C. Rapoport & Joshua Stern; T : René Balcer & Robert Stuart Nathan	March 19, 1991	66224	19.3
20	20	"The Troubles"	John P. Whitesell II	S : Dick Wolf; S/T : Robert Palm	March 26, 1991	66214	17.4
21	21	"Sonata for Solo Organ"	Fred Gerber	S : Michael Duggan; T : Michael S. Chernuchin; S/T : Joe Morgenstern	April 2, 1991	66226	18.0
22	22	"The Blue Wall"	Vern Gillum	S : Dick Wolf; S/T : Robert Stuart Nathan	June 9, 1991	66220	12.2

=== Season 2 (1991–1992) ===
- Paul Sorvino joined the cast as Phil Cerreta.
- Carolyn McCormick joined the cast as Dr. Elizabeth Olivet In the episode "Confession"
- The episode "The Wages of Love" guest-stars Jerry Orbach as a defense attorney. He became Mike Logan's new partner the next season as wisecracking detective Lennie Briscoe.

No. overall	No. in season	Title	Directed by	Written by	Original release date	Prod. code	U.S. viewers (millions)
23	1	"Confession"	Fred Gerber	Michael Duggan & Robert Palm	September 17, 1991	67416	16.4
24	2	"The Wages of Love"	Ed Sherin	S : Robert Stuart Nathan; S/T : Ed Zuckerman	September 24, 1991	67405	16.6
25	3	"Aria"	Don Scardino	S : Michael S. Chernuchin; T : Christine Roum	October 1, 1991	67411	18.9
26	4	"Asylum"	Kristoffer Siegel-Tabori	S : Robert Palm; T : Kathy McCormick	October 8, 1991	67409	20.8
27	5	"God Bless the Child"	E.W. Swackhamer	David Black & Robert Stuart Nathan	October 22, 1991	67404	15.1
28	6	"Misconception"	Daniel Sackheim	S : Michael Duggan; S/T : Michael S. Chernuchin	October 29, 1991	67410	18.5
29	7	"In Memory Of"	Ed Sherin	S : Siobhan Byrne; T : Robert Stuart Nathan; S/T : David Black	November 5, 1991	67413	18.1
30	8	"Out of Control"	John Whitesell	S : David Black & Robert Stuart Nathan; T : Jack Richardson	November 12, 1991	67403	19.3
31	9	"Renunciation"	Gwen Arner	Michael S. Chernuchin & Joe Morgenstern	November 19, 1991	67414	16.0
32	10	"Heaven"	Ed Sherin	T : Nancy Ann Miller; S/T : Robert Palm	November 26, 1991	67415	19.1
33	11	"His Hour Upon the Stage"	Steve Cohen	Robert Nathan & Giles Blunt	December 10, 1991	67407	18.3
34	12	"Star Struck"	Ed Sherin	S : David Black & Alan Gelb; T : Robert Nathan & Sally Nemeth	January 7, 1992	67406	21.3
35	13	"Severance"	Jim Frawley	S : Michael Duggan; T : Michael S. Chernuchin; S/T : William N. Fordes	January 14, 1992	67418	17.4
36	14	"Blood Is Thicker"	Peter Levin	S : Robert Nathan; S/T : Ed Zuckerman	February 4, 1992	67422	17.6
37	15	"Trust"	Daniel Sackheim	S : Michael Duggan; S/T : René Balcer	February 11, 1992	67417	17.6
38	16	"Vengeance"	Daniel Sackheim	S : Peter S. Greenberg; T : René Balcer; S/T : Michael S. Chernuchin	February 18, 1992	67420	19.2
39	17	"Sisters of Mercy"	Fred Gerber	S : Robert Palm; S/T : René Balcer	March 3, 1992	67423	16.4
40	18	"Cradle to Grave"	James Frawley	Robert Nathan & Sally Nemeth	March 31, 1992	67424	18.1
41	19	"The Fertile Fields"	Ed Sherin	Michael S. Chernuchin & René Balcer	April 7, 1992	67425	17.5
42	20	"Intolerance"	Steven Robman	Robert Nathan & Sally Nemeth	April 14, 1992	67426	14.9
43	21	"Silence"	Ed Sherin	S : Michael Duggan; T : Michael S. Chernuchin; S/T : René Balcer	April 28, 1992	67427	11.1
44	22	"The Working Stiff"	Daniel Sackheim	S : William N. Fordes; S/T : Robert Palm	May 12, 1992	67428	12.1

=== Season 3 (1992–1993) ===
- Paul Sorvino (Phil Cerreta) left the cast after the episode "Point of View". He was replaced by Jerry Orbach (Lennie Briscoe) who came in during that episode.
- Dann Florek (Don Cragen) and Richard Brooks (Paul Robinette) left the cast after the season finale. Florek was replaced by S. Epatha Merkerson (Anita Van Buren), and Brooks was replaced by Jill Hennessy (Claire Kincaid) in season 4.

No. overall	No. in season	Title	Directed by	Written by	Original release date	Prod. code	U.S. viewers (millions)
45	1	"Skin Deep"	Daniel Sackheim	Robert Nathan & Gordon Rayfield	September 23, 1992	68009	14.9
46	2	"Conspiracy"	Ed Sherin	Michael S. Chernuchin & René Balcer	September 30, 1992	68006	12.8
47	3	"Forgiveness"	Bill D'Elia	S : Robert Nathan; S/T : Ed Zuckerman	October 7, 1992	68005	17.2
48	4	"The Corporate Veil"	Don Scardino	Michael S. Chernuchin & Joe Morgenstern	October 14, 1992	68007	14.8
49	5	"Wedded Bliss"	Vern Gillum	Robert Nathan & Edward Pomerantz	October 21, 1992	68004	14.8
50	6	"Helpless"	James Frawley	Michael S. Chernuchin & Christine Roum	November 4, 1992	68011	17.5
51	7	"Self-Defense"	Ed Sherin	René Balcer & Hall Powell	November 11, 1992	68008	14.9
52	8	"Prince of Darkness"	Gilbert Shilton	Robert Nathan & William N. Fordes	November 18, 1992	68003	14.6
53	9	"Point of View"	Gilbert Moses	Walon Green & René Balcer	November 25, 1992	68012	16.4
54	10	"Consultation"	James Hayman	Matt Kiene & Joseph Reinkemeyer	December 9, 1992	68014	13.4
55	11	"Extended Family"	Charles Correll	T : Robert Nathan; S/T : Wendell Rawls	January 6, 1993	68015	16.1
56	12	"Right to Counsel"	James Frawley	Michael S. Chernuchin & Barry M. Schkolnick	January 13, 1993	68019	15.1
57	13	"Night and Fog"	Ed Sherin	Michael S. Chernuchin & René Balcer	February 3, 1993	68018	14.6
58	14	"Promises to Keep"	Ed Sherin	S : William N. Fordes & Douglas Stark; T : Robert Nathan & Joshua Stern	February 10, 1993	68022	11.4
59	15	"Mother Love"	Daniel Sackheim	S : Walon Green; S/T : Robert Nathan	February 24, 1993	68024	14.6
60	16	"Jurisdiction"	Bruce Seth Green	Walon Green & René Balcer	March 3, 1993	68017	N/A
61	17	"Conduct Unbecoming"	Arthur W. Forney	S : Walon Green & Peter S. Greenberg; T : Michael S. Chernuchin & René Balcer	March 10, 1993	68023	13.5
62	18	"Animal Instinct"	Ed Sherin	Michael S. Chernuchin & Sibyl Gardner	March 17, 1993	68021	12.7
63	19	"Virus (Note: Listed as "Computer Virus" on some home media releases and streaming services.)"	Steven Robman	Michael S. Chernuchin & René Balcer	April 21, 1993	68010	11.9
64	20	"Securitate"	James Hayman	Matt Kiene & Joe Reinkemeyer	May 5, 1993	68026	10.8
65	21	"Manhood"	Ed Sherin	S : Walon Green; S/T : Robert Nathan	May 12, 1993	68025	13.7
66	22	"Benevolence"	Ed Sherin	T : René Balcer; S/T : Douglas Palau	May 19, 1993	68028	15.4

=== Season 4 (1993–1994) ===
- S. Epatha Merkerson (Anita Van Buren) and Jill Hennessy (Claire Kincaid) joined the cast.
- Carolyn McCormick (Elizabeth Olivet) and Michael Moriarty (Benjamin Stone) left the cast at the end of the season. Moriarty was replaced by Sam Waterston (Jack McCoy) in season 5. McCormick would reprise her role in a recurring or guest capacity in thirteen of the remaining sixteen seasons over the series' original run until 2009.
- This season the opening sequence changed to a shorter version with more bass which applies to the rest of the season.
- Beginning with this season, Florek directed several episodes before joining the cast of its 1999 spin-off, Law & Order: Special Victims Unit.

No. overall	No. in season	Title	Directed by	Written by	Original release date	Prod. code	U.S. viewers (millions)
67	1	"Sweeps"	James Frawley	Craig McNeer & Robert Nathan	September 15, 1993	69009	13.6
68	2	"Volunteers"	James Quinn	René Balcer	September 29, 1993	69017	13.7
69	3	"Discord"	Ed Sherin	Michael S. Chernuchin	October 6, 1993	69012	15.3
70	4	"Profile"	E.W. Swackhamer	T : Ed Zuckerman; S/T : Gordon Rayfield	October 13, 1993	69010	16.0
71	5	"Black Tie"	Arthur W. Forney	Walon Green & Michael S. Chernuchin	October 20, 1993	69004	16.3
72	6	"Pride and Joy"	Gilbert Shilton	Edward Pomerantz & Robert Nathan	October 27, 1993	69006	16.2
73	7	"Apocrypha"	Gabrielle Beaumont	Michael S. Chernuchin	November 3, 1993	69013	14.9
74	8	"American Dream"	Constantine Makris	Sibyl Gardner	November 9, 1993	69018	14.4
75	9	"Born Bad"	Fred Gerber	Michael S. Chernuchin & Sally Nemeth	November 16, 1993	69021	15.6
76	10	"The Pursuit of Happiness"	Dann Florek	Morgan Gendel & Robert Nathan	December 1, 1993	69005	17.0
77	11	"Golden Years"	Helaine Head	T : Ed Zuckerman; S/T : Doug Palau	January 5, 1994	69008	15.2
78	12	"Snatched"	Constantine Makris	Walon Green & René Balcer	January 12, 1994	69024	15.3
79	13	"Breeder"	Arthur W. Forney	Michael S. Chernuchin & René Balcer	January 19, 1994	69023	19.3
80	14	"Censure"	Ed Sherin	William N. Fordes	February 2, 1994	69026	19.0
81	15	"Kids"	Don Scardino	Michael Harbert & Robert Nathan	February 9, 1994	69028	16.3
82	16	"Big Bang"	Dann Florek	Ed Zuckerman	March 2, 1994	69027	15.7
83	17	"Mayhem"	James Quinn	S : Walon Green; T : René Balcer; S/T : Michael S. Chernuchin	March 9, 1994	69029	16.6
84	18	"Wager"	Ed Sherin	S : Michael S. Chernuchin; T : Kevin Arkadie; S/T : Harvey Solomon	March 30, 1994	69002	16.3
85	19	"Sanctuary"	Arthur W. Forney	Michael S. Chernuchin & William N. Fordes	April 13, 1994	69030	17.1
86	20	"Nurture"	Jace Alexander	Paris Qualles & Ed Zuckerman	May 4, 1994	69011	15.3
87	21	"Doubles"	Ed Sherin	Michael S. Chernuchin & René Balcer	May 18, 1994	69001	15.7
88	22	"Old Friends"	James Quinn	S : Robert Nathan; S/T : Joshua Stern	May 25, 1994	69031	15.3

=== Season 5 (1994–1995) ===
- Sam Waterston (Jack McCoy) joined the cast. Dann Florek reprises his role as Donald Cragen in the episode "Bad Faith".
- This is the first season to feature 23 episodes.
- The series' milestone 100th episode has aired in the middle of the 5th season.
- This was Chris Noth’s final season as a member of the regular cast, as Mike Logan; later, he reprised this role in the TV movie Exiled: A Law & Order Movie (1998), and on the series' second spin-off, Law & Order: Criminal Intent, from 2005 to 2008. Noth was replaced in season 6 by Benjamin Bratt as Junior Detective Rey Curtis.

No. overall	No. in season	Title	Directed by	Written by	Original release date	Prod. code	U.S. viewers (millions)
89	1	"Second Opinion"	Ed Sherin	Michael S. Chernuchin & Jeremy R. Littman	September 21, 1994	69408	18.3
90	2	"Coma"	Jace Alexander	Ed Zuckerman	September 28, 1994	69406	19.5
91	3	"Blue Bamboo"	Don Scardino	S : Hall Powell; T : Morgan Gendel; S/T : René Balcer	October 5, 1994	69402	15.5
92	4	"Family Values"	Constantine Makris	René Balcer & William N. Fordes	October 12, 1994	69401	17.7
93	5	"White Rabbit"	Steven Robman	Ed Zuckerman & Morgan Gendel	October 19, 1994	69411	18.2
94	6	"Competence"	Fred Gerber	Michael S. Chernuchin & Mark B. Perry	November 2, 1994	69409	17.9
95	7	"Precious"	Constantine Makris	René Balcer & I.C. Rapoport	November 9, 1994	69410	17.5
96	8	"Virtue"	Martha Mitchell	Mark B. Perry & Jeremy R. Littman	November 23, 1994	69412	18.7
97	9	"Scoundrels"	Marc Laub	Ed Zuckerman & Charles C. Mann	November 30, 1994	69415	18.3
98	10	"House Counsel"	James Quinn	Michael S. Chernuchin & Barry M. Schkolnick	January 4, 1995	69413	16.4
99	11	"Guardian"	Christopher Misiano	S : Brad Markowitz; T : William N. Fordes; S/T : René Balcer	January 11, 1995	69404	16.6
100	12	"Progeny"	Don Scardino	S : Mark B. Perry; T : Ed Zuckerman; S/T : Morgan Gendel	January 25, 1995	69416	16.4
101	13	"Rage"	Arthur W. Forney	Michael S. Chernuchin	February 1, 1995	69414	17.1
102	14	"Performance"	Martha Mitchell	S : René Balcer; T : Ed Zuckerman; S/T : Jeremy R. Littman	February 8, 1995	69419	16.2
103	15	"Seed"	Don Scardino	Michael S. Chernuchin & Janis Diamond	February 15, 1995	69420	16.8
104	16	"Wannabe"	Lewis H. Gould	René Balcer & I.C. Rapoport	March 15, 1995	69417	16.0
105	17	"Act of God"	Constantine Makris	Ed Zuckerman & Walter Dallenbach	March 22, 1995	69422	16.0
106	18	"Privileged"	Vincent Misiano	Jeremy R. Littman & Suzanne O'Malley	April 5, 1995	69418	14.6
107	19	"Cruel and Unusual"	Matthew Penn	René Balcer & Michael S. Chernuchin	April 19, 1995	69423	15.5
108	20	"Bad Faith"	Dann Florek	René Balcer	April 26, 1995	69426	13.4
109	21	"Purple Heart"	Arthur W. Forney	Morgan Gendel & William N. Fordes	May 3, 1995	69421	14.1
110	22	"Switch"	Christopher Misiano	Jeremy R. Littman & Sibyl Gardner	May 17, 1995	69425	14.1
111	23	"Pride"	Ed Sherin	Ed Zuckerman & Gene Ritchings	May 24, 1995	69427	13.4

=== Season 6 (1995–1996) ===
- Benjamin Bratt (Rey Curtis) joined the cast; Richard Brooks reprises his role as former ADA Paul Robinette; and Jill Hennessy (Claire Kincaid) left the cast at the end of the season.
- The season finale episode "Aftershock" was the first and only episode of the entire Law & Order series not to feature a case and instead focus on the characters' private lives.

No. overall	No. in season	Title	Directed by	Written by	Original release date	Prod. code	U.S. viewers (millions)
112	1	"Bitter Fruit"	Constantine Makris	René Balcer & Jeremy R. Littman	September 20, 1995	K0105	17.3
113	2	"Rebels"	Ed Sherin	T : Ed Zuckerman; S/T : Suzanne O'Malley	September 27, 1995	K0106	13.7
114	3	"Savages"	Jace Alexander	Morgan Gendal & Barry M. Schkolmick & Michael S. Chernuchin	October 18, 1995	K0103	14.7
115	4	"Jeopardy"	Christopher Misiano	René Balcer & Jeremy R. Littman	November 1, 1995	K0107	15.0
116	5	"Hot Pursuit"	Lewis H. Gould	Ed Zuckerman & Morgan Gendel	November 8, 1995	K0110	17.1
117	6	"Paranoia"	Fred Gerber	Michael S. Chernuchin	November 15, 1995	K0104	16.7
118	7	"Humiliation"	Matthew Penn	Michael S. Chernuchin & Barry M. Schkolnick	November 22, 1995	K0111	19.2
119	8	"Angel"	Arthur W. Forney	Michael S. Chernuchin & Janis Diamond	November 29, 1995	K0114	17.0
120	9	"Blood Libel"	Constantine Makris	S : René Balcer; S/T : I.C. Rapoport	January 3, 1996	K0109	18.7
121	10	"Remand"	Jace Alexander	René Balcer & Elaine Loeser	January 10, 1996	K0113	15.6
122	11	"Corpus Delicti"	Christopher Misiano	Ed Zuckerman & Barry M. Schkolnick	January 17, 1996	K0115	17.4
123	12	"Trophy"	Martha Mitchell	S : Ed Zuckerman; S/T : Jeremy R. Littman	January 31, 1996	K0112	17.3
124	13	"Charm City"	Ed Sherin	Michael S. Chernuchin & Jorge Zamacona	February 7, 1996	K0116	19.4
125	14	"Custody"	Constantine Makris	S : René Balcer; S/T : Morgan Gendel	February 21, 1996	K0117	14.7
126	15	"Encore"	Matthew Penn	Ed Zuckerman & Jeremy R. Littman	February 28, 1996	K0120	15.1
127	16	"Savior"	David Platt	Michael S. Chernuchin & Barry M. Schkolnick	March 13, 1996	K0121	15.9
128	17	"Deceit"	Vincent Misiano	René Balcer & Eddie Feldmann	March 27, 1996	K0118	15.3
129	18	"Atonement"	Martha Mitchell	S : Ed Zuckerman; S/T : Morgan Gendel	April 10, 1996	K0123	16.2
130	19	"Slave"	Jace Alexander	René Balcer & Elaine Loeser	April 21, 1996	K0122	12.7
131	20	"Girlfriends"	Christopher Misiano	S : Jeremy R. Littman; T : Suzanne O'Malley; S/T : Ed Zuckerman	May 1, 1996	K0124	13.6
132	21	"Pro Se"	Lewis H. Gould	René Balcer & I.C. Rapoport	May 8, 1996	K0119	14.6
133	22	"Homesick"	Matthew Penn	S : Michael S. Chernuchin; T : Elaine Loeser; S/T : Barry M. Schkolnick	May 15, 1996	K0126	17.3
134	23	"Aftershock"	Martha Mitchell	S : Michael S. Chernuchin; S/T : Janis Diamond	May 22, 1996	K0125	15.0

=== Season 7 (1996–1997) ===
- Carey Lowell joined the cast as Jamie Ross, replacing Jill Hennessy (Claire Kincaid) from the previous season.
- The three-part episode "D-Girl", "Turnaround," and "Showtime" guest-starred Scott Cohen, who went on to become DA Investigator Det. Chris Ravell in the spinoff Trial by Jury.

No. overall	No. in season	Title	Directed by	Written by	Original release date	Prod. code	U.S. viewers (millions)
135	1	"Causa Mortis"	Ed Sherin	René Balcer	September 18, 1996	K1106	15.7
136	2	"I.D."	Constantine Makris	Ed Zuckerman	September 25, 1996	K1107	16.5
137	3	"Good Girl"	Jace Alexander	Jeremy R. Littman	October 2, 1996	K1103	14.5
138	4	"Survivor"	Vincent Misiano	Barry M. Schkolnick	October 23, 1996	K1104	15.5
139	5	"Corruption"	Matthew Penn	S : René Balcer; S/T : Gardner Stern	October 30, 1996	K1101	16.2
140	6	"Double Blind"	Christopher Misiano	Jeremy R. Littman & William N. Fordes	November 6, 1996	K1105	15.22
141	7	"Deadbeat"	Constantine Makris	Ed Zuckerman & I.C. Rapoport	November 13, 1996	K1108	14.9
142	8	"Family Business"	Lewis H. Gould	Gardner Stern & Barry M. Schkolnick	November 20, 1996	K1111	14.0
143	9	"Entrapment"	Matthew Penn	René Balcer & Richard Sweren	January 8, 1997	K1109	13.23
144	10	"Legacy"	Brian Mertes	Ed Zuckerman & Jeremy R. Littman	January 15, 1997	K1113	15.06
145	11	"Menace"	Constantine Makris	S : Barry M. Schkolnick; S/T : I.C. Rapoport	February 5, 1997	K1114	14.97
146	12	"Barter"	Dan Karlok	René Balcer & Eddie Feldmann	February 12, 1997	K1110	14.80
147	13	"Matrimony"	Lewis H. Gould	Ed Zuckerman & Richard Sweren	February 19, 1997	K1115	13.14
148	14	"Working Mom"	Jace Alexander	Jeremy R. Littman & I.C. Rapoport	February 26, 1997	K1118	15.02
149	15	"D-Girl"	Ed Sherin	René Balcer & Ed Zuckerman & Gardner Stern	March 13, 1997	K1119	19.76
150	16	"Turnaround"	Ed Sherin	René Balcer & Ed Zuckerman & Gardner Stern	March 20, 1997	K1120	18.08
151	17	"Showtime"	Ed Sherin	René Balcer & Ed Zuckerman & Gardner Stern	March 27, 1997	K1121	17.07
152	18	"Mad Dog"	Christopher Misiano	René Balcer	April 2, 1997	K1116	14.88
153	19	"Double Down"	Arthur W. Forney	S : Richard Sweren; T : Ed Zuckerman; S/T : Shimon Wincelberg	April 16, 1997	K1122	14.62
154	20	"We Like Mike"	David Platt	Gardner Stern & I.C. Rapoport	April 30, 1997	K1125	13.37
155	21	"Passion"	Constantine Makris	S : Richard Sweren; S/T : Barry M. Schkolnick	May 7, 1997	K1124	13.06
156	22	"Past Imperfect"	Christopher Misiano	Janis Diamond	May 14, 1997	K1112	13.42
157	23	"Terminal"	Constantine Makris	René Balcer & Ed Zuckerman	May 21, 1997	K1102	14.88

=== Season 8 (1997–1998) ===
- This was the first of five different seasons in the series that had an unchanged cast from the previous season.
- This is the first season to feature 24 episodes.
- This is the final season to feature Carey Lowell in the main cast as Jamie Ross. She made a guest appearance in an episode in the next two seasons, as well as becoming a judge on the series' third spin-off, Law & Order: Trial by Jury. She appeared in the show's revival 21st season premiere episode in 2022.

No. overall	No. in season	Title	Directed by	Written by	Original release date	Prod. code	U.S. viewers (millions)
158	1	"Thrill"	Martha Mitchell	René Balcer	September 24, 1997	K2508	17.58
159	2	"Denial"	Christopher Misiano	S : René Balcer; S/T : David Shore	October 8, 1997	K2504	14.28
160	3	"Navy Blues"	Jace Alexander	S : Dick Wolf; S/T : Kathy McCormick	October 15, 1997	K2510	11.79
161	4	"Harvest"	Matthew Penn	S : René Balcer; S/T : I.C. Rapoport	October 29, 1997	K2506	14.18
162	5	"Nullification"	Constantine Makris	David Black	November 5, 1997	K2507	12.98
163	6	"Baby, It's You"	Ed Sherin	Jorge Zamacona	November 12, 1997	K2511	16.01
164	7	"Blood"	Jace Alexander	S : René Balcer; S/T : Craig Tepper	November 19, 1997	K2502	15.13
165	8	"Shadow"	Matthew Penn	Richard Sweren	November 26, 1997	K2505	14.81
166	9	"Burned"	Constantine Makris	Siobhan Byrne	December 10, 1997	K2501	14.24
167	10	"Ritual"	Brian Mertes	Kathy McCormick & Richard Sweren	December 17, 1997	K2516	13.88
168	11	"Under the Influence"	Adam Davidson	René Balcer	January 7, 1998	K2517	16.98
169	12	"Expert"	Lewis H. Gould	David Shore & I.C. Rapoport	January 21, 1998	K2518	13.55
170	13	"Castoff"	Gloria Muzio	David Black & Harold Schechter	January 28, 1998	K2512	15.59
171	14	"Grief"	Christopher Misiano	Suzanne Oshry	February 4, 1998	K2514	14.56
172	15	"Faccia a Faccia"	Martha Mitchell	René Balcer & Eddie Feldmann	February 25, 1998	K2519	13.78
173	16	"Divorce"	Constantine Makris	Barry M. Schkolnick	March 4, 1998	K2520	14.71
174	17	"Carrier"	J. Ranelli	David Black	April 1, 1998	K2525	12.73
175	18	"Stalker"	Richard Dobbs	Kathy McCormick	April 15, 1998	K2523	16.38
176	19	"Disappeared"	David Platt	Richard Sweren & William N. Fordes	April 22, 1998	K2528	14.20
177	20	"Burden"	Constantine Makris	David Shore & I.C. Rapoport	April 24, 1998	K2526	11.34
178	21	"Bad Girl"	Jace Alexander	René Balcer & Richard Sweren	April 29, 1998	K2524	14.26
179	22	"Damaged"	Constantine Makris	Janis Diamond	May 6, 1998	K2522	14.27
180	23	"Tabloid"	Brian Mertes	S : Alec Baldwin; S/T : David Black	May 13, 1998	K2515	13.28
181	24	"Monster"	Ed Sherin	René Balcer & Richard Sweren	May 20, 1998	K2527	14.80

=== Season 9 (1998–1999) ===
- Angie Harmon joins the cast as Abbie Carmichael in this season. Benjamin Bratt (Rey Curtis) leaves the cast after this season but returns in the twentieth-season episode "Fed".
- Exiled: A Law & Order Movie was broadcast during this season.

No. overall	No. in season	Title	Directed by	Written by	Original release date	Prod. code	U.S. viewers (millions)
182	1	"Cherished"	Ed Sherin	S : Carl Nelson & Scott Tobin; S/T : Kathy McCormick	September 23, 1998	E0203	15.56
183	2	"DWB"	Constantine Makris	René Balcer	October 7, 1998	E0205	13.01
184	3	"Bait"	Lewis H. Gould	S : I.C. Rapoport; S/T : David Shore	October 14, 1998	E0204	11.84
185	4	"Flight"	David Platt	Richard Sweren & William N. Fordes	October 21, 1998	E0209	12.22
186	5	"Agony"	Constantine Makris	Kathy McCormick	November 4, 1998	E0216	15.62
–	–	Exiled: A Law & Order Movie	Jean de Segonzac	S : Chris Noth; S/T : Charles Kipps	November 8, 1998	E0201	17.86
187	6	"Scrambled"	Martha Mitchell	S : Judith Hooper & Dick Teresi; T : Ed Zuckerman	November 11, 1998	E0208	13.78
188	7	"Venom"	Jace Alexander	S : David Shore; S/T : I.C. Rapoport	November 18, 1998	E0206	15.91
189	8	"Punk"	Matthew Penn	S : Richard Sweren; S/T : Matt Witten	November 25, 1998	E0215	13.43
190	9	"True North"	Arthur W. Forney	Ed Zuckerman	December 9, 1998	E0207	13.49
191	10	"Hate"	Constantine Makris	René Balcer	January 6, 1999	E0214	16.38
192	11	"Ramparts"	Matthew Penn	Kathy McCormick & Lynne Litt	January 13, 1999	E0211	16.62
193	12	"Haven"	David Platt	David Shore & I.C. Rapoport	February 10, 1999	E0219	13.55
194	13	"Hunters"	Richard Dobbs	S : William N. Fordes; S/T : Gerry Conway	February 10, 1999	E0218	15.29
195	14	"Sideshow"	Ed Sherin	René Balcer	February 17, 1999	E0210	15.63
196	15	"Disciple"	Martha Mitchell	S : Kathy McCormick; T : Richard Sweren; S/T : Lynne Litt	February 24, 1999	E0220	13.55
197	16	"Harm"	Richard Dobbs	René Balcer & Eddie Feldmann	March 3, 1999	E0213	12.93
198	17	"Shield"	Stephen Wertimer	T : René Balcer; S/T : David Shore & I.C. Rapoport	March 24, 1999	E0202	15.24
199	18	"Juvenile"	Lewis H. Gould	Richard Sweren & Lynne Litt	April 14, 1999	E0223	14.87
200	19	"Tabula Rasa"	Richard Dobbs	Kathy McCormick & William N. Fordes	April 21, 1999	E0222	16.45
201	20	"Empire"	Matthew Penn	S : René Balcer; S/T : Robert Palm	May 5, 1999	E0217	18.40
202	21	"Ambitious"	Christopher Misiano	S : Richard Sweren; S/T : Barry M. Schkolnick	May 12, 1999	E0221	15.06
203	22	"Admissions"	Jace Alexander	S : William N. Fordes; T : Kathy McCormick; S/T : Lynne E. Litt	May 19, 1999	E0224	14.96
204	23	"Refuge"	Constantine Makris	René Balcer	May 26, 1999	E0212	16.31
205	24	"Refuge"	Constantine Makris	René Balcer	May 26, 1999	E0225	19.29

=== Season 10 (1999–2000) ===
- Benjamin Bratt (Rey Curtis) left the cast at the end of the ninth season, and was replaced by Jesse L. Martin (Ed Green) this season. Steven Hill (Adam Schiff) left the cast at the end of the season; he was the last first-season cast member to leave the series.
- This was also the season that aired with the creation of the series’ first spin-off Law & Order: Special Victims Unit.

No. overall	No. in season	Title	Directed by	Written by	Original release date	Prod. code	U.S. viewers (millions)
206	1	"Gunshow"	Ed Sherin	René Balcer	September 22, 1999	E1106	18.63
207	2	"Killerz"	Constantine Makris	Richard Sweren	September 29, 1999	E1103	18.66
208	3	"DNR"	David Platt	S : William N. Fordes; T : Kathy McCormick	October 6, 1999	E1109	17.90
209	4	"Merger"	Stephen Wertimer	Lynn Mamet	October 13, 1999	E1101	16.84
210	5	"Justice"	Matthew Penn	S : William N. Fordes; S/T : Gerry Conway	November 10, 1999	E1104	17.70
211	6	"Marathon"	Jace Alexander	Richard Sweren & Matt Witten	November 17, 1999	E1105	17.69
212	7	"Patsy"	David Platt	René Balcer & Lynne E. Litt	November 24, 1999	E1102	17.64
213	8	"Blood Money"	Matthew Penn	Barry Schindel	December 1, 1999	E1111	15.24
214	9	"Sundown"	Jace Alexander	S : William N. Fordes; S/T : Krista Vernoff	December 15, 1999	E1107	19.29
215	10	"Loco Parentis"	Constantine Makris	Richard Sweren & Matt Witten	January 5, 2000	E1115	18.28
216	11	"Collision"	David Platt	S : William N. Fordes; S/T : Gerry Conway	January 26, 2000	E1116	18.13
217	12	"Mother's Milk"	Richard Dobbs	Lynn Mamet & Barry Schindel	February 9, 2000	E1110	18.38
218	13	"Panic"	Constantine Makris	S : Kathy McCormick & Matt Witten; T : William N. Fordes & Lynn Mamet	February 16, 2000	E1117	17.92
219	14	"Entitled"	Ed Sherin	S : Dick Wolf, René Balcer & Robert Palm; T : Richard Sweren	February 18, 2000	E1112	18.92
220	15	"Fools for Love"	Christopher Misiano	Kathy McCormick & Lynne E. Litt	February 23, 2000	E1113	15.11
221	16	"Trade This"	Jace Alexander	S : René Balcer; S/T : Barry Schindel	March 1, 2000	E1118	18.32
222	17	"Black, White and Blue"	Constantine Makris	S : Richard Sweren; T : Matt Witten; S/T : Lynne E. Litt	March 22, 2000	E1120	18.67
223	18	"Mega"	David Platt	Lynn Mamet & William N. Fordes	April 5, 2000	E1121	17.99
224	19	"Surrender Dorothy"	Martha Mitchell	Barry Schindel & Matt Witten	April 26, 2000	E1125	18.46
225	20	"Untitled"	Jace Alexander	S : Richard Sweren; S/T : Barry M. Schkolnick	May 3, 2000	E1124	16.42
226	21	"Narcosis"	Constantine Makris	Kathy McCormick & Lynne E. Litt	May 10, 2000	E1123	18.64
227	22	"High & Low"	Richard Dobbs	S : William N. Fordes; S/T : Gerry Conway	May 17, 2000	E1122	17.49
228	23	"Stiff"	Jace Alexander	S : René Balcer; S/T : Hall Powell	May 24, 2000	E1119	15.12
229	24	"Vaya Con Dios"	Christopher Misiano	René Balcer & Richard Sweren	May 24, 2000	E1108	19.48

=== Season 11 (2000–2001) ===
- Dianne Wiest joins the cast as Nora Lewin in this season and Angie Harmon (Abbie Carmichael) leaves the series at the end of this season. Former New York City mayor Rudolph Giuliani guest stars in the season opener, introducing Nora Lewin as Interim District Attorney.
- This is the first season not to premiere in September.

No. overall	No. in season	Title	Directed by	Written by	Original release date	Prod. code	U.S. viewers (millions)
230	1	"Endurance"	Constantine Makris	Matt Witten	October 18, 2000	E1304	17.77
231	2	"Turnstile Justice"	Richard Dobbs	Barry Schindel	October 25, 2000	E1303	16.67
232	3	"Dissonance"	Lewis H. Gould	Wendy Battles	November 1, 2000	E1307	17.60
233	4	"Standoff"	Jace Alexander	P.K. Todd	November 8, 2000	E1308	19.03
234	5	"Return"	Stephen Wertimer	Aaron Zelman	November 15, 2000	E1309	18.69
235	6	"Burn Baby Burn"	David Platt	Richard Sweren	November 22, 2000	E1306	18.29
236	7	"Amends"	Matthew Penn	William N. Fordes	November 29, 2000	E1302	19.41
237	8	"Thin Ice"	Jace Alexander	S : Bernard Goldberg; T : Barry Schindel & Matt Witten	December 20, 2000	E1310	18.22
238	9	"Hubris"	Constantine Makris	Kathy McCormick & Wendy Battles	January 10, 2001	E1311	20.34
239	10	"Whose Monkey Is It Anyway?"	Vincent Misiano	William M. Finkelstein	January 17, 2001	E1318	18.19
240	11	"Sunday in the Park with Jorge"	James Quinn	William M. Finkelstein	January 24, 2001	E1301	18.54
241	12	"Teenage Wasteland"	Constantine Makris	Barry Schindel & Aaron Zelman	February 7, 2001	E1315	19.31
242	13	"Phobia"	David Platt	Kathy McCormick & Lynn Mamet & Wendy Battles	February 14, 2001	E1313	20.07
243	14	"A Losing Season"	Jace Alexander	Barry Schindel & Wendy Battles	February 21, 2001	E1322	18.25
244	15	"Swept Away"	James Quinn	William M. Finkelstein	February 28, 2001	E1319	18.88
245	16	"Bronx Cheer"	Richard Dobbs	S : Wendy Battles; S/T : Richard Sweren	March 14, 2001	E1316	18.70
246	17	"Ego"	James Quinn	William N. Fordes & Wendy Battles	March 21, 2001	E1324	18.14
247	18	"White Lie"	Don Scardino	Richard Sweren & Aaron Zelman	April 4, 2001	E1312	17.96
248	19	"Whiplash"	Richard Dobbs	Matt Witten & Aaron Zelman	April 18, 2001	E1323	16.28
249	20	"All My Children"	David Platt	Barry Schindel & Noah Baylin	May 2, 2001	E1326	19.67
250	21	"Brother's Keeper"	Constantine Makris	René Balcer & Joe Gannon	May 9, 2001	E1325	18.82
251	22	"School Daze"	Richard Dobbs	S : Dick Wolf; T : Barry Schindel & Eric Overmyer	May 16, 2001	E1329	21.55
252	23	"Judge Dread"	David Platt	Richard Sweren & Aaron Zelman	May 23, 2001	E1327	16.96
253	24	"Deep Vote"	Jace Alexander	William N. Fordes & Matt Witten	May 23, 2001	E1331	20.03

=== Season 12 (2001–2002) ===
- Elisabeth Röhm joined the cast as Serena Southerlyn (character named after Dick Wolf’s daughter). Dianne Wiest (Nora Lewin) left the cast at the end of the season.
- In the aftermath of 9/11, the main title voiceover by Steven Zirnkilton was changed for the first few episodes to include the following dedication: "On September 11, 2001, New York City was ruthlessly and criminally attacked. While no tribute can ever heal the pain of that day, the producers of Law & Order dedicate this season to the victims & their families and to the firefighters & police officers who remind us with their lives & courage what it truly means to be an American".
- This voiceover was also heard at the beginning of Law & Order: Special Victims Unit and Law & Order: Criminal Intent, whose series premiere was suitably altered to reflect the events; the latter became L&O’s second spin-off.

No. overall	No. in season	Title	Directed by	Written by	Original release date	Prod. code	U.S. viewers (millions)
254	1	"Who Let the Dogs Out?"	Don Scardino	Kathy McCormick & Douglas Stark	September 26, 2001	E2208	20.68
255	2	"Armed Forces"	Martha Mitchell	Richard Sweren & Sean Jablonski	October 3, 2001	E2210	22.55
256	3	"For Love or Money"	Constantine Makris	Wendy Battles & Sean Jablonski	October 10, 2001	E2207	22.07
257	4	"Soldier of Fortune"	Richard Dobbs	Barry Schindel	October 24, 2001	E2206	21.39
258	5	"Possession"	James Quinn	Robert Palm	October 31, 2001	E2202	18.07
259	6	"Formerly Famous"	Richard Dobbs	Wendy Battles & Marc Guggenheim	November 7, 2001	E2201	18.96
260	7	"Myth of Fingerprints"	David Platt	S : Eric Overmyer; T : Terri Kopp & Aaron Zelman	November 14, 2001	E2209	20.42
261	8	"The Fire This Time"	David Platt	David Black	November 21, 2001	E2205	17.77
262	9	"3 Dawg Night"	Stephen Wertimer	S : Aaron Zelman; S/T : Richard Sweren	November 28, 2001	E2203	20.22
263	10	"Prejudice"	Ed Sherin	Jill Goldsmith	December 12, 2001	E2213	19.39
264	11	"The Collar"	Matthew Penn	Richard Sweren	January 9, 2002	E2214	19.95
265	12	"Undercovered"	Jace Alexander	Wendy Battles & Noah Baylin	January 16, 2002	E2220	21.17
266	13	"DR 1-102"	Richard Dobbs	Marc Guggenheim & Aaron Zelman	January 30, 2002	E2216	20.56
267	14	"Missing"	David Platt	S : Barry Schindel; T : Eric Overmyer & Matt Witten	February 6, 2002	E2212	18.95
268	15	"Access Nation"	Constantine Makris	Sean Jablonski & Terri Kopp	February 27, 2002	E2215	17.90
269	16	"Born Again"	Jace Alexander	S : William N. Fordes; T : Jill Goldsmith & Matt Witten	March 6, 2002	E2204	20.09
270	17	"Girl Most Likely"	Steve Shill	Lynn Mamet	March 27, 2002	E2227	19.25
271	18	"Equal Rights"	James Quinn	Terri Kopp	April 3, 2002	E2221	18.93
272	19	"Slaughter"	Constantine Makris	Rob Wright	April 10, 2002	E2218	19.54
273	20	"Dazzled"	Lewis H. Gould	Eric Overmyer & Matt Witten	April 24, 2002	E2224	19.15
274	21	"Foul Play"	Richard Dobbs	Richard Sweren & Stuart Feldman	May 1, 2002	E2222	19.30
275	22	"Attorney Client"	Matthew Penn	Jill Goldsmith	May 8, 2002	E2225	19.77
276	23	"Oxymoron"	Constantine Makris	Michael Harbert	May 15, 2002	E2217	18.30
277	24	"Patriot"	David Platt	William N. Fordes & Sean Jablonski	May 22, 2002	E2226	19.51

=== Season 13 (2002–2003) ===
- Dianne Wiest (Nora Lewin) was replaced by Fred Dalton Thompson (Arthur Branch) this season.
- This is the second season not to premiere in September.
- "Absentia" was the first episode in the series to have more than 1 director listed.
- With the October 9, 2002 telecast of its 279th episode, "Shangri-La," Law & Order surpassed the original Hawaii Five-O as TV's longest-running crime drama in prime-time, breaking a record that stood for 22 years.

No. overall	No. in season	Title	Directed by	Written by	Original release date	Prod. code	U.S. viewers (millions)
278	1	"American Jihad"	Constantine Makris	Aaron Zelman & Marc Guggenheim	October 2, 2002	E3304	19.13
279	2	"Shangri-La"	Constantine Makris	Michael S. Chernuchin	October 9, 2002	E3301	20.25
280	3	"True Crime"	Martha Mitchell	Wendy Battles & Noah Baylin	October 16, 2002	E3305	19.29
281	4	"Tragedy on Rye"	David Platt	William N. Fordes	October 30, 2002	E3303	20.16
282	5	"The Ring"	Richard Dobbs	Michael S. Chernuchin	November 6, 2002	E3309	18.44
283	6	"Hitman"	Richard Dobbs	Eric Overmyer	November 13, 2002	E3302	19.02
284	7	"Open Season"	Matthew Penn	Richard Sweren	November 20, 2002	E3306	17.98
285	8	"Asterisk"	Steve Shill	Terri Kopp	November 27, 2002	E3308	15.84
286	9	"The Wheel"	Richard Dobbs	Jill Goldsmith	December 11, 2002	E3307	19.62
287	10	"Mother's Day"	Jace Alexander	Janis Diamond	January 8, 2003	E3311	19.55
288	11	"Chosen"	Ed Sherin	Michael S. Chernuchin	January 15, 2003	E3310	19.03
289	12	"Under God"	Gloria Muzio	Marc Guggenheim & Noah Baylin	February 5, 2003	E3313	18.33
290	13	"Absentia"	Martha Mitchell & Darnell Martin	Eric Overmyer	February 12, 2003	E3314	18.38
291	14	"Star Crossed"	David Platt	Richard Sweren	February 19, 2003	E3315	19.81
292	15	"Bitch"	Constantine Makris	Michael S. Chernuchin & Roz Weinman	February 26, 2003	E3320	19.63
293	16	"Suicide Box"	Matthew Penn	Aaron Zelman	March 26, 2003	E3312	16.48
294	17	"Genius"	Jace Alexander	William N. Fordes	April 2, 2003	E3318	15.47
295	18	"Maritime"	Gloria Muzio	Wendy Battles	April 17, 2003	E3319	15.48
296	19	"Seer"	James Quinn	Jill Goldsmith	April 23, 2003	E3316	18.09
297	20	"Kid Pro Quo"	David Platt	Eric Overmyer & Roz Weinman	April 30, 2003	E3325	18.09
298	21	"House Calls"	Jace Alexander	Janis Diamond	May 7, 2003	E3323	17.46
299	22	"Sheltered"	Richard Dobbs	Terri Kopp	May 14, 2003	E3324	18.33
300	23	"Couples"	David Platt	Lorenzo Carcaterra	May 21, 2003	E3317	16.01
301	24	"Smoke"	Constantine Makris	S : Dick Wolf; T : Michael S. Chernuchin	May 21, 2003	E3322	19.02

=== Season 14 (2003–2004) ===
- This is the second of five seasons in the series that had an unchanged cast from the previous season.
- Jerry Orbach (Lennie Briscoe) left the cast at the end of the season. The character Lennie Briscoe retired from the 27th Precinct and was transferred to the series' third spin-off, Law & Order: Trial by Jury, which premiered with L&O next season.

No. overall	No. in season	Title	Directed by	Written by	Original release date	Prod. code	U.S. viewers (millions)
302	1	"Bodies"	Constantine Makris	S : Michael S. Chernuchin; S/T : William N. Fordes	September 24, 2003	E4302	20.86
303	2	"Bounty"	Matthew Penn	Michael S. Chernuchin	October 1, 2003	E4304	17.50
304	3	"Patient Zero"	David Platt	Wendy Battles	October 8, 2003	E4301	16.47
305	4	"Shrunk"	Jace Alexander	Richard Sweren	October 22, 2003	E4305	16.60
306	5	"Blaze"	Gloria Muzio	Marc Guggenheim & Aaron Zelman & Michael S. Chernuchin	October 29, 2003	E4309	16.17
307	6	"Identity"	Jace Alexander	Janis Diamond	November 5, 2003	E4311	16.38
308	7	"Floater"	Richard Dobbs	Eric Overmyer	November 12, 2003	E4307	18.93
309	8	"Embedded"	Ed Sherin	Craig Turk	November 19, 2003	E4303	17.53
310	9	"Compassion"	Constantine Makris	Roz Weinman	November 26, 2003	E4308	14.74
311	10	"Ill-Conceived"	David Platt	Aaron Zelman & Noah Baylin & Michael S. Chernuchin	December 3, 2003	E4306	16.61
312	11	"Darwinian"	Jace Alexander	Marc Guggenheim	January 7, 2004	E4313	17.99
313	12	"Payback"	Constantine Makris	Lorenzo Carcaterra	January 14, 2004	E4310	17.23
314	13	"Married with Children"	Richard Dobbs	Wendy Battles & William N. Fordes	February 4, 2004	E4315	17.33
315	14	"City Hall"	Gloria Muzio	Richard Sweren & Marc Guggenheim	February 11, 2004	E4318	16.96
316	15	"Veteran's Day"	David Platt	Noah Baylin	February 18, 2004	E4314	18.04
317	16	"Can I Get a Witness?"	Don Scardino	Aaron Zelman	February 25, 2004	E4320	16.73
318	17	"Hands Free"	Gloria Muzio	Janis Diamond	March 3, 2004	E4316	14.61
319	18	"Evil Breeds"	Constantine Makris	S : Barry Schindel; S/T : Noah Baylin	March 24, 2004	E4326	15.05
320	19	"Nowhere Man"	Martha Mitchell	William N. Fordes	March 31, 2004	E4324	17.86
321	20	"Everybody Loves Raimondo's"	Richard Dobbs	S : Richard Sweren; S/T : Lorenzo Carcaterra	April 14, 2004	E4327	16.16
322	21	"Vendetta"	David Platt	S : Michael S. Chernuchin; S/T : David Nahmod	April 21, 2004	E4317	17.21
323	22	"Gaijin"	Jace Alexander	Wendy Battles	April 28, 2004	E4325	17.19
324	23	"Caviar Emptor"	Richard Dobbs	Roz Weinman	May 12, 2004	E4321	15.86
325	24	"C.O.D."	Matthew Penn	Richard Sweren & Marc Guggenheim	May 19, 2004	E4319	19.46

=== Season 15 (2004–2005) ===
- Dennis Farina joined the cast as Joe Fontana this season.
- Elisabeth Röhm (Serena Southerlyn) left the cast midway through the season in the episode "Ain't No Love"; she was replaced by Annie Parisse as Alexandra Borgia in the episode "Fluency".
- Michael Imperioli temporarily replaced Jesse L. Martin (Ed Green) in the last four episodes as Nick Falco while Martin was filming Rent.
- The series' third spin-off was created, Law & Order: Trial by Jury this season. It featured Jerry Orbach reprising his role as Lennie Briscoe, before his death in 2004.
- This was the final season to have 24 episodes.

No. overall	No. in season	Title	Directed by	Written by	Original release date	Prod. code	U.S. viewers (millions)
326	1	"Paradigm"	Matthew Penn	S : Dick Wolf; T : Richard Sweren	September 22, 2004	E5301	18.86
327	2	"The Dead Wives Club"	David Platt	Nick Santora	September 22, 2004	E5307	15.39
328	3	"The Brotherhood"	Jean de Segonzac	S : Wendy Battles; S/T : Alfredo Barrios, Jr.	September 29, 2004	E5304	12.94
329	4	"Coming Down Hard"	Richard Dobbs	Davey Holmes	October 6, 2004	E5308	12.51
330	5	"Gunplay"	Constantine Makris	William N. Fordes & Lois Johnson	October 20, 2004	E5306	13.07
331	6	"Cut"	Richard Dobbs	Wendy Battles	October 27, 2004	E5302	13.23
332	7	"Gov Love"	Michael Pressman	Richard Sweren & Ross Berger	November 10, 2004	E5313	15.15
333	8	"Cry Wolf"	Don Scardino	Nick Santora & Lorenzo Carcaterra	November 17, 2004	E5312	13.81
334	9	"All in the Family"	Jace Alexander	William N. Fordes	November 24, 2004	E5303	12.62
335	10	"Enemy"	Richard Dobbs	Alfredo Barrios, Jr.	December 1, 2004	E5314	14.71
336	11	"Fixed"	Ed Sherin	Roz Weinman & Eric Overmyer	December 8, 2004	E5311	15.69
337	12	"Mammon"	Jace Alexander	William N. Fordes & Douglas Stark	January 5, 2005	E5316	14.28
338	13	"Ain't No Love"	Paris Barclay	Richard Sweren & Lois Johnson	January 12, 2005	E5315	14.69
339	14	"Fluency"	Matthew Penn	Nick Santora	January 19, 2005	E5318	15.12
340	15	"Obsession"	Constantine Makris	Wendy Battles & Alfredo Barrios, Jr.	February 9, 2005	E5319	13.16
341	16	"The Sixth Man"	David Platt	S : Richard Sweren; S/T : Lois Johnson	February 16, 2005	E5321	13.74
342	17	"License to Kill"	Constantine Makris	Richard Sweren & Stuart Feldman	February 23, 2005	E5322	14.54
343	18	"Dining Out"	Jean de Segonzac	Davey Holmes	March 2, 2005	E5317	14.66
344	19	"Sects"	Richard Dobbs	Frank Pugliese	March 30, 2005	E5324	13.49
345	20	"Tombstone"	Eric Stoltz	Rick Eid	April 13, 2005	E5325	16.85
346	21	"Publish and Perish"	Constantine Makris	Tom Szentgyörgyi	April 20, 2005	E5328	14.33
347	22	"Sport of Kings"	Michael Pressman	S : Nick Santora; S/T : Richard Sweren & Wendy Battles	May 4, 2005	E5323	11.70
348	23	"In God We Trust"	David Platt	Richard Sweren	May 11, 2005	E5326	12.22
349	24	"Locomotion"	Matthew Penn	S : Roz Weinman; T : Eric Overmyer	May 18, 2005	E5329	12.41

=== Season 16 (2005–2006) ===
- This is the third season that had an unchanged cast in between seasons, as every principal cast member who finished season 15 returned.
  - This is Annie Parisse's first full season in the role of ADA Alexandra Borgia. She joined the cast in the 14th episode of the previous season. In the season finale episode 'Invaders', ADA Alexandra Borgia is brutally murdered. Annie Parisse wanted out of her contract, so she quit the show.
- Parisse and Dennis Farina (Joe Fontana) leave the cast after the season finale.
- Michael Imperioli (Nick Falco) reprises his role in the episode "Hindsight".

No. overall	No. in season	Title	Directed by	Written by	Original release date	Prod. code	U.S. viewers (millions)
350	1	"Red Ball"	Matthew Penn	David Wilcox	September 21, 2005	16001	13.04
351	2	"Flaw"	Jean de Segonzac	Chris Levinson	September 28, 2005	16002	15.06
352	3	"Ghosts"	Constantine Makris	Rick Eid	October 5, 2005	16003	12.60
353	4	"Age of Innocence"	David Platt	Davey Holmes	October 12, 2005	16005	10.92
354	5	"Lifeline"	Rosemary Rodriguez	Greg Plageman	October 19, 2005	16006	12.33
355	6	"Birthright"	Constantine Makris	David Slack	November 2, 2005	16007	12.57
356	7	"House of Cards"	Michael Pressman	Wendy Battles	November 9, 2005	16008	10.86
357	8	"New York Minute"	Don Scardino	Nicholas Wootton	November 16, 2005	16009	11.44
358	9	"Criminal Law"	Ed Sherin	David Wilcox	November 23, 2005	16010	11.93
359	10	"Acid"	Michael Pressman	Richard Sweren	November 30, 2005	16011	12.87
360	11	"Bible Story"	Rick Wallace	Richard Sweren	December 7, 2005	16004	12.13
361	12	"Family Friend"	Jean de Segonzac	Philippe Browning	January 11, 2006	16012	12.83
362	13	"Heart of Darkness"	Richard Dobbs	Carter Harris	January 18, 2006	16013	12.38
363	14	"Magnet"	Adam Bernstein	David Black	February 8, 2006	16014	14.53
364	15	"Choice of Evils"	Michael Pressman	David Wilcox	March 1, 2006	16016	12.39
365	16	"Cost of Capital"	Michael Watkins	S : Rick Eid; T : Tom Smuts	March 8, 2006	16015	11.79
366	17	"America, Inc."	Jean de Segonzac	Richard Sweren	March 22, 2006	16017	9.00
367	18	"Thinking Makes It So"	Tony Goldwyn	Michael S. Chernuchin	March 29, 2006	16019	9.35
368	19	"Positive"	Richard Dobbs	Sonny Postiglione	April 5, 2006	16020	10.84
369	20	"Kingmaker"	Don Scardino	David Slack	May 3, 2006	16018	10.66
370	21	"Hindsight"	Jean de Segonzac	Chris Levinson	May 10, 2006	16021	12.68
371	22	"Invaders"	Matthew Penn	Richard Sweren & David Wilcox	May 17, 2006	16022	13.59

=== Season 17 (2006–2007) ===
- Alana de la Garza (Connie Rubirosa) and Milena Govich (Nina Cassady) joined the cast.
- Fred Dalton Thompson (Arthur Branch) and Milena Govich left the cast after the season finale. Thompson left the show to focus on his upcoming 2008 presidential bid. In the coming season, Waterson's character (McCoy) succeeded Branch to become District Attorney. Govich was replaced by Jeremy Sisto (who guest stars as a defense lawyer in the episode "The Family Hour") who joined the cast as Cyrus Lupo in the next season.

No. overall	No. in season	Title	Directed by	Written by	Original release date	Prod. code	U.S. viewers (millions)
372	1	"Fame"	Jean de Segonzac	Nicholas Wootton	September 22, 2006	17001	11.07
373	2	"Avatar"	Vincent Misiano	David Slack	September 29, 2006	17002	10.03
374	3	"Home Sweet"	Richard Dobbs	Michael S. Chernuchin	October 6, 2006	17003	9.64
375	4	"Fear America"	Constantine Makris	Sonny Postiglione & Robert Nathan	October 13, 2006	17004	9.43
376	5	"Public Service Homicide"	Constantine Makris	Chris Levinson	October 20, 2006	17005	10.20
377	6	"Profiteer"	Arthur W. Forney	David Wilcox	October 27, 2006	17007	9.02
378	7	"In Vino Veritas"	Tim Hunter	David Wilcox	November 3, 2006	17006	10.87
379	8	"Release"	Michael Pressman	Rick Eid & Nicholas Wootton	November 10, 2006	17008	9.57
380	9	"Deadlock"	Alex Chapple	David Slack	November 17, 2006	17009	9.94
381	10	"Corner Office"	Joan Stein Schimke	Rick Eid & Richard Sweren	December 8, 2006	17010	10.23
382	11	"Remains of the Day"	Constantine Makris	S : Shiya Ribowsky; S/T : David Wilcox	January 5, 2007	17011	9.77
383	12	"Charity Case"	Michael Pressman	Nicholas Wootton	January 12, 2007	17012	9.02
384	13	"Talking Points"	Matthew Penn	Michael S. Chernuchin	February 2, 2007	17013	9.53
385	14	"Church"	Constantine Makris	Rick Eid	February 9, 2007	17014	9.63
386	15	"Melting Pot"	Jean de Segonzac	Richard Sweren	February 16, 2007	17015	9.01
387	16	"Murder Book"	Constantine Makris	David Wilcox	February 23, 2007	17016	8.67
388	17	"Good Faith"	Sam Weisman	David Slack	March 30, 2007	17017	7.47
389	18	"Bling"	Karen Gaviola	Matthew McGough	April 6, 2007	17018	8.22
390	19	"Fallout"	Constantine Makris	Sonny Postiglione	April 27, 2007	17019	7.52
391	20	"Captive"	Michael Watkins	Richard Sweren	May 4, 2007	17020	8.88
392	21	"Over Here"	Constantine Makris	William N. Fordes	May 11, 2007	17021	8.30
393	22	"The Family Hour"	Matthew Penn	Richard Sweren & David Slack	May 18, 2007	17022	9.23

=== Season 18 (2008) ===
- Jeremy Sisto (Det. Cyrus Lupo), and Linus Roache (new ADA Michael Cutter), joined the cast.
- Jesse L. Martin's character, Det. Ed Green, retired from detective work under messy circumstances in episode #14 titled "Burn Card". Anthony Anderson (Det. Kevin Bernard), took his place in the squad room, partnering with Det. Lupo. Martin played Det. Green for 9 seasons, from 1999 to 2008, totaling 198 episodes. He is the fifth-longest serving cast member on the show.
- This is the first season to feature only 18 episodes
- This was also the shortest season in the initial run of the show and the first to air mid-season until the show's revival with Season 21 in 2022.
- Production of the eighteenth season was interrupted by the 2007–08 Writers Guild of America strike when executive producer René Balcer and the rest of the writing staff participated in the work stoppage, making this season the first to start in January and also caused its original twenty-two-episode order to be reduced to eighteen.

No. overall	No. in season	Title	Directed by	Written by	Original release date	Prod. code	U.S. viewers (millions)
394	1	"Called Home"	Allen Coulter	René Balcer	January 2, 2008	18001	13.46
395	2	"Darkness"	Michael Dinner	William N. Fordes & David Slack	January 2, 2008	18006	13.46
396	3	"Misbegotten"	Michael Watkins	David Wilcox & Stephanie Sengupta	January 9, 2008	18002	11.02
397	4	"Bottomless"	Alex Chapple	Ed Zuckerman	January 16, 2008	18004	11.59
398	5	"Driven"	Alan Taylor	Richard Sweren & Gina Gionfriddo	January 23, 2008	18009	10.35
399	6	"Political Animal"	Jean de Segonzac	Ed Zuckerman & David Slack	January 30, 2008	18011	11.10
400	7	"Quit Claim"	Jim McKay	William N. Fordes & David Wilcox	February 6, 2008	18010	10.06
401	8	"Illegal"	Constantine Makris	William N. Fordes & David Slack	February 13, 2008	18003	10.23
402	9	"Executioner"	Constantine Makris	Richard Sweren & Gina Gionfriddo	February 20, 2008	18012	10.86
403	10	"Tango"	Dean White	Stephanie Sengupta	February 27, 2008	18013	11.42
404	11	"Betrayal"	Marc Levin	Richard Sweren & Gina Gionfriddo	March 5, 2008	18005	9.63
405	12	"Submission"	Constantine Makris	Ed Zuckerman	March 12, 2008	18007	11.85
406	13	"Angelgrove"	Darnell Martin	David Wilcox & Stephanie Sengupta	March 19, 2008	18008	10.49
407	14	"Burn Card"	Mario Van Peebles	Ed Zuckerman & David Wilcox	April 23, 2008	18014	12.75
408	15	"Bogeyman"	Tim Hunter	S : Gina Gionfriddo; S/T : Richard Sweren	April 30, 2008	18015	9.65
409	16	"Strike"	Marisol Torres	William N. Fordes & David Slack	May 7, 2008	18016	8.85
410	17	"Personae Non Gratae"	John Coles	Stephanie Sengupta & Matthew McGough	May 14, 2008	18017	8.46
411	18	"Excalibur"	Jim McKay	René Balcer & Ed Zuckerman	May 21, 2008	18018	8.57

=== Season 19 (2008–2009) ===
- This was the fourth season that had an unchanged cast from the end of the previous season, and it was the first season to start in November.
  - This is Anthony Anderson's first full season in the role of Det. Kevin Bernard. He joined the cast in the 14th episode of the previous season.
- During this season, Law & Order: UK made its debut in the United Kingdom on ITV1.

No. overall	No. in season	Title	Directed by	Written by	Original release date	Prod. code	U.S. viewers (millions)
412	1	"Rumble"	Constantine Makris	Richard Sweren & Christopher Ambrose	November 5, 2008	19003	7.94
413	2	"Challenged"	Fred Berner	René Balcer & Ed Zuckerman	November 12, 2008	19001	7.93
414	3	"Lost Boys"	Christopher Zalla	Richard Sweren & Gina Gionfriddo	November 19, 2008	19004	7.62
415	4	"Falling"	Michael Watkins	Stephanie Sengupta & Keith Eisner	November 26, 2008	19005	6.33
416	5	"Knock Off"	Constantine Makris	S : Jonathan Rintels; T : William N. Fordes & Matthew McGough	December 3, 2008	19006	11.31
417	6	"Sweetie"	Mario Van Peebles	Ed Zuckerman & Luke Schelhaas	December 10, 2008	19007	7.51
418	7	"Zero"	Marisol Torres	Ed Zuckerman & Luke Schelhaas	December 17, 2008	19002	7.02
419	8	"Chattel"	Jim McKay	William N. Fordes & Matthew McGough	January 7, 2009	19009	10.26
420	9	"By Perjury"	Darnell Martin	Richard Sweren & Christopher Ambrose	January 14, 2009	19010	8.26
421	10	"Pledge"	Alex Chapple	Richard Sweren & Gina Gionfriddo	January 21, 2009	19008	8.27
422	11	"Lucky Stiff"	Marc Levin	Ed Zuckerman & Matthew McGough	January 28, 2009	19012	8.96
423	12	"Illegitimate"	Josh Marston	Stephanie Sengupta & Keith Eisner	February 4, 2009	19011	8.64
424	13	"Crimebusters"	Alex Chapple	Richard Sweren & Gina Gionfriddo	February 11, 2009	19013	7.44
425	14	"Rapture"	Fred Berner	Ed Zuckerman & Luke Schelhaas	February 18, 2009	19014	7.23
426	15	"Bailout"	Jean de Segonzac	Richard Sweren & Christopher Ambrose	March 11, 2009	19015	7.64
427	16	"Take-Out"	Jim McKay	William N. Fordes & Keith Eisner	March 18, 2009	19016	7.14
428	17	"Anchors Away"	Alex Chapple	Ed Zuckerman & Matthew McGough	March 25, 2009	19017	7.33
429	18	"Promote This!"	Michael Watkins	Richard Sweren & Christopher Ambrose	April 29, 2009	19019	7.83
430	19	"All New"	Roger Young	William N. Fordes & Keith Eisner	May 6, 2009	19020	8.14
431	20	"Exchange"	Ernest Dickerson	Stephanie Sengupta	May 13, 2009	19018	7.90
432	21	"Skate or Die"	Norberto Barba	Ed Zuckerman & Luke Schelhaas	May 20, 2009	19021	6.67
433	22	"The Drowned and the Saved"	Fred Berner	Richard Sweren & Gina Gionfriddo	June 3, 2009	19022	8.87

=== Season 20 (2009–2010) ===
- NBC canceled Law & Order on May 14, 2010. The show ran for 20 consecutive seasons and the series finale aired on May 24, 2010.
- This was the fifth (and final) season in which the series had an unchanged cast from the previous season.
- Benjamin Bratt reprised his role of Det. Rey Curtis in the episode "Fed".
- Prior to the show's cancellation, S. Epatha Merkerson (Lt. Anita Van Buren) announced she was leaving the show in the season finale. She had played Lt. Van Buren for 16 years, with season 20 being her 17th and final season.

No. overall	No. in season	Title	Directed by	Written by	Original release date	Prod. code	U.S. viewers (millions)
434	1	"Memo from the Dark Side"	Fred Berner	René Balcer & Keith Eisner	September 25, 2009	20001	6.25
435	2	"Just a Girl in the World"	M.T. Adler	Richard Sweren & Christopher Ambrose	October 2, 2009	20002	6.79
436	3	"Great Satan"	Michael Dinner	Ed Zuckerman & Luke Schelhaas	October 9, 2009	20003	7.22
437	4	"Reality Bites"	Constantine Makris	Ed Zuckerman & Luke Schelhaas	October 16, 2009	20004	7.73
438	5	"Dignity"	Jim McKay	Richard Sweren & Julie Martin	October 23, 2009	20005	7.24
439	6	"Human Flesh Search Engine"	Darnell Martin	Ed Zuckerman & Matthew McGough	October 30, 2009	20006	7.07
440	7	"Boy Gone Astray"	Rose Troche	S : René Balcer; S/T : Keith Eisner	November 6, 2009	20007	7.98
441	8	"Doped"	Mario Van Peebles	Richard Sweren & Christopher Ambrose	November 6, 2009	20008	8.29
442	9	"For the Defense"	William Klayer	Ed Zuckerman & Luke Schelhaas	November 13, 2009	20009	7.42
443	10	"Shotgun"	Roger Young	Richard Sweren & Julie Martin	November 20, 2009	20010	7.52
444	11	"Fed"	Alex Chapple	S : René Balcer; S/T : Keith Eisner	December 11, 2009	20011	8.81
445	12	"Blackmail"	Marc Levin	Ed Zuckerman & Matthew McGough	January 15, 2010	20012	7.21
446	13	"Steel-Eyed Death"	Michael Pressman	Richard Sweren & Christopher Ambrose & Julie Martin	March 1, 2010	20013	7.76
447	14	"Boy on Fire"	Rose Troche	S : Ed Zuckerman; T : Luke Schelhaas; S/T : Matthew McGough	March 1, 2010	20014	7.76
448	15	"Brilliant Disguise"	Alex Chapple	S : René Balcer; S/T : Keith Eisner	March 8, 2010	20015	5.21
449	16	"Innocence"	Fred Berner	Richard Sweren & Julie Martin	March 15, 2010	20016	6.95
450	17	"Four Cops Shot"	Jim McKay	Ed Zuckerman & Luke Schelhaas & Matthew McGough	March 22, 2010	20017	6.02
451	18	"Brazil"	Jean de Segonzac	S : René Balcer; S/T : Keith Eisner	March 29, 2010	20018	6.01
452	19	"Crashers"	Darnell Martin	Richard Sweren & Christopher Ambrose & Julie Martin	May 3, 2010	20019	6.18
453	20	"The Taxman Cometh"	Fred Berner	S : Ed Zuckerman; S/T : William N. Fordes	May 10, 2010	20020	6.22
454	21	"Immortal"	Jim McKay	Richard Sweren & Julie Martin	May 17, 2010	20021	6.12
455	22	"Love Eternal"	William Klayer	Ed Zuckerman	May 17, 2010	20022	6.12
456	23	"Rubber Room"	René Balcer	René Balcer	May 24, 2010	20023	7.84

=== Season 21 (2022) ===
- This season marks the show's revival after being cancelled 12 years prior on May 14, 2010, with the series finale airing on May 24, 2010. The show had run for 20 consecutive seasons.
- Jeffrey Donovan, Camryn Manheim, Hugh Dancy, and Odelya Halevi joined the main cast for the revival season. Manheim previously guest-starred as three separate characters in seasons 1, 3, & 4. Donovan previously guest-starred as two separate characters in seasons 6 & 17.
- Anthony Anderson and Sam Waterston were the only actors, playing their same characters from the 2010 season, to return for the revival.
- Anderson left the show at the end of this season, deciding not to renew his contract.

No. overall	No. in season	Title	Directed by	Written by	Original release date	Prod. code	U.S viewers (millions)
457	1	"The Right Thing"	Jean de Segonzac	Dick Wolf & Rick Eid	February 24, 2022	2101	5.80
458	2	"Impossible Dream"	Michael Pressman	Teleplay by : Rick Eid; Story by : Pamela Wechsler & Rick Eid	March 3, 2022	2102	4.46
459	3	"Filtered Life"	Milena Govich	Art Alamo & Pamela Wechsler	March 10, 2022	2103	4.21
460	4	"Fault Lines"	Heather Cappiello	Pamela Wechsler & Art Alamo	March 17, 2022	2104	4.62
461	5	"Free Speech"	Alex Hall	Rick Eid	April 7, 2022	2105	3.91
462	6	"Wicked Game"	Alex Hall	Teleplay by : Rick Eid; Story by : Pamela Wechsler & Art Alamo	April 14, 2022	2106	4.02
463	7	"Legacy"	Sarah Boyd	Pamela Wechsler	April 28, 2022	2107	4.15
464	8	"Severance"	Yangzom Brauen	Art Alamo	May 5, 2022	2108	4.23
465	9	"The Great Pretender"	Alex Hall	Rick Eid & Pamela Wechsler	May 12, 2022	2109	3.83
466	10	"Black and Blue"	Eriq La Salle	Rick Eid	May 19, 2022	2110	3.94

=== Season 22 (2022–2023) ===
- Mehcad Brooks joins the main cast as Detective Jalen Shaw, following the departure of Anthony Anderson. Brooks previously guest-starred as Prince Miller in season 13 of Law & Order: Special Victims Unit.
- Jeffrey Donovan left the show after the season.
- Sam Waterston makes his 400th appearance in the season finale.

No. overall	No. in season	Title	Directed by	Written by	Original release date	Prod. code	U.S viewers (millions)
467	1	"Gimme Shelter – Part Three"	Alex Hall	Rick Eid & Gwen Sigan	September 22, 2022	2201	4.69
468	2	"Battle Lines"	Milena Govich	Art Alamo	September 29, 2022	2202	4.40
469	3	"Camouflage"	John Behring	Pamela Wechsler	October 6, 2022	2203	4.06
470	4	"Benefit of the Doubt"	Carl Weathers	Peter Blauner	October 13, 2022	2204	4.09
471	5	"12 Seconds"	David Grossman	Jonathan Collier	October 27, 2022	2205	4.18
472	6	"Vicious Cycle"	Bethany Rooney	Teleplay by : Pamela Wechsler & Rick Eid; Story by : Pamela Wechsler	November 3, 2022	2206	3.73
473	7	"Only the Lonely"	Elisabeth Röhm	Pamela Wechsler & Jennifer Vanderbes	November 10, 2022	2207	4.07
474	8	"Chain of Command"	Carlos Bernard	Art Alamo & Gia Gordon	November 17, 2022	2208	4.56
475	9	"The System"	Alex Hall	Rick Eid & Pamela Wechsler	December 8, 2022	2209	4.41
476	10	"Land of Opportunity"	Timothy Busfield	Art Alamo	January 5, 2023	2210	4.73
477	11	"Second Chance"	Rachel Leiterman	Pamela Wechsler & Jonathan Collier	January 12, 2023	2211	4.64
478	12	"Almost Famous"	Bethany Rooney	Pamela Wechsler & Jennifer Vanderbes	January 26, 2023	2212	5.38
479	13	"Mammon"	Joy Lane	Keith Eisner	February 2, 2023	2213	4.98
480	14	"Heroes"	Alex Hall	Rick Eid	February 16, 2023	2214	4.75
481	15	"Fear and Loathing"	Yangzom Brauen	Teleplay by : Pamela Wechsler; Story by : Pamela Wechsler & Ajani Jackson	February 23, 2023	2215	4.71
482	16	"Deadline"	Martha Mitchell	Art Alamo & Gia Gordon	March 23, 2023	2216	4.41
483	17	"Bias"	Alex Hall	Keith Eisner	March 30, 2023	2217	4.22
484	18	"Collateral Damage"	Jean de Segonzac	Pamela Wechsler	April 6, 2023	2218	4.40
485	19	"Private Lives"	Néstor Carbonell	Art Alamo	April 27, 2023	2219	3.92
486	20	"Class Retreat"	Milena Govich	Teleplay by : Rick Eid & Keith Eisner; Story by : Rick Eid	May 4, 2023	2220	4.18
487	21	"Appraisal"	Michael Pressman	Pamela Wechsler & Jennifer Vanderbes	May 11, 2023	2221	3.93
488	22	"Open Wounds"	Alex Hall	Teleplay by : Rick Eid & Pamela Wechsler; Story by : Gia Gordon & Ajani Jackson	May 18, 2023	2222	3.96

=== Season 23 (2024) ===
- Reid Scott (Det. Vincent Riley) joins the main cast in the season premiere, "Freedom of Expression".
- Sam Waterston (DA Jack McCoy) departed the series in the fifth episode, "Last Dance".
- Tony Goldwyn (DA Nicholas Baxter) joins the main cast in the seventh episode, "Balance of Power".
- Camryn Manheim (Lieutenant Kate Dixon) departed the series in the season finale, "In Harm's Way".
- The penultimate episode of the season is the series' milestone 500th episode.

No. overall	No. in season	Title	Directed by	Written by	Original release date	Prod. code	U.S viewers (millions)
489	1	"Freedom of Expression"	Alex Hall	Teleplay by : Rick Eid & Pamela Wechsler; Story by : Dick Wolf & Rick Eid	January 18, 2024	2301	5.32
490	2	"Human Innovations"	Rachel Leiterman	Art Alamo	January 25, 2024	2302	4.60
491	3	"Turn the Page"	Michael Smith	Rick Eid	February 1, 2024	2304	4.85
492	4	"Unintended Consequences"	Martha Mitchell	Pamela Wechsler & Gia Gordon	February 8, 2024	2303	4.56
493	5	"Last Dance"	Alex Hall	Rick Eid & Pamela Wechsler	February 22, 2024	2305	4.87
494	6	"On the Ledge"	David Grossman	Pamela Wechsler and Jennifer Vanderbes	February 29, 2024	2306	4.70
495	7	"Balance of Power"	Carlos Bernard	Art Alamo and Ted Malawer	March 14, 2024	2307	4.19
496	8	"Facade"	Michael Smith	Art Alamo & Ajani Jackson	March 21, 2024	2308	3.99
497	9	"Family Ties"	Michael Pressman	Pamela Wechsler & Ted Malawer	April 11, 2024	2309	3.85
498	10	"Inconvenient Truth"	Alex Hall	Teleplay by : Rick Eid & Pamela Wechsler; Story by : Gia Gordon & Rick Eid & Pamela Wechsler	April 18, 2024	2310	4.51
499	11	"Castle in the Sky"	Milena Govich	Art Alamo	May 2, 2024	2311	3.84
500	12	"No Good Deed"	Eriq La Salle	Rick Eid	May 9, 2024	2312	3.67
501	13	"In Harm's Way"	Alex Hall	Pamela Wechsler & Jennifer Vanderbes	May 16, 2024	2313	3.68

=== Season 24 (2024–2025) ===
- Maura Tierney joins the main cast as Lieutenant Jessica Brady.
- Mehcad Brooks departed the series following the season finale, "Look the Other Way".

No. overall	No. in season	Title	Directed by	Written by	Original release date	Prod. code	U.S viewers (millions)
502	1	"Catch and Kill"	Eriq La Salle	Rick Eid & Art Alamo	October 3, 2024	2401	3.64
503	2	"The Perfect Man"	David Grossman	Scott Gold	October 10, 2024	2402	3.45
504	3	"Big Brother"	Alex Hall	Rick Eid	October 17, 2024	2403	3.09
505	4	"The Meaning of Life"	Leslie Hope	Jennifer Vanderbes	October 24, 2024	2404	3.33
506	5	"Report Card"	Néstor Carbonell	Pamela Wechsler & Ajani Jackson	October 31, 2024	2405	3.62
507	6	"Time Will Tell"	Milena Govich	Rick Eid & Scott Gold	November 7, 2024	2406	3.49
508	7	"Truth and Consequences"	Fred Berner	Pamela Wechsler	November 14, 2024	2407	3.35
509	8	"Bad Apple"	Michael Smith	Art Alamo	November 21, 2024	2408	3.76
510	9	"Enemy of the State"	Alex Hall	Scott Gold & Ajani Jackson	January 16, 2025	2409	4.16
511	10	"Greater Good"	Eriq La Salle	Teleplay by : Rick Eid & Ajani Jackson; Story by : Rick Eid	January 23, 2025	2410	4.33
512	11	"The Hardest Thing"	Michael Pressman	Art Alamo	January 30, 2025	2411	4.12
513	12	"Duty to Protect"	David Grossman	Pamela Wechsler	February 13, 2025	2412	4.19
514	13	"In God We Trust"	John Behring	Jennifer Vanderbes	February 20, 2025	2413	4.09
515	14	"A Price to Pay"	Laura Belsey	Scott Gold & William Lapp	February 27, 2025	2414	4.03
516	15	"Crossing Lines"	Fred Berner	Pamela Wechsler & Marley Schneier	March 13, 2025	2415	3.53
517	16	"Folk Hero"	Carlos Bernard	Rick Eid & Scott Gold	March 20, 2025	2416	3.82
518	17	"A Perfect Family"	Michael Smith	Rick Eid & Jennifer Vanderbes	April 3, 2025	2417	3.66
519	18	"Inherent Bias"	Néstor Carbonell	Art Alamo & Jolie Huang	April 10, 2025	2418	3.66
520	19	"Play with Fire Part 1"	Jean de Segonzac	Rick Eid & Art Alamo	April 17, 2025	2419	3.97
521	20	"Sins of the Father"	Sharon Lewis	Scott Gold & Ajani Jackson	May 1, 2025	2420	3.55
522	21	"Tough Love"	Martha Mitchell	Teleplay by : Pamela Wechsler & Scott Gold; Story by : Pamela Wechsler & William Lapp	May 8, 2025	2421	3.45
523	22	"Look the Other Way"	Alex Hall	Rick Eid	May 15, 2025	2422	3.67

=== Season 25 (2025–2026) ===
- David Ajala joins the main cast as Detective Theo Walker in the seventh episode, "Guardian".

Law & Order season 25 episodes
No. overall	No. in season	Title	Directed by	Written by	Original release date	Prod. code	U.S. viewers (millions)
524	1	"Street Justice"	Alex Hall	Rick Eid	September 25, 2025	2501	3.59
525	2	"Hindsight"	David Grossman	Scott Gold & Will Lapp	October 2, 2025	2503	3.65
526	3	"White Lies"	Milena Govich	Jennifer Vanderbes	October 9, 2025	2504	3.11
527	4	"Two and Twenty"	Martha Mitchell	Rick Eid	October 16, 2025	2505	3.48
528	5	"Bend the Knee"	Michael Smith	Scott Gold	October 23, 2025	2502	3.45
529	6	"Brotherly Love"	Alex Hall	Rick Eid	October 30, 2025	2506	3.62
530	7	"Guardian"	Carlos Bernard	Teleplay by : Art Alamo & Ajani Jackson; Story by : Ajani Jackson & Jolie Huang	November 13, 2025	2507	3.52
531	8	"Parasite"	Michael Pressman	Jennifer Vanderbes & Jolie Huang	November 20, 2025	2508	3.71
532	9	"Snowflakes (Part 1)"	Jean de Segonzac	Scott Gold	January 8, 2026	2509	3.97
533	10	"Dream On"	Néstor Carbonell	Rick Eid & Tori Nove	January 15, 2026	2510	3.88
534	11	"The Enemy of All Women"	Norberto Barba	Art Alamo	January 22, 2026	2511	4.02
535	12	"Never Say Goodbye"	Fred Berner	Scott Gold & Will Lapp	January 29, 2026	2512	4.15
536	13	"New Normal"	Norberto Barba	Rick Eid & Ajani Jackson	February 26, 2026	2513	3.93
537	14	"Remedies"	Martha Mitchell	Jennifer Vanderbes	March 5, 2026	2514	3.78
538	15	"Bright Lights"	Peter Stebbings	Rick Eid	March 12, 2026	2515	3.50
539	16	"Fate's Cruel Joke"	Alex Hall	Art Alamo	April 2, 2026	2516	3.35
540	17	"Beyond Measure"	Jean de Segonzac	Scott Gold & Will Lapp	April 9, 2026	2517	3.84
541	18	"Ride or Die"	Oscar Lozoya	Jolie Huang & Jennifer Vanderbes	April 23, 2026	2518	3.48
542	19	"Accidentally Like a Martyr"	David Grossman	Rick Eid	April 30, 2026	2519	3.48
543	20	"Once Burned"	Michael Smith	Art Alamo & Ajani Jackson	May 7, 2026	2520	3.51
544	21	"Liberty"	Alex Hall	Rick Eid & Scott Gold	May 14, 2026	2521	3.98

=== Season 26 (2026) ===
- James Badge Dale joins the cast as Detective Rob Calvino, replacing Scott, who exited in the second episode.

Law & Order season 26 episodes
No. overall	No. in season	Title	Directed by	Written by	Original release date	Prod. code
545	1	"Ghost in the Machine"	Alex Hall	Rick Eid & Scott Gold	October 8, 2026	2601
546	2	"Into the Mystic"	Eriq La Salle	Rick Eid	October 15, 2026	2602
547	3	"Bad News"	David Grossman	Art Alamo	October 22, 2026	2603
548	4	"Property"	Carlos Bernard	Jennifer Vanderbes	October 29, 2026	2604
549	5	"Rage Bait"	Milena Govich	Scott Gold & Ajani Jackson	November 5, 2026	2605
550	6	"Do No Harm"	TBA	Art Alamo & Thomas Wong	November 12, 2026	2606
551	7	TBA	TBA	Rick Eid	TBA	2607
552	8	TBA	TBA	Scott Gold & Will Lapp	TBA	2608

== Home video releases ==
Season	Episodes	DVD release dates				Bonus features
Season	Episodes	Region 1	Region 2	Region 4	Discs	Bonus features
1	22	October 15, 2002	June 16, 2003	April 14, 2003	6	"The Creation of Law & Order"; Preview of New Law & Order Interactive Game
2	22	May 4, 2004	February 28, 2004	January 19, 2005	3	Law & Order: The First Three Years
3	22	May 24, 2005	November 21, 2005	March 8, 2006	3	A Tribute to Jerry Orbach; Jerry Orbach Profile; Deleted Scenes
4	22	December 6, 2005	July 17, 2006	September 19, 2006	3	Deleted and Extended Scenes
5	23	April 3, 2007	July 23, 2007	July 30, 2007	5	America's Top Sleuths
6	23	December 2, 2008	February 16, 2009	March 4, 2009	5	Homicide: Life on the Street Crossover Episode "For God and Country"
7	23	January 19, 2010	April 12, 2010	April 21, 2010	5	—N/a
8	24	December 7, 2010	TBA	August 4, 2011	5	Homicide: Life on the Street Crossover Episode "Baby It's You, Part 2"
9	24	December 6, 2011	TBA	August 3, 2016	5	Homicide: Life on the Street Crossover Episode "Sideshow: Part Two"
Film		June 12, 2012	March 21, 2011	TBA	1	—N/a
10	24	February 23, 2012	TBA	August 3, 2016	5	—N/a
11	24	November 6, 2012	TBA	August 3, 2016	5	—N/a
12	24	February 26, 2013	TBA	October 5, 2016	5	—N/a
13	24	November 5, 2013	TBA	October 5, 2016	5	—N/a
14	24	September 14, 2004	TBA	October 5, 2016	6	Profile: Jesse L. Martin; Profile: Fred Dalton Thompson; Set Tour with Jerry Orbach; Interview with Park Dietz; Profiles Teaser
15	24	November 4, 2014	TBA	March 2, 2017	5	—N/a
16	22	November 4, 2014	TBA	March 2, 2017	5	—N/a
17	22	November 4, 2014	TBA	March 2, 2017	5	—N/a
18	18	May 5, 2015	TBA	April 5, 2017	4	—N/a
19	22	May 5, 2015	TBA	April 5, 2017	5	—N/a
20	23	May 5, 2015	TBA	April 5, 2017	5	—N/a
21	10	TBA	TBA	TBA	TBA	—N/a
22	22	TBA	TBA	TBA	TBA	—N/a

== See also ==
- List of Law & Order home video releases
- List of Law & Order: Special Victims Unit episodes
- List of Law & Order: Criminal Intent episodes
- List of Law & Order: Trial by Jury episodes
- List of Law & Order: LA episodes
- List of Law & Order: Organized Crime episodes
