= Law & Order season 9 =

Season of American television series

Law & Order
- Season 9
- Season 9 U.S. DVD cover
- Starring: Jerry Orbach; Benjamin Bratt; S. Epatha Merkerson; Sam Waterston; Angie Harmon; Steven Hill
- No. of episodes: 24

Release
- Original network: NBC
- Original release: September 23, 1998 – May 26, 1999

Season chronology
- ← Previous; Season 8 Next → Season 10

The ninth season of Law & Order premiered in the United States on NBC on September 23, 1998, and ended with a two-part episode on May 26, 1999. It was released on DVD on December 6, 2011. This was the last season of Law & Order to air alone. Its first spinoff, Law & Order: Special Victims Unit, debuted the following fall.

== Cast ==
Abbie Carmichael (played by Angie Harmon) replaced season 8's Jamie Ross (Carey Lowell) in the role of Assistant District Attorney. Benjamin Bratt, who played Rey Curtis, left the series at the end of the 9th season, but made a special guest appearance in the episode "Fed" in the 20th and originally final season (series was revived 12 years later with season 21).

=== Main ===
- Jerry Orbach as Senior Detective Lennie Briscoe
- Benjamin Bratt as Junior Detective Rey Curtis
- S. Epatha Merkerson as Lieutenant Anita Van Buren
- Sam Waterston as Executive Assistant District Attorney Jack McCoy
- Angie Harmon as Assistant District Attorney Abbie Carmichael
- Steven Hill as District Attorney Adam Schiff

=== Recurring ===
- Carolyn McCormick as Dr. Elizabeth Olivet
- J. K. Simmons as Dr. Emil Skoda
- Leslie Hendrix as M.E. Dr. Elizabeth Rodgers
- Larry Clarke as Detective Morris LaMotte

=== Guest ===
- Tovah Feldshuh as Defense Attorney Danielle Melnick
- Richard Belzer as BPD Detective John Munch
- Željko Ivanek as Assistant State's Attorney Ed Danvers
- Michael Michele as BPD Detective Rene Sheppard
- Meg Gibson as Faye Wellington
- Julie Nathanson as Katherine Rainer
- George Hearn as Independent Counsel William Dell
- Julia Roberts as Katrina Ludlow
- Ben Shenkman as Defense Attorney Nick Margolis
- Michael Mulheren as Judge Harrison Taylor
- Aleksander Krupa as Constantin Volsky

== Episodes ==
No. overall	No. in season	Title	Directed by	Written by	Original release date	Prod. code	U.S. viewers (millions)
182	1	"Cherished"	Ed Sherin	S : Carl Nelson & Scott Tobin; S/T : Kathy McCormick	September 30, 1998	E0203	15.56
After a baby girl is found dead, Briscoe and Curtis investigate the family and learn that her adopted family and brother were trying to keep some painful secrets. Jack gets a new partner, Abbie Carmichael, who had a 95% conviction rate in her four years with Special Narcotics. Together, McCoy and Carmichael try to prove that the little girl's brother committed the crime. Cast: First appearance by Angie Harmon as Assistant District Attorney Abbie Carmichael.
183	2	"DWB"	Constantine Makris	René Balcer	October 7, 1998	E0205	13.01
Briscoe and Curtis discover a shocking twist involving unlikely suspects when they investigate the brutal beating of Floyd Michaels, a black man dumped near the highway.
184	3	"Bait"	Lewis H. Gould	S : I.C. Rapoport; S/T : David Shore	October 14, 1998	E0204	11.84
The investigation into how teen Kevin Stanton got wounded leads Briscoe and Curtis to a case involving a young woman's murder and a drug operation. Guest starring: José Zúñiga as Detective Mark Rivera.
185	4	"Flight"	David Platt	Richard Sweren & William N. Fordes	October 28, 1998	E0209	12.22
After Ryan Downing, a child in a day-care center, dies from Vancomycin-resistant Staphylococcus aureus, Briscoe and Curtis try to find the source of the infection, leading to a case involving an extramarital affair, embezzlement, and a drug manufacturer. Guest starring: Dylan Baker as Aaron Downing; Jack Gilpin as Defense Attorney Mr. Axtell.
186	5	"Agony"	Constantine Makris	Kathy McCormick	November 4, 1998	E0216	15.62
After Detectives Briscoe and Curtis find a murdered postman and Kitty Lansing, a woman who was left for dead in her apartment, the investigation leads to a serial killer and a surprise. Guest starring: Mark Blum as Defense Attorney Frank Lazar. Note: Clips from this episode are shown during an episode of Friends.
–	–	Exiled: A Law & Order Movie	Jean de Segonzac	S : Chris Noth; S/T : Charles Kipps	November 8, 1998	E0201	17.86
Three years after being reassigned to Staten Island for punching a corrupt politician, Mike Logan gets a chance to redeem himself when he takes on a murder case that leads him back to the 27th Precinct. Cast: John Fiore's last appearance as Detective Tony Profaci.
187	6	"Scrambled"	Martha Mitchell	S : Judith Hooper & Dick Teresi; T : Ed Zuckerman	November 11, 1998	E0208	13.78
The murder of Sarah Purcell, an employee at a fertility clinic, leads Briscoe and Curtis to a case involving a dead man's first and second wives.
188	7	"Venom"	Jace Alexander	S : David Shore; S/T : I.C. Rapoport	November 18, 1998	E0206	15.91
The killing of Stuart Whitman, a professional escort, leads Briscoe and Curtis to a case involving the relationships between a young man and two older women. Note: Based on the Sante and Kenny Kimes case.
189	8	"Punk"	Matthew Penn	S : Richard Sweren; S/T : Matt Witten	November 25, 1998	E0215	13.43
The murder of Charles Tyner, a corrections officer, leads detectives to a women's prison where a guard was linked to an inmate, Alice, a college student Carmichael put in prison for not knowing the full name of a passing acquaintance who left an ounce of cocaine in her car; current defense attorney Danielle Melnick, and even Lt Van Buren, are stunned about how harsh Carmichael was. Briscoe and Curtis arrest a friend of Alice on suspicion after the murder weapon is found in his car, but Alice refuses to divulge what she knows. Carmichael continues to rant, surprising McCoy, about how Alice is simply a useless criminal. She manages to break Alice’s resolve, and she admits her friend killed Tyner – because Tyner repeatedly prison raped her, got her pregnant, and approached her daughter with threats. Guest starring: James Colby, Cara Buono, Karina Arroyave.
190	9	"True North"	Arthur W. Forney	Ed Zuckerman	December 9, 1998	E0207	13.49
The double murder of wealthy businessman Ronald Harker and his young daughter leads the detectives to Stephanie Harker, the wife and stepmother of the deceased, after she apparently kills her husband’s alleged mistress in self-defense. When it comes to light that Ronald was considering divorce and also had suspicions surrounding the hit-and-run death of his first wife two years prior, Stephanie finds herself on trial for triple murder. However, Canada's objection to the death penalty hampers McCoy and Carmichael in seeking crucial evidence for obtaining a conviction. McCoy manages to break Stephanie on the stand, and she confesses, begging for a second chance, but the jury refuses and she is sentenced to death. Guest starring: John Doman as Mr. Stephens, and Bellamy Young as Stephanie Harker.
191	10	"Hate"	Constantine Makris	René Balcer	January 6, 1999	E0214	16.38
Evidence points Briscoe and Curtis in the direction of a white supremacist youth gathering after the brutal beating and murder of Christina Osborne, a high school girl. Guest starring: Michael Cumpsty, Paul Dawson, Joshua Harto. Note: This episode was dedicated to Charles E. Rose, former Assistant United States Attorney for the Eastern District of New York, with the epitaph "He made the world a safer place".
192	11	"Ramparts"	Matthew Penn	Kathy McCormick & Lynne Litt	January 13, 1999	E0211	16.62
Briscoe and Curtis reopen a 30-year-old missing persons case when a vehicle dredged from the Hudson River is revealed to contain the remains of David Bernstein, a man who was involved in student protests.
193	12	"Haven"	David Platt	David Shore & I.C. Rapoport	January 27, 1999	E0219	13.55
Briscoe and Curtis probe the murder of Randall Chase, a former street punk turned popular Harlem community leader, while McCoy and Carmichael struggle to prevent a chaotic situation involving affirmative action. A college student whom Chase mentored is arrested for the murder after his alibi is invalidated, and originally claims a gangbanger was the true culprit. When this new suspect is proven innocent, the student later admits to killing Chase in a fit of anger after Chase caught him cheating on his exams, and is sentenced to 6 to 12 years for aggravated manslaughter. Guest starring: Ruben Santiago-Hudson as Defense Attorney Winters.
194	13	"Hunters"	Richard Dobbs	S : William N. Fordes; S/T : Gerry Conway	February 3, 1999	E0218	15.29
Briscoe and Curtis clash with two bounty hunters in pursuit of a fugitive who is also suspected of killing his brother-in-law. The manhunt turns into a competition, which ends when the hunters end up in a shootout with the victim at his sister’s apartment and critically wound him, while his sister and her nanny are killed in the crossfire. Carmichael does not buy the hunters’ story of self-defense, doubting the fugitive fired any shots at all, and soon suspects that the bounty office was intending to kill the fugitive, and the brother-in-law was killed by the hunters for refusing to disclose the fugitive’s location. She successfully indicts them, but because the fugitive’s wounds have left him unable to testify, the hunters are cleared of the brother-in-law’s murder and the other charges are dismissed.
195	14	"Sideshow"	Ed Sherin	René Balcer	February 10, 1999	E0210	15.63
When Briscoe and Curtis discover that a high-level federal official found murdered in Battery Park was recently transferred from Baltimore, they team up with Baltimore homicide detectives. The joint investigation reveals that the victim was involved in an affair with another high-level government official, whose career will be destroyed if the relationship becomes public. The Independent Counsel summons McCoy and his Baltimore counterpart, Ed Danvers, to Washington and demands that McCoy reveal his source or be jailed for contempt. Briscoe and Curtis apprehend the suspect, but the FBI claims jurisdiction and the suspect evades trial, if not justice. Note: This episode begins a crossover event that concludes on Homicide: Life on the Street season 7 episode 15 "Sideshow". It is last Law & Order and Homicide crossover. Guest starring: Richard Belzer as John Munch, Željko Ivanek as A.S.A. Ed Danvers, and Michael Michele as Rene Sheppard.
196	15	"Disciple"	Martha Mitchell	S : Kathy McCormick; T : Richard Sweren; S/T : Lynne Litt	February 17, 1999	E0220	13.55
After teen Keira Grayson is found dead in the emergency room, Briscoe and Curtis' investigation leads to a case involving a religious ritual and a defendant who claims that the action taken was dictated by a saint's voice. Guest starring: Leighton Meester, Sylva Kelegian, Frances Conroy, Wendell Pierce.
197	16	"Harm"	Richard Dobbs	René Balcer & Eddie Feldmann	February 24, 1999	E0213	12.93
When Briscoe and Curtis probe the assault of retired divorce attorney Ken Slattery, who may have been bought off by a successful doctor, Carmichael digs deeper and uncovers a possible case of homicide in the operating room by the doctor's practice partners. Guest starring: Stephen Bogardus, Sam Freed, Maria Tucci, Michael Gaston, Ron McLarty.
198	17	"Shield"	Stephen Wertimer	T : René Balcer; S/T : David Shore & I.C. Rapoport	March 24, 1999	E0202	15.24
Briscoe and Curtis investigate the murder of Detective Daniel Pelham, who was shot while on an undercover stakeout. When it comes to light that the victim and his girlfriend, Officer Marissa Hastings, had several violent arguments, she is arrested. Subsequent investigation reveals Pelham was extremely abusive towards Marissa, which only strengthens the prosecution’s case against her, but after hearing Marissa’s testimony in court, Dr. Skoda doubts her guilt, and Carmichael discovers an inconsistency, leading to the discovery that Marissa’s partner killed Pelham to protect her. Marissa is acquitted, while her partner receives 15 to life for second-degree murder. Guest starring: Holt McCallany, Skipp Sudduth, Ellen McLaughlin, Philip Bosco, George Murdock.
199	18	"Juvenile"	Lewis H. Gould	Richard Sweren & Lynne Litt	March 31, 1999	E0223	14.87
The investigation into the non-fatal shooting of newspaper columnist Gerald Fox leads to a murder case from the 1970s, where a promiscuous actress fell from her balcony and her boyfriend was convicted. Fox apparently found proof that acquitted the boyfriend and implicated the victim’s son and daughter (played by actual husband and wife Matthew Bennett and Marsha Dietlein), who at the time had been juveniles. When evidence indicates the daughter killed the actress and the son shot Fox to try and protect her, both are arrested. McCoy discovers that the daughter killed the actress to have the boyfriend to herself. The daughter is indicted for both her mother’s murder and the assault on Fox. Note: Pre-end credits text states the son was serving his sentence at Clinton Correctional Facility and the daughter was acquitted for the shooting of Fox. The last time these cards were used was the season 7 episode "Barter" and the season 1 episode "The Violence of Summer". Guest starring: Elaine Bromka as Senior A.D.A. Arlene Wolensky; Frank Vincent as John Franchetta; Bob Dishy as Defense Attorney Lawrence "Larry" Weaver.
200	19	"Tabula Rasa"	Richard Dobbs	Kathy McCormick & William N. Fordes	April 21, 1999	E0222	16.45
After philosophy professor Marion Hollis is pushed in front of a subway train and killed, the investigation leads Briscoe and Curtis to a suspect who, following a divorce, changed his identity and disappeared with his daughters. Guest starring: Jay O. Sanders as Bill Fallon / Nick Traska.
201	20	"Empire"	Matthew Penn	S : René Balcer; S/T : Robert Palm	April 28, 1999	E0217	18.40
The death of womanizing corporate mogul Gilbert Sanderson, caused by an overdose of a sexual performance-enhancing drug leads to a case with a witness that puts Curtis in a compromising position as they try to build a case against a rival CEO. This leads to the prosecution calling Curtis’s character into question, but he stands firm and successfully rebuffs the allegations, and Sanderson’s rival is convicted of murder. Guest starring: Julia Roberts (Note: Roberts, who was just weeks away from filming her Oscar-winning role in Erin Brockovich, was in a long-standing relationship with series regular Benjamin Bratt at the time of this episode.) as Katrina Ludlow.
202	21	"Ambitious"	Christopher Misiano	S : Richard Sweren; S/T : Barry M. Schkolnick	May 5, 1999	E0221	15.06
The murder of Donny Gibson, an audio installation salesman, leads the detectives to a case with connections to the Italian mafia. When the murder is linked to both the son of an Italian mob boss and the co-owners of a strip club, shady business and blackmail soon come to light. The son is charged with murder and McCoy promises the partners protection after they agree to testify, but after the son’s attorney exposes the bad business, he is forced to go back on his word and send them to prison, which could possibly endanger their lives. Guest starring: Joe Piscopo as Jeff Stahl; Mark Linn-Baker as Tom Wilder.
203	22	"Admissions"	Jace Alexander	S : William N. Fordes; T : Kathy McCormick; S/T : Lynne E. Litt	May 12, 1999	E0224	14.96
A coed's killing leads to a case involving the deceased's relationship with a professor and two male students who vouch for each other's whereabouts on the night of the murder. Guest starring: Miguel Sandoval as Dr. Miguel Clemente.
204	23	"Refuge"	Constantine Makris	René Balcer	May 19, 1999	E0212	16.31
205	24	"Refuge"	Constantine Makris	René Balcer	May 19, 1999	E0225	19.29
Part I: A crime scene where both the victim and perpetrator are found dead leads detectives and attorneys to a speechless 10-year-old witness – and into a dangerous web that involves the ruthless Russian mafia. Part II: After an ADA and a witness' mother are murdered, with the young witness barely surviving, McCoy must connect defendants who are part of the Russian mob with a money-laundering operation before vital evidence is destroyed - and any more witnesses are found dead. Meanwhile, Detective Rey Curtis leaves the 27th Precinct to take care of his wife who suffers from MS. Cast: Final regular appearance of Benjamin Bratt. Guest starring: Jenna Stern as A.D.A. Toni Ricci; Tom Mason as Carlton Radford.
