= Steel-Eyed Death =

13th episode of the 20th season of Law & Order

- Law & Order episode
- Episode no.: Season 20; Episode 13
- Directed by: Michael Pressman
- Written by: Christopher Ambrose; Julie Martin; Richard Sweren
- Production code: 1. 20013
- Original air date: March 1, 2010

Guest appearances
- Emily Meade as Bonnie Jones/Amanda Evans; Michael Oberholtzer as Justin Sachs; Kevin O'Rourke as Amanda's Attorney; Finnerty Steeves as Darlene Evans; Karen Young as Mrs. Sachs; Rebecca Creskoff as Veronica Masters; Fred Melamed as Judge Bertram Hill; Special Guest Star: J. K. Simmons as Dr. Emil Skoda

Episode chronology
← Previous "Blackmail"	Next → "Boy on Fire"

"Steel-Eyed Death" is the thirteenth episode of the twentieth season of NBC's long-running legal drama Law & Order.

== Plot ==
A family of four is found murdered in their home. One of the killers is a boy experiencing symptoms of a type of post-traumatic stress disorder.

In this episode, Detective Lupo admits he had PTSD and a drinking problem after seeing a horrible crime scene on a past Christmas.

== Production ==
"Steel-Eyed Death" was directed by Michael Pressman and written by Christopher Ambrose, Julie Martin, and Richard Sweren.

== Cultural references ==
Music by Australian horrorcore rap artist KidCrusher is featured in the episode, including the songs "Killin' Shit" and "A Dirty Fuckin' Murder". The artist said he was told the episode was based on a horrorcore festival when he allowed his music to be featured in "Steel-Eyed Death". Upon learning the episode depicted Juggalos, he later claimed to be angry that his music was used. He said, "I am pretty pissed off to hear they based the episode on Juggalos and try to make us all look like criminals and real serial killers, and that we would kill kids."

This episode is partially inspired by the Richard Alden Samuel McCroskey III case. McCroskey, an amateur horrorcore rapper who was heavily inspired by horrorcore rap artist Mars and went by the name "Syko Sam", was accused of murdering four people in Farmville, Virginia. The victims were a Presbyterian pastor, his estranged wife, their teenage daughter (who had been dating McCroskey), and one of their daughter's friends.

== Reception ==
"Steel-Eyed Death" drew criticism from Juggalos and fans of horrorcore hip hop music, who felt the episode unfairly equated the music genre and its fans with violent crime and murder.

In its original American broadcast on March 1, 2010, "Steel-Eyed Death" was watched by 7.58 million average households over the hour, and received 1.9/5 aged between 18 and 49, according to Nielsen ratings. The episode had outperformed Life Unexpected on The CW, which drew only 1.88 million households. "Steel-Eyed Death" had 0.98 million viewers less than the episode of 24 that aired on Fox that night which drew 8.56 million viewers.
