= Rubber Room (Law & Order) =

23rd episode of the 20th season of Law & Order

- Law & Order episode
- Episode no.: Season 20; Episode 23
- Directed by: René Balcer
- Written by: René Balcer
- Production code: 20023
- Original air date: May 24, 2010

Guest appearances
- Angela Goethals as Maura Scott; Paul Schulze as Mr. Kralik; John Speredakos as A.U.S.A. Schlicter; Leslie Hendrix as Dr. Elizabeth Rodgers; Deidre O'Connell as Dr. Valerie Knight; J. K. Simmons as Dr. Emil Skoda; Ernie Hudson as Frank Gibson; Lindsey Vonn as Alicia; James Biberi as Chief of Detectives Laird; Andrew Pastides as Rick Benson; Nadia Alexander as Morgan; Conor Leslie as Eliza; Patrick Murney as Dwayne Phillips

Episode chronology
← Previous "Love Eternal"	Next → "The Right Thing"
- Law & Order season 20

"Rubber Room" is the season finale of the twentieth season of American legal drama television series Law & Order. The twenty-third episode of the season and the 456th episode overall, the episode was first broadcast on NBC on May 24, 2010, and originally served as the series finale, until the series was later revived in 2021. In the episode, Detectives Lupo and Bernard search for an anonymous blogger who has posted plans to attack a school, while Lt. Van Buren struggles to keep her personal issues private. The title refers to a colloquial name for reassignment centers where teachers accused of misconduct are held while awaiting resolution of their cases. The elements of the plot were inspired by an ongoing controversy surrounding New York City's policy and union rules for teachers in early 2010.

The episode was written and directed by René Balcer and received positive reviews from critics and a 1.9 rating in the 18-49 demographic in its original American broadcast.

== Plot ==
A website hosting explicit images of underage girls leads the detectives to discovering an anonymous blogger threatening a bombing and shooting at an unidentified school. The detectives suspect that the blogger is a student and investigate teachers whom the blogger aired grievances against while facing resistance from the New York City Department of Education (NYCDOE) and the teachers' union. The investigation leads the team to the "rubber room," a temporary reassignment center where teachers accused of misconduct are to report to until their cases are resolved. Noting that the teachers targeted in the blog did not share any students, the investigators realize that the blogger is a teacher himself, recounting the stories he was told while he was held in the rubber room. They also recognize that the planned attack on the school is intended as retaliation against the NYCDOE.

The team finds one teacher mentioned on the blog, Maura Scott, who was not sent to the rubber room, and deduce that she was a co-worker of the blogger. Scott identifies the blogger as Rick Benson, who was falsely accused of molesting a student. Now knowing the blogger and the school he plans to attack, Lupo and Bernard rush to stop him. They arrive at the school just as Benson has initiated the shooting, but before anyone has been killed. Finding the shooter in the school's library, Lupo manages to distract Benson long enough for Bernard to restrain and arrest him.

In a subplot centered around Van Buren's cervical cancer, Lupo and Bernard host a party to help pay her medical bills, despite her wishes to keep her personal issues from becoming public. Nevertheless, Van Buren attends the party and reveals that she and Frank Gibson have become engaged. During the party, Van Buren receives a phone call from her doctor and reacts positively, implying that she received good news about her illness.

== Reception ==
In its original American broadcast, "Rubber Room" was viewed by an estimated 7.60 million households with a 1.9 rating/5% share in the 18-49 demographic.

Mike Hale of The New York Times called it "the best finale of all", saying, "There was the show that ended with its cast in the buffet line for heaven, and the show that ended with its homicidal hero on his way to retirement at the beach. And then there was the best finale of all: the show that ended with a very sick police lieutenant excusing herself to take a phone call and getting good news. The last episode of Law & Order written and directed by the show’s longtime executive producer René Balcer, was finished before the series’s cancellation was announced this month. Yet it managed to be an entirely appropriate send-off, and its low-key last moments were more moving and honestly emotional than the endings of Lost and 24, shows whose finales received much more attention."

Ken Tucker of Entertainment Weekly gave the episode a positive review, saying "That’s why Law & Order in eternal reruns is so comforting. You can enjoy episodes even when you remember the case or the outcome, because you want to immerse yourself in that Law & Order feeling that didn’t insult your intelligence."
