= Blackmail (Law & Order) =

12th episode of the 20th season of Law & Order

- Law & Order episode
- Episode no.: Season 20; Episode 12
- Directed by: Marc Levin
- Written by: Ed Zuckerman; Matthew McGough
- Production code: 1. 20012
- Original air date: January 15, 2010

Guest appearances
- Samantha Bee as Vanessa Carville; Raúl Esparza as Dennis Di Palma

Episode chronology
← Previous "Fed"	Next → "Steel-Eyed Death"

"Blackmail" is the twelfth episode of the twentieth season of the television series Law & Order. It aired on NBC January 15, 2010.

== Plot ==
When Detectives Lupo and Bernard find journalist Megan Kerik dead on an abandoned construction site, the detectives learn of a relationship between the victim and daytime talk show host Vanessa Carville (Samantha Bee). Upon further investigation, the detectives encounter Carville in a meeting with DA Jack McCoy, and Carville admits to a series of workplace affairs with other women and a blackmail threat leaving the detectives suspicious of Carville and her co-workers.

The investigation has to explore whether it was Carville who killed Megan, or the would-be blackmailer who they need Carville's help to expose: the team end up pursuing a knife-edge legal strategy to uncover the truth.

== Production ==
"Blackmail" was written by Ed Zuckerman and Matthew McGough, and directed by Marc Levin. The episode was based on a real-life scandal involving late night talk show host David Letterman. In October 2009, Letterman announced on the Late Show with David Letterman that someone was attempting to blackmail him by threatening to reveal evidence of a sexual relationship Letterman was having with a female employee. Samantha Bee, a correspondent on the Comedy Central television series The Daily Show, guest starred as Vanessa Carville, a celebrity talk show host who becomes the victim of extortion.

Many elements of "Blackmail" are inspired directly from the Letterman scandal. Like Letterman, Carville finds an envelope with an extortion demand on her way to work. Both Letterman and Carville decided to go public with the information rather than pay the blackmail, and both made on-screen confessions about their affairs during a broadcast of their talk show. There were also differences between the real and fictional scandals, the most major of which that no reporter is murdered in the real scandal, and that Letterman did not help the police catch the blackmailer during a sting operation. Additionally, Letterman's blackmailer demanded $2 million, whereas in "Blackmail", the extortion amount is $3 million.

== Cultural references ==
Vanessa Carville's talk show combines elements of the Late Show with David Letterman and The View, an ABC Daytime talk show features several female hosts. In "Blackmail", Carville is slandered on a website called "CitySmear", which is modeled after real-life blogs Gawker and TMZ.com.

== Reception ==
In its original American broadcast on January 15, 2010, "Blackmail" was watched by 7.34 million average households over the hour, among viewers aged between 18 and 49, according to Nielsen ratings. The show drew about 7.15 million households in that age group during the first half-hour, and about 7.5 million households during the second half-hour. The episode outperformed Supernanny on ABC, which drew an overage 5.39 million households, but had less viewers than Ghost Whisperer on CBS, which drew 8.63 million households. "Blackmail" also drew more viewers than repeats of Bones on Fox, which drew 3.89 million households, and Smallville on The CW, which drew 1.19 million households.

Letterman and his staff declined to comment on "Blackmail", but Letterman made a joke about the Law & Order franchise during his show on January 12, 2010. The episode aired the week that Jay Leno and Conan O'Brien were involved in a public battle over who would host the NBC late night talk show, The Tonight Show. Letterman, who was previously passed over for The Tonight Show in favor of Leno, said NBC was developing a new show called Law & Order: Leno Victims Unit. A voiceover for the fictional show said, "There are two types of talk show hosts. Jay Leno, and those who have been victimized by Jay Leno. These are their stories."
