= Fed (Law & Order) =

11th episode of the 20th season of Law & Order

- Law & Order episode
- Episode no.: Season 20; Episode 11
- Directed by: Alex Chapple
- Written by: Keith Eisner; & René Balcer
- Production code: 1. 20011
- Original air date: December 11, 2009

Guest appearances
- Boris McGiver as Jerry Gans; Danai Gurira as Courtney Owens; Ramon Fernandez as Arturo Ramirez; Sam Robards as Davis Webb; Ernie Hudson as Frank; Leslie Hendrix as Elizabeth Rodgers; Benjamin Bratt as Detective Curtis

Episode chronology
← Previous "Shotgun"	Next → "Blackmail"

"Fed" is the eleventh episode of the twentieth season of NBC's long-running legal drama Law & Order.

== Plot ==
As election day rapidly approaches, Detectives Lupo and Bernard discover the disfigured remains of a man with the word "FED" written across his bare chest. Missing a crucial piece of evidence, the detectives decide to retrace the steps of the victim, who is a campaign volunteer. After the victim's perplexing past emerges and the list of suspects multiplies, the detectives find themselves dealing with more than just dirty politics.

Former detective Rey Curtis, having recently lost his wife Deborah, has come back to Long Island with his three daughters to bury her beside her parents. Lt. Van Buren receives a call from Curtis inviting her to the funeral. Ill with cancer herself, she was able to make it to the funeral despite her busy schedule. Curtis, who heard about Van Buren's illness from the police grapevine, commented gravely about her cancer as "just rotten luck all around". He described Deborah's lost battle with multiple sclerosis, how she faced death bravely but was overwhelmed by it in the end. Curtis also tells Van Buren that Deborah died at home in his arms and revealed that he had called his old partner, Lennie Briscoe, just before he died, and Lennie had still been his old wise-cracking self. By the end of the episode, Lt. Van Buren is doubtful of her own survival.

== Reception ==
On its original American broadcast on December 11, 2009, "Fed" was watched by 8.77 million average households over the hour, among viewers aged between 18 and 49, according to Nielsen ratings. The episode had outperformed Yes, Virginia on CBS, which drew only 5.27 million households as well as a repeat of an episode of The Big Bang Theory also on CBS which drew only 4.55 million households. Also outperforming Supernanny on ABC with only 4.63 million households, Dollhouse on Fox with only 2.72 million households and a repeat episode of Smallville on The CW with only 1.36 million households making Law & Order the highest-rated scripted drama series of the night only to be surpassed by Dateline NBC which pulled 9.27 million households.
