= René Balcer =

Screenwriter, producer and director

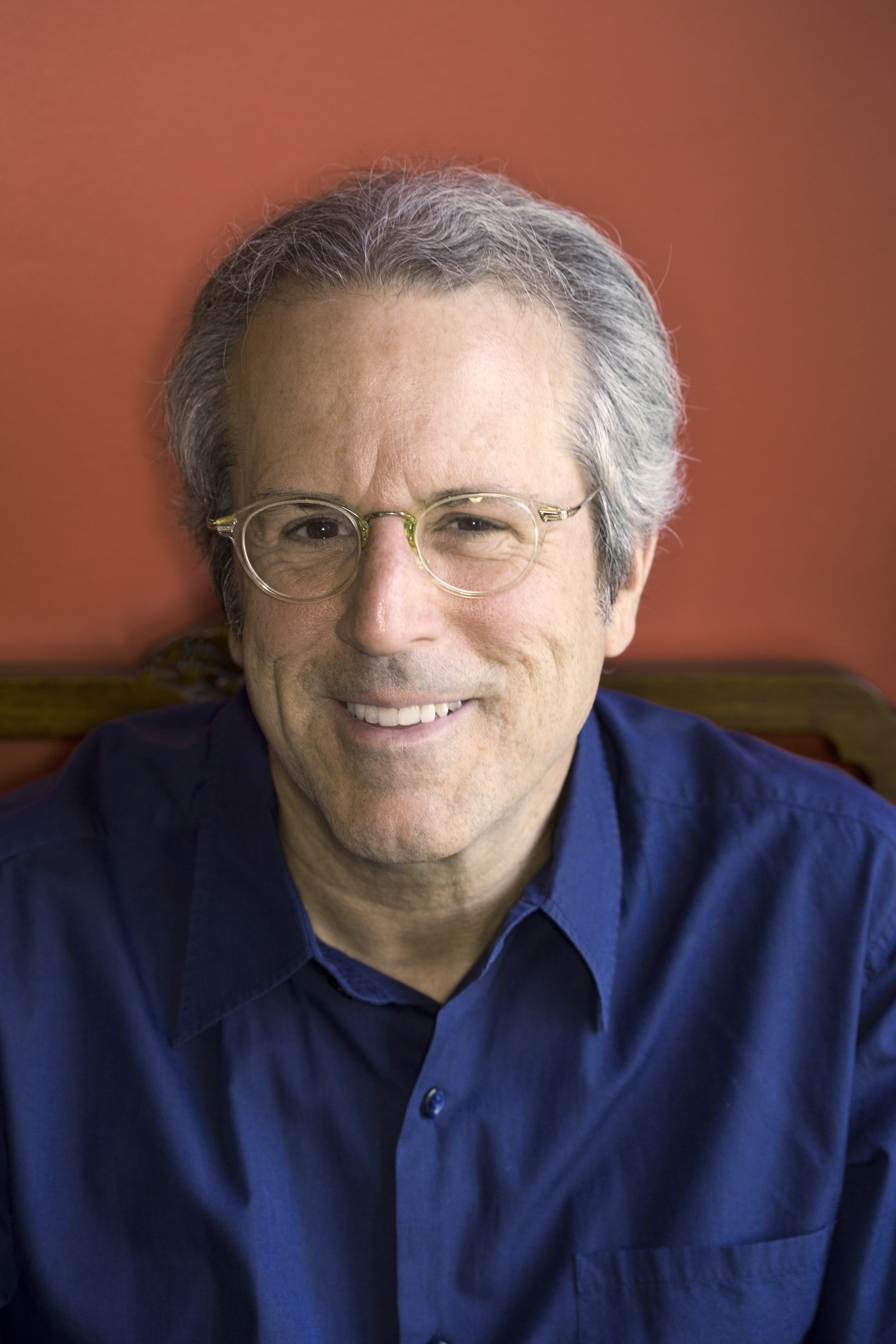
- René Balcer
- Born: February 9, 1954 (age 72); Montreal, Quebec, Canada
- Occupations: Writer, producer, director, showrunner, photographer

René Balcer (born February 9, 1954) is a Canadian-American television writer, director, producer, and showrunner, as well as a photographer and documentary film-maker.

== Early life ==
He was born in Montreal, Quebec, and attended Lower Canada College in Montreal. He studied creative writing at Concordia University under noted Canadian poet Deborah Eibel, and earned his BA magna cum laude in Communication Studies from Concordia in 1978. While a student, he took a six-month lecture-seminar with Jean-Luc Godard and worked as director John Huston's personal assistant during the filming of Angela. He began his media career covering the 1973 Yom Kippur War as a cameraman. He later worked as a reporter, editor and film critic for various Canadian publications including Cinema Canada, and made documentary films at the National Film Board of Canada. In 1980, he moved to Los Angeles, where he collaborated with cult film director Monte Hellman on a number of film projects. He later wrote screenplays for a variety of film producers including Francis Coppola, Lawrence Gordon, Steve Tisch, Michael Gruskoff, Martin Poll and Mace Neufeld. In 1988, he helped adapt Miguel Piñero's play Midnight Moon at the Greasy Spoon for KCRW radio, starring Ed Asner and Peter Falk. In 1989 he wrote his first television project, the movie of the week Out on the Edge which won the American Psychological Association Award of Excellence. This led to writing assignments on other movies of the week and for the series Star Trek: The Next Generation, Capital News, Veronica Clare and Nasty Boys.

== Career ==
Balcer is noted for writing and showrunning the television series Law & Order, and for creating and showrunning its spin-off series Law & Order: Criminal Intent. He was hired as staff writer on Law & Order's first season in 1990, becoming showrunner in the show's seventh season in 1996. During his tenure as showrunner, Law & Order won the Emmy for Outstanding Drama Series; became a Top Ten drama in the Nielsen ratings; was syndicated to TNT Network in a deal which at the time was the most expensive off-network series sale ever to cable; received an unprecedented five-season pick-up from NBC; and tied Gunsmoke for longest-running TV drama.

Balcer won an Emmy in 1997 as Showrunner and Executive Producer of Law & Order. He has also won a Peabody Award, a Writers Guild of America Award, four Edgar Awards from the Mystery Writers of America (three for his writing for Law & Order, and a fourth for Law & Order: Criminal Intent), a Career Award from the Reims International Television Festival, and a Career Angie Award from the International Mystery Writers Festival.

In writing about legal issues, Balcer has drawn on his own experiences with law enforcement and his first-hand encounter with the brutal application of authoritarian power - at age 16, he was picked up as a suspected FLQ sympathizer during Quebec's October Crisis in 1970 and held overnight in the Montreal Police's infamous Station 10 where he was interrogated and beaten, before being released the next day. That experience, he says, gave him a harsh introduction to the reality lived by many disadvantaged communities.

His work has been recognized outside the entertainment community: in 1999 and 2000, he received the Silver Gavel Award from the American Bar Association for his Law & Order episodes "DWB" and "Hate"; in 2004, he received a Margaret Sanger Award from Planned Parenthood for his Law & Order: Criminal Intent episode "The Third Horseman"; in 2010, he received the Champion of Justice award from the Washington-based Alliance for Justice, for his work on the Law & Order episode "Memo from the Dark Side". In 2004, he was awarded the Alumnus of the Year from Concordia University. On November 17, 2008, he received an honorary Doctorate of Laws (LLD) from Concordia at their fall convocation and delivered the Commencement Address.

Balcer has received additional recognitions, including being commissioned a Kentucky Colonel by Kentucky Governor Steve Beshear in 2008; in the Season Five episode of The Sopranos, "In Camelot", Chris's writing friend JT (played by Tim Daly) tells Chris that he has a meeting with René Balcer about a writing job. Balcer's altercation with a Fox employee during the Writers Guild strike on January 10, 2008 became the subject of a joke by David Letterman during his monologue on January 12, 2008. At the North Dakota Museum of Art, Balcer's Law & Order episodes are played in a continuous loop in the installation Barton Benes Period Room: 21st Century Artist Studio.

In October 2009, Balcer came under attack by right-wing bloggers for an episode of Law & Order about the Bush Administration's Enhanced Interrogation policy. Writing in Breitbart, former Law & Order star Michael Moriarty accused Balcer of being a "Marxist agent provocateur." Balcer said of the attacks, "What many of these critics fail to realize is that Law & Order has always been an equal-opportunity offender, and if a Democratic administration had implemented this despicable (torture) policy, our show would have taken them to task for it."

Balcer was showrunner for Law & Order: Criminal Intent through the fifth season. In March 2007, Balcer returned to Law & Order at the end of its 17th season as executive producer and head writer. He continued on as showrunner through the show's 20th and final season, writing and directing the show's series finale "Rubber Room", which the New York Times called the "best finale of all" that season's TV series. In June 2010, he was hired as showrunner of the Law & Order spinoff, Law & Order: Los Angeles. LOLA, as it was called, was cancelled after one season, with Balcer again writing and directing the series finale. Balcer then rewrote the series finale of Law & Order Criminal Intent, bringing to a close his long association with the Law & Order franchise.

In 2012, Balcer created the series Jo, an English-language cop drama set in Paris and starring Jean Reno, Wunmi Mosaku and Celyn Jones. Shot in Paris, the eight-episode series premiered internationally in January 2013. Jo was ranked fourth in a listing of the Top 30 Best French Detective Series. In 2013, he served as showrunner and executive producer of the CBS pilot, The Ordained, with Charlie Cox.

In 2013, Balcer made two short videos: Watching Tea Leaves in Shanxi, was shot in China and is a zen meditation on the dynamics of tea leaves in fluid, the video is available on Vimeo and YouTube; the other, Blue Sky, was shot in Nice, France and is an "unhinged zen piece" featuring the music of Chinese contemporary composer Huang Ruo, the video is available on Vimeo and YouTube.

In 2015, Balcer wrote and produced For Justice, a pilot for CBS directed by Ava DuVernay, and developed a series about the porn world in the early 1980s with Owen Wilson for the Starz channel entitled WonderWorld. In 2016, the CBC and NBC green lighted Balcer's environmental thriller The Council set in the Canadian Arctic.

In 2017, Balcer co-directed, co-wrote and produced the documentary Above the Drowning Sea, narrated by Julianna Margulies and Tony Goldwyn. The documentary tells the epic story of thousands of Austrian Jewish refugees who escaped the Holocaust and found refuge in Shanghai. The film was an Official Selection at 31 international film festivals, winning the Golden Dragon Award for Best Documentary at the Ferrara Film Festival along with other awards and nominations at other festivals.

In the summer of 2017, Balcer wrote and produced the limited series Law & Order True Crime: The Menendez Murders, a kaleidoscopic take on the notorious 1989 murders of Beverly Hills socialites by their sons. Created by Balcer, the series stars Edie Falco, Heather Graham, Josh Charles, Elizabeth Reaser and Anthony Edwards. The eight-episode series aired in the Fall of 2017 on NBC.

In 2019, Balcer created FBI: Most Wanted. The series stars Julian McMahon, Kellan Lutz, Keisha Castle-Hughes, Roxy Sternberg and Nathaniel Arcand, and premiered on CBS on January 7, 2020. It was that season's highest-rated new drama. FBI: Most Wanted was renewed for a sixth season on April 9, 2024.

Balcer has served on the jury for Best Drama Series at the 2013 Monte-Carlo Television Festival, and on the jury for Best Television Miniseries or Film at the 2014 Shanghai Television Festival.

During his early days in Hollywood, Balcer was an usher at the Sunset Strip's Tiffany Theater in 1981 for its famous midnight and 2 am screenings of the cult classic Rocky Horror Picture Show.

Balcer is a distant cousin of actress Alana de la Garza, sharing a common relative Juan Cortina, a Mexican folk hero known as the Rio Grande Robin Hood.

== Other activities ==
In November 2023, René Balcer: Seeing As, a monograph of Balcer's street and landscape photography, was published by ACC Art Books (UK). Writing in the book's introduction, art historian Robert Hobbs wrote, "Balcer’s most distinctive images participate in the grand historical and metaphorical tradition that joins photography with detective work; the flâneur’s openness to a changing world with urban crimes; and 'seeing as' with eminently metaphoric meanings. Balcer’s type of forensic aesthetic resonances with photography’s history, with Barthes’ assessment of its noeme, and with our preponderantly surveillant society in which even an innocent trip to a cash machine can conceivably be viewed as a potential crime setting, making this aesthetic both ubiquitous in our time and especially relevant to it." Balcer's photo work has appeared in Cinema Canada, Montreal Star, and in Impressions: the Journal of the Japanese Art Society of America Vol. 32.

On June 20, 2024, Balcer's first solo photography show in New York City opened at the Hutchinson Modern & Contemporary Gallery. The show, René Balcer: Forensics, focused on his photography work in Argentina - "In Forensics, Balcer’s photos speak to the complicity of silence during the years of modern-day caudillos in Latin America and to society’s willful blindness in the face of today’s rising authoritarianism in the Americas. In making these images, Balcer was moved by his own experiences during Québec’s 1970 October Crisis in his native Montréal."

This was followed by Hidden Stories at Alisan Fine Arts Gallery in New York in November/December 2024; the show focused on Balcer's photos of Inuit communities in Canada's Eastern Arctic, referencing the Inuit's history of forced relocations and other encounters with settler culture.

In November, 2025, Balcer's 2009 Desaparecidos was permanently installed in the headquarters of the Americas Society/Council of the Americas in New York City. The work consists of 44 images of porteros electricos or electric doormen standing guard at the entrance of exclusive apartment buildings in the Recoleta neighborhood of Buenos Aires, and is a reflection on class and conscience during Argentina's Dirty War.

Writing in the online art magazine Hyperallergic, the art critic John Yau wrote of Balcer's work, "His aesthetic is melded to a sense of social justice, which is a constant in all his activities...It is this invitation to investigate what we are looking at and what it suggests about the broader world that distinguishes his photographs from other street photographers, both his modernist forebears and contemporaries...This suspended state, where we do not know what awaits us, recurs in many of Balcer’s photographs — as well as reverberates in our deeply uncertain times."

On December 19, 2025, Gazing Into the Mirror, a retrospective of Balcer's photography practice to date and his first solo exhibition in China, opened at the Dimension Art Museum in Ningbo, China. In March 2026, the exhibition traveled to Chengdu's famed Contemporary Image Museum and then to the Aurora Art Museum in Shanghai in September 2026.

In the summer of 2011, Balcer collaborated with Chinese artist Xu Bing on an artwork that was part of Xu Bing's exhibition Tobacco Project Virginia at the Virginia Museum of Fine Arts in September of that year. The Washington Post named Tobacco Project Virginia one of the Top Ten art exhibitions of 2011. Balcer's contribution—a poem entitled Backbone using Virginia tobacco plantation brand names as a tribute to the enslaved black women who picked the tobacco—was integrated by Xu Bing into an installation. The work is now part of the VMFA's permanent collection.

Balcer later turned the poem into a blues song, Backbone (Mattawin Music), featuring the blues artists Captain Luke on vocals and Big Ron Hunter on guitar and produced by Michael Sackler-Berner. Backbone was exhibited at the Aldrich Museum of Contemporary Art in Connecticut in 2012, the Taipei Fine Arts Museum and the Asia Society Hong Kong Center in 2014, the Los Angeles County Museum of Art in 2015 at SCADA in 2015-16, and at the Ullens Center for Contemporary Art in Beijing in the fall of 2018. Balcer produced a film documenting Xu Bing's Tobacco Project: Virginia (2011).

In 2006, Balcer donated a collection of works by the Japanese woodblock artist Kawase Hasui to the Virginia Museum of Fine Arts. The René and Carolyn Balcer Collection comprises some 800 works and includes woodblock prints, watercolors, screens, sketches and other works and writings by Hasui. A major exhibit of the collection, Hasui: Water & Shadow, opened at the VMFA in November 2014 and ran until March 2015. In recognition of this and other gifts to the museum, in June 2026, the VMFA awarded the John Barton Payne Medal to René and Carolyn Balcer.

In 2010, through his Mattawin Company, Balcer sponsored the publication of a 13-volume catalogue of the works of the Wuming (No Name) Group, a cooperative of underground Chinese artists during the Cultural Revolution. In the fall of 2011, Balcer and his wife Carolyn organized and sponsored the exhibition Blooming in the Shadows: Unofficial Chinese Art 1974–1985 at New York's China Institute, featuring works from the Wuming, Stars and Grass groups of experimental artists. A larger iteration of the exhibit, Light Before Dawn, opened at the new Asia Society Museum in Hong Kong in May 2013.

The exhibit was accompanied by a new documentary written and produced by Balcer, The No Name Painting Association, about the Wuming Group. The documentary was an official selection at some thirty festivals in the US, Canada, Europe and Australia, garnering a dozen awards and nominations.

In 2024, Balcer and his wife Carolyn donated their collection of some 550 Inuit prints to the Metropolitan Museum of Art in New York. The collection is among the strongest examples of Inuit graphic art in the United States; with works ranging from the mid-1940s to the present day, it includes major works by some of the most influential Indigenous women artists in history.

In 2011, Mattawin sponsored the publication of a book of photographs by Chinese artist Ai Weiwei, Ai Weiwei New York 1983–1993. In 2014, it sponsored the art exhibit Oil and Water: Reinterpreting Ink at New York's Museum of Chinese in America.

Mattawin also co-published A Token of Elegance (2015), a historical and photo survey of cigarette holders as objets d'art; Chow! Secrets of Chinese Cooking (2020), an updated edition of a timeless classic about Chinese cuisine and culture and winner of a 2021 Gourmand World Cookbook Award; and the historical biographies Kuo Ping-Wen, Scholar, Reformer, Statesman (2016) and C.T. Wang: Looking Back and Looking Forward (2008).

Balcer has contributed essays to Impressions: The Journal of the Japanese Art Society of America, and It Begins with Metamorphosis: Xu Bing.

Balcer has lectured widely about writing, art and the duties of artists in free societies, notably at Columbia, NYU, Harvard, UCLA, UPenn, and Loyola Marymount; at Internews (Moscow), the Sorbonne (Paris), Central Academy of Fine Arts (Beijing), Virginia Museum of Fine Arts, Museum of Fine Arts Boston, Canadian Film Centre (Toronto), Deauville American Film Festival, Banff World Media Festival, Monte Carlo TV Festival, International Ukiyo-e Society (Tokyo), and SPAA Conference (Brisbane).

== Filmography ==
- Averbach Vs. Zak (1976) Short
- Solid State (1976) Short
- Turcot Interchange (1978) Short
- Twist of Fate (1979) Short
- Out on the Edge (1989) TV movie
- Nasty Boys (1990) TV series
- Solar Crisis (1990) Feature Film - Uncredited Rewrite
- Stranger in the Family (1991) TV movie
- Law & Order (1990–2010) TV series
- Star Trek: The Next Generation (1992) TV Series
- The Crow (1994) Feature Film - Uncredited Rewrite
- Judge Dredd (1995) Feature Film - Uncredited Rewrite
- People V (1995) TV movie
- Mission Protection Rapprochée (1997) TV series, creator
- Law & Order: Special Victims Unit (1999) TV series
- Hopewell (2000) TV movie, creator
- Law & Order: Criminal Intent (2001–2011) TV series, creator
- Proof of Lies (2006) TV movie
- Paris Criminal Inquiries (2007–2008) TV series
- Law & Order Criminal Intent Russia (2007–2009) TV series
- Law & Order: UK (2009–2014) TV series
- Xu Bing Tobacco Project Virginia (2011) Documentary short
- Law & Order LA (2011) TV series
- The Ordained (2013) TV movie
- Watching Tea Leaves in Shanxi (2013) Video short
- Jo (2013) TV series, creator
- The No Name Painting Association (2013) Documentary Short
- Blue Sky (2013) Video Short
- For Justice (2015) TV Movie, creator
- Big Orange Predator (2016) Video Short
- The Legend of Embroidery (2017) Documentary Short
- Law & Order True Crime: The Menendez Murders (2017) Mini-series, creator
- Above the Drowning Sea (2017) Documentary Feature
- FBI (2019) TV series
- FBI: Most Wanted (2020-2025) TV series, creator
- Law & Order Toronto: Criminal Intent (2024) TV series
- From Where I Stand (2024) Documentary Short

== Awards and nominations ==
Emmy Award

- 1994 Nominated for Best Drama Series Law & Order as producer
- 1995 Nominated for Best Drama Series Law & Order as supervising producer
- 1996 Nominated for Best Drama Series Law & Order as co-executive producer
- 1997 Won for Best Drama Series Law & Order as executive producer
- 1998 Nominated for Best Drama Series Law & Order as executive producer
- 1999 Nominated for Best Drama Series Law & Order as executive producer
- 2000 Nominated for Best Drama Series Law & Order as executive producer

Writers Guild of America

- 1998 Won for Best Episode Episodic Drama
- 2000 Nominated for Best Episode Episodic Drama

Peabody Award

- 1997 Won for Law & Order

Golden Globes

- 1998 Nominated for Best Television Series - Drama Law & Order as executive producer
- 1999 Nominated for Best Television Series - Drama Law & Order as executive producer

Edgar Award – Mystery Writers of America

- 1993 Won for Best Television Episode + One Nomination
- 1994 Nominated for Best Television Episode
- 1995 Nominated for Best Television Episode
- 1998 Two Nominations for Best Television Episode
- 1999 Won for Best Television Episode
- 2000 Won for Best Television Episode + Two Nominations
- 2003 Nominated for Best Television Episode
- 2004 Nominated for Best Television Episode
- 2005 Won for Best Television Episode + Three Nominations

Producers Guild of America Award

- 1997 Won for Outstanding Producer of Episodic Television

American Psychological Association

- 1989 Award of Excellence

Advocates for Youth

- 1995 Nancy Susan Reynolds Award

International Monitor Award

- 1999 Best Achievement for Film Originated Television Series

ABA Silver Gavel Award for the Media & the Arts

- 1999 Silver Gavel Award for Television
- 2000 Silver Gavel Award for Television

Planned Parenthood

- 2004 Margaret Sanger Award

Banff Television Festival

- 2006 Nominated for Banff Rockie Award for Best Television Series

Reims International Television Festival

- 2006 Best Series or Serial
- 2006 Career Award

International Mystery Writers Festival

- 2010 Career Angie Award

Alliance for Justice

- 2010 Champion of Justice Award

Alliance for Children's Rights

- 2010 National Champion for Children Award

Indie Fest

- 2013 Award of Merit for Best Documentary Short

California International Shorts Festival

- 2013 Won for Best Documentary Short

Accolade Competition

- 2013 Award of Merit for Best Short Documentary

Best Shorts Competition

- 2013 Award of Excellence for Best Short Documentary

Kansas City Film Festival

- 2014 Won for Best US/International Short Documentary

Richmond International Film Festival

- 2014 Best of Festival for Documentary Short Film

USA Film Festival

- 2014 Nominated for Grand Prize Best Documentary Short

Williamsburg Independent Film Festival

- 2014 Distinctive Honors for Best Documentary Short

Portsmouth International Film Festival

- 2014 Won for Best Short Documentary

Madrid International Film Festival

- 2014 Nominated for Best Documentary Short
- 2018 Nominated for Best Director of a Feature Documentary
- 2018 Nominated for Scientific and Educational Award

Miami Film Festival

- 2018 Nominated for Knight Documentary Achievement Award

Pasadena International Film Festival

- 2018 Nominated for Best Documentary

Ferrara Film Festival

- 2018 Golden Dragon Award for Best Documentary
- 2018 Nominated for Best Cinematography for a Feature

New Jersey International Film Festival

- 2018 Honorable Mention, Best Documentary

Hamilton Film Festival

- 2018 Best Documentary

Sunrise Film Festival

- 2019 Best Documentary

Columbus International Film & Video Festival

- 2019 Honorable Mention for Best Documentary

== See also ==
- List of famous Montrealers
- List of Quebec actors and actresses
