= Eddie Feldmann =

American producer and screenwriter

- Occupation(s): Producer, screenwriter

Eddie Feldmann is an American producer and screenwriter. He won five Primetime Emmy Awards and was nominated for six more in the categories Outstanding Writing for a Variety Series and Outstanding Variety Series for his work on the television program Dennis Miller Live.
