= I. C. Rapoport =

American screenwriter

- Born: May 13, 1937; Bronx, New York
- Citizenship: USA
- Education: Ohio University
- Occupations: Photojournalist, Screenwriter
- Spouse: Mary J Feder
- Writing career
- Pen name: Chuck
- Period: 1955-57
- Genre: Fine Arts
- Subject: Photography
- Notable works: Aberfan: The Days After & Jos. Pilates, Rare Photos

I. C. Rapoport (Chuck Rapoport, born May 13, 1937) is known both for his work as a photojournalist in the 1960s and more recently as a TV and film screenwriter. Rapoport's photography career is noted for his Life Magazine photo essay on the aftermath of the tragic Aberfan, Wales disaster, and also for his exclusive and rare photographs of Joseph Pilates, the now famous fitness master and creator of the Pilates Method.

== Awards ==
- 1997: Edgar Allan Poe Mystery Writer's Award
- 1997: Nominated for Writers Guild Award
- 2017: Honorary Lifetime Membership in the National Union Of Journalists (NUJ), South Wales, UK for his photojournalist essay on the aftermath of the Aberfan Disaster

== Publications ==
- Sixty Strange Days - U S Army Basic Training in Words & Pictures (1966). OCLC 10943268. (out of print)
- Aberfan: The Days After: A Journey in Pictures (regarding the aftermath of the Aberfan slag collapse of 1966), Parthian Books, Cardigan, Wales (2005). ISBN 978-1-902638-62-1 (in print)

== Filmography ==
- Law & Order
- Baywatch (2 episodes, 1991–1992)
- Street Justice (1991)
- Cook & Peary: The Race to the Pole (1983)
- I Married Wyatt Earp (1983) (TV)
- Living Proof: The Hank Williams, Jr. Story (1983)
- Word of Honor (1981) (TV)
- ABC Weekend Specials
- Diary of the Dead (1976)
- To Kill a Clown (1972)

== Exhibitions ==
In April 2005, Rapoport held a large one-man exhibition of his historic and iconic photographs of the Aftermath of the 1966 Aberfan Disaster in the main gallery of the National Library of Wales in Aberystwyth, Wales.

Rapoport's photographs of Samuel Beckett were displayed in the Beckett Exposition at the Pompidou Center in Paris (Spring-2007). In the winter of 2007, a one-man showing of Rapoport's work, titled: Rapoport-Icons (JFK, Jackie K, Truffaut, Fidel Castro, Becket, Aznavour, and others - from the days he worked for Paris Match) was held in Paris at the Jim Haynes Atelier.

A second showing of Rapoport-Icons were on display in Paris at the Book and Wine store, La Belle Hortense on rue Vieille du Temple in the Marais - Paris, in May 2008.

Another one-man photographic exhibition titled: Paris Est Une Fete - 1964, a collection of Rapoport's photographs taken in Paris during the summer of 1964, opened at the end of May, 2008 at Galerie le Simoun on rue Miromesnil in the 8th arrondissement, in Paris.

A second exhibit of the Paris Impressions photographs were shown Mayberry's in Rapoport's hometown of Pacific Palisades, California. Later in the winter of 2008, a larger showing of the Paris images will be exhibited at Equator Books in Venice, California.

In Feb. 2007, Rapoport held an exhibition in Venice, California at Equator Books of his photo series: Times Square: The Way It Was.

The Aberfan Disaster Aftermath Photos were again displayed in the National Library of Wales in October 2016 and also at the same time, the images were included into a Video/film detailing Rapoport’s experiences photographing for LIFE magazine and shown to commemorate the 50th anniversary of the disaster at The Red House in Merthyr Tydfil (the town just six miles from the site of the mine-related disaster.

From 1970 to 2004 Rapoport wrote a dozen Movies of the Week for TV and worked as a staff writer and producer for Law & Order.

In April 2011, Rapoport held an exhibition in Santa Monica, California at Deyermond Art + Books of various photographs.
