= British Academy Television Award for Best Mini-Series =

Annual UK television award

British Academy Television Award
- Country: United Kingdom
- Presented by: British Academy of Film and Television Arts
- First award: 2012
- Currently held by: Adolescence (2026)
- Website: http://www.bafta.org/

The British Academy Television Award for Best Mini-Series is one of the major categories of the British Academy Television Awards (BAFTAs), the primary awards ceremony of the British television industry. The category is described by the BAFTA website as being for "a drama series, between two and 19 episodes, that tells a complete story and is not intended to return".

The category has been awarded since 2012, prior to that a similar category was awarded named Best Drama Serial, which was presented with the Best Drama Series category under the name Best Drama Series or Serial from 1970 to 1991 and as a separate category from 1992 to 2011. In 2024, the category was merged with the Best Single Drama award into one category titled Best Limited Drama.

== Winners and nominees ==
=== 1990s ===
Best Drama Serial

Year	Title	Recipient(s)	Broadcaster
1992	Prime Suspect	Lynda La Plante, Don Leaver, Christopher Menaul	ITV
1992	Clarissa	Kevin Loader, Robert Bierman, Janet Barron, David Nokes	BBC
1992	Coronation Street	Mervyn Watson	ITV
1992	GBH	David Jones, Alan Bleasdale, Robert Young	Channel 4
1993	Anglo-Saxon Attitudes	Andrew Brown, Diarmuid Lawrence, Andrew Davies	ITV
1993	The Camomile Lawn	Sophie Balhetchet, Glenn Wilhide, Peter Hall, Ken Taylor	Channel 4
1993	Prime Suspect 2	Paul Marcus, John Strickland, Allan Cubitt	ITV
1993	Goodbye Cruel World	David Snodin, Adrian Shergold, Tony Marchant	BBC Two
1994	Prime Suspect 3	Paul Marcus, David Drury, Lynda La Plante	ITV
1994	Body and Soul	Jacky Stoller, Moira Armstrong, Paul Hines, Jill Hyem	ITV
1994	The Buddha of Suburbia	Kevin Loader, Roger Michell, Hanif Kureishi	BBC Two
1994	Mr Wroe's Virgins	John Chapman, Danny Boyle, Jane Rogers	BBC
1995	Takin' Over the Asylum	Chris Parr, David Blair, Donna Franceschild	BBC Two
1995	Coronation Street	Sue Pritchard	ITV
1995	Family	Andrew Eaton, Michael Winterbottom, Roddy Doyle	BBC One
1995	Middlemarch	Louis Marks, Anthony Page, Andrew Davies	BBC Two
1996	The Politician's Wife	Jenny Edwards, Jeanna Polley, Neal Weisman, Graham Theakston, Paula Milne	Channel 4
1996	Band of Gold	Tony Dennis, Richard Standeven, Kay Mellor	ITV
1996	The Hanging Gale	Jonathan Cavendish, Diarmuid Lawrence, Allan Cubitt	BBC One
1996	Pride and Prejudice	Sue Birtwistle, Simon Langton, Andrew Davies	BBC One
1997	Our Friends in the North	Charles Pattinson, Pedr James, Simon Cellan Jones, Stuart Urban, Peter Flannery	BBC Two
1997	The Crow Road	Bradley Adams, Gavin Millar, Bryan Elsley	BBC Scotland
1997	The Fragile Heart	Brian Eastman, Patrick Lau, Paula Milne	Channel 4
1997	Gulliver's Travels	Duncan Kenworthy, Charles Sturridge, Simon Moore	Channel 4
1998	Holding On	David Snodin, Adrian Shergold, Tony Marchant	BBC Two
1998	This Life	Jane Fallon	BBC Two
1998	The Lakes	Charles Pattinson, David Blair, Jimmy McGovern	BBC One
1998	The Woman in White	Gareth Neame, Tim Fywell, David Pirie	BBC One
1999	Our Mutual Friend	Catherine Wearing, Julian Farino, Sandy Welch	BBC Two
1999	Amongst Women	Jonathan Curling, Colin Tucker, Tom Cairns, Adrian Hodges	BBC
1999	A Respectable Trade	Ruth Baumgarten, Suri Krishnamma, Philippa Gregory	BBC
1999	Vanity Fair	Gillian McNeill, Marc Munden, Andrew Davies	BBC

=== 2000s ===
Best Drama Serial

Year	Title	Recipient(s)	Broadcaster
2000	Warriors	Nigel Stafford-Clark, Peter Kosminsky, Leigh Jackson	BBC One
2000	Births, Marriages and Deaths	Greg Brenman, Adrian Shergold, Tony Grounds	BBC Two
2000	Kid in the Corner	Kate Anthony, Billie Eltringham, Tony Marchant	Channel 4
2000	Wives and Daughters	Sue Birtwistle, Nicholas Renton, Andrew Davies	BBC One
2001	Longitude	Charles Sturridge, Selwyn Roberts	Channel 4
2001	Nature Boy	Catherine Wearing, Joe Wright, Bryan Elsley	BBC Two
2001	Never Never	Lynn Horsford, Julian Jarrold, Tony Marchant	Channel 4
2001	This Is Personal: The Hunt for the Yorkshire Ripper	Mike Dormer, David Richards, Neil McKay	ITV
2002	The Way We Live Now	Nigel Stafford-Clark, David Yates, Andrew Davies	BBC One
2002	Perfect Strangers	John Chapman, Stephen Poliakoff	BBC Two
2002	Bob and Rose	Anne Harrison-Baxter, Julian Farino, Joe Wright, Russell T Davies	ITV
2002	The Russian Bride	Eileen Quinn, Nicholas Renton, Guy Hibbert	ITV
2003	Shackleton	Selwyn Roberts, Charles Sturridge	Channel 4
2003	Auf Wiedersehen, Pet	Paul Seed, Dick Clement, Ian La Frenais, Joy Spink	BBC One
2003	Dr Zhivago	Ann Pivcevic, Giacamo Campiotti, Andrew Davies	ITV
2003	Murder	Rebecca DeSouza, Beeban Kidron, Abi Morgan	BBC Two
2004	Charles II: The Power and the Passion	Kate Harwood, Adrian Hodges, Joe Wright	BBC One
2004	Prime Suspect	David Boulter, Peter Berry, Tom Hooper	ITV
2004	The Second Coming	Ann Harrison-Baxter, Adrian Shergold, Russell T Davies	ITV
2004	State of Play	David Yates, Hilary Bevan Jones, Paul Abbott	BBC One
2005	Sex Traffic	Derek Wax, David Yates, Abi Morgan	Channel 4
2005	Blackpool	Kate Lewis, Julie-Anne Robinson, Peter Bowker	BBC One
2005	The Long Firm	Liza Marshall, Billie Eltringham, Joe Penhall	BBC Two
2005	Outlaws		BBC Three
2006	Bleak House	Nigel Stafford-Clark, Justin Chadwick, Susanna White, Andrew Davies	BBC One
2006	Funland	Sanne Wohlenberg, Jeremy Dyson, Simon Ashdown, Kenton Allen	BBC Three
2006	Fingersmith	Sally Head, Georgina Lowe, Aisling Walsh, Peter Ransley	BBC One
2006	To the Ends of the Earth	Lynn Horsford, David Attwood, Tony Basgallop, Leigh Jackson	BBC Two
2007	See No Evil: The Moors Murders	Lisa Gilchrist, Neil McKay, Jeff Pope, Chris Menaul	ITV
2007	Low Winter Sun	Greg Brenman, Adrian Shergold, Simon Donald, Rhonda Smith	Channel 4
2007	The Virgin Queen	Coky Giedroyc, Paula Milne, Paul Rutman	BBC One
2007	Prime Suspect: The Final Act	Andrew Benson, Philip Martin, Frank Deasy, Andy Harries	ITV
2008	Britz	Peter Kosminsky, David Aukin, Hal Vogel, Steve Clark-Hall	Channel 4
2008	Cranford	Sue Birtwistle, Simon Curtis, Heidi Thomas	BBC One
2008	Five Days	Paul Rutman, Otto Bathurst, Simon Curtis, Gwyneth Hughes	BBC One
2008	Murphy's Law	Greg Brenman, Stephen Smallwood, Russell Lewis, Colm McCarthy	BBC One
2009	Criminal Justice	Pier Wilkie, Otto Bathurst, Peter Moffat	BBC One
2009	Dead Set	Charlie Brooker, Annabel Jones, Yann Demange	Channel 4
2009	The Devil's Whore	Peter Flannery, Martine Brant, Marc Munden, Jake Lushington	Channel 4
2009	House of Saddam	Steven Lightfoot, Alex Holmes, Stephen Butchard	BBC Two

=== 2010s ===
Best Drama Serial

Year	Title	Recipient(s)	Broadcaster
2010	Occupation	Peter Bowker, Derek Wax, Nick Murphy, Laurie Borg	BBC One
2010	Red Riding		Channel 4
2010	Small Island	Paula Milne, Alison Owen, Vicky Licorish, John Alexander	BBC One
2010	Unforgiven	Sally Wainwright, Nicola Schindler, Karen Lewis, David Lewis	ITV
2011	Any Human Heart	Lynn Horsford, Lee Morris, Sally Woodward Gentle, Michael Samuels	Channel 4
2011	Mad Dogs	Cris Cole, Andy Harries, Suzanne Mackie, Adrian Shergold	Sky1
2011	The Sinking of the Laconia	Alan Bleasdale, Jonathan Young, Uwe Janson, Hilary Norrish	BBC Two
2011	The Promise	Peter Kosminsky, David Aukin, Hal Vogel	Channel 4

Best Mini-Series

Year	Title	Recipient(s)	Broadcaster
2012	This Is England '88	Mark Herbert, Shane Meadows, Jack Thorne, Rebekah Wray-Rogers	Channel 4
2012	Appropriate Adult	Lisa Gilchrist, Julian Jarrold, Neil McKay, Jeff Pope	ITV
2012	The Crimson Petal and the White	Lucinda Coxon, Steve Lightfoot, Marc Munden, David M Thompson	BBC Two
2012	Top Boy	Ronan Bennett, Yann Demange, Alasdair Flind, Charles Steel	Channel 4
2013	Room at the Top	Aisling Walsh, Amanda Coe, Paul Frift, Kate Triggs	BBC Four
2013	Accused	Sita Williams, Roxy Spencer, Jimmy McGovern, Ashley Pearce	BBC One
2013	Mrs Biggs	Jeff Pope, Kwadjo Dajan, Paul Whittington	ITV
2013	Parade’s End	Selwyn Roberts, Tom Stoppard, Susanna White, David Parfitt	BBC Two
2014	In the Flesh	Hilary Martin, Ann Harrison-Baxter, Dominic Mitchell, Jonny Campbell	BBC Three
2014	The Fall	Allan Cubitt, Jakob Verbruggen, Julian Stevens, Gub Neal	BBC Two
2014	Southcliffe	Tony Grisoni, Sean Durkin, Peter Carlton, Derrin Schlesinger	Channel 4
2014	The Great Train Robbery		BBC One
2015	The Lost Honour of Christopher Jefferies	Gareth Neame, Peter Morgan, Roger Michell, Kevin Loader	ITV
2015	Our World War		BBC Three
2015	Cilla	Jeff Pope, Paul Whittington, Kwadjo Dajan, Robert Willis	ITV
2015	Prey	Chris Lunt, Nicola Shindler, Tom Sherry, Nick Murphy	ITV
2016	This Is England '90	Shane Meadows, Mark Herbert, Jack Thorne, Rebekah Wray-Rogers	Channel 4
2016	Doctor Foster	Mike Bartlett, Tom Vaughan, Roanna Benn, Jude Liknaitzky	BBC One
2016	The Enfield Haunting	Kristoffer Nyholm, Joshua St Johnston, Adrian Sturges, Jamie Campbell	Sky Living
2016	London Spy	Juliette Howell, Tom Rob Smith, Guy Heeley, Jakob Verbruggen	BBC Two
2017	National Treasure	George Ormond, Marc Munden, Jack Thorne, John Chapman	Channel 4
2017	The Hollow Crown: The Wars of the Roses	Dominic Cooke, Rupert Ryle-Hodges, Pippa Harris, Sam Mendes	BBC Two
2017	The Witness for the Prosecution		BBC One
2017	The Secret	Mark Redhead, Nick Murphy, Jonathan Curling, Stuart Urban	ITV
2018	Three Girls	Nicole Taylor, Philippa Lowthorpe, Susan Hogg, Simon Lewis	BBC One
2018	Howards End	Kenneth Lonergan, Hettie Macdonald, Laura Hastings-Smith, Sophie Gardiner	BBC One
2018	The Moorside	Neil McKay, Paul Whittington, Ken Horn, Jeff Pope	BBC One
2018	The State	Peter Kosminsky, Steve Clark-Hall, Liza Marshall, Kris Thykier	Channel 4
2019	Patrick Melrose	Michael Jackson, Rachael Horovitz, Edward Berger, David Nicholls	Sky Atlantic
2019	A Very English Scandal	Russell T. Davies, Stephen Frears, Dominic Treadwell-Collins, Dan Winch	BBC One
2019	Mrs Wilson	Ruth Kenley-Letts, Richard Laxton, Anna Symon, Ruth Wilson	BBC One
2019	Kiri	Jack Thorne, George Ormond, Toby Bentley, Euros Lyn	Channel 4

=== 2020s ===
Year	Title	Recipient(s)	Broadcaster
2020	Chernobyl		Sky Atlantic
2020	A Confession	Jeff Pope, Paul Andrew Williams, Tom Dunbar, Johnny Capps	ITV
2020	The Victim	Rob Williams, Niall MacCormick, Sarah Brown, Jenny Frayn	BBC One
2020	The Virtues	Shane Meadows, Jack Thorne, Mark Herbert, Nickie Sault	Channel 4
2021	I May Destroy You		BBC One
2021	Adult Material	Lucy Kirkwood, Dawn Shadforth, Sara Hamill, Patrick Spence	Channel 4
2021	Small Axe	Steve McQueen, Tracey Scoffield, David Tanner, Michael Elliott, Anita Overland	BBC One
2021	Normal People	Lenny Abrahamson, Sally Rooney, Ed Guiney, Andrew Lowe, Emma Norton, Catherine Magee	BBC Three
2022	Time		BBC One
2022	It's a Sin	Russell T Davies, Nicola Shindler, Peter Hoar, Phil Collinson	Channel 4
2022	Landscapers	Will Sharpe, Ed Sinclair, Katie Carpenter, Olivia Colman, Jane Featherstone, Chris Fry	Sky Atlantic
2022	Stephen	Mark Redhead, Madonna Baptiste, Alrick Riley, Frank Cottrell Boyce, Joe Cottrell Boyce, Jessica Sharkey	ITV
2023	Mood	Nicôle Lecky, Margery Bone, Lisa Walters, Dawn Shadforth, Stroma Cairns	BBC Three
2023	A Spy Among Friends	Alexander Cary, Nick Murphy, Chrissy Skinns, Patrick Spence, Damian Lewis	ITVX
2023	This Is Going to Hurt	Adam Kay, Jane Featherstone, Naomi de Pear, James Farrell, Holly Pullinger, Lucy Forbes	BBC One
2023	The Thief, His Wife and the Canoe	David Nath, Richard Laxton, Chris Lang, Alison Sterling	ITV

Best Limited Drama

Year	Title	Recipient(s)	Broadcaster
2024	The Sixth Commandment	Derek Wax, Brian Woods, Sarah Phelps, Saul Dibb, Frances du Pille	BBC One
2024	Best Interests	Toby Bentley, Jenny Frayn, Sophie Gardiner, Michael Keillor, Jack Thorne	BBC One
2024	Black Mirror: "Demon 79"	Charlie Brooker, Richard Webb, Jessica Rhoades, Bisha K. Ali, Annabel Jones, Toby Haynes	Netflix
2024	The Long Shadow	George Kay, Lewis Arnold, Matt Sandford, Sarah Lewis, Sacha Szwarc, Willow Grylls	ITV1
2025	Mr Bates vs The Post Office	Patrick Spence, James Strong, Gwyneth Hughes, Chris Clough, Natasha Bondy, Joe Williams	ITV1
2025	Baby Reindeer	Richard Gadd, Weronika Tofilska, Petra Fried, Matt Jarvis, Ed Macdonald, Matthew Mulot	Netflix
2025	One Day	Nicole Taylor, Molly Manners, Roanna Benn, Jude Liknaitzky, David Nicholls, Nige Watson	Netflix
2025	Lost Boys and Fairies	Rebekah Wray-Rogers, Jessica Brown Meek, Libby Durdy, Daf James, James Kent, Adam Knopf	BBC One
2026	Adolescence	Stephen Graham, Jack Thorne, Philip Barantini, Jo Johnson, Mark Herbert, Hannah Walters	Netflix
2026	I Fought the Law	Liza Marshall, Charlotte Webber, Erik Richter Strand, Jamie Crichton, Mark Hedges	ITV
2026	Trespasses	Amanda Posey, Maria Mulhall, Dawn Shadforth, Ailbhe Keogan	Channel 4
2026	What It Feels Like for a Girl	Liza Marshall, Ron O'Berst, Brian Welsh, Paris Lees, Frances du Pille	BBC Three

- Note: The series that don't have recipients on the tables had Production team credited as recipients for the award or nomination.
