= Ambika Mod =

British actress, comedian, and writer (born 1995)

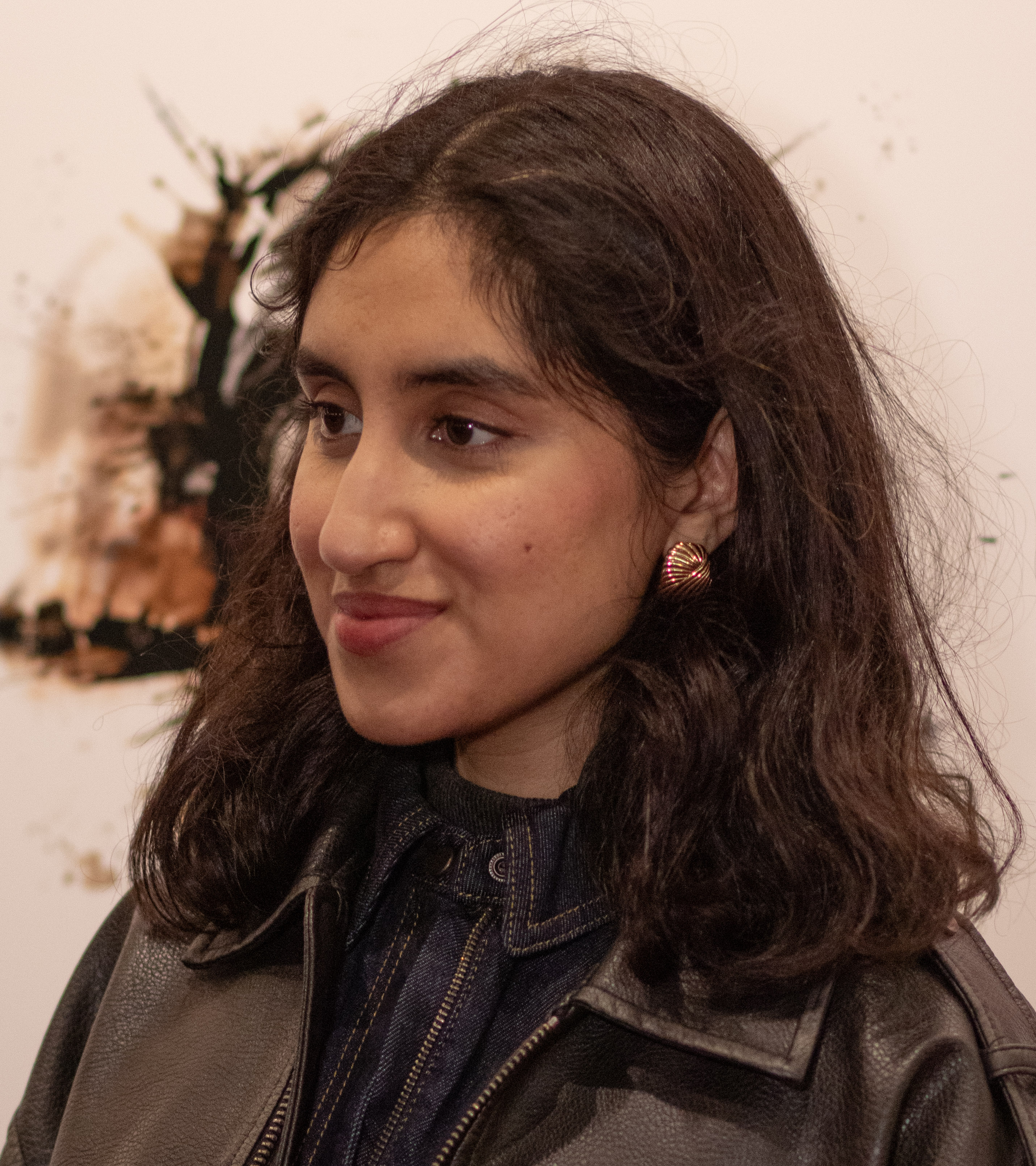
- Mod in 2025
- Born: Ambika Bhakti Mod; 2 October 1995 (age 31); Hatfield, Hertfordshire, England
- Education: St Mary's College, Durham (BA)
- Occupations: Actress, comedian, writer
- Years active: 2018–present

Ambika Bhakti Mod (/ˈʌmbɪkə ˈbʌkti ˈmoʊd/; born 2 October 1995) is an English actress, comedian, and writer. She is best known for her roles in the BBC drama series This Is Going to Hurt (2022) and the Netflix miniseries One Day (2024), for which she gained wider recognition. She has since starred in the thriller series The Stolen Girl (2025) for Disney+.

== Early life and education ==
Mod grew up in Potters Bar, Hertfordshire. She is the daughter of Indian immigrants; her mother arrived in the UK as a child, and her father in his 20s. Mod attended Dame Alice Owen's School. She graduated with a Bachelor of Arts degree in English Studies from St Mary's College, Durham.

Early in her career, Mod worked as a personal assistant at Condé Nast as her day job while doing comedy at night. She studied acting at Theatrix Performing Arts of St Albans, based at the Abbey Theatre, St Albans. At Durham, she did sketch comedy through the university's Revue, performing with Tom Harper at the 2015 Edinburgh Fringe Festival and serving as the troupe's president in 2017. She formed a duo, Megan from HR, with Andrew Shires. She performs regularly at improvised comedy theatre The Free Association in London.

== Career ==
After appearing in a series of short films—Fair Bnb, Granddaughter, The Sacrifice (aka Leila Margot), and Pet Name—Mod was cast as Shruti Acharya, a struggling junior doctor opposite Ben Whishaw in This Is Going to Hurt (2022), a medical drama based on Adam Kay's memoir of the same name. The series earned unanimous acclaim from critics; Daniel Fienberg of The Hollywood Reporter deemed Mod as the standout among the "regular female characters", praising how she turned Shruti's "earnest fragility into the show's true heart". However, he also noted that the character often functioned primarily as a vehicle for Kay's actions. For her performance, Mod was selected for the 2022 BAFTA Breakthrough cohort and won the Broadcasting Press Guild Award for Best Actress. Through the BAFTA programme, she met Emma Thompson, who later became her mentor.

I think part of the reason why I just didn't see myself playing that part was because insidiously and implicitly, that's a message that I’ve been fed my entire life—that people who look like me aren't romantic leads, that people who look like me aren't the people who the male romantic lead will fall in love with.

— Mod, 2024

In 2024, Mod starred as Emma Morley in Netflix's One Day, adapted from David Nicholls' novel of the same name. The series follows two young people (played by Mod and Leo Woodall) who reconnect annually over 14 years after a one-night stand. Mod initially declined the role, as the emotionally demanding nature of her performance in This Is Going to Hurt left her doubting her ability to take on a romantic lead. Her portrayal, however, earned widespread critical acclaim and proved to be a breakthrough in her career. Upon release, One Day became the most-watched Netflix series worldwide that week. Writing for The Guardian, Chitra Ramaswamy found Mod to be a "revelation", adding that " it is hard to believe this is her first lead role". Reflecting on her character's change in ethnicity from the book and earlier film adaptation, Mod expressed hope that it would "open people's minds a little bit," acknowledging its significance for "a lot of people, especially young women of colour, young South Asian women in particular".

In 2025, Mod featured in supporting roles in the action films Black Bag and Sacrifice. In the Disney+ thriller series The Stolen Girl, she starred as a journalist attempting to locate a missing girl. Emily Godwin of The Evening Standard considered Mod to be the series' prime asset but The Guardian's Lucy Mangan found the plot to be too contingent on her character's "borderline clairvoyant powers".

Seeking a more light-hearted role than her previous performances, Mod featured as an assassin in the second series of Netflix's Black Doves (2026), starring alongside Keira Knightley. To prepare for the role, she underwent extensive stunt training, having described herself as "not naturally physical or well coordinated". Her performance received positive reviews from critics. Mod also joined the Harry Potter: The Full-Cast Audio Editions in the role of Nymphadora Tonks. She made her first appearance in the audio release of Harry Potter and the Order of the Phoenix in March 2026.

== Media image ==
In 2024, Mod was included in the Forbes 30 Under 30 Europe list under the Entertainment category, recognised for her advocacy for greater industry representation and her performances in This Is Going to Hurt and One Day. The Sunday Times named Mod one of the 25 most inspiring people aged 30 and under in the UK and Ireland. Later that year, Mod was featured on Time's annual TIME100 Next list of emerging leaders shaping the future, with Mindy Kaling writing: "It feels like there's nothing to make you sit up, lean forward, and say, 'Wow, I’ve never seen that before.' But that's exactly how I felt when I saw Ambika Mod in [...] One Day."

Mod was also named one of Harper's Bazaar UK's 2024 Women of the Year, receiving the Breakthrough of the Year award. In November 2024, she received one of British GQ's Men of the Year awards. In February 2025, Mod was included in Elle's 40 For 40: Women in Film and Television list, described as a "power list of the women who'll shape the coming decades in film and television." Author Hanna Flint wrote: "Ambika is a rising star in television [...] she's reshaping what it means to be a leading lady." In September 2025, she signed an open pledge with Film Workers for Palestine, committing not to collaborate with Israeli film institutions "that are implicated in genocide and apartheid against the Palestinian people."

== Filmography ==
=== Film ===
Year	Title	Role	Notes	Ref.
2018	Fair BnB	Izzy	Short film	
2019	Granddaughter	Phoebe	Short film	
2020	The Sacrifice (aka Leila Margot)	Rukhsana	Short film	
2022	Pet Name	Sophie	Short film	
2025	Black Bag	Angela Childs		
2025	Sacrifice	Katie		
2026	Swapped	Violet	Voice	

=== Television ===
Year	Title	Role	Notes	Ref.
2019	The Mash Report	Sarah / Average Young Person	Series 4; episode 6	
2020	The B@it	Samantha	Episode: "Ending Other People's Relationships"	
2021	Trying	Usher	Episode: "I'm Scared"	
2022	This Is Going to Hurt	Shruti Acharya	Main role. Mini-series; 7 episodes	
2022	Martin Fishback	Samah	Television Special	
2022	I Hate Suzie	Una Finch	Series 2; episodes 1 & 3	
2024	One Day	Emma Morley	Main role. 14 episodes	
2024	Comic Relief: Funny for Money	Herself	Red Nose Day fundraising telethon	
2025	The Stolen Girl	Selma Desai	Main role. Mini-series; 5 episodes	
2026	Black Doves	Laila	Series 2	
2026	Living the Dream			

=== Theatre ===
Year	Title	Role	Venue	Ref.
2015	Cirque du Silly	Self	Edinburgh Fringe Festival	
2019	Children of the Quorn	Self	Edinburgh Fringe Festival	
2024	3	Self	Edinburgh Fringe Festival	
2024	White Rabbit Red Rabbit	Self	@sohoplace	
2025	Porn Play	Ani	Royal Court Theatre	
2025	Every Brilliant Thing	Narrator	@sohoplace	

=== Audio ===
Year	Title	Role	Notes	Ref.
2022	Doctor Who: Redacted	Captain Chopra	BBC Sounds	
2024	Bleak House	Esther Summerson	Audible	
2026	Harry Potter: The Full-Cast Audio Editions	Nymphadora Tonks	Audible	

== Awards and nominations ==
Year	Association	Category	Work	Result	Ref.
2020	Funny Women Awards	Stage Award		Semi-finalist	
2022	Edinburgh TV Awards	Breakthrough Talent – Actor	This Is Going to Hurt	Nominated	
2023	BPG Television, Streaming and Audio Awards	Best Actress	This Is Going to Hurt	Won	
2023	RTS Programme Awards	Supporting Actor – Female	This Is Going to Hurt	Won	
2024	Gotham TV Awards	Outstanding Performance in a Limited Series	One Day	Nominated	
2024	Harper's Bazaar Women of the Year Awards	Breakthrough of the Year	One Day	Won	
2024	Rose d'Or Awards	Emerging Talent	One Day	Won	
2024	Women In Film & TV Awards	Netflix New Talent Award	One Day	Won	
2025	Newport Beach Film Festival U.K. Honours	Spotlight Artist Award	One Day	Won	
2025	RTS Programme Awards	Leading Actor – Female	One Day	Nominated	
