= Black Doves =

British spy action TV series (2024–present)

- Release poster for the first series
- Genre: Action drama; Spy thriller
- Created by: Joe Barton
- Starring: Keira Knightley; Ben Whishaw; Sarah Lancashire
- Ending theme: "Bang Bang (My Baby Shot Me Down)" by Raye
- Composers: Martin Phipps; Ian Arber
- Country of origin: United Kingdom
- Original language: English
- No. of series: 2
- No. of episodes: 12

Production
- Executive producers: Jane Featherstone; Chris Fry; Joe Barton; Keira Knightley
- Producers: Harry Munday; Callum Devrell-Cameron
- Production location: London
- Cinematography: Giulio Biccari; Mark Patten; Ben Wheeler; Gary Shaw
- Editors: Simon Brasse; Richard Graham; Johnny Rayner; Josh Cunliffe; Pia Di Ciaula; Elen Pierce Lewis
- Running time: 52–56 minutes
- Production companies: Noisy Bear; Sister

Original release
- Network: Netflix
- Release: 5 December 2024 – present

Black Doves is a British spy action thriller television series created by Joe Barton. The series, starring Keira Knightley, Ben Whishaw, and Sarah Lancashire, is developed by Sister and Barton's production company Noisy Bear for Netflix. The series is about a spies-for-hire organisation that obtains secrets for the highest bidder. Ahead of its premiere on 5 December 2024, it was renewed for a second series which was released in full on 5 November 2026.

The series received positive reviews from critics and Knightley was nominated for the Golden Globe Award for Best Actress – Television Series Drama for her performance.

== Premise ==
Helen, the wife of the Secretary of State for Defence of the United Kingdom, learns that her secret identity as a spy is in danger after her lover is killed by London's underworld. Her employers, "the Black Doves", a 'Spies-for-hire' organisation – that retrieves industrial, political or diplomatic secrets for the highest bidder – send Sam, an old friend, to protect her.

== Cast and characters ==
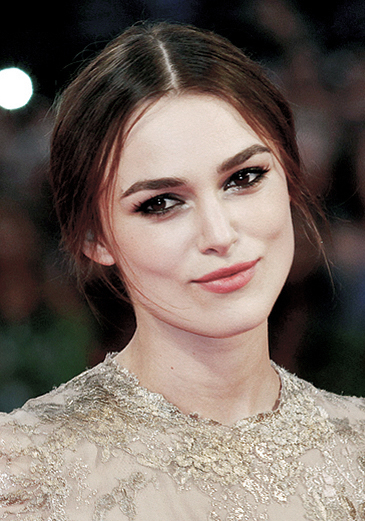
Keira Knightley as Helen Webb

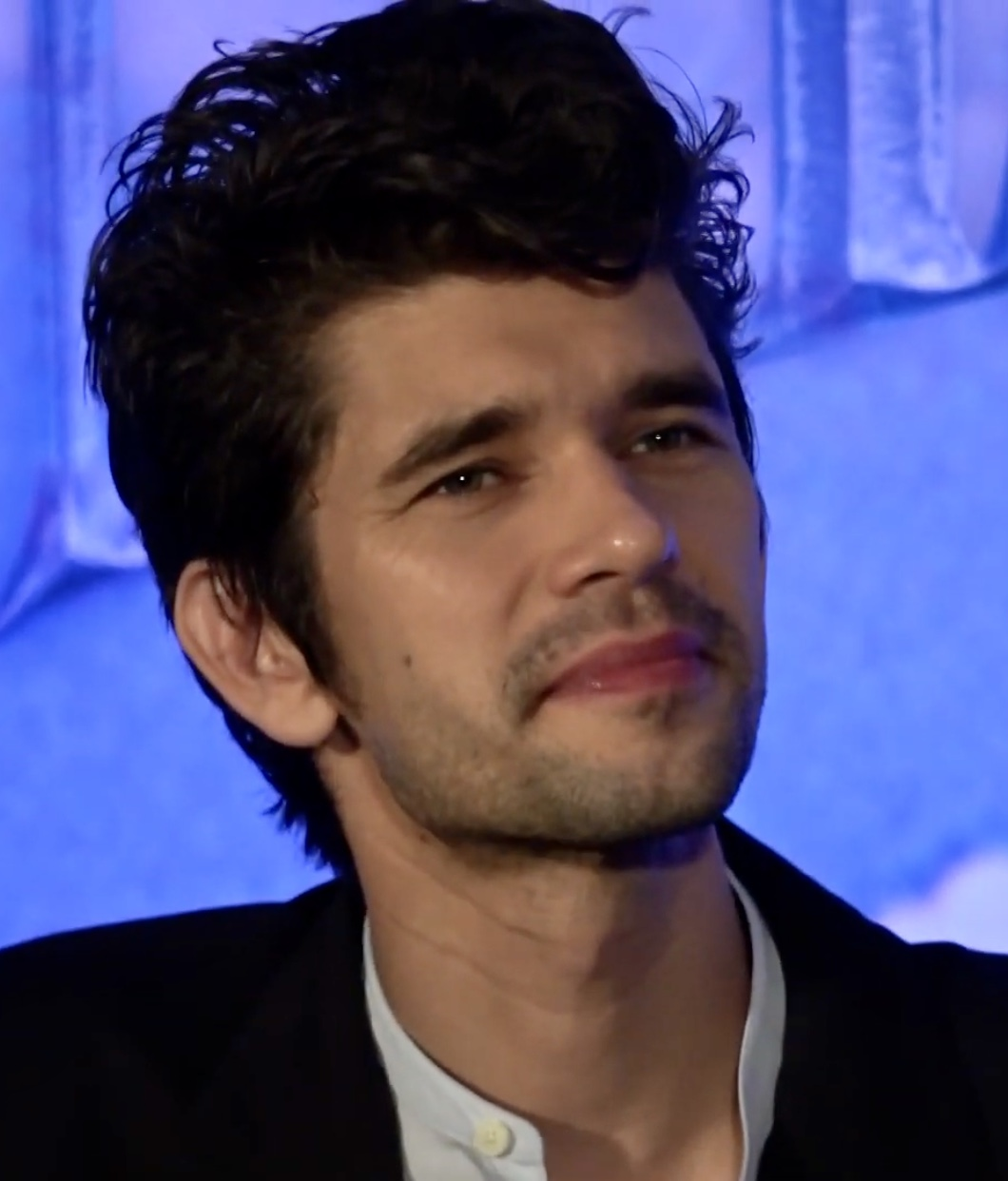
Ben Whishaw as Sam Young

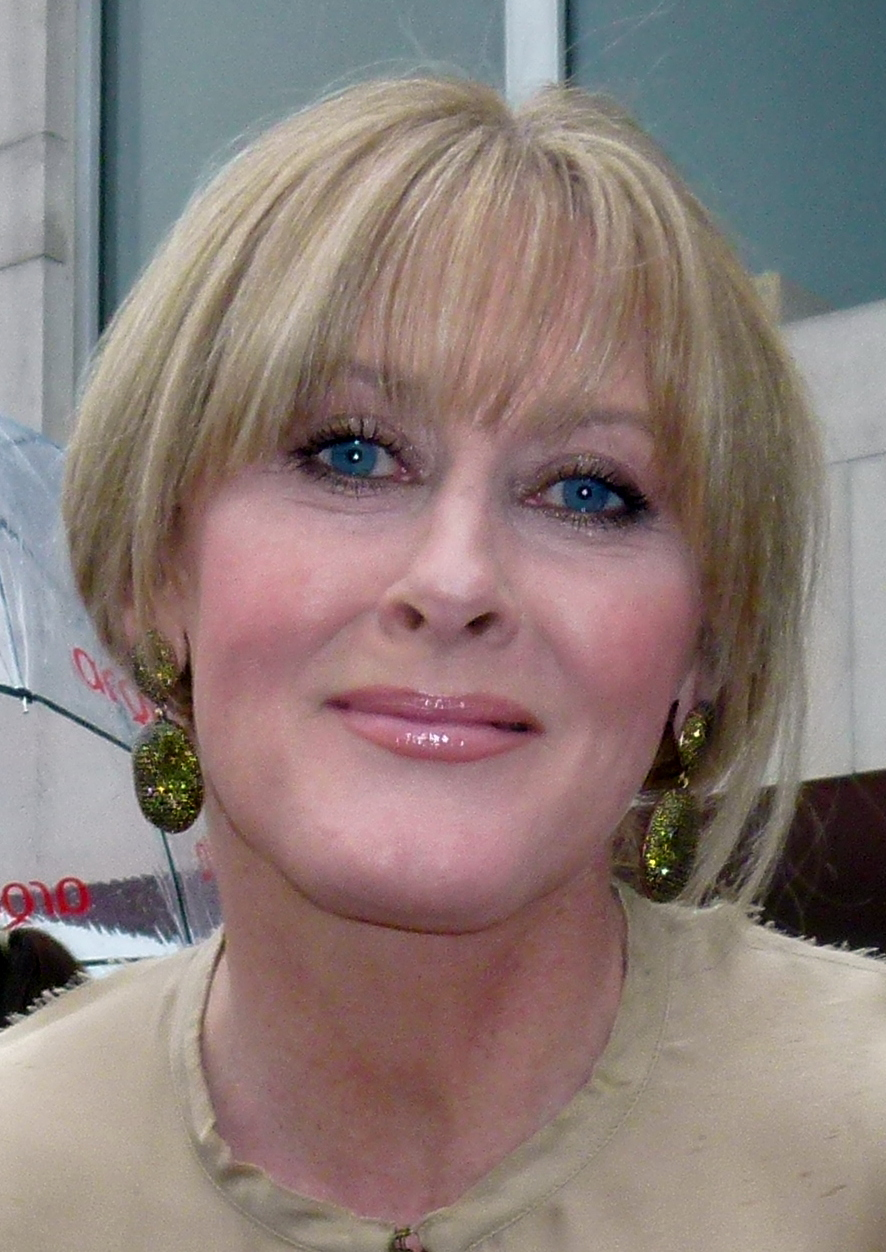
Sarah Lancashire as Elizabeth Reed

=== Main ===
- Keira Knightley as Helen Webb (née Dawson)
- Ben Whishaw as Sam Young
- Sarah Lancashire as Elizabeth Reed

=== Recurring ===
- Andrew Buchan as Wallace Webb, Secretary of State for Defence and Conservative MP for Skipton and Ripon.
- Andrew Koji as Jason Davies, a Ministry of Justice civil servant. (series 1)
- Omari Douglas as Michael, Sam's ex-boyfriend (series 1)
- Sam Troughton as Police Commissioner Stephen Yarrick
- Ella Lily Hyland as Fionnuala Williams
- Gabrielle Creevy as Eleanor Davies
- Isabella Wei as Kai-Ming Chen (series 1)
- Adam Silver as Arnie (series 1)
- Nathan Stewart-Jarrett as Zack (series 1)
- Agnes O'Casey as Dani, Wallace's new assistant
- Tai Yin Chan as Wu Lin (series 1)
- Charlotte Rice-Foley as Jacqueline Webb, Wallace and Helen's daughter
- Taylor Sullivan as Oliver "Oli" Webb, Wallace and Helen's son
- Molly Chesworth as Marie, the Webb family's nanny
- Ken Nwosu as Bill
- Andy Cheung as Ambassador Jun Chen, Kai-Ming Chen's father (series 1)
- Kathryn Hunter as Lenny Lines (series 1, guest series 2)
- Luther Ford as Hector Newman (series 1)
- Finn Bennett as Cole Atwood, a CIA agent and Kai-Ming Chen's associate (series 1)
- Dan Li as Chang Hao, a Chinese envoy
- Adeel Akhtar as Richard Eaves, Prime Minister of the United Kingdom (series 1)
- William Hope as Mitch Porter, CIA station chief (series 1)
- Adam Best as Jim Perryman (series 2, guest series 1)
- Babou Ceesay as Mr. Conteh (series 2)
- Sam Riley as Patrick (series 2)
- Ambika Mod as Laila Joshi (series 2)
- Sylvia Hoeks as Katia Chernov (series 2)
- Samuel Barnett as Jerry Doran (series 2)
- Michelle Duncan as Mrs. Conduct (series 2)
- Neve Campbell as Cecile Mason (series 2)
- Fiz Marcus as Receptionist (series 2)

=== Guest ===
- Hannah Khalique-Brown as Maggie Jones, an assistant in a jewellery shop (series 1)
- Thomas Coombes as Phillip Bray, a tabloid reporter (series 1)
- Lizzie Hopley as Beth (series 1)
- Antonia Campbell-Hughes as Georgina "George" (series 1)
- Julian Wadham as Andy (series 1)
- Jennifer Armour as Vanessa Robinson, the diplomatic secretary at the Embassy of the United States, London (series 1)
- Timothy Harker as Les Mullery, Director General of MI5 (series 1)
- Paapa Essiedu as Elmore Fitch (series 1)
- Steve Wall as Frank (series 1)
- Tracey Ullman as Alex Clark (series 1)
- Angus Cooper as Trent Clark, Kai-Ming Chen's drug dealer friend (series 1)
- Goran Kostic as Alexi Chernov (series 2)
- Nadia Albina as Mrs. Burkinshaw (series 2)
- Dempsey Bovell as Daryl (series 2)
- Trevor Fox as Mark Moore (series 2)
- Will Austin as Whiteman (series 2)
- Paul Antony-Barber as Mr. Rogers (series 2)
- Helen Schlesinger as Melanie Ambrose (series 2)
- Ian Attard as Jono (series 2)
- Julianna Kurokawa as Zara (series 2)
- Francesco Acquaroli as Matteo (series 2)
- Olivia Nielsen as Claire (series 2)
- Artjom Gilz as young Franz (series 2)
- Lauren Moakes as Elizabeth (series 2)
- Kristin Suckow as Julia (series 2)
- Théo Augier as Thomas (series 2)
- Zachary Hart as Bernard (series 2)
- Asja Mascarini as Luna (series 2)
- Rainer Wöss as Old Franz (series 2)
- Roman Schomburg as Maddison (series 2)
- Bailey Fines as young Vita (series 2)
- Daniel Olson as young Erik Klein (series 2)
- Abbie Kidd as young Melanie Ambrose (series 2)
- Nikola Kostic as young Alexi Chernov (series 2)
- Ayesha Griffiths as Hannah (series 2)
- Marcus Onilude as Detective Adams (series 2)
- Hywel Morgan as Commissioner Thomas (series 2)
- Louise Lee as Denise (series 2)
- Dave Christie-Miller as Russell (series 2)
- Rowan Polonski as Greg (series 2)

== Episodes ==
Series	Episodes	Originally released
1	6	5 December 2024
2	6	5 November 2026

=== Series 1 (2024) ===
No. overall	No. in series	Title	Directed by	Written by	Original release date
1	1	"To Love Then"	Alex Gabassi	Joe Barton	5 December 2024
Helen Dawson is married to Wallace Webb, the Secretary of State for Defence. Unbeknownst to Wallace, Helen is a "Black Dove", a spy who has been passing information to a mercenary organization that buys and sells information. At a Christmas party, Helen's handler Reed informs her that Jason Davies, a civil servant and Helen's lover, has been murdered along with tabloid reporter Phillip and store clerk Maggie. Helen believes his death is unconnected to her, though Reed is not so sure. Reed calls in Sam, a hitman who has been absent for seven years, to protect Helen and investigate Jason's murder. While Helen is looking for clues in Jason's appartment, she gets surprised by a duo of female assassins, Williams and Kent, but Sam appears and kills the latter. Sam discovers that shortly before his death, Jason was calling Kai-Ming, the daughter of the late Chinese ambassador to the United Kingdom. The latter's death may have been more complicated than originally reported.
2	2	"A Little Black Dove"	Alex Gabassi	Joe Barton	5 December 2024
In 2014, Helen, going by the name of Daisy, is recruited by the Black Doves. On her first job, she has a one-night stand with Wallace but returns to his place after realizing that she left her deceased mother's lighter in his room, and decides to stay. In the present, Helen learns that Jason was killed by a sniper named Elmore Fitch. He attacks Helen in her home seeking information about Kai-Ming and a mysterious video, but Helen fights and ends up killing him. Meanwhile Sam is approached by his former boss, Lenny Lines, who threatens to kill his ex-lover Michael and daughter unless Sam finishes an assassination he abandoned seven years ago.
3	3	"The Coming Night"	Alex Gabassi	Joe Barton	5 December 2024
In 2014, Sam begins working as a trigger man for Lenny. In 2017, he is assigned to assassinate the four Newman brothers, but fails to complete the job fully when he discovers the last of them, Hector, is a child. Later on, Hector himself sends assassins after Sam at the flat he shares with Michael. While heavily pregnant, Helen rescues Sam and Michael, staying with Reed's organisation to ensure their further safety, as Sam flees the country. In the present, Sam teams up with Williams and her new partner, Eleanor, to kill Hector and rescue Kai-Ming. Helen discovers that her friend, a police commissioner Yarrick might be involved with Jason's murder. She obtains Yarrick's phone with a help of Sam, and sends a message to a mysterious number on the phone, but as a result - Yarrick is captured and killed. His captors threaten to come after Helen. Wallace learns through private Chinese backchannels that the ambassador to China may have been killed by the American CIA with support from Britain. It is revealed that Sam's first hit was his own father, who had also been an assassin.
4	4	"Go Bang Time"	Lisa Gunning	Joe Barton	5 December 2024
After an assault on Hector's gang hideaway, Sam saves Kai-Ming, whom he leaves in the care of Williams and Eleanor. They realize they are being watched. Sam visits his ex-boyfriend, Michael. Helen learns Jason may have had another partner. Reed convinces Helen to infiltrate the American embassy to bring CIA agent Cole Atwood an envelope with an offer of money to betray his country. Cole reveals he did not kill Kai-Ming's father but was instead using the young woman to access her drug connection, Trent Clark, who is part of an international crime family. When Cole asks for his family to be released, Helen realizes that Reed's envelope contained a threat, and she was set up. Wallace learns that Yarrick is dead and struggles with what that means. Wallace’s recently hired secretary Dani, who Helen suspects was planted by Reed to replace her, flirts with Wallace. Dani alludes to Helen’s affair with Jason without naming him.
5	5	"The Cost of It All"	Lisa Gunning	Joe Barton	5 December 2024
The Clarks kidnap Eleanor and Kai-Ming. Sam, with Helen, Cole and the wounded Williams, flee to Michael's apartment. Reed tells Sam to kill Alex Clark. Dani tells Wallace that Helen is having an affair. He tells Helen that he has always loved her. Later, Helen realizes that the video recording everyone is looking for, might be at the jewellery shop where Maggie worked. She locates the recording in the shop safe and discovers Dani waiting at the front of the shop. She confirms to Helen that she is also a Black Dove, and is training to be Helen's replacement with Wallace. Dani and Helen get into a knife fight, with Helen winning, but sparing Dani's life. On watching the recording, Helen discovers that Trent is the one who killed the Chinese ambassador, albeit accidentally. The recording reveals that Yarrick and the British Prime Minister were involved in covering up the crime.
6	6	"In the Bleak Midwinter"	Lisa Gunning	Joe Barton	5 December 2024
Helen takes the recording of the murder to crime family matriarch Alex Clark in exchange for freeing Sam, Eleanor, and Kai-Ming. All seems settled until Helen, overcome by rage and grief, prepares to kill Alex as retribution for killing her lover, Jason. Discovering the hit was ordered by Trent, trying to cover his tracks, Sam saves Helen by killing both Alex and Trent. He is warned by an anonymous voice that his executions have been seen. Helen gives the recording of the ambassador's death to the CIA, who use it to clear themselves to China. It is implied that Wallace, who truly knew nothing of the Prime Minister's involvement, will be his replacement. Reed welcomes Helen back to the fold, and informs her that Jason was actually a spy for MI5 sent to investigate Helen – Maggie was working for him, and selling gossip to Phillip, with Phillip revealing all to Yarrick, thus setting in motion the first four murders. Though Helen confessed to Jason she was a Black Dove, his final report cleared her of any wrongdoing. Sam tries to reunite with Michael, but is offered a job by Hector Newman (who Sam refused to kill when Hector was still a boy), which he accepts. Helen invites him for Christmas, and he finally meets her family, including her two children with Wallace. He warns her that people like them do not get happy endings. Williams, Eleanor, and Kai-Ming are seen spending Christmas together, while Reed celebrates with an agent of hers – the nanny of Helen's children.

=== Series 2 (2026) ===
No. overall	No. in series	Title	Directed by	Written by	Original release date
7	1	"Black Door"	Julian Farino	Joe Barton	5 November 2026
A week before Wallace Webb becomes Prime Minister, Helen travels to Paris with a young Black Dove agent, Laila Joshi, to steal files relating to a mysterious operation known as Wildflower from the hotel suite of Russian oligarch Alexi Chernov and his wife Katia. Helen successfully retrieves the files and delivers them to Reed, who appears disturbed by their contents. Shortly afterwards, Reed disappears. Meanwhile, Sam is arrested following an assassination but is approached in custody by a mysterious man named Patrick, who offers to secure his release in exchange for killing four targets on behalf of a private organisation. Wallace becomes Prime Minister and the Webbs move into Downing Street. When Reed fails to appear for a scheduled meeting, Helen begins investigating her disappearance. She is summoned by the Black Doves' senior management, where Robert Conteh informs her that the Paris operation was unauthorised and appoints himself as her new handler. Helen secretly copies information from Conteh's computer and discovers that Ida Povetkin, the murdered Chernov housekeeper, was a Black Dove, as is Sam's first target, Erik Klein. She attempts to warn Sam, but he kills Erik before receiving her message.
8	2	"Put Your Head On My Shoulder"	Julian Farino	Joe Barton	5 November 2026
Sam discovers that the man he killed, Erik Klein, was a fellow Black Dove. He and Helen follow a luggage receipt to a storage facility at King's Cross, where they retrieve a recording made by Ida shortly before her death. The recording reveals that Ida had been investigating an earlier Black Doves operation in Berlin and had passed information about it to Reed before her cover was compromised. Helen and Sam begin investigating who is targeting former Black Dove agents. Helen reconnects with Laila, who reveals that she was removed from active duty six months earlier. The pair are subsequently attacked by armed men attempting to abduct Laila, but escape through an art gallery. Meanwhile, Sam receives another assassination assignment and tracks down a former Black Dove agent known as Spitfire, who reveals that the Berlin operation involved an opportunity to become savage. She attempts to shoot Sam but is killed. Helen discovers evidence that Reed is being held by the Black Doves themselves. Sam subsequently learns that Patrick works for an organisation called Kestrel, which has been manipulating him through blackmail. Patrick reveals footage of Helen committing a murder and orders Sam to kill Jerry, a hotel concierge with whom he has begun developing a romantic relationship. Fearing that the footage will expose Helen, Sam reluctantly carries out the assassination.
9	3	"P is for Poison"	Julian Farino	Emer Kenny & Joe Barton	5 November 2026
Following Jerry's murder, Sam struggles with guilt and seeks refuge at Lenny Lines' home. Helen, meanwhile, breaks into Dani's apartment and coerces her into helping access the Black Doves' archives to find information about Wildflower. Their search is interrupted by Conteh, but Helen manages to divert his attention towards one of Reed's dead drops. She recruits Laila to capture a Black Doves operative and interrogate him for information about Reed's whereabouts. Meanwhile, Patrick gives Sam another assassination assignment: Alexi Chernov. Helen arranges a dinner at the Chancellor Club between Wallace, Alexi and Katia, hoping to obtain information about the Chernovs' connections to the Berlin operation. Sam and Eleanor infiltrate the restaurant disguised as staff, and Sam poisons Alexi's soup. When Wallace unexpectedly orders the same dish, Eleanor creates a diversion to switch the meals and prevent the Prime Minister from being poisoned. During dinner, Helen confronts Katia about Ida's murder and Alexi's past as a KGB officer. Alexi subsequently dies from the poison. Meanwhile, MI5 officer Jim Perryman questions Helen about her supposed family history and a woman named Bonnie Weir, raising doubts about her true identity. Laila eventually discovers where Reed is being held, but Conteh orders assassinations against both her and Sam. Sam receives his next assignment from Kestrel: to assassinate Reed.
10	4	"The Opportunity to Become Savage"	Julian Farino	Joe Barton	5 November 2026
In 1988, Elizabeth Reed is working undercover in East Berlin, infiltrating an extremist organisation known as Kestrel. Living with its member Franz and their young daughter Vita, Reed is also having an affair with her Black Doves superior, Peter Maddison. Kestrel is assisting former KGB officer Alexi Chernov with plans to defect to the United States, an operation the Black Doves are monitoring. Wanting to leave Berlin with her daughter, Reed fabricates intelligence about a planned bombing, prompting the Black Doves to order the elimination of the entire Kestrel network. When Franz returns to rescue Reed and Vita, she reveals her true identity to him. Franz appears to be killed during the ensuing violence, while Peter discovers Reed's deception and attempts to strangle her. Reed shoots Peter in self-defence, but Vita disappears during the chaos. Reed subsequently conceals the truth about the operation from her organisation. In the present, Laila survives an assassination attempt, while Williams and Eleanor find themselves caught in a dangerous confrontation after accepting a contract connected to her. Sam is shown living in Italy, where he has begun forming a relationship with a local bar owner, before Reed approaches him with another assignment. Meanwhile, flashbacks reveal that Helen was once ordered by Reed to assassinate Franz, who had survived the events in Berlin and grown old in Dorset. Helen carries out the killing while on a countryside holiday with Wallace and their children. Before dying, Franz reveals that he had found Vita. It is also established that the footage of Helen's assassination of Franz is the material Kestrel has been using to blackmail Sam.
11	5	"Murder Mix"	Kieron Hawkes	Joe Barton	5 November 2026
Helen, Sam, Williams and Eleanor travel to the Black Doves' secure facility to rescue Reed, who is being held prisoner by the organisation. During the journey, the group argues over the music, eventually settling on Williams' murder playlist. Meanwhile, Wallace is informed that Alexi Chernov was poisoned during his dinner with the Prime Minister, and investigators discover that two restaurant employees were restrained and their uniforms stolen. At the facility, the rescue operation develops into a prolonged gunfight as Conteh dispatches additional personnel to stop the intruders. During the confrontation, Sam and Helen argue about the consequences of their increasingly violent lives. Williams and Eleanor also struggle with their conflicting feelings after accepting a contract to kill Sam. They eventually express their feelings for one another and kiss. The group successfully reaches Reed, who denies responsibility for the recent killings of Black Doves agents and claims that she has been framed. She explains that Ida was investigating Wildflower and reveals the truth about her 1988 operation in Berlin, including her relationship with Franz and their daughter Vita. Reed also reveals that Franz survived and subsequently rebuilt Kestrel, intending for Vita to inherit control of the organisation. Laila arrives in a van and helps the group escape. Back in London, Perryman informs Wallace that Helen's real name is Lily Morris and that her supposed family history is largely fabricated. Wallace begins to question his wife's identity and past.
12	6	"Peace Summit"	Kieron Hawkes	Joe Barton	5 November 2026
On the morning of Wallace's international peace summit, Sam meets Patrick, who confirms that his assassination contract has been completed and offers him permanent employment with Kestrel. Sam refuses and threatens to kill Patrick if they meet again. After attending Jerry's funeral, Sam is approached by Laila, who suspects that he knows Reed's whereabouts. Meanwhile, flashbacks reveal that Dani has been recruited by Kestrel and has been providing information about the Black Doves. She sabotages the organisation's computer systems, allowing Kestrel to launch an attack on its headquarters. As the peace summit approaches, Kestrel operatives abduct American defence envoy Cecile Mason and Katia Chernov. At Black Doves headquarters, the organisation's true leader is revealed to be Katia, who is actually Vita, Reed's daughter. Having been abandoned in a Soviet orphanage following the events in Berlin, Vita has spent decades plotting revenge against the Black Doves and her mother. She intends to destroy the organisation by forcing Helen to assassinate Wallace during the summit, exposing her as a Black Dove and implicating the organisation in the Prime Minister's murder. Helen receives an ultimatum through an earpiece: kill Wallace or her children will be murdered by Marie, their nanny, who is revealed to be working for Kestrel. Meanwhile, Wallace confronts Helen about her identity as Lily Morris, forcing her to acknowledge that she has been concealing her past. Helen manages to warn Sam of her predicament and, rather than shooting Wallace, fires into the car window to create an opportunity for their escape. Laila, Williams and Eleanor launch an assault on Kestrel's forces at the Black Doves headquarters. During the fighting, Dani is killed by a grenade, while Vita fatally shoots Cecile. Reed confronts her daughter, and the two share an emotional farewell before Vita dies from her injuries. Helen and Sam travel to London Zoo, where they rescue her children and Helen kills Marie. Wallace subsequently lies to MI5 to protect Helen, although his suspicions about her identity remain. The Black Doves survive the attack but suffer substantial casualties, while several Kestrel operatives escape. Sam decides to leave London and return to Italy, while Helen seeks a promotion within the organisation, asking Reed to become her partner rather than her handler. Patrick later approaches Helen and leaves her a Kestrel calling card, suggesting that Kestrel remains active. In the final scene, Wallace confronts Helen at home and asks her to begin by telling him her real name.

== Production ==
The project was announced by Netflix in April 2023. Barton also produces through Noisy Bear, alongside production company Sister.

Filming began in London in October 2023. That month, Sarah Lancashire and Ben Whishaw were added to the cast, along with Andrew Buchan, Omari Douglas, Andrew Koji, Kathryn Hunter, Sam Troughton, Ella Lily Hyland, Adam Silver, Ken Nwosu and Gabrielle Creevy. In March 2024, Adeel Akhtar, Tracey Ullman, Finn Bennett and Luther Ford were added to the cast. In August 2024, ahead of its première, Netflix renewed the show for a second series.

Barton derived the series name from the Black Dove, his local pub in Brighton.

Filming for series 2 started in London by November 2025, with announcements that Neve Campbell, Ambika Mod, Babou Ceesay and Sam Riley had been added to the cast.

== Release ==
The series premiered on Netflix on 5 December 2024. The second series premiered on 5 November 2026.

== Reception ==
=== Critical response ===
==== Series 1 ====
On the review aggregator Rotten Tomatoes, the first series holds an approval rating of 92% based on 71 reviews, with an average rating of 7.5/10. The website's consensus reads: "Black Doves hits its target dead on." Metacritic, which uses a weighted average, assigned the series a score of 78 out of 100, based on 31 critics, indicating "generally favorable" reviews.

Writing in The Guardian, Rebecca Nicholson described the series as "gleefully pulpy" and was mildly critical of Knightley and Whishaw's portrayals, but praised cameo appearances by numerous well-known actors in supporting roles. In Digital Spy, David Opie singled out the on-screen depiction of Sam having gay sex in the first episode, stating that the series "ventures where James Bond would never dare go".

==== Series 2 ====
On the review aggregator Rotten Tomatoes, the second series holds an approval rating of 97% based on 29 reviews, with an average rating of 8.1/10. The critical consensus reads: "Black Doves takes flight once more in this fun-fueled second season where Keira Knightley and Ben Whishaw reign in the proceedings with verifiably pristine performances." Metacritic, which uses a weighted average, assigned the film a score of 83 out of 100, based on 15 critics, indicating "universal acclaim".

=== Accolades ===
Award	Date of ceremony	Category	Nominee(s)	Result	Ref.
Golden Globe Awards	January 5, 2025	Best Actress – Television Series Drama	Keira Knightley	Nominated	
Critics' Choice Awards	February 7, 2025	Best Actress in a Drama Series	Keira Knightley	Nominated	
Royal Television Society Programme Awards	March 25, 2025	Leading Actor – Male	Ben Whishaw	Nominated	
GLAAD Media Awards	March 27, 2025	Outstanding New TV Series	Black Doves	Nominated	
Gotham TV Awards	June 2, 2025	Breakthrough Drama Series	Joe Barton, Jane Featherstone, Chris Fry, Keira Knightley	Nominated	
Gotham TV Awards	June 2, 2025	Outstanding Supporting Performance in a Drama Series	Ben Whishaw	Won	
