= Landscapers (TV series) =

2021 true crime dark comedy drama

- Genre: True crime; Black comedy drama
- Created by: Ed Sinclair
- Written by: Ed Sinclair; Will Sharpe
- Directed by: Will Sharpe
- Starring: Olivia Colman; David Thewlis
- Composer: Arthur Sharpe
- Countries of origin: United States; United Kingdom
- Original language: English
- No. of episodes: 4

Production
- Executive producers: Olivia Colman; Jane Featherstone; Chris Fry; Ed Sinclair; Will Sharpe
- Producer: Katie Carpenter
- Cinematography: Erik Wilson
- Production companies: Sister; Sky Studios; South of the River Pictures

Original release
- Network: HBO (US); Sky Atlantic (UK)
- Release: 6 December – 27 December 2021

Landscapers is a 2021 British/American true crime television drama created and written by Ed Sinclair and directed as a black comedy by Will Sharpe. The series is based on the true story of the 1998 murders of William and Patricia Wycherley and stars Olivia Colman and David Thewlis as Susan and Christopher Edwards, the couple behind the murders, as their decade-old crimes are uncovered in 2012.

== Premise ==
Inspired by real events, Landscapers tells the story of mild-mannered Susan and her husband and how they came to kill Susan's parents and bury them in the back garden of their Mansfield home, in a crime that remained undiscovered for over a decade.

== Cast and characters ==
- Olivia Colman as Susan Edwards
- David Thewlis as Christopher Edwards
- Kate O'Flynn as DC Emma Lancing
- Dipo Ola as Douglas Hylton
- Daniel Rigby as DCI Tony Collier
- Samuel Anderson as DC Paul Wilkie
- Felicity Montagu as Patricia Wycherley
- David Hayman as William Wycherley
- Kathryn Hunter as Tabitha Edwards

== Episodes ==
No.	Title	Directed by	Written by	Original release date	U.S. viewers (millions)
1	"Episode 1"	Will Sharpe	Ed Sinclair	6 December 2021	0.112
After living in France with his wife Susan for the last 15 years, Christopher Edwards places a desperate call to his stepmother back in England for financial help. But when she relays the details of their conversation to the police, a resulting double homicide investigation quickly builds steam and the couple's carefully reconstructed lives are suddenly placed at risk.
2	"Episode 2"	Will Sharpe	Ed Sinclair	13 December 2021	0.128
Shortly after turning themselves over to the Nottinghamshire Police, Susan and Christopher are thrown into separate holding cells, where their statements are picked apart by detectives Emma Lancing and Paul Wilkie. As the past comes back to haunt her, disconcerting details from Chris' interview make their way to Susan and a painful secret is revealed.
3	"Episode 3"	Will Sharpe	Ed Sinclair and Will Sharpe	20 December 2021	0.146
As they narrow in on the likeliest scenarios from that tragic night, Lancing and Wilkie's focus shifts to Christopher's past. While they exploit his recurring tendency to go too far for those he loves, the couple's relationship with Susan's parents comes under the spotlight. Then, Lancing and Wilkie have a breakthrough that calls the couple's shared reality into question.
4	"Episode 4"	Will Sharpe	Ed Sinclair and Will Sharpe	27 December 2021	0.187
With their trial underway, Susan and Christopher each take the stand for a final chance to prove their version of that fatal night in the Wycherley home. Truth and fantasy clash as old doubts and new regrets test the limits of their love, before the couple faces their greatest threat yet: the imminent possibility of being separated forever.

== Production ==
In December 2019, HBO and Sky announced they had given a series order to Landscapers, a true-crime miniseries written by Ed Sinclair and originally intended to be directed and executive produced by Alexander Payne, with Olivia Colman attached to star; Sinclair had created and wrote the series with Colman in mind for the part of Susan Edwards.

In October 2020, Alexander Payne exited the project due to scheduling conflicts and was replaced by Will Sharpe. David Thewlis was cast as Christopher Edwards in March 2021. Principal photography for the series began in March 2021 in Mansfield, Nottinghamshire.

The series features a flashback scene; although both Colman and Thewlis are intended to be much younger in the scene, no visual effects or specific makeup were used, with Thewlis commenting "We just put wigs on."

Both Colman and Thewlis stated that they did not doubt the culpability of the Edwards in the murder, but that the series was intended to create empathy and an understanding for the couple, with Thewlis stating "what we're asking the audience to decide is not whether they're guilty, because they clearly are, but whether they deserve sympathy" and Colman stating "you do find yourself going, 'God, I wonder, had I had that set of circumstances, what would I do? They're gentle, meek people. What on earth made them do it?"

== Release ==
The series was broadcast from 6 December to 27 December 2021.

== Reception ==
The series received positive reviews upon its release, particularly for the two leads performances. On Rotten Tomatoes, it has an overall approval rating of 98% with an average score of 8.10/10 based on 46 reviews. The site's critical consensus reads: "Landscapers layers enigmatic style onto an already unbelievable true story with varying results, but Olivia Colman and David Thewlis ground the absurdity with outstanding performances". On Metacritic, which uses a weighted average, the series has a score of 79 based on 22 reviews indicating 'Generally favourable reviews'.
