= This Is Going to Hurt (TV series) =

2022 British medical comedy-drama miniseries

- Title card
- Genre: Medical drama Comedy drama Black comedy
- Based on: This Is Going to Hurt by Adam Kay
- Written by: Adam Kay
- Directed by: Lucy Forbes; Tom Kingsley
- Starring: Ben Whishaw; Ambika Mod; Alex Jennings; Michele Austin; Rory Fleck Byrne; Ashley McGuire; Kadiff Kirwan
- Country of origin: United Kingdom
- Original language: English
- No. of series: 1
- No. of episodes: 7

Production
- Executive producers: Adam Kay; Naomi de Pear; Jane Featherstone; James Farrell; Mona Qureshi; Kristin Jones; Dan McDermott; Ben Whishaw
- Producer: Holly Pullinger
- Running time: 45 mins
- Production companies: Sister; Terrible Productions; AMC Studios

Original release
- Network: BBC One
- Release: 8 February – 22 March 2022

This Is Going to Hurt is a British medical comedy-drama television miniseries, created by Adam Kay and based on his memoir of the same name. The show was co-produced by the BBC and AMC. It focuses on the lives of a group of junior doctors working on an obstetrics and gynaecology ward in a National Health Service hospital. It profiles their professional and personal lives and explores the emotional effects of working in a stressful work environment. The series closely follows the stories of Adam Kay (Ben Whishaw) and Shruti Acharya (Ambika Mod) as they work through the ranks of hospital hierarchy. These characters both break the fourth wall and directly address viewers with dialogue. This Is Going to Hurt presents its stories with comedic and dramatic tones. The seven-part series premiered on BBC One and BBC iPlayer on 8 February 2022. It began airing on AMC+ in the United States on 2 June 2022.

== Premise ==
The series is a fictional adaptation of Adam Kay's book This Is Going To Hurt. Set in London during 2006, it focuses on a group of junior doctors working on a busy obstetrics and gynaecology ward located in an NHS hospital. It has frank honesty in the depiction of working in obstetrics and gynaecology. It fully explores the emotional effects working in a hospital environment has on its staff. It explores the lack of support for junior doctors and how their achievements are unsung. The personal lives of the junior doctors are also explored throughout the episodes.

== Cast and characters ==
- Ben Whishaw as Adam Kay
- Ambika Mod as Shruti Acharya
- Alex Jennings as Nigel Lockhart
- Michele Austin as Tracy
- Rory Fleck Byrne as Harry Muir
- Ashley McGuire as Vicky Houghton
- Kadiff Kirwan as Julian
- Harriet Walter as Veronique
- Josie Walker as Non-Reassuring Trace
- Philippa Dunne as Ria
- Michael Workeye as Ben
- Tom Durant-Pritchard as Greg
- Alice Orr-Ewing as Emma
- Hannah Onslow as Erika Van Hegen
- Rosie Akerman as Paula Van Hegen
- George Somner as Al
- Agata Jarosz as Agnieska
- Yasmin Wilde as Benilda
- James Corrigan as Welly
- Sophie Winkleman as Kathleen Mullender
- The Vivienne as The Drag Queen

== Episodes ==
No.	Title	Directed by	Written by	Original release date	U.K. viewers (millions)
1	"Episode 1"	Lucy Forbes	Adam Kay	8 February 2022	6.10
Adam Kay is a doctor working in a labour ward, having slept in his car in the carpark but is late for work. His boss, Mr Lockhart, is not impressed and Tracy, the head midwife, watches over him. His next patient is racist and Adam threatens to kick her out despite her being pregnant. Adam struggles with his personal and professional life; he is best man at his friend Greg's wedding and is struggling to keep his relationship with his boyfriend, Harry, secret from his mother. Adam meets a trainee doctor, Shruti, and helps her deliver her first baby although the patient (the same from earlier) starts shouting racial abuse at her; as an act of subtle revenge, Adam stitches her caesarean section incision so as to misalign her dolphin tattoo. After an exhausted Adam finally makes it to Greg's stag do, he volunteers to take the night shift. At the shift, Adam discovers that a patient, Erika, who he had sent home as he was tired and found her irritating, is in danger, and he has to do an emergency caesarean. Lockhart is forced to take over from him and Erika recovers. Adam finally arrives again at the stag do at a club where he collapses asleep on a sofa.
2	"Episode 2"	Lucy Forbes	Adam Kay	15 February 2022	5.02
Adam is affected by the mistake, and during another caesarean they lose some swabs until Tracy manages to save them by turning up with the baby and the swabs. Adam struggles to sleep and finds it difficult at work. Although Lockhart wants to send a patient home that Adam believes is in trouble, Adam lets her stay the night. Meanwhile, Shruti becomes more stressed at work and covers for Adam. At dinner with Emma and Greg, Adam supposedly accidentally tells them the sex of the baby, but later reveals it was intentional. The patient who Adam had let stay the night is sent home and he is told off for disobeying orders. Shortly after, Adam smokes outside and spots the patient in discomfort. He brings her back in, managing to save her and is praised by Lockhart. Erika files a complaint against Adam, causing more stress. When Harry attempts to get him to open up, Adam impulsively asks him to marry him, to which Harry says “No.”
3	"Episode 3"	Lucy Forbes	Adam Kay	22 February 2022	4.40
Adam shows up late to the hospital due to struggling with Harry after revealing their relationship to his mother. Shruti is asked out for pizza by Ben, but they soon receive the news that they are having a ministerial visit for which the hospital is not ready. Adam helps a patient, Mrs Winnicka, who has a prolapse. Stickers on the hospital notes of a patient, Anna, are a warning of domestic abuse but she tells them that her son just loves stickers. Shruti does not believe her and finds out that her partner, Angus, has been abusive ever since Anna was pregnant, the result of work stress according to Anna. Tracy pulls an emergency cord, but accidentally pulls some of the roof down; it turns out Adam asked one of the workmen to help and he has brought the roof down. While this is going on, Adam heads out for dinner with his rude mother. Eventually Adam blurts out that he and Harry are engaged as a way to finally let his mother see sense. The next day, Adam's mother rings and congratulates Harry, who is not happy about this. Adam insists that it is the only way to be taken seriously. Adam ends up covered in blood during an operation and breaks down after hearing Mrs Winnicka has died. Angus arrives and Shruti manages to stop the situation from escalating before hospital security arrives. Anna does not press charges and Shruti, overwhelmed and stressed, cancels her date with Ben. Adam and Harry go to Mrs Winnicka's funeral where Harry decides they should get married.
4	"Episode 4"	Lucy Forbes	Adam Kay	28 February 2022	4.23
Lockhart ultimately decides not to take the blame for Adam's issue regarding Erika, but Adam has already submitted his report saying Lockhart agreed to send Erika home. Shruti, now in a difficult position, breaks down in the bathroom on the phone with her mother. Adam refuses to withdraw his report, risking his and Shruti's jobs. Following a joke in poor taste, difficult consultant Houghton forces Adam down to A&E – leaving Shruti to deliver triplets. Adam sneaks into Erika's room to try and convince her to drop the complaint; after Erika's sister arrives, Adam surmises that it was her, not Erika, who filed the case. Shruti successfully delivers the triplets as another patient shows up needing an emergency birth. Adam delivers the baby, still haunted by memories of Erika; after witnessing Adam saving the mother, Erika's sister decides to drop the case. Harry and Adam exchange rings. Shruti has dinner with Vicky, who warns her the job is very stressful.
5	"Episode 5"	Tom Kingsley	Adam Kay	8 March 2022	4.16
Shruti is growing more frustrated with juggling her studying, job and personal life and begins lashing out at others. Adam is worrying about the complaint as even though Erika's has been withdrawn an anonymous one has turned up; he discovers it was filed by a colleague. Adam attempts to invite people to his engagement party; surprisingly, Julian, one of his colleagues, agrees to come. The hospital becomes overwhelmed with patients; whilst a stressed Shruti manages to gently let down a couple who had long struggled with infertility and failed IVF treatment that they are unlikely to have children, she distresses another couple having telling them that they lost their baby and describing it as just a bunch of cells, with Vicky covering for Shruti for the latter. At the engagement party, Shruti mentions the anonymous complaint which Adam accuses her of filing and shouts about how she is a terrible doctor and person, Tracy admits she had filed the complaint and Adam runs out. A drunk Shruti reveals everything to Harry whilst Tracy calls Adam out for all of the things he had done – disconnecting the alarm, the tattoo and bullying Erika. Harry and Adam's relationship hangs in the balance.
6	"Episode 6"	Tom Kingsley	Adam Kay	15 March 2022	4.42
Shruti bumps into the father of the triplets she delivered at the supermarket; upset she can never escape from work, she eventually abandons her trolley and runs home. During a later conversation with her parents, she lies and says she has not received her exam results. Adam is staying with Greg and Emma as well as getting a locum shift at a private hospital, much posher and richer than his NHS job. Shruti and a trainee Al are the only people on call, and Shruti is forced to work on her own after Al faints at the sight of blood. Shruti grows increasingly stressed and impatient with all of the unhappy patients. A patient tells Shruti she is a good doctor, but it does not lighten her mood. Shruti is forced to do an emergency surgery on her own whilst Al phones for help; she panics and is scared that she will kill the patient. Adam starts delivering the baby Kathleen, but it goes wrong and the private hospital is not equipped for the emergency. Kathleen turns up at Shruti's hospital for help. Shruti avoids Adam under the pretences she is tired; for the first time she turns and addresses the camera, apologising. The next day, Adam shows up at work to find it in a mess and everyone distraught. Shruti has died by suicide.
7	"Episode 7"	Tom Kingsley	Adam Kay	22 March 2022	4.13
Two months after Shruti's death, the labour ward is packed and Adam is still haunted by Shruti's memory. At her memorial, they plant an oak tree and Vicky talks about Shruti's depression – revealing that she passed her exams – whilst Adam wants an investigation into the hospital's conditions. Lockhart tries to convince Adam to blame Shruti for the mistake in order to remain a doctor. Adam turns up at his tribunal and manages to keep his job. Adam meets with Harry and invites him as his date to Greg and Emma's wedding. Erika gifts Adam a mug with the inscription "World's Best Doctor", but she has one for Shruti, too; before he can explain her suicide, he is called to an emergency. After saving the patient, he sees Al sobbing in the changing room and, remembering Shruti, comforts him as well as giving him the afternoon off. Harry shows up at the wedding where Adam reveals the truth; he honoured her by talking about how common suicide is among medical professionals. Harry and Adam are not sure where their relationship stands currently, leaving it ambiguous. As the episode ends, Adam arrives in the same hospital carpark where he slept at the beginning of Episode 1; standing in the payment queue, he spots a woman in labour in the back of a nearby car. He rushes to her and delivers her baby there, before returning to his car to find a penalty notice on the windscreen.

== Production ==
=== Development ===
In September 2017, it was announced that Sister Pictures had acquired television rights to This Is Going to Hurt by Adam Kay, with Kay serving as writer and executive producer. They acquired the rights following a twelve-way auction. Alongside Kay, Naomi de Pear and Katie Carpenter were appointed developers and executive producers of the series. At the time, de Pear expressed her desire to create the series because "the NHS is a magnificent beast and it's imperative that this story be told now." In June 2018, it was announced that BBC controller of drama Piers Wenger commissioned the series for an eight-episode order for BBC Two, with AMC co-producing the series. Seven episodes were subsequently produced. Production companies involved in the series include Sister (a global company established October 2019, absorbing Sister Pictures), Terrible Productions, BBC Studios and AMC Studios, with BBC Studios handling international distribution. Lucy Forbes serves as the director for episodes 1 to 4 and Tom Kingsley directed episodes 5 to 7. Mona Qureshi was appointed as an executive producer from the BBC. Other executive producers included Jane Featherstone, James Farrell, Kristin Jones and AMC Studio's co-president Dan McDermott.

=== Soundtrack ===
This Is Going to Hurt (Original Soundtrack)

Soundtrack album by Jarv Is
- Released: March 21, 2022
- Label: Rough Trade

Jarv Is chronology
Remix Ed (2021)	This Is Going to Hurt (Original Soundtrack) (2022)

The show's soundtrack was composed by Jarvis Cocker led band Jarv Is, who described it as "our love song to the NHS". Each episode of the show features at least one song with lyrics by Cocker. A full soundtrack album was released digitally in March 2022 by the band Jarv Is under the Rough Trade Records label. The vinyl edition of the album was released in October 2022.

=== Casting ===
In June 2020, Ben Whishaw joined the cast in the lead role of Adam Kay. Whishaw's casting was met with unanimous approval from the networks involved in the project. Controller of BBC Drama, Wenger said it was "a testament to the quality" of scripts that Whishaw had signed up. McDermott, co-president of AMC Studios was "thrilled" to secure an "established talent". Early on, Ambika Mod had signed up to play Shruti Acharya, a junior doctor (SHO) in obstetrics and gynaecology. Mod received the first scripts for the role in mid-2020. She recalled that upon reading through the first episode, Mod felt as though the role was "meant" for her. In June 2021, the casting details of the remainder of main roles in the series were announced. These castings consisted of hospital staff and Adam's personal relations. Michele Austin was cast as a sharp-witted midwife called Tracy, Kadiff Kirwan plays Julian who is Adam's rival colleague, Ashley McGuire appears as consultant Vicky Houghton and Alex Jennings as consultant Nigel Lockhart who is Adam's boss. The casting of Adam's relatives included his boyfriend Harry Muir played by Rory Fleck Byrne, Harriet Walter as Adam's mother Veronique and Tom Durant-Pritchard as his best friend Greg.

In September 2021, Michael Workeye revealed he had filmed a role in the series. He stated that working with Whishaw and Kay was a "dream". In November 2021, Josie Walker publicly revealed her involvement in the series, playing Non-Reassuring Trace. Other castings included James Corrigan as Welly and Alice Orr-Ewing as Emma. In one episode, British drag queen The Vivienne makes a cameo appearance working as a nightclub bouncer.

=== Filming ===
Principal photography began by February 2021 and wrapped in June. In various scenes, the characters Adam and Shruti both break the fourth wall and directly address viewers with dialogue. Exterior shots of the hospital were filmed at Ealing Hospital.

== Broadcast ==
In December 2021, it was announced that the BBC had decided to broadcast the series on BBC One instead of BBC Two. The show premiered on BBC One in the UK on 8 February 2022, with each episode being 45 minutes.

It began airing on AMC+ in the United States on 2 June 2022.

== Reception ==
=== Critical response ===
The series was met with widespread acclaim by critics, with review aggregator Rotten Tomatoes reporting 95% approval over 43 reviews with an average rating of 9/10. The website's critics consensus reads, "Ben Whishaw's live-wire performance of an exhausted doctor powers This is Going to Hurt, a smart drama full of humor and pain." Metacritic, which uses a weighted average, assigned a score of 91 out of 100 based on 20 critics, indicating "universal acclaim".

The Radio Times rated the opening episode 5/5 stars, with Lauren Morris writing "the comedy drama impresses with its strong cast, bolstered by the show's soundtrack of mid-noughties earworms", while Lucy Mangan for The Guardian, rating the first episode 4/5 stars, wrote that it "pulls no punches in portraying the difficulties of life as a junior medic". However, Rachel Cooke of the New Statesman found "unlikability" of the characters to be a "problem".

Ed Cumming for The Independent praised the "good sense" casting of Whishaw in the main role. Cumming thought it was unlike other medical dramas, such as Holby City. He believed they shared the same principles, being that "in TV and in life: the stakes are always high in a hospital". Katie Rosseinsky writing for the Evening Standard liked the "nostalgia in the show’s mid-Noughties backdrop". She also praised Whishaw; noting that the rate of drama is chaotic but Whishaw is "such an engaging performer that the whole thing feels effortlessly authentic". She added that while Whishaw is "the anchor in the whirlwind of the ward" the show has a "similarly impressive" ensemble cast. Rosseinsky praised Mod for her "standout in her first major TV role" and added that Kadiff Kirwan "is enjoyably superior as Adam’s peer Julian". The critic concluded that the show is "a deeply nuanced tribute that’s by turns horribly funny, heartbreakingly sad and righteously angry". Jack King from GQ branded Shruti's story as the show's "most compelling, heart-wrenching subplots". He praised Mod's performance and called her "2022's first bona fide breakout".

Juliet Pearce, director of nursing midwifery at the Isle of Wight NHS Trust, praised the show. She described it as "hilarious and heart-breaking" and a "reminder of the human emotions behind every tired, scared and fallible healthcare professional". Jess Phillips, Labour MP for Birmingham Yardley, praised the series for highlighting the pressures of working in the NHS.

Some viewers considered the series to be an accurate depiction of life on a maternity ward, but others saw it as misogynistic. Harriet Sherwood for The Guardian reported that some viewers accused the series of depicting birth as traumatic, and women as disempowered, dysfunctional and reduced to "slabs of meat". Milli Hill, author of The Positive Birth Book, and proponent of “alternate” birthing methods, accused Adam Kay and the creators of the show of sexism. Hill criticised the show for misogyny. Some pregnant women reported on social media that they had been advised to avoid watching the show by their midwives.

=== Viewing figures ===
The first episode was watched 4,753,000 times on iPlayer alone during 2022, making it the 10th most viewed individual programme on the platform that year.

=== Awards and nominations ===
Year	Award	Category	Nominee(s)	Result	Ref.
2022	Gotham Awards	Breakthrough Series – Long Form	This is Going to Hurt	Nominated	
2022	Gotham Awards	Outstanding Performance in a New Series	Ben Whishaw	Won	
2022	National Television Awards	Best New Drama	This is Going to Hurt	Nominated	
2022	Rose d'Or Awards	Drama	This is Going to Hurt	Nominated	
2022	Royal Television Society Craft & Design Awards	Director – Drama	Lucy Forbes	Won	
2022	Royal Television Society Craft & Design Awards	Sound – Drama	Steve Browell, Nina Rice, Jamie Selway, Adam Horley	Won	
2022	Satellite Awards	Best Miniseries & Limited Series	This is Going to Hurt	Nominated	
2022	TV Choice Awards	Best New Drama	This is Going to Hurt	Nominated	
2022	TV Choice Awards	Best Actor	Ben Whishaw	Nominated	
2022	Venice TV Awards	Best TV Film	This Is Going to Hurt	Nominated	
2023	British Academy Television Awards	Best Mini-Series	Adam Kay, Jane Featherstone, Naomi de Pear, James Farrell, Holly Pullinger, Lucy Forbes	Nominated	
2023	British Academy Television Awards	Best Actor	Ben Whishaw	Won	
2023	British Academy Television Craft Awards	Best Director: Fiction	Lucy Forbes	Nominated	
2023	British Academy Television Craft Awards	Best Writer: Drama	Adam Kay	Won	
2023	British Academy Television Craft Awards	Best Scripted Casting	Nina Gold, Martin Ware	Won	
2023	British Academy Television Craft Awards	Best Editing: Fiction	Selina MacArthur	Won	
2023	Critics' Choice Awards	Best Limited Series	This is Going to Hurt	Nominated	
2023	Critics' Choice Awards	Best Actor in a Limited Series or Movie Made for Television	Ben Whishaw	Nominated	
2023	Independent Spirit Awards	Best Lead Performance in a New Scripted Series	Ben Whishaw	Nominated	
2023	Royal Television Society Programme Awards	Supporting Actor – Female	Ambika Mod	Won	
