= Catawba College =

Private college in Salisbury, North Carolina, U.S.

Coordinates: 35.6914°N 80.4844°W

- Motto: Sit Lux
- Type: Private college
- Established: 1851; 175 years ago
- Religious affiliation: United Church of Christ
- Endowment: $580,000,000
- President: David Nelson
- Faculty: 78 full time, 20 part time (fall 2023)
- Students: 1,241 (fall 2023)
- Undergraduates: 1,153 (fall 2023)
- Postgraduates: 88 (fall 2023)
- Location: Salisbury, North Carolina, United States
- Colors: Catawba blue and white
- Nickname: Catawba Indians
- Sporting affiliations: NCAA Division II, South Atlantic Conference
- Mascot: Blue
- Website: www.catawba.edu

Catawba College is a private college in Salisbury, North Carolina. Founded in 1851 by the North Carolina Classis of the Reformed Church in Newton, the college adopted its name from its county of origin, Catawba County, before moving to its current home of Salisbury in 1925. Catawba College still holds loose ties with the successor to the Reformed Church, the United Church of Christ. It offers over 70 undergraduate degrees. As of August 2024, Catawba has an endowment over $580 million.

== History ==
Catawba College was founded by the North Carolina Classis of the Reformed Church in the United States in 1851. The years following the opening of the college were years of growing prosperity for the school, but the Civil War changed this as funds and students became less available. During the war years, the college became an academy, operating as Catawba High School from 1865 until 1885, whereupon it resumed operations under its original charter as Catawba College. Catawba became coeducational in 1890. Even with the addition of women to the student body, the college struggled to overcome the depletion brought on by the war. Responding to the offer of a partially constructed dormitory-administration building and several acres of land in Salisbury, trustee, college, and church officials closed the campus in Newton in 1923 and re-opened in Salisbury in 1925.

The college is now affiliated with the United Church of Christ, the successor to the Evangelical and Reformed Church, itself the successor to the Reformed Church in the United States.

== Academics ==
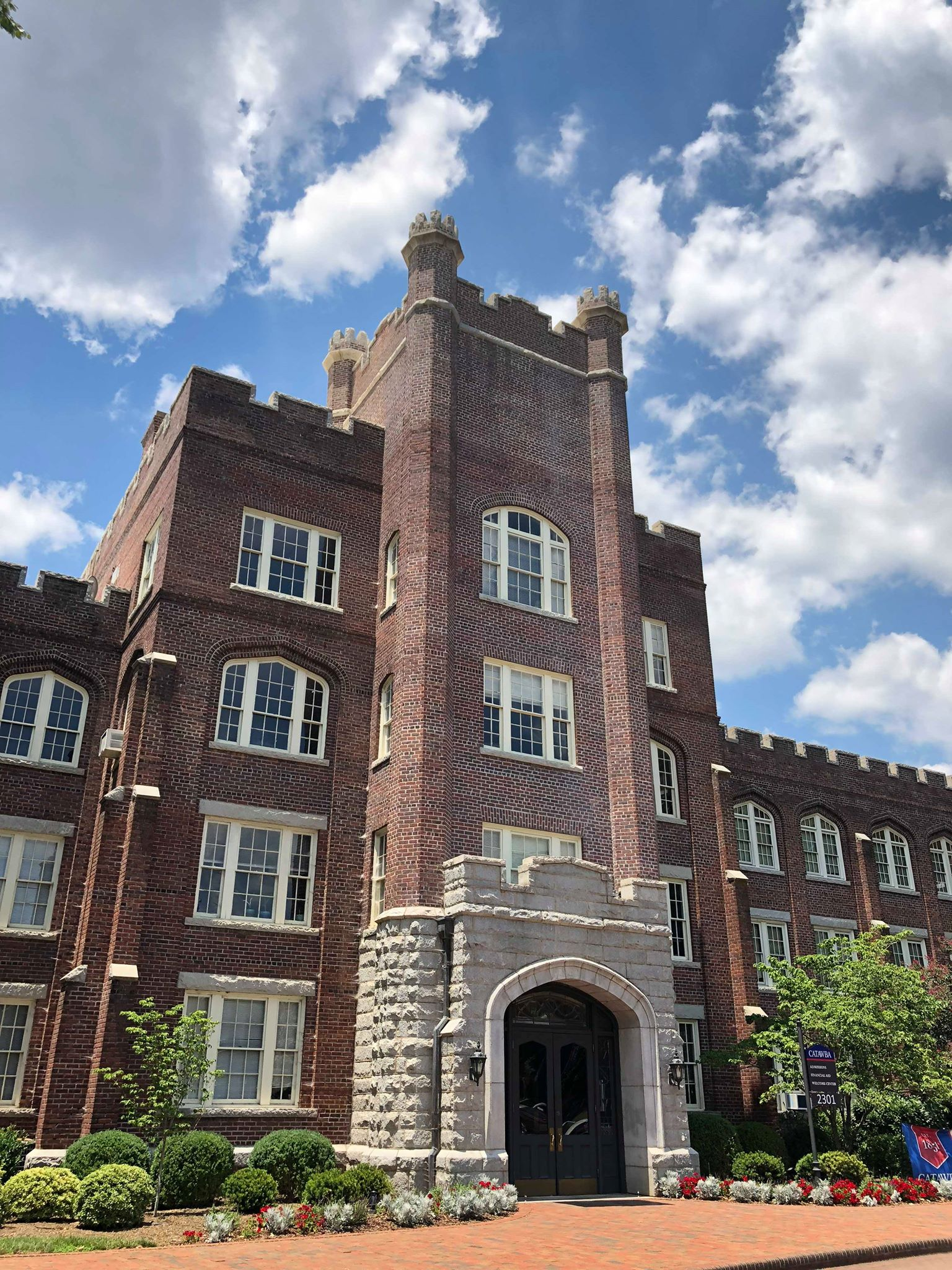
Catawba College

Catawba College offers over 70 fields of study in a variety of disciplines. Special programs and college centers include the Lilly Center for Vocation and Values, the Writing Center, the Math Center, Sustainable Catawba, Volunteer Catawba, the Center for the Environment, Career Services, the Curriculum Materials Center, Summer School, and Winter Term.

For working adults, Catawba's School of Evening and Graduate Studies offers the Bachelor of Business Administration (B.B.A.). In conjunction with the Department of Teacher Education, the Bachelor of Arts in education (B.A.E.) degree may be earned with a major in Birth-Kindergarten Education; at the graduate level, the Master of Education degree in elementary education is also offered. A RN to BSN degree is offered as well as part of the evening program.

Catawba College is ranked by U S News & World Report in Best Colleges as #6 in Regional Colleges South, #22 in Best Value Schools, and #2 in Best Colleges for Veterans, further noting that the college has a student-faculty ratio of 12:1, and has 60.4% of its classes with fewer than 20 students.

=== Honors program ===
Most classes are instructed by more than one professor, each providing input from their specific field of study. The program includes travel abroad opportunities (i.e. Greece, Germany, Britain, Arizona, and more destinations both nationally and internationally). Students can be invited into the program as incoming freshmen, or students can apply any time during their education at Catawba. Incoming freshmen seeking acceptance into the Honors Program must have a 3.5 or higher weighted GPA, 1150 or higher SAT, and/or 25 or higher ACT, score.

=== Ketner School of Business ===
The school of business was named after Ralph W. Ketner, who was the co-founder and former CEO of Food Lion. The school of business provides students with a curriculum in many different areas of the business world. These areas are Accounting, Economics and Finance, Entrepreneurship, Integrated Marketing Communication, Communication Arts with concentrations in communications and sports communications, and Business Administration with concentrations in Accounting, Communications, Economics, General Management, Information Systems, International Business, Marketing, and Entrepreneurship. The school also offers the Center for Entrepreneurship and Experimental Development (CEED) and the Institute of Business and Accounting. Further information on internships, mentoring program, latest news, and scholarships can be found on the business school's website.

=== Shirley Peeler Richie Academy for Teaching ===
Catawba created the West Scholars Program in 2006. The program offers a scholarship for North Carolina residents, in addition to "leadership seminars, community, service, scholarly researched presentations" and various other benefits. Catawba was one of 18 institutions in North Carolina to offer a N.C. Teaching Fellows program. That program was ended by the state legislature in 2011.

=== Center for the Environment ===
The Center for the Environment at Catawba College was established in 1996 to educate the local and campus community about environmental stewardship and sustainability. The center aims to advance sustainable solutions and maintain a leadership role in the region on issues such as air and water quality, land preservation, sustainable development, and solar initiatives. The Center for the Environment houses the Geographic Information Systems and Technology minor at Catawba College. Catawba College achieved full carbon neutrality in 2023, seven years ahead of its 2030 commitment.

The facility that houses the center opened in 2001, hailed by the top state environmental official as "the wave of the future in resource and energy efficiency." Sustainable building materials, green furnishings, geothermal heating and cooling were used when constructing the Center for the Environment building. Adjacent to the center is the 187-acre Fred Stanback Jr. Ecological Preserve, which consists of mature hardwood and floodplain forests. The preserve is recognized by the NC Natural Heritage Program as a significant natural area under management by Catawba College.

== Athletics ==
Catawba's athletic teams compete in the NCAA Division II South Atlantic Conference as the Catawba Indians, named after the Catawba Indian Tribe that is native to the Piedmont regions of the Southeastern USA.

Catawba features 22 NCAA Division II men's and women's sports.

Men's sports: baseball, basketball, cross country, football, golf, lacrosse, soccer, swimming, tennis, track and field and volleyball.

Women's sports: basketball, cross country, golf, lacrosse, soccer, softball, swimming, tennis, track and field, and volleyball

Co-ed programs: cheerleading

The Catawba College football team holds the distinction of winning not only the inaugural, but also the second annual Tangerine Bowl, now known as the Citrus Bowl, while allowing only six points. On January 1, 1947, they defeated Maryville College 31–6 and on January 1, 1948, they defeated Marshall University 7–0. The current coach is Tyler Haines.

Catawba College has fielded an eSports team since 2018.

=== Catawba Indians nickname ===
In 2005, the NCAA cited Catawba College as a school with a "hostile" or "abusive" nickname. While the NCAA cannot force a school to change a nickname, it has promised to deny post-season hosting privileges to schools in violation. In response to the designation, Catawba College officials filed a formal appeal to continue the use of the "Catawba Indians" name. Citing the approval of the Catawba Indian Nation, the NCAA granted the appeal on the condition the college use the tribe-specific nickname of the Catawba Indians when referring to the nickname as opposed to simply the "Indians."

== Notable alumni ==
- Vern Benson, professional baseball player and coach
- Katie Carpenter, actress, costume designer, and film producer
- Charlie Coiner, professional football coach
- Scott Holmes, actor
- Phil Kirk, chairman of North Carolina Board of Education; Chief of Staff for Governors Jim Martin and Jim Holshouser and U.S. Senator Jim Broyhill.
- Tara LaRosa, field hockey player and mixed martial artist
- L. J. McCray, professional football player
- Pat McCrory, Mayor of Charlotte, North Carolina from 1995 to 2009; Governor of North Carolina from 2013 to 2017
- Jasika Nicole, actress
- Bucky Pope, professional football player
- Edward F. Rector, United States Army Air Corp World War II Fighter Ace
- Dave Robbins, college basketball coach
- Gil Robinson, professional football player
- Jumal Rolle, professional football player
- T. J. Rooney, chair of Pennsylvania Democratic Party; member of the Pennsylvania House of Representatives
- Jerry Sands, professional baseball player
- Clarence O. Sherrill, military officer, city manager, and lobbyist
- William Lacy Swing, United States Ambassador and United Nations Special Representative of the Secretary-General
- David Taylor, professional football player
- Johnny Temple, professional baseball player
- Jim Tomsula, professional football coach
- Rodney Wallace, mixed martial artist
