= Stacey Snider =

American businesswoman

- Born: April 29, 1960 (age 66)
- Education: University of Pennsylvania (BA); University of California, Los Angeles (JD)
- Occupation: Film industry executive

Stacey Snider (born April 29, 1960) is an American film industry executive. She has served as chair of Universal Pictures, co-chairman/CEO of DreamWorks, and chair and CEO of 20th Century Fox before its acquisition by The Walt Disney Company. She was a co-founder of global entertainment company Sister in 2019, and CEO of the company before stepping down in 2023.

== Early life and education ==
Stacey Snider was born on April 29, 1960 to a Jewish family, and grew up in Philadelphia, Pennsylvania.

She earned a Bachelor of Arts from the University of Pennsylvania in 1982 and a Juris Doctor from the University of California, Los Angeles in 1985.

== Career ==
Snider first worked becoming an assistant at Simpson/Bruckheimer Productions. In December 1986, she was appointed director of development at The Guber/Peters Company at Warner Bros. In 1990 she became executive vice-president of Guber/Peters, by then owned by Sony Entertainment. She ran the company as well as remaining involved in film production at Columbia Studios.

In 1992 Snider was appointed president of production at TriStar Pictures, making her the highest-ranking female executive at a Hollywood studio.

From late 1999 to 2006, Snider was chair of Universal Pictures. During her time there, she oversaw the production of many successful films, eschewing expensive stars. Universal Pictures did well financially out of producing such films as A Beautiful Mind, Gladiator, Erin Brockovich, and The Pianist.

From 2006 to 2014, she served as the co-chairman/CEO of DreamWorks. Under her watch, DreamWorks produced such films as Dreamgirls (2006), Sweeney Todd (2007), and Tropic Thunder (2008). On June 16, 2016, it was announced that Snider, after serving as co-chairman since 2014, would be taking over for Jim Gianopulos as chairman and CEO of Twentieth Century Fox Film Corporation as of June 30, 2017.

On 1 October 2019, British TV producer Jane Featherstone's company Sister Pictures, which had been founded in 2014 with investment from Elisabeth Murdoch (daughter of Australian media magnate Rupert Murdoch, resident in the UK), was absorbed into a new global studio, rebadged as simply "Sister". Sister was co-founded by Featherstone, Murdoch and Snider. Snider headed the investment, acquisition, and integration of several content companies, built the office in Los Angeles, and oversaw development of US television and film projects.

On 9 May 2023, Snider stepped down from her role as CEO of Sister. She moved to a role as a creative advisor, and would also be an independent producer, looking after film and TV at the LA office. She retained shares in the company.

== Other activities ==
Board memberships:

- Special Olympics in Southern California
- American Film Institute
- ArtCenter College of Design in Pasadena, California

In 2012, Snider was part of a group of Hollywood studio heads and producers who contributed to a $150 million renovation of the Wilshire Boulevard Temple in Los Angeles, a synagogue to which Snider and many others in the entertainment business belong.

== Recognition ==
In 2002 Snider was ranked second in The Hollywood Reporter's list of the "100 most powerful women in Hollywood".

She has been honored by the American Jewish Committee with the Dorothy and Sherrill C. Corwin Human Relations Award for her professional and civic endeavors.

== Personal life ==
Snider is married and has two daughters.

As of 2012 Snider was a member of the Wilshire Boulevard Temple.
