= James Farrell (television producer) =

British television executive

James Farrell is a British television executive, currently working as Managing Director of production company Terrible Productions.

== Career ==
Farrell was previously executive producer on HBO's prequel to Game of Thrones and head of development at BBC Studios. He was named a Broadcast magazine Hot Shot in 2014 and his shows have won at the BAFTAs, IFTAs and National Television Awards.

== This Is Going to Hurt ==
Farrell served as an executive producer for the BBC medical comedy drama series This Is Going to Hurt, an adaptation of his husband Adam Kay's memoir of the same name which won three BAFTAs, as well as a Broadcast Award, a Royal Television Society Programme Award, a Writers Guild Award and a Gotham Award.

== Personal life ==
Farrell is married to writer and comedian Adam Kay and is also known professionally as James Kay.
