= Mark Gillis =

British actor, writer and director

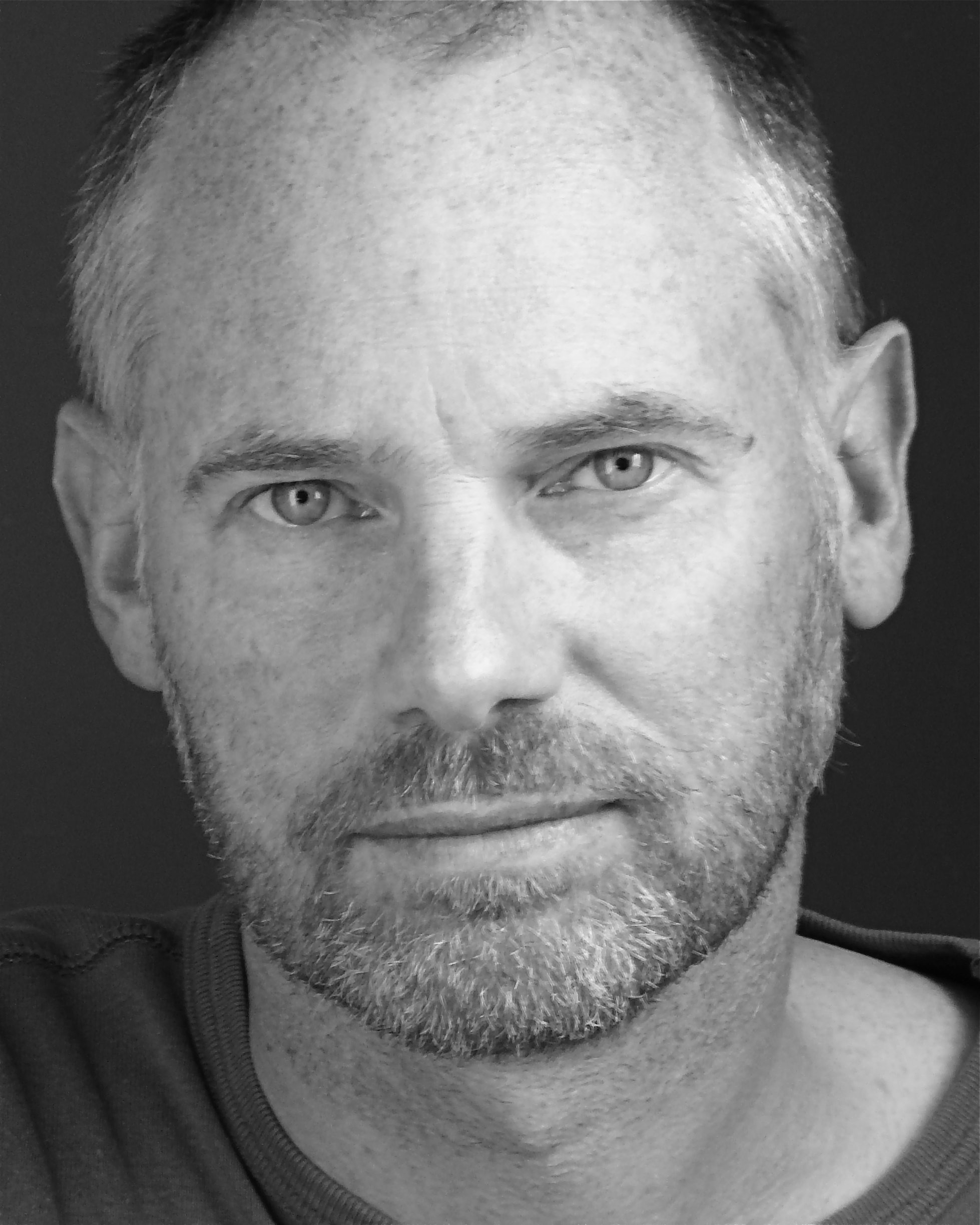
Mark Gillis

Mark Gillis is a British actor, writer and director. He is best known for writing, producing and directing the feature film Sink and playing William Elliot in the Netflix series Eric.

== Profile ==
Gillis was born in Hayes in North West London and attended Dr Triplett's Primary School and Bishopshalt School. He studied at the University of Kent where he obtained a degree in biochemistry.

While at university he formed the three man comedy act 76a. After performing at the Edinburgh Festival he wrote for BBC Radio 4's topical comedy show Week Ending and he did this while touring as a writer and performer with the group. He has combined writing, performing and directing ever since.

He co-founded and was artistic director of the touring production company LPC, with whom he produced and directed several European tours of modern classic plays such as Waiting for Godot, The Caretaker, and The Importance of Being Earnest.

As an actor he has appeared on stage, film and television and was formerly a member of the Royal Shakespeare Company.

Gillis' debut feature film as writer/director, Sink, had its cinema release in late 2018, distributed by Verve Pictures. Associate Producers include Alan Rickman and Mark Rylance. It premiered at Curzon Soho, where Gillis was joined by Rylance and lead actor Martin Herdman for a Q&A. The film was positively reviewed, receiving a 100% approval rating on Rotten Tomatoes. The film was released on DVD in May 2019.

== Selected theatre ==
As an actor his work in theatre includes Agrippa in the Chichester production of Antony & Cleopatra with Kim Cattrall and Michael Pennington. He was formerly a member of the Royal Shakespeare Company, performing in As You Like It, Macbeth and Troilus and Cressida, in seasons at the RSC Stratford and The Barbican. He played Mark in the Irish premiere of Mark Ravenhill's play Shopping and Fucking. The play caused some controversy and there were protests from local media questioning whether Northern Ireland was ready for this play. The theatre was picketed in Belfast and at other venues on the tour.

Other theatre includes Antony & Cleopatra (Liverpool Playhouse), Mamma Mia! (West End), A Doll's House and Hedda Gabler (Battersea Arts Centre), Rush (King's Head Theatre), Crystal Clear and Gatsby (King's Head Theatre), The Dumb Waiter (Lee Strasberg Theatre and Film Institute, L.A.), Ivanov (Bridewell Theatre), The Memory of Water (Vienna's English Theatre), Canaries Sometimes Sing (Old Red Lion), The Picture of Dorian Gray (Finborough Theatre), The Caretaker (San Fedele Theatre, Milan), Waiting for Godot (Tour) and Whose Life Is It Anyway? (Tour).

== Selected television and film ==
He has appeared in several television and film roles including The White House, Jesus: Crown of Thorns, Eric, The Lost Pirate Kingdom, Grantchester, Lee and Dean, Sink, Silent Witness, The Bill, Emmerdale, Grange Hill, EastEnders, Holby City, The Brittas Empire, Absolute Hell, Prick, Jean Moulin, Either/Or, Going Home and An Ideal Husband.
