= Sacrifice (2025 film) =

Film by Romain Gavras

- Theatrical release poster
- Directed by: Romain Gavras
- Written by: Will Arbery; Romain Gavras
- Produced by: Robert Walak; Jacob Perlin; Romain Gavras; Gregory Jankilevitsch; Klaudia Śmieja-Rostworowska; Giorgios Karnavas
- Starring: Chris Evans; Anya Taylor-Joy; Vincent Cassel; Sam Richardson; John Malkovich; Salma Hayek
- Cinematography: Matias Boucard
- Edited by: Benjamin Weill
- Music by: GENER8ION
- Production companies: Mid March Media; Film4; Iconoclast; Heretic Films
- Distributed by: Black Bear Pictures (United Kingdom); Netflix (United States and France); Eagle Pictures (Italy); Prorom Distribution (Bulgaria)
- Release dates: September 6, 2025 (TIFF); August 12, 2026 (Italy); October 16, 2026 (United States and France)
- Running time: 100 minutes
- Countries: Bulgaria; Cyprus; France; Greece; Italy; United Kingdom; United States
- Language: English
- Box office: $453,104

Sacrifice is a 2025 action-adventure comedy-drama film directed by Romain Gavras, who co-wrote it with Will Arbery. It stars an ensemble cast that features Chris Evans, Anya Taylor-Joy, Vincent Cassel, Sam Richardson, John Malkovich, and Salma Hayek.

The film had its world premiere in the Special Presentations section of the 2025 Toronto International Film Festival on September 6, 2025. It was released on Netflix in the United States and France on October 16, 2026, and received mixed reviews from critics.

== Plot ==
An actor, Mike Tyler, is attempting his return from a personal “rock bottom” (which has something to do with a flamethrower incident) when he is abducted along with two others: Ben Bracken, the wealthy host of the gala, and a Pakistani dancer posing as a Native American named Katie.

The three are ultimately taken from the environmental gala on a Greek island to an island with a volcano, where they are forced to march to their deaths by a radical group. This group, led by Joan, believes that by sacrificing these three people into a volcano, “the fire”, humanity will be saved from a global catastrophe that is two days away.

All of this unfolds to the dismay of Joan's father, Gunnar. In his attempts to stop her from sacrificing him as the final act of the ritual, it is uncovered that he also believes the world is ending and lives in a bunker.

Ultimately, the three are sacrificed, with Mike’s decision being made by choice as he runs and dives into the volcano just as rescue crews are showing up.

== Cast ==
- Chris Evans as Mike Tyler, a film star kidnapped by Joan
- Anya Taylor-Joy as Joan, a zealot on a mission to save the world from a fiery reckoning
- Vincent Cassel as Ben Bracken, the world's richest man who is kidnapped by Joan
- Salma Hayek as Gloria Bracken, a pop star and Ben’s wife
- Ambika Mod as Katie / Daughter Nature, an unlucky woman kidnapped by Joan
- Sam Richardson as Oliver, Mike’s agent
- John Malkovich as Gunnar, the father of Joan, Arthur, and Louise
- Charli XCX as Mother Nature
- Yung Lean as Arthur, Joan's and Louise’s brother
- Jade Croot as Louise, Arthur’s and Joan’s sister
- Miriam Silverman as Anna
- Jeremy O. Harris as DK

== Production ==
It was announced in May 2024 that Romain Gavras was set to direct and co-write the film, with Anya Taylor-Joy, Chris Evans, Salma Hayek and Brendan Fraser cast to star. In September 2024, Sam Richardson joined the cast, with Fraser exiting due to scheduling conflicts. In November 2024, Vincent Cassel, Ambika Mod, John Malkovich, Charli XCX, Yung Lean, Jade Croot, Jeremy O. Harris and Miriam Silverman joined the cast, with Cassel replacing Fraser.

Principal photography began in November 2024, in Greece, Bulgaria, and Iceland. Filming wrapped on December 30, 2024.

== Release ==
Sacrifice premiered in the Special Presentations section of the Toronto International Film Festival on September 6, 2025. In May 2026, Netflix acquired U.S. distribution rights to the film at the Marché du Film; the streaming service subsequently bought French rights as well. The film was first theatrically released in Italy on August 12, 2026, and will receive a streaming release from Netflix in the United States and France on October 16.

== Reception ==
On the review aggregator website Rotten Tomatoes, 35% of 57 critics' reviews are positive, with an average rating of 5/10. Metacritic, which uses a weighted average, assigned the film a score of 46 out of 100, based on 16 critics, indicating "mixed or average" reviews.

Matt Zoller Seitz in reviewing the film for RogerEbert.com, sums it up. saying ..."for all its imagination and keen comic timing, “Sacrifice” is only somewhat coherent"...

It is one of the lowest-rated films of the year to have premiered at fall film festivals.
