= Eric (TV series) =

2024 British TV miniseries

- Genre: Drama; Psychological thriller
- Created by: Abi Morgan
- Showrunner: Abi Morgan
- Written by: Abi Morgan
- Directed by: Lucy Forbes
- Starring: Benedict Cumberbatch; Gaby Hoffmann; McKinley Belcher III
- Composer: Keefus Ciancia
- Country of origin: United Kingdom
- Original language: English
- No. of episodes: 6

Production
- Executive producers: Benedict Cumberbatch; Lucy Forbes; Abi Morgan; Jane Featherstone; Lucy Dyke
- Producer: Holly Pullinger
- Running time: 52–55 minutes
- Production companies: Sister; Little Chick

Original release
- Network: Netflix
- Release: 30 May 2024

Eric is a 2024 British psychological thriller television drama created by Abi Morgan for the streaming service Netflix. It stars Benedict Cumberbatch as a distraught puppeteer whose young son goes missing in 1980s New York City. The script was written by Morgan with Lucy Forbes directing and Holly Pullinger producing the series. The series was released on 30 May 2024.

== Synopsis ==
In 1980s New York City, Vincent is a puppeteer in an unhappy marriage whose nine-year-old son, Edgar, goes missing. Vincent's increasingly volatile behaviour alienates him from his friends, family, and coworkers. After issues with substance abuse, Vincent becomes convinced that he can reunite with Edgar with the help of his seven-foot-tall puppet, Eric.

== Cast ==
- Benedict Cumberbatch as Vincent Anderson and the voice of Eric
- Ivan Morris Howe as Edgar Anderson
- Gaby Hoffmann as Cassie Anderson
- McKinley Belcher III as Michael Ledroit
- Roberta Colindrez as Ronnie
- Jeff Hephner as Richard Costello
- Wade Allain-Marcus as Alex Gator
- Mark Gillis as William Elliot
- Dan Fogler as Lennie Wilson
- Chloe Claudel as Ellis
- Clarke Peters as George Lovett
- Phoebe Nicholls as Anne Anderson
- David Denman as Cripp
- Erika Soto as Tina
- Bamar Kane as Yuusuf Egbe
- Adepero Oduye as Cecile Rochelle
- John Doman as Robert Anderson
- Bobby Schofield as Det Callum Kennedy
- Alexis Molnar as Raya
- Donald Sage Mackay as Jerry
- Bence Orere as Marlon Rochelle
- Orlando Norman as Ricardo
- Stefan Race as TJ
- José Pimentão as Sebastian

== Episodes ==
No.	Title	Directed by	Written by	Original release date
1	"Episode 1"	Lucy Forbes	Abi Morgan	30 May 2024
In 1985, New York puppeteer Vincent Anderson, the creator of the long-running children's television series Good Day, Sunshine! and his team are pressured by the network to broaden the show's appeal by introducing new characters. Vincent's nine-year-old son, Edgar, suggests a big blue monster named Eric, but Vincent is dismissive. One night, Edgar hears Vincent and his mother Cassie's heated argument, and the next morning Vincent allows Edgar to walk the few blocks to his school alone. At work, Vincent arrives with a cut on his forehead and ignores Cassie's multiple calls. Upon coming home he learns that Edgar never arrived at school and cannot be found. NYPD detective Michael Ledroit takes on the case, and a sanitation worker discovers Edgar's bloodstained Good Day, Sunshine! t-shirt. Ledroit has been investigating a nightclub, The Lux, which is on Edgar's route to school. There, Ledroit sees vice cops Kennedy and Nokes beating up a young man in the restroom and hears Kennedy warn Nokes about "Number 8." When Ledroit listens to the secret recording he made, he hears a young boy's voice. A distraught Vincent resorts to drinking, and begins to focus on Edgar's drawings of Eric. The next morning, he starts 'seeing' Eric, who urges him to find Edgar. Meanwhile, Edgar's red jacket is seen in the street.
2	"Episode 2"	Lucy Forbes	Abi Morgan	30 May 2024
Vincent and Cassie make a public appeal for information about Edgar. Ledroit's investigation leads him to the apartment building superintendent George Lovett, who was imprisoned years ago for molesting a child. Ledroit finds evidence in Lovett's apartment that Edgar spent time there. However, during questioning Lovett explains that Edgar often stayed with him when his parents fought. While handing out flyers for missing persons, Cassie spots a homeless woman wearing a red jacket similar to Edgar's. Vincent returns unexpectedly to work to pitch Eric to his boss Lennie, who convinces network executives to consider Vincent's pitch in an upcoming meeting. Ledroit returns to The Lux, discovering that a kitchen worker's son's voice was what he heard on his recording. Combing through CCTV footage from the block of the Andersons' apartment, he discovers that Vincent left the building very shortly after Edgar, which is quite different from the account of events Vincent had given him previously. Vincent works on creating a mock-up of Eric's puppet, while plagued by the imaginary Eric, who both encourages him to pursue this idea and cautions him against antagonizing others in his life.
3	"Episode 3"	Lucy Forbes	Abi Morgan	30 May 2024
Lovett is released and cleared of all charges while Ledroit re-focuses his investigation on Vincent, who is frantically preparing to pitch Eric to the network. During questioning at the police station, Vincent reveals that he had followed Edgar from their building that morning into an alleyway, where they had a confrontation resulting in his tearing of Edgar's t-shirt and then using it to wipe his own blood from the wound he sustained. CCTV footage confirms his account of what happened, so Vincent is released. Cassie meets and sympathizes with Cecile, the mother of another missing boy, Marlon Rochelle, who disappeared eleven months earlier. Vincent delivers a successful pitch to the network, but Lennie is told they want to take on the character of Eric along with firing Vincent, citing his volatile behaviour. Cecile convinces Ledroit to resume the search for Marlon as part of his investigation despite a lack of evidence of his whereabouts, much to his superior's frustration. In a tent city underneath the subway, Edgar is revealed to be alive and hidden.
4	"Episode 4"	Lucy Forbes	Abi Morgan	30 May 2024
After being informed by Lennie that the network has fired him, Vincent responds with a furious tirade about Lennie's disloyalty. He later goes to an elegant restaurant to confront network executive Jerry, but Vincent's father, Robert, a wealthy real estate developer, appears and marches Vincent out of the place. Robert promises to support Vincent on the condition that he goes to rehab. Returning home, Vincent is told by Cassie that she is pregnant with someone else's child, and she demands he move out. In the homeless village, it is shown that Edgar had followed a homeless man, Yuusuf, who is often in his neighbourhood. Edgar had been curious about the man's tag artwork. Ledroit questions a sanitation worker about finding Edgar's bloodied t-shirt, as captured by a neighbourhood CCTV camera. Ledroit is devastated to learn his romantic partner William Elliot has died of AIDS. Vincent stays with Lovett after leaving Cassie, and he asks to see Edgar's drawings of their neighbourhood. Upon inspection, he realizes the drawings are actually a map, which he believes will lead him to Edgar. Ledroit, having found that Lennie was once arrested in a club frequented by young male hustlers, questions him about Edgar and Marlon, so he gives him the name of Ricardo, a young man who might have been one of the last to see Marlon.
5	"Episode 5"	Lucy Forbes	Abi Morgan	30 May 2024
Cassie receives a call from Yuusuf, giving her a meeting location and a demand for the $25,000 cash reward that has been offered by Vincent's parents for Edgar's return. Ledroit pursues Lennie's lead about Ricardo, who reveals that he swapped basketball jerseys with Marlon the day he disappeared, so the jersey Marlon was then wearing was Number 8. Ledroit also suspects that both Ricardo and Marlon frequented The Lux. He asks the club's owner Alex Gator for the club's CCTV footage of the day Marlon disappeared. Meanwhile, Vincent becomes furious after seeing the network's interpretation of Eric when the new character is presented during a charity event. Edgar's map leads him into the subway, and eventually to the homeless village where Edgar is, but neither is aware of the other's presence. Vincent's parents bring in Ledroit when Cassie asks them for the reward money for Edgar. Before the exchange can be made, city hall sends police officers to clear out the homeless village. Yuusuf allows an acquaintance, a girl called Raya, to take Edgar hurriedly to the surface. Vincent briefly spots Edgar in the ensuing chaos. While climbing towards the surface, Edgar slips and drags Raya down with him; both fall into the rushing water of a culvert below.
6	"Episode 6"	Lucy Forbes	Abi Morgan	30 May 2024
The mass eviction of the homeless stimulates mass protests against the police's harsh behaviour. Gator hands Ledroit the missing footage of Marlon being beaten savagely by vice cop Nokes after he was discovered behind the club performing oral sex on Deputy Mayor Richard Costello. Marlon's body was then disposed of by a sanitation crew working for Costello's brother-in-law. Vincent, having passed out during the police raid on the homeless village, comes to and learns that Yuusuf cares for Edgar, who fled from the raid via the culvert. Despite objections from his superior, Ledroit orders Nokes, Costello, his brother-in-law, and the sanitation crew apprehended. Most of the men refuse to talk, but Costello and sanitation worker Misha, overcome with guilt, admit what happened to Marlon. Vincent and Edgar separately make it to the surface. Vincent steals Eric's costume from the studio, crashes the Central Park protest wearing the costume and makes an impassioned plea to Edgar, who sees it on television. Father and son reunite joyfully in their neighbourhood. A few months later, Vincent, now divorced from Cassie and currently in recovery, has rejoined the show, now starring as Eric. Edgar comes to the studio as part of his regular visitation with Vincent, and the two share a moment as the imaginary Eric looks on.

== Production ==
=== Development ===
Netflix commissioned the six-part series in November 2021 to be made by production companies Little Chick and Sister.

The script was written by Abi Morgan, with Lucy Forbes directing and serving as executive producer. Holly Pullinger produced the series, with Cumberbatch starring and acting as executive producer. Jane Featherstone and Lucy Dyke of Sister also executively produce, and Morgan is also an executive producer via Little Chick.

=== Casting ===
In February 2023, it was revealed that joining Cumberbatch in the cast would be Gaby Hoffmann, McKinley Belcher III, Dan Fogler, Clarke Peters, Ivan Morris Howe, Phoebe Nicholls, David Denman, Bamar Kane, Adepero Odyue, Alexis Molnar, and Roberta Colindrez. Cumberbatch had a dual role, providing the voice of the Eric puppet, including in scenes where Eric "exists" on his own. Later the same month, Jeff Hephner and Wade Allain-Marcus joined the cast.

=== Filming ===
Principal photography began by early 2023, with filming locations including Budapest and New York. Cumberbatch was photographed by the media in the street with glasses and a dark green trench coat.

== Release ==
The series was released on Netflix on 30 May 2024.

A soundtrack album featuring original music from the series, composed by Keefus Ciancia, was released on streaming platforms on 31 May 2024. Additionally, the theme song to Good Day Sunshine, written by Tim Minchin, was released onto streaming the same day.

== Reception ==
On the review aggregator website Rotten Tomatoes, 71% of 70 critics' reviews are positive, with an average rating of 6.3/10. The website's consensus reads: "Startlingly disturbing despite its outwardly fuzzy appearance, Eric is a perverse genre-bender that may not fully articulate all of its ideas but offers a memorably demented binge." Metacritic, which uses a weighted average, assigned the film a score of 61 out of 100, based on 31 critics, indicating "generally favorable" reviews.

=== Accolades ===
The series won the BAFTA for Best Costume Design at the 2025 British Academy Television Craft Awards.

For his role in the series, McKinley Belcher III was nominated for Supporting Actor at the Royal Television Society Programme Awards in March 2025. That month, he was also nominated in that category at the 2025 British Academy Television Awards.
