= Very British Problems =

British TV series and social media account

- Narrated by: Julie Walters
- Country of origin: United Kingdom
- Original language: English
- No. of seasons: 2
- No. of episodes: 7

Production
- Running time: 45 minutes

Original release
- Network: Channel 4
- Release: 13 August 2015 – 23 May 2016

Very British Problems is social media brand created by journalist Rob Temple in 2012. It has over 5 million followers across X/Twitter (@SoVeryBritish), Instagram (@VeryBritishProblemsOfficial), Facebook and TikTok.

In 2015, the Very British Problems books, which have sold over 250,000 copies, were made into a television series shown on Channel 4. The first series began on 13 August 2015. A Christmas episode was shown on 17 December 2015. The second series began on 9 May 2016.

The brand produces a range of merchandise, including books, mugs, clothes, calendars and greetings cards.
