= Adam Kay (writer) =

British comedy writer, author, youtuber, comedian and former physician (born 1980)

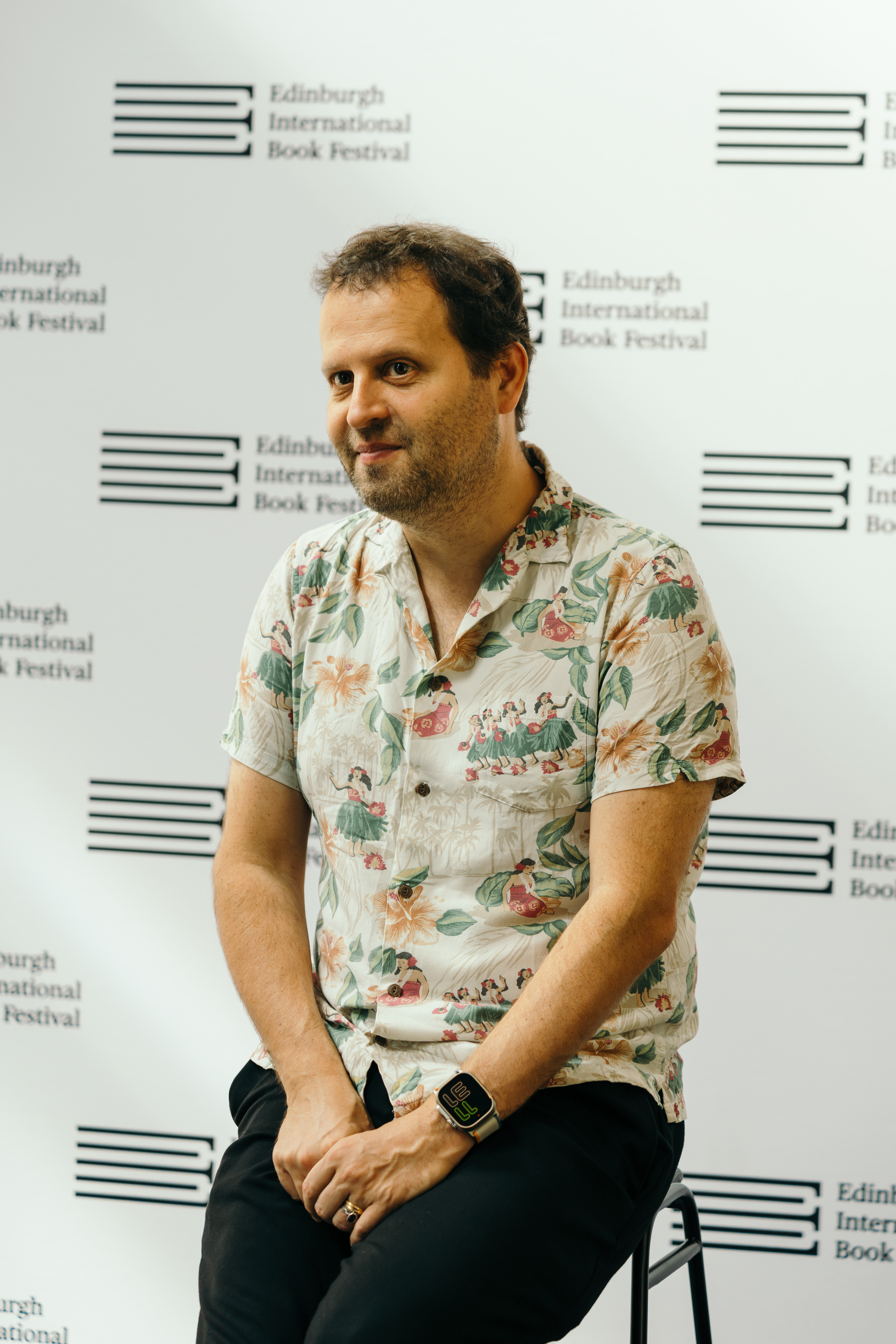
- Kay at the 2025 Edinburgh International Book Festival
- Born: Adam Richard Kay; 12 June 1980 (age 46); Brighton, England
- Education: Dulwich College
- Alma mater: Imperial College London (MBBS)
- Notable work: This Is Going to Hurt (2017)
- Spouse: James Farrell (m. 2018)
- Website: www.adamkay.co.uk

Adam Richard Kay (born 12 June 1980) is a British TV writer, author, comedian and former doctor. He is the author of the memoir This Is Going to Hurt (2017), about his time as a doctor. His television writing credits include This Is Going to Hurt (based on his memoir of the same name), Crims, Mrs. Brown's Boys and Mitchell and Webb.

== Early life and education ==
Adam Kay was born in Brighton, England, to Stewart and Naomi Kay, and grew up in a Jewish household with three siblings. His father being a doctor, Kay describes becoming a doctor as being a default decision. The Kay family was from Poland, the original family name being Strykowski.

Kay attended Dulwich College, leaving in 1997, and Imperial College London, where he read medicine and graduated with a Bachelor of Medicine, Bachelor of Surgery (MBBS) degree in 2004. During his time at medical school, Kay began performing in medical school shows in 1998. While at medical school, he founded the musical comedy group Amateur Transplants and wrote for BBC Radio 4.

== Career ==
Kay initially trained in obstetrics and gynaecology before turning to writing.

=== Medicine ===
Kay worked as a doctor between 2004 and 2010, leaving the profession after a patient's caesarean section was complicated by an undiagnosed placenta praevia; the expectant mother was subsequently taken to the intensive care unit. The baby was delivered stillborn, which left him with symptoms of post-traumatic stress disorder.

=== Music ===
Kay founded the Amateur Transplants. Their song "London Underground", which was set to the tune of "Going Underground" by The Jam, gained significant popularity on the internet in the UK in 2005.

=== Writing ===
Kay's first book, This Is Going to Hurt, based on diaries from his former career as a doctor, was published by Picador in September 2017 and became a Sunday Times bestseller. The paperback edition was also a Sunday Times number one bestseller, a position it held for over a year and selling more than 2.5 million copies. It was chosen as Book of the Year in the UK's 2018 National Book Awards. The book was well received by critics, including in the literary pages of The Times, Financial Times, Guardian, and The Scotsman.

In addition to being named Book of the Year, This Is Going to Hurt also won at the National Book Awards in the categories of Non-Fiction Book of the Year, New Writer of the Year and Book Club Book of the Year. It was also awarded Blackwell's Debut Book of the Year 2017, Sunday Times Humour Book of the Year, and won both Non-Fiction Book of the Year and the overall prize in the 2017 Books Are My Bag Readers' Awards. It was nominated for Non-Fiction Book of the Year in the 2018 British Book Awards, won Esquire Book of the Year and was a selection of the Zoe Ball Book Club. This Is Going to Hurt has been translated into 28 languages, achieving number-one status internationally. It was the UK's second-best selling book of 2018. On 6 July 2018, the BBC announced that Kay would be adapting This Is Going to Hurt as a seven-part comedy-drama for BBC One. It was made by Sister Pictures and Kay is one of the co-executive producers. Part one of the series, also titled This Is Going to Hurt, was broadcast on 8 February 2022. Kay was awarded a BAFTA for his writing of the show at the 2023 British Academy Television Craft Awards.

Kay's second book, Twas the Nightshift before Christmas, was released in October 2019.

Kay is now an established screenwriter, having written and co-created the 2015 BBC Three sitcom series Crims – along with Grandma's House writer Dan Swimer, with other television work as a writer and script editor including Mrs. Brown's Boys, Mongrels, Watson & Oliver, Up the Women, Very British Problems, Flat TV, Our Ex Wife, Who Is America?, Mitchell and Webb and Child Genius.

In April 2020, it was announced that Trapeze would publish a collection of personal stories about the National Health Service (NHS) edited by Kay. Entitled Dear NHS: 100 Stories to Say Thank You, the book includes letters from stars including Paul McCartney, Louis Theroux, and Caitlin Moran.

Since 2020, Kay has written and released several children's books.

In 2022, he published Undoctored: The Story of a Medic Who Ran Out of Patients.

In 2025, he published his first novel: A Particularly Nasty Case.

=== Performing ===
Kay has sold out shows for six years at the Edinburgh Festival Fringe and has also had sell-out nationwide UK tours. His 2018 tour of This Is Going to Hurt sold out a season at the Edinburgh International Conference Centre (EICC), the largest venue of the Edinburgh Fringe, and a week at the Garrick Theatre, before culminating in two shows at the Hammersmith Apollo. He performs regularly at cultural events including the Latitude Festival, and the Cheltenham Literature Festival. Kay won Best Musical Variety Act at the 2014 London Cabaret Awards and has been named by the Evening Standard as one of London's most influential people.

He has performed songs on the topical BBC Radio 4 series The Now Show and has appeared on numerous TV shows, such as The Russell Howard Hour on Sky One, BBC Breakfast, Lorraine, Peston on Sunday and 8 Out of 10 Cats Does Countdown.

=== Books ===
- 2017: This Is Going to Hurt
- 2019: Twas the Nightshift before Christmas
- 2020: Dear NHS: 100 Stories to Say Thank You
- 2020: Adam Kay and Henry Paker, Kay's Anatomy: A Complete (and Completely Disgusting) Guide to the Human Body
- 2021: Adam Kay and Henry Paker, Kay's Marvellous Medicine: A Gross and Gruesome History of the Human Body
- 2022: Undoctored: The Story of a Medic Who Ran Out of Patients
- 2023: Adam Kay and Henry Paker, Kay's Brilliant Brains
- 2023: Adam Kay and Henry Paker, Amy Gets Eaten
- 2023: Adam Kay and Henry Paker, Kay's Incredible Inventions
- 2024: Adam Kay and others, Charlie and the Christmas Factory.
- 2024: Adam Kay and Henry Paker, Dexter Procter the 10-Year-Old Doctor
- 2025: Adam Kay, A Particularly Nasty Case
- 2026: Adam Kay and Henry Paker, Dexter Procter and the Case of the Disappearing Doctor

== Personal life ==
Kay is gay. Kay married James Farrell in 2018, and together they have two children through surrogacy which he announced in June 2023. Kay and his family live in Oxfordshire, England.
