= Sister (production company) =

Production and entertainment company based in the UK and US

Sister Holdings Limited is an independent international production and entertainment company, based in London and Manchester in the UK, and New York City and Los Angeles in the US. Initially founded as Sister Pictures in the UK by British TV producer Jane Featherstone in 2016, it expanded into its present form as a global company in 2019, with co-founders Australian entrepreneur Elisabeth Murdoch, and American businesswoman Stacey Snider. Snider was CEO until she stepped down in 2023, retaining the roles of creative advisor, independent producer, as well as looking after film and TV at the LA office.

== History ==
The production company Sister Pictures was founded by Jane Featherstone (formerly of Kudos) in 2016, with a minority investment from Elisabeth Murdoch (the daughter of Australian media magnate Rupert Murdoch, although not involved in his businesses). The studio's first major project was the highly successful historical drama miniseries Chernobyl, for HBO and Sky, aired in 2019.

On 1 October 2019, the company expanded into a global studio, rebadged as simply "Sister", with co-founders Australian entrepreneur and founder of Shine Group, Elisabeth Murdoch, and American businesswoman Stacey Snider, who formerly headed Twentieth Century Fox. The new company, mostly financed by Murdoch, absorbed Sister Pictures, incorporating existing team members.

In July 2021, Sister entered a first-look deal with Chris Goldberg of Winterlight Pictures. Under the deal, Goldberg would be based in Sister's LA office. In November 2021, the company struck a deal with Danish screenwriter and filmmaker Tobias Lindholm (Borgen, A War) to develop and produce scripted series. The first one was The Best of Us, a dramatisation of 9/11 first responders starring Jeremy Strong. In May 2022, Sister entered a first-look deal with Wychwood Media, a new production company founded by Lewis Taylor and David Yates (director of several Harry Potter films).

Snider headed the investment, acquisition, and integration of several content companies, built the office in Los Angeles, and oversaw development of US television and film projects.

In early 2023, Sister bought a large stake in Yes Yes Media, an unscripted television and video game production company founded by British TV presenter Richard Bacon.

On 9 May 2023, Snider stepped down from her role as CEO of the company. She moved to a role as a creative advisor, and would also be an independent producer, looking after film and TV at the LA office. She retained shares in the company.

Chris Fry was appointed interim CEO in addition to his CFO role. On 1 May 2025, Lucinda Hicks was appointed CEO of the group, with Fry becoming group COO. Hicks, formerly CEO of Banijay UK and COO of Endemol Shine UK (where she and Murdoch had met), had provided consultancy to the company before her appointment.

== Description ==
The company, which is based in London and Manchester in the UK, and New York City and Los Angeles in the US, is focused on independent film and television production. Snider was leading the film business side of the company until her resignation in May 2023. As of September 2025, Jane Featherstone is CCO, Elisabeth Murdoch is executive chair, and Lucinda Hicks is CEO. Despite its name, the company is not purely focused on works created by women. According to Murdoch at the time of its establishment, "We embrace it much more for its values than its gender meaning. It's collaborative, it's joyful, and it means we have each other's back".

It has partnerships with Dorothy Street Pictures (producer of The Greatest Night in Pop (2024); Pamela, a Love Story (2023)); Locksmith Animation (founded and run by Murdoch); podcast company Campside Media; American independent publisher Zando; comic book and digital media publisher AWA Studios; the London music venue KOKO, and scripted comedy and drama production company South of the River Pictures.

=== Educational initiatives ===
The company supports emerging storytellers via various programs, including:

- Writer-in-residence scheme (launched 2018), whose alumni include Miriam Battye, Monsay Whitney, Yasmin Joseph, Zahra Al-Sultani, and Igor Memic
- Screenshot, an initiative co-funded by South of the River Pictures (producers of 2021 TV series Landscapers), which helps writers to develop their original idea from stage to screen
- Ghetto Film School (GFS) London, launched in summer 2020, following the original idea that began in 2000 in the South Bronx, New York City
- Scene and Heard, which partners with children of Somers Town, London, giving them one-on-one adult attention and mentorship by volunteer theatre professionals
- Partnership with Morelands Primary School in Islington, a district with the highest percentage of underprivileged children in London, whereby Sister donates books, encourages reading, and provides a creative education, to encourage the children to consider a future in a creative industry where diversity is underrepresented

== Recognition ==
In 2023, the company was awarded Variety magazine's International Achievement in Television Award, presented at the MIPTV Media Market in Cannes.

== Select filmography ==
- As Sister Productions, TV series Chernobyl (HBO/Sky, 2019)

=== Television ===
- Giri/Haji (BBC Two/Netflix, 2019)
- The Split season 2 (BBC One, 2020)
- Gangs of London (2020)
- Landscapers (2021)
- This Is Going to Hurt (co-producer, with AMC; BBC One, 2022)
- The Power (Prime Video, 2023)
- Kaos (Netflix, 2024)
- Eric (Netflix, 2024)
- Prodigies (Apple TV, TBA)
- The Best of Us (Paramount+, TBA)

=== Film ===
- Good Grief (2023)
- The Woman in Cabin 10 (2025)
