= Katie Carpenter =

American actress

- Education: Catawba College
- Occupations: Actress, costume designer, film producer
- Years active: 2013–present

Katie Carpenter is an American actress, costume designer, and film producer.

== Career ==
Carpenter is a graduate of Catawba College, where she earned a Bachelor of Fine Arts degree in Theatre, Class of 2013, and gained experience in acting and wardrobe design. After first working professionally in Charlotte, North Carolina, she was cast in a film in Atlanta, Georgia and moved there to continue her career.

As an actress she is best known for her role as the flirty Stacey in Netflix's The Haunting of Hill House, and in recurring appearances as the Sewing Witch in The CW's Legacies. She has also appeared in Netflix's House of Cards, Lifetime's Devious Maids, and guest-starred on NBC's Gone. In 2018 she made her formal theatrical debut in Tyler Perry's Acrimony as Carly. She has also produced and starred in her own SAG Comedy Web series and designed a music video for Jencarlos entitled Dure, Dure that took place on a 90’s soap opera set.

When not acting, Carpenter produces films as co-founder of Going Cheek Productions, a production company she started with collaborator Kevin Welch to provide more filmmaking opportunities to women, designs commercials and feature films, or works as a costumer on television shows and films, including Black Lightning, Legacies, MacGyver, Welcome to Pine Grove, and Doom Patrol.

== Awards ==
Carpenter won a performance scholarship to attend Catawba College. During the summer of 2013, she won the Best Actress award in the Greensboro, N.C. 48 Hour Film Project. In 2020, she won the Women in Film and Television Atlanta (WIFTA) Short Film Showcase 2020 Southern Shorts Award for "Best Directing" for co-directing (with Jenna Kanell) the post-apocalyptic short film Deathless.

== Filmography highlights ==
- Legacies (2019-2021), fantasy drama television series
- The Haunting of Hill House (2018), supernatural horror drama television series
- Acrimony (2018), psychological thriller
- Bloody Ballet (2018), independent horror film
- Maid to Order (2016-2017), comedic webseries
- House of Cards (2016), television series
- All Girls Weekend (2016), independent horror film
- Devious Maids (2016), television comedy-drama and mystery series
