= Jane Featherstone =

English television producer

- Occupation: Television producer
- Website: www.sister.net

Jane Elizabeth Featherstone is an English television producer. She founded production company Sister Pictures in 2016, which was in 2019 absorbed into a new venture called Sister, a global TV and film production and development company co-founded by her along with Elisabeth Murdoch and Stacey Snider. As of September 2026, she is Chief Creative Officer of Sister. Prior to that, she was the chief executive of Kudos and co-chairman of Shine UK, now part of Endemol Shine Group.

== Early life and education ==
Jane Elizabeth Featherstone was educated at Old Palace School and the University of Leeds.

== Career ==
Prior to joining Kudos, Featherstone produced the first two series of Touching Evil and the BBC2 film Sex 'n' Death. While employed Hat Trick Productions, she worked on Whose Line Is It Anyway?, Have I Got News for You, and Drop the Dead Donkey.

Featherstone joined Kudos in 2000 as head of drama. She became creative director in 2008 and the company's chief executive in 2011. Whilst at Kudos, she executive produced Spooks, Life on Mars, Ashes to Ashes, Utopia, The Tunnel, and The Smoke. Most recently she has executive produced River by Abi Morgan for BBC1/Netflix, Humans, and the Spooks movie The Greater Good. She left Kudos following the formation of Endemol Shine Group in 2015.

Featherstone founded the TV and film production and development company Sister Pictures in 2016, with a minority investment from Elisabeth Murdoch (the daughter of Australian media magnate Rupert Murdoch). Sister Pictures was a co-producer of Broadchurch for ITV in 2017, Its first major project was the highly successful historical drama miniseries Chernobyl, for HBO and Sky, aired in 2019. Featherstone's other credits with the company included Mayday (BBC1) and series 1 and 2 of The Hour (BBC2), Hustle (BBC1), The Fixer (ITV1), and Tsunami: The Aftermath for HBO and BBC2.

On 1 October 2019, the company expanded into a global studio, rebadged as simply "Sister", with co-founders Elisabeth Murdoch and Stacey Snider. The new company, mostly financed by Murdoch, absorbed Sister Pictures, incorporating existing team members. Its productions include The Split season 2 (BBC One, 2020) The Power (2023); Kaos (Netflix, 2024); and Eric (Netflix, 2024)

Featherstone served as an executive producer for the 2022 BBC medical comedy drama series This Is Going to Hurt.

== Awards ==
- Fellow of the Royal Television Society (2010)
- Best Contribution to the Medium Award, Women in Film and TV awards (2007)
