= This Is Going to Hurt =

2017 book by Adam Kay

This is Going to Hurt: Secret Diaries of a Junior Doctor
- First edition
- Author: Adam Kay
- Language: English
- Genre: Nonfiction
- Published: September 7, 2017
- Publisher: Picador
- Publication place: United Kingdom
- ISBN: 1509858636

This Is Going to Hurt: Secret Diaries of a Junior Doctor is a nonfiction book by the British comedy writer Adam Kay, published in 2017 by Picador. It is a collection of diary entries written by Kay during his medical training from 2004 to 2010. Kay's book discusses political issues in the health care system of the National Health Service in the United Kingdom and societal conflicts between the general population and neglected doctors. Kay accomplishes this by incorporating humour into his personal anecdotes that depict his life as he progresses through his medical training, and his eventual resignation from this career.

== Background ==
This Is Going to Hurt is mostly composed of diary entries Adam Kay wrote during his medical training under the National Health Service. It was recommended to Kay to write this diary as a "reflective practice" in which he could log any interesting clinical experiences he experienced throughout his training. Five years after his resignation, Kay was officially removed from the medical register which prompted him to dispose of all the medical files he had been storing, leading him to review his reflective journal. Around this time in 2015, junior doctors entered contract disputes with the NHS leading the Secretary of State for Health and Social Care, Jeremy Hunt, to accuse junior doctors of being greedy. This event motivated Kay to respond to this accusation by releasing This Is Going to Hurt, which illustrates his own experiences as a junior doctor.

== Outline ==
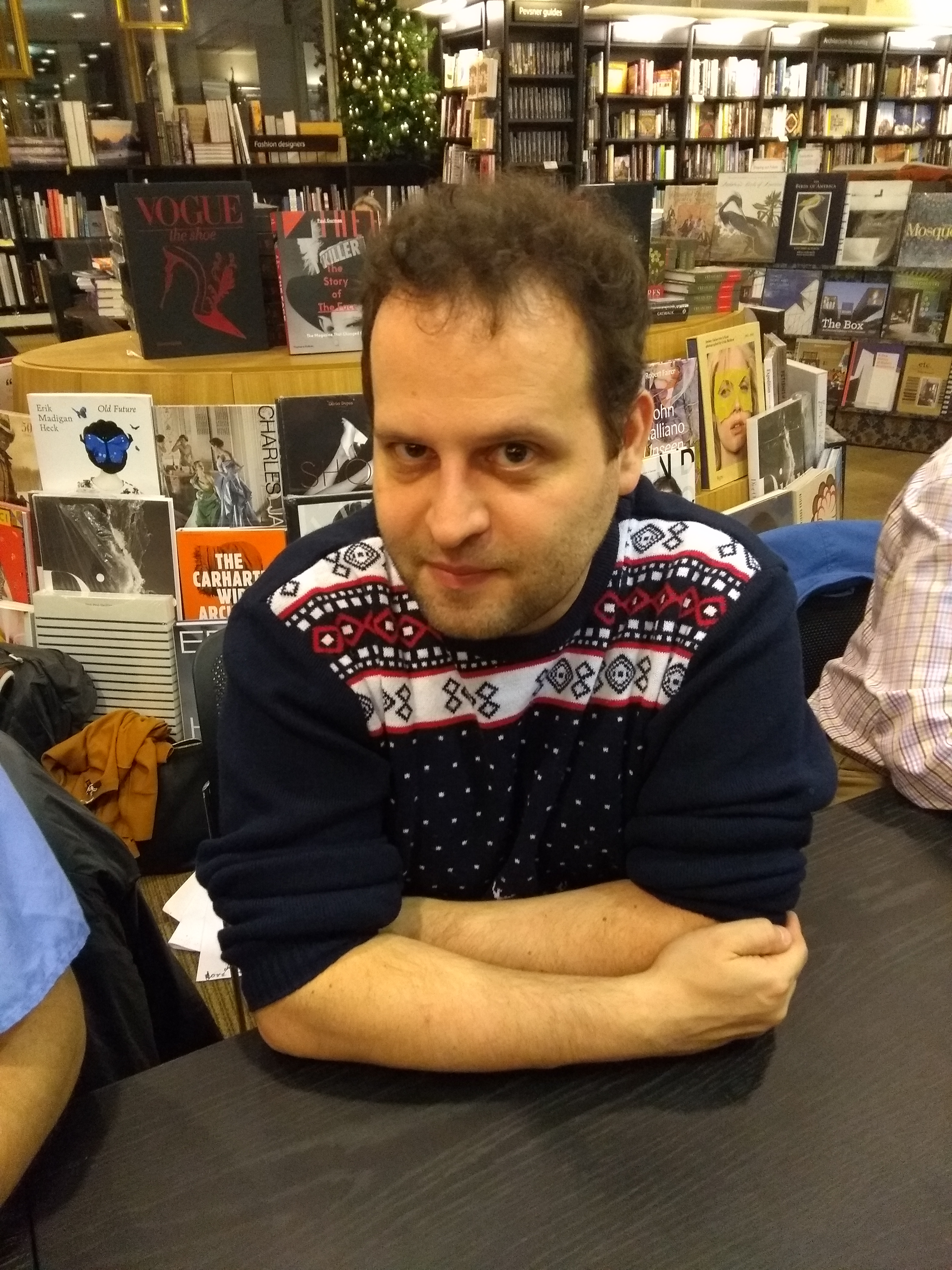
Adam Kay

Kay began his medical training as a House Officer in 2004 with the United Kingdom's National Health Service after attending Dulwich College and Imperial College School of Medicine. In his comedic recollection of his time as a house officer, Kay describes four foreign objects he removed from patients' rectums, his first time saving someone's life, and long nights spent in the A&E. Kay became a Senior House Officer by August 2005, a year after officially becoming a doctor. It is at this point in his career that he decided to specialise in obstetrics and gynaecology, or "brats and twats" as Kay referred to it.

In August 2007, Kay was promoted to Registrar, the third highest ranking position after Consultant and Senior Registrar. His diary entries in his time as these positions describe multiple successful births, failed births, infertility problems, and sexually transmitted diseases/infections, along with a gruelling workload that included sleepless nights, unpaid overtime, minimal gratitude from co-workers, sleeping in the car park, and inability to have someone cover a shift leading to minimal holiday and sick time. Throughout these experiences, Kay recalls times in which he gets close to quitting due to the vast amount of stress the job inflicted on his life, harming his health and social relationships. What kept him going was positive outcomes from helping patients in multiple ways ranging from helping couples become pregnant to delivering a multitude of babies a night. This feeling of being a "low-grade superhero" is what Kay claims helped him push through all the other inconveniences related to the job.

In August 2010, Kay received his promotion to Senior Registrar. In the diary, Kay takes note of the increased responsibility that came with the promotion and how it added a new form of pressure since he was now supposed to be the person contacted in severe emergencies, where the Senior House Officer and Registrar were unable to solve the problem.

On 5 December 2010, Kay began to perform a caesarean on a patient who had undiagnosed placenta praevia. Kay first delivered the placenta and then the baby, which was dead and unable to be resuscitated. The detached placenta caused heavy haemorrhaging; Kay and the senior consultants called into theatre failed to stop the bleeding and, after 2 hours and 12 litres of blood loss, a hysterectomy was performed. The mother was transferred to the intensive care unit and Kay was told to expect the worst. After this event Kay became depressed. Whilst he had followed best practice, and the missed placenta praevia should have been found in previous scans, Kay obsessed that he might have prevented the death of the baby and endangerment of the mother's life by somehow diagnosing the placenta praevia prepartum. Several months after this event, Kay resigned his position.

== Themes ==
The most prevalent theme present in This Is Going to Hurt is the mistreatment and neglect that doctors have to endure. Throughout his time working for the NHS, Adam Kay was deprived of multiple basic amenities that other occupations have. Kay was forced to stay hours after his shift would end with no pay, be unable to have a sick day or go on holiday because it was extremely difficult to find someone to cover his shift; while on shift, he would be unable to sleep even if he had free time; and, in general, junior doctors like Kay felt severely underpaid for their services. Kay notes that his starting wage as a junior doctor was so poor that he would be better off financially working at McDonald's. This sense of neglect was emphasised after Kay's career-ending event since he wasn't allowed to take any time off to emotionally recover. The next day he was forced to go back to work even though he was not in the right mindset to and had asked for a week off. No therapy was offered to Kay to possibly help him after the traumatic event, further debilitating his emotions and mind.

The traumatic event emphasises another theme present which involves the humanising of doctors. In This Is Going to Hurt Kay discusses how the general public expects doctors to be more than human. They expect doctors to be available at all times at their full efficiency, disregarding the fact that they are also humans. Kay claims that people forget doctors also have to spend time with their families and friends, they have to sleep, eat and take care of themselves, and more importantly they expect doctors to be error-free. Doctors' fallibility is unavoidable since they are human and are always prone to making mistakes. Not only did Kay make a mistake by missing the diagnosis of placenta praevia, but he had previously slightly cut the cheek of a newborn baby during a caesarean, mainly due to lack of sleep during his night shift.

The book combines these themes to argue against Jeremy Hunt's comments concerning the motivation of doctors, justifying the view that doctors are not greedy, and do not pursue a career in medicine entirely motivated by money. Through this book Kay highlighted the many adversities junior doctors must face for the minimal pay they receive, and sought to spread awareness to support doctors in their contract disputes with the NHS.

== Critical reception ==
Upon its release in September 2017, This Is Going to Hurt was praised for having comedy while also spreading awareness of the lives of junior doctors.

A review in The Scotsman said that the book "will make your eyes water... and it may well make you choke on hot tea." The social importance of the book is stressed in the review as being "vital and timely; it should be required reading for anyone who ever has any political or financial responsibility for [England's] health services."

== Recognition ==
Listed are all the recognitions This Is Going to Hurt has received since its release:

- 2017 Winner Blackwell's Debut of the Year
- 2017 Winner Books are My Bag Non-fiction Book of the Year
- 2017 Short-listed Blackwell's Book of the Year
- 2017 Winner Books are My Bag Readers Awards Non-Fiction Award
- 2018 Short-listed British Book Awards: Non-fiction Narrative Book of the Year
- 2018 Short-listed Slightly Foxed Best First Biography Prize

== Adaptations ==
Shortly after its release in September 2017, Naomi De Pear of Sister Pictures acquired the television rights to This Is Going to Hurt. Sister Picture, an independent production company founded in 2015, acquired these rights in a 12-way auction between other interested producers. The television series based on This Is Going to Hurt is being written by Adam Kay and developed by Katie Carpenter along with Naomi De Pear, who will also executive produce the series. On 6 July 2018, the BBC announced that the adaptation would be made by Sister Pictures and shown on BBC Two as a seven-part comedy-drama. In February 2022 this adaption was broadcast as a seven-part comedy-drama on BBC1.

In 2024, an extract was taken from the book and used as a source for a GCSE English Language Paper 2 exam.
