= Dean Fagan =

British actor

- Born: 1988 (age 37–38)
- Education: University of Salford
- Occupation: Actor
- Years active: 2006–present

Dean Anthony Fagan (born 1988) is a British actor from Withington in South Manchester. He is best known for portraying mechanic Luke Britton in the ITV soap opera Coronation Street from 2014 to 2018.

== Early life ==
Fagan graduated from the University of Salford in 2010.

== Career ==
Fagan started his career in the British adventure film Treasure of Albion in 2006. Later in 2010, he starred as Mikey Craig in the biographical drama television film, Worried About the Boy, directed by Julian Jarrold and written by Tony Basgallop, which is based on the life of English singer Boy George.

In 2014, Fagan starred as Luke Britton in the ITV soap opera Coronation Street. Fagan described his character, Luke "is an ambitious cheeky chappy who's a dreamer as well. He dreams about his future aspirations, and he dreams about women too! He tries his best to attain his goals and improve himself, but whether he keeps his focus is another matter, because he's easily distracted! He's a nice guy but he has a past." Fagan left the cast in 2018, with Britton's final scenes airing on 5 January 2018. On leaving Coronation Street, Fagan shared that Britton was "going to be a pivotal part of the start of [Phelan]’s demise, the start of the unravelling, that someone else has found out the truth and he has now killed again which is a desperate act and one that is going to eventually start more questions being asked."

In 2021, Fagan starred as Stevie in the three-part BBC One television drama Time about a visceral, emotional and high-stakes portrayal of life in a British prison.

In January 2022, Fagan starred in the second series of the RTÉ One thriller drama series Smother, in which he portrayed Denis Ahern's estranged son, Finn. In regards of his casting in the series, Fagan stated that it was a new challenge starring alongside Dervla Kirwan. He also recalled his experience working on set in Coronation Street with Smother:

Coronation Street had been going by the time I got in there, so I would argue that it’s more nerve-wracking coming into something like that. It’s an institution; in Coronation Street, everybody is set in their place and the characters are so well-known. In Smother, it’s like a relay race, I suppose. I had to come in, help keep the pace going and slot in nicely but everybody was fantastic. They were welcoming and understanding and hopefully that energy comes across.

== Filmography ==
=== Television ===
Year	Title	Role	Notes
2010	Worried About the Boy	Mikey Craig	TV movie
2011	Scott & Bailey	Paul Goff	Episode: "Vendetta"
2011	Fresh Meat	Kamal	Episode: "Episode 3"
2012	Monroe	Steve	Episode: "Episode 1"
2012	Homefront	Adam Smeeton	
2013	All at Sea	Karl	Episode: "Chips"
2014–2018	Coronation Street	Luke Britton	Series regular
2019	Vera	Dave Miller	Episode: "Cuckoo"
2019	Doctors	Sam Hayes	Episode: "A Bad Place"
2021	Time	Stevie	
2022 - 2023	Smother	Finn Ahern	Season 2 & Season 3 Regular
2025	Midsomer Murders	Paul Randall	Episode: "Top of the Class"
2026	Missed Call	Neil Scott	Main role

=== Film ===
Year	Title	Role	Notes
2006	Treasure of Albion	Edmund	
2014	The 9th	Davis Mulligan	
2017	Brexit Shorts: Go Home		Short
2020	Pace	Rick	
2024	Gladiator II	Champion Of The Fighting Pits	

=== Video games ===
Year	Title	Role	Notes
2022	Elden Ring	Thug/Blackguard Big Boggart	
