= Louise Ironside =

Scottish screenwriter and actress

- Born: Edinburgh
- Occupations: Screenwriter, actress

Louise Ironside is a Scottish screenwriter and actress.

== Early life and education ==
Louise Ironside was born in Edinburgh, Scotland. She studied drama at The Royal Scottish Academy of Music & Drama (now The Royal Conservatoire of Scotland).

== Career ==
Her acting career began in the 1990s, working both in TV and theatre. Notable roles include: Caroline Lewis in Channel 4s Brookside, Ophelia in Hamlet, for the Royal Lyceum, Edinburgh and Adele in the World Premiere of David Greig's Europe at the Traverse Theatre, Edinburgh (1994).

During this time, Ironside began writing for several small production houses in and around Edinburgh. This early work includes Risk for the Grassmarket Project, and The Homemade Child and The Little Lady From The Lucky Star both for Lung Ha's Theatre Company, and Trade for Oxygen House.

In 2000 she served as Writer In Residence at the Traverse Theatre, Edinburgh. Work writing for BBC Radio followed, including: Kitty Elizabeth Must Die for 'The Wire' on Radio 3 and John Glenn Stole My Spacesuit for Radio 4.

She would then embark upon a highly successful screenwriting career, beginning with writing multiple episodes for the long-running Scottish drama River City. Since then, she has written for many other popular television series, such as Law & Order: UK, Call The Midwife, Shetland, Waterloo Road, Lip Service, Deep Water, The Tunnel and The Split.

== TV Writing credits ==
Production	Notes	Broadcaster
River City	22 episodes (2004-2014)	BBC One
Waterloo Road	4 episodes (2009–2010)	BBC One
Lip Service	1 episode (2012)	BBC Three
Law & Order: UK	1 episode (2014)	ITV
The Tunnel	2 episodes (2016-2017)	Sky AtlanticCanal+
Call The Midwife	4 episodes (2017-2019)	BBC One
Shetland	1 episode (2018)	BBC One
The Split	1 episode (2018)	BBC One
Deep Water	2 episodes (2018)	ITV
Grantchester	2 episodes (2021-2022)	ITV
Marie Antoinette	10 episodes (2022-2025)	BBC Two

== Awards and nominations ==
TV

Year	Award	Category	Work	Result
2012	BAFTA Scotland	Best Writer	Lip Service (Series 2. Episode 5)	Nominated
2016	Writer's Guild Of Great Britain	Best Long Running TV Series	River City (Series 13. Episode 8)	Won
