= The Split (TV series) =

British legal drama television series

- Genre: Legal drama
- Created by: Abi Morgan
- Written by: Abi Morgan; Jane Eden; Louise Ironside; Matt Jones
- Directed by: Jessica Hobbs; Paula Van Der Oest; Joss Agnew; Dee Koppang O’Leary; Abi Morgan; Giulia Gandini
- Starring: Nicola Walker; Stephen Mangan; Fiona Button; Annabel Scholey; Barry Atsma; Deborah Findlay
- Composer: Isobel Waller-Bridge
- Country of origin: United Kingdom
- Original language: English
- No. of series: 4
- No. of episodes: 20

Production
- Executive producers: Jane Featherstone; Abi Morgan; Jessica Hobbs; Lucy Richer
- Producer: Lucy Dyke
- Running time: 60 minutes (inc. adverts)
- Production company: Sister

Original release
- Network: BBC One (UK); SundanceTV (US; series 1-2); BBC America (US; series 3)
- Release: 24 April 2018 – 30 December 2024

Related
- The Split Up

The Split is a British legal drama television series, written and created by Abi Morgan, that first broadcast in the United Kingdom on BBC One from 24 April 2018. The first series, commissioned in August 2016, follows the lives of the Defoe family, who all work in divorce law for the family firm, aside from eldest sister Hannah (Nicola Walker), who works for rival family law firm Noble & Hale, with their youngest daughter being a nanny. The series co-stars Stephen Mangan, Fiona Button, Annabel Scholey and Barry Atsma.

Series two saw the return of the Defoe family at newly merged law firm Noble Hale Defoe, with most of the original cast confirmed. The third and final series premiered on 4 April 2022. For this performance, Walker received a TV Choice Award nomination for Best Actress and a National Television Award nomination for Drama Performance while The Split was nominated for Returning Drama. The series returned for a two-part special on 29 December 2024.

== Cast ==
=== Main ===
- Nicola Walker as Hannah Stern, a divorce lawyer working for Noble & Hale
- Stephen Mangan as Nathan Stern, Hannah's husband, a barrister
- Fiona Button as Rose Defoe, Hannah's youngest sister
- Annabel Scholey as Nina Defoe, Hannah's younger sister, a fellow divorce lawyer for Defoe's, the family practice
- Deborah Findlay as Ruth Defoe, Hannah's mother, the director of the family firm
- Barry Atsma as Christie Carmichael, Hannah's former boyfriend who also works for Noble & Hale (series 1–3)
- Stephen Tompkinson as Davey McKenzie, a millionaire divorcing his wife (series 1)
- Meera Syal as Goldie McKenzie, Davey's wife and his company's secretary (series 1, 3)
- Anthony Head as Oscar Defoe, Hannah's long lost father (series 1)
- Rudi Dharmalingam as James Cutler, Rose's fiancé, later husband (series 1–3)
- Chukwudi Iwuji as Alexander 'Zander' Hale, director of Noble Hale Defoe (series 1–3)
- Donna Air as Fi Hansen, a famous presenter divorcing her abusive husband Richie (series 2)
- Ben Bailey Smith as Richie Hansen, Fi's abusive and controlling husband (series 2)
- Damien Molony as Tyler Donaghue, Zander's fiancé, later husband (series 2–3)
- Ian McElhinney as Prof Ronnie, a friend and later love interest of Ruth Defoe (series 2–4)
- Lara Pulver as Kate Pencastle, a child psychologist and Nathan's new partner (series 3)
- Kobna Holdbrook-Smith as Glen Peters, the vicar performing Rose and James's wedding ceremony (main series 4; supporting series 1, 3)
- Elizabeth Roberts as Olivia 'Liv' Stern, Hannah and Nathan's elder daughter (main series 4; supporting series 1–3)
- Alex Guersman as Gael, Liv's fiancé (main series 4; supporting series 3)
- Romina Cocca as Valentina Carrillo, Gael's mother (series 4)
- Manu Fullola as Álvaro, Gael's father (series 4)
- Toby Stephens as Archie Moore, a lawyer and old friend of Álvaro's (series 4)
- Tibu Fortes as Julian, Nina's partner (series 4)
- Amanda Goldsmith as Wren Dinae, Archie's plus-one to the wedding (series 4)

=== Supporting ===
- Maggie O'Neill as Yvonne Duchy, Goldie's best friend, who is having an affair with her husband (series 1)
- Josette Simon as Maya, Oscar Defoe's second partner (series 1)
- Mathew Baynton as Rex Pope, a stand-up comedian (series 1–2)
- Mollie Cowen as Tilly Stern, Hannah and Nathan's younger daughter
- Toby Oliver as Vinnie Stern, Hannah and Nathan's son
- Ellora Torchia as Maggie Lavelle, a junior solicitor at Noble & Hale (series 1–2)
- Amaka Okafor as Chloe, Nathan's pupil (series 2)
- Brenock O'Connor as Sasha, Liv Stern's boyfriend (series 1)
- Kerry Fox as Judge Joyce Aspen (series 1)
- Anna Chancellor as Melanie Aickman, a family lawyer (series 2–3)
- Karen Bryson as Leonora 'Lennie' Hale, Zander's sister who is seeking to divorce her husband (series 3)
- Clarence Smith as Felix Sanderson, Leonora's husband (series 3)
- Lindsay Duncan as Caroline, the ex-wife of a deceased earl (series 3)
- Jemima Rooper as India, the young fiancée of the late earl (series 3)
- Radhika Aggarwal as Prisha, wife of the recipient of James's heart (series 3)
- Gerald Kyd as J. J. Johnson, a family lawyer (series 3)
- Lily Cole as Bella (series 3)
- Dariam Coco as Lola, an employee of Valentina and Álvaro's (series 4)
- Pedro Gutiérrez as Xavier Santos, a court clerk and old friend of Valentina's (series 4)

== Production ==
Production for the first series began in July 2017 in London. On 13 January 2017, SundanceTV announced that it would be partnering with the BBC to produce the series. SundanceTV will thus hold exclusive rights for broadcast in the United States. Series 1 was released on DVD on 4 June 2018.

A second series was commissioned in May 2018 with production beginning in March 2019. Donna Air and Ben Bailey Smith joined the cast for the second series as high-profile clients for the law firm and Damien Molony as the character Tyler Donaghue. The first episode of series 2 aired in the UK on BBC One on 11 February 2020 and in the United States on Sundance TV beginning on 15 May 2020. During filming Series 2, production visited Maidstone TV Studios to film a studio show segment.

Series 3 premiered on BBC One on 4 April 2022. All six episodes were released on BBC iPlayer on the same day. Season three premiered in the US on AMC+ and Sundance Now on 23 June 2022 in full a week ahead of its linear broadcast premiere, with the show moving from SundanceTV to sister network BBC America, starting 27 June, with each episode airing weekly.

== Episodes ==
=== Series overview ===
| Series | Episodes | Originally released | | Average UK viewers (millions) |
| Series | Episodes | First released | Last released | Average UK viewers (millions) |
|---|---|---|---|---|
| 1 | 6 | 24 April 2018 | 29 May 2018 | 5.73 |
| 2 | 6 | 11 February 2020 | 17 March 2020 | 5.35 |
| 3 | 6 | 4 April 2022 | 9 May 2022 | 4.27 |
| 4 | 2 | 29 December 2024 | 30 December 2024 | 4.94 |

=== Series 1 (2018) ===
| No. overall | No. in series | Title | Directed by | Written by | Original release date | U.K viewers (millions) |
|---|---|---|---|---|---|---|
| 1 | 1 | "Episode 1" | Jessica Hobbs | Abi Morgan | 24 April 2018 | 6.89 |
Hannah represents the ex-wife of stand-up comedian Rex Pope, who has engaged in a legal battle to try to prevent him from using material referencing her in his new stand-up arena tour. She also takes on one of her mother's former clients, Davey McKenzie, who has initiated divorce proceedings against wife Goldie after more than twenty years of marriage. Hannah's long-lost father, Oscar, returns after a thirty-year absence to reclaim his stake in the family business.
| 2 | 2 | "Episode 2" | Jessica Hobbs | Abi Morgan | 1 May 2018 | 5.62 |
Hannah tries to negotiate the pre-nup of Premier League footballer Diallo Diapo, who has a chequered history of adultery, but proceedings are hindered by the arrival of Diallo's lawyer, who just happens to be Christie's pregnant ex-wife Lauren Brooker. Meanwhile, Oscar tries to win back the affection of his children by wining and dining them at a upmarket London hotel, and the McKenzie divorce grows increasingly bitter when further revelations boil to the surface.
| 3 | 3 | "Episode 3" | Jessica Hobbs | Abi Morgan and Jane Eden | 8 May 2018 | 5.38 |
Hannah represents Jaynie Lee, a high-flying businesswoman whose frozen embryos are under threat from her husband as deliberations over their divorce settlement threaten to turn ugly. Goldie discovers that Davey has an illegitimate child that he fathered ten years ago. Oscar's return continues to drive a wedge into the Defoe family dynamic. Nathan drunkenly tries to accost Nina after revealing that he no longer has sex with Hannah. After losing her engagement ring, Rose finds herself in a compromising position with vicar Glen.
| 4 | 4 | "Episode 4" | Jessica Hobbs | Abi Morgan | 15 May 2018 | 5.26 |
The marriage of foreign secretary Emma Graham and her husband Bill threatens to collapse when a 'wikileaks' style data breach of the names of members of an extra-marital affairs website threatens to reach the tabloids. Ruth holds a dinner party in celebration of Rose's impending nuptials, but the evening descends into disaster when a drunken Nina fails to watch her mouth and berates both Rose and Nathan for their marital indiscretions.
| 5 | 5 | "Episode 5" | Jessica Hobbs | Abi Morgan and Louise Ironside | 22 May 2018 | 5.69 |
Rose's engagement to James is left in tatters and Hannah struggles to pick up the pieces of her own marriage as the fallout from Nina's revelations continue. Nina discovers that the family business is effectively bankrupt and urges Ruth to sell while the market is still viable. Goldie turns down a settlement offer from Davey, but events take an unexpected turn when the pair end up spending the night together. Nina turns to Rex Pope for comfort, while Hannah is forced to confront her feelings for Christie after discovering that Nathan's indiscretions amount to more than just signing up to a dating website.
| 6 | 6 | "Episode 6" | Jessica Hobbs | Abi Morgan | 29 May 2018 | 5.54 |
D-Day arrives for the McKenzies as their bitter divorce finally comes to a head, but Hannah is left torn between her head and her heart after learning that her winning the case could potentially spark the end of Defoes. James and Rose's wedding day goes off without a hitch, but after learning that Christie is to take up a new job in Chicago, the celebrations force Hannah to finally make a decision about the future of her marriage.

=== Series 2 (2020) ===
| No. overall | No. in season | Title | Directed by | Written by | Original release date | U.K viewers (millions) |
|---|---|---|---|---|---|---|
| 7 | 1 | "Episode 1" | Paula Van Der Oest | Abi Morgan | 11 February 2020 | 6.46 |
| 8 | 2 | "Episode 2" | Paula Van Der Oest | Abi Morgan | 18 February 2020 | 4.82 |
| 9 | 3 | "Episode 3" | Paula Van Der Oest | Abi Morgan and Matt Jones | 25 February 2020 | 4.61 |
| 10 | 4 | "Episode 4" | Joss Agnew | Abi Morgan and Matt Jones | 2 March 2020 | 4.99 |
| 11 | 5 | "Episode 5" | Joss Agnew | Abi Morgan | 10 March 2020 | 5.46 |
| 12 | 6 | "Episode 6" | Joss Agnew | Abi Morgan | 17 March 2020 | 5.76 |

=== Series 3 (2022) ===
| No. overall | No. in series | Title | Directed by | Written by | Original release date | U.K viewers (millions) |
|---|---|---|---|---|---|---|
| 13 | 1 | "Episode 1" | Dee Koppang O’Leary | Abi Morgan | 4 April 2022 | 4.62 |
Hannah meets Nathan’s new girlfriend Kate. Liv brings her boyfriend Gael home. Ruth has started a podcast about marriage and divorce called LoveCast. Nina is still continuing her affair with Tyler. James is hit by a car while on his bike. He is pronounced dead.
| 14 | 2 | "Episode 2" | Dee Koppang O’Leary | Abi Morgan | 11 April 2022 | 4.17 |
The family prepares for James's funeral and it is revealed that James’s heart has been donated. Nathan tells Hannah about Kate’s pregnancy. Rose visits the police station to get James’s bike and phone. The Defoes attend Kate’s book launch. Ruth calls Christie and asks him to come back to London.
| 15 | 3 | "Episode 3" | Dee Koppang O’Leary | Abi Morgan | 18 April 2022 | 4.04 |
Christie returns to London and checks in to a hotel. Nina and Tyler decide to buy a house together. Still grieving, Rose donates James’s clothes to the church. Kate meets Nathan’s children at their home and cooks for them; Olivia deduces Kate’s pregnancy and walks out on them and gets drunk; this causes further friction between Hannah and Kate. Ronnie proposes to Ruth. Christie and Hannah sleep together at his hotel.
| 16 | 4 | "Episode 4" | Abi Morgan | Abi Morgan | 25 April 2022 | 4.26 |
Christie and Hannah continue sleeping at the hotel; Christie proposes that Hannah move with him to New York. Ruth reveals Tyler’s frauds to Zander. Nathan and Hannah negotiate the division of their assets in the presence of their lawyers. Rose babysits the priest’s children.
| 17 | 5 | "Episode 5" | Abi Morgan and Dee Koppang O’Leary | Abi Morgan | 2 May 2022 | 4.20 |
The Defoes, Ronnie, Gael and Nathan go on a family camping trip. Rose grapples with James’s absence at the trip. Ruth on learning about Nina’s and Tyler’s affairs informs Nina about Tyler’s frauds. Nina returns home and finds Tyler gone with all her money. Returning back from the trip Nathan and Hannah spend the night in the van; Kate sees them together in the morning creating misunderstandings between her and Nathan. Zander, devastated by Tyler’s deception, takes a break from work making Hannah the managerial head of the firm in his absence. Nina gives her resignation letter to Zander which he refuses to accept yet.
| 18 | 6 | "Episode 6" | Dee Koppang O’Leary | Abi Morgan | 9 May 2022 | 4.27 |
Nathan has second thoughts about his divorce. Hannah visits Kate informing her that she is ready to accept her in their family. Hannah and Nathan decide to go through the divorce amiably, without the presence of lawyers, dividing the assets between the two. Kate bonds with Nathan’s children. Zander returns the resignation letter to Nina asking her not to leave the firm. Rose pays a visit to the recipient of James’s heart. Hannah calls Christie and tells him that she loves him but she can’t leave behind her family and move to New York with him, so she tells him to think about moving back to London to be with her. Ronnie and Ruth finally get married. Nathan and Kate are happy together at the wedding. The episode ends with Ruth interviewing Hannah and Nathan on her podcast.

=== Special (2024) ===
The Split briefly returned for a two-part special, set in Barcelona, Spain. The first part aired on 29 December 2024 on BBC One and the second the following night.

| No. overall | No. in series | Title | Directed by | Written by | Original release date | U.K viewers (millions) |
|---|---|---|---|---|---|---|
| 19 | 1 | "Episode 1" | Giulia Gandini | Abi Morgan | 29 December 2024 | 5.15 |
| 20 | 2 | "Episode 2" | Giulia Gandini | Abi Morgan | 30 December 2024 | 4.74 |

== Spin-off ==
On 22 February 2024, it was announced there would be a spin-off series, The Split Up, set in Manchester and to be written by Ursula Rani Sarma. In September 2024, it was announced production had been suspended amid creative issues, though the BBC reaffirmed commitment to producing the series. Filming later took place in Manchester in October 2025.
