= The Split Up =

British legal drama television series

- Genre: Legal drama
- Created by: Ursula Rani Sarma
- Based on: The Split by Abi Morgan
- Starring: Ritu Arya; Sanjeev Bhaskar; Aysha Kala; Arian Nik; Danny Ashok; Shalini Peiris; Dimitri Leonidas; Mawaan Rizwan; Sindhu Vee
- Music by: Nainita Desai
- Country of origin: United Kingdom
- Original language: English
- No. of series: 1
- No. of episodes: 6

Production
- Executive producers: Abi Morgan; Ursula Rani Sarma; Jane Featherstone; Bryony Arnold
- Producers: Natasha Romaniuk; Lucy Richer
- Running time: 58 minutes
- Production companies: Sister; Little Chick

Original release
- Network: BBC One
- Release: 20 September 2026 – present

Related
- The Split

The Split Up is a British legal drama television series created by Ursula Rani Sarma, which began broadcasting on BBC One from 20 September 2026. It is a spin-off from the British series The Split. In October 2026, it was renewed for a second series.

== Premise ==
Set in Manchester, the series centres around a British Asian family firm of family-law lawyers.

== Cast and characters ==
=== The Kishan family ===
- Sanjeev Bhaskar as Dhruv Kishan, director of Kishan Law and father of the Kishan siblings
- Ritu Arya as Aria Kishan
- Aysha Kala as Maya Kishan
- Arian Nik as Kav Kishan
- Danny Ashok as Neal Sharma, Aria's fiancé
- Sindhu Vee as Harshika Sharma, Neal's mother and the Kishans' family friend
- Tom Forbes as Michael Lanigan, Maya's husband

=== Friends and colleagues of the Kishans ===
- Dimitri Leonidas as Luke Christos, a new hire at Kishan Law
- Debbie Rush as Linda Taylor
- Shalini Peiris as Zoya Bassu, a Dehli-born lawyer with a mysterious past, who also finds herself involved in high profile cases in Manchester
- Mawaan Rizwan as Ashok Khan, an online influencer and Kav's love interest

=== Guest stars ===
- Victoria Ekanoye as Ginny (Episodes 1 and 3)
- Jane Horrocks as Tash Edwards (Episode 1)
- Lenny Henry as Alex Edwards (Episode 1)
- Jameela Jamil as Nisha Mantri (Episode 2)
- Adam Woodward as Shaun Anderson (Episode 2)
- Niamh Walsh as Amanda Redford (Episode 3)
- Ramon Tikaram as Rhik Dasani, the Kishan siblings' maternal uncle (Episodes 4 and 6)
- Charlie De Melo as Vivek Gupta (Episodes 5 and 6)

== Episodes ==
No.	Title	Directed by	Written by	Original release date (Note: All six episodes were released on BBC iPlayer on 20 September 2026.)
1	"Episode 1"	Shamim Sarif	Ursula Rani Sarma	20 September 2026
2	"Episode 2"	Shamim Sarif	Ursula Rani Sarma	21 September 2026
3	"Episode 3"	Shamim Sarif	Sumerah Srivastav; Ursula Rani Sarma	27 September 2026
4	"Episode 4"	Khurrum M. Sultan	Kaamil Shah	28 September 2026
5	"Episode 5"	Khurrum M. Sultan	Sonali Bhattacharyya	4 October 2026
6	"Episode 6"	Khurrum M. Sultan	Ursula Rani Sarma	5 October 2026

== Production ==
The series is created by Ursula Rani Sarma and produced by Sister in association with Little Chick. Commissioned for BBC One in February 2024, it is a spin-off from BBC One series The Split, created by Abi Morgan. The series was initially set to commence filming in October 2024 but the shoot was suspended a month prior for editorial reasons. Abi Morgan is an executive producer, alongside Ursula Rani Sarma, Jane Featherstone, and Bryony Arnold.

The cast is led by Ritu Arya and Sanjeev Bhaskar and includes Aysha Kala, Arian Nik, Danny Ashok, Dimitri Leonidas, Mawaan Rizwan, Sindhu Vee, Shalini Peiris, and Tom Forbes, as well as guest appearances from Lenny Henry, Jameela Jamil, Victoria Ekanoye and Jane Horrocks.

Filming took place in Manchester in October 2025.

== Release ==
The series started airing from 20 September 2026, and continued on Sunday and Monday nights on BBC One, with the finale scheduled for Monday, 5 October.
