= Moy House, County Clare =

Country house in County Clare, Ireland

Coordinates: 52°55′0″N 9°20′56″W

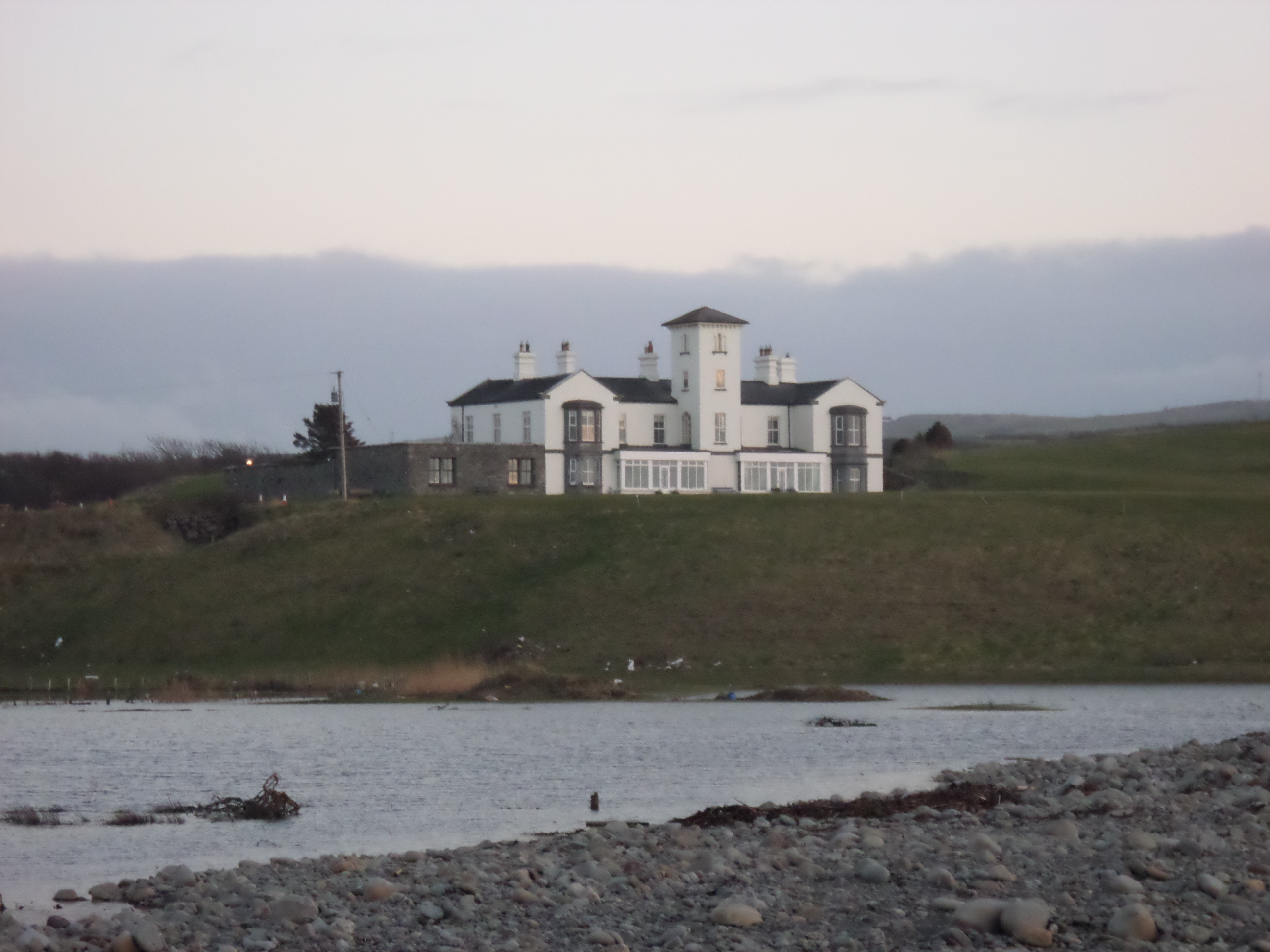
Moy House from the seaside

Moy House is a Georgian country house hotel in County Clare, Ireland, about 3 kilometres (1.9 mi) south of Lahinch off the N67 road near the village of Moy.

== History ==
Originally set in 15 acres of woodland on the River Moy, it was built in the mid 18th century as the holiday home of Sir Augustine Fitzgerald. Later it was sold to Major Studdert, who gave his name to the bridges over the road and the river in the West Clare Railway. The house was vacant for 10 years, but was purchased by Odran O'Looney who undertook a three-year restoration of the property.

It was voted Country House of the Year by Georgina Campbell's Ireland in 2003. In the Irish TV drama series "Smother", which premiered in March, 2021, the house served as the Ahern family's home.

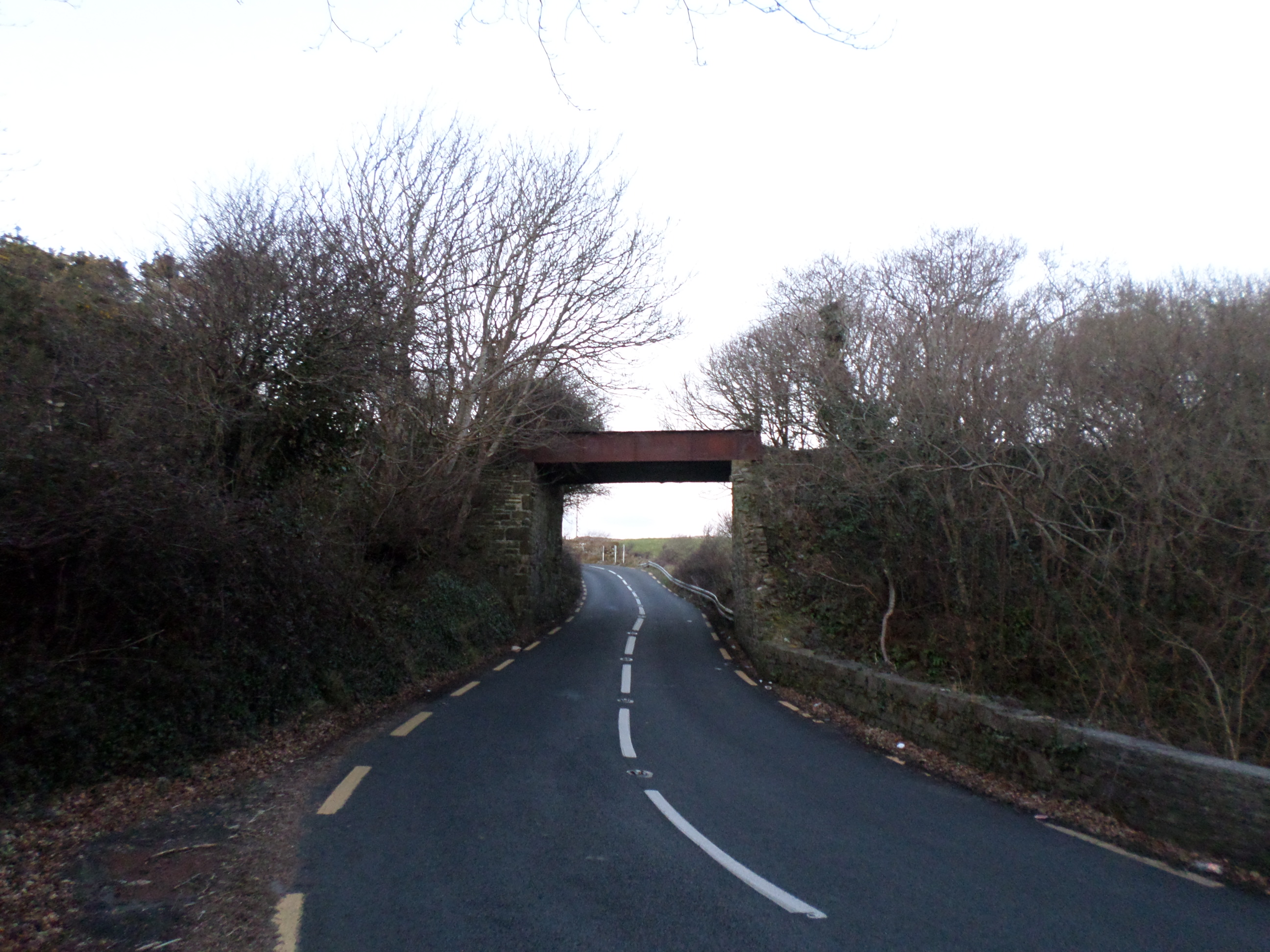
"Majors Bridge", a bridge in the West Clare Railway spanning the N67, named after Major Studdert, occupant of the nearby demesne of Moy House.

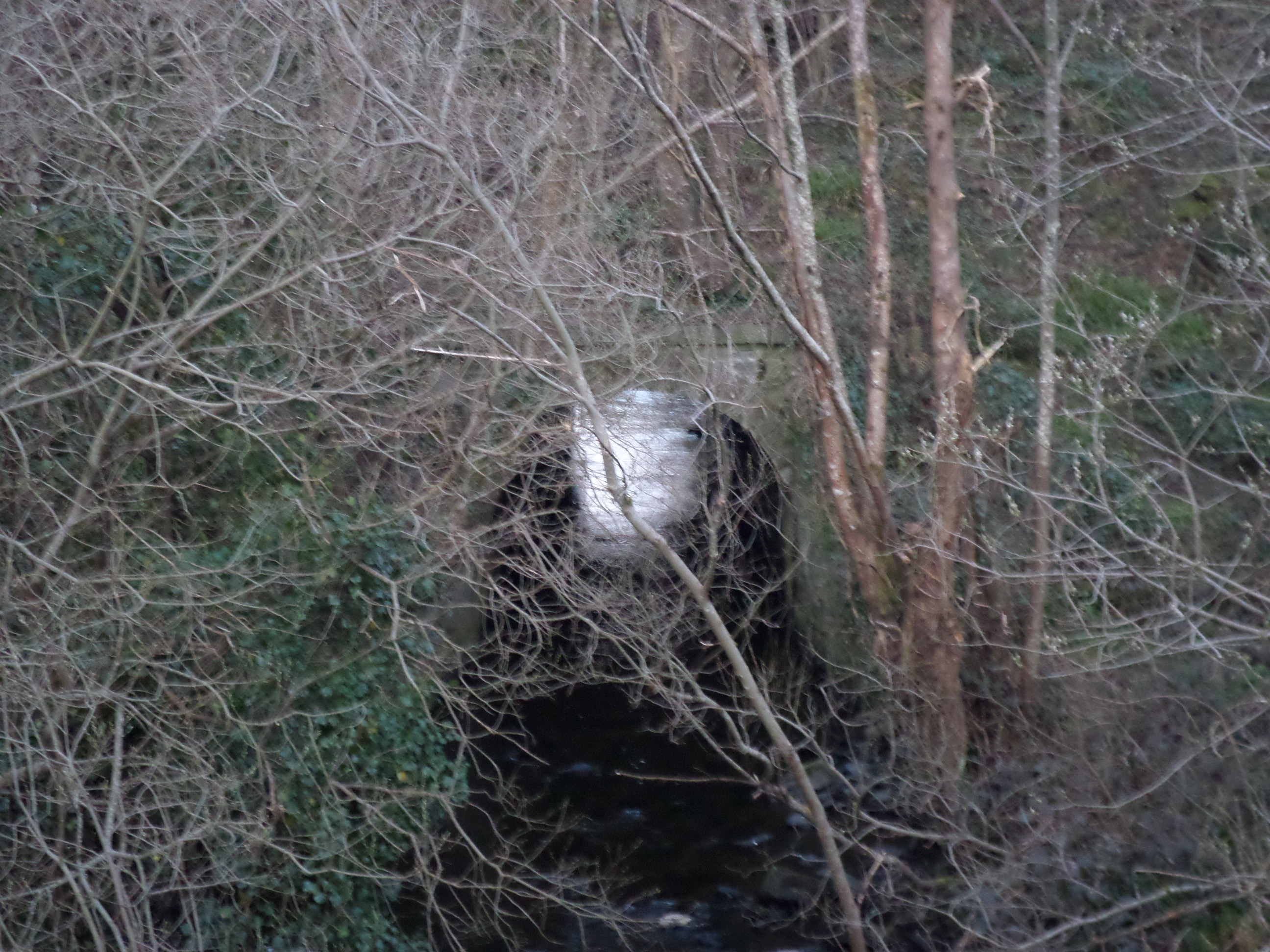
The Moy River passing the embankment of the West Clare Railway towards the N67, Moy House and the sea.
