= Ayoola Smart =

Irish actress (born 1994)

- Born: 19 March 1994 (age 32); Schull, County Cork, Ireland
- Education: Schull Community College
- Occupation: Actress
- Years active: 2017–present
- Mother: Sally Smart

Ayoola Smart (born 19 March 1994) is an Irish actress. She is known for her role in Killing Eve and for playing Aviendha in the TV series Wheel of Time.

Her other credits include the movie Juliet, Naked, the Irish series Smother, and the movie Cocaine Bear. She trained East 15 Acting School in Loughton, Essex.

== Filmography ==
- 2023: The Wheel of Time - Aviendha
- 2023: Baldur's Gate III - Human Combat Vocals
- 2023: Cocaine Bear - Officer Reba
- 2021–2022: Smother - Cathy Cregan
- 2021: Death in Paradise - Cassie Dujon
- 2021: Magpie - Maggie
- 2020: Mi O Le Ku (Survival) - Stephanie
- 2020: Killing Eve - Audrey
- 2018: Les Misérables - Zéphine
- 2018: Juliet, Naked - Lizzie
- 2017: Trendy - Cybil
- 2017: Vera - Lucy Curran
- 2017: Holby City - Frankie Ware
