= Arian Nik =

English actor (born 1994)

- Born: Arian Mirzaali; 4 November 1994 (age 32); Leeds, England
- Education: Mountview Academy of Theatre Arts
- Years active: 2016–present

Arian Mirzaali (born 4 November 1994), known professionally as Arian Nik, is an British actor and writer. On television, he starred in the ITVX horror sitcom Count Abdulla (2023) and the BBC One series The Split Up (2026).

== Early life ==
Nik was born in Leeds and is of Iranian descent. Raised by a single mother, he and his mother stayed at a Women's Aid Hostel before getting a council flat in Meanwood. Nik attended Roundhay Comprehensive School. He also took classes with the Television Workshop. He was originally going to study Broadcast Journalism at university, but instead convinced his parents to let him go to drama school. Nik graduated with a Bachelor of Arts in Acting from Mountview Academy of Theatre Arts in 2016, and served on the board of Mountview until 2019.

== Career ==
Nik began his career in theatre, playing Remedial Remedies at Upstairs at The Gatehouse in 2016. That same year, he voiced Ammar Elkady for the Doctor Who audio drama Absolute Power from Big Finish Productions. This was followed by roles in The Ugly One at the Park Theatre and The Last Testament of Lillian Bilocca at Hull Truck Theatre in 2017, The Village at Theatre Royal Stratford East in 2018, and Pufferfish for the 2019 VAULT Festival. He co-developed Cracked for the Arcola Theatre.

Also in 2019, Nik made his television debut with guest appearances in the BBC spy thriller Killing Eve as Jay and the Channel 4 teen drama Ackley Bridge as Yusef Ibrahim. This was followed by his feature film debut in 2020 with small roles in the Disney adaptation of Artemis Fowl and the Irish comedy-drama Dating Amber. He also appeared in an episode of the BBC soap opera Doctors as Hamed Khan.

In 2021, Nik joined the cast of the ITV crime drama The Bay for its second series as Theo Anvari and the CBBC spinoff Still So Awkward as Josh Cooper. He appeared in the 2022 drama film Allelujah and was nominated for the 2022 Offie for Lead Performance in a Play - Kabul Goes Pop. After protesting in person in London, Nik wrote an article for BRICKS Magazine that November to spread awareness about the death of Mahsa Amini and its aftermath.

As of 2023, Nik leads the ITVX comedy horror series Count Abdulla as titular character Abdulla Khan, a Muslim doctor who gets bitten by a vampire (Jaime Winstone). The following year, he had a role as Nish Chowdry in the ensemble of the thriller Passenger, also for ITVX.

== Personal life ==
Nik lives in London with his long-term partner.

== Filmography ==
=== Film ===
Year	Title	Role	Notes
2013	No Regrets	Tom	Short film
2020	Artemis Fowl	Kanker	
2020	Dating Amber	Adam	
2022	The Bower	Jude	Short film
2022	Allelujah	Abdul Kashani	
2024	The Beekeeper	Tommy	
2025	Giant	Riath Hamed	

=== Television ===
Year	Title	Role	Notes
2019	Killing Eve	Jay	Episode: "Smell Ya Later"
2019	Ackley Bridge	Yusef Ibrahim	Episode: "3.6"
2020	Van der Valk	Kalari Ramecker	Episode: "Love in Amsterdam"
2020	Doctors	Hamed Khan	Episode: "Rejection"
2021	The Bay	Theo Anvari	3 episodes
2021	Still So Awkward	Josh Cooper	Main role; 12 episodes
2023	Count Abdulla	Abdulla Khan	Main role; 6 episodes
2024	Passenger	Nish Chowdry	Main role; 6 episodes
2024–present	Daddy Issues	Xander	9 episodes
2025	Film Club	Kamran	4 episodes
2026	The Split Up	Kav Kishan	6 episodes
2026	It Gets Worse	Jesse	2 episodes

== Stage ==
Year	Title	Role	Notes
2016	Remedial Remedies	Jack	Upstairs at The Gatehouse, London
2017	The Ugly One	Karlmann	Park Theatre, London
2017	The Last Testament of Lillian Bilocca	Terry Smallbone	Hull Truck Theatre, Kingston upon Hull
2018	The Village	Mekhal	Theatre Royal Stratford East
2018	Cracked	—N/a	Arcola Theatre, London; Co-developed
2019	Pufferfish	Chris	Stadsschouwburg, Amsterdam / VAULT Festival
2022	Kabul Goes Pop: Music Television Afghanistan	Farook	Brixton House, London / England tour
2022	Sokhan Begoo	Various	Royal Court Theatre, London
2023	Blue Mist	Rashid	Royal Court Theatre, London
2025	Speed	Sameer	Bush Theatre, London

== Audio ==
Year	Title	Role	Notes
2016	Doctor Who: Absolute Power	Ammar Elkady	Big Finish Productions

== Awards and nominations ==
Year	Award	Category	Work	Result	Ref.
2021	Apolo Awards	Best Ensemble Cast	Dating Amber	Nominated	(Note: Shared with Dating Amber cast.)
2022	Offie	Lead Performance in a Play	Kabul Goes Pop	Nominated	
