= The Sharp Project =

Flexible hosting space in Manchester

- Type of project: Profit for purpose
- Owner: Manchester City Council
- Founder: Sue Woodward
- Established: 2011
- Website: www.thesharpproject.co.uk

The Sharp Project is a Manchester space hosting flexible office, production and event space. It is based in a 200,000 square feet (19,000 m^{2}) refurbished warehouse previously occupied by electronics company Sharp.

Manchester City Council purchased the former warehouse owned by the Sharp Corporation in 2006 for £6.1 million and decided to keep the Sharp name for the new development. The development of the facility was headed by Sue Woodward, former Managing Director at the Granada Television franchise.

== Facilities ==
The £16.5 million profit-for-purpose development is owned by Manchester City Council. Completed in June 2011, it was funded by Manchester City Council, the Northwest Regional Development Agency (NWDA) and the European Regional Development Fund. Manchester has the second-largest cluster of creative and media industries in Europe.

Creative digital agency and social enterprise SharpFutures is located at The Sharp Project.

== History ==
In February 2011, Tiger Aspect Productions selected The Sharp Project to film a comedy series, Mount Pleasant, for Sky One.

In 2011, Lime Pictures and Objective Productions filmed Fresh Meat, a comedy for Channel 4 based on a group of students and their experiences at their first year at university. In 2015 Objective Productions filmed the fourth and final series of Fresh Meat at The Sharp Project. Sky TV's Brassic is partly filmed and has its production offices here.
