= Worried About the Boy =

2010 television film directed by Julian Jarrold

- British DVD cover
- Written by: Tony Basgallop
- Directed by: Julian Jarrold
- Starring: Douglas Booth; Marc Warren; Freddie Fox; Mathew Horne
- Country of origin: United Kingdom
- Original language: English

Production
- Producer: Matthew Bird
- Cinematography: Tony Slater-Ling
- Editor: Emma E. Hickox
- Running time: 87 minutes
- Production company: Red Production Company

Original release
- Network: BBC Two
- Release: 16 May 2010

Worried About the Boy is a 2010 British biographical drama television film directed by Julian Jarrold and written by Tony Basgallop, based on the life of English singer Boy George. It stars Douglas Booth as Boy George and Mathew Horne as his lover Jon Moss. It aired on BBC Two on 16 May 2010 as part of the channel's Eighties Season.

== Plot ==
In 1980, young George O'Dowd (Boy George) argues with his parents over his femininity and moves into a squat with Peter, who dresses as Marilyn Monroe and calls himself Marilyn. They make themselves known at Steve Strange's trendy Blitz Club where George gets a job in the cloakroom. George is unlucky in his relationships with men until he meets musician Kirk Brandon. Through Kirk, George meets the handsome drummer Jon Moss, on whom he develops a crush.

Sacked by the Blitz and spurned by Kirk, George turns to Sex Pistols manager Malcolm McLaren to further his music career. George's spell with McLaren's group Bow Wow Wow is cut short when the rest of the group reveal to McLaren how much they hate George, but fan Mikey Craig is impressed and asks George to sing in a group he is forming, where George again meets Jon Moss. They have an affair and their group Culture Club becomes very successful. Four years later, however, hounded by the tabloid press amid stories of his drug addiction, an unhappy George turns to Jon for advice on his future.

== Main cast ==
- Douglas Booth as Boy George
- Mathew Horne as Jon Moss
- Mark Gatiss as Malcolm McLaren
- Dean Fagan as Mikey Craig
- Marc Warren as Steve Strange
- Freddie Fox as Marilyn
- Francis Magee as Jerry O'Dowd
- Richard Madden as Kirk Brandon
- Jonny Burt as Roy Hay
- Isabel Ford as Mrs. Brandon
- Hannah Harford as Sarah
- Julian Jarrold as Director
- Elizabeth Lowe as Caroline
- Natalie O'Brien as Emily
- Nicola Potts as Dawn
- Suzanne Nichole Preston as Mo
- Daniel Wallace as Christopher
- Charlie Anson as Vernon (uncredited)
- Andy Quine as Career Advisor (uncredited)
