= Smother (TV series) =

Irish thriller TV series

- Genre: Crime; Drama; Thriller
- Written by: Kate O'Riordan; Tom Farrelly; Daniel Cullen; Ursula Rani Sarma; Sonya Kelly; Sinéad Collopy; Nessa Wrafter; Marcus Fleming
- Directed by: Dathaí Keane
- Starring: Dervla Kirwan; Gemma-Leah Devereux; Seána Kerslake; Niamh Walsh; Justine Mitchell
- Composer: John McPhillips
- Country of origin: Ireland
- Original language: English
- No. of series: 3
- No. of episodes: 18

Production
- Executive producers: Michael Parke; Kate O'Riordan; Tom Sherry
- Producers: Rebecca O'Flanagan; Robert Walpole
- Production locations: Lahinch, County Clare, Ireland
- Cinematography: Cathal Watters
- Editors: Dermot Diskin, John O'Connor
- Production companies: BBC Studios Drama Productions; Raidió Teilifís Éireann; Treasure Entertainment

Original release
- Network: RTÉ One
- Release: 7 March 2021 – 12 March 2023

Smother is an Irish thriller drama television series written by Kate O'Riordan and directed by Dathaí Keane. It stars Dervla Kirwan as Val Ahern, a mother who is determined to protect her family at any cost. The series is produced by BBC Studios and Treasure Entertainment for Raidió Teilifís Éireann, and premiered on 7 March 2021 on RTÉ One. A second series was announced in April 2021 and had its premiere on RTÉ One on 9 January 2022. It aired in the UK by Alibi in June 2021. The show then premiered on Peacock in the US on July 1, 2021. The second season premiered on April 28, 2022. The series airs in Norway on TV2. In August 2022, it was confirmed that the series would end at the end of the third season. The third and final series began airing on 6 February 2023.

== Plot (series 1) ==
Set in a small town on the wild and rugged coast of County Clare, Val Ahern, a devoted mother, is determined to protect her family and particularly her three daughters—Jenny, Anna and Grace—at any cost. When Val's husband Denis is found dead at the foot of a cliff near their home the morning after a family party, Val attempts to investigate the events that unfolded the night before.

== Cast ==
=== Main ===
- Dervla Kirwan as Val Ahern
- Gemma-Leah Devereux as Anna Ahern
- Seána Kerslake as Grace Ahern
- Niamh Walsh as Jenny Ahern
- Justine Mitchell as Elaine Lynch
- Dean Fagan as Finn Ahern (series 2 & 3)

=== Supporting ===
- Stuart Graham as Denis Ahern
- Conor Mullen as Frank Ahern
- Hilary Rose as Alanna Hutchins
- Kevin McGahern as Michael Foley
- Michael Patric as Sgt. Paudie Manning
- Thomas Levin as Carl Jensen
- Hazel Doupe as Ingrid Jensen
- Lochlann O'Mearáin as Rory Dwyer
- Éanna Hardwicke as Joe Ryan
- James O'Donoghue as Calum Dwyer
- Elijah O'Sullivan as Jacob Dwyer
- Ayoola Smart as Cathy Cregan
- Carrie Crowley as Mairead Noonan
- Jason O'Mara as Paul Madigan (series 3)
- Fionnula Flanagan as Caro Noonan (series 3)
- Rebecca O'Mara as Sheahan (series 3)

== Episodes ==
=== Series overview ===
Series	Episodes	Originally released	
Series	Episodes	First released	Last released
1	6	7 March 2021	11 April 2021
2	6	9 January 2022	13 February 2022
3	6	5 February 2023	12 March 2023

=== Series 1 (2021) ===
No. overall	No. in series	Title	Directed by	Written by	Original release date
1	1	"Episode 1"	Dathaí Keane	Kate O'Riordan	7 March 2021
2	2	"Episode 2"	Dathaí Keane	Kate O'Riordan	14 March 2021
3	3	"Episode 3"	Dathaí Keane	Tom Farrelly	21 March 2021
4	4	"Episode 4"	Dathaí Keane	Daniel Cullen	28 March 2021
5	5	"Episode 5"	Dathaí Keane	Ursula Rani Sarma	4 April 2021
6	6	"Episode 6"	Dathaí Keane	Tom Farrelly	11 April 2021

=== Series 2 (2022) ===
No. overall	No. in series	Title	Directed by	Written by	Original release date
7	1	"Episode 1"	Dathaí Keane	Kate O'Riordan	9 January 2022
8	2	"Episode 2"	Dathaí Keane	Kate O'Riordan	16 January 2022
9	3	"Episode 3"	Dathaí Keane	Tom Farrelly	23 January 2022
10	4	"Episode 4"	Dathaí Keane	Sonya Kelly	30 January 2022
11	5	"Episode 5"	Dathaí Keane	Ursula Rani Sarma	6 February 2022
12	6	"Episode 6"	Dathaí Keane	Tom Farrelly	13 February 2022

=== Series 3 (2023) ===
No. overall	No. in series	Title	Directed by	Written by	Original release date
13	1	"Episode 1"	Dathaí Keane	Kate O'Riordan	5 February 2023
14	2	"Episode 2"	Dathaí Keane	Kate O'Riordan	12 February 2023
15	3	"Episode 3"	Dathaí Keane	Sonya Kelly	19 February 2023
16	4	"Episode 4"	Dathaí Keane	Sinéad Collopy	26 February 2023
17	5	"Episode 5"	Dathaí Keane	Nessa Wrafter	5 March 2023
18	6	"Episode 6"	Dathaí Keane	Marcus Fleming	12 March 2023

== Production ==
Filming began in February 2020, in and around Lahinch, County Clare, Ireland. Moy House, a Georgian country house, located about 3 kilometers (1.9 miles) south of Lahinch, served as the Ahern family's home in the series. On the series' way of writing and storytelling, lead actress Dervla Kirwan said that "it's been a long time since anything this well written about an Irish family has come my way. In Smother, [Kate O'Riordan] has created a riveting thriller that will wake the world up to contemporary Ireland and rewrite an outdated narrative that has been peddled about the Irish for years." She also relates the series' setting to the character in the series, in particular to the Ahern family:

Even if you just look at their beautiful house, which is also a character in our story — it dominates the skyline, the horizon of that village. It's all about corruption, privilege and wealth, and how that breeds a dysfunction. That dysfunction acts as a poison, creating a sense of entitlement in those women. They lie and cheat to get what they want, and their behaviour's upheld by their privilege. They're all a piece of work, as we'd say in Ireland. They're all quite dark, really damaged women.

In March 2020, production was halted due to social restrictions being imposed nationwide to combat the spread of the COVID-19 pandemic. On the filming halt, cast member Niamh Walsh states:

Actors are basically idiot children. We blunder round the world feeling feelings for money – those of us who are lucky enough to get paid to do it. Sure, we'll sell you the fear or excitement or whatever hanging off the cliff edge requires, but we are absolutely the last step in the process. Before any of those feelings can be caught on camera, this invisible army has to mobilise to make it happen.

On 4 April 2021, it was revealed that comedian Kevin McGahern has joined the cast in episode 5, portraying Michael Foley.

On 26 December 2021, it was announced that former Coronation Street star Dean Fagan will be starring as Denis Ahern's estranged son in the show's second series.

== Awards and nominations ==
Award	Date of ceremony	Category	Nominee(s)	Result
IFTA Film & Drama Awards	4 July 2021	Best Drama	Production Team	Nominated
IFTA Film & Drama Awards	4 July 2021	Best Director – Drama	Dathaí Keane	Nominated
IFTA Film & Drama Awards	4 July 2021	Best Script – Drama	Kate O'Riordan	Nominated
IFTA Film & Drama Awards	4 July 2021	Best Actress	Dervla Kirwan	Won
IFTA Film & Drama Awards	4 July 2021	Best Supporting Actress	Gemma-Leah Devereux	Nominated
IFTA Film & Drama Awards	4 July 2021	Best Supporting Actress	Seána Kerslake	Nominated
IFTA Film & Drama Awards	4 July 2021	Best Supporting Actor	Éanna Hardwicke	Nominated
IFTA Film & Drama Awards	4 July 2021	Best Score	John McPhillips	Nominated
IFTA Film & Drama Awards	4 July 2021	Best Cinematography	Cathal Watters	Nominated
IFTA Film & Drama Awards	4 July 2021	Best Costume	Triona Lillis	Nominated
IFTA Film & Drama Awards	4 July 2021	Best Sound	Hugh Fox, Fionán Higgins & Mark Henry	Nominated
IFTA Film & Drama Awards	12 March 2022	Best Drama	Production Team	Nominated
IFTA Film & Drama Awards	12 March 2022	Best Director – Drama	Dathaí Keane	Nominated
IFTA Film & Drama Awards	12 March 2022	Best Script – Drama	Kate O'Riordan	Nominated
IFTA Film & Drama Awards	12 March 2022	Best Actress	Dervla Kirwan	Nominated
IFTA Film & Drama Awards	12 March 2022	Best Supporting Actress	Justine Mitchell	Nominated
IFTA Film & Drama Awards	12 March 2022	Best Sound	John "Bob" Brennan, Fionán Higgins, Mark Henry, & Andrew Kirwan	Nominated
RTS Republic of Ireland Awards	12 April 2022	Drámaíocht / Drama	Smother	Won
RTS Republic of Ireland Awards	28 March 2023	Drámaíocht / Drama	Smother	Nominated
IFTA Film & Drama Awards	7 May 2023	Best Drama	Production Team	Nominated
IFTA Film & Drama Awards	7 May 2023	Best Director – Drama	Dathaí Keane	Nominated
IFTA Film & Drama Awards	7 May 2023	Best Script – Drama	Kate O'Riordan	Nominated
IFTA Film & Drama Awards	7 May 2023	Best Actress	Dervla Kirwan	Nominated
IFTA Film & Drama Awards	7 May 2023	Best Actor	Jason O'Mara	Nominated
