= Fiona Button =

British actress

- Born: 1984 or 1985 (age 41–42); Lausanne, Switzerland
- Education: Webber Douglas Academy of Dramatic Art
- Occupation: Actress
- Years active: 2007–present
- Spouse: Henry Fleet (m. 2014)
- Children: 1

Fiona Button (born 1984/1985) is an English actress. She is best known for playing Tess Roberts in Lip Service (2010–2012) and Rose Defoe in The Split (2018–2024).

== Early life and education ==
Button was born in Lausanne, Switzerland, and grew up in Newbury, Berkshire.

She made her professional stage debut at the Watermill Theatre in Newbury aged 10 in the Wizard of Oz. She attended Park House School and the sixth form of St. Bartholomew's School. She studied drama at the University of Birmingham before enrolling at the Webber Douglas Academy of Dramatic Art, graduating in 2007.

== Career ==
=== Television ===
After graduating, Button played parts in Midsomer Murders and The Bill. In 2008, she played Lucy Bedford in The Palace. From 2010 to 2012 she played Tess Roberts in two series of Lip Service. From 2014 to 2016 she played Jennifer Chambers in series 1 and 2 of Grantchester. In 2018, she was cast as Rose Defoe in the BBC series The Split.

Button has made guest appearances in How Not to Live Your Life, Outcasts, Foyle's War, Cardinal Burns, Pramface, You, Me and the Apocalypse and as Vera in My Mother and Other Strangers.

=== Theatre ===
Button made her West End debut in 2007 in Rock 'n' Roll by Tom Stoppard playing young Esme and Alice. In 2009 she appeared in Madame de Sade for the Donmar Warehouse opposite Judi Dench and Rosamund Pike, then as Sonya in Vanya at the Gate Theatre. In 2010 she played Rachel in the original cast of Posh at the Royal Court Theatre, then Mabel Chiltern in An Ideal Husband at the Vaudeville Theatre.

In 2013 Button originated the role of Wendy in Wendy and Peter Pan for the Royal Shakespeare Company. Written by Ella Hickson, it is a feminist reimagining of Barrie's original novel, putting Wendy 'the girl who would grow up' in the spotlight. The show became a sell out hit and the production was revived in 2015.

In 2014 Button went on to play Annabella in 'Tis Pity She's a Whore at the Globe Theatre. Dominic Maxwell from The Times said of her performance, "Button has the ability to transmit the knottiest thoughts from behind an easy, poised demeanour. She is an exceptional performer."

In 2016 she played Stef in They Drink It in the Congo at the Almeida Theatre. In 2018 she played Cecily Cardew in The Importance of Being Earnest in the West End.

== Personal life ==
Button married screenwriter Henry Fleet in 2014 and they have a daughter.

== Filmography ==
=== Film ===
Year	Title	Role	Notes
2012	We'll Take Manhattan	Lavinia	TV film
2015	Bugsplat!	Gina McCutcheon	TV film
2018	The Importance of Being Earnest	Cecily Cardew	
2021	No One Is Talking About This	Storyteller	Short film
2022	Fisherman's Friends: One and All	Petra	

=== Television ===
Year	Title	Role	Notes
2007	The Bill	Susie Matthews	Episode: "Behind Closed Doors"
2007	Midsomer Murders	Willow McKinley	Episode: "The Axeman Cometh"
2008	The Palace	Lucy Bedford	Recurring role; 5 episodes
2010	How Not to Live Your Life	Jenny	Episode: "Don's Angry Girlfriend"
2010–2012	Lip Service	Tess Roberts	Lead role; 12 episodes
2011	Outcasts	Trix	Episode: "Series 1, Episode 3"
2012	Cardinal Burns	Various roles	Series regular; 5 episodes
2013	Pramface	Gaby	Episode: "The Edge of Hell"
2013	Foyle's War	Mary Nelson	Episode: "Sunflower"
2014–2016	Grantchester	Jennifer Chambers	Recurring role; 3 episodes
2015	You, Me and the Apocalypse	Skye	Recurring role; 2 episodes
2016	My Mother and Other Strangers	Vera Curtis	Episode: "Vera"
2018–2022	The Split	Rose	Lead Role; 17 episodes
2019	Flack	Annie	Episode: "Anthony"
2020	Out of Her Mind	Lucy	Series regular; 6 episodes
2021	Trying	Sky	Episode: "Big Heads"
2023	Death in Paradise	Hannah Roberts	Episode: "Murder on the High Seas"
2024	Industry	Denise Oldroyd	series regular; 5 episodes
2024	Truelove	Kate	Series regular; 6 episodes
2025	Dope Girls	Sophie Asquith-Gore	Series regular; 6 episodes
2026	The Forsytes	Clarissa Heron	Series regular; 4 episodes

== Theatre credits ==
Year	Title	Role	Venue	Ref
2007	The Lesson	Claire	Arcola Theatre, London	
2007	World's End	Kat	The Pleasance, Edinburgh	
2007	Rock 'n' Roll	Alice/Young Esme	Duke of York's Theatre, London	
2008	Ring Round the Moon	Isabelle	Playhouse Theatre, London	
2008	Hay Fever	Sorel Bliss	Royal Exchange, Manchester	
2009	Madame de Sade	Anne	Wyndham's Theatre, London	
2009	Vanya	Sonya	Gate Theatre, London	
2010	Posh	Rachel	Royal Court Theatre, London	
2010	An Ideal Husband	Miss Mabel Chiltern	Vaudeville Theatre, London	
2012	The Girl with the Yellow Dress	Celia	Theatre503, London	
2012	Heartbreak House	Ellie Dunn	Chichester Festival Theatre, Chichester	
2013	King Lear	Cordelia	Theatre Royal, Bath	
2013	Wendy & Peter Pan	Wendy Darling	Royal Shakespeare Theatre, Stratford-upon-Avon	
2014	'Tis Pity She's a Whore	Annabella	Sam Wanamaker Playhouse, London	
2016	They Drink It in the Congo	Stef	Almeida Theatre, London	
2018	The Importance of Being Earnest	Cecily Cardew	Vaudeville Theatre, London	
2026	Arcadia	Lady Croom	Old Vic, London	
