= Count Abdulla =

British television series

- Genre: Horror; Comedy
- Created by: Kaamil Shah
- Directed by: Asim Abbasi
- Starring: Arian Nik
- Country of origin: United Kingdom
- Original language: English
- No. of seasons: 1
- No. of episodes: 6

Production
- Executive producer: Phil Gilbert
- Producer: Hussain Casey-Ahmed
- Production company: Fudge Park Productions

Original release
- Network: ITVX
- Release: 15 June 2023

Count Abdulla is a British horror comedy television series written by Kaamil Shah. It is about a British-Pakistani doctor who becomes a vampire. It premiered on ITVX on 15 June 2023 before airing on ITV2 on 21 January 2024. The series was cancelled after its first season.

== Synopsis ==
Abdulla Khan (Nik), a British-Pakistani Muslim doctor, is bitten by a vampire (Winstone). His transformation, however, is not only his problem: he's caught between the potent influence of his deeply religious mum Bushra (Wadia) and his hedonistic friends, as he tries to figure out his life.

== Cast ==
- Arian Nik as Abdulla Khan
- Jaime Winstone as Kathy
- Nina Wadia as Bushra Khan
- Manpreet Bambra as Amrita
- Sia Alipour as Shafi
- Jonny Green as Charles Ruthven
- Akshay Kumar as Rishi
- Moe Bar-El as Yazan Al Kawalti
- Mariska Ariya as Nahima
- Priya Davdra as Simran
- Rishi Nair as Majid
- Nikkita Chadha as Preethi
- Ruchika Jain as Jaswinder

== Episodes ==
| No. | Title | Directed by | Written by | Original release date | U.K. viewers (millions) |
|---|---|---|---|---|---|
| 1 | "Halaloween" | Unknown | Unknown | 15 June 2023 | N/A |
| 2 | "The Exorcism of Abdulla Khan" | Unknown | Unknown | 15 June 2023 | N/A |
| 3 | "The Lost Bhais" | Unknown | Unknown | 15 June 2023 | N/A |
| 4 | "Malika of the Damned" | Unknown | Unknown | 15 June 2023 | N/A |
| 5 | "The Red Shaadi" | Unknown | Unknown | 15 June 2023 | N/A |
| 6 | "The Shadow Over Heathrow" | Unknown | Unknown | 15 June 2023 | N/A |

== Production ==
After graduating from London Film School in 2018, Kaamil Shah cold submitted his comedy pilot for Count Abdulla. He signed with an agent, and his script was picked up by Fudge Park Productions after garnering interest. ITV officially ordered the six-part horror comedy in March 2022 for the new ITVX streaming service's comedy slate.

It was announced in August 2022 that Arian Nik and Jaime Winstone would lead the series.
