= List of Fresh Meat episodes =

Fresh Meat is a British comedy-drama series shown on Channel 4 which was created by Jesse Armstrong and Sam Bain. The plot centres on six students of the fictional Manchester Medlock University. The show stars Zawe Ashton as Vod, Greg McHugh as Howard, Kimberley Nixon as Josie, Charlotte Ritchie as Oregon, Joe Thomas as Kingsley, Jack Whitehall as JP and Faye Marsay as Candice.

The first series, released in 2011, aired on Wednesdays at 10 pm, while the second series aired on Tuesdays at 10 pm in 2012. The third series, which began running in November 2013, aired on Mondays at 10 pm. The fourth and final series began transmission in February 2016, airing on Mondays at 10pm.

== Series overview ==
Series	Episodes	Originally released		DVD released
Series	Episodes	First released	Last released	DVD released
1	8	21 September 2011	16 November 2011	8 October 2012
2	8	9 October 2012	27 November 2012	11 November 2013
3	8	4 November 2013	23 December 2013	26 December 2013
4	6	22 February 2016	28 March 2016	4 April 2016

== Episodes ==
=== Series 1 (2011) ===
No. overall	No. in series	Title	Directed by	Written by	Original release date	U.K. viewers (millions)
1	1	"Episode 1"	David Kerr	Jesse Armstrong & Sam Bain	21 September 2011	2.09
Five new students arrive at Manchester Medlock University to share a house. The girls are the sweet-natured Josie, streetwise and forthright Vod, and Oregon, who is anxious to appear cool. The boys are JP, an ex-Stowe public schoolboy who failed to get into a good university and tends to look down on people, and kind-hearted Kingsley, off the leash at last after years of caring for his sick mother. Already in residence is Howard, a Scotsman of indeterminate age who seems to have lived at the house longer than a second-year student should. At the pub Kingsley thinks he has scored with attractive Rachel (Emma Rigby), only to discover that she is recruiting for a Christian group. Josie is attracted to him but she has a one-night stand with JP, not knowing that they will be sharing a house. Once the term has started, Oregon argues with her English tutor Professor Tony Shales, though Vod claimed ownership of her essay. Howard is happy that he now has some friends and is no longer a social outcast.
2	2	"Episode 2"	David Kerr	Tony Roche	28 September 2011	1.56
Josie sees JP putting his weights in the room occupied by unseen housemate Paul, and tells him she regrets that they had sex together. The housemates realise they are in 'social Siberia' so they decide to throw a party, spearheaded by Josie in the hope that she and Kingsley will get together – a plan scuppered when her long-term boyfriend Dave turns up unexpectedly. JP unsuccessfully tries to impress two of his old schoolmates by inviting them to the party, where he gets stoned and then finds Paul throwing his weights out of the window. Vod gets Howard to pose as her boyfriend to get rid of someone she mistakenly kissed in the pub, and Oregon's attempts at cultivating an 'alternative' image are dented when her acquaintances discover that she has a car. Geology lecturer Dan's attempts to fit in at the party culminate in him embarrassing himself by throwing up and falling over.
3	3	"Episode 3"	David Kerr	Penelope Skinner	5 October 2011	1.52
After meeting seductive drama student Ruth, Kingsley switches from geology to her drama course, offending geology lecturer Dan by doing so. Kingsley tries to switch back, but Dan does not let him do so. Josie enrols some of the students in a charity dating scheme but her own date does not turn up, which she later discovers was because he recently died. JP falls asleep during sex with his date and a misunderstanding leads him to worry that he raped her, but he later meets he and discovers he did not. Vod and Howard's charity date at an all-you-can-eat Chinese restaurant ends badly when Howard's attempt to smuggle food out is discovered by the staff. Married lecturer Tony Shales invites Oregon to his house, supposedly to do his cleaning – Vod tells her not to get sexually involved with him, but Oregon embarks on an affair with him. Kingsley's frustration at not being able to get close to Josie inspires his performance piece on his new course.
4	4	"Episode 4"	Nick Wood	Keith Akushie and Penelope Skinner	12 October 2011	1.54
As the housemates are drinking and revealing how they lost their virginity, Kingsley shocks everyone with a far-fetched story about losing his virginity to a 35-year-old woman when he was 12. When Josie talks to him about it later, he admits to her that he made it up and that he is still a virgin. She tells Vod and Oregon, despite promising not to. When Kingsley finds out she told them, Josie offers to have sex with him as a way of making it up to him and that she plans to break up with Dave, much to Kingsley's delight. Oregon and Tony Shales' affair becomes strained when he books them into a hotel but says he will not be able to stay the night, and Vod finds herself actually enjoying writing an essay after Oregon refuses to let her copy her work anymore. On the evening of Kingsley and Josie's planned encounter, he has sex with Ruth, whilst Josie fails to break up with Dave, due to him being at a party to celebrate his grandmother's birthday. Neither of them tells the other, and they have sex together as planned, although he does not ejaculate. JP continues to try to impress his old schoolfriends by buying drugs for them, using Howard as a 'wingman'. They continue to shun him and he returns to the house miserable, only to be amused by the discovery that Kingsley has only just lost his virginity.
5	5	"Episode 5"	Nick Wood	Richard Pinto	19 October 2011	1.56
The housemates are attending an anti-tuition fees protest with JP planning to use the demo as a free trip to meet up with his friends in a bar. At the demo, Kingsley gets kettled with both Ruth and Josie and the truth about him losing his virginity is revealed, leading he and Josie to fall out explosively. Vod is furious when she finds out about Oregon and Tony Shales' affair, and Oregon promises to end it – but she finds herself unable to, and she and Tony Shales sleep together again, although she tells Vod she broke it off. Meanwhile, JP ends up being dragged back to the coach by the police after getting carried away at the demo, and Howard spends the trip bonding with his new friend Brian.
6	6	"Episode 6"	Nick Wood	Rose Heiney and Tony Roche	26 October 2011	1.44
JP is devastated when his emotionally distant father tells him that he recently suffered a heart attack, and Oregon learns that her childhood horse is dying. Vod accidentally overdoses and is taken to hospital where she is told she should enter rehab, but JP talks her into going back to the house instead. JP, Oregon and Vod decide to take acid, but before the girls can take their tabs JP gets a call saying that his father has had another heart attack and that JP needs to return home. As Oregon and Vod are driving JP home whilst he is high on acid, Oregon's mother calls to say her horse is fading fast. They make a detour to her house where Vod is shocked by Oregon's privileged background, and that her name is in fact Melissa. An emotional JP sits with the horse and projects his feelings about his dying father onto it. By the time they reach JP's house his father has died. Meanwhile, Josie accepts a marriage proposal from Dave, and competes with Kingsley to write an article for the student newspaper – Kingsley's article about Vod's overdose is printed whereas Josie's piece is not. However, Kingsley opens the "Rejected" folder while at a party at the student newspaper's headquarters, and discovers that Josie's article is titled "When a friend won't listen to good advice" and, realising it is not just about Vod, he tries to call her, though she doesn't hear her phone. Howard asks Lauren, a girl on his geology course, on a date, but this is sabotaged by his jealous friend Brian, leading Howard to end their friendship.
7	7	"Episode 7"	Annie Griffin	Jon Brown	9 November 2011	1.45
Kingsley is dismayed when Dave moves into the house, and further annoyed when Dave wins the other housemates' admiration by fixing the dishwasher. When he complains about Dave's untidiness Josie accuses him of just being jealous because he blew his chance with her, but when she becomes tired of it herself, she suggests Dave stay in Wales until they get married. JP is in denial about his father's death and goes to see a counsellor just to try to get out of his end-of-term exam, but later decides to take the exam after he bribes Dan to reveal the questions. Vod is in danger of being expelled from her course, and Oregon secretly persuades Tony Shales to increase Vod's grade. Tony Shales' wife Jean Shales, thinks her husband is having an affair with Vod and arranges to meet with her to discuss it. Oregon goes instead and confesses, and is surprised when his wife is happy for the affair to continue. Brian accosts Howard in the pub and makes a move on Josie, and gets headbutted by Dave after revealing that Josie slept with Kingsley. Dave storms back to the house to confront Kingsley, who is hiding in the bathroom with JP, and finds out that Josie slept with both of them. In JP and Howard's geology exam, JP discovers that Dan lied about the questions. Howard and Brian's friendship is resumed after Brian fakes an urgent note to get Howard out of the exam. The next day, Josie tearfully reveals that Dave has broken up with her, and Vod angrily tells Oregon she knows about the grade change, and tells everyone Oregon's real name and background. Oregon is horrified when Tony Shales turns up on the doorstep and tells her that he has left his wife for her.
8	8	"Episode 8"	Annie Griffin	Tom Basden	16 November 2011	1.55
Vod is unconcerned by her impending expulsion from university, despite Oregon's attempts to persuade her to appeal. Josie starts binge-drinking and sleeping with random strangers in an attempt to embrace single life, much to Kingsley's annoyance. Paul Lamb's mother asks Howard to keep an eye on her son, who has apparently had a nervous breakdown. Howard does this by installing cameras around the house and inadvertently records an embarrassing video of Paul, which JP gets hold of. JP finds himself agreeing to pay for Ralph's 'Love Cloud' club night in return for a DJ slot, and when he discovers it clashes with his father's funeral he tries to make arrangements to attend both with the help of a lift from Ralph's friend. Tony Shales expects Oregon to move into his new apartment, but she is unsure and decides to spend time both at the apartment and at the house. During an awkward dinner party at the apartment, attended by the housemates and Tony Shales' middle-aged lecturer friends, Josie and Kingsley's initially subtle sniping at each other erupts into an all-out argument. The housemates come to JP's rescue when Ralph's friend lets him down, and they all accompany him to his father's funeral. Afterwards, Kingsley resolves to confess his true feelings for Josie, after learning she always talks about him when she's drunk. At the Love Cloud night, JP finds his DJ slot has been given to someone else, and that Ralph is claiming to have paid for the night himself. Vod is outraged and tells everyone that it was funded by JP, who then dedicates the night to his father and finally stands up to Ralph. Meanwhile, Vod agrees to appeal her expulsion and Oregon abandons Tony Shales. Ralph's friends have got hold of the video of Paul, and Howard claims it is in fact him in the video to save Paul from the embarrassment. Kingsley is unable to find Josie to tell her how he feels, and gets kicked out of the club after being hit by Ralph. He returns home, to find Josie and JP having sex – which a surprised Josie miserably tells Kingsley was because 'I couldn't find you'. In the final scenes, Oregon and Vod reconcile and prepare for her appeal, JP finally begins to mourn his father, Josie goes to Kingsley's room, presumably to reconcile with him, but is upset to find that a frustrated Kingsley has left early, and Howard is blow-drying a turkey (as per the Peking duck shown in the opening scene in the series) – a thank-you gift from Paul.

=== Series 2 (2012) ===
No. overall	No. in series	Title	Directed by	Written by	Original release date	U.K. viewers (millions)
9	1	"Episode 1"	David Kerr	Jesse Armstrong & Sam Bain	9 October 2012	1.49
It is a new term and the flatmates are back at the house. Josie and Kingsley make peace after their fight the previous term. Vod is skint, and repeatedly asks Oregon to lend her money, while a friend and former classmate of JP's, Giles, has transferred to Manchester Medlock from Exeter, and is staying with him. Howard, meanwhile, has taken a job in an abattoir, and starts bringing back unused pieces of meat, to the disgust of the housemates. Meanwhile, Paul Lamb, the invisible housemate, has flown the nest, forcing the group to start looking for a new tenant. When Kingsley sleeps with Josie's friend Heather, Josie is hurt. Meanwhile, JP is distressed to discover that Giles is openly gay, since he had an encounter with him at Stowe. Giles, however, explains that he is not attracted to JP, and the two reconcile. Tony Shales is bitter at being dumped by Oregon, who is taking an internship with his wife, and unsuccessfully attempts to blackmail her into taking him back. Oregon then discovers that Vod is borrowing money from all of the housemates, and the group confront her. However, she eventually offers items of her own in recompense. JP announces that he wants Giles to become their new housemate, only to discover that they have already rented Paul's room out to Sabine, a Dutch mature student working at the university, and have already given her the key.
10	2	"Episode 2"	David Kerr	Tony Roche	16 October 2012	1.43
The university has been gripped by a spate of muggings, and this leads to Howard becoming increasingly paranoid about setting up defences around the house. JP, who has been confined to his bed by a case of mumps, begins to use his to call Vod, decides to freeze his sperm when he is informed of the possibility of being rendered sterile by the disease. At the same time, Vod and Oregon are both struggling with their finances, and while Oregon's parents simply wire her more money, Vod is forced to take a cleaning job at a local hotel. To add further to the flatmates' woes, Sabine quickly begins to instil a system of order into the house after they eat a cake of hers. Later, Oregon discovers that the money that was wired to her account actually came from Tony Shales, and she promptly returns the money to him. Meanwhile, Kingsley has begun to run into Heather, Josie's friend, across the campus, and becomes convinced that she is stalking him. However, Kingsley then meets Heather in a pub, and, after she provides plausible explanations for the stalking, the two then go for a drink, and end up forming a relationship. Josie, upset at Kingsley's relationship, accidentally breaks Heather's arm while Sabine is showing everyone (minus Kingsley and JP) self-defence techniques.
11	3	"Episode 3"	David Kerr	Tom Basden	23 October 2012	1.24
There is a potentially lucrative internship on offer from BP, which Howard and JP immediately compete for, but when JP is caught stealing, the representative takes an interest in Kingsley, inviting him to an upcoming BP event. Kingsley is excited, but his relationship with Heather is damaged by her opposition to it. Howard and JP are jealous of Kingsley, and resolve to get into the event themselves. Josie, still upset over Kingsley's relationship with Heather, moves rooms with Sabine, and gets a job at Vod's hotel, only to get fired. Later, Kingsley decides not to attend the event, after discovering that the image of him on one of their posters has had his soul patch airbrushed out. He gives his ticket to Howard. Howard, Vod and JP all attend the event, and after Vod impresses the representative, they all look set to get internships. However, Vod stages an anti-BP protest, by standing on a table and spilling oil everywhere. The three of them are ejected. At the house, Josie and Kingsley have their first civilised conversation in a long time, and Josie makes a subtle but impassioned attempt to convey her feelings to him. Before he can respond, Heather turns up and the two reconcile, leaving Josie hurt. Meanwhile, Oregon's new magazine comes under threat when Jean Shales hires an arrogant new intern to join her team, and she gives him the funding for the magazine Oregon was organising. Desperate, Oregon asks Tony Shales for help, and he eventually finds some funding from the Jewish Society, while finding the university statute necessary to have Oregon's rival magazine closed down. When Oregon thanks Tony, he attempts to persuade her to have sex with him, but she turns him down, leading to an angry outburst from him.
12	4	"Episode 4"	David Kerr	Richard Pinto & Penelope Skinner	30 October 2012	1.24
JP has invited the gang to stay at his mother's country house in Cornwall for the Spring holidays. Kingsley initially decides to stay in Manchester with Heather, but she persuades him to join them, and Howard stays behind in order to call his computer company's customer services. After Howard spends the whole weekend on the phone, Sabine gets bored and persuades him to have sex with her. In Cornwall, JP's mother reveals she is selling the house. Enraged, JP resolves to barricade the gang inside the house to prevent potential buyers from viewing it, while drinking all 147 bottles of his father's wine. Oregon finds herself receiving abuse on Twitter for Tony Shales having an LGBT magazine closed down, and tries to persuade Vod to engage in lesbian experimentation with her in an effort to dispel the rumours that she is homophobic, but Vod turns her down, saying Oregon is "too straight," so she instead takes a photograph of herself kissing Josie. Kingsley becomes concerned when Heather mentions a man named Mike in one of her texts, while Vod discovers some letters of JP's father's to an illicit lover, revealing that he was not what JP thought he was. Josie, meanwhile, is bitter because her ex-fiance, Dave, is getting married, and she drunkenly tries to steal Oregon's car to gatecrash the wedding. When Kingsley tries to stop her, she confronts him for his role in Dave breaking up with her, and orders him to drive her up to Wales himself. There, she changes her mind about Dave, and reassures Kingsley that Heather likes him. However, she overhears him telling Heather that he loves her over the phone, and her eyes fill with tears. Back in Cornwall, JP is burning the last of his possessions, tearfully resolving to give up on the house and return to Manchester with his father's ashes. Vod and Oregon console him, and Vod discreetly throws JP's father's letters onto the fire so that he will not find out about them.
13	5	"Episode 5"	Annie Griffin	Penelope Skinner	6 November 2012	1.26
After Josie accidentally leaves her front door key in the door before going for a night out with Heather, the house is broken into. Among the things that are stolen are Oregon's camera and the urn containing JP's father's ashes. To ensure that the insurance covers it, Josie smashes a window to make it look like a forced entry. Vod falls madly in love with Al, the man who is repairing the lock, but Howard convinces Oregon that he is a potential perpetrator. JP sees an opportunity to make a new friend with him, and Vod eventually has sex with him. Oregon, meanwhile, meets an attractive librarian named Dylan, and falls for him. Josie's problems get worse when she turns up to her dentistry practical drunk, and makes a horrific mistake, for which she is summoned before a disciplinary hearing and kicked off her course. Kingsley is suspicious, and eventually forces Heather to confess that the break-in was caused by Josie. Howard embarks on an investigation into the break-in, and accuses Sabine – whom he resents because of the previous episode – of having left the door unlocked. Kingsley takes Josie outside and tells her that if she does not confess, he will do it for her. Before she can protest, he tells her that he knows what she did, and that he thought she was better than that. Josie, seeing all the hurt her actions have caused, breaks down and cries into his shoulder. She eventually searches in a nearby skip, and finds the urn containing JP's father's ashes. Unfortunately, she accidentally spills them.
14	6	"Episode 6"	Annie Griffin	Annie Griffin and Tony Roche	13 November 2012	1.28
Kingsley is dissatisfied with the quality of Dan's teaching, and makes an official complaint. However, JP and Howard do not back him up – JP because he had changed his mind, and Howard because Dan had got him a summer internship with Shell. Things come to a head on a field trip in the Pennines when JP gets trapped on a ledge, and admits to Kingsley that Heather had walked in on him in the shower, which is why he's been acting awkward around her. As a result, Kingsley refuses to help him down, and the two get into an argument. Howard, meanwhile, abandons them when Sabine texts him saying she wants to have sex, only to come home and find the offer is no longer standing, to his fury. Dan is infuriated to learn that he has had a complaint lodged against him, and even angrier when he learns that it was Kingsley, and deliberately drives off without him, though not before forcing him to chase the van on a broken leg (which JP had fallen on in an effort to escape the ledge). Oregon, meanwhile, is happily in a relationship with Dylan, and Vod, initially suspicious of him, proclaims him to be "Mr. Perfect." However, when his father calls, she discovers that he is Tony Shales's son, and throws his phone into a lake whilst panicking. Vod, meanwhile, is relieved that her RAF bursary has finally come through, but learns that she must now pass a drug test to qualify for it. She borrows some "clean" urine from Josie, but it doesn't pass because Josie is on Beta blockers. Josie, meanwhile, has been kicked off her course for her irresponsibility in the previous episode, though she is hiding this from the housemates. When an attempt to petition herself an appeal fails, she asks Heather to do the same thing she did on a willing subject, to 'normalise' the mistake in the eyes of the other students. Heather is hesitant to take the risk, and after seeing Josie and Kingsley being affectionate towards each other, becomes suspicious that she still harbours feelings for him. When the time comes to do the deed, Heather refuses, and the pair end up arguing over Kingsley, before uneasily reconciling.
15	7	"Episode 7"	Annie Griffin	Jon Brown	20 November 2012	1.36
Heather unexpectedly signs Kingsley up for an open mic event at the Student Union, but after his performance does not go well he recruits Oregon as a bandmate. Sabine has become fed up with the housemates and returns to Rotterdam, leaving a heartbroken Howard taking his frustration out on the housemates by cutting off their electricity, so Kingsley can't have band practices in the house. JP, following one dig too many at his privileged background, accepts Ralph's offer to join "The Stoweaways" – a dining club of Old Stoics at the University. JP becomes infatuated with Celeste (Clare Fettarappa), the French cousin of one of the Stoweaways, but Ralph 'claims' her by calling shotgun and asks JP to keep an eye on her for him while is away. JP tries to resist but eventually kisses her. Ralph finds out and kicks him out of the group, and Celeste angrily accuses JP of treating her like a piece of meat. Vod and Kingsley spot Josie wandering around the city when she should be in lectures, and Heather eventually reveals that Josie was kicked off her course. Vod bonds with legendary American poet John Frobisher after she gatecrashes the drinks reception of his lecture, but is horrified when he dies the next day because of the amount he drank with her. She is shocked when Tony Shales hints that he contributed to Frobisher's death just so he could raise his own profile by writing the poet's obituary. Oregon has not yet told Dylan about her relationship with his father, and Tony Shales unsuccessfully continues to try and win her back. Kingsley is annoyed to find that Oregon is a better musician than him and so he quits his own band at their gig. Outside he finds Josie, who has been refused entry as she is no longer a student. He comforts her after she confesses she is scared about her future, and the pair almost kiss, but do not do so.
16	8	"Episode 8"	Annie Griffin	Tony Roche	27 November 2012	1.27
As the end of the academic year approaches, JP purchases the house, regarding it as his only home now that his old home has been sold and his father is dead, but is distressed to learn that Oregon and Dylan are planning a backpacking trip around the South Americas, Kingsley and Heather are moving into a small bedsit, and Vod is reluctant to stay in a house with him. Howard, meanwhile, has learnt that Sabine is pregnant with his baby, and adopts a baby pig. However, Oregon is frightened when Jean threatens to tell Dylan about her relationship with Tony Shales at her book launch, and Vod lies to Tony Shales about the actual meaning of the late John Frobisher's "Red Lady," forcing him to rewrite his book. Despite JP's best efforts to unite them, everyone seems to be splitting up. At the book launch, though, Dylan learns about Oregon's affair with his father, following which Vod reveals the actual meaning of John Frobisher's "Red Lady," effectively leaving his academic career in tatters. Dylan initially decides to stay with Oregon, but after kissing her, decides that it is too weird, and breaks up with her. After learning that Sabine was not pregnant, Howard pours his heart out to her, but is rejected. Devastated, he decides to leave the University, but JP convinces him to stay. Kingsley, meanwhile, is horrified to learn that Josie, despite her earlier statement that she is staying in Manchester, is transferring to Southampton to study Zoology. While having a conversation later on, the two finally share a kiss, and have sex in an upstairs bathroom. That night, the housemates party in their house, with Oregon sobbing on the couch. Kingsley, however, is nervous about breaking up with Heather if Josie does not want a relationship with him, and is transferring to Southampton. Josie tells him that it is up to him, and leaves just as Heather turns up, and Kingsley is left in a dilemma. The next morning, as Howard and JP relax in their new hot tub and Oregon and Vod head off travelling, Josie boards her coach to return to Cardiff, but just as it pulls away, Kingsley rushes through the crowd just in time to see it leave, revealing that he has made his decision.

=== Series 3 (2013) ===
A third series was commissioned in November 2012 and premiered on 28 October 2013 via 4oD, before transmission on Channel 4 the following week, on 4 November.

No. overall	No. in series	Title	Directed by	Written by	Original release date	U.K. viewers (millions)
17	1	"Episode 1"	Gordon Anderson	Jesse Armstrong and Sam Bain	4 November 2013	1.47
As the friends begin their second year at Manchester Medlock, they welcome new fresher Candice into the house. Vod and Oregon return from their trip to South America separately with a hint of tension between them, and Oregon finds herself taking care of the naive Candice. Josie, meanwhile, is lonely in Southampton, and attempts to compensate for it by spending hours on Skype. Kingsley denies having a relationship with either her or Heather, while Howard and JP try to coax female freshers to join their skiing society. Vod's summer fling, Javier, unexpectedly arrives and it becomes clear that Vod had forced Oregon to translate for her whenever she and Javier were together. JP and Howard's skiing society is exposed as an attempt to pull girls, who desert the group en masse at their house party, though not before Howard successfully scores, to JP's shock. With nothing else to do, the gang decide to go to Southampton to attend a "traffic light" party that Josie has invited them to. JP attempts to flaunt his social status to win girls over, but these fail, while Kingsley suggests to Josie that they remain friends and Candice ends up taking drugs and drinking, which end in her being sick. That night, as the gang are sleeping in Josie's room, JP is awakened by a sound coming from the bed, and he, Vod and Howard realise that Kingsley and Josie are very discreetly having sex, and upon waking up Oregon (who is sleeping next to them) and warning her, she creates a scene, resulting in JP suggesting that they engage in an orgy, humiliating himself. The next day, Josie and Kingsley decide to start dating, to the delight of the group, but on the bus ride home, Javier decides to rip up his ticket and stay in Britain illegally, to the dismay of Oregon and Vod. Back in Manchester, Kingsley decides to break up with Heather properly, rather than by text, while Howard goes on his date. Both end up unsuccessful – Howard loses his nerve outside the pub, and Kingsley soon discovers that Heather still believes they are together, and she reveals that her grandfather is dying, putting him in a dilemma.
18	2	"Episode 2"	Gordon Anderson	D. C. Jackson and Tony Roche	11 November 2013	1.40
Vod is getting fed up of Javier, but the language barrier and his obvious love for her is preventing her from breaking up with him, and her efforts to find him a job so that he can earn money to return to Mexico all fail. She eventually decides to marry him, so that he can find work legally and she can eventually break up with him. Oregon is shocked by Vod's selfishness, but is unable to persuade her of the potentially heartache she would cause him, and eventually storms off when Vod makes a tactless comment questioning why they're still friends. She attempts to fill the gap by helping Candice with her crush, a boy in her Christian Union group. Kingsley, meanwhile, is finding it difficult to juggle his relationships with Heather and Josie, since he has to pay rent to both his shared flat with her and his room at JP's house, and has to alternate between the two places when Josie makes the long-distance trip from Southampton to Manchester to visit. It also forces him to struggle through many awkward phone conversations between them. Upon her arrival in Manchester, Josie admits that she is hating her Zoology course and Southampton, and that she would like to move back up to Manchester. Since the only course available to her is Pharmacology, she immediately applies, but is shocked when the course tutor turns out to be Sabine, who makes it clear that she will not support Josie's application, because of her behaviour. JP and Howard, meanwhile, compete over Sam, the girl that Howard managed to pull in the previous episode. It soon becomes clear that Sam is more interested in JP, but Howard refuses to give up. At Vod's wedding party at the pub, Oregon eventually realises that Vod means too much to her for her to end their friendship, and comes for the party. Josie invites Sabine, and manages to convince her to support her application. To Howard's devastation, Sam decides to ask JP on a date, but remain friends with him. Heather turns up at the pub, and explains to Kingsley that her grandfather has just died, and she is returning to Hong Kong. She adds that she cannot be in a relationship any more, and formally breaks up with him. Kingsley cannot hide his glee as she leaves.
19	3	"Episode 3"	Gordon Anderson	Tom Basden, Henrietta Ashworth and Jessica Ashworth	18 November 2013	1.07
After Vod's attempt to get rid of Javier by abandoning him in Rochdale fails, Javier becomes fed up with the way she treats him and starts acting cold towards her. Feeling guilty, she attempts to make amends by cooking dinner for him, and admits that she does not want to live with him anymore. He reveals that he is moving in with a workmate, and leaves the house the next day. Howard devises a plan to defeat JP as a rival for Sam's affections, by organising a team for her charity pub quiz, with JP as captain. JP is initially excited by the prospect of impressing Sam, until he learns that there will be a "captain's only" round at the end, and realises that Howard's plan is to embarrass him. Oregon, meanwhile, becomes jealous when she interprets Tony Shales' marking of Candice's essay as sexual advances on her and ends up engaging in a game of one-upmanship with her at the quiz. At the end of the quiz, JP is busted cheating and ends up alienating Sam, while Oregon realises that Shales is not interested in Candice, and Candice learns of Oregon's affair with Shales. Meanwhile, Kingsley and Josie, wanting to make up lost time, go on a camping trip to Buxton over the weekend. There, it becomes clear that Josie is expecting a weekend of alcohol and sex, and Kingsley is hoping to bond with her. In his frustration, Kingsley tells her that he loves her. Shaken, Josie becomes paranoid that Kingsley is trying to force her into a long-term commitment, misinterpreting many of his comments or actions as signs of this. Eventually, she apologises, and admits that she loves him as well, and the two kiss on the bus home.
20	4	"Episode 4"	Gordon Anderson	Tom Basden	25 November 2013	1.04
JP convinces Kingsley, Josie and Vod to join him in taking part in a paid medical drug trial, fully knowing that Sam will be there. Vod promptly leaves after discovering the trial has a strict "no narcotics" policy. At the clinic, JP tries to impress Sam with stories from his gap year, and initially appears successful, until he tells one in which a friend of his almost died after being left in the sea off the coast of Durban, thinking it was funny. Meanwhile Kingsley starts to feel worried about Heather's impending return from Hong Kong, knowing that Josie will want a proper catch-up with her and believes he might have developed testicular cancer due to his guilt. He resolves to tell Josie about his affair with Heather, but cannot bring himself to do it. When his paranoia gets worse, Josie accidentally ruins the trial by revealing who is on the drug and who is on the placebo. Vod returns to the house to find that Oregon has written a play with characters who are exaggerated fictionalised versions of the housemates. When it is clear Oregon is using this to make herself seem the hero and people have their doubts, Vod agrees to help Oregon and participates in the play. Elsewhere, Howard's ambition of renting a new book in the library are dashed when he meets a new tough student in the library, and prepares himself for a fight. Kingsley and Josie attend Oregon's play; afterwards Josie admits she had a drunken fling with a boy in Southampton, and Kingsley, sensing an opportunity, admits to his affair with Heather. Although Josie is upset, she hesitantly accepts what he did, and they agree to move on from it. JP tries to reconcile with Sam after discovering he had no part in the near death of his friend, but discovers she is now with another boy.
21	5	"Episode 5"	Jamie Jay Johnson	Penelope Skinner	2 December 2013	1.12
Vod announces that her mother, Chris (Juliet Cowan), is coming to stay, although nobody can believe she has got one at all. When Chris arrives, she turns out to be sexually promiscuous and an alcoholic who has often neglected Vod. Her alcoholism causes severe mood swings, as she demonstrates when she throws a tantrum because she forgot to buy a duck she wanted to cook, wrecking the house. Vod eventually stands up to her and tells her that she is the result of many of her insecurities, before sending her off the next morning. Meanwhile, Josie and Kingsley decide to get over the incidents of the previous episode with a "relationship amnesty", in order to wipe the slate clean. Although things go smoothly initially, Kingsley is shaken to learn that Josie fakes most of her orgasms during sex with him, but did not do on the occasions where she had sex with JP. He attempts to remedy the problem by finding a way to make her have one, but Josie admits that the problem is with her, rather than him. They are both shocked after Chris tells them in a drunken rant that their relationship is doomed. JP is still nursing a broken heart over Sam's rejection, and has lost his usual confidence and cockiness, becoming placid, quiet, and completely uninterested in Chris's attempts to have sex with him. Howard becomes obsessed with a book about feminism that Candice gives to him and finds himself in a dilemma, wondering if he should continue to sexually objectify women or be a feminist. When he tells Candice of his problems, she becomes exasperated, and accidentally suggests that he have sex with her, quickly claiming it to be a joke when she realises what she has just said. At the same time, Oregon's play has been poorly received by the local media, but she soon discovers that there was one good review, written by a reviewer with a female name. Oregon tries to find out who wrote it, but is disappointed when she realises it was Tony Shales, using one of his female pseudonyms.
22	6	"Episode 6"	Jamie Jay Johnson	Jon Brown	9 December 2013	1.03
Oregon decides she wants to campaign against the deportation of a Tunisian student and enlists in the help of JP, Kingsley, Josie and Candice in organising a sit-in at the university. Though she didn't come up with the campaign, Oregon quickly does anything she can to take control of the situation. She asks Kingsley to write a protest song for the sit-in and goes about making her own rules. However, she finds herself deeply attracted to the Tunisian student and ends up having sex with him, though things turn disastrous when she causes him a horrific injury. After being told by Vod his new mopey attitude is making him lose his reputation as a "legend", JP quickly goes about coming up with several crazy and ill-advised schemes to try to make himself a legend again, including buying an air-hockey table for the house, spontaneously buying a £9,000 house and setting his shoes on fire. He does all of this at the sit-in but is largely ignored by his peers. Josie's attempts to join the sit-in are thwarted when Sabine shows up asking her to help proofread her thesis (Josie cannot refuse as Sabine is her course Ph.D. overlooker and marker of work). During the night, Sabine gets increasingly drunk and relays problems about an old boyfriend of hers to Josie, who desperately tries to contact Kingsley to try to get her out of the house. Sabine starts licking Oregon's biscuits and putting them back in the packet, as she says she was aware of the others making fun of her whilst she lived with them. Just when it seems Josie can't take anymore, she sees a text from Sabine's ex telling her he wants to be left alone and decides to comfort Sabine. Kingsley manages to write a song for the sit-in which does not really impress Oregon and Candice; it does, however, attract the attention of Sam, and the two bond over their interest in similar styles and genres of music. When Sam offers Kingsley a spare ticket to a gig, he sees that Josie has been trying to contact him several times that night, but accepts Sam's invitation anyway. Howard does his best to avoid Candice as he thinks she may have feelings for him. He tells Josie that he feels he is not "right" for relationships and will try his best to avoid Candice. Josie says the only way he can know for sure is to ask. Howard goes to the sit-in to talk to Candice but discovers she only wants to be friends with him. Vod decides to seek counselling to talk about the problems she has had with her mother. She is prevented from leaving the therapist's office due to the sit-in, and the two bond over a joint and a mutual troubled relationship with their mothers. Vod eventually allows herself to let go by going on a road trip with the therapist and throwing a grenade, the last memento of her childhood, into a lake.
23	7	"Episode 7"	Jamie Jay Johnson	Tony Roche	16 December 2013	1.15
It is Howard's birthday, but he has made as much effort as possible to hide it from the housemates, because of a bad experience that he had previously. Candice soon finds out about it, and, despite promising not to tell anyone, decides to arrange a party for him. At the same time, Oregon decides to run for Student Union President after the incumbent resigns due to the events of the previous episode, and Vod offers to tag along and help. Josie, fed up of JP's neglect of the house, soon finds herself bonding with the boys who live in the flat next door. And JP makes numerous attempts to kill Kingsley, due to his friendship with Sam, under the impression that there is something going on between them. Although the party that Candice is organising clashes with Oregon's campaign party and a LAN party that Howard has organised to rival Candice's, the three soon merge into one, as Howard soon finds himself enjoying Candice's party more than his own. However, Candice foolishly decides to invite Sabine and Heather, while JP has forced Kingsley to invite Sam under threat of revealing his many text messages to Josie, and Josie's friends from next door arrive unexpectedly, hoping to crash the event. The result is an explosive argument between Heather and Josie, with Kingsley caught in the middle, unable to defend himself as usual. Heather is shocked when Josie reveals that Kingsley had been seeing them both concurrently at the beginning of term, and Sam soon finds herself dragged into it when Josie demands to know why Kingsley never mentioned his friendship with her, accusing him of cheating on her again. Josie's new friends are soon brought in when Kingsley brings up that Josie has been hanging with them and never mentioned it either. Ultimately, Heather and Josie end their friendship, as do Kingsley and Sam, and Josie orders both out. After berating Kingsley further, she leaves to spend the night next door. While all this is happening, the resigning SU President overhears Vod describing her role in Oregon's campaign as being like a puppeteer controlling a puppet, and mentions it to Oregon. Oregon is outraged, and confronts Vod, and they have an explosive row of their own, deciding to run against each other in the SU Presidential race. Howard, meanwhile, is encouraged by Sabine to give in to his feelings for Candice, but soon discovers that she is hooked up, to his fury. With the party now completely ruined, and the entire gang's friendship in tatters, JP and Kingsley are left alone in the living room. JP once again gets jealous and attacks him. Kingsley and JP's fight soon enters the kitchen, where JP throws a bread knife and then a plate at Kingsley, who tries to reason with him, all the while insisting that there was never anything happening between him and Sam. JP eventually loses it and proceeds to destroy the kitchen with a rolling pin, while a frustrated Kingsley goes to bed. Now alone in the kitchen, a crying JP collapses onto the floor, tearfully lamenting that second year was meant to be 'spear year'.
24	8	"Episode 8"	Jamie Jay Johnson	Tony Roche	23 December 2013	1.01
After the events of the previous episode, Vod and Oregon are squaring off in the Student Union Presidential Election, while Howard is pining over Candice, Kingsley and Josie are attempting to patch things up, and JP has decided to put the house on the market and leave Manchester. To Oregon's shock, Vod's sensationalist, delusional policies are winning more support than her more sensible, in-depth policies, and realises she will need to step up her game, so at the first debate, she successfully manages to discredit Vod's entire manifesto of "cheap chips," by pointing out the financial difficulties that this will entail. After the debate, the two get into another argument, and when Vod finally asks Oregon what the problem is, she reveals that she is afraid that Vod will just abandon her responsibilities as she abandoned her in South America during the Summer Holidays, and Vod realises that Oregon is right. Howard makes a breakthrough with Candice after learning she is not in a relationship after all; and, after a very awkward date, they proceed to have sex back at the house. At the same time, JP decides not to put the house up for sale after reminiscing his time there while on a viewing. He decides to instead clean the house up himself, and do some cocaine. Doing so motivates him to tell Sam that he is finally over her. And, at the Student Union election, Vod decides to help Oregon win, and proceeds to announce her plans for some increasingly ludicrous policies, but cannot lose her support. At Oregon's advice, she goes on a homophobic rant, turning her into a pariah figure, and winning Oregon the election. Meanwhile, Josie and Kingsley attempt to salvage their relationship by engaging in an open relationship, since infidelity has been a major problem throughout. However, when they get an opportunity to follow through — Josie with Noah, a boy from next door, and then with JP, and Kingsley with Sam at the Nick Cave concert — neither are able to bring themselves to follow through with it, and they return to each other. Despite this, Josie begins to feel down and depressed, while Kingsley makes numerous suggestions for how to make their relationship work. Following Oregon's victory, however, it emerges that the Student Union is in financial difficulty, and facing legal action from the National Union of Students – the resigning President had merely tricked Oregon into becoming President as revenge for hijacking her Tunisia campaign. However, Vod promptly steps in and provides Oregon with some support. At the same time, as JP tidies the house while high, Josie finally admits to Kingsley that their relationship is not working, and in fact could end up destroying their friendship entirely. Despite Kingsley's protests, she sadly suggests that they take a break from each other. Kingsley simply responds with a resigned "Yeah, okay". That night, Oregon and Vod fall asleep in each other's arms after successfully drafting a press release warning the other students of tough times ahead, while Howard and Candice snuggle up in bed together. Kingsley and Josie go to bed in their regular bedrooms, tenderly touching each other's fingers through the old glory hole in their wall. And JP finishes tidying up the house, before commenting on how desperate for sex he is.

=== Series 4 (2016) ===
No. overall	No. in series	Title	Directed by	Written by	Original release date	U.K. viewers (millions)
25	1	"Episode 1"	Jamie Jay Johnson	Jesse Armstrong & Sam Bain	22 February 2016	1.3
The episode opens in the opening days of the final term of third year, with the housemates pondering over the apparent disappearance of Howard, who quickly appears and reveals he has been revising at bizarre hours in the cellar, later labeling himself "the Fritzl of revision." JP's older brother Tomothy unexpectedly turns up, fully aware of his younger brother's lazy habits such as missing lectures and not keeping track of the other housemates' rent payments. Shocked by JP's thinly thought out and absurd career plans, Tomothy aims to change JP's ways, eager for him to take up a role at his firm in London, reminding the housemates of how close they are to the end of university. Oregon is consumed in her role as President of the Student Union, having just penned a book for final years as a much-needed motivator to help them cope in their final months of education. Eagerly awaiting for Candice to return from her Erasmus term in France, a series of her texts have kept Howard at bay. A sympathetic Josie makes sharp some of Candice's sugar-coated messages for Howard, eventually helping him to come to terms with the fact that his relationship has ended, much to his confusion and upset. Before he plans on knuckling down, JP plans one last blow out, uneasy at the portrayal of life in the real world his brother gives. That night in the student bar Oregon connects with Tomothy, who happily gives a more mature view on her position. Armed with this and partly out of spite for her handbook not having been fully published, she confronts her aide Rosa, who Kingsley has found solace in love-wise, and fires her. Concerned with the prospect of Tomothy adulterating with Oregon, JP confronts Oregon and takes out his anger at the situation on her. She ignores his pleas and returns Tomothy's interest. Seriously struggling under heavy financial pressure, Vod uses her streetwise streak to pursue drug dealing, initially turning to Josie for help but only to be rebuffed. She works with Sabine, who creates a batch of pills she can sell, initially giving her one trial pill which she struggles to flog, but then finds luck with Tomothy. Sabine finds her in the bar, expressing concerns over the quantities used when making the pill, causing Vod to worry. Back at the house JP and Vod keep an extremely close eye on Tomothy. Tomothy snaps at JP's calls not to be unfaithful to his wife and carries on regardless. Bursting in on Oregon and Tomothy, an altercation between the pair, JP and Vod ensues where it is revealed the pill Vod sold Tomothy may not be safe. Sabine soon arrives at the house and antidotes the atmosphere of panic by revealing that it is fine after all, giving Vod the remainder of the batch she promised her, only for Vod to throw them away, shaken by the experience. The next morning, it is seen that Oregon has slept with Tomothy, Kingsley has slept with Rosa and Josie has slept with JP, much to her evident regret.
26	2	"Episode 2"	Jamie Jay Johnson	Tom Basden	29 February 2016	TBA
A meeting with a university career advisor brings to light how tough it will be for some of the gang to secure a good job in the real world after they finish third year. Josie wakes that same morning to discover she has slept with JP once more, again regretting it. Concerned about who she will be living with next year, she constructs a board of her ideal housemates. Carrying out a series of viewings for the next year, Josie is left seriously unimpressed with the likely prospects, particularly considering their tea-making abilities. A strengthening friendship between her and Howard help him to focus on pursuing a job with Ordnance Survey in the wake of his break up with Candice. Unable to make plans with Kingsley in their newly blossoming relationship, Rosa reveals her eighteen-year-old son Luca is coming to stay with her but she is unhappy at his decision not to go to university after he leaves school. Ever eager to impress his girlfriend, Kingsley suggests Luca come to the house and talk with the gang in an attempt to change his mind. Despite the odd positive the housemates throw Luca's way, he refuses to budge, putting into perspective the decreasing value of a degree in the hardship of life on the other side of university. Irritated at this truth and wishing to get back at him, Kingsley reveals to Luca that he is in a relationship with his mother, causing him to lash out. Reeling in the glee of Rosa's dismissal and transfer to another university position, Oregon makes the most of her now unrestricted power by overlooking funding to societies. Unimpressed with the current situation, Oregon decides to cut funding to the rugby societies and instead use the money to set up her own poetry prize, with the promise of £20,000 for the winner. A few members of the affected societies then egg her at an empty publicity launch for this prize in retaliation. Meanwhile, Vod has found a short-term solution to her ever escalating money troubles by getting a job in a local pub. However, the housemates' constant expectation of free drinks and taunts at Vod's maturing persona soon begin to wind her up. When confronted by the pub landlord about having been giving away free drinks and faced with the problem of having to cover those costs, Vod caves to her usual hedonistic ways and steals a barrel of beer for the house to enjoy, who do so by making a video to send to Luca portraying this as one activity they indulge in at university. The episode closes with Josie initiating sex with JP, who has skirted around career ideas alternative to those his brother has in mind for him.
27	3	"Episode 3"	Jamie Jay Johnson	Penelope Skinner	7 March 2016	0.84
English dissertations are due in with a fast approaching deadline but Vod doubts her capabilities, instead choosing not to submit hers when planned. Seeking an outsider's perspective she heads to see an old friend who heads an anarchist commune in West Wittering, secretly considering this an alternative way of life, particularly under her ever-mounting financial stress. Pursuing her poetry prize, Oregon finds the disabled rugby team occupying her office, protesting against her decision to slash their funding. It is made clear that she slashed the funding without having realised what this society was. Seeking to periodically flee the situation when the team discover her address, she decides to go with Vod. Feeling as though she is unable to talk about her feelings with other members of the house, Josie also decides to tag along, undergoing an identity crisis – renaming herself 'Jobbo' with an image and attitude later revealed to have been an attempted copy of Vod's. The boys of the house head down to London. Kingsley is pursuing a job at BBC Radio 6 Music, Howard his at Ordnance Survey and JP has an interview for the job his brother wishes him to fill. When they arrive, Howard fails to get on a train in time, separating himself from his belongings, JP and Kingsley. Quickly acquiring an understanding of and warming to the commune's way of life, Vod discusses her insecurities concerning university, her dissertation and money troubles with friend Paz. Sharing their anti-establishment ideas, Vod begins to make up her mind. Bent on projecting himself ostentatiously and having ignored others' advice, Kingsley fails to make it past the first stage of the job interview, unlike all of the other candidates. Reacting badly and refusing feedback on his application, after calming down, Kingsley later changes his mind and decides to go back for it. After a disastrous interview, a frightened JP hides from a furious Tomothy. Alone with merely a compass, Howard navigates his way around London, getting in touch with a member of Ordnance Survey for help, with whom he later finds to bear some striking similarities to. Before all taking a hallucinogenic drug, in order to cleanse their surroundings, the girls decide to reveal their truths. Desperately trying to reorganise funding to societies, Oregon reveals that she failed to investigate properly before making mistakes – juggling this with an application for a prestigious scholarship in the US and her university work, much to Josie and Vod's annoyance. Josie tells the other two about her sexual relationship with JP but blames them for it happening, admitting that she is hurt with the attention they failed to give her in their friendship, too busy with other things. Combined with this and Josie's disapproval at Vod's decision to join the commune before finishing university, the two fight. Vod later reveals that, although not having stayed on track throughout university, she now aims for a first and cares about her performance, having worked hard to get into Manchester Medlock. Some comforting words from Oregon make her decide to head back and hand in her dissertation. Josie decides to bin the 'Jobbo' personality, to Vod and Oregon's assent. Reunited with Howard at London Victoria, the boys get the bus back to Manchester, considering if life outside of university fares too much for them. Having made amends, heading home, the girls improperly and humorously trawl through submissions to Oregon's poetry prize.
28	4	"Episode 4"	Jamie Jay Johnson	Jon Brown	14 March 2016	0.9
Still seething with anger at JP deliberately ruining his interview and irritated at his spending habits, Tomothy switches off JP's money tap on the proviso he also alternatively take a more junior role at Frome & Harrington as he is unable to take up the position Tomothy wished for him to fill. JP becomes further disheartened at living on severely less money when the university reject him an emergency hardship loan and the student newspaper pay him a mere £5 for illustrations to one edition. Drowning in a huge flood of entries to her poetry prize, Oregon chooses to ignore almost all and instead burn them, refusing to accept that her fallacy of slashing funding to sports societies and using the money to fund the competition would be a prosperous move. Having promised to pay his expenses for helping her sift through entries, Oregon's situation worsens when she discovers Professor Shales has run up a grossly high bill. Continuing the hunt for new friends, Josie fares to much initial popularity in the Badminton Society but is suddenly met with a problematic ultimatum: sign a petition to have Oregon kicked out of office or face being shunned from the society. When Oregon closes the nightline service, this adds fuel to many of the student's literal fire, when they burn an effigy of her. Oregon is shocked to discover Josie encouraging hatred against her at the event and that she signed the petition under a false name. Irrationally enraged by the university's plans for hosting a graduation ball, Kingsley warms to Vod's suggestion of hosting an alternative ball. Picking up the idea and getting further insights of how to run such an event from Vod, the two team up to run it when Vod discovers how much money they will make; now trying to tackle a seeming abyss of debt. They put their plan into action and shop round for locations and security whilst Kingsley ponders over his discovery that Rosa originates from Switzerland, not Italy as he previously believed. Anxious to enrich his CV, Howard adduces some fictitious details to spice it up. After sending it off to Ordnance Survey, he worriedly tries to pursue the interests he stated he enjoyed but later is angered when he can't perform them. He later comes clean to Ordnance Survey, who appreciate the honesty and inform him that should he be awarded a first class degree, the job he has applied for will be his for the taking. At an official vote concerning the continuation of Oregon's presidency, the five housemates are the sole people to support her. A vote from everybody else against her at the event hold no confidence, and a poor new haircut paired with a mismatched musical number prove to be the final nail in the coffin of her reign.
29	5	"Episode 5"	Jamie Jay Johnson	Jon Brown	21 March 2016	TBA
It's the day before finals begin and Josie is busy playing mother to the housemates and jokingly taunting them about their exams. Meanwhile, plans for 'Vodstock' (the alternative graduation ball) are escalating, with the promise of extreme attractions bringing Vod and Kingsley many customers. Things take a bad turn for Kingsley however when Rosa ends their relationship. Procrastinating from revision, JP hires a narrowboat for revision purposes, inviting Howard on board who initially refuses. However, soon wound up by the noise of something unidentifiable, Howard escapes it by joining him. Howard then snaps at JP's behaviour on the boat and finds out it was him making noise around the house with a drill, all stemming down to his desire for help with revision. The drug dealers that Vod hired as security for the ball later break into the house in search of the ticket money Vod revealed she had hidden, refusing to leave until they have found the money or are given it; the housemates locking themselves in the cellar to hide. A night of revelations ensue. Vod comes clean and tells the housemates who the robbers are and why they've broken into the house, much to their shock and disappointment. Howard states that he is going to drop out of geology and re-start the next year on a new course – this revelation coming from his fear of the next day's exams and his imminent move to London, pending results. Josie states that she wouldn't mind anyone staying another three years at Medlock, not wishing to be alone next year but JP jumps in to Josie's defence against Kingsley when he snaps at her, only for the revelation of JP and Josie's sexual relationship to come to his attention, much to his disbelief, horror and blatant upset, especially considering he was the only housemate not to know. Now suffering from migraines induced by stress, Kingsley plays to Josie's annoyance. Provoked by Josie's minor delusions that she is a 'mother hen' to the house, Oregon turns on her, annoyed that Josie feels the need to involve herself in their business instead of worrying about her own life. Josie retaliates by revealing that Oregon was rejected from being awarded a Fulbright scholarship to study in the US, having previously opened the informing letter. Hurt at Josie's actions and this news, Oregon breaks down and the group then comfort her. They call on Vod to hand over the money and forget the alternative graduation ball so as to end their self-entrapment in the cellar. Despite fierce reluctance, Vod eventually hands over the money. Coming up from the cellar, the housemates find the house completely wrecked, with many of their possessions destroyed or damaged. JP and Josie confide in one another that, despite what was said in the cellar, they do not romantically like each other.
30	6	"Episode 6"	Jamie Jay Johnson	Tony Roche	28 March 2016	TBA
Vod is still making things up to the housemates after the house was broken into and trashed by the drug dealers she hired as security for Vodstock as they are enjoying their freedom on the morning of results. However, when the results come in, not everything is expected. Howard receives his first class degree, Kingsley a 2:1 and JP a third. A crushed Oregon struggles to make sense of her 2:2 particularly so when Vod unexpectedly receives a 2:1. Unable to process her result, Oregon lies to her parents and tells them she received a first, fictionally fulfilling their pressing expectations of her. Basking in the glory of her result, the housemates remind Vod of the pending alternative graduation ball and the fact she has no money to create it, with a thousand students anticipating a fantastic night ahead. Howard expresses his nerves about moving to London and beginning his job at Ordnance Survey, suggesting the group house share in London, to which they quietly agree would be a good idea, but when he advances plans and finds a property, they later come clean. Josie admits to JP that she wishes to maintain their sexual relationship, which they developed in the year, after he leaves but asks him to keep it a secret. After quickly considering a PGCE, Oregon frantically applies for a plethora of Master's degrees in creative writing, expressing her newfound desire to be a novelist and is rapidly accepted for a place in Manchester. She discovers, however, on the day of graduation with her mother that she was only accepted onto the course as it was run by Professor Shales, who deliberately perverted her application and awarded her a place. This adds to her mother's horror when she also finds out that Oregon had an affair with him, is known by a nickname, was impeached from office as President of the Student Union, received only a 2:2 and got a student deported by injuring him sexually. Vod interjects to Oregon's defence, suggesting that her mother consider all the good qualities in her daughter, identifying positives in this string of incidents her mother feels humiliated about. The group are then confronted by students demanding to know details about Vodstock only to assume that Vod has 'done a runner' – something she previously intended. They then find her back at the house, which she has decided to use as the venue for the ball, much to JP's protests, telling them that she considers them her family and is determined to make things right for good after the house was robbed. The party turns out to be a success, despite the housemate's worries regarding the house struggling to cope with the capacity of people it holds; the police later turn up and Vod shuts it down. JP confronts and shuns a drunken Tomothy whose sexual advances make Josie uncomfortable, declaring that he does not intend to take up the job his brother has set out for him and that he will do whatever he wants, despite his brother's audacious attempts at emotional blackmail mentioning their dead father, in an attempt to make him see sense about his future. The housemates later sit on a small hill overlooking Manchester as the sun rises. Howard reveals he has found a new three-bed house share. Vod reassures Oregon she doesn't need to be accepted onto a course to be a novelist. She jumps on the idea, saying she will write a novel set in Laos, where she plans to move. After long consideration, Josie decides to make a go of a proper (long distance) relationship with JP, but he accepts under the obligation that she make it public, only to find that the other four are happy for them and encourage the relationship. He then says he has made up his mind about his career ambitions and wishes to become an estate agent. Kingsley, who decides to quit pursuing a job he was given after finding out that it was unpaid and move back in with his mother, accepts JP's offer to instead move in with him. Oregon asks Vod to come to Laos with her, suggesting she could teach English there as she writes her novel. With no plans for the road ahead, Vod agrees and the two eagerly set off. Before leaving the house, JP and Kingsley find out that Howard has always lived in Manchester, and that his family home is not in Scotland, but two streets away – a secret he kept because he felt his parents embarrassed him. The series closes with Josie nostalgically walking round the now empty and bare 28 Hartnell Avenue as she comes to terms with the fact she will not be with the group in her final year, before setting off, looking noticeably sadder. In a final deleted scene of the episode, the six main characters catch up through a Skype call. JP is working hard as an estate agent and happily flat sharing with Kingsley and Howard, who joined them after concerns over the people he had initially planned to live with. Oregon is embracing life in Laos, Vod has accidentally ended up in Vietnam and Josie can be seen in her room of the house, ready to face the challenges of third year.
