= Ursula Rani Sarma =

Irish playwright and screenwriter

- Sarma at the 2026 BFI London Film Festival
- Born: 1977 or 1978 (age 47–48)
- Education: University College Cork
- Occupations: Playwright; screenwriter

Ursula Rani Sarma (born 1977/1978) is an Irish playwright and screenwriter.

== Biography ==
Sarma grew up in Lahinch, County Clare, Ireland. Her father is of Indian descent, while her mother is Irish. She attended University College Cork for her undergraduate degree. She is now based in London.

She began directing and writing plays while a student at University College Cork. Sarma has been a writer in residence at Paines Plough. Additionally, Sarma has written television, contributing episodes to RAW, Red Rock, Delicious and most recently, the crime drama Smother.

== Works ==
=== Theatre ===
- Like Sugar on Skin (1999)
- Touched (1999)
- Blue (2000)
- Wanderings (2000)
- Gift (2001)
- The Magic Tree (2008)
- The Dark Things (2009). Selected as Best New Play and Best Production at the 2010 Critics' Awards for Theatre in Scotland.
- An adaptation of Lorca's Yerma (2011)
- Evening Train (2019). A musical, based on the album of the same name by Mick Flannery.
- A Thousand Splendid Suns. A stage adatation of the novel by Khalid Hosseini.

=== Television ===
- Smother (Series 1-2, 2021-2022)
- Bodkin (2024)
- The Split Up (2026).
