= Lip Service (TV series) =

British television drama (2010-2012)

- Created by: Harriet Braun
- Written by: Harriet Braun
- Directed by: John McKay
- Country of origin: United Kingdom
- No. of series: 2
- No. of episodes: 12

Production
- Executive producer: Derek Wax
- Production companies: Kudos Film & Television; BBC Scotland

Original release
- Network: BBC Three
- Release: 12 October 2010 – 25 May 2012

Lip Service is a British television drama portraying the lives of a group of lesbian and bisexual women living in Glasgow, Scotland. Production on the show, which stars Laura Fraser, Ruta Gedmintas and Fiona Button, began in summer 2009 in Glasgow. The show debuted on BBC Three on 12 October 2010. Filming on a second series was confirmed in late 2010, with filming beginning on 30 May 2011. The second series aired on BBC Three from 20 April 2012. In January 2013, the show's creator, Harriet Braun, announced that BBC Three had cancelled the series without explanation.

== Cast ==
| Actor | Character | Role | Series |
|---|---|---|---|
| Laura Fraser | Cat MacKenzie | A lesbian architect with an anxious, neurotic personality. She is constantly torn between an old love or a new future. | 1–2 |
| Ruta Gedmintas | Frankie Alan | A "4 on the Kinsey Scale" bisexual photographer who is brash and impulsive, known for her promiscuous ways. She is secretly still in love with Cat, even though she abandoned her prior to the series. | 1–2 |
| Fiona Button | Tess Roberts | A struggling lesbian actress who is often unlucky in love, which causes her to feel insecure. | 1–2 |
| Emun Elliott | Jay Bryan Adams | Cat's friend and co-worker, a straight male who often can't restrain himself where beautiful women are concerned. | 1–2 |
| James Anthony Pearson | Ed MacKenzie | Cat's younger brother who is straight, a science-fiction author who shares Tess' frustrations with their romantic lives. | 1–2 |
| Roxanne McKee | Lou Foster | A television personality who is in the closet about her same-sex relationship with Tess, wavering between her feelings and her career. | 1 |
| Heather Peace | Detective Sergeant Sam Murray | Cat's girlfriend throughout the series, a fiercely independent lesbian woman who is afraid to show vulnerability. | 1–2 |
| Natasha O'Keeffe | Sadie Anderson | A notorious bad girl who dates Frankie briefly but then breaks off the relationship. | 1–2 |
| Cush Jumbo | Becky Love | Jay's fiancée, who apparently brought an end to his promiscuous ways. | 1 |
| Anna Skellern | Dr. Lexy Price | A hospital doctor and roommate to Tess and Frankie/Sadie, who often laments her poor choices in romantic partners. | 2 |
| Adam Sinclair | Dr. Declan Love | Lexy's gay co-worker. | 2 |
| Alana Hood | Nurse Bea | Lexy's married bisexual co-worker, with whom she has a no-strings-attached relationship. | 2 |

== Episodes ==
=== Series 1 ===
| No. | Title | Directed by | Written by | Original release date | Prod. code | Viewers (millions) |
|---|---|---|---|---|---|---|
| 1 | "Episode 1" | John McKay | Harriet Braun | 12 October 2010 | 101 | 580,000 |
When Frankie returns from New York City to Glasgow after getting news of her aunt's death, her sudden reappearance rocks ex-girlfriend Cat, who is re-entering the dating scene after Frankie left her heartbroken two years earlier. Cat's mind is preoccupied with thoughts of Frankie during her blind date with policewoman Sam. Aspiring actress Tess has an embarrassing run-in with her ex-girlfriend Chloe, but things start to look up when she finds herself being hit on by a gorgeous, and supposedly straight, TV presenter named Lou. Things get passionate between Tess and Lou when Tess spends the night at Lou's flat.
| 2 | "Episode 2" | John McKay | Harriet Braun | 19 October 2010 | 102 | 579,000 |
Frankie puts herself in danger as she follows a lead that might unravel the mystery of her past. Fate gives Cat a second chance when she runs into policewoman Sam, but she may not truly be ready to forget Frankie. Tess makes a fool of herself on live television and it becomes clear that Lou is nowhere near ready to go public with their relationship. However, Lou comes on to Tess in private and they have sex at Tess' flat, as Tess starts falling deeper in love with Lou.
| 3 | "Episode 3" | Harry Bradbeer | Chloe Moss | 26 October 2010 | 103 | 464,000 |
Cat and Sam are enjoying a honeymoon period, but cracks begin to show as Frankie's presence becomes an issue. Jay sets out to prove that he's not too old for the office intern, but has to think on his feet when a flirtatious encounter leaves her unconscious. Tess gets more than she bargained for when she turns up at Lou's flat unannounced, and sees Lou with a boyfriend. There's a shocking revelation that throws Frankie's very identity into question.
| 4 | "Episode 4" | Harry Bradbeer | Julie Gearey | 2 November 2010 | 104 | 580,000 |
Cat puts her relationship on the line when she lies to Sam while Tess tries internet dating but finds no luck. Frankie and Jay make what seems to be a big mistake.
| 5 | "Episode 5" | Julian Holmes | John Jackson | 9 November 2010 | 105 | 508,000 |
It's Tess's birthday but the party does not quite go as planned.
| 6 | "Episode 6" | Julian Holmes | Harriet Braun | 16 November 2010 | 106 | 534,000 |
Tess has an audition that could change her career but gets stuck in a lift with Jay. Meanwhile Sam confronts Frankie, leaving the latter to buy a ticket to go back to New York. Cat attempts to stop Frankie from leaving Glasgow.

=== Series 2 ===
| No. | Title | Directed by | Written by | Original release date | Prod. code | Viewers (millions) |
|---|---|---|---|---|---|---|
| 1 | "Episode 1" | Sallie Aprahamian | Harriet Braun | 20 April 2012 | 201 | TBA |
After a loved-up month in South America, Cat and Sam arrive back in Glasgow. Having run away from her affair with Frankie, Cat has to deal with seeing her again. Tess has it all – new job, pad and girlfriend – but her first day at work and the arrival of a new flatmate throws up some surprises.
| 2 | "Episode 2" | Sallie Aprahamian | Harriet Braun | 27 April 2012 | 202 | TBA |
It's Cat's birthday and Sam has planned the perfect day, but Cat feels like a total fraud because she's still sleeping with Frankie, who offers her a very different sort of present. When Tess leaves work early, events take an unexpected turn.
| 3 | "Episode 3" | Sallie Aprahamian | John Jackson | 4 May 2012 | 203 | TBA |
Sam struggles to deal with everyone fussing around her, while Sadie catches the eye of fearsome magazine editor Lauren during a job interview. Frankie makes a drastic decision. Tess enlists Ed's help with the difficult Nora, but is unprepared for the consequences. Lauren and Sadie end up having sex at Lauren's workplace
| 4 | "Episode 4" | Jill Robertson | Rachel Anthony | 11 May 2012 | 204 | TBA |
Sadie's irreverent take on waitressing lands her in trouble, and when Lauren turns up at the restaurant to apologise for snubbing her in the office, the pair end up spending an afternoon in a hotel room having passionate sex. Lexy suspects Bea is jealous of her plan to take Sam to a wine-tasting event, causing her to question whether their casual arrangement is as straightforward as she thought, while Tess goes on an impromptu blind date with Meg, a friend of Nora and Ed's.
| 5 | "Episode 5" | Jill Robertson | Louise Ironside | 18 May 2012 | 205 | TBA |
When Sam makes an unexpected visit to the flat, a wedge is driven between her and her friends. The situation with Lexy's stalker intensifies but luckily Tess is on hand to help, although Hugh proves an obstacle. Sadie's relationship with Lauren heats up even more.
| 6 | "Episode 6" | Jill Robertson | Lena Rae | 25 May 2012 | 206 | TBA |
On the day of her first performance, Tess has high hopes for her and Lexy, but things go far from smoothly at the theatre. Sam is also under pressure to lead a major drugs bust, but Ryder is not sure that she's ready. Sadie's weakness for temptation leads her into hot water. Despite Tess desiring a relationship with Lexy and them seemingly growing closer, Lexy stands Tess up and gets passionate with Sam instead.

== Production ==
Braun was asked by the BBC to create a UK-based lesbian drama; she stated that the first scene that came to mind when she began writing was "a woman crying in an inappropriate place after finding out her ex is seeing someone else" followed by "someone returning from New York and throwing her ex into a state of panic". Those two scenes resulted in the creation of the three lead characters: Cat and Frankie, and Tess.

Braun gave each of the actors an outline of their character, and then let them develop the full characterisation. For Gedmintas, this included cutting her previously long blond hair to a close cut bob. A rumor arose that the director gave each cast member a manual on lesbian sex, which they were expected to read before shooting began, but Braun confirmed in interview with the Star Observer that this was only a myth. The first series was shot in its entirety in Glasgow in winter 2009/10.

== Reception ==
=== Ratings ===
The first episode debuted with 580,000 viewers, picking up an additional 8,000 viewers on the BBC HD channel. It had an audience share of 4.4%.

=== Critical response ===
The opening episode received mixed reviews from critics. Claudia Cahalane of The Guardian wrote that it was "hugely significant" for a drama to normalise lesbian and bisexual relationships, citing a study of BBC output which found that lesbians contributed to just two minutes of programming from a randomly selected 39 hours of broadcasts. While Cahalane expressed disappointment that the episode did not represent butch lesbians, she deemed it "important to recognise Lip Service for the great service it's doing to British lesbians." Keith Watson of the Metro attacked the series' tokenism, suggesting that it included lipstick lesbian clichés to meet the BBC's diversity quota, and commenting that, "It was trying so hard to be modern and liberated but it felt tired and lazy". The Independent's Amol Rajan criticized the episode's "pathetically vacuous plot", calling the series "spirit-cripplingly tedious". He expressed sympathy for the "clearly talented" cast, opining: "In trying to make a point about the importance of engaging with lesbian issues, this show ends up trivialising them. The lesbians are presented to us not as interesting people, or characters who warrant sympathy; rather, they matter purely because of their sexual preferences. That is immature, patronising, and unrealistic." Evangelical pressure group the Christian Institute reported that the episode had prompted complaints from viewers over its sexual content.
