= Fresh Meat (TV series) =

British comedy-drama television series

- Genre: Comedy drama
- Created by: Jesse Armstrong; Sam Bain
- Starring: Zawe Ashton; Greg McHugh; Kimberley Nixon; Charlotte Ritchie; Joe Thomas; Jack Whitehall; Jelka van Houten; Faye Marsay; Robert Webb; Tony Gardner
- Music by: Christian Henson
- Country of origin: United Kingdom
- Original language: English
- No. of series: 4
- No. of episodes: 30 (list of episodes)

Production
- Production locations: The Sharp Project, Manchester
- Camera setup: Single-camera
- Running time: 41 minutes
- Production companies: Lime Pictures (Liverpool), Objective Productions (London)

Original release
- Network: Channel 4
- Release: 21 September 2011 – 28 March 2016

Fresh Meat is a British comedy-drama television series created by Jesse Armstrong and Sam Bain, who also created Peep Show.

The first episode, directed by David Kerr, was broadcast on Channel 4 on 21 September 2011, and the show aired on Wednesdays at 10 pm. The second series started airing on 9 October 2012 and consists of 8 episodes. On 22 November 2012, a third series was commissioned and began broadcasting on 4 November 2013. Bain said ideas were being developed for a potential film adaptation, following the runaway success of 2011's The Inbetweeners Movie. Instead, a fourth series followed, filmed in 2015 and aired in February 2016 as a conclusion to the series.

== Plot ==
The stories revolve around the lives of six students; Vod, Oregon, Josie, Kingsley, JP, and Howard – who are freshers (with the exception of Howard) at the fictional Manchester Medlock University (loosely based on Manchester Metropolitan University). Due to having applied late to accommodation, they live in a shared house off-campus in Whalley Range, Manchester rather than university halls of residence.

Main themes include: Oregon's insecurity and failed relationship with her English literature lecturer, Tony Shales; Vod's hedonistic, carefree lifestyle; Josie and Kingsley's tortured relationship; upper-class JP's attempts at popularity and impressing girls, and Howard's numerous eccentricities. On a larger scale, the series covers such student-related issues as financial issues, work pressures, grades, expulsion, partying, and internship competition. The final series involves job seeking, final exam pressure, and the value of degrees.

== Episodes ==
Series	Episodes	Originally released		DVD released
Series	Episodes	First released	Last released	DVD released
1	8	21 September 2011	16 November 2011	8 October 2012
2	8	9 October 2012	27 November 2012	11 November 2013
3	8	4 November 2013	23 December 2013	26 December 2013
4	6	22 February 2016	28 March 2016	4 April 2016

== Characters ==
=== Main ===
- Zawe Ashton as Violet "Vod" Nordstrom: A literature student and military brat, she is studying at the university on an RAF Officer Bursary. Vod appears streetwise, forthright, completely care-free and alludes to having anti-establishment views. She is the life and soul of any party, often drinks too much (a middle aged writer died from consuming the same amount as her) and takes hard drugs. Her university grades are poor and she regularly talks Oregon into allowing her to plagiarize her work. Despite her beliefs, she is fond of Oregon, who is from a privileged background, and helps her through some of her most difficult phases. While she is the first to shirk her workload in favour of a party, we occasionally see her become deeply distressed at the prospect of her work being evaluated, and it is implied that a large part of her apparent ambivalence towards her course can be attributed to a fear of failure coupled with her awareness that she has not received the same level of secondary education as her peers. In the pilot she tells Josie that she didn't study A-levels, and in one of the final episodes she responds to criticism of her ostensibly lackadaisical approach to her studies by pointing out that she had to work extremely hard to be accepted to university, juggling a factory job and an Access course in the evenings. This insecurity is further complicated by her abusive alcoholic mother, Chris, who refers to her as "the millstone around my neck". In the fourth series, it is revealed that she has amassed more than £70,000 of debt over the course of her degree, and her career prospects and ambitions are non-existent. This, however, proves to be the wake-up call she needs, and she puts in extra effort for her final exams, ultimately finishing with upper second-class honours (a "2:1"), a much higher grade than she was expecting. She later agrees to accompany Oregon to Laos.
- Greg McHugh as Howard McGregor: A Scottish geology student who is older than the others, having previously done a year in Philosophy but changed courses after disagreements with professors. Howard is eccentric, socially inept and has many strange mannerisms. He is also the only non-freshman in the house, and the only housemate who does not demonstrate even the remotest interest in politics. With the exception of his housemates, he has few friends, but is usually friendly and well mannered. The housemates tend to approach him with caution, and his behaviour has occasionally cost them popularity. He does not socially interact very often, but has had a sexual fling with former housemate Sabine, and took a liking to Sam in the early parts of the third series. In the fifth episode of the third series, he is shown to be somewhat attracted to Candice, and they later form a relationship. His surname changes twice through the series: in series 1, it is Rowbottom; in series 2, it is MacCallum; and in series 3 and 4, it is McGregor. This is due to wanting to remain as anonymous and off the grid as possible, noting that he redacts his middle name from his Ordnance Survey job application, and has wiped his date of birth from the internet – ultimately, it is confirmed in series 4 that Howard's real surname is McGregor. In the fourth series Howard's reclusion worsens, becoming obsessed with studying for his final exams and partly due to breaking up with Candice. He eventually manages to secure a position at Ordnance Survey, despite his fears of living in London. In keeping with his superior intellect to the rest of the group, he is the highest achieving of all, finishing the year with first-class honours ("a one" or "a first"), and being the only one to leave with secure employment. It is revealed in the last episode of the series that he does not actually live in Scotland as he had led everyone to believe, but rather a few streets down from the house where the gang have been living for three years, and he had neglected to tell anyone because his parents embarrassed him. In a deleted scene, it's revealed that Howard later moves in with JP and Kingsley in Chelsea.
- Kimberley Nixon as Josephine "Josie" Jones: A pharmacology student from Aberbeeg, who previously took dentistry and afterwards zoology. While initially coming across as sensible, shy, and sweet natured (Oregon describes her as "perfect wife material") Josie soon turns out to be quite stubborn, foul-mouthed, short-tempered, and selfish. Furthermore, she is something of an alcoholic, although she later tries to turn over a new leaf in series 3 when it lands her in trouble. Her personality problems are most often seen in her interactions with Kingsley, with whom she has a complicated and tortured relationship, a result of their mutual attraction. While the two started off on amiable terms, the sexual tension between them grew as a result of numerous heart-to-heart conversations through the paper-thin wall separating their rooms, which was complicated by her failing relationship with boyfriend and later fiancé Dave. In the second series, this becomes even further fraught when Kingsley forms a relationship with her new friend, Heather. Josie moves to Southampton to study zoology at the end of the second series, having been kicked off her dentistry course (due to drilling through someone's cheek while hungover during a dentistry practical). By the third series, they are able to finally form a relationship, and Josie returns to Manchester to take pharmacology. However, numerous attempts at making their relationship work, including a bonding trip, a "relationship amnesty" and exploring an open relationship, only led to further emotional pain for both. The two reluctantly decided to take a break from each other at the end of the third series to ensure that they did not damage their friendship as well. She takes beta blockers, implying she suffers from anxiety or stress. She does not demonstrate much interest in politics, although she often makes sarcastic comments about contentious political issues. In the fourth series, both she and Kingsley's feelings for each other have completely gone, although it is clear that she still feels sadness at its failure. She attempts to remedy this by having meaningless sex with JP, all the while scared of the looming prospect of spending the final year of her degree without her friends. In the latter part of the series, she struggles to come to terms with the fact that she may like JP, and her efforts to do so only hurt his feelings. Eventually, he forces her to acknowledge them publicly to the group, and they agree to form a relationship long-distance. The series ultimately closes with Josie doing a final round of her now-empty house, her sadness at bidding goodbye to her friends, and the prospect of an entire year alone in it plain on her face as she leaves for the station.
- Charlotte Ritchie as Melissa "Oregon" Shawcross: Oregon is a literature student and, like JP, from a privileged background. An idealist, Oregon is paranoid about how she is perceived by her peers, and believes that her privileged upbringing will negatively affect this. When she first arrives at university, she gives herself the nickname "Oregon", makes a clear effort to hide her background and immediately befriends Vod, the most outgoing and party-loving of the housemates. She attempts to emulate Vod in as many ways as possible, enthusiastically agreeing with every anti-establishment or anti-elitist view Vod expresses, even if she is guilty of what Vod is criticising. Despite discovering the truth about Oregon, Vod remains genuinely fond of her, and the two are close friends. She embarks on an affair with her lecturer, Tony Shales, and later unknowingly forms a relationship with his son, Dylan. The relationships end at the end of the second series. Oregon fancies herself as a political activist, but often displays a lack of understanding of contentious issues. After spending most of the third series running for Student Union presidency, she discovers the difficulty of the post, and spends the early part of the fourth series trying to enjoy the power of the job, despite the obvious lack of respect she commands, and budgetary problems. Eventually, her arrogance and unwillingness to admit her own mistakes lead to her being impeached from the post, and rejected from the prestigious Fulbright Scholarship in the USA. Her horrific final year is capped when she is awarded lower second-class honours (a "2:2"), far lower than her parents expected of her, and when she attempts to apply for a master's degree, she is given a place on Tony Shales's course purely because of his desire to get back together with her. Vod ultimately stands up for her to her overbearing mother, and the series ends with Oregon moving to Laos to write a novel, with Vod accompanying her.
- Joe Thomas as Kingsley Owen: A geology student (who switched briefly to drama before reverting to geology in series 1) from Essex, who has only just been let off the leash after having spent many years living on a council estate, caring for his infirm, overbearing mother. He is friendly and charming, and more measured than everyone else, but is also incredibly insecure, unconfident, and prone to making rash decisions that he comes to regret. In addition, he is afraid of confrontation and causing distress, but his efforts to avoid these situations inadvertently cause more problems for him. He is also an aspiring musician. He has a tortured relationship with Josie, a result of them sharing a mutual attraction to one another. Despite claiming to have had many sexual encounters in the past, he later reveals he is a virgin and, after a fling with drama student Ruth, is no longer a virgin. He started a relationship with Josie in the third series, but reluctantly agrees to take a break from her at the end of the series in order to salvage what was left of their friendship. Unlike his housemates, who are largely ignorant and idealistic, Kingsley has a reasonably advanced political compass, and his political preference is often hinted to be centre-left. In the fourth series, it is revealed he wishes to work in radio media, and he comes to the horrified realisation that geology might not have been the correct degree. He forms a relationship with a Swiss-Italian woman called Rosa, but she breaks up with him because of his insecurity over the fact she has a son not that much younger than him. Subsequently, he is shocked to discover Josie and JP are having sex, but eventually begrudgingly gives them his approval. At the end of the series, he obtains upper second-class honours, and an unpaid internship in London, and realises this will mean having to return to Essex and live with his mother. He is saved from this fate, however, when JP suggests he come and live with him rent-free in Chelsea.
- Jack Whitehall as Jonathan "J.P." Pembersley: JP is a geology student and an Old Stoic who failed to get into a "proper" university. He is arrogant, has an air of cockiness and entitlement about him, and tends to look down on his fellow students. His tendency to make condescending and arrogant remarks annoys the other housemates, although Kingsley, with whom he has a tenuous friendship, usually gives as good as he gets. Unlike Oregon, he is open about his privileged background, and speaks with a posh accent. His efforts to appear "cool" often lead him into trouble. In fact, he is one of the most sensitive characters on the show. On occasion, he will let his guard down, and reveal his inner pain, such as his detached relationship with his parents and troubled childhood, his lack of a love life and the fact that he is indeed insecure about how his privilege is viewed by his peers. This is most notable in the third series, when his failed attempt to court Sam revealed a more downcast and vulnerable side to his personality. He displays only a minor interest in politics, and does not make his political beliefs clear, with the exception of mocking the Labour candidate in the union president election. In the fourth series, it is revealed he doesn't watch the news or keep up to date with current events. It is also revealed he has unrealistic and barely existent career ambitions, and is seemingly doomed to working a job organised by his overbearing older brother, Tomothy. True to form, he finishes the series with third-class honours ("a three" or "a third"). However, after Vod throws a party in his house without his permission, forcing him to take a more authoritative stance against the guests, he finally stands up to his brother and tells him he does not want his job, and to stop treating him like a child, before forcing Josie to acknowledge her feelings for him publicly, rather than hiding them and treating him as if he were repulsive. He also demonstrates how much he values Kingsley as a friend by asking him to come live with him, before revealing he plans to use his family's connections to find employment with Foxtons.

=== Recurring characters ===
- Tony Gardner as Professor Tony Shales – Oregon's charming, somewhat pretentious English lecturer and love interest turned stalker.
- Sara Stewart as Professor Jean Shales (series 1–2) – Tony's wife, whom Oregon initially idolises. When she learns of Oregon's affairs with both her husband and son, though, their professional relationship ends.
- Jack Fox as Ralph (series 1–3) – an Old Stoic from JP's year, and an acquaintance of his.
- Robert Webb as Dan (series 1; guest series 2) – Kingsley, JP and Howard's geology lecturer. He is an inept instructor and overly sensitive about complaints, which makes him seek petty revenge against Kingsley.
- James Musgrave as Toby (series 1; guest series 2) – an Old Stoic, and acquaintance of J.P's
- Adam Gillen as Brian (series 1) – a nerdy young man who befriends Howard.
- Gemma Chan as Ruth (series 1) – a drama student who takes a shine to Kingsley.
- Ben McGregor as Dave (series 1) – Josie's boyfriend and fiancé, he is a surly tough guy who marries another woman soon after learning that Josie slept with both JP and Kingsley.
- Paul Lamb, "the Invisible Man" (series 1) – an unseen housemate whose presence in (and absence from) the house is barely noticed.
- Jelka van Houten as Sabine (series 2–3; guest series 4) – a Dutch PhD student who replaces Paul Lamb as a housemate. Humourless, daunting, and much older than the others, she finds her housemates generally irritating.
- Sophie Wu as Heather (series 2–3) – a British Hong Konger dentistry student and friend of Josie's who begins to date Kingsley, causing friction in her friendship with Josie.
- Ronan Raftery as Dylan Shales (series 2) – Oregon's boyfriend, who turns out to be the son of Professors Jean and Tony Shales.
- Hannah Britland as Sam (series 3) – a love interest for JP and Howard, over whom they fight, and later a friend and potential love interest for Kingsley.
- Faye Marsay as Candice Pelling (series 3): A first-year literature student who is a new tenant in the house in the third series. She is gifted at literature, often making Oregon jealous of her abilities. She and Howard connect emotionally, and eventually form a relationship. Candice leaves the house after the third series, and she and Howard break up after they spend less time together.
- Peter Gadiot as Javier (series 3) – Vod's Mexican holiday fling, whom she marries in an attempt to dump him.
- Catherine Steadman as Alison (series 3) – the outgoing president of the student union. She dislikes Oregon and takes satisfaction in her difficulties as student body president.
- Richard Goulding as Tomothy (series 4) – J.P.'s older brother who visits the house to discuss J.P.'s future after university.
- Ayda Field as Rosa (series 4) – a university support officer and aide to Oregon, who quickly develops a relationship with Kingsley.

== Production ==
Jesse Armstrong and Sam Bain created Fresh Meat's characters and wrote the first episode whilst watching The Young Ones on VHS; subsequent episodes were written by other writers. Bain has explained the reasons for this approach: "We always imagined this as a team-written show partly for practical reasons because Peep Show has been recommissioned, and moving forward if we're lucky enough to get another series of Fresh Meat we simply couldn't write two shows at once. So we always knew we wanted to bring other writers on board, some are more experienced, some very talented women writers, and one who had just graduated when we started writing."

Fresh Meat is produced by Liverpool-based Lime Pictures and London-based Objective Productions. The programme was filmed at The Sharp Project in Manchester, a £16.5 million studio facility built to fill the void when Granada Studios closed in 2013. The programme is set in Manchester, and some location scenes are filmed on the campus of the real life Manchester Metropolitan University (close to the River Medlock) – including scenes set within the students' union, which are filmed in the students' union of Manchester Metropolitan University. Scenes in the characters' local pub are filmed at the King's Arms in Salford. Many exterior shots were filmed at the University of Manchester's main Oxford Road campus – particularly outside the library – and in series 2, the University of Salford's library and many exterior parts of the campus were used as a set. 28 Hartnell Avenue, the Victorian house in which the students live, is in fact 28 Mayfield Road in Whalley Range.

Channel 4 announced that a second series had been commissioned in October 2011. Filming was completed in August 2012, and the series started broadcasting that following October. A third series was confirmed via Twitter following the second series' finale. Filming of Series 4 began in March 2015 and wrapped on 28 May 2015.

== Reception ==
Critical reaction to the first series' opening episodes was mixed, with reviews becoming more positive as the series progressed. The Guardian gave the opening episode a very positive review, finding it "sharp" and "refreshingly gag-dense". The Independent's review was also positive, saying "what really holds the thing together is an underlying sympathy, the sense that these characters might be comically foolish but they aren't (with some exceptions) contemptible."

However, Michael Deacon in The Daily Telegraph called the opening episode's script "a torrent of prattling self-hatred" and found the episode "drainingly bleak". Rupert Christiansen, also in the Telegraph, was similarly unimpressed, calling it "[p]athetically laboured and over-acted" and "limply written and predictable". Rachel Cooke of New Statesman felt the opening episode was a "damp squib" and commented that this might be because "the writers failed to remember that going to university is also rather melancholic, what with all the loneliness, the strange and soon-to-be-shed new friends and the general exhaustion of trying to act cool and grown-up".

By the end of the first series, the Radio Times said the show had been "full of well-worked plotlines and gorgeous character comedy", and The Daily Telegraph praised "the series' admirable habit of stirring pathos into the flow of gags" as well as complimenting the scripts and performances. The Guardian felt it had "managed to live up to sky-scraping expectations", and Metro said "Originally billed as a university version of The Inbetweeners, Fresh Meat has developed into something much more sophisticated than its more-established sibling."

The second series continued to receive positive reviews, with The Observer declaring the second episode "almost an hour of laugh-out-loud comic astuteness that single-handedly restored faith in the British ability to be funny", while The Independent on Sunday said "First time round, the student sitcom was chipper but clunky fare. But, just as its freshman gang have grown up, so the whole thing has become sharper, wiser, and more lovable".

The third series also continued to receive positive reviews. Andrew Collins of The Guardian identified some similarities between Fresh Meat and The Young Ones, but he suggested that "to say that Fresh Meat is a Young Ones for the Jägerbomb generation does neither show justice" and said "The Young Ones was like being picked up by the lapels and repeatedly shaken. Fresh Meat is more like being invited to stay". Collins also recognised Jack Whitehall's performance as J.P. and refuted Jonathan Ross's quip at the British Comedy Awards that, as an actor, Whitehall has "less range than a North Korean missile", adding that Whitehall's performance deepens with each episode.

Thomas H. Green of The Arts Desk wrote that, after "rocky" earlier episodes of the third season, the finale of the third season of Fresh Meat had "retrieved its sterling reputation". Green suggested the circumstances in the seventh episode of the season were incredible and "reality was pushed too far" but conceded that the finale delivered, with Kingsley and Josie's "soul-wringing, half-hearted" attempt at an open relationship and then the "wrenching" dissolution of their relationship for the sake of their friendship; Vod's wildly promising run at president of the student union and then sabotaging her own campaign to mend her friendship with Oregon, who wins but inherits dire straits facing the student union and its executive; the development and progression of Howard and Candice's relationship, culminating in romance; and JP, who "applies for a position" with (or attempts to seduce) Josie (who is in an open relationship) via a PowerPoint presentation, moves on from Sam, cleans the house and attempts to sell it, and laments that he is "horny".

=== Awards and nominations ===
==== Series 1 ====
Year	Awards	Category	Nominee(s)	Result	Notes
2011	British Comedy Awards	Best New Comedy		Won	
2011	British Comedy Awards	Best Comedy Drama		Nominated	Won by Psychoville.
2011	British Comedy Awards	Best TV Comedy Actor	Jack Whitehall	Nominated	Won by Darren Boyd.
2012	NME Awards	Best TV Show		Won	
2012	Loaded LAFTAs	Funniest TV Show		Won	
2012	Royal Television Society Awards	Best Scripted Comedy		Won	
2012	Royal Television Society Awards	Best Writer – Comedy	Jesse Armstrong and Sam Bain	Won	For episode 1.
2012	Broadcasting Press Guild TV and Radio Awards	Breakthrough Award	Jack Whitehall	Nominated	Won by Olivia Colman.
2012	Broadcasting Press Guild TV and Radio Awards	Best Comedy/Entertainment		Nominated	Won by Rev.
2012	South Bank Sky Arts Awards	Best Comedy		Won	
2012	BAFTA Craft Awards	Breakthrough Talent	Tom Basden	Nominated	Won by Kwadjo Dajan for Appropriate Adult.
2012	BAFTA Television Awards	Situation Comedy		Nominated	Won by Mrs Brown's Boys.
2012	BAFTA Television Awards	YouTube Audience Award		Nominated	Won by Celebrity Juice.
2012	The British Comedy Guide Comedy.co.uk Awards	Best British TV Comedy Drama		Won	
2013	Monte-Carlo Television Festival	Best European Comedy TV Series		Won	

==== Series 2 ====
Year	Awards	Category	Nominee(s)	Result	Notes
2012	The British Comedy Guide Comedy.co.uk Awards	Best British TV Comedy Drama		Won	
