= Derek Wax =

British television producer

- Born: Manchester, England
- Education: The Manchester Grammar School; Balliol College, Oxford
- Occupations: Managing Director of Wild Mercury Productions, TV producer and executive producer
- Known for: Sex Traffic - Producer; Occupation - Executive Producer; The Hour - Executive Producer; Humans - Executive Producer The Rig - Executive Producer

Derek Wax is a British television executive producer. His work includes The Rig, The Sixth Commandment, Sex Traffic, Occupation, The Hour, Troy: Fall of a City, Capital, Humans, Lip Service, Tsunami: The Aftermath and From There to Here. He was a producer at Granada TV from 2001 to 2005 and an Executive Producer at Kudos from 2005 to 2017.

Wax started his career working in London-based theatres before moving to the BBC to work in television production. He was an Executive Producer at Kudos from 2005 to 2017. He left Kudos to launch his new label Wild Mercury Productions in 2017.

Wax's first major work came as a producer of the drama Flesh and Blood for BBC2 in 2002. This was followed by the Channel 4 series Sex Traffic, which won a number of BAFTA awards including Best Serial, also the RTS award for Best Mini Series, and the Prix Italia.

His first role as an executive producer came on the BBC and HBO mini-series, Tsunami: The Aftermath. In 2009, he produced the BBC mini-series, Occupation. Since then he has been executive producer on The Hour.

In 2015, Wax was executive producer of the BBC miniseries Capital. Between 2014 and 2018, he was executive producer of three seasons of AMC and Channel 4 series Humans. In 2020 he was announced as executive producer of the Amazon original series The Rig, and of mini series The Sixth Commandment for BBC One. In 2023 The Rig launched across all Amazon territories, and was renewed for a second series. The Sixth Commandment aired on BBC One in 2023. In 2024 it won the BAFTA and RTS Awards for Best Limited Series and awards for key cast, including BAFTA and International Emmy awards for leading actor for Timothy Spall and RTS award for Supporting Actor for Eanna Hardwicke. In 2023 Amazon announced a new mini series Fear, starring Martin Compston and Anjli Mohindra. The series filmed in Glasgow in 2024 and aired on Prime Video in 2025.

== Early life and education ==
Wax was educated at Manchester Grammar School and graduated from Balliol College, Oxford with a degree in English Language and Literature. His brother Kenny Wax is a theatre producer, whose productions include The Play That Goes Wrong and Six the Musical.

== Directing career ==
=== Theatre ===
His career began in theatre, starting as an assistant director at the Greenwich Theatre and Albery Theatre on a production of Chekhov's Three Sisters. He was a staff director at the Royal National Theatre in 1989 and 1990, before working at a number of London-based theatres where he directed numerous plays, including Ivan Klíma's Games at the Gate Theatre, Patrick's Day at the Battersea Arts Centre, No Remission at the Lyric Theatre in Hammersmith and The Life of the World to Come at the Almeida Theatre.

=== Television ===
His TV career began in 1995 when he moved to BBC Drama Series and Serials as a script editor. He script edited the two-part Minette Walters serial The Ice House and the Stella Tillyard BBC/WGBH mini-series Aristocrats.

His debut as a TV producer came on the BBC series Waiting for the Whistle, which aired on BBC Choice. For the series he directed the TV film The King and Us, which was written by Peter Bowker and starred Christopher Eccleston, Siobhan Finneran and Eddie Large.The film covered the story of Denis Law's goal that relegated Manchester United from the First Division in 1974.

Shortly after working on The King and Us, Wax left the BBC to join Granada television as a producer, while also working with Red Production Company in Manchester. In 2001, he worked on a collaborative project for Red Productions and BBC Serials, which aired on BBC2. The single film, Flesh and Blood, was written by Peter Bowker, directed by Julian Farino and starred Christopher Eccleston. It received a number of awards including a BAFTA nomination for Best Single Drama. Within the 12 months of its release, it won the Prix Europa for European Fiction Film of the year. Domestically, it also received Royal Television Society awards, with Best Writer and Best Actor awards going to Peter Bowker and Christopher Eccleston respectively.

In 2002, Wax produced Sally Wainwright's three-part mini-series Sparkhouse for Red Productions and BBC One. While at Granada, he worked as a script executive on Hornblower and also Poirot. The third season of Hornblower also received an Emmy nomination.

Wax developed and produced for Granada the 2004 Channel 4 and CBC mini-series, Sex Traffic. The two-part thriller, written by Abi Morgan, directed by David Yates and starring Anamaria Marinca and John Simm, told the story of two girls trafficked from Romania to Britain and explored both the social and political aspects of trafficking. The show won the 2005 BAFTA award for Best Drama Serial, and won eight of the 15 BAFTA production awards on offer. It also won four RTS Awards.

He joined the British production company Kudos in 2005. His first role as executive producer was on the mini-series Tsunami: The Aftermath. The show starred Tim Roth, Chiwetel Ejiofor and Toni Collette, and was directed by Bharat Nalluri. It aired on both the BBC and HBO.

Wax was the executive producer on the single drama West 10 LDN, written by Noel Clarke and directed by Menhaj Huda for BBC Three in 2008. He also worked as executive producer on the Channel 4 sitcom Plus One, in 2009, starring Daniel Mays, Nigel Harman, Ingrid Oliver and Steve John Shepherd.

Also broadcast on BBC One in 2009, Wax executive produced the three-part drama series, Occupation, working with writer Peter Bowker. The drama traced the fraught interwoven journeys of three British soldiers who take part in the invasion of Iraq and then return to Manchester, before being drawn back to Basra. The drama featured James Nesbitt, Stephen Graham and Warren Brown, and was directed by Nick Murphy. A year later, Occupation won the 2010 BAFTA award for Best Drama Serial, a Prix Europa award for Best European Series and a Broadcasting Press Guild Award for Best Serial.

Later in 2010, Wax executive produced two seasons of the Harriet Braun created, Glasgow-based TV show, Lip Service, which aired on BBC Three. Starring Fiona Button, Heather Peace, Ruta Gedmintas, Emun Elliott, Natasha O'Keefe, Laura Fraser and Neve Mackintosh.

In 2011, Wax executive produced the Abi Morgan written drama series, The Hour, set in a BBC newsroom during the 1956 Suez crisis. Starring Romola Garai, Dominic West, Ben Whishaw, Anna Chancellor, Oona Chaplin and Peter Capaldi. It was broadcast on BBC2 and BBC America. It was commissioned for a second series but cancelled after the second series was transmitted. The Hour was also nominated for Best Mini-Series at the 70th Golden Globe Awards. Abi Morgan later won the Primetime Emmy Award for Outstanding Writing in a Mini-Series.

Wax teamed up with Peter Bowker in 2014 for the three-part mini-series about the IRA bombing in Manchester, which was titled From There to Here. The drama starred Philip Glenister, Morven Christie, Bernard Hill, Steven Mackintosh, Saskia Reeves, Liz White and Daniel Rigby.

Shortly after, Wax worked as executive producer for the Channel 4 and AMC sci-fi series Humans. The first series of the show, written by Sam Vincent and Jonathan Brackley and set in a parallel present, explored the impact of a suburban family who buy a humanoid robot. The show quickly received acclaim in both the United States and Britain, with The Guardian calling the show the "biggest drama hit in 20 years" for Channel 4. Due to the show's popularity, it was renewed for a second season.

In 2015, he was announced as the executive producer on the drama Capital. It was based on John Lanchester's novel of the same name. The three-part serial was adapted by Peter Bowker for BBC One, was directed by Euros Lyn, and aired in November 2015. It starred Toby Jones, Rachel Stirling, Adeel Akhtar, Lesley Sharp, Wunmi Mosaku, and Gemma Jones. The drama won the International Emmy Award for Best Mini-Series in November 2016.

In early 2017, Wax left Kudos to set up the independent production company Wild Mercury under Banijay Group.

Wax continued in his executive producer role on Kudos' eight-part second series of Humans which aired to critical acclaim on Channel 4 in October 2016. Humans was recommissioned for a third season in 2017, and aired in June 2018 as a co-production between Kudos and Wild Mercury Productions.

Wild Mercury Productions

Wax's first production for Wild Mercury was Troy: Fall of a City for BBC One and Netflix, David Farr's retelling of the Trojan War, produced in association with Kudos. Starring Bella Dayne, Louis Hunter, David Threlfall, David Gyasi, Jonas Armstrong, Lex King, Tom Weston-Jones, Frances O’Connor, Chloe Pirrie, and Joseph Mawle. The show won the 2019 BAFTA Craft award for Best Special, Visual & Graphic Effects.

In 2020 Wax was announced as executive producer of The Rig, a six-part original supernatural thriller series for Amazon Prime Video, set on an oil rig in the North Sea. Written by David Macpherson, directed by John Strickland, the series was filmed in 2021. Cast included Iain Glen, Emily Hampshire, Martin Compston, Owen Teale, Mark Bonnar, Rochenda Sandall, Mark Addy, Calvin Dembar, Molly Vevers, Richard Pepple, Abraham Popoola, Stuart McQuarrie and Emun Elliott.

In February 2023 it was announced that The Rig will be returning for a second series.

In 2022 Wax also executive produced The Sixth Commandment, a four-part true crime drama for BBC One, written by Sarah Phelps, directed by Saul Dibb, starring Timothy Spall, Éanna Hardwicke, Anne Reid, Annabel Scholey, Ben Bailey Smith, Sheila Hancock, Connor MacNeil, Amanda Root and Adrian Rawlins. The series filmed in 2023 and in 2024 won the BAFTA and RTS Awards for Best Limited Series, as well as awards for writer and cast. In 2024 Wax was announced as executive producer of Fear on Amazon Prime Video, the series was written by Mick Ford and directed by Justin Chadwick, and starred Martin Compston and Anjli Mohindra. It aired in March 2025.

The Rig season 2 aired on Amazon in January 2025.

== Credits ==
- The Ice House - Script Editor (1997)
- Aristocrats - Script Writer (1999)
- Waiting for the Whistle - Producer (2001)
- The King and Us - Producer (2002)
- Sparkhouse - Producer (2002)
- Flesh and Blood - Producer (2002)
- Sex Traffic - Producer (2004)
- Tsunami: The Aftermath - Executive Producer (2005)
- West 10 LDN - Executive Producer (2009)
- Plus One – Executive Producer (2009)
- Occupation - Executive Producer (2009)
- Lip Service - Executive Producer (2010–2012)
- The Hour - Executive Producer (2012–2013)
- From There to Here - Executive Producer (2014)
- Humans - Executive Producer (2015–2018)
- Capital - Executive Producer (2015)
- Troy: Fall of a City - Executive Producer (2018)
- The Rig - Executive Producer (2023)
- The Sixth Commandment - Executive Producer (2023)
- The Rig (2) - Executive Producer (2025)
- Fear - Executive Producer (2025)
