= Kenny Wax =

British theatrical producer

Kenny Wax MBE (born 23 June 1967) is a British theatrical producer of musicals, plays, concerts and family entertainment.

== Early life and education ==
He was born in Bowdon, Cheshire, the third child of parents Robert and Valerie Wax. His brother Derek Wax is a multi BAFTA and Emmy winning television producer whose award-winning programmes include Sex Traffic, The Hour, Occupation and Humans.

Kenny was educated at Altrincham Preparatory School, in Cheshire and Carmel College, Oxfordshire. He graduated from the Polytechnic of Central London with a 2(1) in Business Studies.

== Career ==
Wax began his theatre career as an usher at the Theatre Royal Drury Lane on the 1989 production of Miss Saigon. He left there to work for Dewynters as a 'runner' before being offered full time employment in the media department of the theatre advertising agency. He left there to be a runner for Cameron Mackintosh on the Stiles and Drewe musical Just So at the Tricycle Theatre. He was production administrator at the King's Head Theatre in Islington. There he made his debut as a producer with a season of Sunday Night Concerts, under the banner Kickin' The Clouds Away. He worked for a season as general manager of the National Youth Theatre.

Wax spent three years at Imagination Entertainment before starting his own company in 1995. He was general manager for PW Productions of The Woman In Black and An Inspector Calls. Wax has produced both plays and musicals in London's West End. He has also produced family entertainment products such as Stiles and Drewe's The Three Little Pigs at the Palace Theatre, and with Tall Stories The Gruffalo, The Gruffalo's Child, and Room on the Broom.

Wax's production of The Play That Goes Wrong transferred to Broadway, opening in March 2017. It had completed a 7-month, UK-wide tour in 2012.

== International work ==
Top Hat has been seen twice in Japan and in Sweden performed by the Malmö Opera. Hetty Feather has played at the Asolo Theatre in Sarasota, and Mr Popper's Penguins at the New Victory Theatre in New York City. The Tiger Who Came To Tea, We're Going On A Bear Hunt, and The Three Little Pigs have all played at the Melbourne Arts Centre and the Sydney Opera House. A film version of We're Going On A Bear Hunt was shown on Channel 4 Christmas 2016.

== Awards and appointments ==
Wax's production of The Play That Goes Wrong was winner of the Laurence Olivier Award for Best New Comedy, and the Tony Award for Best Scenic Design in a Play. His production of Top Hat won three Laurence Olivier Awards and an Evening Standard Theatre Award for 'Best Night Out'.

His production of Once on This Island won Best New Musical at the 1995 Laurence Olivier Awards. His productions of Hetty Feather, Room on the Broom, and The Tiger Who Came To Tea have also received nominations for the Laurence Olivier Award for Best Entertainment. His production of Wonderful Town won the Manchester Evening News Award for Best Production 2014.

Wax was appointed president of the Society of London Theatre in June 2017. He listed 16th in The Stage 100, the industry newspaper's list reflecting the 100 most influential people working in the theatre and performing arts industry, and was also shortlisted by The Stage as Producer of the Year. He is on the board of the League of Independent Producers.
