= Troy: Fall of a City =

2018 British-American historical drama

- Genre: Drama; Historical fiction Fantasy
- Created by: David Farr
- Written by: David Farr; Nancy Harris; Mika Watkins; Joe Barton
- Directed by: Owen Harris; Mark Brozel
- Starring: Louis Hunter; Aimee-Ffion Edwards; Bella Dayne; David Threlfall; Frances O'Connor; Tom Weston-Jones; Joseph Mawle; Chloe Pirrie; Johnny Harris; David Gyasi; Jonas Armstrong; Alfred Enoch; Hakeem Kae-Kazim
- Composer: Robin Coudert
- Countries of origin: United Kingdom; United States
- Original language: English
- No. of series: 1
- No. of episodes: 8

Production
- Executive producers: Derek Wax; David Farr
- Producer: Barney Reisz
- Production location: South Africa
- Running time: 56 minutes
- Production companies: Kudos; Wild Mercury; Netflix

Original release
- Network: BBC One (UK); Netflix (international)
- Release: 17 February – 7 April 2018

Troy: Fall of a City is an eight-part television historical drama based on the Trojan War and the love affair between Paris and Helen. The show tells the story of the 10-year siege of Troy, set in the 13th century BC. It is not an adaptation of Homer's Iliad or Odyssey, but rather an original take on the Greek myths, and covers some ground only alluded to in those works. The series was commissioned by BBC One and is a co-production between BBC One and Netflix, with BBC One airing the show on 17 February 2018 in the United Kingdom, and Netflix streaming the show internationally outside the UK.

== Premise ==
The story of the 10-year siege of Troy by the Greeks is told after Paris, the young prince of Troy, and Helen of Sparta, wife of the Greek king Menelaus, fall in love and leave Sparta together for Troy.

== Cast ==
- Louis Hunter as Paris/Alexander (Note: Attributed to multiple references:)
- Bella Dayne as Helen of Troy (Note: Attributed to multiple references:)
- David Threlfall as Priam (Note: Attributed to multiple references:)
- Frances O'Connor as Hecuba
- Tom Weston-Jones as Hector
- Joseph Mawle as Odysseus (Note: Attributed to multiple references:)
- Chloe Pirrie as Andromache
- Johnny Harris as Agamemnon (Note: Attributed to multiple references:)
- David Gyasi as Achilles (Note: Attributed to multiple references:)
- Jonas Armstrong as Menelaus (Note: Attributed to multiple references:)
- Alfred Enoch as Aeneas
- Aimee-Ffion Edwards as Cassandra
- Hakeem Kae-Kazim as Zeus (Note: Attributed to multiple references:)
- Chris Fisher as Deiphobus
- Christiaan Schoombie as Troilus
- Alex Lanipekun as Pandarus
- Jonathan Pienaar as Litos
- David Avery as Xanthius
- Lex King as Aphrodite
- Amy Louise Wilson as Briseis
- Inge Beckmann as Hera
- Shamilla Miller as Athena
- Diarmaid Murtagh as Hermes
- Thando Bulane-Hopa as Artemis
- Nina Milner as Penthesilea
- Grace Hogg-Robinson as Hermione
- Jovan Muthray as Kaidas
- Lemogang Tsipa as Patroklus
- Erica Wessels as Penelope

== Production ==
The series was filmed near Cape Town and consists of eight episodes. It was written by David Farr, Nancy Harris, Mika Watkins, and Joe Barton, and directed by Owen Harris and Mark Brozel.

== Episodes ==
No. in series	Title	Directed by	Written by	Original release date	UK viewers (millions)
1	"Black Blood"	Owen Harris	David Farr	17 February 2018	3.2 Million
Zeus has picked Paris to serve as a judge of a beauty pageant of three Greek goddesses: Hera, Athena, and Aphrodite. Paris awards the Apple of Discord to Aphrodite. In Troy, Priam who has over 50 sons, recognizes Paris as another one of his sons. Priam dispatches Pandarus and Paris as royal envoys on a diplomatic mission to Sparta. Priam's plan is to arrange the marriage of Paris to Hermione. Paris returns instead with Helen, the unhappily married wife of the Spartan leader Menelaus.
2	"Conditions"	Owen Harris	David Farr	24 February 2018	N/A
Odysseus tries to feign madness in order to avoid getting drafted for the Trojan War, but Diomedes knows how cunning his old friend is and decides to test the former’s sanity by kidnapping the infant daughter of Odysseus and Penelope and placing the baby in front of Odysseus while he plows a field with cattle. Just as Penelope shields their baby, Odysseus manages to stop the plow at the last moment before punching Diomedes for threatening his daughter. Before going off to Troy, Odysseus entrusts Telemachus as the new man of the house and implores him to look after his mother and sister in his absence. Later on, The Mycenaean League headed by Agamemnon hope to win the favor of the gods. They sacrifice a white dove to the goddess Artemis; to their dismay, Artemis rejects their sacrifice and demands the life of Agamemnon’s oldest daughter, Iphigenia. The two sides parley in Troy; Agamemnon demands the customs authority over the Strait of Dardanelles in addition to the return of Helen to her husband Menelaus. Aeneas, the mythological founder of Rome, joins the Trojan side.
3	"Siege"	Owen Harris	Nancy Harris	3 March 2018	N/A
With food supplies running low in besieged Troy, Paris and Hector journey secretly to Cilia to obtain more from Eetion, Hector's father-in-law.
4	"Spoils of War"	Mark Brozel	Mika Watkins	10 March 2018	1.6 Million
With his Myrmidons, Achilles sacks the Trojan-allied city of Lyrnessus; next, he enslaves Briseis. Agamemnon rapes Chryseis. Menelaus defeats Paris in a duel, and Paris flees to the hills.
5	"Hunted"	Mark Brozel	David Farr	17 March 2018	N/A
Paris, now a disgraced fugitive, pays a visit to his former lover Oenone, but he is not welcome. He blames his plight on the goddess Aphrodite.
6	"Battle on the Beach"	Mark Brozel	Joe Barton	24 March 2018	N/A
In the hills, Paris finds himself with the Amazon Queen Penthesilea. Patroclus tries to convince Achilles to re-join the war. Afterwards, Hector kills Patroclus. Hector's wife Andromache gives birth to Astyanax, their son.
7	"Twelve Days"	John Strickland	David Farr	31 March 2018	N/A
Under the direction of the wily Odysseus, Thersites tricks Achilles into thinking that the Trojans have broken their mourning truce, and Achilles re-joins the war. Paris shoots an arrow into Achilles' heel.
8	"Offering"	John Strickland	David Farr	7 April 2018	N/A
The western Greek alliance at last gains entry to Troy, employing the ruse devised by Odysseus-the Trojan Horse and sack the city. After Helen's betrayal, Menelaus kills Paris. Aeneas (the subject of Virgil's Aeneid) is one of the few male survivors amongst the Trojans. Helen is taken back to Sparta by Menelaus, and Andromache is seized as a war trophy following the death of her baby son Astyanax by Odysseus under the orders of Agamemnon, who had threatened to execute Penelope and their children should he continue to protest. A guilt-ridden Aphrodite, Hera, and Athena eventually come upon the room where Paris was murdered in and mourn over everything that has transpired.

== Changes from earlier adaptations ==
The show makes a number of alterations from the original Greek texts, as well as departures from earlier modern adaptations of the legend. For instance, it vilifies Menelaus, proposes a resolution to Briseis' captivity, and omits Aeneas' identity as the son of Aphrodite. The show also omits the final reconciliation between Achilles and Agamemnon from the Iliad, instead replacing this with Agamemnon resorting to "ignoble trickery". It also reimagines the circumstances of the Trojan Horse stratagem by making it filled with grain for the starving city, thus making the Trojans more likely to bring it in. More significantly, it also incorporates myths about the lead-up to the war and about the backgrounds of the major characters that are not found in the Iliad and are not normally included in most modern adaptations.

One of the show's most radical changes from earlier adaptations was its decision to include the Greek gods as human-like characters played by live actors who speak normal dialogue. While the gods are major figures in the original Homeric epics, ever since the mid-twentieth century, adaptations of the Trojan War have nearly always either removed the gods from the story or heavily reduced their role in it. Most twenty-first-century adaptations of the Trojan War, including the film Troy (2004), Alessandro Baricco's Iliad (2004), Margaret George's Helen of Troy (2006), and Alice Oswald's Memorial (2011) omit them entirely. The gods play an active role in the show for the first half of the series, but they recede into the background halfway through after Zeus orders them to stop intervening in the war. Zeus does give this command in the original Iliad, but it is almost immediately violated and eventually repealed entirely.

The most controversial change was the showrunners' decision to cast David Gyasi, a black actor of Ghanaian descent, as Achilles, and Nigerian-born Hakeem Kae-Kazim, another black actor, as Zeus. These decisions resulted in almost immediate backlash as both roles are traditionally portrayed by white actors and historically depicted as white.

== Reception ==
=== Ratings ===
The show's ratings were a disappointment to its creators. Despite its Saturday night prime time slot and each episode's £2 million budget, the first episode aired to an audience of only 3.2 million viewers, while other shows in the same time slot have easily surpassed 5 million. By episode four, the viewership had dropped to only 1.6 million.

=== Critical reception ===
On review aggregator website Rotten Tomatoes, the series holds a critics' approval rating of 68% based on 25 critic reviews, and an average rating of 6/10. The critics' consensus reads: "Troy: Fall of a City never tries to reinvent the bronze wheel, but succeeds in engaging audiences with both royal and divine intrigue, making for a highly enjoyable romp in the lost kingdom."

In a 16 February 2018 review for The Independent, Jacob Stolworthy praised the series for its willingness to alter the myths, as well as Louis Hunter's acting in his lead role as Paris. He also praised the show's elaborate costuming, "its lavish set design, production values and sci-fi soundtrack", commenting, "Viewers are immediately transported to ancient locations (in actuality beautiful Cape Town) in scene one and never relents. If it's escapism you're wanting, series link away." He criticized the first episode; however, for seeming "too tame" in light of the numerous early comparisons to HBO's Game of Thrones.

In an 18 February review for The Guardian, Euan Ferguson praised the show for its faithfulness to the original myths and for its strong portrayal of Helen, which he stated stood in stark contrast to the demure portrayal of the character by Diane Kruger in the 2004 Hollywood blockbuster film Troy, which had starred Brad Pitt as Achilles. Ferguson compared Troy: Fall of a City favourably to Game of Thrones and commented that the show will "hopefully expunge any residual memories of the 2004 Brad Pitt epic". He comments, "...older viewers can marvel at the silked lushness of the sea scenes while revelling in an old tale well told, younger ones can learn a little, about the names of the gods, and the fire-haunted dreams of Cassandra, and about mankind’s ancient rush towards betrayal."

A review from the same day by Rupert Hawksley for The Daily Telegraph tentatively praised Troy: Fall of a City for its more thoughtful, psychologically complicated interpretation of the Trojan War in sharp contrast to the 2004 film Troy, which Hawksley derided as a "shallow flex-fest". Nonetheless, Hawksley criticized the characters' occasionally stilted dialogue. He concluded, "Troy: Fall of a City might just be a fresh, psychologically knotty take on one of the greatest tales of them all." Also on the same day, Camilla Long, reviewing for The Sunday Times, panned the show, writing, "Troy: Fall of a City, a reworking of the oldest drive-by in history, is so far removed from anything Sophocles might recognize, they should have named it The Real Housewives of Ilium."

In a 24 February review for The Spectator, James Walton dismissed the script as "pitched somewhere between a particularly corny Hollywood epic and a play by Ernie Wise", while the dialogue was pronounced "staggeringly creaky and endlessly bathetic". Walton goes on: "'How did you two get together?'. Paris asked Helen and Menelaus at the banquet given in his honour. ... Impressively, the dialogue even managed to descend into cliché when nobody was actually using any words — as in the scene where the two defeated goddesses from the beauty contest went for one of those anguished bellows that causes all the nearby birds to fly theatrically from the trees."

A review from 28 February by Rachel Cooke for New Statesman panned the show, complaining that "all the men look as if they're in a Calvin Klein ad", that the dialogue is unrealistic, and that its portrayal of Helen and Paris's relationship is "tediously 21st century". Cooke concludes: "The dialogue is so richly silted with self-help banalities, we might as well be watching a Meghan and Harry biopic as a drama inspired by the greatest of all epic poems. There's also something exceedingly creepy about its retro, soft-porny direction (by Owen Harris); every time Helen takes a shower, you half expect her to whip out a Flake."

In an 8 April review for IndieWire, Steve Greene criticized the show for telling the same story that has been told thousands of times before and offering very little innovation. He concludes: "The result is a series more competent than compelling. The tiny diversions from the norm seem thrilling by comparison." He offered extended praise for Gyasi's performance as Achilles and Mawle's performance as Odysseus, and for the show's creators' unusual decision to include the gods in the show.

In an unreservedly positive review for Buffalo News on 26 May 2018, Randy Schiff praised the show for its pace and acting, commenting specifically on Hunter, Dayne, Gyasi, Mawle, O'Connor, and Threlfall's performances. He also lauded the portrayal of Helen as a "stately and intelligent" woman whose "deep desire for independence" is only satisfied once she goes to Troy, where women are valued just as much as men. He also expressed wonderment at the show's portrayal of the Greek deities, writing, "I found myself especially mesmerized by the show's eerie presentation of deities: here, spectacularly partisan goddesses strut across raging battlefields, while a world-weary Zeus (Hakeem Kae-Kazim) remains resolutely neutral amidst the chaos."

Andrea Tallarita defended the show in a 28 June 2018 review for PopMatters, arguing that the show's commercial failure may have been partially a result of the viewing audience's ignorance of the original classical texts, which the show treated with surprising fidelity. Tallarita generally praised the show, stating that it has "a dignified life of [its] own", but criticized the decision to make the gods less involved for the second half of the series, as well as the fact that the show limited itself to only include a small number of especially important deities rather than the vast pantheon appearing in the Iliad, calling this decision "such a wasted opportunity".
