= River (TV series) =

British television drama series

- River title card
- Genre: Crime drama
- Created by: Abi Morgan
- Written by: Abi Morgan
- Starring: Stellan Skarsgård; Nicola Walker; Adeel Akhtar
- Composer: Harry Escott
- Country of origin: United Kingdom
- Original language: English
- No. of series: 1
- No. of episodes: 6

Production
- Executive producers: Jane Featherstone; Manda Levin; Abi Morgan; Lucy Richer
- Producer: Chris Carey
- Running time: 54–58 minutes
- Production company: Kudos

Original release
- Network: BBC One
- Release: 13 October – 17 November 2015

River is a six-part British television drama series, created and written by Abi Morgan and starring Stellan Skarsgård and Nicola Walker. It premiered on BBC One on 13 October 2015 and internationally on Netflix on 18 November 2015. The series is a police procedural. Detective Inspector John River is suffering from guilt over a recent loss.

== Cast ==
- Stellan Skarsgård – DI John River, Metropolitan Police Service
- Nicola Walker – the late DS Jackie "Stevie" Stevenson
- Adeel Akhtar – DS Ira King
- Lesley Manville – DCI Chrissie Read
- Georgina Rich – Rosa Fallows, police psychologist
- Eddie Marsan – Thomas Neill Cream, the Lambeth Poisoner
- Turlough Convery – Frankie Stevenson
- Sorcha Cusack – Bridie Stevenson
- Steve Nicolson – Jimmy Stevenson
- Owen Teale – PSupt Marcus McDonald
- Michael Maloney – Tom Read
- Jim Norton – Michael Bennigan
- Peter Bankolé – Haider Jamal Abdi
- Adjoa Andoh – Sunday Akentola
- Shannon Tarbet – Erin Fielding
- Josef Altin – Christopher Riley
- Anamaria Marinca – Ema
- Andrei Zayats – Ukrainian Lad
- Lydia Leonard – Marianne King
- Pippa Bennett-Warner – Tia Edwards
- Franz Drameh – Bruno
- Stefan Kalipha – Omari Tadros

== Production ==
The series was commissioned by Charlotte Moore and Ben Stephenson. The executive producers are Jane Featherstone, Manda Levin, Abi Morgan and Lucy Richer. Filming began in London in October 2014. The series was made by Kudos and will be distributed globally by Shine International.

Vicki Power of the Daily Express reported Skarsgård saying of his role as DI River, "There's not much research you can do because his condition doesn't really exist as we know it. It's a combination of problems, because he's not like people who hear voices – they're usually schizophrenic and lack empathy and he does not. But it doesn't make it less truthful. What attracted me to the script is that it didn't look like any other script I've ever read." Power added, "The series is the brainchild of Emmy-winner Abi Morgan, who wrote The Hour and The Iron Lady. Abi freely admits she nicked the idea from the late Anthony Minghella, who directed the 1990 fantasy film Truly, Madly, Deeply, in which a grieving woman's (Juliet Stevenson) dead boyfriend appears to come back to life".

Describing how she addressed the subject of living with voices in your head, as River does, Morgan told the BBC, "I know from myself, I talk out loud. I've got children and they say to me 'mummy, you talk to yourself all the time'. I realised how much I do have other people in my head and what a comfort they are to me. It's not just about those who experience voices through mental health, it's the voices we carry from our past, our future or experiences, that we manifest and I hope that's something that an audience will identify with".

Talking about recording the scenes involving manifests, Skarsgård said: "How we practically do it is we usually shoot the scene first with the actor who plays the manifest and then we shoot the same scene exactly the same way but without anybody there. It looks fantastic, because you walk around, you gesture and talk to somebody that isn't there and it's quite interesting visually. To me, I'm the kind of actor who doesn't want to act towards a mark beside the camera; I want the real actor to be there, and I feed so much off the other actors. So it's very unnatural to me to do it, but since we always do the scene with the actor first I have a very clear memory and then we do it with the real actor saying the lines, so I still get a response and it becomes more like playing a game of ping pong".

The series used the song "I Love to Love (But My Baby Loves to Dance)" at the start and end of the first episode and at the end of the last episode.

== Locations ==
Filming took place across at least eight London Boroughs - Lambeth, Islington, Camden, Hackney, Southwark, Redbridge, Newham, Tower Hamlets and Lewisham.

Notable roads, buildings and landmarks include Clerkenwell Road in Islington, Southwark Park, Globe Theatre and Millennium Bridge in Southwark, and Stratford International in Newham.

== Episodes ==
No.	Title	Directed by	Written by	Original release date	UK viewers (millions)
1	"Episode 1"	Richard Laxton	Abi Morgan	13 October 2015	3.88
Detective Inspector John River is haunted by visions of his recently murdered colleague, Detective Sergeant Jackie 'Stevie' Stevenson, and of the Victorian poisoner Thomas Neill Cream, and others, who all talk to him. He continues trying to find Stevie's killer although excluded from the case due to his proximity to the events surrounding it. River is required to undergo psychiatric evaluation, which his commanding officer expects him to fail. Meanwhile, River pursues a potential suspect who falls to his death, and he is subsequently placed under increasing pressure from the media. Simultaneously, he faces demands from the mother of a missing teenager to find her daughter’s body.
2	"Episode 2"	Richard Laxton	Abi Morgan	20 October 2015	2.67
At Stevie's wake, River has to deal with her brother Jimmy and other family members. Stevie had been estranged from them for many years because she had given crucial evidence in court against Jimmy, which resulted in a lengthy prison sentence for murder. Her subsequent decision to become a policewoman had further deepened the rift with her family. River is assaulted by the pregnant girlfriend of the man he had chased to his death. River has begun to doubt the man's guilt. Stevie had a second mobile phone. DNA evidence showed that she had previously been a passenger in the car driven by her killer. River and the pregnant woman begin to trust each other, and he examines the history of the killer's car.
3	"Episode 3"	Tim Fywell	Abi Morgan	27 October 2015	N/A
River clashes with his new partner Ira, who wants to disclose the discovery of Stevie's second mobile phone to their superiors. River agrees to do so, but makes it clear that he wants to personally pursue the leads the phone has provided first. Simultaneously, he and Ira investigate the serious injury of a construction site's foreman in a suspicious workplace accident. To his surprise, River finds that the psychiatric report commissioned by his commanding officers following Stevie's death has concluded that he is fit to continue working.
4	"Episode 4"	Tim Fywell	Abi Morgan	3 November 2015	N/A
River investigates Stevie's relationship with a worker at a kebab shop and has concerns about his perception of her private life. He and Ira spend an evening working at Read's home. River makes a surprising discovery—one of the people Stevie called from her second mobile phone on the night of her death was Read's husband. River attends a group run by his psychologist, for people who hear voices.
5	"Episode 5"	Jessica Hobbs	Abi Morgan	10 November 2015	N/A
River and Ira investigate the murder of kebab shop worker Haider Jamal Abdi in a public library. They focus on both a cleaner, who was captured on CCTV but who does not appear on the books of the library's cleaning contractor, as well as on the lawyer who represented Haider at an immigration tribunal. Their findings lead them to a possible understanding of what Stevie herself may have been investigating and which might have led to her death.
6	"Episode 6"	Jessica Hobbs	Abi Morgan	17 November 2015	N/A
River and Ira continue to follow the leads resulting from Stevie's earlier personal investigations. She had been examining both how undocumented immigrants were able to easily obtain official immigration status and how they were then exploited by particular businesses. They find a connection between these companies, as well as evidence of corruption, but River also uncovers major secrets concerning Stevie's private life. He resolves to find her killer, despite knowing that in doing so he will lose her forever.

== Critical reception ==
After the first episode, Sam Wollaston wrote in The Guardian: "It's more than just crime drama – it's about personal tragedy, demons; it's a study of loss and grief (which it shares with the greatest Nordic noir of them all: the first series of The Killing). It's also a study of that – killing – and why people do it. And why they did it – Mr Cream brings a historical perspective to it. And Abi Morgan, the creator of the series, brings a characteristic humanness to it all; it's as much about who the people are as about what they do to each other. Good enough for me."

The first episode also impressed the Daily Telegraph's Tim Martin, who gave it a full five stars in his review and called it "superlatively creepy TV" and "a dense and thoughtful police procedural". Martin found that: "Much of the credit also belongs to Skarsgård […] His performance here was a revelation, switching in seconds from remoteness to fury, from twinkling avuncularity to withering scorn – and the emotional punch at the end of this episode, when River finally admitted the extent of his psychological distress, was the most moving thing I've seen on television for some time. Then he went home to find a dead man sitting on his bed. Personally, I can't wait for next week."

Daisy Wyatt, in The Independent, found the series "well-written and shot beautifully, but the criminal investigation is not the crux of the drama. River's mind becomes the crime scene as he struggles with psychotic hallucinations – or 'manifests' as he calls them – of past victims, namely colleague Detective Jackie 'Stevie' Stevenson, played by Walker."

Reviewing Episode Two for The Daily Telegraph, Gerard O'Donovan gave it 4 out of 5 stars, writing: "Two episodes in, River (BBC Two) is proving a most intriguing piece of television. It takes the shape – and tropes – of a standard police drama yet appears to be expanding, flowing even, into something quite different" and called Skarsgård "extraordinarily expressive." O'Donovan concluded that, "River – so far at least […] offers a richer emotional landscape than most crime drama on TV."

The final episode earned a five-star review from The Daily Telegraph's Michael Hogan, who noted, "Skarsgård delivered a powerhouse performance: sad and soulful in one scene, sardonically spiky and manically energetic in the next." Hogan praised the production, writing: "This series was beautifully written by Abi Morgan, stylishly directed, and most of all, superbly acted." He concluded by saying, "I'm torn between wanting River to get recommissioned […] and wanting this series to stand alone as six near-perfect episodes. Creepy yet ultimately uplifting, River stands alongside London Spy, Humans and Wolf Hall as one of the year's best home-grown TV dramas."

For her role as DCI Chrissie Read, Lesley Manville earned a nomination for the 2016 BAFTA TV Award for Best Supporting Actress.

== See also ==
- Raines
