= Kudos (production company) =

British independent film and television production company

- Formerly: Kudos Film and Television (1992-2013)
- Type: Subsidiary
- Industry: Television; Film
- Founded: 1992; 34 years ago
- Founder: Stephen Garrett
- Headquarters: 12–14 Amwell Street, London, United Kingdom
- Key people: Martin Haines and Karen Wilson (Joint Managing Directors)
- Products: Broadcasting; Merchandise
- Parent: Shine Group (2007–2015); Banijay UK Productions (2015–present)
- Divisions: Kudos North
- Subsidiaries: Kudos Knight; What's The Story Sounds
- Website: www.kudos.co.uk

Kudos is a British film and television production company owned by Banijay UK Productions. It has produced television series for the BBC, ITV, Channel 4, Sky, Amazon and Netflix and its productions include Tin Star, Humans, Broadchurch, The Tunnel, Grantchester, Apple Tree Yard, Utopia, Spooks (US: MI5), Hustle and Life on Mars/Ashes to Ashes. In 2007, it was voted Best Independent Production Company by Broadcast magazine. Formed in 1992, since 2007 it has been part of the Shine Group. In 2007, it also set up the film unit, Kudos Pictures. In 2011, the Shine Group was 100% acquired by News Corporation and was part of the 50–50 joint-venture Endemol Shine Group in 2015. On 3 July 2020, France-based Banijay bought the studio through it's acquisition of the Endemol Shine Group.

== History ==
The company was formed in 1992. It came to international attention with the BAFTA Award-winning spy drama Spooks, which debuted on BBC One on 13 May 2002.

In late 2006, the company was sold to Shine Limited for around £35m. Shine also bought Princess Productions and Dragonfly Film and Television Productions to create the Shine Group, although all four divisions retained their individual identity.

With three British films already in production, and ten in development, in June 2007 the company announced plans to set up a film unit, with Miss Pettigrew Lives for a Day (2008) expected to be its first release. It planned to mix and match actors, writers and directors between the units, and already had Hollywood deals for film remakes of Hustle, Spooks and Tsunami: The Aftermath.

In 2015, it was included in a 50–50% joint venture between 21st Century Fox and Apollo Global Management's Endemol and CORE Media Group, as Endemol Shine Group.

In November 2015, Endemol Shine Group announced that their two labels Shine Pictures and Lovely Day would officially become part of Endemol Shine UK's Kudos label by absorbing the two labels together as part of their restructure.

== Productions ==
=== Television ===
==== Current ====
- Grantchester for ITV1.
- SAS: Rogue Heroes for BBC One & MGM+.

==== Past ====
- This Town for BBC One.
- Then You Run 2023 series for Sky Max.
- The Tunnel. Three series (2013, 2016 and 2017) for Sky Atlantic and Canal+ – total 28 episodes, remake of the Swedish/Danish crime thriller The Bridge with a third series in development.
- Tin Star for Sky Atlantic & Amazon – total 10 episodes. Crime drama set in a mountain town overrun by migrant oil workers, starring Tim Roth.
- Broadchurch: three series (from 2013) for ITV – total 24 episodes. Series that explores what happens when the residents of a coastal town become the centre of a police investigation and media frenzy when a child's body is discovered. the series stars David Tennant and is written & created by Chris Chibnall.
- Humans: three series for Channel 4 & AMC. An adaptation of the Swedish sci-fi drama Real Humans. Set in a parallel present day where technology has enabled robots to become so human it is nearly impossible to tell them apart from people. A co-production with original makers Matador Films and AMC. Created by two of the writers and producers of the Swedish Wallander series.
- Code 404 (2020 - 2022) Sky One/Sky Comedy series starring Stephen Graham.
- Utopia (2020) for Prime Video – 8 episodes.
- Two Weeks to Live (2020) for Sky One.
- Deadwater Fell (2020) for Channel 4.
- Responsible Child (2019) for BBC Two.
- Deep Water (2019)
- The Boy with the Topknot (2017) for BBC Two – 1 episode.
- Man in an Orange Shirt (2017) for BBC Two – 2 episodes.
- Gunpowder (2017) for BBC One – 3 episodes. Written by Ronan Bennett and starring Kit Harington.
- Apple Tree Yard (2017) for BBC One – 4 episodes. Written by Amanda Coe and based on the novel by Louise Doughty. Starring Emily Watson.
- Flowers (2016) for Channel 4 – 6 episodes. Written by Will Sharpe and starring Olivia Colman and Julian Barratt. Second series currently in production.
- River: a drama for BBC One centering on policeman John River, written by Abi Morgan
- Capital: An adaption of the John Lanchester novel for BBC One
- Death in Paradise: four series (from 2011) for BBC One and France Télévisions – total 32 episodes with a fifth series commissioned for 2016.
- The Smoke one series (2014) for Sky1 – total 8 episodes.
- Vicious, two series, a Christmas special, and a Finale special (2013–2016) for ITV – total 14 episodes.
- Utopia: two series (from 2013) for Channel 4 – total 12 episodes.
- Law & Order: UK: eight series (2009–2014) for ITV – total 53 episodes.
- From There to Here one series (2014) for BBC One – total 3 episodes.
- M.I. High: seven series (2007–2011, 2013–2014) for CBBC – total 88 episodes.
- Hunted: one series (2013) for BBC One and Cinemax – total 8 episodes.
- Mayday: mini-series (2013) for BBC One – total 5 episodes.
- Lip Service: two series (2010–2012) for BBC Three – total 12 episodes.
- The Hour: two series (2011–2012) for BBC Two – total 12 episodes.
- Eternal Law: one series (2012) for ITV1 – total 6 episodes.
- Hustle: eight series (2004–2012) for BBC One – total 48 episodes.
- Spooks: ten series (2002–2011) for BBC One – total 86 episodes
- Outcasts: one series (2011) for BBC One – total 8 episodes
- Ashes to Ashes: three series (2008–2010) for BBC One – total 24 episodes.
- Occupation: one series (2009) – Three-part drama serial following three troops sent to Basra in 2003 for BBC One.
- The Fixer: two series (2008–2009) for ITV1 – total 12 episodes.
- Moving Wallpaper: two series (2008–2009) for ITV1 – total 18 episodes.
- Life on Mars (American TV series): one series (2008–2009) for ABC. In association with ABC Studios and 20th Century Fox Television. Total 17 episodes.
- Plus One: one series (2009) for Channel 4 – total 5 episodes. Pilot episode previously broadcast in 2007 before being developed into a full series.
- Spooks: Code 9: one series (2008) for BBC Three. Total 6 episodes.
- Burn Up: mini-series (2008) for BBC Two – total 2 episodes.
- HolbyBlue: two series (2007–2008) for BBC One – total 20 episodes.
- Echo Beach: one series (2008) for ITV1 – total 12 episodes.
- West 10 LDN: single episode pilot (2008) for BBC3 – total 1 episode.
- Nearly Famous: one series (2007) for E4 – total 6 episodes.
- Secret Life: one-off episode (2007) for Channel 4 – total 1 episode.
- Tsunami: The Aftermath: mini-series (2007) for BBC One – total 2 episodes.
- The Amazing Mrs Pritchard: one series (2006) for BBC One – total 6 episodes.
- Life on Mars: two series (2006–2007) for BBC One – total 16 episodes.
- Comfortably Numb: feature-length television film (2004) for Channel 4 – total 1 episode.
- Pleasureland: one series (2003) for Channel 4 – total 1 episode.
- Confidence Lab: one series (2002) for BBC Two – total 6 episodes.
- Anderson: single episode pilot (2000) for Channel 4, aired as part of Comedy Lab – total 1 episode.
- The Magician's House: two series (1999–2000) for CBBC – total 12 episodes.
- Psychos: one series (1999) for Channel 4 – total 6 episodes.
- Come on Down and Out: one-off episode (1999) for Channel 4 – total 1 episode.
- Nigel Slater's Real Food: one series (1998) for Channel 4 – total 7 episodes.
- Roald Dahl's Revolting Recipes: one series (1997) for BBC1 – total 13 episodes.
- Desperately Seeking Something: three series (1995–1998) for Channel 4 – total 14 episodes.
- Good Ideas of the 20th Century: one series (1993–1994) for Channel 4 – total 6 episodes.
- Screaming Reels: four series (1993–1998) for Channel 4 – total 29 episodes.

=== Film ===
- Meeting People Is Easy (1998)
- Among Giants (1998)
- Pure (2002)
- Eastern Promises (2007)
- Miss Pettigrew Lives for a Day (2008)
- The Crimson Wing: Mystery of the Flamingos (2008) – a documentary on flamingos shot in Africa and produced by Disneynature
- Death of a Ladies Man (2009)
- Brighton Rock (2010)
- Salmon Fishing in the Yemen (2011)
- Spooks: The Greater Good (2015)

== Awards and nominations ==
2013

- Peabody Award for Broadchurch

2009

- Broadcast Magazine Supplement, The Indies – peer poll
- Televisual Bulldog Award – Best Indie

2008

- Televisual Bulldog Award – Best Indie

2007

- Broadcast Magazine Supplement, The Indies – peer poll
- Broadcast Awards – Best Independent Production Company – 2007
