= Stuart McQuarrie =

Scottish actor

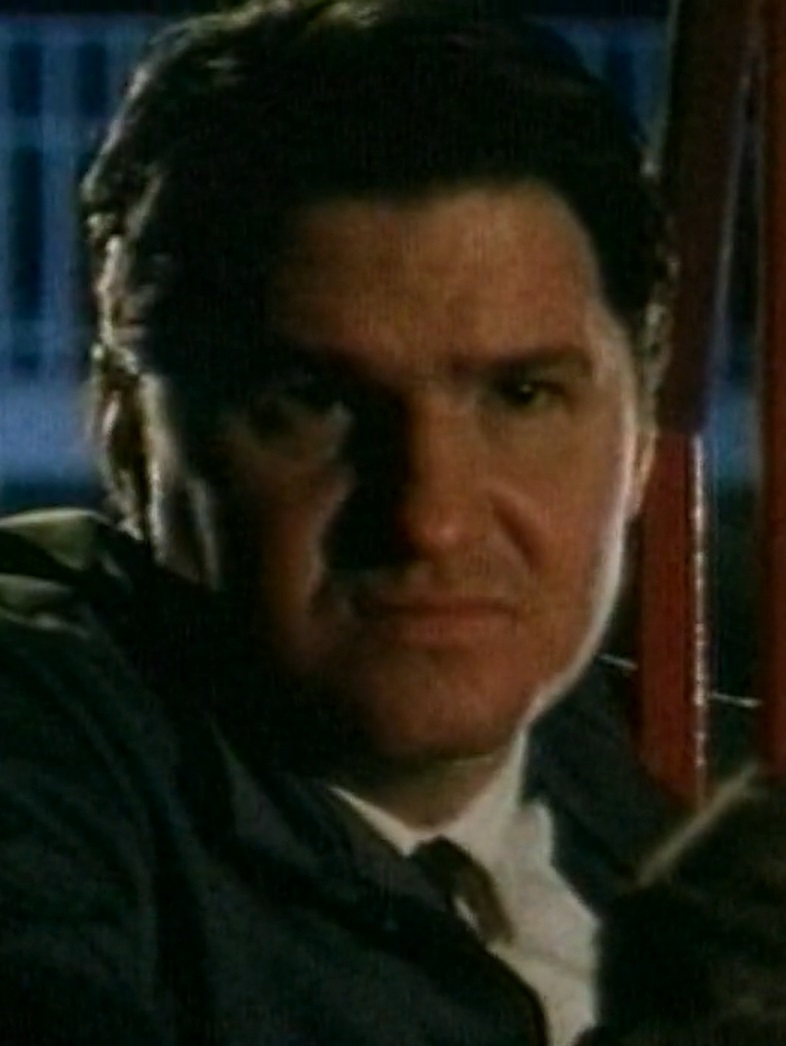
- McQuarrie in Love Me Tender 1997
- Born: 19 March 1963 (age 63); Scotland, United Kingdom
- Education: Royal Scottish Academy of Music and Drama
- Occupation: Actor
- Years active: 1987–present

Stuart McQuarrie (born 19 March 1963) is a Scottish actor who has performed extensively in theatre. In television he has appeared in Taggart (1990), Rab C. Nesbitt (1992), London's Burning (1994), Bugs (1997), Earth (1998), Silent Witness (2010), The Hollow Crown (2016), Foundation (2021), Shetland (2022), The Rig (2023). His other notable appearances include 28 Days Later (2002), Blood (2012), Mr. Turner (2014), Terminator: Dark Fate (2019), The Nest (2020), and White Bird (2024).

== Biography ==
McQuarrie trained at the Royal Scottish Academy of Music and Drama (RSAMD) in Glasgow. He became a highly popular actor amongst Edinburgh theatre goers before moving to London, where he has played prominent roles in more controversial, new dramas by playwrights such as Sarah Kane and Anthony Neilson, amongst others. In 2006 McQuarrie returned to Edinburgh, where he played himself in the critically acclaimed National Theatre of Scotland production of Realism by Anthony Neilson, for which he won the Glasgow Herald Angel award and was nominated for Best Male Actor by CATS (Critics Awards for Theatre in Scotland). Charles Spencer of the Daily Telegraph wrote: "Stuart McQuarrie plays Stuart, bringing a delightful, rueful quality to a man who can't make a piece of toast without burning it, or have a sexual fantasy without his mother interrupting the scenario".

== Performances ==
Film
Year	Title	Role	Notes
1996	Trainspotting	Gavin and US Tourist	
1997	The Life of Stuff	Leonard	
2002	The Honeytrap	Jeremy	
2002	28 Days Later	Sergeant Farrell	
2003	Young Adam	Bill	
2003	The Deal	Scottish MP 1	
2007	Nobody's Perfect	Ken	Short film
2008	Hush	Thorpe	
2008	Franklyn	Clunes	
2009	Three Moments in Heaven	Richard	Short film
2010	Another Year	Tom's colleague	
2010	Isle of Dogs	Billy	
2010	Burke & Hare	Magistrate	
2012	Blood	David Saddler	
2013	Closer to the Moon	Dumitru Dămăceanu	
2014	Mr. Turner	Ruskin's father	
2015	Coach	Dad	Short film
2016	Billionaire Ransom	Thomas Herrick	
2017	Daphne	Adam	
2018	The Hurricane Heist	Niles	
2019	Angel Has Fallen	Dr Siebertz	
2019	Terminator: Dark Fate	Craig	
2020	The Nest	Jim	
2024	White Bird	Pastor Luc	

Television
Year	Title	Role	Notes
1987	The Continental	Jock	Television film
1990	City Lights	Colin	Episode "Old Friends"
1990–2007	Taggart	Jack Lynch, Dave Jobson, Garage mechanic	5 episodes
1992	Rab C. Nesbitt	DSS Clerk	Episode "Ethics"
1993	I, Lovett	Black Cloud	Episode "Romance" (voice)
1994	London's Burning	Magic	Series 7 Episode 13
1994	Doctor Finlay	Dr Dean McKenna	Episode "Old Flames"
1994–1995	The High Life	Struan Byre	Episodes "Pilot" (1994), "Choob" (1995)
1995	Hamish Macbeth	D.S. Cronk	Episode "The Big Freeze"
1995	The Peter Principle	David Edwards	Episode "Pilot"
1995–2017	Casualty	Andrew Hayes, Tony Malvin	Episodes "All's Fair" (1995), Series 32 Episode 12 (2017)
1997	Love Me Tender	Billy	Television film
1997	Staying Alive	Justin Gregson	Series 2 Episode 4
1997	Bugs	Donaldson	Episode "Happy Ever After?"
1998	Earth	Flt Lt Gerry Llewellyn	Episode "The Last War"
1998	The Echo	Barry	Series 1 Episodes 1, 2
1998	Butterfly Collectors	Frank Faulkner	Television film
1998–2010	Silent Witness	Derek Tripp, Alastair Rogers	4 episodes
1999	Four Fathers	Spud Starkie	
1999	Trial by Fire	Ian Watmough	Television film
2001	The Way We Live Now	Lord Nidderdale	Television miniseries
2003	The Deal	Scottish MP 1	Television film
2004–2006	Life Begins	Guy	Recurring role
2005	Nathan Barley	Man at bar	Series 1 Episode 5
2005	Marian, Again	Jim	Television film
2005	The Golden Hour	Insp Simon Padden	Television miniseries
2005	A Very Social Secretary	Boris Johnson	Television film
2005	The Ghost Squad	Keith Warren	Episode "Greater Good"
2006	Rebus	Martin Cowan	Episode "The Black Book"
2006–2009	The Bill	Anthony Walker, DCI Bruce Matthews	3 episodes
2007	Peep Show	Gym manager	Episode "Gym"
2007	The Whistleblowers	Hugh Quarrie	Episode "Pandemic"
2007	Extras	Shop manager	Episode "The Extra Special Series Finale"
2010	Any Human Heart	Wallace Douglas	Series 1 Episode 1
2012	Hustle	DS Rivet	Episode "Eat Yourself Slender"
2012	Lip Service	Hugh	6 episodes
2012	Blackout	Eddie Dayton	3 episodes
2014	Babylon	Oliver Philpot	Episode "London"
2015	We're Doomed! The Dad's Army Story	Tom Sloan	Television film
2016	Dickensian	Reverend Chadband	Episode 14
2016	The Hollow Crown	Vernon	Episodes "Henry IV Part 1", "Henry IV Part 2"
2017	Prime Suspect 1973	Jeremy Dunford	Episode 5
2017	Harlots	Doctor	Series 1 Episode 5
2017	My Country	Caledonia	Television film
2018	Ordeal by Innocence	Doctor	Episode 3
2018	Strangers	Interviewer	Episode 7
2018	Outlander	Tim Baird	Episode "Savages"
2019	The Crown	George Thomson	Episodes "Coup", "Tywysog Cymru"
2019	Elizabeth Is Missing	Peter	Television film
2020	The Singapore Grip	Dr Brownley	Episodes "The Human Condition", "Survival Instinct"
2020	Des	Ronald Moss	Episode 1
2021	Foundation	Lunden	5 episodes
2022	Shetland	Murry Rankin	5 episodes
2023	The Rig	Colin Murchison	Recurring role
2023	The Tower	DCI Jim Fedden	Series 2 Episodes 1, 4

Theatre
Year	Title	Role	Director	Venue/Producer	Notes	Ref.
	The Snow Queen	Jack	Alan Liddyard	Dundee Rep		
	Hay Fever	Sandy Tyrell	Hugh Hodgart	Royal Lyceum Theatre		
	The Glass Menagerie	Gentleman Caller	Ian Wooldridge	Royal Lyceum Theatre		
	The Merchant of Venice	Gratiano	Ian Wooldridge	Royal Lyceum Theatre		
	Charley's Aunt	Charley	Ian Brown	Royal Lyceum Theatre		
	Death of a Salesman	Happy	Ian Wooldridge	Royal Lyceum Theatre		
	Mother Courage	Swiss Cheese	Ian Wooldridge	Royal Lyceum Theatre		
	The Slab Boys	Alan Downie	Ian Wooldridge	Royal Lyceum Theatre		
	Look Back in Anger	Cliff	Ian Wooldridge	Royal Lyceum Theatre		
	The Country Wife	Mr Dorilant	Hugh Hodgart	Royal Lyceum Theatre		
	The Comedians	Ged Murray	Ian Wooldridge	Royal Lyceum Theatre		
	The Bevellers	Charlie	Kenny Ireland	Royal Lyceum Theatre		
	Arsenic and Old Lace	Mortimer	Ben Twist	Royal Lyceum Theatre		
	Good Morning, Bill	Bill	Hugh Hodgart	Royal Lyceum Theatre		
	Laurel and Hardy	Oliver	Richard Baron	Royal Lyceum Theatre		
	A Midsummer Night's Dream	Puck	Ian Brown	TAG Theatre Company		
	City Lights	Barrett	Ron Bain	PDB		
	Loose Ends	Spud	Ian Brown	Traverse Theatre		
	Clocked Out	Dodie	Ben Twist	Traverse Theatre		
1989	Ines de Castro	Pedro	Ian Brown	Traverse Theatre		
	Hardie and Baird	Mr Hugh	Ian Brown	Traverse Theatre		
1992	The Life of Stuff	Leonard	Simon Donald	Traverse Theatre		
	The House Among the Stars	Edouard	Ian Brown	Traverse Theatre		
	The Thrie Estaites		Tom Fleming	Edinburgh Festival		
	Macbeth	Ross	Michael Boyd	Tron Theatre, Dundee Rep		
1993	The Life of Stuff	Leonard	Matthew Warchus	Donmar Warehouse		
1994	The Slab Boys Trilogy	Spanky	Tim Supple	Young Vic		
1996	Shining Souls	Charlie	Ian Brown	Traverse Theatre		
1997	The Government Inspector	Dobchinhsky	Jonathan Kent	Almeida Theatre		
1997	Shining Souls	Charlie	Chris Hannan	The Old Vic		
1998	Cleansed	Tinker	James Macdonald	Royal Court Theatre		
1998	Our Country's Good		Max Stafford-Clark	International tour (Out of Joint Theatre Company)		
1999	The Taming of the Shrew	Christopher Sly, Petruchio	Lindsay Posner	The Pit, Barbican Centre (RSC)		
2002	Ivanov	Mikhail Borkin	Katie Mitchell	National Theatre		
2003	Scenes From the Big Picture	Harry Foggarty	Peter Gill	National Theatre		
2003	Scenes From the Big Picture	Harry Foggarty	Peter Gill	National Theatre		
2004	The Dark	John	Anna Mackmin	Donmar Warehouse		
2005	The God of Hell	Frank	Kathy Burke	Donmar Warehouse		
2006	Realism	Stuart McQuarrie	Anthony Neilson	Royal Lyceum Theatre	Nominated for Critics Awards for Theatre in Scotland 2006-7, Best Male Performance	
2008	Happy Now?	Carl	Thea Sharrock	National Theatre		
2008	Relocated	Art	Anthony Neilson	Royal Court Theatre		
2009	marble		Jeremy Herrin	Abbey Theatre, Dublin		
2010	Wanderlust	Alan	Simon Godwin	Royal Court Theatre		
2011	Clybourne Park	Dan/Russ	Dominic Cooke	Wyndham's Theatre		
2012	King James Bible Readings	Reader: The Gospel According To Luke	James Dacre	National Theatre		
2012	Detroit	Ben	Austin Pendleton	National Theatre		
2012	Ding Dong the Wicked	A Man Who Is A Wreck/An Overweight Man	Dominic Cooke	Royal Court Theatre		
2012–2013	In the Republic of Happiness	Dad/middle aged man	Dominic Cooke	Royal Court Theatre		
2013	Emil and the Detectives	Mr Snow	Bijan Sheibani	National Theatre		
2015	Here We Go	Ensemble	Dominic Cooke	National Theatre		
2016	Ma Rainey's Black Bottom	Sturdyvant	Dominic Cooke	National Theatre		
2017	My Country: A Work In Progress	Caledonia	Rufus Norris	National Theatre, UK tour		
2018	Creditors	Gustav	Stewart Laing	Royal Lyceum Theatre, Edinburgh		
2018–2019	Sweat	Stan	Lynette Linton	Donmar Warehouse, Gielgud Theatre		
2019	The Antipodes	Danny M2	Annie Baker, Chloe Lamford	National Theatre		
2022	The House of Shades	Alastair	Blanche McIntyre	Almeida Theatre		
