= The Rig (TV series) =

Supernatural thriller television series

- Genre: Supernatural thriller; Drama
- Created by: David Macpherson
- Written by: David Macpherson; Matthew Jacobs Morgan; Meg Salter
- Directed by: John Strickland; Alex Holmes
- Starring: Iain Glen; Emily Hampshire; Martin Compston; Mark Bonnar
- Music by: Blanck Mass
- Country of origin: United Kingdom
- Original language: English
- No. of series: 2
- No. of episodes: 12

Production
- Executive producers: Derek Wax; John Strickland
- Producer: Suzanne Reid
- Production locations: Edinburgh, Scotland
- Cinematography: John Lee
- Editors: Andrew McClelland; Colin Fair
- Running time: 47–55 minutes
- Production companies: Wild Mercury Productions; Amazon MGM Studios (Note: Credited as Amazon Studios for season 1.)

Original release
- Network: Amazon Prime Video
- Release: 6 January 2023 – 2 January 2025

The Rig is a British supernatural thriller television series created by David Macpherson for Amazon Prime Video. The series is directed by John Strickland, and is the first Amazon Original to be filmed entirely in Scotland. The series was released on 6 January 2023 and consists of six episodes. In February 2023, The Rig was renewed for a second series which premiered on 2 January 2025.

== Premise ==
A Scottish oil rig in the North Sea is enveloped in an unnatural fog that cuts them off from outside communications. Spores found in the fog cause infected crew members to experience behavioural changes. After examining the spores, a scientist on board the oil rig suspects that an ancient parasite has been unleashed from the ocean floor.

== Cast and characters ==
- Emily Hampshire as Rose Mason: The oil company representative and scientist, and a fresh face on board the rig.
- Iain Glen as Magnus MacMillan: The leader of the crew and the offshore installation manager of the rig.
- Martin Compston as Fulmer Hamilton, the radio and communications officer on the Kinlock Bravo crew
- Mark Bonnar as Alwyn Evans, an older and experienced crew member with an interest in history, archaeology, and reading (series 1)
- Rochenda Sandall as Cat Braithwaite, the medic on the rig
- Owen Teale as Lars Hutton, a crew member who's been stationed on the rig for a long time, and who begins to sow tension and division on the rig
- Richard Pepple as Grant Dunlin (series 1)
- Calvin Demba as Baz Roberts, a young, relatively inexperienced crew member who wants to get off the rig (series 1)
- Emun Elliott as Alec "Leck" Longman (series 1)
- Abraham Popoola as Easter Ayodeji
- Stuart McQuarrie as Colin Murchison, the rig's cook
- Molly Vevers as Heather Shaw
- Dougie Rankin as William Johnson (series 1)
- Nikhil Parmar as Harish, a survivor from Kinloch Charlie
- Mark Addy as David Coake, Pictor's research head
- Neshla Caplan as Kacey, Cat's wife
- Ross Anderson as Kyle Cameron (series 2), the Stac's diver
- Alice Krige as Morgan Lennox (series 2), Pictor's CEO
- Johannes Roaldsen Fürst as Askel (series 2), the Stac's scientist
- Jacob Fortune-Lloyd as Darian York (series 2), an investor at Pictor, later becomes its CEO
- Phil McKee as Bremner (series 2), Coake's assistant

== Episodes ==
Series	Episodes	Originally released
1	6	6 January 2023
2	6	2 January 2025

=== Series 1 (2023) ===
No. overall	No. in series	Title	Directed by	Written by	Original release date
1	1	"Episode 1"	John Strickland	David Macpherson	6 January 2023
Pictor's oil rig Kinloch Bravo in the North Sea begins experiencing strange events, such as tremors and electrical faults. Their boss Magnus shuts down the drills. A mysterious fog rolls in as well, reducing the visibility and cutting off contact from mainland Scotland. At the communications tower, Baz falls down as his harness ends up uncoupled from the railings above; he’s barely alive. The Pictor representative Rose figures out that although they’ve shut down their well, the line back to the shore should still be pumping from the other rigs but none of them are, indicating that whatever’s causing this has spread across to the whole field. Hutton, an angry employee, rallies the people together and tells them the management (including Magnus and Rose) are leaving Baz to die. Magnus finally admits that Pictor is going to terminate the whole oil rig field, and that they are not going to be employed for much longer. Ash starts raining down on them and Baz suddenly wakes up and tells them “It’s too late. It’s already started.”
2	2	"Episode 2"	John Strickland	David Macpherson	6 January 2023
Baz wakes up and admits to Rose he's experiencing strange symptoms and visions. The crew are not happy with Pictor and Magnus tells Dunlin that Pictor is moving to renewable energy. Leck is able to establish contact with the stand-by vessel below. Rose collects a sample of the ash; Cat, the doctor in the med bay realizes Baz is missing. Alwyn finds Baz, but he runs away after saying there's something in the light. Leck bleeds to death from a tattoo in the shower; Heather finds his body. They conclude that inorganic material in the body is being rejected after exposure to the ash, for eg. fillings and tattoos, which lead to Leck's death. Fulmer and Alwyn investigate a strange light from outside, while Hutton argues with Magnus and Dunlin. Alwyn notices Baz on the lower part of the deck, but, on confrontation, Alwyn begins spewing water out of his mouth. Dunlin and Magnus try to resuscitate Alwyn, but he dies; in the ongoing confusion, Baz escapes. Cat figures out Alwyn somehow drowned. Rose figures out that the ash is some sort of a parasite and reacts to blood, with a cut or injury being fatal. Fulmer is shown having a cut when he was out in the ash.
3	3	"Episode 3"	John Strickland	David Macpherson	6 January 2023
Hutton is worried about getting home, while the fog mysteriously disappears. They discover that the other rig, Kinloch Charlie is covered in black smoke. Fulmer notices Baz in the Med Bay, who admits he didn’t mean to kill Alwyn. He claims that “they need us” and eventually rushes off when Rose shows up. Rose notices Fulmer’s cut hand and isolates him in the lab. Magnus sends the group to wash the rig and get rid of the ash and at the same time, keep an eye out for Baz. Meanwhile, Baz is in the production module and reacts to the oil, growing some sort of plant matter there, which leads to losing power. Rose deduces that the ash samples are from 300 million years ago and that they are linked to extinction events. Heather finds Baz who tells her he needs to defend the rig and says “It’s all dying”. He mentions how this is the beginning and the end of all things with an infected Garrow also joining him. Rose is able to get the power back, but the ignition system is not responding and the only solution to turn it back on is to use a crane to get as close as possible to it and then shoot a flare through, but risk getting blown up. Fulmer manages to do so and is burnt, but survives.
4	4	"Episode 4"	Alex Holmes	Meg Salter	6 January 2023
Baz and Garrow try to turn off the pipes completely. Rose and Fulmer share a moment in the Med Bay while Heather tells Magnus, Baz is not aggressive. Rose believes that the spores in the ash is from an Ancestor which is the oldest organism on the Earth. Cat reveals to Rose and Heather that she is pregnant with her wife Kacey's child, which Fulmer overhears. With the pressure out of control, they go to the source in the seabed and discover a strange symbol, which looks like concentric circles. Baz deduces that he needs to bring Fulmer in as he’s the only one who can stop this, due to him being exposed to the Ancestor as well. Rose uncovers something called Project Cirein which is above her authorization. Baz, Garrow and Fulmer start drawing the concentric circles on the seabed; Rose confronts Fulmer who tells her that he is healing at a rapid rate. Everyone is worried about the fog reaching the mainland, and tensions start to rise. Heather inadvertently tells everyone Cat is pregnant; however Cat forgives her. Rose is able to calm everyone and returns to find Fulmer missing. Cat sees Fulmer going to Baz and Garrow and together with Rose, finds the plant life. The crew thinks they might finally be getting rescued as a ship approaches.
5	5	"Episode 5"	Alex Holmes	Matthew Jacobs Morgan	6 January 2023
A lifeboat from Kinloch Charlie arrives with survivors. Among those on the boat is David Coake, who happens to be part of Pictor Research & Expansion, and gets updated on what’s happened across the Rig. One of the survivors, Harish, who is also Easter's ex-boyfriend, tells them that only after Coake came onboard to send something down to the water, did the problems start to arise. Rose has concerns over what Coake is actually doing here and Magnus encourages Rose to keep researching, while he deals with Coake. Heather figures out that Coake's name is not on the team, and together with Harish and Easter, realize that Coake has already seen the Ancestor before. Rose deduces that the rings are actually part of a way for measuring time, similar to the ones inside a tree and that the rings appear to be matching the time between each of the five major mass extinction events. The last ring hasn’t closed yet and it appears Baz and the others are trying to cause this extinction event themselves. The crew realize Coake isn't giving them the full truth while he tries to bring back Baz and Garrow. However, the plan ends up a failure as Garrow and Dunlin die, and Fulmer and Baz barely survive with Rose helping Fulmer. Hutton and Magnus decide to stand together and stop Coake. On the sea bed, the final ring joins together.
6	6	"Episode 6"	Alex Holmes	David Macpherson	6 January 2023
Harish tells them that two days ago, due to Coake messing around with the circle on the seabed, pressure goes out of control leading to Kinloch Charlie getting covered in smoke and fire. He also mentioned Coake made them wipe everything from the system and that a lot of people did not survive. Coake reveals that if they’re not careful, the ash will spread throughout the mainland but they need to try and kill its source right here. Rose has Fulmer try to contact Baz and he gets a vision; the Ancestor is going to trigger a new Storegga Slide. They realize Baz may be the only one with a solution as he's been telling them to listen ever since he was infected. Coake reveals to Harish that helicopters are on their way to save them both and that Pictor intends to cover all of this up and completely destroy the Ancestor at its source, however Harish isn't willing to leave everyone behind and secretly broadcasts the whole conversation to everyone; they manage to overpower Coake. Meanwhile, Rose tries to connect to the Ancestor and the blue spores become a circle. The place suddenly begins shaking from tremors down below. Baz decides to stay behind and sacrifice himself for the greater good, while a giant tsunami looks set to hit the rig. Everyone climbs on board the helicopters while the tsunami hits the rig; Coake reveals that they’re not heading to the mainland but somewhere else. On the mainland, Cat's wife Kacey experiences massive tremors and sees the huge wave.

=== Series 2 (2025) ===
No. overall	No. in series	Title	Directed by	Written by	Original release date
7	1	"Episode 1"	John Strickland	David Macpherson	2 January 2025
The group is taken to another rig called the Stac on the Arctic where Fulmer and Cat are placed in isolation for observation, but are later released. The survivors are offered £200,000 if they sign a non-disclosure agreement, which Hutton and Cat accept. A news bulletin reveals a powerful tsunami has hit the North Sea coastline, triggering international responses and aid. Pictor CEO Morgan Lennox meets Rose and tells her the company is mining rare earth metals for renewable energy. Coake tells them that a survey team is lost on the Mid-Atlantic Ridge and the company puts Rose in charge, and she selects Easter and the Stac's diver Cameron (who is another ex-boyfriend of Harish) for the rescue mission. They find the crew dead, but Cameron collects their data log in secret. This triggers the Ancestor, sending samples of the Ancestor in the lab in chaos. More of the Ancestors surround the recovery vessel and remove their umbilical cord, leaving them with no connection to the Stac.
8	2	"Episode 2"	John Strickland	David Macpherson	2 January 2025
Cameron and Easter send out a sonic shockwave which frightens the Ancestor and gives Fulmer visions. The rover is still not able to move, so the Stac itself descends to recover the rescue crew, via a subsea module lift as well as by explosives kept by Magnus, Fulmer, and Coake's assistant, Bremner. Fulmer admits that he’s still connected to the Ancestor and Rose is hurt at him keeping secrets from her. Cat is forced into a press conference alongside Lennox, where she is forced to lie about what happened on Kinloch Bravo, as part of the NDA. Cameron refuses to give the data log to Coake and Bremner. Askel, the scientist on board the Stac, believes that the organism contains nodes that hold the whole system together. He also tells the crew that Pictor’s plan is to find one of these nodes, and introduce the poison to its heart so it spreads through the whole system in order to destroy the Ancestor.
9	3	"Episode 3"	John Strickland	David Macpherson	2 January 2025
Fulmer collapses and after waking up, claims he could hear a message from the Ancestor, as garbled noise. Coake tells Fulmer he can remove it, via a life-saving blocker in the form of a shot that drives foreign organisms out of the host; he offers the shot in exchange for the data log, from Cameron. Harish figures out that the company is trying to grab as many underwater rights as possible, for mining, oil, shipping etc; the idea is to strip the Arctic Ocean, in advance of a planned auction. Darian York, one of Pictor's investors, tells Lennox their Arctic plans must succeed. Cat starts helping survivors who need medical attention, with Hutton's help. Fulmer retrieves the data log and hands it over to Coake, though turns out it’s the wrong drive as Cameron had switched them. Coake fights with Cameron about the switch, but during the fight, Cameron stabs Coake in the neck, killing him.
10	4	"Episode 4"	Alex Holmes	Meg Salter	2 January 2025
Cameron claims he killed Coake to stop him from going after the Ancestor again, which could potentially trigger another disaster. Cameron also tells Rose about the deal struck by Fulmer and Coake. York tells Lennox to bury any investigation into the death, which she does by claiming it was an accident. Fulmer reveals to Rose that he didn’t want the life-saving blocker, but pretended, to get information out of Coake. He also tells Rose to connect with the Ancestor and not use his connections if she wants to contact it; they break up. Askel decodes a signal that the Ancestor appears to be sending out, then heads onto the ice along with Heather, Magnus and Murch to investigate a mysterious ridge that has emerged from under the water; he discovers that pollutants in the ice match the chemicals that Pictor was using. The Ancestor appears to attack them, but Askel plays the Ancestor’s signal back to it, which makes it leave. York fires Lennox as the CEO of Pictor and decides to finalize the deal for the Arctic himself. Cat and Hutton speak to a journalist, with plans to expose Pictor Energy; Cat is then taken to Kacey, found alive, but whose condition is serious. Cameron tells Rose that the data log contains information on how to destroy the Ancestor but Bremner pulls a gun on them.
11	5	"Episode 5"	Alex Holmes	David Macpherson	2 January 2025
Rose and Cameron talk to Bremner and he reveals he's doing it for the money. He also has contacted York, who claims to help him. Cameron tells him the log is in the lab; Bremner demands the remaining crew evacuate by heading to the surface. On their way to the lab, Rose and Cameron knock Bremner down a flight of stairs and escape, and seal the flood doors, locking everyone in, and cutting the various floors off from each other. In the lab, Cameron tells Rose the drive is actually in Ore Processing, and that he was lying to Bremner. Fulmer, Magnus and Harish try to help them and finally, they locate the data log. Meanwhile, Askel posits that the Ancestor’s signal is a cry for help. A remorseful Lennox gives Cat a USB drive and ensures that Kacey gets the medication she requires. Bremner takes Harish hostage and demands the drive, however, Fulmer attacks Bremner, the gun goes off, and a bullet hits Rose, who falls unconscious.
12	6	"Episode 6"	Alex Holmes	David Macpherson	2 January 2025
Rose seemingly dies, but her bullet wound starts to heal; indicating that Rose connected to the Ancestor. Rose has a vision: the Ancestor did not cause the mass extinction events but rather is the force that allowed life to regenerate afterwards. Bremner sends the data log to York. The USB drive given by Cat broadcasts Lennox’s confession, but without mention of the Ancestor. She also returns to the Stac with Hutton, apologizes for her actions, and decides to stand with them against Pictor. She also confirms that the drive contains the location of the heart of the Ancestor, as well as the designs for a new delivery method for Coake's poison, using a long-range remote operated vehicle (ROV). York, in a new press conference, puts the blame on Lennox, and states that she was fired as CEO, due to her actions. Rose suggests showing the world the Ancestor and the team fixes the broken Rover, which Rose and Fulmer use to head out into the ocean. Bremner poisons the Ancestor using the ROV, though Magnus is able to catch him. Rose decides to try anyway and helps the Ancestor come back to life. The Ancestor lights up its trees everywhere beneath the water, announcing its existence to the planet. York loses his deal and the Stac arrives to rescue Fulmer and Rose. However, there appears to be a satellite up high monitoring their location.

== Production ==
=== Development ===
David Macpherson first came up with the idea for the series in 2018, based in part on the stories his father told him about working in the oil and gas industry. He sent a one-page pitch to producer Derek Wax, and began writing it in December 2018. In November 2020, it was announced that Amazon had greenlit The Rig. The series is written and created by David Macpherson, and directed and executive produced by John Strickland. Derek Wax also executive produces, while Suzanne Reid produces. Wax's company Wild Mercury Productions produces the series. On 22 February 2023, Amazon renewed it for a second series.

=== Writing ===
Work started on the series' scripts in December 2018. Meg Salter and Matthew Jacobs Morgan serve as writers.

=== Casting ===
In mid-March 2021, Emily Hampshire, Martin Compston, and Mark Bonnar were cast in key roles. The next day, Iain Glen, Rochenda Sandall, Owen Teale, Richard Pepple, Calvin Demba, Emun Elliott, Abraham Popoola, Stuart McQuarrie, and Molly Vevers were cast. Kelly Valentine-Hendry serves as the casting director for the series.

=== Filming ===
Filming started on 29 March 2021 at FirstStage Studios in Edinburgh. at which a three-storey oil rig stage was built, with some additional filming at a real oil rig in Scotland. The series is the first Amazon Original to be filmed entirely in Scotland. Filming wrapped in August 2021. The first three episodes were directed by John Strickland, and the final three were directed by Alex Holmes.

Filming for series 2 had begun by July 2023.

== Reception ==
The review aggregator website Rotten Tomatoes reports a 67% approval rating and an average rating of 6.2/10 based on 18 critic reviews. The website's critics consensus reads, "The Rig may not plumb its full potential thanks to too many crude clichés, but this supernatural eco-thriller has enough ambience and appealing performances to make for a solid binge." Metacritic, which uses a weighted average, gave a score of 69 out of 100 based on 7 critics, indicating "generally favorable reviews".

== Release ==
The official trailer was released on 29 November 2022. The first episode premièred at Everyman cinema in Edinburgh, Scotland, on 6 December 2022. The six-episode series was released on 6 January 2023.

The second series was released on 2 January 2025.
