= Mark Day (film editor) =

British film editor

- Born: 22 February 1961 (age 65); London, England
- Occupation: Film editor
- Years active: 1986–present
- Known for: Harry Potter film series

Mark Day (born 22 February 1961) is a British film editor. He won two BAFTA Awards for Best Editing for State of Play and Sex Traffic, both directed by David Yates with whom Day also worked with on The Way We Live Now, The Young Visiters and The Girl in the Café; the former two projects gained Day two Royal Television Society award nominations for Best Tape and Film Editing along with two BAFTA nominations and the latter project gained Day a Primetime Emmy Award nomination for Outstanding Single-Camera Picture Editing. Day also worked with Yates on The Sins and the final four Harry Potter films: Order of the Phoenix, Half-Blood Prince, Deathly Hallows – Part 1 and Deathly Hallows – Part 2. Day has edited over thirty television films and dramas.

== Filmography ==
=== Feature films ===
- The Theory of Flight (1998)
- Mystics (2003)
- Harry Potter and the Order of the Phoenix (2007)
- Harry Potter and the Half-Blood Prince (2009)
- Harry Potter and the Deathly Hallows – Part 1 (2010)
- Harry Potter and the Deathly Hallows – Part 2 (2011)
- The Company You Keep (2012)
- About Time (2013)
- Ex Machina (2014)
- The Legend of Tarzan (2016)
- Fantastic Beasts and Where to Find Them (2016)
- Fantastic Beasts: The Crimes of Grindelwald (2018)
- Downton Abbey (2019)
- Fantastic Beasts: The Secrets of Dumbledore (2022)
- Pain Hustlers (2023)
- Bridget Jones: Mad About the Boy (2025)
- The Woman in Cabin 10 (2025)
- Good Sex (2026)

=== Television films ===
- Whatever Love Means
- The Girl in the Café
- Sex Traffic
- The Young Visiters
- State of Play
- Rose and Maloney
- Flesh and Blood
- The Way We Live Now
- NCS Manhunt
- Shockers
- The Sins
- Anna Karenina
- The Murder Rooms
- Donovan Quick
- Split Second
- The Fix
- The Wingless Bird
- The Tale of Sweeny Todd
- Cold Comfort Farm
- A Royal Scandal
- The Tide of Life
- Criminal
- Royal Celebration
- Suddenly Last Summer
- The Hummingbird Tree
- Memento Mori
- A Question of Attribution
- Tell Me That You Love Me
- The Police
- Number 27
