= Sex Traffic =

2004 film directed by David Yates

- Genre: Thriller
- Written by: Abi Morgan
- Directed by: David Yates
- Starring: John Simm; Anamaria Marinca; Maria Popistașu; Chris Potter; Wendy Crewson; Len Cariou; Maury Chaykin; Luke Kirby; Robert Joy; Alison Peebles
- Composer: Jonathan Goldsmith
- Countries of origin: United Kingdom; Canada
- Original languages: English; Albanian; Italian; Romanian
- No. of episodes: 2

Production
- Executive producers: David MacLeod; Michele Buck; Wayne Grigsby
- Producers: Veronica Castillo; Derek Wax
- Cinematography: Chris Seager
- Editor: Mark Day
- Running time: 90 minutes (per episode)
- Production company: Big Motion Pictures

Original release
- Network: Channel 4
- Release: 14 October – 21 October 2004

Sex Traffic is a two-part British-Canadian television thriller, written by Abi Morgan and directed by David Yates, that first broadcast on Channel 4 on 14 October 2004. The series, produced by Veronica Castillo and Derek Wax, stars John Simm as Daniel Appleton, a journalist who uncovers a trafficking ring involving Anti-Trafficking officers employed by a private security company in the United States. As Daniel vows to help Elena (Anamaria Marinca), one of the trafficked girls, he attempts to expose the business which forces young women from Eastern Europe into a life of sexual slavery.

The series was filmed between London, Bucharest and Nova Scotia. The series was also broadcast on CBC in Canada during October 2004. Marinca, in her first credited television role, won the BAFTA award for Best Actress, one of eight BAFTAs, including Best Drama Serial, and four Gemini Awards for the series. The series was released on DVD on September 4, 2006.

== Plot ==
The expulsion of Sergeant Callum Tate, an Anti-Trafficking officer working in Bosnia, sparks concern for multi-national private security company Kernwell, headed up by Tom Harlsburgh. Having been caught seemingly trying to procure a prostitute for $2,000, Tate's actions have threatened to throw the entire company into disrepute, just as the directors are on the brink of signing an $8 million contract to provide private security in Iraq. Tate denies the allegations, claiming that he was trying to free Anya Petria, a student who had been trafficked from Romania and forced to work as a prostitute. Tate claims that a number of Kernwell officers, including Major James Brooke, are involved in a trafficking ring involving the enslavement of young women seeking refuge from their own countries in the hope of finding a better life in the West. Kernwell order a press blackout, preventing Tate's suspension or any of the allegations made reaching the press.

Meanwhile, Daniel Appleton, a journalist working for London-based charity Speak For Freedom, travels to Bosnia to report on Kernwell's activities, and whilst there, he witnesses a number of Anti-Trafficking officers having sex with prostitutes at a local bar. Before he can report his findings, the bar is raided and information is spread to suggest that he was caught having sex with a prostitute, Elena Visinescu, at the time of the raid. Appleton refutes the allegations, but is ordered to cease investigation into Kernwell by his boss, Joan Stewart. Appleton decides to continue privately investigating Kernwell, and discovers that shortly after leaving Bosnia, Anya's body was found washed up on the shores of an Italian beach. After becoming separated from her sister, Elena heads for London to find Appleton. With Elena's help, Appleton sets out to expose the corrupt officers working for the Anti-Trafficking unit and bring Kernwell to book.

== Cast ==
- John Simm as Daniel Appleton
- Anamaria Marinca as Elena Visinescu
- Maria Popistașu as Vara Visinescu
- Chris Potter as Tom Harlsburgh
- Wendy Crewson as Madeleine Harlsburgh
- Len Cariou as Magnus Herzoff
- Maury Chaykin as Ernie Dwight
- Luke Kirby as Sergeant Callum Tate
- Robert Joy as Major James Brooke
- Alison Peebles as Joan Stewart
- Dan Astileanu as Deputy Chief Rudi Lascar
- Razvan Vasilescu as Colonel Matteo Giusto
- Jason Watkins as Inspector Lucas Reese
- John Sharian as Barry Edwards
- Rodica Negrea as Luiba Visinescu
- Carlotta Natoli as Dr. Lola Carizonne
- Barbara Eve Harris as Audrey Dupoint
- Alexandra Fasola as Anya Petria
- Ephraim Ellis as Billy Harlsburgh
- Nikki Barnett as Leah Harlsburgh
- Arben Bajraktaraj as Thaki
- Emil Hostina as Severin
- Elina Löwensohn as Maria Danielski
- Zoltan Butuc as Petre Danielski

== Reception ==
Sex Traffic received critical acclaim across the board, with the British Film Institute's Screenonline writing; "As in his previous television work, including his adaptation of Anthony Trollope's The Way We Live Now which drew parallels between its ruthless Victorian entrepreneur hero and modern media tycoons, and the fine conspiracy thriller, State of Play, director David Yates gives a thrilling and complicated narrative a strong social and political dimension. The brutality of brothel life is tellingly juxtaposed with the ethics of Boston business, which is lavish with its charity while turning a knowingly blind eye to corruption. Sex Traffic is impeccably photographed, edited and scored."

The Daily Telegraph wrote, "Sex Traffic is brutally honest in its treatment of a distressing subject, but it's this very honesty that makes it such a vital drama. It does indeed go to the heart of the audience, and its dark images stay with you for a long, long time. Difficult viewing, yes, but essential." Empire commented that Sex Traffic was a "courageous, shocking piece of work", while The Guardian called it "a gripping thriller". John Simm commented, "Watching Sex Traffic is not a horrible experience, because it works well as a thriller, so it's exciting and you are always gunning for the good guys – but you can't escape the fact that it's a depressing subject matter."

=== Accolades ===
Year	Award	Category	Nominee	Result	Ref.
2005	British Academy Television Awards	Best Drama Serial	Derek Wax, David Yates, Abi Morgan	Won	
2005	British Academy Television Awards	Best Actress	Anamaria Marinca	Won	
2005	British Academy Television Craft Awards	Best Original Television Music	Jonathan Goldsmith	Won	
2005	British Academy Television Craft Awards	Best Editing: Fiction/Entertainment	Mark Day	Won	
2005	British Academy Television Craft Awards	Best Costume Design	Anushia Nieradzik	Nominated	
2005	British Academy Television Craft Awards	Best Photography & Lighting: Fiction	Chris Seager	Won	
2005	British Academy Television Craft Awards	Make-Up & Hair Design	Caroline Noble	Won	
2005	British Academy Television Craft Awards	Best Production Design	Candida Otton	Won	
2005	British Academy Television Craft Awards	Best Sound: Entertainment	Simon Okin, Jane Tattersall, David McCallum, Lou Solakofski	Won	
2005	Gemini Awards	Best Dramatic Mini-Series	Wayne Grigsby, Michele Buck, David MacLeod, Derek Wax	Won	
2005	Gemini Awards	Best Direction in a Dramatic Program or Mini-Series	David Yates (for "Part 1")	Nominated	
2005	Gemini Awards	Best Writing in a Dramatic Program or Mini-Series	Abi Morgan (for "Part 1")	Nominated	
2005	Gemini Awards	Best Performance by an Actor in a Leading Role in a Dramatic Program or Mini-Series	John Simm (for "Part 1")	Nominated	
2005	Gemini Awards	Best Performance by an Actress in a Leading Role in a Dramatic Program or Mini-Series	Wendy Crewson (for "Part 1")	Nominated	
2005	Gemini Awards	Best Performance by an Actress in a Leading Role in a Dramatic Program or Mini-Series	Anamaria Marinca (for "Part 1")	Nominated	
2005	Gemini Awards	Best Performance by an Actor in a Featured Supporting Role in a Dramatic Program or Mini-Series	Chris Potter (for "Part 1")	Nominated	
2005	Gemini Awards	Best Performance by an Actor in a Featured Supporting Role in a Dramatic Program or Mini-Series	Luke Kirby (for "Part 1")	Nominated	
2005	Gemini Awards	Best Performance by an Actress in a Featured Supporting Role in a Dramatic Program or Mini-Series	Maria Popistasu (for "Part 1")	Won	
2005	Gemini Awards	Best Photography in a Dramatic Program or Series	Chris Seager (for "Part 1")	Nominated	
2005	Gemini Awards	Best Picture Editing in a Dramatic Program or Series	Mark Day (for "Part 1")	Nominated	
2005	Gemini Awards	Best Production Design or Art Direction in a Dramatic Program or Series	Candida Otton (for "Part 1")	Won	
2005	Gemini Awards	Best Costume Design	Anushia Nieradzik (for "Part 1")	Won	
2005	Gemini Awards	Best Sound in a Dramatic Program	Kathy Choi, Barry Gilmore, Steve Hammond, Ronayne Higginson, Janice Ierulli, Garrett Kerr, Stephan Carrier, David McCallum, Lou Solakofski, Mark Shnuriwsky, Jane Tattersall, Robert Warchol, Rod Deogrades, Simon Okin, Jane Porter (for "Part 1")	Nominated	
2005	Royal Television Society Programme Awards	Drama Serial	Sex Traffic	Won	
2005	Royal Television Society Programme Awards	Actor: Female	Anamaria Marinca	Won	
2005	Royal Television Society Craft & Design Awards	Costume Design - Drama	Anushia Nieradzik	Nominated	
2005	Royal Television Society Craft & Design Awards	Lighting, Photography and Camera - Photography (Drama)	Chris Seager	Nominated	
2005	Royal Television Society Craft & Design Awards	Production Design - Drama	Candida Otton	Won	
2005	Royal Television Society Craft & Design Awards	Sound - Drama	Sound Team	Nominated	
2005	Royal Television Society Craft & Design Awards	Tape and Film Editing - Drama	Mark Day	Won	

== See also ==
- Human trafficking
- Human Trafficking (miniseries)
