= Occupation (TV series) =

- Brown, Graham and Nesbitt
- Genre: War drama
- Written by: Peter Bowker
- Directed by: Nick Murphy
- Starring: James Nesbitt; Stephen Graham; Warren Brown; Nonso Anozie; Yigal Naor
- Country of origin: United Kingdom
- No. of episodes: 3

Production
- Executive producer: Derek Wax
- Producer: Laurie Borg
- Production locations: Northern Ireland, Morocco
- Running time: 180 mins.
- Production companies: Kudos; BBC Northern Ireland

Original release
- Network: BBC One
- Release: 16 June – 18 June 2009

Occupation is a three-part drama serial broadcast by BBC One in June 2009. It was written by Peter Bowker and produced by Kudos for BBC Northern Ireland.

It took four years to bring the serial to screen. Filming took place in Morocco and Northern Ireland.

The serial follows the fortunes of three British Army soldiers from the 2003 invasion of Basra to 2007. Each is inspired to return to Basra for different reasons: one returns for love, one for monetary gain, and one for his belief in the mission to rebuild the country.

It received the British Academy Television Award for Best Drama Serial in 2010.

== Episodes ==
=== Episode 1 ===
A British Army section led by Sergeant Mike Swift are attempting to assault a sniper group in an apartment block in Basra. The group are caught in a grenade blast, and several members of the section and an innocent young Iraqi girl are injured. Swift carries the girl to a local hospital, where he meets Dr Aliya Nabil. The unit returns to Manchester, England, with Swift being hailed as a hero, but all experience difficulty integrating back into normal family life. The girl and Aliya have also travelled to England, and Swift begins to fall in love with the doctor, nearly embarking on an affair. Having left the Army, Corporal Danny Ferguson finds solace in drugs, before going into partnership with Sergeant Erik Lester, a former U.S. Marine who was impressed by Ferguson's calmness under fire and has gone into business as a contractor for a private military company. Ferguson and Lester return to Iraq, and secure a contract to escort American businessmen around hospitals and clinics they are planning to rebuild. Lance Corporal Lee Hibbs, having also left the Army and being unimpressed with work as a nightclub bouncer, joins Ferguson and Lester, thinking he can play a role in rebuilding Iraq. On their first assignment, the escort group dress and apply makeup to look like Arabs, and begin their escort job in two old cars. After becoming separated from their other car, Ferguson and Lester, with the American businessman, are ambushed in a roadblock, and the episode ends with Ferguson somewhat comically stripping naked in front of a British patrol shouting "I'm from Kirkby!", mirroring the actor's real world origins, in order to prove he is British, the car having been driven away from the ambush by Lester, who has been shot in the neck. Meanwhile, Aliya and the little girl return to Iraq without telling Swift, leading him to volunteer to return.

=== Episode 2 ===
Episode 2 begins in March 2004, four months after episode 1. Swift, promoted to Staff Sergeant and transferred to the Royal Army Medical Corps, is looking for Aliya by enquiring at her former hospital, where he meets Dr Sadiq Alasadi (Yigal Naor), a male doctor and influential local figure, who had been missing presumed dead in prison under Saddam Hussein's rule. Having saved the American, Lester and Ferguson outfit, Pacific Solutions, has flourished, and they are looking to expand from simple escort protection of contractors, to organising the reconstruction projects as well, starting with Sadiq's hospital. Reunited, Ferguson informs Swift that he knows where Aliya is, and while as a friend warns him against contacting her, as a businessman he says he will tell him, in exchange for putting a word in with Sadiq. He agrees, but on finding her working in another clinic she again refuses his advances and reveals she had been married all along. Swift, Ferguson and Lester meet Sadiq at the hospital, and once he learns of Swift's earlier heroics, Paterson and Lester secure the contract. In the process, Swift learns that Sadiq is Aliya's husband, to the amusement of Lester and Ferguson. On a further visit, Aliya rejects an offer from Swift to take her to England, even though conditions for her are worsening in Iraq.

Moving into August 2004, Yunis, an Iraqi translator working for Pacific solutions, who has befriended Hibbs, leaves the firm to set up his own pizzeria. While at his shop, Yunis is murdered by two Iraqi policeman for collaborating. Hibbs is off guard not expecting danger, as he trained the pair while he was in the Army. Hibbs, angry at the death, seeks revenge, but is persuaded not to act by Ferguson and Lester. Fearing he is having a breakdown, Ferguson arranges for Swift to take Hibbs back to England on his transport a week later, as he finishes his second tour.

A year later, Hibbs and Swift are back home, and it is around the time of the 7 July 2005 London bombings. Hibbs' view of the Iraqi people has hardened, and he states he endorses the July attackers' actions, if it makes his sister, who has constantly opposed the war, realise "what they are like". Meanwhile, in Iraq, Pacific Solutions is expanding, and Ferguson and Lester enter a partnership with Western investors in Dubai, explaining how they cream money off the top of coalition reconstruction grants by inventing cost overruns. Swift's wife has guessed that he had an affair and demands he leave the marital home. Hibbs, obsessed with Yunis's death, returns to Iraq at Christmas, visits his wife and family, and gives them all his savings. On leaving their house, he is kidnapped by a militant group led by the two policeman he knows. The episode ends with Hibbs being forced to video a statement stating that he is a private contractor and he and the United States and British forces should not be in Iraq. Meanwhile, against the wishes of Lester, Ferguson and a colleague look for him in the streets of Basra.

=== Episode 3 ===
Still in December 2005, Ferguson has located the police station where Hibbs is being held after being told by Yassin, Yunis's teenage son, who witnessed the kidnap. He is successfully exchanged for money, to the anger of Lester. To pay back Lester, Ferguson persuades him that Hibbs can be used to drive a regular truck shipment they have been contracted to undertake from Kuwait to Basra, which routinely runs empty while Pacific Solutions are still paid for the job. Ferguson and Lester meet Sadiq to sign off on a contract. After Ferguson attempts a last minute change to the sundries total from $6,000 to $60,000, the doctor refuses to sign the contract, to the annoyance of Lester who sees an avenue to millions of dollars' worth of contacts closed. Back at base, Ferguson forges the doctor's signature on the contract and tells Lester to go ahead with it. Sadiq gets into an argument with three young militiamen who want treatment for a wounded member, but object to the hospital's continued use of women doctors against mosque instructions. As he leaves for home, he is kidnapped by unseen assailants as he stands next to his car.

By June 2007, Swift's son, Richard, has decided to join the Army, and instead of leaving the Army, Swift, who is now divorced, returns to Basra to watch over his son on his first tour. Relations between Lester and Ferguson worsen as Ferguson expresses boredom with life in Dubai. They agree to split their skills, with Lester in Dubai and Petersen in Basra. Swift learns of Sadiq's kidnap, and visits his wife in the hospital, where she is now forced to work out of sight in the pharmacy. While he is obliged to communicate through a male intermediary, she tells him she does not know who is holding him and that no ransom demand has been made. After consulting with Yassin, Swift theorises that, since no ransom has been demanded, he may have been arrested by British or American authorities, but gets nowhere with inquiries. Swift arranges for Hibbs to bring Aliya to his office, where they have sex, apparently for the first time, and Yassin, who has been getting progressively more religious, expresses displeasure at being in the company of "immoral women" like her.

Three months later, having got nowhere, Swift turns to Ferguson for help, and they argue, as Ferguson assumes that Sadiq must have done something to deserve being arrested, being no good just like "everybody in this country", bombing and killing each other over religion and tribal conflict. After Swift leaves, Ferguson eventually instructs Hibbs and a colleague to do a job for him; they protest that they should not go outside with fewer than six men, and he counters that work is drying up and they cannot afford to use more. Hibbs meets an Arab pair in the desert, who in exchange for money, hand over a hooded man, who Hibbs discovers is Sadiq. They return him to the hospital, and pay him off with compensation, insisting the incident was a case of mistaken identity.

As they leave, they drive into a demonstrating mob, and after grounding their car are forced to escape on foot as the mob turns on them. As Swift is in the British base, attempting to counsel his son who is not coping well with his first tour, he gets a message from Aliya, asking him to come to the hospital. On arriving, Sadiq reveals it was Ferguson who kidnapped him, and he urges Swift to go to the press to expose Pacific Solutions and to take Aliya out of Iraq, intimating that he knows of their affair, but believes that he "is finished" and that Swift is her best hope of safety. Lester returns to the Basra Pacific office, and is angry at Ferguson, blaming his erratic behaviour, bullying and forgery for losing a multimillion-dollar oil field deal. As they argue, Ferguson receives a call for help from Hibbs, who with his colleague are pinned down. Lester prepares to leave to help Hibbs, while urging Ferguson to take some responsibility for the situation. Ferguson responds by stating he will call the British Army in to rescue the pair, over objections from Lester, who states it would finish them in Iraq.

Richard Swift is a member of the patrol tasked to rescue Hibbs, but is separated from his unit and finds himself in an apartment block. He unsuccessfully attempts to radio for help, and then texts his father, who is in the hospital with Sadiq and Aliya; all three are by now helping the victims of the developing violence outside. As militia arrive, Yassin now among them, Swift is urged to leave by his translator. As Swift leaves, Aliya is pinned up against a wall and shot in the head by Yassin. Swift receives the text message from his son, and finds him dead in the apartment block.

Back in England, Ferguson, Hibbs and Swift are at Richard's funeral. The episode ends with the men in a bar afterwards, with Swift angry at Ferguson, blaming him for his son being there, fighting the guilt of having not got to him in time. Hibbs, having become a counsellor for returning servicemen, is prepared to aid Swift in "taking down" Ferguson and Lester with information about their dodgy dealings. Ferguson retaliates by stating that his new-found reason for risking his life in Iraq is money, in contrast to the lack of a reason while in the Army. Swift questions what has happened to him, to which he replies "I went to Iraq, why, what happened to you?". The episode ends poignantly as all three are left sitting in the bar, all close to tears.

== Cast ==
- James Nesbitt as Mike Swift
- Stephen Graham as Danny Ferguson
- Warren Brown as Lee Hibbs
- Nonso Anozie as Erik Lester
- Yigal Naor as Dr Sadiq Alasadi
- Lubna Azabal as Dr Aliya Nabil
- Omar Berdouni as Ahmed
- Monica Dolan as Nicky Swift
- Andrew-Paul Roberts as Richard Swift
- Lewis Alsamari as Yunis
- Fenar Mohammed-Ali as Yassin
- Greg Kelly as Spike
- John Prentice as John Prentice the 3rd of Lisburn Town

== Critical reception ==
Tim Walker of The Independent called Occupation "a predictably masterly production" but felt that its "bleak climax...stretched the bounds of plausibility". Writing for The Times, Caitlin Moran praised Nesbitt's performance as "surpringsly gripping". Helen Rumbelow, also from The Times, reviewed the first episode and felt the opening "a sequence of brilliant film-making" but criticised the acting from Nesbitt and Graham as "a touch too comedic".

The Telegraph felt the series gave "a poignant sense of the ironies" of the war in Iraq, praised writer Peter Bowker and summarised by calling the series "Truly excellent". Kathryn Flett wrote in The Guardian that "Nesbitt was very good and easy to like" but "not the film's star", feeling that performances by Stephen Graham and Warren Brown "made the deeper, more lasting impression". She also praised the writing as "thrilling - funny, sad, real, believable".
