= Ian Brown (director) =

British theatre director (born 1951)

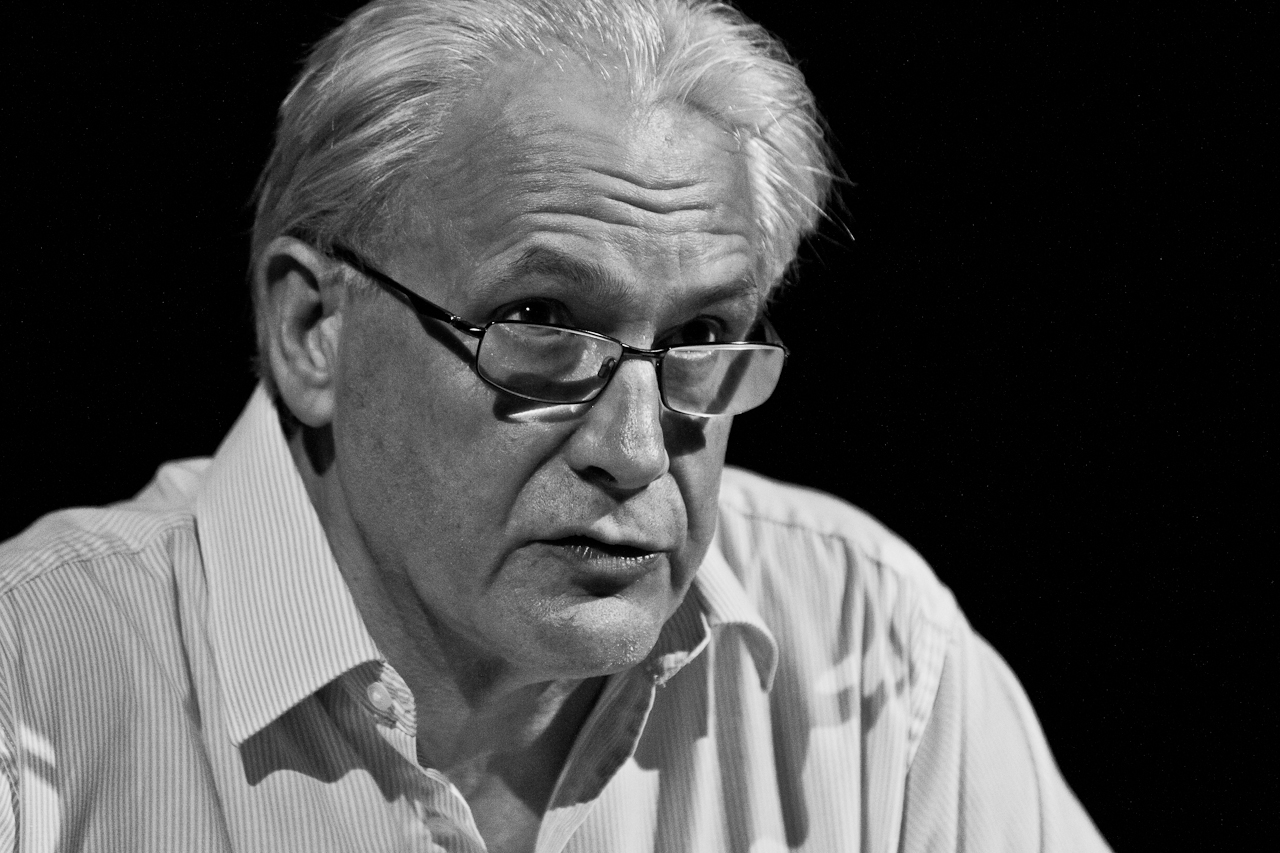
- Born: 8 March 1951 (age 75)
- Education: Royal Central School of Speech and Drama
- Occupation: Theatre director

Ian Brown (born 8 March 1951) is an artistic director and was chief executive of the West Yorkshire Playhouse in Leeds, West Yorkshire, England. He took up this post in 2002, succeeding Jude Kelly, and stood down in 2012. He was previously artistic director of the TAG Theatre Company in Glasgow (1984–1988) and the Traverse Theatre in Edinburgh (1988–1999). He trained at the Central School of Speech and Drama.
