= Owen Teale =

Welsh actor (born 1961)

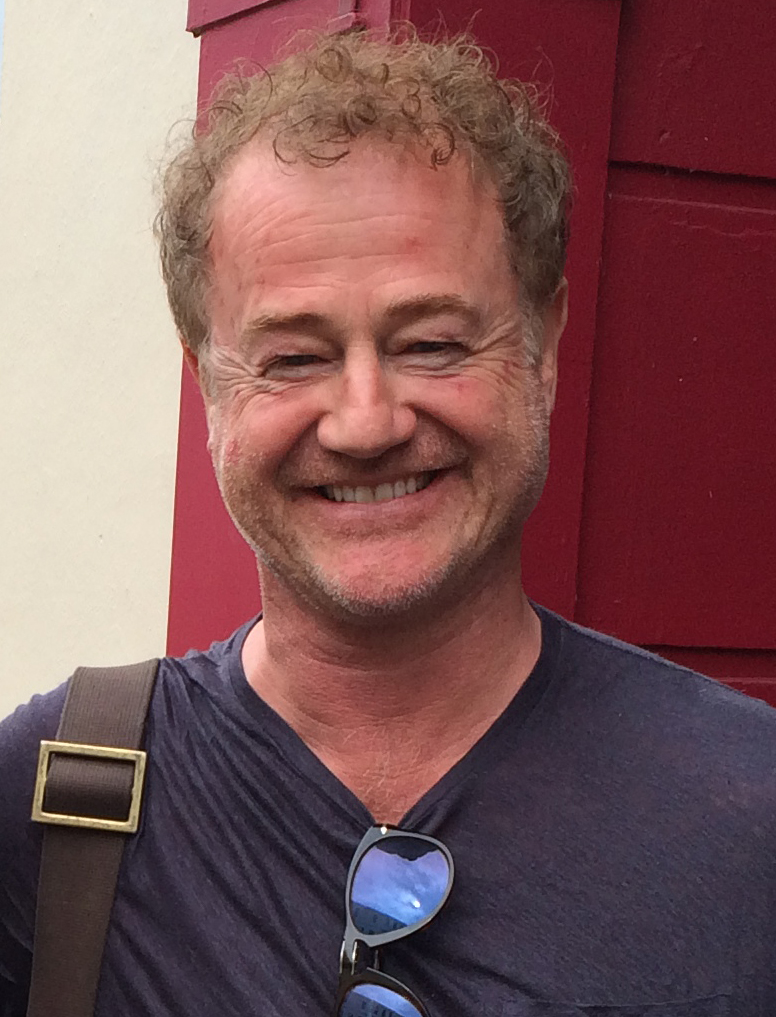
- Teale in 2014
- Born: 20 May 1961 (age 65); North Cornelly, Glamorgan, Wales
- Education: Guildford School of Acting
- Occupation: Actor
- Years active: 1984–present
- Spouses: Dilys Watling (m. 1986, divorced); Sylvestra Le Touzel (m. 2001)
- Children: 3

Owen Teale (born 20 May 1961) is a Welsh character actor having appeared in many films, including Robin Hood (1991), The Hawk (1993), King Arthur (2004), The Last Legion (2007), Tolkien (2019), and Dream Horse (2020). On television, he has appeared in Doctor Who (1985), David Copperfield (1986), The Thin Blue Line (1995), Ballykissangel (1999), Line of Duty (2012), Stella (2012–2013), A Discovery of Witches (2018–2022), The Rig (2023), and Sandokan (2025).

Teale is best known for his role as Ser Alliser Thorne in the HBO fantasy TV series Game of Thrones (2011–2016). In 1997, Teale won a Tony Award for his performance in a Broadway production of Henrik Ibsen's A Doll's House.

== Early life ==
Owen Teale was born on 20 May 1961, in North Cornelly, south Wales, son of Roy and Louise Teale. He attended Cynffig Comprehensive School in Kenfig Hill; he was suspended from the school for disciplinary offences, and credits one of the teachers Mr Davis, with awakening his interest in acting. He trained at the Guildford School of Acting. In 1997, Teale won a Tony Award for his performance in a Broadway production of Henrik Ibsen's A Doll's House.

== Career ==
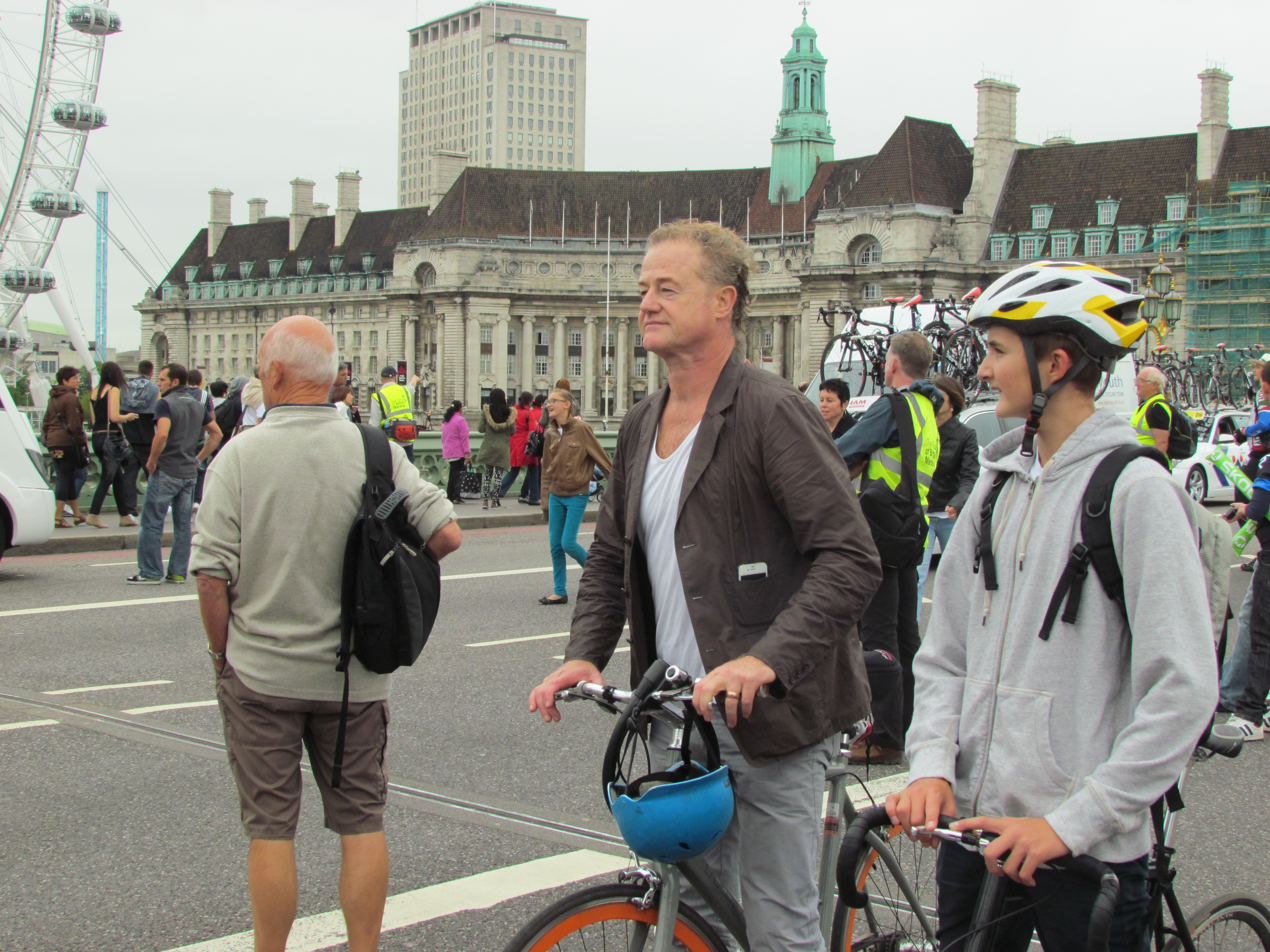
Teale in Whitehall, London, England in 2013

In 1984, Teale made his television debut in The Mimosa Boys a film about the Falklands War. In 1985, he appeared in the Doctor Who serial Vengeance on Varos as the dis-loyal guard Maldak who helps Peri escape. His film debut was in War Requiem in 1989. He later appeared in Knights of God (1989), Great Expectations (1989), The Fifteen Streets (1989) and Boon (1990) before being cast as Will Scarlet in the 1991 film Robin Hood.

He went on to appear in such series as Dangerfield, Ballykissangel, The Thin Blue Line and the long-running Belonging, and later Spooks and Murphy's Law.

He later appeared as Lophakin in the 1999 adaptation of The Cherry Orchard, opposite Charlotte Rampling as Ranevskaya and Alan Bates as Gayev. He played the infamous Nazi judge Roland Freisler in Conspiracy. He also had parts In Midsomer Murders and Lewis.

In 2005, he played a lead role in Marian, Again, in which he was the abusive husband of Kelly Harrison's eponymous character. He also did voice over narration for "Tales from the Green Valley", one of several farm series he has done for the BBC.

In 2006, he appeared in the Torchwood episode "Countrycide". Also in 2006 he had a role in the HBO UK TV movie Tsunami: The Aftermath. In 2007, he guest-starred in the Doctor Who audio drama The Mind's Eye. In the same year, he starred in The Last Legion alongside Ben Kingsley and Colin Firth, and was shot on location in Morocco, Tunisia and Slovakia.

In 2011, Teale appeared as Ser Alliser Thorne in Game of Thrones, the HBO TV adaptation of George R. R. Martin's novel series A Song of Ice and Fire, replacing at short notice Derek Halligan. He reprised this role in Season 4, Season 5, and Season 6.

In 2012, he played Dai in the comedy-drama series Stella, and Robert Holland, the fictional UK Foreign Secretary, in the drama series Kidnap and Ransom. He also played Chief Constable Osborne in the BBC police drama Line of Duty. Between 2018 and 2022 he played Peter Knox in A Discovery of Witches, a series based on the book of the same name by Deborah Harkness.

In 2020, he starred opposite Toni Collette and Damian Lewis in the Wales based sports comedy-drama film Dream Horse.

In 2023, Teale starred as Lars Hutton, causing problems on the Kinloch Bravo oil rig in The Rig, in a cast that included Iain Glen, Emily Hampshire, Mark Addy, and Martin Compston.

He has also worked as a voiceover artist for television advertisements.

== Personal life ==
In 1986, Teale married actress Dilys Watling, with whom he has a son, Ion. They divorced in the mid-1990s. In 2001, he married actress Sylvestra Le Touzel; they have two daughters, Eliza and Grace. He likes to play golf, and was made an honorary member of the Pyle and Kenfig Golf Club.

== Awards ==
Teale won the 1997 Tony Award for Best Featured Actor in a Play for his performance as Torvald opposite Janet McTeer in Ibsen's A Doll's House.

== Filmography ==
=== Films ===
Year	Title	Role	Director
1989	War Requiem	The Unknown Soldier	Derek Jarman
1991	Robin Hood	Will Scarlet	John Irvin
1993	The Hawk	Ken Marsh	David Hayman
1996	Marco Polo: The Missing Chapter	Adolph	Rafi Bukai
1999	The Cherry Orchard	Lopahin	Michael Cacoyannis
2001	The Search for John Gissing	Giles Hanagan	Mike Binder
2004	Jack Brown and the Curse of the Crown	Jack Brown	Andrew Gillman
2004	King Arthur	Pelagius	Antoine Fuqua
2007	The Last Legion	Vatrenus	Doug Lefler
2008	Inconceivable	Richard Newman	Mary McGuckian
2008	Love Me Forever	Peter Schwarz	Åsa Faringer & Ulf Hultberg
2009	It's Alive	Sgt. Perkins	Josef Rusnak
2011	Hunky Dory	Davy's Dad	Marc Evans
2013	The Fold	Edward Ashton	John Jencks
2016	Nocturne	Murray	Konstantinos Frangopoulos
2019	Tolkien	Headmaster Gilson	Dome Karukoski
2020	Dream Horse	Brian Vokes	Euros Lyn
2022	Save the Cinema	Darek	Sara Sugarman
2023	Caligula: The Ultimate Cut	Charea (voice)	Tinto Brass
2025	The Physician II	Godwin	Philipp Stölzl

=== Television ===
Year	Title	Role	Production	Notes
1985	Doctor Who	Maldak	BBC	Episodes: "Vengeance on Varos: Parts One and Two"
1985	The Mimosa Boys	Albie	BBC	Television film
1986	David Copperfield	Ham Peggotty	BBC	5 episodes
1987	One by One	PC Williams	BBC	Episode: "The Monkey in Between"
1987	Knights of God	Dai	ITV	5 episodes
1989	Great Expectations	Bentley Drummie	ITV	Mini-series; 2 episodes
1989	The Fifteen Streets	John O'Brien	ITV	Television film. Part of a collection of small-screen epics based on the best-selling books of Catherine Cookson
1990	Waterfront Beat	Det. Sgt. Mike McCarthy	BBC	8 episodes
1990	Boon	Philip Braithwaite	ITV	Episode: "Daddy's Girl"
1995	The Vacillations of Poppy Crew	Edmund Platt	ITV	Television film
1995	Dangerous Lady	Terry Patterson	ITV	Mini-series; 4 episodes
1995	The Thin Blue Line	Gary	BBC	Episode: "Fire and Terror"
1996	The Ruth Rendell Mysteries	Bob North	ITV	Episodes: "The Secret House of Death: Parts 1 and 2"
1996	Dangerfield	PC Dave Chapman	BBC	Episode: "Scars"
1996	Wilderness	Dan Somers	ITV	Mini-series; 3 episodes
1996	L'histoire du samedi	Alan	France 3	Episode: "La guerre des moutons"
1996	Death of a Salesman	Happy	BBC	Television film
1999	Cleopatra	Grattius	ABC	Mini-series; 2 episodes
1999	Ballykissangel	Connor Devlin	BBC	Series 5; 9 episodes
2000	The Real...	Inquisitor	ITV	Episode: "Joan of Arc"
2001	Beast	Mr. Head	BBC One	Episode: "Lamb"
2001	Conspiracy	Roland Freisler	HBO	Television film
2002	Ted and Alice	Barry Branch	BBC	Mini-series; 3 episodes
2002	Posh Plots	Himself - Narrator	BBC	Documentary series
2004	Judas	Flavius	ABC	Television film
2004	Island at War	PC Wilf Jonas	ITV	Mini-series; 6 episodes
2004	Spooks	Robert Morgan	BBC	Episode: "Frequently Asked Questions" (uncredited role)
2005	Midsomer Murders	Little Mal Kirby	ITV	Episode: "Second Sight"
2005	Timewatch	Erucius	BBC	Episode: "Murder in Rome"
2005	Tales from the Green Valley	Himself - Narrator	BBC Two	Documentary series; 12 episodes
2005	Murphy's Law	Paul Allison	BBC One	Series 3; 6 episodes
2005	DoNovAn	Ronnie Paxton	ITV	Series also known as DNA. Episode: #2.1
2005	Marian, Again	Bernie Sullivan	ITV	Television film
2006	Torchwood	Ewan Sherman	BBC	Episode: "Countrycide"
2006	Tsunami: The Aftermath	James Peabody	HBO	Mini-series; 2 episodes
2007	Lewis	Nicky Turnbull	ITV	Episode: "Old School Ties"
2007	The Last Detective	Tom Cornell	ITV	Episode: "The Dead Peasants Society"
2008	The Children	Peter	ITV	Mini-series; 3 episodes
2008	It's My Shout	Terry	ITV1 Wales	Episode: "Pleasure Park" (based on an original idea by Teale)
2011	Silk	Brian Frogett	BBC One	Episodes: "The Bitter End" and "Three Sheets to the Wind"
2011–2016	Game of Thrones	Alliser Thorne	HBO	Recurring role, 19 episodes
2012	Kidnap and Ransom	Robert Holland	ITV1	Series 2; 3 episodes
2012	The Hollow Crown	Captain Fluellen	BBC	Episode: "Henry V, Part 1"
2012, 2021	Line of Duty	Ch. Insp./Ch. Cons. Phillip Osborne	BBC	Series 1; 3 episodes / Series 6; 5 episodes
2012–2013	Stella	Dai Kosh	Sky 1	Series 1 and 2; 20 episodes
2015	River	Ch. Supt. Marcus McDonald	BBC One	Mini-series; 6 episodes
2016	Ripper Street	Felix Hackman	BBC Two	Episode: "Men of Iron, Men of Smoke"
2016	Houdini & Doyle	Professor Havensling	ITV	Mini-series; episode: "Strigoi"
2017	Pulse	Chad Berger	ABC TV	Mini-series; 8 episodes
2018–2022	A Discovery of Witches	Peter Knox	Sky 1	Series 1–3; 18 episodes
2019	Traitors	St. John Symonds	Channel 4	Episodes: "Feef" and "Hugh"
2019	Deep State	Hal Weaver	Fox	Series 2; 4 episodes
2021	The Pembrokeshire Murders	Gerard Elias QC	ITV1	Mini-series; 1 episode
2023	Wolf	Oliver Anchor-Ferrers	BBC One	6 episodes
2023–2025	The Rig	Lars Hutton	Amazon Prime Video	Series 1 and 2; 12 episodes
2025	The Revenge Club	Jim Eggleston	Paramount+	Mini-series; 3 episodes
2025	Sandokan	Anthony, Lord Guillonk	Rai 1	8 episodes
2026	Death Valley	Michael Mallowan	BBC One	Series 2; 3 episodes

=== Theatre ===
Year	Production	Role	Ref.
1996	A Doll's House	Torvald Helmer	
2003	The Dance of Death	Kurt	
2008	Macbeth	Macbeth	
2013	Passion Play	James	
2014	Under Milk Wood	Narrator	
2015	The Broken Heart	Bassanes	
2016	No Man's Land	Briggs	
2016	Gaslight	Jack Manningham	
2022	A Christmas Carol	Ebenezer Scrooge	
2023	A Christmas Carol	Ebenezer Scrooge	
