= The Hour (2011 TV series) =

2011–2012 British drama series that aired on BBC

- Genre: Period drama
- Created by: Abi Morgan
- Written by: Abi Morgan
- Starring: Dominic West; Romola Garai; Ben Whishaw; Anton Lesser; Julian Rhind-Tutt; Anna Chancellor; Joshua McGuire; Lisa Greenwood; Oona Chaplin; Vanessa Kirby; Peter Capaldi; Hannah Tointon; Tom Burke; Peter Sullivan
- Composer: Daniel Giorgetti
- Country of origin: United Kingdom
- No. of series: 2
- No. of episodes: 12

Production
- Executive producers: Jane Featherstone; Derek Wax; Abi Morgan; Lucy Richer
- Producer: Ruth Kenley-Letts
- Editors: Gareth C. Scales; Xavier Russell; Nick Arthurs; Paul Machliss
- Running time: 59 minutes
- Production company: Kudos Film and Television

Original release
- Network: BBC Two, BBC Two HD
- Release: 19 July 2011 – 13 December 2012

The Hour is a British television drama series broadcast on BBC. The series was centred on a fictional current-affairs show being launched by the World Service in June 1956, at the time of the Hungarian Revolution and Suez Crisis. It stars Ben Whishaw, Dominic West, and Romola Garai, with a supporting cast including Tim Pigott-Smith, Juliet Stevenson, Burn Gorman, Anton Lesser, Anna Chancellor, Julian Rhind-Tutt, and Oona Chaplin. It was written by Abi Morgan (also one of the executive producers, alongside Jane Featherstone and Derek Wax).

The series premiered on BBC Two and BBC Two HD on 19 July 2011 each Tuesday at 9 pm. Each episode lasts 60 minutes, with Ruth Kenley-Letts as producer and Coky Giedroyc as lead director. It was commissioned by Janice Hadlow, Controller, BBC Two, and Ben Stephenson, Controller, BBC Drama Commissioning and produced by Kudos Film and Television. Hornsey Town Hall was used for much of the filming.

Following the airing of the final episode of the first series, it was announced that a second series had been commissioned, which was co-produced by American network BBC America. It premiered on 14 November 2012 in the UK and on 28 November 2012 in the United States. On 12 February 2013, it was announced by the BBC that the series would not continue.

== Cast ==
- Romola Garai as Isabel (Bel) Rowley, producer of The Hour
- Ben Whishaw as Frederick (Freddie) Lyon, journalist and co-presenter of The Hour
- Dominic West as Hector Madden, co-presenter of The Hour
- Anton Lesser as Clarence Fendley (series 1)
- Julian Rhind-Tutt as Angus McCain, press liaison, Head of Press, for Prime Minister
- Joshua McGuire as Isaac Wengrow
- Lisa Greenwood as Sissy Cooper
- Anna Chancellor as Lix Storm, journalist and head of the foreign desk of The Hour
- Oona Chaplin as Marnie Madden, wife of Hector Madden
- Burn Gorman as Thomas Kish (series 1)
- Juliet Stevenson as Lady Elms (series 1)
- Tim Pigott-Smith as Lord Elms (series 1)
- Vanessa Kirby as Ruth Elms (series 1)
- Andrew Scott as Adam Le Ray (series 1)
- Adetomiwa Edun as Sey Ola, boyfriend of Sissy Cooper and a doctor
- Hannah Tointon as Kiki Delaine (series 2)
- Tom Burke as Bill Kendall (series 2)
- Peter Capaldi as Randall Brown (series 2), Head of News for The Hour
- Lizzie Brocheré as Camille Mettier (series 2)
- Morgan Watkins as Norman Pike (series 2)
- Peter Sullivan as Commander Laurence Stern (series 2)

== Plot ==
=== Series one ===
In the autumn of 1956, Freddie Lyon (Ben Whishaw) is a reporter unhappy with his job producing newsreels for the BBC. Desperate to get onto television, which he feels offers greater immediacy, Freddie is unaware that his best friend Bel Rowley (Romola Garai) has been selected by their mentor Clarence Fendley (Anton Lesser) to produce a new news magazine, the eponymous "The Hour". Rowley selects experienced war correspondent Lix Storm (Anna Chancellor) to head the foreign desk for the programme, leaving Freddie to run domestic news, a position which he considers inferior. For anchor of the programme, Clarence selects the handsome and patrician Hector Madden (Dominic West). They are joined by Thomas Kish (Burn Gorman), a mysterious and taciturn translator for the BBC who helps them cover the developing Suez Crisis.

As the team struggles to put the show together, Freddie is approached by Ruth Elms, the daughter of a member of the House of Lords who had employed Freddie's mother. She asks him to look into the murder of Peter Darrall (Jamie Parker), a college professor whom she knew. Soon after, Freddie finds her dead in her hotel room, an apparent suicide.

As the Suez Crisis escalates, the production team strives to report on British involvement in the crisis, despite pressure from the administration and in particular Angus McCain (Julian Rhind-Tutt) to present a sanitised narrative for the public. Freddie becomes more and more convinced that Peter Darrall and Ruth Elms were killed for some sinister reason. He discovers a secret message that Darrall tried to pass on before he was murdered: "Revert to Brightstone" and finds a movie reel depicting Ruth, Darrall, and Thomas Kish on holiday together. When confronted, Kish intimates that the government is behind the murder of Darrall and Elms, but he kills himself after a struggle with Freddie before the latter can learn more. Bel begins an affair with Hector. Hector's wife, Marnie (Oona Castilla Chaplin) finds out, telling Bel that she wasn't the first woman to have been with him since they married. After Clarence tells Bel that the affair threatens to ruin her career and damage the show, she calls it off.

As the Suez Crisis flares into armed conflict, Freddie learns that Darrall had been a communist spy and had been involved in a program to recruit bright and susceptible young people, referred to as "Bright Stones" to the Soviet cause. Ruth had been one of these Bright Stones and Kish had been sent by MI6 to keep tabs on them. Freddie also discovers that he is marked as a "Bright Stone". As British troops move to seize the Suez Canal, Freddie does a live interview of Lord Elms, Ruth's father, who denounces the government. However, as the interview goes out Clarence, at the insistence of higher-ups in the government, orders it to be taken off air halfway through the show. Bel is then fired by the BBC and Freddie confronts Clarence, who tells him that he had put him on the Bright Stone list, and that he is a Communist spy. He then tells Freddie to run this information as a news story. Freddie leaves the studio with Bel, telling her that they have a story to write.

=== Series two ===
The second series takes place in 1957. A new Head of BBC News, Randall Brown (Peter Capaldi) has taken over, to whom Bel must report while attempting to prevent the programme's now famous and increasingly dissolute presenter Hector Madden from defecting to rival ITV. Freddie, having spent time in France and married a French woman, Camille, is taken back as a co-presenter to the fury of Hector. In trying to hold on to Hector, Bel becomes involved with the ITV magazine producer Bill Kendall. Two big issues dominate the series and join: vice in London's Soho and the nuclear race.

Despite marital problems, Hector frequents a Soho nightclub run by Raphael Cilenti, El Paradis, whose leading dancer is Kiki Delaine. During a party hosted by Hector and his wife Marnie at their apartment, two policemen arrive to arrest Hector on suspicion of beating up Kiki, which Hector denies. Marnie leaves Hector at the police station and spends the night alone before auditioning for a cookery show. She finally goes to bring him home, but is now determined not to endure his extra-marital affairs, telling him their marriage is now for appearances only. Freddie and Bel pursue the story about the attack on Kiki.

Racial tension is on the rise across London, following the arrival of Commonwealth immigrants, and Freddie is keen to feature the issue. He decides to interview a fascist, Trevor, on the same day that board members come to the studio. Camille suffers xenophobic abuse from fascists. Bel meanwhile decides that The Hour will run on the Wolfenden Report, but she finds it impossible to get participants.

Show-girl Rosa-Maria visits Bel to tell her that Kiki has disappeared; Hector calls Laurie for help, unaware that he has contacted the person who assaulted her. Freddie is sure that he is on track to uncovering the truth about Kiki, despite a warning from Commander Laurence Stern to stay away from the story. An argument with McCain leads to a drunken Hector being escorted home by Stern. Hector then begins to recall an incident from their military past which throws doubt on his friend's character.

Freddie and Bel continue their search for Kiki; they pitch the exposé of Cilenti's criminal activities coupled with anti-nuclear policy, but Randall challenges them to get sources to show that the first story is ready. Bel meets Rosa-Maria, who puts herself in danger, and reveals how Cilenti has power over some of the country's most influential leaders. Meanwhile, Randall and Lix, who had worked together in Spain during the civil war, grow closer over their adopted daughter.

Bel continues her relationship with Bill, to the annoyance of Freddie, who is soon abandoned by Camille. Photos from a recent NATO summit contain a face which Freddie deduces forms the connection between Cilenti and the nuclear stories. Bel's source is murdered. Shaken, she tries to stop the pursuit of the Cilenti story. Freddie and Hector, however, follow the story further to establishment corruption involving a mystery company aiming to profit from nuclear bases. Finally Hector's face hits the tabloids in connection with the vice scandal, making it more difficult for The Hour to cover such a major conspiracy. Freddie's determination to follow the story to the very end puts him in mortal danger.

== Episodes ==
=== Series 1 (2011) ===
No. overall	No. in series	Title	Directed by	Written by	Original release date	UK viewers (millions)
1	1	"Episode 1"	Coky Giedroyc	Abi Morgan	19 July 2011	2.99
2	2	"Episode 2"	Coky Giedroyc	Abi Morgan	26 July 2011	2.02
3	3	"Episode 3"	Harry Bradbeer	Abi Morgan	2 August 2011	1.92
4	4	"Episode 4"	Harry Bradbeer	Abi Morgan	9 August 2011	1.86
5	5	"Episode 5"	Jamie Payne	Abi Morgan	16 August 2011	1.67
6	6	"Episode 6"	Jamie Payne	Abi Morgan	23 August 2011	1.86

=== Series 2 (2012) ===
No. overall	No. in series	Title	Directed by	Written by	Original release date	UK viewers (millions)
7	1	"Episode 1"	Sandra Goldbacher	Abi Morgan	14 November 2012	1.68
8	2	"Episode 2"	Sandra Goldbacher	Abi Morgan	21 November 2012	1.12 (Overnight)
9	3	"Episode 3"	Catherine Morshead	Nicole Taylor	28 November 2012	1.06 (Overnight)
10	4	"Episode 4"	Catherine Morshead	George Kay	5 December 2012	1.27
11	5	"Episode 5"	Jamie Payne	Abi Morgan	12 December 2012	1.14 (Overnight)
12	6	"Episode 6"	Jamie Payne	Abi Morgan	13 December 2012	1.17 (Overnight)

== Cancellation ==
The show was officially cancelled by the BBC on 12 February 2013. The BBC commented: "We loved the show but have to make hard choices to bring new shows through." It was commented that while the show had received good reviews, its viewing figures were low and therefore a third series was not merited. The second series only managed to muster an average of 1.24 million viewers per episode, compared to the first series which managed an average of 2.02 million. For BBC2, primetime shows normally require an average audience of at least 1.75 million to be recommissioned. Producers commented that they were upset to see the show cancelled, as they had plans for a third series. On 18 April 2018, The Hour writer Abi Morgan revealed in an interview with RadioTimes that she was trying to resurrect the series for a third series set in 1960s London. The Hour's Executive producer Jane Featherstone also said that she would be keen to revive the show.

== Reception ==
Critical reception of the first episode was mixed, with Sam Wollaston of The Guardian expressing scepticism over a popular comparison with Mad Men, calling the episode a "slower starter" and "a bit of hotchpotch – Drop the Dead Donkey meets Spooks", but overall stating that "there's enough intrigue there to whet the appetite for more". However, AA Gill in The Sunday Times called it "Self satisfied guff" with "a script that would shame a Bruce Willis movie", and Michael Deacon of The Telegraph criticised it as "an exercise in upbraiding the past for failing to live up to the politically correct ideals of the 21st century", although he praised Morgan's writing and concluded by stating "I wouldn't want to give up on The Hour too soon". Even so, there were some criticisms of the script as being riddled with anachronisms, with the show's writer Abi Morgan admitting some lines "haven't worked".

The show was well received in its American premiere on BBC America, receiving an 81 on Metacritic, indicating "Universal Acclaim". Reviewing it for The New Yorker magazine, Nancy Franklin wrote that it is "almost absurdly gratifying. With its casting, its look, its unfolding mysteries, its attention to important historical events, its sexiness, The Hour hits every pleasure center." In the full printed version of the same article, she adds "[It is] as if it were a space containing chocolate, gold, a book you've always wanted to read, your favorite music, and the love of your life, who desires you unceasingly." Mary McNamara in the Los Angeles Times writes that the second season "improves its already stellar cast and grows in sophistication", and notes that, during its first season, "critics were divided – mostly by the Atlantic." Alyssa Rosenberg wrote in The Atlantic: "The Hour is not the British Mad Men: it's better."

Founder member of ITN Lynne Reid Banks criticised the series for putting a more recent modus operandi into the 1950s.

== Awards and nominations ==
The series has been nominated for four Golden Globe Awards and four BAFTAs.

Awards and nominations
Award	Category	Recipients	Outcome
64th Primetime Emmy Awards	Outstanding Writing for a Miniseries, Movie or a Dramatic Special	Abi Morgan	Nominated
69th Golden Globe Awards	Best Miniseries or Television Film		Nominated
69th Golden Globe Awards	Best Actor – Miniseries or Television Film	Dominic West	Nominated
69th Golden Globe Awards	Best Actress – Miniseries or Television Film	Romola Garai	Nominated
Art Directors Guild Award	Art Directors Guild Award for Best Production Design – Miniseries or TV Film	Eve Stewart (production designer), Leon McCarthy (art director), Beverley Gerard (art director), Amy Merry (graphic designer), Heather Gordon (assistant graphic designer), Julia Castle (set decorator)	Nominated
1st PAAFTJ Television Awards	Best Miniseries or TV movie	Ruth Kenley-Letts, Jane Featherstone, Abi Morgan, Noelle Morris, Lucy Richer, Patrick Schweitzer, Derek Wax, Cahal Bannon, Producers (BBC)	Nominated
1st PAAFTJ Television Awards	Best Writing for a Miniseries or TV movie	Abi Morgan	Nominated
1st PAAFTJ Television Awards	Best Production Design in a Miniseries or TV movie	Eve Stewart	Nominated
1st PAAFTJ Television Awards	Best Editing in a Miniseries or TV movie	Gareth C. Scales & Xavier Russell & Nick Arthurs & Paul Machliss	Nominated
1st PAAFTJ Television Awards	Best Main Title Theme Music		Nominated
1st PAAFTJ Television Awards	Best Main Title Design		Nominated
2012 British Academy Television Awards	Best Photography and Lighting: Fiction	Chris Seager	Nominated
2012 British Academy Television Awards	Best Sound (Fiction/Entertainment)	Jamie Caple (dialogue editor); Rudi Buckle (production sound mixer); Nigel Squibbs (re-recording mixer); Marc Lawes (sound effects editor)	Nominated
2012 British Academy Television Awards	Best Sound: Fiction	Marc Lawes; Nigel Squibbs; Rudi Buckle; Jamie Caple	Nominated
2012 British Academy Television Awards	Best Supporting Actress	Anna Chancellor	Nominated
Broadcasting Press Guild Awards	Best Actor	Dominic West	Won
Broadcasting Press Guild Awards	Best Actress	Romola Garai	Nominated
Broadcasting Press Guild Awards	Best Drama Series	Abi Morgan	Nominated
Broadcasting Press Guild Awards	Writer's Award	Abi Morgan	Nominated
2nd Critics' Choice Television Awards	Best Movie/Miniseries		Nominated
2nd Critics' Choice Television Awards	Best Actor in a Miniseries or TV Movie	Dominic West	Nominated
70th Golden Globe Awards	Best Miniseries or Television Film		Nominated
2013 British Academy Television Awards	Best Supporting Actor	Peter Capaldi	Nominated
2013 British Academy Television Awards	Best Sound: Fiction	Nigel Squibbs (re recording mixer); Marc Lawes (sound fx editor); John Mooney (production sound mixer); Jamie Caple (Dialogue Editor)	Nominated
2013 British Academy Television Awards	Best Original Television Music	Kevin Sargent	Nominated
2013 British Academy Television Awards	Best Editing	Gareth C. Scales	Nominated
2013 British Academy Television Awards	Best Production Design	Eve Stewart	Nominated
3rd Critics' Choice Television Awards	Best Movie/Miniseries		Nominated
3rd Critics' Choice Television Awards	Best Actor in a Miniseries or TV Movie	Dominic West	Nominated
3rd Critics' Choice Television Awards	Best Actress in a Miniseries or TV Movie	Romola Garai	Nominated
65th Primetime Emmy Awards	Outstanding Writing for a Miniseries, Movie or a Dramatic Special	Abi Morgan	Won
65th Primetime Emmy Awards	Outstanding Casting for a Miniseries, Movie, or a Special	Jill Trevellick	Nominated

== Broadcast ==
In the United States, this programme commenced screening on BBC America from 17 August 2011 each Wednesday at 10 pm E/P (9pm C). The programme commenced screening in Australia on ABC1 from 21 November 2011 each Monday at 8:30 pm, with episode one and two combined into a première movie-length airing. In Canada, this programme became available through Netflix in January 2012. In South Africa, this series has been acquired by M-Net to screen from 25 December 2012 at 8.30PM .

Kudos Film and Television produced a four-DVD set of the complete two BBC series (with a 15 age certificate), along with 'extras' such as features behind the scenes and the art design of the programmes, and with interviews with members of the cast, in 2012.
