= Tsunami: The Aftermath =

2006 American TV disaster drama

- Tsunami: The Aftermath poster
- Based on: 2004 Indian Ocean earthquake and tsunami
- Written by: Abi Morgan
- Directed by: Bharat Nalluri
- Starring: Tim Roth; Chiwetel Ejiofor; Sophie Okonedo; Hugh Bonneville; Samrit Machielsen; Toni Collette
- Theme music composer: Alex Heffes
- Countries of origin: United States; United Kingdom
- Original language: English
- No. of episodes: 2

Production
- Producer: Finola Dwyer
- Cinematography: John de Borman
- Editor: Barney Pilling
- Production company: HBO Films

Original release
- Release: November 28 – December 5, 2006

Tsunami: The Aftermath is a 2006 American disaster drama television miniseries that dramatizes the events in the aftermath of the 2004 Indian Ocean earthquake and tsunami.

The miniseries was written by Abi Morgan and directed by Bharat Nalluri. It is a joint production of HBO and the BBC and stars Tim Roth, Chiwetel Ejiofor, Sophie Okonedo, Hugh Bonneville, Samrit Machielsen and Toni Collette. It was filmed in Phuket and Khao Lak, Thailand from April to June 2006. Phuket and Khao Lak were two of the worst hit areas in Thailand in the disaster.

== Plot ==
Interweaving stories examine the personal tragedies of several characters. Ian and Susie Carter are a young English couple searching for their six-year-old daughter Martha who was swept away by the tsunami. At the same time, Englishwoman Kim Peabody and her son Adam are looking for James (Kim's husband and Adam's father) and John (Kim's son and Adam's older brother). Meanwhile Than, a Thai waiter, has to cope with the loss of his family and village.

Apart from these survivors, there are several officials trying to cope with the situation. There is Tony Whittaker, an overwhelmed British consular official whose faith in the powers of bureaucracy is severely tested. Kathy Graham, an Australian aid worker for a Christian charity, tries to convince Whittaker to show a healthy contempt for the rules and try to help the people as best as he can. And, there is Nick Fraser, a journalist who is investigating the lack of prior warning and corruption following the disaster.

== Cast ==
The Journalists

- Tim Roth as Nick Fraser
- Will Yun Lee as Chai
- Aure Atika as Simone
- Kate Ashfield as Ellen Webb

The Carters

- Chiwetel Ejiofor as Ian Carter
- Sophie Okonedo as Susie Carter
- Jazmyn Maraso as Martha Carter
- Savannah Loney as Eve, Martha's lookalike
- Jacek Koman as Peer, the Dutch doctor

The Diplomats

- Hugh Bonneville as Tony Whittaker
- Toni Collette as Kathy Graham
- Leon Ford as Joe Meddler, Whittaker's assistant

The Thai

- Samrit Machielsen as Than
- Poh Sursakul as Than's Grandmother
- Grirggiat Punpiputt as Dr. Pravat Meeko
- Glacian Jarusomboon as Dr. Boomers Potuk

The Peabodys

- Gina McKee as Kim Peabody
- George MacKay as Adam Peabody
- Morgan David Jones as John David Peabody
- Owen Teale as James Robert Peabody

== Awards ==
59th Primetime Emmy Awards nominations

- Outstanding Supporting Actress in a Miniseries or Movie (Toni Collette)
- Outstanding Director for a Miniseries, Movie, or Dramatic Special (Bharat Nalluri)
- Outstanding Sound Editing for a Miniseries, Movie, or Special

64th Golden Globe Awards nominations

- Best Actor in a Miniseries or TV Film (Chiwetel Ejiofor)
- Best Actress in a Miniseries or TV Film (Sophie Okonedo)
- Best Supporting Actress in a Series, Miniseries, or TV Film (Toni Collette)

Golden Nymph Awards Awards nominations

- Best Actor in a Miniseries (Chiwetel Ejiofor) (won)
- Best Actor in a Miniseries (Hugh Bonneville)
- Best Actor in a Miniseries (Tim Roth)
- Best Actress in a Miniseries (Toni Collette)

38th NAACP Image Awards nominations

- Best Miniseries, TV Film, or Dramatic Special
- Best Actor in a Miniseries, TV Film, or Dramatic Special (Chiwetel Ejiofor)
- Best Actress in a Miniseries, TV Film, or Dramatic Special (Sophie Okonedo) (won)

British Academy Television Awards nominations

- Best Sound Fiction/Entertainment (won)
- Best Original Television Music (Alex Heffes)
- Best Photography & Lighting Fiction/Entertainment (John de Borman)

Humanitas Prize

- 90 Minute Category (Abi Morgan)

== Controversy ==
The filming used actual locations in Thailand that were devastated by the tsunami. Some victims and grief counselors protested the film, saying that it was too soon after the disaster and that the scenes depicting the tragedy could prove too traumatic. Others welcomed the production, saying it brought jobs and could actually help the healing process and raise awareness of the impact of the tsunami. There was also concern over the lack of focus on the Asian victims of the flood.
