= Abi Morgan =

Welsh playwright and screenwriter

Abi Morgan OBE
- Born: Abigail Louise Morgan; 1968 (age 57–58); Cardiff, Wales
- Occupation: Screenwriter
- Spouse: Jacob Krichefski
- Children: 2
- Writing career
- Period: 1998–present
- Genre: Drama
- Notable works: Sex Traffic, Brick Lane, The Hour, The Iron Lady, Shame, Suffragette

Abigail Louise Morgan OBE (born December 1968) is a Welsh playwright and screenwriter known for her works for television, such as Sex Traffic and The Hour, and the films Brick Lane, The Iron Lady, Shame and Suffragette.

== Early life and education ==
Abigail Louise Morgan was born in Cardiff, Wales, in December 1968. She is the daughter of actress Pat England and theatre director Gareth Morgan, who was director of the Gulbenkian Theatre in Newcastle upon Tyne (now the Northern Stage). Her parents divorced when she was a teenager. As a child, she frequently moved around the country with her mother because of the latter's career in repertory theatre. She attended seven separate schools during her childhood.

After initial ambitions to become an actress, Morgan decided to become a writer when she was reading drama and literature at Exeter University. She took a postgraduate writing course at the Central School of Speech and Drama.

== Writing career ==
=== Theatre ===
Having not dared to show any of her writing "to anyone for five years", she gained her first professional stage credit in 1998 with Skinned, produced at the Nuffield Theatre, Southampton. She has written plays for the Royal Exchange Studio Theatre Manchester, the Royal Lyceum Theatre, the Traverse Theatre, Edinburgh, the National Theatre of Scotland, and the Royal Court, London.

Her 2001 play Tender, commissioned by Birmingham Rep Theatre and co-produced with the Hampstead Theatre, gained her a nomination as "most promising playwright" at the 2002 Laurence Olivier Theatre Awards.

=== Television ===
Morgan gained her first television writing credit in 1998 on the continuing ITV drama series Peak Practice, following that with a television play My Fragile Heart (2000) and a BBC2 drama Murder in 2002, starring Julie Walters.

She was commissioned to write the single drama Sex Traffic for Channel 4 in 2004, about a teenage girl trafficked from the Balkans to Britain. This drama, directed by David Yates, won the 2005 BAFTA award for Best Drama Serial. She has since written a number of single dramas for television including Tsunami: The Aftermath (2006), White Girl, part of White (2008) and Royal Wedding (2010), which follows the 1981 Royal Wedding through the perspective of events held in a small Welsh mining village. Her television work also includes writing Birdsong, a two-part television adaptation of Sebastian Faulks's novel of the same title.

Morgan's first continuing drama series was The Hour (2011), set in a BBC newsroom during the 1956 Suez Crisis. It was commissioned for a second series, but cancelled after the second series was transmitted. The second series had lower ratings, although it was praised by critics. In 2013, she won the Primetime Emmy Award for Outstanding Writing for a Miniseries, Movie, or Dramatic Special for The Hour; she had been nominated for that same award in 2012, after the first series.

Morgan wrote the legal drama The Split, about the private and professional lives of divorce lawyers, first shown on BBC1 in April 2018.

She wrote the script for the 2024 Netflix miniseries Eric, starring Benedict Cumberbatch.

=== Film ===
Morgan has also written for cinema. Her 2007 adaptation of Monica Ali's novel Brick Lane was critically acclaimed, but created controversy – some Brick Lane Bengalis labelled the film "defamatory" and a planned royal film performance was cancelled. Her next film was The Iron Lady, which starred Meryl Streep as Margaret Thatcher, closely followed by a smaller-budget production, Shame, co-written with Steve McQueen.

Her work on The Iron Lady earned her a BAFTA Award for Best Original Screenplay nomination, while her work on Shame earned her a BAFTA Award for Outstanding British Film nomination. She has said that she always puts one line from her last film in her next film.

Her next film, The Invisible Woman, was an adaptation of the book of the same name by Claire Tomalin, about the secret love affair between Charles Dickens and Nelly Ternan, which lasted for thirteen years until his death in 1870. The film was released to critical acclaim in 2013, but its production was reportedly strained after clashes between lead actress Kristin Scott Thomas and Morgan on set, the source of which was never disclosed.

A staunch opponent of Brexit, Morgan was one of nine leading playwrights to contribute to a series of online dramas in 2017 responding to the causes and consequences of the EU referendum result. Entitled Brexit Shorts, Morgan's monologue, The End, starred Penelope Wilton as a woman on the brink as she faces the consequences of the end of her 43-year-old marriage.

=== Non-fiction ===
In May 2022, Morgan released a memoir entitled This Is Not a Pity Memoir, in which she discusses her husband's battle with encephalitis and Capgras delusion.

== Personal life ==
In 2015 Morgan was living in the north London neighbourhood of Stroud Green in Haringey with her husband, actor Jacob Krichefski.

In January 2020, Morgan said that she was recovering from breast cancer. She had chemotherapy and a mastectomy.

In 2011 her sister was the fundraiser at London's Unicorn Theatre.

== Recognition ==
Morgan was appointed Officer of the Order of the British Empire (OBE) in the 2018 Birthday Honours, "For services to Theatre and Screenwriting".

== Selected works ==
=== Plays ===
- Skinned (1997)
- Sleeping Around (1998) – co-written with Mark Ravenhill, Stephen Greenhorn and Hilary Fannin
- Fast Food (1999)
- Splendour (2000)
- Tiny Dynamite (2001)
- Tender (2001)
- Monster Mum (2005)
- Fugee (2008)
- Chain Play – Production II – co-written with Neil LaBute, Mike Poulton and Tanya Ronder
- The Night is Darkest Before the Dawn (2009), as part of The Great Game: Afghanistan
- Lovesong (2011)
- 27 (2011)
- The Mistress Contract (2014)
- The End (2017)

=== Film screenplays ===
- Brick Lane (2007)
- The Iron Lady (2011)
- Shame (2011)
- The Invisible Woman (2013)
- Suffragette (2015)
- Bridget Jones: Mad About the Boy (2025)

=== Television ===
- My Fragile Heart (2000)
- Murder (2002)
- Sex Traffic (2004)
- Tsunami: The Aftermath (2006)
- White Girl, part of White (2008) – with Hettie Macdonald, won the TV Spielfilm Award at the Cologne Conference
- Royal Wedding (2010)
- The Hour (2011)
- Birdsong (2012)
- River (2015)
- The Split (2018, 2020, 2022, 2024)
- Eric (2024)
- The Split Up (2026–present) – with Ursula Rani Sarma

=== Books ===
- Morgan, Abi (2022). This is Not a Pity Memoir. London: John Murray Press. ISBN 978-1-5293-8833-6. OCLC 1313596963.
