= Kelly Adams =

English actress (born 1979)

- Born: Kelly Diane Adams; 16 October 1979 (age 46); Lincoln, Lincolnshire, England
- Education: Mountview Academy of Theatre Arts
- Occupation: Actress
- Years active: 2002–present
- Spouse: Chris Kennedy (m. 2011)

Kelly Diane Adams (born 16 October 1979) is an English actress. She has played leading roles in a number of British television series: Mickie Hendrie in the BBC One medical drama series Holby City (2004–2006) and Casualty (2005); Emma Kennedy in the BBC One drama series Hustle (2009–2012); Padre Mary Greenstock in the BBC Three comedy drama series Bluestone 42 (2013–2014); Nancy Webb in the ITV period drama series Mr Selfridge (2015); and Michelle Charr in the BBC daytime murder/police drama series London Kills (2020).

== Career ==
Adams was born in Lincoln, Lincolnshire. A pupil of North Kesteven School in North Hykeham, Adams trained at the Mountview Academy of Theatre Arts in Wood Green, London.

Initially playing Tara Palmer-Tomkinson in a docu-soap about Prince William, she later appeared in Doctors before playing Mickie Hendrie in Holby City from 2004 to 2006. Adams was cast in the role of Mickie alongside fellow series six newcomer Jaye Jacobs, who was cast as staff nurse Donna Jackson. The pair's arrival in the show was heavily publicised and the subject of a documentary entitled Making It at Holby, chronicling their casting process, which entailed seven weeks of auditions, including group workshops to allow the series producers to gauge candidates' personalities.

Adams originally auditioned as Donna. However, the casting directors felt that she would be better suited to Mickie, the quieter character and "mild mannered" counterpart to Donna's "sassy staff nurse". She and Jacobs were paired together during a three-hour workshop, and the producers detected an "instant spark" between them, leading to their dual casting. In 2004, her character had a lesbian liaison with Jacobs' character. The scene in which they kissed was edited to half its original length after being deemed too explicit for pre-watershed broadcast. In the aftermath of the Mickie/Donna storyline, the BBC banned its actresses from appearing in raunchy photo-shoots, after Jacobs and Adams were photographed in intimate poses while dressed in nurse's uniforms for various "lads' mags". In 2006, her ambitious character left for Newcastle Medical school to study to be a doctor.

Adams subsequently appeared as the servant Eve in the Robin Hood episode "A Thing or Two About Loyalty".

In 2009, Adams joined the cast of long-running BBC1 drama series Hustle for its fifth season, playing the role of Emma Kennedy, a new member of Mickey Bricks' crew of con artists. She continued in the role of Emma for three further seasons of the drama. In an episode of Series 6, Adams plays the role of Kylie Minogue as a parody of Adams' resemblance to the Australian singer. In real life, Adams has been mistaken for Minogue.

She had a small role in the 2009 biographical film Bronson, about the prisoner Charles Bronson, and appeared in the British science fiction thriller Beacon77 in 2009 and as Wendy in My Last Five Girlfriends in 2010.

Adams appeared in the second series of Death in Paradise, shown on the BBC in early 2013. She then starred as Padre Mary Greenstock in the BBC Three comedy Bluestone 42 for its first two series.

In 2015 she played Nancy Webb in the third instalment of the ITV period drama series Mr Selfridge, and in 2020 Michelle Charr in the second series of the BBC daytime murder/police drama series London Kills.

== Personal life ==
Adams married fashion photographer Chris Kennedy in 2011.

== Filmography ==
=== Films ===
Year	Title	Role	Notes
2008	Bronson	Irene Peterson	
2009	The Boxer	Natalie	
2009	My Last Five Girlfriends	Wendy	
2009	The 7th Dimension	Sarah	Original title: "Beacon77"
2012	2 in a Million	Neema	Short film
2013	Tomorrow in a Day	Rose	Short film
2019	Huntington Gardens	Mrs. Morris	Short film

=== Television ===
Year	Title	Role	Notes
2002	Prince William	Tara Palmer-Tomkinson	TV film
2005	Casualty	Mickie Hendrie	Episode: "Deny Thy Father: Part One"
2004–2006	Holby City	Mickie Hendrie	Series regular, 81 episodes
2006	Robin Hood	Eve	Episode: "A Thing or Two About Loyalty"
2008	Doctors	Amanda Prior	Episode: "The Front Page"
2010	The Persuasionists	Victoria Smeet	Episode: "The Handsomeness"
2009–2012	Hustle	Emma Kennedy	Series regular, 24 episodes
2012	The Town	Lucy	Mini-series, 3 episodes
2012	The Cricklewood Greats	Jenny Driscoll	
2013	Death in Paradise	Liz Curtis	Episode: "A Deadly Curse"
2013	Endeavour	Cynthia Riley	Episode: "Home"
2013–2014	Bluestone 42	Padre Mary Greenstock	Series regular, 15 episodes
2014–2015	Ronja, the Robber's Daughter	Birk Borkason (Voice role)	Series regular, 23 episodes
2015	Mr Selfridge	Nancy Webb	Series regular, 10 episodes
2015	The Delivery Man	Jess	Episode: "Theft"
2015	Doc Martin	Erica Holbrooke	Episode: "Facta Non Verba"
2019	London Kills	Michelle Charr	Episode: "Family Affairs"
2020	Agatha Raisin	Melissa Sheppard	Episode: "Love from Hell"

=== Theatre ===
Year	Title	Role	Venue	Notes
2002	My Three Angels	Marie Louise Ducotel	The Mill, Sonning Eye	
2003	Dreams from a Summer House	Mel	Watermill Theatre, Bagnor	
2007	Our Man in Havana	Beatrice Severn/Milly Wormwold	Yvonne Arnaud Theatre - Guildford, Churchill Theatre - Bromley & Theatre Royal, Windsor	with Bill Kenwright Ltd.
2014	Two into One	Jennifer	Menier Chocolate Factory, London	
