= My Last Five Girlfriends =

2009 British film

- Directed by: Julian Kemp
- Written by: Julian Kemp
- Based on: Essays In Love (U.S. title On Love) by Alain de Botton
- Produced by: Marion Pilowsky; David Willing; Michael Kelk
- Starring: Brendan Patricks; Naomie Harris; Kelly Adams; Cécile Cassel; Jane March; Edith Bukovics
- Music by: Andy Blythe and Marten Joustra
- Production company: Willing Pilowsky Productions
- Distributed by: Paramount Pictures
- Release dates: 23 April 2009 (Tribeca Film Festival); March 2010
- Running time: 90 minutes
- Country: United Kingdom
- Language: English

My Last Five Girlfriends is a 2009 British romantic black comedy film directed by Julian Kemp starring Brendan Patricks, based on pop-philosopher Alain de Botton's book, Essays In Love (U.S. title On Love).

== Plot ==
After yet another failed relationship, 30-something Duncan (Brendan Patricks) decides to quiz his last five girlfriends to find out what went wrong in order to figure out how to find love. With advice from bizarre sources and intense flights of fancy, finally Duncan realises that love is a battleground where only the fittest can survive.

== Cast ==
- Brendan Patricks as Duncan
- Naomie Harris as Gemma
- Kelly Adams as Wendy
- Cécile Cassel as Rhona
- Jane March as Olive
- Edith Bukovics as Natalie
- Michael Sheen as Burnam
- Mark Benton as Alan
- Daniel Hoffmann-Gill as Will
- Sarah Rodriguez as Paula

== Reception ==
Review aggregation website Rotten Tomatoes gives it a score of 28% based on reviews from 18 critics.
