= Rosalind Bailey =

British actress

Rosalind Bailey (born 1944) is a British actress, known for her portrayal of Sarah Headley (née Lytton) in the 1970s and 1980s BBC television drama When the Boat Comes In.

Bailey has appeared in numerous British television drama series, including Byker Grove, Distant Shores, Burn Up, and as a nurse in the last episode of Whatever Happened to the Likely Lads. Her stage work includes playing Miss Mary Shepherd in Alan Bennett’s play The Lady in the Van.
