= Marc Warren =

English actor (born 1967)

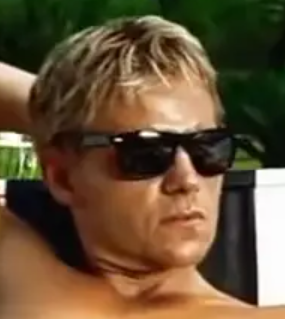
- Warren in Mad Dogs (2011)
- Born: 20 March 1967 (age 59); Northampton, West Northamptonshire, England
- Occupation: Actor
- Years active: 1986–present

Marc Warren (born 20 March 1967) is an English actor. His roles have included Albert Blithe in Band of Brothers (2001), Danny Blue in Hustle (2003–2007), Dougie Raymond in The Vice, Dominic Foy in State of Play, Rick in Mad Dogs (2011–2013), the Comte de Rochefort in The Musketeers (2015), the Gentleman in Jonathan Strange & Mr Norrell (2015), and Piet Van Der Valk in TV series Van Der Valk (2020). Other notable credits include Burn Up (2008), and Snatch (2017).

== Early life and education ==
Warren and his family moved from Northamptonshire to Farnborough, Hampshire in 1979. He attended Cove Senior School for two years before moving back to Northampton in 1982.

He studied drama at the East 15 Acting School in Loughton, Essex, but left without graduating after being asked to play "the colour orange".

== Career ==
=== Theatre ===
Warren made his professional debut in May 1986, when he appeared at The Northampton Theatre Royal in Stags and Hens. He was a member of the National Youth Theatre, and he played Billy Casper in Kes at the Birmingham Rep studio, and UK tour, directed by John Herriman for the Snap Theatre Company. In 1991, he played the role of 'Lot' in a production of Kingdom of Earth at the Redgrave Theatre in Farnham, Hampshire. In November 1991, he played Jem, in To Kill a Mockingbird, at the York Theatre Royal.

He starred in a revival of Martin McDonagh's The Pillowman at Leicester's Curve Theatre in 2009, playing Katurian, for which he was nominated for a TMA award for 'Best performance in a Play'. The same year, he starred as Ray Say in a West End revival of The Rise and Fall of Little Voice alongside Diana Vickers and Lesley Sharp. To promote the play, he wrote a series of articles for The Guardian, titled "Marc Warren's Little Voice diary", and appeared on The One Show.

Warren returned to the theatre in September 2011, playing the charismatic rebel protagonist in Emma Reeves' new adaptation of Donn Pearce's novel Cool Hand Luke, at London's Aldwych Theatre.

=== Film and television ===
Warren's first major film breakthrough was the 1992 BBC film An Ungentlemanly Act, in which he played Tony Hunt, alongside Ian Richardson. He appeared in Grange Hill in the early 1990s as schoolboy Thomas Rankin. He starred in the 1995 British drama film Boston Kickout, and played immortal Morgan D'Estaing in the season four Highlander episode "Double Jeopardy" in 1996. He played Police Constable Dougie Raymond in the British television series The Vice, and Albert Blithe in HBO's 2001 miniseries Band of Brothers.

In 2000, he was presented with a Royal Television Society award for his role as Monks in the ITV production of Oliver Twist. He appeared in the 2001 television drama Men Only as Mac, the husband of Katie (Esther Hall). In 2002, he played Dr. Ivo Steadman in No Night Is Too Long, a British film adapted from the novel of the same name. He played key supporting character Dominic Foy in the 2003 BBC serial State of Play. Between 2004 and 2007, he played Danny Blue (a main character) in the BBC TV series Hustle (series 1 to 4).

In June 2006, Warren played the character Elton Pope in the Doctor Who episode "Love & Monsters". In December of that year, he appeared as the crazed assassin Mr. Teatime in Sky One's adaptation of Hogfather by Terry Pratchett. The same month, he played Count Dracula in a new adaptation of Bram Stoker's classic novel, produced by ITV Productions for BBC Wales. The TV film, which aired in December, received viewing figures of 5.23 million.

In February 2007, he appeared as casino-operating villain Tony Crane in the second series of BBC drama Life on Mars. In December of the same year, he played Mr. John Simpson in the BBC production of Ballet Shoes with Emilia Fox and Emma Watson. In January 2008, he starred in the Messiah series Messiah V: The Rapture, taking over the main role from Ken Stott. He played the Repairman, a member of The Fraternity, in the 2008 film Wanted.

He won 'Overall Best Actor' at the 2009 Rome Fiction Festival, for his performance as Philip Crowley in Burn Up (2008).

In May 2010, Warren played Steve Strange in Worried About the Boy, a BBC production about the life of Boy George. The following year, he initiated and starred in a new Sky One production, Mad Dogs (alongside Max Beesley, Philip Glenister and John Simm), which eventually ran to fourteen episodes over four series.

He reprised his role of Danny Blue for the final episode of Hustle (series 8) in 2012. That same year, he joined the cast of the American drama The Good Wife in the recurring role of Kalinda Sharma's estranged husband. He played Rochefort in the BBC drama The Musketeers, and appeared as The Gentleman in the BBC's Jonathan Strange & Mr Norrell alongside Eddie Marsan.

From 2020, Warren starred as the title character in the ITV reboot of the '70s detective series Van der Valk. The fourth series went to air in August 2024.

=== Advertising ===
In 2009, Warren voiced "Orange" in a UK advertising campaign for Zurich Insurance Group alongside Alexander Armstrong.

In 2011, Warren fronted an ad campaign for Virgin Media's TiVo set-top boxes.

== Personal life ==
Warren is interested in magic, sleight of hand, and mentalism, and has spent some time studying the art of mind reading. In his spare time, he likes to meditate, and play the guitar. From 2007 to 2009, Warren was in a relationship with Abi Titmuss.

== Filmography ==
=== Film ===
| Year | Title | Role | Notes |
|---|---|---|---|
| 1995 | Boston Kickout | Robert | |
| 1996 | Shine | Ray | |
| 1997 | Bring Me the Head of Mavis Davis | Clint | |
| 1998 | B. Monkey | Terence | |
| 1998 | Dad Savage | Vic | |
| 2000 | Free Spirits | Cokehead | |
| 2002 | Al's Lads | Jimmy | Released in US as Capone's Boys |
| 2002 | Revengers Tragedy | Supervacuo | |
| 2003 | The Principles of Lust | Billy | |
| 2003 | Song for a Raggy Boy | Brother Mac | |
| 2005 | Green Street | Steve Dunham | |
| 2005 | Hellraiser: Deader | Joey | |
| 2006 | Colour Me Kubrick | Hud | |
| 2006 | Land of the Blind | Pool | |
| 2006 | The Lives of the Saints | Father Daniel | |
| 2008 | Intercom | Simon | short |
| 2008 | Wanted | The Repairman | |
| 2010 | Do Elephants Pray? | Marrlen | |
| 2011 | Wild Bill | Adam | |

=== Television ===
| Year | Title | Role | Notes |
|---|---|---|---|
| 1987–1995 | The Bill | Various | 4 episodes |
| 1991 | Casualty | Nick | Episode: "Humpty Dumpty" |
| 1991 | Gawain and the Green Knight | King Arthur | TV Film |
| 1992 | An Ungentlemanly Act | Tony Hunt | TV Film |
| 1992 | Grange Hill | Thomas Rankin | 4 episodes |
| 1992 | Between the Lines | PC Underwood | Episode: "Out of the Game" |
| 1992 | Sam Saturday | DC Colin Fennel | Episode: "A Chemical Reaction" |
| 1993 | Heartbeat | Rupert Ashfordly | Episode: "Secrets" |
| 1994 | Sharpe | Captain Rymer | Episode: Sharpe's Company |
| 1995 | Young Indiana Jones and the Attack of the Hawkmen | Manfred von Richthofen | TV Film |
| 1995 | Prime Suspect: Scent of Darkness | DC Andy Dyson | Series 4, Episode 3 |
| 1995 | The Ghostbusters of East Finchley | Butch | 3 episodes |
| 1996 | A Touch of Frost | Graham McArdy | Episode: "Paying the Price" |
| 1996 | Hidden in Silence | Lubic | Film dramatisation |
| 1997 | Highlander | Morgan D'Estaing | Episode: "Double Jeopardy" |
| 1997 | Wycliffe | DC Arnie Swarland | Episode: "Dance of the Scorpions" |
| 1998 | How Do You Want Me? | Mark Piggott | Episode: "Woof" |
| 1999 | Oliver Twist | Monks | 4 episodes |
| 1999–2000 | The Vice | Dougie Raymond | 10 episodes |
| 2000 | Black Cab | Stuart | Episode: "Work" |
| 2001 | Band of Brothers | Pvt. Albert Blithe | 3 episodes: "Currahee", "Day of Days" and "Carentan" |
| 2001 | The Bombmaker | Quinn | TV Film |
| 2001 | Men Only | Mac | Two-part drama |
| 2001 | Big Bad World | Russell | Series 3, Episode 4 |
| 2002 | NCS: Manhunt | Laurence Bright | Episode: "Tinderbox" |
| 2002 | Clocking Off | PC Jason Woods | Episode: "Franny's Story" |
| 2002 | No Night Is Too Long | Dr. Ivo Steadman | BBC television film |
| 2003 | State of Play | Dominic Foy | 2 episodes |
| 2003 | Reversals | Dr. Chris Singleton | TV Film |
| 2003 | Agatha Christie's Poirot | Meredith Blake | Episode: "Five Little Pigs" |
| 2004 | Pretending to Be Judith | Hugo | TV Film |
| 2004 | Agatha Christie's Miss Marple | Captain Ainsworth | Episode: "The Murder at the Vicarage" |
| 2004–2007; 2012 | Hustle | Danny Blue | Regular in series 1–4; guest appearance in series finale |
| 2005 | Vincent | Gary de Silva | Series 1, Episode 1 |
| 2005 | Twisted Tales | Alex Wright | |
| 2006 | Doctor Who | Elton Pope | Episode: "Love & Monsters" |
| 2006 | Terry Pratchett's Hogfather | Mr Jonathan Teatime | |
| 2006 | Dracula | Count Dracula | TV Film |
| 2007 | Life on Mars | Tony Crane | Episode: "Episode 1" |
| 2007 | Ballet Shoes | Mr. Simpson | BBC television film |
| 2008 | Messiah V: The Rapture | DCI Joseph Walker | |
| 2008 | Burn Up | Philip Crowley | |
| 2008 | Mutual Friends | Martin Grantham | |
| 2010 | Touched By Frost: Goodbye Jack | Narrator | TV Film |
| 2010 | Worried About the Boy | Steve Strange | TV Film |
| 2010 | Ben Hur | David | |
| 2010 | Worried About the Boy | Steve Strange | |
| 2010 | Accused | Kenny Armstrong | Series 1, Episode 5 |
| 2011–2013 | Mad Dogs | Rick | 14 episodes |
| 2011 | Without You | Greg | TV Mini Series 2011–2012; 3 episodes |
| 2012 | The Good Wife | Nick Saverese | 8 episodes |
| 2015 | The Musketeers | Rochefort | 9 episodes |
| 2015 | Jonathan Strange & Mr Norrell | The Gentleman with the Thistle-down Hair | 7 episodes |
| 2017 | Snatch | Bob Fink | 10 episodes |
| 2018 | Safe | Pete | 8 episodes |
| 2019 | Flack | Tom | 6 episodes |
| 2019 | Porters | Graham Post | Episode: "Halloween" |
| 2019 | Beecham House | Samuel Parker | Series 1, 6 episodes |
| 2020–2026 | Van der Valk | Piet Van der Valk | Lead role, 12 episodes |
| 2023 | Big Boys | Dennis King | 3 Episodes |
| 2024 | The Red King | Dr Ian Prideaux | 5 Episodes |
| 2025 | Missing You | Monte Leburne | 3 Episodes |

== Awards and nominations ==
| Year | Award | Category | Work | Result | Ref. |
|---|---|---|---|---|---|
| 2009 | Rome Fiction Festival | Overall Best Actor | Burn Up | Won | |
| 2018 | National Film Awards UK | Best Breakthrough Performance | Snatch (TV series) | Nominated | |
