= Albert Blithe =

United States Army soldier

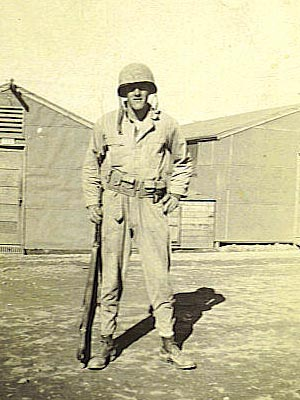
- Albert Blithe at Camp Toccoa, Georgia, in 1942
- Born: June 25, 1923; Philadelphia, Pennsylvania, United States
- Died: December 17, 1967 (aged 44); Wiesbaden, West Germany
- Burial place: Arlington National Cemetery
- Relatives: Kay Blithe (wife) Gordon Blithe (son)
- Military career
- Allegiance: United States
- Branch: United States Army
- Service years: 1942–1967
- Rank: Master Sergeant
- Nickname: Al
- Units: Easy Company, 2nd Battalion, 506th Parachute Infantry Regiment, 101st Airborne Division; 187th Airborne Regimental Combat Team
- Conflicts: World War II; Battle of Normandy (WIA); Battle of Carentan; Korean War
- Awards: Silver Star; Bronze Star Medal (3); Purple Heart (3)

Albert Blithe (June 25, 1923 – December 17, 1967) was an American career soldier who served as a private first class with Easy Company, 2nd Battalion, 506th Parachute Infantry Regiment, in the 101st Airborne Division during World War II. He served again with the Airborne during the Korean War and was twice decorated for gallantry. He eventually rose to the rank of Master Sergeant in the Army. His life story was featured in the 2010 book A Company of Heroes: Personal Memories about the Real Band of Brothers and the Legacy They Left Us by Marcus Brotherton.

== Youth ==
Blithe was born and raised in Philadelphia, Pennsylvania. After completing three years of high school, he enlisted for the paratroopers on August 18, 1942, in his hometown.

== Military service ==
=== World War II ===
Blithe trained at Camp Toccoa, Georgia, in August 1942 under Captain Herbert Sobel. Blithe jumped with the rest of Easy Company into occupied France as part of the massive Airborne invasion; however, when he landed, he found himself lost. Blithe was joined by a number of other paratroopers who were also part of the mis-drops. They teamed up together and found the rest of Easy Company.

Blithe was struck with a temporary case of hysterical blindness following the fierce fight to capture Carentan. He recovered and was part of a patrol investigating a farmhouse a few days later, where he was shot in the collar bone by a sniper. He was awarded a Purple Heart on June 25, 1944, his 21st birthday.

Due to his wound, on October 1, 1944, he was sent home and never returned to the European Theater of Operations. However, he eventually recovered. Blithe was released from the Army Hospital October 8, 1945, which has been verified by his discharge paperwork at the end of World War II. He attended the first annual reunion of the 101st Airborne Division Association, but despite this, Easy Company ended up losing track of him, and they assumed he succumbed to his collarbone wound in 1948. He returned to Philadelphia, Pennsylvania, and started a career with Westinghouse Electric.

=== Korean War and afterward ===
Blithe also served in Korea with the 187th Airborne Regimental Combat Team, where he was awarded a Bronze Star and a Silver Star for jumping behind enemy lines surrounded by a Chinese battalion. He was later assigned to the Military Assistance Advisory Group in Taiwan. He never retired from military service.

== Death ==
On December 10, 1967, while on active duty in Germany, Blithe felt nauseated when he returned from a weekend at Bastogne, Belgium, where he had taken part in the ceremonies commemorating the Battle of the Bulge. On December 11, 1967, Blithe was taken to the emergency department at Wiesbaden Hospital, Germany, where he was admitted with a diagnosis of a perforated ulcer. He died in the intensive care unit on December 17 after surgery, and was buried in Arlington National Cemetery with full honors.

== Depiction in Band of Brothers ==
Blithe was portrayed by actor Marc Warren in the popular HBO series Band of Brothers, and serves as the viewpoint character of the third episode, "Carentan", covering the titular battle. The episode depicts him dealing with shell shock after the drops, and erroneously depicts his injury in Normandy as being in the neck rather than the shoulder.

At the end of the episode, it is said that Blithe "never recovered from the wounds he received in Normandy" and that he died in 1948. This was an error, as none of the other veterans from Easy Company found out what had happened to him, and assumed that he had died in 1948 from his wound. Stephen Ambrose, who collected the veteran's memories, regarded this as factual information, and repeated the claim in his book Band of Brothers, E Company, 506th Regiment, 101st Airborne: From Normandy to Hitler's Eagle's Nest. The Blithe family later denied this, which led to corrections in the subsequent editions of that same book. The series, and resulting DVDs or Blu-Ray discs do not have these changes, and still present the false claim. However, some Blu-Ray editions feature an annotation using the "Easy Company Field Guide" extra-feature where the statement is corrected.

== Bibliography ==
- Ambrose, Stephen E. (1992). Band of Brothers: Easy Company, 506th Regiment, 101st Airborne from Normandy to Hitler's Eagle's Nest. Simon & Schuster. ISBN 978-0-7434-6411-6.
- Brotherton, Marcus (2010). A Company of Heroes: Personal Memories about the Real Band of Brothers and the Legacy They Left Us. Berkley Caliber. ISBN 978-0-425-23420-4.
