= Hustle (TV series) =

British television series

- Title card from series 5 to series 8 (2009–2012)
- Created by: Tony Jordan
- Starring: Adrian Lester; Robert Glenister; Matt Di Angelo; Kelly Adams; Robert Vaughn; Jaime Murray; Marc Warren; Rob Jarvis; Ashley Walters
- Theme music composer: Simon Rogers
- Country of origin: United Kingdom
- Original language: English
- No. of series: 8
- No. of episodes: 48 (list of episodes)

Production
- Executive producers: Karen Wilson; Howard Burch; Tony Jordan; Simon Crawford Collins
- Running time: 60 minutes ~52 minutes outside UK
- Production company: Kudos Film & Television

Original release
- Network: BBC One; BBC HD (2007–2010); BBC One HD (2011–2012)
- Release: 24 February 2004 – 17 February 2012

Hustle is a British crime drama television series starring Adrian Lester, Robert Glenister and Robert Vaughn. Created by Tony Jordan, it was produced by Kudos Film and Television, and broadcast on BBC One in the United Kingdom. The show premiered on 24 February 2004, and ran for eight series, with its final episode aired on 17 February 2012. The show's premise was on a group of con artists who specialise in "long cons" – extended forms of deceptive frauds that require greater commitment, but offer higher rewards than simple confidence tricks. The show's most notable qualities are plots that involve behind-the-scenes action that the viewers are unaware of until near the end of an episode, along with fantasy scenes and occasional breaches of the fourth wall by the main actors.

The show achieved consistently high viewing figures throughout its eight-year run and was received favourably by critics.

== Premise ==
Each episode's plot focuses on a team of grifters who conduct the art of the "long con", often targeting a "mark" whose activities are immoral and/or illegal, or whose character retains a fundamental negative personality with others they dislike, or who they make suffer, while adhering to the credo that "you can't cheat an honest man". Although con artists, the team display a moral, honourable code within their team, which include sometimes helping others who have been victims of their mark, often with anonymous financial compensation to them, and never stealing anything that doesn't belong to them, instead borrowing them for the con and then returning them afterwards. For each mark, the team focuses on background research to uncover any issues they may face, as well as a weakness in the mark that they can exploit, such as a passion for something, or an issue they are facing. Once they have a plan, the team set up a scenario, employ a "convincer" to rope in their mark, and then hit them with the sting in which they take them for a sizeable amount of cash, within the tens of thousands, before conducting a "blow-off" to ensure the mark will not come after them, either because they won't if they have to admit to conducting something illegal, or because the team has convinced them it will be impossible to do so.

== Characters ==
The main cast of Hustle (series 4)

The main cast of Hustle (series 5–8)

- Michael "Mickey Bricks" Stone (Adrian Lester – Series 1–3, 5–8) – the lead 'inside man', Mickey is an ambitious and intelligent conman, known for being a world-renowned long-con expert with a careful eye for detail and ensuring that every part of his plan is covered, including a back-up plan for when things go wrong. While smart, his success has given him a considerable ego that he is unbeatable, while he has a severe dislike of being told what to do. He firmly hates the system that benefits wealthy people who are immoral, corrupt and greedy, which stems from the emotional trauma of watching his father dying prior to the retirement he had worked hard for all his life. During the show's first two series, the writers made notable implications that Lester's character had previously had romantic relations with Stacie, and during the fifth and sixth series, created romantic tensions between him and Emma Kennedy. He was initially married to another woman, but divorced her during the first series. Lester departed from the show after the third series, with his character written out as a result, before returning to take part in the fifth series, staying with the show until the end of its final series.
- Albert Stroller (Robert Vaughn – Series 1–8) – the 'roper', Stroller is a semi-retired, legendary 'old-school' grifter, who has a fondness for gambling and cheating at cards, frequents many private clubs, has professional friendships with hotel concierges, and specialises in identifying potential marks and ensnaring them. Vaughn's character is mainly portrayed as a mentor and grandfather figure, responsible for training Mickey to be who he is. Despite his experience, he has served time for his crimes, doing so again after the fourth series until the midpoint of the fifth series. Although his backstory puts it that he began his life as a grifter by conning his former employers at a shoe factory and spreading his proceeds among his former co-workers before leaving the States, the third series revealed that he served in the US Army during World War II, while the seventh series revealed that he had a daughter from a previous relationship.
- Ash "Three Socks" Morgan (Robert Glenister – Series 1–8) – the 'fixer', Morgan is a resourceful, all-round grifter, capable of finding and setting up locations and securing people, items and websites that are needed to help with convincing a mark that the con is anything but, and gifted at impersonating various people ranging from anything such as elderly pensioners and utility workers to sophisticated upper-class businessmen and politicians. Part of his character includes his love of conducting 'the flop', thanks mainly to an old skull fracture he obtained in a bar brawl, passing it off as a fresh injury. During the first series, the writers had him doing the short con with a female partner who suffered brain damage as a direct result; although this was written to have an impact on his character, the plot device was rarely used again in later series. Glenister is the only actor in the show to have appeared in every episode of the show, with the writers later giving his character a lead part in the eighth series on a story that Lester wrote and directed.
- Stacie Monroe (Jaime Murray – Series 1–4, Guest in Series 8) – a charmer, Monroe specialises in using her sex appeal to manipulate potential marks, assisting Morgan in acquiring what is needed, and conducting short cons to help raise funds for the long con they are performing. While extremely intelligent and accomplished, she prefers not to be involved in a romantic connection with another man since her ex-husband left her and took all their life savings with him; this plot device was explored further during the second series. Throughout her appearance between the first and fourth series, the writers created romantic tensions between her and Blue. After she and Warren decided not to return for the fifth series due to scheduling conflicts, her character was written out of the show as a direct result, though the writers later wrote her back in as part of the show's finale after Murray agreed to reprise her role.
- Danny Blue (Marc Warren – Series 1–4, Guest in Series 8) – a seasoned short-con artist, Blue is somewhat brash but enthusiastic and imaginative, often wishing to prove he has the talent to pull off long cons and dreaming of being the best grifter in London. As part of his backstory by the writers, Blue's family were mostly crooks who were somewhat dishonourable; none of his family are shown, except for his grandmother, whom he deeply loves. During the first three series, he was relegated to the role of second 'inside man' and being taught what he needed to know about the long con, maintaining a firm rivalry with Mickey with a petty competitive nature between the two, though with each of them respecting the other. After Lester departed from the show, the writers upgraded Warren's character to the leader of the team, with the whole series focused on the development of Blue in his new role. Like Murray, Warren decided not to return to the show for the fifth series due to conflicts in his schedule, and thus his character was written out of the show, though he later agreed to reprise his role as his character, alongside Murray, for the show's finale.
- Billy Bond (Ashley Walters – Series 4) – a young rookie, whom the writers devised to take on the role of Warren's character for the fourth series – astute, with a talent for short cons, though his backstory reveals him to have prior involvement with drug-dealing and street gangs. Despite his past, he is a likeable character among his peers, with a deep respect for Blue and a passion to learn what he needs to about the long con. While Walters decided not to return for the fifth series, the writers wrote off his character without any explanations of what became of him afterwards, though speculation by fans is that he joined with Blue and Monroe in the States; while Walters' character did not appear for the show's finale, it is unclear whether the production staff asked him to reprise this role again.
- Sean Kennedy (Matt Di Angelo – Series 5–8) – a talented young man and one half of a duo along with his sister Emma, Sean originally aspired to be an actor, but later chooses to be an understudy of Mickey and learning to be the 'inside man', with additional mentoring by Morgan. He was created as a replacement for Blue, after Warren chose not to return for the fifth series, and his backstory shows him to be eager yet overprotective of his sister while having a firm hatred of his father for abandoning his family when he was young; the emotional impact further increased when he and his sister were put into foster care after their mother died.
- Emma Kennedy (Kelly Adams – Series 5–8) – a talented woman and the brains behind the duo made up of her and her brother Sean, Emma endured to be the stronger of the Kennedy children after they were put into foster care. Like Di Angelo, Adams' character was created by the writers as a replacement for Murray, after she chose not to return for the fifth series, with her character having the same role as Monroe. In her backstory, alongside having no love for her father, she originally held a previous relationship during her childhood and maintains a firm dislike for men who are sexist, being skilful at drinking games.
- Eddie (Rob Jarvis – Series 1–8) – the owner and proprietor of a local London bar frequented by the team for socialising and planning cons, Eddie is somewhat gullible and at times deluded over his skills and is rather shy when talking to women he likes, yet he maintains respect for Mickey and the others and adopts an attitude of ignorance of what they are doing, sometimes helping out if needed. Despite the team playing tricks and short cons on him, usually to get out of paying drinks or winning money from him, the team hold a deep affection for him and occasionally help him out when he's in trouble.

== Production ==
=== Conception ===
Hustle was largely born from the same production team that created and popularised the early series of Spooks, a similarly styled drama series first broadcast in 2002. Bharat Nalluri, that series' Executive Director, conceived the idea in early 2002 while filming for the first Spooks series was ongoing. Nalluri pitched the concept to Jane Featherstone, managing director of Kudos Film & Television which was the production company behind Spooks, in the back of a taxi while returning from a day's filming. Intrigued by the idea, Featherstone recruited Tony Jordan, the lead scriptwriter of the soap opera EastEnders, to develop it into a workable proposal.

Jordan quickly produced some initial script drafts, which Featherstone took to the BBC; Gareth Neame, Head of Drama Commissioning, rapidly approved a six-part series. Featherstone assembled a production team that had considerable overlap with the Spooks crew, including Simon Crawford Collins as producer and Matthew Graham as co-writer. In creating the first episodes, Jordan drew inspiration from the long tradition of confidence tricks and heists in Hollywood and television, including The A-Team, The Sting and The Grifters (and in a similar vein, the films and TV series of Mission: Impossible). Featherstone remarked that "Ocean's Eleven was on around the time Bharat and I first spoke, and I think it helped to inspire us, but really we took our inspiration from a whole catalogue of movies and books ... we wanted to make something that had the energy, verve, style and pure entertainment value of those sorts of films" At the same time, the writers attempted to draw on the success of recent blockbusters such as Ocean's Eleven and Mission: Impossible; speaking in an interview in December 2003, Crawford explained that "[such shows] worked because of the interaction within the group – the plotlines were almost irrelevant".

=== Casting ===
With Hustle greenlit for filming, the production team began searching for actors to play both the main characters and the marks for each episode. The process was initially quite difficult; Crawford described his "immediate thought [as] 'this is so good, how the hell are we going to get a cast to live up to these characters?' ... Tony had created incredibly strong characters, each with their own particular style and panache, but they also had to form a believable, if unusual, 'family' unit". Robert Vaughn, the Academy Award-nominated star of The Man from U.N.C.L.E., was soon suggested as a natural choice to play Albert Stroller, the elderly 'roper' responsible for ensnaring potential marks. After meeting Vaughn over lunch, Crawford "[recognised] straight away that he could bring a whole new dimension to the part of Albert". Vaughn was immediately offered the role, and asked to begin filming the following day.

Jordan's script called for a group of five con artists or "grifters", with a wide range of ages, appearances and experience. The production team cast Adrian Lester, at the time playing Henry V at the National Theatre, as Michael Stone, the leader of the group; Marc Warren as Danny Blue, Stone's younger protégé; and Robert Glenister as Ash Morgan, the "fixer"; in August 2003. Although having numerous credits in film and on the stage, Lester was an unknown face in television, having had less than two hours' broadcast screen time prior to the first Hustle series. Lester explained that he "couldn't imagine playing the same character for years, but Hustle was completely different. In the very first rehearsal we were doing a dance routine and then the next thing I know I'm whacking out several different accents and I just thought, 'I'm in heaven, this is great!'"

Jaime Murray completed the lead actors, playing Stacie Monroe who, as the grifters' only female member, is self-styled as "the lure". Murray, described by one of the Hustle production team as "that rare specimen – a stunningly beautiful actress who can actually act", and who auditioned in platform shoes to match her 5 ft 7in height with Stacie's description as having "legs that go on for miles", was reportedly "terrified" to be working with the more famous actors Vaughn and Lester, saying "when we were filming the first couple of episodes I was absolutely petrified and was convinced that it would be really obvious on screen. So when I watched some of it on tape I was totally amazed that you couldn't see how frightened I really was. I kept thinking, 'Oh my God! I'm working with Adrian Lester and Robert Vaughn. Any time now someone is going to tap me on the shoulder and ask me to get my coat!'"

In addition to the lead actors, the production team recruited a number of actors, both major and minor, to play the marks in each episode; including David Haig, Tamzin Outhwaite, and David Calder.

=== Filming ===
With the cast and crew in place, filming for the first Hustle series took place in London between August and November 2003. The lead actors were given professional instruction in sleight-of-hand and pick-pocketing; "all the tricks of the trade from card-shuffling to stealing watches", according to Lester. The cast found the experience informative; Murray explained, "I realised that most cons are all about diversion – while you're trying to con somebody you're doing something to distract them in the opposite direction so they don't notice and that's exactly how pickpockets work".

Several members of the cast described Hustle's filming schedule as incredibly hectic. Vaughn said that "[the role] was offered to me, and I was told to get on a plane an hour after I got the phone call and start shooting the following day." Speaking in 2009 after filming four series of the show, Lester explained that "when we start shooting Hustle we film two episodes concurrently, with the scenes out of sequence. Knowing where you are in the intricate plots at any one moment is ... challenging". Murray, by contrast, claimed that the hardest scene to film was from the fourth episode, when Danny loses spectacularly to Stacie in strip poker and ends up entirely naked. "It was the toughest scene for me of the entire six months we spent filming the series ... Stacie is supposed to be calm, cool and collected ... she looks down, checks him out and casually and suavely makes a comment. I kept looking down, dissolving into fits of laughter and was almost unable to deliver my line. So all you'll see is me laughing".

Although the programme typically contains few non-trivial stunts or dramatic special effects, the first episode includes an example of Ash Morgan's favourite con, known as "The Flop": having previously received a fractured skull in a bar brawl, Morgan deliberately steps in front of moving cars and exaggerates the accident. Although not actually hurt, X-ray scans show his fractured skull, and the driver's insurance company pays out a compensation claim. Glenister balked at doing the entire stunt himself, saying "I got a stunt man who did all the smashing against the windscreen stunts but I did everything else ... We all like doing the stunts involving driving fast because it's boy's-own stuff but when it comes to the dangerous stunts I'm quite happy to leave it to someone else!"

=== Release ===
The first episode of the series of Hustle was broadcast on BBC One on 24 February 2004, driven by a strong advertising campaign organised by Abbott Mead Vickers, surrounding its slogan, "The Con is On", the same name as that of the initial episode's title. The programme was an immediate success, attracting over 6.7 million viewers, and attracting favourable reviews (see below). Before the first series had finished airing, the BBC had sold rebroadcast licences to TV channels in twelve countries, including Italy, Norway, Germany, Israel, Russia and the Netherlands. Anita Davison, Commercial Director for BBC Worldwide, claimed that "the series [had] all the hallmarks of a huge international hit". The series was later licensed to broadcasters in India and South America.

== Series overview ==
In response to the extremely positive reaction, the BBC recommissioned the show for a second series on 17 March 2004, after just three episodes had aired. The second series retained much of the initial production team including Jordan as lead scriptwriter, and introduced Karen Wilson as producer.

=== Series two ===
Filming for the second Hustle series took place in mid-2004, again in and around central London. Lester described the second shoot as "much easier" than the chaotic first series. "On the first series we didn't know each other... we were trying to work out what roles we were going to play and the scripts were still being written as we were shooting it; it was all a case of finding out what exactly Hustle was going to be.. second time around it was much easier, much quicker... when we were reading the script you could really hear the other actors doing their lines because you knew kind of how they were going to do them..." With the success of the first series, Hustle's team of writers were able to be more inventive in creating new plots for the second six-episode run, including issues some of the characters had to deal with, and stories which could keep the audience guessing until the end.

The programme retained all of the lead actors from the first series; guest actors appearing in the second run included Lee Ingleby, Fay Ripley, and Robert Llewellyn. The second series was broadcast on BBC One from 29 March 2005, to a first-night audience of 6.7 million.

=== Series three ===
In the wake of the equally successful second series, the BBC took Hustle to the American market, securing a licensing deal with AMC. In addition to exclusive broadcast rights to the first and second series in the United States, AMC also took the position of co-production partner on the third series, already in pre-production, with the option to take the same position on a fourth series. The BBC described the move as "Securing the right platform... essential for a series to succeed in the competitive US market...". The first two series premiered in the US in January 2006 on AMC The BBC also secured new licensing deals with broadcasters in Australia and New Zealand.

Capitalising on Hustle's international success, the BBC created a spin off series, The Real Hustle, which premiered on 10 February 2006. The documentary follows three genuine hustlers – a magician and professional gambler, a glamorous actress, and a professional sleight-of-hand artist and crooked gambling consultant – as they pull short-cons on unsuspecting businesses and members of the public. The BBC described the series as an attempt "to reveal how the scams work so that the viewer can avoid being ripped off by the same con".

All five of the lead actors again reprised their roles in the third series, which featured guest stars including Richard Chamberlain, Linford Christie, Sara Cox and Paul Nicholls. The series premiered on 10 March 2006, running until 14 April. The second episode, featuring Danny and Mickey running naked through Trafalgar Square, attracted a viewing audience of 6 million. Lester described the scene as one of his most embarrassing moments on-set, saying "you forget just how many phone cameras there are... we thought [the Square] was fairly deserted, but as soon as someone shouted 'Action' there was a tour bus behind us and the whole top deck suddenly started filming".

=== Series four ===
With the backing of AMC, a fourth series of Hustle was virtually guaranteed, and by late 2006 it was clear that the cable network was taking a commanding role in the show's development. Despite the increased funding AMC provided, which allowed the writers to set episodes in Las Vegas and Los Angeles, the series was quickly mired in casting concerns. The BBC confirmed Adrian Lester's departure in September 2006, elevating Marc Warren's character to the lead role and casting Ashley Walters as a new member of the group. The BBC was quick to dispel any suggestion that Lester's resignation was connected to the shift in production focus, stating "it is a shame that, due to his current filming commitments, Adrian cannot join us this time round...", while Lester explained his action as "need[ing] to do something else, be associated with something else". However, Lester also admitted that he felt that the series "just got a little bit too 'light'".

=== Series five ===
Despite concerns over ratings, the BBC commissioned for a fifth series in early 2008, airing on 28 October 2008, with the return of Adrian Lester, the departure of cast members Marc Warren and Jaime Murray, and the arrival of Matt Di Angelo and Kelly Adams as their replacements. With the return of Lester's character, Mickey Bricks, Ashley Walters's Billy Bond was removed. Patricia Hodge was written to return in the 5th series, however production issues resulted in her departing the show, subsequently delaying the release of the series.

=== Series six ===
Series Six started 4 January 2010. All of the fifth series cast returned with production that moved to Birmingham, despite the show retaining its London setting. The series once again consisted of six episodes.

=== Series seven ===
The seventh series of Hustle began airing on 7 January 2011. All main cast members from series 6 reprised their roles.

=== Series eight ===
The eighth series started airing on 13 January 2012 on BBC1 at 9 pm after being pushed back from 6 January. Creator Tony Jordan said that it would be the last series for at least a while; later, the BBC announced that there would not be a series 9. Guest stars featuring this series include Sheila Hancock, Martin Kemp and Paterson Joseph and former Liverpool footballer Ian Rush. Peter Polycarpou and John Barrowman also revealed on Twitter that they had guest roles in series eight. This was the third series to be filmed in Birmingham, the fifth in HD and the fourth series featuring all of the current cast. Adrian Lester directed an episode, in which Mickey is kidnapped.

== Broadcast history ==
Following much media speculation, including reports of the programme being cancelled and a motion picture spin-off, the BBC announced on 12 June 2008 that Hustle had been recommissioned for a fifth series with series 1–3 star, Adrian Lester returning to the show alongside Robert Glenister and Robert Vaughn. Due to scheduling conflicts, Marc Warren and Jaime Murray did not feature in series five, with Matt Di Angelo and Kelly Adams joining the cast. It was also reported that Patricia Hodge who guest starred as Veronica Powell in the 4th series, would return in the 5th, however due to issues with on-set production, the episode her character was featured in was scrapped and never aired. This subsequently delayed the release of the 5th series, which instead aired in October 2008.

=== Film ===
In June 2006, 20th Century Fox acquired the film rights to Hustle; and creator, Tony Jordan, wrote several drafts. In February 2009, executive producer, Simon Crawford Collins stated that the movie was to be produced by a major United States studio. However, the film was never made.

== DVD releases ==
The Australian (Region 4) releases of series 1 to 4 use NTSC format. The first six seasons were distributed by Roadshow Entertainment. Below is Region 4 (Australia) Releases:

- Season 1–11 February 2008 (Re-Release 1 February 2012)
- Season 2–7 May 2008 (Re-Release 1 February 2012)
- Season 3–11 December 2008 (Re-Release 1 February 2012)
- Season 4 - 2009 (Re-Release 1 February 2012)
- Season 5–2 March 2010 (Re-Release 1 February 2012)
- Season 6–16 August 2011 (Re-Release 1 February 2012)
- Season 7–7 March 2012
- Season 8–14 November 2012
- Season 1-8 - 1 March 2013

== Reception ==
=== Critical response ===
The first series of Hustle, broadcast from 24 February to 30 March 2004, attracted generally favourable reviews and audience figures. The Guardian described it as "defiantly high-concept, tightly plotted, knowing stuff... a laugh; slick, glossy, and smart certainly, but a laugh all the same", and The Times remarked that it had "the snap and style of a series that has been cryogenically frozen in the 1960s and brought back to life, like The Clangers... The wonderfully absurd result is a drama series that takes itself far less seriously than almost anything since The Persuaders". A later review from the same paper summarised the series as "an engaging, well-acted, snappily directed drama... sleekly edited, flatteringly lit, and stylishly executed... Will you remember a single moment of it five minutes after you've watched an episode? Probably not. But who cares?" The first three episodes attracted an average audience of 6.2 million, peaking at over 30% of the total audience.

=== Viewership ===
Series	UK broadcast	Average audience
1	24 February – 30 March 2004	6.47 million
2	25 March – 3 May 2005	5.82 million
3	10 March – 14 April 2006	5.86 million
4	3 May – 7 June 2007	5.54 million
5	8 January – 12 February 2009	6.07 million
6	4 January – 8 February 2010	6.27 million
7	7 January – 18 February 2011	6.79 million
8	13 January – 17 February 2012	6.21 million

=== Awards and nominations ===
The title sequence, created by Berger & Wyse, was nominated for a Royal Television Society Award (2005), a BAFTA (2006) and an Emmy (2007).
