= Burn Up (TV series) =

2008 miniseries

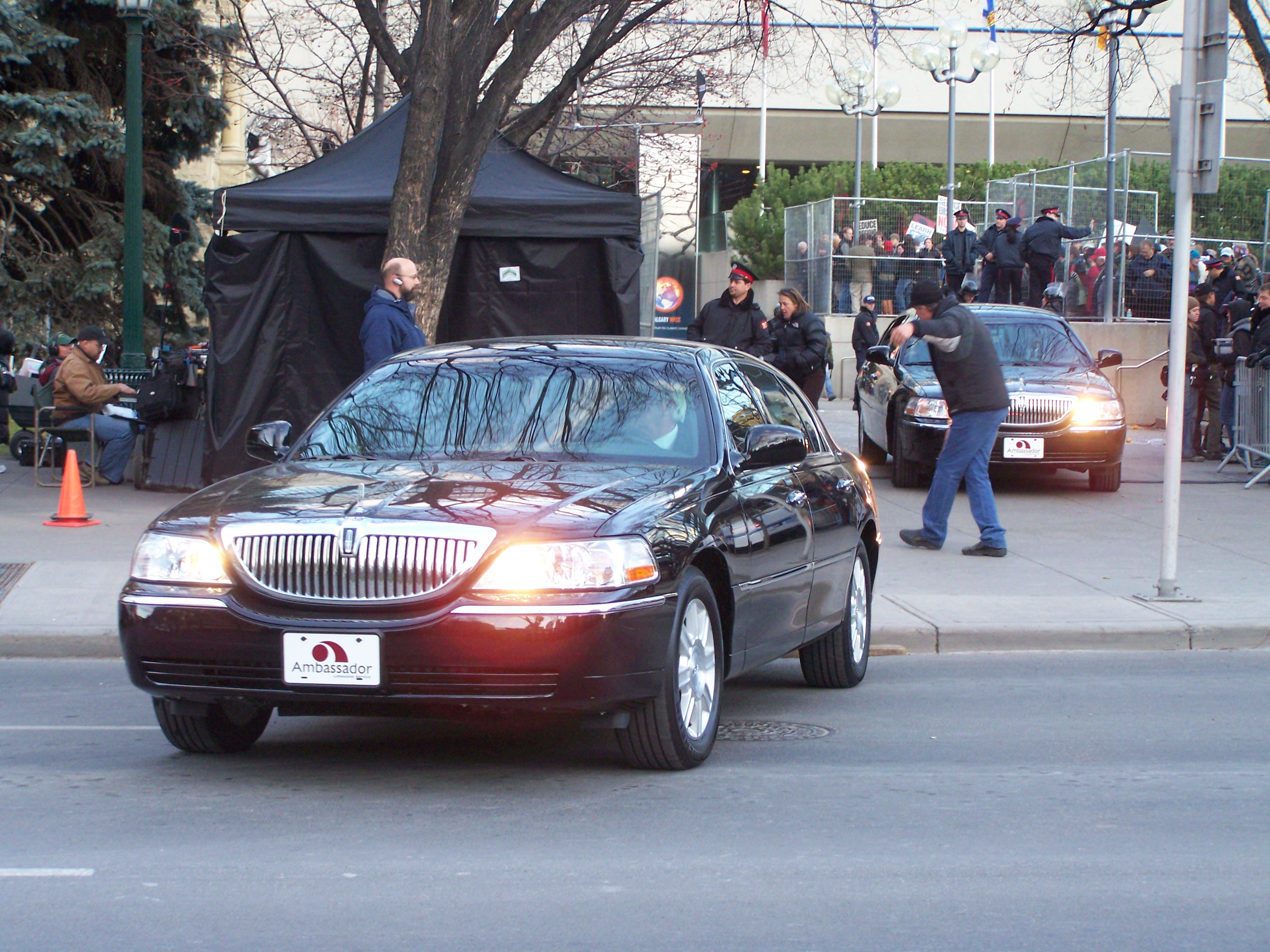
- Film shooting at Calgary's City Hall (November 2007)
- Genre: Drama
- Written by: Simon Beaufoy
- Directed by: Omar Madha
- Starring: Rupert Penry-Jones; Neve Campbell; Bradley Whitford
- Countries of origin: United Kingdom; Canada
- Original language: English
- No. of series: 1
- No. of episodes: 2

Production
- Executive producers: Tom Cox; Stephen Garrett
- Producer: Christopher Hall
- Running time: 2 x 90 minutes (Full running time) 177 minutes

Original release
- Network: Global Television Network
- Release: 10 June 2008
- Network: BBC Two
- Release: 23 July – 25 July 2008

Burn Up is a 2008 BBC/Global drama dealing with the issues of climate change and peak oil.

== Plot summary ==
=== Episode 1 ===
Oil surveyor Masud Khamil narrowly escapes an attack on his camp in the deserts of Saudi Arabia and flees with some valuable data. Tom McConnell replaces his father-in-law Sir Mark Foxbay as Chairman of Arrow Oil. At the celebration party, Inuit activist Mika Namuvai enters uninvited and serves Tom a writ from her people. The writ decries global warming and its causes, such as Arrow's production facility on the Athabasca tar sands. The shock of Mika's subsequent ejection causes Tom's daughter to have an asthma attack, but she is saved by Holly Dernay, head of renewable energy at Arrow.

In testimony before the US Senate in Washington, Sir Richard Langham, Tom's former geology professor, testifies on the dangers of global warming, but he is discredited by a pro-oil senator using muck racked up by devious oil lobbyist James "Mack" Mackintosh. Tom confronts Mack, his longtime friend, about the tactics. Mack denies that he spread the story, but he is clearly committed to serving his employers. Back in London, Tom wins his court case but then sees Mika set fire to herself on the court steps.

Tom and Holly attend Mika's funeral in Alberta, where Sir Richard sends them into the wilderness to see the truth for themselves. Holly pokes a hole in the ice covering a swamp and is able to ignite the methane gas waiting to be released. Later, while overnighting in an isolated shack on the tundra, Tom and Holly become intimate.

Meanwhile, British Prime-Ministerial Aide Philip Crowley offers unofficial government assistance to the Green Congress as they prepare for the World Forum on Climate Change (WFCC), a United Nations conference about global warming in Calgary, Alberta, Canada.

Masud returns to London and makes contact with Sir Mark, who has spoken with Masud before and agrees to meet to accept some confidential geology data. Sir Mark is clearly conflicted over what to do with the data.

Tom and Holly discuss pulling out of Athabasca, which has the most polluting oil of Arrow's many interests, and investing that money in renewables. Phillip confronts Holly with his knowledge that the desert massacre was done by mercenaries for the oil industry and not terrorists. But before she can talk to Tom, Tom finds Mack at her overturned apartment, where Mack reveals that Holly orchestrated Mika's protest at the party. Phillip stops Holly from returning to her apartment, instructing her to lie low. Tom wanders off to visit Sir Mark. Sir Mark hears a noise and goes outside, only to be struck dead in a hit-and-run. Tom and Masud, approaching from different directions, are witnesses. Tom runs to help, and Masud flees.

=== Episode 2 ===
Crowley sends Dernay to the World Forum on Climate Change in Calgary to look for Masud. Mack leads the Open Business Coalition and their friendly countries in moves to scupper Kyoto II. Dernay contacts Masud and tries to go to McConnell but he dismisses her. Crowley gets support within the Open Business Coalition from McConnell and the insurance companies and they win over the United States Treasury Secretary Brent Schlaes. Under pressure from Schlaes the US delegate softens his stance at the conference. Mack, feeling under threat from his boss, tries to scare off Dernay who has finally convinced McConnell to meet with Masud. At the meeting Masud hands over the data from the survey Foxbay commissioned that proves that the Saudi oil reserves have run out.

At a meeting in the Calgary Tower Mack warns McConnell of the chaos that will be unleashed if Masud's data is published. The hard-line Robert Cooper is appointed as the new US delegate and goes back on the agreements of his predecessor. The Chinese delegate makes approaches to McConnell and the Green Congress so Crowley brokers a deal with them to sign Kyoto II. Dernay tries to bluff Mack and he warns her off but he is too late and she is killed. Mack confronts his boss who threatens to go after McConnell next to get the data. Cooper agrees a sideline treaty with the Chinese and walks out without signing Kyoto II. Mack confronts McConnell on the roof and after getting the data from him, he smuggles it past his boss's men and hands it over to Crowley for publication.

== Cast ==
- Rupert Penry-Jones as Tom McConnell
- Bradley Whitford as James 'Mack' Mackintosh
- Neve Campbell as Holly Dernay
- Marc Warren as Philip Crowley
- San Shella as Masud Kamil
- Ron Cook as Sir Richard Langham
- Claire Skinner as Clare McConnell
- David Calder as Sir Mark Foxbay
- Rosalind Bailey as Lillian Foxbay
- Tigerlily Hutchinson as Lilly McConnell
- Sandrine Holt as Mika Namuvai
- Maureen Thomas as Chairwoman
- Nigel Bennett as Jerry
- Stephen Bogaert as Matthias
- Brenda Bazinet as Marianne
- Rosemary Dunsmore as Margo
- Linden Banks as Rolf
- Seana McKenna as Francine
- Chris Kelly as Brandon
- Camilla Scott as Constance
- Michael St.John Smith as Martin
- Greg Lawson as John
- Barbara Gates Wilson as Cherry
- Don Allison as Brent Schlaes
- Melba Montgomery as the Mexican Ambassador

== Production ==
BBC Controller of Fiction Jane Tranter commissioned the drama for transmission on BBC Two. The screenplay was written by Simon Beaufoy.

As a lifelong fan of the political thriller, it's been incredibly satisfying to marry it to the most urgent issue facing us as the century unfolds – a potent cocktail of fiction and fact that we hope will enlighten as much as it will entertain.

— Executive Producer Stephen Garrett.

It was produced by Kudos Film and Television in co-production with Canadian production company SEVEN24 Films.

Burn Up is a highly authored piece wholly of this unique moment in time. The exciting mix of US, Canadian and UK talent, the awesome backdrop of the Canadian wilds combined with Simon's taut and provocative script makes for an epic proposition.

— BBC Commissioning Editor for Drama, Lucy Richer.

Shot in Calgary, Alberta and London, England, the series is unusual for actually being set in Calgary, prompting Eric Volmers to write in the Calgary Herald that "while filming in the city is hardly unique, it's rare for a high-profile project to feature Calgary as Calgary".

== Reception ==
=== Reviews ===
Eric Volmers writing in the Calgary Herald states that, "the opening scene is a suitably violent and tense intro that manages to conjure up both a sinister and international tone to the four-hour Canadian-U.K. co-production," and goes on to say that, "Burn Up asks decidedly unsettling questions about big oil and political expediency, the environmental impact of the Athabasca oil sands and even American foreign policy," which he claims, "was perhaps a surprising project to find life amid the "oil-is-good" sentiment of Alberta."

Sam Wollaston writing in The Guardian compliments the character development and interaction that is, "going on all over the place", and credits Whitford and Warren as "the stars of Burn Up", before going on to say Penry-Jones is, "lively in the lead". He claims the series is an improvement on recent docudramas in that, "it has a proper script" and that while, "the across-the-green-line romance is a little embarrassing", "the whole thing skips along", and, "at times it thrills, which is no bad thing in a thriller", but it, "is issue-led, rather than story-led", and overall it feels, "a bit crude", "as opposed to refined". Gareth McLean writing in the same publication said that, "despite the occasional flashy moment, high-octane drama this is not", criticising the series for, "copious amounts of tiresome expositional dialogue and a leaden plot", before concluding, "why not treat yourself and rent Syriana instead?".

Tim Teeman writing in The Times calls the series, "a consciousness-raising thriller", that, "is trying desperately to do that BBC thing of being sexy and responsible". He states that, "the arguments about oil production and the environment felt clunky and little more than speechifying", that the series was, "in danger of forgetting that drama should be drama, not a lecture, and that characters should be characters, not ciphers", but, "despite the didactic politicking, the pace is unrelenting and the baddies at least are colourful and engaging". He complimented Whitford who, "villainously devoured every scene", for his, "needling chemistry" with the, "brilliant", Warren, and concluded that, "Whitford and Campbell together, him snarling, her looking all impish and button-nosed, had me almost pathetically excited: The West Wing and Party of Five united on screen is pretty near Teeman TV Heaven." David Chater writing in the same publication describes the series as, "highly watchable", thanks to, "a fast-paced, intelligent script and some fine acting", although the, "characters tend to come with labels, and the elements of thriller are there for excitement rather than credibility", he concludes, "it is still an exciting ride in an eco-friendly racer", and, "it's like Doctor Who for grown-ups".
