= List of Hustle characters =

Hustle is a British television comedy–drama series made by Kudos Film & Television for BBC One in the United Kingdom.

== Michael Stone ==
Michael Stone, (Played by Adrian Lester) who uses the alias Mickey Bricks, was the show's principal character from Series 1 to 3 and 5 to 8.

Mickey is a professional grifter who makes money by setting up long cons. He is intelligent, charismatic and quick-witted. Although he works with Albert Stroller, who is one of his mentors, Mickey is the leader of his "crew" (team) of grifters. Mickey did not return in the fourth series, instead he led a con off-screen in Australia. He later, however, returned in the fifth.

=== Background ===
Mickey has a strong dislike of being told what to do or having a job. These feelings appear to stem from his childhood. In series one, he revealed that his father was an ordinary, law-abiding citizen whose only dream was to retire when he was 60, until he dropped dead of natural causes three days before his 60th birthday. Having watched his father play by the rules all his life and being destroyed, he has a strong hatred of people who simply use the system to make themselves rich at the expense of others. Mickey therefore always selects marks whom he has reason to dislike; by making his motive personal, he stops himself from ever making the con about the money. The gang states that their first rule is, "You can't cheat an honest man," not simply because they should not, but since those being conned are greedy and dishonest, they are less likely to over-analyse anything that would make them rich. In that sense, Mickey is not hypocritical because he does not steal from "old ladies"; all his marks are either blatantly dishonest or simply coldly dismissive of others – he stole a man's credit card after hearing him attempt to convince his staff to only pay Eastern Europeans £2.50 an hour. On at least two occasions he has also masterminded cons where innocent people gain more than the gang themselves (Although the gang still made a profit). At the same time, however, Mickey has no qualms with staying in hotels without paying or doing anything about his bar tab.

=== Career ===
Most people consider Mickey to be one of the finest grifters alive. He has never been charged with grifting (his only incarceration was for a completely non-related crime – assault on his ex-wife's boyfriend with a baseball bat). He has three weaknesses – loyalty, his extraordinary ego, and his hatred of being told what to do by anyone. He is a unique con artist because he does not think like a normal person; it is impossible to second-guess him. He gives the impression of being spontaneous, but everything is planned and precise. He puts together complicated and seemingly unrelated events, impossible to unravel, but all related to the big con. He greatly enjoys high stakes. He has attempted several grifts – such as trying to con an amnesic who saw through their first con before he lost his memory by 're-doing' the original scam, or using the same con on four different marks at once – simply because people say that it is impossible. He often removes things from people's pockets and on one occasion drives off in a gentleman's car after convincing him he is a valet, but he frequently insists he is "not a thief". His cons often reflect this, as on several occasions he makes it appear as if a theft has taken place when the "stolen" objects are simply hidden or moved.

=== Personal life ===
In addition to his crew, Mickey is also friends with various other grifters. However, he does not seem to have any non-grifter friends, although he was married once. He has previously stated that as a grifter you should never have "anything in your life that you can't walk away from in a second". His marriage ended after his wife had an affair. Mickey beat up the man responsible and was sent to prison for three years, returning to the streets in the first episode.

Several episodes have suggested a past relationship with fellow team member Stacie Monroe. In the episode, "A Touch of Class", Mickey breaks one of his cardinal rules by having an affair with the target of a con, which resulted in the con going awry and the wrong victim being hit when the original mark tricks them into going after an innocent man.

Later on, Mickey appears to be rather taken with newcomer, Emma Kennedy, flirting with her on occasion. However, after Sean Kennedy, Emma's brother shows hostility toward Mickey concerning his intentions towards his sister, Mickey reviews their relationship. Mickey and Emma decide that continuing would only cause problems, so they end it. Despite this, references to the feelings they had or still have are made until the very end of the series.

=== Departure ===
In Series 4, Mickey had left to take part in a con in Australia to sell the Sydney Opera House. Danny Blue took over as leader, with Billy Bond filling the resulting gap. Mickey appeared to call Danny at the end of the Series Four Finale, but the audience never saw Mickey; they heard Danny say "Sorry, bit busy, can I call you back?" and then hang up. (Much to the annoyance of the group, as they were currently stuck on a sinking inflatable raft and thought that Mickey might have been able to suggest something useful.)

=== Return ===
The con in Australia succeeds but Mickey loses the money while attempting to escape the police. After stealing the uniform of a Naval Commander, Mickey returns to the UK where he discovers his team has split up and has gone their separate ways. He then manages to bring the remaining members of the team – Ash Morgan and Albert Stroller, although Albert briefly served as an occasional advisor while in prison – back together, aided by new members Emma and Sean, to help him start a new string of cons within the city of London. At the show's conclusion, he retires after faking his death to escape with his share of almost 10 million pounds his last mark was tricked into investing on the London Stock Exchange.

== Ashley Morgan ==
Ashley Morgan, (played by Robert Glenister) known simply as Ash to his own crew, and "Three Socks" Morgan to the wider grifting circle, is a seasoned grifter, and the team's "fixer". He got the nickname while serving an 18-month prison sentence when a short-con known as 'The Flop' he pulled on an insurance broker went wrong. While in prison, he would 'go into the shower with 3 socks', suggesting he is a well endowed man. Ash is prone to talk about the working man and people making an honest living.

As a "fixer", it is Ash's role to ensure to get anything the team needs to carry out a con. He possesses considerable technical expertise and can hack into CCTV, security systems, phone lines and computer servers. He is also tasked with building websites to convince marks of the legitimacy of any fake business and will fabricate any props and small electronic gadgets, such as bugs and phone taps. His failures are few and cause his friends some surprises when they occur. He also has many contacts for more general items, from fake IDs and forged items to cars and hotel rooms. In Series 4, the gang needed £30,000 worth of roubles to con a caviar shop owner. The mark was having trouble getting that amount anywhere, whereas Ash felt insulted that Danny even asked if he could locate them at short notice.

As well as being the fixer, Ash is an excellent grifter in general, able to play the part of various characters easily. Despite being mild-mannered, he also acts as the team's "heavy", intimidating others with considerable menace. It has been hinted in several episodes that Ash was "tasty" (slang for a good fighter) in his younger days, and often the threat of him becoming violent is enough to defuse situations where the team need protection.

It was revealed in one episode that Ash was one of two candidates for Mickey's Fixer, the other being a notorious grifter called Benny. However, although Benny was the more skilled grifter, capable of playing other roles such as the roper, Mickey chose Ash because he was a better team player who would keep his word.

Although his age gives the impression that he is the second-most-experienced team member, Ash has stated more than once that he is not interested in leadership, recognising his niche and remaining within that area even when the group votes for a new leader during Mickey's absence. In the absence of a leader, Ash ends up running short cons rather than assembling a team of his own. Even when he was temporarily put in charge, he tended to subtly rely on Mickey for inspiration rather than exclusively coming up with his own idea.

He often falls back on using a skull fracture he obtained in a bar room brawl many years ago to play a con known as "The Flop". He steps out in front of careless drivers, gets hit and acts badly injured, wearing a padded coat to avoid real damage. A hospital x-ray then shows the fracture and the driver's insurance pays out. His ex-wife June also used to perform the con, but eventually suffered brain damage from the impacts. Ash gives a lot of his earnings to funding her treatment. When the gang heard about this, they decided to all contribute to her medical expenses. He gives his date of birth as 21 July 1960, and in the final episode states that he has known Mickey for around 20 years. He is the only character to appear in every episode.

== Albert Stroller ==
Played by Robert Vaughn.

Albert is an elderly American who acts as the group roper; his role is to identify targets ("marks") and lead them to the inside man. His distinctive style exudes the kind of dignified professionalism that wealthy, unsuspecting marks trust implicitly, making him the ideal man to rope them in for the serious score. As a result, he is a member of numerous establishments where the very wealthy can be found – private gentlemen's clubs, casinos, top hotels and restaurants are regular haunts for Albert and his targets. He is friends with many wealthy people under numerous aliases. Albert was Mickey's mentor for long cons; his lessons encouraged Mickey to develop his eye for detail.

He is a master of cold reading – a technique often used by mentalists, fortune tellers, psychics, and mediums to determine details about another person to convince them that the reader knows much more about a subject than they do. Even without prior knowledge, a practised cold reader can quickly obtain a great deal of information about the subject by carefully analyzing body language, clothing or fashion, hairstyle, and manner of speech. This ability helps Albert get close to his marks quickly.

Although born in America, he was stationed in North London during World War II, where he fell madly in love with a local girl, Lily Cooper. A few weeks later, he had to evacuate the base and didn't have the time to get word to Lily. He wrote her a letter and posted it as soon as he could, but received no reply. After the war, he came back to London to look for her, only to see her at the church as she was getting married.

He fled from the United States in the 1970s. Originally, he was a shoe salesman in the Midwest until the workforce was laid off. To secure a decent redundancy package, Albert conned the company out of $60,000 and shared it among his former co-workers. He reputedly enjoyed the experience so much that he became a grifter and moved to Las Vegas to work the marks there by day, and the casinos at night. However, soon all the casinos became wise to the grifters and banned them from even entering their premises. Albert left for the UK shortly afterwards. One of his partners-in-crime in Las Vegas was Joey Pepper, and together they would work the Shoe-switch scam. However, Joey was once caught doing the switch and was almost killed by the Casino security.

At one point, he fell in love with a woman called Susan, to the extent that they were planning to get a house together, but Susan left after Albert lost the money they had raised in a card game. When Susan reappeared years later, she revealed that she had discovered that she was pregnant with Albert's child shortly after leaving him, but never returned because she didn't think that Albert's lifestyle was suitable for a child, and she did not want Albert to change for her sake. Albert was reunited with Susan and their daughter Kathleen at the end of the seventh series – where he also learned that he had grandchildren – but he missed a chance to say goodbye when he got caught up in a poker game to celebrate the gang's latest victory.

He was "out-grifted" once by Victor Maher, before joining with Mickey Bricks and the rest of the crew. However, he had spoken about Maher to Mickey before Maher turns up in Series 1 Episode 4 trying to out-grift Mickey.

He cannot go to Indonesia as he sold the air force some fighter jets in the '70s, and they still haven't arrived.

Stroller is a habitual gambler; he is also a habitual card cheat. These two habits combined have proven to be a weakness. During the first series, he was hospitalized after receiving a severe beating after being caught cheating by a casino owner. During the second series, he briefly dealt with a bout of depression after the death of a close friend caused him to question his own lifestyle. In the fifth series premiere, it was revealed that Albert was serving two years in prison for cheating in a casino, but he stated that he was enjoying the rest, and set Mickey and Ash up with new team members Emma and Sean Kennedy (albeit by setting them up so that each duo thought they were conning the other as a mark), subsequently being released several months early on parole for good behaviour after the team manipulated a judge into thinking Albert knew the location of a lost treasure, while Albert himself conned an unsympathetic member of the parole board into releasing him.

His birthdate is 3 June 1933, however, this may not be true as previously mentioned he was stationed in London during WW2 which would make him 12 years old in 1945.

== Danny Blue ==
Played by Marc Warren.

=== Background and joining the crew ===
Danny grew up in a family of career criminals; when he was 17, his uncle used him as a lookout while he and his crew robbed a casino in Windsor. They cleaned the place out. It was a professional job and they took the CCTV tapes with them. Although after watching them go in and out of prison throughout his youth he ran away, determined not to go straight, but to be a better criminal. Escaping to London, he became a master "dip", then moved up to the short con and mastered that as well. Egotistical and ambitious, Danny is determined not just to be good but to be the best and sought out the crew of confidence men run by Mickey Bricks to learn and master the long con.

=== Personality ===
The most recent addition to Stone's crew after literally talking his way into the group in the middle of a con in progress, he is a sometimes careless but brilliant con artist said by veteran con artist Albert Stroller to have great "grift sense" and possibly be destined to be the best con artist in the world—something Danny is all too ready to believe, his ego being the greatest weakness he has yet to overcome. In contrast to Mickey's step-by-step planning of the long con, Danny tends to rely more on impulse, most of his cons being based around him establishing the original idea and working towards that goal while compensating for any problems that might arise when they do, as opposed to Mickey preparing various contingency plans for possible problems.

In the 4th episode of the first series, Danny kissed Stacie while they were alone in the apartment after spending the day together- although neither knew it, Mickey had wanted Stacie to keep Danny occupied after a crooked ex-cop blackmailed Mickey by threatening to arrest Danny for his role in a casino heist-, but she rejected him. Danny accused her of only having eyes for Mickey, and the pair momentarily fell out. However, they later reconciled in the same episode. In subsequent episodes, there was suggested mutual attraction between the pair, most notably in the second episode of Season 2. However, this was never developed further

=== Taking over as leader ===
During Mickey's absence in series 4, Danny took over the leadership of the group. Despite hoping to hire a "fit bird" as Mickey's replacement, he eventually gave the go-ahead for Billy Bond, a short con artist, who acted very much like Danny had on the first episode, to join instead. Although he lacked Mickey's ability to plan ahead for all possible contingencies- to the extent that Albert had to come up with a plan to fake the gang's death after they robbed a notorious casino owner-, Danny's style of leadership was nevertheless effective; during one con, Danny deliberately discarded a highly expensive bottle of wine by pouring the contents down the sink to convince the mark that their characters had no idea of the value of the wine that was allegedly in the cellar of the house they wanted to trick her into buying.

=== Departure and return ===
In the first episode of the fifth series of Hustle, Mickey returned to the UK after losing the money that he had made "selling" the Sydney Opera House. He then returned to London and tried to get his old crew together, yet Albert was locked in prison, and Ash had gone solo doing small cons and bets in bars. When Mickey rejoined Ash, he informed him that Danny and Stacie had decided to stay in the States to pull off some more cons following their success in the fourth series. Although Stacie initially claimed that Danny had run off with a cocktail waitress to escape her husband the last time she saw him, Danny made a surprise appearance in the final episode of the show, portraying a hitman employed to murder Mickey's crew, shooting at them with blanks to fool the mark- Stacie having stolen the card with the real hitman's number and replacing the number with Danny's-, before revealing his identity and leaving with the other six members of the cast at the end.

== Stacie Monroe ==
Played by Jaime Murray. Stacie is the only female member of a team-come-family of "long con" artists before Emma and Sean Kennedy join.

=== Background and personality ===
She was married to a short-con artist, Jake Henry (Max Beesley). Stacie became a grifter through him. They both worked together playing the short con 'The Badger' which involves Stacie playing the working girl who would pick up a mark, and then Jake would burst in as the irate pimp or boyfriend and threaten to tell the mark's wife. Stacie and Jake were married for several years but the marriage ended after he left her, taking their house and money, leaving her with nothing more than a mouldy piece of cheese, a Phil Collins CD and a plant (her ex appears as the subject of a con during the second series). It is suggested that she once had a romantic relationship with the group's leader, Michael Stone. Michael helped her after Jake left her. One first-season episode also suggested a possible attraction to the newest member of the group, Danny Blue (this theme continued in the second-season episode "Confessions" in which the two pretend to be engaged). The third episode of the third season reveals that she has a high level of mathematical ability, as she is shown calculating a high square root value in her head.

In creating the series, Tony Jordan realised that the principal characters could not have any friends or family outside the crew and therefore sought to create a nominal family with Stacie providing the role of substitute mother/wife. However, in the second series, the crew help Danny's grandmother. In the third series, they con a newspaper editor because he inadvertently caused a friend of Stacie's to attempt suicide by implying that she had embezzled money from the charity she worked for. She is sometimes demonstrated as the most compassionate member of the crew, twice leaving some of the money acquired in the latest con to people she had befriended during the con itself, and showing genuine relief when she learned that Eddie—the owner of the bar where the team regularly drink—was safe after they had been led to believe that he had been taken hostage as part of a revenge action against them. (Although Eddie, unaware that he had ever been believed to be in danger, assumed that this was part of another con.)

=== Position in the crew ===
Her official role is the banker and she has sole control and responsibility for the crew's finances. During the cons themselves, she usually takes on a variety of roles depending on need, ranging from a sultry vamp to a nerdy museum keeper, to help weave the web of deception. Her sex appeal is often used as a distraction, though she is often hesitant to rely upon it.

=== Departure ===
In the first episode of the fifth series, Mickey returned to the UK after losing the money he had made 'selling' the Sydney Opera House. He then returned to London and tried to get his old crew together, yet Albert was locked in prison and Ash had gone solo doing small cons and bets in bars. When Mickey rejoined Ash, he informed him that Danny and Stacie had decided to stay in the US to pull off some more cons following their success in the fourth series.

=== Return ===
Stacie returned for the final episode of the 2012 series, which was also the final episode of the show. She became accidentally caught up in Micky's con while conning the same mark herself- working as the mark's broker while he was looking for investments with the intention of taking a few thousand from him when he made his deposit-, but joined forces with Micky's gang by enlisting the help of the also-returning Danny Blue to help pull the con off, recruiting Danny as a fake hitman to help the gang fake their deaths. Stacie then drove off with the other six members of the cast at the show's conclusion.

== Eddie ==
Played by Rob Jarvis, (series 1–8), the owner and proprietor of the eponymous Eddie's Bar where the group often plan cons. Fully aware of the group and their dealings, he usually adopts a "hear no evil, see no evil, speak no evil" attitude. The petty grifts played on him by the crew whenever they want to get out of paying their bar tab, make a point to someone, or are just plain bored, are a recurring theme through the series, and often serve as foreshadowing for a trick that will be important later in the episode. Through these tricks and mingling with Mickey's team, he has acquired a basic knowledge of cons. A Liverpudlian migrant to the London area, he speaks with a strong Scouse accent. Eddie stated in the second episode of the seventh season that he had been married in the past, although he appeared now to be either separated or divorced.

However, despite being skimmed by them several times, a certain financial trust exists between Eddie and the group. For instance, Eddie once lent them £4,000 to perform a con and it was paid back fully. The gang often pay Eddie their debts (often before heading on holiday at the end of a series) and provide monetary assistance if need be. Eddie occasionally helps the gang by posing as a grifter or acting as an informant; his information and knowledge often turn out to be helpful and sometimes avert disaster. Eddie is close enough to the crew to ask for a favour, and the team is also sometimes quite protective of him (e.g. not discussing some of their more dangerous schemes in the bar to ensure his safety). Furthermore, some of the targets in the series have been conned to settle scores on Eddie's behalf.

As such, Eddie might be considered an unofficial "sixth member" of the family.

== Billy Bond ==
Played by Ashley Walters during series 4. Billy enters the crew the same way that Danny did – as a rookie, with a natural hustling instinct and a master of the short con, but with little knowledge or experience of the long con. Portrayed as an astute and likeable character despite prior involvement in drug dealing and street gangs, he knows that his inclusion within the crew is his chance to make it big.

Walters did not return for the fifth series, which instead marked the return of Adrian Lester; the final whereabouts of his character were never explained at all. In the first episode of the fifth season, when Mickey was trying to reassemble a crew, Ash mentioned that Danny and Stacie were still in America, but made no mention of Billy. In the last episode of the final series, although both Danny & Stacie returned, Billy did not, nor was there any mention of him.

== Emma and Sean Kennedy ==
Kelly Adams played Emma and Matt Di Angelo played Sean Kennedy during series 5–8.

Replacing the departed characters of Danny Blue and Stacie Monroe, Emma and Sean Kennedy are brother and sister, put into foster care after their mother died, a year after their father ran off. The Kennedy siblings had been living on the streets since Sean was nine, and Emma was fourteen, having run away from their foster family, they survived only through Emma's quick hands and manipulative abilities. While they understand first-hand the selfishness and greed of the world around them, the Kennedy siblings are less-experienced grifters and newcomers to the long con.

Before Albert is imprisoned, prior to series five, he is pickpocketed by Emma. Impressed by her abilities, Albert takes her under his wing. Sean originally never wished to be a grifter, unlike his sister, and was set on going to Drama school when he had the money, which he and Emma were raising through their cons. The first episode of series five, in which Stone returns to find Albert in prison and attempts to complete a con with only a two-man team, turns out to be a setup by Albert, who has separately encouraged Sean and Emma to try and con Mickey and Ash. Both groups successfully escape with each other's "money", which turns out to be fake. Mickey and Ash save Emma and Sean from a past mark by giving them the tools to fake their deaths and also manage to scare the past mark into giving them the money taken by the Kennedys.

Eventually, Sean enjoys being part of Mickey's crew to the point where he abandons his dreams of being an actor. Emma Kennedy proves to be a natural, unlike her brother, and her looks are used on many occasions in their cons to manipulate men into doing what she wants, however much she dislikes it. Sean's first con with the crew does not go well for him; he ends up passing out drunk when sent out on a fact-finding mission for Mickey, though he displays an impressive photographic memory even when intoxicated, and his information regarding the marks firing their PR company allows Mickey to set up his plan. Mickey then intends to use Sean to introduce Mickey and Emma as members of a new company, but one of the marks spikes his orange juice, resulting in Sean ending up drunk again. Emma is angered when she discovers this, and so has a drinking contest with the mark, which she wins. Sean is demoralised following the incident, but Mickey quickly helps him to dust himself off and carry on with the con.

Subsequent episodes focus on the siblings' development as con artists, and some back-story exposition; their father Rex Kennedy (played by Danny Webb) is targeted as a mark using a buried treasure scam in the episode 'The Father of Jewels'. Emma's childhood sweetheart appears in series seven episode two. However, he proves a disappointment to Emma, thanks in part to the input of Mickey Bricks, who is a romantic interest for Emma since her first appearance, before they knew each other's real identities. Sean and Emma's mutual protectiveness concerning each other is also an occasional theme, especially in the episode 'Politics' when Sean shows his protectiveness concerning Emma. Emma is also characterized as the member of the gang who is arguably the friendliest with Eddie, and the least likely to take advantage of him.

== Contacts ==
- Neil Cooper (played by Tom Mannion) is another con artist who helps Mickey in Series 1, Episode 1. He impersonates a police officer named Martin DePalma to head the investigation into the crew.
- Tip Jones (played by Brian Pettifer) is a forger of classical art who is extremely skilled but not trustworthy. When the crew call on him he is faking being brain-damaged to avoid an existing charge of forgery. He forges a Mondrian painting for the crew to sell as an original but attempts to swindle them at the last moment. However, this attempted treachery leads the crew to turn the tables on Tip and ensure that he is arrested by police officers suspicious of his brain damage claims.
- Samuel Richards (played by Richard Harrington) is a thief who means to steal a diamond taken from his family by a greedy banker, an event which led his father to kill himself. He teams up with the crew when the Head of Security at Moore's Bank tries to force the crew to help catch him.
- Ray Fordham is a grifter known as 'Scottish Ray' – a nickname he earned after taking a £50,000 down payment on Edinburgh Castle. He tries to recruit Danny Blue into a new crew he is setting up.
- Harry Holmes (played by Ronald Pickup) is a fellow grifter who tries to con property developer Howard Jennings. However, Jennings has seen through him from the beginning and has taped all of their conversations, which he hands over to the police. Despite sharing a name, he is not connected to Martin Kemp's character in the eighth series.
- Adam Rice (played by Paul Nicholls) is a thief regarded by the police as "The Ghost" due to his ability to disappear from the crime scene or elude people trying to follow him. The crew try to enlist his help in stealing an original Hans Christian Andersen manuscript after being blackmailed by corrupt police officer DCI York, who wants Rice imprisoned. Though initially hesitant to join a team he does not know well, he is attracted by the idea of working with Ash and helping the crew. Rice eventually joins them for the heist, though is accidentally injured by Danny during it. As the crew take down DCI York, Rice escapes scot free and offers to work with the crew again whenever they wish to do a heist.
- Archie (played by Tony Rohr) is involved in horse racing and is able to supply the crew with a horse and "paint" another horse during the con in Series 4, episode 2. He obviously has a history with the group – he says he is "always nervous around grifters".
- Cyclops (played by Bill Bailey), so named for his thick-lensed glasses, is one of the crew's main sources of underworld information in Series 5 to 8. He normally frequents a greasy-spoon café and often propositions Emma, with little success.
- Joseph "Joey" Pepper is an American who used to be a grifter. He was once partners with Albert Stroller when he was in Las Vegas. After Albert left for Britain in the 1970s, Joey eventually took a job as a security consultant in a Las Vegas casino. He helps the crew escape after stealing $5 million from a casino.

== Marks ==
=== Series 1 ===
- Peter Williamson (played by James Laurenson) is London businessman. He regularly makes the top 500 rich list but is greedy and will cross the street to pick up a one-pound coin. The crew lure him in with the promise of a guaranteed, but an illegal, way of tripling his money.
- DS Terri Hodges (played by Liz May Brice) is a senior officer within the Fraud Squad at the London Metropolitan Police. She has a particular vendetta against Michael Stone, having been tricked by him more than once.
- DCI Mullens (played by Ken Bones) is the Head of the Fraud Squad at the Metropolitan Police in the opening episode. He oversees an operation to arrest the crew as they attempt to con Peter Williamson. However, Mullens' investigation is fatally compromised when it's revealed that DI Martin DePalma, a key officer in the investigation, was a con artist named Neil Cooper impersonating DePalma. This scandal and embarrassment make Mullens resign in disgrace and other police officers mention his fate during the series.
- Frank Gorley (played by Robert Pugh) is a renowned bully and the owner of a top London casino and hotel situated in the West End. Though brutal, he is a film fanatic, and the crew con him into investing in a classic film production, with the promise of a speaking role in the finished film.
- Meredith Gates (played by Orla Brady) is an avid art collector with a particular interest in the artist Mondrian; she has ripped off many poor struggling dealers and buyers over the years to complete her collection. The crew fake an original Mondrian and stage a bidding war for her to participate in.
- Victor Maher (played by David Calder) is the Head of Security for Moores Bank and before that he was in the Fraud Squad for 19 years. He is thrilled at taking on the best grifters in Europe and out-grifting them. He tries to force the crew into catching a known bank robber.
- Catherine Winterborn (played by Tamzin Outhwaite) is a recently divorced businesswoman who is very bitter and vengeful towards her ex-husband Steven (played by Ben Miles). Having been left with nothing after the divorce, she jumps at the opportunity to invest in a rival hotel chain organised by the crew. Even when a guilty Mickey admits the con to her, she tries to commission the crew into ruining her ex-husband's career, the team only realising that her ex is a good person after they have put the con into action.
- Arthur Bond (played by Philip Jackson) is a rich businessman who owns the biggest theme park in the North of England. Mickey and Danny "sold" him the London Eye for £100,000; when the con was exposed on the media he was ridiculed, leaving him thirsty for revenge.
- Sir Anthony Reeves (played by David Haig) was the CEO of one of the major utility companies. After some bad management decisions he was dismissed, but with a golden handshake of £500,000. The crew con him out of his money by tempting him with his two guilty pleasures – horse racing and prostitutes.

=== Series 2 ===
- Howard Jennings (played by Charlie Creed Miles) is a ruthless, young property broker in London. Considering London to be 'his city', he has taken radical steps to acquire valuable property, including running over the cat of an elderly tenant so that she would sign off on her flat. Though intelligent, he has a very bad temper – and Michael Stone is even more tempted at the prospect of conning him because he has been conned before and considers himself too smart for grifters.
- Johnny Keyes (played by Stanley Townsend) is a prominent restaurateur and celebrity chef in London but has a notorious gangland past. His restaurant, "Keyes" is a highly fashionable spot, with an eight-week waiting list for a table. Keyes also harbours deep feelings for his long-lost son, who was kidnapped at a very young age. It is by impersonating this son via Danny that the crew find their "in". His suspicious wife, Juliette (Rebecca Lacey) is less than enthusiastic about the search. However, just as Danny has succeeded with the con and manipulated him into purchasing a faked rare bottle of wine, Keyes suffers a heart attack. He dies in Danny's arms, who chooses to let him believe he is his son in his final moments. After Keyes' death, Juliette pays off Danny on the provision that she never sees her 'stepson' again.
- Trevor Speed (played by Lee Ingleby) is a short con artist whom Danny takes under his wing when they become acquainted in a pub. Danny convinces Mickey to let Trevor join their latest con against Anthony Mgube, an arms trafficker and former Nigerian government official with a hobby of collecting rare antique banknotes. While on his way to undertake the final con against Mgube, Trevor loses a faked antique banknote that the team had prepared, leading Mickey to fire him. Trevor decides to proceed with the con independently, only to find himself slyly conned out of thousands by the crew. It's revealed that Mgube was Mickey in disguise all along and that the 'con' had been set up with Trevor as the real mark, to take revenge for Trevor conning Danny's grandmother.
- DI Samantha Phillips (played by Fay Ripley) is a corrupt policewoman who threatens Eddie and blackmails the crew into cutting her in on their latest con, which is auctioning a faked rare comic book. She has a safe deposit box where she stashes all her ill-gotten gains. Despite her close surveillance and manipulative methods during the con, she is outwitted by the crew, who frame her for stealing the real comic book and expose her corruption, leading to her arrest.
- Jake Henry (played by Max Beesley) is Stacie's estranged husband and used to be a short con artist with her. However, in 2000, he disappeared with their savings and fled to Amsterdam, leaving her only a few assorted items in their otherwise empty flat. He went on to earn money by playing poker professionally and gained a reputation as one of the best players around.

=== Series 3 ===
- Benny Frazier (played by Mel Smith) owns 16 licensed pubs and clubs across the East End. He is also a major importer of alcohol through his company, Benny Frazier Import/Export Company Limited, but he uses the alcohol shipments as a cover for people trafficking to smuggle in Eastern Europeans. Violent and ruthless, Frazier also has a reputation for brutality. The police have been after him for a while but they can never get anything on him. The crew get to him through his 17-year-old son, a hopeful but talentless rapper, keen to hit the big time. Just as the con is about to be successful, Benny discovers the team's true identities as they had previously tried to con his father-in-law, who recognized Albert. Mickey and Danny are viciously beaten by Benny and his men as a result, leading Ash to save the day with a group of fake policemen. Benny and his family flee the country to Malaga, believing they're on the run from the law.
- Charles Cornfoot (played by Terence Harvey) and Quenton Cornfoot (played by Stephen Campbell Moore) are bankers working within their ancestral merchant bank, Cornfoots. Quenton is the Head of Corporate Finance, charged with roping in clients to invest, while Charles is the Head of Trading and oversees asset management. They are both extremely greedy and immoral, frequently breaking many laws and ethics. The crew come to target the Cornfoots at the urging of James Whitaker Wright III, a legendary fellow grifter, because the Cornfoot's ancestors financially ruined Wright's ancestor in the early 20th century. They set up a fake oil company to float on the stock exchange and manipulate the Cornfoots into shorting the stock on the futures market beforehand so that the crew can secretly buy all the shares. Thus, with Cornfoots unable to fulfil their regulatory obligations, the crew blackmail them into paying a large financial settlement of £2 million. However, Wright cons the crew by faking his death and escaping with all the money in the aftermath.
- Kulvinder Samar (played by Silas Carson) is a ruthless and very wealthy businessman who owns a network of sweatshops making counterfeit designer clothes. When he was younger, he wanted to become a Bollywood actor but was denied by his domineering father who wanted him to take over the family business. Still, he maintains a passionate interest in Bollywood films, which provides the way in for the crew as they set up a fake film for Kulvinder to invest in. Midway through the con, Kulvinder works out their plan but sustains a head injury in a car accident. This gives him short-term amnesia, meaning he forgets that the crew are con artists. It also results in personality changes that make him regretful of his immoral past. After attempting to con Kulvinder for a second time using the same con, the crew ultimately abandon the con on moral grounds, as Kulvinder is now a 'good' man. However, it is revealed to the audience that Kulvinder does remember they are con artists but as the con attempt has given him an epiphany that he should return to India and train as an actor, he seeks no revenge against the crew and lets them walk free believing he still has amnesia.
- Francis Owen (played by Kenneth Cranham) and Tim Millen (played by Paul Kaye) are two unscrupulous, immoral journalists working for the Weekend World, a tabloid newspaper. Francis is the ruthless Editor in Chief and Tim is his chief reporter. Both men have no qualms about printing libellous stories so long as they sell newspapers, nor do they care about unethical tactics. When a poorly sourced story about one of Stacey's friends, Emily Shaw, causes Emily to try and commit suicide, the crew decide to con Francis and Tim for revenge. As the Weekend World focuses extensively on stories about the British royal family, they concoct a fake story about the Queen Mother having died of tuberculosis in 1941 and being replaced by a doppelganger so as not to disrupt British morale during the Second World War. During the con, Francis remains highly suspicious of the story. However, the crew are able to convince both journalists after manipulating a DNA test to corroborate their claim. After publishing the story and having it exposed as fake, Owen and Millen are both disgraced and fired thanks to secret deals Mickey struck with rival editor Martin Townsend and MI5, both of whom were interested in their downfalls.
- DCI Matthew York (played by Ian Puleston-Davies) is an ambitious, corrupt police officer who enjoys the publicity from big arrests and does whatever he can to ensure that happens. York plants cocaine on the crew and imprisons them on drug charges to blackmail them into helping him entrap notorious thief Adam Rice, who plans to steal a valuable manuscript within the jurisdiction of a rival police detective, DCI Neil Cooper. York holds Albert in custody to ensure the crew does his bidding and assumes he has all bases covered. However, before and after the planned manuscript heist, the crew outwit York and ensures he disgraces himself in front of DCI Cooper. York ultimately faces an internal inquiry into his suspected corruption, led by Cooper.

=== Series 4 ===
- Anthony Westley (played by Robert Wagner) is a Texan who made his fortune in industrial fastenings. He sold his company in 1999 to property developers knowing they were going to close down his factory and put his people out of work, but netting a profit of nearly $30 million. He is brash, single-minded, mean and also corrupt. When he was in business, he bribed key members of the US government to win defence contracts. He is also obsessed with the movie business, specifically movie memorabilia.
- Veronica Powell (played by Patricia Hodge) is the owner of Morecombe Hall Nursing Home, who has made most of her money in property. The nursing home was family-run for 12 years but was recently bought by Powell. After running it for two months she decided to whack up the fees and four months after that the fees have trebled from when she first took over. The elderly residents have to sell their property to pay for it although she convinces them to sell through her own auction house. She forgets to invite any serious bidders, buys the lot herself for next to nothing, and sells them on later. She also gets back her money when she collects the fees for the nursing home. She is also a real wine buff and will happily pay thousands to add the right vintage to her collection.
- Lady Clarissa Bartwell (played by Frances Barber) married her first husband for his money and title and changed her name from Carol to Clarissa. However, her husband finally saw through her and left, leaving her with a generous settlement. Despite this, she is a con artist and rips off charities. Every charity she holds events for receives only a fraction of what the event makes – the rest goes to her. She also rips off unwitting celebrities in the name of charity, all in cash.
- Johnny Maranzano (played by Chris Tardio) is the son of the late, great Frank Maranzano, a mafia boss and owner of the Oceanic Casino in Las Vegas. Frank Maranzano was found at Las Vegas international airport with three heads in a duffle bag. The only two things Johnny seems to care about are himself and money. He has no regard for his staff and constantly abuses them – verbally and sometimes physically. He is not above killing anyone who crosses him and has people on his payroll everywhere in Las Vegas and LA. Johnny's pride and joy is the biggest slot machine in the world called Big Daddy which is in his casino. He created it in memory of his father.

=== Series 5 ===
- Sara Naismith (Kelly Adams) made her fortune in dubious overseas property deals. She started by buying beachfront land along the Black Sea coast once the Soviet Union crumbled, next it was tendering for re-building programmes in China after the earthquake. She left China in scandal amidst revelations of her bribing officials to avoid building regulations. She thinks the recession in Europe means she can make a fortune in the money markets. She has an assistant called Aaron (Matt Di Angelo), who has been with her since September 2008 and has a degree in Business Studies. Note: Naismith and Aaron were future team members Emma and Sean in disguise as arranged by Albert to con Mickey and Ash, whilst Mickey and Ash were conning them. The four became a team at the end of the episode.
- William Dagmar is an intelligent, maverick trader on the stock market and the owner of Dagmar Associates based in London. He was one of the first people to get into Google and eBay, and among the first to get out of Enron and Northern Rock. The reason for his success though is insider trading through his contacts. Note: This was the cover story for Michael Stone who was in disguise when he conned Sara Naismith and Aaron (Emma and Sean Kennedy).
- Carlton Wood and Harry Fielding run City Prime Associates in London specialising in intellectual property; trademarks, patents, and copyrights usually for high-end technology. Wood is the business brain and Fielding does the technical stuff.

After the group conned them, they returned in the Series Five finale trying to set up a situation where they could con the group out of their money in revenge, but the attempt was a complete failure from the beginning. Mickey subsequently hired other grifters to participate in the 'plot' and take back their money, allowing the plan to continue simply for the thrill of seeing their faces when they realised what had happened.

- Sir Anthony Kent (played by Tim McInnerny) is a high court judge in London. Educated at Eton and Cambridge, Kent is the last of the old guard, out of touch and proud of it. He has a reputation for handing down the harshest sentences the law allows him. He has a house in Chelsea, an even bigger one in the Cotswolds, and fat expenses claims. He only cares about the crimes, verdicts, and sentences and never speaks to the press. He is known to have broken the rules once; in one of the cases he tried, he was promised gold in return for a shorter sentence. However, before Kent could get his hands on the gold, the prisoner is stabbed to death a month into his term.
- Toby Baxter is the only son of self-made ball bearings magnate Reginald Baxter. After his parents died when he was 27, he inherited the family business which he sold almost immediately for a reported £100 million. After the sale he retired and is obsessed with one thing – collecting love diamonds, which he keeps in a high-tech vault under his house. He is also a recluse and never leaves home.
- Pinky Byrne started in Hatton Garden as a runner, but soon worked out he could make more money as a tracer on the outside, using his knowledge of the industry on the inside. Byrne's a killer with no conscience but that is why he is good – he won't stop at anything. The last bloke who grassed him up was taken to a Halal butchers by Pinky who cut off his wedding tackle and made him eat it.
- Rhona Christie MP is a career politician. She took a marginal seat promising to speak up for the man and woman in the street although has become someone of influence in the construction industry. She picks projects to fast-track and then makes them happen to bypass planners and environmentalists and has a lot of influence. She can turn a worthless property into prime real estate, taking bribes from property developers to de-list buildings.
- Alfred Thomas Baron is the eldest son of the Duke and Duchess of Derbyshire, who can trace his ancestry back to Henry VIII. He spends his time mostly gambling, sleeping with models and doing dodgy business ventures. He believes that if people are stupid enough to lose their houses then it is the fault of the state. He even believes that there should some sort of compulsory euthanasia programme starting with the unemployed, those on benefits, and then moving on to the over 65s. He is an acquaintance of Carlton Wood and Harry Fielding and is used in their plan to con Michael Stone in revenge for their lost money, but the plan ends in disaster due to his stupidity, as well as the fact Mickey had been manipulating the situation right from the start.

=== Series 6 ===
- Sir Edmund "Piggy" Richardson is the ex-boss of a bank he brought to the verge of collapse in 2009 and needed bailing out by the British government. He has become one of the most hated corporate sharks in the UK because he walked away with an annual pension of £500,000 earning him the nickname of "Piggy" and vilification by the press and the public due to the fact that half the people that worked for him lost their jobs.
- Liability Finch is an ex-grifter who has become a thief. However, he is a bumbling, hapless crook hence the name and is just not cut out to be a crook. He considers Mickey Bricks to be grifting royalty and wonders what it would be like to work beside him every day and used to work with Ash Morgan back in the mid-'80s working short cons until Ash saw sense. They once did the pigeon drop six times in one day down in Brighton but their last victim was an off-duty policewoman and they did time. He also helped Ash with the flop where Ash would perform the flop and then Finch would pretend to be a doctor passing by. He now lives in a council flat in London. He's not strictly a mark in this episode, as he's a fellow grifter (albeit not a very good one), however, he is constantly misled by the crew so that he does what they want him to do, to enable their con to work out.
- Luke Baincross is 51 years old and in 2001 he inherited Baincross Hall; a 48-room mansion in Surrey. He supports two ex-wives, soon to be three, and has a champagne lifestyle without ever having done a day's work. He recently opened up Baincross Hall to the public. The Baincross family made their fortune in the Indian silk trade in the 18th century, and as a result have one of the world's largest collections of Indian art that is worth millions, including a life-size jewel-encrusted gold tiger.
- Rex Kennedy is the father of Emma and Sean Kennedy. He is a respected businessman in his adopted home of Melbourne, Australia from where he runs a successful property-developing company that has an extensive portfolio throughout Australia, and on several sites in Europe including one in London. In 1987, when Emma was five and Sean was three years old, he emigrated to Melbourne, Australia, leaving Emma and Sean in the care of their mother. His reason for leaving was that he figured they would be better off without him, so he told them he was going on a business trip and that he would bring Sean back a toy Tracy Island. That was the last they saw of him. A year after his departure his wife died, and Emma and Sean went into care. This character development causes a minor continuity error, based on an earlier episode suggesting a five-year age gap between Emma and Sean, while here they are stated as with a difference of only two years.
- Mervyn Lloyd (played by Daniel Mays) is a dishonest 'entrepreneur' who conned Mickey when he sold him a useless mobile phone. As a result, Mickey lost his mojo (briefly passed onto barman Eddie) and the gang agreed to con Mervyn so the luck curse could be reversed. They had him believe that Albert is launching a great new product set to make millions of pounds. Mervyn falls for their scam and is left in a state of shock when the product prototype is sent to him (after investing in it). Mickey's mojo returned, as well as Eddie's bad luck.

=== Series 7 ===
- Wendy Stanton (played by Anna Chancellor) is the head of Model Devotion, a modelling agency. A failed model herself, Stanton sought to gain access to the 'big-time' as an agency head but had never made it, simply working in low-end catalogues, made even worse when her ex-partner Betty Greenacre's company received a contract for Milan Fashion Week. She was also known to con aspiring models out of approximately £900 each by claiming that she needed the money to set up a portfolio for the models, claiming that they would recoup the money on their first job, which never arrives, allowing her to keep the money for herself.
- Jeremy Garrett, Stanley Mead, and Viscount Manley are: an MP recently appointed to the Treasury who believed that chips, ketchup and lager should be taxed to recoup recent losses; a judge on the court of public decency who engaged in threesomes; and a young man who had recently inherited a large amount of money from his father, respectively. All three, along with Wendy Stanton, are conned at the same time using the Spanish Prisoner scam.
- Georgina Althorp (played by Angela Griffin) is the head of Dosh4You, a loan company with a ridiculously high-interest rate in the fine print of the contracts; most people who asked for loans from her ended up losing their homes anyway because they couldn't keep up the repayments. Having changed her name in her youth, Georgina originally studied law before going into her current business, going so far as to evict her own parents from their home.
- Marcus Wendell (played by Michael Brandon) is an American whose family have owned casinos all the way back to the Civil War in America, where his ancestors accused Charlie Stroller – Albert's great-grandfather – of cheating on their casino steamboat and threw him off the ship. Having opened his first casino in Britain, Wendell attempts to provoke the gang into trying to con him so that he can put their photos on his 'wall of grifters', where he places pictures of those he finds cheating in his casinos – although there is evidence that his standards to determine whether someone is cheating are relatively low – subsequently ruining the future career prospects of potential grifters by sending their information to all of the world's major financial institutions. However, the team are able to win the game using the table from the casino steamboat, revealing Wendell's family had rigged it and Stroller had realised the deception, hence he was framed.
- Benny is an old-time grifter who was a jack of all trades. He could pick out a mark with ease, pick a pocket with lightning speed and nearly replaced Ash as a member of the group. Even though he was an amazing grifter he thought he was better than everyone else, smarter, quicker and more devious. He held a great grudge against Mickey and his group for picking Ash instead of him and owed money to a local gang leader who threatened to kill him if the money wasn't returned with interest. He was a master con man, even managing to con Mickey out of £20,000 without him knowing it in the early days.

=== Series 8 ===
- Dexter Gold, played by Paterson Joseph, is a gold seller. He made his fortune using a company that buys gold items and jewellery from unsuspecting victims for heavily reduced prices. He gets away with it because of the fine print no one reads. The team pose as a renegade army unit to con him, and successfully take him for £500,000.
- Petre Sava, played by Peter Polycarpou, is a ruthless Eastern European art collector the team attempts to sell a fake Picasso to after hearing in the press that the work had been stolen. What they don't know, however, is that Sava was the original owner and they come unstuck when Sava kidnaps Mickey thinking the crew did steal the painting in the first place. They have had no luck in retrieving the original. Mickey is released though when Ash calls Sava and rival gangster Harry Holmes (Martin Kemp) to the same warehouse, causing them and their henchmen to fight with a fake being destroyed in the process (Sava thought that this was the real painting). Eventually. he settles for a fake created by art forger Dolly Hammond (Sheila Hancock).
- DI Sidney Fisk, played by Patrick Baladi, is a corrupt senior police detective who makes cases 'go away' providing the offenders pay him enough. Fisk's new commanding officer, Wainwright, deals with Mickey and the team to ensnare Fisk and root out corruption in her department. The team plan an elaborate con involving a fake mark to trap Fisk, which he falls for, and is recorded saying exactly how he makes cases 'go away'.
- Dean and Dana Deville, played by John Barrowman and Raquel Cassidy respectively, are a married American couple who have made their fortune by pitching fake diets and healthy lifestyle products. The team target them after a fellow grifter, Carol (Jodie Prenger), suffers a heart attack after falling for one of their fake diet plans. Mickey and Ash create a story involving a miracle diet drink being developed by a major drug manufacturer. Mickey poses as a professional thief and the Devilles pay him £250,000 to help them steal the fake product from the manufacturer, but it turns out the product is just an emetic.
- Dale Ridley, played by Mark Williams, is a disgraced '80s TV gameshow host who had a catchphrase with 'Ding Dong, That's My Song'. Now he is a ruthless property developer, tearing down sites for profit including one of Albert's old clubs. The team know the old studios that fired him are up for sale and knows he would love the chance to take revenge and knock the building down. Dale does discover he's being conned, but Mickey and the gang still walk clean away with £250,000 of his money.
- Madani Wasem, played by Abhin Galeya, is a businessman who has inherited north of £850m from his recently deceased father. Wasem travels around Europe playing the money markets but is considered incredibly dangerous by the team, not least because he employs an 'enforcer', a person who will kill or torture a victim on demand. Mickey and the team use him as their final mark and successfully walk away with £10m of his money. Danny Blue was the 'enforcer' Wasem hired to kill the team but alas, it ended happily ever after.
