= Journal of Linguistics =

- Discipline: Linguistics
- Language: English
- Edited by: Kersti Börjars, Helen de Hoop, Adam Ledgeway, Marc van Oostendorp

Publication details
- History: 1965-present
- Publisher: Cambridge University Press
- Frequency: Triannually
- Impact factor: 1.2 (2024)

Standard abbreviations
- ISO 4: J. Linguist.

Indexing
- ISSN: 0022-2267 (print); 1469-7742 (web)
- OCLC no.: 1754651

Links
- Journal homepage; Online access; Online archive

The Journal of Linguistics is a triannual peer-reviewed academic journal covering all branches of theoretical linguistics and the official publication of the Linguistics Association of Great Britain. It is published by Cambridge University Press and is edited by Kersti Börjars, Helen de Hoop, Adam Ledgeway and Marc van Oostendorp.

== History ==
The journal was established in 1965 and Sir John Lyons was its first editor (1965-1969). From 1969 until 1979, Frank R. Palmer was the editor-in-chief. Other past editors include Erik Fudge (University of Hull), Nigel Vincent (The University of Manchester), Nigel Fabb (University of Strathclyde), Caroline Heycock (University of Edinburgh), S.J. Hannahs (Newcastle University), and Robert D. Borsley (University of Essex). Current editors are Kersti Börjars (University of Oxford), Helen de Hoop (Radboud University Nijmegen), Adam Ledgeway (University of Bergamo) and Marc van Oostendorp (Radboud University Nijmegen).
