= Evening Standard British Film Awards =

British annual film awards, established 1973

- Awarded for: British and Irish film
- Country: United Kingdom
- First award: 1973
- Website: London Evening Standard British Film Awards

The Evening Standard British Film Awards were established in 1973 by London's Evening Standard newspaper. The Standard Awards is the only ceremony "dedicated to British and Irish talent", judged by a panel of "top UK critics". Each ceremony honours films from the previous year.

== 1973–1980 Winners ==
=== 1973 Winners ===
- Best Actor : Keith Michell – Henry VIII and His Six Wives
- Best Actress : Glenda Jackson – Mary, Queen of Scots
- Best Comedy : The National Health – Jack Gold
- Best Film : Ryan's Daughter – David Lean
- Best Newcomer – Actor : Simon Ward
- Best Newcomer – Actress : Lynne Frederick

=== 1974 Winners ===
- Best Actor : Michael Caine – Sleuth
- Best Actress : Glenda Jackson – A Touch of Class
- Best Comedy : The Three Musketeers – Richard Lester
- Best Film : Live and Let Die – Guy Hamilton
- Best Newcomer – Actor : Edward Fox
- Best Newcomer – Actress : Heather Wright

=== 1975 Winners ===
- Best Actor : Albert Finney – Murder on the Orient Express
- Best Actress : Wendy Hiller – Murder on the Orient Express
- Best Comedy : The Four Musketeers – Richard Lester
- Best Film : Murder on the Orient Express – Sidney Lumet
- Best Newcomer – Actor : Robin Askwith
- Best Newcomer – Actress : Jill Townsend

=== 1976 Winners ===
- Best Actor : Peter Sellers – The Return of the Pink Panther
- Best Actress : Annette Crosbie – The Slipper and the Rose
- Best Comedy : The Return of the Pink Panther – Blake Edwards
- Best Film : Aces High – Jack Gold
- Best Newcomer – Actor : Peter Firth
- Best Newcomer – Actress : Gemma Craven

=== 1977 Winners ===
- Best Actor : John Thaw – Sweeney!
- Best Actress : Billie Whitelaw – The Omen
- Best Comedy : The Pink Panther Strikes Again – Blake Edwards
- Best Film : A Bridge Too Far – Richard Attenborough
- Best Newcomer – Actor : Dennis Waterman
- Best Newcomer – Actress : Lesley-Anne Down

=== 1978 Winners ===
- Best Actor : Alec Guinness – Star Wars
- Best Actress : Nanette Newman – International Velvet
- Best Comedy : Revenge of the Pink Panther – Blake Edwards
- Best Film : Star Wars – George Lucas
- Best Newcomer – Actor : Michael J. Jackson
- Best Newcomer – Actress : Lea Brodie

=== 1979 Winners ===
- Best Actor : Peter Ustinov – Death on the Nile
- Best Actress : Maggie Smith – California Suite
- Best Comedy : Porridge – Dick Clement
- Best Film : Death on the Nile – John Guillermin
- Best Newcomer – Actor : Simon MacCorkindale
- Best Newcomer – Actress : Karen Dotrice

=== 1980 Winners ===
- Best Actor : Denholm Elliott – Bad Timing, Rising Damp, Zulu Dawn
- Best Actress : Frances de la Tour – Rising Damp
- Best Comedy : Rising Damp – Joseph McGrath
- Best Film : Yanks – John Schlesinger
- Best Newcomer – Actor : Jonathan Pryce
- Best Newcomer – Actress : Wendy Morgan
- Peter Sellers Award for Comedy : Leonard Rossiter

== 1981–1990 Winners ==
=== 1981 Winners ===
- Best Actor : Bob Hoskins – The Long Good Friday
- Best Actress : Maggie Smith – Quartet
- Best Film : The French Lieutenant's Woman – Karel Reisz
- Best Screenplay : Colin Welland – Chariots of Fire
- Most Promising Filmmaker : Franco Rosso
- Peter Sellers Award for Comedy : Bill Forsyth

=== 1982 Winners ===
- Best Actor : Trevor Howard – Light Years Away
- Best Actress : Jennifer Kendal – 36 Chowringhee Lane
- Best Film : Moonlighting – Jerzy Skolimowski
- Best Screenplay : John Krish – Friend or Foe
- Most Promising Newcomer : Cassie McFarlane
- Peter Sellers Award for Comedy : Michael Blakemore

=== 1983 Winners ===
- Best Actor : Ben Kingsley – Gandhi, Betrayal
- Best Actress : Phyllis Logan – Another Time, Another Place
- Best Film : The Ploughman's Lunch – Richard Eyre
- Best Screenplay : Ian McEwan – The Ploughman's Lunch
- Best Technical or Artistic Achievement : Chris Menges
- Most Promising Newcomer : Neil Jordan
- Peter Sellers Award for Comedy : Bill Forsyth
- Special Award : Richard Attenborough

=== 1984 Winners ===
- Best Actor : John Hurt – 1984, Champions, The Hit
- Best Actress : Helen Mirren – Cal
- Best Film : 1984 – Michael Radford
- Best Screenplay : Bernard MacLaverty – Cal
- Best Technical or Artistic Achievement : John Alcott
- Most Promising Newcomer : Tim Roth
- Peter Sellers Award for Comedy : Denholm Elliott

=== 1985 Winners ===
- Best Actor : Victor Banerjee – A Passage to India
- Best Actress : Miranda Richardson – Dance with a Stranger
- Best Film : My Beautiful Laundrette – Stephen Frears
- Best Screenplay : Malcolm Mowbray, Alan Bennett – A Private Function
- Best Technical or Artistic Achievement : Norman Garwood
- Most Promising Newcomer : Margi Clarke, Alexandra Pigg
- Peter Sellers Award for Comedy : Michael Palin
- Special Award : George Harrison, Denis O'Brien

=== 1986 Winners ===
- Best Actor : Ray McAnally – The Mission, No Surrender
- Best Actress : Coral Browne – Dreamchild
- Best Film : A Room with a View
- Best Screenplay : Robert Bolt – The Mission
- Best Technical or Artistic Achievement : Tony Pierce-Roberts – A Room with a View
- Most Promising Newcomer : Gary Oldman – Sid and Nancy
- Peter Sellers Award for Comedy : Clockwise – John Cleese
- Special Award : Jake Eberts

=== 1987 Winners ===
- Best Actor : Derek Jacobi – Little Dorrit
- Best Actress : Emily Lloyd – Wish You Were Here
- Best Film : Hope and Glory – John Boorman
- Best Screenplay : Alan Bennett – Prick Up Your Ears
- Best Technical or Artistic Achievement : Anthony Pratt – Hope and Glory
- Most Promising Newcomer : Harry Hook – The Kitchen Toto
- Peter Sellers Award for Comedy : Personal Services, Wish You Were Here – David Leland

=== 1988 Winners ===
- Best Actor : Bob Hoskins – Who Framed Roger Rabbit, The Lonely Passion of Judith Hearne
- Best Actress : Billie Whitelaw – The Dressmaker and Maggie Smith – The Lonely Passion of Judith Hearne
- Best Film : A Fish Called Wanda
- Best Screenplay : Bruce Robinson – Withnail and I
- Best Technical or Artistic Achievement : William Diver, Patrick Duval – Distant Voices, Still Lives
- Most Promising Newcomer : Kristin Scott Thomas – A Handful of Dust and Jodhi May – A World Apart
- Peter Sellers Award for Comedy : A Fish Called Wanda – Charles Crichton
- Special Award : Richard Williams for Who Framed Roger Rabbit

=== 1989 Winners ===
- Best Actor : Daniel Day-Lewis – My Left Foot
- Best Actress : Pauline Collins – Shirley Valentine
- Best Film : Henry V – Kenneth Branagh
- Best Screenplay : Willy Russell – Shirley Valentine
- Best Technical or Artistic Achievement : Anton Furst – Batman
- Most Promising Newcomer : Andi Engel– Melancholia
- Peter Sellers Award for Comedy : High Hopes – Mike Leigh
- Special Award : Peter Greenaway

=== 1990 Winners ===
- Best Actor : Iain Glen – Mountains of the Moon, Fools of Fortune, Silent Scream
- Best Actress : Natasha Richardson – The Comfort of Strangers, The Handmaid's Tale
- Best Film : The Krays – Peter Medak
- Best Screenplay : Michael Eaton – Fellow Traveller
- Best Technical or Artistic Achievement : David Watkin – Memphis Belle
- Most Promising Newcomer : Philip Ridley – The Krays
- Peter Sellers Award for Comedy : Robbie Coltrane

== 1991–2000 Winners ==
=== 1991 Winners ===
- Best Actor : Alan Rickman – Robin Hood: Prince of Thieves, Close My Eyes, Truly Madly Deeply
- Best Actress : Juliet Stevenson – Truly, Madly, Deeply
- Best Film : Close My Eyes – Stephen Poliakoff
- Best Screenplay : Neil Jordan – The Miracle
- Best Technical or Artistic Achievement : Sandy Powell – Edward II, The Miracle, The Pope Must Die
- Most Promising Newcomer : Anthony Minghella – Truly, Madly, Deeply
- Peter Sellers Award for Comedy : The Commitments – Dick Clement, Roddy Doyle, Ian La Frenais

=== 1992 Winners ===
- Best Actor : Daniel Day-Lewis – The Last of the Mohicans
- Best Actress : Emma Thompson – Howards End, Peter's Friends
- Best Film : Howards End – James Ivory
- Best Screenplay : Terence Davies – The Long Day Closes
- Best Technical or Artistic Achievement : Sue Gibson – Hear My Song, Secret Friends
- Most Promising Newcomer : Peter Chelsom – Hear My Song
- Peter Sellers Award for Comedy : Peter's Friends

=== 1993 Winners ===
- Best Actor : David Thewlis – Naked
- Best Actress : Emma Thompson – The Remains of the Day, Much Ado About Nothing
- Best Film : Raining Stones – Ken Loach
- Best Screenplay : Jim Allen – Raining Stones
- Best Technical or Artistic Achievement : Sandy Powell – Orlando, Stuart Craig – The Secret Garden
- Most Promising Newcomer : Vadim Jean, Gary Sinyor – Leon the Pig Farmer
- Peter Sellers Award for Comedy : Les Blair – Bad Behaviour
- Special Award : Anthony Hopkins

=== 1994 Winners ===
- Best Actor : Ben Kingsley – Schindler's List
- Best Actress : Kristin Scott Thomas – Four Weddings and a Funeral
- Best Film : In the Name of the Father – Jim Sheridan
- Best Screenplay : Richard Curtis – Four Weddings and a Funeral
- Best Technical or Artistic Achievement : Dave Borthwick, Richard 'Hutch' Hutchinson – The Secret Adventures of Tom Thumb
- Most Promising Newcomer : Ian Hart – Backbeat, Gurinder Chadha – Bhaji on the Beach
- Peter Sellers Award for Comedy : Hugh Grant – Four Weddings and a Funeral
- Special Award : Alec Guinness

=== 1995 Winners ===
- Best Actor : Jonathan Pryce – Carrington
- Best Actress : Kristin Scott Thomas – Angels & Insects
- Best Film : The Madness of King George – Nicholas Hytner
- Best Screenplay : Alan Bennett – The Madness of King George
- Best Technical or Artistic Achievement : Andrew Dunn – The Madness of King George
- Most Promising Newcomer : Danny Boyle – Shallow Grave
- Peter Sellers Award for Comedy : Peter Chelsom – Funny Bones
- Special Award : Lewis Gilbert

=== 1996 Winners ===
- Best Actor : Liam Neeson – Michael Collins
- Best Actress : Kate Winslet – Sense and Sensibility, Jude
- Best Film : Richard III – Ian McKellen
- Best Screenplay : Emma Thompson – Sense and Sensibility, John Hodge – Trainspotting
- Best Technical or Artistic Achievement : Tony Burrough – Richard III
- Most Promising Newcomer : Emily Watson – Breaking the Waves
- Peter Sellers Award for Comedy : Mark Herman – Brassed Off
- Special Award : Leslie Phillips

=== 1997 Winners ===
- Best Actor : Robert Carlyle – The Full Monty, Carla's Song, Face
- Best Actress : Katrin Cartlidge – Career Girls
- Best Film : The Full Monty – Peter Cattaneo
- Best Screenplay : Jeremy Brock – Mrs Brown
- Best Technical or Artistic Achievement : Maria Djurkovic – Wilde
- Most Promising Newcomer : Jude Law – Wilde
- Peter Sellers Award for Comedy : Antony Sher – Mrs Brown
- Special Award : Ray Boulting, Kenneth Branagh – Hamlet

=== 1998 Winners ===
- Best Actor : Derek Jacobi – Love Is the Devil
- Best Actress : Julie Christie – Afterglow
- Best Film : The General – John Boorman
- Best Screenplay : Eileen Atkins – Mrs Dalloway
- Best Technical or Artistic Achievement : Ashley Rowe – The Woodlanders, The Governess, Still Crazy, Twenty Four Seven
- Most Promising Newcomer : Guy Ritchie – Lock, Stock and Two Smoking Barrels
- Peter Sellers Award for Comedy : Bill Nighy – Still Crazy
- Special Award : Ken Loach, Michael Caine

=== 1999 Winners ===
- Best Actor : Jeremy Northam – An Ideal Husband, The Winslow Boy
- Best Actress : Samantha Morton – Dreaming of Joseph Lees
- Best Film : East Is East – Damien O'Donnell
- Best Screenplay : Tom Stoppard – Shakespeare in Love
- Best Technical or Artistic Achievement : John de Borman – Hideous Kinky
- Most Promising Newcomer : Peter Mullan – Orphans
- Peter Sellers Award for Comedy : Hugh Grant – Notting Hill
- Special Award : Freddie Francis

=== 2000 Winners ===
- Best Actor : Jim Broadbent – Topsy-Turvy
- Best Actress : Julie Walters – Billy Elliot
- Best Film : Topsy-Turvy – Mike Leigh
- Best Screenplay : Neil Jordan – The End of the Affair
- Best Technical or Artistic Achievement : Andrew Sanders – The Golden Bowl
- Most Promising Newcomer : Jamie Bell – Billy Elliot
- Peter Sellers Award for Comedy : Peter Lord, Nick Park – Chicken Run
- Special Award : Peter Yates

== 2001–2010 Winners ==
=== 2001 Winners ===
- Best Film : Gosford Park
- Best Actor : Linus Roache – Pandaemonium
- Best Actress : Kate Winslet – Quills, Enigma, Iris
- Best Screenplay : Richard Curtis, Andrew Davies, Helen Fielding – Bridget Jones's Diary
- Most Promising Newcomer : Ben Hopkins – The Nine Lives of Tomas Katz
- Peter Sellers Award for Comedy : Hugh Grant – Bridget Jones's Diary
- Technical Achievement Award : Stuart Craig – Harry Potter and the Philosopher's Stone
- Special Award : Christopher Lee

=== 2002 Winners ===
- Best Film : Dirty Pretty Things
- Best Actor : Chiwetel Ejiofor – Dirty Pretty Things
- Best Actress : Catherine Zeta-Jones – Chicago
- Best Screenplay : Neil Hunter, Tom Hunsinger – Lawless Heart
- Most Promising Newcomer : Asif Kapadia – The Warrior
- Peter Sellers Award for Comedy : Keith Fulton, Louis Pepe, Lucy Darwin – Lost in La Mancha
- Technical Achievement Award : Eve Stewart – production designer, All or Nothing
- Special Award : Michael G. Wilson, Barbara Broccoli – 40 years of James Bond

=== 2003 Winners ===
- Best Film : Touching the Void
- Best Actor : Paul Bettany – Master and Commander: The Far Side of the World, The Heart of Me
- Best Actress : Emma Thompson – Love Actually
- Best Screenplay : Gregor Jordan, Nora Maccoby, Eric Weiss – Buffalo Soldiers
- Most Promising Newcomer : Max Pirkis – Master and Commander: The Far Side of the World
- Peter Sellers Award for Comedy : Bill Nighy – Love Actually
- Technical Achievement Award : Seamus McGarvey – The Hours
- Alexander Walker Special Award : Michael Winterbottom

=== 2004 Winners ===
- Best Film : Vera Drake
- Best Actor : Paddy Considine – Dead Man's Shoes
- Best Actress : Imelda Staunton – Vera Drake
- Best Screenplay : Paweł Pawlikowski – My Summer of Love
- Most Promising Newcomer : Emily Blunt, Natalie Press – My Summer of Love
- Peter Sellers Award for Comedy : Simon Pegg – Shaun of the Dead
- Technical Achievement Award : Roger Deakins – The Village, The Ladykillers
- Alexander Walker Special Award : Working Title Films

=== 2005 Winners ===
- Best Film : The Constant Gardener
- Best Actor : Ralph Fiennes – The Constant Gardener
- Best Actress : Natasha Richardson – Asylum
- Best Screenplay : Mark O'Halloran – Adam & Paul
- Most Promising Newcomer : Saul Dibb – Bullet Boy
- Technical Achievement Award : Neil Marshall – The Descent
- Peter Sellers Award for Comedy : Tom Hollander – Pride & Prejudice
- Alexander Walker Special Award : Nick Park

=== 2006 Winners ===
- Best Film : United 93
- Best Actor : Daniel Craig – Casino Royale
- Best Actress : Judi Dench – Notes on a Scandal
- Best Screenplay : Peter Morgan – The Queen, The Last King of Scotland
- Most Promising Newcomer : Paul Andrew Williams – London to Brighton
- Technical Achievement Award : Anthony Dod Mantle – Brothers of the Head, The Last King of Scotland
- Peter Sellers Award for Comedy : Sacha Baron Cohen – Borat
- Alexander Walker Special Award : Stephen Frears

=== 2007 Winners ===
- Best Film : Control
- Best Film Score : There Will Be Blood – Jonny Greenwood
- Best Actor : Daniel Day-Lewis – There Will Be Blood
- Best Actress : Helena Bonham Carter – Sweeney Todd: The Demon Barber of Fleet Street, Conversations with Other Women
- Best Screenplay : Matt Greenhalgh – Control
- Most Promising Newcomer : John Carney – Once
- Technical Achievement Award : Seamus McGarvey (cinematographer), Sarah Greenwood (production designer), Jacqueline Durran (costume designer) – Atonement
- Alexander Walker Special Award : Julie Christie

=== 2008 Winners ===
- Best Film : Hunger
- Best Director : Stephen Daldry – The Reader
- Best Actor : Michael Sheen – Frost/Nixon, Pat Shortt – Garage
- Best Actress : Tilda Swinton – Julia
- Best Screenplay : Martin McDonagh – In Bruges
- Most Promising Newcomer : Joanna Hogg – Unrelated
- Technical Achievement Award : Mark Digby – Slumdog Millionaire
- Peter Sellers Award for Comedy : Sally Hawkins – Happy-Go-Lucky
- Alexander Walker Special Award : Mike Leigh

=== 2009 Winners ===
- Best Film : Fish Tank
- Best Actor : Andy Serkis – Sex & Drugs & Rock & Roll
- Best Actress : Anne-Marie Duff – Nowhere Boy
- Best Screenplay : Jesse Armstrong, Simon Blackwell, Armando Iannucci, Tony Roche – In The Loop
- Most Promising Newcomer : Peter Strickland – Katalin Varga
- Best Documentary : Anvil! The Story of Anvil
- Technical Achievement Award : Barry Ackroyd (cinematographer) – The Hurt Locker
- Peter Sellers Award for Comedy : Sacha Baron Cohen – Brüno
- Alexander Walker Special Award : Nicolas Roeg

=== 2010 Winners ===
- Best Film : Neds
- Best Actor : Andrew Garfield – The Social Network, Never Let Me Go
- Best Actress : Kristin Scott Thomas – Leaving
- Best Screenplay : Clio Barnard – The Arbor
- Most Promising Newcomer : Ben Wheatley (Director/Co-Producer) – Down Terrace
- Best Documentary : John Krish – A Day in the Life: Four Portraits of Post-War Britain
- Technical Achievement Award : Gareth Edwards (cinematography, production design, visual effects) – Monsters
- Peter Sellers Award for Comedy : Roger Allam – Tamara Drewe
- Alexander Walker Special Award : Christopher Nolan for his contribution to film

== 2011–2020 Winners ==
=== 2011 Winners ===
- Best Film : We Need to Talk About Kevin
- Best Actor : Michael Fassbender – Shame, Jane Eyre
- Best Actress : Olivia Colman – Tyrannosaur
- Best Screenplay : Andrew Haigh – Weekend
- Most Promising Newcomer : Tom Kingsley, Will Sharpe (Co-writers/Directors) – Black Pond
- Best Documentary : Senna
- Technical Achievement Award : Robbie Ryan for his cinematography on Wuthering Heights
- Peter Sellers Award for Comedy : The Guard
- Alexander Walker Special Award : John Hurt for his contribution to cinema

=== 2012 Winners ===
- Best Film : Skyfall
- Best Actor : Toby Jones – Berberian Sound Studio
- Best Actress : Andrea Riseborough – Shadow Dancer
- Best Screenplay : Malcolm Campbell – What Richard Did
- Most Promising Newcomer : Sally El Hosaini (Writer/Director) – My Brother the Devil
- Best Documentary : The Imposter
- Technical Achievement Award : Sarah Greenwood, Jacqueline Durran, and Seamus McGarvey, for their production design, costume design, and cinematography on Anna Karenina
- Peter Sellers Award for Comedy : Sightseers

=== 2015 Winners ===
- Best Film : Brooklyn
- Best Actor : Idris Elba – Beasts of No Nation
- Best Actress : Maggie Smith – The Lady in the Van
- Best Documentary : Amy
- Blockbuster of the Year : Star Wars: The Force Awakens
- Editor's Award : 45 Years
- Best Screenplay : Emma Donoghue – Room
- Rising Star : Maisie Williams – The Falling
- Comedy Award : Emma Thompson – The Legend of Barney Thomson
- Technical Achievement : Mark Digby – production designer on Ex Machina
- Outstanding Contribution : Alan Bennett

=== 2016 Winners ===
- Best Film : I, Daniel Blake
- Best Actor : Hugh Grant – Florence Foster Jenkins
- Best Actress : Kate Beckinsale – Love & Friendship
- Best Supporting Actor : Arinze Kene – The Pass
- Best Supporting Actress : Hayley Squires – I, Daniel Blake
- Best Documentary : Before the Flood
- Best Screenplay : Guy Hibbert – Eye in the Sky
- Comedy Award : Bridget Jones's Baby
- Breakthrough of the Year : Florence Pugh – Lady Macbeth
- Technical Achievement : Max Richter – contribution of his music on Arrival
- Most Powerful Scene : I, Daniel Blake
- International Film of the Year : Lion
- Editor's Award : Fantastic Beasts and Where to Find Them

=== 2017 Winners ===
- Best Film : God's Own Country
- Best Actor : Daniel Kaluuya – Get Out
- Best Actress : Kristin Scott Thomas – The Party
- Best Supporting Actor : Simon Russell Beale – The Death of Stalin
- Best Supporting Actress : Gemma Jones – God's Own Country
- Best Screenplay : Sally Potter – The Party
- Comedy Award : Paddington 2
- Breakthrough of the Year : Rungano Nyoni – I Am Not a Witch
- Technical Achievement : Gary Williamson – contribution of his production design on Paddington 2
