= Semantics (disambiguation) =

Semantics is the linguistic and philosophical study of meaning in language.

Semantics may also refer to:

- Semantics (computer science), the mathematical study of the meaning of programming languages
- Semantics of logic, the study of the interpretations of formal and natural languages
- Semantics (psychology), the study of meaning within psychology

== Books ==
- Semantics (Lyons book), book by Sir John Lyons
- Semantics (Saeed book), book by John I. Saeed
- Semantics: the Study of Meaning, book by Geoffrey Leech

== Other ==
- Semantics (album), album by Australian Crawl
