= Lutz Marten =

German linguist and africanist

Lutz Marten (born 1967) is a German linguist and Africanist. He is currently professor of general and African linguistics at SOAS University of London. Between 2020 and 2024, he was the editor of the Transactions of the Philological Society. As of June 2024, he serves as the president of the Philological Society.

== Academic career ==
After studying English language and literature, philosophy and African studies at the University of Hamburg, Marten joined SOAS for a Masters programme in linguistics in 1993, where, in 1995, he subsequently began his doctoral studies under the supervision of Ruth Kempson. In 1999, he completed his thesis entitled Syntactic and Semantic Underspecification in the Verb Phrase.

== Research ==
Between 2014 and 2018, Marten was the principal investigator of the research project Morphosyntactic variation in Bantu: Typology, contact and change, which was funded by the Leverhulme Trust. He is also involved in the development of the Dynamic Syntax framework project, which is supported by grants from the ESRC, EPSRC, the Leverhulme Trust and AHRC.

== Selected publications ==
- McGrath, Donovan; Marten, Lutz (2012). Colloquial Swahili: The Complete Course for Beginners. London/New York: Routledge.
- Marten, Lutz; Cann, R.; Kempson, Ruth (2005). The Dynamics of Language. An Introduction. Amsterdam: Elsevier Academic Press.
- Marten, Lutz (2002). At the Syntax-Pragmatics Interface. Verbal Underspecification and Concept Formation in Dynamic Syntax. Oxford: Oxford University Press.
- Marten, Lutz, Nancy C. Kula & N. Thwala. 2007. Parameters of morphosyntactic variation in Bantu. Transactions of the Philological Society 105: 253–338. doi.org/10.1111/j.1467-968X.2007.00190.x
- Möhlig, Wilhelm; Marten, Lutz (2002). A Grammatical Sketch of Herero (Otjiherero). Cologne: Köppe.
