= Transactions of the Philological Society =

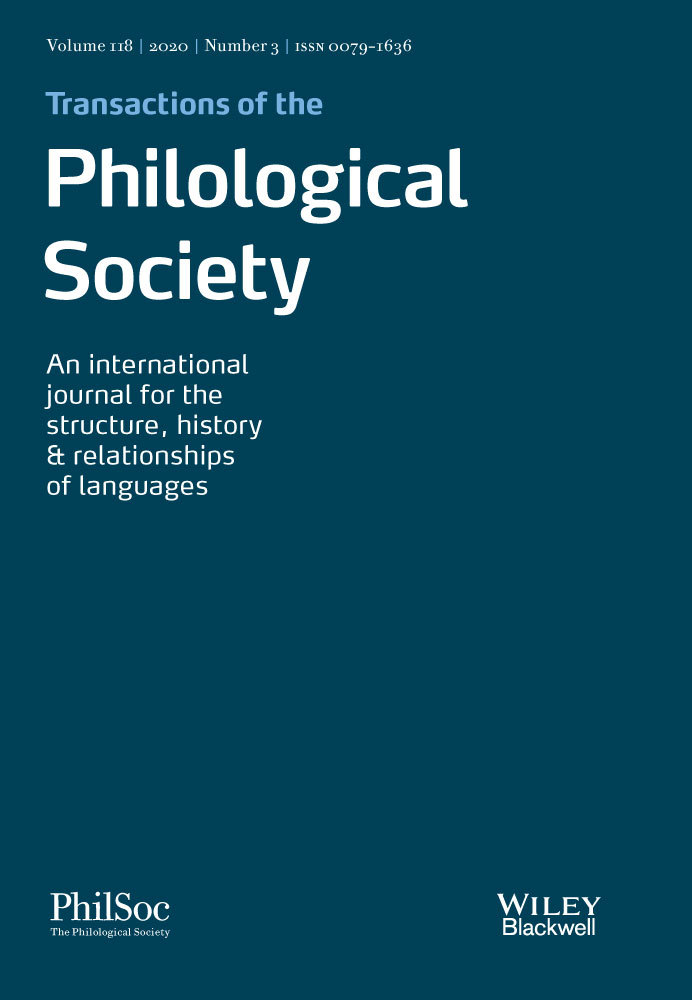
- Discipline: Linguistics
- Language: English
- Edited by: Lutz Marten

Publication details
- Former name: Proceedings of the Philological Society
- History: 1854–present
- Publisher: Wiley-Blackwell
- Frequency: Triannually

Standard abbreviations
- ISO 4: Trans. Philol. Soc.

Indexing
- ISSN: 0079-1636 (print); 1467-968X (web)
- LCCN: 12022413
- OCLC no.: 795975210

Links
- Journal homepage

Transactions of the Philological Society is a linguistics journal published three times a year by Wiley-Blackwell on behalf of the Philological Society. It has appeared since 1854, making it the oldest scholarly linguistics journal. It is currently edited by Delia Bentley (The University of Manchester); Frans Plank and Nigel Vincent act as consulting editors.

Next to the journal itself, an associated series of monographs is published, which is edited by Melanie Green.

== Indexing and Abstracting ==
The Transactions are abstracted and indexed, among others, in the following indices and bibliographies:

- Academic Search
- Arts and Humanities Citation Index
- MLA International Bibliography
- Periodicals Index Online
- Web of Science

== Monograph Series Publications of the Philological Society ==
As of 1 November 2022, the most recent titles published in this series are:

- Blaxter, Tamsin T. S. (2021). Diachronic Dialectology: New Methods and Case Studies in Medieval Norwegian. Chichester: Wiley-Blackwell. doi:10.1111/1467-968X.12228. ISBN 9781119858973. (PPhS vol. 53)
- Cser, András (2020). The Phonology of Classical Latin. Chichester: Wiley-Blackwell. doi:10.1111/1467-968X.12184. ISBN 9781119700609. (PPhS vol. 52)
- Nurmio, Silvia (2020). Grammatical number in Welsh: diachrony and typology. Chichester: Wiley-Blackwell. doi:10.1111/1467-968X.12157. ISBN 9781119615262. (PPhS vol. 51)
- Dance, Richard (2019). Words derived from Old Norse in Sir Gawain and the Green Knight: An etymological survey. London: Wiley-Blackwell. doi:10.1111/1467-968X.12148_01. ISBN 9781119580027. (PPhS vol. 50)
- Gibson, Hannah (2018). Building meaning in context: A dynamic approach to Bantu clause structure. London: Wiley-Blackwell. doi:10.1111/1467-968X.12136. ISBN 9781119532255. (PPhS vol. 49)
- Costa, James (2017). Revitalising Language in Provence: A Critical Approach. London: Wiley-Blackwell. doi:10.1111/1467-968X.12088. ISBN 9781119243533. (PPhS vol. 48)
- Crellin, Robert Samuel David (2016). The Syntax and Semantics of the Perfect Active in Literary Koine Greek. London: Wiley-Blackwell. doi:10.1111/1467-968X.12080. ISBN 9781119243540. (PPhS vol. 47)
- Leonard, Stephen Pax (2012). Language, Society and Identity in early Iceland. London: Wiley-Blackwell. doi:10.1558/sols.v8i2.315. ISBN 9781118294963.
