= Sophia Di Martino =

English actress (born 1983)

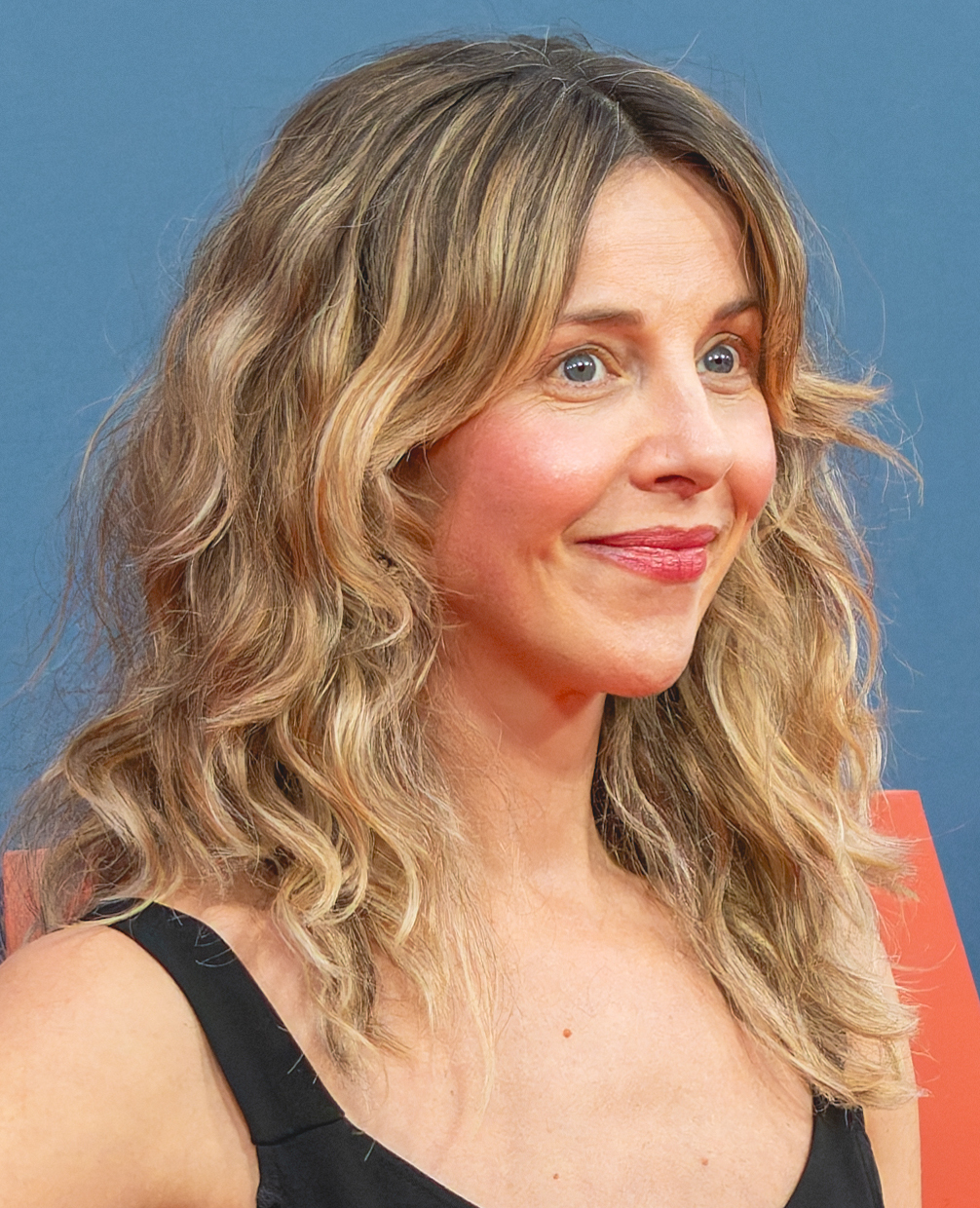
- Di Martino in 2024
- Born: 15 November 1983 (age 42); Nottingham, England
- Education: University of Salford (BA)
- Occupation: Actress
- Years active: 2004–present
- Spouse: Will Sharpe
- Children: 2

Sophia Di Martino (born 15 November 1983) is an English actress known for portraying Sylvie in the Marvel Cinematic Universe television series Loki (2021–2023), which earned her two MTV Movie & TV Awards and a nomination for a Critics' Choice Television Award for Best Supporting Actress in a Drama Series. She has also had starring roles in the television shows Casualty (2009–2011) and Flowers (2016–2018).

== Early life and education ==
Di Martino was born in Nottingham and grew up in the suburb of Attenborough. She is half Italian. She attended Chilwell Comprehensive School, where she completed an A Level in performing arts. She went on to graduate with a Bachelor of Arts with honours in media and performance from the University of Salford.

== Career ==
Di Martino works in television, film, theatre, and music. In Channel 4's Flowers, she plays Amy Flowers. She plays Eva in the 2016 feature film The Darkest Universe. She appeared as Amber in the third series of Sky's Mount Pleasant and as Emma, the girlfriend of Simon Bird's character Adam, in the first episode of series three of Channel 4's Friday Night Dinner. She also appeared in the third series of 4 O'Clock Club in 2014 as Miss Parkwood and in the 2015 film Royal Day Out.

She was a regular cast member of Casualty, playing the role of Pauline "Polly" Emmerson from 19 March 2009 until 30 April 2011. In 2018, she appeared in Click & Collect.

In 2019, she was cast as Sylvie in the Disney+ show Loki. Season one premiered on 9 June 2021 and concluded on 14 July. Di Martino won Best Breakthrough Performance and Best Team with Tom Hiddleston and Owen Wilson at the 2022 MTV Movie & TV Awards. Season two of Loki premiered on 5 October 2023.

Di Martino also co-hosts the True Spies podcast.

== Personal life ==
In 2016, Di Martino stated that she has "had relationships with both men and women", that she believes "sexuality is a fluid thing", and that she has "definitely tried on different labels at different points in my life". She is married to actor and writer Will Sharpe, with whom she has been in a relationship since 2009. They have two children, born in 2019 and 2021.

== Selected filmography ==
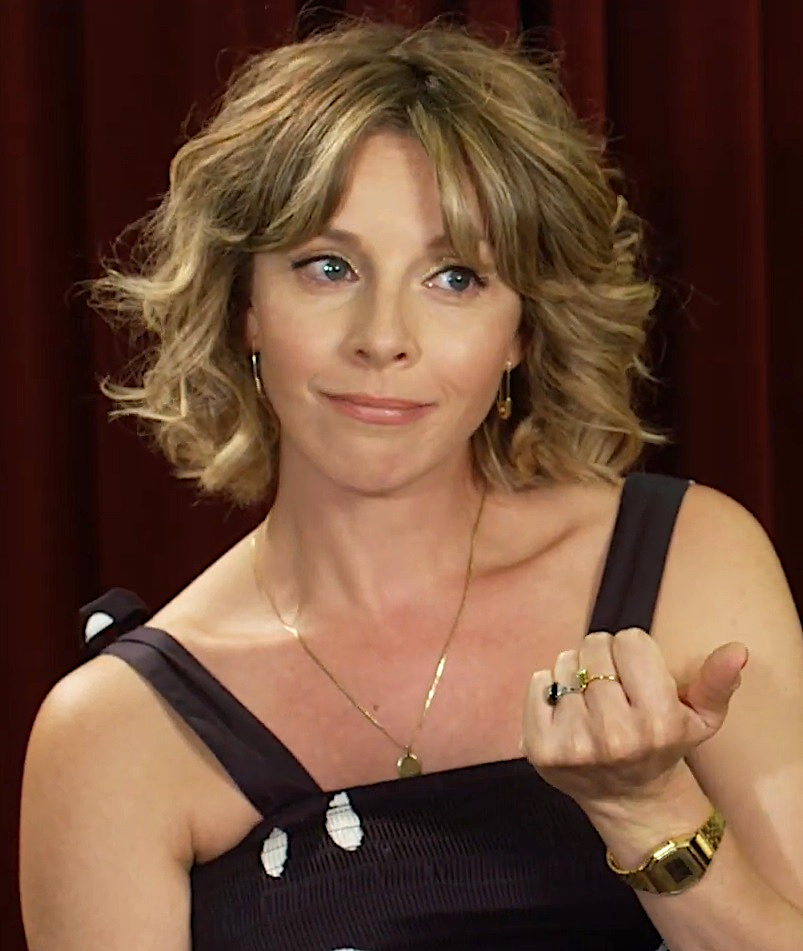
Sophia di Martino interviewed by BIFA about Sweetheart in 2021

=== Film ===
Key
†	Denotes films that have not yet been released

List of film appearances, with year, title and role shown
Year	Title	Role	Notes
2011	Black Pond	Rachel	
2015	A Royal Night Out	Phoebe	
2016	The Darkest Universe	Eva	
2018	Click & Collect	Claire	
2019	Yesterday	Carol	
2021	Sweetheart	Lucy	
2021	The Electrical Life of Louis Wain	Judith	
2024	Witches		Documentary
2024	The Radleys	Lorna	
2026	Merry Christmas Aubrey Flint	Ellen	
TBA	Blueberry Inn †	TBA	Post-production

=== Television ===
Key
†	Denotes television productions that have not yet been released

List of television appearances, with year, title and role shown
Year	Title	Role	Notes
2004	Holby City	Gemma Walker	1 episode
2005	Doctors	Natalie James	1 episode
2006	New Street Law	Ella	1 episode
2006	Strictly Confidential	Roanna	1 episode
2007–2009	Ideal	Helena	2 episodes
2007	Heartbeat	Wendy	1 episode
2007	The Marchioness Disaster	Erika Spotswood	TV movie
2008	The Royal Today	Gemma Pennant	Main cast
2008	Spooks: Code 9	Harpie Girlfriend	1 episode
2008	Survivors	Simone	1 episode
2009	Boy Meets Girl	Fashion Student	1 episode
2009–2011	Casualty	Polly Emmerson / Shauna Milsom	Main cast; 83 episodes
2010	The Road to Coronation Street	Josie Scott	TV movie
2012	Eternal Law	Lucy Orchard	1 episode
2013	Great Night Out	Mabel	1 episode
2013	Southcliffe	Micki	1 episode
2013	Mount Pleasant	Amber	8 episodes
2014	Friday Night Dinner	Emma	1 episode
2014	4 O'Clock Club	Miss Emma Parkwood	10 episodes
2015	Hetty Feather	Hannah Prestwick	1 episode
2015	The Job Lot	Jodie	1 episode
2016	Midsomer Murders	Amber Layard	1 episode
2016–2018	Flowers	Amy Flowers	Main cast
2017	Hidden America with Jonah Ray	Emma	1 episode
2018	Into the Badlands	Lily	2 episodes
2018	Click & Collect	Claire	TV movie
2020	Silent Witness	DCI Claire Ashby	2 episodes
2021–2023	Loki	Sylvie	Main cast
2022–2024	Peacock	Blue	6 episodes
2025	Too Much	Silvia Violet	1 episode
2027	Prodigies †	Heidi	Main cast

== Awards and nominations ==
Year	Work	Award	Category	Result	Ref.
2019	The Lost Films of Bloody Nora	Berlin Independent Film Festival	Best UK Short Film	Won	
2022	Loki	Critics' Choice Super Awards	Best Actress in a Superhero Series	Nominated	
2022	Loki	MTV Movie & TV Awards	Best Breakthrough Performance	Won	
2022	Loki	MTV Movie & TV Awards	Best Team (with Tom Hiddleston and Owen Wilson)	Won	
2022	Loki	Hollywood Critics Association TV Awards	Best Supporting Actress in a Streaming Series, Drama	Nominated	
2024	Loki	Critics' Choice Television Awards	Best Supporting Actress in a Drama Series	Nominated	
2024	Loki	Critics' Choice Super Awards	Best Actress in a Superhero Series, Limited Series or Made-for-TV Movie	Nominated	
