= Philological Society =

Learned society for the study and promotion of languages, linguistics, and philology

The Philological Society
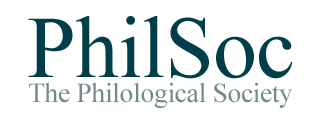
- Nickname: PhilSoc
- Formation: 1842; 184 years ago
- Founder: Edwin Guest
- Type: learned society
- Registration no.: 1014370
- Legal status: charity, limited company
- Headquarters: London, England
- Fields: Linguistics
- Members: 641 (2019)
- President: Lutz Marten
- Publication: Transactions of the Philological Society Publications of the Philological Society
- Website: www.philsoc.org.uk

The Philological Society, or London Philological Society, is the oldest learned society in Great Britain dedicated to the study of language as well as a registered charity. The current Society was established in 1842 to "investigate and promote the study and knowledge of the structure, the affinities, and the history of languages". The society publishes a journal, the Transactions of the Philological Society, issued three times a year as well as a monographic series.

The first Philological Society, based in London's Fitzroy Square, was founded in 1792 under the patronage of Thomas Collingwood of St Edmund Hall, Oxford. Its publication was titled The European Magazine, and London Review.

The Philological Society is a member organisation of the University Council of General and Applied Linguistics.

== History ==
The Society's early history is most marked by a proposal in July 1857 to create an up-to-date dictionary of the English language. This proposal, issued by Richard Chenevix Trench, Herbert Coleridge, and Frederick Furnivall, members of the Unregistered Words Committee, and an article by Trench, entitled On Some Deficiencies in our English Dictionaries, eventually led the Society to formally adopt the idea of creating a comprehensive new dictionary on 7 January 1858. Coleridge, and later Furnivall, led the project by compiling quotations, submitted by volunteer readers, illustrating the usage of words. In 1879, Oxford University Press agreed to publish the dictionary which would become known as the Oxford English Dictionary, with Society member James Murray being appointed editor that year.

In 1952, the Society hosted the seventh Congress of the International Congress of Linguists in London.

At a later date, the Society was instrumental in the early stages of the Survey of English Dialects conducted by Harold Orton between 1950 and 1961, helping to develop, amongst other things, a questionnaire for use in gathering data.

== Activities ==
The society holds seven regular meetings each academic year; traditionally, four take place in London at SOAS University of London, the other three in Cambridge, Oxford, and at another university outside of South East England. Most meetings consist of hour-long academic papers being presented by one or more scholar. Occasionally, round table or panel discussions are organised. Every two years, together with the British Academy the Society organises the Anna Morpurgo Davies Lecture, named in honour of its former president.

== Prizes and Bursaries ==
Once every two years, the Society awards the R. H. Robins Prize for an article on a subject within the Society's area of interest; the prize bears the name of a former president of the Society. Every year, the Society further awards a limited number of bursaries valued at up to £15,000 each to students embarking on taught postgraduate programmes in all areas of linguistics or philology.

== Governance ==
The Society is a registered charity and a company limited by guarantee, having been incorporated on 2 January 1879. The Society is governed by its trustees, consisting of the President (appointed at an Annual General Meeting for a period of three years, with the option to renew for one further year), the vice-presidents (appointed for life at an Annual General Meeting; usually former presidents), the other Officers, and up to twenty ordinary members of Council, who are elected annually at an Annual General Meeting.

As of June 2026, the Officers of the Society are:

- Secretary: Kersti Börjars
- Treasurer: Ranjan Sen
- Secretary for Publications (Transactions): Delia Bentley
- Secretary for Publications (Monographs): Tine Breban
- Secretary for Membership: Graham Pointon
- Secretary for Student Associate Members: Rebecca Hunt

== List of presidents ==
The following list is based on the sporadically occurring statements concerning membership of the Society's Council as printed in the Transactions of the Philological Society of the relevant years.

- 1842–1869: Connop Thirlwall
- 1869–1872: Theodor Goldstücker
- 1872–1874: Alexander John Ellis
- 1874–1875: Richard Morris
- 1875–1878: Henry Sweet
- 1878–1880: James Murray
- 1880–1882: Alexander John Ellis
- 1882–1884: James Murray
- 1884–1887: Walter William Skeat
- 1890–1893 : Henry Bradley
- 1896–1897: A. W. Verrall
- 1900–1903 : Henry Bradley
- 1909–1910 : Henry Bradley
- 1910–1915: W. A. Craigie
- 1915–1919: W. P. Ker
- 1919–1922: Israel Gollancz
- 1943–1944: W. A. Craigie
- 1944–1948: Charles Leslie Wrenn
- 1948–1952: Harold Bailey
- 1952–1954: N. B. Jopson
- 1954–1957: John Rupert Firth
- 1957–1960: Leonard Palmer
- 1976–1980: Anna Morpurgo Davies
- 1980–1984: Ilya Gershevitch
- 1984–1988: Eugénie Henderson
- 1988–1992: R. H. Robins
- 1992–1996: P. H. Matthews
- 1996–2000: Rebecca Posner
- 2000–2003: Nigel Vincent
- 2003–2007: Nicholas Sims-Williams
- 2007–2009: Keith Brown
- 2009–2013: Sylvia Adamson
- 2013–2017: Wendy Ayres-Bennett
- 2017–2020: Aditi Lahiri
- 2020–2024: Susan Fitzmaurice
- 2024–present: Lutz Marten

== See also ==
- Oxford English Dictionary
- Philology
- Linguistics
- Transactions of the Philological Society
- Survey of English Dialects
