= Caroline Heycock =

Scottish syntactician and professor

Caroline Heycock FBA FRSE is a Scottish syntactician and professor of linguistics at the University of Edinburgh.

Heycock received her PhD from the University of Pennsylvania in 1991, with a dissertation entitled Layers of predication: The non-lexical syntax of clauses.

Heycock is known for her work in theoretical syntax, with particular reference to English, Faroese and the other Germanic languages, and to Japanese. Topics on which she has conducted notable research include reconstruction phenomena, equatives and other copular constructions, particularly pseudoclefts, the syntax and semantics of (especially) nominal conjunction, and syntactic attrition in the native language of advanced learners of a second language. In 2019 she was a co-author of a work examining the possible position of contractions in Scots English, focusing on the use of a "locative discovery expressions" in which speakers can utter both "there it's there" and "there its".

She has been an editor-in-chief of the Journal of Linguistics, published by Cambridge University Press for the Linguistic Association of Great Britain and is currently on its editorial board. She is a member of the Scots Syntax Atlas Project Team.

== Recognition ==
In July 2019 Heycock was elected Fellow of the British Academy. She was elected to the Fellowship of the Royal Society of Edinburgh in 2022.

== Selected publications ==
- Caroline Heycock. 1995. "Asymmetries in reconstruction," Linguistic inquiry. 547–570.
- Caroline Heycock, Anthony Kroch. 1999. "Pseudocleft connectedness: Implications for the LF interface level," Linguistic inquiry. 30(3), 365–397.
- Ianthi Tsimpli, Antonella Sorace, Caroline Heycock, Francesca Filiaci. 2004. "First language attrition and syntactic subjects: A study of Greek and Italian near-native speakers of English," International Journal of Bilingualism 8 (3), 257–277.
- Caroline Heycock. 2006. "Embedded root phenomena," 2006.The Blackwell companion to syntax,
- Gary Thoms, David Adger, Caroline Heycock, Jennifer Smith. 2019. "Syntactic variation and auxiliary contraction: The surprising case of Scots," Language. 95 (3), 421–455.
