= Gregg Wallace: The British Miracle Meat =

2023 British satirical documentary

- Genre: Satire, documentary
- Based on: A Modest Proposal
- Written by: Matt Edmonds
- Directed by: Tom Kingsley
- Presented by: Gregg Wallace; Michelle Ackerley
- Starring: Claire Ashton; Stephen Chapman; Joan Hodges; Julianna Kurokawa; Michel Albert Roux
- Country of origin: United Kingdom
- Original language: English

Production
- Executive producer: Jack Kennedy
- Producer: Jonathan Levene
- Cinematography: Jakob Cizic
- Editor: Jon Dean
- Running time: 23 minutes

Original release
- Network: Channel 4
- Release: 24 July 2023

Gregg Wallace: The British Miracle Meat is a satirical documentary written by Matt Edmonds and presented by Gregg Wallace, and co-presented by Michelle Ackerley. It was first broadcast on 24 July 2023 on the British television channel, Channel 4. It depicts the development in food technology by which a British industry produces a large amount of genetically engineered human meat. It was later revealed as a mockumentary based on a satirical essay, A Modest Proposal, by Jonathan Swift in 1729 that urged poor Irish people to sell their children to the rich as food. The Guardian reported it as "one of the best hoaxes in media history", and as Barbara Ellen described, "[It was] a sociopolitical mockumentary, a straight-faced, grimly cannibalistic satire on the cost of living crisis."

== Summary ==
Channel 4 describes the theme of the film: "With food prices soaring, Gregg Wallace investigates a controversial new lab-grown meat product that its makers claim could provide a solution to the cost-of-living crisis." In a format similar to the series Inside the Factory (also presented by Wallace), the documentary features a tour of Good Harvest, a secret food industry in Lincolnshire that had succeeded in making cheap and fresh meat that will cut down the cost of living. The meats were made from human tissues in the form of cakes. The donors were paid "two weeks' worth of energy bills" for about a pound of flesh they gave, more specifically, £250 for a single buttock, double is £400. The CEO of the company, Tamara Ennett, explained the procedure of collecting the flesh as "pain-subjective".

The meat samples were grown in the laboratory, and genetically modified using the flesh cells to produce large pieces of meat. Wallace remarked: "under EU law, we couldn't possibly operate machines like this due to legislation. But now [after Brexit] we can harvest people and pay them for their flesh," and concludes the film: "So it's no surprise eating children seems a more likely path for our country."

Wallace then travels to London for a taste test at Le Gavroche with Michel Roux Jr. Trying out three different samples of meat, they agree that the best was the "premium", later revealed to be from children under age seven who had just played to relax their muscles, as Wallace explained: "Like livestock on the way to the abattoir, any stress could affect the quality of their meat."

== Revelation and reactions ==
It was later revealed that the documentary was a parody based on Jonathan Swift's satirical essay, A Modest Proposal, written in 1729. Swift had suggested that poor Irish people should sell their children to the rich as food. The essay was also shown in the credits. Wallace wrote in Instagram a day after the broadcast: "Thank you for watching. I really enjoyed my first acting job!" Good Harvest was a fake factory. The director, Tom Kingsley explained, "Our intention wasn't to create a hoax – it was just that we felt the satire would be more powerful if it caught people by surprise." It provoked alarmed reactions on social media, notably Twitter, by viewers that had taken the programme to be real. It received 400 complaints to Ofcom.

In a review in The Guardian, Lucy Mangan described it as "cleverly executed" and expressed her initial surprise, "It took a shamefully long time for me to work out what was going on... But for anyone even more gullible than I am, and especially if they have read their Swift, the next twist leaves no room for doubt about what is – quite unexpectedly on a weekday evening from mischievous Channel 4 and writer Matt Edmonds – actually happening." Susan Fitzmaurice in The Conversation commented, saying, "It succeeded in generating the heat because it tapped into the anger and passion that people feel about the current state of affairs. It was savage satire." Neil Armstrong of BBC Culture, compared the mockumentary to the 1992 horror mockumentary Ghostwatch, Chris Morris's Brass Eye satire series of the 1990s, and The Great Donor Show which shocked the Netherlands in 2007.

Anita Singh reviewed in The Telegraph with a critical comment, saying, "It would have worked far better as an advert for vegetarianism. Instead it played out like a Black Mirror episode stripped of cleverness and subtlety." Armstrong on BBC Culture also noted that "a couple of members of Parliament condemned it and some who watched insisted that, even as satire, it had been – forgive the pun – in poor taste." Michael Odell in the Evening Standard also criticised, remarking, "Just as I was about to ring family living up North [as Wallace's team would like to taste people from the region] and tell them to lock all doors or shoot Wallace on sight (to be honest, some are already prepared for the latter) the 'mockumentary’ lost its satirical power."
