= LAGB =

LAGB may refer to:

- Laparoscopic adjustable gastric band, a form of bariatric surgery
- Linguistics Association of Great Britain
- Low-angle grain boundary
