= Prodigies (TV series) =

Upcoming British series

- Genre: Romantic comedy
- Created by: Will Sharpe
- Written by: Will Sharpe
- Directed by: Will Sharpe
- Starring: Will Sharpe; Ayo Edebiri
- Country of origin: United Kingdom
- Original language: English

Production
- Executive producers: Will Sharpe; Ayo Edebiri; Jane Featherstone; Naomi de Pear; Katie Carpenter
- Production company: Sister

Original release
- Network: Apple TV

Prodigies is an upcoming British television series created by Will Sharpe for Apple TV. The series stars Sharpe and Ayo Edebiri. The series is due to be released on 10 February 2027.

== Premise ==
A couple in their thirties who are in a long-term relationship wonder if they have fulfilled their potential as former child prodigies.

== Cast ==
=== Main ===
- Ayo Edebiri as Didi
- Will Sharpe as Ren
- Sophia Di Martino as Heidi
- Andrene Ward-Hammond as Moira
- Yumi Asō as Kimiko
- Tobias Menzies as Sebastian Fernandez
- Reece Shearsmith as Marco
- Nabhaan Rizwan
- Meera Syal as Dahlia
- Lolly Adefope as Odessa
- Maria Bakalova as Aurelia
- Steven Waddington as Mick

=== Recurring ===
- Rina Sawayama as Hana, Ren's sister

=== Guest ===
- John Malkovich as Keith

== Production ==
The seven-part series is written and directed by Will Sharpe and is produced by the British company Sister. Sharpe also leads the cast alongside Ayo Edebiri, who is also an executive producer. Other executive producers include Jane Featherstone, Naomi de Pear, Katie Carpenter and Sharpe.

Rina Sawayama joined the cast in a recurring role in May 2025. In August 2025, Andrene Ward-Hammond, Yumi Asō and Tobias Menzies joined the cast alongside British comic actors Reece Shearsmith, Nabhaan Rizwan, Meera Syal and Lolly Adefope and John Malkovich in a guest role.

Filming began in July 2025.

== Release ==
The series is set to premiere on 10 February 2027 with two episodes, followed by one episode weekly until 17 March.
