= The Electrical Life of Louis Wain =

2021 UK film by Will Sharpe

- Promotional release poster
- Directed by: Will Sharpe
- Screenplay by: Simon Stephenson; Will Sharpe
- Story by: Simon Stephenson
- Produced by: Adam Ackland; Ed Clarke; Leah Clarke
- Starring: Benedict Cumberbatch; Claire Foy; Andrea Riseborough; Toby Jones
- Narrated by: Olivia Colman
- Cinematography: Erik Wilson
- Edited by: Selina Macarthur
- Music by: Arthur Sharpe
- Production companies: StudioCanal; Film4 Productions; Shoebox Films; SunnyMarch
- Distributed by: StudioCanal (United Kingdom and France) Amazon Studios (United States)
- Release dates: 2 September 2021 (Telluride); 5 November 2021 (United States); 1 January 2022 (United Kingdom)
- Running time: 111 minutes
- Countries: France; United Kingdom; United States
- Language: English

The Electrical Life of Louis Wain is a 2021 biographical comedy-drama film based on the true life story of Louis Wain. It was directed by Will Sharpe, from a story by Simon Stephenson, and screenplay by Stephenson and Sharpe. The film stars Benedict Cumberbatch (as the eccentric artist Louis Wain), Claire Foy, Andrea Riseborough and Toby Jones.

The Electrical Life of Louis Wain had its world premiere at the 48th Telluride Film Festival on 2 September 2021, had a limited release on 22 October 2021, and was released in the United States on Prime Video on 5 November 2021. It was released in the United Kingdom on 1 January 2022, by StudioCanal.

== Plot ==
In 1881, after his father's death, Louis Wain, the only male member and eldest of the Wain family, supports his five sisters and his mother as a part-time illustrator for The Illustrated London News under editor Sir William Ingram. Wain declines a full-time job to try composing music and playwriting; neither venture is successful.

Louis hires Emily Richardson as governess for his sisters and they are attracted to each other, to the dismay of eldest sister Caroline. Louis takes the full-time position to keep Emily as governess. He takes the family and Emily to the theatre to see The Tempest, during which he has a recurring nightmare of drowning. Emily comforts him in the men's toilets, causing a scandal when a neighbour gossips about the incident. Caroline fires Emily that night but before she can leave, Louis professes his love and they begin a courtship.

They marry in 1884, causing another scandal due to her being ten years his senior and of a lower class. Louis takes freelance artist work to continue supporting his mother and sisters. Emily is diagnosed with breast cancer. They take in a stray kitten - unusual for the time - which they name Peter. Louis' initially realistic paintings of Peter become more anthropomorphic as Emily's condition worsens.

Financial pressure causes Sir William to cut Louis' workload, and he advises Louis spend the time with Emily. She encourages Louis to show his cat pictures to Sir William, who prints them to acclaim in the Christmas edition. Emily dies. Louis draws more cat pictures, creating whole cat societies.

By 1891, Wain's cat pictures are enormously popular, featured on postcards and greeting cards, and changing the perception of cats as acceptable house pets. He hosts cat-themed events and is chairman of The National Cat Society. Unaware of the need to copyright his work, Wain does not profit from reproductions and the family remains in debt. Sister Marie becomes mentally unwell and the family is evicted.

Sir William provides a property at a reduced rate. Marie is institutionalised and Peter dies, causing Wain's own mental health to deteriorate. Newspaper magnate William Randolph Hearst sponsors Wain on a trip to New York in 1907, where Max Kase tells him people love his pictures. After some success in New York, in 1914 Caroline asks him to return to England.

Marie and their mother die from influenza. Sir William dies of gout, and the family is evicted and moves into a smaller London flat. As Britain enters the First World War, Louis hits his head jumping off a bus and falls into coma, in which he sees a vision of 1999. He designs futuristic-themed cat toys. The toys are manufactured, but a German U-boat sinks the ship carrying the toys.

Caroline dies in 1917, and Louis suffers a series of mental breakdowns. In 1924, his sisters commit him to the Springfield Mental Hospital. Mental institution inspector Dan Rider recognises Louis; he had drawn his dog's portrait. He campaigns, along with Wain's three remaining sisters, to raise money for a better facility for Louis that allows patients cats and outdoor access.

The campaign gets an enormous response, as H.G. Wells and other prominent British figures assist. Louis is transferred to Bethlem Royal Hospital, where he has a cat companion. In 1930, he is admitted to Napsbury Hospital in London Colney.

Louis takes his journal and a piece of Emily's scarf out to the painted countryside, where Emily had told him he would find her.

== Cast ==
- Benedict Cumberbatch as Louis Wain
  - Jimmy Winch as young Louis Wain
- Claire Foy as Emily Richardson-Wain
- Andrea Riseborough as Caroline Wain
- Toby Jones as Sir William Ingram
- Sharon Rooney as Josephine Wain
- Aimee Lou Wood as Claire Wain
  - Cassia McCarthy as young Claire Wain
- Hayley Squires as Marie Wain
  - Anya McKenna-Bruce as young Marie Wain
- Stacy Martin as Felicie Wain
  - Indica Watson as young Felicie Wain
- Phoebe Nicholls as Mrs. Wain
- Adeel Akhtar as Dan Rider
- Julian Barratt as Dr. Elphick
- Dorothy Atkinson as Mrs. DuFrayne
- Sophia Di Martino as Judith
- Daniel Rigby as Bendigo
- Olivier Richters as Journeyman Boxer
- Olivia Colman as The Narrator
- Asim Chaudhry as Herbert Railton
- Taika Waititi as Max Kase
- Nick Cave as H. G. Wells
- Richard Ayoade as Henry Wood
- Jamie Demetriou as Richard Caton Woodville Jr.

== Production ==
Simon Stephenson's original script was selected for the Brit List of the UK's hottest unproduced scripts in 2014.

The film was announced in July 2019, with Benedict Cumberbatch, Claire Foy, Andrea Riseborough and Toby Jones cast. Will Sharpe would co-write and direct, with filming beginning on 10 August in London. In August 2019, Aimee Lou Wood, Hayley Squires, Stacy Martin, Julian Barratt, Sharon Rooney, Adeel Akhtar and Asim Chaudhry joined the cast.

In September 2019, various scenes were filmed on the Kent coast. The exterior and conservatory of The Coast House B&B in Deal doubled as Bendigo Lodge, the home that Louis and his sisters take by the seaside. Botany Bay and Kingsgate Bay in Broadstairs also feature, as well as Deal and Kingsdown seafront.

== Release ==
The film premiered at the Telluride Film Festival in Colorado on 2 September 2021, followed by a screening at the 2021 Toronto International Film Festival that same month. It began its limited release on 22 October 2021. It was released on Prime Video on 5 November 2021.

== Reception ==
On Rotten Tomatoes the film has a 69% rating based on 159 reviews, with an average rating of 6.5/10. The critics consensus reads: "Sparked by a pair of well-matched leads, The Electrical Life of Louis Wain honors its real-life subject by adding a dash of whimsy to the standard biopic formula." On Metacritic, the film holds a weighted average score of 63 out of 100, based on 36 critics, indicating "generally favorable reviews".

== Awards ==
Association	Year	Category	Recipient	Award	Result	Ref.
Saraqusta Film Festival	2022	Best fiction film		Golden Dragon	Won	
Saraqusta Film Festival	2022	Best script	Will Sharpe	Silver Dragon	Won	
Saraqusta Film Festival	2022	Best actor	Benedict Cumberbatch	Silver Dragon	Won	
Saraqusta Film Festival	2022	Young Jury		Young Jury Award	Won	
