= John Lyons (linguist) =

British linguist (1932–2020)

Sir John Lyons FBA
- Born: 23 May 1932; Stretford, Lancashire, England
- Died: 12 March 2020 (aged 87)

Academic background
- Education: Christ's College, Cambridge
- Thesis: A structural theory of semantics and its application to some lexical subsystems in the vocabulary of Plato (1960)

Academic work
- Discipline: Linguist
- Institutions: SOAS; Indiana University; University of Edinburgh; University of Sussex; University of Cambridge
- Main interests: Semantics

Sir John Lyons FBA (23 May 1932 – 12 March 2020) was a British linguist, working on semantics.

== Education ==
John Lyons was born and brought up in Stretford, Lancashire (now in Trafford). He was initially educated at St Ann's RC School, Stretford, before he won a scholarship to St Bede's College, Manchester, joining in September 1943. In July 1950, Lyons progressed to Christ's College, Cambridge, where he took a degree in Classics in 1953 and a Diploma in Education in 1954.

== Life and career ==
After doing his national service in the navy for two years, studying Russian as a coder (special), and commissioned as a midshipman, he returned to Cambridge as a PhD student in 1956. His supervisor was W. Sidney Allen. The following year he was made a lecturer at the School of Oriental and African Studies. He was also awarded a one-year Rockefeller Scholarship to Yale, but declined for the more opportunistic academic position in linguistics that was rare in those days in Britain. Lyons moved from Cambridge to SOAS in London, where R. H. Robins was his PhD supervisor. In the summer of 1960, Lyons went to Indiana University to work in a machine translation project; he was chosen because of his expertise in Russian and linguistics. It was at Indiana, in a post-Bloomfieldean milieu, where Lyons gave courses on general linguistics.

In 1961, he returned to Christ's College, where he taught until 1964. Between 1965 and 1969, he was the founder editor of the Journal of Linguistics. From 1964 to 1984, he was professor of linguistics at the universities of Edinburgh and Sussex. He was master of Trinity Hall, Cambridge for 15 years, before retiring in 2000; he was an honorary fellow at the college.

Lyons' introductory texts are Introduction to Theoretical Linguistics, Chomsky, Semantics, and Linguistic Semantics.

He was the creator of a constructed language called Bongo-Bongo, which he created as a teaching tool for his linguistics students.

Upon retirement in 2000 he moved to France. He died on 12 March 2020.

== Honours ==
He was knighted in 1987 "for services to the study of linguistics".

In 2016, he was awarded the Neil and Saras Smith Medal for Linguistics by the British Academy "for his outstanding lifetime contribution to the field of linguistics".

== Selected works ==
- Structural Semantics (1963)
- Introduction to Theoretical Linguistics (1968)
- Noam Chomsky (Fontana Modern Masters, 1970)
- New Horizons in Linguistics (1970) (as editor)
- Semantics (1977)
- Language and Linguistics (1981)
- Language, Meaning and Context (1981)
- New Horizons in Linguistics 2 (1987) (as co-editor)
- Natural Language and Universal Grammar (1991)
- Linguistic Semantics: An introduction (1995)

== See also ==
- Bongo-Bongo

Academic offices
Preceded by Theodore Morris Sugden	Master of Trinity Hall, Cambridge; 1986–2000	Succeeded by Peter Clarke
