= Introduction to Theoretical Linguistics =

Book by Sir John Lyons

- Author: Sir John Lyons
- Language: English
- Subject: linguistics
- Publisher: Cambridge
- Publication date: 1968
- Media type: Print (hardcover)
- Pages: 519
- ISBN: 9781139165570

Introduction to Theoretical Linguistics is a 1968 book by Sir John Lyons.

== Reception ==
The book was reviewed by William Haas, Stanley Starosta and Kazimierz Polański.
