= Will Sharpe =

English actor and filmmaker (born 1986)

- Sharpe in 2026
- Born: William Tomomori Fukuda Sharpe; 22 September 1986 (age 40); London, England
- Education: University of Cambridge
- Occupations: Actor; screenwriter; director
- Years active: 2008–present
- Spouse: Sophia Di Martino
- Children: 2

William Tomomori Fukuda Sharpe (born 1986) is an English actor and filmmaker. After writing for comedy shows and appearing in the medical drama Casualty (2009–2010), he made his feature directorial debut with Black Pond (2011), for which he received a BAFTA nomination. He created, wrote, directed, and starred in the Channel 4 comedy-drama Flowers (2016–2018) and starred in the BBC Two series Defending the Guilty (2018–2019). His appearance in Giri/Haji (2019) earned him a BAFTA for Best Supporting Actor.

Sharpe went on to direct the film The Electrical Life of Louis Wain and the Sky Atlantic miniseries Landscapers (both 2021). He received a Primetime Emmy Award nomination for his appearance in the second season of The White Lotus (2022).

== Early life and education ==
Sharpe was born William Tomomori Fukuda Sharpe on 22 September 1986 in London to a British father and a Japanese mother. Raised in Tokyo, his family moved back to England and settled in Surrey when Sharpe was eight years old. The oldest of three siblings, Sharpe is the brother of the television and film composer Arthur Sharpe.

Educated at Winchester College, Sharpe later studied classics at the University of Cambridge where he was the president of the Cambridge Footlights.

== Career ==
Sharpe graduated in 2008 and joined the Royal Shakespeare Company (RSC) for their 2008/2009 season. He spent a year at the RSC, appearing in such plays as The Taming of the Shrew, The Merchant of Venice, and The Tragedy of Thomas Hobbes, in which he played a young Isaac Newton. He played the character of Yuki Reid in the BBC medical drama Casualty. In 2009, he directed and co-wrote, with his friend Tom Kingsley, the short film Cockroach. The pair's first feature-length film, Black Pond, earned them a nomination for the BAFTA Award for Outstanding Debut by a British Writer, Director or Producer.

Sharpe is known for writing, directing, and starring in the dark comedy-drama Flowers, which premiered on Channel 4 in 2016. Starring Olivia Colman, Julian Barratt, Daniel Rigby and Sophia Di Martino, Flowers is a black comedy that tackles mental health, and follows the four eccentric members of the Flowers family as they navigate their lives and their inner demons. The first series won a BAFTA Television Award for best scripted comedy, and the second series aired in 2018 to widespread critical acclaim.

In 2020, Sharpe won a BAFTA Television Award for his supporting role as Rodney Yamaguchi in BBC drama Giri/Haji—a role The Independent called 'one of the most riotously funny turns since Richard E Grant stepped out as Withnail.' Sharpe directed and co-wrote the 2021 biographical comedy-drama film The Electrical Life of Louis Wain, starring Benedict Cumberbatch as the artist Louis Wain. In 2022, Sharpe joined the cast of the HBO series The White Lotus in its second season, set in Sicily, as Ethan Spiller, a newly wealthy tech entrepreneur on vacation. This role earned him a Primetime Emmy Award nomination for Outstanding Supporting Actor in a Drama Series.

In 2023, Sharpe was announced as the director of the film adaptation of Japanese Breakfast frontwoman Michelle Zauner's memoir, Crying in H Mart. In 2025, Zauner said that Sharpe had stepped down from the project. In 2024, Sharpe had a supporting role in the comedy-drama film A Real Pain, alongside Jesse Eisenberg and Kieran Culkin. That same year, he starred in Emmanuelle. Sharpe also began hosting the paranormal podcast Extrasensory. In 2025, he was cast in a lead role in the romantic comedy series Too Much as well as the British series Amadeus. He will also appear in one episode of the upcoming series Prodigies.

== Personal life ==
Sharpe has type two bipolar disorder. He is married to actress Sophia Di Martino, with whom he has been in a relationship since 2009. They have two children, born in 2019 and 2021.

== Filmography ==
Key
†	Denotes works that have not yet been released

=== Film ===
Year	Title	Role	Notes	Ref.
2009	Cockroach	Kiyoshi	Short; also director and writer	
2011	Black Pond	Tim Tanaka	Also co-director and writer	
2016	The Darkest Universe	Zac Pratt	Also director and writer	
2021	The Electrical Life of Louis Wain	—N/a	Director and writer	
2022	The House	Elias (voice)	Segment: "III"	
2024	A Real Pain	James		
2024	Emmanuelle	Kei		

=== Television ===
Year	Title	Role	Notes	Ref.
2008	Never Mind the Buzzcocks	—N/a	Writer	
2008	The Wrong Door	Various	3 episodes	
2009–2010	Casualty	Yuki Reid	51 episodes	
2011	Sirens	Student	Episode: "I.C.E."	
2012	Sherlock	Corporal Lyons	Episode: "The Hounds of Baskerville"	
2012	Dirk Gently	David Cho	Episode #1.2	
2014	The Life of Rock with Brian Pern	Himself	Episode: "Jukebox Musical"	
2014	Babylon	Rick	Episode: "Hackney Wick"	
2016–2018	Flowers	Shun	12 episodes; also director and writer	
2017	W1A	Michael Chung	3 episodes	
2018–2019	Defending the Guilty	Will Packham	7 episodes	
2019	Giri/Haji	Rodney Yamaguchi	8 episodes	
2021	Landscapers	—N/a	Miniseries; also director and writer	
2022	The White Lotus	Ethan Spiller	Main role (season 2)	
2025	Too Much	Felix	Main role	
2025	Amadeus	Wolfgang Amadeus Mozart	Lead role	
2027	† Prodigies	Ren	Lead role; also creator, director, and writer	

== Awards and nominations ==
Year	Association	Category	Project	Result	Ref.
2012	Evening Standard British Film Awards	Most Promising Newcomer – shared with Tom Kingsley	Black Pond	Won	
2012	BAFTA Film Award	Outstanding Debut by a British Writer, Director or Producer	Black Pond	Nominated	
2017	BAFTA Television Award	Best Scripted Comedy	Flowers	Nominated	
2020	BAFTA Television Award	Best Supporting Actor	Giri/Haji	Won	
2022	BAFTA Television Award	Best Director – Fiction	Landscapers	Nominated	
2022	BAFTA Television Award	Mini-Series	Landscapers	Nominated	
2022	Saraqusta Film Festival	Best Script	The Electrical Life of Louis Wain	Won	
2023	BAFTA Television Award	Best Supporting Actor	The White Lotus	Nominated	
2023	Primetime Emmy Awards	Outstanding Supporting Actor in a Drama Series	The White Lotus	Nominated	
2023	Actor Awards	Outstanding Ensemble in a Drama Series	The White Lotus	Won	

== See also ==
- List of British actors
- List of British film directors
