= Language and Linguistics =

Book by Sir John Lyons

Language and Linguistics: An Introduction
- Author: Sir John Lyons
- Language: English
- Subject: linguistics
- Publisher: Cambridge
- Publication date: 1981
- Media type: Print (hardcover)
- Pages: 370
- ISBN: 9780521297752

Language and Linguistics: An Introduction is a 1981 book by Sir John Lyons.

== Reception ==
The book was reviewed by Louis Mangione and Patricia A. Lee.
