= Language, Meaning and Context =

Book by Sir John Lyons

- Author: Sir John Lyons
- Language: English
- Subject: linguistics
- Publisher: Fontana
- Publication date: 1981
- Media type: Print (hardcover)
- Pages: 256

Language, Meaning and Context is a 1981 book by Sir John Lyons in which the author tries to outline the state of play in semantics.

== Reception ==
The book was reviewed by Goran Hammarstrom, Rajendra Singh and Jaime Bernal Leongomez.
