= The Darkest Universe =

2016 black comedy film

- Directed by: Tom Kingsley; Will Sharpe
- Written by: Tiani Ghosh; Will Sharpe
- Produced by: Jo-Jo Elison
- Starring: Will Sharpe; Tiani Ghosh; Joe Thomas; Sophia Di Martino; Raph Shirley; Chris Langham
- Cinematography: Will Hanke
- Release date: 30 April 2016 (LOCO)
- Running time: 90 minutes
- Country: United Kingdom
- Language: English

The Darkest Universe is a 2016 black comedy film by Will Sharpe and Tom Kingsley. The film premiered at the London Comedy Film Festival (LOCO) in April 2016, and subsequently screened at the East End Film Festival in July 2016. The film was written by Tiani Ghosh and Will Sharpe and was shot over a three-year period from 2013 to 2015. It is set on the canals of London and tells the story of the disappearance of a young couple on a narrowboat.

== Plot ==
Zac (Will Sharpe) is a lonely, highly strung city trader on the edge of a psychological breakdown. He has lost everything—his job, his girlfriend Eva (Sophia Di Martino) and, most devastatingly, his weird and wayward younger sister Alice (Tiani Ghosh), the only family he had left. Alice is now a missing person, having disappeared on a narrowboat trip along with her kindred drifter and boyfriend Toby (Joe Thomas). Zac becomes increasingly frustrated with the futile attempts of the police to find them and, eventually, decides to take matters into his own inexpert hands by starting a terribly executed video blog and scouring the dark canals of the UK in a desperate, perhaps even deluded, search for clues. Struggling for information and fast losing hope, Zac reflects on his past and the difficult relationship he had with Alice. Wracked with guilt and regret, his sanity starts to unravel as he fights with memories of her in the weeks leading up to her disappearance. As he remembers her sweetly burgeoning relationship with the mysterious Toby, however, he begins to wonder if there may in fact be a grander, wilder, much stranger explanation for their disappearance.
