= Flowers (TV series) =

British TV series

- Genre: Black comedy; Comedy drama; Sitcom
- Created by: Will Sharpe
- Written by: Will Sharpe
- Directed by: Will Sharpe
- Starring: Olivia Colman; Julian Barratt; Daniel Rigby; Sophia Di Martino; Will Sharpe
- Country of origin: United Kingdom
- No. of series: 2
- No. of episodes: 12

Production
- Executive producer: Diederick Santer
- Producer: Naomi De Pear
- Production companies: Kudos; Seeso

Original release
- Network: Channel 4 (UK); Seeso (US)
- Release: 25 April 2016 – 15 June 2018

Flowers is a British black comedy drama series created, written and directed by Will Sharpe and starring Olivia Colman and Julian Barratt. It was commissioned by the British broadcaster Channel 4, in association with the American TV streaming service Seeso.

The first series premiered in the UK with two episodes on 25 April 2016 and was broadcast daily during the week, ending on 29 April. In the United States, all 6 episodes were released online on 5 May 2016. The series concluded with a second series following the same pattern, premiering with two episodes on 11 June 2018, in the UK, followed by an episode daily during that week.

== Synopsis ==
The series follows the Flowers family, consisting of depressed father and children's author Maurice (Barratt); music teacher wife Deborah (Colman), their 25-year-old twin children: inventor son Donald (Daniel Rigby) and musician daughter Amy (Sophia Di Martino); Maurice's senile mother Hattie (Leila Hoffman); and Maurice's Japanese illustrator Shun (Sharpe).

== Cast ==
- Olivia Colman as Deborah Flowers
- Julian Barratt as Maurice Flowers
- Will Sharpe as Shun
- Colin Hurley as Barry
- Daniel Rigby as Donald Flowers
- Sophia Di Martino as Amy Flowers
- Leila Hoffman as Hattie Flowers
- Georgina Campbell as Abigail (series 1)
- Angus Wright as George (series 1)
- Harriet Walter as Hylda (series 2)

== Episodes ==
=== Series overview ===
Series	Episodes	Originally released	
Series	Episodes	First released	Last released
1	6	25 April 2016	29 April 2016
2	6	11 June 2018	15 June 2018

=== Series 1 (2016) ===
No. overall	No. in season	Title	Directed by	Written by	Original release date	US air date	UK viewers (millions)
1	1	"Episode 1"	Will Sharpe	Will Sharpe	25 April 2016	5 May 2016	1.26
2	2	"Episode 2"	Will Sharpe	Will Sharpe	25 April 2016	5 May 2016	1.26
3	3	"Episode 3"	Will Sharpe	Will Sharpe	26 April 2016	5 May 2016	0.94
4	4	"Episode 4"	Will Sharpe	Will Sharpe	27 April 2016	5 May 2016	N/A
5	5	"Episode 5"	Will Sharpe	Will Sharpe	28 April 2016	5 May 2016	N/A
6	6	"Episode 6"	Will Sharpe	Will Sharpe	29 April 2016	5 May 2016	0.86

=== Series 2 (2018) ===
In May 2018, Channel 4 released a trailer for the second series of the show. It began broadcasting with two episodes on 11 June 2018.

No. overall	No. in season	Title	Directed by	Written by	Original release date	UK viewers (millions)
7	1	"Episode 1"	Will Sharpe	Will Sharpe	11 June 2018	N/A
8	2	"Episode 2"	Will Sharpe	Will Sharpe	11 June 2018	N/A
9	3	"Episode 3"	Will Sharpe	Will Sharpe	12 June 2018	N/A
10	4	"Episode 4"	Will Sharpe	Will Sharpe	13 June 2018	N/A
11	5	"Episode 5"	Will Sharpe	Will Sharpe	14 June 2018	N/A
12	6	"Episode 6"	Will Sharpe	Will Sharpe	15 June 2018	N/A

== DVD ==
The complete series 1 was released on DVD in June 2016 by Dazzler Media, while the complete second series was released on DVD in September 2018.

== Reception ==
Reviews for the series were positive. Review aggregator website Rotten Tomatoes rated it 100% "fresh" based on 10 reviews. The site's critical consensus reads, "A flourishing blend of family drama and melancholic madness, Flowers is a twisted treat." The Guardian praised the series and called it "a gloriously dark sitcom about depression and rage". The New York Times also reviewed it positively saying, "Flowers isn't really about any particular story. It's a portrait – a weird, Edward Gorey-like portrait of a family with loves, suspicions and insecurities, perhaps not all that different from yours, after all."

Reception of the second series was similarly positive, once again garnering a 100% "fresh" score on Rotten Tomatoes based on 9 reviews. The site's critical consensus reads, "Singular, sensational, and very-nearly-too-much -- in the best kind of way." Writing for The Guardian, Sam Wollaston awarded four stars out of five, stating: "The second series of Will Sharpe’s deeply imaginative comedy drama has been serious and sensitive in its handling of difficult issues, and hilarious to boot."

=== Accolades ===
Year	Award	Category	Nominee	Result	Ref.
2016	Royal Television Society Craft & Design Awards	Editing - Entertainment and Comedy	Selina MacArthur	Won	
2016	Royal Television Society Craft & Design Awards	Music - Original Score	Arthur Sharpe	Won	
2016	Royal Television Society Craft & Design Awards	Production Design - Drama	Luana Hanson	Nominated	
2017	British Academy Television Awards	Best Scripted Comedy	Will Sharpe, Naomi de Pear, Diederick Santer, Jane Featherstone	Nominated	
2017	Diversity in Media Awards	Programme of the Year	Flowers	Nominated	
2018	Royal Television Society Craft & Design Awards	Picture Enhancement	Dan Coles	Nominated	
2018	Royal Television Society Craft & Design Awards	Make Up Design - Drama	Sjaan Gillings	Nominated	
2019	Ivor Novello Awards	Best Television Soundtrack	Arthur Sharpe	Nominated	
