= Henry Bradley =

British philologist and lexicographer

Bradley in 1917.

Henry Bradley, FBA (3 December 1845 – 23 May 1923) was a British philologist and lexicographer who succeeded James Murray as senior editor of the Oxford English Dictionary (OED).

== Early life ==
Bradley had humble beginnings as a farmer's son in Nottinghamshire, but by adolescence, he was already steeped in several languages of Classical learning, and he is supposed to have learned Russian in only 14 days. Simon Winchester records that some of Bradley's childhood notebooks, discovered by a friend, contained

...lists of words peculiar to the Pentateuch or Isaiah, Hebrew singletons, the form of the verb to be in Algerine, Arabic, bardic and cuneiform lettering, Arabisms and Chaldaisms in the New Testament, with vocabularies that imply he was reading Homer, Virgil, Sallust and the Hebrew Old Testament at the same time. In another group the notes pass from the life of Antar ben Toofail by 'Admar' (apparently of the age of Haroun Arrashid) to the rules of Latin verse, Hakluyt and Hebrew accents, whereupon follow notes on Sir William Hamilton and Dugald Stewart and a translation of parts of Aeschylus' Prometheus...

For a long time, he was employed as a correspondence clerk for a cutlery firm in Sheffield. The first public outlet for his erudition was as a columnist in the Academy, a weekly literary magazine run by J. S. Cotton in London.

== Oxford English Dictionary ==
Bradley came to James Murray's attention in February 1884 when he reviewed the first fascicle of the OED, A–Ant, in the Academy. Bradley's review praised the clear format and simple design of the dictionary and its economy in using quotations, but it also challenged Murray's etymology, and this caused quite a stir. At the time, Bradley was an unknown freelance writer with no official academic credentials, yet his essay, showing a close knowledge of several languages, contained criticism that none of Murray's colleagues had been able to provide. Anemone could not correctly be rendered as "daughter of the wind," for example, because the Greek suffix was not "exclusively patronymic," and alpaca was not Arabic in origin, as Murray had written, but more likely Spanish.

Bradley's triumph was that both his praise and his criticism were fair and well-tempered; he was admiring without being sycophantic and corrective without being hostile. Recognizing that he had found a worthy peer who could prove invaluable in creating the Dictionary, Murray hired Bradley, first as an assistant editor, then as joint senior editor.

He has been overshadowed by James Murray, and it must be conceded that Bradley was a slower, less durable worker, frequently ill. However, he remains a noteworthy linguistic scholar, largely self-taught.

== Other work and honours ==
After starting work on the OED, Bradley began to get the recognition he deserved, receiving honorary degrees from Oxford and Heidelberg and becoming a fellow of Magdalen College and the British Academy. He also served as President of London's Philological Society and helped found the Society for Pure English (SPE), along with Henry Watson Fowler and others.

Henry Bradley contributed to the Dictionary of National Biography and the 11th edition of the Encyclopædia Britannica. He is the author, for example, for the article on Caedmon, the first English Christian poet.

Bradley's most interesting book is The Making of English, the culmination of a philological life. It assesses change in English and the reasons for its borrowings from other tongues down through history, all without resorting to the obscure sets of symbols so unhappily relied on by specialised linguistics. In his Author's Preface, Bradley addresses the book "to educated readers unversed in philology," and he succeeds in popularising his speciality and making it readable rather than resorting to jargon, which he considered an affront to plain English.

== Death and reputation ==
It was for the SPE that Bradley wrote his last piece, an introduction to "Tract No. XIV: On the Terms Briton, British, Britisher". He wrote the first three paragraphs, suffered a stroke, and died two days later. The piece was finished by Robert Bridges and published along with Fowler's "Preposition at End" and a brief obituary.

Simon Winchester's The Meaning of Everything is the history of the OED which treats Bradley in most depth.

== Works ==
- The story of the Goths, from the earliest times to the end of the Gothic dominion in Spain (1887)
- Oxford English Dictionary (1888–1923): E, F–G, L, M, S–Sh, St, and part of W
- The Making of English (1904)
- "English place-names". Essays and studies: by members of the English Association. 1: 7–41. 1910. ISSN 1359-1746. Wikidata Q107730082.
- Collected Papers of Henry Bradley (1928) contains his shorter works, with a memoir by Robert Bridges
