= Linguistic Semantics: An Introduction =

Book by Sir John Lyons

Linguistic Semantics: An introduction
- Author: Sir John Lyons
- Language: English
- Subject: semantics
- Publisher: Cambridge University Press
- Publication date: 1995
- Media type: Print (hardcover)
- Pages: 376
- ISBN: 9780521438773

Linguistic Semantics: An introduction is a 1995 book by Sir John Lyons designed as an introductory text for the study of semantics within college-level linguistics.

== Reception ==
The book was reviewed by Varol Akman and Edgar C. Polome.
