= New Horizons in Linguistics =

Book edited by Sir John Lyons

- Author: Sir John Lyons (editor)
- Language: English
- Subject: linguistics
- Publisher: Penguin Books
- Publication date: 1970
- Media type: Print
- Pages: 358

New Horizons in Linguistics is a 1970 book edited by Sir John Lyons. It includes essays by D. B. Fry, John Laver, Erik Fudge, P. H. Matthews, MAK Halliday, Manfred Bierwisch, James Peter Thorne, Janet Dean Fodor, M. F. Bott, J. C. Marshall, Robin Campbell, Roger Wales, P. N. Johnson-Laird, Herbert H. Clark, John Bernard Pride and Paul Kiparsky.

== Reception ==
The book was reviewed by C. E. Bazell and Norman Mundhenk.
