= Helen de Hoop =

Dutch linguist

- Born: March 15, 1964 (age 62); Oud-Beijerland

Academic background
- Education: Groningen University (PhD)
- Thesis: Case configuration and noun phrase interpretation (1992)

Academic work
- Discipline: linguistics
- Sub-discipline: semantics
- Institutions: Radboud University Nijmegen

Helen de Hoop (born 1964) is a Dutch linguist and Professor of Theoretical Linguistics at Radboud University Nijmegen. She is known for her works on the relationship between the form and interpretation of language.

== Education and career ==
de Hoop has an M.A. (1987) and a Ph.D. (1992) from the University of Groningen. As of 2022 her dissertation has been cited over 840 times. She did postdoctoral work at the Utrecht University from 1997 until 2000. In 2001 she joined Radboud University Nijmegen where she was promoted to professor in 2007. de Hoop has been editor at the Journal of Linguistics since 2015.

== Selected publications ==
de Hoop has over 150 publications with an h-index of 32.

- Hendriks, Petra; de Hoop, Helen (2001). "Optimality Theoretic Semantics". Linguistics and Philosophy. 24 (1): 1–32. doi:10.1023/A:1005607111810. hdl:2066/104537. S2CID 61042428.
- de Hoop, Helen; Malchukov, Andrej L. (2008-10-01). "Case-Marking Strategies". Linguistic Inquiry. 39 (4): 565–587. doi:10.1162/ling.2008.39.4.565. hdl:2066/67660. ISSN 0024-3892. S2CID 18155459.
- de Hoop, Helen; Malchukov, Andrej (2007-09-01). "On fluid differential case marking: A bidirectional OT approach". Lingua. 117 (9): 1636–1656. doi:10.1016/j.lingua.2006.06.010. hdl:2066/44503. ISSN 0024-3841.
