= Eugénie Henderson =

British linguist and academic

Professor Eugénie Henderson FBA
- Born: Eugénie Jane Andrina Henderson; 2 October 1914; Newcastle upon Tyne, England
- Died: 27 July 1989 (aged 74); Camden, London, England
- Spouse: George Meier (m. 1941)
- Children: 5

Academic background
- Education: University College, London

Academic work
- Discipline: Linguistics
- Sub-discipline: Phonetics; East Asian languages
- Institutions: University College, London; School of Oriental and African Studies; University of London

Eugénie Jane Andrina Henderson FBA (2 October 1914 – 27 July 1989) was a British linguist and academic, specialising in phonetics. From 1964 to 1982, she was Professor of Phonetics at the University of London. She served as Chair of the Linguistics Association of Great Britain from 1977 to 1980, and President of the Philological Society from 1984 to 1988.

== Early life and education ==
Henderson was born on 2 October 1914 at Rose Villa, Archbold Terrace, Newcastle upon Tyne, England. She was the daughter of William Alexander Cruickshank Henderson, a civil engineer, and his wife Pansy Viola (née Schürer). She was educated in London. She studied English at University College, London, graduating with first class Bachelor of Arts (BA) degree. Daniel Jones, one of her lecturers, "encouraged her to study the phonetics of south-east Asian languages".

== Academic career ==
In 1936, Henderson became an adviser on the pronunciation of names in foreign languages at the BBC. In 1937, she was appointed a lecturer in the Department of Phonetics of University College, London. With the outbreak of the Second World War, she joined the civil service: she worked in the Ministry of Economic Warfare as a temporary assistant principal between 1939 and 1941. When Japan entered the war in late 1941, the British government realised that there was an urgent need for language training. She therefore returned to academia and was appointed a lecturer in phonetics at the School of Oriental and African Studies, University of London in 1942. The Department of Phonetics and Linguistics, to which she was assigned, spent the rest of the war teaching Japanese and other Far Eastern languages to military personnel.

In 1946, the Department of South-East Asia and the Islands was re-established and expanded. Lecturers appointed to this department were also members of the Department of Phonetics and Linguistics where they were supervised by Henderson. She was promoted to senior lecturer in Phonetics in 1946. She was appointed Reader in Phonetics in 1953. In 1954, she was a visiting professor at Rangoon University, and undertook fieldwork in the Bwe Karen and Chin languages. From 1960 to 1966, she was the acting head of the Department of South-East Asia and the Islands. She was made Professor of Phonetics in 1964; this was made into an established chair two years later. She was head of the Department of Phonetics and Linguistics between 1966 and 1970. She retired in 1982 and was appointed Emeritus Professor by the University of London.

Outside of her university positions, Henderson held a number of positions. She was treasurer of the Philological Society from 1965 or 1966 to 1974. She later served as its president, heading the organisation between 1984 and 1988. She also served as Chair of the Linguistics Association of Great Britain from 1977 to 1980.

== Personal life ==
On 8 January 1941, Henderson married George Meier; she continued to use her maiden name professionally. Together they had five children: one daughter and four sons.

On 27 July 1989, Henderson died at her home in Camden, London and was buried on the eastern side of Highgate Cemetery.

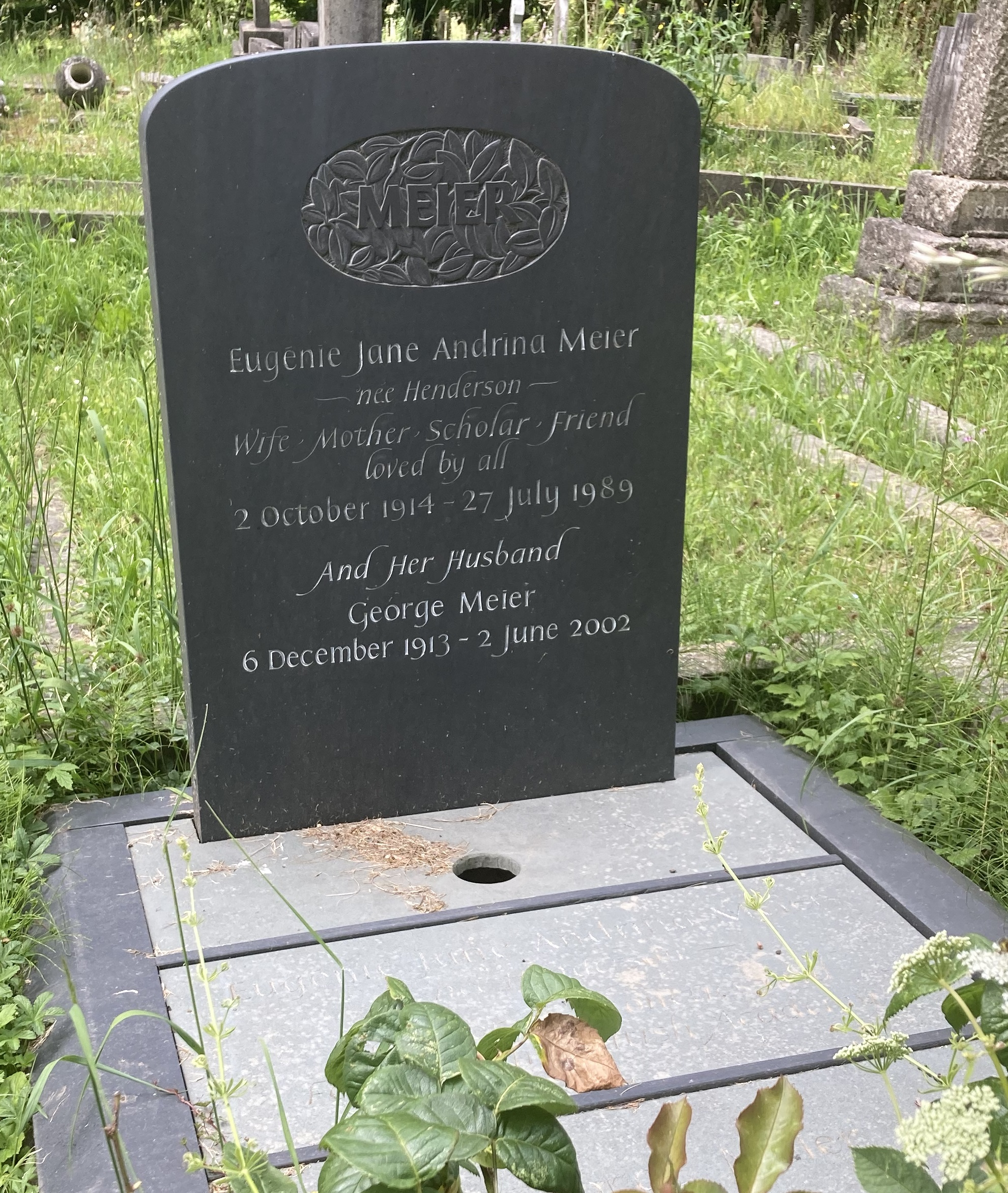
Grave of Eugenie Henderson in Highgate Cemetery

== Honours ==
Henderson was made an honorary fellow of the School of Oriental and African Studies in 1985. In 1986, she was elected a Fellow of the British Academy (FBA), the United Kingdom's national academy for the humanities and social sciences.

In 1989, a Festschrift was published in her honour. It was titled South-East Asian Linguistics: Essays in Honour of Eugenie J.A. Henderson and was edited by Jeremy H. C. S. Davidson.

== Selected works ==
- Henderson, Eugénie J. A. (1949). Prosodies in Siamese: A Study in Synthesis. Oxford: Taylor.
- Henderson, Eugénie J. A. (1965). Tiddim Chin: a descriptive analysis of two texts. Oxford: Oxford University Press.
- Henderson, Eugénie J. A. (1965). The domain of phonetics: an inaugural lecture delivered on 5 May 1965. London: School of Oriental and African Studies, University of London. ISBN 9780901877451.
- Henderson, Eugénie J. A., ed. (1971). The indispensable foundation: a selection from the writings of Henry Sweet. Oxford: Oxford University Press. ISBN 978-0194370394.
- The papers and correspondence of Eugenie Henderson are held by SOAS Archives. Digitised materials from the collection can be viewed online here.
