= Chomsky (Lyons book) =

1970 book by John Lyons

Noam Chomsky
- Author: John Lyons
- Language: English
- Series: Fontana Modern Masters
- Subject: linguistics
- Publisher: Fontana Books, Viking Press
- Publication date: 1970
- Media type: Print
- Pages: 120
- ISBN: 9780006862291

Chomsky is a 1970 book by John Lyons introducing the thought of Noam Chomsky.

== Reception ==
The book was reviewed by G. Schelstraete, Dell Hymes and Abisoye Eleshin.
