= Structural Semantics (book) =

Book by Sir John Lyons

Structural Semantics: An Analysis of Part of the Vocabulary of Plato
- Author: Sir John Lyons
- Language: English
- Subject: linguistics
- Publisher: Blackwell
- Publication date: 1963
- Media type: Print
- Pages: 238
- ISBN: 9780631079200

Structural Semantics: An Analysis of Part of the Vocabulary of Plato is a 1963 book by Sir John Lyons. It is a revised edition of Lyons' PhD dissertation titled A structural theory of semantics and its application to some lexical subsystems in the vocabulary of Plato (1960).

== Reception ==
The book was reviewed by J. Gonda, Édouard des Places, John M. Rist, C. J. Ruijgh, L. Zgusta, David B. Robinson and Henry M. Hoenigswald.
