= Colin Hurley =

English actor (born 1957)

Collin Hurley
- Born: 1957 (age 68–69); Leicester, England
- Education: Royal Central School of Speech and Drama
- Occupation: Actor
- Agent: James Foster Ltd.
- Notable work: Various Shakespearean roles; David Copperfield; Flowers

Collin Hurley (born 1957) is an English actor and a former member of the Royal Shakespeare Company, the National Theatre, and the Shakespeare's Globe company, specialising in performing the works of William Shakespeare.

== Early career ==
Born in Leicester, Hurley first became interested in acting at Alderman Newton's Boys' School when he played Le Beau in As You Like It before going on to act in youth theatre, school plays and amateur dramatic societies. On leaving school in 1969 he spent ten years working in repertory theatres around the United Kingdom when his roles included the title role in Hamlet, Nero in Britannicus, Gus in The Dumb Waiter, Tony Lumpkin in She Stoops to Conquer, (Salisbury Playhouse), Ariel in The Tempest (Gateway Theatre, Chester), the title role in Henry V, The Black Prince in Edward III (Theatr Clwyd), Pip in Great Expectations (Wolsey Theatre, Ipswich) and Dromio of Syracuse in The Comedy of Errors (Bristol Old Vic). He also worked with Communicado and The Custard Factory, playing Tyresius in Antigone, Johnnie in Hello and Goodbye, and the Farrant twins in Corpse! for Vienna's English Theatre. He then studied at the Central School of Speech and Drama, graduating in 1981.

== Shakespeare and other roles ==
A regular performer at Shakespeare's Globe, his stage roles there include The Golden Ass (2001–2), Lucio in Measure for Measure (2003–4), Troilus and Cressida (2004–5), Autolychus in The Winter’s Tale (2004–5), Louis VI in In Extremis (2006–7), Henry VIII (2010), Cardinal Wolsey and Henry Barrow in Anne Boleyn (2010), Lavatch in All's Well That Ends Well (2011), and Stanley/King Edward IV in Richard III (2012), which transferred to Broadway (2013). Other appearances include Dennis in Loot at the Lyric Theatre, Hammersmith (1992), Andrey Prozorov in Three Sisters Two at the Orange Tree Theatre (2002), The Actor in The Woman in Black at the Fortune Theatre (2003), David in Here’s What I Did With My Body One Day at the Pleasance Theatre (2004), and Sir Toby Belch in Twelfth Night in the West End (2012) and on Broadway (2013). With the Royal Shakespeare Company he appeared as Lord Byron in Camino Real (1996), as Horatio in Hamlet (1998), Ulysses in Troilus and Cressida (1998) and Herr Schaaf in A Month in the Country (1999).

With the National Theatre Hurley appeared as Henry Earl of Richmond/Lord Grey in Richard III (1990), as Gentleman in King Lear (1990), Remember This, Wild Oats (1995), The Oedipus Plays, Davison in Mary Stuart (1996), and The Good Person of Szechwan.

== Film and TV ==
His television appearances include David Copperfield in David Copperfield (1986), Prisoner 1 in The Storyteller (1988), Prisoner #1 in The Jim Henson Hour (1989), Ian Harper in Hero Hungry (1990), Ray Murray in The Chief (1994), Colin Hastings in The Bill (2000), Keith Jordan in Peak Practice (2000), Desk Sergeant in The Infinite Worlds of H. G. Wells (2001), and Glyn Hollis in Holby City (2003). Colin also made an appearance in Dreamland in 2023.

His film roles include Grandpré in Henry V (1989), Blake in Black Pond (2011), and Lavatch in All's Well That Ends Well (2012).

Hurley also wrote the plays House and Shuffling Off which were performed at the New Grove Theatre and also has written two short films, Bruised Fruit and Billy Badmouth.

He plays the role of Barry in Flowers for Kudos on Channel 4.
