= Nancy C. Kula =

Zambian linguist (born 1971)

Nancy C. Kula (born 1971, Ndola, Zambia) is a linguist with a specialisation in the phonology and morphology of Bantu languages. She also works on language policy and education and other issues related to multilingualism in the African context. Since 2024 she is Chair Professor of African Linguistics at Leiden University.

== Academic life and research ==
Nancy Kula earned her PhD in 2002 at Leiden University, with a dissertation entitled, The phonology of verbal derivation in Bemba. (She is a native speaker of Copperbelt Bemba.) Following her PhD, she held post-doc positions, funded by a VENI grant (NWO), at Leiden University (LUCL) and SOAS before joining the faculty of the Department of Language and Linguistics at the University of Essex in 2007. She became a professor of linguistics at Essex in 2016 and also held a number of senior leadership roles while there. She joined the faculty of Leiden University in 2024.

Since her PhD, she has continued to research the phonology and morphology of Bemba and other Bantu languages. She has made important contributions to morpho-syntactic microvariation typology (Marten et al. 2007; Marten & Kula 2012), to the study of tone and the phrasal conditioning of tone in Bemba (Bickmore & Kula 2013; Kula & Bickmore 2015) and to tone-intonation interaction in Bemba (Kula & Hamann 2017), among other topics.

Besides this more theoretically oriented work, she has also (co-)led research projects focusing on multilingualism and language policy in Africa. In 2023 - 2024 she received funding from the British Academy for a grant entitled, Supporting Multilingualism in Practice: Resource co-creation in primary classrooms in Tanzania. This grant built on an earlier British Academy funded project entitled, Bringing the Outside In. She is currently (2023–2028) collaborating on an ESRC project on Multilingualism and Conflict.

== Honors and distinctions ==
Nancy Kula is a co-editor of the Journal of African Languages and Linguistics (JALL). She is on the editorial board of the Language Science Press series, Contemporary African Linguistics.

== Selected publications ==
- Bickmore, Lee S. & Nancy C. Kula. 2013. Ternary spreading and the OCP in Copperbelt Bemba. Studies in African Linguistics 42, 2. doi.org/10.32473/sal.v42i2.107270
- Nancy C. Kula & Lee S. Bickmore. 2015. Phrasal phonology in Copperbelt Bemba. Phonology 32(1):147-176. doi:10.1017/S095267571500007X
- Kula, Nancy C. & Silke Hamann. 2017. Intonation in Bemba. In: L. J. Downing & A. Rialland (eds.) Intonation in African Tone Languages. Berlin: Mouton de Gruyter; 321–364. doi.org/10.1515/9783110503524-010
- Marten, Lutz, Nancy C. Kula & N. Thwala. 2007. Parameters of morphosyntactic variation in Bantu. Transactions of the Philological Society 105: 253–338. doi.org/10.1111/j.1467-968X.2007.00190.x
- Marten, Lutz & Nancy C. Kula 2012. Object marking and morphosyntactic variation in Bantu. Southern African Linguistics and Applied Language Studies 30 (2): 237–253. doi.org/10.2989/16073614.2012.737603
- Reilly, C., Costley, T., Gibson, H. and Kula, N.2024. The multilingual university: language ideology, hidden policies and language practices in Malawian universities. Language, Culture and Curriculum. 37 (2), 213-229
- Mapunda, G., Costley, T., Gibson, H., Kula, N. and Reilly, C.2024. Rethinking language: The need for language supportive pedagogy within teacher training in Tanzania. Nordic Journal of African Studies. 33 (3), 184-202
