= John Saeed =

British linguist

John Ibrahim Saeed
- Education: SOAS (PhD)
- Awards: Fellow of Trinity College Dublin
- Scientific career
- Fields: linguistics
- Institutions: Trinity College Dublin
- Thesis: Focus and topic in Somali (1982)
- Doctoral advisor: Ruth Kempson
- Other academic advisors: B. W. Andrzejewski, Richard Hayward, Francesco Antinucci, Fritz Serzisko, Mary Macintosh, Halimah Awang

John Ibrahim Saeed is a British linguist and professor emeritus at the School of Linguistic, Speech and Communication Sciences at Trinity College Dublin. He is best known for his works on Somali language and semantics. He is a Fellow Emeritus of Trinity College Dublin.

== Books ==
- Semantics, 5th edition, 2023. Wiley-Blackwell
- Irish Sign Language: A Cognitive Linguistic Approach, with Lorraine Leeson, 2012, Edinburgh University Press
- Somali, 1999, John Benjamin
- Somali Reference Grammar, 1987, Dunwoody Press.
- The Syntax of Focus and Topic in Somali, 1984, H. Buske.
