= Semantics (Saeed book) =

Book by John Saeed

- Author: John Saeed
- Language: English
- Subject: semantics
- Genre: textbook
- Publisher: Wiley-Blackwell
- Publication date: 1997 (1st ed), 2023 (5th ed)
- Media type: Print
- Pages: 496
- ISBN: 9781118430163

Semantics is a textbook on semantics by John Saeed. The book was first published in 1997 with the second edition published in 2003, third edition in 2009, fourth edition in 2015 and fifth edition in 2023.

== Reception ==
The book was reviewed by Barbara Abbott and Lynn Burley. Burley calls it "a standout among introductory textbooks" and believes that a special advantage of the book is the examination of languages other than English in such subjects as deixis and thematic relations.
