= Semantics (Lyons book) =

Book by Sir John Lyons

- Title page for Semantics Volume I (1977)
- Author: Sir John Lyons
- Language: English
- Subject: semantics
- Publisher: Cambridge
- Publication date: 1977
- Media type: Print
- ISBN: 9781139165693

Semantics is a 1977 two-volume book on semantics by Sir John Lyons.

== Reception ==
The book was reviewed by Jonathan Cohen, Östen Dahl, George A. Miller and Katherine Miller.
