= Ruth Kempson =

British linguist

- Born: 26 June 1944 (age 82)
- Education: SOAS (PhD)
- Awards: FBA
- Scientific career
- Fields: linguistics
- Workplaces: SOAS
- Thesis: Presupposition and the delimitation of semantics (1973)
- Doctoral advisor: Charles Ernest Bazell
- Other academic advisors: Randolph Quirk, Anita Mittwoch, Neil Smith, Deirdre Wilson
- Doctoral students: John Saeed

Ruth Margaret Kempson, FBA (born 26 June 1944) is a British linguist. She is Emeritus Professor of Linguistics at King's College, London.

In 1977, Kempson published Semantic Theory, which discusses the concept of entailment in linguistics. A proposition (P) is entailed by another (Q) if P is true when Q is true and Q is false when P is false, but Q is not strictly defined if P is true. She was awarded a Fellow of the British Academy in 1989. She has made contributions to the theoretical framework of Dynamic syntax.
