= Susan Fitzmaurice =

British linguist

Susan M. Fitzmaurice (born September 1959) is a British linguist. Since 2006, she has been professor and chair of English linguistics at the University of Sheffield as well as vice-president and head of the Faculty of Arts and Humanities. She works on the historical linguistics of English, specialising in historical pragmatics, socio-linguistics and computational linguistics. From 2020 until 2024, she served as president of the Philological Society.

== Academic career ==
Fitzmaurice received her Ph.D. from the University of Cambridge in 1987.

From 1984 until 1986, Fitzmaurice was lecturer in linguistics at the University of Cape Town. Thereafter, she moved to the United Kingdom and became University Lecturer in English at the University of Cambridge and a fellow of St Catharine's College, where she worked from 1987 until 1995. She was appointed Professor of English at Northern Arizona University in 1995 and stayed there until 2005 before moving to the University of Sheffield.

== Research ==
Fitzmaurice was the principal investigator on the project Linguistic DNA, funded by the Arts and Humanities Research Council.

== Selected publications ==
- The Familiar Letter in Early Modern English. A pragmatic approach. Amsterdam/Philadelphia: John Benjamins, 2002.
- Business and Official Correspondence: Historical Investigations. Bern: Peter Lang, 2006. (with Marina Dossena)
- Methods in historical pragmatics. Berlin/Boston: Mouton de Gruyter, 2007. (with Irma Taavitsainen)
- Studies in the History of the English Language IV: Empirical and Analytical Advances in the Study of English Language Change. Berlin/Boston: Mouton de Gruyter, 2008. (with Donka Minkova)
- Politeness in Nineteenth-Century Europe. Amsterdam/Philadelphia: John Benjamins, 2019. (with Annick Paternoster)
