= Kersti Börjars =

Swedish linguist

Professor Kersti Börjars (born 1960) is a linguist who was Master of St Catherine's College, Oxford until 2024.

== Education ==
Börjars was educated in Sweden at Uppsala University (Filosofie Kandidat), and then in the Netherlands at the University of Leiden (Doctorandus) before completing a PhD at the University of Manchester.

== Academic career ==
Since 1994, Börjars has been a member of staff at the University of Manchester, where she was promoted to professor in 2002. During 2002, she was a visiting professor at University of Gothenburg, and she is currently a professor at the University of Oslo.

From 2004 to 2008 Börjars was Associate Dean for Undergraduate Affairs in the Faculty of Humanities. Börjars was Head of School of Languages, Linguistics and Cultures from 2009 until 2012. until 2019 she was Associate Vice-President for Teaching, Learning and Students.

She was Master of St Catherine's College, Oxford from 2020 until 2024.

Börjars was the President of the Linguistics Association of Great Britain from 2005 until 2011. She is the editor of the Journal of Linguistics. Since January 2017, she has been a professor in Nordic Languages at the University of Oslo.
