= Tom Kingsley =

British film director

- Kingsley in 2026
- Born: London, England
- Education: Gonville and Caius College, Cambridge
- Occupations: Film and television director
- Years active: 2009–present
- Known for: Ghosts, Stath Lets Flats

Tom Kingsley is an English television and film director. He is best known for directing the three-time BAFTA-winning Channel 4 sitcom Stath Lets Flats (2018-2021), and the comedy series Ghosts (2019-2023). His debut feature film, Black Pond (2011), co-directed with Will Sharpe, was nominated for several awards. Including a BAFTA for Best British Debut.

== Early life and education ==
Tom Kingsley was educated at Eton College, a boarding independent school for boys in Eton in Berkshire, followed by Gonville and Caius College, Cambridge, where he studied English. He was a member of the comedy group Footlights at Cambridge, directing the Footlights Revue "Wham Bam" at the 2007 Edinburgh Fringe.

== Career ==
In 2008, Kingsley worked as a runner at Blink, the Soho-based production company, after sending them a DVD containing several of his short films. Over the next year, he began directing music videos and commercials.

In 2011 Kingsley and Will Sharpe released their low-budget feature-length film Black Pond.

In 2022, Kingsley directed Wild Blue Yonder, the second of the 60th anniversary specials for Doctor Who, screened in December 2023.

== Awards ==
Black Pond led to Kingsley and Sharpe being nominated for Outstanding Debut at the 2012 Baftas, and winning Most Promising Newcomer(s) at the Evening Standard Film Awards. It was listed as a film of the year in the New Statesman and the Financial Times. and was nominated in the 2011 British Independent Film Awards, and an award at the 2011 Raindance Film Festival. The film was also nominated at the Evening Standard Film Awards, and for the 2012 Guardian First Film Award.

His Channel 4 sitcom Stath Lets Flats has won three BAFTA awards.

== Filmography ==
Short film

Year	Title	Director	Writer	Editor	DoP
2009	Gokiburi	Yes	Yes	Yes	Yes

Feature film

Year	Title	Director	Producer	Editor	Notes
2011	Black Pond	Yes	Yes	Yes	Also animation, visual effects and story writer
2016	The Darkest Universe	Yes	Yes	Yes	
2025	Deep Cover	Yes	No	No	

Television

Year	Title	Notes
2016	Year Friends	Episode "July"
2016	Halloween Comedy Shorts	Episode "Jamie Demetriou's Horror: Oh God" (Also editor)
2017	Pls Like	12 episodes (Also edited 6 episodes)
2018	True Horror	Episode "Hellfire Farm" (Also writer)
2018	Stath Lets Flats	12 episodes
2019	Ghosts	13 episodes
2021	This Is Going to Hurt	3 episodes
2023	Gregg Wallace: The British Miracle Meat	TV special (Also executive producer)
2023	Doctor Who	Episode "Wild Blue Yonder"
2026	Alice and Steve	6 episodes
