= Matt Edmonds =

British writer, voice actor and musician

- Occupations: Writer, voice actor, musician, television producer
- Agent: United Agents
- Known for: Gregg Wallace: The British Miracle Meat; Lost in Lullabies

Matt Edmonds is a British television writer, voice actor, musician and producer. He wrote the satirical mockumentary Gregg Wallace: The British Miracle Meat (2023), authored and presented the BBC Radio 4 documentary Lost in Lullabies, and has written and produced a variety of television programmes for Channel 4, BBC, and streaming platforms. He is represented by United Agents.

== Early life and education ==
Edmonds studied at the University of Oxford (BA) and completed a master's degree at the University of Cambridge.

== Career ==
=== Television writing & production ===
Edmonds has written and produced a range of television programmes across comedy and documentary formats. Notable projects include:

- Writing Gregg Wallace: The British Miracle Meat (Channel 4, 2023).
- Serving as creator and executive producer of the Disney + series The ’80s with Rob Lowe.
- Writing the BBC Storyville documentary The Great Gangster Film Fraud.
- Writing the Channel 4 comedy series The Complete History of ....
- Writing the BBC Three comedy series Voice of the People, featuring Lost Voice Guy.

=== Radio and audio ===
He wrote and presented the BBC Radio 4 documentary Lost in Lullabies, which explores the emotional and musical heritage of traditional lullabies.

=== Voice acting ===
Edmonds has provided voice-over work for the Showtime series Who Is America, created by Sacha Baron Cohen, and the feature film Deep Cover starring Orlando Bloom and Nick Mohammed. He has also contributed voice work to British television shows including Frankie Boyle's Boyle Variety Performance, Alan Carr's Spectacular, Comic Relief, and 10 O'Clock Live.

=== Music ===
Edmonds is a musician and was previously a drummer in the folk‑rock band Johnny Flynn & The Sussex Wit.

== Awards and nominations ==
Edmonds is a Rose d’Or–nominated writer and executive producer.

== Reception ==
The British Miracle Meat received widespread critical acclaim. Stuart Heritage of The Guardian described it as “a full‑blooded roar of a show that deserves an immediate watch.”

Steve Rose, also in The Guardian, called it “one of the best TV hoaxes in history.”

Multiple reviewers described Edmonds’s work as a modern counterpart to Chris Morris’s Brass Eye, citing its use of documentary conventions, unsettling tone, and sharp political satire.

== Personal life ==
Edmonds lives in North London.

== See also ==
- Brass Eye
- Sacha Baron Cohen
- Johnny Flynn
