= Adam Ledgeway =

British linguist (born 1970)

Adam Ledgeway FBA
- Born: 29 December 1970 (age 55)

Academic background
- Education: University of Salford; University of Manchester

Academic work
- Discipline: Linguist
- Sub-discipline: Romance linguistics
- Institutions: Università degli Studi di Bergamo

Adam Noel Ledgeway FBA (born 29 December 1970) is a British linguist, specialising in Italian and other Romance languages. Since 2015, he has been Chair of the Faculty of Modern and Medieval Languages at the University of Cambridge; he has also been Professor of Italian and Romance Linguistics at the University since 2013 and a Fellow of Downing College, Cambridge, since 1996 (having previously been a Research Fellow there for a year). After completing his undergraduate degree at the University of Salford, Ledgeway studied for his master's degree at the University of Manchester, which also awarded him his doctorate in 1996. He took up a temporary assistant lectureship at Cambridge in 1997, which was made permanent the following year, before being promoted to lecturer in 2001 and senior lecturer three years later. Since September 2024, he has been a full professor of Italian Linguistics at Università degli Studi di Bergamo.

== Honours ==
In July 2017, Ledgeway was elected a Fellow of the British Academy (FBA), the United Kingdom's national academy for the humanities and social sciences.

== Selected works ==
The following are books which Ledgeway has edited or authored:

- A Comparative Syntax of the Dialects of Southern Italy: A Minimalist Approach (Oxford: Blackwell, 2000).
- (Edited with Anna Laura Lepschy) Didattica della lingua italiana: Testo e contesto. Perugia: Guerra, 2008).
- Grammatica Diacronica del Napoletano, Beihefte zur Zeitschrift für romanische Philologie, Band 350 (Tübingen: Max Niemeyer Verlag, 2009).
- (Co-edited with Roberta D'Alessandro and Ian Roberts) Syntactic Variation: The dialects of Italy (Cambridge: Cambridge University Press, 2010).
- (Edited with Anna Laura Lepschy) In and Out of Italy: Lingua e Cultura della Migrazione Italiana (Perugia: Guerra, 2010).
- (Co-edited with Martin Maiden and John Charles Smith) The Cambridge History of the Romance Languages, vol. 1: Structures (Cambridge: Cambridge University Press, 2011).
- From Latin to Romance. Morphosyntactic Typology and Change (Oxford: Oxford University Press, 2012).
- (Edited with Anna Laura Lepschy) Le Comunità Immigranti nel Regno Unito: Il Caso di Bedford (Perugia: Guerra, 2012).
- (Edited) The Cambridge History of the Romance Languages. Vol. 2: Contexts (Cambridge: Cambridge University Press, 2013).
- (Edited with Paola Benincà and Nigel Vincent) Diachrony and Dialects. Grammatical Change in the Dialects of Italy (Oxford: Oxford University Press, 2014).
- (Edited with Martin Maiden) The Oxford Guide to the Romance Languages (Oxford: Oxford University Press, 2016).
- (Edited with Ian Roberts) The Cambridge Handbook of Historical Syntax (Cambridge: Cambridge University Press, 2017).
- De la Latină la Limbile Romanice. Schimbare Morfosintactică și Tipologică (Bucharest: Editura Univers Enclopedic, 2017).
