= Linguistics Association of Great Britain =

The Linguistics Association of Great Britain (LAGB) is the professional association for academic linguists in Britain.

The association's predecessor was the Germanist Jeffrey Ellis' Linguistic Circle at Hull University which became active in the late 1950s. It was renamed LAGB and had its first meeting of significance on 1 November 1959.

The association has published the Journal of Linguistics since 1964.

== Notable people ==
- David Adger, Professor of Linguistics at Queen Mary University of London, became its 17th president in 2015
- Kersti Börjars, Professor at University of Manchester and the University of Oslo, was president from 2005 until 2011
- Eugénie Henderson, chair from 1977 to 1980
