= Nigel Vincent =

British linguist (born 1947)

- Born: September 24, 1947 (age 78)
- Scientific career
- Fields: Morphology, syntax, Romance linguistics
- Workplaces: The University of Manchester

Nigel Vincent (born 24 September 1947) is a British linguist. He is Professor Emeritus of General and Romance Linguistics at the University of Manchester. He is best known for his work on morphology, syntax, and historical linguistics, with particular focus on the Romance languages.

Vincent was elected a Fellow of the British Academy in 2006, and was Vice-President for Research and HE Policy at the Academy from 2010 to 2014. In 2013, he was elected a Member of the Academia Europaea.

Until 2011, he held the Mont Follick Chair of Comparative Philology in the School of Languages, Linguistics & Cultures at the University of Manchester. From 2000 to 2003, he was President of the Philological Society. He was the chair of Main Panel M in the Research Assessment Exercise, 2008.

In 2007, Vincent was honoured with a Festschrift with contributions by colleagues and former students.

== Partial bibliography ==
- Ledgeway, A., Smith, J.C. and Vincent, N., eds. Periphrasis and Inflexion in Diachrony. A View from Romance. Oxford: Oxford University Press, 2022.
- Adams, J.N. and Vincent, N., eds. Early and Late Latin. Continuity or Change?. Cambridge: Cambridge University Press, 2016.
- Benincà, P., Ledgeway, A., and Vincent, N., eds. Dialects and Diachrony: Grammatical Changes in the Dialects of Italy. Oxford: Oxford University Press, 2014.
- Börjars, K. and Vincent. N. Grammaticalization and directionality. In The Oxford Handbook of Grammaticalization, ed. H. Narrog and B. Heine, 163-176. Oxford: Oxford University Press, 2011.
- Matras, Y., McMahon, A. and Vincent, N., eds. Linguistic Areas. Basingstoke: Palgrave-Macmillan, 2006.
- van Kemenade, A. and Vincent, N., eds. Parameters of Morphosyntactic Change. Cambridge: Cambridge University Press, 1997.
- Benincà, P., Cinque, G., De Mauro, T. and Vincent, N., eds. Italiano e dialetti nel tempo. Rome: Bulzoni, 1996.

== Home page ==
Personal home pagel
