= Black Pond =

2011 British film

- Theatrical release poster
- Directed by: Tom Kingsley; Will Sharpe
- Screenplay by: Will Sharpe
- Produced by: Sarah Brocklehurst
- Starring: Chris Langham; Simon Amstell; Amanda Hadingue; Colin Hurley
- Cinematography: Simon Walton
- Edited by: Tom Kingsley; Will Sharpe
- Music by: Ralegh Long; Arthur Sharpe
- Distributed by: Self-distributed
- Release date: 11 November 2011
- Running time: 83 minutes
- Country: United Kingdom
- Language: English
- Budget: £25,000
- Box office: approximately £30,000

Black Pond is a 2011 low-budget independent film by British directors Tom Kingsley and Will Sharpe, starring Chris Langham. It was nominated for the 2012 BAFTA Award for Outstanding British Debut.

== Premise ==
Black Pond is a black comedy in which a family is accused of murder after a stranger comes to dinner.

== Production ==
Black Pond stars Chris Langham. The film cost £25,000 to make.

== Release and reception ==
The film premiered at the Raindance Film Festival, and was nominated for the Raindance Award at the British Independent Film Awards as well as two Evening Standard Awards, for Best Debut and Best Comedy. It was nominated for the 2012 BAFTA Outstanding British Debut Award.

The film was also shortlisted for the Guardian First Film Award in 2012.
