= Batley Grammar School =

Free school in Batley, West Yorkshire, England

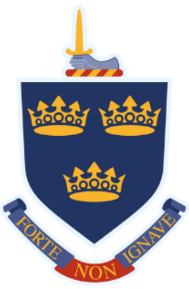

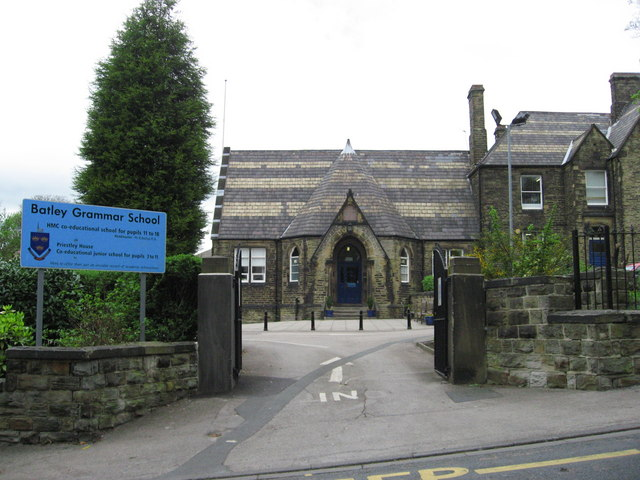

Location
- Carlinghow Hill; Batley, West Yorkshire, WF17 0AD; England; 53.72200°N 1.64073°W

Information
- Type: State school (comprehensive); Free School
- Motto: Forte non Ignave (Bravely not cowardly)
- Religious affiliation: mixed
- Established: 1612; 414 years ago
- Founder: Rev William Lee
- Department for Education URN: 137487 Tables
- Ofsted: Reports
- Chair of Governors: Alistair Hartley
- Headmaster: Amy Wilby
- Age range: 4–16
- Enrolment: 1,006 (as of 2024)
- Houses: Akroyd, Benstead, Lee, Talbot
- Colours: Blue & Gold
- Nobel laureates: Sir Owen Willians Richardson
- Former pupils: Old Batelians
- Website: http://www.batleygrammar.co.uk/

Batley Grammar School is a state-funded co-educational free school in Batley, West Yorkshire, England, for pupils aged 4 to 16.

== History ==
The school was founded in 1612 by the Rev. William Lee. An annual founder's day service is held in his memory at Batley Parish Church, as requested in his will, although it is not held on the date originally specified. In 1878, the school moved to its current site at Carlinghow Hill, Upper Batley. The school selected boys on their performance in the eleven-plus exams, regardless of family background. Following the introduction of comprehensive schools, the school became a private school in 1978 and entry became restricted to boys whose parents could afford its fees.

The school introduced girls into the sixth form in 1988 and became co-educational in 1996. In 2011, it became a state-funded free school. The following year, it celebrated its quatercentenary. A junior school, Priestley House (after Joseph Priestley, an old Batelian) is set in the grounds. The school has had several Royal visits; the Royal family lands on its playing fields when visiting the area. Prince Andrew has visited the school, as has Princess Anne.

On 25 March 2021, a teacher was suspended after a cartoon of Muhammad was shown in class during a discussion about press freedom and religious extremism, which sparked protests outside the school, demanding the resignation of the teacher involved, and a 61,000 signature petition of support. Gary Kibble, the former head of Batley Grammar has offered an apology. Commenting on the situation, Communities Secretary, Robert Jenrick, said teachers should be able to "appropriately show images of the prophet" in class and the protests are "deeply unsettling" due to the UK being a "free society". He added teachers should "not be threatened" by religious extremists. The trust conducted an investigation, concluding in May 2021, that in respect for the community, images of Muhammad should not be used, and lifted the teacher's suspension.

== Notable Old Batelians ==
Former pupils of the school are referred to as Old Batelians.

- Ismail Dawood, former British county cricketer
- Richard Dawson, former English county cricketer
- Andrew Firth, Michael Brooke and Ben Davies, members of indie-pop band The Dandys
- Tim Fountain, Writer
- Lee Goddard, former English County Cricketer
- Cecil Grayson (1920–1998), Serena Professor of Italian, University of Oxford, 1958–1988
- Sir Herbert Holdsworth, 1890–1949, Liberal and later Liberal National MP
- Benjamin Ingham (1712–1772), Methodist and Moravian evangelist and preacher
- Godfrey Lienhardt (1921–1993), anthropologist
- Andrew Milner, Professor of English and Comparative Literature, Monash University
- Sir Mark Oldroyd (1843–1927), woollen manufacturer, politician and philanthropist
- David Peace, Author
- Richard Pearson, former English county cricketer
- Joseph Priestley (1733–1804), theologian, natural philosopher, and discoverer of oxygen
- Richard Reed, co-founder of innocent Drinks
- Georgia Roche, England international Rugby league footballer
- Sir Owen Willans Richardson (1879–1959), Professor of Physics, Princeton University, 1906–1914, Wheatstone Professor of Physics, King's College London, 1914–1924, and Yarrow Research Professor, Royal Society, 1924–1959, Nobel Prize in Physics (1928)
- Sir Titus Salt (1803–1876), textile manufacturer and politician
- David Stiff, professional cricketer
- Samuel Sugden (1892–1950), Professor of Physical Chemistry, Birkbeck College, London, 1932–1937, and Professor of Chemistry, University College London, 1937–1950
- Theodore Cooke Taylor (1850–1952), Businessman, Liberal politician, Profit-sharing pioneer
- Lawrence Tomlinson, businessman and philanthropist
- Horace Waller VC (1896–1917), First World War Victoria Cross recipient
- Lukas Wooller, keyboardist with the band Maxïmo Park
- Thomas Wormald (1802–1873), surgeon

== See also ==
- List of English and Welsh endowed schools (19th century)
