= Lepschy =

Lepschy (German: [ˈlɛpʃi], Italian: [ˈlɛpski]) is a surname, the Germanized spelling of Polish lepszy 'better'. It is also found in northeast Italy. Notable people with the surname include:

- Anna Laura Lepschy (born 1933), Italian linguist and academic
- Antonio Lepschy (1931–2005), Italian engineer
- Giulio Lepschy (1935–2026), Italian linguist and academic

== See also ==
- Lebschée
- Lepschi
