= Bibliography of Italy =

This bibliography of Italy is a list of books in the English language on the general topic of Italy.

== History ==
=== Surveys ===
- Coppa, Frank J. ed. Dictionary of Modern Italian History (1985)
- Di Scala, Spencer M. (1998). Italy: From Revolution to Republic, 1700 to the Present. Archived from the original on 2012-09-05 – via Questia.
- Domenico, Roy (2002). The Regions of Italy: A Reference Guide to History and Culture. Archived from the original on June 5, 2011 – via Questia.
- Duggan, Christopher. The Force of Destiny: A History of Italy Since 1796 (2008) excerpt and text search
- Hearder, Henry; Waley, D. P. (1963). A Short History of Italy: From Classical Times to the Present Day. Archived from the original on June 21, 2008 – via Questia.
- Holmes, George. The Oxford Illustrated History of Italy (2001) excerpt and text search
- Killinger, Charles L. (2002). The History of Italy – via Questia.
- Mack Smith, Denis. Modern Italy: A Political History (1997)
- Mack Smith, Denis (1983). Mussolini: A Biography. New York: Vintage Books. ISBN 978-0394716589.

=== Ancient ===
- Cary, M. and H. H. Scullard. A History of Rome: Down to the Reign of Constantine (3rd ed. 1996), 690pp
- Forsythe, Gary. A Critical History of Early Rome (2005) 400pp
- Grant, Michael. History of Rome (1997)
- Heather, Peter. The Fall of the Roman Empire: A New History of Rome and the Barbarians (2006) 572pp
- Scullard, H. H. A History of the Roman World 753–146 BC (5th ed. 2002), 596pp
- Zuppardo, Emanuele and Piccolo, Salvatore (Günther Hölbl preface). Terra Mater: Sulle Sponde del Gela greco, Gela, Betania (2005), 175pp

=== Medieval ===
- Abulafia, David. Italy in the Central Middle Ages: 1000–1300 (Short Oxford History of Italy) (2004) excerpt and text search
- Bullough, Donald A. Italy and Her Invaders (1968)
- Herlihy, David, Robert S. Lopez, and Vsevolod Slessarev, eds., Economy, Society and Government in Medieval Italy (1969)
- Hyde, J. K. Society and Politics in Medieval Italy (1973)
- La Rocca, Cristina. Italy in the Early Middle Ages: 476–1000 (Short Oxford History of Italy) (2002) excerpt and text search
- Mack Smith, Denis. Medieval Sicily, 800–1713 (1968)
- Tobacco, Giovanni. The Struggle for Power in Medieval Italy: Structures of Political Power (1989)
- Wickham, Chris. Early Medieval Italy: Central Power and Local Society, 400–1000 (1981)

=== Renaissance ===
- Hale, John Rigby (1981). A concise encyclopaedia of the Italian Renaissance. London: Thames & Hudson. OCLC 636355191..
- Kohl, Benjamin G. and Allison Andrews Smith, eds. Major Problems in the History of the Italian Renaissance (1995).
- Najemy, John M. Italy in the Age of the Renaissance: 1300–1550 (The Short Oxford History of Italy) (2005) excerpt and text search
- White, John. Art and Architecture in Italy, 1250–1400 (1993)

=== Early modern ===
- Cochrane, Eric (1988). Italy, 1530–1630. Archived from the original on June 5, 2011 – via Questia.
- Carpanetto, Dino; Ricuperati, Giuseppe (1987). Italy in the Age of Reason, 1685–1789. Archived from the original on June 5, 2011 – via Questia.
- Marino, John A. Early Modern Italy: 1550–1796 (Short Oxford History of Italy) (2002) excerpt and text search
- Roberts, J.M. "Italy, 1793–1830" in C.W. Crawley, ed. The New Cambridge Modern History: IX. War and Peace in an age of upheaval 1793–1830 (Cambridge University Press, 1965) pp 439–461. online
- Venturi, Franco. Italy and the Enlightenment (1972)
- Woolf, Stuart. A History of Italy, 1700–1860 (1988)

=== Risorgimento ===
- Beales. D.. and E. Biagini, The Risorgimento and the Unification of Italy (2002)
- Clark, Martin. The Italian Risorgimento (Routledge, 2014)
- Collier, Martin, Italian Unification, 1820–71 (Heinemann, 2003); textbook, 156 pages
- Davis, John A., ed. (2000). Italy in the nineteenth century: 1796–1900. London: Oxford University Press. Archived from the original on 2011-06-29 – via Questia.
- Farmer, Alan. "How was Italy Unified?", History Review 54, March 2006
- Hearder, Harry. Italy in the Age of the Risorgimento 1790–1870 (1983) excerpt
- Holt, Edgar. The Making of Italy 1815–1870, (1971).
- Laven, David. Restoration and Risorgimento: Italy 1796–1870 (2012)
- Mack Smith, Denis. Cavour (1985)
- Mack Smith, Denis. Victor Emanuel, Cavour, and the Risorgimento (Oxford UP, 1971)
- Martinengo Cesaresco, Countess Evelyn. The Liberation of Italy 1815-1870 (1895)
- Pearce, Robert, and Andrina Stiles. Access to History: The Unification of Italy 1789–1896 (4th rf., Hodder Education, 2015), textbook. excerpt
- Probyn, John Webb. Italy: From the Fall of Napoleon I in the Year 1815, to the Year 1890 (originally 1884; updated ed. 1891)
- Riall, Lucy. Risorgimento: The History of Italy from Napoleon to Nation State (2009)
- Riall, Lucy (1994). The Italian Risorgimento: State, Society, and National Unification. London: Routledge. Archived from the original on 2016-11-10 – via Questia.
- Riall, Lucy. Garibaldi: Invention of a hero (Yale UP, 2008).
- Riall, Lucy (1998). "Hero, saint or revolutionary? Nineteenth-century politics and the cult of Garibaldi". Modern Italy. 3 (2): 191–204. doi:10.1080/13532949808454803. S2CID 143746713.
- Ridley, Jasper. Garibaldi (1974), a standard biography.
- Stiles, Andrina. The Unification of Italy 1815–70. Access to History series (2nd edition, 2001)
- Thayer, William Roscoe (1911). The Life and Times of Cavour vol 1. old interpretations but useful on details; vol 1 goes to 1859; volume 2 online covers 1859–62
- Trevelyan, G. M. Garibaldi's Defence of the Roman Republic (1907)
- Trevelyan, G. M. Garibaldi and the Thousand (1909)
- Trevelyan, G. M. Garibaldi and the Making of Italy (1911)

=== Since 1860 ===
- Alexander, J. The hunchback's tailor: Giovanni Giolitti and liberal Italy from the challenge of mass politics to the rise of fascism, 1882-1922 (Greenwood, 2001).
- Bosworth, Richard J. B. (2005). Mussolini's Italy.
- Burgwyn, H. James. Italian foreign policy in the interwar period, 1918-1940 (Greenwood, 1997),
- Cannistraro, Philip V. ed. Historical Dictionary of Fascist Italy (1982)
- Chabod, Federico. Italian Foreign Policy: The Statecraft of the Founders, 1870-1896 (Princeton UP, 2014).
- Clark, Martin. Modern Italy: 1871–1982 (1984, 3rd edn 2008)
- Clodfelter, M. (2017). Warfare and Armed Conflicts: A Statistical Encyclopedia of Casualty and Other Figures, 1492-2015 (4th ed.). Jefferson, North Carolina: McFarland. ISBN 978-0786474707.
- De Grand, Alexander. Giovanni Giolitti and Liberal Italy from the Challenge of Mass Politics to the Rise of Fascism, 1882–1922 (2001)
- De Grand, Alexander. Italian Fascism: Its Origins and Development (1989)
- Encyclopædia Britannica (12th ed. 1922) comprises the 11th edition plus three new volumes 30-31-32 that cover events 1911–1922 with very thorough coverage of the war as well as every country and colony. Included also in 13th edition (1926) partly online
  - full text of vol 30 ABBE to ENGLISH HISTORY online free
- Gilmour, David.The Pursuit of Italy: A History of a Land, Its Regions, and Their Peoples (2011). excerpt
- Ginsborg, Paul. A History of Contemporary Italy, 1943–1988 (2003). excerpt and text search
- Lyttelton, Adrian. Liberal and Fascist Italy: 1900–1945 (Short Oxford History of Italy) (2002) excerpt and text search
- Mack Smith, Denis (1997). Modern Italy: A Political History. Ann Arbor: The University of Michigan Press. ISBN 0-472-10895-6.
- McCarthy, Patrick ed. Italy since 1945 (2000).
- Overy, Richard. The road to war (4th ed. 1999, ISBN 978-0-14-028530-7), covers 1930s; pp 191–244.
- Toniolo, Gianni. An Economic History of Liberal Italy, 1850–1918 (1990)
- Toniolo, Gianni, ed. The Oxford Handbook of the Italian Economy since Unification (Oxford University Press, 2013) 785 pp. online review; another online review
- Williams, Isobel. Allies and Italians under Occupation: Sicily and Southern Italy, 1943–45 (Palgrave Macmillan, 2013). xiv + 308 pp. online review
- Zamagni, Vera. The Economic History of Italy, 1860–1990 (1993) 413 pp. ISBN 0-19-828773-9.

=== Historiography ===
- Azzi, Stephen Corrado (11 February 2009). "The Historiography of Fascist Foreign Policy". Historical Journal. 36 (1): 187–203. doi:10.1017/s0018246x00016174. JSTOR 2639522. S2CID 159720673.
- Bernhard, Patrick (2014). "Renarrating Italian Fascism: New Directions in the Historiography of a European Dictatorship". Contemporary European History. 23 (1): 151–163. doi:10.1017/s0960777313000556. S2CID 145319131.
- Boardman, Jonathan. Umbria: A Cultural History (Signal Books; 2012). Charts a complex history of literature, religion, art, migration, and industry.
- Dipper, Christof (2015). "Italian Contemporary Historiography. A Snapshot". Vierteljahrshefte für Zeitgeschichte. 63 (3): 351. doi:10.1515/vfzg-2015-0021. S2CID 147390477.
- Ferrari, Paolo (2015). "The memory and historiography of the First World War in Italy". Comillas Journal of International Relations. 2 (2): 117–126. doi:10.14422/cir.i02.y2015.009.
- Foot, John. Italy's Divided Memory (Palgrave Macmillan; 262 pages; 2010). Describes regional, political, and other divisions in Italian public memory of history.
- Musi, Aurelio (2013). "Modern Italy in French, English and American historiography". Nuova Rivista Storica. 97 (3): 909–952.
- Pasquino, Gianfranco. "Political History in Italy," Journal of Policy History (2009) 21#3 pp 282–97, on 20th century historians; covers Italian politics after World War II, and works of Silvio Lanaro, Aurelio Lepre, and Nicola Tranfaglia. Also discusses rise of the Italian Communist party, the role of the Christian Democrats in Italian society, and the development of the Italian parliamentary Republic. summary
- Ramm, Agatha (1972). "The Risorgimento in Sicily: Recent Literature". English Historical Review. 87 (345): 795–811. doi:10.1093/ehr/lxxxvii.cccxlv.795. JSTOR 562204.
- Rao, Anna Maria. "Napoleonic Italy: Old and New Trends in Historiography." in Ute Planert, ed., Napoleon's Empire (Palgrave Macmillan UK, 2016). pp 84–97.

== Geography and environment ==
- Armiero, Marco, and Marcus Hall, eds. Nature and History in Modern Italy (Ecology and History Series) (Ohio University Press, 2010) 295 pp. ISBN 978-0-8214-1916-8 online review
- Arnone Sipari, Lorenzo, ed. Scritti scelti di Erminio Sipari sul Parco Nazionale d'Abruzzo (1922–1933) (Nature and Parks series) (Trento, 2011) 349 pp. ISBN 978-88-97372-05-9
- Delano-Smith, Catherine. Western Mediterranean Europe: A Historical Geography of Italy, Spain, and Southern France Since the Neolithic (1980)

== Politics ==
- Diermeier, Daniel; Eraslan, Hülya; Merlo, Antonio (August 2007). "Bicameralism and government formation". Quarterly Journal of Political Science. 2 (3). Now Publishing Inc.: 227–252. doi:10.1561/100.00005004. hdl:10419/117965.
- Pasquino, Gianfranco (July 2009). "Political history in Italy". Journal of Policy History. 21 (3). Now Publishing Inc.: 282–297. doi:10.1017/S0898030609090137. S2CID 154060795.

Discusses political historians such as Silvio Lanaro, Aurelio Lepre, and Nicola Tranfaglia, and studies of Fascism, the Italian Communist party, the role of the Christian Democrats in Italian society, and the development of the Italian parliamentary Republic. excerpt

== Economy ==
- Toniolo, Gianni, ed. (2013). The Oxford handbook of the Italian economy since unification. Oxford University Press. ISBN 9780199936694.
- Hildebrand, George Herbert (1965). Growth and Structure in the Economy of Modern Italy. Harvard University Press.
- Zamagni, Vera (1993). The economic history of Italy, 1860–1990 : from the periphery to the centre (Repr. ed.). Clarendon Press. ISBN 978-0198287735.
- Welk, William G. (1938). Fascist Economy Policy: An Analysis of Italy's Economic Experiment. Harvard University Press.

== Culture ==
- Campbell, Stephen J; Cole, Michael Wayne (2012). Italian Renaissance Art. Thames & Hudson Inc.
- Peter Bondanella (2009). A History of Italian Cinema. A&C Black. ISBN 9781441160690.
- Luzzi, Joseph (30 March 2016). A Cinema of Poetry: Aesthetics of the Italian Art Film. ISBN 9781421419848.
- Bondanella, Peter E. (2001). Italian Cinema: From Neorealism to the Present. Continuum. ISBN 978-0-8264-1247-8.
- Gaetana Marrone; Paolo Puppa (2006). Encyclopedia of Italian Literary Studies. Routledge. ISBN 978-1-135-45530-9.
- Kimbell, David R.B. (1994). Italian Opera. ISBN 978-0-521-46643-1.
- Garin, Eugenio (2008). History of Italian Philosophy. VIBS. ISBN 9789042023215.
