= Place Names =

2023 book by Francesco Perono Cacciafoco and Francesco Paolo Cavallaro

- Cover
- Author: Francesco Perono Cacciafoco, Francesco Paolo Cavallaro
- Language: English
- Subject: Toponymy and toponomastics
- Genre: Nonfiction
- Published: March 2023
- Publisher: Cambridge University Press
- Pages: 280
- ISBN: 9781108748247

Place Names: Approaches and Perspectives in Toponymy and Toponomastics is a book by linguists and authors Francesco Perono Cacciafoco and Francesco Paolo Cavallaro. The book explores toponymy and toponomastics. Through associating these studies with various disciplines and elucidating key methodologies with illustrative case studies, the volume provides an introduction to the origins, structures, and significance of place names worldwide. It was published in March 2023 by Cambridge University Press.

== Synopsis ==
The book consists of an introduction and nine core chapters in which Perono Cacciafoco and Cavallaro provide an exploration of toponymy, spanning from linguistic and etymological analyses to societal implications. Using diverse case studies from around the world, the volume develops a comprehensive exploration of place name research, covering historical and linguistic studies alongside contemporary naming practices. The authors demonstrate the significance of place names in understanding societal and environmental contexts. Through the ten chapters, various methodologies and approaches are presented, from historical toponomastics and diachronic toponymy to landscape archaeology. The book navigates through the complexities of categorizing and analyzing place names, emphasizing their role as "linguistic fossils". (Note: Some toponyms can survive settlement dynamics and movements of population occurred in very remote times and, therefore, while being still attested, like 'fossils' represent layers of naming processes which date back to prehistoric times and belong to possibly lost languages.) The book also delves into the evolution of naming practices over time and examines the socio-political influences on place naming. Case studies from diverse regions and chronological contexts offer concrete examples of the book's theoretical discussions.

=== Chapters ===
The introductory chapter defines and presents the basics of toponymy and toponomastics.

The second chapter Language Change explores how toponyms, despite their status as linguistic fossils, are subject to both internal and external forces of language change, and demonstrates their crucial role in deciphering ancient writing systems like Linear B and potentially unlocking the secrets of undeciphered scripts such as Linear A.

The third chapter is a guide to historical toponomastics, examining linguistic and extra-linguistic analyses. (Note: Including examples from the Indo-European language family and discussions on folk etymology, toponymic paretymology, and contact etymology.)

The fourth chapter Toponymy and the Historical-Linguistic Reconstruction of Proto-Languages explores the methods and challenges faced by toponymists in reconstructing ancient linguistic roots. (Note: Particularly focusing on the Indo-European language family, highlighting how toponyms serve as valuable linguistic relics offering insights into prehistoric languages and the evolution of proto-languages.)

The fifth chapter explores diachronic toponymy, examining how oral traditions and linguistic analysis can help reconstruct place names in communities without written records, demonstrated through a study of Abui toponyms in southeast Indonesia.

The sixth chapter delves into the enduring relationship between landscape and place names. (Note: Tracing how ancient naming conventions based on natural features persist into modern contexts, showcasing the significance of toponyms in understanding human interaction with the environment across Indo-European and non-Indo-European cultures.)

The seventh chapter examines the interdisciplinary field of historical geography, illustrating its methods, applications in analyzing place names through archival sources, and its relevance in understanding the evolution of toponyms across different historical and contemporary contexts. (Note: Including examples from Italy, Romania, and Singapore, while also introducing the emerging tool of historical geographic information systems.)

The eighth chapter Synchronic Toponymy explores the shift from historical approaches to synchronic toponymy. (Note: Examining how place names reflect social, political, and cultural dynamics, using Singapore's public places as a case study and delving into the concepts of critical toponymies and commodification of place names.)

The ninth chapter studies the intricate sociopolitical dynamics surrounding the use of place names.

The tenth chapter explores the multifaceted relationship between toponymy and cartography, highlighting the essential role of place names on maps, their historical and ideological significance, and the intriguing phenomenon of phantom place names which reflect human desires and perceptions throughout history.

== Critical reception ==
In his review of the book, Swedish linguist Staffan Nyström judged it as a comprehensive and impressive work. He praised its breadth, richness in content, and its coverage of ancient and modern place names from various regions worldwide. Nyström highlighted the book's success in exploring place names from diverse angles, considering linguistic, societal, and historical perspectives. He noted the authors' adeptness at connecting names to the societies and environments where they originate, emphasizing the influence of aesthetics, ideologies, and power dynamics. Nyström found the book's discussion of place names as products of shifting human emotions and ambitions particularly insightful.

Sergei Basik said the work is a ground-breaking college textbook in toponymy and lauded its thematic range spanning from linguistic investigations to discussions on naming practices and decolonization. Basik commended the wide variety of empirical case studies from around the world, particularly highlighting the insightful examples collected during toponymic fieldwork in the context of language documentation. He also appreciated the inclusion of a meticulously crafted glossary, although he acknowledged minor shortcomings such as technical typos and geographical misapprehensions. Despite these, Basik concluded that the book is a commendable attempt to fill the gap in academic textbooks on toponymy and is insightful and enjoyable for all readers.

Remus Creţan (Note: From the West University of Timișoara, Romania) wrote:

This book brings together ideas that conceptualise the practices of place naming. Grounded in a multidisciplinary fashion – from sociolinguistics to geography – this volume is innovative as it examines place names according to their relations with histories, cultures, and societies in order to understand their historical and linguistic origins as well as the role they play in people's everyday lives.
