= Olga Kapeliuk =

Israeli linguist (born 1932)

- אולגה קפליוק
- Born: 1932 (age 93–94); Kraków, Poland
- Occupation: Linguist
- Known for: Expertise in Amharic, Semitic languages, and modern Aramaic dialects
- Awards: Israel Prize (2005); Edward Ullendorff Medal (2021)

Prof. Olga Kapeliuk (Hebrew: אולגה קפליוק; born 1932, Kraków, Poland) is an Israeli linguist.

Kapeliuk, who is professor emeritus of linguistics and African studies at Hebrew University of Jerusalem, was considered among the most important Israeli linguists and researchers of Semitic languages, especially of Ethiopian languages and modern Aramaic dialects. She has earned an international reputation as one of the leading experts in the Amharic language of Ethiopia. With the development of the large-scale immigration of Jewish Ethiopians to Israel, she served an important function as an advisor to the nation's educational system.

== Awards ==
- In 2005, Kapeliuk received the Israel Prize for linguistics.
- Kapeliuk was awarded the Edward Ullendorff Medal in 2021.

== Publications ==
- The language of dialogue in modern Amharic literature [in Hebrew]. Ph.D. dissertation. The Hebrew University, Jerusalem 1968.

Books:

- Q.I. Marogulov, Grammaire néo-syriaque pour écoles d'adultes - traduit du néo-syriaque par Olga Kapeliuk. Paris: P. Geuthner 1976 (GLECS - Supplément 5).
- Nominalization in Amharic. Wiesbaden: F. Steiner 1988 (Aethiopistische Forschungen 23): 171 pp.
- Syntax of the Noun in Amharic. Wiesbaden: O. Harrassowitz 1994 (Aethiopistische Forschungen 37): 129 pp.
- Selected Papers in Ethio-Semitic and Neo-Aramaic Linguistics. Jerusalem, Magnes Press 2009: 579 pp.

Articles:

- Auxiliares descriptifs en amharique. Proceedings of the First International Conference on Semitic Studies - Jerusalem 1965. Jerusalem: Israel Academy of Sciences 1969: 116-131
- L'emploi de la marque de l'accusatif -n en amharique. Israel Oriental Studies (Tel Aviv) 2 (1972): 183–214.
- Traitement spיcial du corps et de l'ame dans la syntaxe Ethiopienne. Journal of Ethiopian Studies (Addis Ababa) 11 (1973): 143–160.
- Les noms amhariques a finale -o. Groupe Linguistique d'Etudes Chamito-Sיmitiques = GLECS (Paris) 18-23 (1973-1979): 215–217.
- Particules d'enchaמnement et de rיfיrence en amharique. id: 241–243.
- Les nיologismes Ethiopiens. id: 321–323.
- Modalies d'action et aspects en amharique. id: 673–683.
- Encore sur ressahu et ressichchallehu. Rassegna di Studi Etiopici (Rome) 25 (1974): 183–214.
- Particles of concatenation and reference in Amharic. Bulletin of the School of Oriental and African Studies (London) 41 (1978): 272–282.
- Quelques remarques sur l'emploi de l'accusatif en sיmitique יthiopien et en arabe classique. Studia Orientalia Memoriae D.H. Baneth Dedicata. Jerusalem: Magnes Press 1979: 225–238.
- Sur le rפle de la forme relative en tigrigna. Bibliotheca Orientalis (Leiden) 37/1-2 (1980): col. 16-23 (main article).
- Evolution de la phrase amharique - la nominalisation du verbe. Proceedings of the 5th International Conference of Ethiopian Studies - Nice 1977. Rotterdam: A.A. Balkema 1980: 97–106.
- Language policy in Ethiopia since the revolution of 1974. Asian and African Studies (Haifa) 14 (1980): 269–278.
- ‘Il semble que’ ou ‘il semble qui’ - un problטme de syntaxe amharique. Studies Presented to H.J. Polotsky edited by D. W. Young. Gloucester MA: Pirtle & Polson 1981: 51–67.
- Omniprיsence de la prיdication en nיo-יthiopien. Bulletin de la Sociיtי de Linguistique (Paris) 77 (1982): XI-XIV.
- Les noms terminיs en -o en amharique. Guirlande pour Abba Jיrפme edited by J. Tubiana. Nice 1983: 275–285.
- Les verbes redondants en amharique. Ethiopian Studies Dedicated to Wolf Leslau edited by S. Segert and A. J. E. Bodrogligeti. Wiesbaden: O. Harrassowitz 1983: 254–274.
- L'expressivitי dans le verbe amharique. Proceedings of the 7th International Conference of Ethiopian Studies - Lund 1982. Uppsala: Scandinavian Institute of African Studies 1984: 39–43.
- La phrase coupיe en guטze. Mיlanges Linguistiques Offerts א Maxime Rodinson edited by Ch. Robin. Paris: P. Geuthner 1985: 191–204.
- Pseudo-questions in Amharic. Proceedings of the 6th International Conference of Ethiopian Studies - Tel Aviv 1980. Rotterdam: A.A. Balkema 1986: 337–341.
- Some striking similarities between Amharic and Turkish syntax. Proceedings of the 14th International Congress of Linguists - Berlin/GDR - 1987. Berlin: Akademie Verlag: 2376–2379.
- Semantic analysis of some morphological phenomena in Amharic. Proceedings of the 8th International Conference of Ethiopian Studies - Addis Ababa 1984. Addis Ababa: Institute of Ethiopian Studies 1988: 697–703.
- Abstract nouns as transformation of copula sentences - the case of Amharic. Grazer Linguistische Studien 30 (1988): 69–77.
- Appurtenance as a linguistic concept. Folia Linguistica 23/3-4 (1989): 341–351.
- Some common traits in the evolution of Neo-Syriac and Neo-Ethiopian. Jerusalem Studies in Arabic and Islam 12 (1989): 294–320. (A Volume in Memory of Haim Blanc).
- Linguistic background of the Ethiopian Jews. In Saga of Aliya translation of no 10. Jerusalem: Ministry of Education and Culture - Division of Adult Education 1990: 39–47.
- Definiteness and indefiniteness in Amharic. Semitic Studies in Honor of Wolf Leslau edited by A. S. Kaye. Wiesbaden: O. Harrassowitz 1991: 809–820.
- Miscellanea neo-syriaca. Jerusalem Studies in Arabic and Islam 15 (1992): 60–73.
- Les fonctions multiples du pronom suffixe d'objet et de la prיposition -la en guטze. Orbis Aethiopicus - Studia in honorem Stanislaus Chojnacki edited by P. O. Scholz. Albstadt: K. Schuler 1992: 153–163.
- Possessive and determining nominal complexes in Semitic. In Semitic and Cushitic Studies edited by G. Goldenberg and Sh. Raz. Wiesbaden: O. Harrassowitz 1994: 65–69.
- The Evolution of irswo and irsachchew as sociolinguistic variants. Proceedings of the 12th International Conference of Ethiopian Studies - East Lansing 1994. Lawrenceville NJ: The Red Sea Press 1994: 1270–1274.
- Is Modern Hebrew the only “Indo-Europeanized” Semitic language? And what about Neo-Aramaic? Israel Oriental Studies 19 (1996): 59–70.
- The gerund and gerundial participle in Eastern Neo-Aramaic. Sprachtypologie und Universalienforschung (Berlin) 51/3 (1996): 276–288.
- Reflections on the Ethio-Semitic gerund. Proceedings of the 13th International Conference of Ethiopian Studies - Kyoto 1997. Kyoto 1997: I, 492–498.
- Definiteness and connected phenomena. Proceedings of the 16th International Congress of Linguists - Paris 1997. Paris: C.D. Rom 1998.
- The Ethio-Semitic possessive pronouns as predicalizers in historical perspective. Aethiopica (Hamburg) 1 (1998): 148–163.
- Regularity and deviation in peripheral Neo-Semitic. In Tradition and Innovation - Norm and Deviation in Arabic and Semitic Linguistics edited by L. Edzard and M. Nekroumi. Wiesbaden: O. Harrassowitz 1999: 13–21.
- Some suprasetential constructions in Amharic. In New Data and Methods in Afroasiatic Linguistics: Robert Hetzron in Memoriam edited by A. Zaborski. Wiesbaden: Harrassowitz 2001:75-83.
- Compound verbs in Neo-Aramaic. In 60 Beitra¨ge zur Semitistic: Festschrift fu¨r Otto Jastrow zum 60 Geburtstag edited by W. Arnold and H. Bobzin. Wiesbaden: O. Harrassowitz 2002: 361–377.
- Languages in contact: the contemporary Semitic world. Israel Oriental Studies 20 (2002): 307–340.
- Auxiliaires et leur omission: guטze - amharique - tigrigna. Mיlanges David Cohen edited by J. Lentin et A. Lonnet. Paris: Maisonneuve et Larose 2003: 9pp.
- Iranian and Turkic structural interference in Arabic and Aramaic dialects. (A Volume in Honour of Moshe Piamenta) Jerusalem Studies in Arabic and Islam (forthcoming).
- A note on the role of linguistic informants in S¥bawayhi's al-Kitוb. id. (forthcoming).
- Focus on the verb in G∞·∞z and in modern Ethio-Semitic? Proceedings of the 14th International Conference of Ethiopian Studies - Addis Ababa 2000 (forthcoming): 12pp.
- The syntax of synthetic verbal forms in Ethio-Semitic as compared with Cushitic. Proceedings of the 10th Meeting of Hamito-Semitic Linguistics - Firenze 17–21 April 2001 (forthcoming) 11 pp.
- Some remarks on the etymology and function of the relative markers in Ancient Ethiopic. In I.M.Diakonoff Memorial Volume: 219-232 (forthcoming).
- The relative verb in Amharic in an aerial perspective. Afrikanistische Arbeitspapiere (forthcoming): 17pp.
- Contrastive Analysis of Some Occurrences in the Verbal Systems of Amharic and Tigrinya. Time in Languages 157–178.
- NeoSemitic: New Verb Forms, New Usage. Babel und Bibel 9 (2016) LEONID KOGAN and NATALIA V. KOSLOVA, eds, Proceedings of the 6th Biennial Meeting of the International Association for Comparative Semitics and Other Studies, Orientalia Classica, 64 (Winona Lake, IN: Eisenbrauns)

Book reviews:

- M.L. Bender and Hailu Fulass. Amharic Verb Morphology in Bibliotheca Orientalis 36/5-6 (1979): col. 398–399.
- R.K. Molvaer. Tradition and Change in Ethiopia in Journal of Semitic Studies (Manchester) 26/2 (1981): 352–353.
- J. Hartmann. Amharische Grammatik in Bibliotheca Orientalis 39/3-4 (1982): col. 470–478.
- W. Leslau. Ethiopians Speak - Muxer (Gurage) in Journal of Semitic Studies 28 (1983): 215–221.
- J.R. Miles. Retroversion and Text Criticism in Journal of Semitic Studies 32 (1987): 207–208.
- E. Ullendorff. A Tigrinya Chrestomathy in Bibliotheca Orientalis 45/3-4 (1988) col 459–461.
- R. Richter. Lehrbuch der amharischen Sprache in Bibliotheca Orientalis 46/1-2 (1989): col. 218–221.
- E. Wagner. Afrikanische Handschriften: Islamische Handschriften aus Aethiopien in International Journal of African Historical Studies (Boston) 31 (1997): 520–521.
- W. Leslau. Ethiopic Documents: Argobba Grammar and Dictionary in Journal of Ethiopian Studies 32 (1999): 71–73.
- W. Leslau. Introductory Grammar of Amharic in Aethiopica 5 (2002): 282–286.
- W. Leslau. Amharic Cultural Reader in Aethiopica 5 (2002): 286–288.
- M. Devens. A Concordance to Psalms in the Ethiopic Version in ZDMG (forthcoming) 2pp.
- W. Leslau. Zway Ethiopic Documents: Grammar and Dictionary in ZDMG (forthcoming) 7 pp.
- S. Weninger. Das Verbalsystem des Alta¨thiopischen in Aethiopica 6 (forthcoming) 5pp.
- Ga¨bra¨ Iyya¨sus Kifle. History of the Origin of the G∞·∞z Language (in Tigrinya) id.
- Y. Sabar. A Jewish Neo-Aramaic Dictionary in Mediterranean Language Review (forthcoming) 8 pp.

Publications in Hebrew:

- תולדות התיאטרון הערבי. במה 59 (1960): 74–78.
- ספרות ואמנות בעולם הערבי - מדור קבוע מתוך העתונות הערבית. המזרח החדש 1960–1962.
- היסטוריה של אתיופיה. האנציקלופדיה העברית 1963.
- איוב לודולף (אבי הבלשנות האתיופית) האנציקלופדיה העברית 1966.
- אפרסתא - תרגום מאמהרית של ספור מאת ח.אי.פקדו. המזרח החדש 17 (1967): 152–161.
- מנליכ. האנציקלופדיה העברית 1966.
- תיאודורוס. האנציקלופדיה העברית 1966.
- אפה-וורק-חלוץ הספרות האמהרית. המזרח החדש 21 (1971): 16–22.
- בעיות בדקדוק מעמת עברי-אמהרי, תיגראי. אורחות 11 - נספח (1983) - דפי הדרכה למורים - משרד החינוך והתרבות: המחלקה לחינוך מבוגרים: 1-21.
- ייחודה של השפה האמהרית. בקובץ אגדה של עלייה - יהודי אתיופיה וקליטתם הלשונית.משרד החינוך והתרבות - האגף לחינוך מבוגרים. ירושלים 1988: 37–43.
- ת ו- ד רפות בארמי חדשה. מסורות 9-10-11 (1997): 527–544.
- הטיפולוגיה של השמית החדשה. "שבע" קובץ מטעם אוניברסיטת באר-שבע, 17 עמ' (בדפוס).
- הארמית החדשה של היהודים כראי להשפעות זרות. משגב ירושלים, 7 עמ' (בדפוס).
- עריכה מדעית:
- מלון קצר עברי-אמהרי עבור משרד הקליטה.
- הלשון האמהרית למתחילים - ספר לימוד לבתי ספר. משרד החינוך והתרבות - האגף לתכניות לימודים. ירושלים 1997, 300 עמ

== See also ==
- List of Israel Prize recipients
