= Robert Gordon (academic) =

Robert Gordon FBA
- Born: 13 March 1966 (age 60)
- Title: Serena Professor of Italian

Academic background
- Education: Pembroke College, Oxford; St John's College, Cambridge
- Thesis: Pier Paolo Pasolini and the work of subjectivity

Academic work
- Discipline: Italian studies
- Institutions: University of Cambridge

Robert Samuel Clive Gordon, FBA (born 13 March 1966) is a scholar of Italian studies and an academic. Since 2012, he has been Serena Professor of Italian at the University of Cambridge.

== Career ==
Born on 13 March 1966, Robert Samuel Clive Gordon completed his undergraduate studies at Pembroke College, Oxford. He joined St John's College, Cambridge, to complete a doctorate; his PhD was awarded in 1993 for his thesis "Pier Paolo Pasolini and the work of subjectivity". He was elected a lecturer and fellow at Pembroke College, Oxford, in 1990, and left in 1998 to become a lecturer at the University of Cambridge and a Fellow at Gonville and Caius College, Cambridge; he was promoted to senior lecturer in 2001, a readership in 2006, and a professorship in 2011. The following year, he was appointed Serena Professor of Italian at Cambridge.

According to his British Academy profile, Gordon's research has focused on "the cultural history, cinema, and literature of modern Italy; Holocaust literature ([especially that of] Primo Levi); postwar memory and culture of the Holocaust".

== Honours and awards ==
In 2015, Gordon was elected a Fellow of the British Academy, the United Kingdom's national academy for the humanities and social sciences.

== Selected publications ==
- (Co-edited with A. Bangert and L. Saxton) Holocaust Intersections: Genocide and Visual Culture at the New Millennium (Legenda, 2013).
- The Holocaust in Italian Culture, 1944–2010 (Stanford University Press, 2012).
- 'Sfacciata fortuna': La Shoah e il caso/'Outrageous Fortune': Luck and the Holocaust (Einaudi, 2010).
- Bicycle Thieves (Palgrave/BFI Film Classics, 2008).
- (Editor) Cambridge Companion to Primo Levi (Cambridge University Press, 2007).
- (Editor) Leonardo De Benedetti and Primo Levi, Auschwitz Report (Verso, 2006).
- A Difficult Modernity: An Introduction to Twentieth-Century Italian Literature (Duckworth, 2005).
- (Co-edited with G. Bonsaver) Culture, Censorship and the State in Twentieth-Century Italy (Legenda, 2005).
- Primo Levi's Ordinary Virtues: From Testimony to Ethics (Oxford University Press, 2001).
- (Co-edited with M. Belpoliti) Primo Levi, The Voice of Memory: Interviews 1961–1987 (New Press, 2000).
- Pasolini: Forms of Subjectivity (Oxford University Press, 1996).
