= Psychic distance =

Perceived separation between objects or contexts

Psychic distance is a perceived difference or distance between objects. The concept is used in aesthetics, international business and marketing, and computer science.

Psychic distance is made up of the Greek word "psychikos" (ψυχικός), an adjective referring to an individual's mind and soul, and "distance", which implies differences between two subjects or objects. Some therefore argue that the concept exists in the mind's eye of the individual and it is their subjective perception that uniquely determines "psychic distance". As a result, it is often viewed as a humanistic reflection of individual acuity and not a collective, organisational or societal perspective. However, in the international business context, psychic distance is frequently measured in terms of national averages or in terms of the national-level differences that influence those perceptions.

In his book, King refers to his preference to use the term "aesthetic distance" rather than psychic distance, as he feels the latter term has misleading connotations in current usage.

== Aesthetics ==
In 1912 Cambridge's Edward Bullough wrote of it in a long paper entitled, Psychical Distance as a factor in Art and an Aesthetic Principle which appeared in the British Journal of Psychology. In this he set down in a reasonably complete manner the concept as it applied to the arts.

Evidently, he successfully influenced thinkers 50 years later. Donald Sherburne, for example, says, "Edward Bullough's psychical distance has become "a classic doctrine of aesthetic thinking." And James L. Jarrett writes of Bullough's ideas, "Perhaps no more influential idea has been introduced into modern aesthetics than that of psychical distance."

The psychical distance construct has been used as an intercultural theme by the arts in the study of creative detachment between East and West. Despite such cameo appearances in other fields, the concept has been essentially "operationalised" by business with the marketing function acting as the chief curator.

== International business and marketing ==
In international business (IB) and marketing settings, psychic distance is based on perceived differences between a home country and a "foreign" country regardless of physical time and space factors which differ across diverse cultures. It is a subjective type of distance ("perceived differences") unlike the distances forming the CAGE framework, for instance. This makes psychic distance very difficult to measure, and oftentimes fallacious proxies are used to estimate it (e.g., Kogut & Singh (1988) index using Hofstede's (1980) cultural dimensions). More accurate approaches rely on asking decision-makers their perceptions towards different host countries (e.g., Hakanson & Ambos, 2010), or using its antecedents to estimate it (psychic distance stimuli: Dow & Karunaratna, 2006).

The business origins of the "psychic distance" idiom can be traced back to research conducted by Beckerman (1956) and Linnemann (1966). As a fully formed concept Vahlne and Wiedersheim-Paul (1973) as cited by Nordstrom and Vahlne (1992) described psychic distance as "factors preventing or disturbing the flow of information between potential or actual suppliers and customers." These factors are associated with country-based diversities and dissimilarities and can be grouped into four clear areas:

1. Linguistic differences and translation difficulty.
2. Cultural factors – societal norms, level of individualism or collectivism, values and customs.
3. Economic situation – existing trading links, infrastructure, local conditions, competition and investor confidence.
4. Political and legal system – government stability and risk of instability, import tariffs, legal protection and taxation levels.

Although the concept was fully formed by the early 1970s, it was the study of Nordic multinationals by Johanson and Vahlne (1977) which followed on from two earlier studies in 1975 and 1976, that is generally accepted as the concept's real genesis. The studies concluded that a firm's international activities relate directly to psychic distance and that further international expansion progresses into markets with successively greater psychic distance.

In summary, companies tend to initially export to countries that they understand; then build on their acquired experience to explore opportunities further afield. In other words, firms enter new markets where they are able to identify opportunities with low market uncertainty then enter markets at successively greater psychic distance. As a consequence, contemporary literature on the internationalisation process cites psychic distance as a key variable and determinant for expansion into foreign markets.

== Other IB approaches to measuring psychic distance ==
The psychic distance has also on occasion been measured through formative indicators such as strong commercial relations, close political relations, historic ties, geographic ties, social ties, country information stock, level of development. These indicators are deeply analyzed for the international market selection. The measurement of these indicators is best accomplished through an index construction. However, the formative indicators are very context dependent. If they were applied to different industries, countries and entry modes, the indicators would have shifted dramatically.

== Computer science ==
More recently, Gairola and Chong incorporated psychic distance to simulate more realistic noise models in spatial games, leading to interesting results, including a manifestation of the psychic distance paradox.

== See also ==
- Business marketing
- International markets
- Presupposition (philosophy)
- Psychology
