= Emotional detachment =

Inability and/or disinterest in emotionally connecting to others

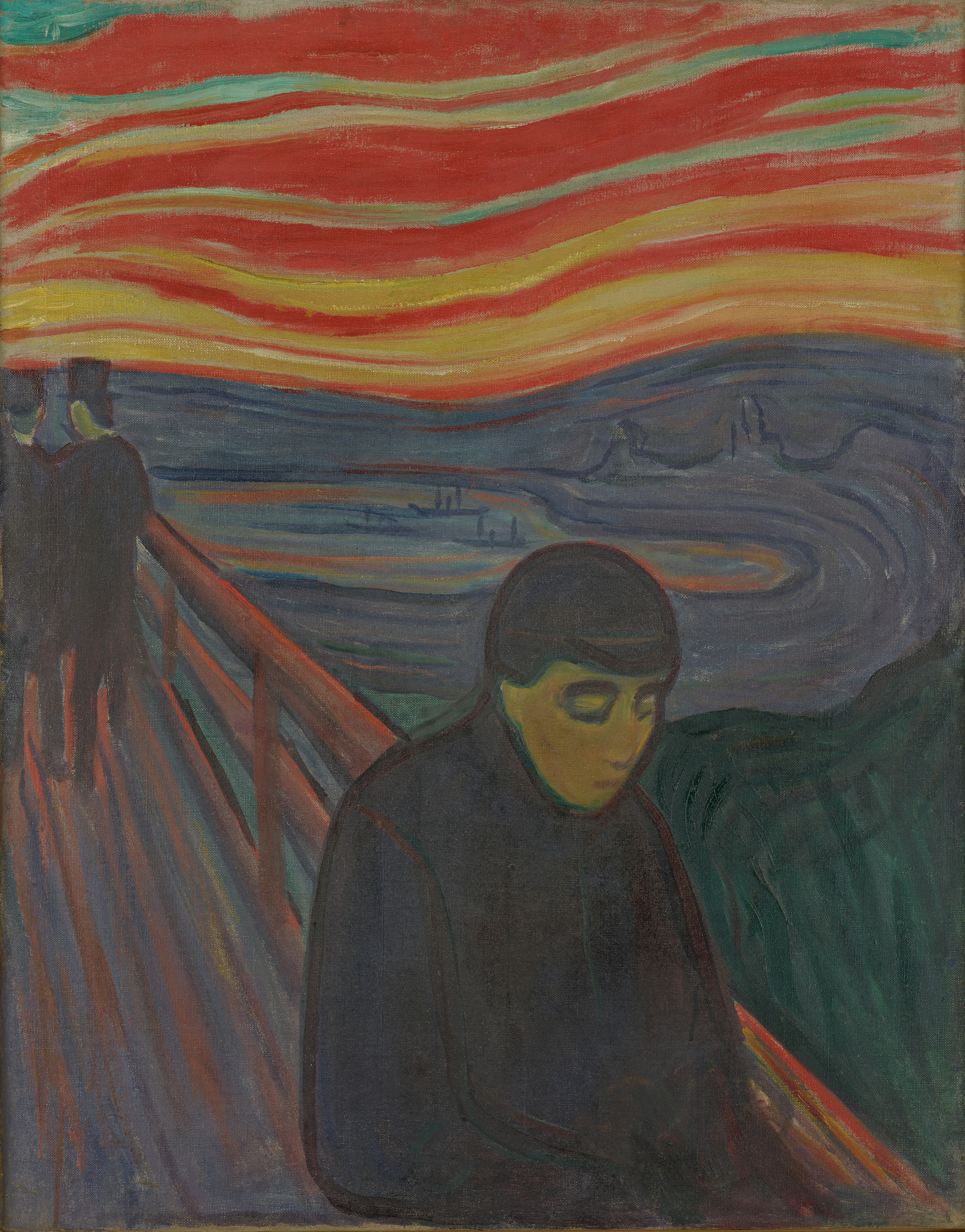
Despair by Edvard Munch (1894) captures emotional detachment seen in Borderline Personality Disorder.

In psychology, emotional detachment, also known as emotional blunting, is a condition or state in which a person lacks emotional connectivity to others, whether due to an unwanted circumstance or as a positive means to cope with anxiety. Such a coping strategy, also known as emotion-focused coping, is used when avoiding certain situations that might trigger anxiety. It refers to the evasion of emotional connections. Emotional detachment may be a temporary reaction to a stressful situation, or a chronic condition such as depersonalization-derealization disorder. It may also be caused by certain antidepressants. Emotional blunting, also known as reduced affect display, is one of the negative symptoms of schizophrenia.

== Signs and symptoms ==
Emotional detachment may not be as outwardly obvious as other psychiatric symptoms. Patients diagnosed with emotional detachment have reduced ability to express emotion, to empathize with others or to form powerful emotional connections. Patients are also at an increased risk for many anxiety and stress disorders. This can lead to difficulties in creating and maintaining personal relationships. The person may move elsewhere in their mind and appear preoccupied or "not entirely present", or they may seem fully present but exhibit purely intellectual behavior when emotional behavior would be appropriate. They may have a hard time being a loving family member, or they may avoid activities, places, and people associated with past traumas. Their dissociation can lead to lack of attention and, hence, to memory problems and in extreme cases, amnesia. In some cases, they present an extreme difficulty in giving or receiving empathy which can be related to the spectrum of narcissistic personality disorder. Additionally, emotional blunting is negatively correlated with remission quality. The negative symptoms are far less likely to disappear when a patient is experiencing emotional blunting.

In a study of children ages 4–12, traits of aggression and antisocial behaviors were found to be correlated with emotional detachment. Researchers determined that these could be early signs of emotional detachment, suggesting parents and clinicians to evaluate children with these traits for a higher behavioral problem in order to avoid bigger problems (such as emotional detachment) in the future.

A correlation was found of higher emotional blunting among patients treated with depression who scored higher on the Hospital Anxiety and Depression Scale (HADS) and were male (though the frequency difference was slight).

Emotional detachment in small amounts is normal. For example, being able to emotionally and psychologically detach from work when one is not in the workplace is a normal behavior. Emotional detachment becomes an issue when it impairs a person's ability to function on a day-to-day level.

== Scales ==
While some depression severity scales provide insight to emotional blunting levels, many symptoms are not adequately covered. An attempt to resolve this issue is the Oxford Depression Questionnaire (ODQ), a scale specifically designed for full assessment of emotional blunting symptoms. The ODQ is designed specifically for patients with Major Depressive Disorder (MDD) in order to assess individual levels of emotional blunting.

Another scale, known as the Oxford Questionnaire on the Emotional Side-Effects of Antidepressants (OQESA), was developed using qualitative methods.

== Causes ==
Emotional detachment and/or emotional blunting have multiple causes, as the cause can vary from person to person. Emotional detachment or emotional blunting often arises due to adverse childhood experiences, for example physical, sexual or emotional abuse. Emotional detachment is a maladaptive coping mechanism for trauma, especially in young children who have not developed coping mechanisms. Emotional detachments can also be due to psychological trauma in adulthood, like abuse, or traumatic experiences like war, automobile accidents etc.

Emotional blunting is often caused by antidepressants, in particular selective serotonin reuptake inhibitors (SSRIs) used in MDD and often as an add-on treatment in other psychiatric disorders. Individuals with MDD usually experience emotional blunting as well. Emotional blunting is a symptom of MDD, as depression is negatively correlated with emotional (both positive and negative) experiences.

Schizophrenia often occurs with negative symptoms, extrapyramidal signs (EPS), and depression. The latter overlaps with emotional blunting and is shown to be a core part of the present effects. Schizophrenia in general causes abnormalities in emotional understanding of individuals, all of which are clinically considered as an emotional blunting symptom. Individuals with schizophrenia show less emotional experiences, display less emotional expressions, and fail to recognize the emotional experiences and/or expressions of other individuals.

The changes in fronto-limbic activity in conjunction with depression succeeding a left hemisphere basal ganglia stroke (LBG stroke) may contribute to emotional blunting. LBG strokes are associated with depression and often caused by disorders of the basal ganglia (BG). Such disorders alter the emotional perception and experiences of the patient.

In many cases people with eating disorders (ED) show signs of emotional detachment. This is because many of the circumstances that often lead to an ED are the same as the circumstances that lead to emotional detachment. For example, people with ED often have experienced childhood abuse. Eating disorders on their own are a maladaptive coping mechanism and to cope with the effects of an eating disorder, people may turn to emotional detachment.

Bereavement or losing a loved one can also be causes of emotional detachment.

The prevalence of emotional blunting is not fully known.

== Behavioral mechanism ==
Emotional detachment can be a coping mechanism, which allows a person to react calmly to highly emotional circumstances. Emotional detachment, in this sense, is a decision to avoid engaging emotional connections, rather than an inability or difficulty in doing so, typically for personal, social, or other reasons. In this sense it can allow people to maintain boundaries, and avoid undesired impact by or upon others, related to emotional demands. As such it is a deliberate mental attitude which avoids engaging the emotions of others.

This detachment does not necessarily mean avoiding empathy; rather, it allows the person to rationally choose whether or not to be overwhelmed or manipulated by such feelings. Examples where this is used in a positive sense might include emotional boundary management, where a person avoids emotional levels of engagement related to people who are in some way emotionally overly demanding, such as difficult co-workers or relatives, or is adopted to aid the person in helping others.

Emotional detachment can also be "emotional numbing", "emotional blunting", i.e., dissociation, depersonalization or in its chronic form depersonalization disorder. This type of emotional numbing or blunting is a disconnection from emotion, it is frequently used as a coping survival skill during traumatic childhood events such as abuse or severe neglect. After continually using this coping mechanism, it can become a response to daily stresses.

Emotional detachment may allow acts of extreme cruelty and abuse, supported by the decision to not connect empathically with the person concerned. Social ostracism, such as shunning and parental alienation, are other examples where decisions to shut out a person creates a psychological trauma for the shunned party.

== See also ==
- Alexithymia
- Anhedonia § Social anhedonia
- Asociality
- Assertiveness
- Borderline Personality Disorder
- Dissociation
- Dissociative disorders (in DSM-IV)
- Emotional contagion
- Emotional dysregulation
- Emotional isolation
- Psychic distance
- Reactive attachment disorder
- Social rejection
- Splitting (psychology)
- Stoicism
- Structured Clinical Interview for DSM-IV
