= Christopher Taylor (archaeologist) =

British archaeologist and landscape historian (1935–2021)

Christopher Taylor FSA FBA
- Born: Christopher Charles Taylor; 7 November 1935
- Died: 28 May 2021 (aged 85)

Academic background
- Education: University College of North Staffordshire; Institute of Archaeology, University of London

Academic work
- Discipline: Archaeologist
- Sub-discipline: Landscape archaeology; archaeological survey
- Institutions: Royal Commission on the Historical Monuments of England

Christopher Charles Taylor, FSA, FBA (7 November 1935 – 28 May 2021) was a British archaeologist and landscape historian. He was Head of Archaeological Survey for the Royal Commission on Historical Monuments (RCHM) from 1985 to 1993, having worked as an investigator for the RCHM since 1960.

== Early life and education ==
Taylor was born at Lichfield, Staffordshire, to agricultural engineer Richard Taylor and shopkeeper Alice (née Davis). He was educated at King Edward VI School, Lichfield, then at the University College of North Staffordshire (now Keele University), where he graduated in history and geography in 1958. Having worked whilst a student for the commission on archaeological fieldwork (later part of English Heritage), he took a diploma in prehistory from the University of London before beginning work for the Commission full-time in 1960.

== Career ==
In 1960, Taylor joined the Royal Commission on Historical Monuments (RCHM) as an investigator. He was subsequently promoted to senior investigator and then principal investigator. From 1985, until he retired in 1993, he served as head of archaeological survey for the RCHM.

Taylor was a landscape archaeologist, specialising in interpreting earthworks. In the 1980s, he led the survey and interpretation of the earthworks around Bodiam Castle in Sussex. The work revealed that the landscape had been carefully adapted to shape how visitors experienced that castle, and contributed to a historiographical change interpreting castles as residences as well as fortifications.

== Personal life ==
In 1961, Taylor married Angela Ballard (died 1983). They had a son and a daughter. In 1985, he married secondly Stephanie Ault (née Spooner).

Taylor died on 28 May 2021, aged 85.

== Honours ==
Taylor was an elected Fellow of the Society of Antiquaries of London (FSA). In 1995, he was elected a Fellow of the British Academy (FBA), the United Kingdom's national academy for the humanities and social sciences. In 2013, he was awarded the John Coles Medal for Landscape Archaeology by the British Academy.

== Selected works ==
- Taylor, Christopher C. (1974). Fieldwork in medieval archaeology.
- Taylor, Christopher (1975). Fields in the English landscape (1st ed.). London: J.M. Dent. ISBN 978-0460041591.
- Taylor, Christopher (1983). Village and farmstead: a history of rural settlement in England. London: G. Philip. ISBN 9780540010714.
