= Stephen Milner =

British scholar of Italian

Stephen J. Milner is a British scholar of Italian. Since 2006, he has been the Serena Professor of Italian at the University of Manchester. He was the Director of the British School at Rome from 2017 to 2020.

== Selected works ==
- Campbell, Stephen J.; Milner, Stephen J., eds. (2004). Artistic Exchange and Cultural Translation in the Italian Renaissance City. New York: Cambridge University Press. ISBN 978-0521826884.
- Milner, Stephen J., ed. (2005). At the Margins: Minority Groups in Premodern Italy. Minneapolis: University of Minnesota Press. ISBN 978-0816638208.
- Léglu, Catherine E.; Milner, Stephen J., eds. (2008). The Erotics of Consolation: Desire and Distance in the Late Middle Ages. New York: Palgrave Macmillan. ISBN 978-1403976192.
- Armstrong, Guyda; Daniels, Rhiannon; Milner, Stephen J., eds. (2015). The Cambridge Companion to Boccaccio. Cambridge: Cambridge University Press. ISBN 978-1107014350.
