= Edward Bullough =

English aesthetician and scholar (1880–1934)

Edward Bullough (28 March 1880 – 17 September 1934) was an English aesthetician and scholar of modern languages, who worked at the University of Cambridge. He did experimental work on the perception of colours, and in his theoretical work introduced the concept of psychical distance: that which "appears to lie between our own self and its affections" in aesthetic experience. In languages, Bullough was a dedicated teacher who published little. He came to concentrate on Italian, and was elected to the Chair of Italian at Cambridge in 1933.

== Life and work ==
=== Early life to "Psychical Distance", 1880–1914 ===
Edward Bullough was born in Thun, Switzerland, on 28 March 1880, to John Bullough and Bertha Schmidlin. As a child he lived mostly in Germany, and was educated at Vitzthum Gymnasium, Dresden. At seventeen Bullough moved to England, and in 1899 matriculated at Trinity College, Cambridge, where he studied Medieval and Modern Languages. He graduated BA (Class I) in 1902, MA in 1906, after which he taught French and German at Cambridge colleges and lectured in the university.

At this time, Bullough became interested in aesthetics, and "prepared himself to deal with [its] problems … by a study of physiology and general psychology". In 1907 Bullough gave a course of lectures in aesthetics, the first such at Cambridge, privately printed as The Modern Conception of Aesthetics. He repeated the course annually "until shortly before his death". Bullough conducted experimental work on the perception of colours in the Cambridge Psychological Laboratory, the basis for a series of three papers in the British Journal of Psychology. Bullough also had an interest in parapsychology, and was a member of the Society for Psychical Research.

In 1908, Bullough married Enrichetta Angelica Marchetti (daughter of the actor Eleonora Duse), with whom he had a son and a daughter. He was elected to a Drosier Fellowship at Gonville and Caius College in 1912, and in the same year published his noted theoretical paper, "'Psychical Distance' as a Factor in Art and an Aesthetic Principle". Psychical distance (Bullough capitalises the words) is that which, in certain situations, "appears to lie between our own self and its affections, using the latter term in its broadest sense as anything which affects our being". Artistic production and appreciation are two such situations.

[Psychical Distance] has a negative, inhibitory aspect—the cutting-out of the practical sides of things and of our practical attitude to them—and a positive side—the elaboration of the experience on the new basis created by the inhibitory action of Distance.

The relation between self and object remains a personal one (it is not like the impersonal relation in scientific observation, for example) and Bullough thinks that a "concordance" between them is necessary for aesthetic appreciation. However this must not be such that psychical distance is lost: Bullough imagines a jealous husband watching a performance of Othello, who "will probably do anything but appreciate the play". This "antinomy of Distance" leads Bullough to say that what is desirable in art, "both in appreciation and production", is "the utmost decrease of Distance without its disappearance".

=== War service to death, 1915–1934 ===
In the First World War, Bullough was recruited as a civilian in the summer of 1915 to the Admiralty's cryptoanalysis section, Room 40. He served for four years, finally as a Lieutenant of the Royal Naval Volunteer Reserve. After the war he returned to Caius, where he had been re-elected to a fellowship in January 1915. He published in the British Journal of Psychology two more papers on aesthetic theory, "The Relation of Aesthetics to Psychology" (1919) and "Mind and Medium in Art" (1920), and a review of experimental work (1921). In 1920, he was appointed College Lecturer in modern languages and University Lecturer in German, and he edited the anthology Cambridge Readings in Italian Literature.

In 1923 Bullough resigned his university post, wishing to concentrate instead on Italian. The same year, he joined the Roman Catholic Church as a Dominican Tertiary, and afterwards was active in the Cambridge University Catholic Association. In the following decade he published translations of Étienne Gilson, Karl Adam, and Achille Ratti (by then Pope Pius XI), and gave three papers on Dante at Catholic summer schools in Cambridge and Salzburg. A colleague believed that his work in Italian studies "all went into his lectures and teaching", rather than research for publication. He was appointed University Lecturer in Italian in 1926.

Bullough was elected to the Chair of Italian at Cambridge in March 1933. In his printed inaugural lecture, titled Italian Perspectives, he claims that the Italian "perspective" is one of "continuity of classical with medieval and modern times", so that tradition is treated "with the easy familiarity of a family possession". He argues that because the European classical tradition is also, for the Italian, the native tradition, "the 'national' inheritance of Italy lies at the same time embedded in the foundations of Europe". In illustration, Bullough proposes Roman law, the Renaissance, and the Romantic movement as "three contributions made by Italy to the patrimony of the civilised world". He offers the contemporary fascist movement as a tentative fourth: a successor to the chair, Uberto Limentani, believed there was "no doubt" that Bullough sympathised with fascism.

After a short illness resulting from an internal operation, Bullough died in a nursing home in Bath on 17 September 1934. He was buried at Woodchester Priory in Stroud. The philosopher Michael Oakeshott, a colleague at Caius, wrote Bullough's obituary for their college record.

The family home on Buckingham Road, Cambridge was offered to the Dominican Order by his widow and is now Cambridge Blackfriars.

== Bibliography ==
Note that Bullough's texts and translations of other authors are collected after the chronological presentation.

- 1904. "Matter and Form." Modern Language Quarterly 7, no. 1: 10–15.
- 1905. "Bibliographisches zu Schillers Demetrius." Studien zur vergleichenden Literaturgeschichte 5, Ergänzungsheft: 290–293.
- 1907. "The Apparent Heaviness of Colours." British Journal of Psychology 2, no. 2: 111–152.
- 1908. The Modern Conception of Aesthetics. Privately printed.
- 1908. "The 'Perceptive Problem' in the Aesthetic Appreciation of Single Colours." British Journal of Psychology 2, no. 4: 406–463.
- 1909. As compiler. Bibliography to General Modern Aesthetics. Privately printed? (A pamphlet.)
- 1910. "The 'Perceptive Problem' in the Aesthetic Appreciation of Simple Colour-Combinations." British Journal of Psychology 3, no. 4: 406–447.
- 1912. "'Psychical Distance' as a Factor in Art and an Aesthetic Principle." British Journal of Psychology 5, no. 2: 87–118.
- 1913. "Ein Beitrag zur genitischen Ästhetik." In Kongress für Ästhetik und allgemeine Kunstwissenschaft, Berlin 7.–9. Oktober 1913: Bericht, 55–72. Stuttgart: Enke, 1914.
- 1919. "The Relation of Aesthetics to Psychology." British Journal of Psychology 10, no. 1: 43–50.
- 1920. As compiler. Italy in the Nineteenth Century: Chronological Tables, with a List of Works Recommended for Study, etc. Cambridge: Cambridge University Press. (A pamphlet.)
- 1920. As editor. Cambridge Readings in Italian Literature. Cambridge: Cambridge University Press.
- 1920. "The Civil Service and Modern Languages." In Year Book of Modern Languages, edited for the Council of the Modern Language Association by Gilbert Waterhouse, 10–24. Cambridge: Cambridge University Press.
- 1920. "Mind and Medium in Art." British Journal of Psychology 11, no. 1: 26–46.
- 1921. "Recent Work in Experimental Aesthetics." British Journal of Psychology 12, no. 1: 76–99.
- 1921. "The Relation of Literature to History." Modern Languages 2: 37–47.
- 1925. "Dante, the Poet of St Thomas." In St Thomas Aquinas, edited by C. Lattey, 247–284. Cambridge: W. Heffer.
- 1928. "Broken Bridges." University Catholic Review 2, no. 1: 7–11.
- 1932? "Dante als Vetreter des XIII. Jahrhunderts." (Cited by Oakeshott, not located and perhaps not published.)
- 1932? "Dante und die europäische Kultur." (Cited by Oakeshott, not located and perhaps not published.)
- 1933. "The Relation of Literature and the Arts." Modern Languages 14: 101–112.
- 1934. Italian Perspectives: An Inaugural Lecture. Cambridge: Cambridge University Press.
- 1935. "'Psychical Distance' as a Factor in Art and an Aesthetic Principle." In A Modern Book of Esthetics: An Anthology, edited by Melvin M. Rader, 87–118. New York: Henry Holt. (2nd ed., 1952. 3rd ed., 1960. 4th ed., 1973. 5th ed., 1979.)
- 1957. Aesthetics: Lectures and Essays. Edited by Elizabeth M. Wilkinson. London: Bowes and Bowes. (New ed., Westport, Conn.: Greenwood Press, 1977.)
- 1969. "'Psychical Distance' as a Factor in Art and as an Aesthetic Principle." In Philosophy of Art and Aesthetics: From Plato to Wittgenstein, edited by Frank A. Tillman and Steven M. Cahn, 397–414. New York: Harper and Row.
- 1977. "'Psychical Distance' as a Factor in Art and an Aesthetic Principle." In Aesthetics: A Critical Anthology, edited by George Dickie and R. J. Sclafani, 758–782. Boston, Mass.: St Martin's. (2nd ed., 1989.)
- 1995. "Psychical Distance." In The Philosophy of Art: Readings Ancient and Modern, edited by Alex Neill and Aaron Ridley, 297–311. Boston, Mass.: McGraw-Hill.
- 1997. La distanza psichica come fattore artistico e principio estetico. Edited by Giuliano Compagno. Palermo: Centro internazional estudi di estetica, 1997.
- 2008. "'Psychical Distance' as a Factor in Art and an Aesthetic Principle." In Aesthetics: A Comprehensive Anthology, edited by Steven M. Cahn and Aaron Meskin, 243–260. Malden, Mass.: Blackwell Publishing.

=== Texts and translations of other authors ===
- 1916. Tolstoy, Leo. Sevastopol. Edited by A. P. Goudy and Edward Bullough. Cambridge: Cambridge University Press.
- 1924. Gilson, Étienne. The Philosophy of St Thomas Aquinas. Edited by G. A. Elrington, translated by Edward Bullough. Cambridge: W. Heffer. (2nd ed., 1929.)
- 1930. Adam, Karl. Two Essays. Translated by Edward Bullough. London: Sheed and Ward.
- 1934. Pius XI [Achille Ratti]. Essays in History. Translated by Edward Bullough. London: Burns, Oates and Washbourne.
- 1945. Bellingshausen, T. The Voyage of Captain Bellingshausen to the Antarctic Seas, 1819–1821. Edited by Frank Debenham, translated by Edward Bullough. London: Hakluyt Society.
