= Patrick Boyde =

British Italianist and retired academic

Patrick Boyde, FBA (born 1934) is a British Italianist and retired academic. He was Serena Professor of Italian at the University of Cambridge from 1981 to 2002 and has been a fellow of St John's College, Cambridge, since 1966.

== Career ==
Born in 1934, Boyde studied at St John's College, Cambridge, graduating in 1956 and then completing a PhD in 1963. After a year as an assistant lecturer at the University of Leeds, he was appointed to an assistant lectureship at the University of Cambridge in 1962 and was eventually promoted to a full lectureship; he was then appointed Serena Professor of Italian in 1981, serving until retirement in 2002. He was also elected to a fellowship at St John's College in 1966. In 1987, Boyde was elected a Fellow of the British Academy, the United Kingdom's national academy for the humanities.

== Publications ==
- (Edited with Kenelm Foster) Dante's Lyric Poetry (Clarendon Press, 1967).
- Dante's Style in his Lyric Poetry (Cambridge University Press, 1971).
- Dante Philomythes and Philosopher: Man in the Cosmos (Cambridge University Press, 1981).
- Perception and Passion in Dante's Comedy (Cambridge University Press, 1993).
- (Edited with Zygmunt Barański) Lettura del Fiore (Longo Editore, 1993).
- (Co-authored with Vittorio Russo) Dante e la scienza (Longo Editore, 1995).
- (Co-authored with Zygmunt Barański) The Fiore in Context: Dante, France, Tuscany (University of Notre Dame Press, 1997) .
- Human Vices and Human Worth in Dante's Comedy (Cambridge University Press, 2000).
