= Samuel Sugden =

British chemist

Samuel Sugden, FRS was an eminent chemist in the first half of the 20th century.

== Early life ==
He was born in Leeds on 21 February 1892 and educated at Batley Grammar School and the Royal College of Science.

== Career ==
After war time service with the BEF he was a Research Chemist the Royal Arsenal, Woolwich following which he became a Lecturer, Reader then Professor of Physical chemistry at Birkbeck College. In 1934 he was elected a Fellow of the Royal Society and in 1937 became Professor of Physical Chemistry at University College, London. When World War II returned he joined the newly formed Ministry of Supply but resigned in 1944 to take up a similar post with the United States Air Force Eighth Air Force. A noted author, he died on 20 October 1950.
