= Brian Pullan =

Brian Sebastian Pullan, FBA (1935 – 16 December 2022) was a British historian and academic. He was Full Professor of Modern History at the University of Manchester from 1973 to 1998.

After completing a BA and PhD at Trinity College, Cambridge, Pullan was appointed to a research fellowship there from 1961 to 1963. He was then elected to a fellowship of Queens' College, Cambridge, in 1963 and also worked as an assistant lecturer (1964–67) and full lecturer (1967–72) at the University of Cambridge. He then moved to the University of Manchester to take up the Chair in modern history in 1973, retiring in 1998.

In 1985, Pullan was elected a Fellow of the British Academy, the United Kingdom's national academy for the humanities. He was awarded the Academy's Serena Medal in 1991 and served on the Academy's council from 1990 to 1993.

== Publications (selected) ==
- Pullan, Brian, (1983) The Jews of Europe and the Inquisition of Venice, 1550-1670, London: Tauris. ISBN 1860643574
- Pullan, Brian, with Abendstern, Michele (2000) A History of the University of Manchester, 1951–73. Manchester: Manchester University Press ISBN 0-7190-5670-5 Selected pages
- Pullan, Brian; with Abendstern, Michele (2004) A History of the University of Manchester, 1973-90. Manchester: Manchester University Press. ISBN 978-0-7190-6242-1
- Pullan, Brian, with David Chambers, (2004) Venice : a documentary history, 1450-1630, Toronto : Toronto University Press. ISBN 978-0-8020-8424-8
- Pullan, Brian, (2015)Crisis and Change in the Venetian Economy in the Sixteenth and Seventeenth Centuries, Manchester: Manchester University Press. ISBN 978-1-1388-6169-5
- Pullan, Brian,(2016) Tolerance, Regulation and Rescue: Dishonoured Women and Abandoned Children in Italy, 1300-1800, Manchester: Manchester University Press. ISBN 978-1-7849-9129-6
