= Bernard Comrie =

British linguist

Bernard Sterling Comrie
- Born: 23 May 1947 (age 79); United Kingdom
- Occupation: Linguist

Academic background
- Education: University of Cambridge

Academic work
- Institutions: University of California, Santa Barbara
- Main interests: Linguistic typology and linguistic universals

Bernard Sterling Comrie, FBA (/ˈbɜːrnərd ˈkɒmriː/; born 23 May 1947) is a British linguist. Comrie is a specialist in linguistic typology, linguistic universals and on Caucasian languages.

== Personal life ==
=== Early life and education ===
Comrie was born in Sunderland, England on 23 May 1947. He earned his undergraduate and doctoral degrees in Modern and Medieval Languages and Linguistics from the University of Cambridge, where he also taught Russian and Linguistics until he moved to the Linguistics Department of the University of Southern California.

=== Personal life ===
He married linguistics professor Akiko Kumahira in 1985.

== Professional life ==
=== Academic career ===
For 17 years he was professor at and director of the former Department of Linguistics at the Max Planck Institute for Evolutionary Anthropology in Leipzig, Germany, combined with a post as Distinguished Professor of Linguistics at the University of California, Santa Barbara, where he returned full-time from 1 June 2015. He has also taught at the University of Southern California and the University of California, Los Angeles.

=== Honours ===
Comrie was elected a Fellow of the British Academy (FBA), the United Kingdom's national academy for the humanities and social sciences. He became a foreign member of the Royal Netherlands Academy of Arts and Sciences in 2000. In September 2017, he was awarded the Neil and Saras Smith Medal for Linguistics by the British Academy.

== Selected works ==
=== Books ===
- The World's Major Languages (ed.), 1987, New York: Oxford University Press, ISBN 0-19-520521-9. Second edition: 2009, Routledge ISBN 978-0-415-35339-7.
- Tense, 1985, Cambridge University Press. ISBN 9781139165815.
- The Languages of the Soviet Union, 1981, Cambridge University Press (Cambridge Language Surveys), ISBN 0-521-23230-9 (hard covers) and ISBN 0-521-29877-6 (paperback)
- Language Universals and Linguistic Typology: Syntax and Morphology, 1981, The University of Chicago Press.
- Aspect: An Introduction to the Study of Verbal Aspect and Related Problems, 1976, Cambridge University Press.

=== Articles ===
- Comrie, Bernard. 1975. Causatives and universal grammar. Transactions of the Philological Society 1974. 1–32.
- Comrie, Bernard. 1976. The syntax of causative constructions: Cross-language similarities and divergences. In Shibatani, Masayoshi (ed.), Syntax and Semantics 6: The Grammar of Causative Constructions, 261–312. New York: Academic Press.
- Comrie, Bernard. 1978. Ergativity. In Lehmann, Winfred P. (ed.), Syntactic typology: Studies in the phenomenology of language, 329–394. Austin: University of Texas Press.
- Comrie, Bernard. 1986. Markedness, grammar, people, and the world. In Eckman, Fred R. & Moravcsik, Edith A. & Wirth, Jessica R. (eds.), Markedness, 85–106. New York: Plenum.
- Comrie, Bernard. 1999. Reference-tracking: Description and explanation. Sprachtypologie und Universalienforschung 52(3–4). 335–346.
- Comrie, Bernard. 2005. Alignment of case marking. In Haspelmath, Martin & Dryer, Matthew S. & Gil, David & Comrie, Bernard (eds.), The world atlas of language structures, 398–405. Oxford: Oxford University Press. ((http://wals.info/chapter/98))
- Keenan, Edward L. & Comrie, Bernard. 1977. Noun phrase accessibility and universal grammar. Linguistic Inquiry 8. 63–99.
