= Lydia Morris =

Lydia Morris FBA FAcSS
- Born: 1949 (age 76–77); Salford, Lancashire, England

Academic background
- Education: University of Keele; London School of Economics
- Thesis: Status and Poverty in El Bajo: the Social Organisation of a Puerto Rican Coastal Community (1979)

Academic work
- Discipline: Sociology
- Sub-discipline: Human rights; welfare rights; political sociology; empirical analysis
- Institutions: Swansea University; Lambeth Council; University of Durham; University of Essex

Lydia Dorothy Morris, FBA, FAcSS (born 1949) is a British retired sociologist and academic, specialising in the conceptualisation and empirical analysis of human rights. She was Professor of Sociology at the University of Essex from 1995 to 2025. She was awarded the British Academy's Peter Townsend Prize in 2023.

== Early life and education ==
Morris was born in 1949 in Salford, Lancashire, England. She was educated at Pendleton High School for Girls, a grammar school in Pendleton. She studied politics and sociology at the University of Keele, graduating with a Bachelor of Arts (BA) degree. She then studied anthropology at the London School of Economics and completed a Doctor of Philosophy (PhD) degree. Her doctoral thesis was titled "Status and Poverty in El Bajo: the Social Organisation of a Puerto Rican Coastal Community", and was submitted in 1979.

== Academic career ==
Morris worked at Swansea University (1981–1983) and Lambeth Council (1983–1984), before becoming a lecturer at the University of Durham in 1984. In 1990, she moved to the University of Essex where she spent the rest of her career. She was appointed Professor of Sociology in 1995. She retired in 2025, and was made Professor Emerita.

In 2013, she was elected an Academician of the Academy of Social Sciences (AcSS), later renamed Fellow of the Academy of Social Sciences (FAcSS). In 2023, she won the British Academy's Peter Townsend Prize for The Moral Economy of Welfare and Migration. In 2024, she was elected Fellow of the British Academy (FBA), the United Kingdom's national academy for the humanities and the social sciences.

== Selected works ==
- Morris, Lydia (1990). The workings of the household: a US-UK comparison. Cambridge: Polity Press. ISBN 978-0745604411.
- Morris, Lydia (1994). Dangerous classes: the underclass and social citizenship. London; New York: Routledge. ISBN 9780415050135.
- Morris, Lydia (1995). Social divisions: economic decline and social structural change. Cambridge Studies in Work & Social Inequality. Vol. 2. London: UCL Press. ISBN 978-1857282016.
- Morris, Lydia (2002). "Review of The Dignity of Working Men: Morality and the Boundaries of Race, Class and Immigration". The Canadian Journal of Sociology / Cahiers canadiens de sociologie. 27 (1). Canadian Journal of Sociology: 119–120. doi:10.2307/3341421. ISSN 0318-6431. JSTOR 3341421.
- Morris, Lydia (2002). Managing migration: civic stratification and migrants' rights. London; New York: Routledge. ISBN 041516706X.
- Morris, Lydia (March 2003). "Managing Contradiction: Civic Stratification and Migrants' Rights". International Migration Review. 37 (1): 74–100. doi:10.1111/j.1747-7379.2003.tb00130.x.
- Morris, Lydia, ed. (2006). Rights: Sociological Perspectives. Taylor & Francis Group. ISBN 9781134255337.
- Morris, Lydia (2010). Asylum, welfare and the cosmopolitan ideal: a sociology of rights. Oxford; New York: Routledge. ISBN 9781136996481.
- Morris, Lydia (2021). The moral economy of welfare and migration: reconfiguring rights in austerity Britain. Montreal; Kingston; London; Chicago: McGill-Queen's University Press. ISBN 978-0228006626.
- Morris, Lydia (2025). Citizen rights, migrant rights and civic stratification. Abingdon, Oxon; New York, NY: Routledge. ISBN 9781032349831.
