= Landscape archaeology =

Sub-discipline of archaeology and archaeological theory

Landscape archaeology, previously known as total archaeology, is a sub-discipline of archaeology and archaeological theory. It studies the ways in which people in the past constructed and used the environment around them. It is also known as archaeogeography (from the Greek ἀρχαίος "ancient", and γεωγραφία "earth study"). Landscape archaeology is inherently multidisciplinary in its approach to the study of culture, and is used by pre-historical, classic, and historic archaeologists. The key feature that distinguishes landscape archaeology from other archaeological approaches to sites is that there is an explicit emphasis on the sites' relationships between material culture, human alteration of land/cultural modifications to landscape, and the natural environment. The study of landscape archaeology (also sometimes referred to as the archaeology of the cultural landscape) has evolved to include how landscapes were used to create and reinforce social inequality and to announce one's social status to the community at large. The field includes with the dynamics of geohistorical objects, such as roads, walls, boundaries, trees, and land divisions.

== Introduction ==
Landscape generally refers to both natural environments and environments constructed by human beings. Natural landscapes are considered to be environments that have not been altered by humans in any shape or form. Cultural landscapes, on the other hand, are environments that have been altered in some manner by people (including temporary structures and places, such as campsites, that are created by human beings). Among archaeologists, the term landscape can refer to the meanings and alterations people mark onto their surroundings. As such, landscape archaeology is often employed to study the human use of land over extensive periods of time.

Landscape archaeology can be summed up by Nicole Branton's statement:

"the landscapes in landscape archaeology may be as small as a single household or garden or as large as an empire", and "although resource exploitation, class, and power are frequent topics of landscape archaeology, landscape approaches are concerned with spatial, not necessarily ecological or economic, relationships. While similar to settlement archaeology and ecological archaeology, landscape approaches model places and space as dynamic participants in past behavior, not merely setting (affecting human action), or artifact (affected by human action)".

The term space has commonly been used in place of cultural landscape to describe landscapes that are "produced or mediated by human behavior to elicit certain behaviors". Defined in this manner, archaeologists, such as Delle, have theorized space as composed of three components: the material, social, and cognitive. Material space is any space that is created by people either through physical means or through the establishment of definitions, descriptions and rules of what a space is reserved for and how it should be used (Delle 1998:38). Social space is what dictates a person's relationship with both others and the material space (Delle 1998:39). Social space is how one uses their material space to interact with others and navigate throughout their world. Cognitive space is how people comprehend their social and material spaces—it is how people understand the world around them and identify appropriate ways of conducting themselves in the many different environments they may occupy (Delle 1998:38-9). Alternatively, the terms constructed, conceptualized, and ideational have been used to describe: the constructed ways in which people engage with their environments, meanings and interactions people place onto specific landscapes, and imagined and emotional perspectives individuals place with their landscapes.

== Analysis of landscapes ==
Many methods used to analyze archaeological sites are relevant to the analysis of landscapes. The archaeology of landscapes incorporates multiple research methods into its analysis in order to ensure that multiple sources of information are gathered; allowing for a sound interpretation of the site in question. These methods include pollen analysis, Geographic Information Systems, soil sampling, faunal analysis, ground penetrating radar, archival data (including maps and census data), and of course archaeological excavation methods. Pollen, soil, faunal, and floral analysis allows the archaeologist to understand the natural vegetation of an area, vegetation that was actively grown by area settlers, and the animal life that also lived in the area. An understanding of the plant and animal life specific to an area can lead to, for example, an analysis of the types of food available to members of the community, an understanding of the actual diet typical for a subset of a population, and site and skeletal dating. If landscape reconstruction and preservation, in particular, is a goal of an archaeological research project, pollen and soil analysis can aide in landscape archaeology to accurately interpret and reconstruct landscapes of the past (Schoenwetter pg 278).

Advances in survey technology have permitted the rapid and accurate analysis of wide areas, making the process an efficient way of learning more about the historic environment. Global Positioning System, remote sensing, archaeological geophysics, Total stations and digital photography, as well as GIS, have helped reduce the time and cost involved in such work.

- Geographic Information Systems

Geographic Information Systems, commonly referred to as GIS, provides a way in which archaeologists can visually represent archaeological data, and can be done in two ways: data visualization and representative visualization. For example, researchers can create planar maps from orthophotos, then add multiple layers of historical data (such as changing topology or the locations of artificial structures) on the same map, allowing them to better see the duration and durability of past and present forms within a landscape.

Viewshed Analysis has aided in the archaeologist's ability to study behavioral relationships between humans, their landscape, and material culture, in order to study migration, settlement patterns, and agency. Viewshed analysis also provides means with which archaeologists can recreate through an ability to recreate the line of sights possible from one point on a landscape and to situate a person within a defined landscape.

- Ground Penetrating Radar
- Global Positioning System
- Remote Sensing
- Archaeological Geophysics
- Total Station
- Excavation

Site excavation has the potential to uncover building methods, such as the findings of postholes (which can mark the previous existence of fence lines or other site boundaries), timber, stones, and/or brick that marks the existence of man-made structures.

Archaeological features often leave earthworks – signs of some type of modification to the natural environment that often appear as cropmarks, soil marks, or even as plough marks in fields that, if historical, can indicate cultivation methods of the past, or, particularly if more recent, can lift archaeological material to the surface and, therefore, ruin the stratigraphic layering of materials from youngest to oldest). Features can be discovered by archaeologists both through excavation and through field survey.

- Archival Data is used by any archaeologists that have any written texts available to them, and is used in a multiple number of ways, depending on the research project and objective of the research and the data available in the archives. Archives are often employed to confirm archaeological findings, to understand the construction of a site, settlement patterns,.
- Pollen Analysis

Pollen analysis has allowed archaeologists to analyze vegetation selectively cultivated by area residents, the "native vegetation" of a particular area, and allow archaeologists to map out land use over time (which can be ascertained from weeds). But collecting a suitable sample is not all that easy. Failure to collect a suitable sample can be due in part to not sampling from areas where suitable pollen samples can be gathered (e.g. lakes and bogs, sites that were sufficiently exposed to air-borne pollen, sites that had both a long exposure to air and are deeply buried into the ground), or because pollen is vulnerable to destruction by the oxidation process or soil microbes such as bacteria and fungi, it negatively impacts an archaeologist's ability to collect a suitable pollen sample.

Gerald K. Kelso and Mary C. Beaudry demonstrate how "…changes in the complex mosaic of microenvironments in metropolitan situations are sensitively recorded in the pollen contributions of weedy taxa". Arboreal pollen indicates regional vegetation, while non-arboreal indicates local vegetation. Both arboreal and non-arboreal pollen can be gathered and used in archaeological studies to support documentary and archaeological evidence of changes in land use—initial settlement, resettlement of area by other groups, and decline and abandonment of area—for example non-arboreal pollen can indicate the replacement of vegetation native to a region within the United States by vegetation native to places in Europe, or to the clearance of large areas that would be expected to make way for cities and towns.

- Soil Sampling
- Faunal Analysis
- Bioarchaeology
- Floral Analysis

== Sociological aspects of landscape archaeology ==
Within the discipline of historical archaeology, specifically within the United States, landscape archaeology initially gained prominence with efforts to preserve the homes and gardens of prominent North American figures (see George Washington's Mount Vernon and Thomas Jefferson's Monticello), the reconstruction of early colonial settlements (see Colonial Williamsburg) and the analysis of gardens (see Annapolis). Archaeologists studying the aforementioned, and other colonial sites throughout the United States, have excavated the gardens of wealthy men and women in order to reconstruct and ascertain the function of these gardens in colonial life. Scholars analyzing the colonial gardens have noticed that gardens were designed in a neat and orderly fashion, displaying symmetry and inspired by Baroque and Renaissance styles (this style is often described as indicative of a "Georgian Worldview" that became popular during the 17th and 18th centuries). Many interpretations have been advanced to explain the function of these gardens. Beginning in the mid-1700s, wealthy elites began to construct large, stately homes and neat, ordered gardens with the guise of mapping superiority and exclusive knowledge onto the landscape. Although the Baroque and Renaissance styles were out of date by the time elites in the United States employed them, this was intentionally done to communicate a knowledge and appreciation of British history that few within the community would have access to. Archaeologists have concluded that the symmetrical, geometric, designs of garden-scapes adopted by colonists in the mid eighteenth to nineteenth centuries made use of "...converging and diverging lines of sight to manipulate the relationship between distance and focal point", making objects appear larger or further away than they really were. These optical illusions functioned to transform the home into a readily identifiable status symbol, and to mark the owners and occupants of these homes as socially distinct from others within the colonial community. Stately homes and gardens constructed by the colonial elite also served to assert authority and to naturalize a social hierarchy onto the colonial landscape. Such analysis and interpretations are neo-marxist in its approach to the understanding and interpreting landscapes of the past.

Stephen A. Mrozwoski has extended the conclusions drawn from the archaeological analysis of elite homes and pleasure gardens into the analysis of the developing middle and working class landscapes and ideologies among industrial communities, noting "in the urban context economies of scale realized through spatial practice also contributed to a social landscape that between the eighteenth and early twentieth centuries was increasingly constructed along class lines" and demonstrate the ways in which the elite constructed their industrial landscapes that worked to restrict perceived amoral behaviors (e.g. drinking, smoking) and to maintain an orderly landscape. The landscape also provided an area where "values like orderliness, gentility, and abstinence were important elements of a middle-class culture that, while subject to variability, was nevertheless part of daily existence."

Historical archaeologists have incorporated Foucauldian theories into the understanding of plantation landscapes. On plantation sites throughout the Americas, plantation owners utilized surveillance methods to restrict the behaviors of the enslaved populations. James A. Delle notes that surveillance was often incorporated into the plantation landscape, noting "the planter class who designed the estate landscapes actively constructed plantation spaces…as an active part of their strategy of social control" and power. This was largely done through architectural techniques such as incorporating positions where panoptic views can be achieved into the construction of planters and/or overseers homes or by constructing slave villages that were in the plain view or line of sight of the homes of the overseer and/or plantation owner.

Archaeologists have pointed out that, although home spaces are generally considered to have become increasingly gendered, it is erroneous to assume that only women occupied the private (home) sphere and men the public. For more extensive information on this topic, see Household Archaeology.

Barbara Voss has undertaken extensive archaeological work to reveal how ideas about gender, sexuality, marriage, and ethnic/racial intermarriage were mapped onto the landscape of Spanish Colonial mission sites in California (El Presidio de San Francisco). Voss' interpretations reveal the lived trauma that is often concealed by popular, romanticized, narratives of relationships established through colonial contact between indigenous peoples and Spanish colonizers The mission landscape became physical and conceptualized space where two genders (male/female) and heterosexuality were to be explicitly expressed and reinforced.

Landscape Archaeology has been useful in the analysis of cultural identities that developed among social and racial groups. It has been argued that the existence and continued use of yard spaces among Black Americans (along with other African-derived practices observed in the Americas) is proof of a distinct, new world, cultural identity. One feature that appears to be widespread throughout the African diaspora is the significant importance of yard spaces in the everyday lives of African-Americans. Sidney W. Mintz, in describing the "house-and-yard pattern" among African-American peasants residing in the Caribbean, explains "…the house, particularly among poorer peasants, is not important in itself as a material representation (i.e. material culture/artifacts) of the domestic group or family". Mintz further states that while the house "…is usually used mainly for sleeping and for storing clothing and other articles of personal value" the yard is where "…children play, the washing is done, the family relaxes, and friends are entertained".

Richard Westmacott, Barbara J. Heath and Amber Bennett have echoed Mintz's statements about the use of yards among African-Americans in their accounts of present day and past African-American communities. Richard Westmacott provides an extensive ethnographic account of the role gardens and yards play in the lives of African Americans in the southern region of the United States in his book African-American Gardens and Yards in the Rural South. Westmacott provides a clear definition of the yard, defining it as a place where leisure activities and artistic expression often take place Similarly, Heath and Bennett describe the yard as a space in which "…food production and preparation, care and maintenance of animals, domestic chores, storage, recreation, and aesthetic enjoyment" often occur at. The use of the yard as an important and integral aspect of a home appears to be an element that many west African cultures hold, which indicates that the function of the yard within African-American households may be a facet of west African cultures that was maintained in the New World, as well as a cultural aspect that aided in the development of African American identities in the Americas.

Similarly, Mrozowski's study of rear yards associated with the Boott Mill boardinghouses and tenements that housed workers revealed that these yards mainly served practical functions and were not primarily used to grow foodstuffs, and may not have served an integral part in the daily lives of the low-wage workers hired (99–100). Mrozowski also argues that yards also represented social distance and distinctiveness between socio-economic classes of people, due to the particular placement, use, and overall function. "The result was a landscape that created social distance between the agents and the workers who lived only a few feet away. It also represents a significant transformation in the urban space. The ornamental yards of the agent's house and overseers' block signal an important shift in the type of urban space being produced and the manner in which it was utilized."

== History of the field ==
Landscape archaeology has its origins in "total archaeology", a term used by Christopher Taylor in 1974 to describe an approach which incorporated wider disciplines, such as folklore, historical map analysis and geology, alongside excavation in the understanding of archaeological sites. In his excavations of the Neolithic enclosure at Great Wilbraham, David Clarke defined "total archaeology" as the incorporation of a full range of interdisciplinary specialists and the incorporation of scientific methods, such as magnetometry and pollen analysis, in the reconstruction of a site. Total archaeology aimed to understand sites in their contexts, studying landscapes as a whole and incorporating methods traditionally used by historians, geographers, geologists and anthropologists. The term "landscape archaeology" was first used in a book title, as a replacement for "total archaeology", in 1974, by Mick Aston and Trevor Rowley.

The spatial archaeology trend was launched by Ian Hodder in 1976. It is an archaeological trend, such as ethnoarchaeology, cognitive archaeology and other archaeological approaches. Spatial archaeology was defined by Clarke in 1977. He pointed out three analysis levels: macro, micro and semi-micro (Clarke 1977: 11–15). This trend analyses the interaction between nature and culture.

Human geography uses location analysis to define models for the understanding of the territorial organisation. The archaeologists Higgs and Vita-Finzi began to apply site catchment analysis (SCA) in 1970s. They proposed a new approach to know how people settled in prehistoric societies. They analysed economic resources with tools taken from human geography, these resources were 5–10 km from the archaeological sites. Some years later, in the 1970s, spatial archaeology was created, based on the use of several tools taken from 1960s English human geography that was focus on the study of location interdependence. Some archaeologists use these geographical techniques (Hodder & Orton 1976; Hodder 1977, 1978; Clarke 1977). But these techniques were only used in isolated contexts. They did not fully constitute an archaeological method and lacked a theoretical basis.

In the 1980s some archaeologists began to criticize the classical view of site catchment analysis (De Carlos 1988). The reason was related to the lack of a general method to study archaeological territory. In 1989, Javier de Carlos said that archaeology was only able to apply geographical techniques without being able to use a procedure integrated in a method.

== Centers of research ==
Archaeogeography is taught in France and Portugal. A Masters degree in Archaeology and Environment is given by the University of Paris I. Archaeogeography is also included in the University of Coimbra's curricula of Centro de Estudos de Arqueologia, Artes e Ciências do Património.

== See also ==
- Archaeological theory – Intellectual frameworks for interpreting archaeological data
- Culture-historical archaeology – Theoretical paradigm in archaeology
- Cultural landscape – Landscape, which is permanently embossed by humans
- Landscape – Visible features of a land area
- Landscape Architecture – Design of outdoor public areas, landmarks, and structures
- Landscape history – Study of changes in the physical environment caused by human activities
- Settlement archaeology – Branch of archaeology

== Sources ==
- Bjørnar, Olsen; Shanks, Michael; Webmoor, Timothy and Witmore, Christopher. Archaeology: the Discipline of Things. London: University of California Press, 2012.
- Chouquer, Gérard (dir.), Les formes du paysage, tomes 1, 2 et 3 - Études sur les parcellaires, Errance, Paris, 1996–1997.
- Chouquer, Gérard L'étude des paysages. Essai sur leurs formes et leur histoire, Errance, Paris, 2000.
- Chouquer, Gérard et Favory, FrançoisL'arpentage romain, Histoire des textes, Droit, Techniques, Errance, Paris, 2001.
- Chouquer, Gérard «Crise et recomposition des objets : les enjeux de l'archéogéographie», Études Rurales, juillet-décembre 2003, n°167-168, p. 13–31.
- Chouquer, Gérard Quels scénarios pour l'histoire du paysage ? Orientations de recherche pour l’archéogéographie, préface de Bruno Latour, Coimbra-Porto, 2007, 408 p.
- Chouquer, Gérard Traité d'archéogéographie. La crise des récits géohistoriques, Errance, Paris, 2008, 200 p.
- Chouquer, Gérard 2008b. Les transformations récentes de la centuriation. Une autre lecture de l'arpentage romain. Les Annales. Histoire, Sciences Sociales 4: 858–874.
- Chouquer, Gérard La terre dans le monde romain : anthropologie, droit, géographie, Actes Sud, Arles, 2010, 352 p.
- Chouquer, Gérard et Watteaux, Magali, "L’archéologie des disciplines géohistoriques", Errance, Paris, 2013.
- de Carlos, Javier, Una aproximación territorial fenómeno megalítico: La Rioja Alavesa y Cuartango. Munibe. Suplemento, nº 6, 1988, p. 113–127.
- de Carlos, Javier, Desde la ortodoxia espacial hasta el albor del método arqueogeográfico: aplicación crítica del Site Catchment Analysis a los dólmenes de La Rioja Alavesa y el valle de Cuartango. Boletín del Seminario de Estudios de Arte y Arqueología: BSAA, vol 55, 1989, p. 15–40.
- de Carlos, Javier,, La Arqueogeografía. Un procedimiento para el estudio del espacio prehistórico Madrid, Universidad Complutense, 1991.
- Études Rurales n°167-168, dossier sous dir. G. Chouquer "Objets en crise, objets recomposés", juillet-décembre 2003
- Études Rurales n°175-176, dossier sous dir. G. Chouquer "Nouveaux chapitres d'histoire du paysage", juillet-décembre 2005.
- Harman, German "On Behalf of Form." In Elements of Architecture: Assembling Archaeology, Atmosphere and the Performance of Building Spaces, edited by Mikkel Bille and Tim Flohr Sørensen, 30–46. The View From Archaeology and Architecture. Routledge, 2016.
- Lavigne, Cédric. Essai sur la planification agraire au Moyen Âge. Les paysages neufs de la Gascogne médiévale (XIIIe-XIVe siècles), Ausonius-Publications, Bordeaux, 2002.
- Olivier, Laurent, The Dark Abyss of Time. Altamira Press, 2011.
- Les nouvelles de l'archéologie n°125, dossier sous dir. M. Watteaux, "L'archéogéographie. Un état des lieux et de leurs dynamiques", octobre 2011.
- Les nouvelles de l'archéologie n°115, dossier sous dir. S. Robert et N. Verdier "Du sentier à la route. Une archéologie des réseaux viaires", mars 2009.
- Robert, Sandrine et Costa, Laurent Guide de lecture des cartes anciennes, Errance, Paris, 2008.
- Robert, Sandrine, Sources et techniques de l'archéogéographie, Presses universitaires de Franche-Comté, Besançon, 2011.
- Robert, Sandrine, « Une vision renouvelée de la dynamique forme-société entre archéologie et géographie », L’Espace géographique 2012/4 (Vol. 41), p. 310–323. (Available in English translation at: https://www.cairn-int.info/article-E_EG_414_0310--revisiting-the-dynamics-linking-society.htm)
- Watteaux, Magali. "The Road Network in the Longue Durée: a Reading Key of the History of Territories." Open Archaeology 3: 149–174, 2017 a.
- Watteaux, Magali. "What Do the Forms of the Landscapes Tell Us?." In Clashes of Time: the Contemporary Past as a Challenge for Archaeology, edited by Jean-Marie Blaising, Jan Driessen, Jean-Pierre Legendre, and Laurent Olivier, 195–220. Louvain-la-Neuve, Belgium: UCL Presses universitaires de Louvain, 2017b.
