= Stephen Rippon =

Academic background
- Education: University of Reading

Academic work
- Institutions: University of Reading; University of Exeter

Stephen Rippon is a landscape historian who holds the chair in Landscape Archaeology at the University of Exeter. He has published widely on the landscapes of Roman and medieval Britain.

== Early life ==
Rippon was born and brought up in Essex.

== Academic career ==
Rippon completed his BA in Archaeology and his PhD studying wetland reclamation around the River Severn at the University of Reading, where he became a Research Fellow. He then received a British Academy Postdoctoral Fellowship. He subsequently took a post as a lecturer in Archaeology at the University of Exeter where he is currently Professor of Landscape Archaeology.

== Awards and Honours ==
Rippon was elected a Fellow of the Society of Antiquaries of London in 1999. In 2025 he was awarded the British Academy Landscape Archaeology medal.

== Media Appearances ==
Rippon appeared in Roman Britain from the Air on ITV (23 December 2014). He has also been quoted on the BBC News web site - for example on the discovery of a Roman fort underneath Exeter bus station. He also appears in several YouTube videos - for example talking about a Exeter, a Place in Time.

== Selected Publications ==
=== Books ===
- The Transformation of Coastal Wetlands Exploitation and management of marshland landscapes in North West Europe during the Roman and medieval periods. Oxford University Press for the British Academy. 2000. ISBN 978-0197262290.
- Historic Landscape Analysis: Deciphering the Countryside. Council for British Archaeology. 2012. ISBN 978-1902771441.
- Territoriality and the Early Medieval Landscape: The Countryside of the East Saxon Kingdom. Boydell Press. 2022. ISBN 978-1783276806.

=== Journals ===
- "Early Planned Landscapes in South-East Essex". Essex Archaeology and History. 22. 1991.
- "'Uncommonly rich and fertile' or 'not very salubrious'? The Perception and Value of Wetland Landscapes". Landscapes. 10. 2009.
