= Cecil Grayson =

Cecil Grayson, CBE, FBA (5 February 1920 – 29 April 1998) was an English Italian studies scholar. He was the Serena Professor of Italian Studies at the University of Oxford from 1958 to 1987.

== Life ==
=== Career ===
Born on 5 February 1920, Grayson came from a working-class family; his father, a boilermaker, died following an accident when Grayson was six years old, and his mother used her income as a seamstress to pay for his and his brother Denis's education. He attended Batley Grammar School and St Edmund Hall, Oxford; he served in the Army in the Second World War, rising to the rank of Major. Graduating in modern languages in 1947, he was appointed a university lecturer in Italian at the University of Oxford the following year, and also held lectureships at St Edmund Hall and New College, Oxford. From 1958 to 1987, he was the Serena Professor of Italian Studies at Oxford and a fellow of Magdalen College, Oxford. He also held visiting professorships or fellowships at foreign universities, including Yale University, the University of California at Berkeley, UCLA, New York University, the University of Cape Town and the University of Western Australia. He served as president of the Modern Humanities Research Association in 1987.

=== Research ===
With Carlo Dionisotti, Grayson edited Early Italian Texts (1949) and, alone, he edited Leon Alberti's Opuscoli Inediti: Musca, Vita S. Potiti (1954). He edited Alberti's Opera Volgari (3 vols., 1960, 1966 and 1973), La Prima Grammatica della Lingua Volgare (1964), On Painting and Sculpture: The Latin Texts of De Pictura and De Statua (1972), De Pictura (1980) and On Painting (1988). His writings on Alberti were brought together in Studi su Leon Battista Alberti (1998). He translated Roberto Ridolfi's The Life of Girolamo Savonarola (1959), The Life of Niccolo Machiavelli (1963) and The Life of Francesco Guicciardini (1967). In 1964 his translation of Francesco Guicciardini's History of Italy and History of Florence was printed; he edited Guicciardini's Selected Writings as translated by Margaret Grayson (1965). Alongside other articles and reviews, Grayson produced an edition of Vincenzo Calmeta's Prose e Lettere (1959), compiled Cinque Saggi su Dante (1972), and edited The World of Dante (1981) and The Renaissance: Essays in Interpretation (1982, co-edited with André Chastel, Denys Hay and others). He received the International Galileo Prize in 1974, was elected a fellow of the British Academy in 1979, and was appointed a CBE in 1992; he was the subject of two Festschrifts: The Languages of Literature in Renaissance Italy (1987) and Dante and Governance (1997). Grayson died on 29 April 1998.
