= Matt Golder =

American political scientist

Matt Golder is an American political scientist. He is professor and director of undergraduate studies in the department of political science at Pennsylvania State University. Golder is the editor of two works of comparative political science, Principles of Comparative Politics and Foundations in Comparative Politics.

Golder attended St. Edmund Hall, Oxford, receiving a BA in philosophy, politics and economics and an M.Phil. in European politics and society. He went on to further study at New York University, graduating with an M.A. in French Studies in 1999 and receiving his Ph.D. from the Department of Politics in 2004. He had also taught at Florida State University, the University of Iowa, the University of Essex and did research at University of Mannheim, Germany (2012).

Golder's research focuses on political representation and electoral performance.

== Publications ==
- William Roberts Clark, Matt Golder, Sona Nadenichek Golder (2018): Foundations of Comparative Politics. Saga Publications
