= Evelyn Martinengo-Cesaresco =

English-Italian historian and folklorist (1852–1931)

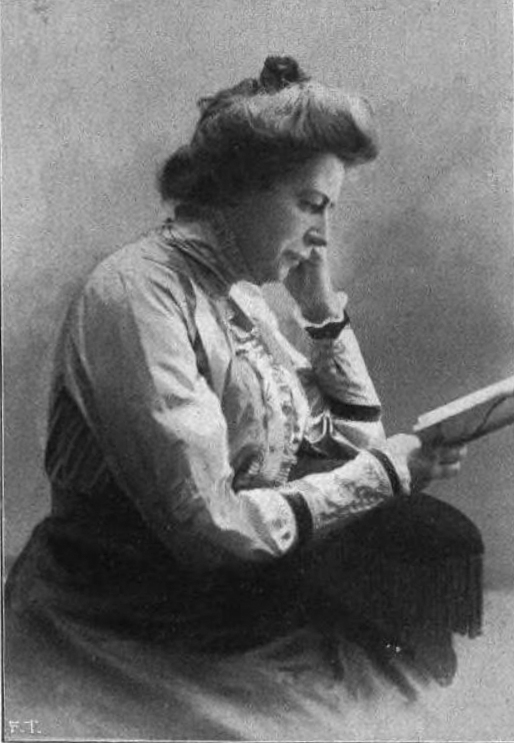
Contessa Martinengo-Cesaresco in 1914

Evelyn Lillian Haseldine Carrington, Countess Martinengo-Cesaresco (1852–1931) was an English-Italian historian and folklorist.

She was the daughter of the Very Reverend Henry Carrington, Dean of Bocking, who was the son of Sir Codrington Edmund Carrington, first Chief Justice of Ceylon and Paulina Belli, Lady Carrington, who belonged to a noble Italian family from Viterbo. Her mother, Juanita Lyall, was a novelist. Never formally educated, Evelyn began writing children's stories in the 1870s, followed by a series of biographies of Italians, having become interested in contemporary Italian events.

In 1882, she married Count Eugenio Martinengo-Cesaresco in Rome, a member of a Lombard noble family who had fled to Piedmont in 1849–59 after an unsuccessful uprising against the Austrian occupation of Brescia. The couple lived in the Palazzo Martinengo near Lake Garda.

The Countess Martinengo-Cesaresco wrote books on Italian history, especially on the Italian Unification, and on folklore. Working from already published sources, she regularly contributed articles to Folklore and wrote books including Essays in the Study of Folk-Songs.

In 1931, she was awarded the Serena Medal of the British Academy for her contributions to Italian history.
