= Richard Pearson (cricketer) =

English cricketer

Richard Michael Pearson (born 27 January 1972) is a former English cricketer who represented England in two Youth Test matches in 1991, and went on to play first-class county cricket in England between 1992 and 1997 for Northamptonshire, Essex and Surrey. A right-arm off-break spin bowler, Pearson's career featured 98 matches across the one and four-day formats of the game, where he captured 137 wickets.

Pearson, born in Batley, Yorkshire, attended Cambridge University and represented them for three matches in May and June 1991, including one match against a touring West Indies side. His ability earned him a place with England Young Cricketers for the second and third Youth Tests against a touring Youth Australia side at Chelmsford and Old Trafford cricket grounds. His performance brought him two match appearances during a one-season stint at Northamptonshire prior to moving to Essex for the 1994 and 1995 seasons. He played 22 times for Essex before moving to Surrey at the end of 1995, where he would play more regularly – with 38 games – until the end of his career in 1997.
