= Giovanni Aquilecchia =

Giovanni Aquilecchia, (known as Gianni) (28 November 1923 in Nettuno, Italy – 3 August 2001 in Camden, London, heart failure) was a Professor of Italian at Bedford College, London, and the merged college with Royal Holloway, University of London. He was one of the great Italian Renaissance scholars of the second half of the 20th century.

== Early life ==
He was the son of Vincenzo Aquilecchia, an officer in the Italian army, and his wife, Maria Letizia, née Filibeck.

He was first educated in Turin and then at the liceum Torquato Tasso, Rome. At nineteen, he entered the Faculty of Letters at the University of Rome and graduated with first-class honours in 1946.

== Career ==
From 1946 to 1949, he was a teaching assistant at the University of Rome whilst studying for a higher degree. In 1950, he became a scholar at the Warburg Institute, London. In 1951, he became an assistant in the Department of Italian Studies at the University of Manchester. In 1953, he became an assistant lecturer in Italian at University College London becoming Reader there from 1959 to 1961. He then returned to Manchester as Serena Professor of Italian Language and Literature till 1970. He was then appointed Professor of Italian at Bedford College 1970-85 and remained as Emeritus Professor when Bedford joined with Royal Holloway. He was unhappy with the merger and continued giving his classes in central London, until he retired in 1989.

His research was centred on Giordano Bruno and from 1996, Gianni Aquilecchia was the president of the Centro Internazionale di Studi Bruniani in Naples.

In 1996 the British Academy awarded him the Serena Medal for services towards the furtherance of the study of Italian history, literature, art or economics.

He was appointed professor emeritus and then honorary professor of Italian at University College London in 1998.

== Personal life ==
In 1951, in London, he married Costantina Maria Bacchetta (born c. 1929), a student. They had two sons and a daughter. The marriage was dissolved in 1973. In 1992, he married Catherine Posford.
