= Yulia Kovas =

Geneticist and psychologist

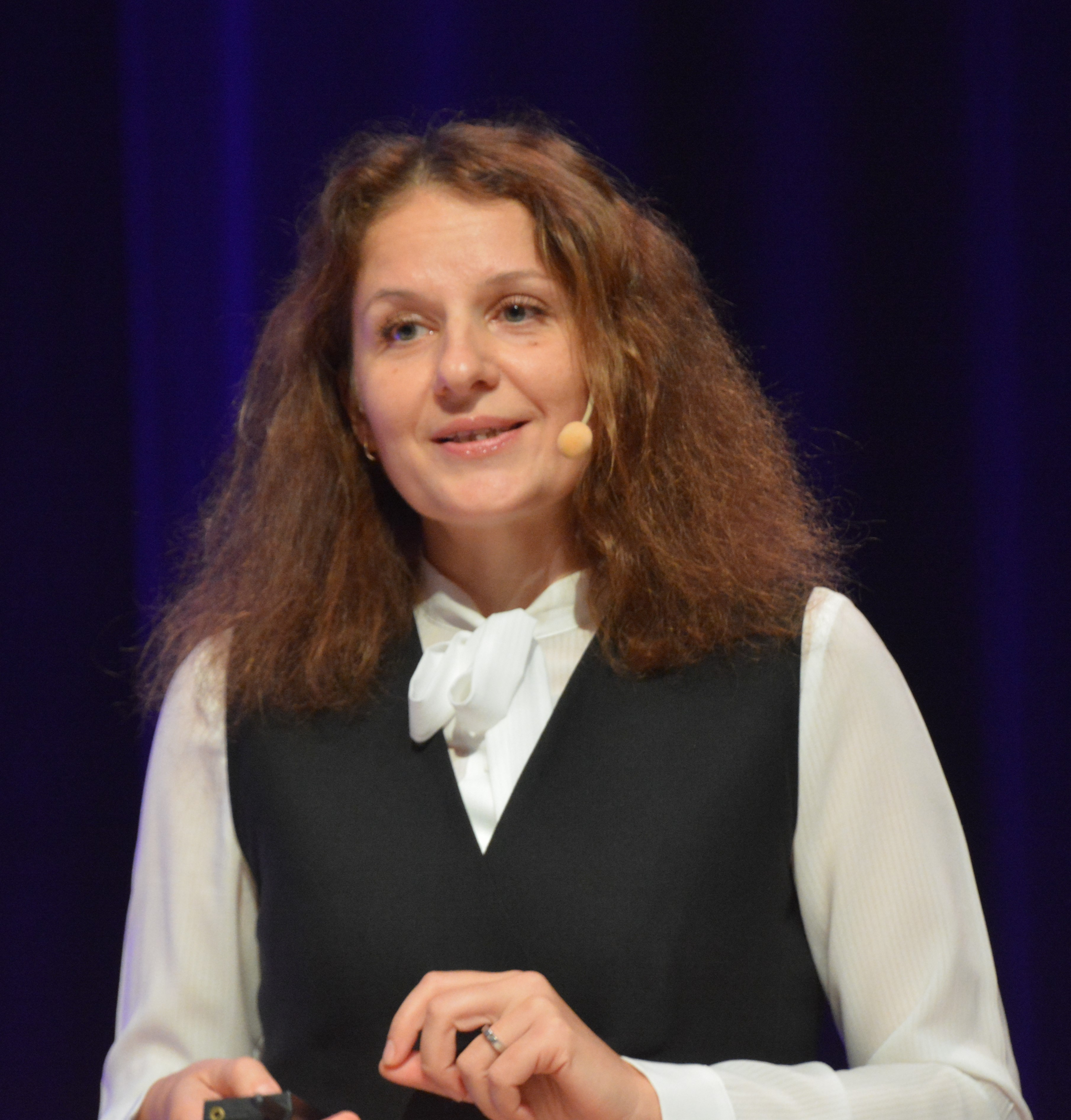
Yulia Kovas at the symposium Brain and Culture at Karolinska Institutet in Sweden, in October 2019

Yulia Kovas (born March 12, 1973) is a Russian-British geneticist and psychologist. She is a research professor at Hult International Business School, a visiting professor at King's College London. She is emeritus Professor at Goldsmiths, University of London, where for over 18 years her roles included Chair of Psychology Ethics Committee, Director of a research lab (InLab) and Director for Research for Psychology. She is a visiting professor at New York University, and other universities in the United Kingdom, as well as research lead and scientific adviser to many international research projects and labs. She holds many academic appointments, including Chair of the Scientific Advisory Board of Max Planck Institute for Empirical Aesthetics.

Kovas received the British Academy Wiley Prize in Psychology in 2012. Kovas is the director of the International Laboratory for Interdisciplinary Investigations into Individual Differences, and collaborates on research into aetiology of individual differences as part of the Twins Early Development Study at King's College, London <https://www.teds.ac.uk/>.

Kovas received her Ph.D. in 2007 from the SGDP Centre, Institute of Psychiatry, King's College London. Her thesis on generalist genes and mathematics explored the origins of the individual differences in school mathematics. She received a degree in literature and linguistics as well as teaching qualifications from the State Pedagogical University of St Petersburg, Russia in 1996 and taught children of all ages for 6 years. She received a B.Sc. in psychology from Birkbeck College, University of London in 2003 and an MSc in Social, Genetic, and Developmental Psychiatry from the SGDP Centre, King's College.

Kovas' InLab, conducts international, interdisciplinary research into individual differences in cognition, motivation, achievement and other educationally relevant traits.

== Awards and grants ==
Kovas has received external grant funding from NIH; MRC; British Academy, Royal Society, Beijing Normal University; Russian Federal Grants; Erasmus+ mobility. In 2011, she was awarded the ‘Mega Grant for Leading International Scientists’ (£3,000,000) in Russia to establish the Laboratory for Cognitive Investigations and Behavioural Genetics at Tomsk State University (TSU) and to lead a program of interdisciplinary cross-cultural research into individual differences in cognition and learning.

Kovas has received the British Psychological Society Award for Outstanding Doctoral Research Contributions to Psychology; Goldsmiths Peake Award for learning and teaching; British Academy Wiley Prize in Psychology; APS Janet Taylor Spence Award, for Transformative Early Career Contributions; D.I. Mendeleev Medal from Tomsk State University for significant contribution to science and education; Russian Academy of Education Award for the significant contribution to fundamental and applied scientific research.

== Research interests ==
Kovas' research focuses on the origins of individual differences in cognitive abilities, emotional and motivational processes and academic achievement – towards more personalised educational approaches and to better education experience for all learners. She leads several large-scale studies that combine different methods (quantitative and molecular genetics; experimental psychology; neuroscience) with unique samples, including twins; longitudinal cohorts of families with children conceived through IVF; adolescents exhibiting extraordinary performance in the domains of science, music, art and sports; populations with different socio-demographic and educational environments. Professor Kovas teaches and leads research projects and is also a co-founder of the Accessible Genetics Consortium that aims to promote greater knowledge and beneficial use of etiological information. Kovas' book Oedipus Rex in the Genomic Era, co-authored with Fatos Selita, explores the benefits and risks brought by advances in genetic science. Her research interests also include applications of interdisciplinary research to policy, business and the arts. She is consultant at TechnoTruth, advising on education, wellbeing and behavioural genetics.

== Selected bibliography ==
- Yulia Kovas and Fatos Selita: Oedipus Rex in the Genomic Era, Plagrave Macmillan 2021, ISBN 978-1-349-96048-4
- Yulia Kovas and Philip S. Dale: The Genetic and Environmental Origins of Learning Abilities and Disabilities in the Early School Years, Wiley-Blackwell 2007
- Yulia Kovas, Sergey Malykh and Darya Gaysina: Behavioral Genomics: Child Development And Education, Publishing House of Tomsk State University, Tomsk 2016, ISBN 978-5-94621-585-5
- Yulia Kovas, Sergey Malykh and Darya Gaysina: Behavioral Genetics for Education, Palgrave MacMillan 2016, ISBN 978-1-137-43732-7
- Teemu Toivainen, Giulia Pannini, Kostas A. Papageorgiou, Margherita Malanchini, Kaili Rimfeld, Nicholas Shakeshaft and Yulia Kovas: Prenatal testosterone does not explain sex differences in spatial ability, Scientific Reports volume 8, Article number 13653, 2018 at www.nature.com
