= Giulio Lepschy =

Italian linguist and teacher (1935–2026)

Giulio Lepschy FBA
- Born: Giulio Ciro Lepschy; 14 January 1935; Venice, Italy
- Died: 8 February 2026 (aged 91); London, England
- Occupations: Linguist; professor
- Spouse: Anna Laura Momigliano (m. 1962)
- Relatives: Arnaldo Momigliano (father-in-law)

Academic background
- Education: University of Pisa; Scuola Normale Superiore di Pisa

Academic work
- Discipline: Linguistics
- Institutions: University of Zurich; University of Oxford; University of Reading; University College London; University of Toronto
- Main interests: Italian language

Giulio Ciro Lepschy (IPA: [ˈdʒuːljo ˈtʃiːro ˈlɛpski]; 14 January 1935 – 8 February 2026) was an Italian linguist and academic. He was Professor of Italian at the University of Reading from 1975 to 1997.

== Life and career ==
Born in Venice in 1935, Lepschy attended the University of Pisa and the Scuola Normale Superiore di Pisa. He carried out research at various European universities until 1964, when he was appointed to a lectureship at the University of Reading. He was promoted to a readership in 1967 and then to Professor of Italian in 1975. He remained in that post full-time until 1997, when he reduced his workload to part-time; he retired completely in 2000.

In 1987, Lepschy was elected a Fellow of the British Academy, the United Kingdom's national academy for the humanities. The Academy awarded him its Serena Medal in 2000, awarded annually for "eminent services towards the furtherance of the study of Italian history, philosophy or music, literature, art, or economics." He was admitted to the Accademia della Crusca in 1991, being appointed Accademico ordinario in 2010.

Lepschy died on 8 February 2026, at the age of 91.

== Bibliography ==
- Lepschy, Giulio C.. Some Problems in Linguistic Theory. United Kingdom, Academic Press, 1975.
- Lepschy, Anna Laura, and Lepschy, Giulio C.. The Italian Language Today. United Kingdom, Routledge, 1992.
- Lepschy, Giulio C.. Mother tongues and other reflections on the Italian language. Buffalo, University of Toronto Press, 2002.
- Lepschy, Giulio C.. History of Linguistics Volume II: Classical and Medieval Linguistics. United Kingdom, Taylor & Francis, 2014.
- Lepschy, Giulio C.. History of Linguistics Vol III: Renaissance and Early Modern Linguistics. United Kingdom, Taylor & Francis, 2014.
- Davies, Anna Morpurgo, and Lepschy, Giulio C.. History of Linguistics, Volume IV: Nineteenth-Century Linguistics. United Kingdom, Taylor & Francis, 2016.
- Giulio C. Lepschy, A survey of structural linguistics, London: Faber & Faber, 1970. Pp. 192.
