= Thomas Okey =

British basket weaver and scholar

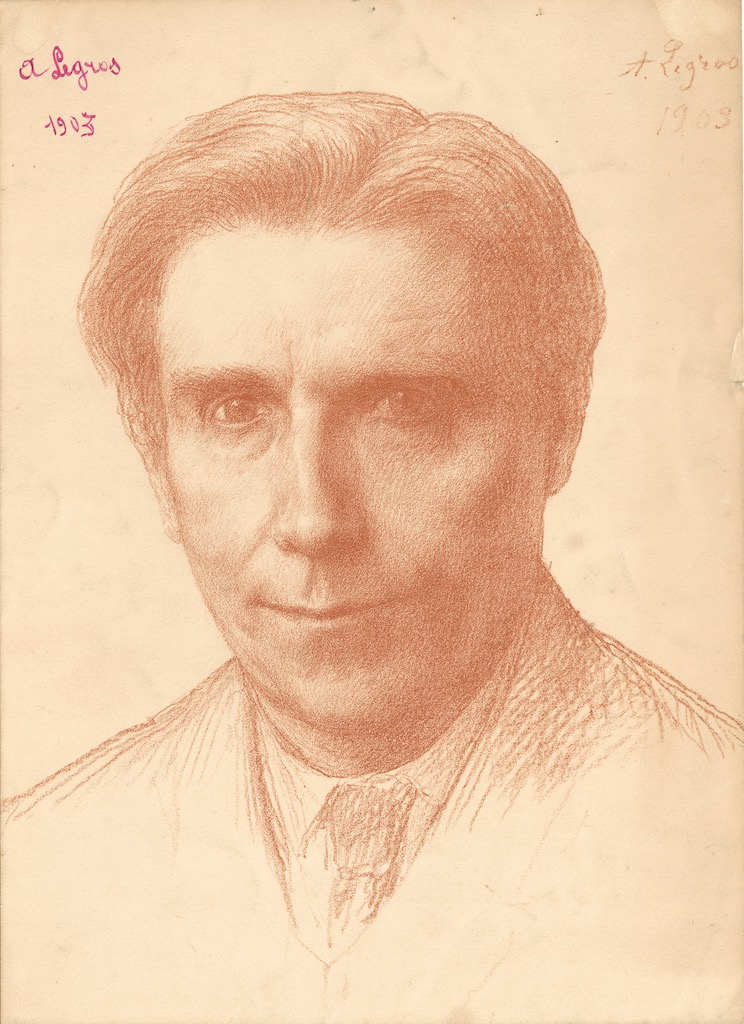
Portrait of Thomas Okey

Thomas Okey (30 September 1852 – 4 May 1935) was a British expert on basket weaving, a translator of Italian, and a writer on art and the topography of architecture and art works in Italy and France. Okey's first experience of the Italian language came when he attended the Extension Lectures at Toynbee Hall in the 1880s.

In 1919, he became the first Serena Professor of Italian at the University of Cambridge. Okey was a hereditary basket maker from a poor East End of London family, and on his appointment at Cambridge he stated that:

Money...social position as such counts for nothing...

and

the consciousness that one stands for what one is worth as a scholar and a man... All stand on an equality of worth, from the porter at the gate to the Master in the lodge.

He was made a Fellow of Gonville and Caius College in 1920. Okey was also a member of the Art Workers' Guild, and was elected Master in 1914.

== Works ==
- Essays by Joseph Mazzini most of them translated for the first time by Thomas Okey. London: J.M. Dent. 1894 – via Google Books.
- Venice and its Story (1904)
- Paris and its Story (1904)
- Dante's Purgatorio (translator).
- The Little Flowers of Saint Francis of Assisi
- The Story of Avignon (1926)
- The Little Flowers of St. Francis
- Selections From the Vita Nuova
- The Old Venetian Places and Old Venetian Folk
- A Basketful of Memories: An Autobiographical Sketch (1930)
