= Barbara J. Heath =

American archaeologist

Barbara J. Heath (born 1960) is a professor in the Department of Anthropology at The University of Tennessee, Knoxville who specializes in historical archaeology of eastern North America and the Caribbean. Her research and teaching focus on the archaeology of the African diaspora, colonialism, historic landscapes, material culture, public archaeology and interpretation, and Thomas Jefferson.

== Background ==
Heath was born in Norwood, Massachusetts in 1960. She received her Bachelor of Arts in Anthropology and Spanish from the College of William and Mary in 1982, and her MA (1983) and Ph.D. (1988) in American Civilization from the University of Pennsylvania. Her dissertation research focused on low-fired, hand-built coarse earthenwares made historically by people of African descent in the Caribbean, and is entitled Afro-Caribbean Ware: A Study of Ethnicity on St. Eustatius. Heath has conducted fieldwork in Virginia, Tennessee, and in the Lesser Antilles.

== Employment history ==
Heath is currently a Professor in, and Department Head of, the Department of Anthropology at the University of Tennessee, where she has worked since 2006. Previously, she directed the archaeology program at Thomas Jefferson's Poplar Forest (1992-2006), and worked as an archaeologist Monticello (1988-1991), the James River Institute for Archaeology(1987-1988), the Colonial Williamsburg Foundation (1985-1986), and the College of William and Mary (1983-1986).

== Key excavations ==
Heath has led or participated in a numerous research projects, including current work at Indian Camp and at Coan Hall in Virginia, at Poplar Forest, Monticello, Colonial Williamsburg, and Jordan's Point. In the Caribbean she has worked at Little Bay on Montserrat; as a member of the St. Kitts-Nevis Digital Archaeology Initiative; and on a variety of colonial sites on St. Eustatius, Netherlands Antilles.

== Research emphases ==
Heath is an anthropological archaeologist specializing in historical archaeology. Her research examines institutionalized slavery and racism in the Middle Atlantic, American South and Caribbean, and colonial frontier interactions in the Middle Atlantic, during the recent past (1600-1900). She examines how people, free and enslaved, created and used material culture—buildings, designed and vernacular landscapes, and handcrafted and mass-produced consumer goods—to promote and strengthen systems of inequality or to survive, challenge and reshape them. Her interests extend to the dynamics of exchange, whether through formalized relationships recorded in store accounts, or barter and trade. Currently, she is researching three areas: the production, exchange and use of pottery made by enslaved and free women of African descent in the eighteenth, nineteenth and twentieth centuries in the Leeward Islands; the enslaved communities of Thomas Jefferson in piedmont Virginia; and the origins of slavery in the seventeenth-century Potomac River valley.

== Selected books and monographs ==
- Heath, Barbara J. and Jack Gary, editors. 2012. Jefferson's Poplar Forest: Unearthing a Virginia Plantation. University Press of Florida, Gainesville.
- Heath, Barbara J., editor. 2001. Jamestown Archaeological Assessment, National Park Service, US Department of the Interior, Washington, D.C.
- Heath, Barbara J., 1999. Hidden Lives: The Archaeology of Slave Life at Thomas Jefferson's Poplar Forest. The University Press of Virginia, Charlottesville.
