= Anna Laura Lepschy =

Italian linguist

- Born: Anna Laura Momigliano; 30 November 1933 (age 92); Turin, Italy
- Spouse: Giulio Lepschy (m. 1962; died 2026)
- Father: Arnaldo Momigliano
- Awards: Serena Medal

Academic background
- Education: B.Litt, M.A., Somerville College, Oxford

Academic work
- Institutions: University College London

Anna Laura Lepschy (IPA: [ˈanna ˈlaura ˈlɛpski]; née Momigliano [momiʎˈʎaːno]; born 30 November 1933) is an Italian linguist. She is an Emeritus Professor in Italian at University College London.

== Early life and education ==
Lepschy was born on 30 November 1933 in Turin to Jewish parents Gemma Celestina (née Segre) and Arnaldo Dante Momigliano. She earned her Bachelor of Letters and Master's degree from Somerville College, Oxford.

== Career ==
In 1977, Lepschy and her husband Giulio Lepschy co-published a book titled The Italian Language Today through Hutchinson & Co. Publishers. The Italian Language Today is a reference book meant to provide an outline of the Italian language and grammar of contemporary Italian. She later co-edited a collection of essays titled Book Production and Letters in the Western European Renaissance:Essays in Honour of Conor Fahy. By 1994, Lepschy was the recipient of the Order of Merit of the Italian Republic and later with the Order of the Star of Italian Solidarity.

In 1984, Lepschy was appointed a Head of the Italian Department at the University College London and founded the Centre for Italian Studies. While teaching, Lepschy co-edited a book with Verina R. Jones titled With a Pen in Her Hand: Women and Writing in Italy in the Nineteenth Century and beyond. The book was a collection of essays delivered at the Conference on Women and Writing in Nineteenth-Century Italy in February 1997. In 2002, Lepschy co-edited another book titled Multilingualism in Italy, Past and Present with Arturo Tosi.

In 2011, Lepschy was the recipient of the Serena Medal from the British Academy.
