= Serena Professor of Italian =

The Serena Professorship of Italian is the senior professorship in the study of Italian language, literature and culture at the University of Cambridge, University of Oxford, University of Manchester and University of Birmingham. At Cambridge, it was founded in 1917 by a donation of £10,000 from Arthur Serena (died 1922), a shipbroker and son of the Venetian patriot Leone Serena. He also endowed the Serena Medal awarded annually by the British Academy for furtherance of the study of Italian history, philosophy, music, literature, art and economics.

== Serena Professors at Birmingham ==
- Linetta de Castelvecchio Richardson (1921–1946)
- J. H. Whitfield (1946–1974)
- Philip McNair (1974–1994)
- Michael Caesar (1994–2008)

== Serena Professors at Cambridge ==
- Thomas Okey (1919–1929)
- Raffaello Piccoli (1929–1933)
- Edward Bullough (1933–1934)
- Eric Reginald Pearce Vincent (1935–1962)
- Uberto Limentani (1962–1981)
- Patrick Boyde (1982–2002)
- Zygmunt Barański (2002–2012)
- Robert Gordon (2012–present)

== Serena Professors at Manchester ==
- E. G. Gardner (1920)
- P. Rébora (1923)
- Mario Praz (1932–1934)
- Walter Llewellyn Bullock (1935–1944)

(The chair was vacant between 1944 and 1961)

- Giovanni Aquilecchia (1961–1970)
- Thomas Gwynfor ('Gwyn') Griffith (1971–1988)
- David Robey (1989–1998)
- Maggie Günsberg (2000–2004)
- Stephen J. Milner (2006–present)

== Serena Professors at Oxford ==
- Cesare Foligno (1919–1940)
- Alessandro Passerin d'Entrèves (1946–1957)
- Cecil Grayson (1957–1987)
- unfilled (1987–1990)
- John Woodhouse (1990–2001)
- Martin McLaughlin (2001–2017)
- Simon Gilson (2018–present)

When after Grayson's retirement the Serena Chair was ‘frozen’, because of government funding cuts, Gianni Agnelli, head of Fiat, agreed a contribution of £750,000 to ‘unfreeze’ the Oxford Chair. In recognition of this benefaction, the name of the chair at Oxford became the Fiat-Serena Chair of Italian Studies.

In the summer of 2009 there was a further modification in nomenclature when the name changed to the Agnelli-Serena Chair of Italian Studies, a change which reflects more directly the role of the two great benefactors at the beginning and end of the twentieth century.
