= List of fellows of the British Academy elected in the 1980s =

The Fellowship of the British Academy consists of world-leading scholars and researchers in the humanities and social sciences. A varying number of fellows are elected each year in July at the academy's annual general meeting.

== 1980 ==
The following fellows of the British Academy were elected at the annual general meeting in 1980:

- Dr A. C. Baines
- Lord Briggs
- R. A. G. Carson
- M. H. Crawford
- P. M. Deane
- Professor F. R. H. Du Boulay
- Professor N. Hampson
- Dr P. Hunter Blair
- L. Kolakowski
- Dr C. Lewy
- Professor W. McKane
- J. Mellaart
- Professor A. C. Renfrew
- Rev. Professor G. C. Stead
- Professor E. T. Stokes
- Professor R. B. Tate
- Professor J. B. Trapp
- N. G. Wilson
- E. A. Wrigley
- D. E. C. Yale

== 1981 ==
The following fellows of the British Academy were elected at the annual general meeting in 1981:

- Professor J. L. Ackrill
- Dr F. R. Allchin
- Professor J. A. Barnes
- Professor Averil Cameron
- Professor A. C. Graham
- Professor F. H. Hinsley
- Professor J. P. Kenyon
- Dr E. Miller
- Professor M. Morishima
- Professor D. M. Nicol
- Professor S. S. Prawer
- Dr J. R. Rea
- Professor A. L. F. Rivet
- B. W. Robinson
- Professor J. D. Sargan
- Professor M. A. Screech
- Professor Q. R. D. Skinner
- Dr B. H. I. H. Stewart
- Professor Lord Wedderburn of Charlton
- Rev. Professor M. R. Wiles
- D. M. Wilson

== 1982 ==
The following fellows of the British Academy were elected at the annual general meeting in 1982:

- Professor M. D. K. Baxandall
- Professor T. J. Brown
- Professor T. Burns
- Professor P. Collinson
- Rev. Professor C. E. B. Cranfield
- Professor G. E. Daniel
- J. C. R. Dow
- Professor S. E. Finer
- B. F. Harvey
- Professor H. D. Jocelyn
- E. L. Jones
- Professor G. H. Jones
- R. C. Latham
- O. W. Neighbour
- J. M. Reynolds
- Professor Dr O. J. L. Szemerényi
- Professor C. G. Thorne
- Dr C. Webster

== 1983 ==
The following fellows of the British Academy were elected at the annual general meeting in 1983:

- Dr C. F. L. Austin
- Professor C. F. Beckingham
- Professor Margaret A. Boden
- Professor D. W. Bowett
- Professor D. Ellis Evans
- Professor C. H. Feinstein
- Rev. Professor W. H. C. Frend
- Professor C. H. Gifford
- Professor P. G. Hall
- D. M. G. Hirst
- Professor G. S. Holmes
- M. S. F. Hood
- Sir Michael Levey
- K. J. Leyser
- Dr G. E. R. Lloyd
- J. H. McDowell
- D. H. Mellor
- Professor B. G. Mitchell
- Dr K. O. Morgan
- Professor A. W. B. Simpson
- Very Rev. Professor T. F. Torrance
- P. M. Williams

== 1984 ==
The following fellows of the British Academy were elected at the annual general meeting in 1984:

- Professor A. B. Atkinson
- Dr J. H. Baker
- Professor K. Bourne
- Professor H. N. Bull
- M. F. Burnyeat
- M. R. F. Butlin
- J. Campbell
- Professor W. R. Cornish
- E. P. M. Dronke
- Dr G. Dudbridge
- Dr R. J. W. Evans
- Professor A. A. B. Fairlie
- J. H. Goldthorpe
- Professor F. R. D. Goodyear
- Professor F. R. Hodson
- Professor M. K. Hopkins
- Dr P. J. Jones
- Rev. Professor Canon J. Macquarrie
- Professor J. A. Mirrlees
- Professor N. G. Parker
- Professor M. D. Reeve
- N. K. Sandars
- Professor T. J. Smiley

== 1985 ==
The following fellows of the British Academy were elected at the annual general meeting in 1985:

- Dr J. J. G. Alexander
- Professor C. R. Bawden
- Professor M. W. Beresford
- M. Biddle
- G. A. Cohen
- Professor S. M. Cretney
- Professor A. E. M. Davies
- Professor J. K. Davies
- Dr J. Diggle
- Dr R. A. Donkin
- Professor A. A. M. Duncan
- Professor J. Erickson
- Dr H. H. Erskine-Hill
- P. L. Gardiner
- Dr G. A. Holmes
- Professor R. A. Markus
- Professor P. H. Matthews
- Professor K. R. Norman
- Professor J. R. Pole
- Professor S. J. Prais
- Professor B. S. Pullan
- Professor B. B. Shefton
- Professor H. S. Smith
- Professor E. G. Stanley
- M. Tregear
- Professor J. E. Varey
- G. Vermes

== 1986 ==
The following fellows of the British Academy were elected at the annual general meeting in 1986:

- Professor K. R. Andrews
- Professor G. W. Brown
- Professor J. A. Burrow
- Professor J. W. Burrow
- Professor P. W. Edwards
- J. Griffin
- Dr G. L. Harriss
- Professor E. J. A. Henderson
- Professor I. R. J. Jack
- Dr P. N. Johnson-Laird
- Dr J. P. C. Kent
- Professor I. M. Lewis
- Professor D. E. Luscombe
- Professor D. N. MacCormick
- Dr A. D. J. Macfarlane
- Professor D. F. McKenzie
- Professor H. G. T. Maehler
- Dr J. I. R. Montagu
- D. A. Parfit
- Professor R. H. Robins
- Professor A. J. Ryan
- Professor R. B. Serjeant
- Professor G. Williams
- Professor J. J. Wilkes
- Professor D. N. Winch
- Professor T. P. Wiseman

== 1987 ==
The following fellows of the British Academy were elected at the annual general meeting in 1987:

- J. Barnes
- Professor D. J. Bartholomew
- Professor P. Boyde
- J. M. Budden
- Professor D. A. Davie
- Professor R. R. Davies
- Dr A. C. de la Mare
- The Lord Goff of Chieveley
- Professor K. H. D. Haley
- Dr R. J. Hayward
- Professor D. F. Hendry
- J. G. Hurst
- Professor C. M. Kauffmann
- Professor K. H. Kuhn
- Professor G. N. Leech
- Professor G. C. Lepschy
- Dr Steven Lukes
- Professor A. S. Milward
- Rev. Professor E. W. Nicholson
- Professor J. Raz
- T. J. Reed
- L. D. Reynolds
- Professor P. J. Rhodes
- Professor A. M. Strathern
- Professor B. E. Supple

== 1988 ==
The following fellows of the British Academy were elected at the annual general meeting in 1988:

- Professor M. J. Artis
- Professor B. M. Barry
- Dr C. J. Bliss
- Professor J. M. Crook
- Professor J. H. R. Davis
- Professor A. D. Deyermond
- Dr P. G. M. Dickson
- Professor R. B. Dobson
- Professor E. B. Fryde
- Professor G. M. J. Gazdar
- Professor R. M. Goode
- Rt Rev.. Professor R. P. C. Hanson
- Dr A. M. Hudson
- Professor G. Jahoda
- Dr S. C. Levinson
- J. R. Lucas
- Dr P. G. Mackesy
- Professor D. P. O'Brien
- M. R. Popham
- Dr R. D. F. Pring-Mill
- Professor T. O. Ranger
- E. D. Rawson
- F. M. B. Reynolds
- Dr J. M. Rogers
- Dr R. S. Schofield
- Dr N. J. Sims-Williams
- Professor T. C. Smout
- Professor A. H. Woolrych

== 1989 ==
The following fellows of the British Academy were elected at the annual general meeting in 1989:

- Professor M. Anderson
- Professor D. E. D. Beales
- Professor P. H. Birks
- Dr C. Blacker
- Professor M. Blaug
- Professor N. P. Brooks
- Dr P. F. Clarke
- Professor A. G. Cross
- Professor P. S. Dasgupta
- Professor M. Douglas
- Professor J. M. Dunn
- Professor A. M. Everitt
- Professor R. F. Foster
- Professor P. France
- Professor D. Gray
- Professor E. A. J. Honigmann
- Dr J. Iliffe
- Professor R. M. Kempson
- Professor M. A. Knibb
- Professor G. E. Rickman
- Professor E. P. Sanders
- Professor R. R. K. Sorabji
- Professor A. C. Thomas
- Dr J. D. Thomas
- Professor P. J. Trudgill
- Dr C. J. White
- Dr M. Williams

=== Senior fellows ===
- Professor D. Black
- Dr E. J. M. Bowlby
- Professor H. Jenkins
- Professor H. G. Koenigsberger
- Professor A. McIntosh
- Professor W. S. Watt
- Professor B. Woledge
