= Yenisey Governorate =

1822–1925 administrative-territorial unit of Russia

Coordinates: 56.0167°N 92.8667°E

Yenisey Governorate Енисейская губерния (Russian)
- Governorate of the Russian Empire (1822–1917), Russian Republic and RSFSR (1917–1925)
- 1822–1925
- Coat of arms

- Capital: Krasnoyarsk
- Area
- 2,516,930 km^{2} (971,790 sq mi)
- Population
  - 1897: 570,161
- History
  - Established: 1822
  - Disestablished: 1925
Preceded by	Succeeded by
Tomsk Governorate	Siberian Krai
- Today part of: Russia
- Media related to Yeniseysk Governorate at Wikimedia Commons

Yeniseysk Governorate (Russian: Енисе́йская губе́рния, romanised: Yeniseyskaya guberniya) was an administrative-territorial unit (guberniya) between 1822–1925 of the Russian Empire, the Russian Republic, and the Russian SFSR.

== General information ==
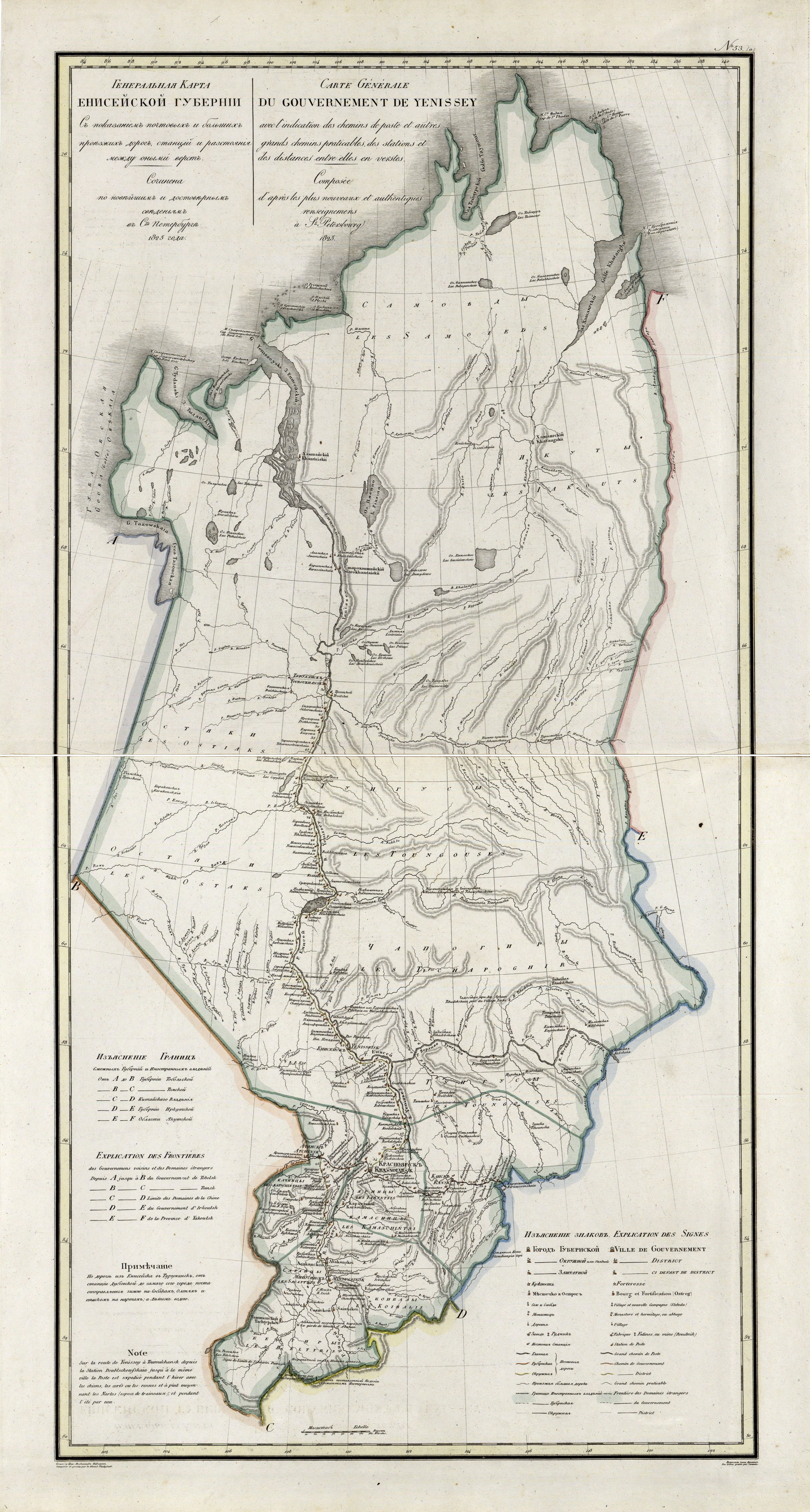
1825 map of Yeniseysk Governorate

In 1724 the Yeniseysk Province based on Yeniseysk was established within the Siberia Governorate, and disestablished in 1775. Its extents approximately corresponded to the future Yeniseysk Governorate (1822–1925).

The Governorate was established on 26 January [O.S. 7 February] 1822 when the territory of Siberia General Governorate was divided into two Governorate-Generals: West-Siberian and East-Siberian according to the decree of Alexander I "On the division of Siberia into two general governments" of the administrative reform under the project of Mikhail Speransky.

On 22 July [O.S. 3 August] 1822, the Yeniseysk Governorate with the administrative centre of Krasnoyarsk was separated from the Tomsk Governorate to become a part of East-Siberian Governorate General.

The Yeniseysk Governorate were located in the western part of Eastern Siberia between 52° 20' and 77° 33' north latitude and 95° and 128° east longitude. It stretched from the southern to the northern limits of the Russian Empire. The area looked like an irregular polygon, elongated in the direction from the southwest to the northeast. The greatest length of the Yeniseysk Governorate from China to the extreme northern tip of Asia (a cape in the east of the Taymyr Peninsula) is 2,800 versts (3,000 km), the greatest width from west to east is up to 1,300 versts (1,400 km). The Yeniseysk Governorate was bounded in the north by the Arctic Ocean, in the northeast by the Vilyuysk okrug of the Yakutsk Oblast, in the east and southeast by the Kirensky Uyezd and Nizhneudinsky Uyezd of the Irkutsk Governorate, and in the south by China. In the west, Yeniseysk Governorate bordered on West Siberian General Governorate. In the southwest and west with the Kuznetskiy Okrug, Marinsky Uezd and Narymsky of the Tomsk Governorate, from the northwest with the Beryozovsky Uezd of the Tobolsk Governorate.

The area of the Yeniseysk Governorate was 2,211,589 square versts (2,516,926 km^{2}) —the second largest province, after the Yakutsk Oblast).

== Coat of arms of the Yeniseysk Governorate ==
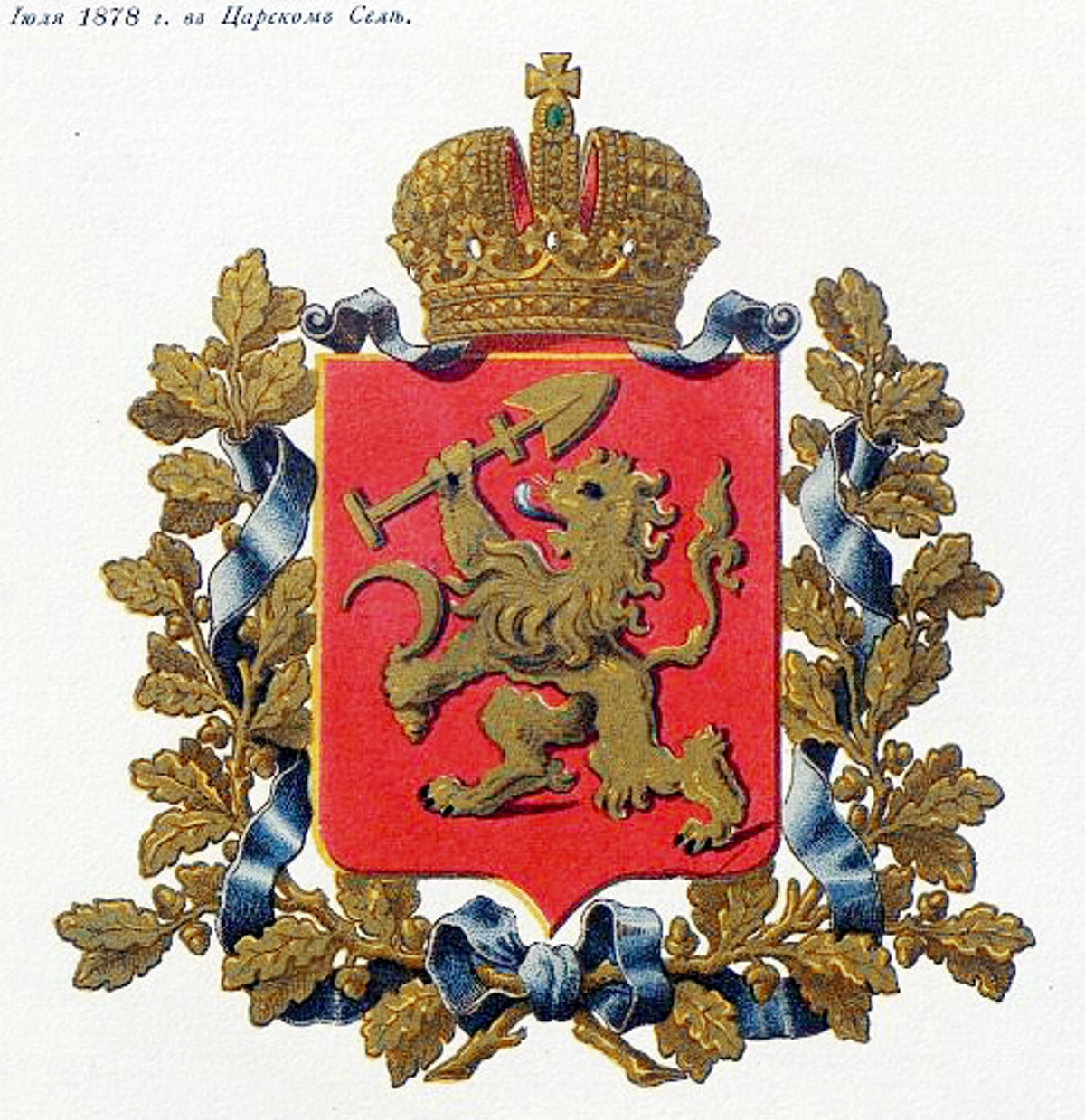
Official Russian Empire coat of arms Eniseisk Governorate, 1880.

“In a scarlet shield, a golden lion with azure eyes and tongue, and black claws, holding the same sickle in its right paw. The shield is surmounted by the imperial crown and surrounded by golden oak leaves connected by St. Andrew's ribbon.

The coat of arms of the Yenisei Governorate was approved on 5 July 1878 by the All-Russian Emperor Alexander II. In 1886, decorations were removed from the city shields by the armorial department under the Department of Heraldry.

The lion symbolised strength and courage, and the sickle and shovel reflected the main occupation of the inhabitants—agriculture and mining, primarily gold.

== History ==
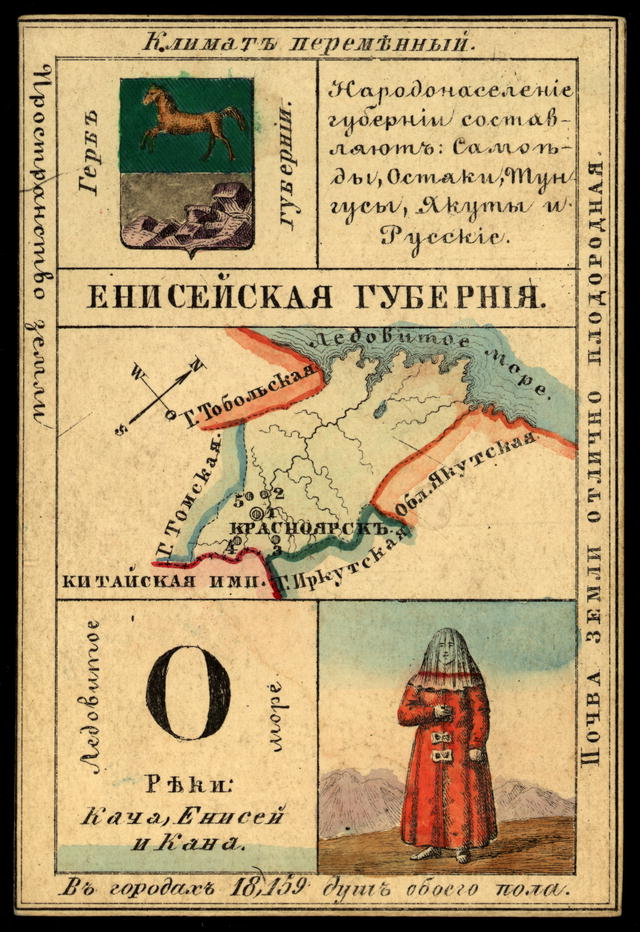
Outer side

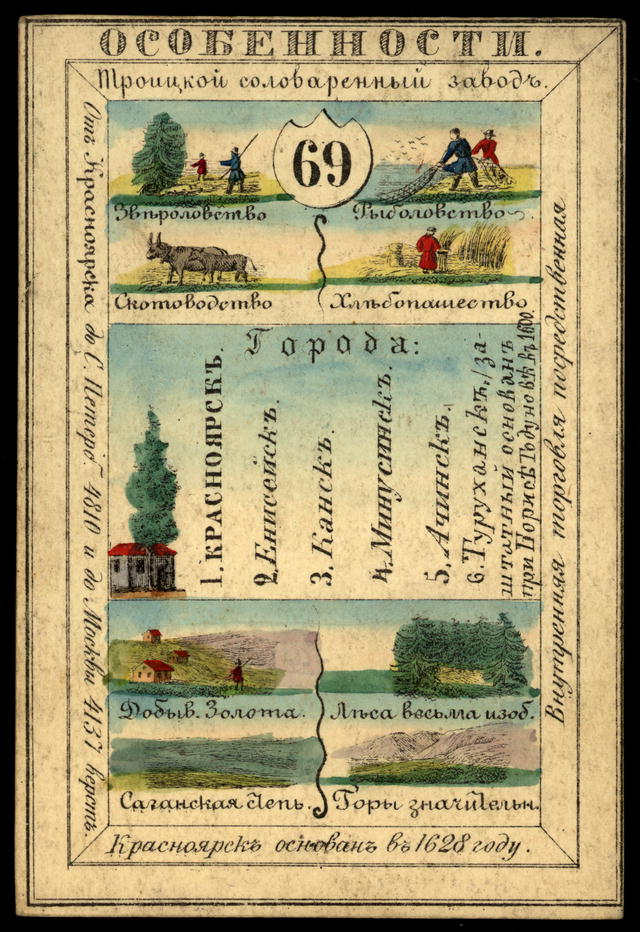
Reverse side

Yeniseisk Governorate. Loto card. Russian Empire, 1856

=== 17th century ===
Until 1629, the territory of the modern Krasnoyarsk Krai was part of a vast region with the centre in the city of Tobolsk. Later, the ostrog (fortress) of Yeniseysk, Krasnoyarsk and Kansk with adjacent lands were assigned to the Tomsk razryad.

In 1676, the Yeniseysk ostrog received the status of a city, under which all the settlements along the Yenisei river and the right-bank territories stretching to Transbaikal were transferred.

=== 18th century ===
Nansen's Siberia expedition, 1913

By the Decree of 18 December 1708, Peter the Great carried out territorial and administrative transformations to streamline the administration of the state. The entire territory of the Russian Empire was divided into eight governorates. This main administrative unit of the governorate was subdivided into uezds (also spelt as uyezds).

Siberia and part of the Urals became part of the Siberia Governorate with the centre in the city of Tobolsk. Due to the long distances, the lack of means of communication, the administration of the subterritories of the Siberia Governorate was extremely difficult. There was a need for territorial transformations. In 1719 by a second administrative reform, three provinces were established as part of the Siberia Governorate: Vyatka, Solikamsk, and Tobolsk, and five years later two more - Irkutsk Governorate and Yeniseisk Governorate with a centre in the city of Yeniseysk. The Yeniseisk Governorate included the following uezds (listed as towns): Mangazeya, Yeniseysk, Krasny Yar, Tomskoy, Kuznetskoy, Narym, and Ketsk.

In 1764, by decree of Catherine the Great, the territory of Siberia was subjected to another administrative-territorial reform: a second Governorate was established - Irkutsk Governorate, which included the Yeniseisk Governorate. Two decades later, the Yeniseisk Governorate was liquidated, its uezds were included in three Governorate: Tobolsk (Yeniseysk and Achinsk), Irkutsk and Kolyvan (Krasnoyarsk).

From 1797 to 1804, all the territories of the Yenisei River basin were assigned to the Tobolsk Governorate. From 1804 until 1822, they were part of the Tomsk Governorate).

=== 19th century ===
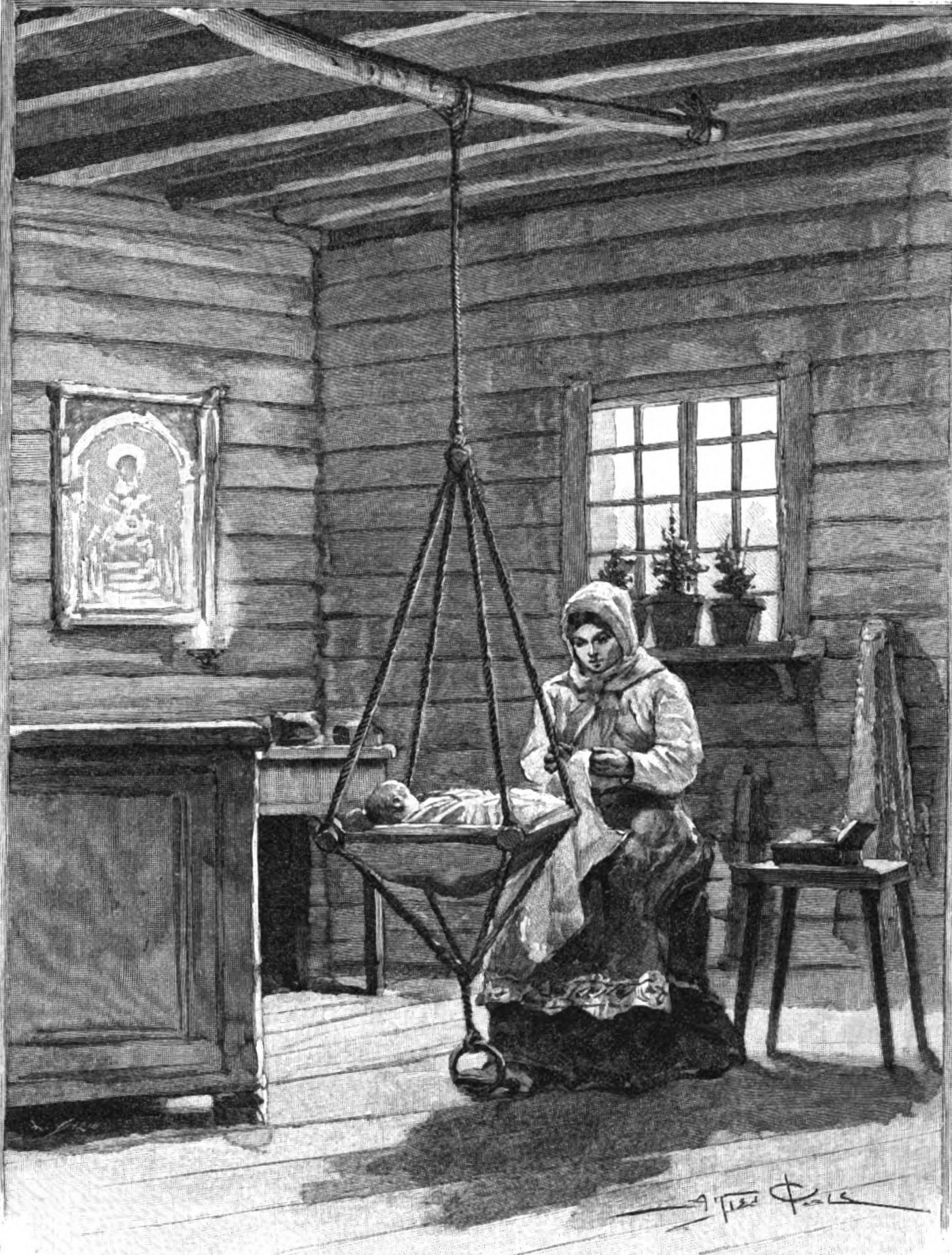
The ingenious device that the Siberian women have devised to rock children without interrupting sewing work (1894)

In order to centralise management in 1803, the Siberian General Governorate was created with the centre in the city of Irkutsk, which absorbed the territories of Tobolsk Governorate, Irkutsk Governorate, and Tomsk Governorate.

In 1822, this system of territorial subordination was abolished, and the West Siberian General Governorate (centre Tobolsk) and East Siberian General Governorate (centre Irkutsk) were created instead. The Siberian people belonged to the inorodtsy class, and their nomadic status was confirmed by a special system of self-government "steppe duma - foreign government - tribal government", in accordance with the "charter on the management of foreigners".

At the same time, at the suggestion of M. M. Speransky, who was conducting an audit of the Siberian possessions, Emperor Alexander I signed a decree on the formation of the Yeniseysk Governorate as part of five districts: Krasnoyarsk, Yeniseisk (with Turukhansk Territory), Achinsk, Minusinsk and Kansk. The city of Krasnoyarsk was approved as the administrative centre of the newly formed province.

On 26 February 1831, the Senate issued a decree "On the organisation of the post office in the Yeniseysk Governorate". A provincial post office was established in Krasnoyarsk, postal expeditions were established in Yeniseysk and Achinsk, and post offices were opened in Kansk, Minusinsk, and Turukhansk.

For 50 years after the creation of the Yeniseysk Governorate, minor changes took place in the administrative structure of the Russian Empire: in 1879, the okrug (districts) were renamed uezd (counties). The territory of the Yeniseysk Governorate did not undergo any changes and basically coincided with the borders of the modern Krasnoyarsk Krai. In 1886, the Usinsky border okrug (Usinsky Krai) was separated from Minusinsk Uyezd.

In 1882, the Ob–Yenisei Canal construction started, and in 1891 it was open for navigation of small ships.

In 1892 Charles Vapereau made a journey from Beijing to Paris through Siberia published about his travel in journal with drawings and engravings from his photos.

The province of Yeniseisk is very fertile; the governor tells us that in the district of Minousinsk, 200 versts (210 km) to the south, rye costs 5 kopecks a pood, and that the harvest of 1889 is currently being sold. Only is cultured. If there are means of communication downstream, this country would be the granary of Siberia. While there is no grain to sell here, there is scarcity and famine 1,000 versts (1,100 km) to the west and the starving peasants are forced to emigrate.

— Charles Vapereau, From Beijing to Paris: Korea, Amour and Siberia, XXII. From Krasnoyarsk to Tomsk.

=== 20th century ===
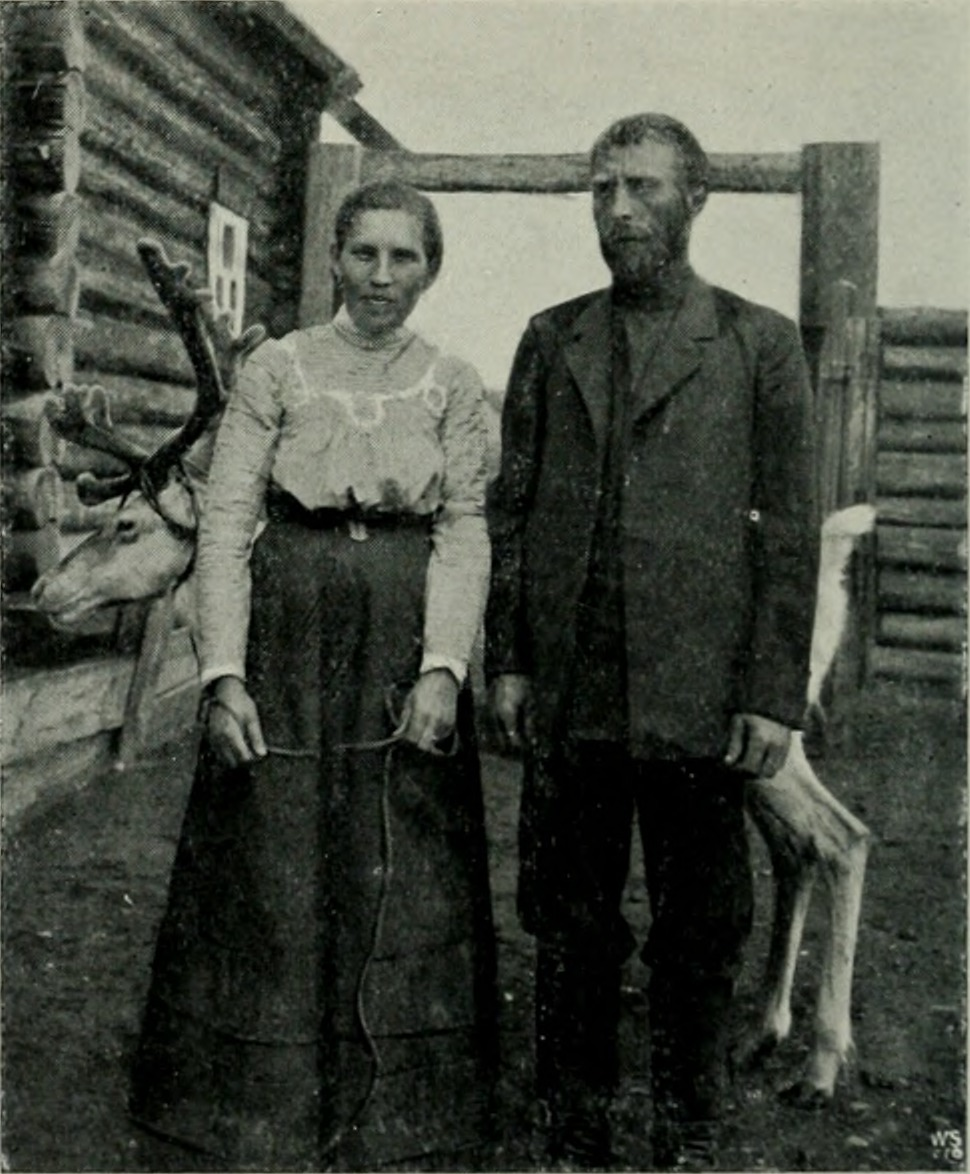
Stepan Semenovich Petrov with his wife. The Norwegian Sibirie Expedition's journey to Jenisei's sources (1914).

Since 1913, the Yeniseysk Governorate had been part of the Irkutsk Governor General. In the summer of 1913, Fridtjof Nansen travelled to the Kara Sea, by the invitation of Jonas Lied, as part of a delegation: Vostrotin Stepan Vasilyevich (Siberian public figure, polar explorer, politician and diplomat), Iosif Grigorievich Loris-Melikov (secretary of the Russian mission in Norway), etc, investigating a possible Northern Sea trade Route between Western Europe and the Siberian interior. The party then took the barge Turukhansk up the Yenisei River to Krasnoyarsk, and then through China along the Chinese Eastern Railway reached Vladivostok, on the way stopped in Khabarovsk, where he met a famous Russian traveller, explorer of the Ussuri krai, Lieutenant Colonel Vladimir Arsenyev, from where he returned by cars, horses and at that time the unfinished northern route of the Trans-Siberian Railway to Norway through Yekaterinburg, where he participated in a meeting of the Russian Geographical Society, reporting on the voyage along the Yenisei. Nansen published a report from the journey in book Through Siberia.

In 1913 the Usinsk border okrug was transformed into the Usinsk-Uriankhai Krai. On 17 April 1914, the Russian government establishes a protectorate over Uryankhay Krai (conforming roughly to the territory of modern Tuva), which became part of the Yeniseysk Governorate.

In the summer 1914 Norwegian expedition (botanist Henrik Printz, ornithologist Orjan Olsen, zoological assistant Anders Olsen, photographer Fritz Jensen, and assistant Josif Ermilowitsch Gutschin togheter with the local Russian archaeological and anthropological researchers from Minusinsk) was exploring southern Siberia and north-western Mongolia "the so-called Urjankai country, a tract of land about the sources of the Yenisei, as yet almost entirely unknown" "terra incognita" as it was described in resulting books "The vegetation of the Siberian-Mongolian frontiers: (the Sayansk region)" and "To Jenisei's sources. The Norwegian Sibirie Expedition's journey".

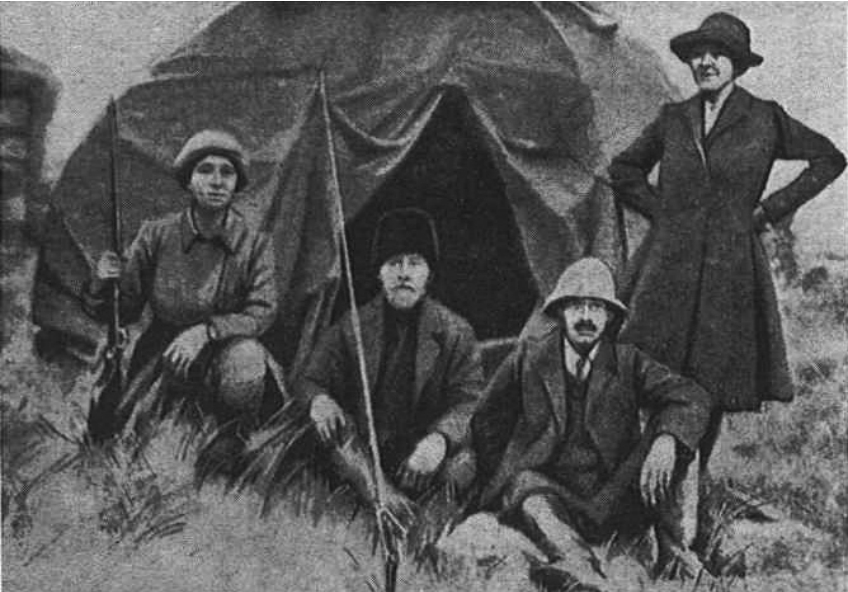
Oxford Expedition (1914). From left to right Maud Doria Haviland, Vasily Korobeinikov, Henry Usher Hall, Dora Curtis

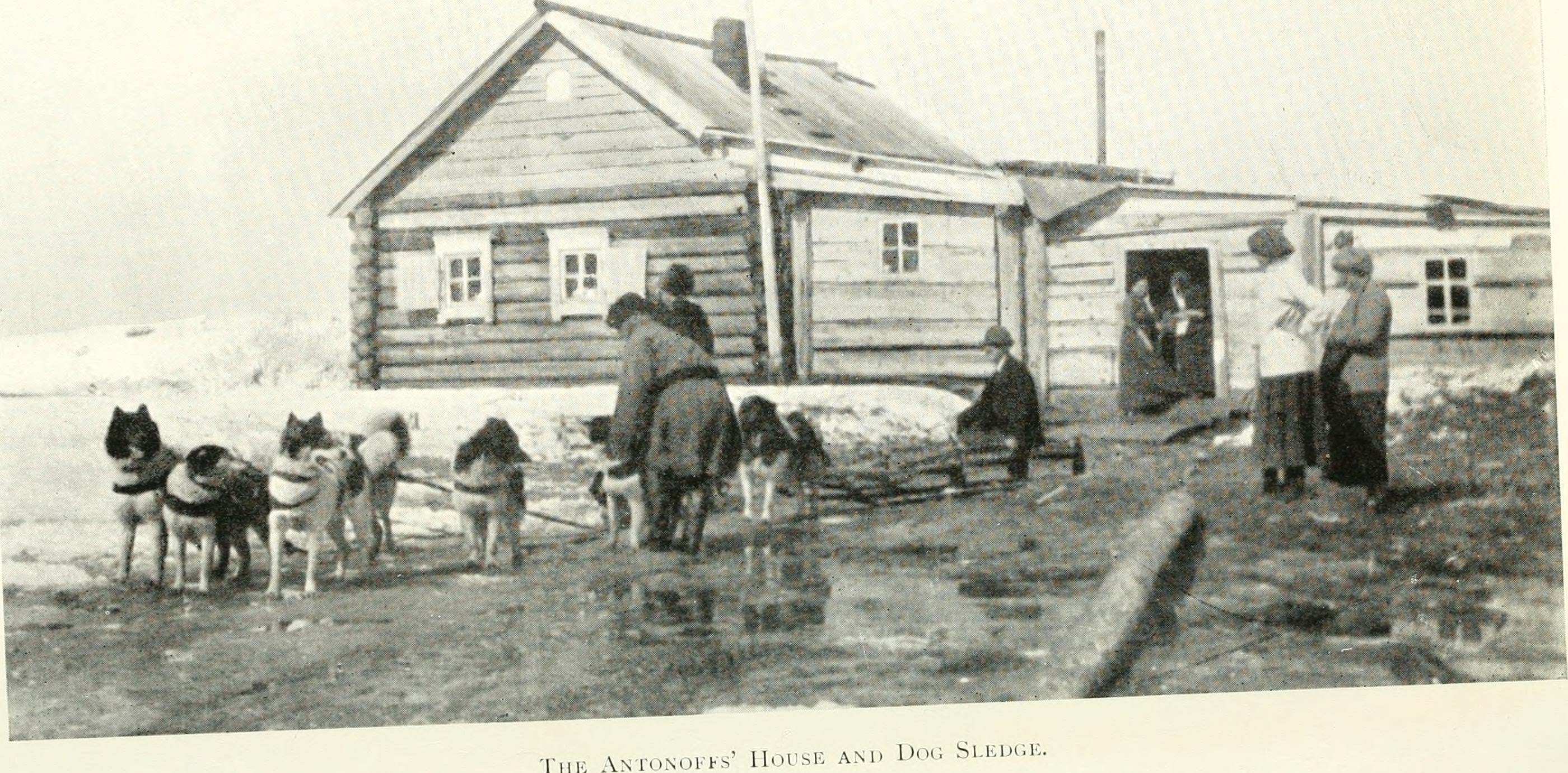
"Summer on the Yenisei" (1914). From Maud Doria Haviland's book about the expedition and the results of ornithological research

In 1914, an ethnographic expedition from researchers of the museums of Oxford and Pennsylvania made a trip along the Yenisei, consisting of anthropologist Maria Czaplicka, anthropologist Henry Usher Hall, ornithologist Maud Doria Haviland, painter Dora Curtis, and Vasily Korobeinikov. The researchers travelled overland to Krasnoyarsk, along the Trans-Siberian Railway and on the "Oryol" steamer climbed the Yenisei to the mouth of the Golchikha, where they spent the summer studying the nature and beliefs of the indigenous peoples of Siberia.

A similar administrative-territorial division persisted until the early 1920s. Uryankhay Krai existed until 14 August 1921, when local revolutionaries, supported by the Red Army of the RSFSR, decided to proclaim the national sovereignty of Tuvan People's Republic. Apart from Mongolia, however, no other country recognised its independence.

Since 1923, work began on the zoning of Siberia, which marked the beginning of the administrative reorganisation of the territory of the region. Volosts were abolished, enlarged uezds (districts) were created.

On 14 November 1923, parts of the Yeniseysk Governorate's Minusinsky and Achinsky Uyezds were merged with one volost of Kuznetskiy Uyezd of Tomsk Governorate to form new Khakassky Uyezd. On 19 March 1924, Siberian Revolutionary Committee (Sibrevkom) approved the enlargement of the Yeniseysk governorate's uezds (districts).

The Usinsk okrug was formed in 1924 as part of the Yeniseisk Governorate, but already in 1925 it became part of the Minusinsk okrug of the Siberian Krai. On 23 June 1924, new Turukhansky Uezd was formed in the governorate. Its Yuzhnaya Volost was formed on the part of the territory of Antsiferovskaya Volost of Yeniseysky Uyezd. After that, Yeniseysky Uezd itself was abolished and its remaining territory split between Kansky and Krasnoyarsky Uyezds. At the same time, Daurskaya Volost of Achinsky Uyezd was transferred to Krasnoyarsky Uezd. Also in 1924, parts of Znamenskaya and Tashtypskaya Volosts of Minusinsky Uyezd were transferred to Khakassky Uyezd. The former territory became a part of Charkovskaya Enlarged Volost, while the latter was merged into Tashtypskaya Enlarged Volost.

On 25 May 1925, all Governorates (including Yeniseysk Governorate), and regions in Siberia are abolished by the decree of the All-Russian Central Executive Committee, their territories are merged into a single Siberian Krai, with the centre in Novosibirsk, along with the territories of Oyrat Autonomous Oblast, and Altai, Novo-Nikolayevsk, Omsk, and Tomsk Governorates. Achinsky, Kansky, Krasnoyarsky, Minusinsky, and Khakassky Uezds of the governorate were at the same time transformed into okrugs, while Turukhansky Uezd was renamed Turukhansky Krai and transferred to Krasnoyarsk Okrug.

== Administrative division ==
As of its foundation, the governorate included five okrugs (districts) from former uezd (counties):

- Krasnoyarsk Okrug;
- Yeniseysk Okrug (included the territory of the abolished Turukhansky Krai).
- Achinsky Okrug (from western part of Krasnoyarsky Uezd, south-west of the Yenisei Uezd and north-east of Tomsky Uezd);
- Minusinsky Okrug (separated from the southern part of the Krasnoyarsky Uezd);
- Kansky Okrug (from parts of the Krasnoyarsky Uezd, Yenisei Uezd, Ilan volost and Biryusinsk volost of the Nizhneudinsky Uezd of the Irkutsk Governorate from the Biryusa river to the Kan river);

The administrative-territorial division of the Yenisei province remained basically unchanged until 1924. Only the volost division changed. The number of volosts in the province is 35. Turukhansky Krai is divided into 3 sections, the same volosts.

Since 1898, the okrugs (districts) of the Yenisei Governorate were called uezd (counties) again. At the end of the 19th century, the Yeniseysk Governorate included 5 uezds (since 1898 - okrugs) and the Turukhansky Krai.

№	Uezd (Okrugs)	Centre	Uezd town coat of arms	Area	Population (1897)	Volosts
1	Achinsky	Achinsk (6,699 people)	Coat of Arms of Achinsk (Krasnoyarsk krai) (1785)	51,071.0 square versts (58,122.0 km^{2})	111,466	Balakhtinskaya, Nazarovskaya, Pokrovskaya, Meletskaya Inorodskaya Council, Kyzylskaya Steppe Duma, Uzhurskaya volost
2	Yeniseysk	Yeniseysk (11,506 people)	Coat of Arms of Yeniseisk (Krasnoyarsk krai) (1804)	384,303.7 square versts (437,361.5 km^{2})	67,536	Anuiferovskaya, Belskaya, Kazachinskaya, Kezhemskaya, Maklakovskaya, Pinchugskaya, Yalanskaya
3	Kansky	Kansk (7,537 people)	Coat of Arms of Kansk (Krasnoyarsk krai) (1855)	70,962.7 square versts (80,760.0 km^{2})	96,202	Antsirskaya, Irbeyskaya, Rybinskaya, Taseevskaya, Tinskaya, Ustyanskaya, Urinskaya, Shelaevsky society
4	Krasnoyarsk	Krasnoyarsk (26,699 people)	Coat of Arms of Krasnoyarsk (Krasnoyarsk krai) (1851)	19,024.0 square versts (21,650.5 km^{2})	99,156	Voznesenskaya, Botoiskaya, Zaledeevskaya, Elovskaya, Nakhvalskaya, Pogorelskaya, Sukhobuzimskaya, Chastostrovskaya
5	Minusinsky	Minusinsk (10,231 people)	Coat of Arms of Minusinsk (1854)	79,571.9 square versts (90,557.8 km^{2})	182,733	Abakanskaya, Abakanskaya foreign council, Askyzskaya steppe duma, Beyskaya volost, Ermakovskaya volost, Idrinskaya, Kuraginskaya, Novoselovskaya, Sagayskaya, Tesinskaya, Shushenskaya, Usinsky border okrug
6	Turukhansky Krai	Turukhansk (212 people)	Coat of Arms of Turukhansk (Krasnoyarsk krai) (1804)	1,609,824.2 square versts (1,832,080.1 km^{2})	10,959	3 sections

== Population ==
In the 1760s-1780s, exile to Siberia became widespread. In the 1820s, these exiles constituted the second largest group of residents of Minusinsk. In 1863, 44,994 exiles lived in the Yeniseisk Governorate, which was 1/7 of the entire population of the province.

In the second half of the 19th-early 20th centuries, the formation of the population of the Yeniseisk Governorate occurred as a result of both ongoing spontaneous and organised migration processes. According to the results of the General Census of 1897, the Russian-speaking population, consisting of Siberians—the Starozhily (Russian: старожилы, lit. 'Old-Timers, Old-Settlers') and later settlers "Raseyskie", prevailed, and the bulk of the inorodtsy population, consisting of indigenous peoples of Siberia.

According to the 1897 census, 570,200 people lived in the province, including 62,900 people in cities (11.7%). The estimated population in 1906 was almost entirely Russian, the rest (about 10%) consisting of Samoyedes, Tatars, Tunguses, Yakuts, Mongols, and Ostyaks. The religious composition was dominated by Orthodox (93.8%), there were also Old Believers (2.1%), Catholics (1.1%), Jews (1.1%), Muslims (0.8%), and Lutherans (0.7%). The literacy rate is 13.7%.

== See also ==
- Tunguska event (1908)
- Kropotkin, Peter Alexeivitch; Bealby, John Thomas (1911). "Yeniseisk (government)" . Encyclopædia Britannica. Vol. 28 (11th ed.). pp. 914–915.
- Nansen Expedition (1913)
