= International Critical Commentary =

The International critical commentary on the Holy Scriptures of the Old and New Testaments (International Critical Commentary or ICC) is a series of commentaries in English on the text of the Old Testament and New Testament. It has been published by T&T Clark, now an imprint of Bloomsbury Publishing.

Initially started in 1895, the International Critical Commentary series is a highly regarded academic-level commentary on the Bible. The ICC is described as "a venerable institution in biblical study and interpretation", "known for its detailed, critical, and theological interpretation" and "the gold standard of critical commentaries for the last century". It aims to marshall all available aids to exegesis: linguistic, textual, archaeological, historical, literary and theological. No unifying scheme is sought but each scholar has been free to express their expertise. Many of its volumes continue to be cited as among the best commentaries on their respective books, decades after they were written.

The original editors of the series were Samuel Rolles Driver, Alfred A. Plummer and Charles Augustus Briggs. The series has been in the hands of various editors since. A new series began with C. E. B. Cranfield's commentary on Romans in 1975 under the editorship of Cranfield, John Emerton and Graham Stanton. As of the 2020s, the editors are Stuart Weeks, Christopher M. Tuckett, and Jacqueline Vayntrub.

== Volumes ==
- Skinner, John E. (1910). Genesis. 552 pages
- Gray, G. Buchanan (1903). Numbers. 489 pages
- Driver, S. R. (1902). Deuteronomy. 434 pages
- Moore, George F. (1895). Judges. T. & T. Clark. ISBN 978-0-567-05004-5. 476 pages
- Smith, Henry P. (1899). Samuel I and II. 421 pages
- Gehman, H. S.; Montgomery, James A. (1951). Kings I and II. 574 pages
- Curtis, E. L.; Madsen, Albert (1910). Chronicles I and II. 534 pages
- Batten, L. W. (1913). Ezra and Nehemiah. 384 pages
- Paton, L. B. (1908). Esther. T. & T. Clark. 334 pages
- Driver, S. R.; Gray, G. Buchanan (1921). Job. 360 pages
- Briggs, Charles A.; Briggs, E. G. (1906). Psalms: Volume 1. 360 pages
- Briggs, Charles A.; Briggs, E. G. (1907). Psalms: Volume 2. 571 pages
- Toy, C. H. (1899). Proverbs. New York, C. Scribner's Sons. 554 pages
- Barton, G. A. (1908). Ecclesiastes. Journal of Biblical Literature. 212 pages
- Williamson, Hugh G. M. (2006). Isaiah 1–5. 448 pages
- Williamson, Hugh G. M. (2018). Isaiah 6–12. 808 pages
- Gray, George Buchanan (1912). Isaiah 1–27. 472 pages
- Goldingay, John; Payne, David (2006). Isaiah 40–55, vol. 1. 424 pages
- Goldingay, John; Payne, David (2006). Isaiah 40–55, vol. 2. 392 pages
- Goldingay, John (2014). Isaiah 56–66. 560 pages
- McKane, William (1986). Jeremiah 1–25. 658 pages
- McKane, William (1986). Jeremiah 26–52. 1,396 pages
- Salters, R. B. (2010). Lamentations. 416 pages
- Cooke, G. A. (1936). Ezekiel. 557 pages
- Montgomery, James A. (1927). Daniel. 478 pages
- Macintosh, A. A. (1997). Hosea. 600 pages
- Harper, W. R. (1905). Amos and Hosea. New York, C. Scribner's Sons. 424 pages
- Smith, John Merlin Powis; Ward, W. H.; Bewer, J. A. (1911). Micah, Zephaniah, Nahum, Habakkuk, Obadiah, and Joel. 560 pages
- Bewer, J. A.; Smith, John Merlin Powis; Mitchell, H. G. (1912). Haggai, Zechariah, Malachi, and Jonah. 515 pages
- Allen, Willoughby C. (1907). St. Matthew. 350 pages
- Allison, Dale C.; Davies, W. D. (2004). Matthew 1–7. 731 pages
- Allison, Dale C.; Davies, W. D. (1991). Matthew 8–18. 807 pages
- Allison, Dale C.; Davies, W. D. (1991). Matthew 19–28. 789 pages
- Gould, Ezra P. (1896). St. Mark. New York, C. Scribner's sons. 317 pages
- Plummer, Alfred A. (1896). St. Luke. New York, C. Scribner's Sons. 592 pages
- McHugh, John (2009). John 1–4. 368 pages
- Bernard, J. H. (1928). St. John 1–7, vol. 1. 740 pages
- Bernard, J. H. (1928). St. John 8–21, vol. 2. 740 pages
- Barrett, C. K. (1994). Acts: Volume 1. 692 pages
- Barrett, C. K. (1998). Acts: Volume 2. 1,272 pages
- Headlam, A. C.; Sanday, William W. (1895). The Epistle to the Romans. 450 pages
- Cranfield, C. E. B. (1975). The Epistle to the Romans: Volume 1. 480 pages
- Cranfield, C. E. B. (1979). The Epistle to the Romans: Volume 2. 496 pages
- Plummer, Alfred A.; Robertson, Archibald (1911). The First Epistle of St. Paul to the Corinthians. 424 pages
- Plummer, Alfred A. (1915). The Second Epistle of St. Paul to the Corinthians. New York, Scribner. 404 pages
- Thrall, Margaret E. (1994). The Second Epistle to the Corinthians 1–7. 978 pages
- Thrall, Margaret E. (1994). The Second Epistle to the Corinthians 8–13. 978 pages
- Burton, Ernest DeWitt (1920). The Epistle to the Galatians. 539 pages
- Best, Ernest (1998). Ephesians. 685 pages
- Abbott, Thomas K. (1902). The Epistles to the Ephesians and to the Colossians. New York, C. Scribner's sons. 315 pages
- McL. Wilson, Robert (2005). Colossians and Philemon. 512 pages
- Vincent, Marvin R. (1897). Philippians and Philemon. C. Scribner's sons. 201 pages
- Frame, J. E. (1912). Thessalonians. New York, C. Scribner's Sons. 326 pages
- Lock, W. W. (1924). Pastoral Epistles. 163 pages
- Marshall, I. Howard (1999). Pastoral Epistles. 882 pages
- Moffat, J. J. (1924). The Epistle to the Hebrews. 264 pages
- Ropes, J. H. (1916). The Epistle of St. James. 319 pages
- Allison, Dale C. (2013). James. 848 pages
- Williams, Travis B.; Horrell, David G. (2023). 1 Peter: Volume 1. 853 pages
- Bigg, C. C. (1901). The Epistles of St. Peter and St. Jude. New York, C. Scribner's Sons. 353 pages
- Brooke, A. E. (1912). The Johannine Epistles. 242 pages
- Charles, R. H. (1920). The Revelation of St. John: Volume 1. 373 pages
- Charles, R. H. (1920). The Revelation of St. John: Volume 2. 497 pages
- Weeks, Stuart (2020). A critical and exegetical commentary on Ecclesiastes. London: T&T Clark. ISBN 9780567031136.
- Tuckett, Christopher M. (2024). A Critical and Exegetical Commentary on Galatians. London New York: T&T Clark. ISBN 9780567139191.
- Boer, Martinus C. de (2025). Introduction and commentary on John 1 - 6. London New York: T&T Clark. ISBN 978-0567429056.
- Keener, Craig (2026). Mark 1-4: A Critical and Exegetical Commentary. T&T Clark. ISBN 9780567668356.

== See also ==
- Anchor Bible Series
- Exegesis
- Textual criticism
- List of Biblical commentaries
