= Charles Augustus Briggs =

American scholar and theologian

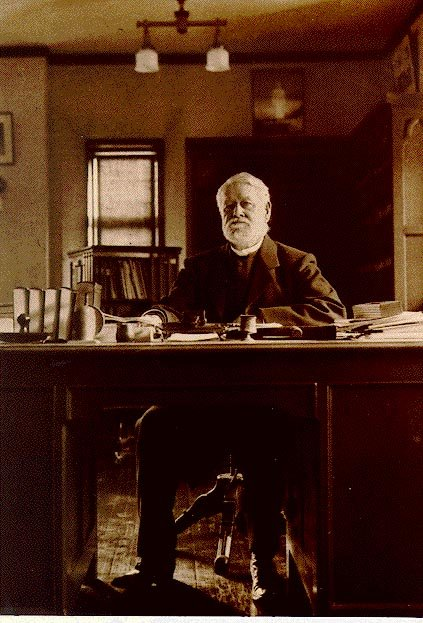
Charles Augustus Briggs

Charles Augustus Briggs (January 15, 1841 – June 8, 1913), American Presbyterian (and later Episcopalian) scholar and theologian, was born in New York City, the son of Alanson Briggs and Sarah Mead Berrian. He was excommunicated from the Presbyterian Church for heresy due to his liberal theology regarding the Bible.

== Early life ==
Briggs was educated at the University of Virginia (1857–1860); graduated at the Union Theological Seminary in 1863; and, after the American Civil War during which he served in the 7th Regiment of the New York Militia, studied further at the University of Berlin from 1866 to 1869. In 1870, he was appointed pastor of the First Presbyterian Church of Roselle, New Jersey which post he held until 1874, when he accepted the professorship of Hebrew and cognate languages at Union Theological Seminary in which he taught until 1891, and of Biblical theology there from 1891 to 1904, following which he became their professor of theological encyclopaedia and symbolics. At the Union Theological Seminary, he also served as head librarian for the Burke Library. From 1880 to 1890 he was an editor of the Presbyterian Review.

== Heresy trial ==
In 1892 Briggs was tried for heresy by the presbytery of New York, including James McCook, and acquitted. The charges were based upon his inaugural address of the preceding year. In brief, they were as follows:

- that he had taught that reason and the Church are both a fountain of divine authority, which, apart from Holy Scripture, does savingly enlighten men
- that errors may have existed in the original text of the Holy Scripture
- that Old Testament predictions have been reversed by history and that the great body of Messianic prediction has not and cannot be fulfilled
- that Moses is not the author of the Pentateuch and that Isaiah is not the author of the second half of the book that bears his name
- that the processes of redemption extend to the world to come (he had considered it a fault of Protestant theology that it limits redemption to this world and that sanctification is not complete at death).

After much posturing, maneuvering and publicity-seeking by Briggs, the General Assembly of the Presbyterian Church, to which the case was appealed, defrocked and excommunicated Briggs from the Presbyterian Church in 1893 in Washington, DC. Some have argued that General Assembly's finding of heresy was influenced, in part, by Briggs' belligerent manner and militant tone of expressions and by what his own colleagues in the Union Theological Seminary called the dogmatic and irritating nature of his inaugural address.

After his condemnation by the Presbyterians, he turned towards Episcopalianism and was ordained as a priest of the Protestant Episcopal Church in 1899. His scholarship procured for him the honorary degree of D.D. from the University of Edinburgh (1884) and from the University of Glasgow (1901), and that of D.Litt., from the University of Oxford (1901). With Francis Brown and S. R. Driver he prepared a revised Hebrew and English Lexicon (1891–1905, commonly known as Brown Driver Briggs or BDB) based on the lexicon of Wilhelm Gesenius, and, with Driver, edited The International Critical Commentary series.

== Works ==
His publications included the following:

- Biblical Study: Its Principles, Methods and History (1883)
- Hebrew Poems of the Creation (1884)
- American Presbyterianism: Its Origin and Early History (1885)
- Messianic Prophecy (1886)
- Biblical history, 1889
- Whither? A Theological Question for the Times (1889)
- The Authority of the Holy Scripture (1891)
- The Bible, the Church and the Reason (1892)
- The Higher Criticism of the Hexateuch (1893)
- The Messiah of the Gospels (1894)
- The Messiah of the Apostles (1894)
- General introduction to the study of Holy Scripture (1899)
- New Light on the Life of Jesus (1904)
- The Ethical Teaching of Jesus (1904)
- A Critical and Exegetical Commentary on the Book of Psalms (2 vols., 1906–7), in which he was assisted by his daughter
- The Virgin Birth of Our Lord (1909)
- Theological Symbolics (1914, posthumous)

== See also ==
- Princeton Theological Seminary
- Princeton Theology
- Union Theological Seminary
- Presbyterianism
- Charles Hodge

== Sources ==
- The Presbyterian Review, 1880–89, made available by Princeton Theological Seminary
- Briggs, Charles Augustus (1889). "Redemption after Death". The Magazine of Christian Literature. 1 (3). This is one of the major sources of clashes between Briggs and embedded doctrine.
- Christensen, Richard L. (1995). The ecumenical orthodoxy of Charles Augustus Briggs (1841–1913). Lewiston, New York: Mellen University Press. ISBN 978-0-7734-2273-5.
- Kugel, James (2007). How to Read the Bible: A Guide to Scripture, Then and Now. New York: Free Press (Simon & Schuster). ISBN 978-0-7432-3586-0., which includes a relation of Briggs' process as well as additional details of his life.
- Massa, Mark Stephen (1988). ""Mediating Modernism": Charles Briggs, Catholic Modernism, and an Ecumenical "Plot"". The Harvard Theological Review. 81 (4): 413–430. doi:10.1017/S001781600001018X. S2CID 162199605.
- Massa, Mark Stephen (1990). Charles Augustus Briggs and the crisis of historical criticism. Minneapolis: Fortress Press. ISBN 978-0-8006-7079-5.
- Sawyer, M. James (1994). Charles Augustus Briggs and tensions in late nineteenth-century American theology. Lewiston, New York: Mellen University Press. ISBN 978-0-7734-9961-4.
- Smith, H. P. (1913). "Chas. Augustus Briggs". American Journal of Theology. 17 (October): 497–508. doi:10.1086/479273. S2CID 145000466.
