= Francis Brown (theologian) =

American theologian

The Rev. Francis Brown (December 26, 1849 – October 15, 1916) was an American Semitic scholar born in Hanover, New Hampshire.

== Biography ==
He was the son of Samuel Gilman Brown (1813–1885), president of Hamilton College from 1867 to 1881, and the grandson of Francis Brown, whose removal from the presidency of Dartmouth College and later restoration were incidental to the famous Dartmouth College case.

The younger Francis graduated from Phillips Academy, Andover in 1866, from Dartmouth in 1870 and from the Union Theological Seminary in 1877, and then studied in Berlin. In 1879 he became instructor in biblical philology at the Union Theological Seminary, in 1881 an associate professor of the same subject, and in 1890 Davenport Professor of Hebrew and the cognate Languages.

Brown's published works won him an honorary doctorate of Divinity from the University of Glasgow (1901), and a D.Litt. from the University of Oxford, as well as honorary doctorates from Dartmouth and Yale. The works are, with the exception of The Christian Point of View (1902; with Profs. A. C. McGiffert and G. W. Knox), almost purely linguistic and lexical, and include Assyriology: its Use and Abuse in Old Testament Study (1885), and the important revision of Gesenius' Lexicon, undertaken with S. R. Driver and C. A. Briggs — Brown Driver Briggs, A Hebrew and English Lexicon of the Old Testament (1891–1905).

He also contributed to the Encyclopaedia Biblica.

He died from heart disease at his home in New York City on October 15, 1916.
