= Maria Czaplicka =

Polish anthropologist

Maria Antonina Czaplicka
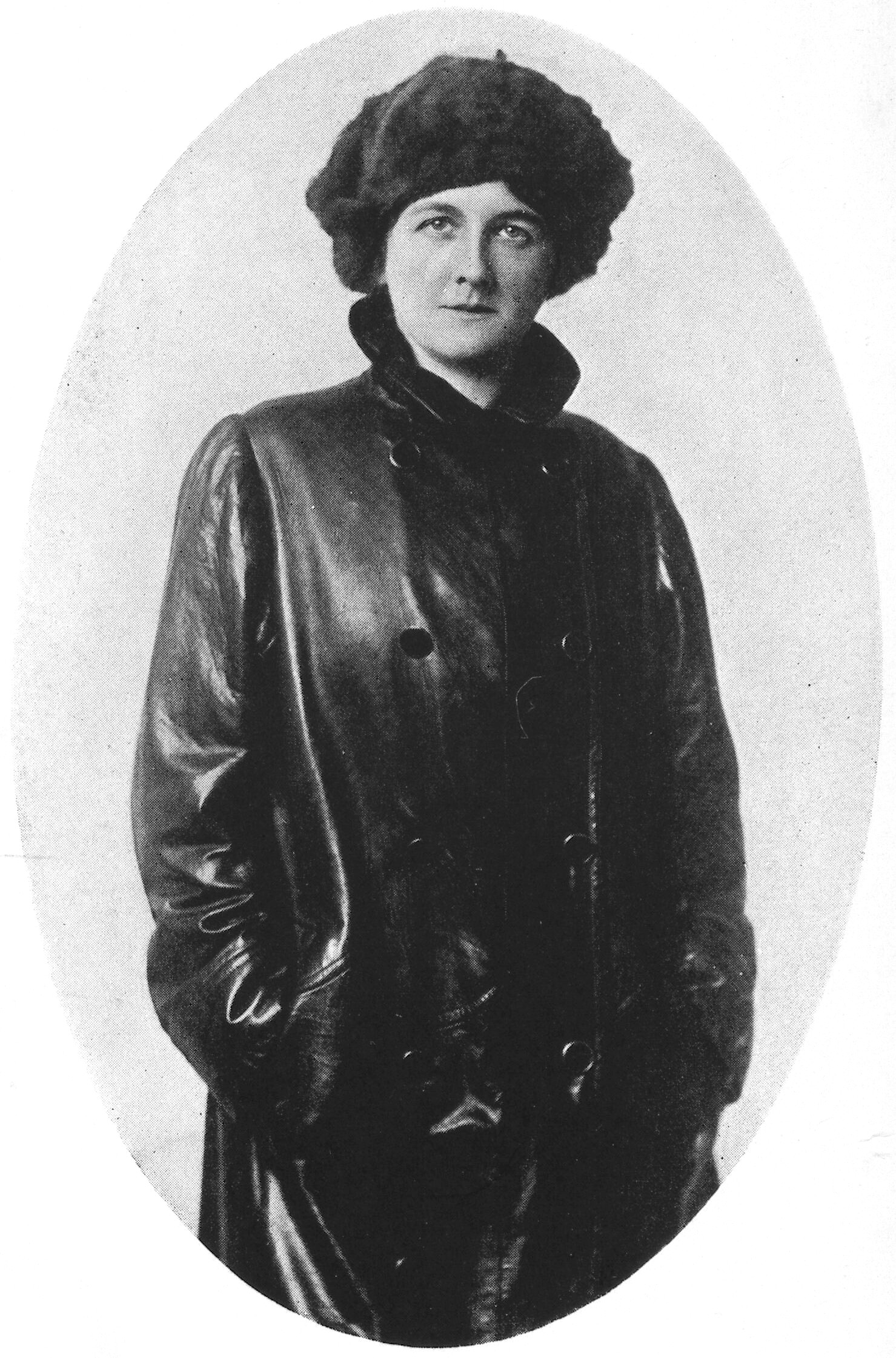
- Czaplicka in 1916
- Born: 25 October 1884; Warsaw, Congress Poland, Russian Empire
- Died: 27 May 1921 (aged 36); Bristol, England, United Kingdom
- Occupation: Anthropologist

Maria Antonina Czaplicka (25 October 1884 – 27 May 1921), also referred to as Marya Antonina Czaplicka and Marie Antoinette Czaplicka, was a Polish cultural anthropologist who is best known for her ethnography of Siberian shamanism. Czaplicka's research survives in three major works: her studies in Aboriginal Siberia (1914); a travelogue published as My Siberian Year (1916); and a set of lectures published as The Turks of Central Asia (1918). Curzon Press republished all three volumes, plus a fourth volume of articles and letters, in 1999.

== Early life and studies ==
Czaplicka was born in the Stara Praga district of Warsaw on the 25th of October 1884 to Feliks Czaplicki and Zofia Zawisza. Her father Feliks Czaplicki came from impoverished Polish nobility and worked as a railway clerk and station master. She was the third oldest of her parents' five children, Jadwiga Markowska (née Czaplicka), Stanisław Czaplicki, Gabriela Szaniawska (née Czaplicka), and Marian Czaplicki. Feliks Czaplicki found employment in what is now Latvia, where the family lived from 1904 to 1906 before returning to Warsaw. It was here that Maria Czaplicka was able to take the exam that would allow her to attend university later in life.

She began her studies at the Anna Jasieńska Girls' School and attended the school until 1902. She began her studies in higher-education with the so-called Flying University (later Wyższe Kursy Naukowe), an underground institution of higher education in Russian-held Poland. She supported herself with a number of poorly paid jobs, as a teacher at Łabusiewiczówna Girls' School, a secretary, and lady's companion. She was also known for her lectures at the University for Everyone (1905–1908), and the Society of Polish Culture. She also wrote poetry, eventually being published in Warsaw's Odrodzenie magazine. While battling an illness, she spent time in Zakopane where she went on to do work for the Pedological Society while writing Olek Niedziela, a novel for children centered around education. In 1910 she became the first woman to receive a Mianowski Scholarship, and was therefore able to continue her studies in the United Kingdom.

She left Poland in 1910. Taken ill with appendicitis in late March 1911, she was admitted to St Batholomew's Hospital in London. She continued her studies at the Faculty of Anthropology of the London School of Economics under Charles G. Seligman, and at Somerville College, Oxford under R.R. Marett, graduating from the School of Anthropology in 1912. Marett encouraged her to use her Russian language skills in a review of literature on native tribes in Siberia, which became her book Aboriginal Siberia, published in 1914. In 1914, she became a member of the Royal Anthropological Society, and was also involved with the British Association for the Advancement of Science, presenting research centered around the connection between religion and the environment in Siberia. At this stage she had never visited Siberia, but the quality of her writing led to Aboriginal Siberia becoming the major reference work in its field.

== Yenisei Expedition ==
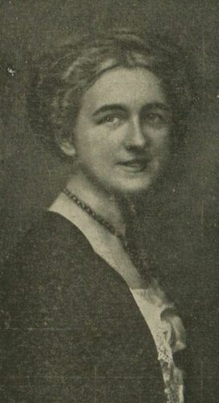
Czaplicka, 1919

Marett had intended the work reported in Czaplicka's Aboriginal Siberia to be the basis for fieldwork in Siberia. In May 1914, she began such fieldwork, partly funded by the Mary Ewart Travelling Scholarship granted by Somerville College, leading a joint expedition of Oxford University and University of Pennsylvania Museum of Archaeology and Anthropology staff. Together with English ornithologist Maud Doria Haviland, English painter Dora Curtis, and Henry Usher Hall of the Museum, she arrived in Russia shortly before World War I broke out. After the war started Czaplicka and Hall decided to continue their expedition while the others decided to go back to the United Kingdom. Czaplicka and Hall (accompanied by Michikha, a Tungus woman) spent the entire winter traveling along the shores of the Yenisei River via the Oryol: more than 3,000 kilometres (1,900 mi) altogether.

Czaplicka prepared several hundreds of photographs of people of Siberia, as well as countless notes on anthropometry and their customs. Czaplicka also received funds from the Committee for Anthropology of the Pitt Rivers Museum in Oxford to collect specimens from Siberia; 193 objects were donated by Czaplicka to the museum's Asian collection. In addition, she collected botanical specimens for the Fielding-Druce Herbarium. It is speculated that recordings of the many languages that they encountered during their expedition were produced on wax cylinders, but this has not been proven and the recordings are not well-known and likely never made it through academic processing if they were brought back to the university. The overall results of the expedition were modest, something that historians have credited to the nature of the study and the many financial and political struggles faced by the team during the journey.

She was also well known for her criticisms of the term "Arctic Hysteria" to refer to the Western perspective of the presentation of nervous diseases. She encourages cultural relativism, meaning that aspects of one culture should not be viewed and judged through the lens of a different culture when it comes to this situation. She describes that what Western academics called hysteria was viewed through a much different lens in Siberian cultures. This was all a part of her works studying Shamanism in Siberia.

== Return to England and death ==
Czaplicka returned to England in 1915. She wrote a diary of her travel entitled My Siberian Year, which was published in 1916 by Mills & Boon (in their non-fiction "My Year" series); the book became very popular. In 1916, she also became the first female lecturer in anthropology at Oxford University, supported by the Mary Ewart Trust. She gave lectures on the nations of Central and Eastern Europe as well as on the habits of the Siberian tribes. She also spoke on Polish issues, including Danzig's post-war disposition.

In 1920, her work was honoured with a Murchison Grant from the Royal Geographical Society, "for her ethnographical and geographical work in Northern Siberia." In spite of this triumph, her financial future was still insecure. Her three-year fellowship at Oxford having expired in 1919, she obtained a temporary teaching position in anthropology in the Department of Anatomy at the University of Bristol.

In 1921, she was not awarded the Albert Kahn Travelling Fellowship which she had hoped for, and in May of that year she poisoned herself. The University of Bristol Senate expressed its regret and "appreciation of the loss to the University of so distinguished a member of its staff". Czaplicka is buried in the Wolvercote Cemetery in Oxford.

== Legacy ==
In a will written months before she died, Czaplicka left her notes and reports to her colleague Henry Usher Hall. Although she never married, questions have been raised about the relationship between Hall and Czaplicka. Hall married the artist Frances Devereux Jones about a month after Czaplicka's death.

After Hall died in 1944, some of Czaplicka's early papers were donated to the University of Pennsylvania Museum, but at least one report and a partial manuscript may be lost. Her primary papers are archived at Somerville College, Oxford. Polish museums hold a few private letters of Czaplicka to Bronisław Malinowski and Władysław Orkan, one of the most prominent Polish poets of the time.

Upon her death in 1971, Barbara Aitkin (née Barbara Freire-Marreco), a student of Marett and friend of Czaplicka's, memorialised Czaplicka with a fund at Somerville College. In 2015, the Pitt Rivers Museum in Oxford held a small exhibition entitled "My Siberian Year, 1914–1915" to commemorate the 100th anniversary of Czaplicka's expedition to Siberia.

== Selected works ==
- Aboriginal Siberia: A Study in Social Anthropology. Oxford: Clarendon Press, 1914.
- The Influence of Environment upon the Religious Ideas and Practices of the Aborigines of Northern Asia. Folklore. 25. pp. 34–54. 1914.
- "The Life and Work of N.N. Miklubo-Macklay". Man. 14. pp. 198–203, 1914.
- My Siberian Year. London, Mills and Boon, 1916.
- "Tribes of the Yenisei. The Oxford Expedition". Times Russian Supplement. 13. p. 6. 18 September 1915.
- Siberia and some Siberians Journal of the Manchester Geographical Soc. 32. pp. 27–42. 1916.
- The Siberian Colonist or Sibiriak In W. Stephens ed. The Soul of Russia. London: Macmillan. 1916
- On the track of the Tungus. Scottish Geographical Magazine. 33. pp. 289–303. 1917.
- "Ostyaks". Encyclopædia of Religion and Ethics. volume 9. pp. 289–303. 1917
- "The Evolution of the Cossack Communities". Journal of the Central Asian Society. 5. pp. 42–58. 1918.
- "A plea for Siberia". New European. 6. pp. 339–344. 1918.
- The Turks of Central Asia in History and at the Present Day, An Ethnological Inquiry into the Pan-Turanian Problem, and Bibliographical Material Relating to the Early Turks and the Present Turks of Central Asia. Oxford: Clarendon Press. 1918.
- "Poland". The Geographical Journal. 53:36. 1919.
- "Samoyed". Encyclopædia of Religion and Ethics. volume 11. pp. 172–177. 1920
- "Siberia, Siberiaks, Siberians". Encyclopædia of Religion and Ethics. volume 11. pp. 488–496. 1920
- The Ethnic versus the Economic Frontiers of Poland. Scottish Geographical Magazine. 36. pp. 10–16. 1920.
- "History and Ethnology in Central Asia". Man. 21. pp. 19–24. 1921.
- "Tungus". Encyclopædia of Religion and Ethics. volume 12. pp. 473–476. 1921
- "Turks". Encyclopædia of Religion and Ethics. volume 12. pp. 476–483. 1921

== See also ==
- List of Poles
