= Hastings' Dictionary of the Bible =

Hastings' Dictionary of the Bible was a five-volume Biblical encyclopaedia published 1898–1904.

== First edition ==
The full title was A Dictionary of the Bible, dealing with the Language, Literature and Contents, including the Biblical Theology. It was edited by James Hastings, with the assistance of John A. Selbie. Additional assistance with revision of the proofs was provided by A. B. Davidson, S. R. Driver and H. B. Swete. Four volumes (1898—1902) divided up the alphabetic entries, with a fifth volume (1904) devoted to some extra articles, indexes and maps. Publication was by T. & T. Clark in Edinburgh and Charles Scribner's Sons in New York.

Although described as a "dictionary", the work is better described as an encyclopaedia, with signed articles sometimes several pages in length. It is a substantial work, with five quarto volumes each of about 900 pages. The 194 authors of articles were established scholars of the day, generally Protestant Christians, from many countries, but mostly from the UK and the USA in that order.

The subject matter was "the Old and New Testaments, together with the Old Testament Apocrypha, according to the Authorized and Revised English Versions." Articles were written "on names of all Persons and Places, on the Antiquities and Archaeology of the Bible, on its Ethnology, Geology and Natural History, on Biblical Theology and Ethic ...".

It remains a good source of Biblical information as understood around 1900.

== 1909 edition ==
A one-volume dictionary with the same name was issued by the same publishers in 1909. It was described as "not a condensation of the five-volume set, but new and independent work." The editor was James Hastings, with the co-operation of John A. Selbie, and with the assistance of John C. Lambert and Shailer Mathews. 992 pages + xvi + 4 maps.

== 1963 edition ==
A completely up-dated and revised one-volume edition was written by 148 scholars, edited by Frederick C. Grant and H. H. Rowley and issued by the same publishers in 1963. 1059 pages + maps.
