= Hebrew and Aramaic Lexicon of the Old Testament =

Scholarly dictionary

The Hebrew and Aramaic Lexicon of the Old Testament ("HALOT") is a scholarly dictionary of Biblical Hebrew and Aramaic, which has partially supplanted Brown–Driver–Briggs.

It is a translation and updating of the German-language Koehler-Baumgartner Lexicon, which first appeared in 1953, into English; the first volume was published in 1994 the fourth volume, completing the Hebrew portion, was published in 1999, and the fifth volume, on Aramaic, was published in 2000. The work was re-issued in 2001 as an unabridged two-volume set.

It differs from Brown–Driver–Briggs in being ordered alphabetically, instead of by root. It includes a bibliography, as well as references to the Masoretic Text and the Samaritan Pentateuch, the Vulgate, the Septuagint, the Dead Sea Scrolls, and Ben Sira.

== See also ==
- Comprehensive Aramaic Lexicon
