= Jacqueline Vayntrub =

American Biblical scholar

Jacqueline Vayntrub is an American scholar of Biblical studies and an associate professor of the Hebrew Bible at Yale Divinity School. Her work addressees biblical poetry and wisdom literature.

== Education and career ==
Vayntrub earned her MA from the Hebrew University of Jerusalem and her PhD from University of Chicago, and before her appointment at Yale, held a postdoctoral fellowship at Harvard University and an assistant professorship at Brandeis University. In 2019–2020, she was a fellow at the Katz Center for Advanced Judaic Studies at the University of Pennsylvania.

Vayntrub founded the Philology in Hebrew Studies program unit at the Society of Biblical Literature, and she is a founding member of Renewed Philology. She has been series editor of The Library of Hebrew Bible/Old Testament Studies, the International Critical Commentary, and an editor of the experimental online journal Metatron.

== Beyond Orality ==
Her 2019 book Beyond Orality: Biblical Poetry on its Own Terms addressed "how the Hebrew Bible holistically theorizes its own textuality." In a review for Studies in Religion, Mark Leuchter praised the book as "a masterclass in the metacriticism of the field of biblical studies."

Andrew Tobolowsky, writing for the Ancient Jew Review, described the book as "a timely and incisive contribution"

== Bibliography ==
- Beyond Orality: Biblical Poetry on its Own Terms (Routledge, 2019)
- Philology and Gender. Hebrew Bible and Ancient Israel 8/4 (2019). Co-edited with Laura Quick and Ingrid Lilly.
- “Biblical Hebrew šninɔ: a ‘Cautionary Tale’ of Root Identification.” Co-authored with H. H. Hardy II. Vetus Testamentum 64/2 (2014): 279-283.
- “‘Observe due measure’: The Gezer Inscription and Dividing a Trip around the Sun,” 187-203 in Epigraphy, Philology, and the Hebrew Bible: Methodological Perspectives on the Comparative Study of the Hebrew Bible in Honor of Jo Ann Hackett, ed. Jeremy Hutton and Aaron Rubin. Ancient Near Eastern Monographs Series. Atlanta: Society of Biblical Literature, 2015.
- “The Book of Proverbs and the Idea of Ancient Israelite Education.” Zeitschrift für die alttestamentliche Wissenschaft 128/1 (2016): 96–114. Honorable mention, Luckens International Prize in Jewish Thought and Culture, 2015.
- “‘To take up a parable’: The History of Translating a Biblical Idiom.” Vetus Testamentum 66/4 (2016): 627-645.
- “Before Authorship: Solomon in Prov. 1:1.” Biblical Interpretation 26 (2018): 182–206.
- “Voice and Presence in the Genesis Apocryphon.” A Genius for Mentorship: A Forum in Honor of Ben Wright on his 65th Birthday. Ancient Jew Review, January 2018.
- “Gender and Philology's Uncommon Sense.” Co-authored with Laura Quick and Ingrid Lilly. Hebrew Bible and Ancient Israel 8/4 (2019): 379–387.
- “Like Father, Like Son: Theorizing Transmission in Biblical and Ancient Near Eastern Literature.” Hebrew Bible and Ancient Israel 7/4 (2018): 500–526.
- “The Age of the Bible and Ancient Near East: Intellectual Developments and Highlights,” 30–38 in The Routledge Handbook of Jewish History and Historiography, ed. Dean Phillip Bell (London: Routledge, 2018).
- “Mashal (Proverb),” 1258–1260 in Encyclopedia of Biblical Reception (EBR). Vol. 17: Lotus-Masrekah, ed. Christine Helmer et al. (Berlin: De Gruyter, 2019)
- “Tamar and her Botanical Image.” Journal of Biblical Literature 139/2 (2020): 301–318.
- “Tyre's Glory and Demise: Totalizing Description in Ezekiel 27.” Catholic Bible Quarterly 82/2 (2020): 214–236.
- “Beauty, Wisdom, and Handiwork in Prov 31:10-31.” Harvard Theological Review 113/1 (2020): 45–62.
- “Ecclesiastes and the Problem of Transmission in Biblical Literature,” in Writing and Scribalism: Authors, Audiences, and Texts in Social Perspective, ed. Mark Leuchter. T&T Clark 2020.
- “Proverbs,” 11–29 in Wiley Blackwell Companion to Wisdom Literature, ed. Samuel Adams and Matthew Goff. Wiley-Blackwell, 2020.
- “Wisdom in Transmission: Rethinking Proverbs and Sirach,” in Sirach and its Contexts: The Pursuit of Wisdom and Human Flourishing, ed. Gregory Goering, Matthew Goff, and Samuel Adams. Journal for the Study of Judaism Supplements (Leiden: Brill, 2021).
- “Ancient Hebrew Literature,” in How Literatures Begin, ed. Denis Feeney and Joel Lande. Princeton: Princeton University Press, 2021.
- “Advice: Wisdom, Skill, and Success,” in The Oxford Handbook of Wisdom and The Bible, ed. Will Kynes. Oxford: Oxford University Press, 2021.
