= Ezra Palmer Gould =

American biblical scholar (1841–1900)

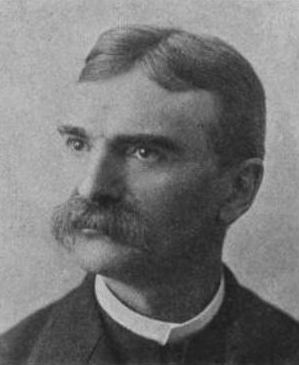
- Born: February 27, 1841; Boston, Massachusetts
- Died: August 22, 1900 (aged 59); White Lake, New York
- Burial place: Mount Auburn Cemetery
- Education: Harvard University; Newton Theological Institution
- Occupation: Clergyman
- Spouse: Jenny M. Stone (m. 1868)
- Children: 2

Ezra Palmer Gould (February 27, 1841 – August 22, 1900) was a Baptist and later, Episcopal, minister. He graduated Harvard University in 1861 and subsequently served in the American Civil War. He entered the ministry in 1868. His commentary on the Gospel of Mark continued to be reprinted in the International Critical Commentary series.

== Early life, family, and education ==
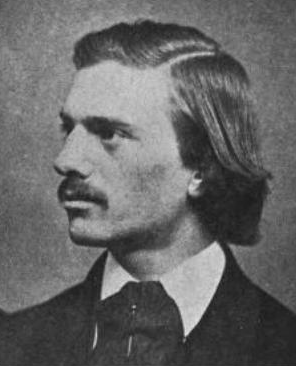
At Harvard, c. 1861

Ezra Palmer Gould was born in Boston, Massachusetts, on February 27, 1841, to S. L. Gould and Frances Ann Shelton Gould. He attended Harvard University, graduating in 1861, and was a member of Phi Beta Kappa. He was married September 1, 1868, to Jenny M. Stone, and had two children, Herbert Shelton and Edith Parker.

== Military service ==
Shortly after his graduation, he enlisted as a private in the 24th Regiment Massachusetts Volunteer Infantry, and was soon promoted to the rank of corporal. His regiment participated in the Battle of New Bern, and was stationed near that community for nine months. During this time, he received news of his brother's death at Antietam. He was then commissioned as second lieutenant of the 55th Massachusetts Volunteers on October 15, 1863, and subsequently commissioned as a captain with the 59th Massachusetts Volunteers. While serving as a captain in the 59th Massachusetts during the Battle of the Wilderness, he was wounded in the left arm and hand, and ultimately lost the little finger on that hand.

== Seminary education and work ==
Upon leaving his military service in 1865, he entered Newton Theological Institution, a Baptist seminary, graduating three years later, and immediately becoming professor of New Testament Literature and Interpretation, a position which he held until 1882. That year, he was "unseated" from his faculty position as his "theological views had become unsatisfactory." His dismissal was considered "a theological sensation in 1883."

In 1889, he assumed a similar position at the Protestant Episcopal Divinity School in Philadelphia, which he held for nine years, and was ordained into the Episcopal priesthood on February 18, 1891.

He died in White Lake, Sullivan County, New York, on August 22, 1900, and was buried at Mount Auburn Cemetery in Cambridge.

== Pastorates ==
- Old Cambridge Baptist Church – 1868–?
- Berean Baptist Church (Burlington, Virginia) – 1884–1888
- St. George's Episcopal Church, New York – 1898–1900

== Publications ==
=== Books ===
- Gould, Ezra Palmer (1887). Commentary on the Epistles to the Corinthians. American commentary on the New Testament. Vol. 5. Philadelphia, PA: American Baptist Publication Society. OCLC 4013243.
- ——— (1896). A Critical and Exegetical Commentary on the Gospel according to St. Mark. International Critical Commentary on the Holy Scriptures of the Old and New Testaments. Vol. 27. New York: Charles Scribner's Sons. ISBN 9780837033532. OCLC 950442.
- ——— (1900). The Biblical Theology of the New Testament. New Testament handbooks. New York & London: Macmillan. OCLC 8989053.
- ——— (1897). The Modification of Christianity by its Contact with the World. Publications of the Church Social Union. Vol. 34. Boston, MA: Church Social Union (U.S.) Office of the Secretary. OCLC 20139998.

=== Journal articles ===
- ——— (July 1874). "Notes on John 17". Baptist Quarterly.
- ——— (January 1875). "New Testament Use of σάρξ, Flesh". Bibliotheca Sacra.
- ——— (June 1877). "Doctrinal Contents of Christ's Teachings in the Synoptical Gospels". Baptist Quarterly.
- ——— (October 1878). "Doctrine of the Epistle of James". Bibliotheca Sacra.
- ——— (July 1880). "Paul's Doctrine of Sin". Baptist Review.
- ——— (1881). "Note on I Corinthians 7:15". Journal of the Society of Biblical Literature and Exegesis.
- ——— (1883). "Christianity in Business". Proceedings of Baptist Autumnal Conference.
- ——— (1883). "Romans 9-11". Journal of the Society of Biblical Literature and Exegesis.
- ——— (1883). "Matthew 12:43-45". Journal of the Society of Biblical Literature and Exegesis.
- ——— (January 1888). "The True Church". Andover Review.
- ——— (1889). "Defects of the Congregational Polity". Andover Review.
- ——— (August–September 1890). "Literary Character of St. Paul's Letters". Old and New Testament Student.
- ——— (1890). "Positive Gains of the Higher Criticism". Church Congress Papers.
- ——— (1891). "The Evils of Division". Church Unity Society.
- ——— (1892). "Anomalies of the New Testament literature". Journal of Biblical Literature.
- ——— (1899). "St. Paul and the Twelve". Journal of Biblical Literature.
- ——— (September–October 1899). "The New Testament Alexandrians". Methodist Review.
- ——— (1900). "The Alexandrian Gospel". Journal of Biblical Literature.
