= The Expository Times =

- Discipline: Religious studies
- Language: English
- Edited by: Paul Foster, John Riches.

Publication details
- History: October, 1889–present
- Publisher: SAGE Publications (United Kingdom)
- Frequency: Monthly

Standard abbreviations
- ISO 4: Expo. Times

Indexing
- ISSN: 0014-5246 (print); 1745-5308 (web)

Links
- Journal homepage; Online access

The Expository Times is a long-established academic journal of biblical studies, theology, and ministry established in 1889 by the Scottish theologian James Hastings. The journal is abstracted and indexed in the ATLA Religion Database, New Testament Abstracts and the Arts and Humanities Citation Index. Dr. Guy Bennett-Hunter was the Executive Editor from 2014 until 2025.

== Scope ==
The Expository Times aims to combine an interest in all pastoral matters, practical and theoretical with the latest international scholarship in religious studies, biblical studies and philosophy. The journal contains resources for the month for those conducting worship: a sermon by a preacher of distinction, exegetical notes and other resources.

== Abstracting and indexing ==
The Expository Times is abstracted and indexed in the following databases:

- Arts and Humanities Citation Index
- ATLA Religion Database
- New Testament Abstracts
- SCOPUS
