= Brown–Driver–Briggs =

Reference for Biblical Hebrew and Biblical Aramaic

A Hebrew and English Lexicon of the Old Testament
- Impression of 1939
- Author: Francis Brown, Samuel Rolles Driver, Charles Augustus Briggs
- Language: English
- Subject: Biblical Hebrew
- Genre: Reference
- Publication date: 1906
- Publication place: England
- Pages: 1185
- ISBN: 1-56563-206-0
- OCLC: 13518063
- Text: A Hebrew and English Lexicon of the Old Testament at Wikisource

A Hebrew and English Lexicon of the Old Testament, more commonly known as Brown–Driver–Briggs or BDB (from the name of its three authors) is a standard reference for Biblical Hebrew and Biblical Aramaic, first published in 1906. It is organized by (Hebrew) alphabetical order of three letter roots.

BDB was based on the Hebrew-German lexicon of Wilhelm Gesenius, translated by Edward Robinson. The chief editor was Francis Brown, with the co-operation of Samuel Rolles Driver and Charles Augustus Briggs, hence the name Brown–Driver–Briggs. Some modern editions have added the Strong's reference numbers for Biblical Hebrew and Aramaic words.

In 2013, semitists Jo Ann Hackett and John Huehnergard received a National Endowment for the Humanities grant to fund the creation of a revised and updated electronic version of the BDB; the resulting Biblical Hebrew and Aramaic Lexicon will be available through a website (Semitica Electronica) or via print-on-demand.

== See also ==
- Hebrew and Aramaic Lexicon of the Old Testament
- New American Standard Bible (NASB).
