= James Hastings =

British minister and scholar (1852–1922)

The Reverend James Hastings
- Church: United Free Church of Scotland

Orders
- Ordination: 1884

Personal details
- Born: 26 February 1852 Huntly, Aberdeenshire, Scotland
- Died: 15 October 1922 (aged 70) Aberdeen, Aberdeenshire, Scotland

James Hastings (26 March 1852 – 15 October 1922) was a Scottish United Free Church minister and biblical scholar. He is best known for producing major reference works, including a 5-volume Dictionary of the Bible and a 13-volume Encyclopædia of Religion and Ethics, and establishing The Expository Times.

== Life ==
Letter by James Hastings (1905)

He was born in Huntly, Aberdeenshire, the second son and fifth child of local miller James Hastings. His initial education was undertaken at Huntly School and Aberdeen Grammar School. He studied classics at the University of Aberdeen, graduating with a Master's degree in 1876. He then attended the Free Church Divinity College in Aberdeen in preparation for ordination as a Free Church minister. While studying at the college, he also worked as a teacher at Chanonry House School, a private school for boys in Old Aberdeen.

Following a period as assistant minister in Broughty Ferry, Dundee, Hastings was ordained in 1884, becoming minister at Kineff Free Church in Kincardineshire. After 13 years, he was called to Willison Church in Dundee, but returned to Kincardineshire in 1901, having struggled with his city placement. From 1901 until his retirement in 1911, he was the minister at the United Free Church in St Cyrus. During his period in office, he oversaw the erection of a new church building for the congregation.

In one obituary, his preaching was described as "evangelical in sentiment, thoughtful and expository in style, fluent in delivery, and fervent in application."

Hastings married Ann Wilson Forsyth in 1884, the year of his ordination. They had two children: Edward (21 March 1890 – 1 August 1980) and Ann Wilson (21 April 1885 – 23 March 1975). Edward later also became a minister of the United Free Church.

He received honorary Doctor of Divinity degrees from the University of Aberdeen (1897) and Queen's University in Nova Scotia (1920).

After his retirement, Hastings returned to Aberdeen, where he became a member of Beechgrove United Free Church. He died unexpectedly on 15 October 1922. His funeral was held on 18 October, and he was buried at Springbank Cemetery in Aberdeen.

== Works ==
Hastings edited many reference works, which are still in use today. In 1913, he was awarded the biennial Dyke-Acland Medal for his services to biblical research.

During his time at Willison church, Hastings founded the Expository Times, which he edited until his death. After his death, his children took over joint editorship of the journal until 1942, when C. Leslie Mitton became editor. The Expository Times continues to be issued monthly.

He also established and edited a weekly periodical for Sunday School teachers, entitled The Sunday School. This ran for 104 editions between December 1892 and December 1894.

== Bibliography ==
Volume 4 of the Hastings Encyclopedia of Religion and Ethics

=== As editor ===
- Dictionary of the Bible, (T. & T. Clark, 1898–1904), five volumes
- Dictionary of Christ and the Gospels, (T. & T. Clarke, 1906-1908), two volumes, later editions with John A. Selbie and John C. Lambert
- Encyclopaedia of Religion and Ethics, (T. & T. Clarke, 1908–26; 2nd edition 1925–1940, reprint 1955), 13 volumes
- Dictionary of the Apostolic Church, (T. & T. Clark, 1915-1918), 2 volumes
- The Great Texts of the Bible, (T. & T. Clark, 1910–1915, reprint 1958), 21 volumes
- The Speaker's Bible, (Aberdeen: "The Speaker's Bible" Offices, 1923-1951), 13 volumes

=== As author ===
- The Greater Men and Women of the Bible, six volumes (T. & T. Clark, 1913–1916)
- The Christian Doctrine of Prayer (T. & T. Clark, 1915)
- The Christian Doctrine of Faith (T. & T. Clark, 1919)
- The Christian Doctrine of Peace (T. & T. Clark, 1922)
