= T&T Clark =

British publishing firm

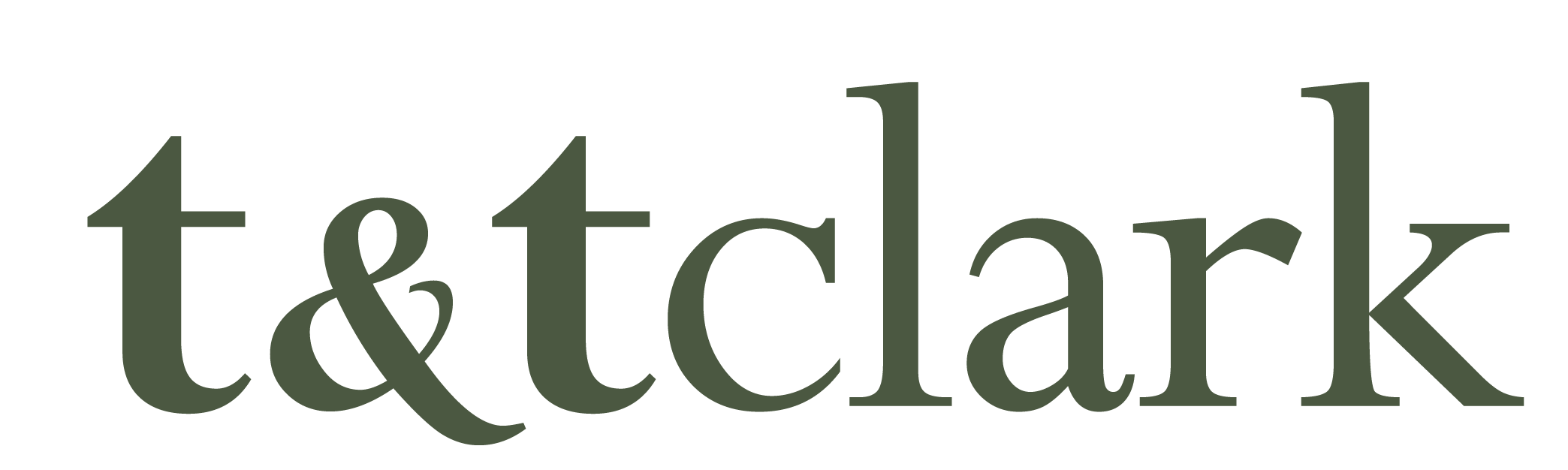
- Parent company: Bloomsbury Publishing
- Founded: 1821; 205 years ago (in Edinburgh, Scotland, United Kingdom)
- Founder: Thomas Clark
- Defunct: 2011
- Country of origin: United Kingdom
- Headquarters location: London, WC1
- Publication types: Academic journals, books
- Nonfiction topics: Religion
- Official website: bloomsbury.com/tt-clark

T&T Clark is a British publishing firm which was founded in Edinburgh, Scotland, in 1821 and which now exists as an imprint of Bloomsbury Publishing.

== History ==
The firm was founded in 1821 by Thomas Clark, then aged 22 and who had a Free Church of Scotland background. The company was originally concerned with law and foreign literature and published under the name of "Thomas Clark."

He was joined in a partnership in 1846 by his nephew, also named Thomas Clark. With the arrival of younger Thomas Clark (1823-1900) the firm began issuing works under the name of "T. & T. Clark."

In the 1830s, it began to develop a theology list, taking a progressive evangelical stance and at times, publishing books that were not likely to make a profit. It published work by scholars in both Europe and North America. Its most substantial projects were the English translation of the Ante-Nicene Fathers (which the firm titled Ante-Nicene Christian Library) and the Encyclopaedia of Religion and Ethics. These were only viable because of the existence of a large American market; however, in the 1880s the firm got into a dispute with the Fleming H. Revell Company, over the American firm's copyright violation of some of T&T Clark's titles. The Ante-Nicene Library was bootlegged by the Christian Literature Publishing Company, based in New York City, New York. However, this did not prevent T&T Clark from doing business with them.

In 1965, the company began to publish Concilium, an academic journal of Roman Catholic theology.

In 2003, the three religious academic imprints of Sheffield Academic Press, Trinity Press International and T&T Clark were all acquired by the Continuum International Publishing Group, which itself was acquired by Bloomsbury Publishing in 2011.

== Reference works ==
Each of the following four works was edited by James Hastings

- Dictionary of the Bible, (1898–1904), 5 vols.
- Encyclopaedia of Religion and Ethics, (1908–1926; 2nd edition 1925–1940, reprint 1955), 13 vols.
- The Great Texts of the Bible, (1910–1915), 20 vols.
- The Greater Men and Women of the Bible, (1913–1916), 6 vols.

== Book series ==
- Ante-Nicene Christian Library (ANCL), (1867–72), 24 vols. (Rev. Alexander Roberts and James Donaldson, eds.)
- Bible Class Primers (S. D. F. Salmond, ed.)
- The Biblical Cabinet or, Hermeneutical, Exegetical and Philological Library
- Cases Decided in the Court of Session, Court of Justiciary, and House of Lords
- Clark's Foreign Theological Library (1845- )
- Cunningham Lectures
- Handbooks for Bible Classes Series (Alexander Whyte and Marcus Dodds, eds.)
- International Critical Commentary
- International Theological Library
- Literature of the New Testament
- Meyer's Critical and Exegetical Commentary on the New Testament
- A Select Library of the Nicene and Post-Nicene Fathers of the Christian Church, usually known as the Nicene and Post-Nicene Fathers (NPNF), (1886–1900)
- The Scholar as Teacher Series
- T&T Clark Study Guides to the New Testament (2017- )
- Works of John Calvin
- Works of Saint Augustine, 15 vols (Marcus Dods, ed.)
- The World's Epoch-Makers (Oliphant Smeaton, ed.)

== See also ==
- Culture of London
- Literature of England
- Literature of Scotland
