= Samuel Gilman Brown =

American educator

Samuel Gilman Brown (1813–1885) was an American educator. He was born in North Yarmouth, Maine, the son of Francis Brown, president of Dartmouth College. Brown graduated from Dartmouth College in 1831 and from Andover Theological Seminary in 1837. He was principal of Abbot Academy for girls, 1835–1838. He was professor of oratory and belles-lettres in Dartmouth from 1840 to 1863, and held the chair of intellectual philosophy and political economy from 1863 to 1867. From 1867 to 1881 he was president of Hamilton College. Among his published works are Biographies of Self-Taught Men (1847) and an excellent and authoritative Life of Rufus Choate (two volumes, 1862).

He was the father of the theologian Francis Brown.

== Publications ==
- Memorial of Samuel Gilman Brown (New York, 1885)
