= Henry Usher Hall =

American anthropologist (1876–1944)

- Born: 1876
- Died: 1944 (aged 67–68); Philadelphia
- Occupation: Anthropologist

Henry Usher Hall (1876 – November 2, 1944) was an American anthropologist.

He was Assistant Curator and Curator of the General Ethnology Section of the University of Pennsylvania Museum from 1915 to 1935. He was instrumental in guiding the Museum's African collection in its early years.

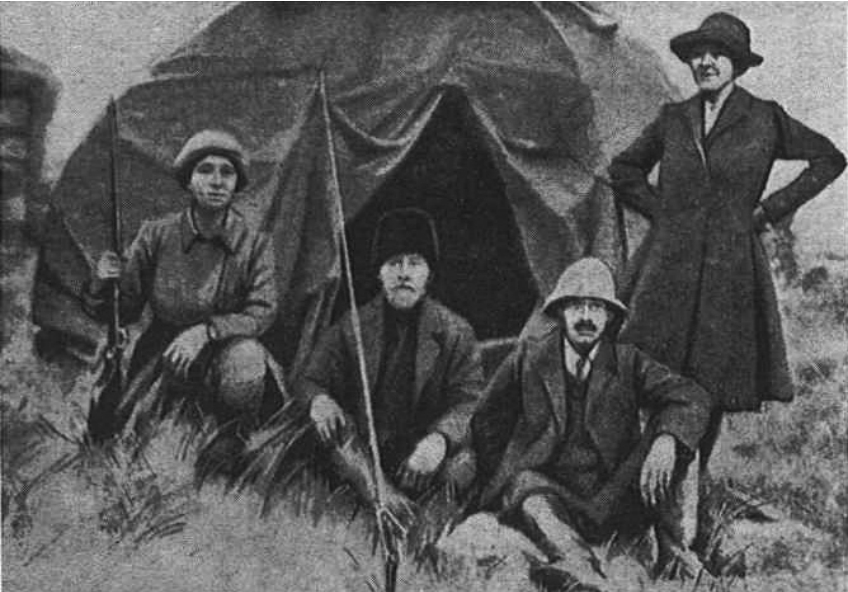
Left to right, Maud Haviland, Vasily Korobeinikov, Henry Hall, Dora Curtis in 1914

He accompanied Polish anthropologist Maria Antonina Czaplicka (1886-1921) on an expedition down the Yenisei River in Siberia to the Kara Sea in 1914, together with Maud Doria Haviland (1889–1941), ornithologist, and Dora Curtis, artist.

From 1915 to 1935, Hall served as Assistant Curator and later Curator of the General Ethnology Section at the Penn Museum, where he played a key role in establishing its African collections.

Hall married the artist Frances Devereux Jones Hall (1872–1941) on 20 June 1921 in Philadelphia, Pennsylvania. She died in 1941 and they had no children.

He conducted excavations in the Dordogne in 1923, and in 1936–1937 he led an expedition to Sierra Leone, where he investigated the Sherbro people. On his return from Sierra Leone, he published The Sherbro of Sierra Leone (1938), which included an account of the secret Poro society of the Sherbro men.

Hall died in 1944 at the U.S. Naval hospital in Philadelphia.
