= Encyclopædia of Religion and Ethics =

1908–1927 12-volume encyclopedia

- Editor: James Hastings; assisted by John A. Selbie and Louis H. Gray
- Language: English
- Subject: Religion, Ethics, Folklore, Mythology, Ritual, Anthropology, Psychology
- Genre: Encyclopedia, Reference work
- Publisher: T. & T. Clark (Edinburgh); Charles Scribner’s Sons (New York)
- Publication date: 1908–1926 (Volumes 1–12), Index volume c.1927
- Publication place: United Kingdom / United States
- Media type: Print (13 volumes)
- Pages: Over 10,000 pages (approx.)
- OCLC: 705902930
- Followed by: Subsequent reprints and digital editions

The Encyclopaedia of Religion and Ethics is a 12-volume work (plus an index volume) edited by James Hastings, written between 1908 and 1921 and composed of entries by many contributors. It covers not only religious matters but thousands of ancillary topics as well, including folklore, myth, ritual, anthropology, psychology, etc. It was originally published by T&T Clark in Edinburgh, and Charles Scribner's Sons in the United States.

== Volumes ==
1. A — Art
2. Arthur — Bunyan
3. Burial — Confessions
4. Confirmation — Drama
5. Dravidian — Fichte
6. Fiction — Hyksos
7. Hymns — Liberty
8. Life and Death — Mulla
9. Mundas — Phrygians
10. Picts — Sacraments
11. Sacrifice — Sudra
12. Suffering — Zwingli
13. Index

== Sources ==
Several volumes are available from Google Books in "full view" mode. The first few volumes are available from the Internet Archive. It was reprinted by Kessinger Publishing in 2003, divided into 24 volumes without the index. Volume 13 (The Index) is available from Google Books in "limited view" mode and in full from the Internet Archive . Varda Books has also released an online edition (requires registration to view, requires payment to download).
