= Brian Tate =

Robert Brian Tate, FBA, FRHistS (27 December 1921 – 21 February 2011) was a Northern Irish Hispanist and Renaissance scholar. He was the Professor of Hispanic Studies at the University of Nottingham from 1958 to 1983.

== Early life, war service and education ==
Born on 27 December 1921, Tate attended the Royal Belfast Academical Institution before studying modern languages at Queen's University, Belfast. With his education interrupted by service as an officer in the British Army during the Second World War (he served in Southeast Asia), he completed his degree at Belfast in 1948. His tutor Ignasi González i Llubera encouraged him to visit to Barcelona and Girona and he began an association with Spanish scholars including Vicens Vives and Pierre Vilar. Returning to Belfast, he completed a master's degree and then a doctorate, the latter on late-medieval Spanish history-writing.

== Career, research, honours and later life ==
Tate was an assistant lecturer at the University of Manchester from 1949 to 1952. He returned to Queen's University once more to be a lecturer in 1952. In 1956, he moved to the University of Nottingham to take up the Readership in Hispanic Studies. In 1958, he was appointed the Professor of Hispanic Studies there (he was also head of the Department of Hispanic Studies). Tate retired in 1983.

Tate's first book was a biography of Joan Margarit i Pau (1954); he also wrote El Cardenal Joan Margarit, Vida i Obra (1976). His work Ensayos Sobre la Historiografia Peninsular del Siglo XV was published in 1970. With M. Tate he authored The Pilgrim Route to Santiago (1987); he also wrote Pilgrimages to St James of Compostella from the British Isles during the Middle Ages (1990, 2003), and edited (with T. Turville-Petre) Two Pilgrim Itineraries of the Later Middle Ages (1995) and alone Costance Mary Storrs' Jacobean Pilgrims from England to St James of Compostella: From the Early Twelfth to the Late Fifteenth Century (1994). He produced editions of Fernán Pérez de Guzmán's Generaciones y Semblanzas (1965), Fernando del Pulgar's Claros Varones del Castilla (1971), Juan Manuel's Libro de los Estados (1974, edited with I. R. Macpherson), Alfonso de Palencia's Epistolas Latinas (1982, edited with R. Alemany Ferrer) and Palencia's Gesta Hispaniensia: Ex Annalibus Suorum Dierum Collecta (2 vols., 1998–99, edited with J. Lawrence). He also completed a translation of Vilar's Spain: A Brief History (1967). Tate also edited Directo de Príncipes: HSA MS HC: 371/164 (1977) for the Exeter Hispanic Texts series.

A president of the Association of Hispanists and of the Anglo-Catalan Society, Tate was elected a fellow of the British Academy in 1980 and a fellow of the Royal Historical Society in 1990. He was the subject of a Festschrift: Medieval and Renaissance Studies in Honour of Robert Brian Tate, edited by Ian Michael and Richard A. Cardwell (1984). He was also corresponding fellowships of the Real Academia de la Historia, the Institute for Catalan Studies and the Reial Acadèmia de Bones Lletres de Barcelona. He died on 21 February 2011 and was survived by his wife Beth (née Lewis) and their children Caroline and Marcus.
