= Dora Curtis =

American artist (1875–1920)

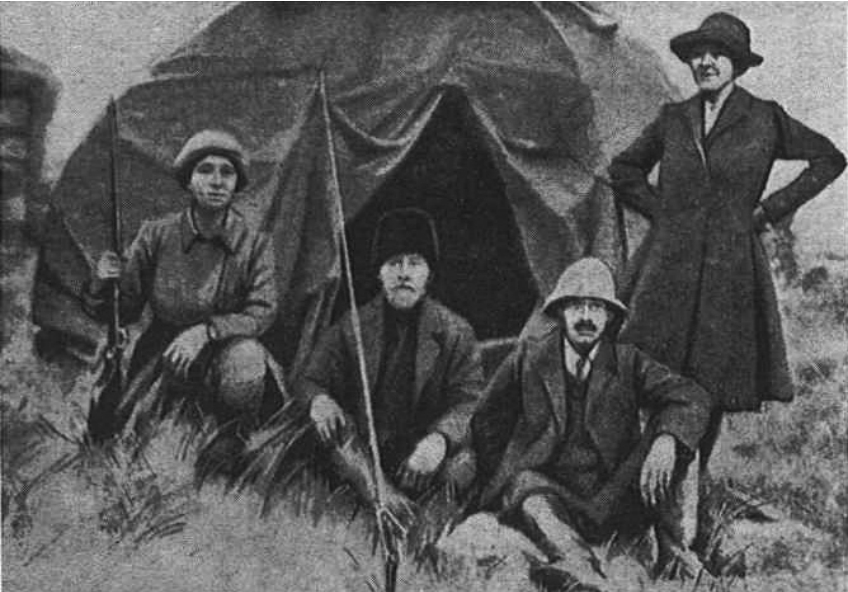
Left to right, Maud Haviland, Vasily Korobeinikov, Henry Hall, Dora Curtis in 1914

Dora Curtis (1875–1920) was a British artist and a member of the 1914 expedition down the Yenisei River in Siberia to the Kara Sea led by Polish anthropologist Maria Antonina Czaplicka (1886–1921). The other expedition members were Maud Doria Haviland (1889–1941) and Henry Usher Hall of the Philadelphia University Museum (1876–1944).

Haviland dedicated her study, Forest Steppe and Tundra, "to the memory of Dora Curtis and the days and nights we spent together in forest, steppe and tundra".

== Early life, education and travels ==
Curtis entered University College London in 1892. She gained a second class degree in Fine Art in 1893 and a £2 prize for figure drawing. She was photographed by Frederick H. Evans in the 1890s.

She travelled to China in 1911.

Her sister Ethel Kibblewhite, was an artist and longtime partner to T.E. Hulme. Together, they hosted an important salon together at 67 Frith Street in their family home. The sculptor Jacob Epstein describes seeing Dora there in his memoirs.

She died in a swimming accident in Las Palmas on 4 July 1920.

== Artwork ==
Curtis illustrated several books including:

Jackanapes: And Other Stories (1899) by Juliana Horatia Ewing

Stories from King Arthur and his Round Table (1905)

Granny's Wonderful Chair by Frances Browne (1906 J.M. Dent edition)

Tales for Children from Many Lands. London: J. M. Dent and Sons; New York: E. P. Dutton and Co., 1913.

Jean Baptiste; a Story of French Canada (1915)(frontispiece)

== Gallery ==
Images from Granny's Wonderful Chair, published 1906.

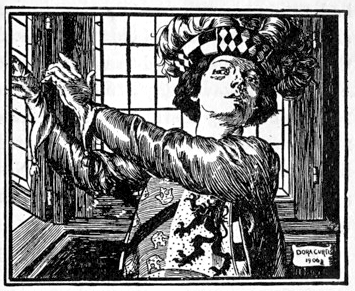
"Tinseltoes throws the doublet out the window"

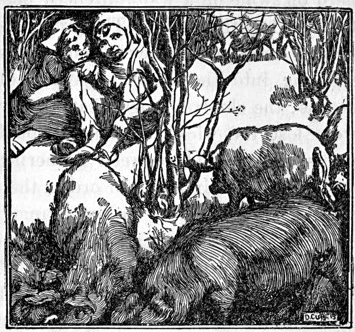
"Woodwender and Loveleaves tend the swine"

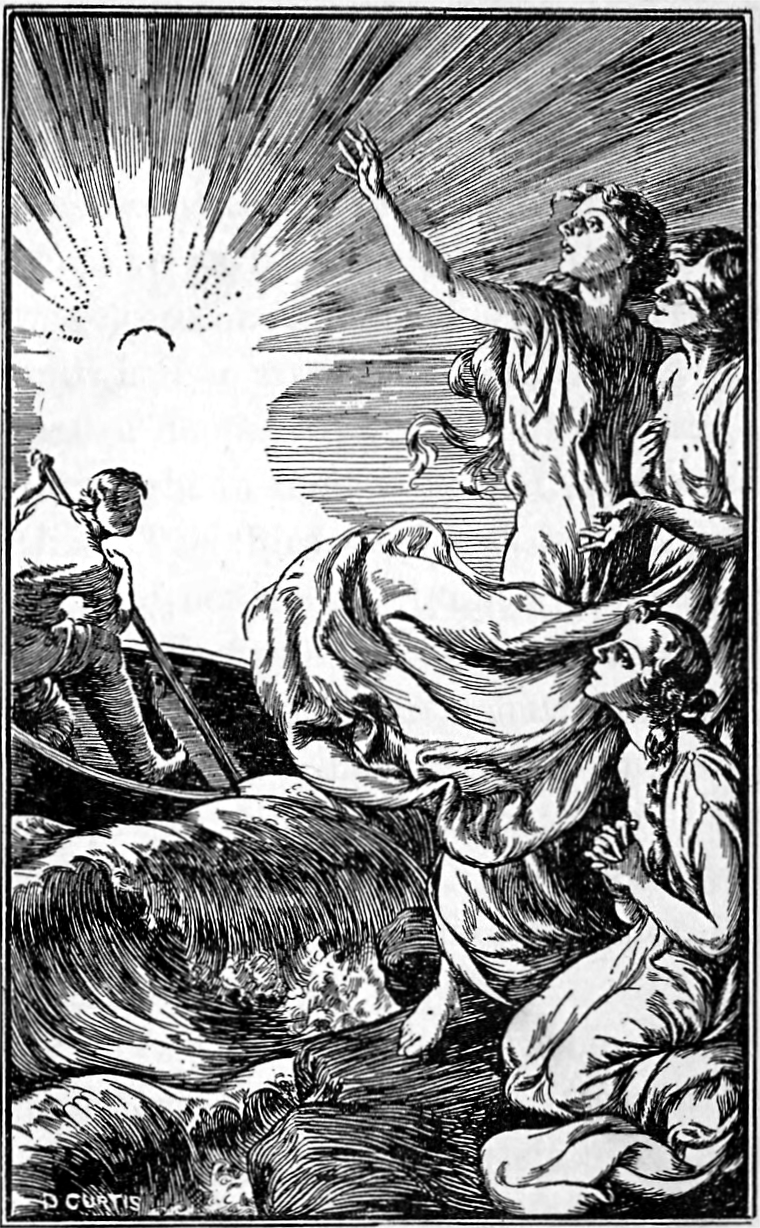
"Civil and the three sea maidens"

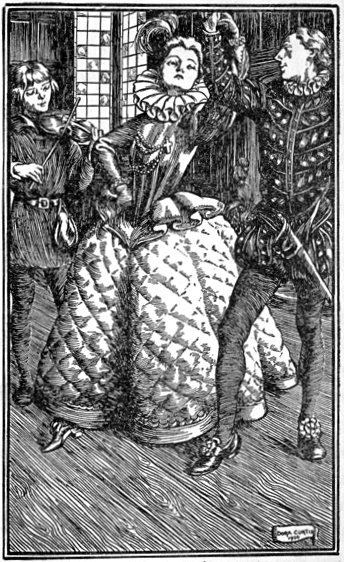
"Dame Dreary dances and grows strong"
