= Geoffrey Rickman =

British ancient historian (1932–2010)

Geoffrey Edwin Rickman, FBA, FRSE (9 October 1932 – 8 February 2010) was a British ancient historian. Professor of Roman History in the University of St Andrews, he wrote a dozen articles on the mechanics of ancient Roman life and two books, Roman Granaries and Store Buildings (CUP 1971) and The Corn Supply of Ancient Rome (Oxford: Clarendon Press 1980).
