= Michael Artis =

British economist

Michael Artis FBA
- Born: 29 June 1938; Croydon, Surrey, England
- Died: 8 January 2016 (aged 77); Knutsford, Cheshire, England
- Spouses: Lilian Gregson (m. 1961, divorced) Shirley Knight (m. 1983)
- Children: 2 daughters plus 1 step-son and 1 step-daughter
- Parents: Cyril John Artis (father); Violet Emily Vincent (mother)

Academic background
- Education: Magdalen College

Academic work
- Discipline: Macroeconomics, monetary economics; Political Economy
- Institutions: Oxford Institute of Statistics; University of Western Australia; University of Adelaide; National Institute for Economic and Social Research; Swansea University; Victoria University of Manchester; European University Institute

Michael John Artis FBA (29 June 1938 – 8 January 2016) was a British economist. A leading macroeconomist, his research encompassed monetary economics, fiscal policies, and European institutions and policies.

== Biography ==
He was educated at Baines Grammar School and Magdalen College, Oxford.

In 1959 Artis joined the Oxford Institute of Statistics and the National Institute for Economic and Social Research in 1967. He joined the Victoria University of Manchester in 1975.

In 1981, he was one of the 364 economists who signed a letter to The Times condemning Geoffrey Howe's 1981 Budget.

In 1995, he joined the European University Institute in Florence, Italy.

== Honours ==
In 1988, he was elected Fellow of the British Academy (FBA).

== Selected publications ==
- Artis, Michael J. (1965). Foundations of British Monetary Policy. New York: Basil Blackwell and Augustus M. Kelley – via Internet Archive.
- Artis, Michael J.; Ostry, Sylvia (1986). International Economic Policy Coordination. London: Routledge and Kegan Paul – via Internet Archive.
- Artis, Michael J.; Nixon, Frederick, eds. (2001). The Economics of the European Union: Policy and Analysis (3rd ed.). Oxford: Oxford University Press – via Internet Archive.
