= Maud Doria Haviland =

English ornithologist (1889–1941)

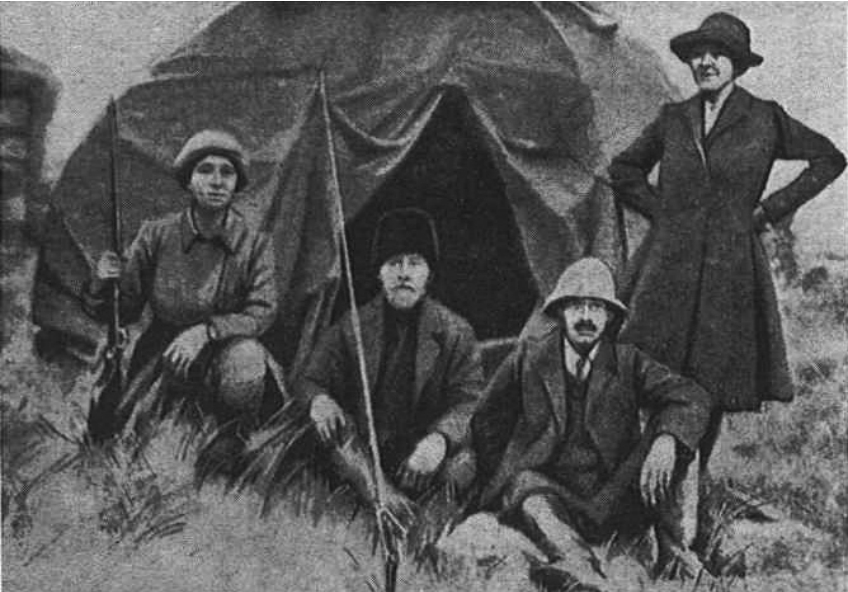
Left to right, Maud Haviland, Vasily Korobeinikov, Henry Hall, Dora Curtis in 1914

Maud Doria Brindley née Haviland (10 February 1889 – 3 April 1941) was an English ornithologist, entomologist, explorer, lecturer, photographer and writer. She conducted studies on bugs and also examined bird biology while at Cambridge and on her travels in Siberia, central Europe, and South America.

== Early life ==
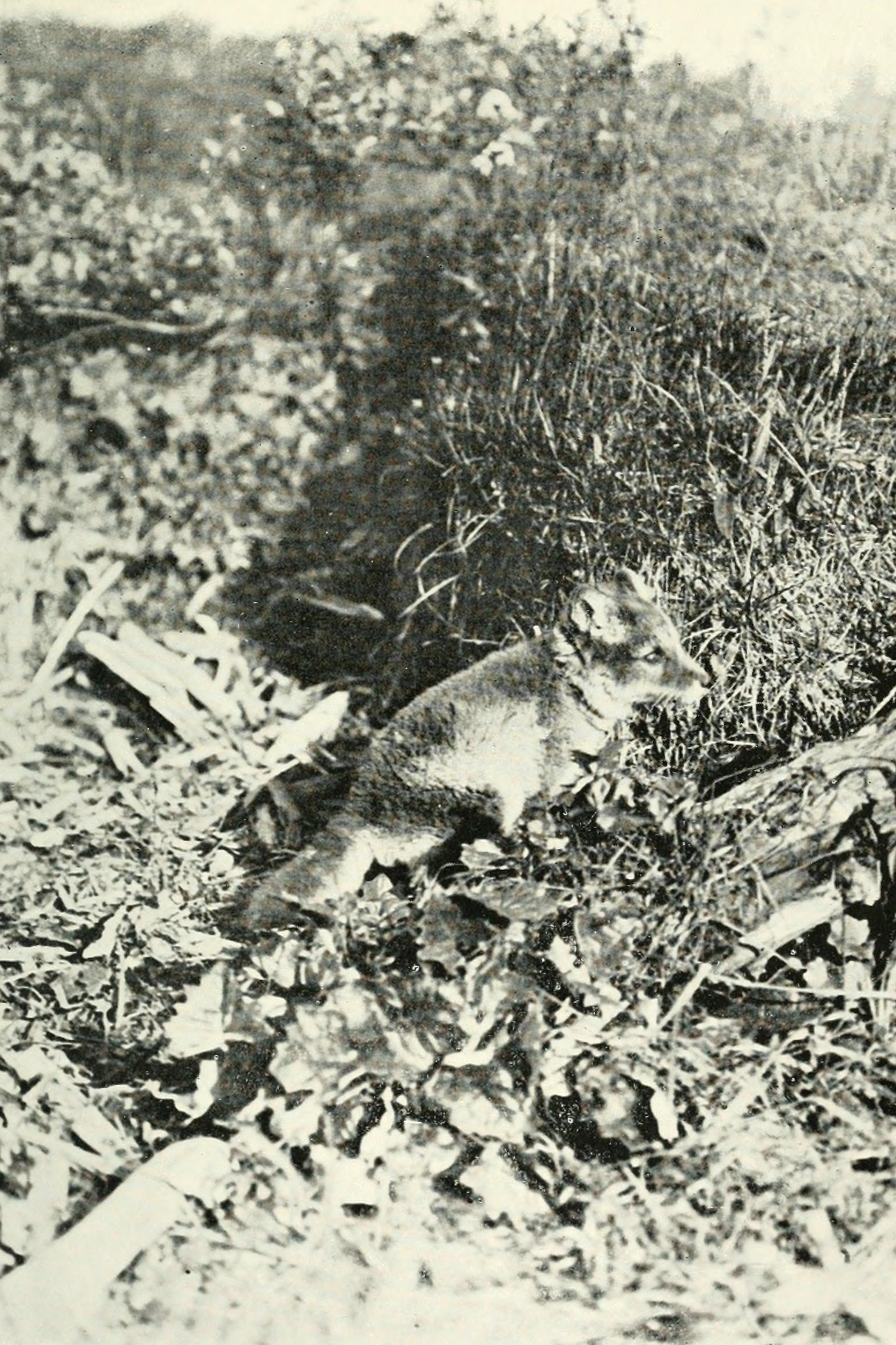
A blue fox documented in A Summer on the Yenesei 1914

Haviland was born in Tamworth, Staffordshire. Her great-grandfather, John Haviland, was a Professor of Anatomy and the first Regius Professor of Physic at the University of Cambridge to give regular courses in pathology and medicine. She spent her youth growing on the estate of her step-father in south-east Ireland where she shot and observed birds in the wild. She learned anatomy and dissection from books. Her earliest natural history books were Wild Life on the Wing (1913) and The Wood People and Others (1914). She also wrote books for children.

== Siberian expedition ==
In 1914 she joined Polish anthropologist Maria Czaplicka on an expedition to Siberia along the Yenesei. Other members of the group included painter Dora Curtis and Henry Usher Hall of the University of Pennsylvania Museum. They travelled overland to Krasnoyarsk, took the trans-Siberian railway and went down the Yenesei in a steamer. En route she was able to observe several are waders and their nests. They returned by the Kara Sea. Returning from the trip she wrote her most popular work, A Summer on the Yenesei. Her work was inspired by Henry Seebohm and his journey in 1877 which was published in Siberia in Asia as well as Notes of birds observed on the Yenesei River, Siberia (1895) by H.L. Popham (1864–1943).

== War work and later life ==
In 1917 she worked with the Scottish Women's Hospital for Foreign Service driving Dr. Elsie Inglis in Romania. In 1918 she worked as a chauffeur for the French Red Cross in the Soissons-Paris region. After the war she joined Newnham College, Cambridge to study zoology. Her main interest was in insects. From 1919 to 1922 she continued to research insects and one of her works was in the examination of factors causing the production of winged morphs in aphids. She noted in an experiment that plants that did not receive magnesium could induce the production of winged forms. She married Harold Hulme Brindley, a fellow of St John's College, Cambridge in 1922 and spent the next year in British Guiana examining bugs. She published on insects and also wrote a paper on river craft in British Guiana. On returning she gave lectures on various Arctic habitats. She was elected to the British Ornithologists' Union in 1916 and was a member of the Cambridge Bird Club. She was also member of the American Ornithologists' Union. She died in Cambridge.

Among her works was a study on foraging of thrushes and the patterning on snails that were captured, critiquing a study that suggested that bands on shells were helpful in concealment.

A bibliography of her writings was published by T. S. Palmer (Treasurer of the American Ornithologists' Union) in 1943.
