= Charles Cranfield =

British theologian, academic, and minister

- Born: Charles Ernest Burland Cranfield; 13 September 1915; Winchmore Hill, North London, England
- Died: 27 February 2015 (aged 99); Durham, England
- Occupations: Theologian, academic, and Christian minister
- Board member of: Fellow of the British Academy
- Spouse: Ruth Bole
- Awards: Burkitt Medal for Biblical Studies

Academic background
- Education: Mill Hill School; Jesus College, Cambridge; Wesley House

Academic work
- Discipline: Biblical studies
- Sub-discipline: New Testament studies
- Institutions: University of Durham
- Notable works: Commentary on Romans

Charles Ernest Burland Cranfield FBA (13 September 1915 – 27 February 2015) was a British theologian, academic, and Christian minister.

== Biography ==
Cranfield was born in Winchmore Hill, London on 13 September 1915 to parents Charles Ernest Cranfield (a town clerk and Methodist preacher) and Beatrice Mary, née Tubbs (an artist). Cranfield attended Mill Hill School and gained a first class degree in classics in 1936 from Jesus College, Cambridge. He went on to study Theology at Wesley House, Cambridge until 1939.

He was ordained as a Methodist minister in 1941, served as a military chaplain during the Second World War, and then worked with prisoners-of-war and as a parish minister during the post-war period. He moved into academia and was appointment a lecturer in theology at the University of Durham in 1950. He was awarded a personal chair as Professor of Theology in 1978, and maintained his links with the university as Emeritus Professor from his retirement in 1980. He moved away from Methodism and became a minister in the Presbyterian Church of England (which later became the United Reformed Church) in 1954.

On 7 April 1953, Cranfield married Ruth Elizabeth Gertrude Bole in Bath. They had twin daughters who both went on to become Church of Scotland ministers. Cranfield died on 27 February 2015 as a result of pneumonia and was buried at South Road Cemetery.

== Honours ==
Cranfield received an honorary Doctor of Letters from the University of Aberdeen in 1980. In 1982, Cranfield was elected a Fellow of the British Academy (FBA), the United Kingdom's national academy for the humanities and social sciences. He was awarded the 1989 Burkitt Medal for Biblical Studies by the British Academy.

== Works ==
- Cranfield, Charles E. B. (1950). The First Epistle of Peter. London: SCM Press. OCLC 3087616.
- ——— (1959). The Gospel according to Saint Mark: an introduction and commentary. Cambridge Greek testament commentary. Cambridge: Cambridge University Press. OCLC 378578.
- ——— (1960). I & II Peter and Jude: introduction and commentary. Torch Bible commentaries. London: SCM Press. OCLC 635843.
- ——— (1962). The Christian's Political Responsibility According to the New Testament. Edinburgh: Oliver and Boyd. OCLC 603616627.
- ——— (1965). The Service of God. London: Epworth Press. OCLC 4058767.
- ——— (1975). A Critical and Exegetical Commentary on the Epistle to the Romans I-VIII. International critical commentary on the Holy Scriptures of the Old and New Testaments (ICC). Vol. 28. Edinburgh: T & T Clark. ISBN 9780567050403. OCLC 1843858.
- ——— (1979). A Critical and Exegetical Commentary on the Epistle to the Romans IX-XVI and essays. International critical commentary on the Holy Scriptures of the Old and New Testaments (ICC). Vol. 28. Edinburgh: T & T Clark. ISBN 9780567050410. OCLC 1843858.
- ——— (1985). If God be For Us: a collection of sermons. Edinburgh: T & T Clark. ISBN 9780567291264. OCLC 12505549.
- ——— (1985). The Bible and Christian Life: a collection of essays. Edinburgh: T & T Clark. ISBN 9780567291257. OCLC 14002303.
- ——— (1993). The Apostles' Creed: a faith to live by. Edinburgh: T & T Clark. ISBN 9780567292278. OCLC 29974865.
