= Roy Hodson =

British archaeologist (1930–2026)

Frank Roy Hodson, FBA (1930 – 27 July 2026) was a British archaeologist. He was Professor of Prehistoric Archaeology at the Institute of Archaeology at University College London from 1973 to 1993.

== Life and career ==
Born in Liverpool in 1930, he attended the University of Cambridge, graduating in 1953 with a classics degree; he then completed the Diploma in Prehistoric Archaeology at the University of Cambridge (1954) and a PhD (1957). In 1958, he supervised Mortimer Wheeler's Charsada excavations and then was appointed Lecturer in Prehistoric Archaeology at the Institute the Archaeology in 1959. He succeeded John D. Evans as the institute's Professor of Prehistoric Archaeology in 1973, retiring in 1993. His work involved the early application of computing to archaeological research.

Hodson died on 27 July 2026, aged 95.

== Honours and awards ==
In 1984, Hodson was elected a Fellow of the British Academy, the United Kingdom's national academy for the humanities and social sciences.
