= William McKane =

Biblical scholar (1921–2004)

William McKane, FBA, FRSE (21 February 1921 – 4 September 2004) was a Scottish Hebraist, Old Testament scholar and Church of Scotland minister. He was the Professor of Hebrew and Oriental Languages at the University of St Andrews from 1968 to 1990.

== Early life and education ==
Born in Dundee on 21 February 1921, McKane attended Stobswell School and then work in a clerical position at a jute processing firm. He decided to become a minister in the Original Secession Church. After service in the RAF during the Second World War, he matriculated at the University of St Andrews in 1946. He studied English and philosophy while also studying for the priesthood (he was ordained in 1949 and entered the Church of Scotland seven years later). After graduating, he studied Semitic languages at the University of Glasgow, completing that degree in 1952. He then carried out doctoral studies, earning a PhD in 1956.

== Career, research, honours and retirement ==
In 1953, McKane was appointed an assistant in Hebrew at the University of Glasgow. Three years later, he was promoted to a lectureship and in 1965 he was made a senior lecturer. In 1968, he moved to the University of St Andrews to be the Professor of Hebrew and Oriental Languages. While there, he served as dean of the Faculty of Divinity from 1973 to 1977 and as the principal of St Mary's College from 1982 to 1986. He retired in 1990.

McKane was the author of Prophets and Wise Men (1965), I and II Samuel (1966), Proverbs: A New Approach (1970), Studies in the Patriarchal Narratives (1979), A Critical and Exegetical Commentary on Jeremiah (2 vols., 1986 and 1996), Selected Christian Hebraists (1989), A Late Harvest (1995), Michah: Introduction and Commentary (1998).

== Honours and awards ==
He was elected a Fellow of the British Academy (FBA) in 1980 and a Fellow of the Royal Society of Edinburgh (FRSE) in 1984. He received the Burkitt Medal from the British Academy (1985), and the DLitt degree from Glasgow (1980). In 1984 he received an honorary degree from the University of Glasgow.

== Death ==
McKane died on 4 September 2004, leaving a widow and five children. He was the last surviving Original Succession Church minister, and the only one living into the 21st century. Robert Robertson had been the only other minister living into the 1990's, dying in 1992.
