= Samuel Rolles Driver =

British academic

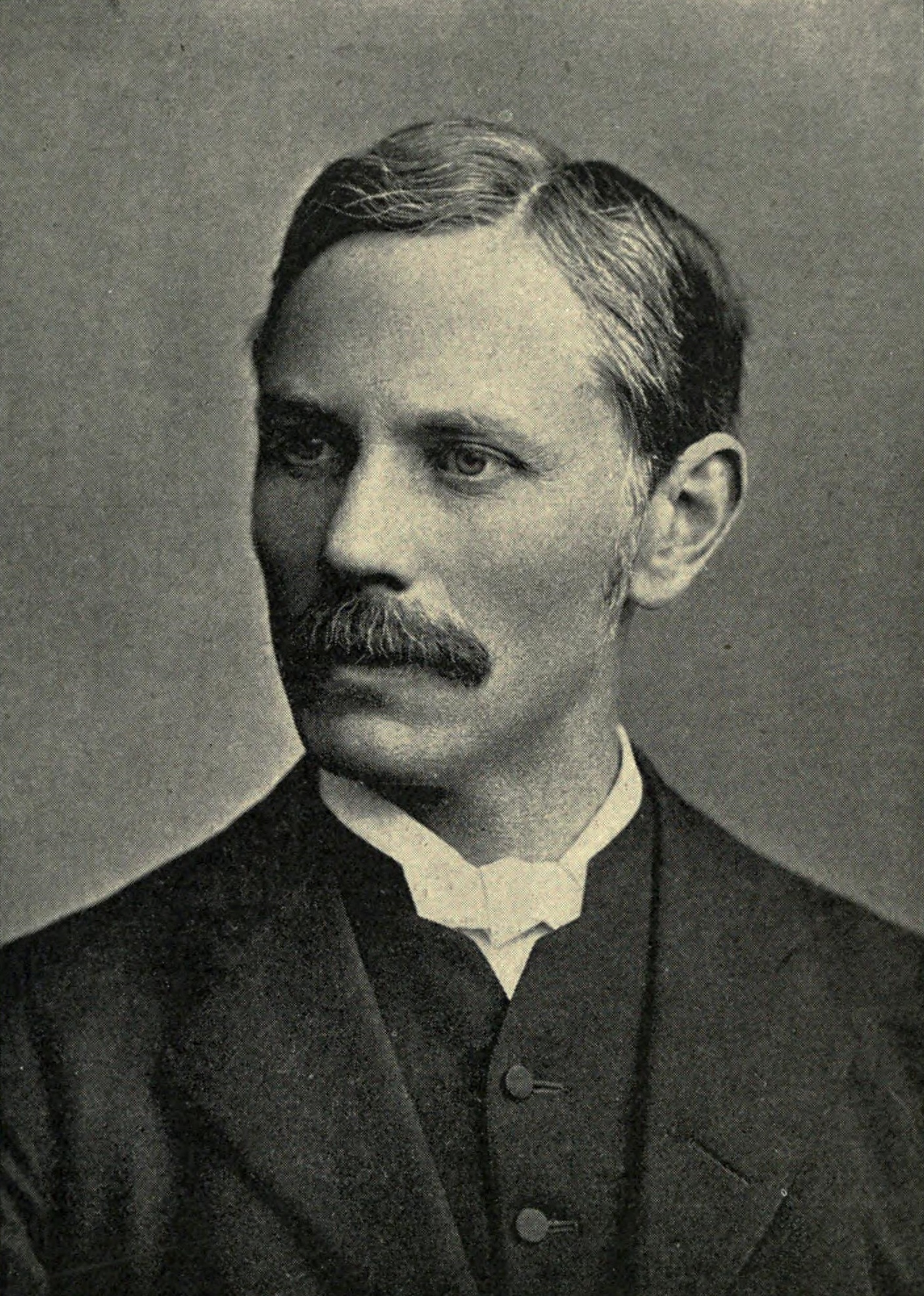
S. R. Driver, by Werner & Son

Samuel Rolles Driver FBA (2 October 1846 – 26 February 1914) was an English divine and Hebrew scholar. He devoted his life to the study, both textual and critical, of the Old Testament. He was the father of Sir Godfrey Rolles Driver, also a distinguished biblical scholar.

== Biography ==
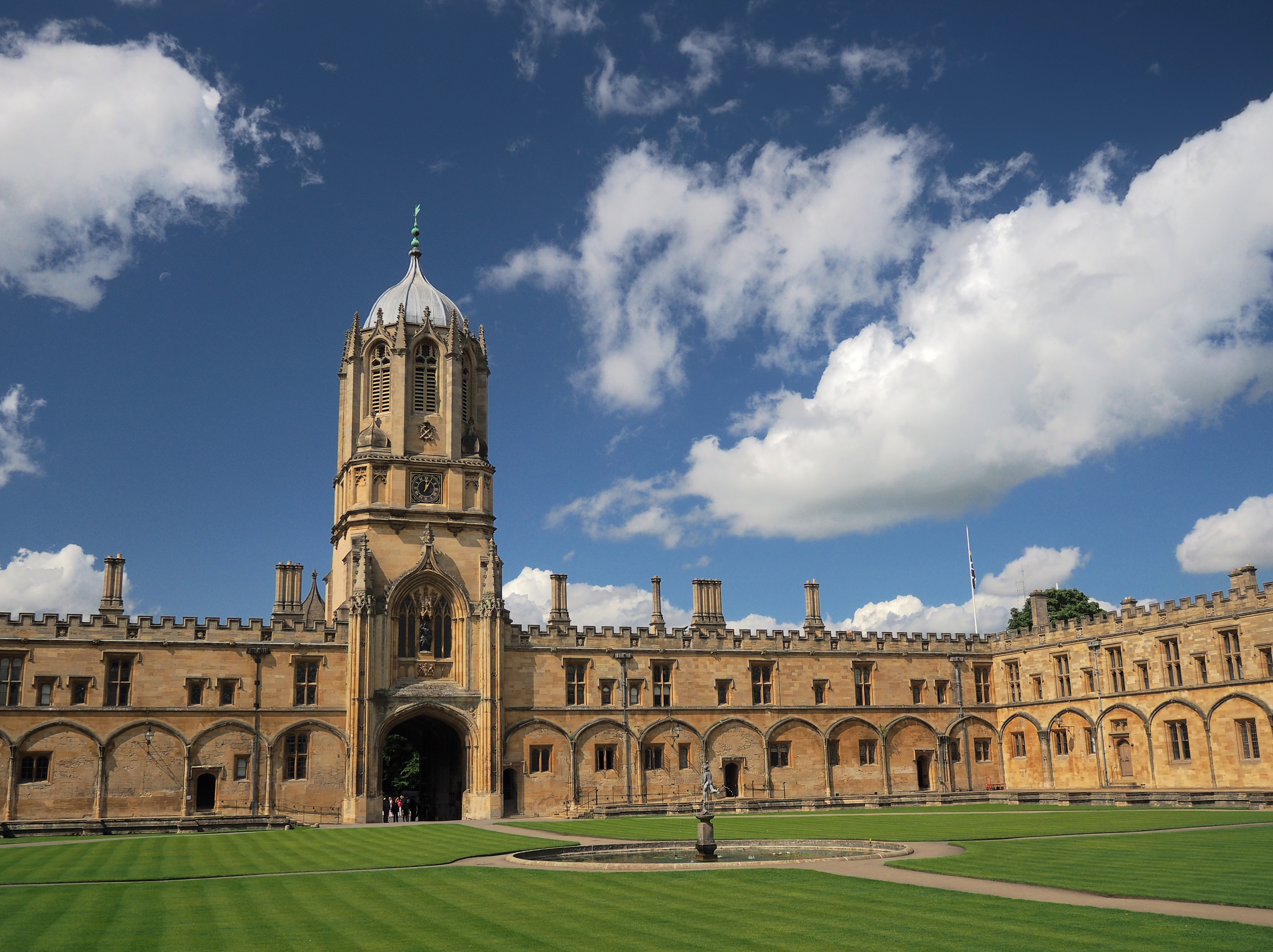
Tom Quad (1525–1529) at Christ Church, Oxford where Driver's funeral procession took place on 2 March 1914

Samuel Rolles Driver was born in Southampton. He was educated at Winchester and New College, Oxford, where he had a distinguished career, receiving a first-class degree in Literae Humaniores in 1869. He was awarded the Pusey and Ellerton scholarship in 1866, the Kennicott Scholarship in 1870 (both Hebrew), and the Houghton Syriac prize in 1872. From 1870 he was a fellow, and from 1875 also a tutor, of New College, and in 1883 succeeded Pusey as Regius Professor of Hebrew and canon of Christ Church, Oxford until his death in 1914.

He was a member of the Old Testament Revision Committee of the Revised Version (1876–1884) and examining chaplain to the Bishop of Southwell (1884–1904). He received the honorary degrees of doctor of literature of the University of Dublin (1892), doctor of divinity of the University of Glasgow (1901), and doctor of literature of the University of Cambridge (1905), and was elected a fellow of the British Academy in 1902.

Driver married Mabel, daughter of Edmund Barr, of Burgh, near Aylsham, Norfolk, in 1891; they had two sons and two daughters. He died at Oxford in 1914.

== Works ==
Among Driver's numerous works are commentaries on:

- Notes on the Hebrew Text of the Books of Samuel (Hebrew text, 1890)
- Book of Leviticus (1894 Hebrew text, 1898 trans. and notes)
- Book of Joel and the Book of Amos (1897)
- The Book of Daniel, with Introduction and Notes (1900)
- Book of Deuteronomy (1902)
- Book of Job (1905)
- The Book of the Prophet Jeremiah (1906)
- The Minor Prophets, Book of Nahum to Book of Malachi (1905)
- Book of Genesis (1909)
- The Book of Exodus (1911)

Among his more general works are:

- Isaiah, His Life and Times (1887, ed. 1893)
- Introduction to the Literature of the Old Testament (1891, ed. 1901, 1909)
- Sermons on Subjects Connected with the Old Testament, 1892
- Treatise on the Use of the Tenses in Hebrew (1892)
- The Parallel Psalter (1904)
- Hebrew and English Lexicon of the Old Testament, known as "BDB" (Brown Driver Briggs) (in collaboration, 1906)
- Modern Research as illustrating the Bible (inaugural Schweich Lecture, 1908)
- Christianity and Other Religions (with William Sanday) (1908)
- Articles in the Encyclopædia Britannica, Encyclopaedia Biblica, Hastings' Dictionary of the Bible and Dictionary of National Biography

== See also ==
- Brown Driver Briggs
