= On Explaining Language Change =

1980 book by Roger Lass

- Author: Roger Lass
- Language: English
- Subject: language change, philosophy of linguistics
- Publisher: Cambridge
- Publication date: 1980
- Media type: Print (hardcover)
- Pages: 186
- ISBN: 9780521117166

On Explaining Language Change is a 1980 book by Roger Lass in which the author examines various aspects of language change.

== Reception ==
The book was reviewed by Suzanne Romaine, Esa Itkonen and Geoffrey Sampson.
