= Phonology (disambiguation) =

Phonology is a branch of linguistics. It may also refer to:

- Phonology (journal), a journal published by Cambridge University Press
- Phonology: An Introduction to Basic Concepts, book by Roger Lass
- Phonology (Carr book), book by Philip Carr
- Phonology: Theory and Analysis, 1975 book by Larry Hyman
- Phonology: Analysis and Theory, 2002 book by Edmund Gussmann
- Phonology: A Formal Introduction, 2018 book by Charles Reiss
