= Linguistic Realities =

Book by Philip Carr

Linguistic Realities: An Autonomist Metatheory for the Generative Enterprise
- Author: Philip Carr
- Language: English
- Subject: Philosophy of linguistics
- Publisher: Cambridge University Press
- Publication date: 1990
- Media type: Print (hardcover)
- Pages: 157
- ISBN: 9780521108287

Linguistic Realities: An Autonomist Metatheory for the Generative Enterprise is a book on philosophy of linguistics by Philip Carr in which the author tries to answer the question: 'Can we reasonably speak of linguistic realities?'

== Reception ==
The book was reviewed by Wayne Cowart and Rudolf P. Botha. The book has also been viewed as "advocating for a Popperianization of generative linguistics", as well as an attempt to identify crucial methods that are characteristic of the so-called "natural sciences"; this was important as generative linguistics at the time was going through somewhat of an epistemological crisis.
