= Phonological Knowledge =

Book edited by Noel Burton-Roberts, Philip Carr & Gerard Docherty

Phonological Knowledge: Conceptual and Empirical Issues
- Author: Noel Burton-Roberts, Philip Carr, Gerard Docherty (editors)
- Language: English
- Subject: phonology
- Publisher: Oxford University Press
- Publication date: 2000
- Media type: Print (hardcover)
- Pages: 364
- ISBN: 9780198241270

Phonological Knowledge: Conceptual and Empirical Issues is a 2000 book edited by Noel Burton-Roberts, Philip Carr and Gerard Docherty in which the authors deal with different approaches to describing and explaining the nature of phonological knowledge in the speaker's grammar.

== Reception ==
The book was reviewed by Ricardo Bermúdez-Otero, Michael B. Maxwell and Yen-Hwei Lin.

== Essays ==
- Introduction, Noel Burton-Roberts, Philip Carr, and Gerard Docherty
- The Ontology of Phonology, Sylvain Bromberger and Morris Halle
- Where and What is Phonology? A representational perspective, Noel Burton-Roberts
- Scientific Realism, Sociophonetic Variation, and Innate Endowments in Phonology, Philip Carr
- Speaker, Speech, and Knowledge of Sounds, Gerard Docherty and Paul Foulkes
- Phonology and Phonetics in Psycholinguistic Models of Speech Perception, Jennifer Fitzpatrick and Linda Wheeldon
- Phonology as Cognition, Mark Hale and Charles Reiss
- Vowel Patterns in Mind and Sound, John Harris and Geoff Lindsey
- Boundary Disputes: The distinction between phonetic and phonological sound patterns, Scott Myers
- Conceptual Foundations of Phonology as a Laboratory Science, Janet Pierrehumbert, Mary Beckman, Bob Ladd
- Modularity and Modality in Phonology, Harry van der Hulst
- Phonetics and the Origin of Phonology, Marilyn Vihman and Shelley Velleman
