= Philip Carr =

Philip Carr may refer to:

- Philip Carr (linguist) (1953–2020), British linguist
- Philip J. Carr (born 1966), American anthropologist
- Phillip Carr (born 1995), American basketball player
