= Sociohistorical linguistics =

Sociohistorical linguistics, or historical sociolinguistics, is the study of the relationship between language and society in its historical dimension. A typical question in this field would, for instance, be: "How were the verb endings -s and -th (he loves vs. he loveth) distributed in Middle English society" or "When did people use French, when did they use English in 14th-century England?"

Sociohistorical linguistics is a relatively new field of linguistic research which represents a merger of two distinct sub-disciplines of linguistics: sociolinguistics and historical (or diachronic) linguistics. Researchers in this field use sociolinguistic methods to explain historical change. This approach is particularly useful when language-internal data alone is unable to account for some seemingly inexplicable developments. Instead of relying solely upon intra-linguistic evidence and data to explain language change, socio-historical linguists search for extra-linguistic causes of change. One of the seminal works in the field is Romaine (1982)'s Socio-Historical Linguistics. Other studies such as John McWhorter's work, The Missing Spanish Creoles, are more specific in this case examining the extra-linguistic reasons why there are no creoles with Spanish as a lexifier language (as opposed to English, French, Dutch, Portuguese, etc.). Not all linguists believe that sociolinguistic methods can be applied to historical situations. They argue that the sociolinguistic means at our disposal today (e.g. face-to-face interviews, recording of data, large and diverse sampling, etc.) are necessarily unavailable to sociolinguists working on historical developments. They therefore argue that it is exceedingly difficult to do socio-historical linguistics, and that the results will always be suspect due to lack of data and access to native speakers in real-world situations. For those who question the validity of socio-historical linguistics, it is a field of conjecture rather than solid conclusions. Those arguing for the validity of socio-historical linguistics reply that it is better to use what remaining textual evidence is available to begin to posit likely scenarios rather than leave some questions completely unanswered. Methods such as social network theory (cf. Lesley Milroy) that look at human interactions and their effects on the larger society are particularly well-suited to socio-historical research.

== State of the art ==
The first monograph in sociohistorical linguistics, Socio-historical Linguistics; Its Status and Methodology was published by Suzanne Romaine in 1982. The field became established in linguistics in the 1990s. Since 2000 there has also been an internet journal Historical Sociolinguistics and Sociohistorical Linguistics. In 2005 the Historical Sociolinguistics Network (HiSoN) was founded which now is the main scholarly network in the domain, organizing annual summer schools and conferences.

== Methodology ==
Due to the lack of recordings of spoken language, sociohistorical linguistics has to rely exclusively on written corpora.

== See also ==
- Historical linguistics
- Sociolinguistics
