= Roger Lass =

American linguist (born 1937)

- Born: January 1, 1937 (age 88)
- Education: Yale University (PhD, 1965)
- Spouse: Jaime Ann Krell Lass (m. 1957; died 2005)
- Scientific career
- Fields: linguistics
- Institutions: Indiana University; University of Edinburgh; University of Cape Town
- Doctoral students: John Harris
- Other notable students: Philip Carr

Roger Lass (born January 1, 1937) is a historical linguist, currently Emeritus Professor of Linguistics, University of Cape Town. He was previously an honorary professorial fellow at the University of Edinburgh.

== Career ==
Lass earned his PhD from Yale University in 1965 in Medieval English Language and Literature, and subsequently worked at Indiana University (1964–1971), the University of Edinburgh (1972–1982), and the University of Cape Town (1983–2002).

He has done extensive work in the history of English, the motivation of sound change, and the history of linguistics. He was made an honorary professor at Edinburgh in 2014.

He was the editor of the third volume of The Cambridge History of the English Language.

A festschrift in honor of Lass was published in 1997 edited by Jacek Fisiak. A volume of the journal Language Sciences, entitled Collecting views on language change (Volume 24, Issues 3–4, May–July 2002, edited by Raymond Hickey) was dedicated to Lass on his sixty fifth birthday. Other essays in his honor were published in the book Motives for Language Change (CUP 2003).

== Books ==
- Historical linguistics and language change
- Old English: A Historical Linguistic Companion
- The Shape of English
- Phonology: An Introduction to Basic Concepts
- Language and Time: A Historian's View
- On Explaining Language Change
- English Phonology and Phonological Theory
- Old English Phonology, with John Mathieson Anderson
- Approaches to English historical linguistics
