= Georgios P. Georgiou =

Greek Cypriot linguist

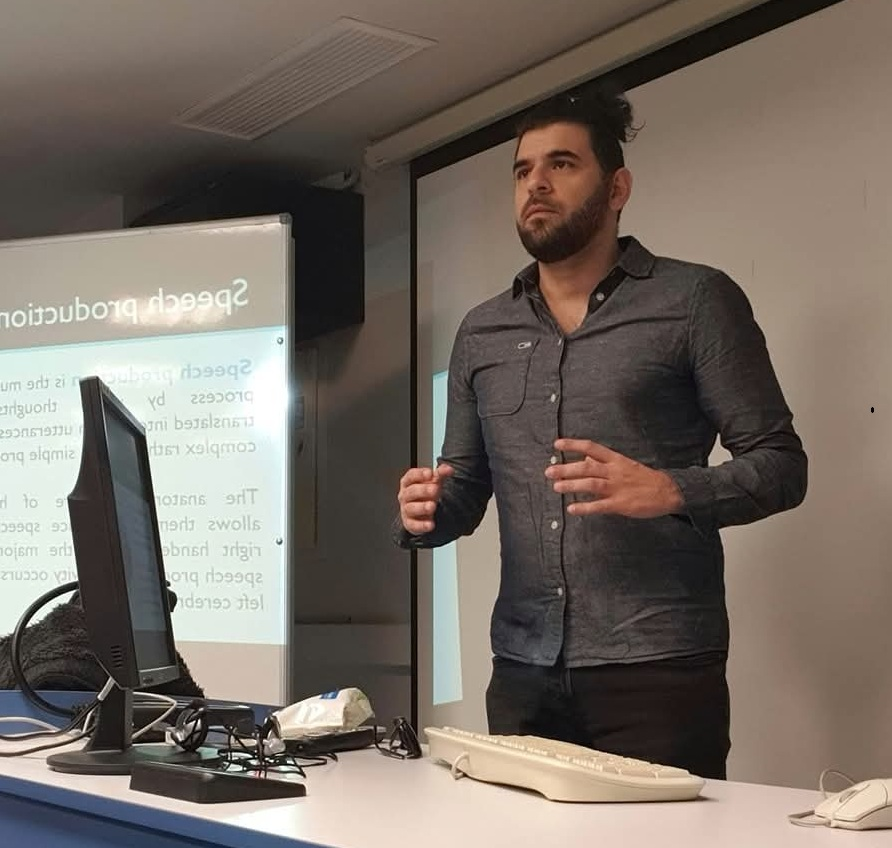
- Born: August 4, 1987 (age 39); Larnaca, Cyprus
- Occupations: Linguist, academic, author
- Awards: Cyprus Research Award - Young Researcher 2023 in Humanities and Social Sciences; Fellow of the Young Academy of Europe

Academic background
- Education: BA in Greek Philology, University of Cyprus; MA in Education, University of Cyprus; PhD in Linguistics, University of Cyprus

Academic work
- Institutions: University of Nicosia
- Website: http://georgiougeorg.com

Georgios P. Georgiou (Greek pronunciation: [ʝeˈor.ʝi.os pi ʝe.orˈʝi.u] (Note: His first name is commonly pronounced [ʝiˈor.ɣos] in Greek (Γιώργος, Giórgos); the English equivalent is George.); born 4 August 1987) is a Greek Cypriot linguist, academic, and author. He is an Assistant Professor of Linguistics at the University of Nicosia. He is the Associate Head of the Department of Languages and Literature and Director of the Phonetic Lab. He has been awarded the Cyprus Research Award – Young Researcher 2023 in the field of Humanities and Social Sciences by the Cyprus Research and Innovation Foundation. In 2024, he was elected a Fellow of the Young Academy of Europe.

Georgiou's work concentrates on speech acquisition, language acquisition, speech-language disorders, machine learning, and artificial intelligence. He has more than 100 publications, the majority of which are articles in journals such as Applied Acoustics, Attention, Perception, & Psychophysics, Humanities and Social Sciences Communications, Journal of Autism and Developmental Disorders, and Scientific Reports. His publications also include edited volumes and books, such as Advances in Second/Foreign Language Acquisition published by Palgrave Macmillan and An Introduction to Issues in General Linguistics.

== Education ==
Georgiou obtained a BA in Greek Philology (2007–2011), an MA in Education (2011–2013), and a PhD in Linguistics (2014–2018) from the University of Cyprus.

== Career ==
Georgiou began his academic career in 2018 as a Postdoctoral Researcher and Assistant Lecturer of Linguistics at RUDN University. In 2020, he returned to Cyprus to work as an Associate Lecturer of Linguistics at the University of Central Lancashire. The following year, he served as a Postdoctoral Researcher of Speech-Language Disorders at the Cyprus University of Technology. In 2022, he was elected Assistant Professor of Linguistics at the University of Nicosia.

In 2023, he founded the Phonetic Lab at the University of Nicosia and has been serving as its Director since then.

As of October 2024, he serves as the Associate Head of the Department of Languages and Literature of the University of Nicosia.

== Research ==
Georgiou investigates how speech and language can be leveraged to advance our understanding of second language acquisition, with the aim of informing educational support, and of neurological conditions, with the aim of improving clinical support. His work is grounded in the interface of linguistics and other fields, such as artificial intelligence, education, cognitive science, and clinical neurology.

His research focuses on the development of predictive frameworks to better model second language speech and language in typically developing individuals and to optimize learning outcomes. In parallel, it focuses on the design of computational approaches — particularly machine learning and interpretable modeling — to support the automatic detection, assessment, and monitoring of neurodevelopmental and neurodegenerative conditions, using speech- and language-based features. At its core, his interdisciplinary research program aims to generate real-world impact by informing effective interventions in educational and clinical practice.

== Honors and awards ==
Georgiou received the Cyprus Research Award – Young Researcher 2023 in the field of Humanities and Social Sciences by the Cyprus Research and Innovation Foundation. The rationale behind this accolade was, according to the review committee, his consistent production of high-quality research, which is recognized both nationally and internationally, and the excellence of his inter- and intra-disciplinary research, which effectively integrates emerging technologies into his area of expertise, facilitating their application in similar fields. Furthermore, the committee highlighted that the number of his publications in internationally recognized journals exceeds the world average in his field and that the launch of the Phonetic Lab indicates his insight and effective leadership skills.

In 2024, he was unanimously elected Fellow of the Young Academy of Europe as a recognition of his "outstanding scientific achievements", according to the rationale provided by the committee of the organization.

== Selected journal articles ==
This is an indicative list of Georgiou's peer reviewed journal articles:

- Georgiou, G. P., & Paphiti, M. (2026). Machine learning classification of autistic adults using vowel acoustic features. Research in Autism, 137, 202995. https://doi.org/10.1016/j.reia.2026.202995
- Georgiou, G. P., & Savva, E. (2026). Exploring acoustic overlap in second language vowel productions. International Journal of Applied Linguistics, 36(2), 1293–1304. https://doi.org/10.1111/ijal.12859
- Georgiou, G. P. (2026). Improving nonnative speech perception and production through an AI-powered application. Humanities and Social Sciences Communications, 13, 891. https://doi.org/10.1057/s41599-026-07186-z
- Georgiou, G. P., & Theodorou, E. (2025). Voicing Discrimination as a Diagnostic Marker of Developmental Language Disorder. Journal of Neurolinguistics, 73, 101228. doi: 10.1016/j.jneuroling.2024.101228
- Georgiou, G. P. (2023). Comparison of the prediction accuracy of machine learning algorithms in crosslinguistic vowel classification. Scientific Reports, 13, 15594. doi: 10.1038/s41598-023-42818-3
