= The Shape of English =

Book on Historical linguistics

The Shape of English: Structure and History
- Author: Roger Lass
- Language: English
- Subject: language change
- Publisher: Dent
- Publication date: 1987
- Media type: Print (hardcover)

The Shape of English: Structure and History is a 1987 book by Roger Lass in which the author examines the history and structure of the English language.

== Reception ==
The book was reviewed by John Algeo, Richard M. Hogg and Alan Ward.
