= The New Cambridge History of the English Language =

History books about the English language

- Editor: Raymond Hickey
- Subject: Comprehensive history of the English language
- Publisher: Cambridge University Press
- Publication date: 2025-6
- Pages: 5552
- ISBN: 9781009202022

The New Cambridge History of the English Language (2025–6) is a completely new version of the previous work The Cambridge History of the English Language, published in six volumes under the general editorship of Richard M. Hogg between 1992 and 2001. It has been prepared under the general editorship of Raymond Hickey.

The new history is organised differently from the original work and consists of some 172 chapters by 227 contributors. The chapters are about 25 pages in length, thus allowing them to be used as reading material for a particular week in a course on the history of English. In addition, there are seven ‘long view’ chapters which summarise developments on levels of language throughout the entire history of English.

== Volumes of the new history of the English language ==
- Volume I: Context, contact and development (ed. Laura Wright and Raymond Hickey)
- Volume II: Documentation, data and modelling (ed. Erik Smitterberg and Merja Kytö)
- Volume III: Transmission, change and ideology (ed. Joan Beal)
- Volume IV: Britain, Ireland and Europe (ed. Raymond Hickey)
- Volume V: North America and the Caribbean (ed. Natalie Schilling, Derek Denis and Raymond Hickey)
- Volume VI: Africa, Asia, Australasia and the Pacific (2 books, ed. Raymond Hickey)

Part I: English in Africa and the South Atlantic (book 1)

Part II: English in Asia, Australasia and the Pacific (book 2)

A full list of the chapters and their authors is available on Raymond Hickey's website. For information on the publication of the new history, see the publishers website.

== See also ==
- The Cambridge History of the English Language.
- The Cambridge Grammar of the English Language.
- An Introduction to the New Cambridge History of the English Language.
