= Philip Carr (linguist) =

British linguist (1953–2020)

- Born: 25 September 1953; Scotland
- Died: 30 March 2020 (aged 66); Edinburgh
- Education: University of Edinburgh (PhD)
- Children: Thomas Carr BRULARD and Sophie Carr BRULARD and Lucille Bluefield
- Scientific career
- Fields: linguistics
- Institutions: University of Montpellier (1999 to 2017), University of Newcastle-Upon-Tyne (1983-1999), University of Khartoum, University of Texas at Austin, University of Canterbury at Christchurch
- Thesis: Instrumentalism, realism and the object of inquiry in theoretical linguistics (1987)
- Doctoral advisor: J. R. Hurford
- Other academic advisors: Roger Lass, Noel Burton-Roberts, E. Itkonen

Philip Carr (25 September 1953 – 30 March 2020) was a British linguist and Emeritus Professor in the English Department of the University of Montpellier. He is best known for his works on phonology and philosophy of linguistics.

== Career ==
Philip Carr earned his PhD at the University of Edinburgh in 1987 with a thesis entitled, "Instrumentalism, realism and the object of inquiry in theoretical linguistics." He was lecturer and then senior lecturer at the University of Newcastle upon Tyne from 1985 - 1999. In 1999 he took up a position as Professor at the University of Montpellier where he remained until his retirement in 2017.

He wrote two widely used textbooks: Phonology and English Phonetics and Phonology. Both went into second and even third editions, attesting to their continued popularity and usefulness.

== Books ==
- Phonology, Palgrave Macmillan 1993 (1st ed.), 2013 (2nd ed.) ISBN 978-0312103576
- A Glossary of Phonology, Edinburgh University Press 2008
- Linguistic realities: an autonomist metatheory for the generative enterprise, Cambridge University Press 1990
- English Phonetics and Phonology: An Introduction, 3rd edition 2019. ISBN 978-1119533740
- Headhood, Elements, Specification and Contrastivity: Phonological papers in honour of John Anderson (co-ed. with Jacques Durand and Colin Ewen) John Benjamins 2005. ISBN 978-1588116178
- Phonological Knowledge: Conceptual and Empirical Issues, with Noel Burton-Roberts and Gerard Docherty (eds.), Oxford University Press 2000
