= English Phonetics and Phonology: An Introduction =

Book by Philip Carr

- Author: Philip Carr
- Language: English
- Subject: phonology
- Publisher: Wiley-Blackwell
- Publication date: 3rd Edition (2019)
- Media type: Print (hardcover)
- Pages: 256

English Phonetics and Phonology: An Introduction is a book by Philip Carr in which the author provides an introduction to the phonological structure of the English language. It is a very popular textbook.

== Reception ==
The book was reviewed by Dominic Watt, Marc Picard, Bert Botma and Georgios P. Georgiou.
