= Norman Blake (academic) =

British academic (1934–2012)

- Born: Norman Francis Blake; 19 April 1934; Ceará, Brazil
- Died: 29 July 2012 (aged 78); Sheffield, England

Academic background
- Education: Magdalen College, Oxford (B.Litt.)

Academic work
- Discipline: Linguistics
- Institutions: University of Liverpool; University of Sheffield

Norman Francis Blake (19 April 1934 – 29 July 2012) was a British academic and scholar specialising in Middle English and Early Modern English language and literature on which he published abundantly during his career.

== Life ==
Norman Blake was born in Ceará, Brazil, where his English father worked as a banker at the Bank of London and South America. His mother was half-Brazilian and half-German. In 1938, when he was four years old, he was sent to boarding school in Surrey and then to Magdalen College School in Brackley, Northamptonshire, in 1944. The outbreak of World War II meant that he was not able to see his parents for eight years. Two years after the end of the war his older brother, who attended the same boarding school, died in an accident.

In 1953 he went up to study at Magdalen College where his tutors for Medieval English were, amongst others, C. S. Lewis and J. A. W. Bennett, and for Old Icelandic Gabriel Turville-Petre. During the academic year 1956–1957 he studied Old Icelandic manuscripts at the newly established Arnamagnæan Institute, part of the University of Copenhagen. He finished his studies with a BLitt in 1959. Following his studies at Oxford, he was appointed assistant lecturer at the University of Liverpool where he stayed until 1973, interrupted only by an interval as visiting professor at the University of Toronto in 1963–1964. In 1973 Blake was appointed to the Chair of English Language at the University of Sheffield, becoming head of the Department for English Language and Linguistics, a post he held until 1998. When the Department of English Language and Linguistics was amalgamated with the Department of English Literature, Blake moved to De Montfort University, Leicester, taking up a research professorship.

Norman Blake married Susan Valery Miles at Liverpool in 1965. The couple adopted a daughter, Dorinda, born in 1973. He was an ardent user of public transport and enjoyed hiking, particularly in the Peak District.

In May 2004 Norman Blake suffered a massive stroke severely restricting his movement and speaking capabilities. The ensuing years he spent either at home or at the Royal Hallamshire Hospital. Norman Blake died on 29 July 2012. He was survived by his wife and daughter.

== Scholarship ==
Blake's finishing project at Magdalen College in 1959 was editing the Jómsvíkinga saga. His edition of the saga was published in 1962. Whilst being at Liverpool University he published an edition of the Old English poem The Phoenix in 1964, and in 1970 an edition of William Caxton's translation of the Middle Dutch version of The History of Reynard the Fox.

In the late 1960s and during the 1970s it emerged that Blake's academic interests were twofold, namely the history of the English Language, particularly late medieval and early modern, and The Canterbury Tales. This led to extensive work not only on William Caxton, but also on William Shakespeare. The publication of a monograph on William Caxton in 1969, Caxton and His World, established Blake as one of the foremost scholars on the subject. In the book he put an emphasis on the larger context in which Caxton was operating and challenged the traditional views on Caxton by positing that Caxton was predominantly a merchant and entrepreneur rather than a craftsman printer. Eventually, he would publish more than 40 books and essays on Caxton.

In 1980 Blake published an edition of The Canterbury Tales, based on the Hengwrt manuscript. This edition was, at the time, not well received as Blake advocated the significance and importance of the Hengwrt manuscript, being the oldest manuscript of the tales, and should take precedence over the Ellesmere manuscript on which most published editions and translations were based. The criticism led him to publish a number of books and articles over the following 15 years enhancing and augmenting his argument.

Blake contributed several articles to the German encyclopaedia Lexikon des Mittelalters, and to the Dictionary of the Middle Ages, published by the American Council of Learned Societies. He was also active as editor and contributor to the second volume of The Cambridge History of the English Language published in 1992.

From 1994 until 2000 Blake was head of the Canterbury Tales Project. The project was first based at the University of Sheffield and from 1998 onwards at De Montfort University. It was funded by amongst others the Leverhulme Trust and the British Academy. Its aim was to make electronically available all the manuscripts and early printed versions of The Canterbury Tales, a total of approximately 80 manuscripts and books elucidating the textual tradition of the work and providing understanding of the reshaping of the English language during an important phase in its history. By the end of the project eight manuscripts were transcribed as well as the best part of seven others as well as all witnesses of The Franklin's Tale, consisting of about 330,000 words. Subsequently, The Wife of Bath's Prologue and The General Prologue were released on CD-ROM, and the Hengwrt Manuscript on CD. No further transcriptions were published until in 2011 the Digital Humanities Institute of the University of Sheffield developed online editions of diplomatic transcriptions of eight of the manuscripts prepared by the Canterbury Tales Project, called the Norman Blake Editions of The Canterbury Tales.

== Commemoration ==
Following his death, the School of English at the University of Sheffield founded a biennial lecture, the Norman Blake Lecture to honour Norman Blake. The first lecture was held in 2013.

== Selected publications ==
=== Editions ===
- The Saga of the Jomsvikings, London, Thomas Nelson and Sons Ltd 1962.
- The Phoenix, Manchester, Manchester University Press 1964.
- The History of Reynard the Fox, Oxford, Oxford University Press 1970. ISBN 0-197-22267-6
- Selections from William Caxton. With an introduction, notes and glossary, Oxford, Clarendon Press 1973. ISBN 0-1987-1081-X
- Caxton's Own Prose, London, Andre Deutsch 1973. ISBN 0-233-96475-4
- Quattuor Sermones. Printed by William Caxton, Heidelberg, Winter 1975. ISBN 3-533-02429-6
- The Canterbury Tales: From the Hengwrt Manuscript, London, Edward Arnold 1980. ISBN 0-713-16271-6

=== Monographs ===
- Caxton and His World, London, Andre Deutsch 1969. ISBN 0-233-96093-7
- Middle English Religious Prose, London, Edward Arnold 1972. ISBN 0-713-15610-4
- Caxton. England's First Publisher, London, Osprey Publishing 1976. ISBN 0-850-45106-X
- The English Language in Medieval Literature, London, Dent 1977. ISBN 0-874-71989-5
- Non-standard Language in English Literature, London, Andre Deutsch 1981. ISBN 0-233-97422-9
- Shakespeare's Language. An Introduction, London, Macmillan 1983. ISBN 0-333-28639-1
  - Re-issued as The Language of Shakespeare, New York, Palgrave 1989. ISBN 978-0-333-49778-4
- English Historical Linguistics. Studies in Development, (with Charles Jones), Sheffield, Department of English Language 1984.
- The Textual Tradition of the Canterbury Tales, London, Hodder Arnold 1985. ISBN 0-713-16448-4
- William Caxton. A Bibliographical Guide, New York, Garland Publishing 1985. ISBN 0-824-08891-3
- Index of Printed Middle English Prose, New York, Garland Publishing 1985. ISBN 0-824-08839-5
- Traditional English Grammar and Beyond, Basingstoke, Macmillan 1988. ISBN 0-333-39921-8
- An Introduction to the Language of Literature, Basingstoke, Macmillan 1990. ISBN 0-333-45410-3
- William Caxton and English Literary Culture, London, A&C Black 1991. ISBN 1-852-85051-5
- The Cambridge History of the English Language, Volume II (editor and contributor), Cambridge, Cambridge University Press 1992. ISBN 978-1139-05553-6
- An Introduction to the English Language (with Jean Moorhead), Basingstoke, Macmillan 1993. ISBN 0-333-57302-1
- A New Concordance to The Canterbury Tales Based on Blake's Text Edited from the Hengwrt Manuscript, Okayama, University Education 1994 ISBN 4-887-30127-8
- A History of the English Language, Basingstoke, Macmillan 1996. ISBN 0-333-60983-2
- The General Prologue, Geoffrey Chaucer (edited by Elizabeth Solopova), Cambridge, Cambridge University Press 2000. ISBN 0-521-58808-1
- A Grammar of Shakespeare's Language, Basingstoke, Palgrave 2001. ISBN 0-333-72590-5
- Shakespeare's Non-Standard English. A Dictionary of his Informal Language, London, Continuum 2006. ISBN 0-826-49123-5

== See also ==
- The Canterbury Tales
- Old English literature
- Middle English literature
- Old Norse literature
- William Shakespeare
- Elizabethan literature
- William Caxton
