= John Harris (phonologist) =

Irish linguist

- Born: 1954 (age 71–72); Belfast, N. Ireland
- Education: University of Edinburgh (PhD)
- Scientific career
- Fields: linguistics
- Institutions: University College London
- Thesis: Linguistic change in a nonstandard dialect: phonological studies in the history of English in Ireland (1983)
- Doctoral advisor: Roger Lass, Gillian Brown
- Other academic advisors: Jim Milroy, Lesley Milroy, John C Wells, Nigel Gotteri

John Harris (born 1954) is an Irish linguist and Emeritus Professor of Linguistics at University College London. He is best known for his works on phonetics and phonology. A festschrift in his honor titled Sonic Signatures edited by Geoff Lindsey and Andrew Nevins was published in 2017.

== Books ==
- Phonological variation and change: studies in Hiberno-English, Cambridge University Press 1985
- English sound structure, Wiley-Blackwell 1994
