= Assistant professor =

Academic rank used in universities and colleges

Assistant professor is an academic rank just below the rank of an associate professor used in universities or colleges, mainly in the United States, Canada, Japan, and South Korea.

== Overview ==
This position is generally taken after earning a doctoral degree and sometimes after several years of holding one or more postdoctoral researcher positions. It is below the position of associate professor and full professor at most North American universities and is equivalent to the rank of lecturer at most Commonwealth universities. In the United States, assistant professor is often the first position held in a tenure track, although it can also be a non-tenure track position. A typical professorship sequence is assistant professor, associate professor, and full professor in order. After seven years, if successful, assistant professors can get tenure and also get promotion to associate professor.

There is high demand for vacant tenure-track assistant professor positions, often with hundreds of applicants. Less than 20% of doctoral graduates move onto a tenure-track assistant professor position after graduation.

== Comparison ==
The table presents a broad overview of the traditional main systems, but there are universities that use a combination of those systems or other titles. Some universities in Commonwealth countries have also entirely adopted the North American system in place of the Commonwealth system.

North American system	Commonwealth system
Professor (higher tier, including distinguished professor or equivalent) (available only in some positions)	Professor (chair)
Professor	Reader (mainly UK) or associate professor (mainly Australia, NZ, South Africa, Southeast Asia, Ireland)
Associate professor	Senior lecturer
Assistant professor	Lecturer
Instructor	Associate lecturer (commonly the entry-level position)
