= A Critical Introduction to Phonetics =

Book by Ken Lodge

- Author: Ken Lodge
- Language: English
- Subject: phonetics
- Publisher: Continuum International Publishing Group
- Publication date: 2009
- Media type: Print (hardcover)
- Pages: 259
- ISBN: 9781441195814

A Critical Introduction to Phonetics is a 2009 book by Ken Lodge designed for an introductory course in phonetics.

== Reception ==
The book was reviewed by Linda Shockey, Camilo Enrique Díaz Romero and Morteza Taheri.
