= Social network (sociolinguistics) =

Structure of a speech community

In the field of sociolinguistics, social network describes the structure of a particular speech community. Social networks are composed of a "web of ties" (Lesley Milroy) between individuals, and the structure of a network will vary depending on the types of connections it is composed of. Social network theory (as used by sociolinguists) posits that social networks, and the interactions between members within the networks, are a driving force behind language change.

== Structure ==
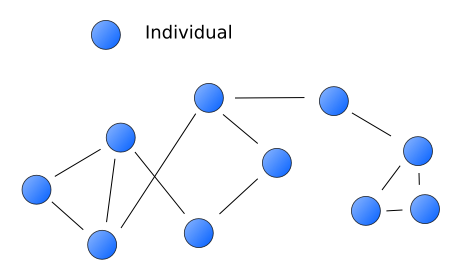
A very simple social network. The black lines represent connections between individuals.

=== Participants ===
The key participant in a social network is the anchor, or center individual. From this anchor, ties of varying strengths radiate outwards to other people with whom the anchor is directly linked. These people are represented by points. Participants in a network, regardless of their position, can also be referred to as actors or members.

=== Relationships ===
There are multiple ways to describe the structure of a social network. Among them are density, member closeness centrality, multiplexity, and orders. These metrics measure the different ways of connecting within of a network, and when used together they provide a complete picture of the structure of a particular network.

A social network is defined as either "loose" or "tight" depending on how connected its members are with each other, as measured by factors like density and multiplexity. This measure of tightness is essential to the study of socially motivated language change because the tightness of a social network correlates with lack of innovation in the population's speech habits. Conversely, a loose network is more likely to innovate linguistically.

==== Density ====
The density of a given social network is found by dividing the number of all existing links between the actors by the number of potential links within the same set of actors. The higher the resulting number, the denser a network is. Dense networks are most likely to be found in small, stable communities with few external contacts and a high degree of social cohesion. Loose social networks, by contrast, are more liable to develop in larger, unstable communities that have many external contacts and exhibit a relative lack of social cohesion.

==== Member closeness centrality ====
Member closeness centrality is the measurement of how close an individual actor is to all the other actors in the community. An actor with high closeness centrality is a central member, and thus has frequent interaction with other members of the network. A central member of a network tends to be under pressure to maintain the norms of that network, while a peripheral member of the network (one with a low closeness centrality score) does not face such pressure. Therefore, central members of a given network are typically not the first members to adopt a linguistic innovation because they are socially motivated to speak according to pre-existing norms within the network.

==== Multiplexity ====
Multiplexity is the number of separate social connections between any two actors. It has been defined as the "interaction of exchanges within and across relationships". A single tie between individuals, such as a shared workplace, is a uniplex relationship. A tie between individuals is multiplex when those individuals interact in multiple social contexts. For instance, A is B's boss, and they have no relationship outside of work, so their relationship is uniplex. However, C is both B's coworker and neighbor, so the relationship between B and C is multiplex, since they interact with each other in a variety of social roles.

==== Orders ====
Orders are a way of defining the place of a speaker within a social network. Actors are classified into three different zones depending on the strength of their connection to a certain actor. The closer an individual's connection to the central member is, the more powerful an individual will be within their network. Social network theories of language change look for correlation between a speaker's order and their use of prestigious or non-prestigious linguistic variants.

Visualization of snowball sampling technique showing two sampling zones. The first-order zone contains 7 individuals (black nodes). The second-order zone contains individuals that have direct contact to individuals in the first-order zone. The circles indicate the boundaries of the zones.

- First order zone

A first order zone is composed of all individuals that are directly linked to any given individual. The first order zone can also be referred to as the "interpersonal environment" or "neighborhood". A first order member of a network is an actor who has a large number of direct connections to the center of the network.

- Second order zone

A second order zone is a grouping of any individuals who are connected to at least one actor within the first order zone. However, actors in the second order zone are not directly connected to the central member of the network. A second order member has a loose or indirect connection to the network, and may only be connected to a certain network member.

- Third order zone

A third order zone is made up of newly observed individuals not directly connected to the first order zone. Third order members may be connected to actors in the second order zone, but not the first. They are peripheral members of the network, and are often the actors with the lowest member closeness centrality, since they may not have frequent contact with other members of the network.

== Language change ==
=== Sociolinguistic research ===
==== Fieldwork ====
Social networks are used in sociolinguistics to explain linguistic variation in terms of community norms, rather than broad categories like gender or race. Instead of focusing on the social characteristics of speakers, social network analysis concentrates on the relationships between speakers, then considers linguistic change in the light of those relationships. In an effort to depart from variationist sociolinguistics, the concept of the social network has been used to examine the links between the strength of network ties and the use of a linguistic variant. This allows researchers to create an accurate picture of a community's language use without resorting to stereotypical classification.

The concept of social networks is applicable at both the macro and micro levels. Social networks are at work in communities as large as nation-states or as small as an online dating service. They can also be applied to intimate social groups such as a friendship, family unit, or neighborhood. Because even the smallest of networks contains an enormous number of potential connections between actors, sociolinguists usually only study small networks so that the fieldwork is manageable. In fact, even when studying small networks, sociolinguists rely on the metrics outlined in the previous section, rather than mapping the network out, one connection at a time. One way of mapping the general structure of a network is to assign a strength scale to each speaker. For example, in Lesley Milroy's study of social networks in Belfast, Northern Ireland, the researchers measured five social variables, which together generated a strength scale for each member of the network:

(1) Membership of a high-density, territorially based cluster.
(2) Having substantial ties of kinship in the neighborhood (more than one household, in addition to his own nuclear family).
(3) Working at the same place as at least two others from the same area.
(4) The same place of work as at least two others of the same sex from the area.
(5) Voluntary association with work mates in leisure hours.

The allocation of a network strength score allows the network patterns of individuals to be measured and possible links with linguistic patterns to be tested.

==== Computational modeling ====
In recent years, computer simulation and modeling have been used to study social networks from a broader perspective. Because previous social network studies were focused on individual connections, the size of the networks were limited so that the researcher could work personally with subjects. With the rise of advanced computer modeling techniques, sociolinguists have been able to study the linguistic behavior of large networks of individuals over long periods of time without the inconvenience of individually working with thousands of subjects.

Advances in computer simulation and modeling technology have been used to study social networks on a larger scale, both with more participants and over a greater span of time. Previous social network studies had to examine individual connections in great detail, and so had to limit the size of the networks involved. Linguists working in the field were also unable to accurately pinpoint the causes of linguistic change because it tends to occur slowly over a long period of time, on a scale beyond the scope of a single research project. With the rise of computer modeling, sociolinguists have been able to study the linguistic behavior of large networks without the huge expenditure of time required to individually work with thousands of subjects long-term. The pioneering study in this field was Fagyal et al. in 2011.

=== Social network theory ===
Because social networks investigate the forces that impact individual behavior, rather than simply attributing linguistic difference to social class, a theory of language change based on social networks is able to explain linguistic behavior more deeply than variationist sociolinguistics. The two major findings of social network theory are that dense (highly interconnected) networks are resistant to change, and that most linguistic change is initiated by weak links—people who are not centrally connected to the network in question. Though most sociolinguists working on social networks agree on these findings, there has been extended debate about which actors in the network are the primary drivers of linguistic change. The results of this debate are two theories, the strong-tie theory, and the weak-tie theory.

==== Strong tie theory ====
The strong tie theory, or agentive theory, has long been thought of in classical sociolinguistic theory as a driver of change, even prior to social network theory. In the context of social network theory, agents are the people who are most connected to others in the network, and whose speech style is often imitated by people within the network. These agents also regulate language usage inside the network, and therefore ensure the dominance of their preferred variant form throughout the network, because group members are more likely to adopt high-status variants. Strong tie networks are believed to be resistant to linguistic innovation, because prestige forms also tend to be conservative forms. Central agents are also able to engage in dialogues with leaders in other network. According to strong-tie theory, this is how new variants are spread. William Labov's study of Philadelphia speech communities provides an example of the strong-tie theory.

==== Weak tie theory ====
Sociolinguists have recently begun to focus their studies on weak links: individuals who are not closely tied to a group, such as people who move frequently or live in isolated areas. The weak tie theory, first proposed by Milroy and Milroy in 1983, posits that language change is propagated by the people who are second order members of social networks. Agents who are weakly connected are more likely to come into contact with new linguistic variants, since they spend most of their time interacting with people outside of the central network. Loosely connected individuals are also under less social pressure to conform to group language practices than integral members. Weak-tie social network theory postulates that linguistic variables are spread by means of weak, uni-dimensional social links between non-central individuals. Therefore it is the case that language change will have the propensity to be faster in larger communities rather than in smaller communities. Support for this theory is found in Labov's study of "lames" in Harlem, and in Lesley Milroy's 1987 Belfast study.

== Linguistic studies ==
=== Support for the strong-tie theory ===
==== The jocks and burnouts study ====
This study demonstrated that actors chose to imitate other (more prestigious) actors who embodied desirable social attributes, especially "toughness" as exemplified by urban students. This imitation of desirable qualities indicates that strongly connected agents lead change by spreading norms through network members. In Eckert's study of speech norms in Detroit high schools, she notes that suburban youth adopted the speech traits of urban youth (including a diphthongized and lowered [i]).

==== The Philadelphia study ====
Labov's 1986 study of Philadelphia speech communities (a term used before "social networks" became widespread) demonstrated that the agents of linguistic change were the leaders of the speech communities. Actors with high levels of prestige in the linguistic led the use of these forms, and enforced them as norms within the community. Members of this network then used the forms normalized within the network outside of the network, and continuous usage led to wide adoption of these speech norms.

==== The Japanese school study ====
Takeshi Sibata's 1960 study of elementary school children provides strong support for the view that insiders, or leaders, in a social network facilitate language change. He interviewed several elementary school children, and taught them some invented words he created for the purpose of this study. After teaching the students these words, and telling them to teach the other students these words, he came back a week later to observe the results. A few children, those who were popular, friendly, cheerful, active in class activities, were the main people who spread those words. As the centers of their respective networks, these children functioned as strong-tie leaders of linguistic change.

=== Support for the weak-tie theory ===
==== The Harlem study ====
Labov's 1966 study of African American Vernacular English in South Harlem, revealed that second-order actors in African American social networks were the initiators of linguistic change in their communities. Though these second-order actors, or "lames" were not held in high regard by the leaders of the speech network, they had connections to other networks, and were sources of new linguistic variables. This study served as the basis of the Weak Tie Theory proposed by Milroy and Milroy.

Map of central Belfast

==== The Belfast studies ====
===== Belfast: the original study =====
This Milroy and Milroy study examined vernacular English as it was spoken in inner-city Belfast in the 1970s, in three working class communities in Belfast: those in the Ballymacarrett area, the Hammer area, and the Clonard area. Milroy took part in the life of each community as an acquaintance, or 'friend of a friend', investigating the correlation between the integration of individuals in the community and the way those individuals speak.

Each individual studied was given a network strength score based on the person's knowledge of other people in the community, the workplace and at leisure activities to give a score of 1 to 5, with 5 being the highest network 'strength score'. Out of the five variables, one measured density, while the other four measured multiplexity.

Each person's use of phonological variables, (ai), (a), (l), (th), (ʌ), (e), which were clearly indexical of the Belfast urban speech community, were then measured. The independent variables for this study were age, sex and location. These linguistic variables made up the dependent variable of the study, and were analyzed in relation to the network structure and background of each individual speaker. Deviation from the regional standard was determined by density and multiplicity of the social networks into which speakers are integrated.

The researchers found that a high network strength score was correlated with the use of vernacular forms, and therefore that the use of vernacular variants was strongly influenced by the level of integration into a network. The conclusion of the study was that close-knit networks are important for dialect maintenance.

===== Belfast: subsequent study =====
This 1987 study, also conducted by Milroy, examined the variable [u], and its relationship to working class identity. The researchers found that actors with the weakest tie to this community identity were most likely to use the variable [u], possibly as a way to strengthen their ties to the network.

In Ballymacarrett, one of the villages the researchers surveyed, unrounded [u] was most often used by young males and females, who had weak ties to the working class networks, but use the variables frequently to project an image of working-class toughness. These young people often interacted with members of other social networks, and thus spread the [u] realization through their own social networks, which resulted in the adoption of unrounded [u] in most of Belfast. These results provide support for the weak tie theory of language change, because it was the actors on the peripheries of social networks who were responsible for spreading linguistic change.

=== Bridging the two theories ===
==== The leaders and loners study ====
One key study that employed computer simulations was Fagyal, Swarup, Escobar, Gasser, and Lakkarajud's work on the roles of group insiders (leaders) and outsiders (loners) in language change. The researchers found that both first-order and second-order network members (also known as "leaders" and "loners") were both needed in order for changes to spread predictably within the network.

In this study, the researchers simulated a social network of 900 participants, called nodes, which were connected into a network using a matrix algorithm. They then randomly assigned a linguistic variant to each node. On each cycle of the algorithm, every node interacted with another node, and the variant assigned to each node changed randomly depending on which variant the other node had. This cycle was repeated 40,000 times, and at the end of each cycle, the variant connected to each node was recorded.

The results of the Fagyal et al. study indicated that "in a large, socially heterogenous population", one linguistic variant eventually became the community norm, though other variants were not entirely eliminated. However, when the researchers manipulated the network to remove either loners or leaders, the results changed: without loners, one variant rapidly caused the loss of all other variants; and without leaders, no single variant became the norm for a majority of speakers.

These findings allowed the researchers to address the major debate in social network theory: whether it is leaders (or centers) or loners who are responsible for language change. In their findings, the presence of both leaders and loners was essential, though the two types of agents played different roles in the process of change.

Rather than introducing entirely new forms, leaders accelerate the adoption of forms that already exist within the network. Conversely, the researchers describe the loners' role this way: "when loners are a part of a population structure that allows their influence to reach centrally-connected hubs, they can have a decisive impact on the linguistic system over time."

Previously, researchers had posited that loners preserved old forms that had been neglected by the larger community. Fagyal et al. complicate this claim by suggesting that the role of loners in a network is to safeguard old features, then reintroduce them to the community.

=== New work on online social networks ===
==== The Internet Chatrooms study ====
The researchers in Berg's 2006 study of digital social networks as linguistic social networks note the value of social networks as both linguistic corpuses and linguistic networks.

==== The Facebook study ====
In Carmen Perez-Sabater's 2012 study of Facebook users, she discusses the use of English by native and non-native speakers on university Facebook pages. The researchers categorize these posts as a model of "computer-mediated communication", a new communication style that combines features of writing and speech. Facebook posts generally have a degree of informality, whether the users are native or nonnative English speakers, but native English speakers often have a higher degree of informality. For example, non-native speakers cited in the study use separated letter-style greetings and salutations, indicating linguistic insecurity. The conclusions of the study were that "computer-mediated communication" do not always tend toward informality, and that online social networks pattern similarly to non-virtual social networks.

== See also ==
- Computational linguistics
- Fist bump
- Indexicality
- Lesley Milroy
- Mark Granovetter
- Penelope Eckert
- Social network
- Social network analysis
- Sociolinguistics
- William Labov
