= Phonology (Carr book) =

Book by Philip Carr and Jean-Pierre Montreuil

Phonology: An Introduction
- Author: Philip Carr, Jean-Pierre Montreuil
- Language: English
- Subject: Phonology
- Publisher: Palgrave Macmillan
- Publication date: 1993 (1st ed.), 2013 (2nd ed.)
- Media type: Print (hardcover)

Phonology: An Introduction is a textbook by Philip Carr and Jean-Pierre Montreuil designed for both introductory courses and advanced courses in phonology.

== Reception ==
The book was reviewed by Ken Lodge and Snezhina Dimitrova.
