= Reader (academic rank) =

UK academic rank above senior lecturer

The title of reader in universities in the United Kingdom and some countries in the Commonwealth of Nations such as India, Australia and New Zealand denotes an appointment for a senior academic with a distinguished international reputation for research or scholarship.

In the traditional hierarchy of British and other Commonwealth universities, reader (and principal lecturer in the new universities) is an academic rank above senior lecturer and below Chaired Professor. Comparatively speaking, a reader can be thought of as a professor but without a chair, similar to the distinction which can be found in universities in the United States, China (Hong Kong) and some parts of Europe.

The promotion criteria applied to a readership in the United Kingdom are similar to those applied to a professorship: advancing from senior lecturer to reader generally requires evidence of a distinguished record of original research.

Several UK universities have dispensed with the reader grade, such as the University of Oxford, and the University of Leeds in 2012; those currently holding readerships retain the title, but no new readers will be appointed. In the few UK universities, including the University of Cambridge, that have adopted North American academic titles (i.e. lecturer is equivalent to assistant professor; senior lecturer equivalent to associate professor; professor equivalent to professor), readerships have become assimilated to professorships.

== Denmark, Norway and Sweden ==
In Denmark and Norway, docent was traditionally a title ranking between associate professor and professor, and was virtually identical to a readership in the United Kingdom, although today, the title is used somewhat differently. The traditional Danish/Norwegian docent title is widely translated as reader. Historically, there would often only be one professor (chair) for each institute or discipline, and other academics at the top academic level would be appointed as docents. In Norway all docents became full professors when the docent rank was abolished in 1985.

In Sweden, and countries influenced by Sweden, docent is the highest academic title below that of (chair) Professor, but it is usually not an academic position in itself, but is more like a degree; in this sense it is somewhat comparable to the Habilitation found in certain countries in Continental Europe.

== Associate professor in place of reader ==
At some universities in Commonwealth countries, such as India, Australia, New Zealand, South Africa, Malaysia, Thailand and Ireland, the title associate professor is used in place of reader, and similarly ranks above senior lecturer and below (chair) professor. This associate professor title should not be confused with the associate professor title used in the North American system; like the reader title it ranks higher than an associate professor in the North American system, as the North American associate professor corresponds to the senior lecturer rank in Commonwealth universities. About half as many people hold the full professor title in Commonwealth universities as compared to U.S. universities; hence the reader and associate professor ranks in the Commonwealth system broadly correspond to the lower half of the U.S. full professor rank.

== Comparison ==
Note that some universities in Commonwealth countries have adopted the American system in place of the Commonwealth system.

Commonwealth system	American system
Professor (Chair)	Chair or Distinguished Professor
Reader (mainly UK) or Associate Professor (Australia, NZ, India, Southeast; Asia, South Africa, Ireland)	Professor
Senior Lecturer	Associate Professor
Lecturer	Assistant Professor
Associate Lecturer	Instructor

== Notable examples ==
This rank was the highest academic rank reached by Alan Turing, Chaim Weizmann, Mary Cartwright and Anita Brookner.
