= Rudolf P. Botha =

South African linguist

- Born: 21 March 1942 (age 84); Cape Town, South Africa
- Scientific career
- Fields: linguistics

Rudolf Philip Botha (born 21 March 1942) is a South African linguist. He is emeritus Professor of General Linguistics at Stellenbosch University and Honorary Professor of Linguistics at Utrecht University. Botha is best known for his works on the philosophy of linguistics.

== Books ==
- Unravelling the evolution of language. Elsevier, Amsterdam, etc., 2003.
- Twentieth century conceptions of language: mastering the metaphysics market. Blackwell, Oxford and New York, 1992.
- Challenging Chomsky: the generative garden game. Blackwell, Oxford and New York, 1989. Reprinted in 1991.
- Form and meaning in word formation: a study of Afrikaans reduplication. Cambridge University Press, Cambridge, etc., 1988. Reprinted in 2006.
- Morphological mechanisms: lexicalist analyses of synthetic compounding (Language and Communication Library, Vol. 6). Pergamon Press, Oxford, etc., 1984.
- The conduct of linguistic inquiry: a systematic introduction to the methodology of generative grammar. Mouton/De Gruyter, The Hague, etc., 1981.
- Methodological bases of a progressive mentalism. J. Hintikka (ed.), Synthese, Vol. 44, 1980.
- Inleiding tot generatief taalonderzoek: Een methodologisch handboek. Wolters-Noordhoff, Groningen, 1978.
- The justification of linguistic hypotheses: a study of non-demonstrative inference in transformational grammar, (Janua Linguarum Series Maior, Nr. 84). Mouton Publishers, The Hague and Paris, 1973.
- Methodological aspects of transformational generative phonology, (Janua Linguarum Series Minor, Nr. 112). Mouton Publishers, The Hague and Paris, 1971.
- The methodological status of grammatical argumentation, (Janua Linguarum Series Minor, Nr. 105). Mouton Publishers, The Hague and Paris, 1970.
- The function of the lexicon in transformational generative grammar, (Janua Linguarum Series Maior, Nr. 38). Mouton Publishers, The Hague and Paris, 1968.
