= English Phonology and Phonological Theory =

Book by Roger Lass

English Phonology and Phonological Theory: Synchronic and Diachronic Studies
- Author: Roger Lass
- Language: English
- Subject: phonology
- Publisher: Cambridge
- Publication date: 1976
- Media type: Print (hardcover)
- ISBN: 9780521113243

English Phonology and Phonological Theory: Synchronic and Diachronic Studies is a 1976 book by Roger Lass.

== Reception ==
The book was reviewed by Richard M. Hogg and W. F. Koopman. Hogg believes that "this book may not quite fulfil the high standards which we may demand from this author, but the strengths far outweigh the weaknesses."
