= Aidan Doyle =

Irish linguist (born 1961)

- Born: 1961 (age 64–65)

Academic work
- Discipline: Linguist
- Institutions: University College Cork
- Main interests: Irish language

Aidan Doyle (born 1961) is an Irish linguist whose main area of interest is the Irish language. He graduated from University College Cork (UCC), took his PhD in Linguistics in Poland, and later became a professor at UCC.

== Notable works ==
- Doyle, Aidan; Gussmann, Edmund (1996). A Reverse Dictionary of Modern Irish. Lublin: Wydawnictwo Folium. ISBN 978-83-86239-28-3.
- Doyle, Aidan (2001). Irish. Munich: Lincom Europa. ISBN 978-3-89586-259-5.
- Doyle, Aidan (2015). A History of the Irish Language: From the Norman Invasion to Independence. Oxford: Oxford University Press. ISBN 978-0-19-872475-9.
- Sumner, Natasha; Doyle, Aidan, eds. (2020). North American Gaels: Speech, Story, and Song in the Diaspora. Montreal: McGill–Queen's University Press. ISBN 978-0-2280-0378-6.
