= The Cambridge History of the English Language =

History books about the language English

- Book cover
- Editor: Richard Hogg
- Subject: Comprehensive history of the English language
- Publisher: Cambridge University Press
- Publication date: 1992–2001
- Media type: Print (Hardcover)
- ISBN: 978-0521807586
- OCLC: 23356833

The Cambridge History of the English Language is a six volume history of English published between 1992 and 2001. The general editor was Richard Hogg.

A quarter of a century later, a new, fully-updated version of the resource is now available as The New Cambridge History of the English Language.

== Volumes ==
- Volume 1, The Beginnings to 1066, Richard Hogg, ed.
- Volume 2, 1066–1476, Norman Blake, ed.
- Volume 3, 1476–1776, Roger Lass, ed.
- Volume 4, 1776–1997, Suzanne Romaine, ed.
- Volume 5, English in Britain and Overseas: Origins and Development, Robert Burchfield, ed.
- Volume 6, English in North America, John Algeo, ed.

== See also ==
- The Cambridge History of the Book in Britain
- The Cambridge Grammar of the English Language.
