= Edmund Gussmann =

Polish linguist (1945–2010)

- Born: 27 January 1945; Lubichowo, Poland
- Died: 2 September 2010 (aged 65); Gdynia, Poland

Academic work
- Discipline: Linguist
- Main interests: Phonology

Edmund Gussmann (27 January 1945 – 2 September 2010) was a Polish linguist whose main area of interest was phonology.

== Life ==
He graduated in English Philology from the University of Warsaw in 1968. In the years 1968–1970 he also studied Icelandic and Germanic linguistics at the University of Reykjavik. In 1970, he joined the Maria Curie-Skłodowska University in Lublin, where in 1973 he defended his doctorate, and in 1978 he obtained his habilitation. In the years 1979–1980 he was the Director of the Institute of English Studies at UMCS. In 1981 he became the director of the Institute of English Philology at the Catholic University of Lublin. It was then that he obtained the degree of associate professor. In 1985 he became an associate professor, and in 1992 - a full professor.

== Notable works ==
As sole author:

- Contrastive Polish–English Consonantal Phonology (1978)
- Introduction to Phonological Analysis (1980)
- Studies in Abstract Phonology (1980)
- Phonology: Analysis and Theory (2002)
- Icelandic and Universal Phonology (2005)
- The Phonology of Polish (2007)

With Aidan Doyle:

- An Ghaeilge: Podręcznik do nauki języka irlandzkiego (1991)
- A Reverse Dictionary of Modern Irish (1996)

As editor:

- Phono-morphology: Studies in the Interaction of Phonology and Morphology (1985)
- Rules and the Lexicon: Studies in Word-formation (1987)
- Licensing in Syntax and Phonology (1995)
