= Noel Burton-Roberts =

British linguist

- Born: 22 April 1948 (age 77)
- Education: Kent, Canterbury (BA), University College London (MA), Newcastle University (PhD)
- Scientific career
- Fields: semantics, pragmatics, philosophy of language, English grammar
- Institutions: Newcastle University
- Thesis: Logical presupposition : a re-appraisal of the concept and revision of the theory (1987)
- Doctoral advisor: Jane Heal
- Other academic advisors: Ruth Kempson, Randolph Quirk, Dwight Bolinger
- Website: https://www.ncl.ac.uk/elll/people/profile/noelburton-roberts.html

Noel Burton-Roberts (born 22 April 1948) is a British linguist and Emeritus Professor of English Language and Linguistics at Newcastle University. He is known for work ranging over general and English linguistics: architecture of language, semantics, pragmatics, philosophy of language, and English grammar.

His work on presupposition notably sought to establish that an ambiguity of negation is incompatible with a semantic theory of presupposition and to establish criteria for distinguishing three-valued and gapped two-valued presuppositional logic.

With colleagues (notably the late Philip Carr), Burton-Roberts has developed ‘The Representational Hypothesis’, a view in which particular languages are seen as acquired morpho-phonological systems for the physical (speakable) representation of an innate universal syntactic language of thought.

His introductory textbook, Analysing Sentences (first published, 1986) on descriptive English grammar is used widely across the world.

Burton-Roberts began linguistic work (1971) at University College London, working with Randolph Quirk on The Survey of English Usage. Thereafter, Förstelector at Trondheim University, Norway (1976), Lecturer at Newcastle University (1977). He held the Chair of English Language & Linguistics from 1992 until his retirement in 2014.

== Books ==
- Analysing Sentences: An Introduction to English Syntax, 5th edition 2021
- The Limits to Debate: A Revised Theory of Semantic Presupposition, Cambridge University Press 1989
- Phonological Knowledge: Conceptual and Empirical Issues, with Philip Carr and Gerard Docherty (eds.), Oxford University Press 2000
- Pragmatics (ed.), Palgrave Macmillan 2007
