= Suzanne Romaine =

American linguist

Suzanne Romaine (born 1951) is an American linguist known for work on historical linguistics and sociolinguistics. From 1984 to 2014 she was Merton Professor of English language at the University of Oxford.

== Background and career ==
Romaine was born in Massachusetts in 1951, and received an A.B. magna cum laude in German & Linguistics in 1973 from Bryn Mawr College; she then received a master's degree in Phonetics & Linguistics at the University of Edinburgh, Scotland in 1975) and a PhD in linguistics at the University of Birmingham in 1981. Since 1984 she has been Merton Professor of English Language at the University of Oxford.

== Research ==
Romaine's research has focused primarily on historical linguistics and sociolinguistics, especially problems of societal multilingualism, linguistic diversity, language change, language acquisition, and language contact. Other areas of interest include corpus linguistics, language and gender, literacy, and bilingual/immersion education. She has conducted fieldwork on the language of working class schoolchildren in Scotland, on patterns of bilingualism and language loss among Punjabi speakers in England, on the language of rural and urban schoolchildren in Papua New Guinea, and also in Hawaii.

Her 1982 monograph Socio-historical Linguistics; Its Status and Methodology, correlates linguistic variation with external factors as found in historical data, and is regarded as beginning, or laying the foundation for, the field of sociohistorical linguistics as a sub-discipline.

== Honors and awards ==
In 1998 she was awarded an honorary doctorate from the University of Tromsø in Norway, and in 1999 she was awarded one from Uppsala University in Sweden. She has been a member of the Finnish Academy of Sciences from 2010 on, and is a member of the Norwegian Academy of Science and Letters.

She was the editor of the fourth volume of The Cambridge History of the English Language.

== Publications ==
- Socio-historical Linguistics; Its Status and Methodology Cambridge: Cambridge University Press, 1982
- The Language of Children and Adolescents; The acquisition of communicative competence Oxford: Blackwell, 1984
- Pidgin and Creole Languages London: Longman, 1988
- Bilingualism Oxford: Blackwell, 1989. Second revised edition 1995. Nominated for the British Association for Applied Linguistics Book of the Year.
- Language, Education and Development; Urban and Rural Tok Pisin in Papua New Guinea Oxford: Oxford University Press, 1992
- Language in Society. An Introduction to Sociolinguistics Oxford: Oxford University Press, 1994. Second revised edition 2000.
- Communicating Gender Mahwah, NJ: Lawrence Erlbaum, 1999
- (with Daniel Nettle) Vanishing Voices; The Extinction of the World's Languages New York: Oxford University Press, 2000. (Winner of the British Association for Applied Linguistics Book of the Year Prize 2001.)
