= Ken Lodge =

British linguist

- Born: 1943
- Education: University of East Anglia (PhD)
- Scientific career
- Fields: linguistics
- Institutions: University of East Anglia
- Thesis: Modality and the modal verbs in English and German (1974)
- Academic advisors: Sir John Lyons, Harry Kirkwood

Kenneth Rupert Lodge (born 1943) is a British linguist and Emeritus Reader in Linguistics and Phonetics at the University of East Anglia. He is best known for his works on phonetics and phonology.

== Books ==
- A Critical Introduction to Phonetics, 2009, Continuum.
- Fundamental Concepts in Phonology: Sameness and Difference, 2009, Edinburgh University Press.
- The German Language, Lodge, K., Boase-Beier, J., Lodge, K. & Boase-Beier, J. (ed.), 2003, Wiley.
