= James Milroy =

British linguist (1933–2017)

James Robert Dunlop Milroy (1933–2017) was a British linguist who pioneered the development of sociolinguistics.

He was born in Portpatrick in Scotland, but grew up in Scotland, Wales and Surrey, and as a child he learned Welsh. He taught at several British universities before obtaining a teaching position at Queen's University Belfast where in 1965 he met his wife Lesley with whom he began carrying out sociolinguistics research on English dialects. In 1981 he became Chair of The Linguistics Science Department at the University of Sheffield, then moved to Newcastle University, and then taught for 10 years at the University of Michigan.

Most of his research was carried out with his wife Lesley; they coauthored the two highly influential books: Authority in Language and Real English: the grammar of English dialects in the British Isles. James R. D. Milroy wrote: Linguistic variation and change: on the historical sociolinguistics of English as well as many journal articles.
