= Philip J. Carr =

American anthropologist

- Born: 1966 (age 58–59)
- Education: University of Tennessee (MA, PhD), University of Louisville (BA)
- Scientific career
- Institutions: University of South Alabama

Philip J. Carr (born 1966) is an American anthropologist and Chief Calvin McGhee Endowed Professor of Native American Studies at the University of South Alabama. He is known for his works on North American prehistory.

== Books ==
- Contemporary Lithic Analysis in the Southeast: Problems, Solutions, and Interpretations. The University of Alabama Press
- Signs of Power: The Rise of Cultural Complexity in the Southeast. The University of Alabama Pres
