= Esa Itkonen =

Finnish linguist

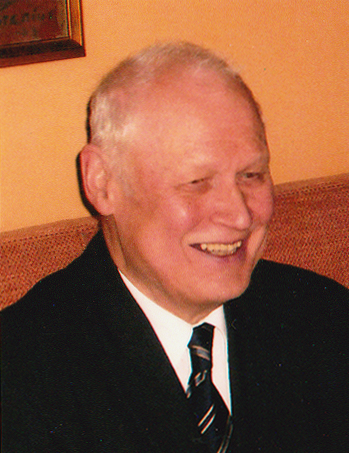
Esa Itkonen

Esa Itkonen (born 3 January 1944) is a Finnish linguist, philosopher and language theorist. He is professor emeritus of general linguistics at the University of Turku. Itkonen has authored several publications on linguistic methodology, philosophy of linguistics, history of linguistics, and linguistic typology. He has defended a humanist approach to linguistics, criticising sociobiology, generative grammar, and Cognitive Linguistics.

== Career ==
Esa Itkonen earned his PhD at the University of Helsinki in 1974. He was Professor of general linguistics at the University of Turku from 1982 to 2012 and Docent of philosophy at the University of Jyväskylä from 1988 to 2012.

== Linguistic theory ==
In his 2005 book Analogy as Structure and Process, Itkonen argues that analogy is the most central concept in language formation. He proposes a distinction between analogy as structure, referring to a static relation between different systems; and analogy as process, or a dynamism which produces analogical structures. According to Itkonen, various forms of analogical reasoning are hidden behind other terminology in the study of language and other cognitive domains.

== Books in English ==
- (1975) Concerning the Relationship between Linguistics and Logic. University of Helsinki.
- (1976) Linguistics and Empiricalness : Answers to Criticisms. University of Helsinki. ISBN 9789514508905
- (1978) Grammatical Theory and Metascience : A Critical Investigation into the Methodological and Philosophical Foundations of "Autonomous" Linguistics. John Benjamins. ISBN 9027209065
- (1983) Causality in Linguistic Theory : A Critical Investigation into the Philosophical and Methodological Foundations of 'Non-Autonomous Linguistics'. Indiana University Press. ISBN 0253313252
- (1991) Universal History of Linguistics : India, China, Arabia, Europe. John Benjamins. ISBN 9789027277671
- (2003) Methods of Formalization beside and inside Both Autonomous and Non-autonomous Linguistics. University of Turku. ISBN 9512924854
- (2003) What Is Language? : A Study in the Philosophy of Linguistics. University of Turku. ISBN 9512926172
- (2005) Analogy as Structure and Process : Approaches in Linguistic, Cognitive Psychology, and Philosophy of Science. John Benjamins. ISBN 9789027294012
- (2005) Ten Non-European Languages : An Aid to the Typologist. University of Turku. ISBN 9789512927692
