= John Algeo =

Linguist and Theosophist

- Born: November 12, 1930; St. Louis, Missouri
- Died: October 13, 2019 (aged 88); Bowling Green, Kentucky
- Spouse: Adele Silbereisen (died 2010)

Academic background
- Education: University of Florida (PhD, 1960)

Academic work
- Institutions: University of Georgia
- Notable works: Origins and Development of the English Language

John Algeo (1930–2019) was an American academic, trained as a linguist, and the author of one of the standard American textbooks on the history of the English language.

He was also a Theosophist and a Freemason. He was the Vice President of the Theosophical Society Adyar and, was a Professor Emeritus of English at the University of Georgia.

== Biography ==
Algeo was born in St Louis, Missouri. He joined the army and served in the Korean War and became a sergeant. He married Adele Silbereisen in 1958. He earned a Bachelor of Education degree from the University of Miami in 1955, and Master of Arts (1957) and Doctor of Philosophy (1960) degrees from the University of Florida. He was an instructor at Florida State University from 1959 to 1961. He returned to the University of Florida in 1961 as an assistant professor of English, becoming an associate professor in 1966, assistant dean of the graduate school in 1969 and a full professor in 1970. Algeo moved to the University of Georgia in 1971 as a professor of English. He was chair of the English department from 1975 until 1979. He became professor emeritus in 1994.

John Algeo was national president of the Theosophical Society America in 1993, president of the American Dialect Society, 1979, president of the Dictionary Society of North America, 1995–97, president of the American Name Society, 1984, editor of American Speech, 1969–82, and editor of Quest magazine, 1995.

John Algeo died October 13, 2019, in Bowling Green, Kentucky.

== Books ==
=== Linguistics and philology ===
- English: An Introduction to English. Harcourt, Brace & World. 1970. With Thomas Pyles.
- Spelling: Sound to Letters. MacMillan Company. 1971. With Ralph Williams, Judith Patton Hudson and Margaret Farcas.
- On Defining the Proper Name. Gainesville, Florida: University of Florida Press. 1973.
- A Concise Grammar of Contemporary English: Exercises in Contemporary English. Harcourt, Brace, Jovanovich. 1973. ISBN 9780155129306. With Randolph Quirk and Sidney Greenbaum.
- Exercises in Contemporary English. Harcourt, Brace, Jovanovich. 1974.
- Thomas Pyles: Selected Essays on English Usage. Gainesville, Florida: University Presses of Florida. 1979. Editor.
- Fifty Years among the New Words: A Dictionary of Neologisms 1941-1991. Cambridge: Cambridge University Press. 1991. ISBN 9780521413770. Editor, with Adele S. Algeo.
- The Cambridge History of the English Language, Volume VI, English in North America. Cambridge: Cambridge University Press. 2001. ISBN 9781139053822. Editor.
- Problems in the Origins and Development of the English Language. Boston: Wadsworth Publishing Company. 2004. ISBN 9780155070530. With Carmen Acevedo Butcher.
- British American Grammatical Differences. New York: Cambridge University Press. 2004.
- The Origins and Development of the English Language (6th ed.). Boston: Wadsworth. 2005. ISBN 978-1-4282-3145-0.
- British or American English? A Handbook of Word and Grammar Patterns. Cambridge University Press. 2006.

=== Theosophy ===
- Getting Acquainted with the Secret Doctrine. ISBN 978-0-8356-0209-9.
- Blavatsky, Helena Petrovna (January 2003). The Letters of H. P. Blavatsky Volume I 1861-1879. Quest Books. ISBN 978-0-8356-0836-7. Editor.
- Algeo, John; Nicholson, Shirley J. (July 2001). The Power of Thought: A Twenty-First Century Adaptation of Annie Besant's Classic work, Thought Power. Quest Books. ISBN 978-0-8356-0797-1. With Shirley Nicholson.
- Algeo, John (December 2006). Theosophy - An Introductory Study Course. Theosophical Publishing House. ISBN 978-0-8356-0190-0.
- Algeo, John (2001). Unlocking the Door: Studies in the Key to Theosophy. Olcott Institute of the Theosophical Society in America. ISBN 978-0-8356-0812-1.
- Reincarnation Explored. Theosophical Publishing House. 1987.
