= Phonology: An Introduction to Basic Concepts =

Book by Roger Lass

- Author: Roger Lass
- Language: English
- Subject: phonology
- Publisher: Cambridge
- Publication date: 1984
- Media type: Print (hardcover)
- ISBN: 9780521281836

Phonology: An Introduction to Basic Concepts is a 1984 book by Roger Lass designed for an introductory course in phonology.

== Reception ==
The book was reviewed by Richard Coates, Larry M. Hyman, John R. Rennison and Ellen Broselow.
