= Phonology: Analysis and Theory =

Book by Edmund Gussmann

- Author: Edmund Gussmann
- Language: English
- Subject: Phonology
- Publisher: Cambridge University Press
- Publication date: 2002
- Media type: Print (hardcover)
- Pages: 234
- ISBN: 9780521574280

Phonology: Analysis and Theory is a 2002 book by Edmund Gussmann designed for an introductory course in phonology.

== Reception ==
The book was reviewed by Gunnar Ólafur Hansson, Ken Lodge and Zoe Toft.
