= Marilyn Vihman =

American linguist

- Born: 1939 (age 86–87)
- Citizenship: American
- Spouse: Eero Vihman

Academic background
- Education: Bryn Mawr College (BA); University of California, Berkeley (PhD)
- Thesis: Livonian Phonology, with an Appendix on Stod in Danish and Livonian (1971)
- Doctoral advisor: Karl Zimmer

Academic work
- Discipline: Linguist
- Sub-discipline: Language acquisition
- Institutions: University of York

Marilyn May Vihman (born 1939) is an American linguist known for her research on phonological development and bilingualism in early childhood. She holds the position of Professor of Linguistics at the University of York.

Vihman is widely cited as an expert on language development. Her views on infant babbling and the transition to intelligible, meaningful language have reached the mainstream media attention, including The New York Times, and The Guardian. According to Vihman, infant babbling paves the way to language as "kind of a predictor for being able to get word forms under control, so that you can make words that people will recognize.”

== Education ==
Vihman received her B.A. degree in Russian at Bryn Mawr College in 1961. She attended graduate school at the University of California, Berkeley where she obtained her Ph.D in Linguistics in 1971 under the supervision of Karl Zimmer. Her dissertation titled Livonian Phonology, with an Appendix on Stod in Danish and Livonian, focused on Livonian, a critically endangered Finno-Ugric language that is closely related to Estonian. Vihman received post-doctoral training at the Stanford Child Phonology Project, where she worked under the direction of Charles A. Ferguson. Vihman's research with Ferguson emphasized individual differences and variability in infant babbling and first words, up to the point of having a 50-word vocabulary.

== Career ==
From 1980 to 1989, Vihman was Director of the Child Phonology Program at Stanford University. While at Stanford, Vihman conducted longitudinal research on six French-speaking infants in the late single-word period (approximate ages 10–18 months), with the dataset made publicly available through PhonBank and CHILDES. Vihman was also involved in creating the reference manual and user's guide for the Stanford Phonology Archive.

Vihman was Associate Professor of Special Education at Southeastern Louisiana University from 1993 to 1995 and Professor of Developmental Psychology at Bangor University from 1996 to 2006. She moved to her current position at the University of York in 2007. Her research on various topics in language acquisition, such as the effects of input on early word learning, late talking toddlers, phonological acquisition in multilingual settings, and production templates in phonological and lexical development, has been funded through grants from the Economic and Social Research Council of the United Kingdom.

== Books ==
Vihman is the author of Phonological Development: The Origins of Language in the Child and the later edition Phonological Development: The First Two Years, which offer a functionalist perspective on child phonology and the emergence of referential language. In her most recent book Phonological Templates in Development, Vihman adopts a dynamic systems perspective, emphasizing the role of templates, or preferred word forms, in early lexical development. Vihman proposes infants are initially attracted to words with sounds they can say. If a word corresponds to a syllable that the infant already has in their repertoire, they will start making that syllable when the situation recurs and thus produce their first recognizable words.

Vihman co-edited the volume The Emergence of Phonology: Whole-word Approaches and Cross-linguistic Evidence with her former postdoc Tamar Keren-Portnoy.

== Personal ==
Vihman met her husband, linguist Eero Vihman, in 1962. Eero taught her Estonian, and together they raised their children Virve-Anneli and Raivo Vihman in California while communicating almost exclusively in Estonian at home. Raivo's bilingual development has been featured in academic articles, and cited as an example of language mixing in infant bilingualism. Virve-Anneli Vihman is a member of the faculty of the Institute of Estonian and General Linguistics at the University of Tartu; she collaborated with her mother on a case study of early phonological development.

== Selected articles ==
- Vihman, M. M. (1981). Phonology and the development of the lexicon: Evidence from children's errors. Journal of Child Language, 8(2), 239–264.
- Vihman, M. M. (1985). Language differentiation by the bilingual infant. Journal of Child Language, 12(2), 297–324.
- Vihman, M. M. (1993). Variable paths to early word production. Journal of Phonetics, 21(1-2), 61–82.
- Vihman, M. M. (2017). Learning words and learning sounds: Advances in language development. British Journal of Psychology, 108(1), 1-27.
- Vihman M. & Croft W. (2007). Phonological development: Towards a “radical” templatic phonology. Linguistics, 45(4), 683–725.
- Vihman, M. M. & McCune, L. (1994). When is a word a word? Journal of Child Language, 21(3), 517–542.
