= Raymond Hickey =

Irish linguist (born 1954)

- Born: Raymond Kevin Hickey; 3 June 1954 (age 72); Dublin, Ireland

Academic background
- Education: Trinity College Dublin

Academic work
- Discipline: Linguistics
- Sub-discipline: Language Contact, Language Typology (Irish), Sociolinguistics, Varieties of English
- Institutions: University of Bonn, LMU Munich, University of Duisburg-Essen

Raymond Kevin Hickey (born 3 June 1954) is an Irish linguist specialising in the English language in Ireland, especially in the capital Dublin, working within the sociolinguistic paradigm of language variation and change. Hickey has also worked on the Irish language, specifically the phonology of the modern language. For both Irish and English in Ireland he has carried out extensive fieldwork for over three decades.

Hickey's research also covers the wider field of varieties of English – in particular their historical development and spread overseas during the colonial period. In this context he has focused on language contact, areal linguistics and language typology, as well as the history of English, both the development of its phonology and the language in the eighteenth century which led to the standardisation of English.

Outside his own professional context Hickey frequently discusses linguistic issues and has been an invited guest on Irish radio and in Irish newspapers, such as The Irish Times in particular to comment on language attitudes and/or change and their relevance to society in general.

== Education and career ==
Hickey studied German and Italian at Trinity College, Dublin and after attaining his M.A. moved to Kiel University, Germany, where he completed his PhD in 1980. He was awarded his second doctorate degree (German: Habilitation) in 1985 at the University of Bonn where he was appointed professor of English linguistics in 1987. In 1991 he moved to LMU Munich, then in 1993 to the University of Bayreuth and the following year to the University of Essen (since 2003 the University of Duisburg-Essen) where he held the chair for General Linguistics and Varieties of English until 2020. He is currently Adjunct Professor at the Faculty of Arts, Humanities and Social Sciences of the University of Limerick, Ireland. Hickey has been visiting professor at a number of international universities and is on the editorial board of several journals. His book publications have been and continue with major publishing houses such as Cambridge University Press, Oxford University Press, Wiley-Blackwell, de Gruyter Mouton and John Benjamins.

== Research contributions ==
Among the contributions he has made to linguistic research is the notion of supraregionalisation by which is meant the rise of a non-local form of language used across a broad section of society and expressing its linguistic identity. He has also tracked the sociolinguistically motivated change in Dublin English over the past three decades and compiled a Corpus of Irish English with appropriate software. In the area of Irish phonology, Hickey has devised a maximally concise system of description which captures many linguistically valid generalisations about the sound structure of that language. More generally he has been concerned with internal and external factors in language change, the course of such change and the complex of new dialect formation. Among his recent research foci have been life-span changes and 'bad data', fragmentary data from poorly documented sources which nonetheless can provide insights into language change. The study of areal features, those shared by languages or varieties in geographically delimited regions, also received impetus from his research and this field of language contact and change.

In 2020 Hickey was appointed the general editor of the New Cambridge History of the English Language. This comprehensive work in six volumes is intended to reflect recent research insights as well as new theories and methods in English historical linguistics. Here Hickey has emphasised that the history of English is a series of 'streams' which arose during the colonial period at several locations throughout the world and led to the rise of different standards of the language, e.g. in Canada, South Africa or New Zealand, all of which are independent of, though related to the standard of English in Britain.

With the book Life and Language Beyond Earth Hickey has offered a broad-based, interdisciplinary consideration of whether intelligent forms of life might exist on exoplanets and be, in principle, able to engage in interstellar contact. Covering issues from astronomy, evolutionary biology, paleoanthropology, neuroscience and linguistics, the book assesses the likelihood of intelligent exolife arising and how systems of communication, functionally comparable to human language, might develop on other planets with conditions and environments similar to those on Earth. The book garnered praise from the Astronomer Royal, Lord Martin Rees, describing the book as ‘bringing astronomy and linguistics together'.

In 2019 a festschrift appeared for Hickey, Processes of Change: Studies in Late Modern and Present-Day English, edited by Sandra Jansen and Lucia Siebers, with contributions concentrating on recent changes in varieties of English.

== Publications ==
=== Monographs ===
- Hickey, Raymond 2023. Life and Language Beyond Earth. Cambridge: Cambridge University Press, xxiii + 671 pages.
- Hickey, Raymond 2023. The Sounds of English Worldwide. Malden, MA: Wiley- Blackwell, xiii + 432 pages.
- Hickey, Raymond 2014. A Dictionary of Varieties of English. Malden, MA: Wiley- Blackwell, xxviii + 456 pages.
- Hickey, Raymond 2014. The Sound Structure of Modern Irish. Berlin: de Gruyter Mouton, xiii + 481 pages.
- Hickey, Raymond 2011. The Dialects of Irish, Study of a Changing Landscape. Berlin: de Gruyter Mouton, 508 pages + DVD.
- Hickey, Raymond 2007. Irish English. History and Present-day Forms. Cambridge: Cambridge University Press, xx + 504 pages.
- Hickey, Raymond 2005. Dublin English. Evolution and Change. Amsterdam: John Benjamins, 291 pages + CD-ROM.
- Hickey, Raymond 2004. A Sound Atlas of Irish English. Berlin: Mouton de Gruyter, 171 pages + DVD.
- Hickey, Raymond 2003. Corpus Presenter. Software for language analysis. With a manual and A Corpus of Irish English as sample data. Amsterdam: John Benjamins, 292 pages with CD-ROM.
- Hickey, Raymond 2002. A Source Book for Irish English. Amsterdam: John Benjamins, xii + 541 pages.
- Several computer books about database management systems.
- Hickey, Raymond 1980. Satzstrukturen des Deutschen und Englischen, eine kontrastive Analyse im Rahmen der Dependenzgrammatik. [Sentence structures in German and English, a contrastive analysis within the framework of dependency grammar]. PhD thesis, University of Kiel.

=== Edited volumes ===
- Hickey, Raymond (general ed.) 2025/6. The New Cambridge History of the English Language. 6 vols. Cambridge: Cambridge University Press.
- Hickey, Raymond (ed.) 2020. English in Multilingual South Africa. The Linguistics of Contact and Change. Cambridge: Cambridge University Press.
- Hickey, Raymond (ed.) 2020. English in the German-speaking World. Cambridge: Cambridge University Press.
- Hickey, Raymond (ed.) 2020. The Handbook of Language Contact. Second edition. Malden, MA: Wiley-Blackwell.
- Hickey, Raymond and Carolina P. Amador Moreno (eds) 2020. Irish Identities. Sociolinguisitic Perspectives. Berlin/Boston: de Gruyter Mouton.
- Hickey, Raymond (eds) 2019. Keeping in Touch. Familiar Letters across the English-speaking World. Amsterdam: John Benjamins.
- Hickey, Raymond (ed.) 2017. The Cambridge Handbook of Areal Linguistics. Cambridge: Cambridge University Press, xxviii + 1005 pages.
- Hickey, Raymond (ed.) 2017. Listening to the Past. Audio Records of Accents of English. Cambridge: Cambridge University Press, xxxii + 574 pages.
- Hickey, Raymond and Elaine Vaughan (eds) 2017. Irish English. Special issue of World Englishes 36.2. Malden, MA: Wiley.
- Hickey, Raymond (ed.) 2016. Sociolinguistics in Ireland. Basingstoke: Palgrave Macmillan, 420 pages.
- Hickey, Raymond (ed.) 2015. Researching Northern English. Amsterdam: John Benjamins, 483 pages.
- Hickey, Raymond (ed.) 2012. Areal Features of the Anglophone World. Berlin: de Gruyter Mouton, 503 pages.
- Hickey, Raymond (ed.) 2012. Standards of English. Codified Varieties around the World. Cambridge: Cambridge University Press, 421 pages.
- Hickey, Raymond (ed.) 2011. Irish English in Today's World. Special issue of English Today 27.2, June 2011. Cambridge: Cambridge University Press.
- Hickey, Raymond (ed.) 2011. Researching the Languages of Ireland. Uppsala: Uppsala University, 351 pages.
- Hickey, Raymond (ed.) 2010. The Handbook of Language Contact. Malden, MA: Wiley- Blackwell, 863 pages.
- Hickey, Raymond (ed.) 2010. Eighteenth-Century English. Ideology and Change. Cambridge: Cambridge University Press, 426 pages.
- Hickey, Raymond (ed.) 2010. Varieties of English in Writing. The Written Word as Linguistic Evidence. Amsterdam: John Benjamins, 378 pages.
- Hickey, Raymond (ed.) 2004. Legacies of Colonial English. Studies in Transported Dialects. Cambridge: Cambridge University Press, 712 pages.
- Hickey, Raymond (ed.) 2003. Motives for Language Change. Cambridge: Cambridge University Press, 286 pages.
- Hickey, Raymond (ed.) 2002. Collecting Views on Language Change. A Donation to Roger Lass on his 65th Birthday. Special volume of Language Sciences 24.3-4. Amsterdam: Elsevier, 302 pages.
- Hickey, Raymond and Stanisław Puppel (eds) 1997. Language History and Linguistic Modelling. A Festschrift for Jacek Fisiak on his 60th Birthday. Berlin: Mouton de Gruyter, 2 vols., 2121 pages.
- Hickey, Raymond, Merja Kytö, Ian Lancashire and Matti Rissanen (eds) 1997. Tracing the Trail of Time. Proceedings of the conference on diachronic corpora, Toronto, May 1995. Amsterdam: Rodopi.

=== Articles/chapters ===
Over 200 articles in various linguistic journals and chapters in edited volumes.

== Author's websites ==
- Raymond Hickey's homepage
- Irish English Resource Centre
- Variation and Change in Dublin English
- Studying Varieties of English
- Studying the History of English
- Discover Irish
- Sounds of Irish

== See also ==
- Sociolinguistics
- Standard English
- Language contact
- Irish English
- Irish
