= Lesley Milroy =

British linguist (born 1944)

Ann Lesley Milroy (born March 5, 1944, in Newcastle upon Tyne, UK) is a sociolinguist, and a professor emerita at the University of Michigan. Her work in sociolinguistics focuses on urban and rural dialectology, language ideology and standard.

== Education and career ==
Milroy earned her PhD at Queens University Belfast in 1979. She studied and began her work in sociolinguistics in the UK. Milroy held a position at the University of Newcastle upon Tyne from 1983 to 1994. She moved to the United States in 1994, where she worked as a professor and the chair of the department of linguistics at the University of Michigan until she retired in 2004. She has since done some sociolinguistic teaching and lecturing at Oxford University.

== Contributions to sociolinguistics ==
Milroy's most famous work examined social networks and linguistic variation in Belfast in the 1970s. Much of her work has been carried out conjointly with her husband James Milroy, and the two are co-authors to two widely influential books about English sociolinguistics and dialectology. In addition, she has written over seven books and fifteen journal articles, worked as an editorial board member for several research journals, and lectured around the world on her research.

Detailed presentation of her research on social networks is found at this link: social networks.

== Selected publications ==
Lesley Milroy. 1980. Language and social networks. Oxford: Blackwell.

Milroy, Lesley, and James Milroy. 1992. Social Network and Social Class: Toward an Integrated Sociolinguistic Model. Language in Society 21: 1–26. JSTOR 4168309.

Milroy, Lesley. 2001. Social networks. In Rajend Mesthrie (ed.). Concise encyclopedia of sociolinguistics. Amsterdam: Elsevier Science, 370–6.

Milroy, Lesley. 2002. Social networks. In Jack Chambers, Peter Trudgill & Schilling-Estes, Natalie (eds.). The handbook of language variation and change. Oxford: Blackwell, 549–573.

Milroy, James, and Lesley Milroy. 2012. Authority in Language: Investigating Standard English. Routledge. ISBN 9780415696838
