= Academic ranks in the United Kingdom =

National set of academic ranks

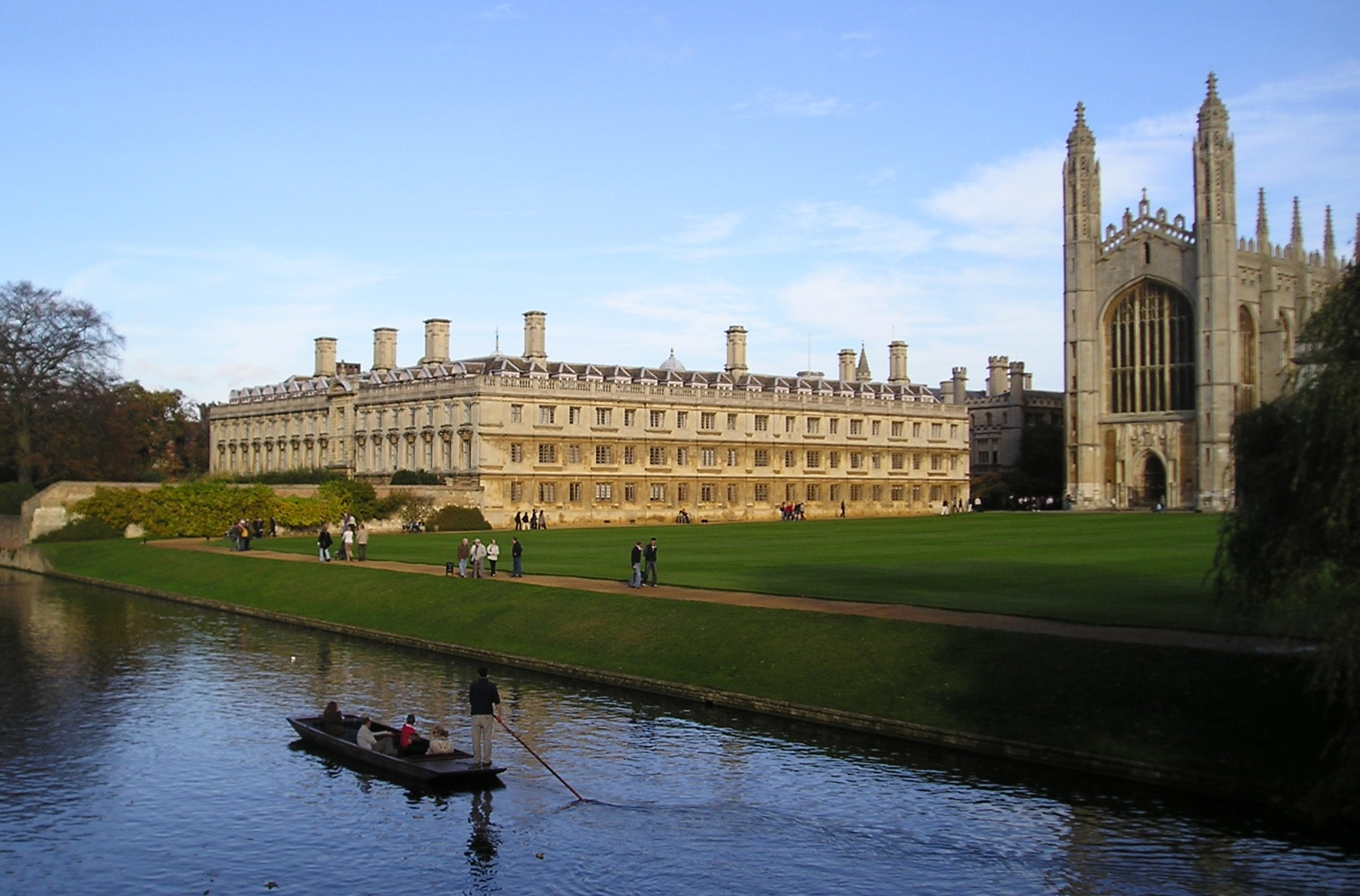
The Backs at Cambridge

Academic ranks in the United Kingdom are the titles, relative seniority and responsibility of academic staff employed in universities. In general the country has three academic career pathways: one focused on research, one on teaching, and one that combines the two.

== Professors ==
In the United Kingdom, like most Commonwealth countries (excluding Australia and Canada), as well as in Ireland, traditionally a professor held either an established chair or a personal chair. An established chair is created by the university to meet its needs for academic leadership and standing in a particular area or discipline and the post is filled from a shortlist of applicants; only a suitably qualified person will be appointed. A personal chair is awarded specifically to an individual in recognition of their high levels of achievements and standing in their particular area or discipline.

In most universities, professorships are reserved for only the most senior academic staff, and other academics are generally known as 'lecturers', 'senior lecturers' and 'readers' (in some Commonwealth countries such as Australia, New Zealand and South Africa, the title 'associate professor' can be used instead of 'reader'). In some countries, senior lecturers are generally paid the same as readers, but the latter title is awarded primarily for research excellence, and traditionally carries higher prestige. Traditionally, heads of departments and other senior academic leadership roles within a university were undertaken by professors.

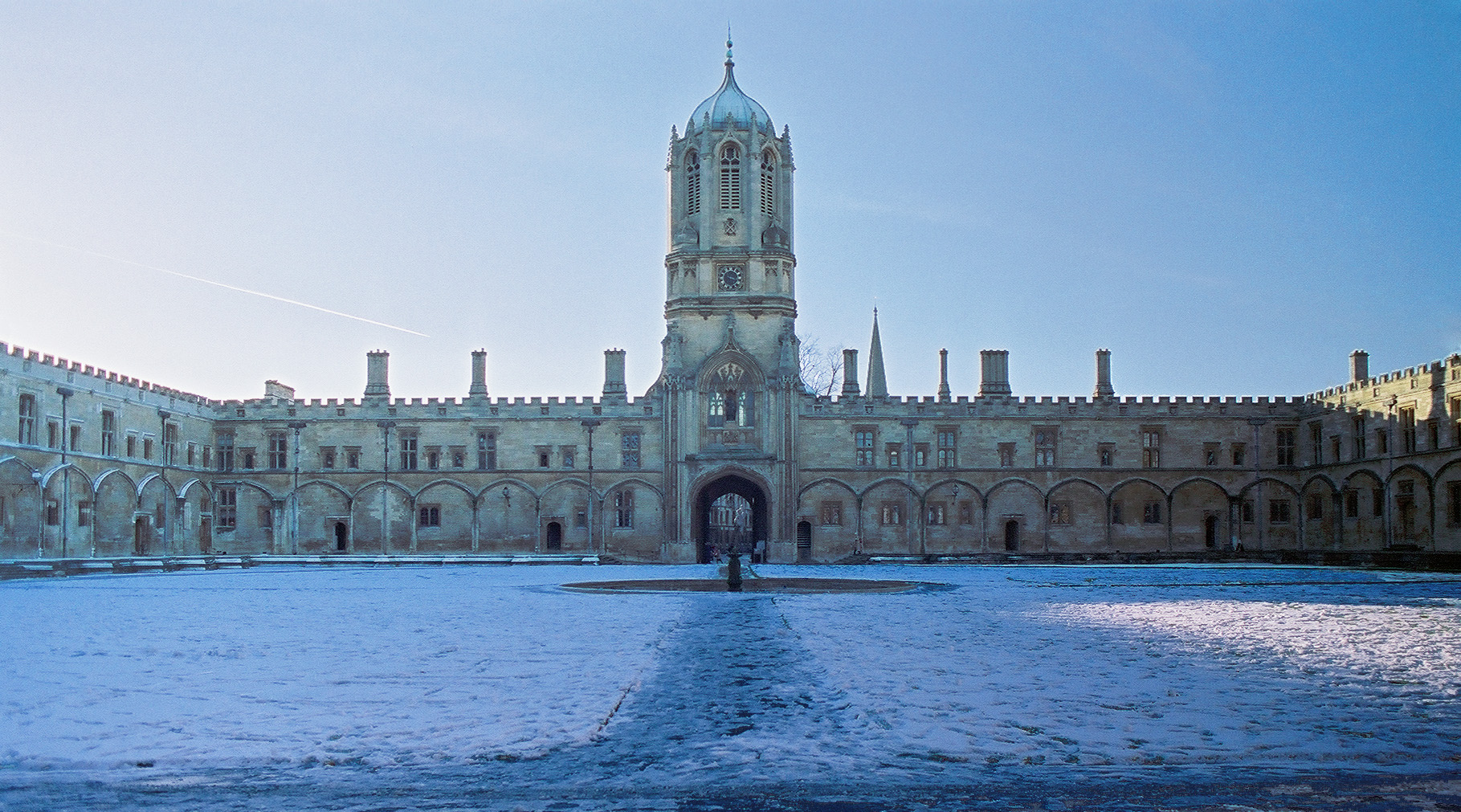
Christ Church, University of Oxford

During the 1990s, however, the University of Oxford introduced Titles of Distinction, enabling their holders to be termed professors or readers while holding academic posts at the level of lecturer. This results in a two-tier professoriate, with statutory professors – or named chairs – having higher status than the relatively recently created category of titular professors. Similar hierarchies among the professoriate exist in a small number of other UK universities. Some universities, including the University of Exeter, University of Reading, University of Warwick, Staffordshire University, Swansea University, University of Birmingham and Kingston University have adopted the style of 'associate professor' in lieu of 'reader'. The varied practices these changes have brought about have meant that academic ranks in the United Kingdom and in Australia are no longer quite as consistent as they once were.

In 2021, the University of Cambridge introduced a new structure. The academic rank structure is superseded by the new structure.

Reformed academic rank structure of the University of Cambridge
Previous structure	New structure	Grade
Professor	Professor	12
Reader	Professor	11
University Senior Lecturer	Associate Professor	10
University Lecturer (post‑probation)	Associate Professor	9
University Lecturer (pre‑probation)	Assistant Professor	9

In the UK the title 'Professor' has historically been reserved for full professors, with lecturers, senior lecturers, and readers generally addressed by their academic qualification (Dr for the holder of a doctorate, Mr/Mrs/Miss/Ms/Mx otherwise). However, the current University of Oxford Style Guide now notes that Associate Professors "may, if they wish, use the title of ‘Professor’, or they may keep their previous title of ‘Dr’. As in the USA, the title of 'professor emeritus' may be awarded to a retired or former professor, who may well retain formal or informal links with the institution where the chair was formerly held.

=== Named professorships ===
Many professorships are named in honour of a distinguished person or after the person who endowed the chair. Some chairs have a long history and considerable prestige attached, such as the Gresham professorships, which date back to the 16th century, Regius professorships, and the Lucasian Professor of Mathematics. Some academic societies and professional institutions also award or designate certain post holders or members as 'professor'; these are usually personal awards. The College of Teachers, formerly the College of Preceptors, is a long-standing example of this, as are the amalgamated bodies included in the Society of Teachers in Business Education.

=== Professors of music ===
Instructors at many music conservatoires in the UK are known as professors; for example 'professor of violin'. In the United Kingdom and Ireland the term 'professor' is properly and in formal situations given to singing and instrumental tutors in the music colleges / conservatoires of music, usually the older and more august ones: the Royal College of Music, the Royal Academy of Music, and Trinity College of Music. The expression has become almost obsolete for singing and instrumental tuition in the universities. The same convention applies throughout Europe in the National Colleges of Music.

== Pathways ==
=== Research and teaching career pathway ===
Academic staff whose responsibilities encompass both research and teaching:

- Professor
- Reader (or principal lecturer in some post-1992 institutions)
- Senior lecturer (not all universities have this title)
- Lecturer or clinical lecturer: this is largely equivalent to an 'Assistant Professor' rank at a US university
- Assistant lecturer, demonstrator, seminar leader, associate lecturer, graduate teaching assistant

However, it is becoming increasingly common for Russell Group universities to use some form of hybrid terminology: LSE has adopted the American terminology entirely, while UCL has retained the role of lecturer, but replaced senior lecturer and reader with associate professor.

=== Research and teaching career pathway at the University of Oxford ===
Specific to the University of Oxford:

- Professor (professors and other title holders (university lecturers, senior research fellows, etc.) with a titular professorship)
- (Reader) (Oxford has abolished this grade with no new appointments to this title)
- Professor of Practice (Said Business School and Blavatnik School of Government have introduced 'practice' faculty roles. These posts are held by academics with a weighting toward teaching, especially executive education, but research and publishing are also required. Some faculty are appointed to the similar roles of Senior Fellow in Management Practice and Fellow in Management Practice),
- Associate professor (university lecturers and other title holders with a titular associate professorship)
- Departmental lecturer (non-ladder faculty position employed or paid by the university)

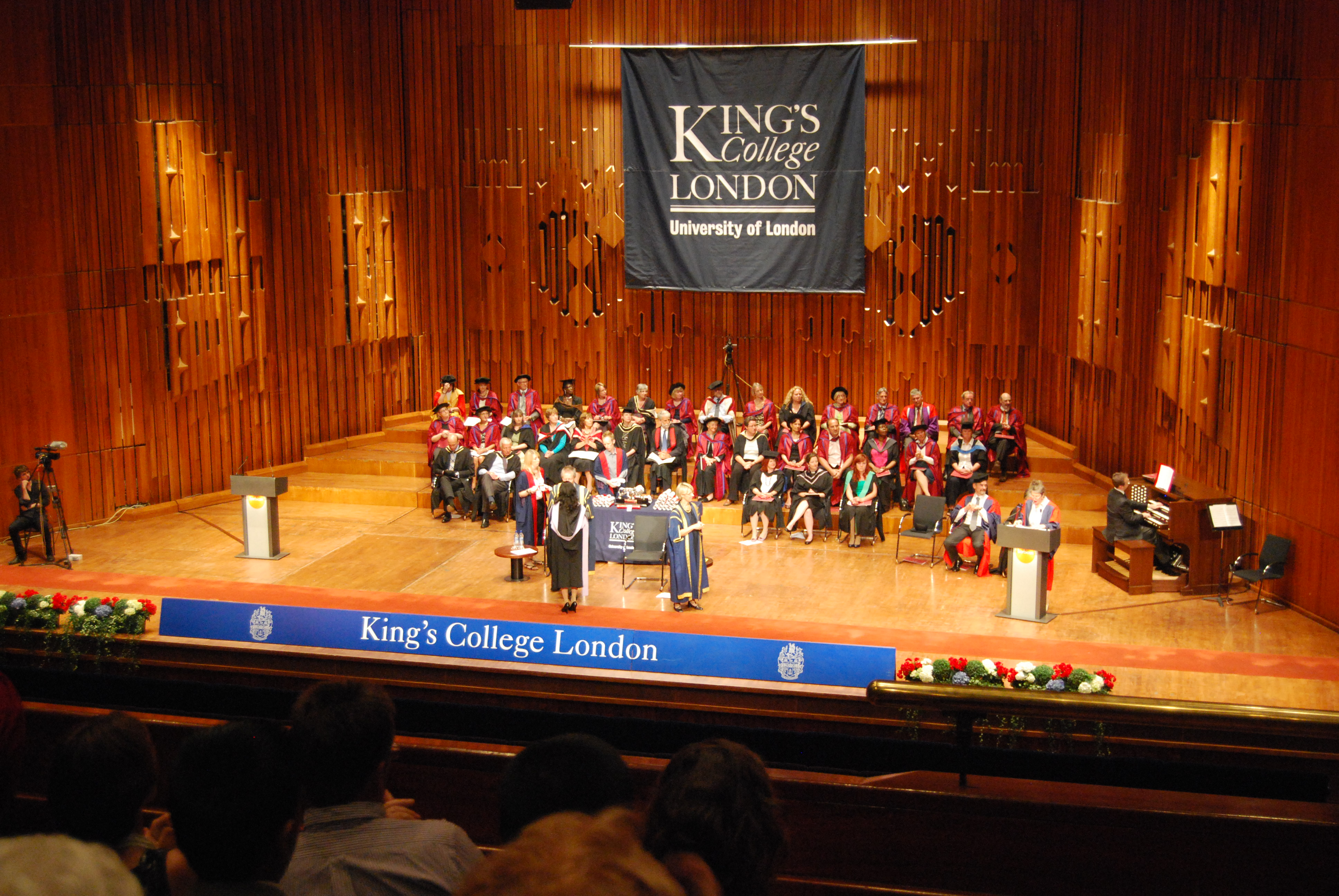
Academics of King's College London of University of London, ranging from professors to lecturers, in their academic regalia during a graduation ceremony.

=== Research career pathway ===
Academic staff whose main focus is research:

- Professorial research fellow / director of research
- Principal research fellow / principal research associate
- Senior research fellow
- Research fellow
- Research associate
- Research assistant
- Research support

=== Teaching career pathway ===
Academic staff whose main focus is essential teaching, educational needs, and for senior grades, often pedagogic research:

- Professorial teaching fellow / professor
- Principal teaching fellow / principal lecturer
- Senior teaching fellow / senior university teacher / senior lecturer
- Teaching fellow / university teacher / lecturer
- Teaching associate

Note that some universities (for example, the University of Glasgow) give the same titles as Research & Teaching track academics to give parity to the roles.

=== Emeritus ranks ===
- Emeritus professor
- Emeritus reader
- Senior fellow
- Fellow

=== Honorary/visiting ranks ===
Common titles for honorary, visiting and honorary visiting academics:

- Honorary/visiting professor or honorary/visiting professorial fellow
- Honorary/visiting reader or honorary/visiting associate professor or honorary/visiting principal lecturer
- Honorary/visiting senior lecturer or honorary/visiting senior fellow
- Honorary/visiting lecturer or honorary/visiting fellow

=== Administrative ranks: England, Wales, and Northern Ireland ===
- Chancellor (titular)
- Pro-chancellor (titular)
- Vice-chancellor (sometimes provost; increasingly 'vice-chancellor and chief executive officer' )
- Deputy vice-chancellor
- Pro-vice-chancellor
- Deans of faculties
- Heads of departments/schools
- Department/school directors of studies

=== Administrative ranks: Scotland ===
- Chancellor (titular)
- Rector (ancient universities only)
- Principal (who is also vice-chancellor)
- Deputy principal
- Vice-principals
- Deans of faculties
- Heads of departments/schools
- Department/school directors of studies, or personal tutors

== Comparison ==
Commonwealth system	United States system	German system	French system
Professor (chair)	Professor, distinguished professor, chaired professor, or equivalent	Professor (ordinarius, W3 with chair, C4)	Professeur des universités, directeur d'études
Reader, principal lecturer, associate professor	Professor	Professor (extraordinarius, W2, W3 without chair, C3)	Professeur des universités, directeur d'études
Senior lecturer	Associate professor	Hochschuldozent, Oberassistent (W2, C2), Privatdozent	Maître de conférences
Lecturer	Assistant professor	Privatdozent, Juniorprofessor, Wissenschaftlicher Assistent, Akademischer Rat (W1, C1, A13)	Maître de conférences
Assistant lecturer, demonstrator, seminar leader	Research associate, lecturer, researcher, instructor	Privatdozent, Wissenschaftlicher Mitarbeiter ohne eigenständige Lehrbefugnis	Attaché temporaire d'enseignement et de recherche (ATER)
Associate lecturer	Adjunct lecturer, instructor	Privatdozent, Honorarprofessor	Chargé de cours

== See also ==
- Lecturer § Tenure
- Fellow
