= Philosophy of linguistics =

Philosophy of science applied to linguistics

The philosophy of linguistics is the philosophy of science applied to linguistics. It is concerned with topics including what the subject matter and theoretical goals of linguistics are, what forms linguistic theories should take, and what counts as data in linguistic research. This distinguishes the philosophy of linguistics from the philosophy of language, which deals primarily with the philosophical study of meaning and reference.
